= List of West Virginia Tech Golden Bears head football coaches =

The West Virginia Tech Golden Bears football program was a college football team that represented West Virginia University Institute of Technology in the Mid-South Conference, a part of the National Association of Intercollegiate Athletics. The team had 25 head coaches since its first recorded football game in 1907. The final coach was Scott Tinsley who first took the position for the 2008 season. The Golden Bears' program was discontinued following the 2011 season.

== Key ==
Key to symbols in coaches list
General		Overall		Conference		Postseason (Note: Although the first Rose Bowl Game was played in 1902, it has been continuously played since the 1916 game, and is recognized as the oldest bowl game by the NCAA. "—" indicates any season prior to 1916 when postseason games were not played.)	
No.	Order of coaches (Note: A running total of the number of head coaches, with coaches who served separate tenures being counted only once. Interim head coaches are represented with "Int" and are not counted in the running total. "—" indicates the team played but either without a coach or no coach is on record. "X" indicates an interim year without play.)	GC	Games coached	CW	Conference wins	PW	Postseason wins
DC	Division championships	OW	Overall wins	CL	Conference losses	PL	Postseason losses
CC	Conference championships	OL	Overall losses	CT	Conference ties	PT	Postseason ties
NC	National championships	OT	Overall ties (Note: Overtime rules in college football were introduced in 1996, making ties impossible in the period since.)	C%	Conference winning percentage		
†	Elected to the College Football Hall of Fame	O%	Overall winning percentage (Note: When computing the win–loss percentage, a tie counts as half a win and half a loss.)				

== Coaches ==
No.	Name	Term	GC	OW	OL	OT	O%	CW	CL	CT	C%	PW	PL	CCs	Awards
0	Unknown	1907–1912	2	0	2	0	.000	—	—	—	—	—	—	—	—
1	Robert Fudge	1920	6	1	4	1	.250	—	—	—	—	—	—	—	—
2	Red Weaver	1921	8	4	3	1	.563	—	—	—	—	—	—	—	—
3	R. C. Garrison	1922	8	5	1	2	.750	—	—	—	—	—	—	—	—
4	Homer C. Martin	1923–1926	29	15	9	5	.603	—	—	—	—	—	—	—	—
5	C. R. MacGillivray	1927	6	0	6	0	.000	—	—	—	—	—	—	—	—
6	Ken Shroyer	1928–1933	44	28	11	5	.693	—	—	—	—	—	—	—	—
7	Marshall L. Shearer	1934	5	0	5	0	.000	—	—	—	—	—	—	—	—
8	Steve Harrick	1935–1946	74	34	39	1	.466	—	—	—	—	—	—	—	—
9	Charles Hockenberry	1947–1948	18	10	8	0	.556	—	—	—	—	—	—	—	—
10	Herb Royer	1949–1950	19	14	3	2	.789	—	—	—	—	—	—	—	—
11	Don L. Phillips	1951–1956	52	28	23	1	.548	—	—	—	—	—	—	—	—
12	Ray H. Watson	1957–1959	26	16	8	2	.654	—	—	—	—	—	—	—	—
13	Charley Cobb	1960–1975	136	44	83	9	.357	—	—	—	—	—	—	—	—
14	Roy Lucas	1976–1982	65	26	35	4	.431	—	—	—	—	—	—	—	—
15	Jim Heal	1983–1988	60	26	32	2	.450	—	—	—	—	—	—	—	—
16	Bob Gobel	1989–1995	51	8	42	1	.167	—	—	—	—	—	—	—	—
17	Jim Marsh	1990	10	3	7	0	.300	—	—	—	—	—	—	—	—
18	Kevin Bradley	1991	10	0	10	0	.000	—	—	—	—	—	—	—	—
19	Paul Price	1996–1998	33	1	32	0	.030	—	—	—	—	—	—	—	—
20	Mike Springston	1999–2002	41	16	25	0	.390	—	—	—	—	—	—	—	—
21	Mauro Monz	2003–2004	22	5	17	0	.227	—	—	—	—	—	—	—	—
22	Bill Briggs	2005	11	0	11	0	.000	—	—	—	—	—	—	—	—
23	Shane Beatty	2006–2007	22	2	20	0	.091	—	—	—	—	—	—	—	—
24	Scott Tinsley	2008–2011	43	6	37	0	.140	—	—	—	—	—	—	—	—
