= Dempsey (disambiguation) =

Dempsey is both a surname and a given name.

Dempsey may also refer to:

== Animals ==
- Dempsey (dog) (1986–2003), an American pit bull terrier involved in British muzzling laws
- Jack Dempsey (fish), a North and Central American fish

== Culture ==
- Dempsey and Makepeace, a British television crime drama (1984–1986)
- Dempsey (film), a 1983 TV movie based on the life of the boxer Jack Dempsey

== Places ==
- Dempsey, Idaho
- Dempsey, West Virginia
- Dempsey Road, a road in Tanglin, Singapore
- Dempsey Store, a defunct hardware store that is a historic site in Toronto, Canada
- Dempsey Wood House, a historic building in North Carolina, United States

== Ships ==
- USS Dempsey, the name of more than one United States Navy ship

== Others ==
- Dempsey, the code name for a version of Intel's Dual-Core Xeon CPU
