= 1946 Pennsylvania State Teachers College Conference football season =

- Sport: Football
- Teams: 11
- Champion: California (PA)

Football seasons
- 1945 1947

1946 Pennsylvania State Teachers College Conference football standings
	Conf.					Overall
Team	W		L		T	W		L		T
California (PA) $	4	–	0	–	0	9	–	0	–	0
Mansfield	5	–	0	–	1	7	–	0	–	1
West Chester	2	–	1	–	0	9	–	1	–	0
Slippery Rock	2	–	1	–	0	3	–	4	–	1
Indiana (PA)	3	–	3	–	0	5	–	3	–	0
Bloomsburg	3	–	3	–	1	4	–	3	–	1
Millersville	3	–	3	–	0	3	–	3	–	0
Clarion	2	–	2	–	0	3	–	4	–	0
Lock Haven	3	–	4	–	1	4	–	5	–	1
East Stroudsburg	1	–	2	–	0	5	–	2	–	0
Shippensburg	2	–	5	–	1	2	–	5	–	1
Kutztown	1	–	4	–	0	3	–	4	–	0
Edinboro	0	–	3	–	0	0	–	6	–	0
$ – Conference champion

The 1946 Pennsylvania State Teachers College Conference football season was the season of college football played by the 11 member schools of the Pennsylvania State Teachers College Conference (PSTCC) as part of the 1946 college football season.

The California Vulcans won the PSTCC championship with a perfect 9–0 record and outscored opponents by a total of 284 to 34.

== Conference overview ==
Conf. rank	Team	Head coach	Conf. record	Overall record	Points scored	Points against
1	California (PA)	Earl Bruce	4–0	9–0	284	34
2	Mansfield	Ted Casey	5–0–1	7–0–1	155	52
3 (tie)	West Chester	Glenn Killinger	2–1	9–1	187	33
3 (tie)	Slippery Rock	William Storer	2–1	3–4–1	57	41
5	Indiana (PA)	George P. Miller	3–3	5–3	150	85
6 (tie)	Bloomsburg	John A. Hoch	3–3–1	4–3–1	91	57
6 (tie)	Millersville	John Fischer	3–3	3–3	60	57
6 (tie)	Clarion	Waldo S. Tippin	2–2	3–4	123	86
9	Lock Haven	Hubert Jack	3–4–1	4–5–1	132	165
10	East Stroudsburg	Eugene Martin	1–1	5–2	176	33
11	Shippensburg	Eddie Gulian	2–5–1	2–5–1	73	155
12	Kutztown	Walt Risley	1–4	3–4	14	103
13	Edinboro	Art McComb	0–3	0–6	7	161

== Teams ==
=== California ===
1946 California Vulcans football

PSTCC champion
- Conference: Pennsylvania State Teachers College Conference
- Record: 9–0 (4–0 PSTCC)
- Head coach: Earl Bruce (1st season)
- Home stadium: Charleroi Stadium; Brownsville High School stadium California High School field

The 1946 California Vulcans football team represented California State Teachers College (now known as California University of Pennsylvania) of California, Pennsylvania. In their first year under head coach Earl Bruce, the team compiled a perfect 9–0 record, won the PSTCC championship, and outscored opponents by a total of 284 to 34. It was California's first season of football after a four-year hiatus due to World War II.

California had the highest scoring college football team in Pennsylvania.

Date	Time	Opponent	Site	Result	Attendance	Source
September 28		Shippensburg	Brownsville High School stadium; Brownsville, PA	W 32–7	3,000	
October 4		vs. West Liberty State*	Wheeling, WV	W 21–0	3,000	
October 12		Indiana (PA)	California High School field; California, PA	W 18–6		
October 19	8:15 p.m.	West Virginia Tech*	Charleroi Stadium; Charleroi, PA	W 38–2	5,000	
October 26		at Clarion	Clarion, PA	W 19–7		
October 31		Salem (WV)*	Charleroi Stadium; Charleroi, PA	W 54–0	3,000	
November 9	2:00 p.m.	at Potomac State*	Stayman Field; Keyser, WV	W 21–6	2,500	
November 16		at Fairmont State*	Fairmont, WV	W 20–0		
November 21		Lock Haven	Charleroi Stadium; Charleroi, PA	W 61–6	> 6,000	
*Non-conference game; All times are in Eastern time

=== Mansfield ===
1946 Mansfield Mountaineers football
- Conference: Pennsylvania State Teachers College Conference
- Record: 7–0–1 (5–0–1 PSTCC)
- Head coach: Ted Casey (1st season)

The 1946 Mansfield Mountaineers football team represented Mansfield State Teachers College (now known as Mansfield University of Pennsylvania) of Mansfield, Pennsylvania. Led by first-year head coach Ted Casey, the Mountaineers compiled a 7–0–1 record (5–0–1 against PSTCC opponents), finished in second place in the PSTCC, and outscored opponents by a total of 155 to 52.

Date	Opponent	Site	Result	Attendance	Source
September 30	at Bloomsburg	Bloomsburg High School Athletic Park; Bloomsburg, PA	T 0–0	2,000	
October 5	Millersville	Mansfield, PA	W 14–7		
October 12	Cortland State*	Mansfield, PA	W 9–6	2,000	
October 19	at Kutztown	Kutztown, PA	W 14–0		
October 26	Dickinson Seminary*	Mansfield, PA	W 28–6		
November 2	at Edinboro	Edinboro, PA	W 51–7		
November 9	Indiana (PA)	Mansfield, PA	W 25–13		
November 16	at Lock Haven	Lock Haven, PA	W 14–13		
*Non-conference game

=== Slippery Rock ===
1946 Slippery Rock Rockets football
- Conference: Pennsylvania State Teachers College Conference
- Record: 3–4–1 (2–1 PSTCC)
- Head coach: William Storer (1st season)

The 1946 Slippery Rock Rockets football team represented Slippery Rock State Teachers College (now known as Slippery Rock University of Pennsylvania) of Slippery Rock, Pennsylvania. The team compiled a 3–4–1 record (2–1 against PSTCC opponents), finished in fourth place in the PSTCC, and outscored opponents by a total of 57 to 41. Kerr Thompson began the season as head coach, announced his retirement during the season, and was replaced by William Storer.

Date	Opponent	Site	Result	Attendance	Source
September 28	Westminster (PA)*	Slippery Rock, PA	T 0–0	2,500	
October 5	Indiana	Slippery Rock, PA	W 7–6	2,000	
October 12	Thiel*	Slippery Rock, PA	L 0–2		
October 19	at Shippensburg	Heiges Field; Shippensburg, PA	L 7–13	2,500	
October 25	at Fairmont State*	Fairont, WV	L 0–7		
November 2	at Grove City*	Grove City, PA	W 15–0		
November 9	at Geneva*	Reeves Field; Beaver Falls, PA	L 3–13		
November 16	Edinboro	Slippery Rock, PA	W 19–0		
*Non-conference game

=== Indiana ===
1946 Indiana Indians football
- Conference: Pennsylvania State Teachers College Conference
- Record: 5–3 (3–3 PSTCC)
- Head coach: George P. Miller (18th season)

The 1946 Indiana Indians football team represented Indiana State Teachers College (now known as Indiana University of Pennsylvania) of Indiana, Pennsylvania. Led by 18th-year head coach George P. Miller, Indiana State compiled a 5–3 record (3–3 against PSTCC opponents), finished in fifth place in the PSTCC, and outscored opponents by a total of 150 to 85.

Date	Opponent	Site	Result	Attendance	Source
September 28	Saint Vincent*	Indiana, PA	W 20–7		
October 5	at Slippery Rock	Slippery Rock, PA	L 6–7		
October 12	at California (PA)	California High School field; California, PA	L 6–18		
October 19	Fairmont State*^{†}	Indiana, PA	W 33–7	5,000	
October 26	at Lock Haven	Lock Haven High School Stadium; Lock Haven, PA	W 13–0		
November 2	Clarion	Indiana, PA	W 27–14		
November 9	at Mansfield	Mansfield, PA	L 13–25		
November 16	Shippensburg	Indiana, PA	W 32–7		
*Non-conference game; ^{†}Homecoming

=== Bloomsburg ===
1946 Bloomsburg Huskies football
- Conference: Pennsylvania State Teachers College Conference
- Record: 4–3–1 (3–3–1 PSTCC)
- Head coach: John A. Hoch (1st season)
- Home stadium: Bloomsburg High School Athletic Park

The 1946 Bloomsburg Huskies football team represented Bloomsburg State Teachers College (now known as Bloomsburg University of Pennsylvania) of Bloomsburg, Pennsylvania. Led by first-year head coach John A. Hoch, the Huskies compiled a 4–3–1 record (3–3–1 against PSTCC opponents), finished in eighth place in the PSTCC, and outscored opponents by a total of 91 to 57.

Date	Opponent	Site	Result	Attendance	Source
September 30	Mansfield	Bloomsburg High School Athletic Park; Bloomsburg, PA	T 0–0	2,000	
	Lock Haven		L 12–20		
	Clarion		L 0–6		
	Millersville		L 0–13		
	Shippensburg		W 12–6		
	Kutztown		W 19–0		
	East Stroudsburg		W 7–6		
	Rider*		W 41–6		
*Non-conference game

=== Millersville ===
1946 Millersville Marauders football
- Conference: Pennsylvania State Teachers College Conference
- Record: 3–3 (3–3 PSTCC)
- Head coach: John Fischer (1st season)

The 1946 Millersville Marauders football team represented Millersville State Teachers College (now known as Millersville University of Pennsylvania) of Millersville, Pennsylvania. Led by first-year head coach John Fischer, the Marauders compiled a 3–3 record (3–3 against PSTCC opponents), finished in third place in the PSTCC, and outscored opponents by a total of 60 to 57.

Date	Opponent	Site	Result	Attendance	Source
October 5	at Mansfield	Mansfield, PA	L 7–14		
October 12	Lock Haven		W 13–12		
October 19	Bloomsburg	Glatfelter Field; Columbia, PA	W 13–0	3,500	
November 2	Shippensburg	Glatfelter Field; Columbia, PA	W 27–13		
November 9	Kutztown	College Field	L 0–6		
November 16	West Chester	Williamson Field; Millersville, PA	L 0–12		

=== Clarion ===
1946 Clarion Golden Eagles football
- Conference: Pennsylvania State Teachers College Conference
- Record: 3–4 (2–2 PSTCC)
- Head coach: Waldo S. Tippin (12th season)

The 1946 Clarion Golden Eagles football team represented Clarion State Teachers College (now known as Clarion University of Pennsylvania) of Clarion, Pennsylvania. In their 12th year under head coach Waldo S. Tippin, the Golden Eagles compiled a 3–4 record (2–2 against PSTCC opponents), finished in sixth place in the PSTCC, and outscored opponents by a total of 123 to 86.

Date	Opponent	Site	Result	Attendance	Source
October 5	Edinboro	Clarion, PA	W 50–0		
October 11	at Bloomsburg	Bloomsburg, PA	W 6–0		
October 19	at Thiel*	Packard Field; Greenville, PA	L 13–14		
October 26	California (PA)	Clarion, PA	L 7-19		
November 2	at Indiana (PA)	Indiana, PA	L 14–27		
November 9	at Bethany (WV)*	Bethany, WV	L 7–19		
November 16	Alliance*	Clarion, PA	W 26–7		
*Non-conference game

=== Lock Haven ===
1946 Lock Haven Bald Eagles football
- Conference: Pennsylvania State Teachers College Conference
- Record: 4–5–1 (3–4–1 PSTCC)
- Head coach: Hubert Jack (1st season)

The 1946 Lock Haven Bald Eagles football team represented Lock Haven State Teachers College (now known as Lock Haven University of Pennsylvania) of Lock Haven, Pennsylvania. Led by first-year head coach Hubert Jack, the Bald Eagles compiled a 4–5–1 record (1–4–1 against PSTCC opponents), finished in ninth place in the PSTCC, and were outscored by a total of 165 to 132.

Date	Opponent	Site	Result	Attendance	Source
	Scranton*		L 6–26		
	Kutztown		W 24–13		
	Bloomsburg		W 20–12		
	Millersville		L 12–13		
October 18	at West Chester	Wayne Field; West Chester, PA	W 13–6	5,000	
	Indiana (PA)		L 0–13		
	Rider*		W 31–0		
	Shippensburg		T 7–7		
November 16	Mansfield	Lock Haven, PA	L 13–14		
	California (PA)		L 6–61		
*Non-conference game

=== East Stroudsburg ===
1946 East Stroudsburg Warriors football
- Conference: Pennsylvania State Teachers College Conference
- Record: 5–2 (1–1 PSTCC)
- Head coach: Eugene Martin (2nd season)

The 1946 East Stroudsburg Warriors football team represented East Stroudsburg State Teachers College (now known as East Stroudsburg University of Pennsylvania) of East Stroudsburg, Pennsylvania. Led by second-year head coach Eugene Martin, the Warriors compiled a 5–2 record (1–1 against PSTCC opponents), finished in seventh place in the PSTCC, and outscored opponents by a total of 176 to 33.

Date	Opponent	Site	Result	Attendance	Source
	Panzer		W 26–0		
	Shippensburg		W 32–7		
	Cortland State		W 25–6		
October 25	West Chester	Wayne Field; West Chester, PA	L 7–13		
	Montclair Teachers		W 53–0		
	Bloomsburg		L 6–7		
November 16	CCNY	Lewisohn Stadium; New York, NY	W 27–0		

=== Shippensburg ===
1946 Shippensburg Red Raiders football
- Conference: Pennsylvania State Teachers College Conference
- Record: 2–5–1 (1–5–1 PSTCC)
- Head coach: Eddie Gulian (11th season)

The 1946 Shippensburg Red Raiders football team represented Shippensburg State Teachers College (now known as Shippensburg University of Pennsylvania) of Shippensburg, Pennsylvania. In their eleventh season under head coach Eddie Gulian, the Raiders compiled a 2–5–1 record (1–5–1 against PSTCC opponents), finished in tenth place in the PSTCC, and were outscored by a total of 155 to 73.

Date	Opponent	Site	Result	Attendance	Source
September 28	at California (PA)		L 7–32		
October 5	Kutztown*	Shippensburg, PA	W 13–6		
October 12	at East Stroudsburg		L 7–32		
October 19	Slippery Rock	Shippensburg, PA	W 13–7		
October 26	Bloomsburg	Shippensburg, PA	L 6–12		
November 2	at Millersville		L 13–27		
November 9	Lock Haven	Shippensburg, PA	T 7–7		
November 16	at Indiana (PA)		L 7–32		
*Non-conference game

=== Edinboro ===
1946 Edinboro Fighting Scots football
- Conference: Pennsylvania State Teachers College Conference
- Record: 0–6 (0–3 PSTCC)
- Head coach: Art McComb (1st season)

The 1946 Edinboro Fighting Scots football team represented Edinboro State Teachers College (now known as Edinboro University of Pennsylvania) of Edinboro, Pennsylvania. Led by first-year head coach Art McComb, the Fighting Scots compiled a 0–6 record (0–3 against PSTCC opponents), finished in last place in the PSTCC, scored only once in the entire season, and were outscored by a total of 161 to 7.

Date	Opponent	Site	Result	Attendance	Source
	Clarion		L 0–50		
	Westminster (PA)*		L 0–7		
	Alliance*		L 0–21		
	Thiel*		L 0–7		
November 2	Mansfield	Edinboro, PA	L 7–51		
	Slippery Rock		L 0–25		
*Non-conference game
