= 1946 West Virginia Intercollegiate Athletic Conference football season =

West Virginia Intercollegiate Athletic Conference
- Sport: Football
- Teams: 13
- Champion: West Liberty State

Football seasons
- 1945 1947

1946 West Virginia Intercollegiate Athletic Conference football standings
	Conf.					Overall
Team	W		L		T	W		L		T
West Liberty State $	4	–	0	–	0	7	–	2	–	0
Potomac State	7	–	1	–	0	7	–	2	–	0
West Virginia Tech	5	–	1	–	0	6	–	2	–	0
Fairmont State	3	–	1	–	1	4	–	3	–	1
West Virginia Wesleyan	4	–	3	–	0	6	–	3	–	0
Davis & Elkins	2	–	3	–	1	3	–	5	–	2
Morris Harvey	2	–	3	–	0	2	–	5	–	0
Concord	1	–	3	–	2	1	–	5	–	2
Glenville State	1	–	5	–	2	1	–	5	–	2
Shepherd	1	–	5	–	0	1	–	5	–	0
Salem	0	–	5	–	0	0	–	8	–	0
Marshall *	2	–	0	–	0	2	–	7	–	1
Bethany (WV) *	0	–	2	–	0	1	–	7	–	0
$ – Conference champion; * – Did not qualify for conference standings Ties did not count in conference standings.

The 1946 West Virginia Intercollegiate Athletic Conference football season was the season of college football played by the 13 member schools of the West Virginia Intercollegiate Athletic Conference (WVIAC) as part of the 1946 college football season.

The West Liberty State Hilltoppers won the WVIAC championship with a 7–2 record (4–0 against conference opponents) and outscored all opponents by a total of 183 to 70.

== Conference overview ==
Conf. rank	Team	Head coach	Conf. record	Overall record	Points scored	Points against
1	West Liberty State	Joe Bartell	4–0	7–2	183	70
2	Potomac State	D. G. Lough	7–1	7–2	105	49
3	West Virginia Tech	Steve Harrick	5–1	6–2	96	66
4	Fairmont State	Squibb Wilson	3–1–1	4–3–1	55	70
5	West Virginia Wesleyan	Cecil B. Ross	4–3	6–3	134	97
6	Davis & Elkins	Harvey E. Rooker	2–3–1	3–5–2	59	121
7	Morris Harvey	Alderson Propps (first 2 games); Eddie King (final 5 games)	2–3	2–5	38	117
8	Concord	James Callaghan	1–3–2	1–5–2	34	126
9	Glenville State	Carlos Ratliff	1–5–2	1–5–2	32	63
10	Shepherd	Cleftus Lowe	1–5	1–5	21	102
11	Salem	Sam Gwosden	0–5	0–8	18	192
*	Marshall	Cam Henderson	2–0	2–7–1	190	145
*	Bethany (WV)	Don L. Phillips	0–2	1–7	45	124

Marshall and Bethany did not play enough conference game to qualify for conference standing. Ties did not count in conference standings.

== Teams ==
=== West Liberty State ===
1946 West Liberty State Hilltoppers football

WVIAC champion
- Conference: West Virginia Intercollegiate Athletic Conference
- Record: 7–2 (4–0 WVIAC)
- Head coach: Joe Bartell (11th season)

The 1946 West Liberty State Hilltoppers football team represented West Liberty State College (later renamed West Liberty University of West Liberty, West Virginia. In their 11th year under head coach Joe Bartell, the Hilltoppers compiled a 7–2 record (4–0 against WVIAC teams), won the WVIAC championship, and outscored opponents by a total of 183 to 70.

Date	Opponent	Site	Result	Attendance	Source
September 21	Detroit Tech*	Wellsburg, WV	W 22–7		
October 4	vs. California (PA)*	Wheeling, WV	L 0–21	3,000	
October 12	at Morehead State*	Morehead, KY	L 0–26		
October 19	at Waynesburg*	Waynesburg, PA	W 28–3		
October 25	vs. Davis & Elkins	Dreshar Stadium; Tarentum, PA	W 31–0	3,500	
November 1	at Saint Vincent	Latrobe, PA	W 13–6		
November 8	Concord	West Liberty, WV	W 48–7		
November 16	at Potomac State	Stayman Field; Keyser, WV	W 7–0	1,500	
November 22	Salem^{†}	West Liberty, WV	W 34–0		
*Non-conference game; ^{†}Homecoming

=== Marshall ===
1946 Marshall Thundering Herd football
- Conference: West Virginia Intercollegiate Athletic Conference
- Record: 2–7–1 (2–0 WVIAC)
- Head coach: Cam Henderson (9th season)
- Captains: Jack Chapman; Don Gibson
- Home stadium: Fairfield Stadium

The 1946 Marshall Thundering Herd football team was an American football team that represented Marshall University of Huntington, West Virginia. In its ninth season under head coach Cam Henderson, the team compiled a 2–7–1 record and was outscored by a total of 190 to 145.

=== Potomac State ===
1946 Potomac State Catamounts football
- Conference: West Virginia Intercollegiate Athletic Conference
- Record: 7–2 (7–1 WVIAC)
- Head coach: D.G. Lough
- Home stadium: Stayman Field

The 1946 Potomac State Catamounts football team was an American football team that represented Potomac State College of Keyser, West Virginia. Led by head coach D.G. Lough, the Catamounts compiled a 7–2 record (7–1 against WVIAC teams), finished in third place in the WVIAC, and outscored opponents by a total of 105 to 49.

Date	Time	Opponent	Site	Result	Attendance	Source
September 20		vs. West Virginia Tech		W 7–0		
		Concord		W 13–6		
		Morris Harvey		W 7–0		
		Shepherd		W 21–0		
		Davis & Elkins		W 7–0		
		Salem		W 20–0		
		Glenville State		W 24–6		
November 9	2:00 p.m.	California State (PA)*	Stayman Field; Keyser, WV	L 6–21	2,500	
		West Liberty State		L 0–7		
*Non-conference game; All times are in Eastern time

=== West Virginia Tech ===
1946 West Virginia Tech Golden Bears football
- Conference: West Virginia Intercollegiate Athletic Conference
- Record: 6–2 (5–1 WVIAC)
- Head coach: Steve Harrick

The 1946 West Virginia Tech Golden Bears football team was an American football team that represented the West Virginia University Institute of Technology of Beckley, West Virginia. Led by head coach Steve Harrick, the team compiled a 6–2 record (5–1 against WVIAC teams), finished in fourth place in the WVIAC, and outscored opponents by a total of 96 to 66.

Date	Time	Opponent	Site	Result	Attendance	Source
September 20		vs. Potomac State		L 0–7		
		Marietta*		W 21–0		
		Fairmont State		W 10–0		
		Glenville State		W 7–0		
October 19	8:15 p.m.	at California (PA)*	Charleroi Stadium; Charleroi, PA	L 2–38	5,000	
		West Virginia Wesleyan		W 23–15		
		Concord		W 26–0		
		Morris Harvey		W 7–6		
*Non-conference game; All times are in Eastern time

=== Fairmont State ===
1946 Fairmont State Fighting Falcons football
- Conference: West Virginia Intercollegiate Athletic Conference
- Record: 4–3–1 (3–1–1 WVIAC)
- Head coach: Squibb Wilson (4th season)

The 1946 Fairmont State Fighting Falcons football team was an American football team that represented Fairmont State University of Fairmont, West Virginia. Led by head coach Squibb Wilson, the Fighting Falcons compiled a 4–3–1 record (3–1–1 against WVIAC teams), finished in fifth place in the WVIAC, and were outscored by a total of 70 to 55.

Date	Opponent	Site	Result	Attendance	Source
	Glenville State		W 7–0		
	West Virginia Tech		L 0–10		
	Bethany (WV)		W 13–0		
October 19	at Indiana State (PA)*	Indiana, PA	L 7–33	5,000	
October 25	Slippery Rock State*	Fairmont, WV	W 7–0		
	Concord		T 0–0		
	Shepherd		W 21–7		
November 16	California (PA)*	Fairmont, WV	L 0–20		
*Non-conference game

=== West Virginia Wesleyan ===
1946 West Virginia Wesleyan Bobcats football
- Conference: West Virginia Intercollegiate Athletic Conference
- Record: 6–3 (4–3 WVIAC)
- Head coach: Cecil B. Ross (18th season)

The 1946 West Virginia Wesleyan Bobcats football team was an American football team that represented West Virginia Wesleyan College of Buckhannon, West Virginia. Led by head coach Cecil B. Ross, the Bobcats compiled a 6–3 record (4–3 against WVIAC teams), finished in sixth place in the WVIAC, and outscored opponents by a total of 134 to 97.

Date	Opponent	Site	Result	Attendance	Source
September 28	at Marshall	Fairfield Stadium; Huntington, WV	L 12–29		
	Glenville State		W 19–6		
	Salem		W 6–0		
October 18	Morris Harvey	Buckhannon, WV	L 2–6		
	Waynesburg		W 13–6		
	West Virginia Tech		L 15–23		
	Marietta*		W 33–20		
	Bethany (WV)		W 14–7		
	Davis & Elkins		W 20–0		
*Non-conference game

=== Davis & Elkins ===
1946 Davis & Elkins Senators football
- Conference: West Virginia Intercollegiate Athletic Conference
- Record: 3–5–2 (2–3–1 WVIAC)
- Head coach: Harvey E. Rooker

The 1946 Davis & Elkins Senators football team was an American football team that represented Davis & Elkins College of Elkins, West Virginia. Led by head coach Harvey E. Rooker, the Senators compiled a 3–5–2 record (2–3–1 against WVIAC teams), finished in seventh place in the WVIAC, and were outscored by a total of 121 to 59.

Date	Opponent	Site	Result	Attendance	Source
September 21	at Quantico Marines	Quantico, VA	W 14–6		
	Shepherd		W 19–0		
	Salem		W 19–12		
	Moravian		T 0–0		
	Potomac State		L 0–7		
	West Liberty State		L 0–31		
	Alliance		L 7–13		
	Glenville State		T 0–0		
	St. Vincent		L 0–32		
	West Virginia Wesleyan		L 0–20		

=== Morris Harvey ===
1946 Morris Harvey Golden Eagles football
- Conference: West Virginia Intercollegiate Athletic Conference
- Record: 2–5 (2–3 WVIAC)
- Head coach: Alderson Propps (1st season; first 2 games); Eddie King (1st season, final 5 games)
- Home stadium: Laidley Field

The 1946 Morris Harvey Golden Eagles football team was an American football team that represented Morris Harvey College (now part of University of Charleston) of Charleston, West Virginia. Alderson Propps began the season as head football coach and athletic director at Morris Harvey, but resigned after the team lost its first two games. He was succeeded by assistant coach Eddie King. The Eagles compiled an overall record 2–5 record with mark of 2–3 in conference play, finishing in eighth place in the WVIAC. They were outscored by a total of 117 to 38.

Date	Time	Opponent	Site	Result	Attendance	Source
September 28		Morehead State*	Laidley Field; Charleston, WV	L 6–39		
October 5		Potomac State	Laidley Field; Charleston, WV	L 0–7	3,500	
October 18		at West Virginia Wesleyan	Buckhannon, WV	W 6–2		
November 2		Marshall	Laidley Field; Charleston, WV	L 0–34		
November 9	2:30 p.m.	at Youngstown*	Rayen Stadium; Youngstown, OH	L 14–28	4,500	
November 16		at West Virginia Tech	Montgomery, WV	L 6–7		
November 23		Glenville State	Laidley Field; Charleston, WV	W 6–0		
*Non-conference game; All times are in Eastern time

=== Concord ===
1946 Concord Mountain Lions football
- Conference: West Virginia Intercollegiate Athletic Conference
- Record: 1–5–2 (1–3–2 WVIAC)
- Head coach: James Callaghan

The 1946 Concord Mountain Lions football team was an American football team that represented Concord State University of Athens, West Virginia. Led by head coach James Callaghan, the team compiled a 1–5–2 record (1–3–2 against WVIAC teams), finished in ninth place in the WVIAC, and were outscored by a total of 126 to 34.

Date	Opponent	Site	Result	Attendance	Source
	Potomac State		L 6–13		
	Shepherd		W 21–7		
	VPI "B"" team		L 0–6		
	Glenville State		T 0–0		
	West Virginia Tech		L 0–26		
	Fairmont State		T 0–0		
	West Liberty State		L 7–48		
	Emory & Henry		L 0–26		

=== Glenville State ===
1946 Glenville State Pioneers football
- Conference: West Virginia Intercollegiate Athletic Conference
- Record: 1–5–2 (1–5–2 WVIAC)
- Head coach: Carlos Ratliff (1st season)

The 1946 Glenville State Pioneers football team was an American football team that represented Glenville State University of Glenville, West Virginia. In their first year under head coach Carlos Ratliff, the team compiled a 1–5–2 record (1–5–2 against WVIAC teams), finished in tenth place in the WVIAC, and were outscored by a total of 63 to 32.

Date	Opponent	Site	Result	Attendance	Source
	Fairmont State		L 0–7		
	West Virginia Wesleyan		L 6–19		
	West Virginia Tech		L 0–7		
	Concord		T 0–0		
	Shepherd		W 20–0		
	Potomac State		L 6–24		
	Davis & Elkins		T 0–0		
	Morris Havey		L 0–6		

=== Shepherd ===
1946 Shepherd Rams football
- Conference: West Virginia Intercollegiate Athletic Conference
- Record: 1–5 (1–5 WVIAC)
- Head coach: Cleftus Lowe (1st season)

The 1946 Shepherd Rams football team was an American football team that represented Shepherd State University of Shepherdstown, West Virginia. Led by first-year head coach Cleftus Lowe, the team compiled a 1–5 record (1–5 against WVIAC teams), finished in eleventh place in the WVIAC, and were outscored by a total of 102 to 21.

Date	Opponent	Site	Result	Attendance	Source
	Davis & Elkins		L 0–19		
	Concord		L 7–21		
	Potomac State		L 0–21		
	Salem		W 7–0		
	Fairmont State		L 7–21		
	Glenville State		L 0–20		

=== Bethany ===
1946 Bethany Bison football
- Conference: West Virginia Intercollegiate Athletic Conference
- Record: 1–7 (0–2 WVIAC)
- Head coach: Don L. Phillips (1st season)

The 1946 Bethany Bison football team was an American football team that represented Bethany College of Bethany, West Virginia. In their first year under head coach Don L. Phillips, the team compiled a 1–7 record (0–2 against WVIAC teams), finished in twelfth place in the WVIAC, and were outscored by a total of 124 to 45.

Date	Opponent	Site	Result	Attendance	Source
September 28	at Washington & Jefferson*	College Field; Washington, PA	L 0–6		
	Mount Union*		L 6–20		
	Fairmont State		L 0–13		
	Geneva		L 0–19		
	Westminster		L 7–13		
November 2	Buffalo*	Bethany, WV	L 6–32		
November 9	Clarion State*	Bethany, WV	W 19–7		
	West Virginia Wesleyan		L 7–14		
*Non-conference game

=== Salem ===
1946 Salem Tigers football
- Conference: West Virginia Intercollegiate Athletic Conference
- Record: 0–8 (0–5 WVIAC)
- Head coach: Sam Gwosden

The 1946 Salem Tigers football team was an American football team that represented Salem University of Salem, West Virginia. Led by head coach Sam Gwosden, the team compiled a 0–8 record (0–5 against WVIAC teams), finished in 13th place in the WVIAC, and were outscored by a total of 192 to 18.

Date	Opponent	Site	Result	Attendance	Source
	Alliance		L 0–7		
	Davis & Elkins		L 12–19		
	West Virginia Wesleyan		L 0–6		
	Potomac State		L 0–20		
	Shepherd		L 0–7		
October 31	at California State (PA)*	Charleroi Stadium; Charleroi, PA	L 0–54	3,000	
	St. Vincent's		L 6–45		
	West Liberty State		L 0-34		
*Non-conference game
