= 1934 West Virginia Wesleyan Bobcats football team =

American college football season

1934 West Virginia Wesleyan Bobcats football
- Conference: West Virginia Athletic Conference
- Record: 6–3–1 (4–0 WVAC)
- Head coach: Cebe Ross (10th season)

1934 West Virginia Athletic Conference football standings
	Conf.					Overall
Team	W		L		T	W		L		T
Fairmont State $	5	–	0	–	0	6	–	2	–	0
West Virginia Wesleyan	4	–	0	–	0	6	–	3	–	1
Morris Harvey	3	–	2	–	1	3	–	5	–	1
Salem	4	–	3	–	0	4	–	5	–	0
Concord	2	–	2	–	0	4	–	3	–	0
West Liberty State	2	–	3	–	2	3	–	4	–	2
Potomac State	2	–	4	–	0	4	–	4	–	0
Glenville State	1	–	4	–	1	1	–	5	–	1
New River State	0	–	4	–	0	0	–	5	–	0
Davis & Elkins *	1	–	1	–	0	4	–	5	–	1
Marshall *	1	–	1	–	0	3	–	6	–	0
Shepherd *	1	–	2	–	0	1	–	5	–	0
$ – Conference champion; * – Did not qualify for conference standings Ties did not count in conference standings.

The 1934 West Virginia Wesleyan Bobcats football team represented West Virginia Wesleyan College as a member of the West Virginia Athletic Conference (WVAC) during the 1934 college football season. Led by tenth-year head coach Cebe Ross, the Bobcats compiled an overall record of 6–3–1 with a mark of 4–0 in conference play, placing second in the WVAC.

== Schedule ==
Date	Time	Opponent	Site	Result	Attendance	Source
September 22		at West Virginia*	Mountaineer Field; Morgantown, WV	L 0–19		
September 29		Glenville State	Buckhannon, WV	W 33–0		
October 6		at Davis & Elkins	Elkins, WV	W 19–18		
October 13		at NYU*	Ohio Field; Bronx, NY	W 21–3	15,000	
October 19		at Xavier*	Corcoran Field; Cincinnati, OH	L 6–13		
October 26		at Geneva*	Beaver Falls, PA	T 7–7		
November 2	8:15 p.m.	at Duquesne*	Forbes Field; Pittsburgh, PA	L 6–39		
November 17		Waynesburg*	Buckhannon, WV	W 19–0		
November 23		Salem	Buckhannon, WV	W 25–0		
November 29		at Marshall	Fairfield Stadium; Huntington, WV	W 39–0		
*Non-conference game; All times are in Eastern time
