= 1952 Shippensburg Red Raiders football team =

American college football season

1952 Shippensburg Red Raiders football
- Conference: Pennsylvania State Teachers College Conference
- Record: 7–0 (5–0 PSTCC)
- Head coach: Vinton Rambo (6th season)

1952 Pennsylvania State Teachers College Conference football standings
	Conf.					Overall
Team	W		L		T	W		L		T
West Chester $	5	–	0	–	0	7	–	0	–	0
Shippensburg	5	–	0	–	0	7	–	0	–	0
Clarion	4	–	0	–	0	9	–	0	–	0
Bloomsburg	2	–	1	–	1	5	–	2	–	1
Slippery Rock	2	–	2	–	0	4	–	3	–	1
Kutztown	3	–	3	–	0	3	–	4	–	0
Lock Haven	4	–	3	–	0	5	–	3	–	0
California (PA)	2	–	2	–	1	3	–	4	–	1
East Stroudsburg	1	–	3	–	0	4	–	4	–	0
Millersville	3	–	4	–	0	3	–	4	–	0
Indiana (PA)	1	–	4	–	0	4	–	4	–	0
Edinboro	1	–	4	–	0	3	–	4	–	0
Mansfield	1	–	5	–	0	2	–	6	–	0
Cheyney	0	–	3	–	0	1	–	5	–	0
$ – Conference champion; Conference standings were based on the Saylor system of ratings.

The 1952 Shippensburg Red Raiders football team was an American football team that represented Shippensburg State Teachers College (now known as Shippensburg University) in the Pennsylvania State Teachers College Conference (PSTCC) during the 1952 college football season. In their sixth year under head coach Vinton Rambo, the Red Raiders compiled a 7–0 record (5–0 in conference games), shut out four of seven opponents, and outscored all opponents by a total of 266 to 20. 1952 was Shippensburg's first of two consecutive perfect seasons, as the 1953 team went 8–0. Shippensburg had a 20-game winning streak that ran from November 3, 1951, to October 9, 1954.

== Schedule ==
Date	Opponent	Site	Result	Attendance	Source
September 27	at Trenton State*	Trenton, NJ	W 40–0		
October 4	Wilson Teachers*	Shippensburg, PA	W 31–0		
October 11	at East Stroudsburg	East Stroudsburg, PA	W 14–7		
October 18	Kutztown^{†}	Shippensburg, PA	W 58–0		
October 25	Slippery Rock	Shippensburg, PA	W 28–0		
November 1	at Millersville	Millersville, PA	W 49–7		
November 8	Cheyney	Shippensburg, PA	W 46–6		
*Non-conference game; ^{†}Homecoming
