= Herman R. Beckelheimer =

American football and basketball coach (1886–1971)

Biographical details
- Born: December 25, 1886; Dempsey, West Virginia, U.S.
- Died: January 21, 1971 (aged 84); Fayetteville, West Virginia, U.S.

Playing career

Football
- 1910–1913: Morris Harvey
- 1914–1915: Vanderbilt
- Position: Tackle

Coaching career (HC unless noted)

Football
- 1917: Morris Harvey
- 1919: Bethany (WV)
- 1920: Southern College
- 1921–1923: Morris Harvey

Basketball
- 1917–1918: Morris Harvey
- 1921–1923: Morris Harvey

Head coaching record
- Overall: 17–30–3 (football); 17–23 (basketball)

Herman Roy "Beck" Beckelheimer (December 25, 1886 – January 21, 1971) was an American football and basketball coach. He played college football at the University of Charleston (then known as Morris Harvey College) in Charleston, West Virginia from 1910 to 1913 before playing for the Vanderbilt Commodores football team in 1914 and 1915. Beckelheimer served as the head football coach at Morris Harvey in 1917 and from 1921 to 1923. He was also the head football coach at Bethany College in Bethany, West Virginia in 1919 and at Florida Southern College in 1920.

Beckelheimer died on January 21, 1971, at his home in Fayetteville, West Virginia.

== Head coaching record ==
=== Football ===
Year	Team	Overall	Conference	Standing	Bowl/playoffs
Morris Harvey (Independent) (1917)
1917	Morris Harvey	2–4–1			
Bethany Bison (Independent) (1919)
1919	Bethany	2–7			
Bethany:		2–7			
Southern College Blue and White (Independent) (1920)
1920	Southern College	3–2–1			
Southern College:		3–2–1			
Morris Harvey (Independent) (1921–1923)
1921	Morris Harvey	6–3			
1922	Morris Harvey	4–4–1			
1923	Morris Harvey	0–8			
Morris Harvey:		12–19–2			
Total:		17–30–3			
