= 1934 Marshall Thundering Herd football team =

American college football season

1934 Marshall Thundering Herd football
- Conference: Buckeye Athletic Association, West Virginia Athletic Conference
- Record: 3–6 (0–4 BAA, 1–1 WVAC)
- Head coach: Tom Dandelet (4th season)
- Captain: John Zontini
- Home stadium: Fairfield Stadium

1934 Buckeye Athletic Association football standings
	Conf.					Overall
Team	W		L		T	W		L		T
Cincinnati $	3	–	0	–	1	6	–	2	–	1
Ohio Wesleyan	3	–	1	–	0	7	–	2	–	0
Miami (OH)	2	–	2	–	0	5	–	4	–	0
Ohio	1	–	2	–	1	4	–	4	–	1
Marshall	0	–	4	–	0	3	–	6	–	0
+ – Conference co-champions

1934 West Virginia Athletic Conference football standings
	Conf.					Overall
Team	W		L		T	W		L		T
Fairmont State $	5	–	0	–	0	6	–	2	–	0
West Virginia Wesleyan	4	–	0	–	0	6	–	3	–	1
Morris Harvey	3	–	2	–	1	3	–	5	–	1
Salem	4	–	3	–	0	4	–	5	–	0
Concord	2	–	2	–	0	4	–	3	–	0
West Liberty State	2	–	3	–	2	3	–	4	–	2
Potomac State	2	–	4	–	0	4	–	4	–	0
Glenville State	1	–	4	–	1	1	–	5	–	1
New River State	0	–	4	–	0	0	–	5	–	0
Davis & Elkins *	1	–	1	–	0	4	–	5	–	1
Marshall *	1	–	1	–	0	3	–	6	–	0
Shepherd *	1	–	2	–	0	1	–	5	–	0
$ – Conference champion; * – Did not qualify for conference standings Ties did not count in conference standings.

The 1934 Marshall Thundering Herd football team was an American football team that represented Marshall College (now Marshall University) as a member of the Buckeye Athletic Association (BAA) and the West Virginia Athletic Conference (WVAC) during the 1934 college football season. In its fourth season under head coach Tom Dandelet, the Thundering Herd compiled an overall record of 3–6 record and was outscored by a total of 111 to 93. Marshall had a record of 0–4 in BAA play, placing last out of five teams, and a record of 1–1 against WVAC opponents, but did not play enough conference games to qualify for the WVAC standings. John Zontini was the team captain.

== Schedule ==
Date	Opponent	Site	Result	Attendance	Source
September 29	Transylvania*	Fairfield Stadium; Huntington, WV	W 12–0		
October 6	Bethany (WV)*	Fairfield Stadium; Huntington, WV	W 39–0		
October 13	Ohio Wesleyan	Fairfield Stadium; Huntington, WV	L 7–43		
October 19	Morris Harvey	Fairfield Stadium; Huntington, WV	W 29–0	4,000	
October 27	at Ohio	Ohio Field (rivalry); Athens, OH	L 0–8		
November 3	at Cincinnati	Nippert Stadium; Cincinnati, OH	L 0–7	6,500	
November 10	Emory and Henry*	Fairfield Stadium; Huntington, WV	L 6–7	6,000	
November 17	Miami (OH)	Fairfield Stadium; Huntington, WV	L 0–7	5,000	
November 29	West Virginia Wesleyan^{†}	Fairfield Stadium; Huntington, WV	L 0–39		
*Non-conference game; ^{†}Homecoming
