= Vinton Rambo =

American football and track and field coach, educator, college administrator

Biographical details
- Born: July 19, 1909; Keosauqua, Iowa, U.S.
- Died: July 23, 1980 (aged 71); Allentown, Pennsylvania, U.S.

Playing career

Football
- 1929–1930: Iowa Wesleyan
- Position: Center

Coaching career (HC unless noted)

Football
- 1931–1933: Orient HS (IA)
- 1934–1935: Teaneck HS (NJ)
- 1936–1942: Shippensburg (line)
- 1943: Saint Mary's Pre-Flight (assistant)
- 1946: Shippensburg (line)
- 1947–1954: Shippensburg

Basketball
- 1931–1934: Orient HS (IA)

Track
- 1931–1934: Orient HS (IA)
- 1934–1936: Teaneck HS (NJ)
- 1937–1953: Shippensburg

Head coaching record
- Overall: 45–16–3 (college football)

Vinton Holtz Rambo (July 19, 1909 – July 23, 1980) was an American football and track coach, educator, and college administrator. He served as the head football coach at the State Teachers College at Shippensburg—now known as Shippensburg University of Pennsylvania—from 1947 to 1954, compiling a record of 45–16–3 and leading the Shippensburg Red Raiders football program to consecutive perfect seasons in 1952 and 1953. Rambo was also the head track coach at Shippensburg from 1937 to 1953 and the school's dean of men from 1939 to 1962. He concluded his career at Kutztown State College—now known as Kutztown University of Pennsylvania—first as dean of men from 1968 to 1971 and then as director of development from 1971 to 1974.

== Early life, playing career, and education ==
Rambo was born on July 19, 1909, in Keosauqua, Iowa, to Rex Vale Rambo and Bertha Camblin. He attended Iowa Wesleyan College—now known as Iowa Wesleyan University—where he played football as a center and ran track before graduating in 1931. Rambo earned a master's degree in health and physical education from Columbia University in 1935.

== Coaching career ==
Rambo began his coaching and teaching career in 1931 at the high school in Orient, Iowa, where he coached football, basketball, and track for three years. In 1934, he was hired as football and track coach at Teaneck High School in Teaneck, New Jersey. Rambo's football teams at Teaneck went 1–6–1 in 1934 and 2–4–2 in 1935. His track squad won the Bergen Country Interscholastic League championship in 1935.

Rambo went to State Teachers College at Shippensburg—now known as Shippensburg University of Pennsylvania—in 1936 to serve as line coach under head football coach Eddie Gulian. In 1939, he took on the position of dean of men at the school. During World War II, Rambo served as an officer in the United States Navy with the Air Corps Physical Training V-5 Program headed by Tom Hamilton. He was stationed at the Saint Mary's Pre-Flight School at Saint Mary's College of California and then at Naval Air Station Jacksonville. He returned to Shippensburg in 1946 and succeeded Gulian as head football coach in 1947.

In eight seasons as head football coach at Shippensburg, Rambo amassed a record of 45–16–3. His teams won 20 consecutive games between 1951 and 1954, including back-to-back perfect seasons in 1952 and 1953. The Red Raiders won 24 of the final 25 games during Rambo's tenure.

== Later career and death ==
Rambo stepped down from coaching after the 1954 season, but remained at Shippensburg as dean of men until 1962. He earned a doctorate in education from Columbia in 1956.

In 1968, Rambo was named dean of men at Kutztown State College—now known as Kutztown University of Pennsylvania. In 1971, he became the first full-time director of development at Kutztown State.

Rambo died on July 23, 1980, at the Allentown and Sacred Heart Hospital Center in Allentown, Pennsylvania.

== Head coaching record ==
=== College football ===
Year	Team	Overall	Conference	Standing	Bowl/playoffs
Shippensburg Red Raiders (Pennsylvania State Teachers College Conference) (1947–1954)
1947	Shippensburg	5–2–1	5–2–1	5th	
1948	Shippensburg	5–3	4–3	7th	
1949	Shippensburg	1–6–1	1–5–1	10th	
1950	Shippensburg	7–1–1	5–1–1	3rd	
1951	Shippensburg	5–3	4–3	6th	
1952	Shippensburg	7–0	5–0	2nd	
1953	Shippensburg	8–0	6–0	2nd	
1954	Shippensburg	7–1	4–1	4th	
Shippensburg:		45–16–3	34–15–3		
Total:		45–16–3			
