= Homer Martin =

Homer Martin may refer to:

- Homer Martin (labor leader) (1901–1968), American trade unionist and socialist
- Homer Dodge Martin (1836–1897), American artist
- Homer C. Martin, American college football head coach (1923-1926, 1936)
- Homer Martin (triple jumper) (born 1901), American triple jumper, 3rd at the 1926 USA Outdoor Track and Field Championships
