= 2024 Charleston Golden Eagles football team =

American college football season

2024 Charleston Golden Eagles football
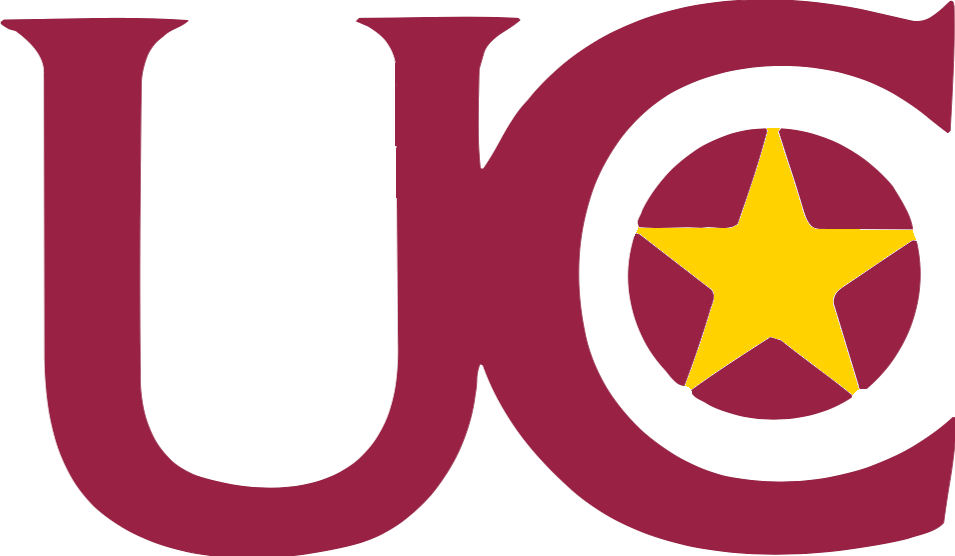

MEC champion

NCAA Division II first round, L 38–40 vs. Ashland
- Conference: Mountain East Conference

Ranking
- AFCA: No. 15
- Record: 11–1 (9–0 MEC)
- Head coach: Quinn Sanders (3rd season)
- Offensive coordinator: Michael Tesch (1st season)
- Defensive coordinator: Marshall Cooper (3rd season)
- Home stadium: University of Charleston Stadium at Laidley Field

2024 Mountain East Conference football standings
	Conf.			Overall
Team	W		L	W		L
No. 15 Charleston (WV) $^	9	–	0	11	–	1
Glenville State	7	–	2	7	–	4
Fairmont State	6	–	3	7	–	4
UNC Pembroke	6	–	3	6	–	5
Wheeling	5	–	4	6	–	5
West Virginia State	5	–	4	6	–	5
Frostburg State	4	–	5	6	–	5
West Liberty	2	–	7	2	–	9
Concord	1	–	8	1	–	10
West Virginia Wesleyan	0	–	9	0	–	11
$ – Conference champion; ^ – NCAA Division II playoff participant; Rankings from AFCA Poll

The 2024 Charleston Golden Eagles football program represented University of Charleston as a member of the Mountain East Conference (MEC) during the 2024 NCAA Division II football season. Led by Quinn Sanders in his third and final season as head coach, the Golden Eagles compiled an overall record of 11–1 with a mark of 9–0 in conference play, winning the MEC title. Charleston advanced to the NCAA Division II football championship playoffs, where the Golden Eagles lost in the first round to Ashland. The team played home games at University of Charleston Stadium at Laidley Field in Charleston, West Virginia.

== Preseason ==
=== MEC media poll ===
The MEC preseason poll was released on August 12, 2024. Charleston was predicted to finish first in the conference.

== Schedule ==
Date	Time	Opponent	Rank	Site	Result	Attendance
September 1	6:00 p.m.	at Livingstone*	No. 23	Alumni Memorial Field; Salisbury, NC	W 38–7	1,470
September 7	3:05 p.m.	California (PA)*	No. 23	University of Charleston Stadium at Laidley Field; Charleston, WV	W 23–19	256
September 21	1:00 p.m.	UNC Pembroke	No. 19	University of Charleston Stadium at Laidley Field; Charleston, WV	W 58–36	487
September 28	1:00 p.m.	at Concord	No. 19	Callaghan Stadium; Athens, WV	W 42–7	1,257
October 5	12:01 p.m.	Glenville State	No. 16	University of Charleston Stadium at Laidley Field; Charleston, WV	W 29–17	1,136
October 12	12:00 p.m.	Wheeling	No. 14	University of Charleston Stadium at Laidley Field; Charleston, WV	W 42–23	1,269
October 19	1:00 p.m.	at No. 22 Frostburg State	No. 13	Bobcat Stadium; Frostburg, MD	W 48–7	3,550
October 25	7:01 p.m.	Fairmont State	No. 11	University of Charleston Stadium at Laidley Field; Charleston, WV	W 50–30	1,229
November 2	11:00 a.m.	at West Liberty	No. 9	West Family Stadium; West Liberty, WV	W 38–0	1,402
November 9	1:00 p.m	at West Virginia Wesleyan	No. 6	Cebe Ross Field; Buckhannon, WV	W 69–21	400
November 16	12:00 p.m.	West Virginia State	No. 6	University of Charleston Stadium at Laidley Field; Charleston, WV	W 52–17	1,375
November 23	1:00 p.m.	Ashland*	No. 6	University of Charleston Stadium at Laidley Field; Charleston, WV (NCAA Division II first round)	L 38–40	1,028
*Non-conference game; Rankings from AFCA Poll released prior to the game; All times are in Eastern time

== Rankings ==
Ranking movements Legend: ██ Increase in ranking ██ Decrease in ranking
	Week													
Poll	Pre	1	2	3	4	5	6	7	8	9	10	11	12	Final
AFCA	23	23	20	19	19	16	14	13	11	9	6	6	6	15
D2 Football	24	25	24	22	22	18	16	16	14	12	9	9	9	18
