= 1934 Miami Redskins football team =

American college football season

1934 Miami Redskins football
- Conference: Buckeye Athletic Association
- Record: 5–4 (2–2 BAA)
- Head coach: Frank Wilton (3rd season)
- Home stadium: Miami Field

1934 Buckeye Athletic Association football standings
	Conf.					Overall
Team	W		L		T	W		L		T
Cincinnati $	3	–	0	–	1	6	–	2	–	1
Ohio Wesleyan	3	–	1	–	0	7	–	2	–	0
Miami (OH)	2	–	2	–	0	5	–	4	–	0
Ohio	1	–	2	–	1	4	–	4	–	1
Marshall	0	–	4	–	0	3	–	6	–	0
+ – Conference co-champions

The 1934 Miami Redskins football team was an American football team that represented Miami University as a member of the Buckeye Athletic Association (BAA) during the 1934 college football season. In its third season under head coach Frank Wilton, Miami compiled a 5–4 record (2–2 against conference opponents) and finished in third place out of five teams in the BAA.

== Schedule ==
Date	Opponent	Site	Result	Attendance	Source
September 29	Eastern Kentucky*	Miami Field; Oxford, OH	W 19–0		
October 6	at Carnegie Tech	Pittsburgh, PA	L 7–13		
October 13	Hanover	Miami Field; Oxford, OH	W 39–6		
October 20	Ohio	Miami Field; Oxford, OH (rivalry)	W 7–0		
October 26	at John Carroll	Cleveland, OH	L 0–20		
November 3	Ohio Wesleyan	Miami Field; Oxford, OH	L 6–10		
November 10	at Wittenberg	Springfield, OH	W 33–0		
November 17	at Marshall	Huntington, WV	W 7–0	5,000	
November 29	at Cincinnati	Nippert Stadium; Cincinnati, OH (Victory Bell)	L 0–21		
*Non-conference game
