= 1934 Cincinnati Bearcats football team =

American college football season

1934 Cincinnati Bearcats football

BAA champion
- Conference: Buckeye Athletic Association
- Record: 6–2–1 (3–0–1 BAA)
- Head coach: Dana M. King (4th season)
- Captain: George Smith
- Home stadium: Nippert Stadium

1934 Buckeye Athletic Association football standings
| | Conf. | | | | | Overall |
| Team | W | | L | | T | W | | L | | T |
|---|---|---|---|---|---|---|---|---|---|---|
| Cincinnati $ | 3 | – | 0 | – | 1 | 6 | – | 2 | – | 1 |
| Ohio Wesleyan | 3 | – | 1 | – | 0 | 7 | – | 2 | – | 0 |
| Miami (OH) | 2 | – | 2 | – | 0 | 5 | – | 4 | – | 0 |
| Ohio | 1 | – | 2 | – | 1 | 4 | – | 4 | – | 1 |
| Marshall | 0 | – | 4 | – | 0 | 3 | – | 6 | – | 0 |
+ – Conference co-champions

The 1934 Cincinnati Bearcats football team was an American football team that represented the University of Cincinnati as a member of the Buckeye Athletic Association during the 1934 college football season. In their fourth and final season under head coach Dana M. King, the Bearcats compiled a 6–2–1 record (3–0–1 against conference opponents).

== Schedule ==
| Date | Opponent | Site | Result | Attendance | Source |
|---|---|---|---|---|---|
| September 29 | Otterbein* | Nippert Stadium; Cincinnati, OH | W 45–0 | | |
| October 10 | Kentucky* | Nippert Stadium; Cincinnati, OH | L 0–27 | | |
| October 13 | at Vanderbilt* | Dudley Field; Nashville, TN | L 0–32 | | |
| October 20 | Ashland* | Nippert Stadium; Cincinnati, OH | W 32–6 | | |
| October 27 | Georgetown (KY)* | Nippert Stadium; Cincinnati, OH | W 45–0 | | |
| November 3 | Marshall | Nippert Stadium; Cincinnati, OH | W 7–0 | 6,500 | |
| November 10 | at Ohio | Peden Stadium; Athens, OH | T 0–0 | | |
| November 17 | Ohio Wesleyan | Nippert Stadium; Cincinnati, OH | W 13–6 | | |
| November 29 | Miami (OH) | Nippert Stadium; Cincinnati, OH | W 21–0 | | |
*Non-conference game
