= Hubert Jack =

American wrestling and football coach

Biographical details
- Born: February 23, 1904; Grove City, Pennsylvania, U.S.
- Died: March 15, 1981 (aged 77); Princeton, New Jersey, U.S.

Coaching career (HC unless noted)

Football
- 1926–1936: Grove City HS (PA) (assistant)
- 1937–1942: DuBois HS (PA)
- 1946–1968: Lock Haven

Wrestling
- 1926–1937: Grove City HS (PA)
- 1937–1943: DuBois HS (PA)
- 1943–1962: Lock Haven

Track
- 1926–1937: Grove City HS (PA)

Head coaching record
- Overall: 102–91–7 (college football); 153–39–5 (college wrestling)

Accomplishments and honors

Championships
- Football; 1 PSTCC (1957); 1 PSCAC West Division (1960)

Awards
- Helms Foundation Wrestling Hall of Fame (1963)

Hubert Hosack Jack (February 23, 1904 – March 15, 1981) was an American football and wrestling coach. He was the head wrestling coach at Lock Haven University of Pennsylvania from 1943 to 1962 and football coach from 1946 to 1968. He led the wrestling team to a 153–39–5 record and the football team to a 102–91–7 record. He retired from coaching in January 1969.

Jack was graduate of Grove City High School in Grove City, Pennsylvania, Slippery Rock State Teachers College—now known as Slippery Rock University—in Slippery Rock, Pennsylvania, and the University of Pittsburgh.

== Death and honors ==
Jack died on March 15, 1981, while attending the NCAA Division I Wrestling Championships in Princeton, New Jersey.

Jack was inducted into the Helms Hall Amateur Wrestling Hall of Fame in 1963 and the Lock Haven Hall of Fame in 2015. Hubert Jack Stadium, Lock Haven's home football venue, is named in his honor.

== Head coaching record ==
=== College football ===
| Year | Team | Overall | Conference | Standing | Bowl/playoffs |
|---|---|---|---|---|---|
Lock Haven Bald Eagles (Pennsylvania State Teachers College Conference / Pennsylvania State College Athletic Conference) (1946–1968)
| 1946 | Lock Haven | 4–5–1 | 3–4–1 | 9th | |
| 1947 | Lock Haven | 7–2–1 | 4–2–1 | 6th | |
| 1948 | Lock Haven | 6–4 | 3–2 | T–4th | |
| 1949 | Lock Haven | 3–7 | 2–3 | 9th | |
| 1950 | Lock Haven | 5–4 | 3–2 | 4th | |
| 1951 | Lock Haven | 0–8 | 0–6 | T–11th | |
| 1952 | Lock Haven | 5–3 | 4–3 | 7th | |
| 1953 | Lock Haven | 4–4 | 4–4 | T–11th | |
| 1954 | Lock Haven | 5–3–1 | 4–3–1 | 7th | |
| 1955 | Lock Haven | 5–2–2 | 5–2–1 | 3rd | |
| 1956 | Lock Haven | 6–2 | 4–2 | 6th | |
| 1957 | Lock Haven | 8–0 | 5–0 | T–1st | |
| 1958 | Lock Haven | 5–3 | 5–2 | 4th | |
| 1959 | Lock Haven | 6–2 | 5–2 | 6th | |
| 1960 | Lock Haven | 8–2 | 6–1 | 1st (West) | |
| 1961 | Lock Haven | 5–2–2 | 2–2–1 | 4th (West) | |
| 1962 | Lock Haven | 2–6 | 2–6 | 6th (West) | |
| 1963 | Lock Haven | 2–6 | 0–6 | 7th (West) | |
| 1964 | Lock Haven | 4–4 | 2–4 | 6th (West) | |
| 1965 | Lock Haven | 5–3 | 3–3 | T–3rd (West) | |
| 1966 | Lock Haven | 2–7 | 2–3 | T–3rd (West) | |
| 1967 | Lock Haven | 3–5 | 3–2 | T–2nd (West) | |
| 1968 | Lock Haven | 2–7 | 1–4 | 6th (West) | |
| Lock Haven: | | 102–91–7 | 72–68–5 | | |
| Total: | | 102–91–7 | | | |
National championship Conference title Conference division title or championship game berth
