= 1952 West Chester Golden Rams football team =

American college football season

1952 West Chester Golden Rams football

PSTCC champion
- Conference: Pennsylvania State Teachers College Conference
- Record: 7–0 (5–0 PSTCC)
- Head coach: Glenn Killinger (15th season)
- Captains: Earl Hersch; Charles Weber
- Home stadium: Wayne Field

1952 Pennsylvania State Teachers College Conference football standings
	Conf.					Overall
Team	W		L		T	W		L		T
West Chester $	5	–	0	–	0	7	–	0	–	0
Shippensburg	5	–	0	–	0	7	–	0	–	0
Clarion	4	–	0	–	0	9	–	0	–	0
Bloomsburg	2	–	1	–	1	5	–	2	–	1
Slippery Rock	2	–	2	–	0	4	–	3	–	1
Kutztown	3	–	3	–	0	3	–	4	–	0
Lock Haven	4	–	3	–	0	5	–	3	–	0
California (PA)	2	–	2	–	1	3	–	4	–	1
East Stroudsburg	1	–	3	–	0	4	–	4	–	0
Millersville	3	–	4	–	0	3	–	4	–	0
Indiana (PA)	1	–	4	–	0	4	–	4	–	0
Edinboro	1	–	4	–	0	3	–	4	–	0
Mansfield	1	–	5	–	0	2	–	6	–	0
Cheyney	0	–	3	–	0	1	–	5	–	0
$ – Conference champion; Conference standings were based on the Saylor system of ratings.

The 1952 West Chester Golden Rams football team was an American football team that represented West Chester State College (now known as West Chester University) as a member of the Pennsylvania State Teachers College Conference (PSTCC) during the 1952 college football season. In their 15th year under head coach Glenn Killinger, the Golden Rams compiled a perfect 7–0 record (5–0 against PSTCC opponents), won the PSTCC championship, and outscored opponents by a total of 291 to 44.

The team's statistical leaders included Paschal Gazzillo with 474 rushing yards, Ray Spafford with 612 passing yards, Dick Paciaroni with 221 receiving yards, and Earl Hersh with 89 points scored (14 touchdowns and 12 extra points). Earl Hersch and Charles Weber were the team captains.

The 1952 season was one of five perfect seasons in West Chester Rams football history, the others being 1923, 1928, 1957, and 1960.

The team played its home game at Wayne Field in West Chester, Pennsylvania.

== Schedule ==
Date	Opponent	Site	Result	Attendance	Source
September 19	Pennsylvania Military*	Wayne Field; West Chester, PA	W 21–6	> 5,000	
October 11	at Delaware*	Wilmington, DE	W 24–20	6,000	
October 17	Lock Haven	Wayne Field; West Chester, PA	W 74–6	3,000	
October 24	East Stroudsburg	Wayne Field; West Chester, PA	W 41–0		
November 1	Kutztown	Wayne Field; West Chester, PA	W 50–0	1,100	
November 8	at Millersville	Millersville, PA	W 55–0	1,000	
November 14	Bloomsburg	Wayne Field; West Chester, PA	W 26–6	8,000	
*Non-conference game
