= 1946 West Chester Golden Rams football team =

American college football season

1946 West Chester Golden Rams football
- Conference: Pennsylvania State Teachers College Conference
- Record: 9–1 (2–1 PSTCC)
- Head coach: Glenn Killinger (10th season)

1946 Pennsylvania State Teachers College Conference football standings
	Conf.					Overall
Team	W		L		T	W		L		T
California (PA) $	4	–	0	–	0	9	–	0	–	0
Mansfield	5	–	0	–	1	7	–	0	–	1
West Chester	2	–	1	–	0	9	–	1	–	0
Slippery Rock	2	–	1	–	0	3	–	4	–	1
Indiana (PA)	3	–	3	–	0	5	–	3	–	0
Bloomsburg	3	–	3	–	1	4	–	3	–	1
Millersville	3	–	3	–	0	3	–	3	–	0
Clarion	2	–	2	–	0	3	–	4	–	0
Lock Haven	3	–	4	–	1	4	–	5	–	1
East Stroudsburg	1	–	2	–	0	5	–	2	–	0
Shippensburg	2	–	5	–	1	2	–	5	–	1
Kutztown	1	–	4	–	0	3	–	4	–	0
Edinboro	0	–	3	–	0	0	–	6	–	0
$ – Conference champion

The 1946 West Chester Golden Rams football team was an American football team that represented West Chester State Teachers College (now known as West Chester University) as a member of the Pennsylvania State Teachers College Conference (PSTCC) during the 1946 college football season. In their 10th year under head coach Glenn Killinger, the Golden Rams compiled an overall record of 9–1 with a mark of 2–1 in conference play, tying for third place in the PSTCC. The team outscored its opponents by a total of 187 to 33.

At a time when college football was not fully integrated, the West Chester team featured Johnny Eaton, an African-American back from Abington, Pennsylvania.

== Schedule ==
Date	Opponent	Site	Result	Attendance	Source
September 20	vs. Moravian*	Bethlehem, PA	W 13–6	6,000	
September 27	Drexel*	Wayne Field; West Chester, PA	W 12–0		
October 5	at CCNY*	Lewisohn Stadium; New York, NY	W 20–0		
October 11	Pennsylvania Military*	Wayne Field; West Chester, PA	W 40–0	3,000	
October 18	Lock Haven	Wayne Field; West Chester, PA	L 6–13	5,000	
October 25	East Stroudsburg	Wayne Field; West Chester, PA	W 13–7		
November 2	at Albright*	Reading, PA	W 26–0	4,000	
November 8	at Ithaca*	Ithaca High School Field; Ithaca, NY	W 13–7		
November 16	at Millersville	Millersville, PA	W 12–0		
November 23	at Wagner*	Staten Island, NY	W 32–0		
*Non-conference game
