= 1946 Marshall Thundering Herd football team =

American college football season

1946 Marshall Thundering Herd football
- Conference: West Virginia Intercollegiate Athletic Conference
- Record: 2–7–1 (2–0 WVIAC)
- Head coach: Cam Henderson (9th season)
- Captains: Jack Chapman; Don Gibson
- Home stadium: Fairfield Stadium

1946 West Virginia Intercollegiate Athletic Conference football standings
	Conf.					Overall
Team	W		L		T	W		L		T
West Liberty State $	4	–	0	–	0	7	–	2	–	0
Potomac State	7	–	1	–	0	7	–	2	–	0
West Virginia Tech	5	–	1	–	0	6	–	2	–	0
Fairmont State	3	–	1	–	1	4	–	3	–	1
West Virginia Wesleyan	4	–	3	–	0	6	–	3	–	0
Davis & Elkins	2	–	3	–	1	3	–	5	–	2
Morris Harvey	2	–	3	–	0	2	–	5	–	0
Concord	1	–	3	–	2	1	–	5	–	2
Glenville State	1	–	5	–	2	1	–	5	–	2
Shepherd	1	–	5	–	0	1	–	5	–	0
Salem	0	–	5	–	0	0	–	8	–	0
Marshall *	2	–	0	–	0	2	–	7	–	1
Bethany (WV) *	0	–	2	–	0	1	–	7	–	0
$ – Conference champion; * – Did not qualify for conference standings Ties did not count in conference standings.

The 1946 Marshall Thundering Herd football team was an American football team that represented Marshall University as a member of the West Virginia Intercollegiate Athletic Conference (WVIAC) during the 1946 college football season. In its ninth season under head coach Cam Henderson, the team compiled a 2–7–1 record and was outscored by a total of 190 to 145. Jack Chapman and Don Gibson were the team captains.

== Schedule ==
Date	Opponent	Site	Result	Attendance	Source
September 28	West Virginia Wesleyan	Fairfield Stadium; Huntington, WV	W 29–12		
October 5	at Cincinnati*	Nippert Stadium; Cincinnati, OH	L 14–39	20,000	
October 12	Toledo*	Fairfield Stadium; Huntington, WV	T 14–14		
October 19	Evansville*	Fairfield Stadium; Huntington, WV	L 0–7	6,000	
October 26	at Scranton*	Scranton, PA	L 6–14		
November 2	at Morris Harvey	Laidley Field; Charleston, WV	W 34–0		
November 9	at Murray State*	Murray, KY	L 0–19		
November 16	Morehead State*^{†}	Fairfield Stadium; Huntington, WV	L 20–29		
November 23	at Dayton*	UD Stadium; Dayton, OH	L 7–29		
November 28	Xavier*	Fairfield Stadium; Huntington, WV	L 21–27	8,000	
*Non-conference game; ^{†}Homecoming
