= Alderson Propps =

American football player and coach (1912–1993)

Biographical details
- Born: October 17, 1912; Fayetteville, West Virginia, U.S.
- Died: August 10, 1993 (aged 80); Orange County, Florida, U.S.

Playing career

Football
- 1933–1936: Emory and Henry
- Position: End

Coaching career (HC unless noted)

Football
- 1937–?: Pulaski HS (VA)
- 1946: Morris Harvey

Head coaching record
- Overall: 0–2 (college)

Alderson "Stretch" Propps (October 17, 1912 – August 10, 1993) was an American football player and coach. Propps was the athletic director and head football coach at the Morris Harvey College—now known as University of Charleston—in Charleston, West Virginia in 1946. He resigned after the first two games of the football season and was succeeded as head football coach his assistant Eddie King.

Propps was born on October 17, 1912, in Fayetteville, West Virginia. He died on August 10, 1993.

== Head coaching record ==
=== College ===
Year	Team	Overall	Conference	Standing	Bowl/playoffs
Morris Harvey Golden Eagles (West Virginia Intercollegiate Athletic Conference) (1946)
1946	Morris Harvey	0–2 (Note: Propps resigned after the first two games of the 1946 season. Eddie King replaced him as head coach and led Morris Harvey for the final five games of the season. The Golden Eagles finished 2–5 overall and 2–3 in West Virginia Intercollegiate Athletic Conference play, placing seventh.)	0–1		
Morris Harvey:		0–2	0–1		
Total:		0–2			
