= 2023 Charleston Golden Eagles football team =

American college football season

2023 Charleston Golden Eagles football

MEC champion

NCAA Division II second round, L 31–32 vs. Kutztown
- Conference: Mountain East Conference

Ranking
- AFCA: No. 19
- Record: 10–2 (8–1 MEC)
- Head coach: Quinn Sanders (2nd season)
- Defensive coordinator: Marshall Cooper (2nd season)
- Home stadium: University of Charleston Stadium at Laidley Field

2023 Mountain East Conference football standings
| | Conf. | | | Overall |
| Team | W | | L | W | | L |
|---|---|---|---|---|---|---|
| No. 19 Charleston (WV) $^ | 8 | – | 1 | 10 | – | 2 |
| Fairmont State | 6 | – | 3 | 8 | – | 3 |
| Frostburg State | 6 | – | 3 | 7 | – | 3 |
| Notre Dame (OH) | 6 | – | 3 | 7 | – | 3 |
| UNC Pembroke | 6 | – | 3 | 7 | – | 3 |
| Glenville State | 5 | – | 4 | 6 | – | 4 |
| Wheeling | 4 | – | 5 | 5 | – | 5 |
| West Liberty | 4 | – | 5 | 4 | – | 6 |
| West Virginia State | 4 | – | 5 | 4 | – | 6 |
| Concord | 1 | – | 9 | 1 | – | 10 |
| West Virginia Wesleyan | 0 | – | 9 | 0 | – | 10 |
$ – Conference champion; ^ – NCAA Division II playoff participant; Rankings from AFCA Poll

The 2023 Charleston Golden Eagles football program represented University of Charleston as a member of the Mountain East Conference (MEC) during the 2023 NCAA Division II football season. Led by second-year head coach Quinn Sanders. the Golden Eagles compiled an overall record of 10–2 with a mark of 8–1 in conference play, winning the MEC title.

== Schedule ==
| Date | Time | Opponent | Rank | Site | Result | Attendance |
|---|---|---|---|---|---|---|
| August 31 | 6:00 p.m. | Gannon* | | University of Charleston Stadium at Laidley Field; Charleston, WV | W 22–13 | 347 |
| September 7 | 6:30 p.m. | Concord | | University of Charleston Stadium at Laidley Field; Charleston, WV | W 42–7 | 428 |
| September 16 | 12:00 p.m. | at UNC Pembroke | | Grace P. Johnson Stadium; Pembroke, NC | W 37–29 | 3,972 |
| September 23 | 12:00 p.m. | West Virginia Wesleyan^{†} | | University of Charleston Stadium at Laidley Field; Charleston, WV | W 76–16 | 683 |
| September 30 | 1:00 p.m. | at Glenville State | | I.L. & Sue Morris Stadium; Glenville, WV | W 52–17 | 1,000 |
| October 14 | 11:00 a.m. | Notre Dame (OH) | | University of Charleston Stadium at Laidley Field; Charleston, WV | W 52–27 | 18,000 |
| October 21 | 1:00 p.m. | at Fairmont State | | Duvall-Rosier Field; Fairmont, WV | L 30–33 | 1,016 |
| October 28 | 12:00 p.m. | Frostburg State | | University of Charleston Stadium at Laidley Field; Charleston, WV | W 28–25 | 500 |
| November 2 | 6:00 p.m. | West Liberty | | University of Charleston Stadium at Laidley Field; Charleston, WV | W 42–17 | 567 |
| November 11 | 12:00 p.m. | at West Virginia State | | Lakin-Ray Field at Dickerson Stadium; Institute, WV | W 52–20 | 2,100 |
| November 18 | 12:00 p.m. | New Haven* | No. 24 | University of Charleston Stadium at Laidley Field; Charleston, WV (NCAA Division II First Round) | W 52–44 | 1,212 |
| November 25 | 12:00 p.m. | No. 7 Kutztown* | No. 24 | University of Charleston Stadium at Laidley Field; Charleston, WV (NCAA Division II Second Round) | L 31–32 | 686 |
*Non-conference game; ^{†}Homecoming; Rankings from AFCA Poll released prior to the game; All times are in Eastern time

== Rankings ==
Ranking movements Legend: ██ Increase in ranking ██ Decrease in ranking
| | Week | | | | | | | | | | | | |
| Poll | Pre | 1 | 2 | 3 | 4 | 5 | 6 | 7 | 8 | 9 | 10 | 11 | Final |
|---|---|---|---|---|---|---|---|---|---|---|---|---|---|
| AFCA | | | | | | | | | | | | 24 | 19 |

== Preseason ==
=== MEC media poll ===
The MEC preseason poll was released on August 14, 2023. Charleston was predicted to finished third in the conference.
