= Eddie King (coach) =

American football and basketball coach, athletics administrator, educator

Biographical details
- Born: July 9, 1912; War Eagle, West Virginia, U.S.
- Died: August 12, 1963 (aged 51); Charleston, West Virginia, U.S.

Playing career

Football
- 1933–1935: Marshall
- Positions: Center, guard

Coaching career (HC unless noted)

Football
- 1942–1943: Charleston HS (WV) (assistant)
- 1945: Charleston HS (WV)
- 1946: Morris Harvey (assistant)
- 1946–1956: Morris Harvey

Basketball
- 1946–1956: Morris Harvey

Administrative career (AD unless noted)
- 1946–1957: Morris Harvey

Head coaching record
- Overall: 63–33–4 (college football)
- Bowls: 3–1

Accomplishments and honors

Championships
- Football; 5 WVIAC (1948, 1950–1951, 1953–1954)

Carl Edward King (July 9, 1912 – August 12, 1963) was an American football and basketball coach, college athletics administrator, and educator. He served as the head football coach, head basketball coach, and athletic director at Morris Harvey College—now known as the University of Charleston—in Charleston, West Virginia from 1946 to 1957.

King attended Huntington High School in Huntington, West Virginia, where he was an all-state center in 1930. He then played college football at Marshall College—now known as Marshall University at the center and guard positions under head coach Cam Henderson. King later earned a master's degree from the University of Michigan in education and physical education.

King came to Morris Harvey in 1946 as an assistant football coach under Alderson Propps. When Propps resigned in October of that year, King succeeded him as head football coach, first in an acting capacity and later on a permanent basis.

King died on August 12, 1963, at a hospital in Charleston, West Virginia, following an illness lasting six weeks.

== Head coaching record ==
=== College football ===
| Year | Team | Overall | Conference | Standing | Bowl/playoffs |
|---|---|---|---|---|---|
Morris Harvey Golden Eagles (West Virginia Intercollegiate Athletic Conference) (1946–1956)
| 1946 | Morris Harvey | 2–3 (Note: Alderson Propps resigned after the first two games of the 1946 season. King replaced him as head coach and led Morris Harvey for the final five games of the season. The Golden Eagles finished 2–5 overall and 2–3 in West Virginia Intercollegiate Athletic Conference play.) | 2–2 | 7th | |
| 1947 | Morris Harvey | 4–5 | 3–3 | 7th | |
| 1948 | Morris Harvey | 5–2–2 | 3–0–1 | 1st | |
| 1949 | Morris Harvey | 7–2 | 3–1 | 3rd | |
| 1950 | Morris Harvey | 10–0 | 5–0 | T–1st | W Tangerine |
| 1951 | Morris Harvey | 6–3–1 | 4–0 | 1st | W Burley |
| 1952 | Morris Harvey | 6–3 | 4–0 | 2nd | |
| 1953 | Morris Harvey | 6–4–1 | 4–0 | 1st | W Elks |
| 1954 | Morris Harvey | 8–2 | 4–0 | 1st | L Cigar |
| 1955 | Morris Harvey | 4–5 | 2–0 | NA | |
| 1956 | Morris Harvey | 5–4 | 1–0 | NA | |
| Morris Harvey: | | 63–33–4 | 35–6–1 | | |
| Total: | | 63–33–4 | | | |
National championship Conference title Conference division title or championship game berth
