= 1934 Ohio Bobcats football team =

American college football season

1934 Ohio Bobcats football
- Conference: Buckeye Athletic Association
- Record: 4–4–1 (1–2–1 BAA)
- Head coach: Don Peden (11th season)
- Home stadium: Ohio Field

1934 Buckeye Athletic Association football standings
	Conf.					Overall
Team	W		L		T	W		L		T
Cincinnati $	3	–	0	–	1	6	–	2	–	1
Ohio Wesleyan	3	–	1	–	0	7	–	2	–	0
Miami (OH)	2	–	2	–	0	5	–	4	–	0
Ohio	1	–	2	–	1	4	–	4	–	1
Marshall	0	–	4	–	0	3	–	6	–	0
+ – Conference co-champions

The 1934 Ohio Bobcats football team was an American football team that represented Ohio University as a member of the Buckeye Athletic Association (BAA) during the 1933 college football season. In their 11th season under head coach Don Peden, the Bobcats compiled a 4–4–1 record and outscored opponents by a total of 116 to 67.

== Schedule ==
Date	Opponent	Site	Result	Source
September 22	Rio Grande	Ohio Field; Athens, OH	W 53–0	
September 29	at Indiana	Memorial Stadium; Bloomington, IN	L 0–27	
October 13	Georgetown (KY)	Ohio Field; Athens, OH	W 36–6	
October 20	Miami (OH)	Miami Field; Oxford, OH (rivalry)	L 0–7	
October 27	Marshall	Ohio Field; Athens, OH (rivalry)	W 8–0	
November 3	vs. West Virginia	Parkersburg, WV	L 2–7	
November 10	vs. Cincinnati	Ohio Field; Athens, OH	T 0–0	
November 17	at Dayton	University of Dayton Stadium; Dayton, OH	W 17–0	
November 24	Ohio Wesleyan	Delaware, OH	L 0–20	
