= Quinn Sanders =

American football coach (born c. 1989)

Current position
- Title: Co-offensive coordinator & quarterbacks coach
- Team: Northern Illinois
- Conference: MAC

Biographical details
- Born: c. 1989 (age 36–37); Santa Rosa Beach, Florida, U.S.
- Education: University of Charleston (2011)

Playing career
- 2008–2011: Charleston (WV)
- Positions: Wide receiver, defensive back

Coaching career (HC unless noted)
- 2012–2013: Charleston (WV) (QB/RB)
- 2014: Midwestern State (GA/RB)
- 2015–2016: Charleston (WV) (WR)
- 2017–2019: Charleston (WV) (QB)
- 2020–2021: Charleston (WV) (OC)
- 2022–2024: Charleston (WV)
- 2025: Northern Illinois (OC/QB)
- 2026-present: Northern Illinois (Co-OC/QB)

Head coaching record
- Overall: 27–8
- Tournaments: 1–2 (NCAA D–II playoffs)

Accomplishments and honors

Championships
- 2 MEC (2023–2024)

Awards
- 2× MEC COY (2023–2024)

Quinn Sanders (born c. 1989) is an American college football coach. He is the co-offensive coordinator and quarterbacks coach for Northern Illinois University, a position he has held since 2026. He was the head football coach for the University of Charleston from 2022 to 2024. He previously coached for Midwestern State. He played college football for Charleston (WV) as a wide receiver and defensive back.

== Head coaching record ==
Year	Team	Overall	Conference	Standing	Bowl/playoffs	AFCA^{#}	D2^{°}
Charleston Golden Eagles (Mountain East Conference) (2022–2024)
2022	Charleston	6–5	6–4	T–4th			
2023	Charleston	10–2	8–1	1st	L NCAA Division II Second Round	19	18
2024	Charleston	11–1	9–0	1st	L NCAA Division II First Round	15	18
Charleston:		27–8	23–5				
Total:		27–8					
National championship Conference title Conference division title or championship game berth
