= Ray H. Watson =

American football coach (1923–2004)

Biographical details
- Born: July 23, 1923; Olyphant, Pennsylvania
- Died: May 18, 2004 (aged 80); Charleston, West Virginia

Coaching career (HC unless noted)
- 1947–1950: Rupert HS (WV)
- 1954–1956: Wirt County HS (WV)
- 1957–1959: West Virginia Tech
- 1960–1963: West Virginia (assistant)

Head coaching record
- Overall: 16–8–2 (college football)

Ray H. Watson (July 23, 1923 – May 18, 2004) was an American football coach. He served as the head football coach at the West Virginia University Institute of Technology in Montgomery, West Virginia. He held that position for three seasons, from 1957 until 1959. His coaching record at West Virginia Tech was 16–8–2.
