= Cebe Ross =

American football player and coach (1901–1953)

Biographical details
- Born: November 22, 1901; West Virginia, U.S.
- Died: April 2, 1953 (aged 51); Buckhannon, West Virginia, U.S.

Playing career

Football
- 1919–1922: West Virginia Wesleyan
- Positions: Quarterback, halfback

Coaching career (HC unless noted)

Football
- 1924: Buckhannon HS (WV)
- 1925–1941: West Virginia Wesleyan
- 1942: Morris Harvey
- 1946–1950: West Virginia Wesleyan

Basketball
- 1943–1944: Morris Harvey

Head coaching record
- Overall: 95–109–14 (college football); 5–5 (college basketball)

Accomplishments and honors

Championships
- Football; 3 WVAC/WVIAC (1926, 1935, 1942)

Cecil Byron "Cebe" Ross (November 22, 1901 – April 2, 1953) was an American football player and coach. He served as the head football coach at West Virginia Wesleyan College in Buckhannon, West Virginia from 1925 to 1941 and 1946 to 1950. Ross died on April 2, 1953, in Buckhannon, West Virginia.

== Head coaching record ==
=== College football ===
Year	Team	Overall	Conference	Standing	Bowl/playoffs
West Virginia Wesleyan Bobcats (West Virginia Athletic Conference / West Virginia Intercollegiate Athletic Conference) (1925–1941)
1925	West Virginia Wesleyan	5–3	3–1	T–2nd	
1926	West Virginia Wesleyan	4–6	4–1	1st	
1927	West Virginia Wesleyan	3–6–1	3–1	T–3rd	
1928	West Virginia Wesleyan	5–6	3–2	5th	
1929	West Virginia Wesleyan	4–6	4–1	T–4th	
1930	West Virginia Wesleyan	4–5–2	3–0–2	T–2nd	
1931	West Virginia Wesleyan	6–3–1	3–0	NA	
1932	West Virginia Wesleyan	4–4–1	2–1–1	4th	
1933	West Virginia Wesleyan	4–7	2–2	4th	
1934	West Virginia Wesleyan	6–3–1	4–0	2nd	
1935	West Virginia Wesleyan	7–2–1	4–0	1st	
1936	West Virginia Wesleyan	8–2	4–0	T–2nd	
1937	West Virginia Wesleyan	1–7–1	1–2	NA	
1938	West Virginia Wesleyan	3–5	2–1	NA	
1939	West Virginia Wesleyan	1–8	1–3	T–6th	
1940	West Virginia Wesleyan	3–5	3–2	4th	
1941	West Virginia Wesleyan	3–4–1	2–0–1	NA	
Morris Harvey (West Virginia Intercollegiate Athletic Conference) (1942)
1942	Morris Harvey	6–1–2	4–0	1st	
Morris Harvey:		6–1–2	4–0		
West Virginia Wesleyan Bobcats (West Virginia Intercollegiate Athletic Conference) (1946–1950)
1946	West Virginia Wesleyan	6–3	4–3	5th	
1947	West Virginia Wesleyan	6–2	3–2	6th	
1948	West Virginia Wesleyan	4–4–2	3–2–2	6th	
1949	West Virginia Wesleyan	1–9–1	1–6–1	10th	
1950	West Virginia Wesleyan	1–8	1–7	10th	
West Virginia Wesleyan:		89–108–12	60–37–7		
Total:		95–109–14			
National championship Conference title Conference division title or championship game berth
