= Robert Fudge =

American football coach

Biographical details
- Born: February 3, 1901; Covington, Virginia, U.S.
- Died: September 27, 1955 (aged 54); Montgomery, West Virginia, U.S.

Coaching career (HC unless noted)
- 1920: West Virginia Trade

Head coaching record
- Overall: 1–4–1

Robert Andrew Fudge (February 3, 1901 – September 27, 1955) was an American college football coach. He served as the head football coach at West Virginia Trade School—now known as West Virginia University Institute of Technology—in Montgomery, West Virginia, for one season, in 1920, compiling a record of 1–4–1. Fudge died in 1955 after a cerebral hemorrhage.

== Head coaching record ==
Year	Team	Overall	Conference	Standing	Bowl/playoffs
West Virginia Trade (Independent) (1920)
1920	West Virginia Trade	1–4–1			
West Virginia Trade:		1–4–1			
Total:		1–4–1			
