= Waldo S. Tippin =

American football and basketball player, coach, and college athletics administrator

Biographical details
- Born: February 25, 1900
- Died: June 16, 1985 (aged 85) near Clarion, Pennsylvania, U.S.

Playing career
- 1918: Kansas State
- 1919–1921: Geneva
- Position: End

Coaching career (HC unless noted)

Football
- early 1920s: Rochester HS (PA)
- 1925–1931: Meadville HS (PA)
- 1932–1934: Allegheny
- 1935–1947: Clarion
- 1952–1956: Clarion

Basketball
- 1932–1935: Allegheny

Administrative career (AD unless noted)
- 1935–1966: Clarion

Head coaching record
- Overall: 56–63–5 (college football); 12–29 (basketball)

Waldo Samuel "Tip" Tippin (February 25, 1900 – June 16, 1985) was an American football and basketball player, coach, and college athletics administrator. He served as the head football coach at Allegheny College from 1932 to 1934 and at Clarion State College, now Clarion University of Pennsylvania, from 1935 to 1947 and from 1952 to 1956, compiling a career college football record of 56–63–5. Tippin was also the head basketball coach at Allegheny for three seasons, from 1932 to 1935, tallying a mark of 12–29. He served as the athletic director at Clarion from 1935 to 1966. Tippin died at his home near Clarion, Pennsylvania on June 16, 1985.

== Coaching career ==
Tippin was the head football coach at Allegheny College in Meadville, Pennsylvania. He held that position for three seasons, from 1932 until 1934. His coaching record at Allegheny was 3–14–2.

== Head coaching record ==
=== College football ===
Year	Team	Overall	Conference	Standing	Bowl/playoffs
Allegheny Gators (Independent) (1932–1934)
1932	Allegheny	1–5–1			
1933	Allegheny	0–5			
1934	Allegheny	2–4–1			
Allegheny:		3–14–2			
Clarion Golden Eagles (Pennsylvania State Teachers College Conference) (1935–1947)
1935	Clarion	1–6	1–4	11th	
1936	Clarion	0–6	0–4	13th	
1937	Clarion	3–3	2–1	T–5th	
1938	Clarion	5–3	1–2	T–8th	
1939	Clarion	5–1–1	2–0–1	3rd	
1940	Clarion	4–3	2–1	5th	
1941	Clarion	3–2–1	2–1–1	5th	
1942	Clarion	1–3	1–2	T–6th	
1943	No team—World War II				
1944	No team—World War II				
1945	No team—World War II				
1946	Clarion	3–4	2–2	T–5th	
1947	Clarion	2–5	0–4	13th	
Clarion Golden Eagles (Pennsylvania State Teachers College Conference) (1952–1956)
1952	Clarion	9–0	4–0	3rd	
1953	Clarion	6–2	3–1	4th	
1954	Clarion	5–2	3–1	5th	
1955	Clarion	4–3–1	3–1–1	T–4th	
1956	Clarion	2–6	2–3	8th	
Clarion:		53–49–3	28–27–3		
Total:		56–63–5			
