= Shane Beatty =

Canadian gridiron football coach

Current position
- Title: Head coach
- Team: Westshore Rebels
- Conference: CJFL

Playing career
- 1988–1989: Victoria Payless
- Position: Linebacker

Coaching career (HC unless noted)
- 2006–2007: West Virginia Tech
- 2013–2015: Okanagan Sun
- 2016–present: Westshore Rebels (DC)

Head coaching record
- Overall: 2–20 (college)

Shane Beatty is a Canadian gridiron football coach. Beatty served as the head coach of the CJFL's Westshore Rebels from 2015 to 2022 and Okanagan Sun from 2013 to 2015. He served as the head football coach at West Virginia University Institute of Technology in Montgomery, West Virginia from 2006 to 2007, compiling a record of 2-20.

== Head coaching record ==
=== College ===
Year	Team	Overall	Conference	Standing	Bowl/playoffs
West Virginia Tech Golden Bears (Mid-South Conference) (2006–2007)
2006	West Virginia Tech	1–10	1–4	T–5th (East)	
2007	West Virginia Tech	1–10	0–5	6th (East)	
West Virginia Tech:		2–20	1–9		
Total:		2–20			
