= C. R. MacGillivray =

American football coach

Biographical details
- Born: December 21, 1892; Winnipeg, Manitoba, Canada
- Died: April 1963 (aged 70); Michigan, U.S.
- Education: College of Wooster (1917); University of Illinois at Urbana–Champaign; Harvard University; University of Wisconsin

Coaching career (HC unless noted)

Football
- 1923: Franklin HS (PA)
- 1924: Oil City HS (PA) (assistant)
- 1925–1926: Oil City HS (PA)
- 1927: West Virginia Tech
- 1937: Lawrence Tech

Basketball
- 1923–1924: Franklin HS (PA)

Track
- 1923–1924: Franklin HS (PA)

Head coaching record
- Overall: 4–7–1 (college football)

Accomplishments and honors

Championships
- 1 MOCC (1937)

Calvin Ray MacGillivray (December 21, 1892 – April 1963) was an American football, basketball, and track and field coach. He served as the head football coach at New River State School—now known as West Virginia University Institute of Technology—in Montgomery, West Virginia in 1927 and at Lawrence Technological University in Southfield, Michigan in 1937.

== Early life and education ==
McGillivray attended high school in Utah and college in the College of Wooster in Ohio.

== Coaching career ==
MacGillivray began his coaching career at the high school level in Franklin and Oil City, Pennsylvania. He was hired physical director and athletic coach at New River State School—now known as West Virginia University Institute of Technology—in Montgomery, West Virginia in 1927. He served as the head football coach at New River State for one season, in 1927, compiling a record of 0–6.

== Head coaching record ==
=== College football ===
Year	Team	Overall	Conference	Standing	Bowl/playoffs
New River State Golden Bears (West Virginia Athletic Conference) (1927)
1927	New River State	0–6	0–6	11th	
New River State:		0–6	0–6		
Lawrence Tech Blue Devils (Michigan-Ontario Collegiate Conference) (1937)
1937	Lawrence Tech	4–1–1	2–0–1	T–1st	
Lawrence Tech:		4–1–1	2–0–1		
Total:		4–7–1			
National championship Conference title Conference division title or championship game berth
