= Dempsey, Idaho =

Coordinates: 42°37′25″N 111°59′41″W

Dempsey is an extinct town in Bannock County, in the U.S. state of Idaho.

== History ==
A post office called Dempsey was established in 1895, and remained in operation until 1915. The community has the name of Bob Dempsey, an early settler.
