= USS Dempsey =

USS Dempsey has been the name of more than one United States Navy ship, and may refer to:

- USS L. A. Dempsey (SP-1231), a tug and patrol vessel in commission from 1917 to 1919
- USS Dempsey (DE-267), a destroyer escort transferred to the United Kingdom upon completion which served in the Royal Navy as the frigate HMS Cooke (K471) from 1943 to 1946
- USS Dempsey (DE-26), a destroyer escort in commission from 1943 to 1945
