= Marshall L. Shearer =

American football player and coach (1901–1964)

Biographical details
- Born: August 30, 1901; Monticello, Kentucky, U.S.
- Died: May 13, 1964 (aged 62); North Charleston, South Carolina, U.S.

Playing career
- 1923: Centre
- Position: Tackle

Coaching career (HC unless noted)
- 1926: Bluefield
- 1930–1931: Concord
- 1933–1934: New River State

Head coaching record
- Overall: 6–22–3 (college)

Marshall Livingston Shearer Sr. (August 30, 1901 – May 13, 1964) was an American football coach. He served as the head football coach at Bluefield College]—now known as Bluefield University in Bluefield, Virginia in 1926, Concord State Normal School—now known as Concord University—in Athens, West Virginia from 1930 to 1931, and New River State College—now known as West Virginia University Institute of Technology—in Montgomery, West Virginia from 1933 to 1934.

After that, he was a head coach at Graham High School in Bluefield, Virginia where he coached future college and pro football Hall of Fame member Bill Dudley.

Shearer was born in Wayne County, Kentucky in 1901 and died in North Charleston, South Carolina in 1964.

He played college football at Centre College, in Danville, Kentucky, where he a teammate of Red Roberts.

== Head coaching record ==
Year	Team	Overall	Conference	Standing	Bowl/playoffs
Bluefield Rams (Independent) (1926)
1926	Bluefield	1–3–1			
Bluefield:		1–3–1			
Concord Mountain Lions (West Virginia Athletic Conference) (1930–1931)
1930	Concord	1–5–2	0–3–1	10th	
1931	Concord	0–7	0–5	6th	
Concord:		1–12–2	4–3		
New River State Golden Bears (West Virginia Athletic Conference) (1933–1934)
1933	New River State	4–2	1–1	NA	
1934	New River State	0–5	0–4	9th	
New River State:		4–7	1–5		
Total:		6–22–3			
