= Dempsey Wood House =

Historic house in North Carolina, United States

- U.S. National Register of Historic Places
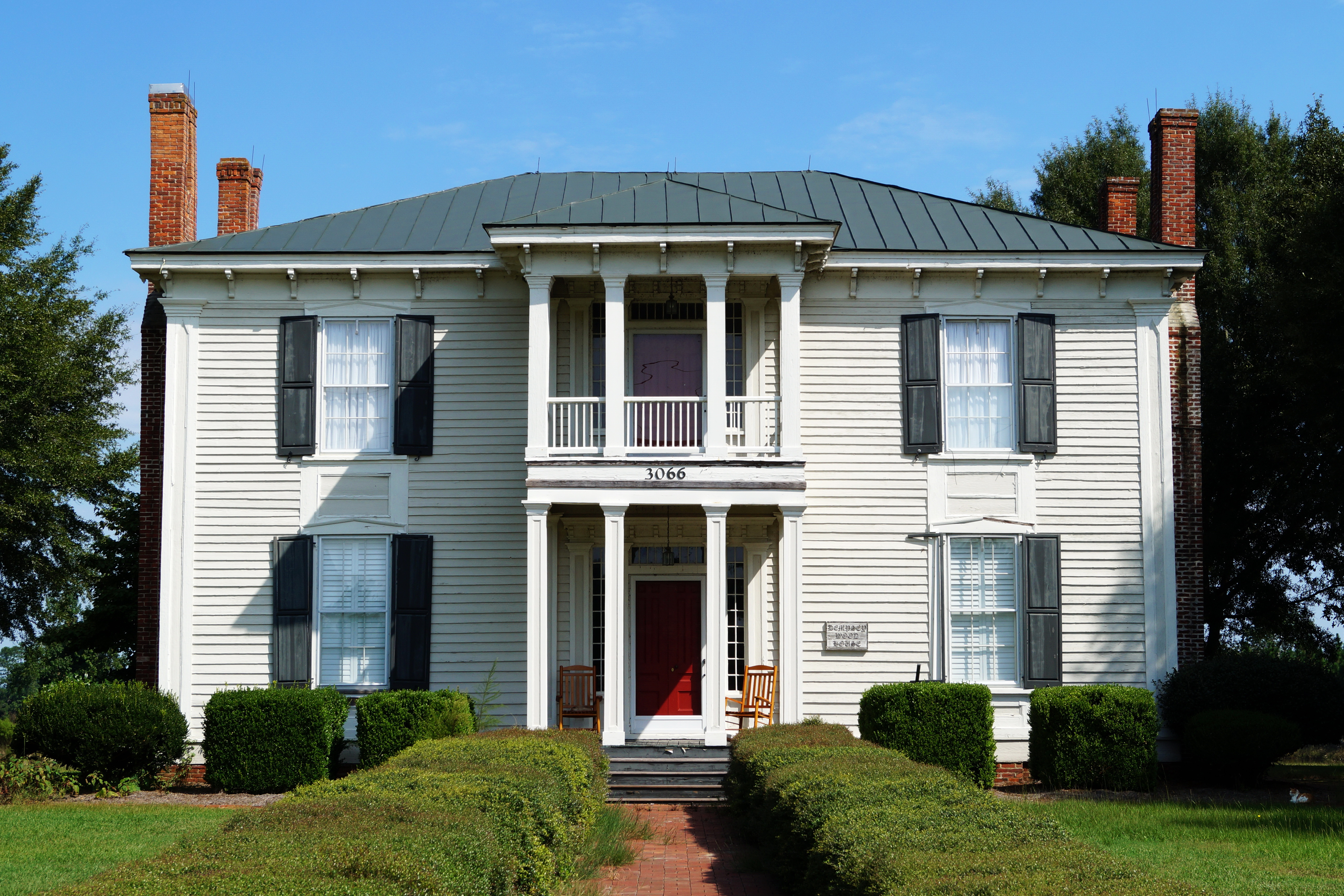
- Dempsey Wood House, 2014

- Location within North Carolina Location within the United States
- Nearest city: Kinston, North Carolina; United States
- Coordinates: 35°13′48.38″N 77°43′25.84″W
- Area: 2.27 acres (0.92 ha)
- Architectural style: Greek Revival, Late Victorian, transitional style
- NRHP reference No.: 71000601
- Added to NRHP: August 26, 1971

The Dempsey Wood House is a historic home located near Kinston, North Carolina, United States. Built in the mid-19th century, the house exemplifies the transition from Greek Revival to Victorian architecture. Interesting architectural details of the home include the two-story porch and eight fireplaces. The Dempsey Wood House was added to the National Register of Historic Places (NRHP) in 1971.

== History ==
James Wood received a plantation from his father in 1836. Records show Wood has begun building a home on the property by 1850, presently located at 3066 Kennedy Home Road (State Route 1324), near the intersection of Louie Pollock Road. Construction was not completed until the Civil War, although the Wood family apparently lived in the house prior to that.

Wood's sons, Dempsey Wood and James Wood, lived in the house until 1892 when the property was divided and sold to N. J. Rouse. Dempsey Wood served in the North Carolina House of Representatives in 1883.

The home was owned by a succession of people before being purchased in 1945 by W. C. Emerson. The Emersons owned the home until at least 1971 when it was the subject of a historical survey. The Dempsey Wood House was added to the NRHP on August 26, 1971.

== Architecture ==
According to the historical survey of the Dempsey Wood House, it is "an important example of the transition from the pure Greek Revival to the more elaborate Victorian eclecticism which was becoming popular just before the Civil War." The home is a two-story wooden frame house on brick piers. The facade is three bays wide and includes a two-tiered porch supported by two square pillars and two paneled pilasters. The second level of the porch features a rounded balustrade. Two pairs of paneled pilasters support a thin entablature above the entrance. Multi-paned sidelights and a narrow transom are on either side of the front door. The east and west sides of the home are four bays wide and feature two pairs of large common bond chimneys. The chimneys are similar in design to ones found in the 17th century and believed to be the only ones of its type in the state. Multi-paned sidelights and a pair of pilasters flank the double door rear entrance. The windows on the front and rear sides of the house, most of which are original, are six-over-six sash while the narrow windows on the east and west sides are four-over-four sash. Molded architraves and triangular pediments are above each window of the house. The interior features a central hall layout plan. The staircase with octagonal handrail is located on the right side of the hallway and is supported by a large newel. The walls are covered with plastering and a vertical wainscot. Architrave and paneled corner blocks frame the interior side of all of the home's doors and windows.

== See also ==
- National Register of Historic Places listings in Lenoir County, North Carolina
