= 1953 Shippensburg Red Raiders football team =

American college football season

1953 Shippensburg Red Raiders football
- Conference: Pennsylvania State Teachers College Conference
- Record: 8–0 (6–0 PSTCC)
- Head coach: Vinton Rambo (7th season)

1953 Pennsylvania State Teachers College Conference football standings
	Conf.					Overall
Team	W		L		T	W		L		T
West Chester $	4	–	0	–	0	7	–	1	–	0
Shippensburg	6	–	0	–	0	8	–	0	–	0
Bloomsburg	3	–	1	–	0	6	–	2	–	0
Clarion	3	–	1	–	0	4	–	3	–	1
Indiana (PA)	3	–	2	–	0	4	–	4	–	0
East Stroudsburg	2	–	2	–	0	3	–	3	–	0
Slippery Rock	1	–	2	–	1	4	–	3	–	1
California (PA)	2	–	3	–	0	3	–	5	–	0
Mansfield	2	–	3	–	0	2	–	5	–	0
Cheyney	1	–	3	–	0	1	–	6	–	0
Lock Haven	4	–	4	–	0	4	–	4	–	0
Edinboro	1	–	3	–	1	3	–	5	–	1
Kutztown	2	–	4	–	0	1	–	5	–	2
Millersville	0	–	6	–	0	0	–	6	–	0
$ – Conference champion; Conference standings were based on the Saylor system of ratings.

The 1953 Shippensburg Red Raiders football team was an American football team that represented Shippensburg State Teachers College (now known as Shippensburg University) in the Pennsylvania State Teachers College Conference (PSTCC) during the 1953 college football season. In their seventh year under head coach Vinton Rambo, the Red Raiders compiled an 8–0 record (6–0 in conference games), shut out five of eight opponents, and outscored all opponents by a total of 299 to 35. Shippensburg finished second in the PSTCC standings behind West Chester, which had a conference record of 4–0 and beat the Red Raiders by 13 rating points.

1953 was Shippensburg's second consecutive perfect season, as the 1952 team went 7–0. Shippensburg had a 20-game winning streak that ran from November 3, 1951, to October 9, 1954.

Guard Robert "Tiny" Adams was selected by the Associated Press as a first-team player on the 1953 Little All-America college football team. Three Shippensburg players were selected by the conference coaches as first-team players on the 1953 All-PSTCC football team: Adams; George Cherry at center; and Spencer Keyes at halfback. Tackle Charles Burnheimer was named to the second team.

The team's assistant coaches were Tom Crist and John Bay. Crist was responsible for the backs, and Bay had responsibility for linebackers and scouting.

== Schedule ==
Date	Opponent	Site	Result	Attendance	Source
September 26	Lock Haven	Shippensburg, PA	W 23–14		
October 3	Wilson Teachers*	Shippensburg, PA	W 28–0		
October 10	East Stroudsburg	Shippensburg, PA	W 30–0		
October 17	at Kutztown	Kutztown, PA	W 61–0		
October 24	at Slippery Rock	Slippery Rock, PA	W 20–14		
October 31	Millersville	Shippensburg, PA	W 65–0		
November 10	at Cheyney	Cheyney, PA	W 20–7		
November 14	at Bridgewater*	Bridgewater, VA	W 52–0		
*Non-conference game
