= Walt Risley =

American coach (1908–1971)

Biographical details
- Born: 1908; Ivyland, Pennsylvania, U.S.
- Died: June 19, 1971 (aged 62–63); Kutztown, Pennsylvania, U.S.

Coaching career (HC unless noted)

Football
- 1946: Kutztown

Basketball
- 1945–1963: Kutztown

Baseball
- 1945–1971: Kutztown

Administrative career (AD unless noted)
- 1945–1971: Kutztown

Head coaching record
- Overall: 3–4 (football); 136–164 (basketball)

Accomplishments and honors

Championships
- Baseball; 1 PSAC (1961)

Awards
- Kutztown Hall of Fame (1991)

Walter P. Risley (1908 – June 19, 1971) was an American football, basketball and baseball coach. He was the head football coach at Kutztown University of Pennsylvania for one season in 1946.

Risley served for head baseball coach from 1945 to 1971 and the head men's basketball coach from 1945 to 1963.

== Head coaching record ==
=== Football ===
Year	Team	Overall	Conference	Standing	Bowl/playoffs
Kutztown Golden Avalanche (Pennsylvania State Teachers College Conference) (1946)
1946	Kutztown	3–4	1–4	14th	
Kutztown:		3–4	1–4		
Total:		3–4			
