= Don L. Phillips =

American football and basketball coach

Biographical details
- Born: Maywood, Illinois, U.S.
- Education: Wheaton College 1941

Coaching career (HC unless noted)

Football
- 1946–1947: Bethany (WV)
- 1948–1950: Shepherd
- 1951–1956: West Virginia Tech

Basketball
- 1949–1951: Shepherd

Head coaching record
- Overall: 42–47–3 (football); 17–24 (basketball)

Don L. Phillips is an American former football and basketball coach. He served as the head football coach at Bethany College in West Virginia (1946–1947), Shepherd College (1948–1950), and West Virginia Institute of Technology (1951–1956), compiling a career college football record of 42–47–3. Phillips was also the head basketball coach at Shepherd from 1949 to 1951, tallying a mark of 17–24.

== Head coaching record ==
=== Football ===
| Year | Team | Overall | Conference | Standing | Bowl/playoffs |
|---|---|---|---|---|---|
Bethany Bison (West Virginia Intercollegiate Athletic Conference) (1946–1947)
| 1946 | Bethany | 1–7 | 0–2 | NA | |
| 1947 | Bethany | 0–8 | 0–2 | NA | |
| Bethany: | | 1–15 | 0–4 | | |
Shepherd Rams (West Virginia Intercollegiate Athletic Conference) (1948–1950)
| 1948 | Shepherd | 3–3–1 | 2–3–1 | 8th | |
| 1949 | Shepherd | 6–2 | 4–2 | T–4th | |
| 1950 | Shepherd | 4–4–1 | 3–2–1 | T–4th | |
| Shepherd: | | 13–9–2 | 9–7–2 | | |
West Virginia Tech Golden Bears (West Virginia Intercollegiate Athletic Conference) (1951–1956)
| 1951 | West Virginia Tech | 7–1 | 5–1 | 2nd | |
| 1952 | West Virginia Tech | 6–3 | 3–1 | 3rd | |
| 1953 | West Virginia Tech | 1–7 | 1–3 | 7th | |
| 1954 | West Virginia Tech | 5–4 | 3–2 | 3rd | |
| 1955 | West Virginia Tech | 5–3–1 | 3–2 | 3rd | |
| 1956 | West Virginia Tech | 4–5 | 1–3 | T–6th | |
| West Virginia Tech: | | 28–23–1 | 16–12 | | |
| Total: | | 42–47–3 | | | |
