= Mike Springston =

American football coach (born 1956)

Biographical details
- Born: December 24, 1956 (age 69)

Coaching career (HC unless noted)
- 1979–1981: West Virginia Tech (QB)
- 1982–1983: West Virginia State (OL)
- 1984: Linden-McKinley HS (OH) (OA)
- 1985–1986: Linden-McKinley HS (OH)
- 1990: West Virginia Tech (OC)
- 1991: Glenville State Pioneers (OC)
- 1992: Concord (OC)
- 1993: Homewood-Flossmoor HS (IL) (OA)
- 1994–1995: Thornridge HS (IL)
- 1996–1997: Homewood-Flossmoor HS (IL) (OC)
- 1999–2002: West Virginia Tech
- 2003–2004: Charleston (WV)
- 2005: Parkland HS (NC) (OA)
- 2007: Parkland HS (NC) (OC)
- 2008–2010: Eastern Kentucky (OC)
- 2011–2014: Walkertown HS (NC)

Administrative career (AD unless noted)
- 1999–2002: West Virginia Tech

Head coaching record
- Overall: 22–43 (college)

Mike Springston (born December 24, 1956) is an American former football coach and college athletics administrator. He served as the head football coach at West Virginia University Institute of Technology in Beckley, West Virginia from 1999 to 2002 and the University of Charleston in Charleston, West Virginia from 2003 to 2004. Springston was also the athletic director at West Virginia Tech from 1999 to 2002.

== Head coaching record ==
=== College ===
Year	Team	Overall	Conference	Standing	Bowl/playoffs
West Virginia Tech Golden Bears (West Virginia Intercollegiate Athletic Conference) (1999–2002)
1999	West Virginia Tech	1–10	1–5	T–6th	
2000	West Virginia Tech	5–6	3–4	T–4th	
2001	West Virginia Tech	5–6	4–3	4th	
2002	West Virginia Tech	6–5	5–2	T–2nd	
West Virginia Tech:		17–27	13–14		
Charleston Golden Eagles (NCAA Division II independent) (2003–2004)
2003	Charleston	2–9			
2004	Charleston	3–7			
Charleston:		5–16			
Total:		22–43			
