= Glenn Killinger =

American athlete and coach (1898–1988)

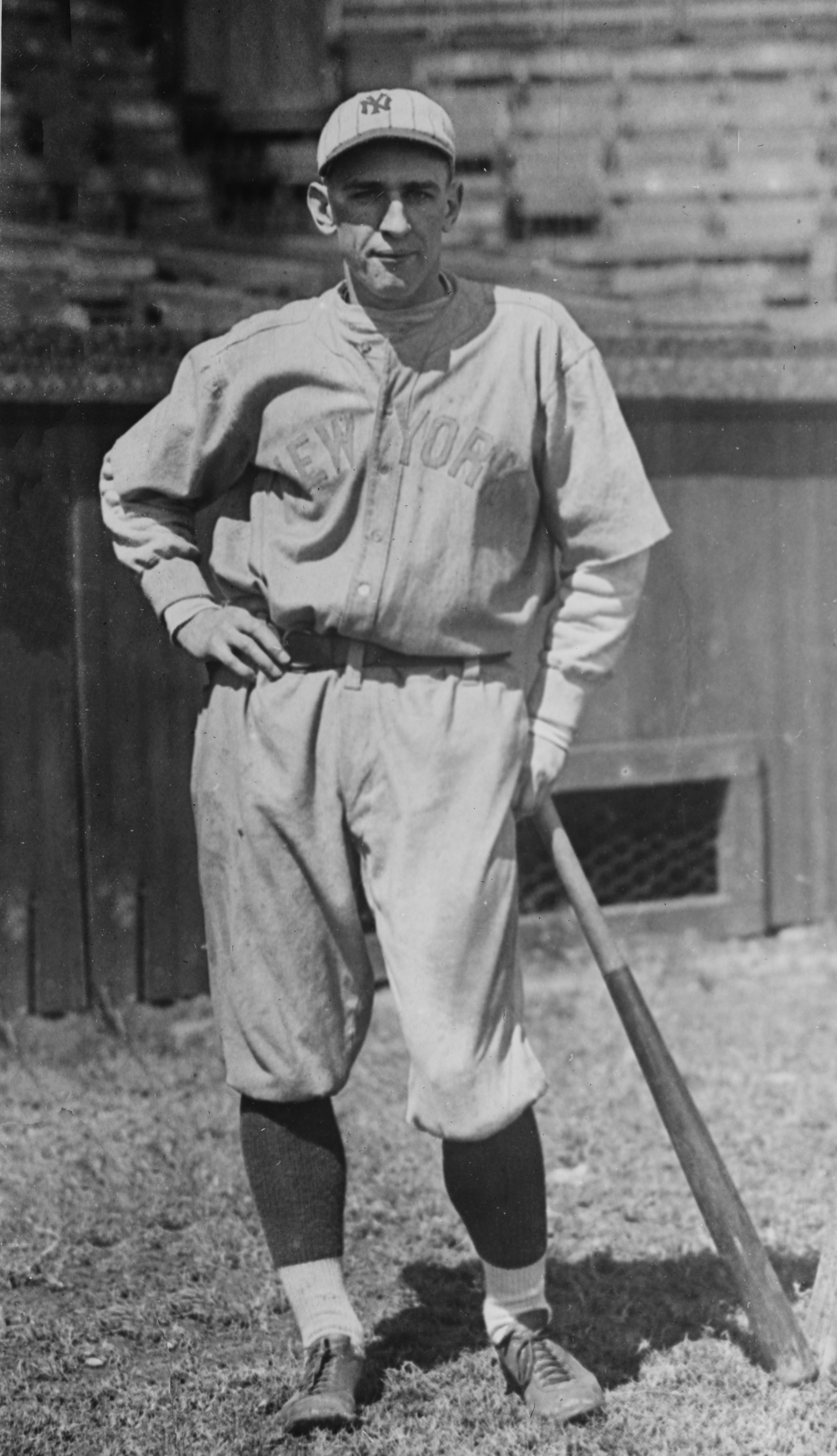
- Killinger in 1922

Biographical details
- Born: September 13, 1898; Harrisburg, Pennsylvania, U.S.
- Died: July 25, 1988 (aged 89); Stanton, Delaware, U.S.

Playing career

Football
- 1918–1921: Penn State
- 1921: Canton Bulldogs
- 1926: New York Giants
- 1926: Philadelphia Quakers

Basketball
- 1919–1921: Penn State

Baseball
- 1919–1921: Penn State
- 1922: Jersey City Skeeters
- 1923: Atlanta Crackers
- 1924: Harrisburg Senators
- 1926: Shamokin Indians
- 1927–1928: Harrisburg Senators
- 1929–1932: Williamsport Grays
- Positions: Quarterback, halfback (football)

Coaching career (HC unless noted)

Football
- 1922: Dickinson
- 1923–1926: Penn State (assistant)
- 1927–1931: RPI
- 1933: Moravian
- 1934–1941: West Chester
- 1944: North Carolina Pre-Flight
- 1945–1959: West Chester

Basketball
- 1935–1940: West Chester
- 1945–1946: West Chester

Baseball
- 1924: Harrisburg Senators
- 1926: Shamokin Indians
- 1930: Williamsport Grays
- 1932: Wilkes-Barre Barons
- 1932: Allentown Buffaloes
- 1967–1970: West Chester

Head coaching record
- Overall: 176–72–16 (college football); 66–40 (college basketball); 59–29–2 (college baseball)
- Bowls: 3–1

Accomplishments and honors

Championships
- Football; 7 PSTCC (1941, 1950, 1952–1954, 1956, 1959)

Awards
- Football; Consensus All-American (1921)
- College Football Hall of Fame; Inducted in 1971 (profile)

William Glenn Killinger (September 13, 1898 – July 25, 1988) was an American football, basketball, and baseball player, coach, and college athletics administrator from Harrisburg, Pennsylvania. He graduated Harrisburg Technical High School and then lettered in three sports at Pennsylvania State University, where he was an All-American in football in 1921. Killinger then played in the National Football League (NFL) for the Canton Bulldogs and the New York Giants and for Philadelphia Quakers of the first American Football League in 1926. Killinger served as the head football coach at Dickinson College (1922), Rensselaer Polytechnic Institute (1927–1931), Moravian College (1933), West Chester University (1934–1941, 1945–1959), and with the North Carolina Pre-Flight School (1944), compiling a career college football head coaching record of 176–72–16. He was inducted to the College Football Hall of Fame as a player in 1971.

Killinger was also a minor league baseball player from 1922 until 1932. During that time, he played for the Jersey City Skeeters (1922), Atlanta Crackers (1923), Harrisburg Senators (1924, 1927–1928), Shamokin Indians (1926) and the Williamsport Grays (1929–1932). He served as a manager for the Indians and the Senators, managing the latter to the Eastern League pennant in 1928.

== Head coaching record ==
=== College football ===
Year	Team	Overall	Conference	Standing	Bowl/playoffs	UPI^{#}
Dickinson Red and White (Independent) (1922)
1922	Dickinson	6–3				
Dickinson:		6–3				
RPI Engineers (Independent) (1927–1931)
1927	RPI	1–7				
1928	RPI	4–3–1				
1929	RPI	3–5				
1930	RPI	4–2–2				
1931	RPI	2–7				
RPI:		14–24–3				
Moravian Greyhounds (Independent) (1933)
1933	Moravian	3–2				
Moravian:		3–2				
West Chester Golden Rams (Pennsylvania State Teachers Conference / Pennsylvania State Teachers College Conference) (1934–1941)
1934	West Chester	4–4	2–0	2nd		
1935	West Chester	7–3	1–0	2nd		
1936	West Chester	4–4–1	1–1	T–6th		
1937	West Chester	6–3–1	2–1	T–5th		
1938	West Chester	4–2–3	1–0–2	3rd		
1939	West Chester	3–3–3	3–0	2nd		
1940	West Chester	5–2–1	2–0	3rd		
1941	West Chester	5–1–2	3–0	T–1st		
North Carolina Pre-Flight Cloudbusters (Independent) (1944)
1944	North Carolina Pre-Flight	6–2–1				
North Carolina Pre-Flight:		6–2–1				
West Chester Golden Rams (Independent) (1945)
1945	West Chester	3–0–1				
West Chester Golden Rams (Pennsylvania State Teachers College Conference) (1946–1959)
1946	West Chester	9–1	2–1	T–3rd		
1947	West Chester	10–1	3–0	1st (Note: West Chester finished the 1947 season tied with Slippery Rock for the best record in the conference, but neither team was eligible for the conference title as neither has played the required four conference games. Mansfield won the conference title.)	W Burley, L Cigar	
1948	West Chester	7–1	3–0	3rd	W Burley	
1949	West Chester	8–1	3–0	3rd		
1950	West Chester	7–2	4–0	1st		
1951	West Chester	8–2	3–1	4th	W Pretzel Bowl	
1952	West Chester	7–0	5–0	1st		
1953	West Chester	7–1	4–0	1st		
1954	West Chester	5–4	3–1	T–1st		
1955	West Chester	6–3	3–1	2nd		
1956	West Chester	7–1	4–0	1st		
1957	West Chester	9–0	4–0	3rd		
1958	West Chester	9–1	6–0	2nd		T–16
1959	West Chester	7–1	5–1	1st		10
West Chester:		147–41–11	67–7–2			
Total:		176–72–16				
National championship Conference title Conference division title or championship game berth
^{#}Rankings from final UPI small college poll.
