= Squibb Wilson =

American sports coach, politician (1913–1986)

Biographical details
- Born: October 6, 1913; Fairview, West Virginia, U.S.
- Died: 1986

Coaching career (HC unless noted)

Football
- 1940–1942: Fairmont State
- 1946–1951: Fairmont State

Basketball
- 1941–1950: Fairmont State

Administrative career (AD unless noted)
- 1952–1977: Fairmont State

Head coaching record
- Overall: 35–31–5 (football); 139–85 (basketball); 351–194–6 (baseball)

Accomplishments and honors

Championships
- Basketball; 2 WVIAC Baseball; 10 WVIAC

Awards
- Eastern US Baseball Coach of the Year (1967); West Virginia Sportswriters Hall of Fame (1987)

Wilford Russell "Squibb" Wilson (October 6, 1913 – 1986) was an American football, basketball, and baseball coach and athletic director at Fairmont State University.

He also served as member of West Virginia House of Delegates from Marion County during three separate terms (1957–58, 1961–64, 1967–68).

== Head coaching record ==
=== Football ===
| Year | Team | Overall | Conference | Standing | Bowl/playoffs |
|---|---|---|---|---|---|
Fairmont State Fighting Falcons (West Virginia Intercollegiate Athletic Conference) (1940–1942)
| 1940 | Fairmont State | 3–4–1 | 2–4–1 | T–6th | |
| 1941 | Fairmont State | 5–2 | 4–2 | 3rd | |
| 1942 | Fairmont State | 3–4 | 3–4 | 4th | |
Fairmont State Fighting Falcons (West Virginia Intercollegiate Athletic Conference) (1946–1951)
| 1946 | Fairmont State | 4–3–1 | 3–1–1 | 4th | |
| 1947 | Fairmont State | 4–3–1 | 4–1 | 3rd | |
| 1948 | Fairmont State | 3–4–1 | 3–3–1 | 7th | |
| 1949 | Fairmont State | 3–4–1 | 2–4–1 | 7th | |
| 1950 | Fairmont State | 4–4 | 4–3 | 6th | |
| 1951 | Fairmont State | 6–3 | 4–2 | 4th | |
| Fairmont State: | | 35–31–5 | 29–24–4 | | |
| Total: | | 35–31–5 | | | |
