= Homer C. Martin =

American athlete and sports coach (1898–1950)

Biographical details
- Born: June 22, 1898; Clay County, West Virginia, U.S.
- Died: July 17, 1950 (aged 52); Gallipolis, Ohio, U.S.

Playing career

Football
- 1919–1922: West Virginia

Basketball
- 1919–1921: West Virginia

Baseball
- 1919–1922: West Virginia
- Position: Fullback (football)

Coaching career (HC unless noted)

Football
- 1923–1926: New River State
- 1927–1929: West Virginia
- c. 1930–1935: Point Pleasant HS (WV)
- 1936: Morris Harvey

Basketball
- c. 1930–1936: Point Pleasant HS (WV)
- 1936–1937: Morris Harvey

Administrative career (AD unless noted)
- c. 1930–1936: Point Pleasant HS (WV)

Head coaching record
- Overall: 15–20–5 (college football); 8–12 (college basketball)

Homer Chester "Moose" Martin (June 22, 1898 – July 17, 1950) was an American college sports athletes and coach. He played football, basketball, and baseball at West Virginia University. Martin was the head football coach at the New River State School—now known as West Virginia University Institute of Technology—in Montgomery, West Virginia for four seasons, from 1923 until 1926, compiling a record of 15–9–5.

Martin was born on June 22, 1898, at Porter's Creek in Clay County, West Virginia. He attended Charleston High School in Charleston, West Virginia. Martin won letter fours at West Virginia in football and three times in both basketball and baseball. He suffered a stroke on July 5, 1950, at his home in Point Pleasant, West Virginia. He died 12 days later, on July 17, at Holzer Hospital in Gallipolis, Ohio.

== Head coaching record ==
=== College football ===
Year	Team	Overall	Conference	Standing	Bowl/playoffs
New River State Golden Bears (Independent) (1923–1924)
1923	New River State	4–3–1			
1924	New River State	4–2–2			
New River State Golden Bears (West Virginia Athletic Conference) (1925–1926)
1925	New River State	5–1–2	3–1–1	T–2nd	
1926	New River State	2–3	1–3	9th	
New River State:		15–9–5	0–4		
Morris Harvey Golden Eagles (West Virginia Athletic Conference) (1936)
1936	Morris Harvey	0–11	0–8	9th	
Morris Harvey:		0–11	0–8		
Total:		15–20–5			
