= Eddie Gulian =

American football, basketball and baseball coach

Biographical details
- Born: June 18, 1906
- Died: November 10, 1991 (aged 85)

Playing career

Football
- c. 1930: Gettysburg

Baseball
- 1931–1933: Harrisburg Senators
- 1934: Hazleton Mountaineers
- 1936: Jacksonville Tars
- 1936: Columbia Senators
- Positions: End (football); Second baseman (baseball)

Coaching career (HC unless noted)

Football
- 1933–1946: Shippensburg
- 1947–1948: Lafayette (backfield)
- 1949–1954: Albright

Basketball
- 1933–1943: Shippensburg
- 1949–1955: Albright

Baseball
- c. 1950: Albright

Administrative career (AD unless noted)
- 1933–?: Shippensburg

Head coaching record
- Overall: 72–58–8 (football); 139–151 (basketball)

Accomplishments and honors

Championships
- Football; 1 PSTCC (1935)

Edward Gulian (June 18, 1906 – November 10, 1991) was an American football, basketball, and baseball player and coach, and college athletics administrator. He served as the head football coach at State Teachers College at Shippensburg—now known as Shippensburg University of Pennsylvania—from 1933 to 1946 and at Albright College from 1949 to 1954, compiling a career college football coaching record of 72–57–9. He was also the head basketball coach at Shippensburg from 1933 to 1943 and at Albright from 1949 to 1955, tallying a career college basketball coaching record of 139–151. Gulian attended Norristown High School in Norristown, Pennsylvania and Gettysburg College. He was named he athletic director at Shippensburg in 1933. Gulian served as an assistant football coach in charge of the backfield at Lafayette College for two seasons before being hired at Albright in 1949.

Gulian served in the United States Navy as a commander during World War II. He later taught physical education at Modesto Junior College in Modesto, California. He remained in Modesto during his retirement, until his death on November 10, 1991.

== Head coaching record ==
=== Football ===
Year	Team	Overall	Conference	Standing	Bowl/playoffs
Shippensburg Red and Blue (Independent) (1933)
1933	Shippensburg	1–6			
Shippensburg Red and Blue / Red Raiders (Pennsylvania State Teachers College Conference) (1934–1946)
1934	Shippensburg	5–2	5–2	3rd	
1935	Shippensburg	7–1	6–1	1st	
1936	Shippensburg	7–1	6–1	2nd	
1937	Shippensburg	5–1–2	3–1–2	4th	
1938	Shippensburg	6–1–1	5–1–1	4th	
1939	Shippensburg	3–3–1	3–3–1	8th	
1940	Shippensburg	3–3–2	2–3–2	8th	
1941	Shippensburg	6–2	6–1	3rd	
1942	Shippensburg	2–4	1–4	9th	
1943	No team—World War II				
1944	No team—World War II				
1945	No team—World War II				
1946	Shippensburg	2–5–1	2–5–1	11th	
Shippensburg:		47–29–7	39–22–7		
Albright Lions (Middle Atlantic Conferences) (1949–1954)
1949	Albright	2–6–1			
1950	Albright	5–4			
1951	Albright	6–4			
1952	Albright	6–3			
1953	Albright	3–6			
1954	Albright	3–6			
Albright:		25–29–1			
Total:		72–58–8			
