= Charleston Golden Eagles football =

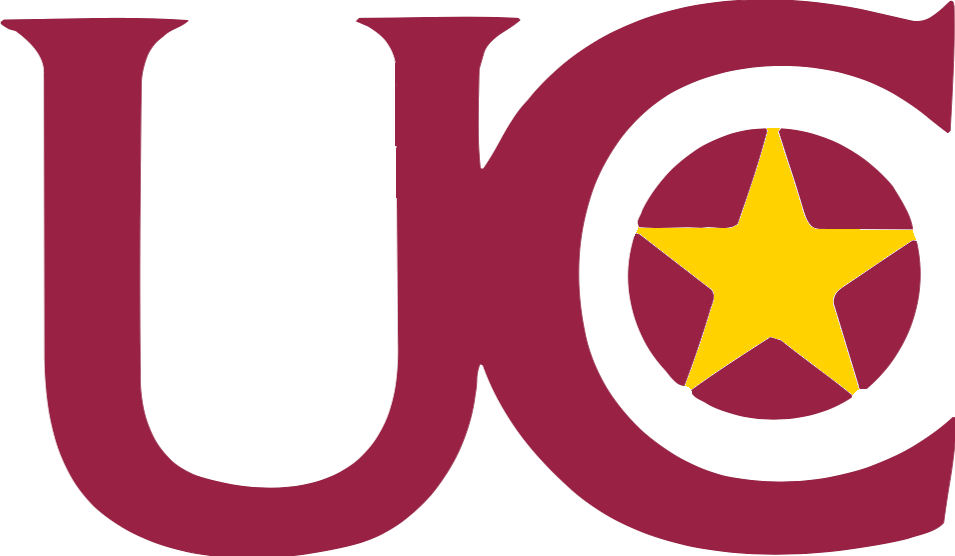
- First season: 1904; 122 years ago
- Athletic director: Dr. Bren Stevens
- Head coach: Mike Tesch; 2nd season, 8–3 (.727)
- Location: Charleston, West Virginia
- Stadium: UC Stadium at Laidley Field (capacity: 18,500)
- NCAA division: Division II
- Conference: Mountain East
- Colors: Maroon and gold
- All-time record: 305–280–19 (.521)
- Playoff record: 1–3 (.250)
- Bowl record: 3–1 (.750)

National championships
- Unclaimed: 1950

Conference championships
- WVIAC: 1938, 1941, 1942, 1948, 1950, 1951, 1953, 1954 MEC: 2023, 2024, 2025, 2026

Division championships
- MEC South: 2020
- Consensus All-Americans: 1
- Rivalries: Concord; Glenville State; West Virginia State; WVU Tech (defunct)
- Mascot: MoHarv
- Marching band: University of Charleston Band
- Outfitter: Nike
- Website: ucgoldeneagles.com

The Charleston Golden Eagles football program represents the University of Charleston in college football at the NCAA Division II level as a member of the Mountain East Conference (MEC). The Golden Eagles play their home games at University of Charleston Stadium at Laidley Field in Charleston, West Virginia.

== History ==
The University of Charleston first fielded a football team in 1904, when the school was known as Morris Harvey College. The program competed as an independent before joining the West Virginia Intercollegiate Athletic Conference (WVIAC) in 1924.

The 1950 team finished undefeated at 10–0 and defeated Emory and Henry 35–14 in the 1951 Tangerine Bowl. Under head coach Eddie King, the Golden Eagles won five WVIAC championships between 1948 and 1954, including an extended conference winning streak that began after a loss to West Virginia Tech in 1949 and continued without another conference defeat through the end of the 1956 season. The university discontinued the football program following the 1956 season.

The 1950 Golden Eagles are recognized by the university as the “Unofficial Small College National Champions,” the only team in school history to receive a national designation.

On November 19, 2002, the university announced that after a 47-year hiatus, football would be reinstated for the 2003 season, with the school rejoining the WVIAC and competing at the NCAA Division II level. Charleston played its first football game since 1956 against rival West Virginia Tech at Laidley Field, falling 17–21. Following the dissolution of the WVIAC in 2012, Charleston became a charter member of the newly formed Mountain East Conference (MEC) in 2013.

Under head coach Pat Kirkland, who took over in 2011, the Golden Eagles recorded a breakout season in 2015, finishing 10–2 and earning the program's first berth in the NCAA Division II Football Championship, placing No. 20 in the final national poll. Kirkland led the program to six MEC runner-up finishes before departing for Jacksonville State following the 2021 season. Former UC player and assistant coach Quinn Sanders was hired in 2022.

The 2023 team finished 10–2, reached No. 19 in the national rankings, and captured the university's first MEC championship, securing its first NCAA postseason appearance since 2015. Charleston defeated New Haven in the first round before falling to Kutztown. The 2024 squad completed an undefeated regular season, climbed as high as No. 6 nationally, and averaged 43.9 points per game. Junior running back Chavon Wright rushed for 2,235 yards and an NCAA Division II-record 38 rushing touchdowns, finishing as the runner-up for the Harlon Hill Trophy. The team finished No. 15 following a first-round playoff loss to Ashland.

Following the 2024 season, head coach Quinn Sanders stepped down to become the offensive coordinator at Northern Illinois. Michael Tesch was named head coach for the 2025 campaign. The Golden Eagles entered the year ranked No. 14 nationally and finished 8–3, earning a share of the MEC title.

== Conference affiliations ==
- Independent (1904–1923)
- West Virginia Intercollegiate Athletic Conference (1924–1956)
  - Football program discontinued after 1956 and reinstated for 2003
- Independent (2003–2004)
- West Virginia Intercollegiate Athletic Conference (2005–2012)
- Mountain East Conference (2013–present)

== Head coaches ==
Since its inception in 1904, Charleston has had 21 head coaches.

Years	Coach	Record	Pct.	Seasons
1904–1907	Walter Ropp	5–5	.500	4
1910–1913	Skeeter Shelton	8–10–3	.452	4
1917, 1921–1923	Herman R. Beckelheimer	12–19–2	.394	4
1919	William W. Lovell	1–5	.167	1
1920, 1926–1928	Elbert M. Fulton	13–21–1	.386	4
1924–1925	Heyward J. Hindman	1–10	.091	2
1929	Arthur Rezzonico	0–11	.000	1
1930	Frank Arritt	2–5–2	.333	1
1931	Gibby Welch	5–5	.500	1
1932–1933	Red Weaver	1–17	.056	2
1933–1935	Walter Walker	5–12–1	.306	3
1936	Homer C. Martin	0–9	.000	1
1937–1941	Thurman Ward	28–14–4	.652	5
1942	Cebe Ross	6–1–2	.778	1
1946	Alderson Propps	0–2	.000	1
1946–1956	Eddie King	63–33–4	.650	11
2003–2004	Mike Springston	5–16	.238	2
2005–2010	Tony DeMeo	43–23	.652	6
2011–2021	Pat Kirkland	70–41	.631	11
2022–2024	Quinn Sanders	27–8	.771	3
2025–present	Mike Tesch	8–3	.727	1

== Championships ==
=== Conference ===
Throughout the history of the University of Charleston football program, the Golden Eagles have secured 11 conference championships, spanning multiple coaching eras and conference affiliations.

Year	Conference	Coach	Record	Conference record
1938	WVIAC	Thurman Ward	8–1–1	7–0–1
1941†	WVIAC	Thurman Ward	5–3–1	3–0–1
1942	WVIAC	Cebe Ross	6–1–2	4–0
1948	WVIAC	Eddie King	5–2–2	3–0–1
1950	WVIAC	Eddie King	10–0	5–0
1951	WVIAC	Eddie King	6–3–1	4–0
1953	WVIAC	Eddie King	6–4–1	4–0
1954	WVIAC	Eddie King	8–2	4–0
2023	MEC	Quinn Sanders	10–2	8–1
2024	MEC	Quinn Sanders	11–1	9–0
2025†	MEC	Michael Tesch	8–3	7–1
† Co-champions

=== Division ===
For the 2020 season, the Mountain East Conference temporarily adopted a divisional format.

Year	Division	Head coach	Opponent	CG Result
2020	MEC South	Pat Kirkland	Notre Dame (OH)	L, 34–51

== Undefeated seasons ==
The 1950 Golden Eagles remain the only squad in school history to complete an undefeated season, finishing 10–0 and capping the year with a 35–14 victory over Emory and Henry in the 1951 Tangerine Bowl.

Year	Overall Record	Conf. Record	Head coach
1950	10–0	5–0	Eddie King

== Postseason ==
=== NCAA Division II playoffs ===
The Golden Eagles have made four appearances in the NCAA Division II playoffs with a combined record of 1–3.

Year	Round	Opponent	Result
2015	First Round	IUP	L, 21–47
2023	First Round; Second Round	New Haven; Kutztown	W, 52–44; L, 31–32
2024	First Round	Ashland	L, 38–40
2026	First Round	Slippery Rock	TBP

=== Bowl games ===
The Golden Eagles appeared in four bowl games between 1951 and 1954, finishing with a 3–1 record.

Date	Bowl	W/L	Opponent	PF	PA
January 1, 1951	Tangerine Bowl	W	Emory and Henry	35	14
November 22, 1951	Burley Bowl	W	Lebanon Valley	27	20
January 2, 1954	Elks Bowl	W	East Carolina	12	0
December 17, 1954	Cigar Bowl	L	Tampa	0	21
Total	4 bowl games	3–1		74	55

== National rankings ==
As of the end of the 2025 season, Charleston has ended the season ranked five times in either the AFCA poll or D2Football.com rankings.

Year	Record	AFCA	D2†
2009	9–2	23	—
2012	9–2	25	—
2015	10–2	20	—
2023	10–2	19	18
2024	11–1	15	18

† D2football.com rankings began in 2019.

== Individual awards and achievements ==
The Charleston Golden Eagles football program has produced numerous standout players and coaches throughout its history.

=== National awards ===
==== List of All-Americans ====
Since 1939, twenty-four Charleston players have earned All-America honors through the 2024 season. One was a consensus First Team honoree, indicated in bold.

- 1939: Al Thacker (G)
- 1941: Al Thacker (G)
- 1950: Leon McCoy (C), Dewey Romine (HB), Charley Hubbard (End)
- 1954: Fauster Vittone
- 2006: Blake Burr (HB)
- 2009: Chris Almonte (DE)
- 2011: Jordan Roberts (RB)
- 2012: Jordan Roberts (RB)
- 2014: Justin Avery (LB), Torie Wagner (CB)
- 2015: Brett Benes (P), Torie Wagner (CB), Justin Johnson (G)
- 2016: Brett Benes (P), Justin Johnson (G)
- 2017: Jalen Nelson (DL)
- 2018: John Cominsky (DE), Kahzin Daniels (DE)
- 2019: Mike Strachan (WR), Kei Beckham (CB)
- 2021: Tyreik McAllister (RB)
- 2022: Ninon Washington (CB), Chavon Wright (RB)
- 2023: Chavon Wright (RB), Donovan McCollister (G), Nick Evans (DL), Javonte Howard (QB)
- 2024: Donovan McCollister (G), **Chavon Wright** (RB), Cashawn Beasley (S)

==== Harlon Hill Trophy ====
- 2024: Chavon Wright – 2nd place

=== Conference awards ===
At the conclusion of the 2025 season, Charleston players have earned eight Offensive or Defensive Player of the Year awards, achieved by seven different athletes. One player has received Freshman of the Year honors, and Charleston coaches have earned five Coach of the Year awards.

==== Offensive Player of the Year ====
- 2012: Jordan Roberts (RB)
- 2021: Tyreik McAllister (RB)
- 2023: Chavon Wright (RB)
- 2024: Chavon Wright (RB)

==== Defensive Player of the Year ====
- 2014: Justin Avery (LB)
- 2018: John Cominsky (DE)
- 2023: Nick Evans (DL)
- 2025: Aden Miller (LB)

==== Offensive Freshman of the Year ====
- 2022: Chavon Wright (RB)

==== Coach of the Year ====
- 1954: Eddie King
- 2005: Tony DeMeo (D2Football.com)
- 2012: Pat Kirkland
- 2023: Quinn Sanders
- 2024: Quinn Sanders

=== Regional awards ===
Charleston competes in NCAA Division II Region 1.

==== D2CCA Region 1 Offensive Player of the Year ====
- 2024: Chavon Wright (RB)

==== Hardman Award ====
- 2024: Chavon Wright (RB)

All records per UC Athletics

== Year-by-year results ==
Legend

^{†} Conference champions
^{‡} Division champions
Bowl game berth
Playoff berth (NCAA DII)

List of Charleston Golden Eagles football seasons
Season	Team	Head coach	Conference	Division	Regular season results							Postseason
Season	Team	Head coach	Conference	Division	Overall			Conference				Postseason
Season	Team	Head coach	Conference	Division	Win	Loss	Tie	Win	Loss	Tie	Finish	Postseason
Morris Harvey Golden Eagles (1904–1956)
1904	1904	Walter Ropp	Independent	—	3	0		—	—	—	—	—
1905	1905	Walter Ropp	Independent	—	0	1		—	—	—	—	—
1906	1906	Walter Ropp	Independent	—	0	1		—	—	—	—	—
1907	1907	Walter Ropp	Independent	—	2	3		—	—	—	—	—
1908	1908	No Coach	Independent	—	3	0		—	—	—	—	—
1909	1909	No Coach	Independent	—	0	3		—	—	—	—	—
1910	1910	Skeeter Shelton	Independent	—	0	2	1	—	—	—	—	—
1911	1911	Skeeter Shelton	Independent	—	4	3		—	—	—	—	—
1912	1912	Skeeter Shelton	Independent	—	2	2		—	—	—	—	—
1913	1913	Skeeter Shelton	Independent	—	2	3	2	—	—	—	—	—
1914	1914	Unknown	Independent	—	0	4		—	—	—	—	—
1915	No team											
1916	1916	Unknown	Independent	—	0	2	0	—	—	—	—	—
1917	1917	Herman R. Beckelheimer	Independent	—	2	4	1	—	—	—	—	—
1918	No team											
1919	1919	William W. Lovell	Independent	—	1	5		—	—	—	—	—
1920	1920	Elbert M. Fulton	Independent	—	5	2		—	—	—	—	—
1921	1921	Herman R. Beckelheimer	Independent	—	6	3		—	—	—	—	—
1922	1922	Herman R. Beckelheimer	Independent	—	4	4	1	—	—	—	—	—
1923	1923	Herman R. Beckelheimer	Independent	—	0	8		—	—	—	—	—
1924	1924	Heyward J. Hindman	WVIAC	—	0	4						—
1925	1925	Heyward J. Hindman	WVIAC	—	1	6		0	3		DNQ	—
1926	1926	Elbert M. Fulton	WVIAC	—	3	6		0	3		DNQ	—
1927	1927	Elbert M. Fulton	WVIAC	—	3	4	1	1	2		DNQ	—
1928	1928	Elbert M. Fulton	WVIAC	—	2	9		1	6		11th	—
1929	1929	Arthur Rezzonico	WVIAC	—	0	11		0	8		14th	—
1930	1930	Frank Arritt	WVIAC	—	2	5	2	1	3	2	8th	—
1931	1931	Gibby Welch	WVIAC	—	5	5		4	5		3rd	—
1932	1932	Red Weaver	WVIAC	—	0	9		0	4		7th	—
1933	1933	Red Weaver	WVIAC	—	1	8		0	5		7th	—
1934	1934	Walter Walker	WVIAC	—	3	5	1	3	2	1	3rd	—
1935	1935	Walter Walker	WVIAC	—	2	7		2	4		4th	
1936	1936	Homer C. Martin	WVIAC	—	0	9		0	7		9th	
1937	1937	Thurman Ward	WVIAC	—	5	4		3	4		4th	
1938	1938 ^{†}	Thurman Ward	WVIAC	—	8	1	1	7	0	1	1st	
1939	1939	Thurman Ward	WVIAC	—	5	3	1	2	2	1	4th	
1940	1940	Thurman Ward	WVIAC	—	5	3	1	4	1	1	3rd	
1941	1941 ^{†}	Thurman Ward	WVIAC	—	5	3	1	3	0	1	T-1st	
1942	1942 ^{†}	Cebe Ross	WVIAC	—	6	1	2	4	0		1st	
1943	No team — World War II											
1944	No team — World War II											
1945	No team — World War II											
1946	1946	Alderson Propps / Eddie King	WVIAC	—	2	5		2	3		7th	
1947	1947	Eddie King	WVIAC	—	4	5		3	3		7th	
1948	1948 ^{†}	Eddie King	WVIAC	—	5	2	2	3	0	1	1st	
1949	1949	Eddie King	WVIAC	—	7	2		3	1		3rd	
1950	1950 ^{†}	Eddie King	WVIAC	—	10	0		5	0		1st	Tangerine Bowl: (W) Emory and Henry, 12-0
1951	1951 ^{†}	Eddie King	WVIAC	—	6	3	1	4	0		1st	Burley Bowl: (W) Lebanon Valley, 27-20
1952	1952	Eddie King	WVIAC	—	6	3		4	0		2nd	
1953	1953 ^{†}	Eddie King	WVIAC	—	6	4	1	4	0		1st	Elks Bowl: (W) East Carolina, 12-0
1954	1954 ^{†}	Eddie King	WVIAC	—	8	2		4	0		1st	Cigar Bowl: (L) Tampa, 0-21
1955	1955	Eddie King	WVIAC	—	4	5		2	0		DNQ	
1956	1956	Eddie King	WVIAC	—	5	4		1	0		DNQ	
Totals (1904–1956)					All-time: 153–188–19 (.451)			Conference: 70–66–8 (.514)			—	Postseason: 3–1 (.750)

Season	Team	Head coach	Conference	Division	Regular season results					Postseason	Final ranking	
Season	Team	Head coach	Conference	Division	Overall		Conference			Postseason	AFCA	D2
Season	Team	Head coach	Conference	Division	Win	Loss	Finish	Win	Loss	Postseason	AFCA	D2
Charleston Golden Eagles (2003–present)
2003	2003	Mike Springston	Independent	—	2	9	–	–	–	–	—	—
2004	2004	Mike Springston	Independent	—	3	7	–	–	–	–	—	—
2005	2005	Tony DeMeo	WVIAC	—	8	3	3rd	6	2	—	—	—
2006	2006	Tony DeMeo	WVIAC	—	5	6	T–3rd	4	3	—	—	—
2007	2007	Tony DeMeo	WVIAC	—	8	3	T–2nd	6	2	—	—	—
2008	2008	Tony DeMeo	WVIAC	—	7	4	T–4th	5	3	—	—	—
2009	2009	Tony DeMeo	WVIAC	—	9	2	T–2nd	6	2	—	23	—
2010	2010	Tony DeMeo	WVIAC	—	6	5	T–5th	4	4	—	—	—
2011	2011	Pat Kirkland	WVIAC	—	5	6	T–4th	5	3	—	—	—
2012	2012	Pat Kirkland	WVIAC	—	9	2	T–2nd	6	2	—	25	—
2013	2013	Pat Kirkland	MEC	—	6	5	3rd	6	3	—	—	—
2014	2014	Pat Kirkland	MEC	—	8	3	T–3rd	7	3	—	—	—
2015	2015	Pat Kirkland	MEC	—	10	2	2nd	9	1	Lost NCAA Division II First Round vs. IUP, 21-47	20	—
2016	2016	Pat Kirkland	MEC	—	3	8	T–6th	3	7	—	—	—
2017	2017	Pat Kirkland	MEC	—	4	6	T–4th	4	6	—	—	—
2018	2018	Pat Kirkland	MEC	—	6	5	4th	6	4	—	—	—
2019	2019	Pat Kirkland	MEC	—	8	3	2nd	7	3	—	—	—
2020	2020 ^{‡}	Pat Kirkland	MEC	South	3	1	1st (South)	3	0	—	—	—
2021	2021	Pat Kirkland	MEC	—	8	2	2nd	8	2	—	—	—
2022	2022	Quinn Sanders	MEC	—	6	5	T–4th	6	4	—	—	—
2023	2023 ^{†}	Quinn Sanders	MEC	—	10	2	1st	8	1	Won NCAA Division II First Round vs. New Haven, 52-44; Lost NCAA Division II Second Round vs. Kutztown, 31-32	19	18
2024	2024 ^{†}	Quinn Sanders	MEC	—	11	1	1st	9	0	Lost NCAA Division II First Round vs. Ashland, 38-40	15	18
2025	2025 ^{†}	Mike Tesch	MEC	—	8	3	T–1st	7	1	–	–	–
Totals (2003–2025)				—	All-time: 152–92 (.623)		Conference: 125–53 (.702)			Postseason: 1–3 (.250)		

Era	Seasons	Overall W–L–T	Conference W–L–T	Postseason
Morris Harvey (1904–1956)	51	153–188–19 (.451)	70–66–8 (.514)	3–1 (.750)
Charleston (2003–present)	23	152–92 (.623)	125–53 (.702)	1–3 (.250)
Combined	74	305–280–19 (.521)	195–119–8 (.618)	4–4 (.500)

  - Note: The University of Charleston, then known as Morris Harvey College, discontinued its football program after the 1956 season and reinstated it in 2003.
