= 1946 Maine Intercollegiate Athletic Conference football season =

Maine Intercollegiate Athletic Conference
- Sport: Football
- Teams: 4
- Champion: Bates

Football seasons
- 1945 1947

The 1946 Maine Intercollegiate Athletic Conference football season was the season of college football played by the four member schools of the Maine Intercollegiate Athletic Conference (MIAC) as part of the 1946 college football season. The 1946 season was the first since 1942 in which the four conference teams competed for the MIAC championship.

The Bates Bobcats won the MIAC championship with a 7–1 record and outscored opponents by a total of 101 to 30.

== Conference overview ==
| Conf. rank | Team | Head coach | Conf. record | Overall record | Points scored | Points against |
|---|---|---|---|---|---|---|
| 1 | Bates | Ducky Pond | 3–0 | 8–0 | 101 | 31 |
| 2 | Maine | George E. Allen | 2–1 | 2–5 | 81 | 95 |
| 3 | Bowdoin | Dinny Shay | 1–2 | 2–4 | 47 | 47 |
| 4 | Colby | Daniel G. Lewis | 0–3 | 1–6 | 37 | 77 |

== Teams ==
=== Bates ===
1946 Bates Bobcats football

MIAC champion

Glass Bowl, L 12–21 vs. Toledo
- Conference: Maine Intercollegiate Athletic Conference
- Record: 7–1 (3–0 MIAC)
- Head coach: Ducky Pond (2nd season)
- Home stadium: Garcelon Field

The 1946 Bates Bobcats football team represented Bates College of Lewiston, Maine. In their second, non-consecutive season under head coach Ducky Pond, and after a one-year hiatus in the football program, the Bobcats compiled a perfect 7–0 record during the regular season (3–0 against MIAC opponents), won the MIAC championship, lost to Toledo in the Glass Bowl, shut out five of eight opponents, and outscored all opponents by a total of 101 to 31.

| Date | Opponent | Site | Result | Attendance | Source |
|---|---|---|---|---|---|
| September 28 | Massachusetts State | Garcelon Field; Lewiston, ME | W 6–0 | | |
| October 5 | at Trinity (CT) | Hartford, CT | W 25–0 | | |
| October 12 | atTufts | Garcelon Field; Medford, MA | W 19–6 | | |
| October 19 | Northeastern | Garcelon Field; Lewiston, ME | W 20–0 | | |
| October 26 | at Maine | Alumni Field; Orono, ME | W 7–4 | 7,500 | |
| November 2 | Bowdoin | Garcelon Field; Lewiston, ME | W 6–0 | | |
| November 11 | Colby | Garcelon Field; Lewiston, ME (Armistice Day) | W 6–0 | | |
| December 7 | at Toledo | Glass Bowl; Toledo, OH (Glass Bowl) | L 12–21 | 12,000 | |

=== Maine ===
1946 Maine Black Bears football
- Conference: Maine Intercollegiate Athletic Conference, Yankee Conference
- Record: 2–5 (2–1 MIAC, 0–3 Yankee)
- Head coach: George E. Allen (2nd season)
- Captain: Richard Burrill
- Home stadium: Alumni Field

The 1946 Maine Black Bears football team represented the University of Maine of Orono, Maine. In its second season under head coach George E. Allen, the team compiled a 2–5 record (2–1 against MIAC opponents, 0–3 against Yankee Conference opponents) and finished in second place in the MIAC.

| Date | Opponent | Site | Result | Attendance | Source |
|---|---|---|---|---|---|
| September 28 | Rhode Island State | Alumni Field; Orono, ME | L 13–14 | 4,000 | |
| October 5 | at Northeastern* | Huntington Field; Boston, MA | L 7–13 | 4,000 | |
| October 12 | New Hampshire | Alumni Field; Orono, ME (rivalry) | L 0–27 | | |
| October 19 | at Connecticut | Gardner Dow Field; Storrs, CT | L 20–21 | 7,300 | |
| October 26 | Bates | Alumni Field; Orono, ME | L 4–7 | 7,500 | |
| November 2 | Colby | Alumni Field; Orono, ME | W 14–6 | | |
| November 9 | at Bowdoin | Brunswick, ME | W 23–7 | | |
*Non-conference game

=== Bowdoin ===
1946 Bowdoin Polar Bears football
- Conference: Maine Intercollegiate Athletic Conference
- Record: 2–4 (1–2 MIAC)
- Head coach: Dinny Shay

The 1946 Bowdoin Polar Bears football team represented Bates College of Brunswick, Maine. Led by head coach Dinny Shay, the Polar Bears compiled a 2–4 record (1–2 against MIAC opponents), finished third in the MIAC, scored 47 points, and allowed 47 points.

| Date | Opponent | Site | Result | Attendance | Source |
|---|---|---|---|---|---|
| October 5 | at Massachusetts State | Alumni Field; Amherst, MA | L 8–11 | | |
| | Amherst | | L 0–7 | | |
| | Williams | | W 26–0 | | |
| October 26 | Colby | Seaverns Field; Waterville, ME | W 6–0 | 3,800 | |
| November 2 | Bates | Garcelon Field; Lewiston, ME | L 0–6 | | |
| November 9 | Maine | Brunswick, ME | L 7–23 | | |

=== Colby ===
1946 Colby Mules football
- Conference: Maine Intercollegiate Athletic Conference
- Record: 1–6 (0–3 MIAC)
- Head coach: Daniel G. Lewis

The 1946 Colby Mules football team represented Bates College of Waterville, Maine. Led by head coach Daniel G. Lewis, the Polar Bears compiled a 1–6 record (0–3 against MIAC opponents), finished third in the MIAC, and were outscored by a total of 77 to 37.

| Date | Opponent | Site | Result | Attendance | Source |
|---|---|---|---|---|---|
| September 29 | Hew Hampshire | Seaverns Field; Waterville, ME | L 0–13 | 1,000 | |
| October 5 | Vermont | Seaverns Field; Waterville, ME | W 13–7 | 2,000 | |
| October 12 | at Coast Guard | New London, CT | L 12–18 | | |
| October 19 | Amherst | Amherst, MA | L 6–13 | | |
| October 26 | Bowdoin | Seavern's Field; Waterville, ME | L 0–6 | 3,800 | |
| November 2 | Maine | Alumni Field; Orono, ME | L 6–14 | | |
| November 11 | at Bates | Garcelon Field; Lewiston, ME | L 0–6 | | |
