= 1946 Vermont Catamounts football team =

American college football season

1946 Vermont Catamounts football
- Conference: Independent
- Record: 2–3–2
- Head coach: John C. Evans (4th season)
- Home stadium: Centennial Field

1946 New England Conference football standings
	Conf.					Overall
Team	W		L		T	W		L		T
New Hampshire +	2	–	0	–	1	6	–	1	–	1
Connecticut +	2	–	0	–	1	4	–	3	–	1
Rhode Island State	1	–	2	–	0	2	–	4	–	0
Maine	0	–	3	–	0	2	–	5	–	0
+ – Conference co-champions

The 1946 Vermont Catamounts football team was an American football team that represented the University of Vermont during the 1946 college football season. In their fourth year under head coach John C. Evans, the team compiled a 2–3–2 record.

== Schedule ==
Date	Opponent	Site	Result	Attendance	Source
October 5	at Colby	Seaverns Field; Waterville, ME	L 7–13	2,000	
October 12	Union (NY)	Centennial Field; Burlington, VT	W 32–0	5,200	
October 19	at Norwich	Sabine Field; Northfield, VT	T 0–0	3,500	
October 26	New Hampshire	Centennial Field; Burlington, VT	L 0–39	4,500	
November 2	at Massachusetts State	Alumni Field; Amherst, MA	L 20–28	3,000	
November 9	Rochester	Centennial Field; Burlington, VT	W 19–6	1,500	
November 16	Middlebury	Centennial Field; Burlington, VT	T 12–12	5,000	
