= 1946 Ohio Athletic Conference football season =

American college football season

- Sport: Football
- Teams: 21
- Champion: Otterbein

Football seasons
- 1945 1947

1946 Ohio Athletic Conference football standings
	Conf.					Overall
Team	W		L		T	W		L		T
Otterbein $	5	–	0	–	0	7	–	1	–	0
Toledo	4	–	0	–	0	6	–	2	–	2
Muskingum	4	–	0	–	1	5	–	3	–	1
Oberlin	2	–	0	–	0	4	–	2	–	1
Baldwin–Wallace	4	–	1	–	0	4	–	2	–	2
Mount Union	5	–	1	–	1	7	–	1	–	1
Findlay	3	–	1	–	0	6	–	2	–	0
Marietta	3	–	1	–	0	3	–	4	–	0
Heidelberg	5	–	2	–	1	5	–	2	–	1
Kent State	1	–	1	–	0	6	–	2	–	0
Akron	3	–	4	–	0	5	–	4	–	0
Wittenberg	3	–	4	–	0	3	–	5	–	0
Ashland	2	–	3	–	1	2	–	5	–	1
Wooster	2	–	4	–	2	2	–	4	–	2
Denison	2	–	4	–	0	2	–	6	–	0
Case	1	–	4	–	0	2	–	7	–	0
John Carroll	1	–	4	–	0	1	–	7	–	0
Kenyon	1	–	5	–	0	1	–	7	–	0
Capital	1	–	6	–	0	1	–	6	–	0
Wilmington (OH)	0	–	2	–	0	0	–	5	–	0
Ohio Northern	0	–	6	–	0	3	–	6	–	0
$ – Conference champion

The 1946 Ohio Athletic Conference football season was the season of college football played by the 21 member schools of the Ohio Athletic Conference (OAC), commonly referred to as the "Ohio Conference", as part of the 1946 college football season.

Three of the conference's head coaches, each serving their first year as a college head coach, were later inducted into the College Football Hall of Fame: Woody Hayes at Denison, Paul Hoernemann at Heidelberg, and Ed Sherman at Muskingum.

== Conference overview ==
Conf. rank	Team	Head coach	Conf. record	Overall record	Points scored	Points against
1	Otterbein	George Novotny	5–0	7–1	278	38
2	Toledo	Bill Orwig	4–0	6–2–2	200	132
3	Oberlin	Lysle K. Butler	2–0	4–2–1	136	46
4	Muskingum	Ed Sherman	4–0–1	5–3–1	122	115
5	Baldwin–Wallace	Ray E. Watts	4–1	4–2–2	163	73
6	Mount Union	Pete Pederson	5–1–1	7–1–1	127	51
7 (tie)	Findlay	Nelson M. Jones	3–1	6–2	209	25
7 (tie)	Marietta	Leonard Barnum	3–1	3–4	68	68
9	Heidelberg	Paul Hoernemann	5–2–1	5–2–1	100	68
10	Kent State	Trevor J. Rees	1–1	6–2	143	47
11 (tie)	Akron	Paul Baldacci	3–4	5–4	122	135
11 (tie)	Wittenberg	H.E. Maurer	3–4	3–5	87	105
13	Ashland	George Donges	2–3–1	2–5–1	57	114
14	Wooster	John M. Swigart	2–4–2	2–4–2	85	115
15	Denison	Woody Hayes	2–4	2–6	89	136
16 (tie)	John Carroll	Eugene Oberst	1–4	1–7	70	150
16 (tie)	Case	Ray A. Ride	1–4	2–7	77	190
18	Kenyon	D.C. Henderson	1–5	1–7	44	130
19	Capital	Dale Rose	1–6	1–6	39	155
20	Ohio Northern	Millard Murphy	0–6	3–6	108	130
21	Wilmington	Harold S. Shelly	0–2	0–5	18	108

== Teams ==
=== Otterbein ===
1946 Otterbein Cardinals football

OAC champion
- Conference: Ohio Athletic Conference
- Record: 7–1 (5–0 OAC)
- Head coach: George Novotny (1st season)

The 1946 Otterbein Cardinals football team represented Otterbein University. In their first season under head coach George Novotny, the Cardinals compiled a 7–1 record (5–0 against OAC opponent), won the OAC championship, shut out four of eight opponents, and outscored all opponents by a total of 278 to 38.

Halfback Paul Davis and center Ralph Pickelsimer were named to the 1946 All-OAC football team.

Date	Opponent	Site	Result	Attendance	Source
September 21	at West Virginia*	Mountaineer Field; Morgantown, WV	L 7–13	10,000	
September 28	at Detroit Tech*	Detroit, MI	W 57–0		
October 5	Denison	Westerville, OH	W 18–13	2,000	
October 12	Heidelberg	Westerville, OH	W 20–0		
October 19	at Ohio Northern	Kenton, OH	W 33–6	3,000	
November 2	at Capital	Columbus, OH	W 50–6	2,500	
November 9	Albion^{†}*	Westerville, OH	W 40–0	5,000	
November 16	Kenyon	Westerville, OH	W 53–0		
*Non-conference game; ^{†}Homecoming

=== Toledo ===
1946 Toledo Rockets football

Glass Bowl champion

Glass Bowl, W 21–12 vs. Bates
- Conference: Ohio Athletic Conference
- Record: 6–2–2 (3–0 OAC)
- Head coach: Bill Orwig (1st season)
- Captain: Bill Gall
- Home stadium: Glass Bowl

In their first season under head coach Bill Orwig, the Rockets compiled a 6–2–2 record, outscored their opponents by a combined total of 200 to 132, and defeated Bates, 21–12, in the first postseason Glass Bowl game.

=== Oberlin ===
1946 Oberlin Yeomen football
- Conference: Ohio Athletic Conference
- Record: 4–2–1 (2–0 OAC)
- Head coach: Lysle K. Butler (17th season)

The 1946 Oberlin Yeomen football team represented Oberlin College of Oberlin, Ohio. In their 17th season under head coach Lysle K. Butler, the Cardinals compiled a 4–2–1 record (2–0 against OAC opponents), finished in third place in the OAC, and outscored all opponents by a total of 136 to 46.

Date	Opponent	Site	Result	Attendance	Source
October 12	at Carnegie Tech*	Forbes Field; Pittsburgh, PA	W 25–0	4,000	
October 19	Ohio Wesleyan*	Oberlin, OH	L 0–13		
October 26	Denison^{†}	Oberlin, OH	W 19–12		
November 2	at Bowling Green*	University Stadium; Bowling Green, OH	L 0–14		
November 9	at DePauw*	Greencastle, IN (Old Gold Day)	T 7–7	5,000	
November 16	Allegheny*	Oberlin, OH	W 62–0		
November 23	Wooster	Oberlin, OH	W 23–0		
*Non-conference game; ^{†}Homecoming

=== Muskingum ===
1946 Muskingum Fighting Muskies football
- Conference: Ohio Athletic Conference
- Record: 5–3–1 (4–0–1 OAC)
- Head coach: Ed Sherman (2nd season)

The 1946 Muskingum Fighting Muskies football team represented Muskingum University of New Concord, Ohio. In their second season under head coach Ed Sherman, the Fighting Muskies compiled a 5–3–1 record (4–0–1 against OAC opponents), finished in fourth place in the OAC, and outscored all opponents by a total of 122 to 115.

Date	Opponent	Site	Result	Attendance	Source
September 28	Capital	McConagha Stadium; New Concord, OH	W 26–0		
October 5	Heidelberg	Tiffin, OH	W 15–0		
October 12	at Ohio*	Peden Stadium; Athens, OH	L 0–38		
October 18	Canterbury*	McConagha Stadium; New Concord, OH	W 33–12		
October 26	Wooster	McConagha Stadium; New Concord, OH	T 12–12		
November 2	at Denison	Deeds Field; Granville, OH	W 14–13	3,500	
November 9	at Washington & Jefferson*	College Field; Washington, PA	L 7–26	4,000	
November 16	Wittenberg	McConagha Stadium; New Concord, OH	W 16–14		
*Non-conference game

=== Baldwin–Wallace ===
1946 Baldwin–Wallace Yellow Jackets football
- Conference: Ohio Athletic Conference
- Record: 4–2–2 (4–1 OAC)
- Head coach: Ray E. Watts (19th season)

The 1946 Baldwin–Wallace Yellow Jackets football team represented Baldwin Wallace University of Berea, Ohio. In their 19th season under head coach Ray E. Watts, the Yellow Jackets compiled a 4–2–2 record (4–1 against OAC opponents), finished in fifth place in the OAC, and outscored opponents by a total of 163 to 73.

Date	Opponent	Site	Result	Attendance	Source
September 28	John Carroll	Berea, OH	W 48–0	10,000	
October 5	Akron	Berea, OH	W 32–0	7,000	
October 12	at Ohio Wesleyan	Selby Stadium; Delaware, OH	T 0–0		
October 18	at Western Reserve*	Shaw Stadium; East Cleveland, OH	T 13–13		
October 26	Kent State	Berea, OH	W 21–12		
November 1	at Case	Cleveland, OH	W 28–13		
November 9	at Ohio*	Peden Stadium; Athens, OH	L 14–21		
November 16	Toledo	Berea, OH	L 7–14	4,500	
*Non-conference game

=== Mount Union ===
1946 Mount Union Purple Raiders football
- Conference: Ohio Athletic Conference
- Record: 7–1–1 (5–1–1 OAC)
- Head coach: Pete Pederson (2nd season)

The 1946 Mount Union Purple Raiders football team represented the University of Mount Union of Alliance, Ohio. In their second season under head coach Pete Pederson, the Purple Raiders compiled a 7–1–1 record (5–1–1 against OAC opponents), finished in sixth place in the OAC, and outscored opponents by a total of 127 to 51.

Date	Opponent	Site	Result	Attendance	Source
	Findlay		W 12–0		
	Bethany*		W 20–6		
	Ashland		T 6–6		
October 19	Akron	Alliance, OH	W 12–7		
October 26	at Case	Shaw Stadium; East Cleveland, OH	L 0–13		
	Wooster		W 7–5		
	Allegheny*		W 25–0		
	Ohio Northern		W 26–2		
	Kenyon		W 19–12		
*Non-conference game

=== Findlay ===
1946 Findlay Oilers football
- Conference: Ohio Athletic Conference
- Record: 6–2 (3–1 OAC)
- Head coach: Nelson M. Jones

The 1946 Findlay Oilers football team represented the University of Findlay of Findlay, Ohio. Led by head coach Nelson M. Jones, the Oilers compiled a 6–2 record (3–1 against OAC opponents), finished in a tie for seventh place in the OAC, shut out five of eight opponents, and outscored all opponents by a total of 209 to 25.

Date	Opponent	Site	Result	Attendance	Source
	Mount Union		L 0–12		
	Wooster		W 27–6		
	Ohio Northern		W 24–0		
	Defiance		L 6–7		
	Bluffton*		W 41–0		
	Ashland		W 40–0		
	Cedarville		W 58–0		
October 25	Adrian*		W 13–0		
*Non-conference game

=== Marietta ===
1946 Marietta Pioneers football
- Conference: Ohio Athletic Conference
- Record: 3–4 (3–1 OAC)
- Head coach: Leonard Barnum

The 1946 Marietta Pioneers football team represented the Marietta College of Marietta, Ohio. Led by head coach Leonard Barnum, the Pioneers compiled a 3–4 record (3–1 against OAC opponents), finished in a tie for seventh place in the OAC, scored 68 point, and gave up 68 points.

Date	Opponent	Site	Result	Attendance	Source
	West Virginia Tech*		L 0–21		
	Capital		W 12–0		
	Rio Grande*		W 6–7		
	Kenyon		W 12–0		
	Wilmington		W 18–0		
	Wittenberg		L 0–7		
	West Virginia Wesleyan*		L 20–33		
*Non-conference game

=== Heidelberg ===
1946 Heidelberg Student Princes football
- Conference: Ohio Athletic Conference
- Record: 5–2–1 (5–2–1 OAC)
- Head coach: Paul Hoernemann (1st season)

The 1946 Heidelberg Student Princes football team represented the Heidelberg University of Tiffin, Ohio. In their first season under head coach Paul Hoernemann, the Student Princes compiled a 5–2–1 record (5–2–1 against OAC opponents), finished in ninth place in the OAC, and outscored opponents by a total of 100 to 68.

Date	Opponent	Site	Result	Attendance	Source
	Ashland		W 7–0		
October 5	Muskingum	Tiffin, OH	L 0–15		
October 12	at Otterbein	Westerville, OH	L 0–20		
	Capital		W 40–6		
	Wittenberg		W 13–6		
	Ohio Northern		W 20–7		
	Kenyon		W 6–0		
	Wooster		T 14–14		

=== Kent State ===
1946 Kent State Golden Flashes football
- Conference: Ohio Athletic Conference
- Record: 6–2 (1–1 OAC)
- Head coach: Trevor J. Rees (1st season)
- Home stadium: Memorial Stadium

In their first season under head coach Trevor J. Rees, the Golden Flashes compiled a 6–2 record and ranked fourth nationally among small-college teams with an average of 349.1 yards per game in total offense. They also ranked fourth nationally in total defense, giving up an average of only 115.1 yards per game.

=== Akron ===
1946 Akron Zippers football
- Conference: Independent
- Record: 5–4
- Head coach: Paul Baldacci (1st season)
- Home stadium: Rubber Bowl

In their first season under head coach Paul Baldacci, the Zippers compiled a 5–4 record and were outscored by a total of 134 to 122.

=== Wittenberg ===
1946 Wittenberg Tigers football
- Conference: Ohio Athletic Conference
- Record: 3–5 (3–4 OAC)
- Head coach: H.E. Maurer

The 1946 Wittenberg Tigers football team represented the Wittenberg University of Springfield, Ohio. Led by head coach H.E. Maurer, the Tigers compiled a 3–5 record (3–4 against OAC opponents), finished in a tie for 11th place in the OAC, and were outscored opponents by a total of 105 to 87.

Date	Opponent	Site	Result	Attendance	Source
October 4	at Louisville	Louisville, KY	L 0–19	6,000	
	Wilmington		W 39–0		
	Ashland		L 7–13		
	Heidelberg		L 6–13		
	Marietta		W 7–0		
	Ohio Northern		W 14–13		
November 16	at Muskingum	McConagha Stadium; New Concord, OH	L 14–16		
November 23	Denison	Wittenberg Stadium; Springfield, OH	L 0–31		

=== Ashland ===
1946 Ashland Eagles football
- Conference: Ohio Athletic Conference
- Record: 2–5–1 (2–3–1 OAC)
- Head coach: George Donges

The 1946 Ashland Eagles football team represented Ashland University of Ashland, Ohio. Led by head coach George Donges, the Tigers compiled a 2–5–1 record (2–3–1 against OAC opponents), finished in 13th place in the OAC, and were outscored opponents by a total of 114 to 57.

Date	Opponent	Site	Result	Attendance	Source
	Heidelberg		L 0–7		
	Ohio Northern		W 6–0		
	Mount Union		T 6–6		
	Wittenberg		W 13–7		
	Hiram*		L 12–26		
	Kenyon		L 13–20		
	Findlay		L 0–40		
November 16	at Albion*	Albion, MI	L 7–8		
*Non-conference game

=== Wooster ===
1946 Wooster Fighting Scots football
- Conference: Ohio Athletic Conference
- Record: 2–4–2 (2–4–2 OAC)
- Head coach: John M. Swigart

The 1946 Wooster Fighting Scots football team represented the College of Wooster of Wooster, Ohio. Led by head coach John M. Swigart, the Fighting Scots compiled a 2–4–2 record (2–4–2 against OAC opponents), finished in 14th place in the OAC, and were outscored opponents by a total of 115 to 85.

Date	Opponent	Site	Result	Attendance	Source
	Findlay		L 6–27		
	Capital		W 7–6		
October 19	Denison	Wooster, OH	W 21–0		
October 26	at Muskingum	McConagha Stadium; New Concord, OH	T 12–12		
	Mount Union		L 5–7		
November 9	at Akron	Rubber Bowl; Akron, OH	L 20–26		
	Heidelberg		T 14–14		
November 23	at Oberlin	Oberlin, OH	L 0–23		

=== Denison ===
1946 Denison Big Red football
- Conference: Ohio Athletic Conference
- Record: 2–6 (2–4 OAC)
- Head coach: Woody Hayes (1st season)

The 1946 Denison Big Red football team represented Denison University of Granville, Ohio. The Big Red compiled a 2–6 record (2–4 against OAC opponents), finished in 15th place in the OAC, and was outscored by a total of 136 to 89.

Woody Hayes, at age 33, was hired as Denison's head coach in March 1946. It was his first collegiate head coaching job. He had been a high school coach before World War II and served as athletic officer at the Naval Academy in 1942.

In the final Litkenhous Ratings released in mid-December, Denison was ranked at No. 142 out of 500 college football teams.

Date	Opponent	Site	Result	Attendance	Source
October 5	at Otterbein	Westerville, OH	L 13–18	2,000	
October 12	Washington & Jefferson*	Deeds Field; Granville, OH	L 6–12	3,500	
October 19	at Wooster	Wooster, OH	L 0–21		
October 26	Oberlin	Oberlin, OH	L 12–19		
November 2	Muskingum	Deeds Field; Granville, OH (Dad's Day)	L 13–14	3,500	
November 9	Capital	Deeds Field; Granville, OH	W 14–13		
November 16	Ohio Wesleyan*	Deeds Field; Granville, OH	L 0–39		
November 23	at Wittenberg	Wittenberg Stadium; Springfield, OH	W 31–0		
*Non-conference game

=== John Carroll ===
1946 John Carroll Blue Streaks football
- Conference: Ohio Athletic Conference
- Record: 1–7 (1–4 OAC)
- Head coach: Eugene Oberst (1st season)

The 1946 John Carroll Blue Streaks football team represented John Carroll University of University Heights, Ohio. In their first year under head coach Eugene Oberst, the Blue Streaks compiled a 1–7 record (1–4 against OAC opponents), finished in a tie for 16th place in the OAC, and were outscored by a total of 150 to 70.

Date	Opponent	Site	Result	Attendance	Source
September 28	at Baldwin-Wallace	Berea, OH	L 0–48	10,000	
October 5	Kent State	Cleveland, OH	L 7–20		
October 11	at Xavier*	Xavier Stadium; Cincinnati, OH	L 6–7	4,000	
October 19	Case	Shaw Stadium; East Cleveland, OH	W 19–7		
	Niagara*		L 6–14		
November 2	at Toledo	Glass Bowl; Toledo, OH	L 19–28		
November 9	at Western Reserve	Shaw Stadium; East Cleveland, OH	L 7–13		
November 23	Akron	Rubber Bowl; Akron, OH	L 6–13	2,600	
*Non-conference game

=== Case ===
1946 Case Rough Riders football
- Conference: Ohio Athletic Conference
- Record: 2–7 (1–4 OAC)
- Head coach: Ray A. Ride (16th season)

The 1946 Case Rough Riders football team represented Case School of Applied Science (now part of Case Western Reserve University). In their 17th year under head coach Ray A. Ride, the Rough Riders compiled a 2–7 record (1–4 against OAC opponents), finished in a tie for 16th place in the OAC, and were outscored by a total of 190 to 77.

Date	Opponent	Site	Result	Attendance	Source
September 28	Ohio Wesleyan*	Shaw Stadium; East Cleveland, OH	L 0–27		
October 5	at Toledo	Glass Bowl; Toledo, OH	L 14–42		
October 12	at Akron	Rubber Bowl; Akron, OH	L 0–13	1,978	
October 19	John Carroll	Shaw Stadium; East Cleveland, OH	L 7–19		
October 26	Mount Union	Shaw Stadium; East Cleveland, OH	W 13–0		
November 2	Baldwin-Wallace	Shaw Stadium; East Cleveland, OH	L 13–28		
November 9	at Carnegie Tech*	Pittsburgh, PA	W 24–0		
November 16	at Wayne	Keyworth Stadium; Detroit, MI	L 6–37	2,157	
November 28	Western Reserve	Municipal Stadium; Cleveland, OH	L 0–24	13,000	
*Non-conference game

=== Kenyon ===
1946 Kenyon Lords football
- Conference: Ohio Athletic Conference
- Record: 1–7 (1–5 OAC)
- Head coach: D.C. Henderson

The 1946 Kenyon Lords football team represented Kenyon College of Gambier, Ohio. Led by head coach D.C. Henderson, the Lords compiled a 1–7 record (1–5 against OAC opponents), finished in 18th place in the OAC, and were outscored by a total of 130 to 44.

Date	Opponent	Site	Result	Attendance	Source
	Hiram*		L 0–6		
	Marietta		L 0–12		
	Capital		L 6–8		
	Ashland		W 20–13		
	Heidelberg		L 0–6		
November 16	at Otterbein	Westerville, OH	L 0–53		
	Mount Union		L 12–19		
	Sewanee*		L 6–13		
*Non-conference game

=== Capital ===
1946 Capital Crusaders football
- Conference: Ohio Athletic Conference
- Record: 1–6 (1–6 OAC)
- Head coach: Dale Rose

The 1946 Capital Crusaders football team represented Capital University of Columbus, Ohio. Led by head coach Dale Rose, the Crusaders compiled a 1–6 record (1–6 against OAC opponents), finished in 19th place in the OAC, and were outscored by a total of 155 to 39.

Date	Opponent	Site	Result	Attendance	Source
September 28	at Muskingum	McConagha Stadium; New Concord, OH	L 0–26		
	Marietta		L 0–12		
	Wooster		L 6–7		
	Heidelberg		L 6–40		
	Kenyon		W 8–6		
November 2	Otterbein	Columbus, OH	L 6–50	2,500	
November 9	Denison	Deeds Field; Granville, OH	L 13–15		

=== Ohio Northern ===
1946 Ohio Northern Polar Bears football
- Conference: Ohio Athletic Conference
- Record: 3–6 (0–6 OAC)
- Head coach: Millard Murphy

The 1946 Ohio Northern Polar Bears football team represented Ohio Northern University of Ada, Ohio. Led by head coach Millard Murphy, the Polar Bears compiled a 3–6 record (0–6 against OAC opponents), finished in 20th place in the OAC, and were outscored by a total of 130 to 108.

Date	Opponent	Site	Result	Attendance	Source
	Cedarville		W 18–0		
	Rio Grande		W 13–7		
	Ashland		L 0–6		
	Findlay		L 0–24		
	Otterbein		L 6–33		
	Bluffton		W 48–0		
	Heidelberg		L 7–20		
	Wittenberg		L 13–14		
	Mount Union		L 2–26		

=== Wilmington ===
1946 Wilmington Quakers football
- Conference: Ohio Athletic Conference
- Record: 0–5 (0–2 OAC)
- Head coach: Harold S. Shelly

The 1946 Wilmington Quakers football team represented Wilmington College of Wilmington, Ohio. Led by head coach Harold S. Shelly, the Quakers compiled a 0–5 record (0–2 against OAC opponents), finished in last place in the OAC, and were outscored by a total of 108 to 18.

Date	Opponent	Site	Result	Attendance	Source
	Bluffton*		L 12–13		
	Wittenberg		L 0–39		
October 18	Earlham*	Wilmington, OH	L 6–13		
	Marietta		L 0–18		
November 2	at Franklin*	Franklin, IN	L 0–25		
*Non-conference game

== All-conference team ==
The Associated Press selected a 1946 All-Ohio Conference football team consisting of the following players:

- Backs: Kenneth Funk, Ashland; Paul Davis, Otterbein; Lee Tressell, Baldwin-Wallace; Vince Marotta Mount Union
- Ends: Joe Papp, Akron; McKey Thomas, Baldwin-Wallace
- Tackles: Ted Zuchowski, Toledo; Owen Ziebold, Findlay
- Guards: Frank Mesek, Kent State; Art Burton, Findlay
- Center: Ralph Pickeleseimer, Otterbein
