= 1946 New Hampshire Wildcats football team =

American college football season

1946 New Hampshire Wildcats football
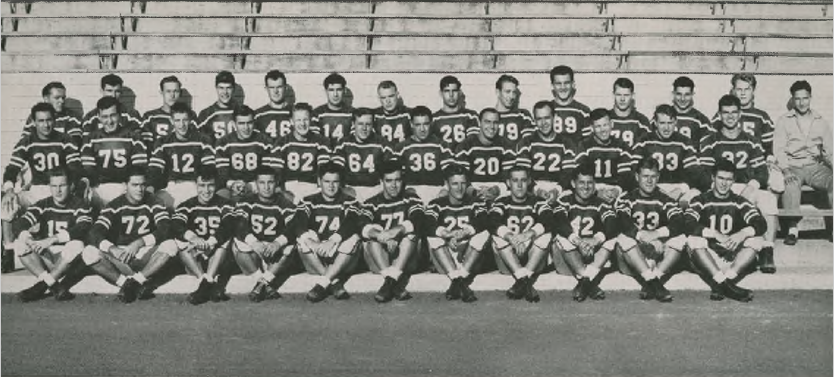

New England Conference co-champion
- Conference: New England Conference
- Record: 6–1–1 (2–0–1 New England Conference)
- Head coach: Bill Glassford (1st season)
- Captain: Ralph Pino
- Home stadium: Lewis Field

1946 New England Conference football standings
	Conf.					Overall
Team	W		L		T	W		L		T
New Hampshire +	2	–	0	–	1	6	–	1	–	1
Connecticut +	2	–	0	–	1	4	–	3	–	1
Rhode Island State	1	–	2	–	0	2	–	4	–	0
Maine	0	–	3	–	0	2	–	5	–	0
+ – Conference co-champions

The 1946 New Hampshire Wildcats football team was an American football team that represented the University of New Hampshire as a member of the New England Conference during the 1946 college football season. In its first year under head coach Bill Glassford, the team compiled a 6–1–1 record, outscoring their opponents 161–45. The team played its home games at Lewis Field (also known as Lewis Stadium) in Durham, New Hampshire.

Due to World War II, the Wildcats had not fielded a team in 1945. With the exception of a four-game limited schedule played in 1944, this was the first football season for the Wildcats since 1942, and their first eight-game season since 1941.

== Schedule ==
Date	Opponent	Site	Result	Attendance	Source
September 28	at Colby*	Seaverns Field; Waterville, ME	W 13–0	1,000	
October 5	Rhode Island State	Lewis Field; Durham, NH	W 25–12	6,000	
October 12	at Maine	Alumni Field; Orono, ME (rivalry)	W 27–0		
October 19	Springfield*^{†}	Lewis Field; Durham, NH	L 6–14	7,000	
October 26	at Vermont*	Centennial Field; Burlington, VT	W 39–0	4,500	
November 2	Northeastern*	Lewis Field; Durham, NH	W 26–0	6,500	(Note: Northeastern game ended approximately six minutes early due to darkness, by mutual agreement of coaches and officials.)
November 9	at Boston University*	Nickerson Field (Note: During this era, Boston University played at a Nickerson Field in Weston; this is not the Nickerson Field later used in Boston.); Weston, MA	W 13–7		
November 16	Connecticut	Lewis Field; Durham, NH	T 12–12	6,000	
*Non-conference game; ^{†}Homecoming; Source:

Wildcat Carmen Ragonese, selected by the Boston Yanks in the 1948 NFL draft, was a 1982 inductee to the university's athletic hall of fame. One of his 1946 highlights was an endzone-to-endzone interception return against Rhode Island State; reported as 101 yards in contemporary newspapers, it still stands as a Wildcat record, listed by the university as 104 yards.
