= 1948 Denison Big Red football team =

College football season

1948 Denison Big Red football
- Conference: Ohio Athletic Conference
- Record: 8–0 (6–0 OAC)
- Head coach: Woody Hayes (3rd season)
- Captains: Ed Rupp; Bill Wehr
- Home stadium: Deeds Field

1948 Ohio Athletic Conference football standings
	Conf.					Overall
Team	W		L		T	W		L		T
Heidelberg $	7	–	0	–	0	9	–	0	–	0
Denison	6	–	0	–	0	8	–	0	–	0
Kent State	3	–	0	–	0	6	–	2	–	1
Ohio Wesleyan	2	–	0	–	0	6	–	2	–	0
Wilmington (OH)	1	–	0	–	0	5	–	3	–	1
Mount Union	6	–	2	–	0	6	–	3	–	0
Ohio Northern	2	–	2	–	0	5	–	3	–	1
Muskingum	3	–	3	–	1	3	–	4	–	1
Capital	3	–	4	–	0	4	–	4	–	0
Findlay	1	–	2	–	0	4	–	3	–	1
Marietta	1	–	2	–	0	4	–	4	–	0
Wooster	2	–	5	–	1	3	–	6	–	1
Oberlin	1	–	3	–	0	3	–	5	–	0
Akron	1	–	4	–	0	2	–	6	–	0
Wittenberg	1	–	6	–	0	1	–	7	–	0
Otterbein	0	–	4	–	0	2	–	6	–	1
Kenyon	0	–	3	–	0	1	–	6	–	1
$ – Conference champion

The 1948 Denison Big Red football team was an American football team that represented Denison University as a member of the Ohio Athletic Conference (OAC) during the 1948 college football season. In their third and final year under head coach Woody Hayes, the Big Red compiled an 8–0 record (6–0 in conference games), finished second in the OAC, and outscored opponents by a total of 277 to 53. Heidelberg was also undefeated and, having won seven conference games, was awarded the conference championship.

It was Denison's second consecutive perfect season under Hayes. The program won 18 consecutive games under Hayes, starting with the final game of the 1946 season. Hayes moved on to become head football coach at Miami University in 1949 and then Ohio State University in 1951.

Denison in 1948 tallied 2,317 rushing yards and 786 passing yards for a total of 3,103 yards (6.8 yards per play). On defense, the team held opponents to only 784 rushing yards and 406 passing yards for a total of 1,190 yards (2.8 yards per play).

Rix N. Yard was the team's assistant coach and the school's head basketball coach. Back Ed Rupp and center Bill Wehr were the team captains. Wehr was also selected as the team's most valuable player and as the first-team center on the 1948 Little All-America college football team. Three Denison players were selected as first-team players on the Associated Press 1948 All-Ohio Conference football team: Rupp; Wehr; and end William Hart.

The team played its home games at Deeds Field in Granville, Ohio.

== Schedule ==
Date	Opponent	Site	Result	Source
September 25	Otterbein	Deeds Field; Granville, OH	W 38–7	
October 2	at Capital	Bexley High School; Columbus, OH	W 54–0	
October 9	Beloit*	Deeds Field; Granville, OH	W 40–6	
October 16	at Wooster	Wooster, OH	W 27–0	
October 23	at Oberlin	Oberlin, OH	W 38–13	
October 30	Muskingum	Deeds Field; Granville, OH	W 7–6	
November 6	at Wittenberg	Springfield, OH	W 32–14	
November 13	Case*	Deeds Field; Granville OH	W 41–7	
*Non-conference game
