= 1944 Maine Black Bears football team =

American college football season

1944 Maine Black Bears football

New England co-champion
- Conference: New England Conference
- Record: 2–2 (1–1 New England)
- Head coach: William C. Kenyon (2nd season)
- Captain: Eugene Long
- Home stadium: Alumni Field

1944 New England Conference football standings
	Conf.					Overall
Team	W		L		T	W		L		T
New Hampshire +	1	–	1	–	0	1	–	3	–	0
Maine +	1	–	1	–	0	2	–	2	–	0
Connecticut	0	–	0	–	0	7	–	1	–	0
+ – Conference co-champions

The 1944 Maine Black Bears football team was an American football team that represented the University of Maine as a member of the New England Conference during the 1944 college football season. In its second season under head coach William C. Kenyon, the team compiled a 2–2 record (1–1 against conference opponents) and tied for the conference championship. The team played its home games at Alumni Field in Orono, Maine. Eugene Long was the team captain.

== Schedule ==
Date	Opponent	Site	Result	Attendance	Source
October 21	New Hampshire	Alumni Field; Orono, ME (rivalry)	W 13–6		
October 28	at Norwich*	Northfield, VT	L 6–13		
November 4	Norwich*	Alumni Field; Orono, ME	W 26–6		
November 11	at New Hampshire	Durham, NH (rivalry)	L 14–19	1,200	
*Non-conference game
