= 1950 Northern Illinois State Huskies football team =

American college football season

1950 Northern Illinois State Huskies football
- Conference: Interstate Intercollegiate Athletic Conference
- Record: 3–6 (2–4 IIAC)
- Head coach: Chick Evans (22nd season)
- MVP: Ernie Wickstrom
- Captain: Eugene Duda
- Home stadium: DeKalb Township High School Field

1950 Interstate Intercollegiate Athletic Conference football standings
	Conf.					Overall
Team	W		L		T	W		L		T
Illinois State Normal $	5	–	0	–	1	7	–	1	–	2
Western Illinois	4	–	1	–	0	7	–	1	–	0
Central Michigan	2	–	2	–	0	6	–	4	–	0
Eastern Illinois	2	–	2	–	0	5	–	3	–	0
Northern Illinois State	2	–	4	–	0	3	–	6	–	0
Southern Illinois	1	–	3	–	1	3	–	5	–	1
Michigan State Normal	0	–	4	–	0	3	–	6	–	0
$ – Conference champion

The 1950 Northern Illinois State Huskies football team represented Northern Illinois State Teachers College—now known as Northern Illinois University—as a member of the Interstate Intercollegiate Athletic Conference (IIAC) during the 1950 college football season. Led by 22nd-year head coach Chick Evans, the Huskies compiled an overall record of 3–6 with a mark of 2–4 in conference play, placing fifth in the IIAC. The team played their home games at the DeKalb Township High School football field, as their usual home of Glidden Field was being renovated during the season.

== Schedule ==
Date	Opponent	Site	Result	Attendance	Source
September 23	at Western Michigan*	Waldo Stadium; Kalamazoo, MI	L 13–40	8,000	
September 30	Omaha*	DeKalb Township High School Field; DeKalb, IL	W 27–25	4,000	
October 7	at Michigan State Normal	Briggs Field; Ypsilanti, MI	W 35–13		
October 14	Southern Illinois^{†}	DeKalb Township High School Field; DeKalb, IL	W 44–20	6,000	
October 21	at Western Illinois	Hanson Field; Macomb, IL	L 27–28		
October 27	at Kent State*	Memorial Stadium; Kent, OH	L 7–56		
November 3	Central Michigan	DeKalb Township High School Field; DeKalb, IL	L 14–26		
November 11	Illinois State Normal	DeKalb Township High School Field; DeKalb, IL	L 12–13		
November 18	at Eastern Illinois	Lincoln Field; Charleston, IL	L 13–34		
*Non-conference game; ^{†}Homecoming
