= 1950 Akron Zippers football team =

American college football season

1950 Akron Zippers football
- Conference: Ohio Athletic Conference
- Record: 2–7 (1–3 OAC)
- Head coach: William Houghton (3rd season)
- Captain: Tony Laterza
- Home stadium: Rubber Bowl

1950 Ohio Athletic Conference football standings
	Conf.					Overall
Team	W		L		T	W		L		T
Muskingum $	6	–	0	–	0	7	–	1	–	0
Ohio Wesleyan	4	–	0	–	1	5	–	3	–	1
Oberlin	3	–	1	–	0	7	–	1	–	0
Heidelberg	3	–	1	–	0	7	–	2	–	0
Mount Union	3	–	1	–	0	6	–	2	–	0
Wittenberg	3	–	1	–	1	4	–	4	–	1
Kent State	2	–	1	–	0	5	–	4	–	0
Denison	3	–	3	–	0	4	–	4	–	0
Otterbein	2	–	4	–	0	3	–	5	–	0
Akron	1	–	3	–	0	2	–	7	–	0
Marietta	1	–	4	–	0	2	–	6	–	0
Wooster	0	–	6	–	0	1	–	6	–	1
Capital	0	–	6	–	0	0	–	8	–	0
$ – Conference champion

The 1950 Akron Zippers football team was an American football team that represented the University of Akron in the Ohio Athletic Conference (OAC) during the 1950 college football season. In its third season under head coach William Houghton, the team compiled a 2–7 record (1–3 against OAC opponents) and was outscored by a total of 185 to 131. Tony Laterza was the team captain for the second consecutive season. The team played its home games at the Rubber Bowl in Akron, Ohio.

== Schedule ==
Date	Opponent	Site	Result	Attendance	Source
September 23	Ohio*	Rubber Bowl; Akron, OH	L 6–28		
September 30	Michigan State Normal*	Rubber Bowl; Akron, OH	W 40–7	4,000	
October 7	at Baldwin–Wallace*	Berea, OH	L 6–33		
October 14	at Carnegie Tech*	Pittsburgh, PA	L 6–26		
October 21	at Mount Union	Alliance, OH	L 19–32		
October 28	Wooster	Rubber Bowl; Akron, OH	W 34–7		
November 4	at Geneva*	Beaver Falls, PA	L 6–12		
November 11	Kent State	Rubber Bowl; Akron, OH (Wagon Wheel)	L 7–19		
November 18	Heidelberg	Rubber Bowl; Akron, OH	L 7–21		
*Non-conference game
