= 1946 Maine Black Bears football team =

American college football season

1946 Maine Black Bears football
- Conference: Maine Intercollegiate Athletic Conference, New England Conference
- Record: 2–5 (2–1 MIAC, 0–3 New England Conference)
- Head coach: George E. Allen (2nd season)
- Captain: Richard Burrill
- Home stadium: Alumni Field

1946 Maine Intercollegiate Athletic Conference football standings
	Conf.					Overall
Team	W		L		T	W		L		T
Bates $	3	–	0	–	0	7	–	1	–	0
Maine	2	–	1	–	0	2	–	5	–	0
Bowdoin	1	–	2	–	0	2	–	4	–	0
Colby	0	–	3	–	0	1	–	6	–	0
+ – Conference co-champions

1946 New England Conference football standings
	Conf.					Overall
Team	W		L		T	W		L		T
New Hampshire +	2	–	0	–	1	6	–	1	–	1
Connecticut +	2	–	0	–	1	4	–	3	–	1
Rhode Island State	1	–	2	–	0	2	–	4	–	0
Maine	0	–	3	–	0	2	–	5	–	0
+ – Conference co-champions

The 1946 Maine Black Bears football team was an American football team that represented the University of Maine as a member of the Maine Intercollegiate Athletic Conference (MIAC) and the New England Conference during the 1946 college football season. In its second season under head coach George E. Allen, the team compiled a 2–5 record (2–1 against MIAC opponents, 0–3 against New England Conference opponents) and finished in second place in the MIAC and last place in the New England Conference. Richard Burrill was the team captain. The team played its home games at Alumni Field in Orono, Maine.

== Schedule ==
Date	Opponent	Site	Result	Attendance	Source
September 28	Rhode Island State	Alumni Field; Orono, ME	L 13–14	4,000	
October 5	at Northeastern*	Huntington Field; Boston, MA	L 7–13	4,000	
October 12	New Hampshire	Alumni Field; Orono, ME (rivalry)	L 0–27		
October 19	at Connecticut	Gardner Dow Field; Storrs, CT	L 20–21	7,300	
October 26	Bates	Alumni Field; Orono, ME	L 4–7	7,500	
November 2	Colby	Alumni Field; Orono, ME	W 14–6		
November 9	at Bowdoin	Brunswick, ME	W 23–7		
*Non-conference game
