= 1948 Kent State Golden Flashes football team =

American college football season

1948 Kent State Golden Flashes football
- Conference: Ohio Athletic Conference
- Record: 6–2–1 (3–0 OAC)
- Head coach: Trevor J. Rees (3rd season)
- Home stadium: Memorial Stadium

1948 Ohio Athletic Conference football standings
	Conf.					Overall
Team	W		L		T	W		L		T
Heidelberg $	7	–	0	–	0	9	–	0	–	0
Denison	6	–	0	–	0	8	–	0	–	0
Kent State	3	–	0	–	0	6	–	2	–	1
Ohio Wesleyan	2	–	0	–	0	6	–	2	–	0
Wilmington (OH)	1	–	0	–	0	5	–	3	–	1
Mount Union	6	–	2	–	0	6	–	3	–	0
Ohio Northern	2	–	2	–	0	5	–	3	–	1
Muskingum	3	–	3	–	1	3	–	4	–	1
Capital	3	–	4	–	0	4	–	4	–	0
Findlay	1	–	2	–	0	4	–	3	–	1
Marietta	1	–	2	–	0	4	–	4	–	0
Wooster	2	–	5	–	1	3	–	6	–	1
Oberlin	1	–	3	–	0	3	–	5	–	0
Akron	1	–	4	–	0	2	–	6	–	0
Wittenberg	1	–	6	–	0	1	–	7	–	0
Otterbein	0	–	4	–	0	2	–	6	–	1
Kenyon	0	–	3	–	0	1	–	6	–	1
$ – Conference champion

The 1948 Kent State Golden Flashes football team was an American football team that represented Kent State University in the Ohio Athletic Conference (OAC) during the 1948 college football season. In its third season under head coach Trevor J. Rees, Kent State compiled a 6–2–1 record.

Kent State was ranked at No. 104 in the final Litkenhous Difference by Score System ratings for 1948.

== Schedule ==
Date	Opponent	Site	Result	Attendance	Source
September 24	at Mount Union	Mount Union Stadium; Alliance, OH	W 18–0		
October 2	Wooster	Memorial Stadium; Kent, OH	W 39–0		
October 8	Waynesburg*	Memorial Stadium; Kent, OH	W 34–7		
October 16	at Central Michigan*	Alumni Field; Mount Pleasant, MI	W 28–0		
October 23	at Western Reserve*	League Park; Cleveland, OH	T 14–14		
October 29	Youngstown*	Memorial Stadium; Kent, OH	L 7–19		
November 6	Bowling Green*^{†}	Memorial Stadium; Kent, OH (rivalry)	L 14–23	12,000	
November 12	at Akron	Rubber Bowl; Akron, OH (Wagon Wheel)	W 31–0		
November 20	at Connecticut*	Gardner Dow Athletic Fields; Storrs, CT	W 42–26		
*Non-conference game; ^{†}Homecoming
