= 1950 Central Michigan Chippewas football team =

American college football season

1950 Central Michigan Chippewas football
- Conference: Interstate Intercollegiate Athletic Conference
- Record: 6–4 (2–2 IIAC)
- Head coach: Warren Schmakel (1st season)
- Home stadium: Alumni Field

1950 Interstate Intercollegiate Athletic Conference football standings
| | Conf. | | | | | Overall |
| Team | W | | L | | T | W | | L | | T |
|---|---|---|---|---|---|---|---|---|---|---|
| Illinois State Normal $ | 5 | – | 0 | – | 1 | 7 | – | 1 | – | 2 |
| Western Illinois | 4 | – | 1 | – | 0 | 7 | – | 1 | – | 0 |
| Central Michigan | 2 | – | 2 | – | 0 | 6 | – | 4 | – | 0 |
| Eastern Illinois | 2 | – | 2 | – | 0 | 5 | – | 3 | – | 0 |
| Northern Illinois State | 2 | – | 4 | – | 0 | 3 | – | 6 | – | 0 |
| Southern Illinois | 1 | – | 3 | – | 1 | 3 | – | 5 | – | 1 |
| Michigan State Normal | 0 | – | 4 | – | 0 | 3 | – | 6 | – | 0 |
$ – Conference champion

The 1950 Central Michigan Chippewas football team represented Central Michigan College of Education, later renamed Central Michigan University, in the Interstate Intercollegiate Athletic Conference (IIAC) during the 1950 college football season. In their first and only season under head coach Warren Schmakel, the Chippewas compiled a 6–4 record (2–2 against IIAC opponents) and outscored all opponents by a combined total of 209 to 125.

Three Central Michigan players (quarterback Andy MacDonald, end John Partenio, and tackle Jim Schultz) received first-team honors on the All-IIAC team. McDonald broke Central's passing record and led the country's small colleges in passes completed, yards gained, and percentage of completions.

Coach Schmakel resigned after the 1950 season to accept a coaching position at Miami of Ohio. Shmakel was Central Michigan's fourth head football coach in six years. The assistant coaches for the 1950 season were Bill Theunissen, James Jones, Doc Sweeney (line coach, 12th year), Al Thomas, and Bob Bentley.

== Schedule ==
| Date | Opponent | Site | Result | Attendance | Source |
|---|---|---|---|---|---|
| September 18 | Alma* | Alumni Field; Mount Pleasant, MI | W 19–0 | 3,000 | |
| September 23 | at Western Illinois | Hanson Field; Macomb, IL | L 7–28 | | |
| September 30 | at Western Michigan* | Waldo Stadium; Kalamazoo, MI (rivalry) | L 13–21 | 6,000 | |
| October 7 | Illinois State Normal | Alumni Field; Mount Pleasant, MI | L 13–14 | 3,000 | |
| October 14 | Bowling Green*^{†} | Alumni Field; Mount Pleasant, MI | W 12–0 | 6,000 | |
| October 21 | at DePauw* | Blackstock Stadium; Greencastle, IN | W 33–20 | | |
| October 28 | at Michigan Normal | Briggs Field; Ypsilanti, MI (rivalry) | W 26–7 | | |
| November 3 | at Northern Illinois | DeKalb Township High School Field; DeKalb, IL | W 26–14 | | |
| November 11 | Ferris Institute* | Alumni Field; Mount Pleasant, MI | W 40–0 | | |
| November 18 | at Hillsdale* | Hillsdale, MI | L 20–21 | | |
*Non-conference game; ^{†}Homecoming

== See also ==
- 1950 in Michigan
