= 1944 Connecticut Huskies football team =

American college football season

1944 Connecticut Huskies football
- Conference: New England Conference
- Record: 7–1 (0–0 New England)
- Head coach: J. Orlean Christian (10th season)
- Home stadium: Gardner Dow Athletic Fields

1944 New England Conference football standings
	Conf.					Overall
Team	W		L		T	W		L		T
New Hampshire +	1	–	1	–	0	1	–	3	–	0
Maine +	1	–	1	–	0	2	–	2	–	0
Connecticut	0	–	0	–	0	7	–	1	–	0
+ – Conference co-champions

The 1944 Connecticut Huskies football team represented the University of Connecticut in the 1944 college football season. The Huskies were led by tenth-year head coach J. Orlean Christian and completed the season with a record of 7–1. No team was fielded in 1943 due to World War II.

== Schedule ==
Date	Opponent	Site	Result	Source
September 23	at Norwich*	Sabine Field; Northfield, VT	W 27–0	
September 30	Bates*	Gardner Dow Athletic Fields; Storrs, CT	L 0–6	
October 7	at Middlebury*	Middlebury, VT	W 13–7	
October 14	at Brooklyn*	Kingsmen Field; Brooklyn, NY	W 10–0	
October 21	CCNY*	Gardner Dow Athletic Fields; Storrs, CT	W 21–0	
October 28	Brooklyn*	Gardner Dow Athletic Fields; Storrs, CT	W 15–0	
November 4	at CCNY*	Lewisohn Stadium; New York, NY	W 52–0	
November 11	Norwich*	Gardner Dow Athletic Fields; Storrs, CT	W 14–0	
*Non-conference game
