= 1948 Heidelberg Student Princes football team =

American college football season

1948 Heidelberg Student Princes football

OAC champion
- Conference: Ohio Athletic Conference
- Record: 9–0 (7–0 OAC)
- Head coach: Paul Hoernemann (3rd season)

1948 Ohio Athletic Conference football standings
	Conf.					Overall
Team	W		L		T	W		L		T
Heidelberg $	7	–	0	–	0	9	–	0	–	0
Denison	6	–	0	–	0	8	–	0	–	0
Kent State	3	–	0	–	0	6	–	2	–	1
Ohio Wesleyan	2	–	0	–	0	6	–	2	–	0
Wilmington (OH)	1	–	0	–	0	5	–	3	–	1
Mount Union	6	–	2	–	0	6	–	3	–	0
Ohio Northern	2	–	2	–	0	5	–	3	–	1
Muskingum	3	–	3	–	1	3	–	4	–	1
Capital	3	–	4	–	0	4	–	4	–	0
Findlay	1	–	2	–	0	4	–	3	–	1
Marietta	1	–	2	–	0	4	–	4	–	0
Wooster	2	–	5	–	1	3	–	6	–	1
Oberlin	1	–	3	–	0	3	–	5	–	0
Akron	1	–	4	–	0	2	–	6	–	0
Wittenberg	1	–	6	–	0	1	–	7	–	0
Otterbein	0	–	4	–	0	2	–	6	–	1
Kenyon	0	–	3	–	0	1	–	6	–	1
$ – Conference champion

The 1948 Heidelberg Student Princes football team was an American football team that represented Heidelberg College as a member of the Ohio Athletic Conference (OAC) during the 1948 college football season. In their third year under head coach Paul Hoernemann, the Student Princes compiled a 9–0 record, won the OAC championship, shut out five of nine opponents, and outscored all opponents by a total of 299 to 26.

The 1948 season was the second perfect season in Heidelberg football history. Other perfect seasons were 1930, 1955, and 1972.

== Schedule ==
Date	Opponent	Site	Result	Attendance	Source
September 25	Ashland*	Tiffin, OH	W 23–0		
October 2	Muskingum	Tiffin, OH	W 21–8		
October 9	Capital	Tiffin, OH	W 51–6		
October 16	at Otterbein	Westerville, OH	W 19–6		
October 23	at Wittenberg	Springfield, OH	W 14–0		
October 30	Ohio Northern	Tiffin, OH	W 61–0		
November 6	at Wooster	Wooster, OH	W 7–6		
November 13	at Rio Grande*	Rio Grande, OH	W 69–0		
November 20	at Akron	Rubber Bowl; Akron, OH	W 34–0		
*Non-conference game
