= 1950 Kent State Golden Flashes football team =

American college football season

1950 Kent State Golden Flashes football
- Conference: Ohio Athletic Conference
- Record: 5–4 (2–1 OAC)
- Head coach: Trevor J. Rees (5th season)
- Home stadium: Memorial Stadium

1950 Ohio Athletic Conference football standings
	Conf.					Overall
Team	W		L		T	W		L		T
Muskingum $	6	–	0	–	0	7	–	1	–	0
Ohio Wesleyan	4	–	0	–	1	5	–	3	–	1
Oberlin	3	–	1	–	0	7	–	1	–	0
Heidelberg	3	–	1	–	0	7	–	2	–	0
Mount Union	3	–	1	–	0	6	–	2	–	0
Wittenberg	3	–	1	–	1	4	–	4	–	1
Kent State	2	–	1	–	0	5	–	4	–	0
Denison	3	–	3	–	0	4	–	4	–	0
Otterbein	2	–	4	–	0	3	–	5	–	0
Akron	1	–	3	–	0	2	–	7	–	0
Marietta	1	–	4	–	0	2	–	6	–	0
Wooster	0	–	6	–	0	1	–	6	–	1
Capital	0	–	6	–	0	0	–	8	–	0
$ – Conference champion

The 1950 Kent State Golden Flashes football team was an American football team that represented Kent State University in the Ohio Athletic Conference (OAC) during the 1950 college football season. In its fifth season under head coach Trevor J. Rees, Kent State compiled a 5–4 record. The season marked the opening of Memorial Stadium, which was built around the field where the team had been playing since 1941.

== Schedule ==
Date	Time	Opponent	Site	Result	Attendance	Source
September 22	8:00 p.m.	at Morris Harvey*	Charleston, WV	L 0–7		
September 29		at Mount Union	Alliance, OH	L 14–19		
October 7		at John Carroll*	Shaw Stadium; Cleveland, OH	L 7–48	6,200	
October 14		Marietta	Memorial Stadium; Kent, OH	W 57–0		
October 21		Ohio*	Memorial Stadium; Kent, OH	W 35–13		
October 27		Northern Illinois State*	Memorial Stadium; Kent, OH	W 56–7		
November 4		Bowling Green*	Memorial Stadium; Kent, OH (rivalry)	W 19–6		
November 11		at Akron	Akron, OH (Wagon Wheel)	W 19–7		
November 18		at New Hampshire*	Wildcat Stadium; Durham, NH	L 7–13	7,000	
*Non-conference game; All times are in Eastern time
