= 1946 Akron Zippers football team =

American college football season

1946 Akron Zippers football
- Conference: Ohio Athletic Conference
- Record: 5–4 (3–4 OAC)
- Head coach: Paul Baldacci (1st season)
- Home stadium: Rubber Bowl

1946 Ohio Athletic Conference football standings
	Conf.					Overall
Team	W		L		T	W		L		T
Otterbein $	5	–	0	–	0	7	–	1	–	0
Toledo	4	–	0	–	0	6	–	2	–	2
Muskingum	4	–	0	–	1	5	–	3	–	1
Oberlin	2	–	0	–	0	4	–	2	–	1
Baldwin–Wallace	4	–	1	–	0	4	–	2	–	2
Mount Union	5	–	1	–	1	7	–	1	–	1
Findlay	3	–	1	–	0	6	–	2	–	0
Marietta	3	–	1	–	0	3	–	4	–	0
Heidelberg	5	–	2	–	1	5	–	2	–	1
Kent State	1	–	1	–	0	6	–	2	–	0
Akron	3	–	4	–	0	5	–	4	–	0
Wittenberg	3	–	4	–	0	3	–	5	–	0
Ashland	2	–	3	–	1	2	–	5	–	1
Wooster	2	–	4	–	2	2	–	4	–	2
Denison	2	–	4	–	0	2	–	6	–	0
Case	1	–	4	–	0	2	–	7	–	0
John Carroll	1	–	4	–	0	1	–	7	–	0
Kenyon	1	–	5	–	0	1	–	7	–	0
Capital	1	–	6	–	0	1	–	6	–	0
Wilmington (OH)	0	–	2	–	0	0	–	5	–	0
Ohio Northern	0	–	6	–	0	3	–	6	–	0
$ – Conference champion

The 1946 Akron Zippers football team was an American football team that represented the University of Akron as a member of the Ohio Athletic Conference (OAC) during the 1946 college football season. In its first season under head coach Paul Baldacci, the team compiled an overall record of 5–4 record with a mark of 3–4 in conference play and was outscored by a total of 134 to 122. The team played its home games at the Rubber Bowl in Akron, Ohio.

The Akron football team had been suspended after the 1942 season due to World War II. The 1946 season marked the school's return to intercollegiate football.

== Schedule ==
Date	Opponent	Site	Result	Attendance	Source
September 28	Lawrence Tech*	Rubber Bowl; Akron, OH	W 31–12	6,250	
October 5	at Baldwin–Wallace	Berea, OH	L 0–32	7,000	
October 12	Case^{†}	Rubber Bowl; Akron, OH	W 13–0	1,978	
October 19	at Mount Union	Alliance, OH	L 7–12		
October 26	Toledo	Rubber Bowl; Akron, OH	L 13–33	6,875	
November 2	at Western Reserve*	Shaw Stadium; East Cleveland, OH	W 13–6		
November 9	Wooster	Rubber Bowl; Akron, OH	W 26–20		
November 15	Kent State	Rubber Bowl; Akron, OH (Wagon Wheel)	L 6–13	13,197	
November 23	John Carroll	Rubber Bowl; Akron, OH	W 13–6	2,600	
*Non-conference game; ^{†}Homecoming

== All-Conference ==
Player	Position
Joe Papp	End
