= John C. Evans =

American football and basketball player and coach

Biographical details
- Born: February 13, 1908; Ohio, U.S.
- Died: July 22, 1983 (aged 75); Burlington, Vermont, U.S.

Playing career

Football
- 1929–1931: Illinois

Basketball
- 1929–1930: Illinois
- Position: Halfback (football)

Coaching career (HC unless noted)

Football
- 1932–1936: Medina HS (NY)
- 1937–1939: Vermont (freshmen)
- 1940–1951: Vermont

Basketball
- 1937–1940: Vermont (freshmen)
- 1940–1965: Vermont

Head coaching record
- Overall: 260–196 (basketball)

John C. "Fuzzy" Evans (February 13, 1908 – July 22, 1983) was an American football and basketball player and coach. He served as the head basketball coach at the University of Vermont from 1940 to 1965. His 23 years at the helm of the Vermont Catamounts men's basketball program makes him the longest tenured basketball coach in school history, while his 260 career wins rank second all-time at Vermont. Evans was also the head football coach at Vermont from 1940 to 1951.

== Playing career ==
Evans was a standout football and basketball player at Stivers High School in Dayton, Ohio. He played both sports at the University of Illinois at Urbana–Champaign. His roommate at Illinois was James Reston, later a journalist for The New York Times. Both men were members of Sigma Pi fraternity.

== Coaching career ==
Evans graduated from Illinois in 1932 and began his coaching career that fall at Medina High School in Medina, New York.

Evans came to Vermont to serve as an assistant to fellow Illinois alum John P. Sabo. He was freshman football, basketball, and baseball coach until 1940, when the Vermont's athletic council declined to renew Sabo's contract and promoted Evans to succeed him as varsity football and men's basketball coach.

In his first three years as varsity basketball coach, Evans compiled a 29–16 record before the program went on hiatus due to World War II. Two years after the war was over, Vermont basketball enjoyed its best-ever season, winning the first-ever Yankee Conference men's basketball regular season title posting a school-record 19–3 mark, led by future UVM Hall of Famers Larry Killick and Bob Jake. The 19 wins represented the most victories by any Catamount basketball team until 2002. Killick and Jake were later drafted by the Baltimore Bullets in the 1947 BAA Draft. While at Vermont, Evans led the Catamounts to eight consecutive Vermont state titles (games between local state colleges and universities), including 30 straight victories at one stretch.

During his tenure, Evans coached future basketball coaches Rollie Massimino ('56) and Herb Brown ('57). Evans was also a teacher at UVM. He was inducted to the UVM Athletic Hall of Fame in 1973.

== Head coaching record ==
=== Football ===
Year	Team	Overall	Conference	Standing	Bowl/playoffs
Vermont Catamounts (Independent) (1940–1946)
1940	Vermont	4–4			
1941	Vermont	2–6			
1942	Vermont	4–3			
1943	No team—World War II				
1944	No team—World War II				
1945	No team—World War II				
1946	Vermont	2–3–2			
Vermont Catamounts (Yankee Conference) (1947–1951)
1947	Vermont	3–4–1	0–1–1	6th	
1948	Vermont	4–3–1	1–1	3rd	
1949	Vermont	6–2	2–0	NA	
1950	Vermont	2–5	0–3	T–5th	
1951	Vermont	0–7	0–3	6th	
Vermont:		27–37–4	3–8–1		
Total:		27–37–4			

=== Basketball ===
Record table
Season	Team	Overall	Conference	Standing	Postseason
Vermont Catamounts (Yankee Conference) (1940–1965)
1940–41	Vermont	9–5			
1941–42	Vermont	10–5			
1942–43	Vermont	10–6			
1943–44	No team—World War II				
1944–45	No team—World War II				
1945–46	Vermont	10–4			
1946–47	Vermont	19–3			
1947–48	Vermont	14–6			
1948–49	Vermont	15–5	2–1		
1949–50	Vermont	9–11	2–3		
1950–51	Vermont	14–6	4–1		
1951–52	Vermont	14–6	3–1		
1952–53	Vermont	11–10	1–2		
1953–54	Vermont	13–7	1–2		
1954–55	Vermont	6–15	4–1		
1955–56	Vermont	6–12	2–3		
1956–57	Vermont	15–5	3–2		
1957–58	Vermont	15–10	5–5		
1958–59	Vermont	12–10	4–6		
1959–60	Vermont	9–11	2–8		
1960–61	Vermont	9–11	3–7		
1961–62	Vermont	12–12	3–7		
1962–63	Vermont	10–13	2–8		
1963–64	Vermont	11–10	4–6		
1964–65	Vermont	7–13	1–9		
Vermont:		260–196	46–72		
Total:		260–196			
