= 1950 Southern Illinois Maroons football team =

American college football season

1950 Southern Illinois Maroons football
- Conference: Interstate Intercollegiate Athletic Conference
- Record: 3–5–1 (1–3–1 IIAC)
- Head coach: Bill Waller (1st season)
- Home stadium: McAndrew Stadium

1950 Interstate Intercollegiate Athletic Conference football standings
| | Conf. | | | | | Overall |
| Team | W | | L | | T | W | | L | | T |
|---|---|---|---|---|---|---|---|---|---|---|
| Illinois State Normal $ | 5 | – | 0 | – | 1 | 7 | – | 1 | – | 2 |
| Western Illinois | 4 | – | 1 | – | 0 | 7 | – | 1 | – | 0 |
| Central Michigan | 2 | – | 2 | – | 0 | 6 | – | 4 | – | 0 |
| Eastern Illinois | 2 | – | 2 | – | 0 | 5 | – | 3 | – | 0 |
| Northern Illinois State | 2 | – | 4 | – | 0 | 3 | – | 6 | – | 0 |
| Southern Illinois | 1 | – | 3 | – | 1 | 3 | – | 5 | – | 1 |
| Michigan State Normal | 0 | – | 4 | – | 0 | 3 | – | 6 | – | 0 |
$ – Conference champion

The 1950 Southern Illinois Maroons football team was an American football team that represented Southern Illinois University (now known as Southern Illinois University Carbondale) in the Interstate Intercollegiate Athletic Conference (IIAC) during the 1950 college football season. Under first-year head coach Bill Waller, the team compiled a 3–5–1 record. The team played its home games at McAndrew Stadium in Carbondale, Illinois.

== Schedule ==
| Date | Opponent | Site | Result | Attendance | Source |
|---|---|---|---|---|---|
| September 23 | at Hanover (IN)* | Hanover, IN | W 13–7 | | |
| September 30 | Southeast Missouri State* | McAndrew Stadium; Carbondale, IL | L 0–10 | | |
| October 7 | Indiana State* | McAndrew Stadium; Carbondale, IL | W 20–0 | | |
| October 14 | at Northern Illinois State | DeKalb Township High School Field; DeKalb, IL | L 20–44 | 6,000 | |
| October 21 | Illinois State Normal | McAndrew Stadium; Carbondale, IL | T 14–14 | | |
| October 28 | at Arkansas State* | Kays Stadium; Jonesboro, AR | L 0–46 | | |
| November 4 | at Eastern Illinois | Lincoln Field; Charleston, IL | L 7–21 | | |
| November 10 | Michigan State Normal | McAndrew Stadium; Carbondale, IL | W 44–13 | 2,500 | |
| November 18 | Western Illinois | McAndrew Stadium; Carbondale, IL | L 7–25 | | |
*Non-conference game
