= Herbert Snow (American football) =

American football coach (1904–1975)

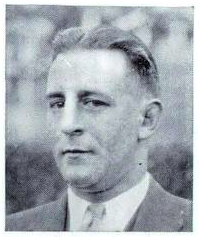
- Snow in 1934

Biographical details
- Born: c. 1904; Connecticut, U.S.
- Died: c. 1975 (aged 70–71)
- Education: Springfield College (1926)

Playing career
- 1922–1925: Springfield
- c. 1920s: New Britain Nutmegs
- Positions: Quarterback, fullback

Coaching career (HC unless noted)
- 1926: Lynbrook HS (NY)
- 1927–1930: Adelphi Academy (NY) (backfield)
- 1931–1943: Wellesley HS (MA) (assistant)
- 1944: New Hampshire

Administrative career (AD unless noted)
- 1931–1944: Wellesley HS (MA)

Head coaching record
- Overall: 1–3 (college)

Accomplishments and honors

Championships
- 1 New England (1944)

Herbert H. Snow (c. 1904 – 1975) was an American college and high school football coach. He was the head football coach for the University of New Hampshire in 1944.

== Playing career ==
From 1922 to 1925, Snow was a member of the Springfield football team as a quarterback and a fullback. Following his graduation in 1926, he played for the New Britain Nutmegs, a semi-professional team in the New England League.

== Coaching career ==
In 1926, Snow spent a year as the head football coach for Lynbrook High School in Lynbrook, New York. From 1927 to 1929, he was the backfield coach for Adelphi Academy.

In 1931, Snow was hired as the athletic director and assistant football coach for Wellesley High School.

In 1944, after 14 years with Wellesley, Snow was hired as the head football coach for the University of New Hampshire. Snow was hired to coach the "informal" 1944 season, which only featured approximately 35 players at the time of his hiring.

== Personal life ==
Snow died in 1975.

== Head coaching record ==
=== College ===
Year	Team	Overall	Conference	Standing	Bowl/playoffs
New Hampshire Wildcats (New England Conference) (1944)
1944	New Hampshire	1–3	1–1	T–1st	
New Hampshire:		1–3	1–1		
Total:		1–3			
National championship Conference title Conference division title or championship game berth
