= 1946 Kent State Golden Flashes football team =

American college football season

1946 Kent State Golden Flashes football
- Conference: Ohio Athletic Conference
- Record: 6–2 (1–1 OAC)
- Head coach: Trevor J. Rees (1st season)
- Home stadium: Memorial Stadium

1946 Ohio Athletic Conference football standings
| | Conf. | | | | | Overall |
| Team | W | | L | | T | W | | L | | T |
|---|---|---|---|---|---|---|---|---|---|---|
| Otterbein $ | 5 | – | 0 | – | 0 | 7 | – | 1 | – | 0 |
| Toledo | 4 | – | 0 | – | 0 | 6 | – | 2 | – | 2 |
| Muskingum | 4 | – | 0 | – | 1 | 5 | – | 3 | – | 1 |
| Oberlin | 2 | – | 0 | – | 0 | 4 | – | 2 | – | 1 |
| Baldwin–Wallace | 4 | – | 1 | – | 0 | 4 | – | 2 | – | 2 |
| Mount Union | 5 | – | 1 | – | 1 | 7 | – | 1 | – | 1 |
| Findlay | 3 | – | 1 | – | 0 | 6 | – | 2 | – | 0 |
| Marietta | 3 | – | 1 | – | 0 | 3 | – | 4 | – | 0 |
| Heidelberg | 5 | – | 2 | – | 1 | 5 | – | 2 | – | 1 |
| Kent State | 1 | – | 1 | – | 0 | 6 | – | 2 | – | 0 |
| Akron | 3 | – | 4 | – | 0 | 5 | – | 4 | – | 0 |
| Wittenberg | 3 | – | 4 | – | 0 | 3 | – | 5 | – | 0 |
| Ashland | 2 | – | 3 | – | 1 | 2 | – | 5 | – | 1 |
| Wooster | 2 | – | 4 | – | 2 | 2 | – | 4 | – | 2 |
| Denison | 2 | – | 4 | – | 0 | 2 | – | 6 | – | 0 |
| Case | 1 | – | 4 | – | 0 | 2 | – | 7 | – | 0 |
| John Carroll | 1 | – | 4 | – | 0 | 1 | – | 7 | – | 0 |
| Kenyon | 1 | – | 5 | – | 0 | 1 | – | 7 | – | 0 |
| Capital | 1 | – | 6 | – | 0 | 1 | – | 6 | – | 0 |
| Wilmington (OH) | 0 | – | 2 | – | 0 | 0 | – | 5 | – | 0 |
| Ohio Northern | 0 | – | 6 | – | 0 | 3 | – | 6 | – | 0 |
$ – Conference champion

The 1946 Kent State Golden Flashes football team was an American football team that represented Kent State University in the Ohio Athletic Conference (OAC) during the 1946 college football season. In its first season under head coach Trevor J. Rees, Kent State compiled a 6–2 record.

Kent State ranked fourth nationally among small-college teams with an average of 349.1 yards per game in total offense. It also ranked fourth nationally in total defense, giving up an average of only 115.1 yards per game.

== Schedule ==
| Date | Opponent | Site | Result | Attendance | Source |
|---|---|---|---|---|---|
| September 28 | at Hiram* | Memorial Stadium; Kent, OH | W 40–0 | | |
| October 5 | at John Carroll | Cleveland, OH | W 20–7 | | |
| October 12 | Bluffton* | Memorial Stadium; Kent, OH | W 39–0 | | |
| October 19 | Bowling Green^{†} | Memorial Stadium; Kent, OH (rivalry) | L 0–13 | 8,500 | |
| October 26 | at Baldwin–Wallace | Berea, OH | L 12–21 | | |
| November 1 | at Kalamazoo* | Kalamazoo, MI | W 12–0 | | |
| November 9 | vs. Ohio Wesleyan* | Athens, OH | W 7–0 | | |
| November 15 | at Akron* | Rubber Bowl; Akron, OH (Wagon Wheel) | W 13–6 | 13,197 | |
*Non-conference game; ^{†}Homecoming
