= 1950 Eastern Illinois Panthers football team =

American college football season

1950 Eastern Illinois Panthers football
- Conference: Interstate Intercollegiate Athletic Conference
- Record: 5–3 (2–2 IIAC)
- Head coach: Maynard O'Brien (5th season)
- Home stadium: Lincoln Field

1950 Interstate Intercollegiate Athletic Conference football standings
| | Conf. | | | | | Overall |
| Team | W | | L | | T | W | | L | | T |
|---|---|---|---|---|---|---|---|---|---|---|
| Illinois State Normal $ | 5 | – | 0 | – | 1 | 7 | – | 1 | – | 2 |
| Western Illinois | 4 | – | 1 | – | 0 | 7 | – | 1 | – | 0 |
| Central Michigan | 2 | – | 2 | – | 0 | 6 | – | 4 | – | 0 |
| Eastern Illinois | 2 | – | 2 | – | 0 | 5 | – | 3 | – | 0 |
| Northern Illinois State | 2 | – | 4 | – | 0 | 3 | – | 6 | – | 0 |
| Southern Illinois | 1 | – | 3 | – | 1 | 3 | – | 5 | – | 1 |
| Michigan State Normal | 0 | – | 4 | – | 0 | 3 | – | 6 | – | 0 |
$ – Conference champion

The 1950 Eastern Illinois Panthers football team represented Eastern Illinois State College (now known as Eastern Illinois University) as a member of the Interstate Intercollegiate Athletic Conference (IIAC) during the 1950 college football season. The team was led by fifth-year head coach Maynard O'Brien and played their home games at Lincoln Field in Charleston, Illinois. The Panthers finished the season with a 5–3 record overall and a 2–2 record in conference play, tying for third place in the IIAC.

== Schedule ==
| Date | Opponent | Site | Result | Attendance | Source |
|---|---|---|---|---|---|
| September 23 | Ball State* | Lincoln Field; Charleston, IL | W 35–6 | | |
| September 30 | at Quincy* | Q Stadium; Quincy, IL | W 28–25 | | |
| October 7 | at Emporia State* | Welch Stadium; Emporia, KS | L 0–18 | 5,000 | |
| October 14 | at Illinois State Normal | McCormick Field; Normal, IL (rivalry) | L 21–23 | | |
| October 28 | at Indiana State* | Memorial Stadium; Terre Haute, IN | W 47–0 | | |
| November 4 | Southern Illinois^{†} | Lincoln Field; Charleston, IL | W 21–7 | | |
| November 11 | at Western Illinois | Hanson Field; Macomb, IL | L 0–13 | | |
| November 18 | Northern Illinois State | Lincoln Field; Charleston, IL | W 34–13 | | |
*Non-conference game; ^{†}Homecoming
