= 1946 Toledo Rockets football team =

American college football season

1946 Toledo Rockets football

Glass Bowl champion

Glass Bowl, W 21–12 vs. Bates
- Conference: Ohio Athletic Conference
- Record: 6–2–2 (4–0 OAC)
- Head coach: Bill Orwig (1st season)
- Captain: Bill Gall
- Home stadium: Glass Bowl

1946 Ohio Athletic Conference football standings
	Conf.					Overall
Team	W		L		T	W		L		T
Otterbein $	5	–	0	–	0	7	–	1	–	0
Toledo	4	–	0	–	0	6	–	2	–	2
Muskingum	4	–	0	–	1	5	–	3	–	1
Oberlin	2	–	0	–	0	4	–	2	–	1
Baldwin–Wallace	4	–	1	–	0	4	–	2	–	2
Mount Union	5	–	1	–	1	7	–	1	–	1
Findlay	3	–	1	–	0	6	–	2	–	0
Marietta	3	–	1	–	0	3	–	4	–	0
Heidelberg	5	–	2	–	1	5	–	2	–	1
Kent State	1	–	1	–	0	6	–	2	–	0
Akron	3	–	4	–	0	5	–	4	–	0
Wittenberg	3	–	4	–	0	3	–	5	–	0
Ashland	2	–	3	–	1	2	–	5	–	1
Wooster	2	–	4	–	2	2	–	4	–	2
Denison	2	–	4	–	0	2	–	6	–	0
Case	1	–	4	–	0	2	–	7	–	0
John Carroll	1	–	4	–	0	1	–	7	–	0
Kenyon	1	–	5	–	0	1	–	7	–	0
Capital	1	–	6	–	0	1	–	6	–	0
Wilmington (OH)	0	–	2	–	0	0	–	5	–	0
Ohio Northern	0	–	6	–	0	3	–	6	–	0
$ – Conference champion

The 1946 Toledo Rockets football team was an American football team that represented Toledo University as a member of the Ohio Athletic Conference (OAC) during the 1946 college football season. In their first season under head coach Bill Orwig, the Rockets compiled a 6–2–2 record, outscored their opponents by a combined total of 200 to 132, and defeated Bates, 21–12, in the first postseason Glass Bowl game.

The 1946 season was the first for the Toledo Rockets since 1942. In 1946, the University of Toledo rebuilt University Stadium using glass blocks throughout the stadium, installing lights for night games and a glass electric scoreboard, and building a two-level press box out of blue vitrolite and glass blocks. The renovated stadium was named the Glass Bowl with the dedication game being played on December 7, 1946, against Bates. The Toledo team captain in 1946 was Bill Gall.

== Schedule ==
Date	Opponent	Site	Result	Attendance	Source
September 28	Western Reserve*	Glass Bowl; Toledo, OH	T 14–14		
October 5	Case Tech	Glass Bowl; Toledo, OH	W 42–14		
October 12	at Marshall*	Fairfield Stadium; Huntington, WV	T 14–14		
October 19	Dayton*	Glass Bowl; Toledo, OH	L 13–20	14,000	
October 26	at Akron	Rubber Bowl; Akron, OH	W 33–19	6,875	
November 2	John Carroll	Glass Bowl; Toledo, OH	W 28–19		
November 11	Wayne*	Glass Bowl; Toledo, OH	W 14–6	10,000	
November 16	at Baldwin-Wallace	Berea, OH	W 14–7	4,500	
November 23	at Wichita*	Cessna Stadium; Wichita, KS	L 7–13	7,000	
December 7	Bates*	Glass Bowl; Toledo, OH (Glass Bowl)	W 21–12	12,000	
*Non-conference game
