= 1950 Western Illinois Leathernecks football team =

American college football season

1950 Western Illinois Leathernecks football
- Conference: Interstate Intercollegiate Athletic Conference
- Record: 7–1 (4–1 IIAC)
- Head coach: Vince DiFrancesca (2nd season)
- Home stadium: Hanson Field

1950 Interstate Intercollegiate Athletic Conference football standings
	Conf.					Overall
Team	W		L		T	W		L		T
Illinois State Normal $	5	–	0	–	1	7	–	1	–	2
Western Illinois	4	–	1	–	0	7	–	1	–	0
Central Michigan	2	–	2	–	0	6	–	4	–	0
Eastern Illinois	2	–	2	–	0	5	–	3	–	0
Northern Illinois State	2	–	4	–	0	3	–	6	–	0
Southern Illinois	1	–	3	–	1	3	–	5	–	1
Michigan State Normal	0	–	4	–	0	3	–	6	–	0
$ – Conference champion

The 1950 Western Illinois Leathernecks football team represented Western Illinois University as a member of the Interstate Intercollegiate Athletic Conference (IIAC) during the 1950 college football season. They were led by second-year head coach Vince DiFrancesca and played their home games at Hanson Field, which opened at the beginning of the season. The Leathernecks finished the season with a 7–1 record overall and a 4–1 record in conference play, placing second in the IIAC.

== Schedule ==
Date	Opponent	Site	Result	Attendance	Source
September 23	Central Michigan	Hanson Field; Macomb, IL	W 28–7		
October 7	at Wayne*	University of Detroit Stadium; Detroit, MI	W 21–20	7,767	
October 13	at Quincy*	Q Stadium; Quincy, IL	W 39–7		
October 21	Northern Illinois State	Hanson Field; Macomb, IL	W 28–27		
October 28	at Illinois State Normal	McCormick Field; Normal, IL	L 20–21	6,000	
November 3	Dubuque*	Hanson Field; Macomb, IL	W 51–7		
November 11	Eastern Illinois	Hanson Field; Macomb, IL	W 13–0		
November 18	at Southern Illinois	McAndrew Stadium; Carbondale, IL	W 25–7		
*Non-conference game
