= Edmund L. Coombs =

American coach and athletic director (1919–1986)

Biographical details
- Born: September 23, 1919; Boothbay Harbor, Maine, U.S.
- Died: February 7, 1986 (aged 66); Brunswick, Maine, U.S.

Coaching career (HC unless noted)

Men's basketball
- 1950–1957: Bowdoin

Baseball
- 1969–1979: Bowdoin

Administrative career (AD unless noted)
- 1971–1981: Bowdoin

Head coaching record
- Overall: 52–82 (Men's basketball); 60–127 (Baseball)

Edmund Lawrence Coombs (September 23, 1919 – February 7, 1986) was an American coach and administrator who was the athletic director and head men's basketball and baseball coach at Bowdoin College.

== Early life ==
A native of Boothbay Harbor, Maine, Coombs prepared for college at Boothbay Harbor High School and Hebron Academy. He was a three sport athlete (football, basketball, and baseball) at Hebron and was the third ranking student in the class of 1938, which also included Amo Bessone. He attended Bowdoin College, where he played catcher for the Polar Bears' baseball team and halfback on the football team. He was captain of Bowdoin's 1942 baseball team. Coombs graduated in the fall of 1942 and entered the United States Marine Corps. He was a First lieutenant with the 3rd Marine Division and participated in island invasions in the Pacific War. He was wounded in action and discharged in October 1945.

== Career ==
In 1945, Coombs coached Bowdoin's informal football team. He was an assistant football coach in 1946 and joined the athletic staff full-time the following year as an assistant football and baseball coach. He later served as the freshman basketball coach and in 1950, succeeded Dinny Shay as varsity coach. In seven seasons, he compiled a 52–82 record. In 1957, he returned to the freshman team and was replaced by former Boston Celtics player Bob Donham.

In 1969, Bowdoin's baseball coach Danny MacFayden was granted indefinite sick leave and Coombs succeeded him as varsity baseball coach. In 1971, he took over as acting athletic director following the resignation of Daniel K. Stuckey. He was given the AD's job the following June. He resigned as baseball coach prior to the 1980 season. His record over eleven seasons was 60–127. In February 1981, Coombs announced that he would retire effective September 30. Coombs died February 7, 1986 at a hospital in Brunswick, Maine.
