= William Houghton (American football) =

American football coach

Biographical details
- Born: November 14, 1908; Mingo Junction, Ohio, U.S.
- Died: October 18, 2001 (aged 92); Sedona, Arizona, U.S.

Coaching career (HC unless noted)
- 1933–1940: Massillon Wash. HS (OH) (asst)
- 1941: Massillon Wash. HS (OH)
- 1948–1951: Akron

Head coaching record
- Overall: 7–27–1 (college)

William G. "Bud" Houghton (November 14, 1908 – October 18, 2001) was an American football coach in Ohio. He served as the head football coach at the University of Akron from 1948 to 1951, compiling a record of 7–27–1. Houghton graduated from Ohio Wesleyan University in 1933. He was an assistant football coach under Paul Brown at Massillon Washington High School in Massillon, Ohio and succeeded him as head coach when Brown moved to Ohio State University in 1941. Upon resigning as football coach at Akron in 1951, Houghton noted his "poor record" and business opportunities.

== Head coaching record ==
Year	Team	Overall	Conference	Standing	Bowl/playoffs
Akron Zippers/Zips (Ohio Athletic Conference) (1948–1951)
1948	Akron	2–6	1–4	13th	
1949	Akron	2–6–1	0–3–1	12th	
1950	Akron	2–7	1–3	10th	
1951	Akron	1–8	1–3	9th	
Akron:		7–27–1	3–13–1		
Total:		7–27–1			
