= 1948 Akron Zippers football team =

American college football season

1948 Akron Zippers football
- Conference: Ohio Athletic Conference
- Record: 2–6 (1–4 OAC)
- Head coach: William Houghton (1st season)
- Captain: Ed Kirkpatrick
- Home stadium: Rubber Bowl

1948 Ohio Athletic Conference football standings
	Conf.					Overall
Team	W		L		T	W		L		T
Heidelberg $	7	–	0	–	0	9	–	0	–	0
Denison	6	–	0	–	0	8	–	0	–	0
Kent State	3	–	0	–	0	6	–	2	–	1
Ohio Wesleyan	2	–	0	–	0	6	–	2	–	0
Wilmington (OH)	1	–	0	–	0	5	–	3	–	1
Mount Union	6	–	2	–	0	6	–	3	–	0
Ohio Northern	2	–	2	–	0	5	–	3	–	1
Muskingum	3	–	3	–	1	3	–	4	–	1
Capital	3	–	4	–	0	4	–	4	–	0
Findlay	1	–	2	–	0	4	–	3	–	1
Marietta	1	–	2	–	0	4	–	4	–	0
Wooster	2	–	5	–	1	3	–	6	–	1
Oberlin	1	–	3	–	0	3	–	5	–	0
Akron	1	–	4	–	0	2	–	6	–	0
Wittenberg	1	–	6	–	0	1	–	7	–	0
Otterbein	0	–	4	–	0	2	–	6	–	1
Kenyon	0	–	3	–	0	1	–	6	–	1
$ – Conference champion

The 1948 Akron Zippers football team was an American football team that represented the University of Akron in the Ohio Athletic Conference (OAC) during the 1948 college football season. In its first season under head coach William Houghton, the team compiled a 2–6 record (1-4 against OAC opponents) and was outscored by a total of 146 to 46. Ed Kirkpatrick was the team captain. The team played its home games at the Rubber Bowl in Akron, Ohio.

== Schedule ==
Date	Opponent	Site	Result	Attendance	Source
September 25	at Findlay*	Findlay, OH	W 14–9	4,500	
October 2	at Baldwin–Wallace*	Berea, OH	L 0–13	6,000	
October 9	at Muskingum	New Concord, OH	L 12–21		
October 16	Louisville*	Rubber Bowl; Akron, OH	L 0–13		
October 23	at Mount Union	Alliance, OH	L 0–19	5,000	
October 30	Wooster	Rubber Bowl; Akron, OH	W 20–6		
November 12	Kent State	Rubber Bowl; Akron, OH(Wagon Wheel)	L 0–31		
November 20	Heidelberg	Rubber Bowl; Akron, OH	L 0–34		
*Non-conference game
