= 1950 Illinois State Normal Redbirds football team =

American college football season

1950 Illinois State Normal Redbirds football

IIAC champion

Corn Bowl, L 6–7 vs. Missouri Mines
- Conference: Interstate Intercollegiate Athletic Conference
- Record: 7–1–2 (5–0–1 IIAC)
- Head coach: Edwin Struck (6th season)
- MVP: Dean Burridge
- Captains: Dean Burridge; Ralph Lesnick
- Home stadium: McCormick Field

1950 Interstate Intercollegiate Athletic Conference football standings
	Conf.					Overall
Team	W		L		T	W		L		T
Illinois State Normal $	5	–	0	–	1	7	–	1	–	2
Western Illinois	4	–	1	–	0	7	–	1	–	0
Central Michigan	2	–	2	–	0	6	–	4	–	0
Eastern Illinois	2	–	2	–	0	5	–	3	–	0
Northern Illinois State	2	–	4	–	0	3	–	6	–	0
Southern Illinois	1	–	3	–	1	3	–	5	–	1
Michigan State Normal	0	–	4	–	0	3	–	6	–	0
$ – Conference champion

The 1950 Illinois State Normal Redbirds football team represented Illinois State Normal University—now known as Illinois State University—as a member of the Interstate Intercollegiate Athletic Conference (IIAC) during the 1950 college football season. Led by sixth-year head coach Edwin Struck, the Redbirds compiled an overall record of 7–1–2 with a mark of 5–0–1 in conference play, winning the IIAC. Illinois State Normal lost to Missouri Mines in the postseason Corn Bowl. The team played home games at McCormick Field in Normal, Illinois.

== Schedule ==
Date	Opponent	Site	Result	Attendance	Source
September 23	at Indiana State*	Memorial Stadium; Terre Haute, IN	T 0–0		
September 30	Millikin*	McCormick Field; Normal, IL	W 28–0		
October 7	at Central Michigan	Alumni Field; Mount Pleasant, MI	W 14–13	3,000	
October 14	Eastern Illinois	McCormick Field; Normal, IL (rivalry)	W 23–21		
October 21	at Southern Illinois	McAndrew Stadium; Carbondale, IL	T 14–14		
October 28	Western Illinois^{†}	McCormick Field; Normal, IL	W 21–20	6,000	
November 4	Michigan State Normal	McCormick Field; Normal, IL	W 14–0		
November 11	at Northern Illinois State	DeKalb Township High School Field; DeKalb, IL	W 13–12		
November 18	at Illinois Wesleyan*	Wesleyan Field; Bloomington, IL	W 21–6	5,500	
November 23	vs. Missouri Mines*	Wesleyan Field; Bloomington, IL (Corn Bowl)	L 6–7	2,500	
*Non-conference game; ^{†}Homecoming
