= 1972 Heidelberg Student Princes football team =

American college football season

1972 Heidelberg Student Princes football

OAC champion OAC Red Division champion Stagg Bowl champion

OAC Championship Game, W 24–0 vs. Muskingum

Amos Alonzo Stagg Bowl, W 28–16 vs. Fort Valley State
- Conference: Ohio Athletic Conference
- Red Division
- Record: 11–0 (5–0 OAC)
- Head coach: Armin Riesen (2nd season)

1972 Ohio Athletic Conference football standings
	Conf.					Overall
Team	W		L		T	W		L		T
Blue Division
Muskingum xy	4	–	0	–	0	5	–	5	–	0
Denison	2	–	1	–	1	7	–	1	–	1
Ohio Wesleyan	1	–	2	–	1	3	–	5	–	1
Marietta	1	–	3	–	0	4	–	5	–	0
Otterbein	1	–	3	–	0	2	–	7	–	0
Red Division
Heidelberg xy$	5	–	0	–	0	11	–	0	–	0
Baldwin–Wallace	3	–	2	–	0	7	–	2	–	0
Wittenberg	3	–	2	–	0	5	–	4	–	0
Capital	3	–	2	–	0	4	–	5	–	0
Wooster	1	–	4	–	0	2	–	6	–	0
Mount Union	0	–	5	–	0	1	–	8	–	0
Not competing for championship
Kenyon			–			7	–	0	–	1
Oberlin			–			2	–	7	–	0
Championship: Heidelberg 24, Muskingum 0
$ – Conference champion; x – Division champion/co-champions; y – Championship game participant

The 1972 Heidelberg Student Princes football team was an American football team that represented Heidelberg College as a member of the Red Division of the Ohio Athletic Conference (OAC) during the 1972 NCAA College Division football season. In their second year under head coach Armin Riesen, the Student Princes compiled a 9–0 record in the regular season and then defeated Muskingum in the first OAC Championship Game and Fort Valley State in the Amos Alonzo Stagg Bowl. They outscored opponents by a total of 317 to 106.

The team's statistical leaders included junior quarterback Jim Ruth with 1,742 passing yards and junior fullback Bob Hunt with 888 rushing yards and 54 points scored.

The 1972 season was one of four perfect seasons in Heidelberg football history, the others being in 1930, 1948, and 1955.

== Schedule ==
Date	Opponent	Site	Result	Attendance	Source
September 16	at Ohio Wesleyan*	Delaware, OH	W 14–3	3,000	
September 23	Otterbein*	Tiffin, OH	W 69–13	3,500	
September 30	at Muskingum*	New Concord, OH	W 34–14	3,000	
October 7	at Marietta*	Marietta, OH	W 34–9	3,000	
October 14	Capital	Tiffin, OH	W 42–16	4,000	
October 21	Baldwin–Wallace	Tiffin, OH	W 10–7	4,500	
October 28	at Wooster	Wooster, OH	W 31–21	3,000	
November 4	Wittenberg	Tiffin, OH	W 7–0	4,500	
November 11	at Mount Union	Alliance, OH	W 24–7	3,000	
November 18	at Muskingum*	Tiffin, OH (OAC Championship Game)	W 24–0		
November 24	vs. Fort Valley State*	Municipal Stadium; Phenix City, AL (Amos Alonzo Stagg Bowl)	W 28–16	4,500	
*Non-conference game
