= 1950 Michigan State Normal Hurons football team =

American college football season

1950 Michigan State Normal Hurons football
- Conference: Interstate Intercollegiate Athletic Conference
- Record: 3–6 (0–4 IIAC)
- Head coach: Harry Ockerman (2nd season)
- Captain: James R. Wichterman
- Home stadium: Briggs Field

1950 Interstate Intercollegiate Athletic Conference football standings
	Conf.					Overall
Team	W		L		T	W		L		T
Illinois State Normal $	5	–	0	–	1	7	–	1	–	2
Western Illinois	4	–	1	–	0	7	–	1	–	0
Central Michigan	2	–	2	–	0	6	–	4	–	0
Eastern Illinois	2	–	2	–	0	5	–	3	–	0
Northern Illinois State	2	–	4	–	0	3	–	6	–	0
Southern Illinois	1	–	3	–	1	3	–	5	–	1
Michigan State Normal	0	–	4	–	0	3	–	6	–	0
$ – Conference champion

The 1950 Michigan State Normal Hurons football team represented Michigan State Normal College (later renamed Eastern Michigan University) in the Interstate Intercollegiate Athletic Conference (IIAC) during the 1950 college football season. In their second season under head coach Harry Ockerman, the Hurons compiled a 3–6 record (0–4 against IIAC opponents) and were outscored by their opponents, 194 to 123. Dr. James R. Wichterman was the team captain. Harry Mail was selected as a first-team player on the All-IIAC team.

== Schedule ==
Date	Opponent	Site	Result	Attendance	Source
September 22	at Hope*	Holland, MI	W 19–6		
September 30	at Akron*	Rubber Bowl; Akron, OH	L 7–40	4,000	
October 7	Northern Illinois State	Briggs Field; Ypsilanti, MI	L 13–35		
October 14	Wayne*	Briggs Field; Ypsilanti, MI	L 6–26	5,000	
October 21	at Ball State*	Ball State Field; Muncie, IN	W 13–0		
October 28	Central Michigan^{†}	Briggs Field; Ypsilanti, MI (rivalry)	L 7–26		
November 4	at Illinois State Normal	McCormick Field; Normal, IL	L 0–14		
November 10	at Southern Illinois	McAndrew Stadium; Carbondale, IL	L 13–44	2,500	
November 17	Northern Michigan*	Briggs Field; Ypsilanti, MI	W 45–0		
*Non-conference game; ^{†}Homecoming

== See also ==
- 1950 in Michigan
