= Bill Waller (American football) =

American football player and coach (1911–2007)

Biographical details
- Born: December 16, 1911; Thompsonville, Illinois, U.S.
- Died: September 25, 2007 (aged 95)

Playing career
- 1934: Illinois
- 1938: Brooklyn Dodgers
- Position: End

Coaching career (HC unless noted)
- 1949: Yakima Valley
- 1950–1951: Southern Illinois

Head coaching record
- Overall: 3–14–1 (college)

William Howell Waller (December 16, 1911 – September 25, 2007) was an American football player and coach. He was the sixth head coach at Southern Illinois University Carbondale for two seasons, 1950 and 1951, and compiled a record of 3–14–1.

== Head coaching record ==
=== College ===
Year	Team	Overall	Conference	Standing	Bowl/playoffs
Southern Illinois Maroons/Salukis (Interstate Intercollegiate Athletic Conference) (1950–1951)
1950	Southern Illinois	3–5–1	1–3–1	6th	
1951	Southern Illinois	0–9	0–6	7th	
Southern Illinois:		3–14–1	19–1		
Total:		3–14–1			
