= Paul Hoernemann =

American football and basketball coach

Biographical details
- Born: May 18, 1916; Lima, Ohio, U.S.
- Died: February 28, 1965 (aged 48); Strongsville, Ohio, U.S.

Coaching career (HC unless noted)

Football
- 1946–1959: Heidelberg

Basketball
- 1946–1955: Heidelberg

Head coaching record
- Overall: 102–18–4 (college football); 90–77 (college basketball)

Accomplishments and honors

Championships
- Football; 5 OAC (1948, 1952, 1954, 1956, 1959)
- College Football Hall of Fame; Inducted in 1997 (profile)

Paul Heusser Hoernemann (May 18, 1916 – February 28, 1965) was an American football and basketball coach. He served as head football coach at Heidelberg College—now known as Heidelberg University— in Tiffin, Ohio from 1946 to 1959, compiling a record of 102–18–4 and winning five Ohio Athletic Conference (OAC) titles. Hoernemann was also the head basketball coach at Heidelberg from 1946 to 1955, tallying a mark of 90–77.

Hoernemann arrived at Heidelberg from New Philadelphia High School, where he had a 24–3 record. After the 1959 season, Hoernemann became a vice president at Heidelberg. He held this position until his death in 1965. In 1966, the new dining hall at Heidelberg was named the Hoernemann Refectory. He was inducted into the Ohio High School Coaches Association Hall of Fame in 1994 and the College Football Hall of Fame in 1997.

== Head coaching record ==
=== College football ===
Year	Team	Overall	Conference	Standing	Bowl/playoffs
Heidelberg Student Princes (Ohio Athletic Conference) (1946–1959)
1946	Heidelberg	5–2–1	5–2–1	9th	
1947	Heidelberg	7–1	6–1	3rd	
1948	Heidelberg	9–0	7–0	1st	
1949	Heidelberg	8–1	4–1	4th	
1950	Heidelberg	7–2	3–1	T–3rd	
1951	Heidelberg	7–1–1	3–0–1	2nd	
1952	Heidelberg	8–1	5–1	1st	
1953	Heidelberg	7–1–1	4–1–1	2nd	
1954	Heidelberg	7–1–1	5–0–1	1st	
1955	Heidelberg	9–0	5–0	2nd	
1956	Heidelberg	8–1	5–1	1st	
1957	Heidelberg	7–2	4–2	T–5th	
1958	Heidelberg	6–3	3–3	T–6th	
1959	Heidelberg	7–2	5–1	T–1st	
Heidelberg:		102–18–4	64–14–4		
Total:		102–18–4			
National championship Conference title Conference division title or championship game berth
