= Dinny Shay =

American football player and coach (1906–1970)

Biographical details
- Born: September 7, 1906; Hartford, Connecticut, U.S.
- Died: July 21, 1970 (aged 63); Hartford, Connecticut, U.S.

Playing career
- 1927–1929: Notre Dame
- 1932: Paterson Night Hawks
- Position: Defensive back/Fullback

Coaching career (HC unless noted)

Football
- 1930: La Salle Academy (MD)
- 1931: Manhattan (assistant)
- 1932–1935: Wethersfield State Prison
- 1936–1942: Bowdoin (assistant)
- 1946: Bowdoin
- 1947–1950: Bowdoin (assistant)

Men's basketball
- 1941–1942: Bowdoin
- 1945–1947: Bowdoin (assistant)
- 1947–1950: Bowdoin

Head coaching record
- Overall: 12–41 (Men's basketball); 2–4 (Football)

Accomplishments and honors

Championships
- 1929 college football national champion

George Daniel "Dinny" Shay (September 7, 1906 – July 21, 1970) was an American football player and coach who played for the Notre Dame Fighting Irish football team and was head coach of the Bowdoin Polar Bears football and basketball teams.

== Playing ==
Shay was born on September 7, 1906 in Hartford, Connecticut. He played football at Hartford Public High School.

Shay was a varsity fullback on the Notre Dame Fighting Irish football team from 1927 to 1929. The 1929 Notre Dame Fighting Irish football team finished the year was the top-ranked team under the Dickinson System and was selected as that year's national champion by Billingsley Report, Boand System, Dickinson System, Dunkel System, College Football Researchers Association, Helms Athletic Foundation, National Championship Foundation, Poling System, and Jeff Sagarin's ELO-Chess system.

Shay was a fair offensive player, but stood out on defense, with Notre Dame's 1929 Official Football Review describing him as "one of the greatest defensive backs of Notre Dame history". He played one season (1932) of professional football with the Paterson Night Hawks of the Eastern Football League.

== Coaching ==
Shay graduated from Notre Dame in 1930 began his coaching career that fall at the La Salle Academy in Cumberland, Maryland. The following season, he was an assistant under former Notre Dame teammate John B. Law at Manhattan College. From 1932 to 1935, he was athletic director of the Hartford park department and coach the football team at Wethersfield State Prison.

In 1936, Shay was hired as an assistant football coach at Bowdoin College. When the school's basketball program was launched in 1941, Shay became the team's head coach.

From 1942 to 1945, Shay served in the United States Navy. On October 6, 1945, he was named head football coach while Adam Walsh was granted a leave of absence to coach the Cleveland Rams of the National Football League. As Shay was still on active duty, Edmund L. Coombs coached Bowdoin's informal 1945 team and Shay took over in 1946. Shay returned to Bowdoin following his discharge in November 1945. He was an assistant to basketball coach Neil Mahoney that winter. Walsh's leave ended in 1947 and Shay returned to his assistant position. Shay resigned from the Bowdoin athletic staff in November 1950.

== Later life ==
Shay left Bowdoin for a position with United Aircraft. He spent 19 years with their Pratt & Whitney division in East Hartford, Connecticut. He coached Pratt & Whitney's football team. Shay died on July 21, 1970.
