= 1944 New Hampshire Wildcats football team =

American college football season

1944 New Hampshire Wildcats football
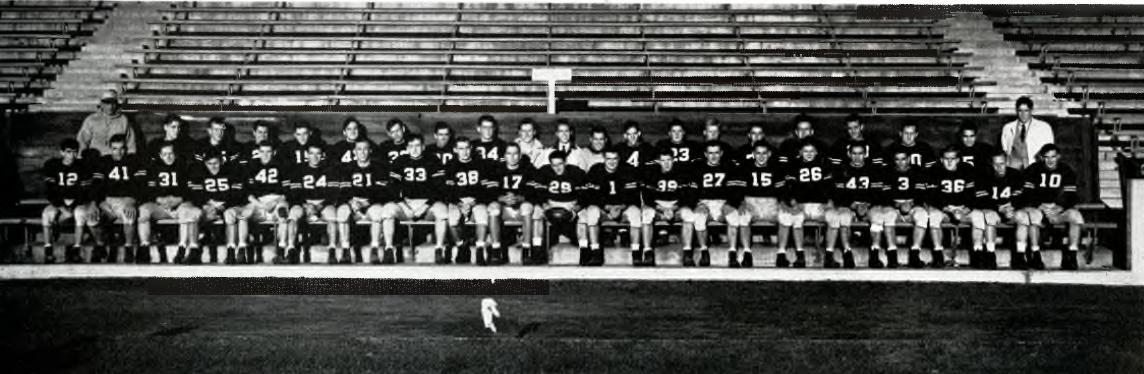
- Conference: New England Conference
- Record: 1–3 (1–1 New England)
- Head coach: Herbert Snow (1st season)
- Offensive scheme: Single-wing formation
- Captain: Claude Henry
- Home stadium: Lewis Field

1944 New England Conference football standings
	Conf.					Overall
Team	W		L		T	W		L		T
New Hampshire +	1	–	1	–	0	1	–	3	–	0
Maine +	1	–	1	–	0	2	–	2	–	0
Connecticut	0	–	0	–	0	7	–	1	–	0
+ – Conference co-champions

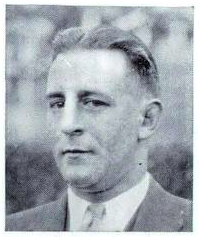
Head coach Herbert Snow, from the 1934 yearbook of Wellesley High School

The 1944 New Hampshire Wildcats football team represented the University of New Hampshire in the 1944 college football season. The Wildcats were led by first-year head coach Herbert Snow and completed the season with a record of 1–3. The team played its home games at Lewis Field (also known as Lewis Stadium) in Durham, New Hampshire.

== Background ==
New Hampshire had not fielded a team in 1943, due to World War II. In mid-September 1944, university administrators approved an "informal" team, limited to four games, with a roster consisting of 17-year-olds and returning veterans. The program's most recent head coach, Charles M. Justice, had entered the Navy in April 1944. Selected as his successor was Herbert Snow, a Springfield College graduate who had been the head coach at Wellesley High School in Massachusetts. The team began practices in early October, with only one player from their 1942 squad—Claude Henry, a reserve back who had returned to the university after serving in the Marine Corps.

== Schedule ==
Date	Time	Opponent	Site	Result	Attendance	Source
October 21		at Maine	Alumni Field; Orono, ME (rivalry)	L 6–13		
October 28		Middlebury*	Lewis Field; Durham, NH	L 7–27		
November 4		at Middlebury*	Porter Field; Middlebury, VT	L 7–21		
November 11	2:00 p.m.	Maine	Lewis Field; Durham, NH	W 19–14	1,200	
*Non-conference game; Source:

The 1944 games remain the last time that the Middlebury and New Hampshire football programs have met.

== Roster ==
1944 New Hampshire Wildcats football team roster
Centers: Everett Abbott; Steven Morang (Portsmouth, NH); Richard Ravgiala (Methuen, MA); Roger Tyler (Durham, NH); Guards: Morton Baum (Lynn, MA); Van Evangelou (Newport, NH); George Haselton; Alfred Miles (Winthrop, MA); Leon Stevens (Farmington, NH); Tackles: Robert Beauregard (Marlborough, NH); David Brown (Epsom, NH); Edward Gulubicky (Haverhill, MA); William Holleman (Springfield, NH); Calvin Jones; Eugene Morrison; Jack Richardson; Daniel Rogers	Ends: Howard Chandler; Elliot Easterbrook; Charles Kearney (Auburndale, MA); Leo Lajoie; Edward Noyes (Manchester, NH); Edward "Red" Ryder (Durham, NH); Jack Stuart (Belmont, MA); Fred White (Wolfeboro, NH); Backs: Steve Aliapoulios (Manchester, NH); Bill Black (Nashua, NH); Oliver Fifield; Kenneth Friborg (Manchester, NH); John Hawke; Claude Henry (Cambridge, MA); William Pizzano (Revere, MA); David Randall; Henry Spear; Joseph Swekla (Nashua, NH); Victor Szalucka (Claremont, NH); Charles Thayer (Epping, NH)

== Game summaries ==
=== October 21: at Maine ===
New Hampshire at Maine – Game summary

Quarter	1	2	3	4	Total
Wildcats	0	0	0	6	6
Black Bears	7	6	0	0	13

at Alumni Field, Orono, Maine

- Date: October 21
- Game weather: Rain
- Referee: Daley
- Newspaper: The Portsmouth Herald (October 23, 1944), The Maine Campus (October 26, 1944)

Game information
First quarter
- Maine – John Goff 4-yard run (Johnny Mayo conversion run good). Drive: 40 yards.

Second quarter

- Maine – Gene Boutillier 43-yard run (conversion pass failed). Drive: 1 play, 48 yards.

Fourth quarter

- UNH – Bill Pizzano 4-yard run (conversion run failed). Drive: 2 plays, 5 yards.

=== October 28: vs. Middlebury ===
Middlebury at New Hampshire – Game summary

Quarter	1	2	3	4	Total
Panthers	7	0	7	13	27
Wildcats	0	7	0	0	7

at Lewis Field, Durham, New Hampshire

- Date: October 28
- Referee: Marston
- Newspaper: The Portsmouth Herald (October 30, 1944), Rutland Daily Herald (October 30, 1944)

Game information

First quarter

- Middlebury – Joe Dineen run (Barrett conversion kick good). Drive: 19 yards.

Second quarter

- UNH – Joe Swekla 5-yard run (Bill Black conversion kick good).

Third quarter

- Middlebury – George Long 20-yard run (Barrett conversion kick good). Drive: 56 yards.

Fourth quarter

- Middlebury – George Long 13-yard run (Barrett conversion kick good). Drive: 45 yards.
- Middlebury – Young 1-yard run (conversion failed).

First downs

- Panthers – 20
- Wildcats – 6

Rushing yards

- Panthers – 266
- Wildcats – 78

Passing yards (comp–att)

- Panthers – 9 (1–2)
- Wildcats – 23 (5–10)

Fumbles (total–lost)

- Panthers – 8–5
- Wildcats – 4–2

Punting average yards

- Panthers – 33
- Wildcats – 31.5

Yards penalized

- Panthers – 50
- Wildcats – 10

=== November 4: at Middlebury ===
New Hampshire at Middlebury – Game summary

Quarter	1	2	3	4	Total
Wildcats	0	0	0	7	7
Panthers	0	0	14	7	21

at Porter Field, Middlebury, Vermont

- Date: November 4
- Newspaper: The Portsmouth Herald (November 6, 1944), Rutland Daily Herald (November 6, 1944)

Game information
Third quarter
- Middlebury – Ronnie Richards 2-yard fumble recovery (Karambelas conversion kick good).
- Middlebury – Phil Barrett 3-yard run (Karambelas conversion kick good). Drive: 42 yards.

Fourth quarter

- UNH – Joe Swekla 3-yard pass from Bill Black (Black conversion kick good). Drive: 2 plays, 20 yards.
- Middlebury – Karambelas 15-yard run (Karambelas conversion kick good).

=== November 11: vs. Maine ===
Maine at New Hampshire – Game summary

Quarter	1	2	3	4	Total
Black Bears	0	0	14	0	14
Wildcats	0	6	0	13	19

at Lewis Field, Durham, New Hampshire

- Date: November 11
- Referee: Eugene Callahan
- Newspaper: The Portsmouth Herald (November 14, 1944), The Maine Campus (November 16, 1944)

Game information
Second quarter
- UNH – touchdown run† (conversion failed).

Third quarter

- Maine – Don Buckley 25-yard run (Lenny Plavin conversion kick good). Drive: 1 play, 25 yards.
- Maine – Roy Henderson 6-yard run (Lenny Plavin conversion kick good).

Fourth quarter

- UNH – Bill Black 6-yard run (Black conversion kick good).
- UNH – touchdown run† (conversion failed).

† touchdowns by Bill Black and Joe Swekla (order unknown)

== Statistics ==
=== Scores by quarter ===
	1	2	3	4	Total
All opponents	14	6	35	20	75
New Hampshire	0	13	0	26	39

=== New Hampshire scoring ===
Player	Touchdowns	Conversions	Points
Bill Black	3	3	21
Joe Swekla	2	–	12
Bill Pizzano	1	–	6
Total	6	3	39

== Honors ==
Quarterback Bill Pizzano was named to the All-New England Small College Team; he was later inducted to the university's athletic hall of fame, in 2004.
