= Trevor J. Rees =

Trevor Rees
Biographical details
- Born: October 22, 1913; Dover, Ohio, U.S.
- Died: January 2, 1999 (aged 85); Naples, Florida, U.S.

Playing career
- 1933–1935: Ohio State
- Position: End

Coaching career (HC unless noted)
- 1936–1940: Shaw HS (OH)
- 1941: Ohio State (freshmen)
- 1942: Iowa Pre-Flight (ends)
- 1945: Ohio State (assistant)
- 1946–1963: Kent State

Administrative career (AD unless noted)
- 1946–1956: Kent State

Head coaching record
- Overall: 92–63–5 (college)
- Bowls: 0–1

Trevor J. Rees (October 22, 1913 – January 2, 1999) was an American football player, coach, and college athletics administrator.

Rees was born on October 22, 1913, in Dover, Ohio. He attended Dover High School, where he succeeded as a multi-sport star athlete, graduating in 1932. He played college football at Ohio State University from 1933 to 1935.

Rees served as the head football coach at Kent State University from 1946 to 1963, compiling a record of 92–63–5. His 92 wins are the most of any head coach in the history of the Kent State Golden Flashes football program. Rees was also the athletic director at Kent State from 1946 to 1956. He entered the United States Navy in 1942 and worked as an ends coach with the Iowa Pre-Flight Seahawks under Bernie Bierman. He also established sports programs at four bases in South America during World War II.

He died on January 2, 1999, at his home in Naples, Florida.

== Head coaching record ==
=== College ===
Year	Team	Overall	Conference	Standing	Bowl/playoffs
Kent State Golden Flashes (Ohio Athletic Conference) (1946–1950)
1946	Kent State	6–2	1–1	10th	
1947	Kent State	4–4	3–1	T–5th	
1948	Kent State	6–2–1	3–0	3rd	
1949	Kent State	5–3	2–0	3rd	
1950	Kent State	5–4	2–1	7th	
Kent State Golden Flashes (Mid-American Conference) (1951–1963)
1951	Kent State	4–3–2	2–1	3rd	
1952	Kent State	5–4	2–2	T–4th	
1953	Kent State	7–2	3–1	3rd	
1954	Kent State	8–2	4–1	2nd	L Refrigerator
1955	Kent State	6–2–1	4–1–1	T–2nd	
1956	Kent State	7–2	4–2	3rd	
1957	Kent State	3–6	1–5	7th	
1958	Kent State	7–2	5–1	2nd	
1959	Kent State	5–3	3–3	T–4th	
1960	Kent State	6–3	4–2	3rd	
1961	Kent State	2–8	1–5	7th	
1962	Kent State	3–6	2–4	5th	
1963	Kent State	3–5–1	1–5	T–6th	
Kent State:		92–63–5	47–36–1		
Total:		92–63–5			
