= Paul Baldacci =

American football player and coach (1907–1984)

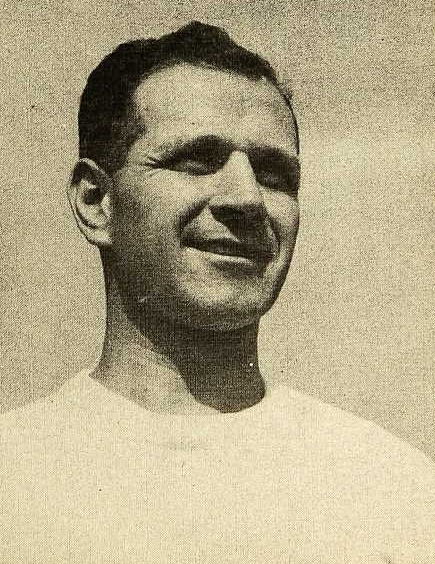
- Baldacci from The 1948 Tel-Buch

Biographical details
- Born: January 25, 1907; Richmond, Virginia, U.S.
- Died: November 1, 1984 (aged 77); San Rafael, California, U.S.

Playing career
- 1926, 1928–1930: William & Mary
- Position: Halfback

Coaching career (HC unless noted)
- 1931–1941: St. Benedict HS (VA)
- 1942: Akron (assistant)
- 1946–1947: Akron

Head coaching record
- Overall: 7–10 (college)

Paul Ruppert Baldacci (January 25, 1907 – November 1, 1984) was an American football player and coach. He served as the head football coach at the University of Akron in Ohio from 1946 to 1947, compiling a record of 7–10.

Baldacci was born in Virginia to Louis and Roselee (Carrera) Baldacci, Italian immigrants to the United States.

== Head coaching record ==
=== College ===
Year	Team	Overall	Conference	Standing	Bowl/playoffs
Akron Zippers (Ohio Athletic Conference) (1946–1947)
1946	Akron	5–4	3–4	T–11th	
1947	Akron	2–6	2–5	17th	
Akron:		7–10	5–9		
Total:		7–10			
