= George E. Allen (coach) =

American football player and coach (1911–1997)

- Allen pictured in The Prism 1943, Maine yearbook

Biographical details
- Born: December 31, 1911; Oldtown, Kentucky, U.S.
- Died: September 2, 1997 (aged 85)

Playing career

Football
- 1932–1934: West Virginia
- Position: Quarterback

Coaching career (HC unless noted)

Football
- 1935: Parkersburg HS (WV) (backfield)
- 1936: Parkersburg HS (WV)
- 1937–1940: Brown (backfield)
- 1941: Maine
- 1946–1948: Maine
- 1949–c. 1954: Fordham (backfield)

Basketball
- 1935–1937: Parkersburg HS (WV)
- 1938–1941: Brown
- 1945–1949: Maine

Head coaching record
- Overall: 15–11–2 (college football); 73–53 (college basketball)
- Tournaments: Basketball; 0–1 (NCAA)

Accomplishments and honors

Championships
- Football; 1 MIAA (1947)

George Elliott "Eck" Allen (December 31, 1911 – September 2, 1997) was an American football player and coach of football and basketball. He served as the head football coach at the University of Maine in 1941 and from 1946 to 1948, tallying a mark of 15–11–2. Allen was also the head basketball coach at Brown University from 1938 to 1941 and at Maine from 1945 to 1949, compiling a career college basketball record of 73–53.

== Early life and playing career ==
Allen was born in Oldtown, Kentucky and attended high school in Ashland. He played football at the West Virginia University from 1932 to 1934.

== Later life and death ==
After retiring from coaching, Allen worked as a salesman of materials used in steel production. He died on September 2, 1997, at the age of 85 after a long illness. He was a resident of Kissimmee, Florida at the time of his death.

== Head coaching record ==
=== College football ===
| Year | Team | Overall | Conference | Standing | Bowl/playoffs |
|---|---|---|---|---|---|
Maine Black Bears (Maine Intercollegiate Athletic Association / New England Conference) (1941)
| 1941 | Maine | 3–2–2 | 1–1–1 / 2–1–1 | 3rd / 2nd | |
Maine Black Bears (Maine Intercollegiate Athletic Association / Yankee Conference) (1946–1948)
| 1946 | Maine | 2–5 | 2–1 / 0–3 | 2nd / 6th | |
| 1947 | Maine | 6–1 | 3–0 / 2–1 | 1st / 2nd | |
| 1948 | Maine | 4–3 | 2–1 / 1–2 | / 5th | |
| Maine: | | 15–11–2 | 13–10–2 | | |
| Total: | | 15–11–2 | | | |

=== College basketball ===
Record table
| Season | Team | Overall | Conference | Standing | Postseason |
|---|---|---|---|---|---|
Brown Bears (Independent) (1938–1941)
| 1938–39 | Brown | 16–4 | | | NCAA Elite Eight |
| 1939–40 | Brown | 13–6 | | | |
| 1940–41 | Brown | 10–10 | | | |
| Brown: | | 39–20 (.661) | | | |
Maine Black Bears (Yankee Conference) (1945–1947)
| 1945–46 | Maine | 10–4 | 4–4 | 3rd | |
| 1946–47 | Maine | 9–8 | 2–4 | 4th | |
| 1947–48 | Maine | 11–7 | | | |
| 1948–49 | Maine | 4–14 | | | |
| Maine: | | 34–33 (.507) | 6–8 (.429) | | |
| Total: | | 73–53 (.579) | | | |

== See also ==
- List of college football head coaches with non-consecutive tenure
