= Bill Orwig =

American football player and coach (1907–1994)

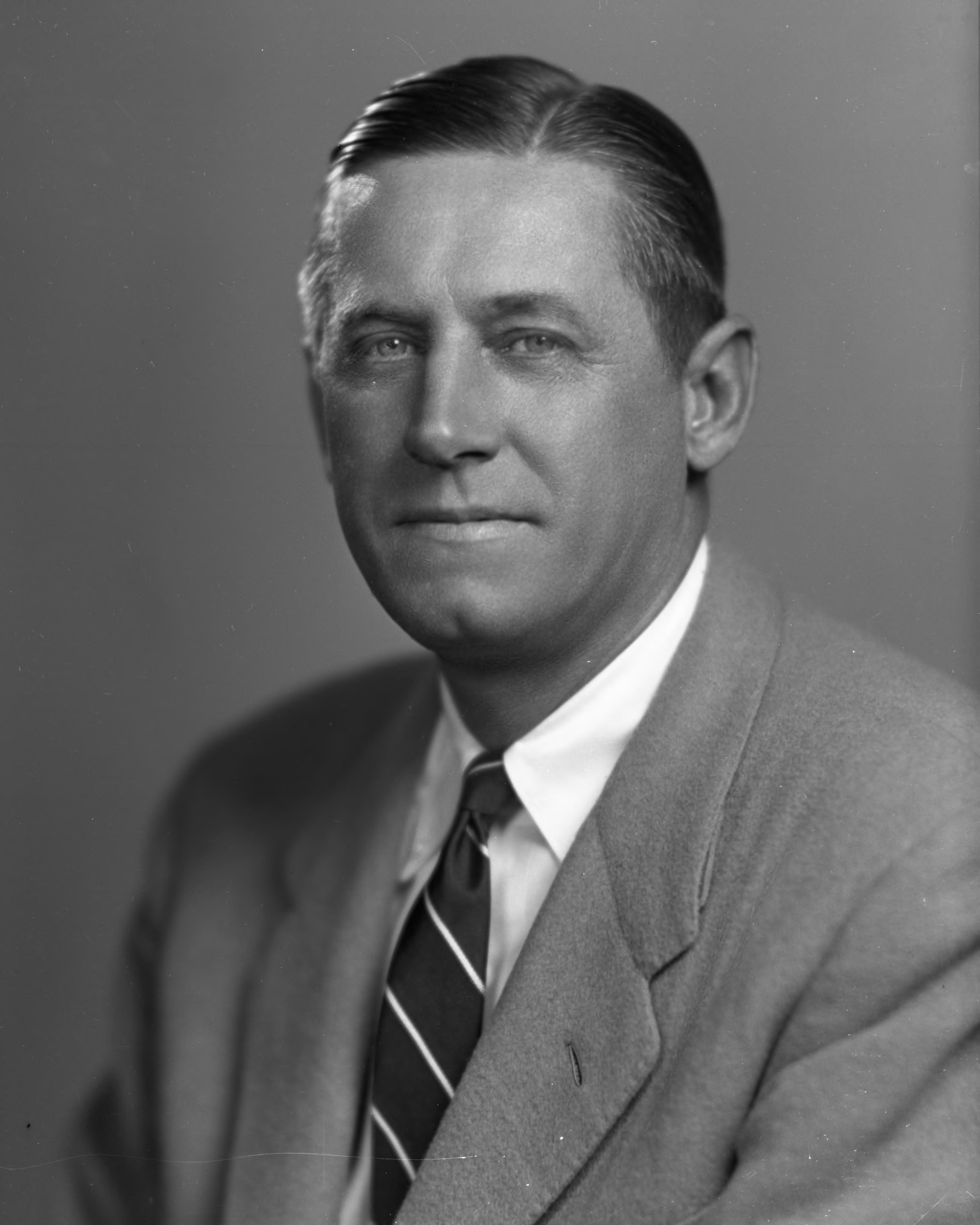
- Orwig c. 1950

Biographical details
- Born: January 1, 1907; Cleveland, Ohio, U.S.
- Died: July 30, 1994 (aged 87); St. Joseph, Michigan, U.S.

Playing career

Football
- 1928: Michigan

Basketball
- 1927–1930: Michigan
- Positions: End (football); Guard (basketball)

Coaching career (HC unless noted)

Football
- 1930: Michigan (GA)
- 1931–1935: Benton Harbor HS (MI)
- 1936–1945: Libbey HS (OH)
- 1946–1947: Toledo
- 1948–1953: Michigan (assistant)

Basketball
- 1936–1945: Libbey HS (OH)
- 1946–1947: Toledo

Administrative career (AD unless noted)
- 1954–1961: Nebraska
- 1961–1975: Indiana

Head coaching record
- Overall: 15–4–2 (college football); 18–6 (college basketball)
- Bowls: 2–0

James Wilfred "Bill" Orwig (January 1, 1907 – July 30, 1994) was an American football and basketball player, coach, and college athletics administrator. He played college football and college basketball at the University of Michigan. He later served as the athletic director at the University of Toledo, the University of Nebraska, and the Indiana University Bloomington.

Raised in Toledo, Ohio, Orwig was an all-state athlete in high school and went on to be an All-Big Ten Conference basketball player at Michigan. He received three varsity letters in basketball and one in football. After graduating from Michigan, Orwig was a successful high school football and basketball coach from 1931 to 1945 in Benton Harbor, Michigan, and Toledo. He helped develop an athletic program for the occupation forces in Germany and became the athletic director, football coach, and basketball coach at the University of Toledo after World War II.

From 1948 to 1951, Orwig was an assistant football coach at Michigan in charge of ends, participating in Michigan's 1948 national championship team and the 1950 team that won the Big Ten championship and the Rose Bowl. He accepted a job as athletic director at the University of Nebraska in 1954 and remained there for seven years. In 1961, he was hired as athletic director at Indiana University and led the Hoosiers from a four-year NCAA probation to 37 Big Ten Conference championships and seven NCAA championships. He hired Bobby Knight as basketball coach at Indiana, and has been inducted into the Halls of Fame at Indiana, Michigan and Toledo.

== Athlete at Scott High School and University of Michigan ==
Born in Cleveland and raised in Toledo, Ohio, Orwig won letters in football, basketball, baseball and swimming at Scott High School, and won all-state honors in football and basketball. He played guard for the University of Michigan basketball team three years, from 1928 to 1930, helping the team win the Big Ten Conference championship in his junior year, 1928–29. He was picked as an All-Big Ten basketball player in 1930. He also played at the end position for the Michigan football team in 1928. While at Michigan, he was a member of Phi Mu Delta fraternity and a member of the Michigauma society. He graduated from the School of Education in 1930. From 1930 to 1931, Orwig was a graduate assistant working with Michigan's freshman football team, and also tutoring freshman player and future U.S. President Gerald R. Ford.

== Football and basketball coach at Benton Harbor, Toledo and Michigan ==
In May 1931, Orwig succeeded Wally Weber as head football coach at Benton Harbor High School in Benton Harbor, Michigan. In five years at Benton Harbor, the football team won 75% of its games, including a 4–0–1 record against rival St. Joseph High School. Orwig also coached the basketball and tennis teams, and in 1934, he led the first Benton Harbor basketball team ever to win a regional championship. He also coached Earl Brown at Benton Harbor, who went on to be an All-American at Notre Dame. In 1936, he moved back to his hometown, Toledo, to be the basketball and football coach at Libbey High School. At Libbey, Orwig's teams won three state football championships and six city basketball crowns. He worked with the U.S. State Department during World War II, helping to set up an athletic program for the occupation forces in Germany. Orwig was hired in 1946 as the athletic director at the University of Toledo, where he helped reinstate the athletic programs after the end of World War II. He was also the Toledo Rockets football coach, leading the team to a 15–4–2 record and an Ohio Conference title. In one season as Toledo's basketball coach, he led the team to a 19–6 record. He returned to Michigan in 1948 as an assistant football coach under Bennie Oosterbaan, and was one of the coaches on Michigan's undefeated 1948 national championship team, and its 1950 Rose Bowl championship team. He remained as an assistant football coach at Michigan from 1948 to 1953. As the ends coach at Michigan, Orwig helped develop Dick Rifenberg, Lowell Perry, Harry Allis, and Ozzie Clark.

== University of Nebraska ==
In March 1954, Orwig signed a three-year contract as the athletic director at the University of Nebraska for $12,600 a year. He remained at Nebraska until 1961, and during his tenure the Corhuskers started to emerge into national prominence. Orwig was responsible during his seven years at Nebraska for creating the Touchdown Club, the Extra Point Club and the Husker Athletic Achievement Awards. However, the football team did not fare well during Orwig's time there, as the football program went through three coaches (Bill Glassford, Pete Elliott, and Bill Jennings), and had a 27–44 record. Orwig was the athletic director who hired Pete Elliott as the football coach at Nebraska in 1956. Elliott later recalled, "I thought the world of him. I thought he was a great guy." In 1961, Orwig quit his position at Nebraska to accept the athletic director job at Indiana; news reports indicated that Orwig had been offered $20,000 a year by Indiana, $5,000 more than he was making at Nebraska. At the time, Orwig said: "The decision to accept the Indiana University position as Director of Athletics was a most difficult one. . . . The people of Nebraska and the University have been most kind to me over the past 7 years. Their understanding of our problems, their excellent help and their friendship have been heartwarming. . . . I leave Nebraska with the greatest admiration for its administrative staff, its teaching staff, and its increasing educational strength. . . . My thanks go out to all my friends throughout the state and best wishes and hopes to the Cornhuskers for many victories in the years to come." Football coach Bill Jennings said, "I'm sorry to see Bill leave and I'm sure everybody who has worked with him does. He's done a fine job. Nebraska's loss is Indiana's gain."

== Athletic director at Indiana University ==
Orwig was the athletic director at Indiana University from 1961 to 1975. He took over as athletic director in February 1961, ten months into a four-year NCAA probation. On accepting the post, Orwig said: "No strong athletic department has been built on fraud. We'll never have a part of that as long as I am the director at Indiana University. I know there have been mistakes made here, but I think they've been honest ones. These are mistakes to be corrected." In the 61 years preceding Orwig's arrival, Indiana had won 49 conference championships and seven NCAA championships. During Orwig's 15 years, the Hoosiers won 37 Big Ten championships in seven sports and six NCAA titles including a tie for the Big Ten football title in 1967 and a Rose Bowl appearance. Home football attendance at Indiana averaged 25,854 the year before Orwig arrived, and by 1969 it had more than doubled to 53,319. Orwig also guided the expansion of the school's athletic facilities, including the Assembly Hall basketball facility. Among the coaches hired by Orwig were John Pont in football and Bobby Knight in basketball. Bobby Knight said of Orwig: "Bill Orwig, the athletic director who hired me, was a man of exceptional intelligence and class who knew how to get along with people and work with coaches. He had a great arrogance, in a positive way—he knew he was damned good at what he did. I think more than anybody else in the school's history, Bill Orwig developed Indiana's athletic program into a major league operation—facilities, teams, coaches. Sam Bell was a nationally respected track coach. Doc Counsilman was one of the great coaches of all time; John Pont took a team to the Rose Bowl; and Jerry Yeagley started the soccer program and built it from nothing into the best one going. The architect of all that, Bill Orwig, is in the college athletic directors hall of fame." He was also one of the founders and the first president from 1969 to 1970 of the National Athletic Directors of America.

== Orwig's speech about the 1946 NIT finals ==
When he won the NIT-NACDA Athletic Directors Award, he said in his speech: "I have always been a great believer in sports as part of our American way of living. . . . I am reminded of an experience I had of 40 years ago which brought home the real sudden realization of how important we are, and how important it is to have sports in our American way of life. I mentioned 40 years ago, that would bring us back to March of 1946. At that time I was involved in some high school work in Toledo, Ohio, as a football and a basketball coach. But in order to augment my income, because we weren't getting paid a great deal in those days, I was doing some officiating. I was very fortunate to be chosen by the Big Ten Conference to work the Final Four of the NCAA, which in that year was held in Madison Square Garden. I went a day or two early so I could watch the finals of the NIT Tournament. The two teams were Utah and Kentucky. On the Utah team was a little Japanese-American boy by the name of Walter Misaka. On the Kentucky team was a great basketball player, number one in the country, by the name of Ralph Beard. Misaka was about 5'10" and probably weighed around 160 pounds. Beard was about 6'2" or 6'3" and weighed about 190 He was called 'Mr. Everything' in basketball. Nobody had ever heard of Walter, but in the man to man defense that the Utah coach, Peterson, used against Kentucky that night, Misaka was chosen to guard Ralph Beard. He held Ralph Beard to 3 points, one basket and one free throw, and as a result of the great work that this little guy did on Ralph Beard, and of course, the work of his teammates, Utah won the game and won the National Invitation Tournament Championship. Just before the end of the ballgame, with just about a minute to play, the Utah coach took Misaka out of the game. About 14,000 people in the Garden that night rose to a person and stood on their feet and cheered the great effort turned out by the little Japanese-American boy. As I reflected on it later, I thought what a great display of how sports are in the American way of life. Remember, I mentioned the date was March, 1946. We had just finished a war with Japan. There were people in the audience who had lost loved ones in the Japanese conflict. There wasn't much love in the heart of any of those people or any American for that matter, for anyone of Japanese ancestry. Yet they could cast aside all of their dislike for the Japanese race and stand on their feet at a sports contest and cheer the efforts of a little Japanese-American boy. Since that time I realize how great our sports program is in America, and how much it means to the American way of life."

== Later years and awards ==
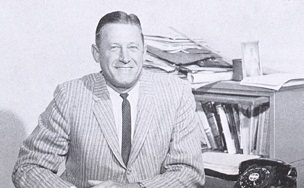
Orwig as athletic director at Nebraska

After stepping down as Indiana's athletic director in 1975, Orwig retired with his wife to Sister Lakes in southwestern Michigan, where he was a volunteer and fundraiser for the University of Michigan athletic scholarship program and sat on the board of directors of the Michigan Health Care Association, the State Bank of Coloma, the Southwestern Michigan Humane Society, and the Berrien Hills Country Club. He also enjoyed fishing and playing golf. Orwig and his wife Jane Orwig (formerly Jane Ingrid Anderson) had two children. Orwig and his wife were married in 1933 in St. Joseph, Michigan.

Since 1976, the Bill Orwig Medal has been awarded each year by the Indiana University Alumni Association to recognize outstanding contributions made by a non-alumnus to the IU athletic program.

In 1978, Orwig received the James J. Corbett Memorial Award, presented annually to the collegiate administrator who "through the years has most typified Corbett's devotion to intercollegiate athletics and worked unceasingly for its betterment." On receiving the award, Orwig said: "This award is kind of like being named coach of the year. It's the top award you can get in the field of athletic administration. It pleases me immensely, particularly since I was elected by my peers after I had retired."

Orwig was inducted into the University of Michigan Athletic Hall of Honor in 1984 and the Indiana University Hall of Fame in 1987. He has also been inducted into the Toledo Rockets' Varsity 'T' Hall of Fame.

Orwig died of cancer on July 30, 1994, in St. Joseph, Michigan.

== Head coaching record ==
=== College football ===
| Year | Team | Overall | Conference | Standing | Bowl/playoffs |
|---|---|---|---|---|---|
Toledo Rockets (Ohio Athletic Conference) (1946–1947)
| 1946 | Toledo | 6–2–2 | 4–0 | T–2nd | W Glass |
| 1947 | Toledo | 9–2 | 3–1 | T–5th | W Glass |
| Toledo: | | 15–4–2 | 7–1 | | |
| Total: | | 15–4–2 | | | |
