= 1946 Rhode Island State Rams football team =

American college football season

1946 Rhode Island State Rams football
- Conference: New England Conference
- Record: 2–4 (1–2 New England Conference)
- Head coach: Bill Beck (2nd season)
- Home stadium: Meade Stadium

1946 New England Conference football standings
	Conf.					Overall
Team	W		L		T	W		L		T
New Hampshire +	2	–	0	–	1	6	–	1	–	1
Connecticut +	2	–	0	–	1	4	–	3	–	1
Rhode Island State	1	–	2	–	0	2	–	4	–	0
Maine	0	–	3	–	0	2	–	5	–	0
+ – Conference co-champions

The 1946 Rhode Island Rams football team was an American football team that represented Rhode Island State College (later renamed the University of Rhode Island) during the 1946 college football season. In its second season under head coach Bill Beck, the team compiled a 2–4 record (1–2 against conference opponents) and finished in third place in the conference. The team played its home games at Meade Stadium in Kingston, Rhode Island.

== Schedule ==
Date	Opponent	Site	Result	Attendance	Source
September 28	at Maine	Alumni Field; Orono, ME	W 14–13	4,000	
October 5	at New Hampshire	Lewis Field; Durham, NH	L 12–25	6,000	
October 12	at Brown*	Brown Stadium; Providence, RI (rivalry)	L 0–29	20,000	
October 19	at Massachusetts State*	Alumni Field; Amherst, MA	W 14–6		
November 2	at Boston University*	Nickerson Field; Weston, MA	L 6–29	4,000	
November 9	Connecticut^{†}	Meade Stadium; Kingston, RI (rivalry)	L 0–33		
*Non-conference game; ^{†}Homecoming
