= 1946 Connecticut Huskies football team =

American college football season

1946 Connecticut Huskies football

New England Conference co-champion
- Conference: New England Conference
- Record: 4–3–1 (2–0–1 New England)
- Head coach: J. Orlean Christian (12th season)
- Home stadium: Gardner Dow Athletic Fields

1946 New England Conference football standings
	Conf.					Overall
Team	W		L		T	W		L		T
New Hampshire +	2	–	0	–	1	6	–	1	–	1
Connecticut +	2	–	0	–	1	4	–	3	–	1
Rhode Island State	1	–	2	–	0	2	–	4	–	0
Maine	0	–	3	–	0	2	–	5	–	0
+ – Conference co-champions

The 1946 Connecticut Huskies football team represented the University of Connecticut in the 1946 college football season. The Huskies were led by 12th-year head coach J. Orlean Christian, and completed the season with a record of 4–3–1.

== Schedule ==
Date	Opponent	Site	Result	Attendance	Source
September 28	at Harvard*	Harvard Stadium; Boston, MA	L 0–7	14,000	
October 5	Springfield^{†}*	Gardner Dow Athletic Fields; Storrs, CT	W 25–0	3,500	
October 12	at Wesleyan*	North Field; Middletown, CT	L 2–7		
October 19	Maine	Gardner Dow Athletic Fields; Storrs, CT	W 21–20	7,300	
October 26	Lehigh*	Taylor Stadium; Bethlehem, PA	L 0–10	4,500	
November 2	Coast Guard*	Gardner Dow Field; Storrs, CT	W 27–13		
November 9	at Rhode Island State	Meade Stadium; Kingston, RI (rivalry)	W 33–0		
November 16	at New Hampshire	Lewis Field; Durham, NH	T 12–12	6,000	
*Non-conference game; ^{†}Homecoming

== After the season ==
The 1947 NFL draft was held on December 16, 1946. The following Huskies were selected.

Round	Pick	Player	Position	NFL club
24	224	Bill Moll	Back	New York Giants
28	259	Milt Dropo	Center	Washington Redskins
