= Battle for the Brice–Cowell Musket =

American college football rivalry

- Maine Black Bears New Hampshire Wildcats
- Sport: Football
- First meeting: September 26, 1903; Maine, 10–0
- Latest meeting: November 21, 2026; New Hampshire, 24–21
- Next meeting: November 20, 2027
- Trophy: Brice–Cowell Musket

Statistics
- Total meetings: 116
- All-time series: New Hampshire leads, 62–46–8
- Trophy series: New Hampshire leads, 46–28–4 (since 1948)
- Largest victory: New Hampshire, 63–13 (1993)
- Longest win streak: Maine, 8 (1903–1911); New Hampshire, 8 (2011–2017)
- Longest unbeaten streak: Maine, 9 (1903–1916)
- Current win streak: New Hampshire, 5 (2022–present)

Locations of Maine and New Hampshire

The Battle for the Brice–Cowell Musket is the rivalry between the Maine Black Bears and the New Hampshire Wildcats. Both schools are members of CAA Football, the legally separate football league operated by the multi-sports Coastal Athletic Association (CAA). Through the 2025 season, the two teams have met 116 times on the football field, with New Hampshire currently holding a 62–46–8 edge in the all-time series.

== History ==
The winner of each year's game gets possession of an "antique fowling" musket named after former head coaches of the two programs: Fred Brice, who coached at Maine (1921–1940), and Butch Cowell, who coached at New Hampshire (1915–1936). The musket was "donated by Portland alumni of the two institutions", and was first awarded to the winner of the 1948 game (New Hampshire). It is a flintlock with a 43-inch (110 cm) barrel in .65 caliber, made by Ebenezer Nutting of Falmouth, Maine, in the 1722–1745 era.

The teams have met annually since 1922 except for two seasons during World War II and the 2020 season when New Hampshire ended their season after playing just one game due to impact from the COVID-19 pandemic.

=== Notable games ===
The Maine and New Hampshire football programs first met in 1903, when two games were played, both won by Maine.

The 1919 contest ended in controversy, with confusion over whether a New Hampshire trick play in the final minute of the game was a touchdown or a touchback. Days later, a board of officials ruled the play a touchback, giving Maine a 7–3 win.

In 1944, the teams met twice, with each team winning the game played on its home field. The 1944 Wildcats played a limited four-game schedule, with a roster consisting of 17-year-olds and returning veterans. The results of these two games are listed in Maine's media guide and College Football Data Warehouse, but have been absent from New Hampshire's media guide.

The 1993 game had the largest margin of victory, 50 points, as New Hampshire won, 63–13.

News reports around the 2012 game referred to it as the 100th meeting between the two programs. If the aforementioned 1944 games are included the all-time series, as is reflected in the below table, the 2012 game was actually the 102nd meeting between the teams.

The only season to feature two games between the teams—other than 1903 and 1944 as mentioned above—was 2013, with New Hampshire first winning the regular season contest, and then a rematch as part of the 2013 FCS playoff.

The Maine–New Hampshire contest scheduled for November 21, 2020, was not played, as New Hampshire announced the postponement of fall sports due to the COVID-19 pandemic on July 17, 2020. On October 27, 2020, the CAA announced a tentative football schedule for spring 2021, with New Hampshire and Maine scheduled to play in Orono on April 17, 2021. However, on April 6, following the cancelation of three games due to COVID issues, New Hampshire opted out of the remainder of the season. Following the resumption of the rivalry in 2021, Maine defeated New Hampshire on November 20, 33–20.

== Game results ==
Maine victories	New Hampshire victories	Tie games

No.	Date	Location	Winner	Score
1	September 26, 1903	Orono, ME	Maine	18–0
2	October 24, 1903	Dover, NH	Maine	27–0
3	October 15, 1904	Orono, ME	Maine	6–0
4	October 28, 1905	Orono, ME	Maine	12–0
5	September 22, 1906	Orono, ME	Maine	7–0
6	October 17, 1908	Orono, ME	Maine	6–4
7	October 9, 1909	Orono, ME	Maine	16–0
8	October 7, 1911	Orono, ME	Maine	12–0
9	September 30, 1916	Orono, ME	Tie	0–0
10	November 10, 1917	Dover, NH	New Hampshire	27–0
11	November 15, 1919	Durham, NH	Maine	7–3
12	November 13, 1920	Orono, ME	New Hampshire	47–7
13	November 11, 1922	Manchester, NH	Maine	14–7
14	November 10, 1923	Portland, ME	Maine	13–0
15	November 8, 1924	Durham, NH	New Hampshire	33–0
16	November 14, 1925	Orono, ME	Tie	0–0
17	November 13, 1926	Durham, NH	New Hampshire	14–7
18	November 12, 1927	Orono, ME	Maine	13–6
19	October 20, 1928	Durham, NH	Maine	7–0
20	October 19, 1929	Orono, ME	New Hampshire	21–7
21	October 18, 1930	Durham, NH	New Hampshire	14–6
22	October 17, 1931	Orono, ME	New Hampshire	12–7
23	October 15, 1932	Durham, NH	Tie	7–7
24	October 21, 1933	Orono, ME	New Hampshire	6–0
25	October 20, 1934	Durham, NH	New Hampshire	24–7
26	October 12, 1935	Orono, ME	Maine	13–2
27	October 10, 1936	Durham, NH	Maine	27–6
28	October 9, 1937	Orono, ME	New Hampshire	13–0
29	October 8, 1938	Durham, NH	Maine	21–0
30	October 14, 1939	Orono, ME	Maine	6–0
31	October 12, 1940	Durham, NH	New Hampshire	20–14
32	October 11, 1941	Orono, ME	Tie	7–7
33	October 10, 1942	Durham, NH	New Hampshire	20–7
34	October 21, 1944	Orono, ME	Maine	13–6
35	November 11, 1944	Durham, NH	New Hampshire	19–14
36	October 12, 1946	Orono, ME	New Hampshire	27–0
37	October 11, 1947	Durham, NH	New Hampshire	28–7
38	October 9, 1948	Orono, ME	New Hampshire	27–6
39	October 8, 1949	Durham, NH	Maine	26–13
40	October 14, 1950	Orono, ME	New Hampshire	19–0
41	October 13, 1951	Durham, NH	Tie	0–0
42	October 11, 1952	Orono, ME	Maine	24–7
43	October 10, 1953	Durham, NH	New Hampshire	21–6
44	October 9, 1954	Orono, ME	New Hampshire	21–10
45	October 8, 1955	Durham, NH	Tie	6–6
46	October 13, 1956	Orono, ME	Maine	29–7
47	October 12, 1957	Durham, NH	Maine	7–0
48	October 11, 1958	Orono, ME	Maine	14–0
49	October 10, 1959	Durham, NH	Tie	7–7
50	October 8, 1960	Orono, ME	Maine	13–7
51	October 14, 1961	Durham, NH	Maine	7–6
52	October 13, 1962	Orono, ME	New Hampshire	21–6
53	October 12, 1963	Durham, NH	Maine	28–8
54	October 10, 1964	Orono, ME	Maine	33–18
55	October 9, 1965	Durham, NH	Maine	48–13
56	October 8, 1966	Durham, NH	New Hampshire	10–7
57	October 14, 1967	Orono, ME	New Hampshire	17–0
58	October 12, 1968	Durham, NH	New Hampshire	42–17
59	October 11, 1969	Orono, ME	Maine	20–18

No.	Date	Location	Winner	Score
60	October 10, 1970	Durham, NH	New Hampshire	13–9
61	October 9, 1971	Orono, ME	New Hampshire	24–14
62	October 14, 1972	Durham, NH	New Hampshire	17–14
63	October 13, 1973	Orono, ME	New Hampshire	13–0
64	October 12, 1974	Durham, NH	Maine	23–9
65	October 11, 1975	Orono, ME	New Hampshire	24–15
66	October 9, 1976	Durham, NH	Maine	10–0
67	October 8, 1977	Orono, ME	New Hampshire	54–7
68	October 14, 1978	Orono, ME	Tie	7–7
69	October 13, 1979	Orono, ME	New Hampshire	23–0
70	October 11, 1980	Durham, NH	New Hampshire	19–13
71	October 10, 1981	Orono, ME	Maine	26–16
72	November 6, 1982	Durham, NH	Maine	31–14
73	November 5, 1983	Orono, ME	New Hampshire	20–7
74	September 8, 1984	Durham, NH	New Hampshire	21–13
75	November 9, 1985	Orono, ME	Maine	45–40
76	November 8, 1986	Durham, NH	Maine	14–13
77	November 7, 1987	Orono, ME	Maine	28–14
78	September 24, 1988	Orono, ME	New Hampshire	44–23
79	September 9, 1989	Durham, NH	Maine	24–7
80	September 22, 1990	Orono, ME	New Hampshire	28–20
81	September 28, 1991	Durham, NH	New Hampshire	38–20
82	September 5, 1992	Orono, ME	Maine	27–24
83	September 25, 1993	Durham, NH	New Hampshire	63–13
84	October 22, 1994	Orono, ME	New Hampshire	24–7
85	October 21, 1995	Durham, NH	New Hampshire	21–0
86	October 19, 1996	Orono, ME	Maine	34–20
87	October 25, 1997	Durham, NH	New Hampshire	24–7
88	September 12, 1998	Orono, ME	Maine	52–28
89	November 20, 1999	Durham, NH	New Hampshire	31–20
90	November 18, 2000	Orono, ME	Maine	55–10
91	November 17, 2001	Durham, NH	Maine	57–24
92	November 23, 2002	Orono, ME	Maine	31–14
93	November 22, 2003	Durham, NH	New Hampshire	47–27
94	November 20, 2004	Orono, ME	New Hampshire	50–36
95	November 19, 2005	Durham, NH	New Hampshire	59–47
96	November 18, 2006	Orono, ME	New Hampshire	19–13
97	November 17, 2007	Durham, NH	New Hampshire	39–14
98	November 22, 2008	Orono, ME	New Hampshire	28–24
99	November 21, 2009	Durham, NH	New Hampshire	27–24
100	October 2, 2010	Orono, ME	Maine	16–13
101	November 19, 2011	Durham, NH	New Hampshire	30–27
102	October 20, 2012	Orono, ME	New Hampshire	28–21
103	November 23, 2013	Durham, NH	New Hampshire	24–3
104	December 7, 2013^{A}	Orono, ME	New Hampshire	41–27
105	November 22, 2014	Orono, ME	New Hampshire	20–12
106	November 21, 2015	Durham, NH	New Hampshire	22–6
107	November 19, 2016	Orono, ME	New Hampshire	24–21
108	August 31, 2017	Durham, NH	New Hampshire	24–23
109	August 30, 2018	Orono, ME	Maine	35–7
110	November 23, 2019	Durham, NH	New Hampshire	28–10
111	November 20, 2021	Durham, NH	Maine	33–20
112	November 19, 2022	Orono, ME	New Hampshire	42–41^{OT}
113	November 18, 2023	Durham, NH	New Hampshire	44–25
114	November 23, 2024	Orono, ME	New Hampshire	27–9
115	November 22, 2025	Durham, NH	New Hampshire	33–27
116	November 21, 2026	Orono, ME	New Hampshire	24–21
Series: New Hampshire leads 62–46–8
^{A} 2013 FCS 2nd Round Playoff Game, Brice–Cowell Musket not on the line Trophy series: New Hampshire leads 46–28–4

Note: The score of the first game between the teams, held on September 26, 1903, is listed as 18–0 in the New Hampshire football media guide, and in contemporary news reports of 1903; College Football Data Warehouse and the Maine football media guide list it as 10–0.

== See also ==
- List of NCAA college football rivalry games
- List of most-played college football series in NCAA Division I
