= 1946 Dickinson Red Devils football team =

American college football season

1946 Dickinson Red and White football
- Conference: Independent
- Record: 6–1
- Head coach: Ralph Ricker (1st season)
- Home stadium: Biddle Field

1946 Eastern non-major college football independents records
	Conf.			Overall
Team	W	L	T	W		L		T
Thiel		–		7	–	0	–	0
Muhlenberg		–		9	–	1	–	0
Geneva		–		7	–	1	–	0
Dickinson		–		6	–	1	–	0
Alfred		–		5	–	1	–	0
Buffalo		–		7	–	2	–	0
Washington & Jefferson		–		6	–	2	–	0
Massachusetts State		–		6	–	2	–	0
Boston University		–		5	–	2	–	1
St. Lawrence		–		5	–	2	–	0
American International		–		4	–	2	–	1
Trinity (CT)		–		4	–	2	–	0
Swarthmore		–		5	–	3	–	0
Cortland State		–		4	–	3	–	0
Hofstra		–		4	–	3	–	0
Springfield		–		4	–	4	–	0
New York A&T		–		3	–	3	–	0
Northeastern		–		3	–	3	–	0
Scranton		–		4	–	5	–	1
Gettysburg		–		4	–	5	–	0
Drexel		–		3	–	4	–	0
Franklin & Marshall		–		3	–	4	–	0
Coast Guard		–		3	–	5	–	0
Tufts		–		1	–	6	–	0
CCNY		–		1	–	7	–	0
Carnegie Tech		–		0	–	6	–	0

The 1946 Dickinson Red and White football team was an American football team that represented Dickinson College as an independent during the 1946 college football season. In their first year under head coach Ralph Ricker, the Red Devils compiled a 6–1 record and outscored opponents by a total of 115 to 51. It was Dickinson's first season of college football since 1942, the program having been suspended during World War II. It was also the program's most successful season since the unbeaten 1937 season.

== Schedule ==
Date	Opponent	Site	Result	Attendance	Source
October 5	Lehigh	Biddle Field; Carlisle, PA	W 7–6	3,500–6,000	
October 12	Lebanon Valley	Biddle Field; Carlisle, PA	W 2–0	3,500	
October 19	Susquehanna	Biddle Field; Carlisle, PA	W 27–0	3,000	
October 26	at Washington and Jefferson	College Field; Washington, PA	L 7–19	5,500	
November 2	at Swarthmore	Alumni Field; Swarthmore, PA	W 14–0		
November 16	Western Maryland^{†}	Biddle Field; Carlisle, PA	W 25–20		
November 23	Allegheny	Biddle Field; Carlisle, PA	W 33–6	2,500	
^{†}Homecoming
