= 1946 Swarthmore Garnet Tide football team =

American college football season

1946 Swarthmore Garnet Tide football
- Conference: Independent
- Record: 5–3
- Head coach: Lew Elverson (5th season)
- Home stadium: Alumni Field

1946 Eastern non-major college football independents records
	Conf.			Overall
Team	W	L	T	W		L		T
Thiel		–		7	–	0	–	0
Muhlenberg		–		9	–	1	–	0
Geneva		–		7	–	1	–	0
Dickinson		–		6	–	1	–	0
Alfred		–		5	–	1	–	0
Buffalo		–		7	–	2	–	0
Washington & Jefferson		–		6	–	2	–	0
Massachusetts State		–		6	–	2	–	0
Boston University		–		5	–	2	–	1
St. Lawrence		–		5	–	2	–	0
American International		–		4	–	2	–	1
Trinity (CT)		–		4	–	2	–	0
Swarthmore		–		5	–	3	–	0
Cortland State		–		4	–	3	–	0
Hofstra		–		4	–	3	–	0
Springfield		–		4	–	4	–	0
New York A&T		–		3	–	3	–	0
Northeastern		–		3	–	3	–	0
Scranton		–		4	–	5	–	1
Gettysburg		–		4	–	5	–	0
Drexel		–		3	–	4	–	0
Franklin & Marshall		–		3	–	4	–	0
Coast Guard		–		3	–	5	–	0
Tufts		–		1	–	6	–	0
CCNY		–		1	–	7	–	0
Carnegie Tech		–		0	–	6	–	0

The 1946 Swarthmore Quakers football team was an American football team that represented Swarthmore College as an independent during the 1946 college football season. In its fifth, non-consecutive year under head coach Lew Elverson, Swarthmore compiled a 5–3 record and was outscored by a total of 129 to 70.

The team played its home games at Alumni Field in Swarthmore, Pennsylvania.

== Schedule ==
Date	Opponent	Site	Result	Attendance	Source
October 5	Wesleyan	Alumni Field; Swarthmore, PA	L 0–26		
October 12	Franklin & Marshall	Alumni Field; Swarthmore, PA	W 7–6		
October 19	at Muhlenberg	Muhlenberg Field; Allentown, PA	L 13–53	5,000	
October 26	at Ursinus	Collegeville, PA	W 19–12		
November 2	Dickinson	Alumni Field; Swarthmore, PA	L 0–14		
November 9	at Johns Hopkins	Baltimore, MD	W 6–0		
November 16	Drexel	Alumni Field; Swarthmore, PA	W 12–6	2,000	
November 23	at Haverford	Walton Field; Haverford, PA (rivalry)	W 13–12	5,000	
