= 1946 Washington & Jefferson Presidents football team =

American college football season

1946 Washington & Jefferson Presidents football
- Conference: Independent
- Record: 6–2
- Head coach: Henry Luecht (1st season)
- Home stadium: College Field

1946 Eastern non-major college football independents records
	Conf.			Overall
Team	W	L	T	W		L		T
Thiel		–		7	–	0	–	0
Muhlenberg		–		9	–	1	–	0
Geneva		–		7	–	1	–	0
Dickinson		–		6	–	1	–	0
Alfred		–		5	–	1	–	0
Buffalo		–		7	–	2	–	0
Washington & Jefferson		–		6	–	2	–	0
Massachusetts State		–		6	–	2	–	0
Boston University		–		5	–	2	–	1
St. Lawrence		–		5	–	2	–	0
American International		–		4	–	2	–	1
Trinity (CT)		–		4	–	2	–	0
Swarthmore		–		5	–	3	–	0
Cortland State		–		4	–	3	–	0
Hofstra		–		4	–	3	–	0
Springfield		–		4	–	4	–	0
New York A&T		–		3	–	3	–	0
Northeastern		–		3	–	3	–	0
Scranton		–		4	–	5	–	1
Gettysburg		–		4	–	5	–	0
Drexel		–		3	–	4	–	0
Franklin & Marshall		–		3	–	4	–	0
Coast Guard		–		3	–	5	–	0
Tufts		–		1	–	6	–	0
CCNY		–		1	–	7	–	0
Carnegie Tech		–		0	–	6	–	0

The 1946 Washington & Jefferson Presidents football team was an American football team that represented Washington & Jefferson College as an independent during the 1946 college football season. In their first season under head coach Henry Luecht, the Presidents compiled a 6–2 record and was outscored by a total of 150 to 46.

The team featured a freshman African-American back, "Deacon Dan" Towler. Towler later played six seasons in the National Football League and was selected to play in four Pro Bowls.

The team played it home games at College Field in Washington, Pennsylvania.

== Schedule ==
Date	Opponent	Site	Result	Attendance	Source
September 28	Bethany (WV)	College Field; Washington, PA	W 6–0		
October 5	at Geneva	Reeves Field; Beaver Falls, PA	L 0–12	6,000	
October 12	at Denison	Deeds Field; Granville, OH	W 12–6	3,500	
October 19	at Lafayette	Fisher Field; Easton, PA	L 6–7	4,000	
October 26	Dickinson	College Field; Washington, PA	W 19–7	5,500	
November 2	at Carnegie Tech	Forbes Field; Pittsburgh, PA	W 48–0	10,000	
November 9	Muskingum	College Field; Washington, PA	W 26–7	4,000	
November 16	Franklin & Marshall	College Field; Washington, PA	W 33–7		
