= 1946 Boston University Terriers football team =

American college football season

1946 Boston University Terriers football
- Conference: Independent
- Record: 5–2–1
- Head coach: Walt Holmer (2nd season)
- Home stadium: Nickerson Field

1946 Eastern non-major college football independents records
	Conf.			Overall
Team	W	L	T	W		L		T
Thiel		–		7	–	0	–	0
Muhlenberg		–		9	–	1	–	0
Geneva		–		7	–	1	–	0
Dickinson		–		6	–	1	–	0
Alfred		–		5	–	1	–	0
Buffalo		–		7	–	2	–	0
Washington & Jefferson		–		6	–	2	–	0
Massachusetts State		–		6	–	2	–	0
Boston University		–		5	–	2	–	1
St. Lawrence		–		5	–	2	–	0
American International		–		4	–	2	–	1
Trinity (CT)		–		4	–	2	–	0
Swarthmore		–		5	–	3	–	0
Cortland State		–		4	–	3	–	0
Hofstra		–		4	–	3	–	0
Springfield		–		4	–	4	–	0
New York A&T		–		3	–	3	–	0
Northeastern		–		3	–	3	–	0
Scranton		–		4	–	5	–	1
Gettysburg		–		4	–	5	–	0
Drexel		–		3	–	4	–	0
Franklin & Marshall		–		3	–	4	–	0
Coast Guard		–		3	–	5	–	0
Tufts		–		1	–	6	–	0
CCNY		–		1	–	7	–	0
Carnegie Tech		–		0	–	6	–	0

The 1946 Boston University Terriers football team was an American football team that represented Boston University as an independent during the 1946 college football season. In its second season under head coach Walt Holmer, the team compiled a 5–2–1 record.

Boston University ranked 14th nationally among small-college teams with an average of 260.1 yards per game in total offense. It also ranked 13th nationally in total defense, giving up an average of 161.9 yards per game.

== Schedule ==
Date	Time	Opponent	Site	Result	Attendance	Source
September 28		at Syracuse	Archbold Stadium; Syracuse, NY	L 6–41	32,000	
October 5	2:00 p.m.	American International	Nickerson Field; Weston, MA	W 21–0		
October 12	2:00 p.m.	at Northeastern	Huntington Field; Brookline, MA	W 27–0		
October 19	2:00 p.m.	Tufts	Nickerson Field; Weston, MA	W 35–0	6,000	
October 26		at Brown	Brown Stadium; Providence, RI	T 14–14	12,000	
November 2	2:00 p.m.	Rhode Island State	Nickerson Field; Weston, MA	W 39–6	4,000	
November 9	2:00 p.m.	New Hampshire	Nickerson Field; Weston, MA	L 7–13		
November 16		at Coast Guard	New London, CT	W 34–7	3,000	
All times are in Eastern time
