= 1946 Coast Guard Cadets football team =

American college football season

1946 Coast Guard Cadets football
- Conference: Independent
- Record: 3–5
- Head coach: Nelson Nitchman (1st season)

1946 Eastern non-major college football independents records
| | Conf. | | | Overall |
| Team | W | L | T | W | | L | | T |
|---|---|---|---|---|---|---|---|---|
| Thiel | | – | | 7 | – | 0 | – | 0 |
| Muhlenberg | | – | | 9 | – | 1 | – | 0 |
| Geneva | | – | | 7 | – | 1 | – | 0 |
| Dickinson | | – | | 6 | – | 1 | – | 0 |
| Alfred | | – | | 5 | – | 1 | – | 0 |
| Buffalo | | – | | 7 | – | 2 | – | 0 |
| Washington & Jefferson | | – | | 6 | – | 2 | – | 0 |
| Massachusetts State | | – | | 6 | – | 2 | – | 0 |
| Boston University | | – | | 5 | – | 2 | – | 1 |
| St. Lawrence | | – | | 5 | – | 2 | – | 0 |
| American International | | – | | 4 | – | 2 | – | 1 |
| Trinity (CT) | | – | | 4 | – | 2 | – | 0 |
| Swarthmore | | – | | 5 | – | 3 | – | 0 |
| Cortland State | | – | | 4 | – | 3 | – | 0 |
| Hofstra | | – | | 4 | – | 3 | – | 0 |
| Springfield | | – | | 4 | – | 4 | – | 0 |
| New York A&T | | – | | 3 | – | 3 | – | 0 |
| Northeastern | | – | | 3 | – | 3 | – | 0 |
| Scranton | | – | | 4 | – | 5 | – | 1 |
| Gettysburg | | – | | 4 | – | 5 | – | 0 |
| Drexel | | – | | 3 | – | 4 | – | 0 |
| Franklin & Marshall | | – | | 3 | – | 4 | – | 0 |
| Coast Guard | | – | | 3 | – | 5 | – | 0 |
| Tufts | | – | | 1 | – | 6 | – | 0 |
| CCNY | | – | | 1 | – | 7 | – | 0 |
| Carnegie Tech | | – | | 0 | – | 6 | – | 0 |

The 1946 Coast Guard Bears football team was an American football team that represented the United States Coast Guard Academy as an independent during the 1946 college football season. In their first season under head coach Nelson Nitchman, the team compiled a 3–5 record and were outscored by a total of 220 to 112.

The team played its home games in New London, Connecticut.

== Schedule ==
| Date | Opponent | Site | Result | Attendance | Source |
|---|---|---|---|---|---|
| September 28 | at Rensselaer Polytechnic | Hawkins Stadium; Albany, NY | W 33–0 | | |
| October 5 | at Amherst | Amherst, MA | W 14–13 | | |
| October 12 | Colby | New London, CT | W 18–12 | | |
| October 19 | at Harvard | Harvard Stadium; Boston, MA | L 0–69 | 15,000 | |
| October 26 | at Yale | Yale Bowl; New Haven, CT | L 14–47 | 10,000 | |
| November 2 | at Connecticut | Gardner Dow Athletic Field; Storrs, CT | L 13–27 | | |
| November 9 | Tufts | New London, CT | L 13–18 | | |
| November 16 | Boston University | New Haven, CT | L 7–34 | 3,000 | |
