= 1946 Geneva Covenanters football team =

American college football season

1946 Geneva Covenanters football
- Conference: Independent
- Record: 7–1
- Head coach: Alured Ransom (2nd season)
- Home stadium: Reeves Field

1946 Eastern non-major college football independents records
	Conf.			Overall
Team	W	L	T	W		L		T
Thiel		–		7	–	0	–	0
Muhlenberg		–		9	–	1	–	0
Geneva		–		7	–	1	–	0
Dickinson		–		6	–	1	–	0
Alfred		–		5	–	1	–	0
Buffalo		–		7	–	2	–	0
Washington & Jefferson		–		6	–	2	–	0
Massachusetts State		–		6	–	2	–	0
Boston University		–		5	–	2	–	1
St. Lawrence		–		5	–	2	–	0
American International		–		4	–	2	–	1
Trinity (CT)		–		4	–	2	–	0
Swarthmore		–		5	–	3	–	0
Cortland State		–		4	–	3	–	0
Hofstra		–		4	–	3	–	0
Springfield		–		4	–	4	–	0
New York A&T		–		3	–	3	–	0
Northeastern		–		3	–	3	–	0
Scranton		–		4	–	5	–	1
Gettysburg		–		4	–	5	–	0
Drexel		–		3	–	4	–	0
Franklin & Marshall		–		3	–	4	–	0
Coast Guard		–		3	–	5	–	0
Tufts		–		1	–	6	–	0
CCNY		–		1	–	7	–	0
Carnegie Tech		–		0	–	6	–	0

The 1946 Geneva Covenanters football team was an American football team that represented Geneva College as an independent during the 1946 college football season. In their second, non-consecutive season under head coach Alured Ransom, the Covenanters compiled a 7–1 record and outscored opponents by a total of 142 to 35.

The team played it home games at Reeves Field in Beaver Falls, Pennsylvania.

== Schedule ==
Date	Opponent	Site	Result	Attendance	Source
September 19	Youngstown	Reeves Field; Beaver Falls, PA	L 0–26	12,000	
September 28	at Waynesburg	Carmichaels High School Stadium; Waynesburg, PA	W 13–0		
October 5	Washington & Jefferson	Reeves Field; Beaver Falls, PA	W 12–0	6,000	
October 14	at Grove City	Grove City High School Field; Grove City, PA	W 30–6		
October 19	Bethany (WV)	Reeves Field; Beaver Falls, PA	W 19–0		
October 26	Carnegie Tech	Reeves Field; Beaver Falls, PA	W 36–0	2,500	
November 2	at Westminster (PA)	3,000; Farrell, PA	W 19–0		
November 9	Slippery Rock	Reeves Field; Beaver Falls, PA	W 13–3		
