= 1946 Thiel Tomcats football team =

American college football season

1946 Thiel Tomcats football
- Conference: Independent
- Record: 7–0
- Head coach: Jack Stoeber (11th season)
- Captains: Ralph Demi; John Vitale
- Home stadium: Packard Field

1946 Eastern non-major college football independents records
	Conf.			Overall
Team	W	L	T	W		L		T
Thiel		–		7	–	0	–	0
Muhlenberg		–		9	–	1	–	0
Geneva		–		7	–	1	–	0
Dickinson		–		6	–	1	–	0
Alfred		–		5	–	1	–	0
Buffalo		–		7	–	2	–	0
Washington & Jefferson		–		6	–	2	–	0
Massachusetts State		–		6	–	2	–	0
Boston University		–		5	–	2	–	1
St. Lawrence		–		5	–	2	–	0
American International		–		4	–	2	–	1
Trinity (CT)		–		4	–	2	–	0
Swarthmore		–		5	–	3	–	0
Cortland State		–		4	–	3	–	0
Hofstra		–		4	–	3	–	0
Springfield		–		4	–	4	–	0
New York A&T		–		3	–	3	–	0
Northeastern		–		3	–	3	–	0
Scranton		–		4	–	5	–	1
Gettysburg		–		4	–	5	–	0
Drexel		–		3	–	4	–	0
Franklin & Marshall		–		3	–	4	–	0
Coast Guard		–		3	–	5	–	0
Tufts		–		1	–	6	–	0
CCNY		–		1	–	7	–	0
Carnegie Tech		–		0	–	6	–	0

The 1946 Thiel Tomcats football team was an American football team that represented Thiel College in Greenville, Pennsylvania, as an independent during the 1946 college football season. In their eleventh year under head coach Jack Stoeber, the Tomcats compiled a perfect 7–0 record and outscored opponents by a total of 88 to 33. The team played its home game at Packard Field in Greenville, Pennsylvania.

In the fall of 1946, Thiel College had a total enrollment of only 450 students with 30 of them playing for the football team. The players had an average weight of between 165 and 170 pounds, and all but two of them were World War II veterans. Thirteen of the 30 players were locals from Greenville, and only two were from out of state. In describing the strength of the squad, Coach Stoeber emphasized teamwork over raw talent: "Although I have a squad of 30, the quality is not too good, and there are no outstanding individuals. The boys play together, and that is the answer for our good season."

The 1941 Thiel team also compiled an undefeated record, but the football program ceased competition during World War II. After a four-year hiatus, six players from the 1941 team returned to the 1946 team, including Joe DeFebo who served as an assistant coach. In all, Thiel won 15 consecutive games from 1941 to 1948.

In 1981, the team was inducted into the Thiel Athletic Hall of Fame. In its memorial to the 1946 team, Thiel Athletics note that "the 1946 team was forced to claw its way through", squeaking out narrow wins in a series of "cliff-hangers".

== Schedule ==
Date	Opponent	Site	Result	Attendance	Source
September 27	Butler Cubs	Packard Field; Greenville, PA	W 26–0		
October 5	at Hiram	Hiram, OH	W 14–6		
October 12	at Slippery Rock	Slippery Rock, PA	W 2–0		
October 19	Clarion	Packard Field; Greenville, PA	W 14–13		
October 26	at Edinboro	Edinboro, PA	W 7–0	2,000	
November 2	Allegheny	Packard Field; Greenville, PA	W 13–7		
November 9	Grove City	Packard Field; Greenville, PA	W 12–7		

== Roster ==
- Sam Scava
- Jim Trettle
- John Bright
- John Desport
- Paul Stegkamper
- David Spargo
- Jack Beer
- James Wallace
- Pete Battisti
- Emil Charles
- Carl Maurana
- Dale Bachman
- Richard Dennison
- Dom Ucchino
- Tony Fahl
- Burt Larsen
- Robert Himmelman
- Tony Donato
- George Dietrich,
- William Peterson
- Dominic Benedetto
- John Vitale
- Robert Dell
- Robert Driscole
- James Miller
- James Nichol
- Guyton Thigpen
- Bob Henderson
- John Boliver
- Ralph Demi
- Robert Denniston
