= 1946 Muhlenberg Mules football team =

American college football season

1946 Muhlenberg Mules football

Tobacco Bowl, W 26–25 vs. St. Bonaventure
- Conference: Independent
- Record: 9–1
- Head coach: Ben Schwartzwalder (1st season)
- Home stadium: Mulenberg Field

1946 Eastern non-major college football independents records
	Conf.			Overall
Team	W	L	T	W		L		T
Thiel		–		7	–	0	–	0
Muhlenberg		–		9	–	1	–	0
Geneva		–		7	–	1	–	0
Dickinson		–		6	–	1	–	0
Alfred		–		5	–	1	–	0
Buffalo		–		7	–	2	–	0
Washington & Jefferson		–		6	–	2	–	0
Massachusetts State		–		6	–	2	–	0
Boston University		–		5	–	2	–	1
St. Lawrence		–		5	–	2	–	0
American International		–		4	–	2	–	1
Trinity (CT)		–		4	–	2	–	0
Swarthmore		–		5	–	3	–	0
Cortland State		–		4	–	3	–	0
Hofstra		–		4	–	3	–	0
Springfield		–		4	–	4	–	0
New York A&T		–		3	–	3	–	0
Northeastern		–		3	–	3	–	0
Scranton		–		4	–	5	–	1
Gettysburg		–		4	–	5	–	0
Drexel		–		3	–	4	–	0
Franklin & Marshall		–		3	–	4	–	0
Coast Guard		–		3	–	5	–	0
Tufts		–		1	–	6	–	0
CCNY		–		1	–	7	–	0
Carnegie Tech		–		0	–	6	–	0

The 1946 Muhlenberg Mules football team was an American football team that represented Muhlenberg College during the 1946 college football season. In its first season under head coach Ben Schwartzwalder, Muhlenberg compiled a 9–1 record, defeated St. Bonaventure in the Tobacco Bowl, and outscored opponents by a total of 307 to 99. The team's only loss was to Delaware by a 20–12 score. The team played its home games at Muhlenberg Field in Allentown, Pennsylvania.

Muhlenberg ranked first nationally among small college programs with an average of 425.9 yards of total offense per game. The team also ranked fifth nationally in total defense, giving up an average of only 115.4 yards per game.

Muhlenberg fullback Jack Crider was the leading scorer among all college football players in the East with 90 points on 15 touchdowns in nine games. He also ranked fifth nationally.

== Schedule ==
Date	Opponent	Rank	Site	Result	Attendance	Source
September 28	at Lafayette		Fisher Field; Easton, PA	W 32–20	8,000	
October 5	Albright		Muhlenberg Field; Allentown, PA	W 39–0		
October 12	at Bucknell		Memorial Stadium; Lewisburg, PA	W 6–0		
October 19	Swarthmore		Muhlenberg Field; Allentown, PA	W 52–13		
October 26	Franklin & Marshall		Muhlenberg Field; Allentown, PA	W 40–7		
November 2	at Lehigh		Taylor Stadium; Bethlehem, PA	W 40–7	10,000	
November 9	at Gettysburg		Gettysburg, PA	W 13–7		
November 16	Moravian		Muhlenberg Field; Allentown, PA	W 47–0		
November 23	at No. 16 Delaware	No. T–19	Wilmington, DE	L 12–20	15,000	
December 14	vs. St. Bonaventure		Stoll Field; Lexington, KY (Tobacco Bowl)	W 26–25	3,000	
Rankings from AP Poll released prior to the game

== Rankings ==
Ranking movements Legend: ██ Increase in ranking ██ Decrease in ranking — = Not ranked т = Tied with team above or below
	Week								
Poll	1	2	3	4	5	6	7	8	Final
AP	—	—	—	—	—	—	19т	—	—

== After the season ==
The 1947 NFL draft was held on December 16, 1946. The following Mules were selected.

Round	Pick	Player	Position	NFL club
18	161	Hal Bell	Back	Philadelphia Eagles
27	254	George Bibighaus	End	New York Giants
