= 1946 Springfield Gymnasts football team =

American college football season

1946 Springfield Gymnasts football
- Conference: Independent
- Record: 4–4
- Head coach: Ossie Solem (1st season)
- Home stadium: Pratt Field

1946 Eastern non-major college football independents records
	Conf.			Overall
Team	W	L	T	W		L		T
Thiel		–		7	–	0	–	0
Muhlenberg		–		9	–	1	–	0
Geneva		–		7	–	1	–	0
Dickinson		–		6	–	1	–	0
Alfred		–		5	–	1	–	0
Buffalo		–		7	–	2	–	0
Washington & Jefferson		–		6	–	2	–	0
Massachusetts State		–		6	–	2	–	0
Boston University		–		5	–	2	–	1
St. Lawrence		–		5	–	2	–	0
American International		–		4	–	2	–	1
Trinity (CT)		–		4	–	2	–	0
Swarthmore		–		5	–	3	–	0
Cortland State		–		4	–	3	–	0
Hofstra		–		4	–	3	–	0
Springfield		–		4	–	4	–	0
New York A&T		–		3	–	3	–	0
Northeastern		–		3	–	3	–	0
Scranton		–		4	–	5	–	1
Gettysburg		–		4	–	5	–	0
Drexel		–		3	–	4	–	0
Franklin & Marshall		–		3	–	4	–	0
Coast Guard		–		3	–	5	–	0
Tufts		–		1	–	6	–	0
CCNY		–		1	–	7	–	0
Carnegie Tech		–		0	–	6	–	0

The 1946 Springfield Gymnasts football team, sometimes also referred to as the Maroons, was an American football team that represented Springfield College as an independent during the 1946 college football season. In their first season under head coach Ossie Solem, the Gymnasts compiled a 4–4 record and outscored opponents by a total of 110 to 69. The team played home games at Pratt Field in Springfield, Massachusetts. It was the program's first season since 1942, having gone on hiatus during World War II.

Solem had previously coached for three major football programs, Drake (1921–1931), Iowa (1932–1936), and Syracuse (1937–1945).

== Schedule ==
Date	Opponent	Site	Result	Attendance	Source
September 28	at Northeastern	Huntington Field; Boston, MA	L 0–6		
October 5	at Connecticut	Gardner Dow Athletic Field; Storrs, CT	L 0–25	3,500	
October 12	Norwich	Pratt Field; Springfield, MA	W 20–0	1,000	
October 19	at New Hampshire	Lewis Field; Durham, NH	W 14–6	7,000	
October 26	American International	Pratt Field; Springfield, MA	W 34–6	5,000	
November 2	at Wayne	Kenworth Stadium; Detroit, MI	L 6–12	1,794	
November 9	St. Lawrence	Springfield, MA	W 24–0		
November 16	Cortland	Springfield, MA	L 12–14		
