= 1946 Drexel Dragons football team =

American college football season

1946 Drexel Dragons football
- Conference: Independent
- Record: 3–4
- Head coach: Ralph Chase (1st season)
- Home stadium: Drexel Field

1946 Eastern non-major college football independents records
	Conf.			Overall
Team	W	L	T	W		L		T
Thiel		–		7	–	0	–	0
Muhlenberg		–		9	–	1	–	0
Geneva		–		7	–	1	–	0
Dickinson		–		6	–	1	–	0
Alfred		–		5	–	1	–	0
Buffalo		–		7	–	2	–	0
Washington & Jefferson		–		6	–	2	–	0
Massachusetts State		–		6	–	2	–	0
Boston University		–		5	–	2	–	1
St. Lawrence		–		5	–	2	–	0
American International		–		4	–	2	–	1
Trinity (CT)		–		4	–	2	–	0
Swarthmore		–		5	–	3	–	0
Cortland State		–		4	–	3	–	0
Hofstra		–		4	–	3	–	0
Springfield		–		4	–	4	–	0
New York A&T		–		3	–	3	–	0
Northeastern		–		3	–	3	–	0
Scranton		–		4	–	5	–	1
Gettysburg		–		4	–	5	–	0
Drexel		–		3	–	4	–	0
Franklin & Marshall		–		3	–	4	–	0
Coast Guard		–		3	–	5	–	0
Tufts		–		1	–	6	–	0
CCNY		–		1	–	7	–	0
Carnegie Tech		–		0	–	6	–	0

The 1946 Drexel Dragons football team was an American football team that represented the Drexel Institute of Technology (renamed Drexel University in 1970) as an independent during the 1946 college football season. In their first season under head coach Ralph Chase, the Dragons compiled a 3–4 record and were outscored by a total of 109 to 76.

On October 26, Drexel played at Delaware in the last game to be played at Frazer Field.

On November 9, Drexel was scheduled to play against Dickinson, however Dickinson was unable to play because a bus which had all of the team's equipment was erroneously sent to Pittsburgh. The error was discovered by the Dickinson football manager after the bus had left, and the bus was not flagged down until it had already reached Gettysburg, Pennsylvania. By that time, the bus would be unable to reach Philadelphia, Pennsylvania, where the game was to be played, in time. As a crowd of 2,000 fans awaited the game, Drexel attempted to outfit the Dickinson team with their spare equipment, however was unable to do so due to a lack of pads. The game was canceled by mutual agreement.

== Schedule ==
Date	Time	Opponent	Site	Result	Attendance	Source
September 27	Night	at West Chester	Wayne Field; West Chester, PA	L 0–12		
October 5	2:00 pm	Ursinus	Drexel Field; Philadelphia, PA	W 18–6	4,000	
October 12	2:00 pm	at CCNY	Lewisohn Stadium; New York, NY	W 19–0	1,000	
October 19	2:00 pm	Haverford	Drexel Field; Philadelphia, PA	W 33–20		
October 26		at Delaware	Frazer Field; Newark, DE	L 0–52	8,000	
November 2	2:00 pm	Johns Hopkins	Drexel Field; Philadelphia, PA	L 0–7	2,000	
November 9	2:00 pm	Dickinson^{†}	Drexel Field; Philadelphia, PA	Cancelled		
November 16		at Swarthmore		L 6–12	2,000	
^{†}Homecoming; All times are in Eastern time

== Roster ==
1946 Drexel Dragons football team roster
Players
Coaches
Offense

Pos.	#	Name	Class
QB	45	Joe Michaels
HB	36	Al Bednerik
HB	16	Jim Ostendarp	Fr
FB	38	Arnie Pearson
TE	53	Jim Faut
OT		Phil Schneider
G		Joe Kuder
C	69	Hugh Geiger
G	70	Fred Jordan
OT	55	George Hill
TE	35	George Horrocks
[[American football positions|]]		Hal Morehead
[[American football positions|]]		Jack Smith
[[American football positions|]]		Craig Smith
[[American football positions|]]		Dick Coffee
HB		George Durgin
HB		Eugene Saylor
HB		Grisson
HB		Cragg
OT		Bob Brocksbank
OT		Tom Young
G		Jake Michaels
G		Bill Barnes
TE		Bill Mickle

Defense

Pos.	#	Name	Class

Special teams

Pos.	#	Name	Class

Head coach

- Ralph Chase (Pittsburgh)

Coordinators/assistant coaches

- Edward Bossick (Muhlenberg)
- Marshall Austin (Drexel)

Legend

- (C) Team captain
- (S) Suspended
- (I) Ineligible
- Injured
- Redshirt
