= 1946 Buffalo Bulls football team =

American college football season

1946 Buffalo Bulls football
- Conference: Independent
- Record: 7–2
- Head coach: Jim Peele (8th season)
- Captain: Serofino Grottanelli
- Home stadium: Civic Stadium

1946 Eastern non-major college football independents records
| | Conf. | | | Overall |
| Team | W | L | T | W | | L | | T |
|---|---|---|---|---|---|---|---|---|
| Thiel | | – | | 7 | – | 0 | – | 0 |
| Muhlenberg | | – | | 9 | – | 1 | – | 0 |
| Geneva | | – | | 7 | – | 1 | – | 0 |
| Dickinson | | – | | 6 | – | 1 | – | 0 |
| Alfred | | – | | 5 | – | 1 | – | 0 |
| Buffalo | | – | | 7 | – | 2 | – | 0 |
| Washington & Jefferson | | – | | 6 | – | 2 | – | 0 |
| Massachusetts State | | – | | 6 | – | 2 | – | 0 |
| Boston University | | – | | 5 | – | 2 | – | 1 |
| St. Lawrence | | – | | 5 | – | 2 | – | 0 |
| American International | | – | | 4 | – | 2 | – | 1 |
| Trinity (CT) | | – | | 4 | – | 2 | – | 0 |
| Swarthmore | | – | | 5 | – | 3 | – | 0 |
| Cortland State | | – | | 4 | – | 3 | – | 0 |
| Hofstra | | – | | 4 | – | 3 | – | 0 |
| Springfield | | – | | 4 | – | 4 | – | 0 |
| New York A&T | | – | | 3 | – | 3 | – | 0 |
| Northeastern | | – | | 3 | – | 3 | – | 0 |
| Scranton | | – | | 4 | – | 5 | – | 1 |
| Gettysburg | | – | | 4 | – | 5 | – | 0 |
| Drexel | | – | | 3 | – | 4 | – | 0 |
| Franklin & Marshall | | – | | 3 | – | 4 | – | 0 |
| Coast Guard | | – | | 3 | – | 5 | – | 0 |
| Tufts | | – | | 1 | – | 6 | – | 0 |
| CCNY | | – | | 1 | – | 7 | – | 0 |
| Carnegie Tech | | – | | 0 | – | 6 | – | 0 |

The 1946 Buffalo Bulls football team was an American football team that represented the University of Buffalo as an independent during the 1946 college football season. In its eighth season under head coach Jim Peele, the team compiled a 7–2 record. The team played its home games at Civic Stadium in Buffalo, New York.

== Schedule ==
| Date | Opponent | Site | Result | Attendance | Source |
|---|---|---|---|---|---|
| September 28 | Moravian | Civic Stadium; Buffalo, NY | W 40–7 | 7,000 | |
| October 5 | at RPI | Troy, NY | W 28–13 | | |
| October 12 | at Hobart | Geneva, NY | W 20–7 | | |
| October 19 | Bucknell | Civic Stadium; Buffalo, NY | L 0–20 | | |
| October 25 | Wayne | Civic Stadium; Buffalo, NY | L 20–25 | 4,500 | |
| November 2 | at Bethany (WV) | Bethany, WV | W 32–6 | | |
| November 9 | Alfred | Civic Stadium; Buffalo, NY | W 20–12 | | |
| November 16 | at Carnegie Tech | Pittsburgh, PA | W 28–0 | | |
| November 23 | Johns Hopkins | Civic Stadium; Buffalo, NY | W 36–0 | | |
