= 1946 CCNY Beavers football team =

American college football season

1946 CCNY Beavers football
- Conference: Independent
- Record: 1–7
- Head coach: Louis Gebhard (2nd season)
- Home stadium: Lewisohn Stadium

1946 Eastern non-major college football independents records
	Conf.			Overall
Team	W	L	T	W		L		T
Thiel		–		7	–	0	–	0
Muhlenberg		–		9	–	1	–	0
Geneva		–		7	–	1	–	0
Dickinson		–		6	–	1	–	0
Alfred		–		5	–	1	–	0
Buffalo		–		7	–	2	–	0
Washington & Jefferson		–		6	–	2	–	0
Massachusetts State		–		6	–	2	–	0
Boston University		–		5	–	2	–	1
St. Lawrence		–		5	–	2	–	0
American International		–		4	–	2	–	1
Trinity (CT)		–		4	–	2	–	0
Swarthmore		–		5	–	3	–	0
Cortland State		–		4	–	3	–	0
Hofstra		–		4	–	3	–	0
Springfield		–		4	–	4	–	0
New York A&T		–		3	–	3	–	0
Northeastern		–		3	–	3	–	0
Scranton		–		4	–	5	–	1
Gettysburg		–		4	–	5	–	0
Drexel		–		3	–	4	–	0
Franklin & Marshall		–		3	–	4	–	0
Coast Guard		–		3	–	5	–	0
Tufts		–		1	–	6	–	0
CCNY		–		1	–	7	–	0
Carnegie Tech		–		0	–	6	–	0

The 1946 CCNY Beavers football team was an American football team that represented the City College of New York (CCNY) as an independent during the 1946 college football season. In their second season under head coach Louis Gebhard, the team compiled a 1–7 record.

== Schedule ==
Date	Opponent	Site	Result	Attendance	Source
September 28	at Susquehanna	Selinsgrove, PA	L 7–13	5,000	
October 5	West Chester	Lewisohn Stadium; New York, NY	L 0–20		
October 12	Drexel	Lewisohn Stadium; New York, NY	L 0–19	1,000	
October 19	at Franklin & Marshall	Williamson Field; Lancaster, PA	L 0–49	6,000	
October 26	Wagner	Lewisohn Stadium; New York, NY	W 27–6		
November 2	at Brooklyn	Ebbets Field; Brooklyn, NY	L 8–12	15,000	
November 9	at Massachusetts State	Alumni Field; Amherst, MA	L 0–59	1,500	
November 16	East Stroudsburg	Lewisohn Stadium; New York, NY	L 0–27		
