= Walter Hargesheimer =

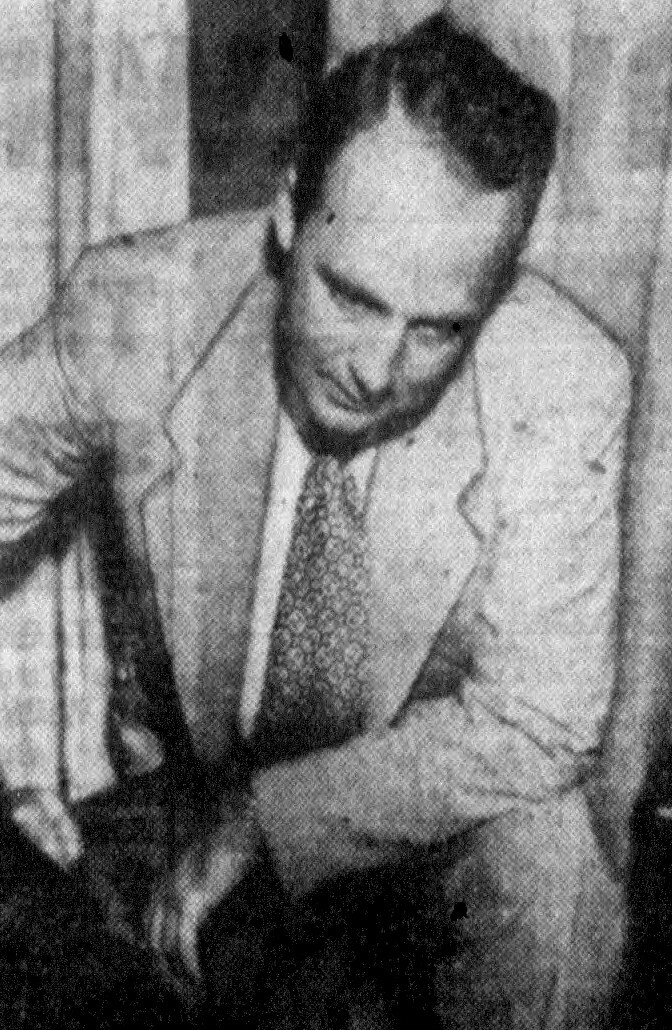
- Hargesheimer, circa 1949

Biographical details
- Born: August 10, 1912; Olmsted County, Minnesota, U.S.
- Died: May 18, 1996 (aged 83)

Playing career

Football
- 1932–1933: Minnesota
- Position: Back

Coaching career (HC unless noted)

Football
- 1935–1936: Sioux Falls
- 1937–1939: Oberlin (backfield)
- 1940: Highland Park HS (IL)
- 1941–1942: Massachusetts State
- 1946: Massachusetts State
- 1947–1948: Oklahoma (assistant)
- 1949–1952: USC (assistant)

Basketball
- 1935–1936: Sioux Falls
- 1937–1940: Oberlin
- 1940–1941: Highland Park HS (IL)
- 1941–1943: Massachusetts State
- 1946–1947: Massachusetts State

Head coaching record
- Overall: 15–22–2 (college football); 28–58 (college basketball)

Walter Gould Hargesheimer (August 10, 1912 – May 18, 1996) was an American football player and coach of football and basketball. He served as the head football coach at Sioux Falls College, now the University of Sioux Falls, from 1935 to 1936 and at Massachusetts State College, now the University of Massachusetts Amherst, from 1941 to 1942 and again in 1946.

Hargesheimer played football at the University of Minnesota, from which he graduated in 1934, as a back for the Golden Gophers in 1932 and 1933. After coaching football at Sioux Falls College in 1935 and 1936, he was the backfield coach and varsity basketball coach at Oberlin College from 1937 to 1940. He then coached football, basketball, and track at Highland Park High School in Highland Park, Illinois, before taking the appointment of head football coach and Professor of Physical Education at Massachusetts State College in January 1941.

== Head coaching record ==
=== College football ===
Year	Team	Overall	Conference	Standing
Sioux Falls Braves (South Dakota Intercollegiate Conference) (1935–1936)
1935	Sioux Falls	4–4	3–3	5th
1936	Sioux Falls	0–7–1	0–5–1	10th
Sioux Falls:		4–11–1	3–8–1	
Massachusetts State Aggies (Independent) (1941–1942)
1941	Massachusetts State	3–4–1		
1942	Massachusetts State	2–5		
Massachusetts State Aggies (Independent) (1946)
1946	Massachusetts State	6–2		
Massachusetts State:		11–11–1		
Total:		15–22–2		

=== College basketball ===
Record table
Season	Team	Overall	Conference	Standing	Postseason
Sioux Falls Cougars (South Dakota Intercollegiate Conference) (1935–1936)
1935–36	Sioux Falls	6–6			
Sioux Falls:		6–6 (.500)			
Oberlin Yeomen (Independent) (1937–1940)
1937–38	Oberlin	3–10			
1938–39	Oberlin	3–10			
1939–40	Oberlin	3–11			
Oberlin:		9–31 (.225)			
Massachusetts State Aggies (Independent) (1941–1943)
1941–42	Massachusetts State	8–6			
1942–43	Massachusetts State	5–8			
Massachusetts State Aggies (Independent) (1946–1947)
1946–47	Massachusetts State	0–7 (Note: Lorin Ball coached the final nine games of the season.)			
Massachusetts State:		13–21 (.382)			
Total:		28–58 (.326)			
