= Louis Gebhard =

American football player and coach (1902–1971)

Biographical details
- Born: September 15, 1902
- Died: September 19, 1971 (aged 69); Easthampton, Massachusetts, U.S.

Playing career

Football
- 1922–1925: Lafayette
- 1926: Philadelphia Quakers
- Position: Defensive back

Coaching career (HC unless noted)

Football
- 1945–1946: CCNY

Louis A. "Red" Gebhard (September 15, 1902 – September 19, 1971) was an American football player and coach. He played college football at Lafayette College. Gebhard was the head football coach at City College of New York (CCNY) from 1945 to 1946. He coached high school football in New Jersey for 18 seasons prior to being hired at CCNY.

== Head coaching record ==
Year	Team	Overall	Conference	Standing	Bowl/playoffs
CCNY Beavers (Independent) (1945–1946)
1945	CCNY	0–8			
1946	CCNY	1–7			
CCNY:		1–15			
Total:		1–15			
