= Jack Stoeber =

American football player and coach (1898–1971)

Biographical details
- Born: July 21, 1898; Reading, Pennsylvania, U.S.
- Died: November 19, 1971 (aged 73); Pittsburgh, Pennsylvania, U.S.
- Education: Springfield College; Columbia University

Playing career

Football
- 1923–1924: Springfield

Coaching career (HC unless noted)

Football
- 1925–1931: Thiel (line)
- 1932–1954: Thiel

Basketball
- 1932–1949: Thiel

Administrative career (AD unless noted)
- 1925–1957: Thiel

Head coaching record
- Overall: 75–54–6 (football)

John Bernhard Stoeber (July 21, 1898 – November 19, 1971) was an American college football player and coach.

== Early life ==
John Bernhard Stoeber was born on July 21, 1898, in Reading, Pennsylvania.

Stoeber starred in athletics at Reading High School and graduated from there in 1917. He also took up athletics in Springfield College in Springfield, Massachusetts, and graduated with a bachelor of physical education in 1925. He attended Columbia University from 1930 to 1931 and from 1934 to 1935 and attained a Master of Arts degree. He continued his education and took part in classes and coaching clinics at 10 different schools in his life. While in college, he was a student instructor in football, gymnastics and track in Springfield.

== Career ==
From 1921 to 1924, Stoeber was a playground supervisor in Reading and Wyomissing. In 1925, he joined Thiel College as a professor of physical education. He served as the head football coach from 1932 to 1954, compiling a record of 75–54–6. He also coached baseball, tennis, track, swimming, wrestling, boxing, soccer, and cross country at Thiel. He was a professor of German at the school from 1940 to 1945 and the dean of men from 1946 to 1962. He was president of the Greenville Recreation Association from 1925 to 1957. He supervised three playgrounds in Greenville.

== Personal life ==
Stober married Allison Keck of Greenville on December 11, 1928. He had two sons and two daughters, J. Bernard, Frederick V., Joan and Nancy. He was a member by letter of Holy Trinity Lutheran Church and was confirmed at St. John's Evangelical Lutheran Church in Reading. He was Sunday school teacher of Olivet Community Church in Springfield.

Stoeber died on November 19, 1971, at Allegheny General Hospital in Pittsburgh, Pennsylvania.

== Legacy ==
The home field at Thiel is named in his honor. He was named to the Springfield College all-time football team.

== Head coaching record ==
=== Football ===
Year	Team	Overall	Conference	Standing	Bowl/playoffs
Thiel Tomcats (Tri-State Conference) (1932–1933)
1932	Thiel	3–6	1–3	5th	
1933	Thiel	3–4	2–3	4th	
Thiel Tomcats (Independent) (1934–1954)
1934	Thiel	5–2			
1935	Thiel	4–2			
1936	Thiel	3–3			
1937	Thiel	2–4–1			
1938	Thiel	1–5–2			
1939	Thiel	4–4			
1930	Thiel	4–4			
1941	Thiel	7–0			
1942	No team—World War II				
1943	No team—World War II				
1944	No team—World War II				
1945	No team—World War II				
1946	Thiel	7–0			
1947	Thiel	4–3			
1948	Thiel	4–3–1			
1949	Thiel	3–3–1			
1950	Thiel	7–0			
1951	Thiel	3–2–1			
1952	Thiel	1–5			
1953	Thiel	5–2			
1954	Thiel	5–2			
Thiel:		75–54–6	3–6		
Total:		75–54–6			
