= Lew Elverson =

American football coach (1912–1997)

Biographical details
- Born: November 13, 1912; Philadelphia, Pennsylvania, U.S.
- Died: May 1, 1997 (aged 84); Wynnewood, Pennsylvania, U.S.

Playing career

Football
- 1934–1936: Penn
- Positions: Quarterback, halfback

Coaching career (HC unless noted)

Football
- 1937: Swarthmore (freshmen)
- 1938–1941: Swarthmore
- 1943–1944: Atlantic City NAS
- 1946–1972: Swarthmore
- 1974: Swarthmore

Track and field
- 1951–1978: Swarthmore

Head coaching record
- Overall: 102–135–7 (football)

Accomplishments and honors

Championships
- Football; 2 MAC Southern College Division (1965–1966)

Lewis Henry Elverson (November 13, 1912 – May 1, 1997) was an American college football player and coach, track and field coach, and college athletics administrator. He played college football at the University of Pennsylvania from 1934 to 1936 and was the head football coach at Swarthmore College for 32 seasons over three stints, starting in 1938 and ending in 1974.

== Early years ==
Elverson attended Toms River High School in Toms River, New Jersey, where he competed for the baseball, basketball, football, and track teams. He also attended the Hun School of Princeton where competed for the football and rowing teams.

Elverson moved on to the University of Pennsylvania, where he played college football at the quarterback and halfback positions for the Penn Quakers from 1934 to 1936 and was captain of the 1936 team that compiled a 7–1 record and was ranked No. 10 in the final AP Poll. He was a member of Penn's "Destiny Backfield" during those years.

== Coaching career ==
Elverson was hired as the freshman football coach at Swarthmore College in August 1937. In May 1938, he was promoted to head football coach at Swarthmore. In 1939, he led Swarthmore to the first undefeated season in school history.

His career at Swarthmore was interrupted by service as a lieutenant commander in the United States Navy during World War II from 1942 to 1945. During the war, he coached the Atlantic City Naval Air Station football team in 1943 and 1944.

Elverson returned to Swarthmore after the war and served as the school's head football coach for a total of 32 seasons, ending with the 1972 and 1974 seasons. He compiled a record of 96–130–7 as Swarthmore's head football coach.

Elverson served as the coach of Swarthmore's track team from 1951 to 1978 and for several years as the school's athletic director. He was also a professor of physical education at the college.

== Later years ==
Elverson died from congestive heart failure, on May 1, 1997, at Lankenau Hospital in Wynnewood, Pennsylvania.

== Head coaching record ==
=== Football ===
Year	Team	Overall	Conference	Standing	Bowl/playoffs
Swarthmore Garnet Tide (Independent) (1938–1941)
1938	Swarthmore	5–1–1			
1939	Swarthmore	6–0–1			
1940	Swarthmore	5–2			
1941	Swarthmore	3–3			
Atlantic City Naval Air Station Hellcats/Corsairs (Independent) (1942–1943)
1943	Atlantic City NAS	1–3 (Note: Ducky Pond began the 1943 season as head coach of the Willow Grove Naval Air Station team. In October, after the Hellcats' first game, the entire team, aside from Pond, was transferred from Willow Grove Naval Air Station to Atlantic City Naval Air Station. Elverson was elevated to head coach after the transfer. The team finished the season with an overall record of 2–3.)			
1944	Atlantic City NAS	5–2			
Atlantic City NAS:		6–5			
Swarthmore Garnet Tide (Independent) (1946–1957)
1946	Swarthmore	5–3			
1947	Swarthmore	4–4			
1948	Swarthmore	2–4–1			
1949	Swarthmore	2–5–1			
1950	Swarthmore	1–6			
1951	Swarthmore	2–5			
1952	Swarthmore	3–4			
1953	Swarthmore	4–3			
1954	Swarthmore	3–3–1			
1955	Swarthmore	2–6			
1956	Swarthmore	3–3–1			
1957	Swarthmore	3–4			
Swarthmore Garnet Tide (Middle Atlantic Conference) (1958–1972)
1958	Swarthmore	1–7	1–4	T–4th (Southern College)	
1959	Swarthmore	2–5	1–3	NA (Southern College)	
1960	Swarthmore	2–5	2–3	5th (Southern College)	
1961	Swarthmore	5–2	4–2	T–2nd (Southern College)	
1962	Swarthmore	5–2	4–2	T–3rd (Southern College)	
1963	Swarthmore	4–3	4–2	4th (Southern College)	
1964	Swarthmore	3–4	3–3	T–4th (Southern College)	
1965	Swarthmore	6–1	6–0	1st (Southern College)	
1966	Swarthmore	6–0–1	6–0–1	1st (Southern College)	
1967	Swarthmore	3–5	3–5	T–4th (Southern College)	
1968	Swarthmore	1–7	1–6	T–8th (Southern College)	
1969	Swarthmore	3–5	3–5	8th (Southern College)	
1970	Swarthmore	2–6	2–6	10th (Southern)	
1971	Swarthmore	0–8	0–8	11th (Southern)	
1972	Swarthmore	0–7	1–7 (Note: Swarthmore received a forfeit win from Haverford, which counted in the conference standings, but not toward the team's overall record.)	9th (Southern)	
Swarthmore Garnet Tide (Middle Atlantic Conference) (1974)
1974	Swarthmore	0–7	0–7	10th (Southern)	
Swarthmore:		96–130–7	41–63–1		
Total:		102–135–7			
National championship Conference title Conference division title or championship game berth
