= Alured Ransom =

American athletics coach and sports educator (1908–1992)

Biographical details
- Born: November 12, 1908; Pennsylvania, U.S.
- Died: January 13, 1992 (aged 83); California, U.S.

Playing career

Football
- 1928–1932: Geneva

Coaching career (HC unless noted)

Football
- 1941: Geneva
- 1946–1948: Geneva
- 1950–1951: Washington & Jefferson
- 1952–1954: Dickinson

Basketball
- 1941–1942: Geneva
- 1946–1949: Geneva
- 1952–1955: Dickinson

Head coaching record
- Overall: 30–41–2 (football); 70–76 (basketball)

Alured Chaffee "Slim" Ransom (November 12, 1908-January 13, 1992) was an American athletics coach and sports educator who helped develop physical education programs in Afghanistan. In the United States he was a college football and basketball coach, coaching from 1941 until 1954. His career football coaching record was 30–41–2 with a winning percentage of .411. He also spent some time coaching and as an athletic director at the high school level.

== International impact ==
Ransom was selected by the Asia Foundation to help develop physical education programs in Afghanistan for secondary schools and colleges. His work as an advisor to the minister of education in Afghanistan went for two years and included advising schools in the creation of facilities and preparation of instructors.

== Playing career ==
Ransom was a graduate of and played football for Geneva College, where he earned 12 varsity letters. While at Geneva, he earned a Bachelor of Science in education. In 1939 he earned a Master of Education from the University of Pittsburgh.

== Coaching career ==
=== Geneva ===
Prior to coaching at Dickinson, Ransom was the 19th head football coach at Geneva College in Beaver Falls, Pennsylvania and he held that position for four seasons, for the 1941 season, and then returned for 1946 until 1948. His coaching record at Geneva was 20–12–2. Geneva awarded a "Distinguished Service Award" to him in 1982. His coaching was interrupted by World War II and his military service (see entry below).

=== Washington & Jefferson ===
Ransom also coached at Washington & Jefferson College from 1950 to 1951, posting a losing record of 3–11, with the 1950 team compiling a winless 0–8 record.

=== Dickinson ===
Ransom was the 27th head football coach at Dickinson College in Carlisle, Pennsylvania and he held that position for three seasons, from 1952 until 1954. His football coaching record at Dickinson was 8–17. This ranks him 13th at Dickinson in terms of total wins and 24th at Dickinson in terms of winning percentage. He also was the basketball coach at Dickinson from 1953 through 1955, accumulating a 21–35 record.

== Military service ==
Ransom served in the United States Navy as a Lieutenant Commander aboard the USS Bataan as a gunnery officer. He saw action during World War II while in the Navy from 1942 until 1946.

== Head coaching record ==
=== Football ===
Year	Team	Overall	Conference	Standing	Bowl/playoffs
Geneva Covenanters (Independent) (1941)
1941	Geneva	4–3–2			
Geneva Covenanters (Independent) (1946–1948)
1946	Geneva	7–1			
1947	Geneva	7–2			
1948	Geneva	2–6			
Geneva:		20–12–2			
Washington & Jefferson Presidents (Independent) (1950–1951)
1950	Washington & Jefferson	0–8			
1951	Washington & Jefferson	3–3			
Washington & Jefferson:		3–11			
Dickinson Red Devils (Independent) (1952–1954)
1952	Dickinson	3–6			
1953	Dickinson	3–5			
1954	Dickinson	2–6			
Dickinson:		8–17			
Total:		30–14–2			
