= Georgia Pre-Flight Skycrackers football =

US Navy football team, 1942–1944

- First season: 1942
- Last season: 1944
- All-time record: 16–7–1 (.688)

The Georgia Pre-Flight Skycrackers represented the U.S. Navy pre-flight school at the University of Georgia in the college football seasons of 1942, 1943, and 1944.

== History ==
The United States Navy commissioned pre-flight schools at the University of Georgia, the University of Iowa, the University of North Carolina at Chapel Hill, and Saint Mary's College of California in 1942. Cadets were given three months of rigorous physical training and instruction in basic aerial navigation and communications. Graduates were sent to basic flight schools and advanced flight training before assignment to the Pacific Fleet.

Athletics and training were emphasized at the schools. It was believed that the rigors of college football were ideal preparation for World War II. Numerous collegiate and professional athletes and coaches were recruited as instructors. They often played on or coached the football team of their respective school. Each team usually played established football powers in their respective region and other service academies.

Georgia Pre-Flight was coached by Raymond Wolf in 1942 and compiled a record of 7–1–1, which helped the team be ranked No. 3 among the service teams in a poll of 91 sports writers conducted by the Associated Press. The Skycrackers were also known for having future College Football Hall of Fame inductee Bear Bryant serve as an assistant coach in 1942. Bryant went on to coach at Maryland, Kentucky, Texas A&M and Alabama, and during his career won the 1961, 1964, 1965, 1973, 1978 and 1979 national championships and compiled an overall record of 323 wins, 85 losses and 17 ties (323–85–17). In 1943, Rex Enright was the head coach and compiled a 5-1 record. And in 1944, first-year head coach Ducky Pond led the team to a 4-5 record.

== See also ==
- List of World War II military service football teams
