= 1943 Atlantic City Naval Air Station Hellcats football team =

American college football season

1943 Atlantic City Naval Air Station Hellcats football
- Conference: Independent
- Record: 2–3
- Head coach: Ducky Pond (1st season; first game); Lew Elverson (1st season, final 4 games)

1943 military service football records
	Conf.			Overall
Team	W	L	T	W		L		T
No. 17 Bainbridge		–		7	–	0	–	0
Bunker Hill NAS		–		6	–	0	–	0
Greensboro		–		4	–	0	–	0
Memphis NATTC		–		2	–	0	–	0
No. 2 Iowa Pre-Flight		–		9	–	1	–	0
No. 10 March Field		–		9	–	1	–	0
No. 8 Del Monte Pre-Flight		–		7	–	1	–	0
Randolph Field		–		9	–	1	–	1
Georgia Pre-Flight		–		5	–	1	–	0
No. 6 Great Lakes Navy		–		10	–	2	–	0
Lubbock AAF		–		5	–	1	–	0
Ottumwa NAS		–		5	–	1	–	0
Camp Davis		–		8	–	2	–	0
Sampson NTS		–		7	–	2	–	0
San Diego NTS		–		7	–	2	–	0
Keesler Field		–		3	–	1	–	0
Wright Field		–		1	–	0	–	1
Camp Lejeune		–		6	–	2	–	1
Fort Riley		–		6	–	2	–	1
Kearns Field		–		5	–	2	–	0
Fort Knox		–		4	–	2	–	0
Cherry Point Marines		–		4	–	2	–	1
Alameda Coast Guard		–		4	–	2	–	1
Fort Douglas		–		4	–	2	–	1
300th Infantry		–		5	–	3	–	0
176th Infantry		–		4	–	3	–	0
Blackland AAF		–		4	–	3	–	0
Fort Sheridan		–		4	–	3	–	0
Fort Warren		–		4	–	3	–	0
Norman NAS		–		4	–	3	–	0
Charleston Coast Guard		–		5	–	4	–	0
Salt Lake AAB		–		4	–	3	–	2
124th Infantry		–		2	–	2	–	0
Camp Kilmer		–		2	–	2	–	0
Camp Lee		–		5	–	5	–	0
Logan Navy		–		2	–	2	–	0
Spokane Air Service		–		2	–	2	–	0
Camp Edwards		–		4	–	5	–	0
Curtis Bay Coast Guard		–		4	–	5	–	0
Saint Mary's Pre-Flight		–		3	–	4	–	1
Jacksonville NATTC		–		3	–	4	–	0
Richmond AAB		–		4	–	6	–	1
Atlantic City NAS		–		2	–	3	–	0
North Carolina Pre-Flight		–		2	–	4	–	1
Patterson Field		–		2	–	4	–	1
Bowman Field		–		2	–	4	–	0
Kirtland Field		–		1	–	2	–	0
Lakehurst NAS		–		2	–	4	–	0
Camp Grant		–		2	–	6	–	2
Lowry Field		–		1	–	3	–	0
Fort Monroe		–		3	–	7	–	0
Daniel Field		–		2	–	7	–	0
Camp Gordon		–		1	–	4	–	0
South Plains AAF		–		1	–	4	–	0
Greenville AAB		–		1	–	5	–	0
Ward Island Marines		–		1	–	5	–	0
Bryan AAF		–		1	–	6	–	0
Pocatello AAB		–		0	–	3	–	0
Norfolk Fleet Marines		–		0	–	9	–	0
Rankings from AP Poll

The 1943 Atlantic City Naval Air Station Hellcats football team, also called the "Cadets", represented the United States Navy's Atlantic City Naval Air Station (Atlantic City NAS), located in Pomona, New Jersey, during the 1943 college football season. The team began the season representing Willow Grove Naval Air Station (Willow Grove NAS) with Ducky Pond as head coach. In October the team was transferred to Atlantic City NAS, and Lew Elverson was elevated to head coach. Pond was not among the personnel transferred. Ensign Jim Morgan, who had played college football at Ohio Wesleyan University, was an assistant coach for the team. The team finished the season with an overall record of 2–3.

In the final Litkenhous Ratings, Atlantic City NAS ranked 119th among the nation's college and service teams with a rating of 60.0.

== Schedule ==
Date	Time	Opponent	Site	Result	Attendance	Source
October 9		at Ursinus	Patterson Field; Collegeville, PA	W 6–0		
October 16		at Lafayette	Fisher Field; Easton, PA	L 0–12		
November 6	2:00 p.m.	at Muhlenberg	Muhlenberg Field; Allentown, PA	W 21–7		
November 13		at Franklin & Marshall	Williamson Field; Lancaster, PA	L 7–20	2,500	
November 20		at Swarthmore	Alumni Field; Swarthmore, PA	L 6–13	1,500	
All times are in Eastern time
