= List of State University of New York units =

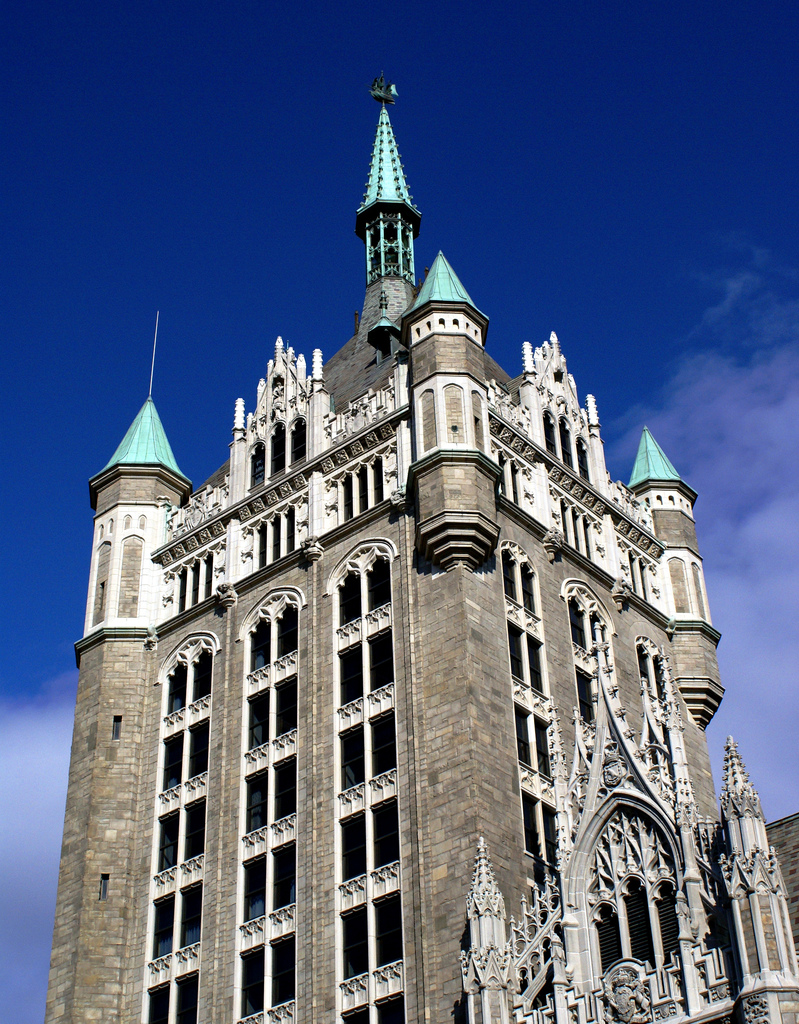
The main tower of the SUNY System Administration Building

There are a large variety of campus types and programs in the SUNY system; each site overlaps somewhat in specialties. SUNY divides its campuses into four categories: university centers / doctoral-granting institutions, comprehensive colleges, technology colleges, and community colleges. SUNY also has a unique relationship with its statutory colleges, which embed state-owned, state-funded colleges within other institutions such as Cornell University and Alfred University. Students at the statutory colleges pay tuition at a state-subsidized rate and are considered students of the private institutions in which the state-funded colleges are embedded.

SUNY and the City University of New York are different university systems, even though both are public institutions that receive funding from New York State. SUNY should not be confused with the University of the State of New York (USNY), which is the governmental umbrella organization for most education-related institutions and many education-related personnel (both public and private) in New York State, and which includes, as a component, the New York State Education Department.

The State University of New York at Potsdam, founded in 1816, is the oldest institution in the system. Empire State College, founded in 1971, is the most recent addition to the SUNY system. In terms of enrollment, the largest institution is the University at Buffalo, with over 31,656 students, and the smallest member is the College of Optometry, with 388 students. In terms of area, Stony Brook University is the largest public university in the state of New York.

All of the SUNY schools are accredited by the Middle States Association of Colleges and Schools, in addition to other program-specific accreditations held by individual campuses such as the Association to Advance Collegiate Schools of Business and the Association of Collegiate Business Schools and Programs. The system's central administration is in Albany, New York, in the Old Delaware and Hudson Railroad Company Building.

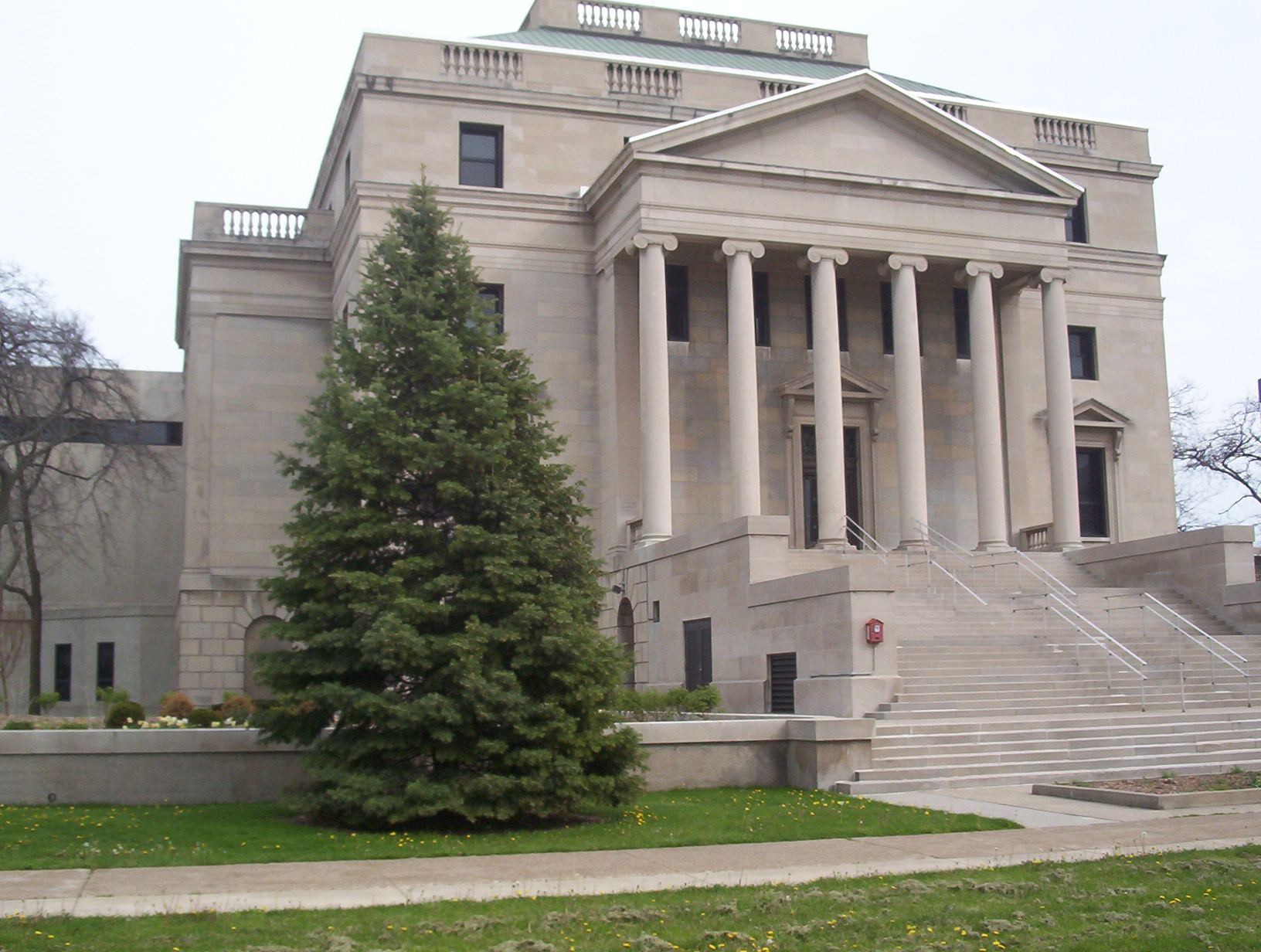
Abbot Hall on the South Campus of the University at Buffalo

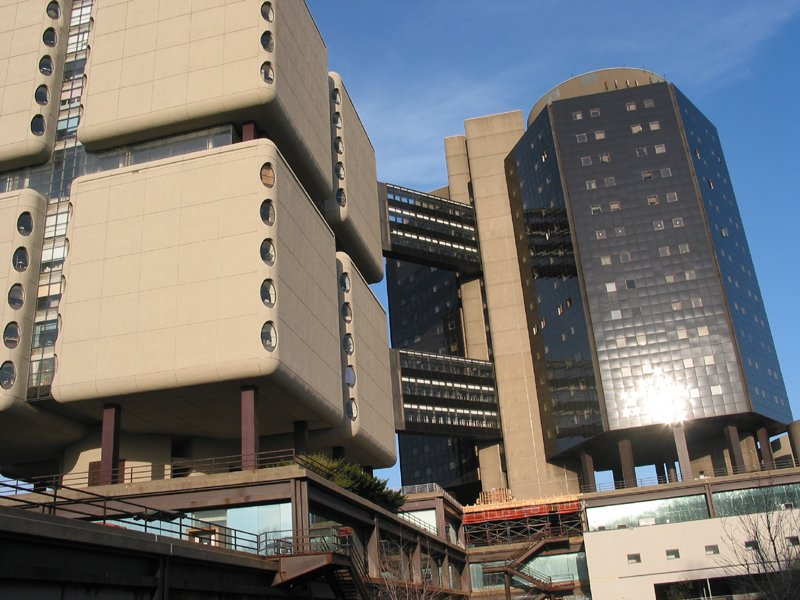
Stony Brook University Hospital

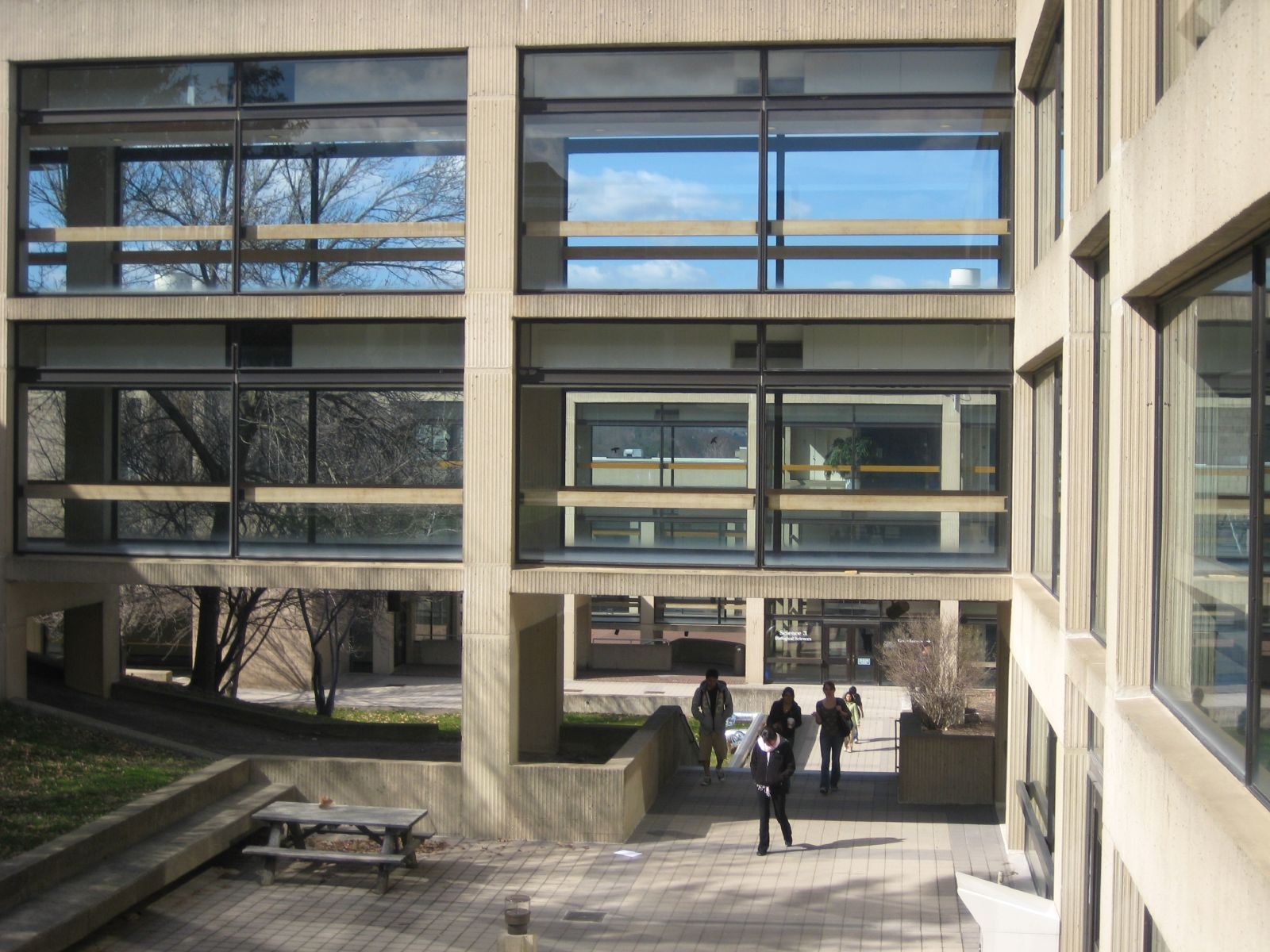
Science Library at Binghamton University

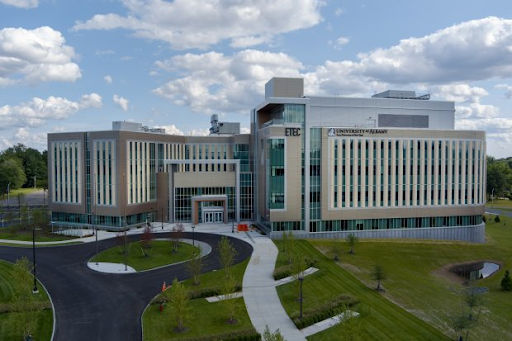
ETEC at University at Albany

== University centers and doctoral degree-granting institutions ==
Name	Location	County	Founded (Note: Each college's founding year is linked to the category of all schools founded in that year.)	Enrollment (Note: as of Fall 2025) undergraduate / graduate	Athletics	References
Binghamton University	Vestal	Broome	1946	14,559 / 4,093	NCAA Division I	(Note: University Center)
New York State College of Agriculture and Life Sciences at Cornell University	Ithaca	Tompkins	1874	6,526 / 2,826	NCAA Division I (Cornell University)	(Note: Statutory college at Cornell University)
New York State College of Human Ecology at Cornell University	Ithaca	Tompkins	1925	6,526 / 2,826	NCAA Division I (Cornell University)	
New York State School of Industrial and Labor Relations at Cornell University	Ithaca	Tompkins	1945	6,526 / 2,826	NCAA Division I (Cornell University)	
New York State College of Veterinary Medicine at Cornell University	Ithaca	Tompkins	1894	6,526 / 2,826	NCAA Division I (Cornell University)	
New York State College of Ceramics at Alfred University	Alfred	Allegany	1900	441 / 74	NCAA Division III (Alfred University)	(Note: Statutory college at Alfred University)
State University of New York College of Environmental Science and Forestry	Syracuse (Note: Students share campus facilities with Syracuse University)	Onondaga	1911	1,860 / 367	USCAA	
State University of New York College of Optometry	New York City	New York	1970	0 / 388	N/A	
SUNY Downstate Health Sciences University	New York City	Kings	1858	288 / 1,971	N/A	
Stony Brook University	Stony Brook	Suffolk	1957	18,632 / 8,620	NCAA Division I	
SUNY Polytechnic Institute	Utica	Oneida	1966	2,181 / 710	NCAA Division III	(Note: Originally a graduate and upper-division institution)
University at Albany	Albany	Albany	1844	12,889 / 4,537	NCAA Division I	
University at Buffalo	Buffalo	Erie	1846	21,196 / 10,460	NCAA Division I	
State University of New York Upstate Medical University	Syracuse	Onondaga	1834	207 / 1,235	N/A	(Note: Originally Geneva Medical College; later part of Syracuse University)

== Comprehensive Colleges ==
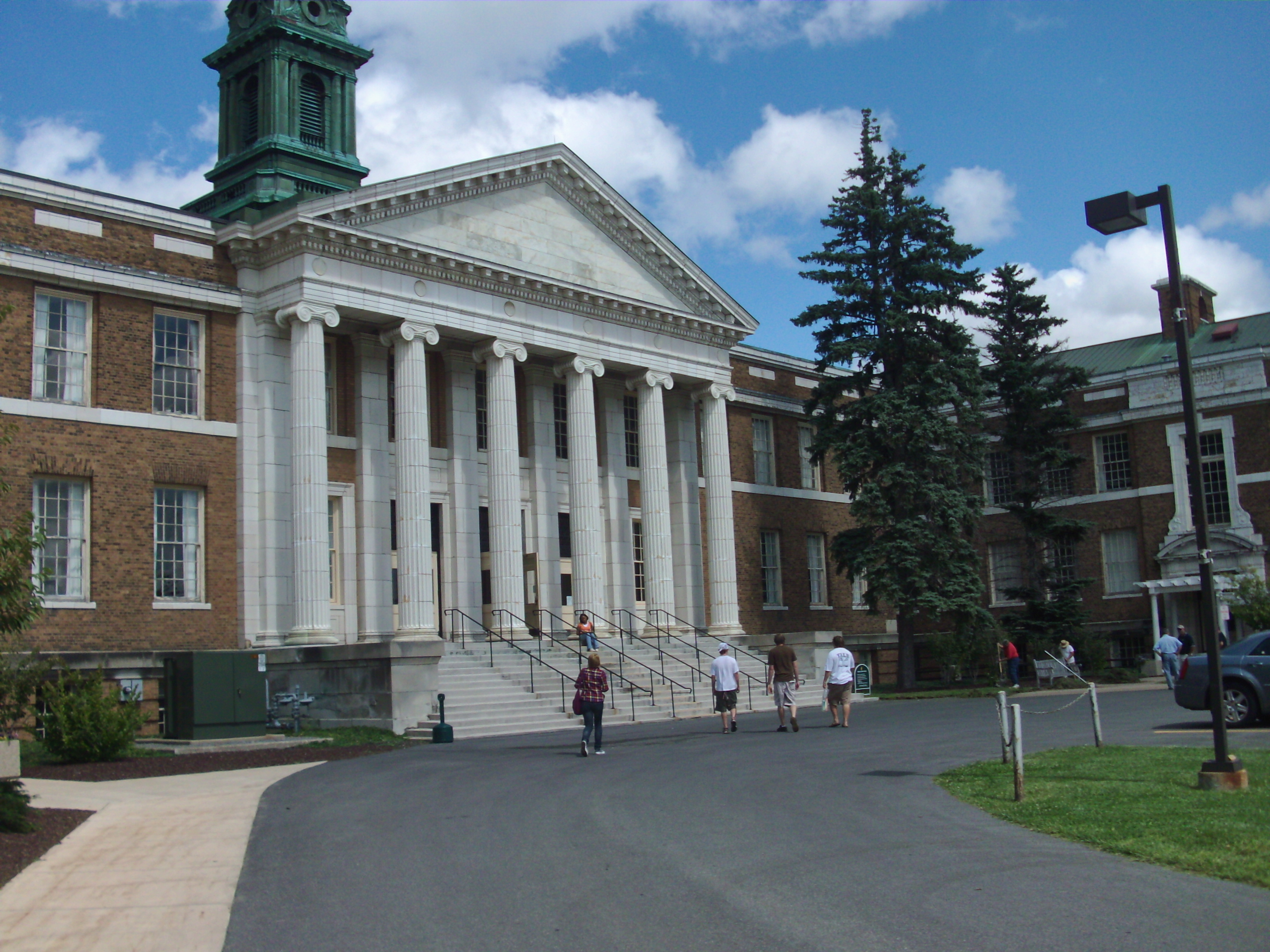
Sheldon Hall at SUNY Oswego

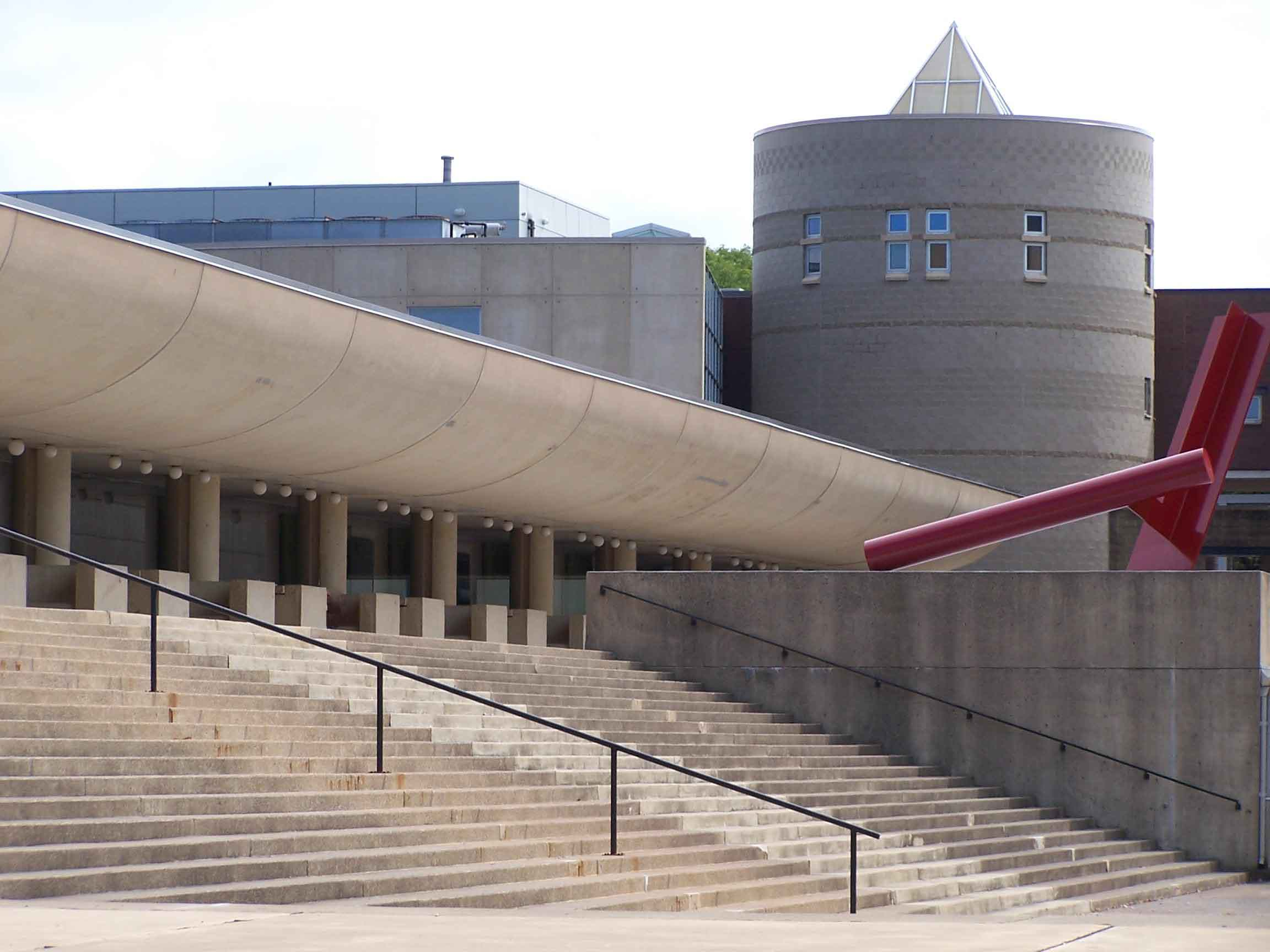
The Reed Library at SUNY Fredonia

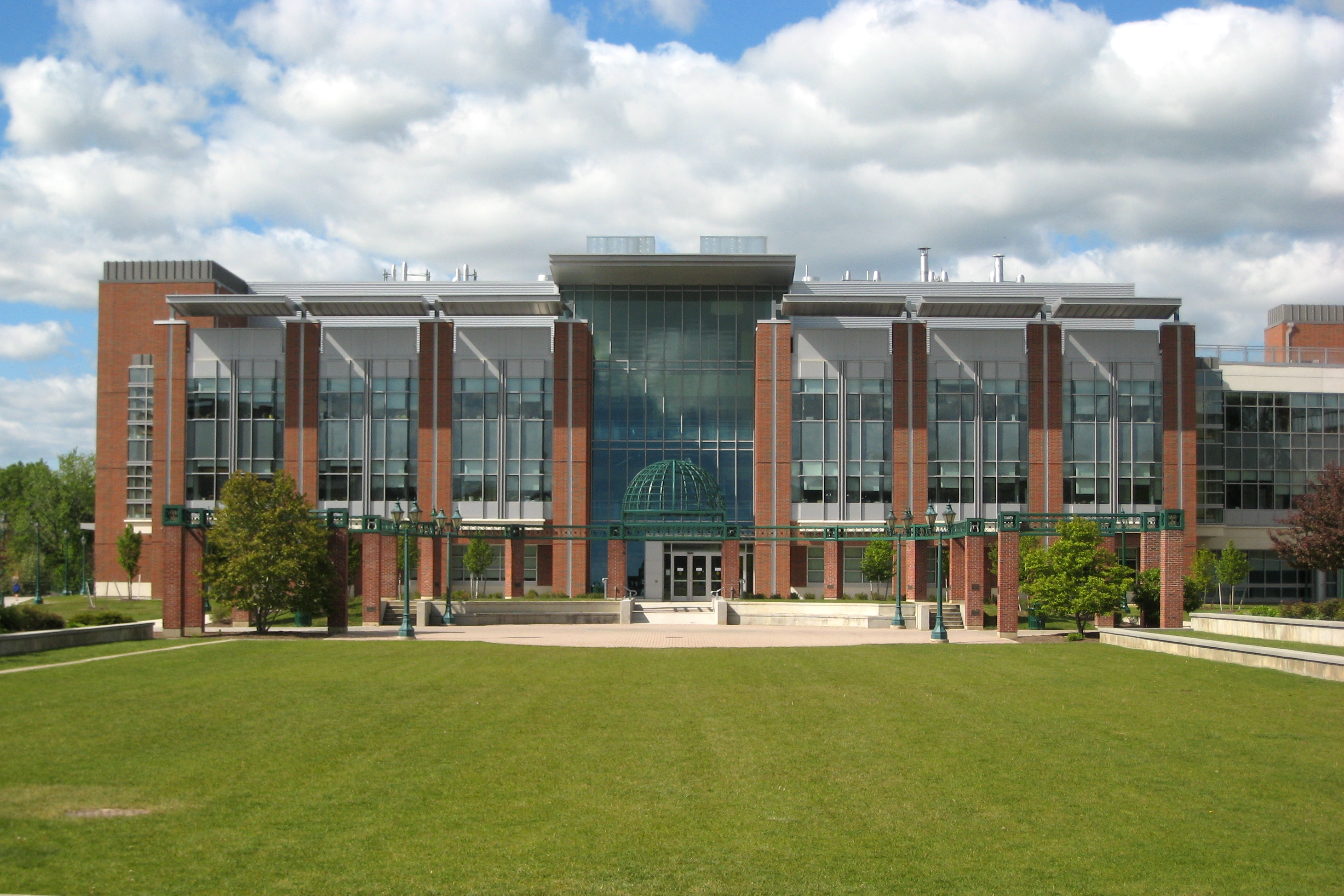
Integrated Science Center at SUNY Geneseo

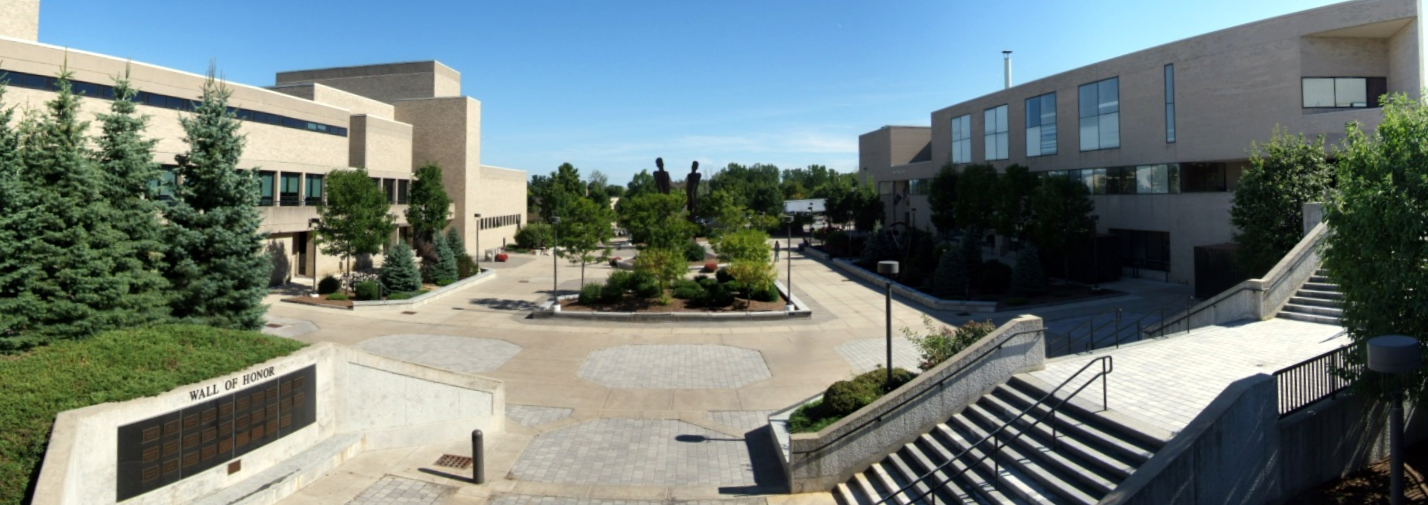
Amitié Plaza at SUNY Plattsburgh

Name	Location	County	Founded (Note: Each college's founding year is linked to the category of all schools founded in that year.)	Enrollment (Note: As of Fall 2025) undergraduate / graduate	Athletics	References
Buffalo State University	Buffalo	Erie	1871	5,196 / 899	NCAA Division III	
Empire State University	Saratoga Springs	Saratoga	1971	9,039 / 2,365	N/A	(Note: Has 35 branch campuses)
Purchase College	Purchase	Westchester	1967	3,314 / 96	NCAA Division III	
State University of New York at Cortland	Cortland	Cortland	1868	5,891 / 1,090	NCAA Division III	(Note: The outdoor education center at Camp Pine Knot is a National Historic Landmark.)
State University of New York at Fredonia	Fredonia	Chautauqua	1826	2,691 / 483	NCAA Division III	
State University of New York at Geneseo	Geneseo	Livingston	1871	3,917 / 75	NCAA Division III	
State University of New York at Oneonta	Oneonta	Otsego	1889	4,815 / 718	NCAA Division III	
State University of New York at Oswego	Oswego	Oswego	1861	5,293 / 1,190	NCAA Division III	
State University of New York at New Paltz	New Paltz	Ulster	1828	6,113 / 1,034	NCAA Division III	
State University of New York at Plattsburgh	Plattsburgh	Clinton	1889	3,831 / 730	NCAA Division III	
State University of New York at Potsdam	Potsdam	St. Lawrence	1816	1,750 / 769	NCAA Division III	(Note: One of the 100 oldest colleges in the United States.)
State University of New York at Old Westbury	Old Westbury	Nassau	1965	4,478 / 470	NCAA Division III	
SUNY Brockport	Brockport	Monroe	1867	6,152 / 1,776	NCAA Division III	

== Technology colleges ==
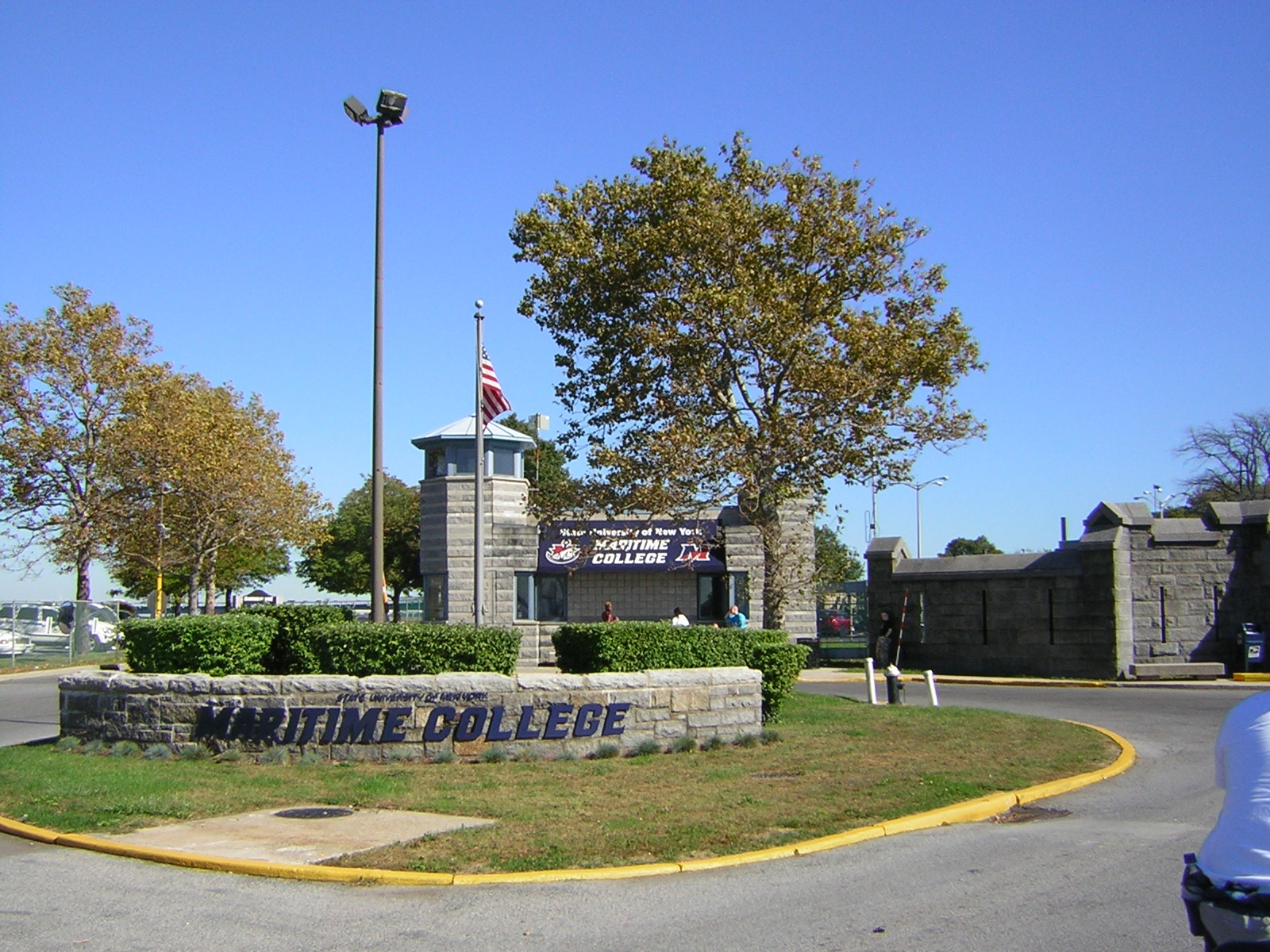
Main entrance of SUNY Maritime

Name	Location	County	Founded (Note: Each college's founding year is linked to the category of all schools founded in that year.)	Enrollment (Note: As of Fall 2025) undergraduate / graduate	Athletics	References
Alfred State College	Alfred	Allegany	1908	3,765 / 0	NCAA Division III	
Farmingdale State College	East Farmingdale	Suffolk	1912	10,062 / 44	NCAA Division III	
State University of New York at Canton	Canton	St. Lawrence	1906	2,845 / 0	NCAA Division III	
State University of New York at Cobleskill	Cobleskill	Schoharie	1916	1,824 / 0	NCAA Division III	
State University of New York at Delhi	Delhi	Delaware	1913	2,882 / 179	NCAA Division III	
State University of New York at Morrisville	Morrisville	Madison	1908	2,042 / 18	NCAA Division III	
State University of New York Maritime College	New York City	Bronx	1874	1,401 / 151	NCAA Division III	(Note: First and largest commercial maritime institution in the United States.)

== Community colleges ==
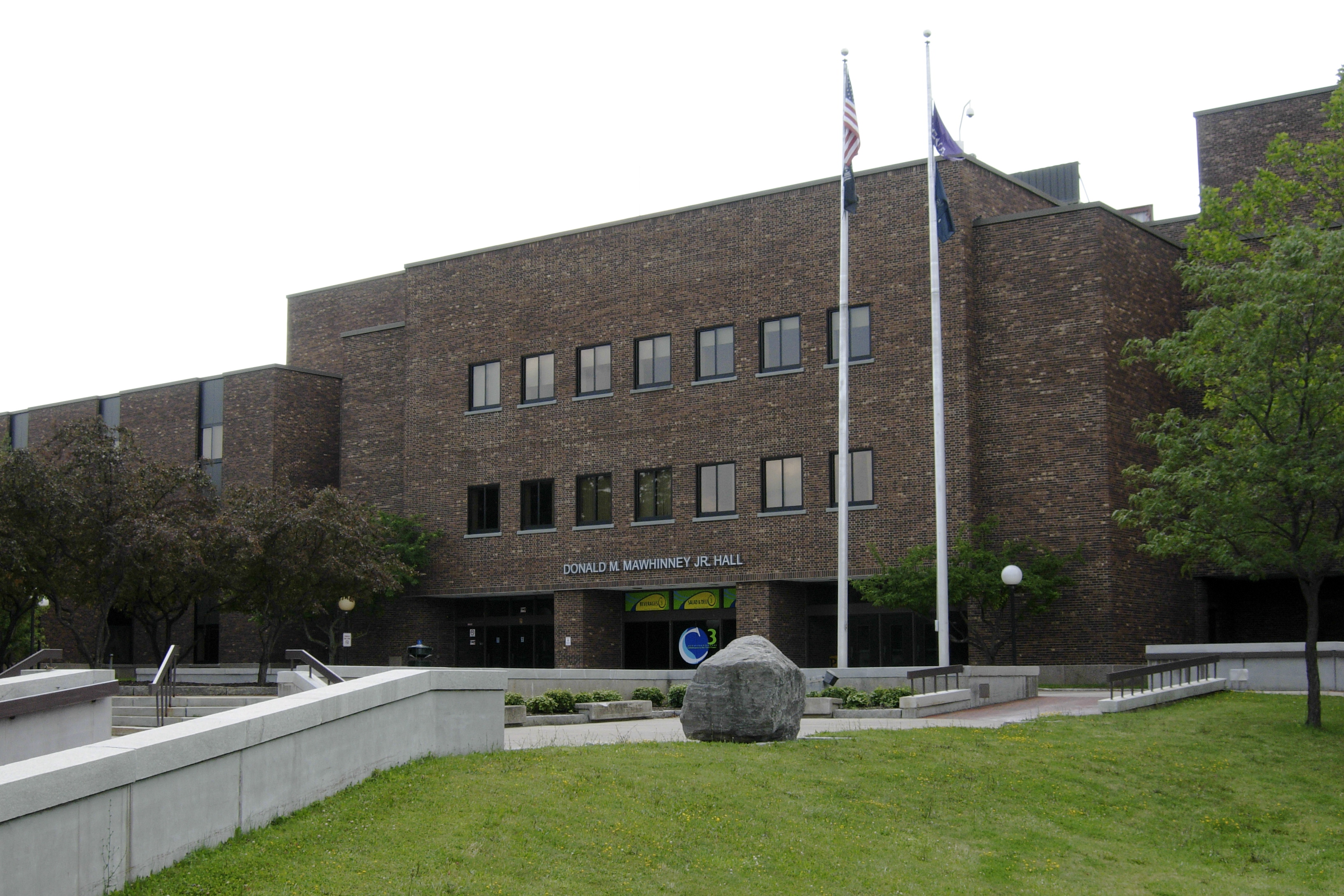
Mawhinney Hall at Onondaga Community College

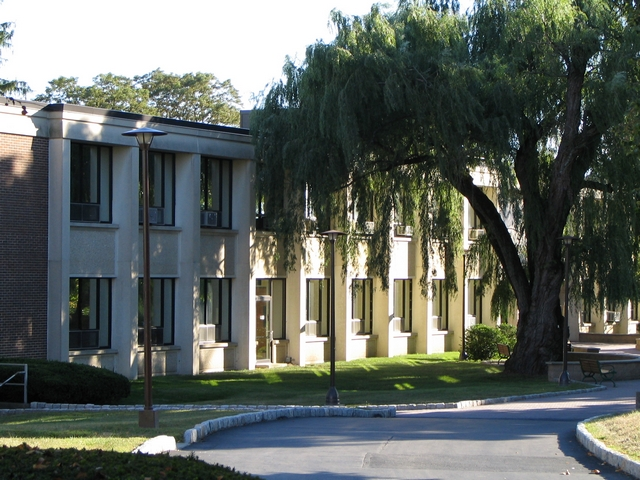
Taconic Hall at Dutchess Community College

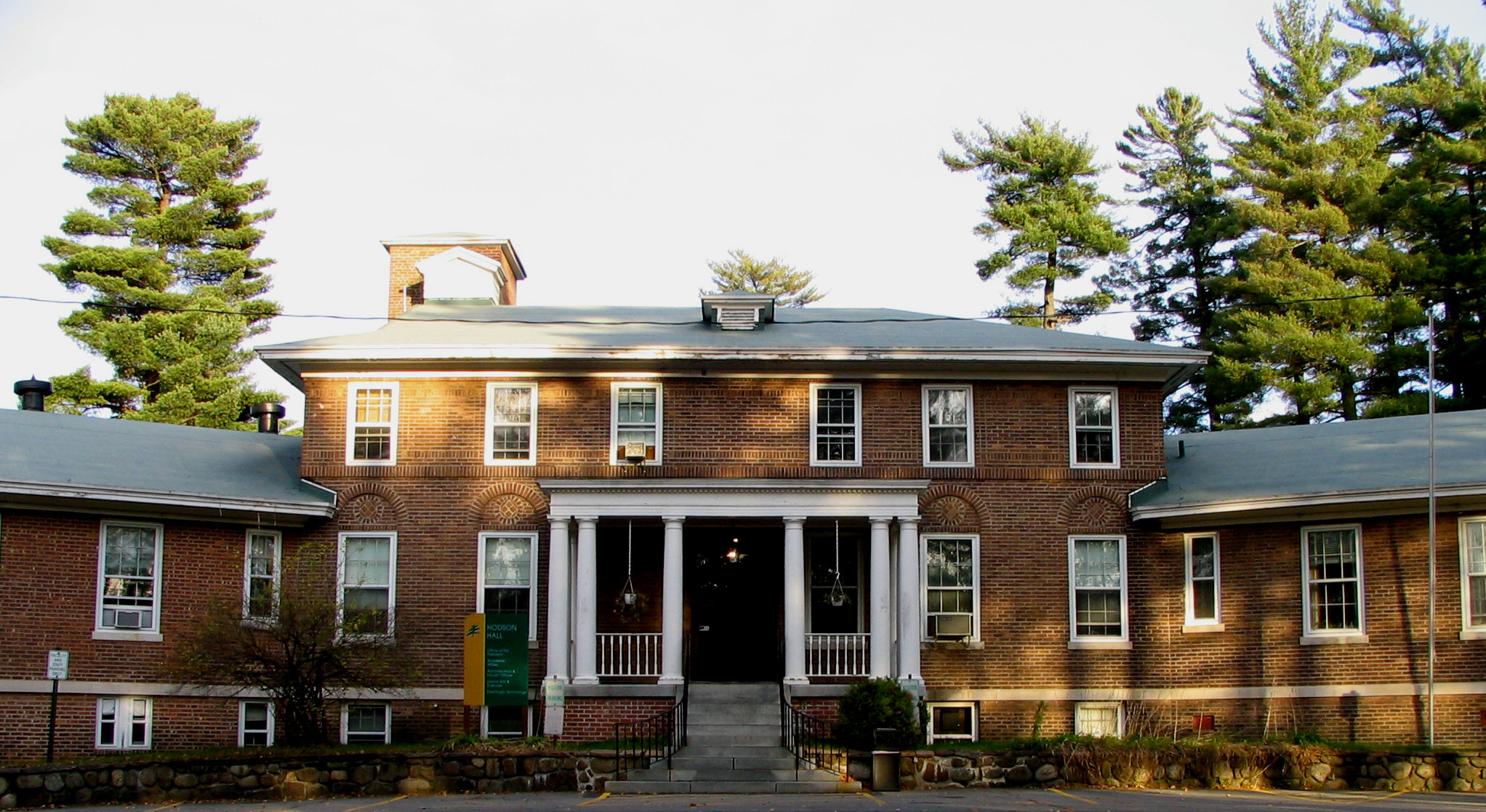
Hodson Hall at North Country Community College

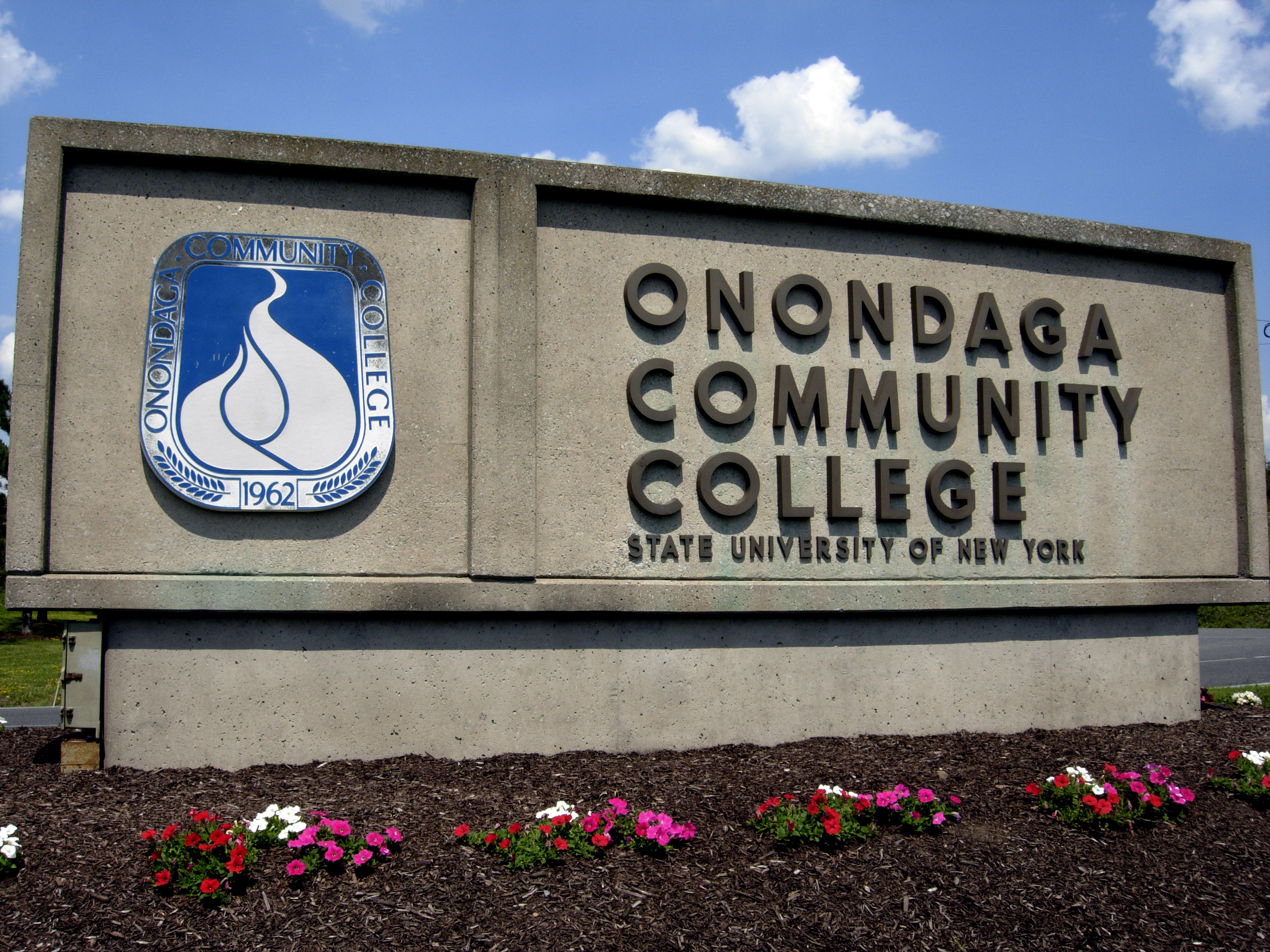
Onondaga Community College entrance sign

Name	Location	County	Founded (Note: Each college's founding year is linked to the category of all schools founded in that year)	Enrollment (Note: As of Fall 2025) full time /part time	References
Cayuga Community College	Auburn	Cayuga	1953	747 / 2,964	(Note: Originally named Auburn Community College.)
Clinton Community College	Plattsburgh (Note: Campus located on the site of the defunct Bellarmine College.)	Clinton	1967	353 / 818	
Columbia–Greene Community College	Hudson	Columbia	1966	422 / 1,159	
Corning Community College	Corning	Steuben	1958	1,305 / 2,417	
Dutchess Community College	Poughkeepsie	Dutchess	1957	2,708 / 4,286	
Fashion Institute of Technology	New York City	New York	1944	7,058 / 1,100	
Finger Lakes Community College	Canandaigua	Ontario	1967	2,310 / 4,084	
Fulton–Montgomery Community College	Johnstown	Fulton	1963	704 / 1,297	
Genesee Community College	Batavia	Genesee	1965	1,573 / 2,842	
Herkimer County Community College	Herkimer	Herkimer	1967	894 / 1,101	
Hudson Valley Community College	Troy	Rensselaer	1953	4,895 / 4,914	(Note: Originally named Troy Technical Institute)
Jamestown Community College	Jamestown (Note: Has campuses in New York and Pennsylvania.)	Chautauqua	1950	1,450 / 2,502	
Jefferson Community College	Watertown	Jefferson	1962	1,138 / 1,206	
Mohawk Valley Community College	Utica	Oneida	1946	2,424 / 3,671	
Monroe Community College	Brighton	Monroe	1961	4,652 / 4,491	
Nassau Community College	East Garden City	Nassau	1960	7,231 / 6,591	
North Country Community College	Saranac Lake	Essex	1967	814 / 1,000	(Note: Official College of the 1980 Winter Olympic Games.)
Onondaga Community College	Syracuse	Onondaga	1962	3,464 / 5,601	
Rockland Community College	Suffern	Rockland	1959	2,355 / 3,030	
Schenectady County Community College	Schenectady	Schenectady	1969	1,085 / 2,815	
Suffolk County Community College	Selden	Suffolk	1959	10,007 / 11,370	
SUNY Adirondack	Queensbury	Warren	1960	1,223 / 1,460	
SUNY Broome Community College	Binghamton	Broome	1946	2,597 / 3,332	
SUNY Erie	Buffalo	Erie	1946	4,782 / 3,747	
SUNY Niagara	Sanborn	Niagara	1962	2,348 / 2,437	
SUNY Orange	Middletown	Orange	1950	2,368 / 3,572	
SUNY Sullivan	Loch Sheldrake	Sullivan	1963	572 / 955	
SUNY Ulster	Stone Ridge	Ulster	1961	1,099 / 2,051	
Tompkins Cortland Community College	Dryden	Tompkins	1966	1,208 / 3,690	
Westchester Community College	Valhalla	Westchester	1946	4,675 / 5,034	

== Map ==
Location of SUNY campuses within New York state.
Red: University centers; Black: Other doctoral-granting institutions; Yellow: Comprehensive colleges; Green: Technology colleges; Blue: Community colleges.

== See also ==
- State University of New York
- SUNY Press
