= Ducky Pond =

American football player and coach (1902–1982)

Biographical details
- Born: February 17, 1902; Torrington, Connecticut, U.S.
- Died: August 23, 1982 (aged 80); Torrington, Connecticut, U.S.

Playing career

Football
- 1922–1924: Yale

Baseball
- 1923–1925: Yale
- Positions: Halfback (football); Pitcher (baseball)

Coaching career (HC unless noted)

Football
- 1934–1940: Yale
- 1941: Bates
- 1943: Willow Grove NAS
- 1944: Georgia Pre-Flight
- 1946–1951: Bates

Head coaching record
- Overall: 57–60–3
- Bowls: 0–1

Accomplishments and honors

Awards
- First-team All-American (1924)

Raymond W. "Ducky" Pond (February 17, 1902 – August 23, 1982) was an American college football player and coach. He was the head football coach at Yale University from 1934 to 1940, and at Bates College in 1941 and from 1946 to 1951. Pond's record at Yale was 30–25–2 record, including a 4–3 mark in Harvard–Yale football rivalry. He mentored two of the first three winners of the Heisman Trophy, Larry Kelley and Clint Frank. At Bates, Pond led the undefeated and untied 1946 Bobcats squad to the inaugural Glass Bowl.

Pond was a public relations executive after his career in athletics.

== Early life and playing career ==
Pond, after attending high school in Torrington, Connecticut, his birthplace, and the Hotchkiss School, was a member of the Yale Class of 1925, and a 1924 first-team All-American at halfback. Pond starred in the 1923 edition of The Game. He was nicknamed "Ducky" by Grantland Rice for returning a fumble 63 yards that afternoon against Harvard on a field that resembled "seventeen lakes, five quagmires and a water hazard". Yale had not scored a touchdown versus Harvard since the end of World War I.

== Coaching career ==
An uproar engulfed Pond's hiring as head football coach at Yale in 1934. Though he had been head scout and an assistant for his predecessor, Mal Stevens, who coached from 1928 to 1932, and an alumnus like every head coach before him, Time magazine reported that the "New York City alumni, who had waged a furious fight to end Yale's policy of graduate coaches and demanded a proven winner from outside" were enraged that Michigan's Harry Kipke had not been invited to coach the team. Kipke had coached Michigan to consecutive national championships in 1932 and 1933. The alumni probably desired a reversal of the program's decline versus Harvard. Yale led the Harvard–Yale football rivalry 22–6–5 from 1875 to 1912; however, from 1913 to 1933, Harvard led the series 11–7–1. Pond, whose head coaching experience had been two seasons at Hotchkiss, was the last alumnus head coach of football at Yale. Reginald D. Root, head coach for the 1933 season and an alumnus, had a .500 record and lost to Harvard.

Pond coached an historically significant game in 1934 versus Princeton. The 1934 contest was the last time a group of 11 starters played the entire 60 minutes of a game. At Palmer Stadium, Yale ended Princeton's 15-game winning streak with a 7–0 upset on November 17. The New York Times (November 17, 1934) reported that an expected capacity crowd of 52,000 would attend the contest, the 58th in the series. Princeton won another 12 consecutive games after the loss. The Yale starters, Larry Kelley among them, were nicknamed Iron Men by the press. Kelley scored the contest's sole touchdown. Fritz Crisler, considered the father of two-platoon football, was Pond's counterpart at Princeton. The contest has been subject of two books, Yale's Ironmen: A Story of Football & Lives in The Decade of the Depression & Beyond and Football's Last Iron Men: 1934, Yale vs. Princeton, And One Stunning Upset.

Pond coached two Heisman Trophy winners while at Yale. End Larry Kelley in 1936 and halfback Clint Frank in 1937 were the second and third winners of the most prestigious individual award in football. Among the total of 21 assistants employed by Pond at Yale, future President Gerald Ford served for four seasons, from 1937 to 1940, while attending Yale Law School, and Greasy Neale was hired as the backfield coach right after Pond's announced elevation on February 1, 1934. Neale had coached West Virginia to a 3–5–3 record in 1933, his third year there. Neale was clearly the chief strategist among the coaches.

== Honors ==
Yale's athletic department awards the annual Raymond W. Pond Pitching Award.

== Head coaching record ==
Year	Team	Overall	Conference	Standing	Bowl/playoffs	AP^{#}
Yale Bulldogs (Independent) (1934–1940)
1934	Yale	5–3				
1935	Yale	6–3				
1936	Yale	7–1				12
1937	Yale	6–1–1				12
1938	Yale	2–6				
1939	Yale	3–4–1				
1940	Yale	1–7				
Yale:		30–25–2				
Bates Bobcats () (1941)
1941	Bates	3–4				
Willow Grove Naval Air Station Hellcats (Independent) (1943)
1943	Willow Grove NAS	1–0 (Note: Pond began the 1943 season as head coach of the Willow Grove Naval Air Station team. In October, after the Hellcats' first game, the entire team, aside from Pond, was transferred from Willow Grove Naval Air Station to Atlantic City Naval Air Station. Lew Elverson was elevated to head coach after the transfer. The team finished the season with an overall record of 2–3.)				
Willow Grove NAS:		1–0				
Georgia Pre-Flight Skycrackers (Independent) (1944)
1944	Georgia Pre-Flight	4–5				
Georgia Pre-Flight:		4–5				
Bates Bobcats (Maine Intercollegiate Athletic Conference) (1946–1951)
1946	Bates	7–1	3–0	1st	L Glass	
1947	Bates	4–4				
1948	Bates	4–3				
1949	Bates	3–4				
1950	Bates	1–7				
1951	Bates	0–7–1				
Bates:		22–30–1				
Total:		57–60–3				
National championship Conference title Conference division title or championship game berth
^{#}Rankings from final AP Poll.
