= Raymond Wolf =

American baseball player (1904–1979)

- Wolf pictured in Yackety Yack 1938, North Carolina yearbook

Biographical details
- Born: July 15, 1904; Chicago, Illinois, U.S.
- Died: October 6, 1979 (aged 75); Fort Worth, Texas, U.S.

Playing career

Football
- 1924–1926: TCU

Baseball
- 1925–1927: TCU
- 1927: Columbus Senators
- 1927: Cincinnati Reds
- 1928: Columbus Senators
- Positions: Tackle (football); First baseman (baseball)

Coaching career (HC unless noted)

Football
- 1929–1935: TCU (line)
- 1936–1941: North Carolina
- 1942: Georgia Pre-Flight
- 1946–1949: Florida
- 1950–1951: Tulane (line)
- 1952–1953: Tulane

Baseball
- 1935–1936: TCU

Administrative career (AD unless noted)
- 1934–1936: TCU
- 1946–1949: Florida

Head coaching record
- Overall: 64–55–7 (football); 17–21–1 (baseball)

Raymond Bernard Wolf (July 15, 1904 – October 6, 1979), nicknamed "Bear" Wolf, was an American football and baseball player and coach. Wolf was a native of Illinois and an alumnus of Texas Christian University (TCU), where he played college football and college baseball. He played professional baseball for two seasons, and appeared in one Major League Baseball game for the Cincinnati Reds in 1927. Wolf served as the head football coach at the University of North Carolina (1936–1941), the University of Florida (1946–1949) and Tulane University (1952–1953). He was also the head baseball coach at his alma mater, TCU, from 1935 to 1936 and the athletic director at Florida from 1946 to 1949.

== Early years ==
Wolf was born in Chicago, in 1904. He attended Texas Christian University (TCU) in Fort Worth, Texas, where he played tackle for the Texas Christian Horned Frogs football team from 1924 to 1926. He played professional baseball for the Cincinnati Reds organization for a single season in 1927, but returned to TCU to graduate in 1928. Thereafter, Wolf got his start in coaching, working with the TCU linemen from 1929 to 1935.

== Coaching career ==
From 1936 to 1941, Wolf was employed by the University of North Carolina in Chapel Hill, North Carolina to coach the North Carolina Tar Heels football team, and compiled a 38–17–3 record in six seasons. The university board of trustees renewed his contract at an increased salary in 1941 for an additional five years, but his service in the navy prevented him from coaching during World War II.

Wolf became an officer in the U.S. Navy Reserve in 1942 during World War II. After initial training, he worked as a football coach at two of the service's naval aviation training stations, including the Navy's Pre-Flight School in Athens, Georgia and Flight Preparatory School in Austin, Texas. He led the 1942 Georgia Pre-Flight Skycrackers football team to a 7–1–1 record, including victories over Penn, Auburn, and Alabama. He was eventually promoted to lieutenant commander, and after the war ended in September 1945, the Navy released Wolf to inactive duty.

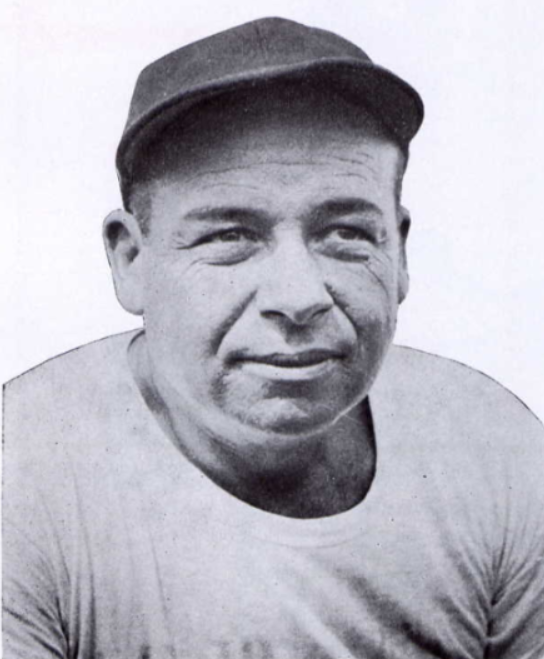
Wolf c. 1949

In 1946, Wolf was hired by the University of Florida in Gainesville, Florida to be the new head football coach of the Florida Gators football team, replacing coach Tom Lieb. Wolf coached the Gators for four seasons from 1946 to 1949 and posted a 13–24–2 record, but his Southeastern Conference (SEC) record was 2–17–2. The Florida Board of Control balked at renewing his contract when his initial three-year term expired after the 1948 season, but offered him a two-year contract extension in the aftermath of widespread public demonstrations of support by the football team and the Florida student body. Wolf was fired after the 1949 season, but nevertheless managed to leave Florida on a high note when his 1949 Gators upset the rival Georgia Bulldogs 28–7 for the first and only time during his tenure. In retrospect, Wolf's loyal Gators football players ironically dubbed his tenure as the "Golden Era," and many of his returning players formed the nucleus of Bob Woodruff's improving Gators football teams of the early 1950s.

In 1950, Wolf was hired by head coach Henry Frnka of Tulane University in New Orleans, Louisiana, to be a senior assistant coach for the Tulane Green Wave football team. When Frnka unexpectedly resigned in March 1952, Wolf became the head coach and led the Green Wave during the 1952 and 1953 seasons, finishing with a 6–13–1 overall record and 3–12 in the SEC.

== Later years ==
After retiring from coaching after the 1953 season, Wolf became an administrative officer at TCU, his alma mater. He was honored as a member of the TCU Lettermen's Association Hall of Fame. Wolf died of cancer in Fort Worth, Texas in 1979.

== Head coaching record ==
=== Football ===
Year	Team	Overall	Conference	Standing	Bowl/playoffs
North Carolina Tar Heels (Southern Conference) (1936–1941)
1936	North Carolina	8–2	5–1	2nd	
1937	North Carolina	7–1–1	4–0–1	2nd	
1938	North Carolina	6–2–1	4–1	4th	
1939	North Carolina	8–1–1	5–1	3rd	
1940	North Carolina	6–4	3–2	T–5th	
1941	North Carolina	3–7	2–4	11th	
North Carolina:		38–17–3	23–9–1		
Georgia Pre-Flight Skycrackers (Independent) (1942)
1942	Georgia Pre-Flight	7–1–1			
Georgia Pre-Flight:		7–1–1			
Florida Gators (Southeastern Conference) (1946–1949)
1946	Florida	0–9	0–5	12th	
1947	Florida	4–5–1	0–3–1	12th	
1948	Florida	5–5	1–5	T–10th	
1949	Florida	4–6–1	1–4–1	T–10th	
Florida:		13–24–2	2–17–2		
Tulane Green Wave (Southeastern Conference) (1952–1953)
1952	Tulane	5–5	3–5	8th	
1953	Tulane	1–8–1	0–7	12th	
Tulane:		6–13–1	3–12		
Total:		64–55–7			
