= Ralph Ricker =

American football coach

Biographical details
- Born: January 31, 1908; Carlisle, Pennsylvania, U.S.
- Died: February 7, 1987 (aged 79); Centre County, Pennsylvania, U.S.

Playing career
- 1927–1929: Penn State

Coaching career (HC unless noted)
- 1930–1933: Lock Haven HS (PA)
- 1934–1935: Abington HS (PA) (assistant)
- 1936–1942: West Chester (assistant)
- 1946–1949: Dickinson
- 1950–1953: Lebanon Valley

Head coaching record
- Overall: 38–22–3 (college)
- Bowls: 0–1

Ralph Ross "Dutch" Ricker (January 31, 1908 – February 7, 1987) was an American football coach. He served as the head football coach at Dickinson College in Carlisle, Pennsylvania from 1946 to 1949 and Lebanon Valley College in Annville, Pennsylvania from 1950 to 1953.

A native of Carlisle, Pennsylvania, Ricker played college football at Pennsylvania State University before graduating with Bachelor of Arts and Master of Arts degrees in history. Ricker began his coaching career in 1930 at Lock Haven High in Lock Haven, Pennsylvania at head football coach. In 1934, he moved to Abington High School in Abington, Pennsylvania, where he was an assistant football coach.

== Head coaching record ==
=== College ===
Year	Team	Overall	Conference	Standing	Bowl/playoffs
Dickinson Red Devils (Independent) (1946–1949)
1946	Dickinson	6–1			
1947	Dickinson	4–3–1			
1948	Dickinson	3–4–1			
1949	Dickinson	5–2–1			
Dickinson:		18–10–3			
Lebanon Valley Flying Dutchmen (Independent) (1950–1953)
1950	Lebanon Valley	4–4			
1951	Lebanon Valley	7–3			L Burley
1952	Lebanon Valley	4–3			
1953	Lebanon Valley	5–2			
Lebanon Valley:		20–12			
Total:		38–22–3			
