= 1946 Massachusetts State Aggies football team =

American college football season

1946 Massachusetts State Aggies football
- Conference: Independent
- Record: 6–2
- Head coach: Walter Hargesheimer (3rd season)
- Home stadium: Alumni Field

The 1946 Massachusetts State Aggies football team was an American football team that represented Massachusetts State College during the 1946 college football season. In their third season under head coach Walter Hargesheimer, the Aggies compiled a 6–2 record (1–1 against conference opponents) and outscored opponents by a total of 184 to 48. The 1946 season was the team's last as the Massachusetts State Aggies, as they would begin play in 1947 as the University of Massachusetts Redmen.

The team played its home games at Alumni Field in Amherst, Massachusetts.

== Schedule ==
Date	Time	Opponent	Site	Result	Attendance	Source
September 28		at Bates	Garcelon Field; Lewiston, ME	L 0–6		
October 5		Bowdoin	Alumni Field; Amherst, MA	W 11–8		
October 12		at Worcester Tech	Alumni Field; Worcester, MA	W 39–0		
October 19		Rhode Island State	Alumni Field; Amherst, MA	L 6–14		
October 26		at Norwich	Sabine Field; Northfield, VT	W 14–0		
November 2		Vermont	Alumni Field; Amherst, MA	W 28–20	3,000	
November 9		CCNY	Alumni Field; Amherst, MA	W 59–0	1,500	
November 16	2:00 p.m.	at Tufts	Tufts Oval; Somerville, MA	W 27–0		
All times are in Eastern time
