= Farmingdale State College =

Public college in East Farmingdale, New York, U.S.

State University of New York Farmingdale
- Former name: List: New York State School of Agriculture on Long Island (1912–1920); New York State School of Applied Agriculture on Long Island (1920–1924); State Institute of Applied Agriculture (1924–1939); State Institute of Agriculture (1939–1946); Long Island Agricultural and Technical Institute (1946–1953); SUNY Long Island Agricultural and Technical Institute at Farmingdale (1953–1966); Agricultural and Technical College at Farmingdale (1966–1987); SUNY College of Technology at Farmingdale (1987–1993)
- Motto: Let Each Become All One Is Capable of Being
- Type: Public college
- Established: 1912; 114 years ago
- Parent institution: State University of New York
- Endowment: 6.7 million (2019)
- President: Robert Prezant
- Provost: Sean Lane
- Students: 10,106 (fall 2025)
- Undergraduates: 10,062 (fall 2025)
- Postgraduates: 44 (fall 2025)
- Location: East Farmingdale, New York, U.S. 40.7529°N 73.4266°W
- Campus: Suburban, 380 acres (1.5 km^{2})
- Colors: Green & white
- Nickname: Rams
- Sporting affiliations: NCAA Division III; Skyline, ECAC
- Mascot: Ram-bo
- Website: farmingdale.edu

The State University of New York at Farmingdale (Farmingdale State College or SUNY Farmingdale) is a public college in East Farmingdale, New York, United States. It is part of the State University of New York. The college was chartered in 1912 as a school of applied agriculture under the name of "New York State School Of Agriculture on Long Island".

== History ==
The State University of New York at Farmingdale, established in 1912, originally began as the "New York State School of Agriculture on Long Island". The proposal for the college's founding was put forth by State Assemblyman John Lupton in 1909. Lupton Hall, which accommodates the departments of Chemistry and Physics, as well as the School of Engineering Technology, is named in his honor.

Two of the oldest buildings on campus are Hicks Hall and Cutler Hall, which were constructed in 1914 and were originally called the Horticulture and Agronomy Buildings, respectively. The buildings house four oil on canvas murals, painted in 1936 by local artists Frederick Marshall and C. E. Lessing as a part of the Works Progress Administration. The murals depict agricultural scenes, including wheat threshing, rice harvesting, and cotton picking.

Ward Hall, also constructed in 1914, was the original dormitory and now houses offices including Alumni Relations and Business Outreach. When the college first admitted students in March 1916, Ward Hall was not yet completed. Students slept instead in temporary quarters on the upper level of Conklin Hall, which was then the physical plant.

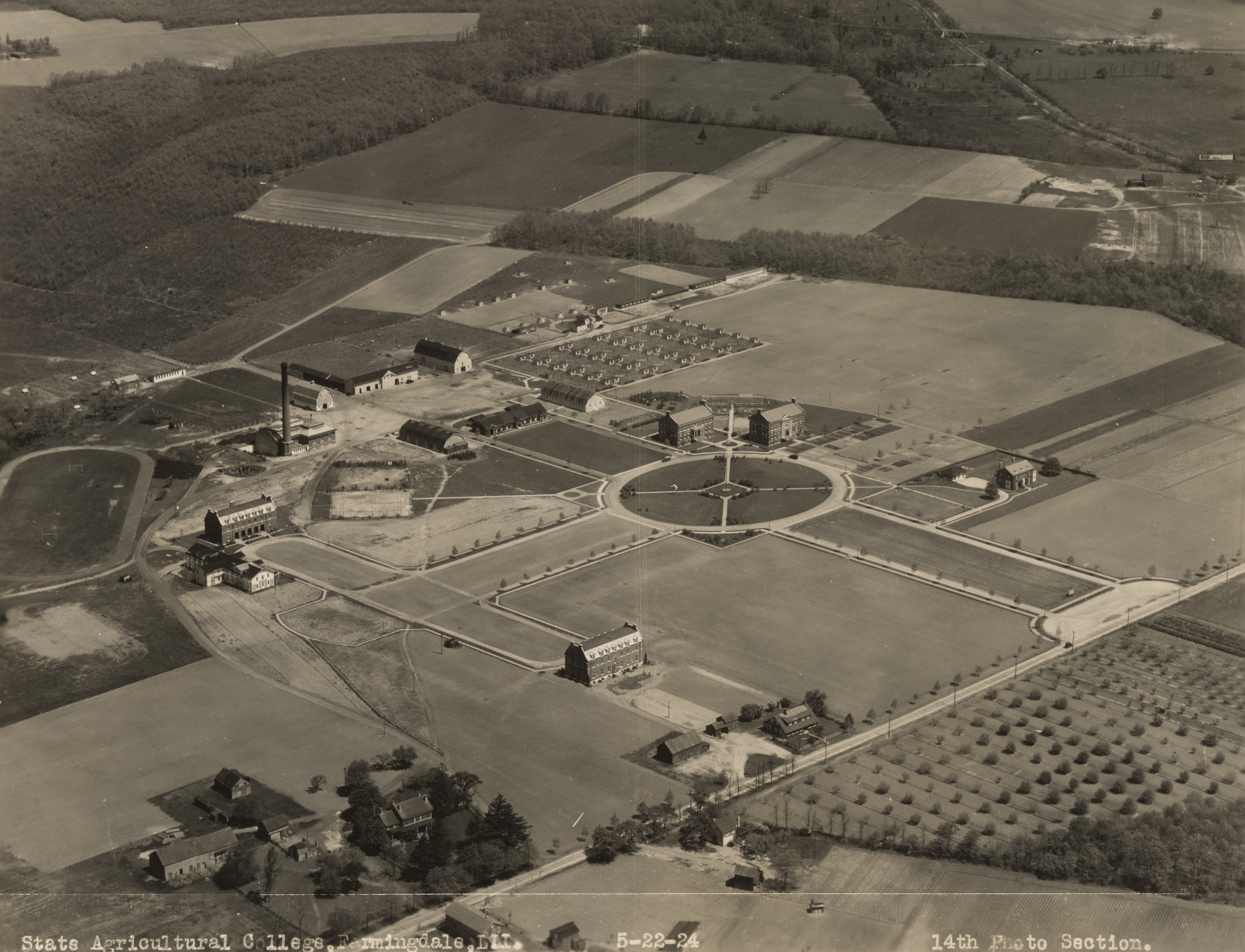
Farmingdale State College in 1924

Theodore Roosevelt Jr. delivered the address at the college's second commencement exercises on May 26, 1920. That same year, the school changed its name for the first time, becoming the "New York State School Of Applied Agriculture on Long Island".

Later historical buildings include Knapp Hall, completed in 1937, and Thompson Hall, completed in 1938, which were each built in the Georgian Colonial style.

A Memorial Oak was planted on June 4, 1921, to honor American soldiers killed in World War I. The Oak was planted in soil collected from all 48 states as well as from the allied nations from the war. A plaque gifted by the Class of 1927 reads:

This Oak, Planted June 4, 1921, Commemorates The Efforts, Sacrifices And Achievements Of All Americans Who Gave Their Lives In The World War. Its Roots Rest in Soil From All The Allied Nations, From Every State And Dependency Of Our Country, From The Bloody Angle Of Gettysburg And From The Arc De Triomphe Of France. On Fames Eternal Camping-Ground Their Silent Tents Are Spread, And Glory Guards With Solemn Round The Bivouac Of The Dead.

The school's name would change seven more times before its current name was adopted in 1993; these changes included the "State Institute Of Applied Agriculture" (1924), "State Institute Of Agriculture" (1939), "Long Island Agricultural and Technical Institute" (1946), "SUNY Long Island Agricultural and Technical Institute at Farmingdale" (1953), "Agricultural and Technical College at Farmingdale" (1966), and "SUNY College of Technology at Farmingdale" (1987).

== Academics ==
Farmingdale offers more than 47 academic programs under the authority of one of four schools:

- Pasternack School of Engineering Technology
- School of Business
- Santmann School of Health Sciences
- School of Arts & Sciences

The awards bachelor's and master's degrees.

== Research centers ==
- Renewable Energy and Sustainability Center
- Solar Energy Center
- Applied Mathematics Center
- Social Science Research Institute
- Protect New York
- Infrastructure, Transportation and Security Center

== Student demographics ==
Undergraduate demographics as of Fall 2023
Race and ethnicity	Total
White	41%
Hispanic	29%
Asian	13%
Black	11%
Two or more races	4%
International student	2%
Economic diversity
Low-income (Note: The percentage of students who received an income-based federal Pell grant intended for low-income students.)	37%
Affluent (Note: The percentage of students who are a part of the American middle class at the bare minimum.)	63%

== Campus ==
The campus spans over 380 acres and more than 30 buildings. Farmingdale State College is primarily a commuter school but does offer residence halls.

Its Solar Energy Center is the first center to be accredited in the Northeast and the fourth in the nation, and Farmingdale has a federally funded Green Building Institute, an electric-fuel-powered campus fleet, a charging station, and a Smart Energy House. The Campus Center also has an energy-efficient roofing structure.

== Athletics ==
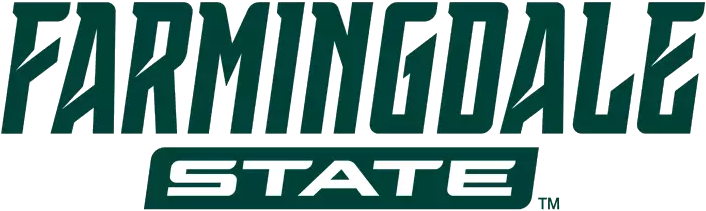
Farmingdale athletics wordmark

Farmingdale State College teams participate as a member of the National Collegiate Athletic Association's Division III and is a member of the Skyline Conference. The Intercollegiate Athletic Program supports and expands the total educational experience offered by the college. The program serves as a laboratory for the education of the student-athlete and is conducted in keeping with the general educational mission of the college.

Men's sports include baseball, basketball, cross country, golf, lacrosse, soccer, tennis, and track & field; while women's sports include basketball, cross country, lacrosse, soccer, softball, tennis, track & field, and volleyball.

== Notable alumni ==
- John Brooks – politician
- Fernando Caldeiro – NASA astronaut
- Richard Conrad – opera singer
- Michael DenDekker – politician
- Sal DeVito – advertising executive
- DJ Richie Rich – musician
- William Fichtner – actor
- Roy Gussow – sculptor
- Fred Hembeck – cartoonist
- Les Howe – professional baseball player
- Rushi Kota – actor
- Ryan LaFlare – professional mixed martial arts fighter
- John Romita Jr. – artist
- Matt Seelinger – professional baseball player
- Daniel Simone – author
- William N. Valavanis – Bonsai master
- Clyde Vanel – politician
- Len Wein – writer and editor

== See also ==
- List of colleges and universities in New York
- List of State University of New York units
