= American International Yellow Jackets =

Intercollegiate sports teams of American International College

- University: American International College
- Nickname: Yellow Jackets
- Association: Division II
- Conference: NE-10 (primary); ECC (men's volleyball)
- Athletic director: Rob Kearney
- Location: Springfield, Massachusetts
- Varsity teams: 25 (12 men's, 13 women's)
- Football stadium: Ronald J. Abdow Field
- Basketball arena: Henry A. Butova Gymnasium
- Baseball stadium: Richard F. Bedard Field
- Softball stadium: Judy Groff Field
- Other venues: MassMutual Center
- Colors: Black, white, and gold
- Mascot: Rex
- Website: www.aicyellowjackets.com
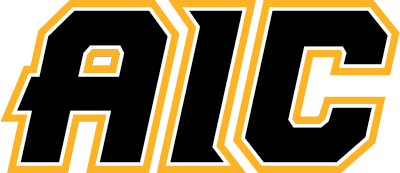

The American International Yellow Jackets is composed of 22 teams representing American International College in intercollegiate athletics, including men's and women's basketball, cross country, golf, lacrosse, soccer, track and field, and volleyball. Men's sports include baseball, football, ice hockey, and wrestling. Women's sports include field hockey, rugby, softball, and tennis. The Yellow Jackets compete in NCAA Division II and are members of the Northeast-10 Conference for all sports except men's volleyball, which competes as a de facto Division I member in the East Coast Conference, and women's triathlon, which competes as a de facto Division I independent.

== History ==
Intercollegiate athletics at AIC, then known as the French-American College, date back at least to 1895, when a French-American team defeated Highland of Holyoke, 18–0.

The Yellow Jackets started competing in the 1933–1934 academic season in football, men's basketball and baseball. Men's soccer was added just one year later. The athletic department grew to five teams in the winter of 1948 when the Yellow Jackets started their ice hockey team.

Twenty years later, AIC introduced its first women's sport, softball. Judy Groff was introduced as the first softball coach, a position she held for 42 seasons. Volleyball, which was invented down the road in Holyoke, Massachusetts, started in the fall of 1974 with Groff also taking the reins.

In the 1977–1978 school year, AIC began competing in women's basketball and men's golf. It would be seven years before the athletic department grew again when they added women's soccer for the 1985 school year.

With the emergence of lacrosse in the Northeast, the Yellow Jackets added men's lacrosse in the spring of 1992. In 1996-97, field hockey and women's lacrosse were added to the department to bring the women's teams total to six.

Ten years later, the Yellow Jackets added six teams to their already extensive department in men's and women's cross country, men's and women's indoor track, and men's and women's outdoor track.

In 2018, the department added women's golf.

With the backing of USA Triathlon, AIC became the 24th team in the nation to introduce a women's varsity triathlon program to its athletic department, Director of Athletics Matthew Johnson announced on Tuesday, May 29 AIC expected competition to begin in the fall of 2019.

During the fall of 2020, the department announced the addition of men's volleyball as the 26th sport sponsored by the department. The team started play in January 2022.

== Varsity sports ==
Men's sports	Women's sports
Baseball	Basketball
Basketball	Cross Country
Cross Country	Field Hockey
Football	Golf
Golf	Lacrosse
Ice Hockey	Rugby (Note: Part of the NCAA Emerging Sports for Women program. National championships are organized independently of the NCAA.)
Lacrosse	Soccer
Soccer	Softball
Track and Field	Tennis
Wrestling	Track and Field
Volleyball (Note: De facto NCAA Division I sport. The NCAA organizes a "National Collegiate" championship open to members of Divisions I and II. Scholarship limits are the same for members of both divisions.)	Triathlon
	Volleyball
† – Track and field includes both indoor and outdoor

== NCAA appearances ==
=== Division 1 ===
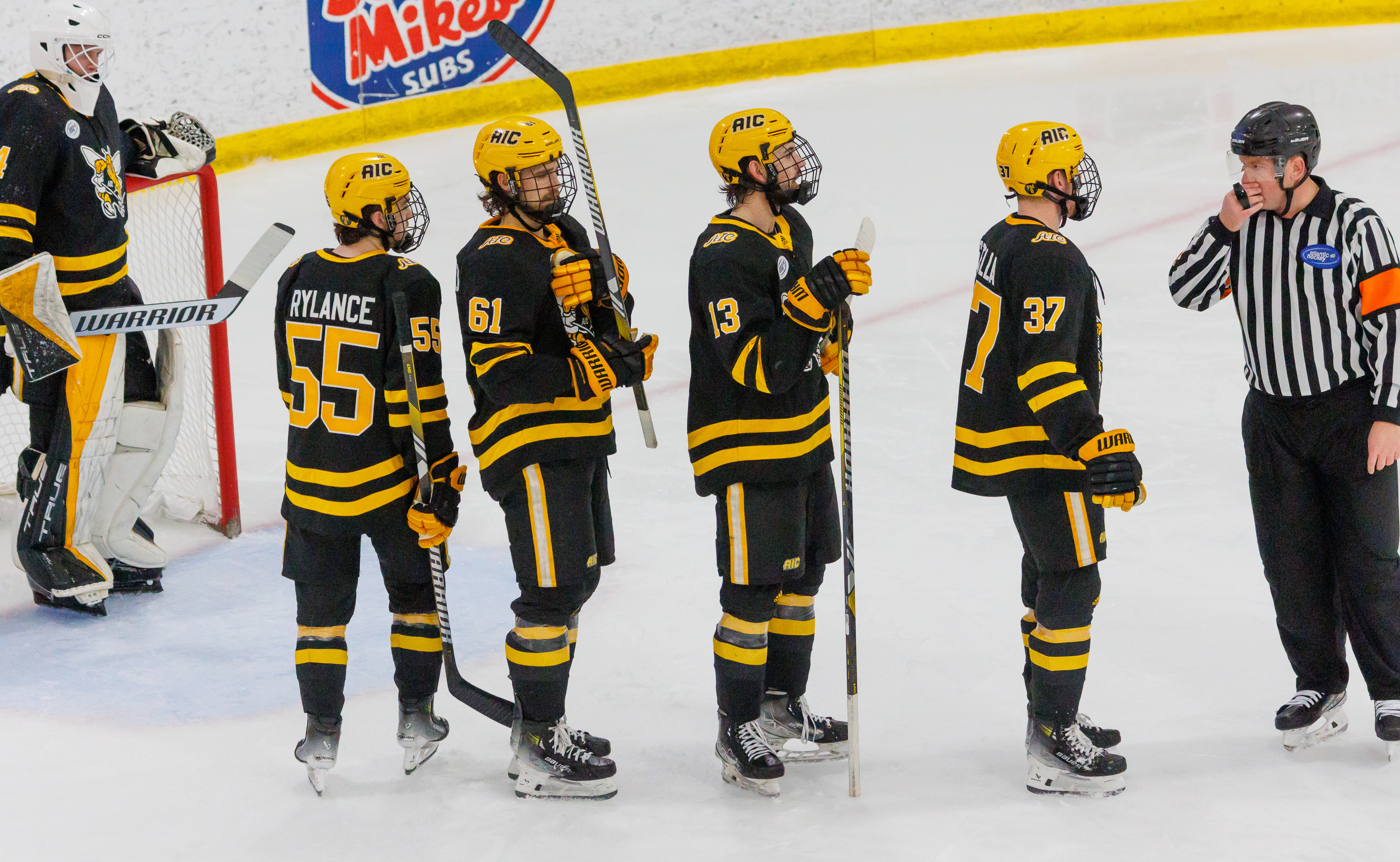
Yellow Jackets ice hockey competed in NCAA Division I from 1999 to the 2024-25 season. Self-relegated themselves to D3.

- Ice Hockey: 2019, 2021, 2022

=== Division 2 ===
- Baseball: 1991
- Men's Basketball: 1966, 1967, 1968, 1969, 1970, 1983, 1984, 1985, 1994, 2000, 2010, 2015
  - Elite Eight: 1968, 1969, 1970, 1985
- Men's Cross Country: 2012, 2014, 2016, 2017
- Football: 2008, 2013
- Men's Golf: 2008, 2009, 2010, 2011, 2012, 2014, 2015
- Women's Basketball: 1995, 1996, 2000, 2001, 2002, 2004, 2005, 2006, 2007, 2009, 2016
  - Elite Eight: 2002, 2006
  - National Finalist: 2006
- Field Hockey: 2010, 2011
- Women's Soccer: 1998, 2010, 2012, 2013, 2016
  - Final Four: 2013
- Softball: 1985, 1987, 1989, 1990, 1993, 1994, 1995, 1996, 1997, 1998, 1999, 2001, 2002, 2003
  - World Series: 1996, 1997
- Volleyball: 2010, 2016, 2017, 2018
  - Elite Eight: 2016, 2018

Wrestling 1995,1997,1998,1999,2000,2001

== Club sports ==
AIC also has a college rugby program that was founded in 2009 and began play in 2010. The rugby program is part of the school's athletic department, has varsity status, with rugby scholarships available for students. AIC plays in Division I in the D1A Conference.

== Notable alumni ==
- Romina Bell, Austrian football defender, playing for FC Neunkirch in the Swiss Nationalliga A.
- Jim Calhoun, Hall of Fame basketball coach
- Asnage Castelly, Olympic Games 1st Haitian wrestler in Summer Olympics in the 74 kg freestyle competition also the flag bearer of the Haitian delegation for the Olympics opening.
- Mario Elie, NBA guard
- Dave Forbes, NHL hockey player
- John Gibbons, First African American U.S. Marshall for the District
- Jānis Jaks, Professional Hockey player
- Brennan Kapcheck, Professional Hockey player
- Bruce Laird, NFL safety for the Baltimore Colts
- Tom Rychlec, NFL and AFL tight end for several teams
- Gashi, rapper

== Facilities ==
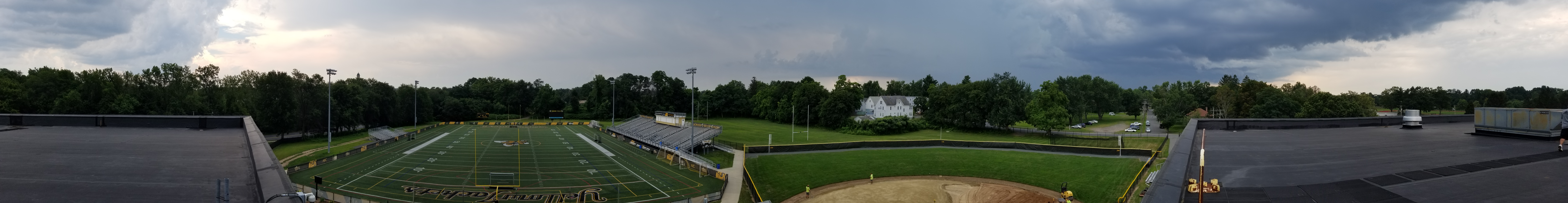
Facilities panorama
