= 1946 Central Michigan Chippewas football team =

American college football season

1946 Central Michigan Chippewas football
- Conference: Independent
- Record: 6–2
- Head coach: Ron Finch (10th season)
- Home stadium: Alumni Field

1946 Midwestern non-major college football independents records
	Conf.			Overall
Team	W	L	T	W		L		T
St. Norbert		–		8	–	0	–	0
Youngstown		–		7	–	1	–	0
Bradley		–		7	–	2	–	0
Central Michigan		–		6	–	2	–	0
Defiance		–		6	–	2	–	0
Western Michigan		–		5	–	2	–	1
Miami (OH)		–		7	–	3	–	0
Dayton		–		6	–	3	–	0
Carroll (WI)		–		4	–	2	–	1
Bowling Green		–		5	–	3	–	0
Ohio Wesleyan		–		5	–	4	–	1
Michigan Tech		–		3	–	2	–	0
Northern Michigan		–		3	–	2	–	1
Michigan State Normal		–		3	–	4	–	1
Xavier		–		3	–	7	–	0
Detroit Tech		–		1	–	6	–	1
Valparaiso		–		1	–	7	–	0
Sterling		–		1	–	8	–	0
Haskell		–		0	–	7	–	0

The 1946 Central Michigan Chippewas football team represented Central Michigan College of Education, later renamed Central Michigan University, as an independent during the 1946 college football season. In their 10th and final season under head coach Ron Finch, the Chippewas compiled a 6–2 record, shut out three opponents (Bowling Green, Northern Michigan, and Great Lakes NTS), and outscored all opponents by a combined total of 240 to 67. The team played its home games at Alumni Field in Mount Pleasant, Michigan.

Ron Finch was the team's head coach. Lawrence "Doc" Sweeney was the line coach, and Lyle Bennett was the assistant coach in charge of the ends, kickers, and the "B" team.

Central Michigan was ranked at No. 90 in the final Litkenhous Difference by Score System rankings for 1946.

Coach Finch retired as the school's head football coach in January 1947 to devote his efforts to his position as the head of the college's physical education department. In 10 years as the school's head football coach, Finch compiled a 54–18–1 record.

== Schedule ==
Date	Opponent	Site	Result	Attendance	Source
September 20	Ohio Wesleyan	Alumni Field; Mount Pleasant, MI	L 0–13		
September 27	Bowling Green	Alumni Field; Mount Pleasant, MI	W 7–0		
October 5	at Eastern Kentucky	Richmond, KY	W 20–7		
October 12	at Northern Michigan	Marquette, MI	W 60–0		
October 18	at Michigan State Normal	Walter O. Briggs Field; Ypsilanti, MI (rivalry)	W 26–13		
October 26	Northern Illinois^{†}	Alumni Field; Mount Pleasant, MI	W 58–7		
November 2	at Western Michigan	Waldo Stadium; Kalamazoo, MI (rivalry)	L 21–27	12,500	
November 9	Great Lakes Navy	Alumni Field; Mount Pleasant, MI (Oil Bowl)	W 41–0		
^{†}Homecoming
