= 1946 Xavier Musketeers football team =

American college football season

1946 Xavier Musketeers football
- Conference: Independent
- Record: 3–7
- Head coach: Phil H. Bucklew (1st season)
- Home stadium: Xavier Stadium

1946 Midwestern non-major college football independents records
| | Conf. | | | Overall |
| Team | W | L | T | W | | L | | T |
|---|---|---|---|---|---|---|---|---|
| St. Norbert | | – | | 8 | – | 0 | – | 0 |
| Youngstown | | – | | 7 | – | 1 | – | 0 |
| Bradley | | – | | 7 | – | 2 | – | 0 |
| Central Michigan | | – | | 6 | – | 2 | – | 0 |
| Defiance | | – | | 6 | – | 2 | – | 0 |
| Western Michigan | | – | | 5 | – | 2 | – | 1 |
| Miami (OH) | | – | | 7 | – | 3 | – | 0 |
| Dayton | | – | | 6 | – | 3 | – | 0 |
| Carroll (WI) | | – | | 4 | – | 2 | – | 1 |
| Bowling Green | | – | | 5 | – | 3 | – | 0 |
| Ohio Wesleyan | | – | | 5 | – | 4 | – | 1 |
| Michigan Tech | | – | | 3 | – | 2 | – | 0 |
| Northern Michigan | | – | | 3 | – | 2 | – | 1 |
| Michigan State Normal | | – | | 3 | – | 4 | – | 1 |
| Xavier | | – | | 3 | – | 7 | – | 0 |
| Detroit Tech | | – | | 1 | – | 6 | – | 1 |
| Valparaiso | | – | | 1 | – | 7 | – | 0 |
| Sterling | | – | | 1 | – | 8 | – | 0 |
| Haskell | | – | | 0 | – | 7 | – | 0 |

The 1946 Xavier Musketeers football team was an American football team that represented Xavier University as an independent during the 1946 college football season. In their first year under head coach Phil H. Bucklew, the Musketeers compiled a 3–7 record.

== Schedule ==
| Date | Opponent | Site | Result | Attendance | Source |
|---|---|---|---|---|---|
| September 29 | St. Ambrose | Xavier Stadium; Cincinnati, OH | L 0–3 | 10,000 | |
| October 5 | at Kentucky | McLean Stadium; Lexington, KY | L 0–70 | 20,200 | |
| October 11 | John Carroll | Xavier Stadium; Cincinnati, OH | W 7–6 | 4,000 | |
| October 19 | at Miami (OH) | Miami Field; Oxford, OH | L 6–28 | 12,000 | |
| October 26 | Arkansas State | Xavier Stadium; Cincinnati, OH | W 26–0 | 3,500 | |
| November 3 | Dayton | Xavier Stadium; Cincinnati, OH | L 6–33 | 10,000 | |
| November 9 | at Cincinnati | Nippert Stadium; Cincinnati, OH (rivalry) | L 0–39 | 17,000 | |
| November 16 | at Bowling Green | University Stadium; Bowling Green, OH | L 6–33 | 3,000 | |
| November 23 | Ohio^{†} | Xavier Stadium; Cincinnati, OH | L 6–25 | 3,000 | |
| November 28 | at Marshall | Fairfield Stadium; Huntington, WV | W 27–21 | 8,000 | |
^{†}Homecoming
