= 1946 Dayton Flyers football team =

American college football season

1946 Dayton Flyers football
- Conference: Independent
- Record: 6–3
- Head coach: Harry Baujan (21st season)
- Home stadium: University of Dayton Stadium

1946 Midwestern non-major college football independents records
	Conf.			Overall
Team	W	L	T	W		L		T
St. Norbert		–		8	–	0	–	0
Youngstown		–		7	–	1	–	0
Bradley		–		7	–	2	–	0
Central Michigan		–		6	–	2	–	0
Defiance		–		6	–	2	–	0
Western Michigan		–		5	–	2	–	1
Miami (OH)		–		7	–	3	–	0
Dayton		–		6	–	3	–	0
Carroll (WI)		–		4	–	2	–	1
Bowling Green		–		5	–	3	–	0
Ohio Wesleyan		–		5	–	4	–	1
Michigan Tech		–		3	–	2	–	0
Northern Michigan		–		3	–	2	–	1
Michigan State Normal		–		3	–	4	–	1
Xavier		–		3	–	7	–	0
Detroit Tech		–		1	–	6	–	1
Valparaiso		–		1	–	7	–	0
Sterling		–		1	–	8	–	0
Haskell		–		0	–	7	–	0

The 1946 Dayton Flyers football team was an American football team that represented the University of Dayton as an independent during the 1946 college football season. In their 21st and final season under head coach Harry Baujan, the Flyers compiled a 6–3 record.

Dayton was ranked at No. 96 in the final Litkenhous Difference by Score System rankings for 1946.

== Schedule ==
Date	Opponent	Site	Result	Attendance	Source
September 28	Wichita	University of Dayton Stadium; Dayton, OH	W 21–0	9,000	
October 5	Miami (OH)	University of Dayton Stadium; Dayton, OH	L 0–35	13,000	
October 12	Cincinnati	University of Dayton Stadium; Dayton, OH	L 0–19	10,000	
October 19	at Toledo	Glass Bowl; Toledo, OH	W 20–13	14,000	
October 26	Western Reserve^{†}	University of Dayton Stadium; Dayon, OH	W 20–6	8,000	
November 3	at Xavier	Xavier Stadium; Cincinnati, OH	W 33–6	10,000	
November 9	Chattanooga	University of Dayton Stadium; Dayton, OH	L 7–34	5,000	
November 16	at Ohio	Ohio Stadium; Athens, OH	W 14–7	6,000	
November 23	Marshall	University of Dayton Stadium; Dayton, OH	W 29–7	6,000	
^{†}Homecoming
