= 1946 Bradley Braves football team =

American college football season

1946 Bradley Braves football
- Conference: Independent
- Record: 7–2
- Head coach: Alfred J. Robertson (24th season)
- Home stadium: Peoria Stadium

1946 Midwestern non-major college football independents records
	Conf.			Overall
Team	W	L	T	W		L		T
St. Norbert		–		8	–	0	–	0
Youngstown		–		7	–	1	–	0
Bradley		–		7	–	2	–	0
Central Michigan		–		6	–	2	–	0
Defiance		–		6	–	2	–	0
Western Michigan		–		5	–	2	–	1
Miami (OH)		–		7	–	3	–	0
Dayton		–		6	–	3	–	0
Carroll (WI)		–		4	–	2	–	1
Bowling Green		–		5	–	3	–	0
Ohio Wesleyan		–		5	–	4	–	1
Michigan Tech		–		3	–	2	–	0
Northern Michigan		–		3	–	2	–	1
Michigan State Normal		–		3	–	4	–	1
Xavier		–		3	–	7	–	0
Detroit Tech		–		1	–	6	–	1
Valparaiso		–		1	–	7	–	0
Sterling		–		1	–	8	–	0
Haskell		–		0	–	7	–	0

The 1946 Bradley Braves football team was an American football team that represented Bradley University as an independent during the 1946 college football season. In their 24th season under head coach Alfred J. Robertson, the Braves compiled a 7–2 record and outscored opponents by a total of 173 to 105.

Bradley ranked 13th nationally among small-college teams with an average of 262.7 yards per game in total offense.

In the fall of 1946, Bradley had record enrollment of 2,893 full-time undergraduate students with another 2,000 people enrolled in special divisions.

== Schedule ==
Date	Opponent	Site	Result	Attendance	Source
September 21	Ripon	Peoria Stadium; Peoria, IL	W 19–12		
October 5	Arkansas State	Peoria Stadium; Peoria, IL	W 26–2		
October 12	Western Kentucky	Peoria Stadium; Peoria, IL	W 27–0		
October 19	at Colorado College	Colorado Springs, CO	W 20–0		
October 26	Tennessee Tech	Peoria Stadium; Peoria, IL	W 34–13	7,000	
November 2	at Miami (OH)	Miami Field; Oxford, OH	L 6–35	8,000	
November 9	North Dakota^{†}	Peoria Stadium; Peoria, IL	W 14–7	6,000	
November 15	at St. Ambrose	Davenport Municipal Stadium; Davenport, IA	W 7–0	6,000	
November 28	Saint Louis	Peoria Stadium; Peoria, IL	L 20–26		
^{†}Homecoming
