= 1946 St. Norbert Green Knights football team =

American college football season

1946 St. Norbert Green Knights football
- Conference: Independent
- Record: 8–0
- Head coach: Tom Hearden (1st season)
- Home stadium: J. R. Minahan Stadium

1946 Midwestern non-major college football independents records
	Conf.			Overall
Team	W	L	T	W		L		T
St. Norbert		–		8	–	0	–	0
Youngstown		–		7	–	1	–	0
Bradley		–		7	–	2	–	0
Central Michigan		–		6	–	2	–	0
Defiance		–		6	–	2	–	0
Western Michigan		–		5	–	2	–	1
Miami (OH)		–		7	–	3	–	0
Dayton		–		6	–	3	–	0
Carroll (WI)		–		4	–	2	–	1
Bowling Green		–		5	–	3	–	0
Ohio Wesleyan		–		5	–	4	–	1
Michigan Tech		–		3	–	2	–	0
Northern Michigan		–		3	–	2	–	1
Michigan State Normal		–		3	–	4	–	1
Xavier		–		3	–	7	–	0
Detroit Tech		–		1	–	6	–	1
Valparaiso		–		1	–	7	–	0
Sterling		–		1	–	8	–	0
Haskell		–		0	–	7	–	0

The 1946 St. Norbert Green Knights football team was an American football team that represented St. Norbert College in De Pere, Wisconsin, as an independent during the 1946 college football season. In their first year under head coach Tom Hearden, the Green Knights compiled a perfect 8–0 record and outscored opponents by a total of 216 to 26, an average of 27.25 points scored on offense and 3.25 points allowed on defense. It was the first of three perfect seasons under Hearden's leadership, along with the 1950 and 1952 seasons.

== Schedule ==
Date	Opponent	Site	Result	Attendance	Source
September 21	at Stevens Point State	Stevens Point, WI	W 54–0		
September 28	Whitewater State	J. R. Minahan Stadium; De Pere, WI	W 19–12	2,300	
October 12	at Oshkosh State	Oshkosh, WI	W 39–0		
October 19	Loras^{†}	J. R. Minahan Stadium; De Pere, WI	W 27–7	3,300	
October 26	La Crosse State	J. R. Minahan Stadium; De Pere, WI	W 20–0		
November 2	at Milwaukee State	Pearse Field; Milwaukee, WI	W 22–0		
November 10	at St. Ambrose	Davenport Municipal Stadium; Davenport, IA	W 19–7	5,500	
November 17	at Saint Joseph's (IN)	Rensselaer, IN	W 23–0		
^{†}Homecoming
