= 1946 Miami Redskins football team =

American college football season

1946 Miami Redskins football
- Conference: Independent
- Record: 7–3
- Head coach: Sid Gillman (3rd season)
- Captain: Paul Dietzel
- Home stadium: Miami Field

1946 Midwestern non-major college football independents records
	Conf.			Overall
Team	W	L	T	W		L		T
St. Norbert		–		8	–	0	–	0
Youngstown		–		7	–	1	–	0
Bradley		–		7	–	2	–	0
Central Michigan		–		6	–	2	–	0
Defiance		–		6	–	2	–	0
Western Michigan		–		5	–	2	–	1
Miami (OH)		–		7	–	3	–	0
Dayton		–		6	–	3	–	0
Carroll (WI)		–		4	–	2	–	1
Bowling Green		–		5	–	3	–	0
Ohio Wesleyan		–		5	–	4	–	1
Michigan Tech		–		3	–	2	–	0
Northern Michigan		–		3	–	2	–	1
Michigan State Normal		–		3	–	4	–	1
Xavier		–		3	–	7	–	0
Detroit Tech		–		1	–	6	–	1
Valparaiso		–		1	–	7	–	0
Sterling		–		1	–	8	–	0
Haskell		–		0	–	7	–	0

The 1946 Miami Redskins football team was an American football team that represented Miami University as an independent during the 1946 college football season. In its third season under head coach Sid Gillman, Miami compiled a 7–3 record and outscored all opponents by a combined total of 220 to 72. Paul Dietzel was the team captain.

Ara Parseghian played at the halfback position for the team. He was selected by the Pittsburgh Steelers in the 13th round (109th overall pick) of the 1947 NFL draft. He was inducted into the College Football Hall of Fame in 1980.

Mel Olix set a school record with 28 touchdown passes in 1946. The record stood for nearly 50 years.

Miami was ranked at No. 50 in the final Litkenhous Difference by Score System rankings for 1946.

== Schedule ==
Date	Opponent	Site	Result	Attendance	Source
September 21	at Purdue	Ross–Ade Stadium; West Lafayette, IN	L 7–13	23,000	
September 28	Memphis Air Transport Command	Miami Field; Oxford, OH	W 42–0		
October 5	at Dayton	University of Dayton Stadium; Dayton, OH	W 35–0	13,000	
October 12	at Bowling Green	University Stadium; Bowling Green, OH	W 6–0	5,500	
October 19	Xavier^{†}	Miami Field; Oxford, OH	W 28–6	12,000	
October 26	at Ohio	Peden Stadium; Athens, OH (rivalry)	W 23–14	12,336	
November 2	Bradley	Miami Field; Oxford, OH	W 35–6	8,000	
November 8	at Miami (FL)	Orange Bowl; Miami, FL	L 17–20	31,158	
November 16	Western Michigan	Miami Field; Oxford, OH	W 20–0		
November 28	at Cincinnati	Nippert Stadium; Cincinnati, OH (rivalry)	L 7–13	28,000	
^{†}Homecoming
