= 1946 Youngstown Penguins football team =

American college football season

1946 Youngstown Penguins football
- Conference: Independent
- Record: 7–1
- Head coach: Dike Beede (8th season)
- Home stadium: Rayen Stadium

1946 Midwestern non-major college football independents records
	Conf.			Overall
Team	W	L	T	W		L		T
St. Norbert		–		8	–	0	–	0
Youngstown		–		7	–	1	–	0
Bradley		–		7	–	2	–	0
Central Michigan		–		6	–	2	–	0
Defiance		–		6	–	2	–	0
Western Michigan		–		5	–	2	–	1
Miami (OH)		–		7	–	3	–	0
Dayton		–		6	–	3	–	0
Carroll (WI)		–		4	–	2	–	1
Bowling Green		–		5	–	3	–	0
Ohio Wesleyan		–		5	–	4	–	1
Michigan Tech		–		3	–	2	–	0
Northern Michigan		–		3	–	2	–	1
Michigan State Normal		–		3	–	4	–	1
Xavier		–		3	–	7	–	0
Detroit Tech		–		1	–	6	–	1
Valparaiso		–		1	–	7	–	0
Sterling		–		1	–	8	–	0
Haskell		–		0	–	7	–	0

The 1946 Youngstown Penguins football team was an American football team that represented Youngstown College (now known as Youngstown State University) as an independent during the 1946 college football season. In their eighth year under head coach Dike Beede, the Penguins compiled a 7–1 record and outscored opponents by a total of 190 to 89. They played their home games at Rayen Stadium in Youngstown, Ohio.

== Schedule ==
Date	Time	Opponent	Site	Result	Attendance	Source
September 19		at Geneva	Reeves Field; Beaver Falls, PA	W 26–0	12,000	
September 28		at St. Bonaventure	Olean, NY; St. Bonaventure, NY	W 20–14		
October 4		Western Reserve	Rayen Stadium; Youngstown, OH	L 13–20	15,000	
October 19		Saint Vincent	Rayen Stadium; Youngstown, OH	W 25–14	8,500	
October 26		at Lebanon Valley	Annville, PA	W 20–6		
November 1		at Scranton	Youngstown, OH	W 33–14	10,000	
November 9	2:30 p.m.	Morris Harvey	Rayen Stadium; Youngstown, OH	W 28–14	4,500	
November 15		Waynesburg	Rayen Stadium; Youngstown, OH	W 25–7	7,500	
All times are in Eastern time
