= 1946 Haskell Indians football team =

American college football season

1946 Haskell Indians football
- Conference: Independent
- Record: 0–8
- Home stadium: Haskell Stadium

1946 Midwestern non-major college football independents records
	Conf.			Overall
Team	W	L	T	W		L		T
St. Norbert		–		8	–	0	–	0
Youngstown		–		7	–	1	–	0
Bradley		–		7	–	2	–	0
Central Michigan		–		6	–	2	–	0
Defiance		–		6	–	2	–	0
Western Michigan		–		5	–	2	–	1
Miami (OH)		–		7	–	3	–	0
Dayton		–		6	–	3	–	0
Carroll (WI)		–		4	–	2	–	1
Bowling Green		–		5	–	3	–	0
Ohio Wesleyan		–		5	–	4	–	1
Michigan Tech		–		3	–	2	–	0
Northern Michigan		–		3	–	2	–	1
Michigan State Normal		–		3	–	4	–	1
Xavier		–		3	–	7	–	0
Detroit Tech		–		1	–	6	–	1
Valparaiso		–		1	–	7	–	0
Sterling		–		1	–	8	–	0
Haskell		–		0	–	7	–	0

The 1946 Haskell Indians football team was an American football that represented the Haskell Institute—now known as Haskell Indian Nations University—as an independent during the 1946 college football season. Haskell compiled a record of 0–8.

== Schedule ==
Date	Time	Opponent	Site	Result	Source
September 21		Ottawa (KS)	Lawrence, KS	L 0–45	
September 27	8:00 p.m.	at College of Emporia	Schaffner Field; Emporia, KS	L 7–26	
October 4		at Fort Scott	Fort Scott, KS	L 0–32	
October 18		at Northeastern Oklahoma	Miami, OK	L 6–27	
October 26	8:00 p.m.	Kansas City JC (KS)	Haskell Stadium; Lawrence, KS	L 0–7	
November 1		at Kemper	Boonville, MO	L 0–13	
November 8		at Baker	Baldwin City, KS	L 0–49	
November 15		at Wentworth	Lexington, MO	L 0–30	
All times are in Central time
