= 1946 Murray State Thoroughbreds football team =

American college football season

1946 Murray State Thoroughbreds football
- Conference: Kentucky Intercollegiate Athletic Conference
- Record: 5–5 (2–1 KIAC)
- Head coach: Jim Moore (2nd season)

1946 Kentucky Intercollegiate Athletic Conference football standings
	Conf.					Overall
Team	W		L		T	W		L		T
Eastern Kentucky $	3	–	1	–	0	5	–	4	–	0
Morehead State	2	–	1	–	0	6	–	1	–	0
Murray State	2	–	1	–	0	5	–	5	–	0
Louisville	2	–	2	–	0	6	–	2	–	0
Western Kentucky State Teachers	1	–	3	–	0	2	–	6	–	0
Georgetown (KY)	0	–	2	–	0	2	–	6	–	1
$ – Conference champion

The 1946 Murray State Thoroughbreds football team represented Murray State Teachers College (now known as Murray State University) as a member of the Kentucky Intercollegiate Athletic Conference (KIAC) during the 1946 college football season. In their second season under head coach Jim Moore, who had coached the team in 1941, the Thoroughbreds compiled an overall record of 5–5 with a mark of 2–1 in conference play tying for secon place in the KIAC.

== Schedule ==
Date	Opponent	Site	Result	Attendance	Source
September 28	at Ohio*	Peden Stadium; Athens, OH	L 7-27	7,000	
October 5	Morehead State	Murray, KY	W 38-19		
October 12	Eastern Kentucky	Murray, KY	L 13-26		
October 18	at Chattanooga*	Chamberlain Field; Chattanooga, TN	L 13-26		
October 26	at Evansville*	Evansville, IN	L 0-20		
November 2	Mississippi State*	Scott Field; Starkville, MS	L 0–69		
November 9	Marshall*	Murray, KY	W 19-0		
November 15	Eastern Illinois*	Murray, KY	W 38-13		
November 22	vs. Tennessee Tech*	Paducah, KY	W 20-13		
November 30	at Western Kentucky	Bowling Green, KY (rivalry)	W 55-6		
*Non-conference game
