= 1952 St. Norbert Green Knights football team =

American college football season

1952 St. Norbert Green Knights football

Midlands champion
- Conference: Midlands Conference
- Record: 6–0 (4–0 Midlands)
- Head coach: Tom Hearden (7th season)
- Home stadium: J. R. Minahan Stadium, City Stadium

1952 Midlands Conference football standings
	Conf.					Overall
Team	W		L		T	W		L		T
St. Norbert $	4	–	0	–	0	6	–	0	–	0
Loras	3	–	1	–	0	8	–	1	–	0
St. Ambrose	2	–	2	–	0	4	–	5	–	0
Lewis	0	–	3	–	1	2	–	5	–	1
Saint Joseph's (IN)	0	–	3	–	1	0	–	8	–	1
$ – Conference champion

The 1952 St. Norbert Green Knights football team was an American football team that represented St. Norbert College as a member of the Midlands Conference during the 1952 college football season. In their seventh and final year under head coach Tom Hearden, the Knights compiled a perfect 6–0 record (4–0 in conference games), won the Midlands Conference championship, shut out four opponents, and outscored all opponents by a total of 105 to 20. It was the third of three perfect seasons under Hearden's leadership, along with the 1946 and 1950 seasons.

The team played two home games at Minahan Stadium in De Pere, Wisconsin, and one at City Stadium in Green Bay, Wisconsin.

== Schedule ==
Date	Opponent	Site	Result	Attendance	Source
September 18	at La Crosse State*	Memorial Field; La Crosse, WI	W 14–0	4,000	
October 4	Great Lakes Navy*	City Stadium; Green Bay, WI	W 20–14	4,000	
October 12	at St. Ambrose	Davenport, IA	W 7–0	3,000	
October 18	Lewis	Minahan Stadium; De Pere, WI	W 7–6	3,000	
November 1	Loras	Minahan Stadium; De Pere, WI	W 21–0	3,000	
November 9	at Saint Joseph's (IN)	Rensselaer, IN	W 36–0		
*Non-conference game
