= Chiao-Min Chu =

Chinese-American engineer

Chiao-Min Chu (3 March 1919 – 6 December 1996) was a Chinese-American engineer. Born on 3 March 1919, Chu received his bachelor's degree in engineering from National Wuhan University in 1939, and completed his subsequent education in the United States. He became a fellow of the University of Michigan in 1945, one year before he earned a master's degree in engineering. Upon the completion of his doctorate in 1952, Chu taught at the Detroit Institute of Technology as assistant and associate professor. In 1955, Chu returned to the University of Michigan as an associate research engineer. The following year, Chu began teaching at his alma mater as an assistant professor. He was named an associate professor at Michigan in 1958, and rose to full professor status in 1963. Chu retired in 1989, and was granted emeritus status. He was also a fellow member of the Institute of Electrical and Electronics Engineers. Chu was married to May Shou-Mei Keh (1929–2014) from 1954 to his death on 6 December 1996.
