= 1946 Bowling Green Falcons football team =

American college football season

1946 Bowling Green Falcons football
- Conference: Independent
- Record: 5–3
- Head coach: Robert Whittaker (6th season)
- Captains: Wayne Bordner; Stanley Yoder
- Home stadium: University Stadium

1946 Midwestern non-major college football independents records
	Conf.			Overall
Team	W	L	T	W		L		T
St. Norbert		–		8	–	0	–	0
Youngstown		–		7	–	1	–	0
Bradley		–		7	–	2	–	0
Central Michigan		–		6	–	2	–	0
Defiance		–		6	–	2	–	0
Western Michigan		–		5	–	2	–	1
Miami (OH)		–		7	–	3	–	0
Dayton		–		6	–	3	–	0
Carroll (WI)		–		4	–	2	–	1
Bowling Green		–		5	–	3	–	0
Ohio Wesleyan		–		5	–	4	–	1
Michigan Tech		–		3	–	2	–	0
Northern Michigan		–		3	–	2	–	1
Michigan State Normal		–		3	–	4	–	1
Xavier		–		3	–	7	–	0
Detroit Tech		–		1	–	6	–	1
Valparaiso		–		1	–	7	–	0
Sterling		–		1	–	8	–	0
Haskell		–		0	–	7	–	0

The 1946 Bowling Green Falcons football team was an American football team that represented Bowling Green State College (later renamed Bowling Green State University) as an independent during the 1946 college football season. In its sixth season under head coach Robert Whittaker, the team compiled a 5–3 record and outscored opponents by a total of 95 to 39. Wayne Bordner and Stanley Yoder were the team captains.

Bowling Green was ranked at No. 98 in the final Litkenhous Difference by Score System rankings for 1946.

The team played its home games at University Stadium in Bowling Green, Ohio.

== Schedule ==
Date	Opponent	Site	Result	Source
September 27	at Central Michigan	Alumni Field; Mount Pleasant, MI	L 0–7	
October 5	Ball State	University Stadium; Bowling Green, OH	W 13–0	
October 12	Miami (OH)	University Stadium; Bowling Green, OH	L 0–6	
October 19	at Kent State	Memorial Stadium (rivalry); Kent, OH	W 13–0	
October 25	at Canisius	Civic Stadium; Buffalo, NY	W 13–7	
November 2	Oberlin	University Stadium; Bowling Green, OH	W 14–0	
November 9	at St. Bonaventure	Forness Stadium; Olean, NY	L 9–13	
November 16	Xavier	University Stadium; Bowling Green, OH	W 33–6	
