= List of Miami RedHawks men's basketball head coaches =

The following is a list of Miami RedHawks men's basketball head coaches. There have been 28 head coaches of the RedHawks in their 120-season history.

Miami's current head coach is Travis Steele. He was hired as the RedHawks' head coach in March 2022, replacing Jack Owens, who was fired after the 2021–22 season.

No.	Tenure	Coach	Years	Record	Pct.
1	1905–1906	Carroll Hoel	1	3–3	.500
2	1906–1907	John Snyder	1	2–4	.333
3	1907–1908	C. H. Martin	1	1–7	.125
4	1908–1912	F. W. Stone	4	17–20	.459
5	1912–1913	M. Hoskins	1	4–8	.333
6	1913–1914	A. D. Browne	1	6–7	.462
7	1914–1915	Howard Flack	1	4–9	.308
8	1915–1916	Chester J. Roberts	1	4–9	.308
9	1916–1917; 1919–1922	George Little	4	43–21	.672
10	1917–1919	George Rider	2	17–5	.773
11	1922–1924	Harry W. Ewing	2	11–15	.423
12	1924–1930	Roy Tillotson	6	44–49	.473
13	1930–1938	John Mauer	8	46–80	.365
14	1938–1939	Weeb Ewbank	1	5–13	.278
15	1939–1942	Rip Van Winkle	3	28–22	.560
16	1942–1949	Blue Foster	7	74–59	.556
17	1949–1951	John Brickels	2	15–28	.349
18	1951–1957	Bill Rohr	6	91–47	.659
19	1957–1966	Dick Shrider	9	126–96	.568
20	1966–1970	Tates Locke	4	56–42	.571
21	1970–1984	Darrell Hedric	14	216–157	.579
22	1984–1990 (Note: Miami forfeited eight games from the 1988–89 season. Peirson's on-court record is 93–81 (.534).)	Jerry Peirson	6	85–89	.489
23	1990–1993	Joby Wright	3	61–29	.678
24	1993–1996	Herb Sendek	3	63–26	.708
25	1996–2012	Charlie Coles	16	263–224	.540
–	2008* (Note: Henderson served as interim head coach for five games during the 2007–08 season as Charlie Coles recovered from a heart procedure.)	Jermaine Henderson	1	3–2	.600
26	2012–2017	John Cooper	5	59–100	.371
27	2017–2022	Jack Owens	5	70–86	.449
28	2022–present	Travis Steele	3	52–46	.531
Totals		28 coaches	118 seasons	1,479–1,290	.534
Records updated through end of 2024–25 season Source
