= 1946 Illinois State Normal Redbirds football team =

American college football season

1946 Illinois State Normal Redbirds football
- Conference: Illinois Intercollegiate Athletic Conference
- Record: 6–3 (2–2 IIAC)
- Head coach: Edwin Struck (2nd season)
- MVP: Aldo Sebben
- Captain: Aldo Sebben
- Home stadium: McCormick Field

1946 Illinois Intercollegiate Athletic Conference football standings
| | Conf. | | | | | Overall |
| Team | W | | L | | T | W | | L | | T |
|---|---|---|---|---|---|---|---|---|---|---|
| Northern Illinois State $ | 4 | – | 0 | – | 0 | 9 | – | 2 | – | 0 |
| Southern Illinois | 3 | – | 1 | – | 0 | 4 | – | 4 | – | 0 |
| Illinois State Normal | 2 | – | 2 | – | 0 | 6 | – | 3 | – | 0 |
| Eastern Illinois | 1 | – | 3 | – | 0 | 2 | – | 6 | – | 0 |
| Western Illinois | 0 | – | 4 | – | 0 | 2 | – | 6 | – | 0 |
$ – Conference champion

The 1946 Illinois State Normal Redbirds football team represented Illinois State Normal University—now known as Illinois State University—as a member of the Illinois Intercollegiate Athletic Conference (IIAC) during 1946 college football season. In their second year under head coach Edwin Struck, the Redbirds compiled an overall record of 6–3 record with a mark of 2–2 in conference play, finished third in the IIAC, and outscored opponents by a total of 106 to 53. Illinois State Normal played home games at McCormick Field in Normal, Illinois.

== Schedule ==
| Date | Opponent | Site | Result | Attendance | Source |
|---|---|---|---|---|---|
| September 21 | at Indiana State* | Terre Haute, IN | L 0–13 | | |
| September 28 | Michigan State Normal* | McCormick Field; Normal, IL | W 10–0 | | |
| October 5 | DePauw* | McCormick Field; Normal, IL | W 18–0 | | |
| October 12 | Southern Illinois | McCormick Field; Normal, IL | L 7–13 | | |
| October 19 | Western Illinois^{†} | McCormick Field; Normal, IL | W 15–0 | 5,000 | |
| October 26 | at Eastern Illinois | Schahrer Field; Charleston, IL | W 26–13 | 5,000 | |
| November 2 | Millikin* | McCormick Field; Normal, IL | W 20–0 | | |
| November 9 | at Northern Illinois | Glidden Field; DeKalb, IL | L 3–14 | | |
| November 16 | at Illinois Wesleyan* | Bloomington, IL | W 7–0 | | |
*Non-conference game; ^{†}Homecoming
