= 1946 Western Michigan Broncos football team =

American college football season

1946 Western Michigan Broncos football
- Conference: Independent
- Record: 5–2–1
- Head coach: John Gill (5th season)
- MVP: Allen Bush
- Captain: Clinton Brown
- Home stadium: Waldo Stadium

1946 Midwestern non-major college football independents records
	Conf.			Overall
Team	W	L	T	W		L		T
St. Norbert		–		8	–	0	–	0
Youngstown		–		7	–	1	–	0
Bradley		–		7	–	2	–	0
Central Michigan		–		6	–	2	–	0
Defiance		–		6	–	2	–	0
Western Michigan		–		5	–	2	–	1
Miami (OH)		–		7	–	3	–	0
Dayton		–		6	–	3	–	0
Carroll (WI)		–		4	–	2	–	1
Bowling Green		–		5	–	3	–	0
Ohio Wesleyan		–		5	–	4	–	1
Michigan Tech		–		3	–	2	–	0
Northern Michigan		–		3	–	2	–	1
Michigan State Normal		–		3	–	4	–	1
Xavier		–		3	–	7	–	0
Detroit Tech		–		1	–	6	–	1
Valparaiso		–		1	–	7	–	0
Sterling		–		1	–	8	–	0
Haskell		–		0	–	7	–	0

The 1946 Western Michigan Broncos football team was an American football team that represented Michigan College of Education (later renamed Western Michigan University) as an independent during the 1946 college football season. In their fifth season under head coach John Gill, the Broncos compiled a 5–2–1 record and outscored their opponents, 158 to 100. The team played its home games at Waldo Stadium in Kalamazoo, Michigan.

Tackle Clinton Brown was the team captain. Halfback Allen Bush received the team's most outstanding player award.

Western Michigan was ranked at No. 97 in the final Litkenhous Difference by Score System rankings for 1946.

== Schedule ==
Date	Opponent	Site	Result	Attendance	Source
September 28	Ripon	Waldo Stadium; Kalamazoo, MI	W 47–0		
October 5	Ohio	Waldo Stadium; Kalamazoo, MI	L 7–25		
October 12	Butler	Waldo Stadium; Kalamazoo, MI	W 19–0	3,500	
October 19	at Iowa State Teachers	O. R. Latham Field; Cedar Falls, IA	T 0–0		
October 26	at Western Kentucky State Teachers	Bowling Green, KY	W 32–21		
November 2	Central Michigan	Waldo Stadium; Kalamazoo, MI (rivalry)	W 27–21	12,500	
November 8	Valparaiso	Waldo Stadium; Kalamazoo, MI	W 26–13	3,500	
November 16	at Miami (OH)	Miami Field; Oxford, OH	L 0–20		
