= 1946 Eastern Illinois Panthers football team =

American college football season

1946 Eastern Illinois Panthers football
- Conference: Illinois Intercollegiate Athletic Conference
- Record: 2–6 (1–3 IIAC)
- Head coach: Maynard O'Brien (1st season)
- Home stadium: Schahrer Field

1946 Illinois Intercollegiate Athletic Conference football standings
	Conf.					Overall
Team	W		L		T	W		L		T
Northern Illinois State $	4	–	0	–	0	9	–	2	–	0
Southern Illinois	3	–	1	–	0	4	–	4	–	0
Illinois State Normal	2	–	2	–	0	6	–	3	–	0
Eastern Illinois	1	–	3	–	0	2	–	6	–	0
Western Illinois	0	–	4	–	0	2	–	6	–	0
$ – Conference champion

The 1946 Eastern Illinois Panthers football team represented Eastern Illinois University as a member of the Illinois Intercollegiate Athletic Conference (IIAC) during the 1946 college football season. The team was led by first-year head coach Maynard O'Brien and played their home games at Schahrer Field in Charleston, Illinois. The Panthers finished the season with a 2–6 record overall and a 1–3 record in conference play.

== Schedule ==
Date	Opponent	Site	Result	Attendance	Source
September 28	at Butler*	Indianapolis, IN	L 12–19	8,000	
October 4	at Northern Illinois State	Glidden Field; DeKalb, IL	L 0–26		
October 11	Western Illinois	Schahrer Field; Charleston, IL	W 20–12		
October 19	Millikin*	Schahrer Field; Charleston, IL	W 7–0		
October 26	Illinois State Normal^{†}	Schahrer Field; Charleston, IL (rivalry)	L 13–26	5,000	
November 2	at Southern Illinois	McAndrew Stadium; Carbondale, IL	L 0–20		
November 9	at Indiana State*	Terre Haute, IN	L 0–13		
November 15	at Murray State*	Murray, KY	L 13–38		
*Non-conference game; ^{†}Homecoming
