= Tom Hearden =

American football player and coach (1904–1964)

Biographical details
- Born: September 8, 1904; Appleton, Wisconsin, U.S.
- Died: December 27, 1964 (aged 60); Green Bay, Wisconsin, U.S.

Playing career
- 1924–1926: Notre Dame
- 1927–1928: Green Bay Packers
- 1929: Chicago Bears
- Position: Halfback

Coaching career (HC unless noted)
- 1930–1933: Racine St. Catherine's HS (WI)
- 1934–1935: Racine Park HS (WI)
- 1936: Green Bay East HS (WI)
- 1946–1952: St. Norbert
- 1954–1955: Green Bay Packers (assistant)
- 1956: Wisconsin (assistant)

Head coaching record
- Overall: 40–14 (college); 85–11–7

Accomplishments and honors

Championships
- 2 Midlands (1950, 1952)

Thomas Francis "Red" Hearden (September 8, 1904 – December 27, 1964) was an American football player and coach. He played college football at the University of Notre Dame, under head coach Knute Rockne, and professionally in the National Football League (NFL) as a halfback for the Green Bay Packers, under head coach Curly Lambeau, and the Chicago Bears, under head coach George Halas. Hearden served as the head football coach at St. Norbert College in De Pere, Wisconsin from 1946 to 1952, compiling a record of 40–14.

== Early life and college career ==
Hearden was born in Appleton, Wisconsin, and moved, as a boy, with his family to Green Bay, Wisconsin. From 1920 to 1922, he played in the backfield for Green Bay East High School's football team with his brothers and Jim Crowley.

As a sophomore at the University of Notre Dame, Hearden was a member of the 1924 Notre Dame Fighting Irish football team that featured the Four Horsemen backfield, including Crowley. That team defeated Stanford, led by Ernie Nevers and coached by Pop Warner, in the 1925 Rose Bowl, although Hearden did not appear in that game. He was captain of the 1926 Notre Dame Fighting Irish football team in his senior year and a three-year letterman. He played six games over three seasons for the Chicago Bears and Green Bay Packers.

== Coaching career ==
In 1930, Hearden began his coaching career at St. Catherine's High School in Racine, Wisconsin. He led his teams there to a record of 26–3–3 and two Catholic conference titles. He coached for Racine's Washington Park High School for the 1934 and 1935 seasons, and posted an 8–5–3 record. In 1936, Hearden returned to his alma mater, Green Bay East High School, and achieved a 51–3–1 mark through 1942. East won 32 straight games at one point and won or shared six conference titles in that seven-year stretch.

Hearden joined the navy in 1943. After the war, he returned to Wisconsin. As the head football coach at St. Norbert College from 1946 to 1952, he compiled a record of 40–14. He joined the Green Bay Packers in 1954 and stayed for two years, leaving to serve as an assistant coach at the University of Wisconsin in 1956. He returned to the Packers in 1957. Later that same year, he suffered a stroke, ending his coaching career.

== Awards and honors ==
- 1952 Notre Dame Club of Green Bay "Man of the Year"
- 1959 St. Norbert College Alma Mater Award
- 1965 WFCA Wisconsin High School Coach of the Year
- 1980 WFCA Hall of Fame
- 1986 St. Norbert College Hall of Fame

== Head coaching record ==
=== College ===
Year	Team	Overall	Conference	Standing	Bowl/playoffs
St. Norbert Green Knights (Independent) (1946–1947)
1946	St. Norbert	8–0			
1947	St. Norbert	7–1			
St. Norbert Green Knights (Midlands Conference) (1948–1952)
1948	St. Norbert	4–5	1–2	T–3rd	
1949	St. Norbert	4–4	2–1	2nd	
1950	St. Norbert	7–0	4–0	1st	
1951	St. Norbert	4–4	2–2	3rd	
1952	St. Norbert	6–0	4–0	1st	
St. Norbert:		40–14	13–5		
Total:		40–14			
National championship Conference title Conference division title or championship game berth
