= 1950 St. Norbert Green Knights football team =

American college football season

1950 St. Norbert Green Knights football

Midlands champion
- Conference: Midlands Conference
- Record: 7–0 (4–0 Midlands)
- Head coach: Tom Hearden (5th season)
- Home stadium: J. R. Minahan Stadium

1950 Midlands Conference football standings
| | Conf. | | | | | Overall |
| Team | W | | L | | T | W | | L | | T |
|---|---|---|---|---|---|---|---|---|---|---|
| St. Norbert $ | 4 | – | 0 | – | 0 | 7 | – | 0 | – | 0 |
| St. Ambrose | 3 | – | 1 | – | 0 | 12 | – | 1 | – | 0 |
| Loras | 1 | – | 2 | – | 0 | 8 | – | 3 | – | 0 |
| Lewis | 1 | – | 2 | – | 0 | 4 | – | 4 | – | 0 |
| Saint Joseph's (IN) | 0 | – | 4 | – | 0 | 1 | – | 6 | – | 1 |
$ – Conference champion

The 1950 St. Norbert Green Knights football team was an American football team that represented St. Norbert College as a member of the Midlands Conference during the 1950 college football season. In their fifth year under head coach Tom Hearden, the Knights compiled a perfect 7–0 record (4–0 in conference games), won the Midlands Conference championship, and outscored opponents by a total of 188 to 53. It was the second of three perfect seasons under Hearden's leadership, along with the 1946 and 1952 seasons.

The team played its home games at Minahan Stadium in De Pere, Wisconsin.

== Schedule ==
| Date | Opponent | Site | Result | Attendance | Source |
|---|---|---|---|---|---|
| September 16 | at Milwaukee State* | Minahan Stadium; De Pere, WI | W 26–6 | 3,000 | |
| September 23 | Quincy* | Minahan Stadium; De Pere, WI | W 20–0 | 3,100 | |
| October 1 | at Saint Joseph's (IN) | Collegeville, IN | W 26–0 | | |
| October 7 | Great Lakes Navy* | Minahan Stadium; De Pere, WI | W 34–20 | 4,000 | |
| October 15 | at St. Ambrose | Municipal Stadium; Davenport, IA | W 17–13 | 8,500 | |
| October 21 | Lewis^{†} | Minahan Stadium; De Pere, WI | W 42–7 | 3,400 | |
| November 4 | Loras | Minahan Stadium; De Pere, WI | W 23–7 | 2,900 | |
*Non-conference game; ^{†}Homecoming
