= 1946 Michigan State Normal Hurons football team =

American college football season

1946 Michigan State Normal Hurons football
- Conference: Independent
- Record: 3–4–1
- Head coach: Elton Rynearson (24th season)
- Captain: James F. Walton
- Home stadium: Briggs Field

1946 Midwestern non-major college football independents records
	Conf.			Overall
Team	W	L	T	W		L		T
St. Norbert		–		8	–	0	–	0
Youngstown		–		7	–	1	–	0
Bradley		–		7	–	2	–	0
Central Michigan		–		6	–	2	–	0
Defiance		–		6	–	2	–	0
Western Michigan		–		5	–	2	–	1
Miami (OH)		–		7	–	3	–	0
Dayton		–		6	–	3	–	0
Carroll (WI)		–		4	–	2	–	1
Bowling Green		–		5	–	3	–	0
Ohio Wesleyan		–		5	–	4	–	1
Michigan Tech		–		3	–	2	–	0
Northern Michigan		–		3	–	2	–	1
Michigan State Normal		–		3	–	4	–	1
Xavier		–		3	–	7	–	0
Detroit Tech		–		1	–	6	–	1
Valparaiso		–		1	–	7	–	0
Sterling		–		1	–	8	–	0
Haskell		–		0	–	7	–	0

The 1946 Michigan State Normal Hurons football team represented Michigan State Normal College (later renamed Eastern Michigan University) as an independent during the 1946 college football season. In their 24th season under head coach Elton Rynearson, the Hurons compiled a 1–6 record and were outscored by their opponents, 80 to 65. James F. Walton was the team captain. The team played its home games at Briggs Field on the school's campus in Ypsilanti, Michigan.

== Schedule ==
Date	Opponent	Site	Result	Attendance	Source
September 28	at Illinois State	Normal, IL	L 0–10		
October 4	at Hope	Holland, MI	L 0–13		
October 11	Alma	Briggs Field; Ypsilanti, MI	W 6–0		
October 18	Central Michigan	Briggs Field; Ypsilanti, MI (rivalry)	L 13–26		
October 26	at Hillsdale	Hillsdale, MI	L 7–18		
November 2	Albion^{†}	Briggs Field; Ypsilanti, MI	W 13–6	3,500	
November 9	at Ball State	Muncie, IN	T 7–7		
November 15	Great Lakes Navy	Briggs Field; Ypsilanti, MI	W 19–0		
^{†}Homecoming
