= 1946 Cincinnati Bearcats football team =

American college football season

1946 Cincinnati Bearcats football
- Roger Stephens broke UC rushing record in 1946

MAC champion Sun Bowl champion

Sun Bowl, W 18–6 vs. VPI
- Conference: Mid-America Conference
- Record: 9–2 (2–0 MAC)
- Head coach: Ray Nolting (2nd season)
- Captain: Elbie Nickel
- Home stadium: Nippert Stadium

1946 Mid-America Conference football standings
	Conf.					Overall
Team	W		L		T	W		L		T
Cincinnati $	2	–	0	–	0	9	–	2	–	0
Western Reserve	1	–	1	–	0	4	–	3	–	2
Ohio	0	–	1	–	0	6	–	3	–	0
Wayne	0	–	1	–	0	4	–	5	–	0
$ – Conference champion

The 1946 Cincinnati Bearcats football team was an American football team that represented the University of Cincinnati in the Mid-America Conference (MAC) during the 1946 college football season. In their second year under head coach Ray Nolting, the Bearcats compiled a 9–2 record, outscored opponents by a total of 221 to 93, and won the MAC championship. Their regular season highlights included victories over major college powers including Indiana (ranked No. 20 in the final AP poll) and Michigan State. Cincinnati closed its season with a victory over Virginia Tech, 18–6, in the Sun Bowl. The team tallied 276 rushing yards in the Sun Bowl while holding Virginia Tech to only 35 rushing yards. Hal Johnson, Al Sabato, and Don McMillan scored Cincinnati touchdowns.

Roger Stephens led the Bearcats and ranked sixth nationally with 774 rushing yards and led the nation with an average of 7.66 yards per carry. Cincinnati was ranked at No. 42 in the final Litkenhous Difference by Score System rankings for 1946.

== Schedule ==
Date	Opponent	Site	Result	Attendance	Source
September 21	at Indiana*	Memorial Stadium; Bloomington, IN	W 15–6	15,000	
September 28	Kentucky*	Nippert Stadium; Cincinnati, OH	L 7–26	27,000	
October 5	Marshall*	Nippert Stadium; Cincinnati, OH	W 39–14	20,000	
October 12	at Dayton*	Dayton Stadium; Dayton, OH	W 19–0	10,000	
October 19	Ohio^{†}	Nippert Stadium; Cincinnati, OH	W 19–0	25,000	
October 26	at Michigan State*	Macklin Field; East Lansing, MI	W 18–7	22,524	
November 2	at Tulsa*	Skelly Stadium; Tulsa, OK	L 0–20	10,000	
November 9	Xavier*	Nippert Stadium; Cincinnati, OH (rivalry)	W 39–0	17,000	
November 16	Western Reserve	Nippert Stadium; Cincinnati, OH	W 34–7	7,500	
November 28	Miami (OH)*	Nippert Stadium; Cincinnati, OH (Victory Bell)	W 13–7	28,000	
January 1, 1947	vs. VPI*	Kidd Field; El Paso, TX (Sun Bowl)	W 18–6	10,000-11,000	
*Non-conference game; ^{†}Homecoming

== Players ==
- Bert Bauer, center, 208 pounds
- Tom Blake, guard/linebacker, No. 50, 200 pounds
- Jim Dougherty, halfback, No. 13
- Bob Fenlon, guard, No. 22, 220 pounds
- Ollie Freese, halfback
- Mike Graham, fullback
- Stan Klimczak, end, freshman, 188 pounds
- Dick Langenbeck, tackle, No. 38, 225 pounds
- Don McMillan, quarterback, No. 15, 175 pounds
- Elbie Nickel, captain and end, No. 33, 200 pounds
- Tom O'Malley, quarterback
- Fred Redeker, fullback, No. 31, 220 pounds
- Alkie Richards, halfback, No. 21, 178 pounds
- Al Sabato, linebacker
- Floyd Shorts, center, No. 41
- Bill Smyth, tackle, No. 49, 220 pounds
- Wille Stargel, end
- "Racing" Roger Stephens, halfback, No. 23, 183 pounds
- Max Wharton, end, No. 51, 210 pounds

== After the season ==
The 1947 NFL Draft was held on December 16, 1946. The following Bearcats were selected.

Round	Pick	Player	Position	NFL Club
6	42	Roger Stephens	Back	Chicago Bears
17	149	Elbie Nickel	End	Pittsburgh Steelers
25	232	Fred Redeker	Back	Green Bay Packers
29	272	Dick Langenbeck	Tackle	Philadelphia Eagles
