= 1946 Eastern Kentucky Maroons football team =

American college football season

1946 Eastern Kentucky Maroons football

KIAC champion
- Conference: Kentucky Intercollegiate Athletic Conference
- Record: 5–4 (3–1 KIAC)
- Head coach: Rome Rankin (10th season)

1946 Kentucky Intercollegiate Athletic Conference football standings
	Conf.					Overall
Team	W		L		T	W		L		T
Eastern Kentucky $	3	–	1	–	0	5	–	4	–	0
Morehead State	2	–	1	–	0	6	–	1	–	0
Murray State	2	–	1	–	0	5	–	5	–	0
Louisville	2	–	2	–	0	6	–	2	–	0
Western Kentucky State Teachers	1	–	3	–	0	2	–	6	–	0
Georgetown (KY)	0	–	2	–	0	2	–	6	–	1
$ – Conference champion

The 1946 Eastern Kentucky Maroons football team was an American football team that represented Eastern Kentucky State College (now known as Eastern Kentucky University) as a member of the Kentucky Intercollegiate Athletic Conference (KIAC) during the 1946 college football season. In their tenth and final season under head coach Rome Rankin, the Maroons compiled a 5–4 record (3–1 against KIAC opponents), won the KIAC championship, and outscored opponents by a total of 112 to 88.

== Schedule ==
Date	Opponent	Site	Result	Source
September 20	at Tennessee Poly*	Cokeville, TN	W 13–0	
September 28	at Catawba*	Shuford Field; Salisbury, NC	L 7–9	
October 5	Central Michigan*^{†}	Richmond, KY	L 7–20	
October 12	at Murray State	Murray, KY	W 26–13	
October 19	Tennessee Poly*	Richmond, KY	L 7–20	
October 26	Valparaiso*	Richmond, KY	W 12–7	
November 2	at Morehead State	Morehead, KY	L 6–12	
November 9	Louisville	Richmond, KY	W 28–7	
November 16	at Western Kentucky State Teachers	Bowling Green, KY (rivalry)	W 6–0	
*Non-conference game; ^{†}Homecoming
