= 1946 Southern Illinois Maroons football team =

American college football season

1946 Southern Illinois Maroons football
- Conference: Illinois Intercollegiate Athletic Conference
- Record: 4–4 (3–1 IIAC)
- Head coach: Glenn Martin (7th season)
- Home stadium: McAndrew Stadium

1946 Illinois Intercollegiate Athletic Conference football standings
	Conf.					Overall
Team	W		L		T	W		L		T
Northern Illinois State $	4	–	0	–	0	9	–	2	–	0
Southern Illinois	3	–	1	–	0	4	–	4	–	0
Illinois State Normal	2	–	2	–	0	6	–	3	–	0
Eastern Illinois	1	–	3	–	0	2	–	6	–	0
Western Illinois	0	–	4	–	0	2	–	6	–	0
$ – Conference champion

The 1946 Southern Illinois Maroons football team was an American football team that represented Southern Illinois Normal University (now known as Southern Illinois University Carbondale) in the Illinois Intercollegiate Athletic Conference (IIAC) during the 1946 college football season. Under seventh-year head coach Glenn Martin, the team compiled a 4–4 record. The team played its home games at McAndrew Stadium in Carbondale, Illinois.

== Schedule ==
Date	Opponent	Site	Result	Attendance	Source
September 28	Northeast Missouri State*	McAndrew Stadium; Carbondale, IL	W 6–0		
October 5	Southeast Missouri State*	McAndrew Stadium; Carbondale, IL	L 13–20		
October 12	at Illinois State Normal	McCormick Field; Normal, IL	W 13–7		
October 19	Arkansas State*	McAndrew Stadium; Carbondale, IL	L 12–14		
October 26	at Western Illinois	Morgan Field; Macomb, IL	W 19–7		
November 2	Eastern Illinois	McAndrew Stadium; Carbondale, IL	W 29–0		
November 9	at Evansville*	Reitz Bowl; Evansville, IN	L 7–21	6,500	
November 16	Northern Illinois State	McAndrew Stadium; Carbondale, IL	L 0–10		
*Non-conference game
