= 1946 Louisville Cardinals football team =

American college football season

1946 Louisville Cardinals football
- Conference: Kentucky Intercollegiate Athletic Conference
- Record: 6–2 (2–2 KIAC)
- Head coach: Frank Camp (1st season)
- Home stadium: Parkway Field

1946 Kentucky Intercollegiate Athletic Conference football standings
	Conf.					Overall
Team	W		L		T	W		L		T
Eastern Kentucky $	3	–	1	–	0	5	–	4	–	0
Morehead State	2	–	1	–	0	6	–	1	–	0
Murray State	2	–	1	–	0	5	–	5	–	0
Louisville	2	–	2	–	0	6	–	2	–	0
Western Kentucky State Teachers	1	–	3	–	0	2	–	6	–	0
Georgetown (KY)	0	–	2	–	0	2	–	6	–	1
$ – Conference champion

The 1946 Louisville Cardinals football team was an American football team that represented the University of Louisville as a member of the Kentucky Intercollegiate Athletic Conference (KIAC) during the 1946 college football season. In their first season under head coach Frank Camp, the Cardinals compiled an overall record of 6–2 with a mark of 2–2 in conference play, placing fourth in the KIAC.

== Schedule ==
Date	Opponent	Site	Result	Attendance	Source
September 26	at Evansville*	Evansville, IN	W 13–7		
October 4	Wittenberg*	Louisville, KY	W 19–0	6,000	
October 11	at Georgetown (KY)	Georgetown, KY	W 20–0		
October 19	at Western Kentucky State Teachers	Bowling Green, KY	L 19–20	4,000	
October 25	Georgetown (KY)	Parkway Field; Louisville, KY	W 20–0	7,500	
November 2	Saint Joseph's (IN)*	Louisville, KY	W 13–7	7,500	
November 9	at Eastern Kentucky	Richmond, KY	L 7–28		
November 16	Union (TN)*^{†}	Louisville, KY	W 25–0	4,000	
*Non-conference game; ^{†}Homecoming
