= 1946 Western Kentucky State Teachers Hilltoppers football team =

American college football season

1946 Western Kentucky State Teachers Hilltoppers football
- Conference: Kentucky Intercollegiate Athletic Conference
- Record: 2–6 (1–3 KIAC)
- Head coach: Jesse Thomas (2nd season)
- Captains: Dallas Arnold; Rapheal "Boots" Able

1946 Kentucky Intercollegiate Athletic Conference football standings
| | Conf. | | | | | Overall |
| Team | W | | L | | T | W | | L | | T |
|---|---|---|---|---|---|---|---|---|---|---|
| Eastern Kentucky $ | 3 | – | 1 | – | 0 | 5 | – | 4 | – | 0 |
| Morehead State | 2 | – | 1 | – | 0 | 6 | – | 1 | – | 0 |
| Murray State | 2 | – | 1 | – | 0 | 5 | – | 5 | – | 0 |
| Louisville | 2 | – | 2 | – | 0 | 6 | – | 2 | – | 0 |
| Western Kentucky State Teachers | 1 | – | 3 | – | 0 | 2 | – | 6 | – | 0 |
| Georgetown (KY) | 0 | – | 2 | – | 0 | 2 | – | 6 | – | 1 |
$ – Conference champion

The 1946 Western Kentucky State Teachers Hilltoppers football team represented Western Kentucky State Teachers College (now known as Western Kentucky University) as a member of the Kentucky Intercollegiate Athletic Conference (KIAC) during the 1946 college football season. Led by Jesse Thomas, who returned for his second season as head coach after helming the team in 1933, the Hilltoppers compiled an overall record of 2–6 with a mark of 1–3 in conference play. The team's captains were Dallas Arnold and Rapheal "Boots" Able.

== Schedule ==
| Date | Opponent | Site | Result | Attendance | Source |
|---|---|---|---|---|---|
| October 4 | at Austin Peay* | Municipal Stadium; Clarksville, TN | W 25–6 | | |
| October 12 | at Bradley* | Peoria, IL | L 0–27 | | |
| October 19 | Louisville | Bowling Green, KY | W 20–19 | 4,000 | |
| October 25 | Western Michigan*^{†} | Bowling Green, KY | L 20–32 | | |
| November 1 | at Tennessee Tech* | Cookeville, TN | L 6–32 | | |
| November 8 | at Morehead State | Morehead, KY | L 7–36 | | |
| November 16 | Eastern Kentucky | Bowling Green, KY (rivalry) | L 0–6 | | |
| November 27 | Murray State | Bowling Green, KY (rivalry) | L 6–55 | | |
*Non-conference game; ^{†}Homecoming
