= John Tripson =

American football player (1919–1997)

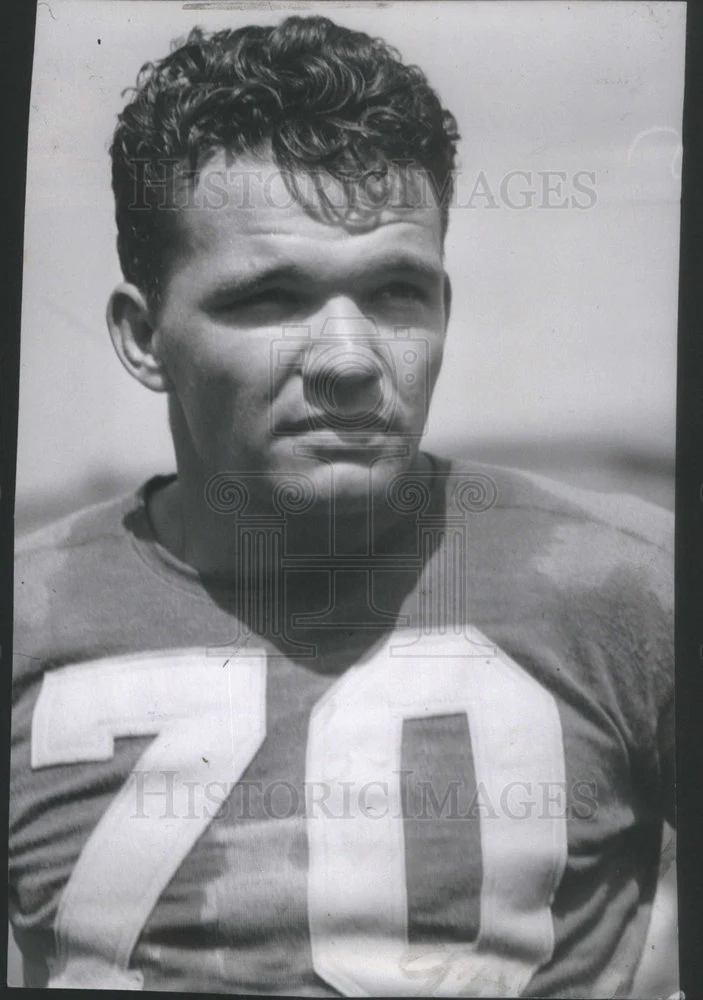

No. 70
- Position: Offensive tackle

Personal information
- Born: September 17, 1919; Madero, Texas, U.S.
- Died: July 15, 1997 (aged 77); Vero Beach, Florida, U.S.
- Listed height: 6 ft 3 in (1.91 m)
- Listed weight: 220 lb (100 kg)

Career information
- High school: Mission (Mission, Texas)
- College: Mississippi State (1937-1940)
- NFL draft: 1941: 6th round, 45th overall pick

Career history
- Detroit Lions (1941)

Awards and highlights
- Pro Bowl (1941)

Career NFL statistics
- Games played: 11
- Games started: 9
- Stats at Pro Football Reference

John Robert Tripson (September 17, 1919 – July 15, 1997) was a professional American football offensive tackle in the National Football League (NFL). He played one season for the Detroit Lions, who selected him in the sixth round of the 1941 NFL Draft with the 45th overall pick.

In addition to his football career, Tripson received the Navy Cross for gallantry in the invasion of North Africa in World War II, along with fellow former NFL player Robert Halperin. Tripson was an early member of the Navy Scouts and Raiders, a precursor group to the Navy Seals, where he was close with fellow former NFL player turned warrior, Phil H. Bucklew. Tripson continued on to be an instructor at the Navy Scouts and Raiders school at Fort Piece, Florida.
