= 1946 Western Reserve Red Cats football team =

American college football season

1946 Western Reserve Red Cats football
- Conference: Mid-America Conference
- Record: 4–3–2 (1–1 MAC)
- Head coach: Tom Davies (3rd season)
- Home stadium: Shaw Stadium

1946 Mid-America Conference football standings
	Conf.					Overall
Team	W		L		T	W		L		T
Cincinnati $	2	–	0	–	0	9	–	2	–	0
Western Reserve	1	–	1	–	0	4	–	3	–	2
Ohio	0	–	1	–	0	6	–	3	–	0
Wayne	0	–	1	–	0	4	–	5	–	0
$ – Conference champion

The 1946 Western Reserve Red Cats football team represented the Western Reserve University, now known as Case Western Reserve University, in the Mid-America Conference during the 1946 college football season. The team was coached by Tom Davies, assisted by Dick Luther. The featured star player, and future NFL Pro Bowler, was Warren Lahr. Two other notable players were George Roman and Stan Skoczen.

== Schedule ==
Date	Opponent	Site	Result	Attendance	Source
September 28	at Toledo*	Glass Bowl; Toledo, OH	T 14–14		
October 4	at Youngstown*	Rayen Stadium; Youngstown, OH	W 20–13		
October 12	Wayne	Shaw Stadium; East Cleveland, OH	W 7–0		
October 18	Baldwin–Wallace*	Shaw Stadium; East Cleveland, OH	T 13–13		
October 26	at Dayton*	Baujan Field; Dayton, OH	L 6–20	8,000	
November 2	Akron*	Shaw Stadium; East Cleveland, OH	L 6–13		
November 9	John Carroll*	Shaw Stadium; East Cleveland, OH	W 13–7		
November 16	at Cincinnati	Nippert Stadium; Cincinnati, OH	L 7–34	7,500	
November 28	vs. Case*	Municipal Stadium; Cleveland, OH	W 24–0	13,000	
*Non-conference game
