= Phil H. Bucklew =

American football player and US Navy officer (1914–1992)

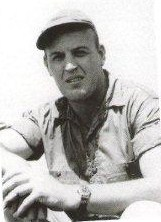
- Bucklew in 1944
- Born: December 18, 1914; Columbus, Ohio, US
- Died: December 30, 1992 (aged 78); Fairfax, Virginia, US
- Burial place: Arlington National Cemetery
- Military career
- Allegiance: United States of America
- Branch: United States Navy
- Service years: 1930–1934, 1942–1969
- Rank: Captain
- Nickname: Buck
- Unit: SEALs
- Commands: Naval Special Warfare Group One
- Conflicts: World War II; Korean War; Vietnam War
- Awards: Navy Cross (2); Silver Star; Bronze Star; Croix de Guerre (France)

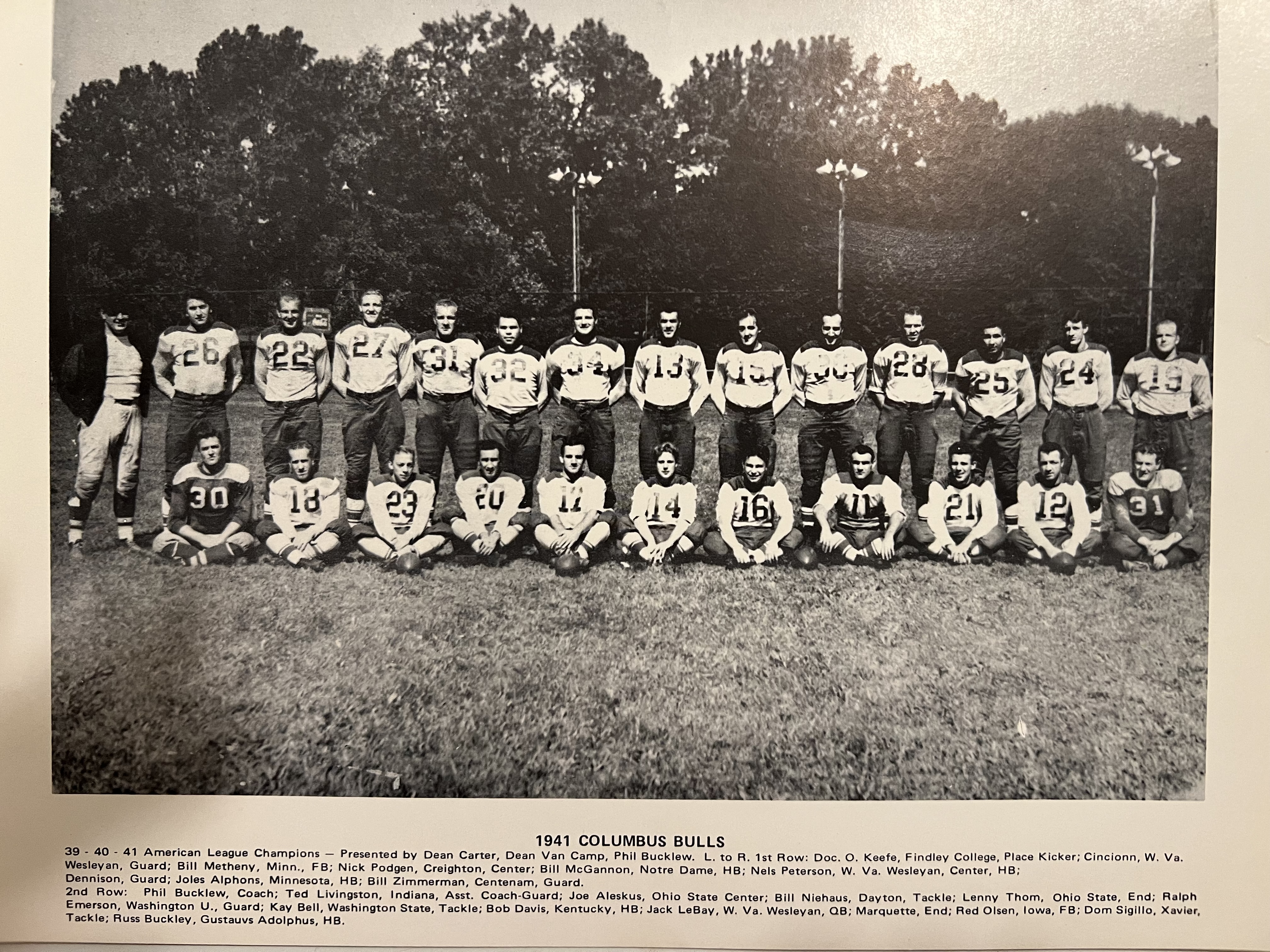

Phil Hinkle Bucklew (December 18, 1914 – December 30, 1992) was an American professional football player who went on to become a United States Navy officer. He served in one of the Navy's first special warfare units during World War II. While serving in the European theater, he was twice awarded the Navy Cross, the second highest decoration in the United States military.

After World War II, Bucklew completed his Ed.D. at Columbia University and went on to command SEAL Team One. In the early stages of the Vietnam War he authored a report in which he predicted the Vietcong would make use of the intercoastal waterways and rivers as routes for supplies and personnel. Although it was initially dismissed, this report was later used as a source to increase the use of Navy SEALs in direct action missions. In 1969 Bucklew retired as a captain and worked as a consultant for a shipbuilding company in the private sector.

Bucklew died in 1992 after a series of strokes. He is known as the "Father of U.S. Naval Special Warfare" and the Phil Bucklew Naval Special Warfare Center at Naval Amphibious Base Coronado bears his name.

== Early life ==
Bucklew was born and raised in Columbus, Ohio, where he attended Columbus North High School. He went on to attend Xavier University in Cincinnati, where he earned fame as a football player (fullback, punter, and tight end). After college, Bucklew played for the Cleveland Rams in 1937 and 1938. In 1939, Bucklew left the Rams and coached the Columbus Bullies for two years, until the United States entered World War II in 1941.

== Naval career ==
=== World War II ===
Bucklew had served in the Naval Reserve from 1930 until 1934, and once again volunteered for military service on December 8, 1941, the day after the Japanese attack on Pearl Harbor. He reported to Norfolk, Virginia, for his training and was commissioned as an ensign upon graduating. He soon joined the Navy Scouts and Raiders, an elite force of combat swimmers who scouted beaches for amphibious landings. As an Ensign, he served with the Scouts and Raiders in Operation Torch (the invasion of North Africa) in November 1942. In July 1943, he commanded a "Scout Boat" during the landings on Sicily (Operation Husky) and was awarded his first Navy Cross. Bucklew participated in the landings at Salerno, Italy (Operation Avalanche), where he was awarded the Silver Star.

Bucklew and his unit were transferred to England to support the imminent invasion of Normandy. In January 1944, Bucklew and another S&R officer, Grant Andreasen, swam ashore at night to collect sand samples from the target beach, which would be later referred to as Omaha Beach. The mission planners needed to know whether the sand would support heavy vehicles. On another occasion, Bucklew and Andreasen were brought within 300 yards of the beach by a kayak paddled by a British Commando. They swam the rest of the way and hid in the water to watch and time sentry patrols, before going ashore to collect more sand samples and other useful intelligence.

On D-Day, June 6, 1944, Bucklew commanded a scout boat, assigned to lead the first wave of tank-carrying landing craft to Omaha Beach. The landing craft were accompanied by DD tanks. While he was still out at sea, Bucklew saw that the sea conditions were too dangerous for launching the DD tanks. Unfortunately, his radio report was ignored and most of the DD tanks foundered. Bucklew was awarded a second Navy Cross while leading the first wave of tank-carrying landing craft to the beach in his scout boat. On that occasion he had to combat both heavy surf and enemy fire. He remained on station as a guide boat all day, directing assault waves and giving supporting fire against German positions. He rescued many soldiers, whose landing craft were destroyed, from drowning. Bucklew laid down in the bow of his boat and pulled the drowning men from the water using the strength of his arms.

Bucklew's final assignment during World War II took him to China, where he scouted the Chinese coast and later moved inland to help train and equip Chinese guerrillas to fight the Japanese. Bucklew moved from one partisan group to another, gathering intelligence on the Japanese along the way. Due to his large size and inability to speak Chinese, the partisans disguised him as a deaf mute. The Japanese learned of this "American Spy" and labeled him "Big Stoop". When his mission was complete he was debriefed in Calcutta, India.

Three of his closest friends in the Scouts also had athletic backgrounds: John Tripson, formerly a Detroit Lions all-pro tackle, Robert Halperin, who had played quarterback for Knute Rockne's Notre Dame football team and in the NFL, and Jerry Donnell, a football player who was killed in action at the Battle of Anzio.

=== Post World War II ===
In 1946, Bucklew married his fiancée, Helen Nagel, and left active duty for two years to complete his Ed.D. in education at Columbia University. At Columbia, Bucklew worked as a Navy ROTC instructor and coached the football team. He returned to active duty in 1948 before completing his Ph.D., serving at various bases in the United States, Korea, and Vietnam. In June 1951, LCDR Bucklew was assigned as commanding officer of Beach Jumper Unit 2, at the Naval Amphibious Base, Little Creek, Virginia and served in that capacity until late 1955. In 1952 the U.S. Navy turned its PT boats over to the South Korean Navy. These boats flew under the Korean flag but were manned by American sailors under the command of Bucklew. In 1955, then-Lieutenant Commander Bucklew was assigned to a Naval Advisory Group in Korea, operating from a base off Inchon. This group, with the help of the CIA, conducted infiltration, harassment, and psychological operations against North Korea.

In 1962, after 20 years of service, Bucklew was facing mandatory retirement due to staff reductions within the Navy. However, with the creation of the SEAL Teams under President John F. Kennedy, Bucklew was selected to command Naval Special Warfare Group One, which consisted of SEAL Team 1, Underwater Demolition Teams 11 and 12, and BSU-1 (Boat Support Unit). Bucklew never qualified at BUD/S himself.

=== Vietnam ===
In early 1964, before American forces became actively engaged in South Vietnam, Captain Bucklew, at the behest of CINCPAC Admiral Harry D. Felt, took part in an exploratory mission to determine what could be done to counter waterborne infiltration of South Vietnam. Bucklew and his staff traveled the Mekong Delta, interviewing dozens of Vietnamese military personnel and their American advisors. At the Cambodian border, Bucklew witnessed the Vietcong openly moving supplies by sampan inside Cambodia, despite its neutrality. In his report to CINCPAC, Bucklew described the totality of the Communist infiltration effort, criticized the South Vietnamese response as inefficient and inadequate, and suggested that halting the Vietcong would require a coastal blockade augmented by extensive patrolling of the internal rivers along the Cambodian frontier, in addition to the Mekong and Bassac. The "Bucklew Report" further recommended that the Navy establish "a viable means of controlling the rivers by implementing barricades, curfews, checkpoints, and patrols."

The Navy initially disregarded Bucklew's conclusion, placing emphasis on seaborne infiltration of South Vietnam by the North Vietnamese and the Vietcong. After the Navy launched Operation Market Time, it refused to consider the implications of the Bucklew report. Ironically the effectiveness of Market Time caused the North Vietnamese and Vietcong to do what Bucklew predicted in greater force: make use of the rivers along the Cambodian frontier to move logistics into a region where countermeasures were nonexistent. Hence, the Vietcong was able to conclude the build-up necessary to launch the attacks of early 1968. Bucklew's report was, however, used as the impetus to deploy SEAL Teams for direct action missions in 1966.

After relinquishing command of NSWG1 in 1967, Bucklew was assigned to the Department of the Navy at the Pentagon, where he served until his retirement in 1969.

== Post-military life and legacy ==
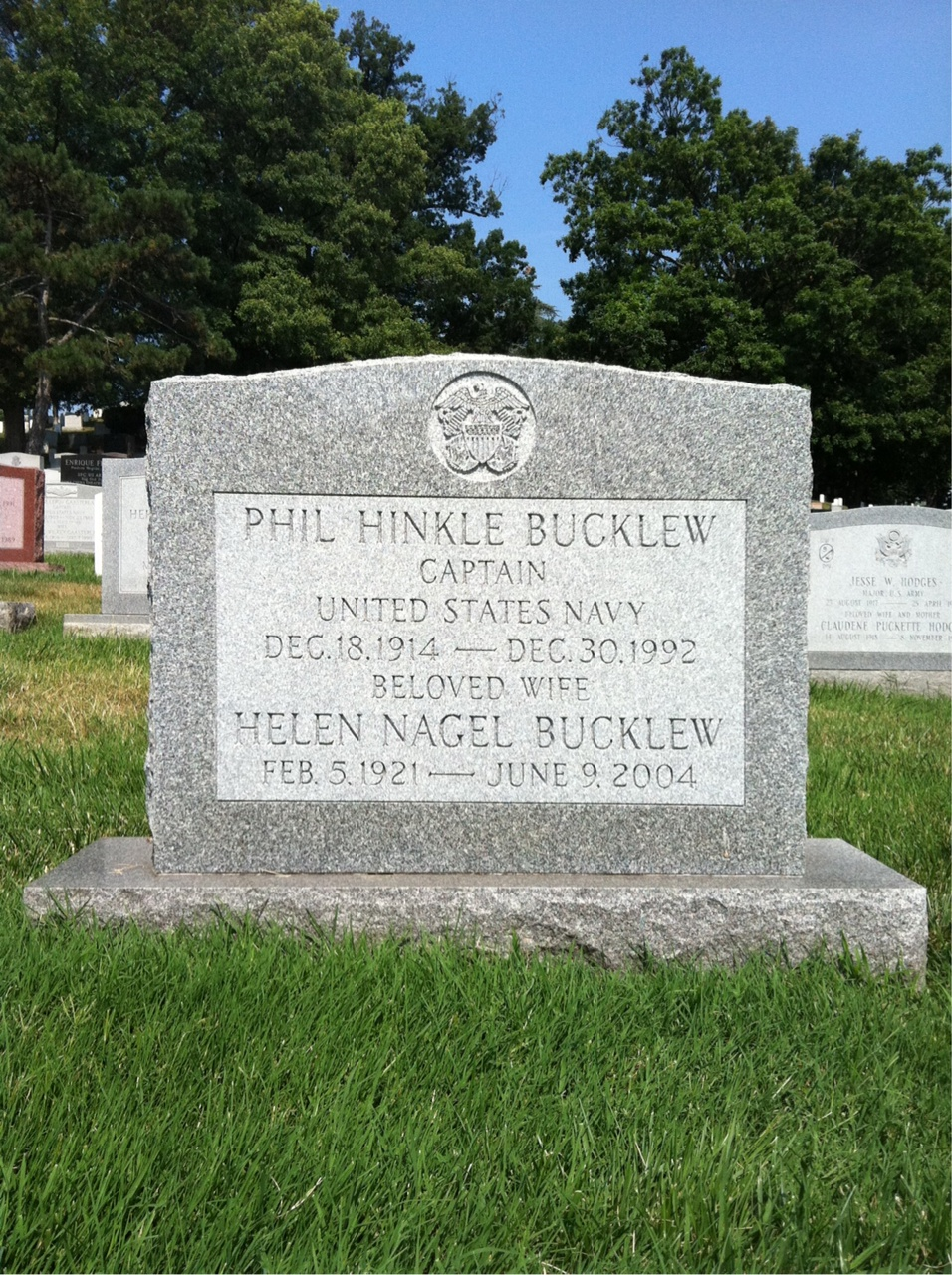
Grave at Arlington National Cemetery

After retirement, Bucklew remained in the D.C. area. From 1974 to 1984, he served as the D.C. representative for Swiftships, a Louisiana boatbuilding company.

Bucklew is often called "The Father of Naval Special Warfare" by members of the Naval Special Warfare community and military authors. His written memoirs were published in 1982. In 1987, using a wheelchair after a stroke, Bucklew attended the ceremony in which the Naval Special Warfare Center in Coronado, California, was named for him. In October 1989, he was inducted as the 34th member of the Columbus Hall of Fame, and his photograph hangs in City Hall. Bucklew died at Fairfax Hospital in Fairfax, Virginia, in 1992 after suffering more strokes. He is buried at Arlington National Cemetery with his wife Helen Nagel (1921–2004).

== Navy Cross citations ==
=== First Navy Cross citation ===
Citation:

The President of the United States of America takes pleasure in presenting the Navy Cross to Lieutenant, Junior Grade [then Ensign] Phil Hinkle Bucklew, United States Naval (Reserve), for extraordinary heroism and distinguished service in the line of his profession as a Scout Boat Officer in action against enemy forces during the amphibious assault on the Island of Sicily on July 10, 1943. Achieving a high degree of success in his capable and resourceful training of scout boat crews for the entire attack force, Lieutenant, Junior Grade, Bucklew participated in the actual invasion with outstanding courage. Undeterred by glaring searchlight illumination and withering blasts of hostile weapons, he proceeded through hazardous waters, located the designated beach and directed the assault boat wave. Utterly disregarding shore battery and machine-gun fire which repeatedly struck his vessel, Lieutenant, Junior Grade, Bucklew persevered in guiding subsequent waves to the proper beach. The conduct of Lieutenant, Junior Grade, Bucklew throughout this action reflects great credit upon himself, and was in keeping with the highest traditions of the United States Naval Service.

=== Second Navy Cross citation ===
Citation:

The President of the United States of America takes pleasure in presenting a Gold Star in lieu of a Second Award of the Navy Cross to Lieutenant, Junior Grade Phil Hinkle Bucklew, United States Naval (Reserve), for extraordinary heroism and distinguished service in the line of his profession as Officer in Charge of an LCT Scout Boat during the amphibious assault on the Normandy Coast of France on June 6, 1944. Embarked in one of the first craft to approach the strongly defended cost, Lieutenant, Junior Grade, Bucklew successfully accomplished his highly important mission of locating the designated beaches and, despite rough surf and continuous harassing enemy fire, skillfully led the first wave of DD tanks, going in close to the beach and taking his station as guide. Firing his boat's rockets over the tanks at target objectives in support of the landings, he moved in closer to direct his guns at suspected hostile machine-gun nests in houses along the beach and subsequently, in the face of heavy enemy opposition, rescued wounded personnel from burning landing craft and regulated the flow of traffic throughout the morning and afternoon of D-Day. The conduct of Lieutenant, Junior Grade, Bucklew throughout this action reflects great credit upon himself, and was in keeping with the highest traditions of the United States Naval Service.

== Military awards and decorations ==
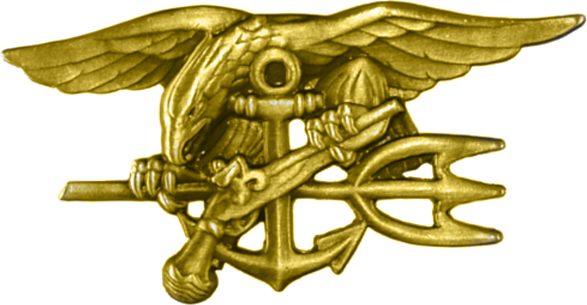

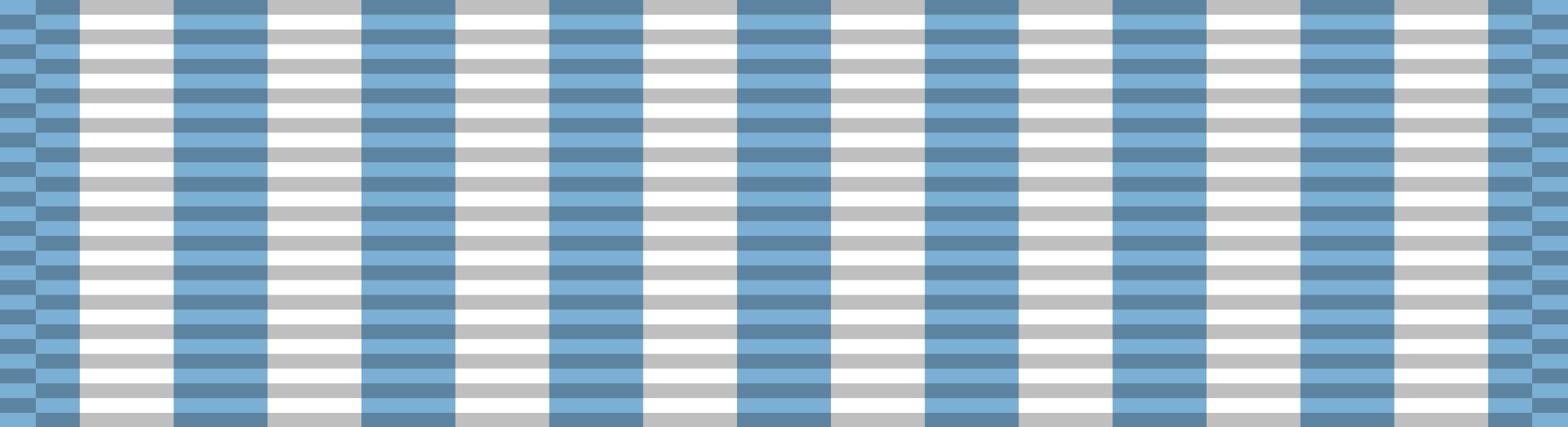

Badge	Special Warfare Insignia			
1st Row	Navy Cross w/ one 5/16 inch star			
2nd Row	Silver Star	Bronze Star Medal	Meritorious Service Medal	Navy and Marine Corps Achievement Medal
3rd Row	Presidential Unit Citation	Navy Meritorious Unit Commendation	Navy Good Conduct Medal	China Service Medal
4th Row	American Defense Medal	American Campaign Medal	Asiatic Pacific Campaign Medal	World War II Victory Medal
5th Row	Navy Occupation Service Medal	National Defense Service Medal w/ one bronze 3/16 Service star	Armed Forces Expeditionary Medal	Vietnam Service Medal
6th Row	Croix de Guerre with palm	Korean Presidential Unit Citation	United Nations Korean Medal	Vietnam Campaign Medal

== Head coaching record ==
Year	Team	Overall	Conference	Standing	Bowl/playoffs
Xavier Musketeers (Independent) (1946)
1946	Xavier	3–7			
Xavier:		3–7			
Total:		3–7			
