= 1946 Northern Illinois State Huskies football team =

American college football season

1946 Northern Illinois State Huskies football

IIAC champion

Turkey Bowl, L 7–19 vs. Evansville
- Conference: Illinois Intercollegiate Athletic Conference
- Record: 9–2 (4–0 IIAC)
- Head coach: Chick Evans (18th season)
- Captain: Robert Duffield
- Home stadium: Glidden Field

1946 Illinois Intercollegiate Athletic Conference football standings
	Conf.					Overall
Team	W		L		T	W		L		T
Northern Illinois State $	4	–	0	–	0	9	–	2	–	0
Southern Illinois	3	–	1	–	0	4	–	4	–	0
Illinois State Normal	2	–	2	–	0	6	–	3	–	0
Eastern Illinois	1	–	3	–	0	2	–	6	–	0
Western Illinois	0	–	4	–	0	2	–	6	–	0
$ – Conference champion

The 1946 Northern Illinois State Huskies football team represented Northern Illinois State Teachers College—now known as Northern Illinois University—as a member of the Illinois Intercollegiate Athletic Conference (IIAC) during the 1946 college football season. Led by 18th-year head coach Chick Evans, the Huskies compiled an overall record of 9–2 with a mark of 4–0 in conference play, winning the IIAC title. Northern Illinois State was invited to the Turkey Bowl, where they lost to Evansville. The team played home games at the 5,500-seat Glidden Field, located on the east end of campus, in DeKalb, Illinois.

== Schedule ==
Date	Opponent	Site	Result	Source
September 21	Aurora Clippers*	Glidden Field; DeKalb, IL	W 20–0	
September 28	at Elmhurst*	Elmhurst, IL	W 49–6	
October 4	Eastern Illinois	Glidden Field; DeKalb, IL	W 26–0	
October 12	Wheaton (IL)*	Glidden Field; DeKalb, IL	W 20–0	
October 18	Illinois Wesleyan*	Glidden Field; DeKalb, IL	W 20–0	
October 26	at Central Michigan*	Alumni Field; Mount Pleasant, MI	L 7–58	
November 2	at Western Illinois	Macomb, IL	W 14–13	
November 9	Illinois State Normal	Glidden Field; DeKalb, IL	W 14–3	
November 16	at Southern Illinois	McAndrew Stadium; Carbondale, IL	W 10–0	
November 23	at Millikin*	Decatur, IL	W 20–0	
November 28	at Evansville*	Evansville, IN (Turkey Bowl)	L 7–19	
*Non-conference game
