= Midlands Conference =

US intercollegiate athletic conference

The Midlands Conference was an intercollegiate athletic conference that existed from 1947 to 1953. Its members were located in the states of Illinois, Indiana, Iowa, Kansas, and Wisconsin. The conference was formed in 1947 and opened for the 1947–48 basketball season with five member schools: Loras College of Dubuque, Iowa, St. Ambrose College—now known as St. Ambrose University—of Davenport, Iowa, St. Benedict's College—now known as Benedictine College—of Atchison, Kansas, Saint Joseph's College of Rensselaer, Indiana, and St. Norbert College of De Pere, Wisconsin. Lewis University of Romeoville, Illinois joined the conference in 1950.

== Football champions ==
- 1948 – Loras and St. Ambrose
- 1949 – St. Ambrose
- 1950 – St. Norbert
- 1951 – Lewis
- 1952 – St. Norbert

== Football standings ==
1948 Midlands Conference football standings
	Conf.					Overall
Team	W		L		T	W		L		T
Loras +	2	–	1	–	0	7	–	1	–	0
St. Ambrose +	2	–	1	–	0	7	–	3	–	0
St. Norbert	1	–	2	–	0	4	–	5	–	0
Saint Joseph's (IN)	1	–	2	–	0	3	–	5	–	0
+ – Conference co-champions

1949 Midlands Conference football standings
	Conf.					Overall
Team	W		L		T	W		L		T
St. Ambrose $	3	–	0	–	0	8	–	0	–	0
St. Norbert	2	–	1	–	0	4	–	4	–	0
Saint Joseph's (IN)	1	–	2	–	0	5	–	4	–	0
Loras	0	–	3	–	0	3	–	5	–	0
$ – Conference champion

1950 Midlands Conference football standings
	Conf.					Overall
Team	W		L		T	W		L		T
St. Norbert $	4	–	0	–	0	7	–	0	–	0
St. Ambrose	3	–	1	–	0	12	–	1	–	0
Loras	1	–	2	–	0	8	–	3	–	0
Lewis	1	–	2	–	0	4	–	4	–	0
Saint Joseph's (IN)	0	–	4	–	0	1	–	6	–	1
$ – Conference champion

1951 Midlands Conference football standings
	Conf.					Overall
Team	W		L		T	W		L		T
Lewis $	3	–	0	–	0	7	–	1	–	0
St. Ambrose	2	–	1	–	0	9	–	2	–	0
St. Norbert	2	–	2	–	0	5	–	4	–	0
Loras	1	–	3	–	0	6	–	4	–	0
Saint Joseph's (IN)	1	–	3	–	0	4	–	4	–	0
$ – Conference champion

1952 Midlands Conference football standings
	Conf.					Overall
Team	W		L		T	W		L		T
St. Norbert $	4	–	0	–	0	6	–	0	–	0
Loras	3	–	1	–	0	8	–	1	–	0
St. Ambrose	2	–	2	–	0	4	–	5	–	0
Lewis	0	–	3	–	1	2	–	5	–	1
Saint Joseph's (IN)	0	–	3	–	1	0	–	8	–	1
$ – Conference champion

== See also ==
- List of defunct college football conferences
