= 1946 Ohio Bobcats football team =

American college football season

1946 Ohio Bobcats football
- Conference: Mid-American Conference
- Record: 6–3 (0–1 MAC)
- Head coach: Don Peden (21st season)
- Home stadium: Peden Stadium

1946 Mid-America Conference football standings
	Conf.					Overall
Team	W		L		T	W		L		T
Cincinnati $	2	–	0	–	0	9	–	2	–	0
Western Reserve	1	–	1	–	0	4	–	3	–	2
Ohio	0	–	1	–	0	6	–	3	–	0
Wayne	0	–	1	–	0	4	–	5	–	0
$ – Conference champion

The 1946 Ohio Bobcats football team was an American football team that represented Ohio University in the Mid-America Conference (MAC) during the 1946 college football season. In their 21st and final season under head coach Don Peden, the Bobcats compiled a 6–3 record and were outscored by a total of 206 to 97. In February 1947, head coach Don Peden announced his retirement as the school's football coach, though he continued to serve as the school's athletic director and baseball coach.

Ohio was ranked at No. 73 in the final Litkenhous Difference by Score System rankings for 1946.

== Schedule ==
Date	Opponent	Site	Result	Attendance	Source
September 28	Murray State*	Peden Stadium; Athens, OH	W 27–7	7,000	
October 5	at Western Michigan*	Waldo Stadium; Kalamazoo, MI	W 25–7		
October 12	Muskingum*	Peden Stadium; Athens, OH	W 38–0		
October 19	at Cincinnati	Nippert Stadium; Cincinnati, OH	L 0–19	25,000	
October 26	Miami (OH)*	Peden Stadium; Athens, OH (rivalry)	L 14–23	12,336	
November 2	at Ohio Wesleyan*	Selby Field; Delaware, OH	W 49–7	9,000	
November 9	Baldwin-Wallace*	Peden Stadium; Athens, OH	W 21–14		
November 16	Dayton*	Peden Stadium; Athens, OH	L 7–14	6,000	
November 23	at Xavier*	Cincinnati, OH	W 25–6	3,000	
*Non-conference game
