= 1946 College Conference of Illinois football season =

- Sport: Football
- Number of teams: 9
- Champion: North Central

Football seasons
- ← 1945 1947 →

1946 College Conference of Illinois football standings
	Conf.					Overall
Team	W		L		T	W		L		T
North Central (IL) $	7	–	1	–	0	7	–	1	–	0
Illinois Wesleyan	3	–	1	–	0	3	–	5	–	0
Wheaton (IL)	3	–	1	–	0	6	–	2	–	0
Lake Forest	3	–	1	–	0	3	–	3	–	0
Augustana (IL)	2	–	2	–	0	3	–	5	–	0
Millikin	1	–	3	–	0	2	–	6	–	0
Illinois College	1	–	4	–	0	2	–	5	–	1
Elmhurst	1	–	4	–	0	2	–	6	–	0
Carthage	0	–	4	–	0	0	–	7	–	1
$ – Conference champion

The 1946 College Conference of Illinois football season was the season of college football played by the member schools of the College Conference of Illinois (CCI) as part of the 1946 college football season. The CCI was formed in May 1946 and was a reorganization of the "Illinois College Conference" that had existed for the prior nine years.

The North Central Cardinals, in their first year under head coach Herb Heilman, won the CCI championship with a 7–1 record. Three teams tied for second place: the Wheaton Crusaders; Illinois Wesleyan Titans; and Lake Forest Foresters.

== Conference overview ==
Conf. rank	Team	Head coach	Conf. record	Overall record	Points scored	Points against
1	North Central (IL)	Herb Heilman	7–1	7–1	148	22
2 (tie)	Wheaton (IL)	Harvey Chrouser	3–1	6–2	146	33
2 (tie)	Illinois Wesleyan	Melvin Clay	3-1	3-5	56	111
2 (tie)	Lake Forest	Ralph Jones	3–1	3–3	50	104
5	Augustana (IL)	John L. Briley	2–2	3–5	65	89
6	James Millikin	Marshall Wells	1–3	2–6	53	93
7 (tie)	Illinois College	Albert Miller	1–4	2–5–1	60	133
7 (tie)	Elmhurst	O.M. Langhorst	1–4	2–6	88	162
9	Carthage	Paul LaVinn	0–4	0–7–1	14	178

== Team overviews ==
=== North Central ===
1946 North Central Cardinals football

CCI champion
- Conference: College Conference of Illinois
- Record: 7–1 (7–1 CCI)
- Head coach: Herb Heilman

The 1946 North Central Cardinals football team represented North Central College of Naperville, Illinois, during the 1946 college football season. In their first season under head coach Herb Heilman, the Cardinals compiled a 7–1 record, won the CCI championship, and outscored opponents by a total of 148 to 22. The Cardinals' sole loss was by a 10-7 score against Lake Forest. It was North Central's first conference championship in 29 years.

Date	Opponent	Site	Result	Attendance	Source
September 28	Illinois Wesleyan	Naperville, IL	W 17–0		
October 5	at James Millikin	Decatur, IL	W 7–6	3,000	
October 12	Illinois College	Naperville, IL	W 39–0		
October 19	at Lake Forest	Farwell Field; Lake Forest, IL	L 7–10		
October 26	at Carthage	Carthage, IL	W 40–0		
November 2	at Wheaton	Lauson Field; Wheaton, IL	W 7–0	2,500	
November 9	Augustana	Naperville, IL	W 18–0	3,500	
November 16	at Elmhurt	Elmhurst, IL	W 13–6		

=== Wheaton ===
1946 Wheaton Crusaders football
- Conference: College Conference of Illinois
- Record: 6–2 (3–1 CCI)
- Head coach: Harvey Chrouser (3rd season)

The 1946 Wheaton Crusaders football team represented Wheaton College of Wheaton, Illinois, in the College Conference of Illinois during the 1946 college football season. In their third non-consecutive year under head coach Harvey Chrouser, the Crusaders compiled a 6–2 record (3–1 against CCI opponents), tied for second place in the CCI, and outscored opponent by a total of 146 to 33.

Date	Opponent	Site	Result	Attendance	Source
September 28	Concordia*		W 31–6		
October 5	Western Illinois*	Wheaton, IL	W 6–0		
October 12	at Northern Illinois*	DeKalb, IL	L 0–20		
October 19	Elmhurst	Wheaton, IL	W 27–0	3,000	
October 26	Lake Forest	Wheaton, IL	W 31–0		
November 2	North Central	Lauson Field; Wheaton, IL	L 0–7		
November 9	Loras*		W 26–0		
November 16	at Carthage	Carthage, IL	W 25–0		
*Non-conference game

=== Illinois Wesleyan ===
1946 Illinois Wesleyan Titans football
- Conference: College Conference of Illinois
- Record: 3–5 (3–1 CCI)
- Head coach: Melvin Clay
- Home stadium: Memorial Stadium

Date	Opponent	Site	Result	Source
September 28	at North Central	Naperville, IL	L 0–17	
October 5	Evansville*	Memorial Stadium; Bloomington, IL	L 6–20	
October 12	James Millikin	Bloomington, IL	W 12–7	
October 18	at Northern Illinois*	Glidden Field; DeKalb, IL	L 0–20	
October 26	Augustana^{†}	Bloomington, IL	W 25–13	
November 2	at Arkansas State*	Kays Stadium; Jonesboro, AR	L 0–20	
November 9	at Illinois College	Jacksoville, IL	W 13–7	
November 16	Illinois State Normal	Bloomington, IL	L 0–7	
*Non-conference game; ^{†}Homecoming

=== Lake Forest ===
1946 Lake Forest Foresters football
- Conference: College Conference of Illinois
- Record: 3–3 (3–1 CCI)
- Head coach: Ralph Jones (11th season)

Date	Opponent	Site	Result	Attendance	Source
October 12	Elmhurst	Lake Forest, IL	W 20–12		
October 19	North Central	Farwell Field; Lake Forest, IL	W 10–7		
October 26	at Wheaton	Wheaton, IL	L 0–31		
November 2	Carroll*^{†}	Lake Forest, IL	L 0–34	2,500	
November 9	Wabash*	Crawfordsville, IN	L 0–20		
November 16	James Millikin	Lake Forest, IL	W 20-0		
*Non-conference game; ^{†}Homecoming

=== Augustana ===
1946 Augustana (Illinois) Vikings football
- Conference: College Conference of Illinois
- Record: 3–5 (2–2 CCI)
- Head coach: John Briley (3rd season)

Date	Opponent	Site	Result	Attendance	Source
September 28	Coe*	Rock Island, IL	L 6–7		
October 5	Carthage	Rock Island, IL	W 13–0		
October 12	St. Ambrose*	Rock Island High School; Rock Island, IL	L 0–19	3,500	
October 19	at Knox*	Galesburg, IL	L 0–7		
October 26	at Illinois Wesleyan	Bloomington, IL	L 13–25		
November 2	at Monmouth*	Monmouth, IL	W 20–13		
November 9	at North Central	Naperville, IL	L 0–18		
November 16	Illinois College^{†}	Rock Island, IL	W 13–0		
*Non-conference game; ^{†}Homecoming

=== Millikin ===
1946 Millikin Big Blue football
- Conference: College Conference of Illinois
- Record: 2–6 (1–3 CCI)
- Head coach: Marshall Wells (3rd season)

Date	Opponent	Site	Result	Attendance	Source
October 5	North Central	Decatur, IL	L 6–7	3,000	
October 12	at Illinois Wesleyan	Bloomington, IL	L 7–12		
October 19	at Eastern Illinois	Charleston, IL	L 0–7		
October 26	Illinois College^{†}		W 27–0	3,500	
November 2	Illinois State Normal	McCormick Field; Normal, IL	L 0–20		
November 9	Western Illinois		W 13–7		
November 16	at Lake Forest	Lake Forest, IL	L 0–20		
November 23	Northern Illinois	Decatur, IL	L 0–20		
^{†}Homecoming

=== Illinois College ===
1946 Illinois College Blueboys football
- Conference: College Conference of Illinois
- Record: 2–5–1 (1–4 CCI)
- Head coach: Albert Miller

Date	Opponent	Site	Result	Attendance	Source
September 29	Western Illinois*		L 6–21		
October 4	Quincy*	Jacksonville, IL	W 21–14		
October 12	at North Central	Naperville, IL	L 0–39		
October 19	Shurtleff	Jackonville, IL	T 0–0		
October 26	at James Millikin	Decatur, IL	L 0–27		
November 2	Elmhurst	Jacksonville, IL	W 26–6		
November 9	Illinois Wesleyan^{†}	Jackonville, IL	L 7–13		
November 16	at Augustana	Rock Island, IL	L 0–13		
*Non-conference game; ^{†}Homecoming

=== Elmhurst ===
1946 Elmhurst Bluejays football
- Conference: College Conference of Illinois
- Record: 2–6 (1–4 CCI)
- Head coach: O.M. Langhorst

Date	Opponent	Site	Result	Attendance	Source
September 28	Northern Illinois	Elmhurst, IL	L 6–49		
October 5	at Concordia	River Forest, IL	L 13–27		
October 12	at Lake Forest	Lake Forest, IL	L 12–20		
October 19	at Wheaton	Wheaton, IL	L 0–27		
October 26	Concordia	Elmhurst, IL	W 18–0		
November 2	at Illinois College	Jacksonville, IL	L 6–26		
November 9	Carthage	Elmhurst, IL	W 27–0		
November 16	North Central	Elmhurst, IL	L 6–13		

=== Carthage ===
1946 Carthage Red Men football
- Conference: College Conference of Illinois
- Record: 0–7–1 (0–4 CCI)
- Head coach: Paul LaVinn (2nd season)

Date	Opponent	Site	Result	Attendance	Source
September 28	at Wartburg*	Waverly, IA	L 7–32		
October 5	at Augustana	Rock Island, IL	L 0–13		
October 12	Eureka	Carthage, IL	T 7–7		
October 19	at Monmouth*	Monmouth, IL	L 0–28		
October 26	North Central	Carthage, IL	L 0–40		
November 2	Culver-Stockton		L 0–6		
November 9	at Elmhurst	Elmhurst, IL	L 0–27		
November 16	Wheaton	Carthage, IL	L 0–25		
*Non-conference game
