= Robert L. Nipper =

American football player and coach (1903–1993)

Biographical details
- Born: February 15, 1903; Fort Wayne, Indiana, U.S.
- Died: October 16, 1993 (aged 90)

Playing career

Football
- 1922–1925: Butler

Basketball
- 1922–1926: Butler

Baseball
- 1923–1926: Butler

Coaching career (HC unless noted)

Football
- 1927–1930: Butler (assistant)
- 1931–1942: Shortridge HS (IN)
- 1946: DePauw

Head coaching record
- Overall: 1–5–2 (college)

Robert L. Nipper (February 15, 1903 – October 16, 1993) was an American college football player and coach. He served as the head football coach at DePauw University in 1946, compiling a record of 1–5–2. Nipper died on October 16, 1993.

== Head coaching record ==
=== College ===
Year	Team	Overall	Conference	Standing	Bowl/playoffs
DePauw Tigers (Indiana Intercollegiate Conference) (1946)
1946	DePauw	1–5–2	1–2	T–11th	
DePauw:		1–5–2	1–2		
Total:		1–5–2			
