= Roy Tillotson =

American football coach (1891–1962)

Biographical details
- Born: April 1, 1891; Oberlin, Ohio, U.S.
- Died: August 30, 1962 (aged 71); East Chicago, Indiana, U.S.

Playing career

Football
- 1912–1914: Oberlin
- Position: Tackle

Coaching career (HC unless noted)

Football
- 1916–1919: Allegheny HS (PA)
- 1920–1923: Hiram
- 1924–1929: Miami (OH) (assistant)
- 1930–1948: Franklin (IN)

Basketball
- 1920–1924: Hiram
- 1924–1930: Miami (OH)
- 1932–1947: Franklin (IN)

Baseball
- 1921–1924: Hiram
- ?–1949: Franklin (IN)

Administrative career (AD unless noted)
- ?–1949: Franklin (IN)

Head coaching record
- Overall: 53–110–10 (college football); 185–215 (college basketball); 12–25–1 (college baseball, Hiram only)

Roy Everett Tillotson (April 1, 1891 – August 30, 1962) was an American coach and athletic trainer who coached at Hiram College in Hiram, Ohio, Miami University in Oxford, Ohio, Franklin College in Franklin, Indiana, and the University of Toledo.

Tillotson was born in Oberlin, Ohio, where he graduated from Oberlin High School in 1910 and Oberlin College in 1916. He later earned an M.S. degree at Indiana University Bloomington in 1938. He also attended University of Illinois, University of Notre Dame and Columbia University.

After teaching physical education and coaching at Allegheny High School in Pittsburgh for four years, he became a coach at Hiram College in 1920. He was head basketball coach at Miami University from 1924 until 1930, when he began a 19-year career at Franklin College. He became equipment manager and trainer at the University of Toledo in 1950, retiring the year before his death.

Tillotson died on August 30, 1962, at St. Catherine Hospital in East Chicago, Indiana, after suffering a heart attack. He and is buried alongside his wife, Mabelle, at Greenlawn Cemetery in Franklin, Indiana.

== Head coaching record ==
=== College football ===
Year	Team	Overall	Conference	Standing	Bowl/playoffs
Hiram Terriers (Ohio Athletic Conference) (1920–1923)
1920	Hiram	0–9	0–6	17th	
1921	Hiram	2–4–2	1–4–2	15th	
1922	Hiram	2–7	1–6	T–18th	
1923	Hiram	5–2	5–2	T–4th	
Hiram:		9–22–2	7–18–2		
Franklin Grizzlies (Indiana Intercollegiate Conference) (1930–1946)
1930	Franklin	3–4–1			
1931	Franklin	7–1			
1932	Franklin	4–3–1			
1933	Franklin	2–5–1	2–4–1	T–9th	
1934	Franklin	3–5	3–5	9th	
1935	Franklin	1–7	1–7	14th	
1936	Franklin	3–5	3–4	9th	
1937	Franklin	3–4–1	3–3–1	9th	
1938	Franklin	2–6	2–5	10th	
1939	Franklin	1–7	1–7	12th	
1940	Franklin	0–8	0–7	14th	
1941	Franklin	2–5–1	2–4–1	10th	
1942	Franklin	1–7	1–5	12th	
1943	Franklin	0–2			
1944	Franklin	1–3–1			
1945	Franklin	0–5	0–5	10th	
1946	Franklin	4–4	3–3	T–7th	
Franklin Grizzlies (Hoosier Conference) (1947–1948)
1947	Franklin	6–2	5–1	T–2nd	
1948	Franklin	1–5–2	1–4–2	7th	
Franklin:		44–88–8			
Total:		53–110–10			
