= St. Norbert Green Knights football =

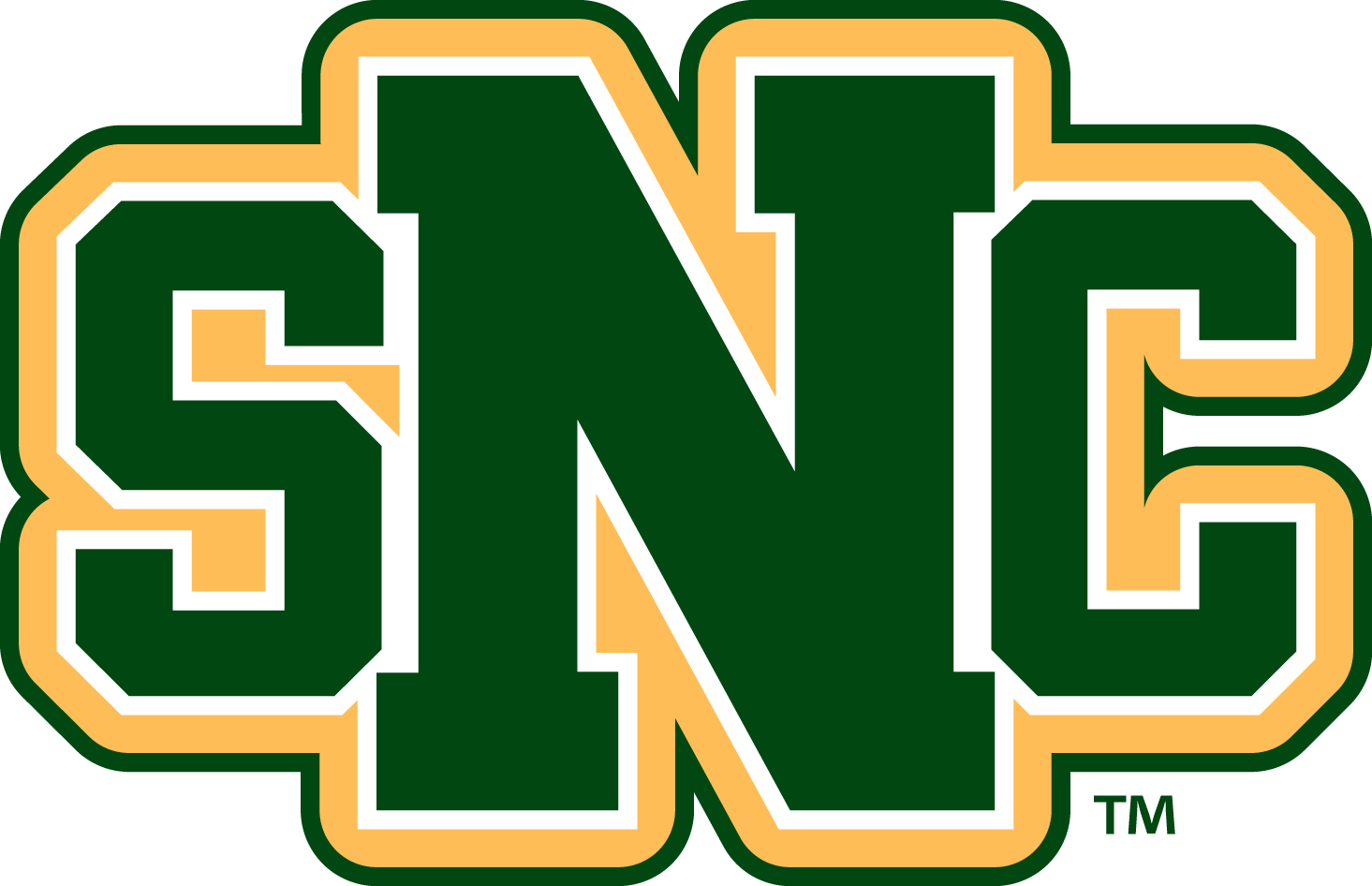
- First season: 1931; 95 years ago
- Athletic director: Cam Fuller
- Head coach: Dan McCarty; 10th season, 72–32 (.692)
- Location: De Pere, Wisconsin
- Stadium: Schneider Stadium (capacity: 2,454)
- NCAA division: Division III
- Conference: NACC
- Colors: Green and gold

College Football Playoff appearances
- NCAA Div. III: 13 (1989, 1999, 2000, 2001, 2003, 2004, 2006, 2007, 2010, 2012, 2013, 2015, 2018)

Conference championships
- Midlands Conference: 2 (1950, 1952) Midwest Conference: 17 (1985, 1987, 1988, 1989, 1999, 2000, 2001, 2002, 2003, 2004, 2006, 2007, 2010, 2012, 2013, 2015, 2018)
- Website: athletics.snc.edu

The St. Norbert Green Knights football program is the intercollegiate American football team for St. Norbert College, located in the U.S. state of Wisconsin. The team competes in the NCAA Division III and is a member of the Northern Athletics Collegiate Conference (NACC). St. Norbert's first football team was fielded in 1931. The team plays its home games at the 2,454-seat Schneider Stadium in De Pere, Wisconsin.

The Green Knights have been coached by Dan McCarty since 2015. He was the defensive coordinator until the previous Green Knights coach elected to resign from his position. McCarty previously coached the defense at the University of Wisconsin–Stout.

== Coaching history ==
St. Norbert has had 11 head coaches in their history. No teams were fielded in 1943, 1944, or 1945 due to World War II. Additionally, no team was fielded in 2020 due to the COVID-19 pandemic.

Coach	Seasons	Term	Wins	Losses	Ties	Win %
Jack Malevich	3	1931–1933	4	9	3	.344
Mickey McCormick	9	1934–1942	32	26	8	.545
Tom Hearden	7	1946–1952	40	14	0	.741
Mel Nicks	7	1953–1959	28	26	3	.518
Howard Kolstad	19	1960–1978	96	76	5	.556
Larry Van Alstine	4	1979–1982	10	28	0	.263
Don LaViolette	11	1983–1993	59	43	1	.578
Greg Quick	5	1994–1998	21	25	0	.457
Jim Purtill	15	1999–2013	130	30	0	.813
Steve Opgenorth	1	2014	6	4	0	.600
Dan McCarty	9	2015–present	72	32	0	.692

== Conference affiliation ==
- Independent (1931–1946)
- Midlands Conference (1947–1953)
- Independent (1954–1983)
- Midwest Conference (1984–2020)
- Northern Athletics Collegiate Conference (2021–present)

== Championships ==
=== Conference championships ===
The Green Knights have won 19 conference championships (15 outright, 4 shared), despite being an Independent for 43 seasons. St. Norbert was a member of the Midlands Conference from 1947–1953, winning two championships in that time, which was tied for the most with Loras College before the conference disbanded. During a 36 season stint in the Midwest Conference, the Green Knights won the championship 17 times.

Year	Conference	Coach	Overall Record	Conference Record
1950	Midlands Conference	Tom Hearden	7–0	4–0
1952	Midlands Conference	Tom Hearden	6–0	4–0
1985†	Midwest Conference	Don LaViolette	6–2–1	6–1
1987	Midwest Conference	Don LaViolette	7–3	6–1
1988	Midwest Conference	Don LaViolette	8–2	6–0
1989	Midwest Conference	Don LaViolette	8–3	6–0
1999	Midwest Conference	Jim Purtill	9–2	9–0
2000	Midwest Conference	Jim Purtill	10–1	9–0
2001†	Midwest Conference	Jim Purtill	8–2	7–1
2002†	Midwest Conference	Jim Purtill	9–1	8–1
2003	Midwest Conference	Jim Purtill	11–1	9–0
2004	Midwest Conference	Jim Purtill	9–2	9–0
2006	Midwest Conference	Jim Purtill	10–1	9–0
2007	Midwest Conference	Jim Purtill	10–1	9–0
2010	Midwest Conference	Jim Purtill	7–4	7–2
2012†	Midwest Conference	Jim Purtill	8–3	8–1
2013	Midwest Conference	Jim Purtill	8–3	8–1
2015	Midwest Conference	Dan McCarty	10–1	5–0
2018	Midwest Conference	Dan McCarty	10–2	5–0

† Co-champions

=== Undefeated regular seasons ===
St. Norbert has finished the regular season undefeated nine times. Of the undefeated seasons, four (1946, 1950, 1952, 1957) were before there was a postseason to determine a champion. In the playoff era, the Green Knights finished the regular season undefeated five times (2000, 2003, 2006, 2007, 2015) before ultimately losing a game in the playoffs. In 1946 St. Norbert received votes in the AP Poll to finish the season ranked #29 in all of college football, right behind Northwestern and just ahead of Kentucky.

Year	Coach	Regular season record	Final record
1946	Tom Hearden	8–0	8–0
1950	Tom Hearden	7–0	7–0
1952	Tom Hearden	6–0	6–0
1957	Mel Nicks	8–0	8–0
2000	Jim Purtill	10–0	10–1
2003	Jim Purtill	10–0	11–1
2006	Jim Purtill	10–0	10–1
2007	Jim Purtill	10–0	10–1
2015	Dan McCarty	10–0	10–1

== Postseason games ==
=== NCAA Division III playoffs ===
St. Norbert has made the NCAA Division III playoff 13 times, with the first appearance being in 1989. The Green Knights have advanced to the second round on two occasions, the first time in 2003 after a double overtime victory over Simpson College by a score of 26–20, and most recently in 2018 after a 31–7 win over Trine University.

Year	Round	Opponent	Result	Record
1989	First Round	Central (IA)	L, 7–55	8–3
1999	First Round	Augustana (IL)	L, 32–39	9–2
2000	First Round	Central (IA)	L, 14–28	10–1
2001	First Round	Saint John's (MN)	L, 20–27	8–2
2003	First Round	Simpson (IA)	W, 26–20 ^{2OT}	11–1
2003	Second Round	Saint John's (MN)	L, 13–38	11–1
2004	First Round	Wisconsin–La Crosse	L, 23–37	9–2
2006	First Round	Wisconsin–Whitewater	L, 17–59	10–1
2007	First Round	Wisconsin–Eau Claire	L, 20–24	10–1
2010	First Round	North Central (IL)	L, 7–57	7–4
2012	First Round	St. Thomas (MN)	L, 17–48	8–3
2013	First Round	Wisconsin–Whitewater	L, 7–31	8–3
2015	First Round	Wisconsin–Whitewater	L, 0–48	10–1
2018	First Round	Trine	W, 31–7	10–2
2018	Second Round	Wisconsin–Whitewater	L, 21–54	10–2

=== Bowl games ===
St. Norbert has played in the Lakefront Bowl three times, which features the teams from the Midwest Conference (MWC) and the Northern Athletics Collegiate Conference (NACC) that places highest in each conference's standings and does not qualify for the NCAA Division III playoffs. St. Norbert has a record of 1–2 in this bowl game.

Year	Bowl	Coach	Opponent	Result	Record
2023	Lakefront Bowl	Dan McCarty	Monmouth (IL)	L 14–21	7–4
2024	Lakefront Bowl	Dan McCarty	Monmouth (IL)	W 20–14	8–3
2026	Lakefront Bowl	Dan McCarty	Chicago	L 21–28	6–5

== Facilities ==
St. Norbert has hosted the Green Bay Packers of the National Football League for their preseason training camp since 1958, the longest partnership between a professional team and a college in NFL history. During the Covid–19 Pandemic this relationship was put on hold, but the hope for both parties is to have it resume in the near future. In the 1980s and 1990s as many as five other NFL teams used campuses across Wisconsin and Minnesota for training camp in what was known as the Cheese League.

== Lambeau Field games ==
In 1982 and 1983, St. Norbert hosted Fordham, Vince Lombardi's alma mater, in two tilts, benefiting the Vince Lombardi Cancer Foundation at Lambeau Field. The first was held on November 20, 1982 and the second on November 19, 1983. The first game, a 14–10 St. Norbert win, drew 5,119 people. The second game, an 18–9 St. Norbert win, drew 842 people.
