= 1946 Indiana Intercollegiate Conference football season =

American college football season

- Sport: Football
- Teams: 15
- Champion: Butler

Football seasons
- 1945 1947

1946 Indiana Intercollegiate Conference football standings
	Conf.					Overall
Team	W		L		T	W		L		T
Butler $	6	–	0	–	0	7	–	1	–	0
Evansville	2	–	0	–	0	7	–	1	–	2
Wabash	5	–	1	–	0	7	–	1	–	0
Earlham	4	–	2	–	0	5	–	3	–	0
Saint Joseph's (IN)	2	–	1	–	0	3	–	4	–	0
Hanover	3	–	2	–	0	4	–	3	–	0
Franklin (IN)	3	–	3	–	0	4	–	4	–	0
Ball State	3	–	3	–	0	3	–	4	–	1
Indiana Central	3	–	4	–	0	3	–	4	–	0
Indiana State	2	–	4	–	0	4	–	4	–	0
Manchester	2	–	4	–	0	3	–	5	–	0
DePauw	1	–	2	–	0	1	–	5	–	2
Canterbury	1	–	4	–	0	1	–	7	–	0
Rose Poly	1	–	5	–	0	1	–	7	–	1
Valparaiso	0	–	3	–	0	1	–	7	–	0
$ – Conference champion

The 1946 Indiana Intercollegiate Conference football season was the season of college football played by the 15 member schools of the Indiana Intercollegiate Conference (IIC) as part of the 1946 college football season.

The Butler Bulldogs, in their ninth season under head coach Tony Hinkle, won the IIC championship with a 7–1 record (6–0 against IIC opponents). The Bulldogs led the conference in scoring with an average of 21.75 points scored per game. Four Butler players received first-team honors the 1946 All-Indiana Intercollegiate Conference football team: halfback Orville Williams, end Knute Dobkins, tackle Mel Perrone, and center Ott Hurrle.

The Evansville Purple Aces, in their first year under head coach Don Ping, finished in second place with a 7–1–2 record (2–0 against IIC opponents). Tackle Bob Hawkins was the only Evansville player to receive first-team honors on the all-conference team.

The Wabash Little Giants, led by head coach Glen Harmeson, finished in third place with a 7–1 record. Wabash led the conference in scoring defense, shutting out six of eight opponents and giving up an average of only 4.0 points per game. Three Wabash players received first-team all-conference honors: quarterback Frank Roman, fullback J.K. Allerdice, and guard Bill Duchon.

== Conference overview ==
Conf. rank	Team	Head coach	Conf. record	Overall record	Points scored	Points against
1	Butler	Tony Hinkle	6–0	7–1	174	63
2	Evansville	Don Ping	2–0	7–1–2	149	52
3	Wabash	Glen Harmeson	5–1	7–1	144	32
4	Earlham	J. Owen Huntsman	4–2	5–3	105	57
5	Saint Joseph's (IN)	Richard Scharf	2–1	3–4	59	81
6	Hanover	Don Veller	3–2	4–3	76	74
7	Franklin (IN)	Roy Tillotson	3–3	4–4	81	65
8	Ball State	John Magnabosco	3–3	3–4–1	101	67
9	Indiana Central	Ed Bright	3–4	3–4	44	92
10 (tie)	Indiana State	Wally Marks	2–4	4–4	70	59
10 (tie)	Manchester	Phili H. Kemmerer	2–4	3–5	68	120
12	DePauw	Robert L. Nipper	1–2	1–5–2	58	195
13	Canterbury	Henry G. Miller	1–4	1–7	43	140
14	Rose Poly	Phil Brown	1–5	1–7–1	46	155
15	Valparaiso	Emory Bauer	0–3	1–7	50	156

== Teams ==
=== Butler ===
1946 Butler Bulldogs football

IIC champion
- Conference: Indiana Intercollegiate Conference
- Record: 7–1 (6–0 IIC)
- Head coach: Tony Hinkle (9th season)
- Home stadium: Butler Bowl

The 1946 Butler Bulldogs football team was an American football team that represented Butler University as a member of the Indiana Intercollegiate Conference (IIC) during the 1946 college football season. In its ninth season under head coach Tony Hinkle, the team compiled a 7–1 record (6–0 against IIC opponents) and won the IIC championship. The team played its home games at the Butler Bowl in Indianapolis.

Date	Opponent	Site	Result	Attendance	Source
September 28	Eastern Illinois*	Butler Bowl; Indianapolis, IN	W 19–12	8,000	
October 5	Indiana State	Fairview Bowl; Indianapolis, IN	W 13–7	7,500	
October 12	at Western Michigan*	Waldo Stadium; Kalamazoo, MI	L 0–19	3,500	
October 19	at DePauw	Greencastle, IN	W 41–6	5,000	
October 26	Ball State^{†}	Butler Bowl; Indianapolis, IN	W 20–6	> 12,000	
November 2	Wabash	Butler Bowl; Indianapolis, IN	W 25–7	9,000	
November 9	Saint Joseph's (IN)	Fairview Bowl; Indianapolis, IN	W 31–6	5,000	
November 16	Valparaiso	Fairview Bowl; Indianapolis, IN	W 25–0	2,500	
*Non-conference game; ^{†}Homecoming

=== Evansville ===
1946 Evansville Purple Aces football
- Conference: Indiana Intercollegiate Conference
- Record: 7–1–2 (2–0 IIC)
- Head coach: Don Ping (1st season)
- Home stadium: Bosse Field

The 1946 Evansville Purple Aces football team represented Butler University as a member of the IIC. In their first season under head coach Don Ping, the Purple Aces compiled a 7–1–2 record (2–0 against IIC opponents), finished in second place in the IIC, and outscored opponents by a total of 149 to 52.

Date	Opponent	Site	Result	Attendance	Source
September 18	Southeast Missouri State*	Evansville, IN	T 0–0		
September 26	Louisville*	Evansville, IN	L 7–13		
October 5	at Illinois Wesleyan*	Memorial Stadium; Bloomington, IL	W 20–6		
October 12	at Indiana State	Terre Haute, IN	W 14–13		
October 19	at Marshall*	Fairfield Stadium; Huntington, WV	W 7–0	6,000	
October 26	Murray State*	Evansville, IN	W 20–0		
November 2	at Indiana Central	Southport Stadium; Indianapolis, IN	W 35–0		
November 9	Southern Illinois*	Reitz Bowl; Evansville, IN	W 21–7	6,500	
November 16	Arkansas State*	Bosse Field; Evansville, IN	W 6–6		
November 28	Northern Illinois State*	Reitz Bowl; Evansville, IN	W 19–7	9,000	
*Non-conference game

=== Wabash ===
1946 Wabash Little Giants football
- Conference: Indiana Intercollegiate Conference
- Record: 7–1 (5–1 IIC)
- Head coach: Glen Harmeson (1st season)

The 1946 Wabash Little Giants football team represented Wabash College of Crawfordsville, Indiana, as a member of the IIC. In their first season under head coach Glen Harmeson, the Little Giants compiled a 7–1 record (5–1 against IIC opponents), finished in third place in the IIC, shut out six of eight opponents, led the conference in scoring defense (4.0 points per game), and outscored opponents by a total of 144 to 32.

Date	Opponent	Site	Result	Attendance	Source
September 28	at Indiana State	Terre Haute, IN	W 13–0		
October 5	Franklin	Crawfordsville, IN	W 22–7	7,500	
October 12	Ball State	Ball State Field; Muncie, IN	W 6–0	4,500	
October 19	Rose Poly	Crawfordsville, IN	W 34–0		
October 26	at Centre*	Danville, KY	W 16–0	4,000	
November 2	at Butler	Butler Bowl; Indianapolis, IN	L 7–25	9,000	
November 9	Lake Forest*	Crawfordsville, IN	W 20–0		
November 16	DePauw	Crawfordsville, IN	W 26–0		
*Non-conference game

=== Earlham ===
1946 Earlham Quakers football
- Conference: Indiana Intercollegiate Conference
- Record: 5–3 (4–2 IIC)
- Head coach: J. Owen Huntsman

The 1946 Earlham Quakers football team represented Earlham College of Richmond, Indiana, as a member of the IIC. Led by head coach J. Owen Huntsman, the Quakers compiled a 5–3 record (4–2 against IIC opponents), finished in fourth place in the IIC, and outscored opponents by a total of 105 to 57.

Date	Opponent	Site	Result	Attendance	Source
October 4	at Indiana Central	Southport High School Stadium; Indianapolis, IN	L 7–13		
October 12	at Allegheny*	Meadville, PA	L 0–7		
October 18	at Wilmington*	Wilmington, OH	W 13–6		
October 26	Franklin^{†}	Whitewater Blvd. Field; Richmond, IN	W 7–0	2,500	
November 2	at DePauw	Greencastle, IN	L 6–13		
November 9	Canterbury	Whitewater Blvd. Field; Richmond, IN	W 27–6	1,200	
November 16	Manchester	Richmond, IN	W 19–6		
November 23	Rose Poly	Richmond, IN	W 26–6	3,000	
*Non-conference game; ^{†}Homecoming

=== Saint Joseph's ===
1946 Saint Joseph's Pumas football
- Conference: Indiana Intercollegiate Conference
- Record: 3–4 (2–1 IIC)
- Head coach: Richard Scharf

The 1946 Saint Joseph's Pumas football team represented Saint Joseph's College as a member of the IIC. Led by head coach Richard Scharf, the Pumas compiled a 3–4 record (2–1 against IIC opponents), finished in fifth place in the IIC, and were outscored by a total of 81 to 59.

Date	Opponent	Site	Result	Attendance	Source
October 5	at Valparaiso	Valparaiso, IN	W 7–0		
October 13	at Loras*	Dubuque, IA	W 13–0	4,000	
October 19	Indiana State	Rensselaer, IN	W 19–0		
October 27	at St. Ambrose	Municipal Stadium; Davenport, IA	L 7–14	5,000	
November 2	at Louisville*	Louisville, KY	L 7–13	7,500	
November 9	at Butler	Butler Bowl; Indianapolis, IN	L 6–31	5,000	
November 17	St. Norbert	Rensselaer, IN	L 0–23		
*Non-conference game

=== Hanover ===
1946 Hanover Panthers football
- Conference: Indiana Intercollegiate Conference
- Record: 4–3 (3–2 IIC)
- Head coach: Don Veller (1st season)

The 1946 Hanover Panthers football team represented Hanover College of Hanover, Indiana, as a member of the IIC. In their first season under head coach Don Veller, the Panthers compiled a 4–3 record (3–2 against IIC opponents), finished in sixth place in the IIC, and outscored opponents by a total of 76 to 74.

Date	Opponent	Site	Result	Attendance	Source
October 12	at Rose Poly	Madison, IN	W 7–0		
October 19	at Franklin	Franklin, IN	W 14–0		
October 26	Manchester	Hanover, IN	W 21–0		
November 2	Centre		W 27–20		
November 9	Indiana Central	Hanover, IN	L 0–6		
November 16	at Canterbury	Danville, IN	L 0–7		
November 23	at Georgetown	Georgetown, KY	L 7–41		

=== Franklin ===
1946 Franklin Grizzlies football
- Conference: Indiana Intercollegiate Conference
- Record: 4–4 (3–3 IIC)
- Head coach: Roy Tillotson (16th season)

The 1946 Franklin Grizzlies football team represented Franklin College of Franklin, Indiana, as a member of the IIC. In their 16th year under head coach Roy Tillotson, the Grizzlies compiled a 4–4 record (3–3 against IIC opponents), finished in seventh place in the IIC, and outscored opponents by a total of 81 to 65.

Date	Opponent	Site	Result	Attendance	Source
September 27	Indiana Central	Franklin High School Field; Franklin, IN	W 18–0		
October 5	at Wabash	Crawfordsville, IN	L 7–22	7,500	
October 11	Defiance	Franklin High School Field; Franklin, IN	L 6–15		
October 19	Hanover	Franklin, IN	L 0–14		
October 26	Earlham	Whitewater Blvd. Field; Richmond, IN	L 0–7	2,500	
November 2	Wilmington*	Franklin, IN	W 25–0		
November 9	at Manchester	North Manchester, IN	W 13–7		
November 16	Rose Poly		W 12–0		
*Non-conference game

=== Ball State ===
1946 Ball State Cardinals football
- Conference: Indiana Intercollegiate Conference
- Record: 3–4–1 (3–3 IIC)
- Head coach: John Magnabosco (11th season)

The 1946 Ball State Cardinals football team was an American football team that represented Ball State Teachers College (later renamed Ball State University) in the Indiana Intercollegiate Conference (ICC) during the 1946 college football season. In its 11th season under head coach John Magnabosco, the team compiled a 3–4–1 record (3–3 against ICC opponents) and finished in a tie for seventh place out of 15 teams in the conference.

Date	Opponent	Site	Result	Attendance	Source
September 28	Canterbury	Ball State Field; Muncie, IN	W 27–6		
October 5	at Bowling Green*	Bowling Green, OH	L 0–13		
October 12	Wabash^{†}	Ball State Field; Muncie, IN	L 0–6	4,500	
October 19	at Valparaiso	Valparaiso, IN	W 20–6	5,000	
October 26	at Butler	Butler Bowl; Indianapolis, IN	L 6–20	> 12,000	
November 2	Manchester	Ball State Field; Muncie, IN	W 41–6		
November 9	Michigan State Normal*	Ball State Field; Muncie, IN	T 7–7		
November 16	at Indiana State	Terre Haute, IN	L 0–3		
*Non-conference game; ^{†}Homecoming

=== Indiana Central ===
1946 Indiana Central Greyhounds football
- Conference: Indiana Intercollegiate Conference
- Record: 3–4 (3–4 IIC)
- Head coach: Ed Bright

The 1946 Indiana Central Greyhounds football team represented Indiana Central College (later renamed the University of Indianapolis) as a member of the IIC. Led by head coach Ed Bright, the Greyhounds compiled a 3–4 record (3–4 against IIC opponents), finished in ninth place in the IIC, and were outscored by a total of 92 to 44.

Date	Opponent	Site	Result	Attendance	Source
September 20	Canterbury	Southport's Roosevelt Stadium; Indianapolis, IN	W 6–0		
September 27	Franklin	Southport; Indianapolis, IN	L 0–18		
October 4	Earlham	Southport High School Stadium; Indianapolis, IN	W 13–7		
October 12	Manchester	Southport's Roosevelt Stadium; Indianapolis, IN	L 12–19		
	Rose Poly		L 7–13		
November 2	Evansville	Southport Stadium; Indianapolis, IN	L 0–35		
November 9	at Hanover	Hanover, IN	W 6–0		

=== Indiana State ===
1946 Indiana State Sycamores football
- Conference: Indiana Intercollegiate Conference
- Record: 4–4 (2–4 IIC)
- Head coach: Wally Marks (14th season)

The 1946 Indiana State Sycamores football team was an American football team that represented Indiana State University as a member of the Indiana Intercollegiate Conference (IIC) during the 1946 college football season. In its 14th non-consecutive season under head coach Wally Marks, and its first since the end of World War II, the team compiled a 4–4 record (2–4 against IIC opponents) and outscored all opponents by a total of 70 to 59. The team played its home games in Terre Haute, Indiana.

Date	Opponent	Site	Result	Attendance	Source
September 21	Illinois State Normal*	Terre Haute, IN	W 13–0		
September 28	Wabash	Terre Haute, IN	L 0–13		
October 5	at Butler	Indianapolis, IN	L 7–13	7,500	
October 12	Evansville	Terre Haute, IN	L 13–14		
October 19	at Saint Joseph's (IN)	Rennselaer, IN	L 0–19		
October 26	at Canterbury	Danville, IN	W 21–0		
November 9	Eastern Illinois*(Homecoming)	Terre Haute, IN	W 13–0		
November 16	Ball State	Terre Haute, IN	W 3–0		
*Non-conference game

=== Manchester ===
1946 Manchester Spartans football
- Conference: Indiana Intercollegiate Conference
- Record: 3–5 (2–4 IIC)
- Head coach: Phili H. Kemmerer

The 1946 Manchester Spartans football team represented Manchester University of North Manchester, Indiana, as a member of the IIC. Led by head coach Phili H. Kemmerer, the Spartans compiled a 3–5 record (2–4 against IIC opponents), finished in a tie for tenth place in the IIC, and were outscored by a total of 120 to 68.

Date	Opponent	Site	Result	Attendance	Source
	Rose Poly		W 9–7		
	Defiance		L 0–7		
	Indiana Central		W 19–12		
	Bluffton		W 21–0		
	Hanover		L 0–21		
November 2	at Ball State	Ball State Field; Muncie, IN	L 6–41		
	Franklin		L 7–13		
	Earlham		L 6–19		

=== DePauw ===
1946 DePauw Tigers football
- Conference: Indiana Intercollegiate Conference
- Record: 1–5–2 (1–2 IIC)
- Head coach: Robert L. Nipper (1st season)

The 1946 DePauw Tigers football team represented DePauw University of Greencastle, Indiana, as a member of the IIC. In their first and only season under head coach Robert L. Nipper, the Tigers compiled a 1–5–2 record (1–2 against IIC opponents), finished in 12th place in the IIC, and were outscored by a total of 195 to 58.

Date	Opponent	Site	Result	Attendance	Source
September 28	Lawrence*	Greencastle, IN	T 19–19		
October 5	at Illinois State*	McCormick Field; Normal, IL	L 0–18		
October 19	Butler	Greencastle, IN	L 6–41	5,000	
	Rochester*		L 6–32		
October 26	Ohio Wesleyan*		L 7–46		
November 2	Earlham	Greencastle, IN	W 13–6		
November 9	Oberlin*	Greencastle, IN (Old Gold Day)	T 7–7	5,000	
November 16	at Wabash	Crawfordsville, IN	L 0–26		
*Non-conference game

=== Canterbury ===
1946 Canterbury Purple Warriors football
- Conference: Indiana Intercollegiate Conference
- Record: 1–7 (1–4 IIC)
- Head coach: Henry G. Miller

The 1946 Canterbury Purple Warriors football team represented Canterbury College of Danville, Indiana, as a member of the IIC. Led by head coach Henry G. Miller, the Purple Warriors compiled a 1–7 record (1–4 against IIC opponents), finished in 13th place in the IIC, and were outscored by a total of 140 to 43.

Date	Opponent	Site	Result	Attendance	Source
	Indiana Central		L 0–6		
September 28	at Ball State	Ball State Field; Muncie, IN	L 6–27		
	Cedarville		L 6–14		
October 18	at Muskingum	McConagha Stadium; New Concord, OH	L 12–32		
October 26	Indiana State	Danville, IN	L 0–21		
	Defiance		L 6–13		
	Earlham		L 6–27		
	Hanover		W 7–9		

=== Rose Poly ===
1946 Rose Poly Engineers football
- Conference: Indiana Intercollegiate Conference
- Record: 1–7–1 (1–5 IIC)
- Head coach: Phil Brown (16th season)

The 1946 Rose Poly Engineers football team represented Rose Polytechnic Institute of Terre Haute, Indiana (now known as Rose–Hulman Institute of Technology) as a member of the IIC. In their 16th non-consecutive season under head coach Phil Brown, the Engineers compiled a 1–7–1 record (1–5 against IIC opponents), finished in 14th place in the IIC, and were outscored by a total of 155 to 46.

Date	Opponent	Site	Result	Attendance	Source
	Manchester		L 7–9		
	Rio Grande*		L 6–28		
October 12	Hanover	Madison, IN	L 0–7		
October 19	at Wabash	Crawfordsville, IN	L 0–34		
	Indiana Central		W 13–7		
	Principia*		T 0–0		
	Cedarville*		L 14–32		
November 16	Franklin		L 0–12		
November 23	at Earlham	Richmond, IN	L 6–26	3,000	
*Non-conference game

=== Valparaiso ===
1946 Valparaiso Crusaders football
- Conference: Indiana Intercollegiate Conference
- Record: 1–7 (0–3 IIC)
- Head coach: Emory Bauer (1st season)

The 1946 Valparaiso Crusaders football team represented Valparaiso University as a member of the IIC. In their first season under head coach Emory Bauer, the team compiled a 1–7 record (0–3 against IIC opponents), finished in last place in the IIC, and were outscored by a total of 156 to 50.

Date	Opponent	Site	Result	Attendance	Source
	Niagara		L 0–31		
October 5	St. Joseph's	Valparaiso, IN	L 0–7		
October 12	Concordia*	Valparaiso, IN	L 7–28		
October 19	Ball State	Valparaiso, IN	L 6–20	5,000	
October 26	at Eastern Kentucky*	Richmond, KY	L 7–12		
	Hamline		W 17–7		
November 8	at Western Michigan	Waldo Stadium; Kalamazoo, MI	L 13–26	3,500	
November 16	at Butler	Butler Bowl; Indianapolis, IN	L 0–25	2,500	
*Non-conference game

== All-conference team ==
The IIC coaches selected a 1946 All-Indiana Conference football team. Conference champion Butler placed four players on the first team: halfback Orville Williams, end Knute Dobkins, tackle Mel Perrone, and center Ott Hurrle. Wabash followed with three players named to the first team: quarterback Frank Roman, fullback J.K. Allerdice, and guard Bill Duchon. Indiana State, despite finishing 10th in the conference, placed two on the first team: halfback Max Woolsey and guard Dick Guyer.

First team

- Quarterback: Frank Roman, Wabash
- Halfback: Orville Williams, Butler; Max Woolsey, Indiana State
- Fullback: J.K. Allerdice, Wabash
- Ends: Mike Patanelli, Ball State; Knute Dobkins, Butler
- Tackles: Mel Perrone, Butler; Bob Hawkins, Evansville
- Guards: Bill Duchon, Wabash; Dick Guyer, Indiana State
- Center: Ott Hurrle, Butler
