= Detroit Institute of Technology =

Technical college in Detroit, Michigan, US (1891–1981)

Coordinates: 42°20′24.0″N 83°03′41.9″W

- Former name: Association Institute
- Type: Private technical college
- Active: 1891–1981
- Affiliations: YMCA
- Location: Detroit, Michigan, United States
- Campus: Urban
- Nickname: Dynamics
- Sporting affiliations: NAIA
- Website: LTU's Detroit Tech page

The Detroit Institute of Technology was a private four-year technical college in Detroit, Michigan, that closed operations in 1981.

== History ==
First called the Association Institute, the private school was founded in 1891 as a YMCA evening school and later developed into a private engineering and science college, formalizing its evening adult education program. It undertook several name changes in the early 20th century, using the name Detroit Technical Institute by 1908 and changing it again to Detroit Institute of Technology in 1918.

By 1920 it had six schools in operation. Out of these, four offered undergraduate degrees: The College of Law offered a four-year program. (Note: It was interrelated with the Detroit College of Law.)

The College of Pharmacy was added in 1907 after separating from the School of Medicine. The College of Commerce offered four-year programs in accounting, marketing, management, finance, and production. The School of Engineering had electrical, mechanical, chemical, automotive, and machine trade programs leading to a B.S. degree.

It also included The Hudson School, a high school offering a college prep program as well as training in business and technology for students who did not plan to attend college and the Detroit School of Religion. In 1922 the College of Liberal Arts was also added. In 1957, the pharmacy program merged with the School of Pharmacy at Wayne State University.

The college was accredited by the North Central Association of Colleges and Schools (NCA).

By 1979, a third of its students were Iranian citizens. As the Iran Hostage Crisis led to the cancellation of their visas, the college abruptly lost a large percentage of its students. This loss of income, paired with the early 1980s recession, proved too much for the institute, which formally closed down in 1982. Registrar's Office Detroit Institute of Technology (D.I.T.) The Lawrence Technological University in Southfield, Michigan, was issued custody of the academic records of the Detroit Institute of Technology by the Michigan Department of Education. It also offers alumni programs.

== Buildings ==
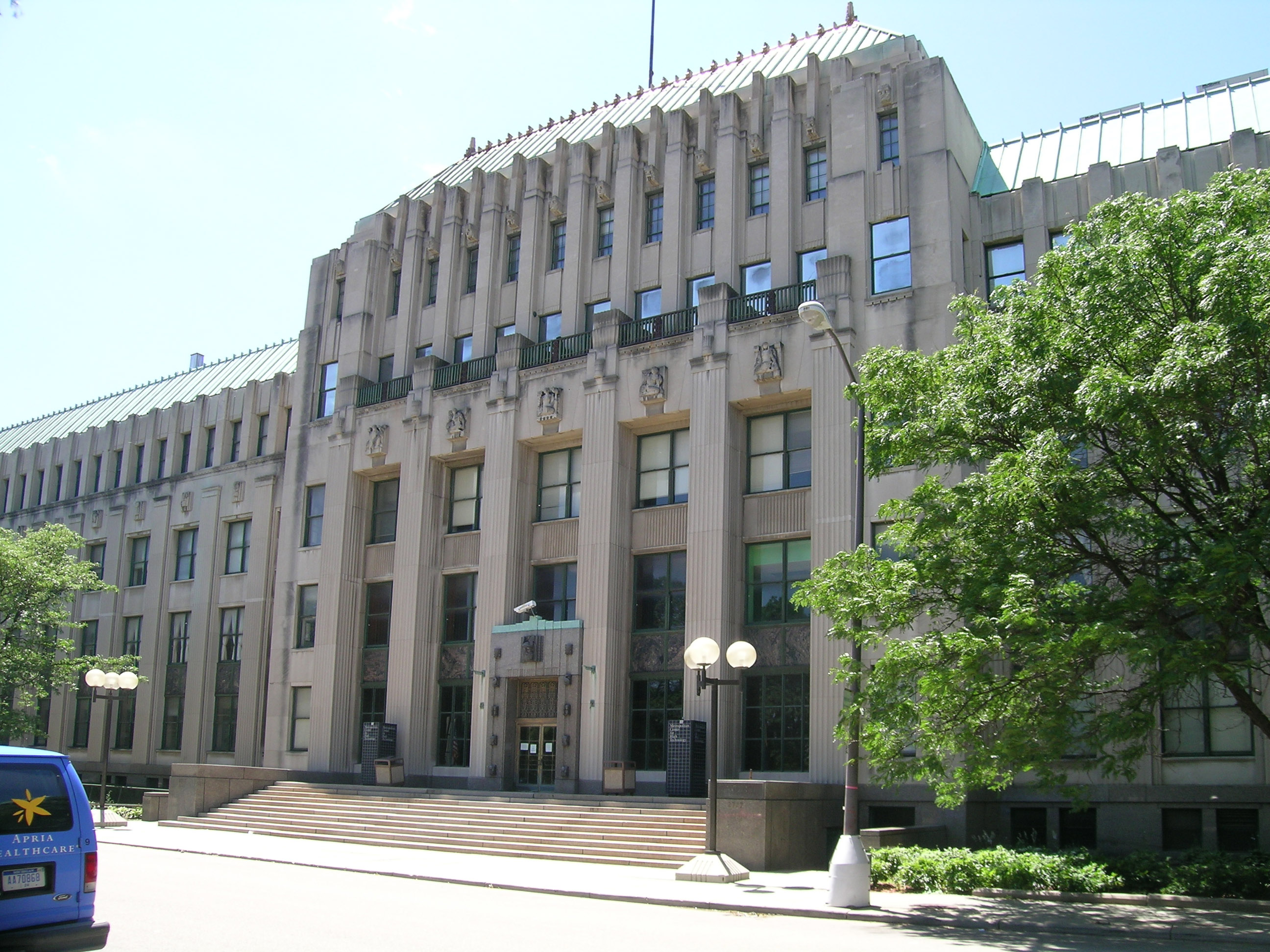
The Kresge Building, currently the Metropolitan Center for High Technology

The first quarters of the college were a YMCA Building on the corner of Griswold and Grand River. Having outgrown the building, it moved to a large nine-story YMCA building on the corner of Witherell and East Adams that included reading rooms, a library, two gymnasiums, swimming pools, handball courts and five floors of residence rooms. That building was later razed to make way for Comerica Park, the new home of the Detroit Tigers baseball team.

In 1971, the S. S. Kresge Corporation, which was moving to Troy, Michigan, donated its downtown Detroit headquarters to the school. This art deco building which stands across from Cass Park in downtown Detroit was built in 1928 by famous Detroit architect Albert Kahn and was added to the National Register in 1979. After the college's demise, this building became a part of Wayne State University where it is used as an incubator for startup companies, and is currently referred to as the Metropolitan Center for High Technology.

== Athletics ==
The Detroit Institute of Technology competed in basketball since at least 1921, when the first mention of their team, the Dynamics, is made. Between 1928 and 1950, with a break during World War II, the college also fielded a football team. The team disbanded again at the outbreak of the Korean War, this time permanently. The college played in the NAIA College Division and its traditional colors were purple and white.

In 1957, the college added a competitive swimming team that trained in the YMCA pool but never held competitions there as it could not accommodate spectators. During the first few years, the team competed in National N.A.I.A Championships never finishing lower than fourth, place but never winning a national team championship. It gave scholarships to local high school outstanding swimmers for a period of five years before reducing the team size and in 1966, dropped the sport entirely.

== Notable alumni ==
Henry Ford – inventor and business magnate, founder of Ford Motor Company

Richard H. Austin - Michigan Secretary of State from 1971 to 1995

Julius Goldman – Canadian basketball player, important modernizer of the game

Mike Kostiuk – Canadian-born NFL player

Ron Milner – playwright

James M. Nederlander – longtime chairman of the Nederlander Organization

Sugar Chile Robinson – jazz pianist and child prodigy

Roy Brooks – jazz drummer

Astronaut Wally Schirra was on the faculty from 1968 till 1972

Detroit Free Press chief photographer Tony Spina.
