= 1950 Canterbury Knights football team =

American college football season

1950 Canterbury Knights football

HCC champion
- Conference: Hoosier College Conference
- Record: 8–0 (6–0 HCC)
- Head coach: Robert Meyne (3rd season)
- Offensive scheme: Split-T
- Captains: Bob Courtney; Bob Smith

1950 Hoosier Conference football standings
	Conf.					Overall
Team	W		L		T	W		L		T
Canterbury $	6	–	0	–	0	8	–	0	–	0
Anderson (IN)	4	–	1	–	1	4	–	3	–	2
Hanover	3	–	2	–	0	3	–	5	–	1
Taylor	3	–	2	–	0	5	–	4	–	0
Indiana Central	2	–	4	–	1	3	–	5	–	1
Manchester (IN)	2	–	4	–	0	3	–	6	–	0
Earlham	1	–	4	–	0	3	–	5	–	0
Franklin (IN)	1	–	5	–	0	2	–	7	–	0
$ – Conference champion

The 1950 Canterbury Knights football team was an American football team that represented Canterbury College of Danville, Indiana, as a member of the Hoosier College Conference (HCC) during the 1950 college football season. In their third year under head coach Robert Meyne, the Knights compiled a perfect 8–0 record (6–0 in conference games), won the HCC championship, and outscored opponents by a total of . It was Canterbury's first HCC championship.

The team operated from a newly adopted split-T offense during the 1950 season.

Bob Courtney, Canterbury's 5'8", 155-pound halfback and co-captain, led the conference with 19 touchdowns and 114 points scored. Courtney also played at safety on defense and was selected to the 1950 Little All-Indiana football team. Other Canterbury players named to the Little All-Indiana team were: center John Syrek; tackle Joe Springer; and defensive guard Abie Carter. Springer was a 285-pound sophomore who played on offense and defense, despite not playing football before enrolling at Canterbury, and was a key blocker for Courtney. Other key players included freshman quarterback George Barlow, right halfback Evan Fine, and senior fullback Trent Gipson.

Walt Ney and Stan Lobred were assistant coaches.

== Schedule ==
Date	Opponent	Site	Result	Attendance	Source
September 23	at Franklin (IN)	Franklin, IN	W 14–6		
September 30	Taylor	Danville, IN	W 25–0		
October 7	at Earlham	Richmond, IN	W 12–7		
October 14	at Hanover	Danville, IN	W 21–20		
October 21	at Anderson (IN)	East Fifth Street Athletic Field; Anderson, IN	W 38–25	3,300	
October 28	Rose Poly*	Danville, IN	W 40–7		
November 4	at Indiana Central	Manual Field; Indianapolis, IN	W 7–6		
November 11	at Saint Joseph's (IN)*	Lebanon, IN	W 14–7		
*Non-conference game
