= Mike Manley (American football) =

American football coach (1951–2021)

Biographical details
- Born: May 1, 1951; Mount Sterling, Kentucky, U.S.
- Died: January 20, 2021 (aged 68); Naples, Florida, U.S.
- Education: Anderson College (1972)

Playing career

Football
- 1968–1971: Anderson (IN)
- Position: Quarterback

Coaching career (HC unless noted)

Football
- 1972?–1976: Bullitt Central HS (KY) (assistant)
- 1977–1979: Bullitt Central HS (KY)
- 1980: Ashland HS (KY)
- 1981: Morehead State (OC/QB/WR)
- 1982–1997: Anderson (IN)

Girls' basketball
- ?: Montgomery County HS (KY) (?)

Head coaching record
- Overall: 68–86–3 (college); 25–22 (high school)
- Tournaments: 0–1 (NCAA D-III playoffs)

Accomplishments and honors

Championships
- 1 ICAC (1993)

Michael Steven Manley (May 1, 1951 – January 20, 2021) was an American college football coach and high school football coach. He was the head football coach for Anderson University from 1982 to 1997. He also was the head football coach for Bullitt Central High School from 1977 to 1979 and Ashland High School—now known as Paul G. Blazer High School—in 1980.

== Playing career ==
Manley played high school football for Mount Sterling High School—now known as Montgomery County High School—as a quarterback. In his senior year he was an honorable mention All-State player. He played college football for Anderson College—now known as Anderson University—under head coach Dick Young. He was a member of the 1970 team that made an appearance in the 1970 NAIA Division II National Championship.

== Coaching career ==
Following Manley's graduation from Anderson, he served as an assistant coach for Bullitt Central High School until 1976. From 1977 to 1979, he served as the head football coach for Bullitt Central. In his final season, the school won the district championship and finished the year with a 10–2 record. In 1980, he became the head football coach for Ashland High School—now known as Paul G. Blazer High School. He only coached for the 1980 season and led them to a 9–4 record. In 1981, Manley was hired by Morehead State as the team's offensive coordinator, quarterbacks coach, and wide receivers coach under head coach Steve Loney. In 1982, Manley was hired by his alma mater, Anderson, to be the successor to Kevin Donley. In sixteen years with the school he led them to an overall record of 68–86–3. His best season came in 1993 when they won the Indiana Collegiate Athletic Conference (ICAC) title and made an appearance in the NCAA Division III playoffs. He resigned following the 1997 season as the school's all-time leader in wins.

Sometime after Manley's resignation from Anderson and his death in 2021 he coached girls' basketball for Montgomery County High School.

== Death and honors ==
On January 20, 2021, Manley died of a heart attack in Naples, Florida.

In 2023, the 1970 Anderson Ravens football team Manley was the quarterback of was elected into the Anderson (IN) Hall of Fame.

== Head coaching record ==
=== College ===
Year	Team	Overall	Conference	Standing	Bowl/playoffs	NAIA D2^{#}
Anderson Ravens (Hoosier–Buckeye Conference) (1982–1985)
1982	Anderson	4–5	4–4	T–4th		
1983	Anderson	6–3	5–2	3rd		18
1984	Anderson	2–5–2	2–3–1	4th		
1985	Anderson	3–6	1–5	T–5th		
Anderson Ravens (Indiana Collegiate Athletic Conference) (1986–1997)
1986	Anderson	2–7–1				
1987	Anderson	0–10				
1988	Anderson	5–5				
1989	Anderson	2–8	1–6	7th		
1990	Anderson	3–7	3–4	5th		
1991	Anderson	5–5	4–2	T–2nd		
1992	Anderson	5–5	3–3	4th		
1993	Anderson	10–1	6–0	1st	L NCAA Division III First Round	
1994	Anderson	6–4	3–3	T–4th		
1995	Anderson	6–4	2–4	T–5th		
1996	Anderson	7–3	3–3	T–3rd		
1997	Anderson	2–8	1–5	T–6th		
Anderson:		68–86–3	38–44–1			
Total:		68–86–3				

=== High school ===
Year	Team	Overall	Conference	Standing	Bowl/playoffs
Bullitt Central Cougars () (1977–1979)
1977	Bullitt Central	1–10			
1978	Bullitt Central	5–6			
1979	Bullitt Central	10–2		1st	
Bullitt Central:		16–18			
Ashland Tomcats () (1980)
1980	Ashland	9–4			
Ashland:		9–4			
Total:		25–22			
National championship Conference title Conference division title or championship game berth
