= 1953 Indiana Central Greyhounds football team =

American college football season

1953 Indiana Central Greyhounds football

HCC champion
- Conference: Hoosier Collegiate Conference
- Record: 8–0 (6–0 HCC)
- Head coach: Dave Shaw (2nd season)
- Home stadium: Delavan Smith Field

1953 Hoosier Conference football standings
	Conf.					Overall
Team	W		L		T	W		L		T
Indiana Central $	6	–	0	–	0	8	–	0	–	0
Earlham	4	–	2	–	0	6	–	2	–	0
Hanover	4	–	2	–	0	4	–	4	–	1
Anderson (IN)	3	–	3	–	0	3	–	5	–	0
Taylor	3	–	3	–	0	4	–	4	–	0
Franklin (IN)	1	–	5	–	0	1	–	7	–	0
Manchester (IN)	0	–	6	–	0	0	–	9	–	0
$ – Conference champion

The 1953 Indiana Central Greyhounds football team was an American football team that represented Indiana Central College (now known as the University of Indianapolis) as a member of the Hoosier Collegiate Conference (HCC) during the 1953 college football season. In their second and final year under head coach Dave Shaw, the Greyhounds compiled a perfect 8–0 record (6–0 against Hoosier opponents), won the HCC championship, and outscored opponents by a total of 154 to 52. The 1954 season was the only perfect season in Indianapolis Greyhounds football history.

Four Indiana Central players were selected as first-team players on the 1953 All-Hoosier football team: quarterback Dick Schrier; halfback Dick Nyers; center Abie Carter; and tackle John Hurrle. Two others were named to the second team: end Willis Oldham and guard Hal Cole. Nyers led the team on offense with 73 points scored.

The team played its home games at Delavan Smith Field in Indianapolis.

== Schedule ==
Date	Opponent	Site	Result	Attendance	Source
September 19	Taylor	Delavan Smith Field; Indianapolis, IN	W 18–6		
September 26	at Franklin (IN)	Goodell Field; Franklin, IN	W 18–0		
October 3	Earlham	Delavan Smith Field; Indianapolis, IN	W 7–6		
October 10	at Anderson (IN)	Anderson, IN	W 18–0		
October 17	at Hiram*	Hiram, OH	W 25–13		
October 24	Hanover	Delavan Smith Field; Indianapolis, IN	W 18–6		
October 31	at Ferris Institute*	Big Rapids, MI	W 19–7		
November 7	at Manchester (IN)	North Manchester, IN	W 31–14		
*Non-conference game

== Players ==
Regular players for Indiana Central, based on newspaper accounts cited above, were:

- Abie Carter, center, senior
- Hal Cole, guard, senior
- Jim Duncan
- Anastacio Martinez, guard, senior
- Dick Nyers, halfback, sophomore
- Jim Nye, end
- Willis Oldham, end
- Dean Ransburg, back, senior
- Marvin Schlosser, end, senior
- Dick Schrier, quarterback, junior
- Bill Schmutte, halfback
- Bob Vuillemot, fullback
