= Dick Young (American football coach) =

College athletics coach and educator (1937–2022)

Biographical details
- Born: November 15, 1937; Sapulpa, Oklahoma, U.S.
- Died: February 7, 2022 (aged 84); Indiana, U.S.
- Education: Municipal University of Wichita (1960); Ball State University; Ohio State University

Playing career

Football
- 1956–1959: Wichita
- Positions: Quarterback, defensive back

Coaching career (HC unless noted)

Football
- 1960–1961: Wichita (GA)
- 1962–1963: Anderson (IN) (RB)
- 1964–1975: Anderson (IN)

Wrestling
- 1975–?: Anderson (IN)

Tennis
- 1960–1961: Wichita (assistant)

Head coaching record
- Overall: 50–57–2 (football)
- Tournaments: 1–1 (NAIA D-II playoffs)

Accomplishments and honors

Championships
- 5 Hoosier / HBC (1965, 1968–1971)

Awards
- As player All-MVC (1959); As coach 3× Hoosier / HBC Coach of the Year; Anderson (IN) Hall of Fame (2000)

Richard M. Young (November 15, 1937 – February 7, 2022) was an American college football coach, wrestling coach, tennis coach, and educator. He was the head football coach for Anderson College—now known as Anderson University—from 1964 to 1975.

== Playing career ==
Young was a native of Sapulpa, Oklahoma, and played college football for the Municipal University of Wichita as a quarterback and defensive back. He earned All-Missouri Valley Conference (MVC) honors in his senior year.

== Coaching career ==
Young served as a graduate assistant for his alma mater, Wichita, from 1960 to 1961. Young joined Anderson College in 1962 as the running backs coach under head coach James Macholtz. In 1964, following Macholtz's resignation, Young was promoted to head football coach. In twelve years with the school he earned an overall record of 50–57–2. He won five Hoosier Conference / Hoosier–Buckeye Conference championships. He was also named the conference's coach of the year three times. He led the Ravens to a 9–2 record and reached the NAIA Division II National Championship in 1970. He resigned in April 1976.

Starting in 1975, Young coached Anderson's wrestling team.

Young also helped coach tennis for the Municipal University of Wichita from 1960 to 1962.

== Educator career and death ==
Young served on the department of physical education throughout his career. In 1979, Young was promoted to full-time professor in physical education.

Young was elected into the Anderson (IN) Hall of Fame in 2000.

Young died on February 7, 2022, following a short illness.

== Head coaching record ==
=== Football ===
Year	Team	Overall	Conference	Standing	Bowl/playoffs	NAIA D2^{#}
Anderson Ravens (Hoosier Conference / Hoosier–Buckeye Conference) (1964–1975)
1964	Anderson	2–7	1–4	T–5th		
1965	Anderson	4–5	4–1	1st		
1966	Anderson	1–7	1–4	5th		
1967	Anderson	1–7	1–4	6th		
1968	Anderson	6–3	5–1	T–1st		
1969	Anderson	8–1	6–0	1st		
1970	Anderson	9–2	3–1	T–1st	L NAIA Division II Championship	2
1971	Anderson	7–2	5–1	T–1st		9
1972	Anderson	4–4–1	2–4–1	7th		
1973	Anderson	3–6	2–5	7th		
1974	Anderson	3–6–1	3–4	T–6th		
1975	Anderson	2–7	2–6	T–6th		
Anderson:		50–57–2	35–35–1			
Total:		50–57–2				
National championship Conference title Conference division title or championship game berth
