= James Macholtz =

American football coach, track and field coach, and educator (1926–1985)

Biographical details
- Born: August 26, 1926; St. Joseph, Michigan, U.S.
- Died: April 29, 1985 (aged 58); Alexandria, Indiana, U.S.
- Education: Anderson College (1951); Indiana University Bloomington; University of Michigan

Playing career

Football
- 1947–1950: Anderson (IN)
- Position: Halfback

Coaching career (HC unless noted)

Football
- 1953–1963: Anderson (IN)

Track and field
- 1953?–1983?: Anderson (IN)

Head coaching record
- Overall: 54–35–2 (football)

Accomplishments and honors

Championships
- 3 Hoosier (1957, 1959, 1961)

Awards
- As player 3× First-Team All-Hoosier (1948–1950); As coach 2× Hoosier Coach of the Year (1957, 1959)

James D. Macholtz (August 26, 1926 – April 29, 1985) was an American college football coach, track and field coach, and educator. He was the head football coach for Anderson College—now known as Anderson University—from 1953 to 1964.

== Early life and playing career ==
Macholtz was born in St. Joseph, Michigan, and attended St. Joseph High School. He participated in basketball and football. As a senior was awarded the bronze Bausch and Lomb science award. He committed to play college football for Anderson College as a halfback. In four years with the team he earned three All-Hoosier Conference honors in his final three years.

== Coaching career ==
From 1953 to 1963, Macholtz was the head football coach for Anderson. In his eleven-year career with the school he led them to a 56–42–2 record along three Hoosier Conference titles in 1957, 1959, and 1961. His best seasons as head coach came from 1957 to 1959 as they won seven or more games with only one loss each season.

Macholtz served the track and field coach for Anderson for 25 years.

== Educator career ==
In 1964, Macholtz served as a Fulbright Program lecturer in the Philippines. He served as a physical education specialist.

Macholtz was a member of the physical education department for Anderson and was eventually the chairman for the department. In 1966, he was promoted to a full-time professor. In 1983, he became the dean of Anderson's School of Theoretical and Applied Sciences.

== Personal life, military career, and death ==
From 1944 to 1945, Macholtz served as a cadet in the United States Merchant Marine. From 1946 to 1947, he served in the United States Army.

Macholtz held a Bachelor of Science in physical education and chemistry from Anderson, a Master's degree from both the University of Michigan and Indiana University Bloomington, and a Doctorate from Indiana.

Macholtz was the author of the books "Good Times Together" and "How To Be A Winning Loser."

Throughout Macholtz's life he was an avid member of local churches, specifically he was the president of the International Young Fellowship. He was a member of the Park Place Church of God in Anderson, Indiana.

On April 29, 1985, Macholtz died suddenly of a heart attack while on a jog in Alexandria, Indiana.

Following Macholtz's death, Anderson College renamed its athletic field in his honor to Macholtz Stadium.

== Head coaching record ==
=== Football ===
Year	Team	Overall	Conference	Standing	Bowl/playoffs
Anderson Ravens (Hoosier Conference) (1953–1963)
1953	Anderson	3–5	3–3	T–4th	
1954	Anderson	2–7	2–4	T–4th	
1955	Anderson	4–5	3–3	T–4th	
1956	Anderson	6–2	5–1	2nd	
1957	Anderson	7–1	4–1	T–1st	
1958	Anderson	8–1	4–1	2nd	
1959	Anderson	7–1	5–0	1st	
1960	Anderson	6–2	3–2	T–2nd	
1961	Anderson	4–4	4–1	T–1st	
1962	Anderson	5–2–1	3–1–1	2nd	
1963	Anderson	2–5–1	2–2–1	4th	
Anderson:		54–35–2	38–19–2		
Total:		54–35–2			
National championship Conference title Conference division title or championship game berth
