= 1979 college football season =

The 1979 college football season may refer to:

- 1979 NCAA Division I-A football season
- 1979 NCAA Division I-AA football season
- 1979 NCAA Division II football season
- 1979 NCAA Division III football season
- 1979 NAIA Division I football season
- 1979 NAIA Division II football season
