= 1979 Findlay Oilers football team =

American college football season

1979 Findlay Oilers football

NAIA Division II champion Hoosier–Buckeye co-champion

NAIA Division II Championship Game, W 51–6 vs. Northwestern (IA)
- Conference: Hoosier–Buckeye Conference
- Record: 10–1–1 (7–1 Hoosier–Buckeye)
- Head coach: Dick Strahm (5th season)
- Offensive coordinator: Steve Mohr (3rd season)
- Defensive coordinator: Dean Pees (1st season)

1979 Hoosier–Buckeye Conference football standings
	Conf.					Overall
Team	W		L		T	W		L		T
No. 1 Findlay +^	7	–	1	–	0	10	–	1	–	1
No. 10 Hanover +	7	–	1	–	0	7	–	2	–	0
No. 16 Anderson (IN)	6	–	2	–	0	7	–	2	–	0
Wilmington (OH)	5	–	3	–	0	5	–	4	–	0
Manchester (IN)	4	–	4	–	0	4	–	5	–	0
Bluffton	3	–	5	–	0	3	–	6	–	0
Defiance	3	–	5	–	0	3	–	6	–	0
Taylor	1	–	7	–	0	1	–	8	–	0
Earlham	0	–	8	–	0	0	–	9	–	0
+ – Conference co-champions; ^ – NAIA Division II playoff participant; Rankings from NAIA Division II poll

The 1979 Findlay Oilers football team was an American football team that represented the University of Findlay as a member of the Hoosier–Buckeye Conference during the 1979 NAIA Division II football season. In their 23rd season under head coach Dick Strahm, the Oilers compiled a 10–1–1 record, outscored opponents by a total of 398 to 152, and won the NAIA national championship, defeating the Northwestern Red Raiders, 51–6, in the NAIA Championship Game.

== Schedule ==
Date	Opponent	Site	Result	Attendance	Source
September 15	Bluffton	Findlay, OH	W 40–0		
September 22	Wilmington (OH)	Findlay, OH	W 28–26		
September 29	at Manchester (IN)	North Manchester, IN	W 62–0		
October 6	at Ohio Northern*	Ada, OH	T 21–21		
October 13	Earlham	Findlay, OH	W 48–13		
October 20	at Anderson (IN)	Anderson, IN	W 21–6		
October 27	Taylor	Findlay, OH	W 29–27		
November 3	at Hanover	Hanover, IN	L 27–31		
November 10	Defiance	Findlay, OH	W 21–7		
November 17	Jamestown*	Findlay, OH (NAIA Division II quarterfinal)	W 41–15		
December 1	Pacific Lutheran*	Findlay, OH (NAIA Division II semifinal)	W 9–0	1,500	
December 8	Northwestern (IA)*	Findlay, OH (NAIA Division II Championship Game)	W 51–6		
*Non-conference game
