= Bill Bless =

American football and track coach (1939–2016)

Biographical details
- Born: May 27, 1939; Indianapolis, Indiana, U.S.
- Died: May 6, 2016 (aged 76); Greenwood, Indiana, U.S.

Playing career

Football
- 1959–1962: Indiana Central
- Position: Lineman

Coaching career (HC unless noted)

Football
- 1964–1965: Greensburg HS (IN) (assistant)
- 1966–1967: Greensburg HS (IN)
- 1968–1969: Whiteland HS (IN)
- 1970–1971: Indiana Central (assistant)
- 1972–1993: Indiana Central / Indianapolis

Head coaching record
- Overall: 114–99–9 (college football); 26–21–1 (high school football)
- Tournaments: Football; 0–1 (NCAA D-III playoffs)

William P. Bless (May 27, 1939 – May 6, 2016) was an American football and track coach. He is best known for his long tenure as head football coach at the University of Indianapolis (UIndy), where he led the Greyhound program from 1972 to 1993, compiling a record of 114–99–9. He holds the UIndy records for most seasons coached and most career victories.

Bless was born in Indianapolis and attended Warren Central High School on the city's east side. He was a lineman on the football team, co-captain and most valuable player in his senior year. He went on to UIndy (then known as Indiana Central) and was a four-year letterman from 1959 through 1962. He then posted a record of 26–21–1 as head football coach at Greensburg and Whiteland high schools, before returning to his alma mater in 1970 as head track coach and assistant football coach under Dick Nyers. Bless succeeded Nyers as head football coach two years later. Under his direction, the Greyhounds qualified for the NCAA Division III football championship playoffs in 1975 and won Heartland Collegiate Conference titles in 1978 and 1981; he was honored as conference coach of the year in each of those seasons. Bless was later inducted into the Indiana Football Hall of Fame (1994) and University of Indianapolis Athletics Hall of Fame (2003).

Bless served as a valued mentor for former players who became high school football coaches, including his sons Mark, Scott, and Tim, all of whom starred for the Greyhounds before going on to coaching careers at various central Indiana high schools.

A longtime resident of Greenwood, Indiana, Bless served on the Greenwood City Council for more than twenty years, and as acting mayor of Greenwood in 1991.

== Head coaching record ==
=== College football ===
Year	Team	Overall	Conference	Standing	Bowl/playoffs
Indiana Central Greyhounds (Indiana Collegiate Conference) (1972–1977)
1972	Indiana Central	4–6	2–3	T–4th	
1973	Indiana Central	7–3	2–3	T–4th	
1974	Indiana Central	5–5	2–4	T–4th	
1975	Indiana Central	8–3	5–1	2nd	L NCAA Division III Quarterfinal
1976	Indiana Central	6–4	3–2	3rd	
1977	Indiana Central	6–3–1	2–1–1	3rd	
Indiana Central / Indianapolis Greyhounds (Heartland Collegiate Conference) (1978–1989)
1978	Indiana Central	7–3	4–2	1st	
1979	Indiana Central	4–6	2–4	5th	
1980	Indiana Central	5–4–2	3–3–1	4th	
1981	Indiana Central	7–4	6–1	1st	
1982	Indiana Central	4–6	3–4	T–5th	
1983	Indiana Central	6–3–1	4–1–1	2nd	
1984	Indiana Central	8–2	4–2	T–2nd	
1985	Indiana Central	7–1–2	4–1–1	3rd	
1986	Indianapolis	7–2	5–1	2nd	
1987	Indianapolis	6–4	3–2	3rd	
1988	Indianapolis	5–4–1	1–2–1	4th	
1989	Indianapolis	4–5	2–2	T–2nd	
Indianapolis Greyhounds (Midwest Intercollegiate Football Conference) (1990–1993)
1990	Indianapolis	3–6–1	3–6–1	8th	
1991	Indianapolis	2–8	2–8	10th	
1992	Indianapolis	1–8–1	1–8–1	T–9th	
1993	Indianapolis	2–9	1–9	11th	
Indiana Central / Indianapolis:		114–99–9	64–70–7		
Total:		114–99–9			
National championship Conference title Conference division title or championship game berth
