= Mike Manley =

Michael (Mike) Manley may refer to:

- Michael Manley (1924–1997), fourth Prime Minister of Jamaica
- Mike Manley (artist) (born 1961), comic book illustrator and artist
- Mike Manley (athlete) (1942–2025), American middle and long-distance runner
- Mike Manley (lacrosse) (born 1988), lacrosse player
- Mike Manley (American football) (1951–2021), American football coach
- Michael Manley (CEO) (born 1964), CEO of Jeep and FCA
