= Phil Hower =

American football coach (1942–2014)

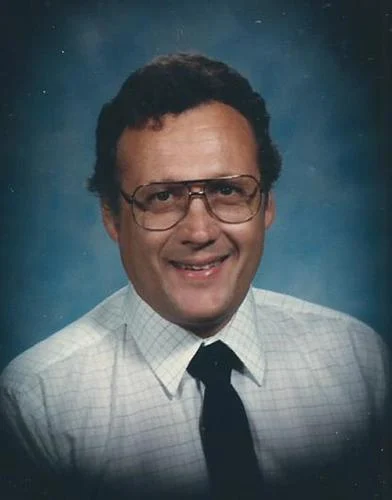

Biographical details
- Born: January 26, 1942; El Dorado, Kansas, U.S.
- Died: April 19, 2014 (aged 72); Winfield, Kansas, U.S.

Playing career
- 1961–1963: Southwestern (KS)
- Positions: Fullback, offensive guard, linebacker

Coaching career (HC unless noted)
- 1964–1965: Hugoton HS (KS)
- c. 1966: Kiowa HS (KS)
- 1969–1970: Independence HS (KS)
- 1972–1976: Scott City HS (KS)
- 1977–1980: Southwestern (KS)
- 1981–?: Winfield HS (KS) (assistant)
- 1984–1988: Winfield HS

Head coaching record
- Overall: 22–14 (college)

Philip Robert Hower (January 26, 1942 – April 19, 2014) was an American football coach and educator. He served as the head football coach at Southwestern College in Winfield, Kansas from 1977 to 1980, compiling a record of 22–14.

== Early life, education, and playing career ==
Hower was born on January 26, 1942 in El Dorado Kansas, to Robert Hower and Mildred Ruth (DeLong) Hower. He graduated from Winfield High School in Winfield, Kansas. Hower attended Southwestern College, where he played football and was named to the Methodist All-American University and Elevens team. While in college, he also worked as a firefighter and police officer.

== Coaching and teaching career ==
Hower served as the head football coach at Scott City High School in Scott City, Kansas from 1972 to 1976, leading his teams to a record of 30–17 in five seasons. In 1977, he was hired as the head football coach at Southwestern College, succeeding Jim Paramore. Hower resigned from his post at Southwestern in 1981 to return to Winfield High School as a math teacher and assistant football coach.

In later years, he was an assistant coach at Friends University in Wichita, Kansas. In his spare time, he coached softball, track, girls basketball and wrestling. He also taught math at Burden High School and Cowley Community College.

== Family and death ==
Hower married Sandra Flick in 1962; they had two daughters. Hower died of cancer, on April 19, 2014.

== Head coaching record ==
=== College ===
Year	Team	Overall	Conference	Standing	Bowl/playoffs
Southwestern Moundbuilders (Kansas Collegiate Athletic Conference) (1977–1980)
1977	Southwestern	7–2	6–2	3rd	
1978	Southwestern	7–2	7–1	2nd	
1979	Southwestern	5–4	5–3	4th	
1980	Southwestern	4–5	4–4	4th	
Southwestern:		23–13	22–10		
Total:		23–13			
