= 1997 college football season =

The 1997 college football season may refer to:

- 1997 NCAA Division I-A football season
- 1997 NCAA Division I-AA football season
- 1997 NCAA Division II football season
- 1997 NCAA Division III football season
- 1997 NAIA football season
