= Anderson High School Wigwam =

Indoor arena in Anderson, Indiana, US

The Wigwam
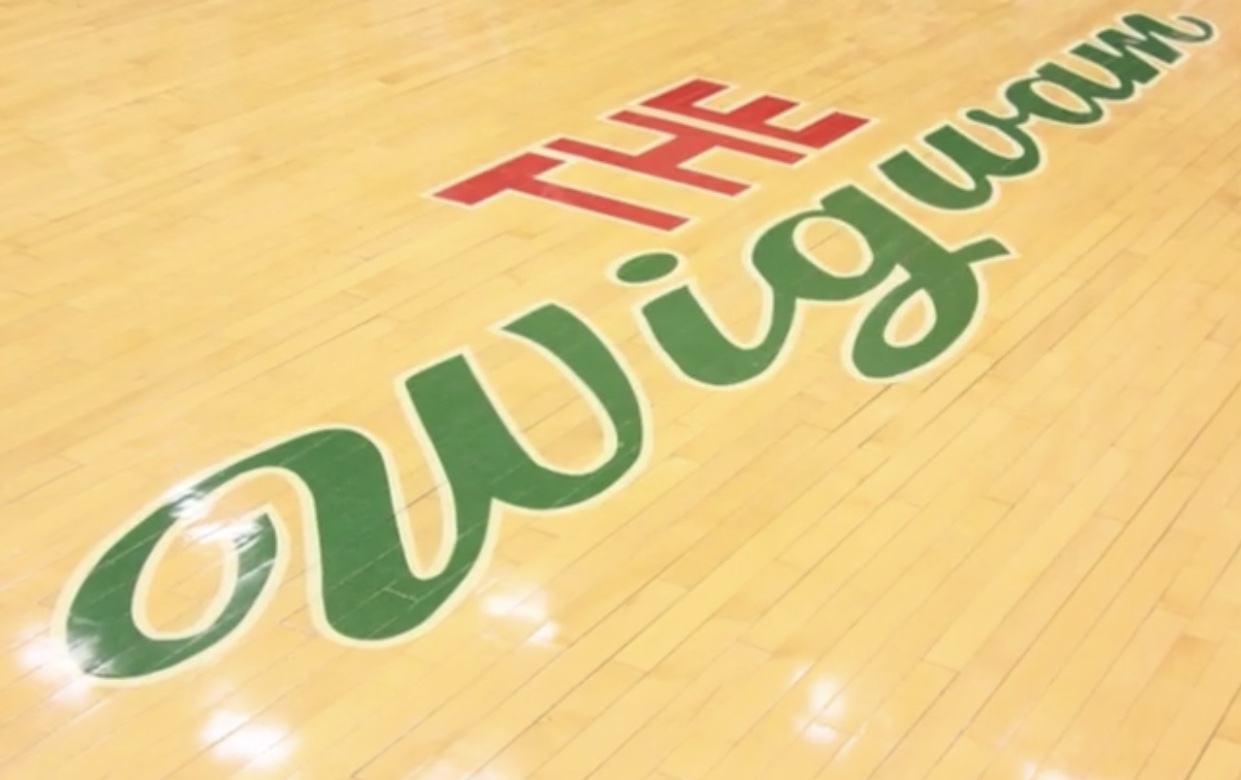
- Wigwam Court Logo

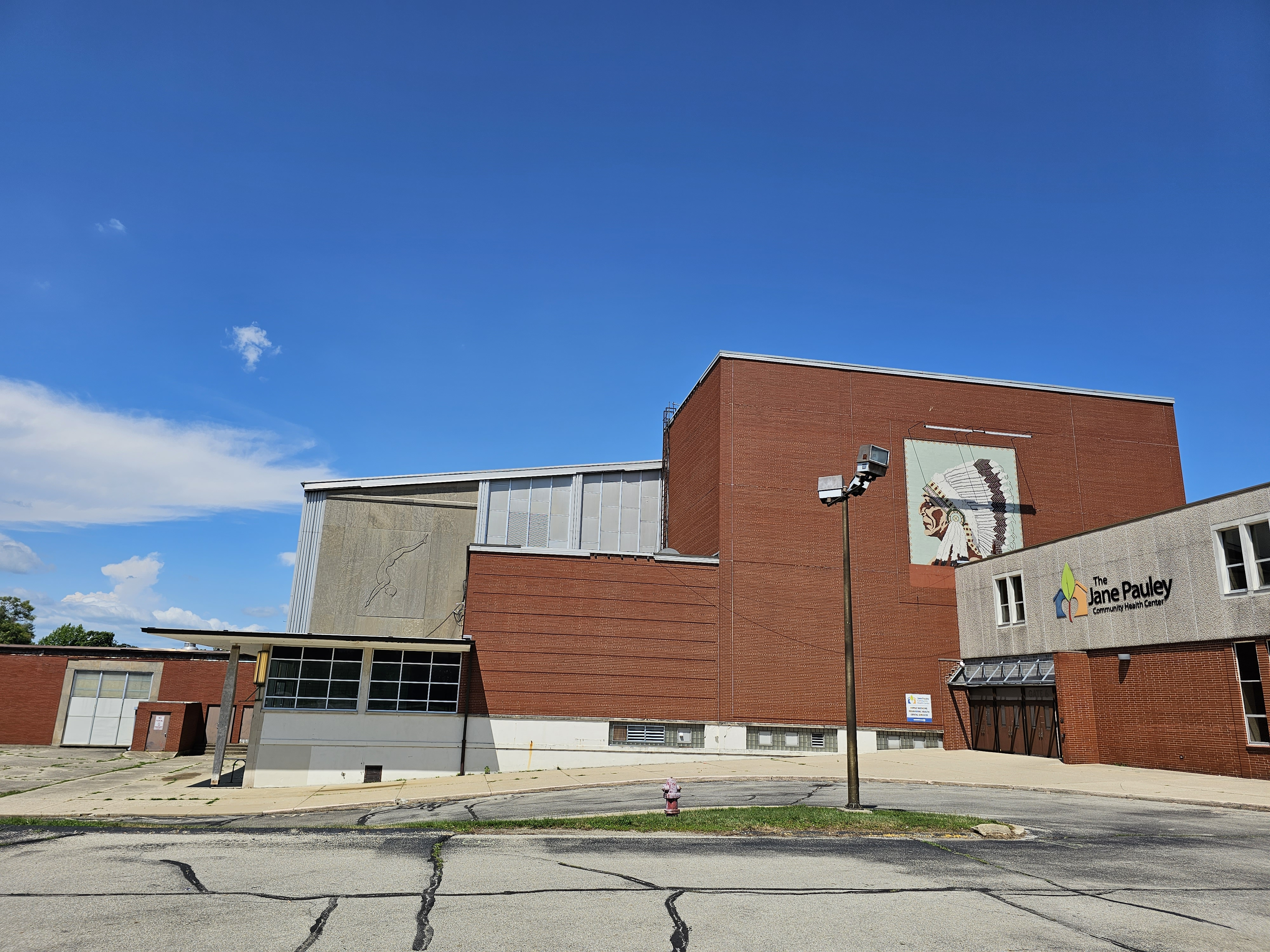
- Outside of the Wigwam. (Note, the 1927 Wigwam's front entrance was approximately at the location of the photographer.)

- Location within Indiana
- Full name: The Wigwam Complex
- Address: 1229 Lincoln Street Anderson, Indiana; Anderson; United States
- Location: Anderson, Indiana, U.S.
- Coordinates: 40°6′11″N 85°41′9″W
- Owner: BWI
- Seating type: Bleachers, padded seating
- Capacity: 8,996 (max 9,500)
- Type: Gymnasium
- Events: Sporting events, concerts, local events, etc.
- Record attendance: 10,000

Construction
- Opened: November 1961
- Renovated: 2021-ongoing
- Closed: 2011
- Cost: $2.1 Mil

Tenants
- Anderson (Duffey) Packers (NBL/NBA/NPBL) (1946–1951); Indiana Alley Cats (CBA) (2006–2007); Anderson High School

Anderson High School Wigwam is an indoor arena in Anderson, Indiana. The current version hosted home games for the Anderson High School Indians and was home to the Indiana Alley Cats of the Continental Basketball Association and the Anderson Champions of the American Basketball Association. The previous arena hosted Anderson Packers, a founding member of the National Basketball Association.

The complex is being redeveloped while preserving the gymnasium, which was listed on the National Register of Historic Places in 2018. It is currently under renovation and preparing for reopening in the near future.

== History ==
The original arena opened in 1937 behind the original high school building, bound by the high school, West 13th & West 14th Streets, and the railroad tracks (just east of John Street). (The site is now mostly covered by the new Wigwam's parking lot; West 13th Street has been rerouted.) The 6,073-seat arena hosted the Anderson High School Indians from 1927 to 1948, as well as the NBA's Anderson Packers from 1946 to 1950. It burned down in 1958. The replacement arena opened up in November 1961 and has a capacity of 8,996. It was considered the second-largest high school basketball arena, after New Castle Fieldhouse in New Castle, Indiana.

However, recent statistics show that the Wigwam was likely the largest. Fans of Seymour basketball, Seymour high school and a local newspaper hired a statistician who estimated New Castle's gym has a maximum capacity of about 7500 which would put the New Castle Chrystler High School Fieldhouse. the largest high school gymnasium in the country, into the spot of the 3rd largest gym. This would make Seymour High School's gymnasium complex the second largest, thus moving the now defunct Anderson Wigwam into first place. New Castle only spent a year in second place before renovating and taking back the top spot. Nevertheless, both gyms are at least 1000 seats smaller than the now closed but soon to be updated Anderson Wigwam.

Had this information been common knowledge in 2015, Anderson school district probably wouldn't have closed the doors to the rightly crowned largest high school gym in the world. Before the construction of Market Square Arena and when the Indiana Pacers could not secure dates at Indiana State Fairgrounds Coliseum, they played several games at the Wigwam. They hosted four playoff games at the court: Game 1 and Game 2 of the 1969 Western Division Finals, Game 5 of the 1971 Western Division Finals, and Game 3 of the 1972 Western Division Finals; the Pacers won each matchup.

On March 18, 2008, U.S. Secret Service agents met with members of Anderson Police Department for a tour at the Wigwam, where Hillary Clinton was due to speak. Her speech at the Wigwam occurred on March 20, 2008, and lasted about an hour. The school district netted $335 from the rental for this event.

Facing a budget crisis, on March 8, 2011, the Anderson School Board voted six to one to close the Wigwam to save an estimated $700,000 annually. In August 2014, the school board accepted a plan that would allow for redevelopment of the site while maintaining the gymnasium through at least 2030. One section of The Wigwam is currently home to the Jane Pauley Community Health Center–Wigwam, a non-profit clinic that offers primary and behavioral health care. There are plans to add more businesses in the future. When renovations are complete, the school district will have rent-free access to the arena for at least 12 event days per year, plus practices.

== See also ==
- Largest high school gyms in the United States
- List of indoor arenas in the United States
