= O. C. Lewis Gymnasium =

Multi-purpose arena in Anderson, Indiana

- Interactive map of O. C. Lewis Gymnasium
- Location: Anderson, Indiana; United States
- Coordinates: 40.114651°N 85.659899°W
- Capacity: 3,000

Construction
- Opened: 1962

Tenants
- Indiana Alley Cats (ABA) (2005–2006); Anderson Ravens (NCAA)

The O.C. Lewis Gymnasium is a 3000-seat multi-purpose arena in Anderson, Indiana, USA on the Anderson University campus. It hosts local sporting events and gymkhana. It was home to the Indiana Alley Cats, in 2005, and the Anderson University Ravens basketball teams. The arena opened in 1962.
