= Indiana Alley Cats =

Professional basketball team in Anderson, Indiana, US (2005–2008)

- Leagues: ABA 2005–06; CBA 2006–07
- Founded: 2005
- Folded: 2008
- History: Indiana Alley Cats (2005-2008)
- Arena: O. C. Lewis Gymnasium; 2005–06; Anderson High School Wigwam; 2006–07
- Location: Anderson, Indiana
- Team colors: red, white, black
- Head coach: Carlos Knox
- Ownership: Rob Blackwell

The Indiana Alley Cats were a member of the Continental Basketball Association (CBA). They were based in Anderson, Indiana, and played at Anderson High School Wigwam. The team was part of the American Basketball Association.

== History ==
The Alley Cats were announced as an expansion franchise for Indianapolis. Later, however, the team moved to Anderson, where they played at O. C. Lewis Gymnasium, on the campus of Anderson University. On the court, the Alley Cats were one of the most successful franchises in ABA history, posting a 27–4 record. Their winning percentage is only topped by that of the 2005–06 Utah Snowbears, who were 25–1. The Alley Cats were coached by Greg Graham. Despite this level of success, the second seed Alley Cats were upset by the 13th seed Strong Island Sound. Off the court, the Alley Cats struggled. Crowds hovered around 400-500 fans. The team was also featured in a Slam story.

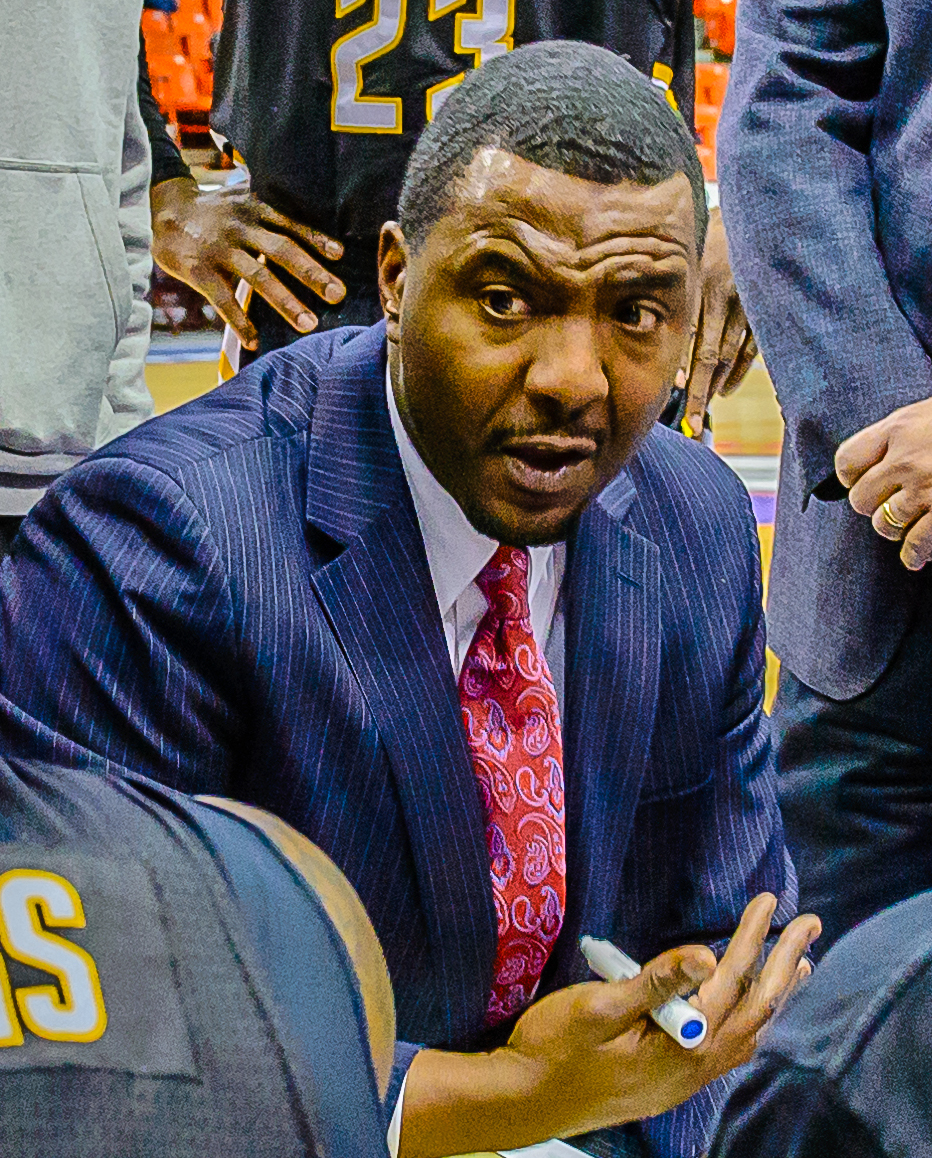
The Alley Cats were coached by Carlos Knox during the 2006–07 season.

The Alley Cats joined the CBA during the 2006–07 season. In addition to this, the team also hired Carlos Knox as head coach and moved home games to the Wigwam—a larger venue. The Alley Cats also became part of the Trinity Sports and Entertainment Group (led by NFL Quarterback Jay Fiedler), and remain there to this day.

While the Alley Cats enjoyed the comforts of a set schedule and a larger arena, success was hard to come by both on and off the court. The Alley Cats finished a mediocre 23–25. Brights spots were found in Shaun Fountain, who led the team in scoring and was named CBA Newcomer of the Year, and Will Caudle, who was named to the CBA All-Rookie Team. The Alley Cats did not make the playoffs, as for 2006–07, only the top two teams in the league made the playoffs. Off the court success was limited as well; the Anderson Herald-Bulletin reported that the team was having considerable difficulty marketing itself.

In a statement released by Trinity Sports & Entertainment Group, it was revealed that the Alley Cats were planning to move, most likely to Indianapolis; Trinity Sports & Entertainment Group was formed to acquire and manage professional sports franchises domestically and internationally and to provide quality, affordable entertainment to the masses. The Company owns 100% of both the Miami Majesty (formerly the Florida Pit Bulls) and the Indiana Alley Cats (fully acquired in May, 2007), both of which played in the ABA (American Basketball Association) during the 2005–06 season. Both teams were ranked in the top 5 ABA teams throughout the 2005–06 season. It was also revealed that over $800,000 had been poured into the team since Trinity took over operations. Another announcement stated that the Alley Cats would not resume play until 2008–09, but the team is now defunct.

== Standings ==
Regular season
Year	League	Wins	Losses	Percentage	Points	League	Division
2005–06	ABA	27	4	.871	—	1st	1st — Freddie Lewis Division
2006–07	CBA	23	25	.479	163.5	3rd	3rd — American Division

== See also ==
- Fort Wayne Mad Ants
- Evansville Thunder
- Gary Steelheads
