= 1997 Findlay Oilers football team =

American college football season

1997 Findlay Oilers football

NAIA national champion MSFA Midwest League champion

NAIA National Championship Game, W 14–7 vs. Willamette
- Conference: Mid-States Football Association
- Midwest League
- Record: 14–0 (6–0 MSFA)
- Head coach: Dick Strahm (23rd season)
- Home stadium: Donnell Stadium

1997 Mid-States Football Association standings
	Conf.			Overall
Team	W		L	W		L
Mideast League
No. 5 Geneva x^	6	–	0	11	–	2
No. 8 Westminster (PA) ^	5	–	1	9	–	2
No. 21 Walsh	4	–	2	7	–	3
Malone	3	–	3	5	–	5
Tri-State	2	–	4	4	–	6
Tiffin	1	–	4	4	–	7
Urbana	0	–	6	0	–	10
Midwest League
No. 1 Findlay x^	6	–	0	14	–	0
No. 24 Taylor	5	–	1	7	–	3
Olivet Nazarene	4	–	2	7	–	3
St. Ambrose	3	–	3	4	–	6
Iowa Wesleyan	1	–	5	4	–	7
Saint Xavier	1	–	5	1	–	9
Trinity International	1	–	5	1	–	9
x – League champion/co-champions ^ – NAIA playoff participant; Rankings from NAIA poll

The 1997 Findlay Oilers football team was an American football team that represented the University of Findlay as a member of the Midwest League within the Mid-States Football Association (MSFA) during the 1997 NAIA football season. In their 23rd season under head coach Dick Strahm, the Oilers compiled a perfect 14–0 record (6–0 against conference opponents), outscored opponents by a total of 567 to 179, and won the NAIA national championship, defeating Willamette, 14–7, in the NAIA Championship Game.

== Schedule ==
Date	Opponent	Site	Result	Attendance	Source
September 6	Campbellsville*	Findlay, OH	W 28–20		
September 20	at Mercyhurst*	Erie, PA	W 44–14		
September 27	at Tiffin*	Tiffin, OH	W 54–14		
October 4	at Olivet Nazarene	Bourbonnais, IL	W 35–24		
October 11	St. Ambrose	Findlay, OH	W 48–24		
October 18	Trinity International	Deerfield, IL	W 34–7		
October 25	Iowa Wesleyan	Findlay, OH	W 62–7		
November 2	Saint Xavier	Chicago, IL	W 70–8		
November 8	Taylor	Findlay, OH	W 55–7		
November 15	Tri-State*	Findlay, OH	W 29–15		
November 22	Westminster (PA)*	Findlay, OH (NAIA first round)	W 40–0		
December 6	Geneva*	Findlay, OH (NAIA quarterfinal)	W 28–7		
December 13	Doane*	Findlay, OH (NAIA semifinal)	W 26–25		
December 20	Willamette*	Jim Carroll Stadium; Savannah, TN (NAIA Championship Game)	W 14–7		
*Non-conference game
