= 1979 NAIA Division II football season =

American college football season

- Regular season: August–November 1979
- Postseason: November–December 1979
- National Championship: Donnell Stadium; Findlay, OH
- Champions: Findlay

The 1979 NAIA Division II football season, as part of the 1979 college football season in the United States and the 24th season of college football sponsored by the NAIA, was the 10th season of play of the NAIA's lower division for football.

The season was played from August to November 1979 and culminated in the 1979 NAIA Division II Football National Championship, played at Donnell Stadium in Findlay, Ohio.

The Findlay Oilers defeated the Northwestern Red Raiders in the championship game, 51–6, to win their first NAIA national title.

== Conference standings ==
1979 College Conference of Illinois and Wisconsin football standings
	Conf.					Overall
Team	W		L		T	W		L		T
Millikin $	7	–	1	–	0	8	–	1	–	0
Elmhurst	6	–	2	–	0	7	–	2	–	0
No. 11 Illinois Wesleyan	6	–	2	–	0	7	–	2	–	0
Augustana (IL)	5	–	3	–	0	6	–	3	–	0
North Central (IL)	5	–	3	–	0	6	–	3	–	0
North Park	4	–	4	–	0	4	–	5	–	0
Carroll (WI)	2	–	6	–	0	2	–	7	–	0
Wheaton (IL)	1	–	7	–	0	1	–	8	–	0
Carthage	0	–	8	–	0	0	–	8	–	1
$ – Conference champion; Rankings from NAIA Division II poll

1979 Frontier Conference football standings
	Conf.					Overall
Team	W		L		T	W		L		T
Montana Tech $	4	–	0	–	0	6	–	2	–	1
Carroll (MT)	4	–	1	–	0	6	–	2	–	0
Rocky Mountain	1	–	4	–	0	3	–	6	–	0
Western Montana	1	–	5	–	0	3	–	6	–	0
$ – Conference champion

1979 Heart of America Athletic Conference football standings
	Conf.					Overall
Team	W		L		T	W		L		T
No. 9 William Jewell +	5	–	1	–	0	9	–	2	–	0
Baker +	5	–	1	–	0	7	–	3	–	0
No. 12 Missouri Valley	4	–	2	–	0	7	–	2	–	1
Graceland	3	–	3	–	0	6	–	4	–	0
Ottawa	3	–	3	–	0	5	–	5	–	0
Central Methodist	1	–	5	–	0	2	–	7	–	0
Tarkio	0	–	6	–	0	0	–	9	–	0
+ – Conference co-champions; Rankings from NAIA Division II poll

1979 Hoosier–Buckeye Conference football standings
	Conf.					Overall
Team	W		L		T	W		L		T
No. 1 Findlay +^	7	–	1	–	0	10	–	1	–	1
No. 10 Hanover +	7	–	1	–	0	7	–	2	–	0
No. 16 Anderson (IN)	6	–	2	–	0	7	–	2	–	0
Wilmington (OH)	5	–	3	–	0	5	–	4	–	0
Manchester (IN)	4	–	4	–	0	4	–	5	–	0
Bluffton	3	–	5	–	0	3	–	6	–	0
Defiance	3	–	5	–	0	3	–	6	–	0
Taylor	1	–	7	–	0	1	–	8	–	0
Earlham	0	–	8	–	0	0	–	9	–	0
+ – Conference co-champions; ^ – NAIA Division II playoff participant; Rankings from NAIA Division II poll

1979 Illini–Badger Football Conference standings
	Conf.					Overall
Team	W		L		T	W		L		T
Milton +	3	–	1	–	0	6	–	2	–	1
Lakeland +	3	–	1	–	0	7	–	3	–	0
Northeastern Illinois	2	–	2	–	0	4	–	5	–	0
Eureka	1	–	3	–	0	2	–	6	–	0
Concordia (IL)	1	–	3	–	0	2	–	7	–	0
$ – Conference champion; Northeastern Illinois forfeited a win over Lakeland.

1979 Kansas Collegiate Athletic Conference football standings
	Conf.					Overall
Team	W		L		T	W		L		T
No. 4 Bethany (KS) $^	8	–	0	–	0	11	–	1	–	0
Tabor	7	–	1	–	0	7	–	3	–	0
Friends	6	–	2	–	0	7	–	2	–	0
Southwestern (KS)	5	–	3	–	0	5	–	4	–	0
McPherson	3	–	5	–	0	3	–	6	–	0
Bethel (KS)	3	–	5	–	0	3	–	6	–	0
Sterling	2	–	6	–	0	2	–	7	–	0
Kansas Wesleyan	2	–	6	–	0	2	–	7	–	0
St. Mary of the Plains	1	–	7	–	0	1	–	9	–	0
$ – Conference champion; ^ – NAIA Division II playoff participant; Rankings from NAIA Division II poll

1979 Minnesota Intercollegiate Athletic Conference football standings
	Conf.					Overall
Team	W		L		T	W		L		T
No. 13 Saint John's (MN) +	6	–	2	–	0	7	–	2	–	0
St. Olaf +	6	–	2	–	0	7	–	3	–	0
No. 15 Concordia–Moorhead +	6	–	2	–	0	6	–	3	–	0
No. 17 St. Thomas (MN) +	6	–	2	–	0	6	–	3	–	0
Gustavus Adolphus	5	–	3	–	0	7	–	3	–	0
Hamline	3	–	5	–	0	5	–	5	–	0
Augsburg	3	–	5	–	0	4	–	6	–	0
Bethel (MN)	1	–	7	–	0	2	–	8	–	0
Macalester	0	–	8	–	0	0	–	8	–	0
+ – Conference co-champions; Rankings from NAIA Division II poll

1979 Nebraska Intercollegiate Athletic Conference football standings
	Conf.					Overall
Team	W		L		T	W		L		T
No. T–5 Midland $^	5	–	0	–	0	9	–	1	–	0
Concordia (NE)	3	–	2	–	0	7	–	3	–	0
Hastings	2½	–	2½	–	0	6	–	4	–	0
Doane	1½	–	2½	–	1	5	–	4	–	1
Nebraska Wesleyan	1	–	3	–	1	3	–	5	–	1
Dana	1	–	4	–	0	3	–	6	–	0
$ – Conference champion; ^ – NAIA Division II playoff participant Hastings and Doane played twice; each game counted as ½ of a game in the conference standings.; Rankings from NAIA Division II poll

1979 North Dakota College Athletic Conference football standings
	Conf.					Overall
Team	W		L		T	W		L		T
No. 8 Jamestown $^	6	–	0	–	0	9	–	1	–	0
No. 19 Dickinson State	4	–	2	–	0	7	–	2	–	0
Valley City State	4	–	2	–	0	6	–	3	–	0
Wahpeton Science	3	–	3	–	0	4	–	3	–	1
Minot State	3	–	3	–	0	4	–	4	–	0
Mayville State	1	–	5	–	0	1	–	7	–	1
Bismarck JC	0	–	6	–	0	?	–	?	–	?
$ – Conference champion; ^ – NAIA Division II playoff participant; Rankings from NAIA Division II poll

1979 Northwest Conference football standings
	Conf.					Overall
Team	W		L		T	W		L		T
No. 2 Pacific Lutheran $^	5	–	0	–	0	9	–	2	–	0
No. 14 Linfield	4	–	1	–	0	6	–	3	–	1
Willamette	3	–	2	–	0	6	–	3	–	1
Whitworth	2	–	3	–	0	4	–	4	–	1
Lewis & Clark	1	–	4	–	0	5	–	4	–	0
Pacific (OR)	0	–	5	–	0	1	–	8	–	0
$ – Conference champion; ^ – NAIA Division II playoff participant; Rankings from NAIA Division II poll

1979 South Dakota Intercollegiate Conference football standings
	Conf.					Overall
Team	W		L		T	W		L		T
Black Hills State $	5	–	0	–	1	6	–	3	–	1
Dakota State	5	–	1	–	0	7	–	3	–	0
South Dakota Tech	4	–	1	–	1	5	–	4	–	1
Sioux Falls	3	–	3	–	0	3	–	7	–	0
South Dakota–Springfield	2	–	4	–	0	2	–	7	–	0
Huron	1	–	5	–	0	2	–	7	–	0
Dakota Wesleyan	0	–	6	–	0	0	–	10	–	0
$ – Conference champion

1979 Southern California Intercollegiate Athletic Conference football standings
	Conf.					Overall
Team	W		L		T	W		L		T
Claremont-Mudd $	4	–	1	–	0	6	–	3	–	0
Whittier	3	–	2	–	0	5	–	4	–	0
Redlands	3	–	2	–	0	3	–	6	–	0
La Verne	2	–	3	–	0	4	–	5	–	0
Pomona-Pitzer	2	–	3	–	0	3	–	5	–	0
Occidental	1	–	4	–	0	2	–	6	–	1
$ – Conference champion

1979 Texas Intercollegiate Athletic Association football standings
	Conf.					Overall
Team	W		L		T	W		L		T
No. T–5 Austin $^	7	–	1	–	0	9	–	2	–	0
McMurry	6	–	2	–	0	8	–	3	–	0
Tarleton State	4	–	4	–	0	6	–	4	–	0
Sul Ross	2	–	6	–	0	4	–	6	–	0
Trinity (TX)	1	–	7	–	0	4	–	7	–	0
Lubbock Christian	0	–	0	–	0	1	–	8	–	0
$ – Conference champion; ^ – NAIA Division II playoff participant; Rankings from NAIA Division II poll

1979 Tri-State Conference football standings
	Conf.					Overall
Team	W		L		T	W		L		T
No. 3 Northwestern (IA) $^	2	–	0	–	0	10	–	2	–	0
No. 20 Westmar	2	–	1	–	0	7	–	3	–	0
Yankton	0	–	3	–	0	5	–	6	–	0
$ – Conference champion; ^ – NAIA Division II playoff participant; Rankings from NAIA Division II poll

1979 NAIA Division II independents football records
	Conf.			Overall
Team	W	L	T	W		L		T
No. 7 Cal Lutheran ^		–		7	–	2	–	1
Waynesburg		–		6	–	3	–	0
No. 18 Peru State		–		6	–	4	–	0
Westminster (PA)		–		4	–	5	–	0
Chadron State		–		4	–	5	–	1
Azusa Pacific		–		3	–	4	–	1
Oklahoma Panhandle State		–		4	–	6	–	0
Texas Lutheran		–		4	–	6	–	0
Geneva		–		3	–	6	–	0
Simon Fraser		–		3	–	6	–	0
Benedictine (KS)		–		2	–	8	–	0
Iowa Wesleyan		–		2	–	8	–	0
^ – NAIA Division II playoff participant; Rankings from NAIA Division II poll

== Conference champions ==
Conference	Champion	Record
Frontier	Montana Tech	4–0
Heart of America	William Jewell; Baker (KS)	5–1
Hoosier-Buckeye	Findlay; Hanover	7–1
Kansas	Bethany	8–0
Minnesota	Concordia–Moorhead; Saint John's (MN); St. Olaf; St. Thomas (MN)	6–2
Nebraska	Midland Lutheran	5–0
North Dakota	Jamestown	4–0
South Dakota	Black Hills State	5–0–1
Texas	Austin College	7–1

== Postseason ==
Quarterfinals; Campus sites
Midland Lutheran	27
Northwestern (IA)‡	40
Austin	24
Bethany (KS)*	35
Pacific Lutheran	34
Cal Lutheran*	14
Jamestown	15
Findlay*	41

Semifinals; Campus sites
Northwestern (IA)*	49
Bethany (KS)	21
Pacific Lutheran	0
Findlay*	9

Championship; Findlay, OH
Northwestern (IA)	6
Findlay*	51

- ‡ Game played at Vermillion, South Dakota

== See also ==
- 1979 NAIA Division I football season
- 1979 NCAA Division I-A football season
- 1979 NCAA Division I-AA football season
- 1979 NCAA Division II football season
- 1979 NCAA Division III football season
