= Macholtz Stadium =

Multi-purpose stadium in Anderson, Indiana

- Interactive map of Macholtz Stadium
- Location: Anderson University; Anderson, Indiana; United States
- Coordinates: 40.116349°N 85.661173°W
- Owner: Anderson University
- Operator: Anderson University
- Capacity: 4,300
- Surface: Artificial turf

Construction
- Opened: 1977
- Renovated: 2008

Tenants
- Anderson University Ravens (NCAA Sports)

Macholtz Stadium is a 4,300-seat multi-purpose stadium in Anderson, Indiana. The facility opened in 1977, is located on the campus of Anderson University, and is named in honor of Dr. James Macholtz who served as coach of the Anderson University football, Track and Field programs, and men's and women's lacrosse.

== Uses ==
The stadium is primarily used for American football and track and field. It is home to the Anderson University football and track and field teams.

In 2015, the Indianapolis Colts returned to Macholtz Stadium for training camp.

== Major renovations ==
In 2008, the university completed a renovation project with the overall cost at approximately $800,000. Improvements included an artificial turf field and outdoor all-weather lights. The field enhancements were funded through new gift resources as a part of the university's $110 million "Dreams. Discovery. Direction" campaign.
