= 1979 Southwestern Moundbuilders football team =

American college football season

1979 Southwestern Moundbuilders football
- Conference: Kansas Collegiate Athletic Conference
- Record: 4–5 (4–4 KCAC)
- Head coach: Phil Hower (3rd season)
- Captains: Jeff Crow; Tony Gray; Bob Morgan

1979 Kansas Collegiate Athletic Conference football standings
	Conf.					Overall
Team	W		L		T	W		L		T
No. 4 Bethany (KS) $^	8	–	0	–	0	11	–	1	–	0
Tabor	7	–	1	–	0	7	–	3	–	0
Friends	6	–	2	–	0	7	–	2	–	0
Southwestern (KS)	5	–	3	–	0	5	–	4	–	0
McPherson	3	–	5	–	0	3	–	6	–	0
Bethel (KS)	3	–	5	–	0	3	–	6	–	0
Sterling	2	–	6	–	0	2	–	7	–	0
Kansas Wesleyan	2	–	6	–	0	2	–	7	–	0
St. Mary of the Plains	1	–	7	–	0	1	–	9	–	0
$ – Conference champion; ^ – NAIA Division II playoff participant; Rankings from NAIA Division II poll

The 1979 Southwestern football team represented Southwestern College as a member of the Kansas Collegiate Athletic Conference (KCAC) during the 1979 NAIA Division II football season. Led by third-year head coach Phil Hower, the Moundbuilders compiled an overall record of record of 4–5 with a mark of 4–4 in conference play.

== Schedule ==
Date	Opponent	Site	Result
September 15	Ottawa (KS)	Winfield, KS	L 13–14
September 22	at Bethany (KS)	Lindsborg KS	L 0–27
September 29	Sterling	Winfield, KS	W 16–0
October 6	at McPherson	McPherson KS	W 20–7
October 13	Tabor	Winfield, KS	W 21–28
October 20	Bethel (KS)	Winfield, KS	W 14–7
October 27	at Kansas Wesleyan	Salina, KS	L 7–9
November 3	at St. Mary of the Plains	Dodge City KS	L 12–17
November 10	Friends	Winfield, KS	L 0–3

== Roster ==
Brodie Atwater, B. Hurd, Tony Gray(received all-KCAC/All District 10/Small College All-American Honors), Ollis Anderson, Jeff Crow, Charlie Wilson, T. Bailey, Bob Morgan, C. Golladay, K. Bauer, S. Ba D. Delaney, S. Woods, Dave Clark, John Tuttle, Rick McKinney, Jude Dinges, B. Bruner, G. Ballard, Jerry Thomas, J. Homan, J. Snyder, M. Henderson, S. Stahl, C. Cruse, D. Drennan, K. Vandegrift, Bill Gies, K. Seal, Scott Bruner, W. Morris, R. Irvin, D. See, S. Heinrich, M. Williams, D. Anzelmo, K. Lowe, M. Fox, Jeff Camp, P. Tasker, M. Diener, C. Patterson, John Washington, A. Stewart, R. Trict, W? Davison, B. Talent, Paul Homan, Curt Davison, D. Barker, K. Keeling, D. Poage, Terry Elder, S. Rempel, H. Hull, M. Richardson, M. Williams, L. Steele, D. Huch, M. Homan, Tim Cargile, B. Fox, G. Feste, S. Werner, A. Isenberg, B. Roy, T. Thurber, D. Smith, M. Duensing, M. Jensen, E. Kingsley, Clay Stone, S. Davis, Charlie Hill, J. Phillips, D. Davis, J. Kill, T. Price, Tom Audley, K. Allender, Mngr D. Whitehill, Darrell Drennan, Steve Barker
