= Indianapolis Greyhounds =

Collegiate sports club in the United States

- University: University of Indianapolis
- Nickname: Greyhounds
- NCAA: Division II
- Conference: Great Lakes Valley Conference
- Athletic director: Kim Pate
- Location: Indianapolis, Indiana
- Varsity teams: 25
- Football stadium: Key Stadium
- Basketball arena: Nicoson Hall
- Baseball stadium: Greyhound Park
- Other venues: Ruth Lilly Center
- Colors: Crimson and grey
- Mascot: Grady (live), Ace (costumed)
- Website: athletics.uindy.edu
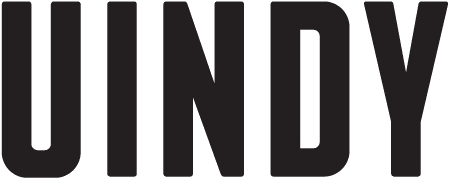

The Indianapolis Greyhounds, also the UIndy Greyhounds, are the athletic teams that represent the University of Indianapolis (UIndy), located in Indianapolis, Indiana. The Greyhounds compete in NCAA Division II as members of the Great Lakes Valley Conference (GLVC). Indianapolis has been a member of the GLVC since 1978 and, as of 2022, was the only remaining charter member of the conference. On June 24, 2026, it was announced that the Greyhounds will leave the GLVC for the Great Midwest Athletic Conference (G-MAC) effective July 1, 2027.

== History ==
The university was known as Indiana Central from its founding in 1902 until the adoption of its current name in 1986. Varsity sports records date from 1922, with the hiring of the first full-time coach and athletic director. The Greyhound nickname for athletic teams dates from 1926. The original school colors, cardinal and grey, predated the athletic program, and eventually gave way to crimson and grey. The current "flying I" athletic department logo dates from 2007, when it was adopted as the helmet logo for Greyhound football.

Football is the only sport that the university has ever dropped, then reintroduced. The program was established in 1924, dropped in 1932 and restored in 1946. Women's field hockey is the only other sport to have been dropped, in 1976.

In recent years, the Greyhounds have emerged as one of the top all-around athletics programs in Division II. Since 2011–12, Indianapolis has placed in the top ten of the Division II Learfield Directors' Cup standings twelve times (including a second-place finish in 2023–24 and third-place finish in 2025–26), and has won every GLVC All-Sports Trophy. As of spring 2023, when they earned their first GLVC titles in wrestling and women's swimming & diving, the Greyhounds had won at least one GLVC championship in each of the program's 23 sports. UIndy has since added two more women's sports, bowling and triathlon, both of which began competition in fall 2024.

== Varsity teams ==
Men's sports	Women's sports
Baseball	Basketball
Basketball	Bowling
Cross country	Cross country
Football	Golf
Golf	Lacrosse
Lacrosse	Soccer
Soccer	Softball
Swimming	Swimming
Tennis	Tennis
Track and field^{1}	Track and field^{1}
Wrestling	Triathlon
	Volleyball
^{1} – includes both indoor and outdoor

== National championships ==
Greyhound teams have won five NCAA national championships.

Association	Division	Sport	Year	Opponent/Runner-up	Score	Notes
NCAA	Division II	Women's Golf	2015	Rollins	1212 (+60) – 1217 (+65)	
NCAA	Division II	Women's Golf	2018	California Baptist	1157 (+5) – 1195 (+43)	
NCAA	Division II	Women's Lacrosse	2022	East Stroudsburg	11–9	
NCAA	Division II	Men's swimming and diving	2023	Drury	527–450.5 (+76.5)	
NCAA	Division II	Women's Golf	2024	St. Mary's (TX)	2–2–1 match play (sudden death tiebreaker)	

== Conference championships and postseason play ==
=== Conference affiliations ===
- Indiana Intercollegiate Conference (IIC) 1923–1947
- Hoosier College Conference (HCC) 1947–1970
- Indiana Collegiate Conference (ICC) 1970–1978
- Heartland Collegiate Conference (Heartland) 1978–1990 (football-only 1985–1989 seasons)
- Midwest Intercollegiate Football Conference (football-only 1990–1998 seasons)
- Great Lakes Intercollegiate Athletic Conference (GLIAC) associate member in football, 1999–2011; M/W swimming & diving, 2000–2013; women's lacrosse, 2016–2019
- Great Lakes Valley Conference (GLVC) 1978–2027
- Great Midwest Athletic Conference (G-MAC) effective July 1, 2027

=== Men's teams ===
- Baseball – 19 conference championships: nine HCC (1949, 1952, 1953, 1954, 1956, 1958, 1959, 1961, 1964), two ICC (1971, 1973), two Heartland (1981, 1982), and six GLVC (1981, 1982, 1984, 2001, 2012, 2016). Postseason play includes five appearances in the NCAA D2 World Series (2000, 2012, 2023, 2024, 2026).
- Basketball – 12 conference championships: three IIC (1933–34, 1940–41, 1941–42), eight HCC (1948–49, 1950–51, 1955–56, 1959–60, 1962–63, 1963–64, 1964–65, 1966–67), and one GLVC (1996–97). Eight NAIA national tournament appearances (1948–49, 1955–56, 1963–64, 1965–66, 1966–67, 1968–69) and twelve NCAA D2 tournament appearances (1995–96, 1996–97, 2002–3, 2003–4, 2004–5, 2011–12 through 2015–16, 2022–23, 2023–24). David Logan named 2004–5 NCAA D2 National Player of the Year.
- Cross Country – 14 conference championships: eight HCC (1950, 1951, 1952, 1958, 1959, 1961, 1963, 1965), five ICC (1972, 1974, 1975, 1976, 1977), and one GLVC (2000). Individual HCC champion James Langford (1947). Individual GLVC champions Erhard Bell (1979) and John Parson (2003).
- Football – 18 conference championships: five HCC (1947, 1953, 1954, 1955, 1960), two Heartland (1978, 1981), and eleven GLVC (2012 through 2015, 2017, 2018, 2020–21, 2022, 2023, 2024, 2025). One NCAA D3 playoff appearance (1975) and ten NCAA D2 playoff appearances (2012, 2013, 2015, 2017, 2018, 2019, 2022, 2023, 2024, 2025).
- Golf – 18 conference championships: one Heartland (1978–79) and 17 GLVC (1978–79, 1987–88 through 1992–93, 1996–97, 1996–97, 1998–99, 2001–2, 2007–8, 2008–9, 2012–13, 2013–14, 2017–18, 2023–24). Postseason play includes national third-place finish in D2 tournament (2022–23). Individual NCAA D2 champion Keegan Bronnenberg (2020–21).
- Lacrosse – Three GLVC championships (2018, 2019, 2021). Five NCAA D2 tournament appearances (2019, 2021, 2022, 2023, 2024). National semifinal appearance in 2019 (16–3 record), in just the fourth year of the program's existence.
- Soccer – Four GLVC championships (2014, 2017, 2021, 2023). Eight NCAA D2 tournament appearances (2013, 2015, 2017, 2019, 2021, 2022, 2023, 2025). National semifinal appearances in 2019 and 2021.
- Swimming and Diving – Six GLVC championships (2017–18, 2018–19, 2019–20, 2021–22, 2023–24, 2025–26). (NOTE: program competed as independent, 1985 through 2000). NCAA D2 postseason action includes one national championship (2022–23), five national third-place finishes (2017–18, 2018–19, 2020–21, 2021–22, 2023–24) and one national fourth-place finish (2025–26). 25 individual NCAA championships including seven by Orel Oral (1999–2000 through 2002–3), plus four relay championships. At the 2024 Summer Olympics, Cedric Büssing became the first active Division II swimmer to qualify for an Olympic final (in the 400m individual medley), as a member of the German Olympic team.
- Tennis – 17 conference championships: two HCC (1954–55, 1959–60) and 15 GLVC (1978–79, 1988–89, 1990–91 through 1994–95, 2015–16 through 2018–19, 2022–23 through 2025–26). Postseason play includes D2 national finals appearance in 2017–18 and semifinal appearance in 2022–23.
- Track and Field – Outdoor: 14 conference championships, including three HCC (1951, 1962, 1963), one ICC (1973), two Heartland (1980, 1981), and eight GLVC (2002, 2003, 2010 through 2013, 2019, 2026). (Note: program competed as independent, 1986 through 1995). Indoor: Seven GLVC championships (2010 through 2013, 2018, 2019, 2026). Twelve individual NCAA championships (10 outdoor, 2 indoor) including three by Randy Heisler in the discus (1982, 1983, 1984).
- Wrestling – 12 conference championships: five HCC (1965, 1966, 1968, 1969, 1970), six ICC (1971, 1973, 1975, 1976, 1977, 1978), and one GLVC (2023). (Note: program competed as independent, 1956 through 1964 and 1986 through 2016). Postseason NCAA D2 action includes a national 6th-place finish (2022) and a national 7th-place finish (2023). Individual NCAA D2 champions Nick Walpole at 149 (2011) and Derek Blubaugh at 197 (2024, 2025).

=== Women's teams ===
- Basketball – Two GLVC championships (1992–93, 2002–3). 11 NCAA D2 tournament appearances (1992–93, 1993–94, 2002–3, 2003–4, 2004–5, 2007–8, 2008–9, 2009–10, 2011–12, 2012–13, 2013–14).
- Cross Country – Two GLVC championships (1992, 2018). Individual GLVC champions Kathy Casey (1988) and Lauren Bailey (2020).
- Golf – 17 GLVC championships (1999–2000, 2000–2001, 2001–2, 2008–9, 2009–10, 2011–12 through 2018–19, 2020–21, 2021–22, 2023–24, 2024–25). Three NCAA D2 national championships (2014–15, 2017–18, 2023–24), one national second-place finish (2015–16), three national third-place finishes (2008–9, 2016–17, 2018–19). Individual NCAA D2 champions Lyndsay McBride (2008–9) and Katharina Keilich (2017–18).
- Lacrosse – Seven conference championships: two GLIAC (2018, 2019) and five GLVC (2021, 2022, 2023, 2024, 2026). Eight NCAA D2 tournament appearances (2018, 2019, 2021 through 2026). Midwest Region champions in 2022 and 2025. National champions in 2022 (22–1 record), in just the seventh season of the program's existence. Peyton Romig named 2021 D2 National Player of the Year. Abby Lagos named 2022 D2 National Player of the Year.
- Soccer – One GLVC championship (2006). Four NCAA D2 tournament appearances (2006, 2009, 2019, 2021).
- Softball – Four GLVC championships (2012, 2016, 2021, 2025). 18 NCAA D2 tournament appearances (2008 through 2019, 2021 through 2026). Three appearances in the NCAA D2 World Series (2009, 2015, 2024).
- Swimming and Diving – Four conference championships: three GLIAC (2002–3, 2003–4, 2004–5) and one GLVC (2022–23). (NOTE: program competed as independent, 1987 through 2000). NCAA D2 postseason action includes two national second-place finishes (2021–22 and 2022–23), one national third-place finish (2020–21), and two national fourth-place finishes (2023–24 and 2024–25). Ten individual NCAA championships, including three by Marizel van Jaarsveld (2020–21, 2021–22), plus seven relay championships.
- Tennis – 15 GLVC championships (1988–89, 1990–91, 1991–92, 1993–94, 1996–97, 2002–3, 2004–5, 2005–6, 2014–15, 2016–17, 2018–19, 2020–21, 2021–22, 2022–23, 2023–24). Postseason play includes two D2 national semifinal appearances (2020–21 and 2021–22).
- Track – Outdoor: eight GLVC championships (2002, 2004, 2009 through 2013, 2015). (Note: program competed as independent, 1972 through 1995). Indoor: Two GLVC championships (2009, 2026). Seven individual NCAA championships (4 indoor, 3 outdoor) including two by Vijitha Amaresakara in the javelin (outdoor, 1994 and 1995) and two by Berenice Cleyet-Merle (indoor 800m in 2021, indoor mile in 2022).
- Volleyball – Four GLVC championships (2003, 2009, 2011, 2013). Eleven NCAA D2 tournament appearances (2003, 2007 through 2014, 2019, 2025), including two Elite Eight appearances (2009, 2012).

== Facilities ==
- Athletics and Recreation Center (M/W indoor track & field) – known as the ARC – Built in 2011 as the practice site for the New York Giants prior to their victory in Super Bowl XLVI. Features a 68,000-square-foot (6,300 m^{2}) air-supported dome covering indoor track & field facilities, a training room, baseball batting cages, and an expanded weight room. The adjacent building includes locker rooms for football, men's and women's track and field, softball, and baseball, athletic training facilities, and 20,000 square feet (1,900 m^{2}) of office space for the coaching staffs of football, men's and women's soccer, men's and women's track and field, softball, baseball and men's and women's golf.
- Key Stadium (football, M/W soccer, M/W lacrosse) – Originally built in 1970, Sprinturf playing surface added in 2004, lights added in summer of 2005, seating capacity of 5,500 with standing room only space for approximately 1,500 more. Locker rooms for men's and women's soccer and men's and women's lacrosse are under the home grandstand. Named in honor of benefactor Sheldon Key.
- Nicoson Hall (M/W basketball, wrestling) – Opened in 1960, seating capacity of 4,000 with standing room only space for approximately 1,000 more. Named in honor of long-time basketball coach and Athletic Director Angus Nicoson.
- Dr. Sue Willey Court (volleyball, wrestling) – Opened in 1982, seating capacity of 500. Named in honor of former Athletic Director Sue Willey.
- Ruth Lilly Center Pool (M/W swimming & diving) – Opened in 1982, seating capacity of 300.
- Greyhound Park (baseball) – seating capacity of 750.
- Baumgartner Field (softball) – seating capacity of 300, built in 2012. Named in honor of Mary "Wimp" Baumgartner, who played in the Women's Professional Baseball League during the late 1940s.
- UIndy Tennis Center (M/W tennis) – Seven indoor courts located at the UIndy Tennis Center.
