= Angus Nicoson =

American football, basketball and baseball player and coach

Biographical details
- Born: September 30, 1919
- Died: May 23, 1982 (aged 62)

Playing career

Basketball
- 1938–1942: Indiana Central
- 1942–1944: Indianapolis Pure Oils
- 1944–1945: Indianapolis Kautskys
- 1945–1946: Indianapolis Pure Oils
- 1946–1947: Indianapolis Secos

Coaching career (HC unless noted)

Basketball
- 1947–1976: Indiana Central

Baseball
- 1946–1954: Indiana Central

Football
- 1956–1958: Indiana Central
- 1947–19494: Indiana Central
- 1954: Indiana Central

Administrative career (AD unless noted)
- 1947–1976: Indiana Central

Head coaching record
- Overall: 483–279 (basketball); 128–67–2 (baseball); 21–12 (football)

Accomplishments and honors

Championships
- Football; 2 HCC (1947, 1954)

Angus Jeffers Nicoson (September 30, 1919 – May 23, 1982) was an American football, basketball and baseball player and coach. He served as head basketball coach and athletic director at his alma mater, Indiana Central (today the University of Indianapolis), from 1947 to 1976. During that time, he spent 16 summers coaching the Indiana High School all-star basketball teams in the Indiana-Kentucky All-Star Series (1952 through 1965, 1970, and 1971). He also served as head baseball coach at Indiana Central from 1946 to 1954 and 1956 to 1958, and as head football coach from 1947 through 1949 and for the 1954 season.

== Playing career ==
Nicoson was born in Center Point, Clay County, Indiana, and attended Ashboro High School. He entered Indiana Central in 1938 and graduated in the class of 1942. Three of his four college years overlapped with those of George Crowe (class of 1943), his co-star on basketball and baseball teams coached by Harry Good. Nicoson and Crowe led Indiana Central to Indiana Intercollegiate Conference (IIC) basketball titles in 1940–41 and 1941–42, posting a 33–1 record over the two seasons. Nicoson earned all-IIC honors at guard in both seasons, and was named to the all-state collegiate team in 1941–42. During his senior year, he served as captain of both the basketball team and the baseball team.

In an era in which pro basketball was dominated by independent and/or company-sponsored teams, Nicoson played professionally for the Indianapolis Pure Oils, the Indianapolis Kautskys, and the Indianapolis Secos. The 1942–43 and 1943–44 Pure Oils were among the best pro teams in the Midwest, and participated in the World Professional Basketball Tournament (WPBT) in Chicago at the end of both seasons. Nicoson averaged 13 points per game in WPBT contests.

== Coaching career ==
Throughout his pro basketball career (1942–47), Nicoson was also employed as teacher, coach, and athletic director at Franklin Township High School (today Franklin Central High School) in the Indianapolis suburbs. His basketball teams there posted a 98–28 (.766) record over five seasons, winning two county and three district titles.

After coaching Indiana Central's baseball team in the spring of 1946 and again in the spring of 1947, Nicoson returned to his alma mater full-time in the fall of 1947, to serve as physical education instructor as well as coach of basketball and most other sports. In four seasons (1947–49 and 1954) his duties included coaching football, which he had not played on the collegiate level (because Indiana Central did not have the sport from 1932 through 1945); nevertheless, his four teams included two Hoosier College Conference (HCC) champions. He also continued to serve as head baseball coach in 10 of his next 11 years on the job, posting a .656 winning percentage en route to six HCC pennants. In 1949 he became athletic director, a position he held until his retirement. A master's degree from Indiana University (1952) offered further preparation for his administrative duties. By the late 1950s the college, and its athletic department, had finally grown to the point where he was able to focus his attention primarily on his roles as basketball coach and AD, but as late as the mid-1960s he also coached track and field.

For most of Nicoson's coaching career at Indiana Central, the Greyhounds were members of the HCC and the National Association for Intercollegiate Athletics (NAIA). His basketball teams won eight HCC championships and qualified for the NAIA postseason 15 times. As champions of NAIA District 21, they advanced to the national tournament in Kansas City six times (in 1948–49, 1955–56, 1963–64, 1965–66, 1966–67, and 1968–69). In his last years as head coach, Indiana Central became a member of the National Collegiate Athletic Association (NCAA) and the Indiana Collegiate Conference (ICC), where the competition included Butler, Evansville, and Valparaiso, all of which would be Division I programs by the late 1970s. His Greyhounds held their own against the tougher schedule, but their days of conference titles and postseason play came to an end.

Aside from his record at Indiana Central, Nicoson was also known for his success in coaching Indiana boys high school all-star basketball teams in their annual summer clashes against all-star teams from Kentucky. He coached 31 of 32 games in 16 of the annual home-and-home series (in the years 1952 through 1965, 1970, and 1971), posting a record of 19–12.

Nicoson served as an assistant coach with the 1969 U.S. National Basketball team, which toured Europe and the Soviet Union.

In December 1976, ill health forced Nicoson to step away from his coaching and administrative duties. He made his retirement official in February 1977. At the time, he was in the middle of his 30th season of coaching, and his 483 career victories ranked seventh among active college basketball coaches. He died on May 23, 1982, at the age of 62.

== Honors and legacy ==
Nicoson was recognized as Hoosier College Conference coach of the year seven times and NAIA District 21 coach of the year three times. After many years on the NAIA executive committee, he served as the organization's vice president for 1965–66 and president for 1966–67. Honors included election to the Indiana Basketball Hall of Fame (1977), the Helms Foundation Basketball Hall of Fame (1977), and the University of Indianapolis Athletics Hall of Fame (inaugural class, 1986). He received the National Association of Basketball Coaches (NABC) Honor Award in 1977. The University of Indianapolis basketball arena, built in 1959–60 and still in use today, was renamed Nicoson Hall after his retirement.

Members of the Nicoson family have made their mark on Greyhound athletics across four generations. Angus's son, Dan Nicoson (class of 1968), played football, his grandson, Brent Nicoson (class of 1994), starred on the men's golf team, and his great-grandson, Ben Nicoson (class of 2023), played basketball. Dan Nicoson served as assistant coach in the Greyhound football program, and Brent Nicoson coached the women's golf team to three Division II national championships (2015, 2018, and 2024).

== Head coaching record ==
=== Basketball ===
Record table
Season	Team	Overall	Conference	Standing	Postseason
Indiana Central Greyhounds (Hoosier College Conference) (1947–1970)
1947–48	Indiana Central	16–8	7–3	2nd	
1948–49	Indiana Central	20–9	9–2	1st	NAIA Nationals second round
1949–50	Indiana Central	19–9	10–4	2nd	NAIA District 21 third place
1950–51	Indiana Central	18–7	11–4	1st	
1951–52	Indiana Central	20–10	9–5	2nd	NAIA District 21 finals
1952–53	Indiana Central	17–11	8–5	2nd	NAIA District 21 semifinals
1953–54	Indiana Central	15–8	8–4	2nd (tie)	
1954–55	Indiana Central	10–16	5–7		
1955–56	Indiana Central	23–6	9–3	1st	NAIA Nationals first round
1956–57	Indiana Central	14–10	8–4	2nd (tie)	
1957–58	Indiana Central	15–11	6–4	3rd	
1958–59	Indiana Central	16–8	5–5		
1959–60	Indiana Central	15–10	7–3	1st	NAIA District 21 semifinals
1960–61	Indiana Central	18–8	7–3		NAIA District 21 finals
1961–62	Indiana Central	18–8	6–4		NAIA District 21 semifinals
1962–63	Indiana Central	18–7	8–2	1st	NAIA District 21 semifinals
1963–64	Indiana Central	26–3	9–1	1st	NAIA Nationals second round
1964–65	Indiana Central	17–6	9–1	1st	NAIA District 21 semifinals
1965–66	Indiana Central	17–8	8–2		NAIA Nationals first round
1966–67	Indiana Central	18–10	10–2	1st	NAIA Nationals first round
1967–68	Indiana Central	10–14	6–6		
1968–69	Indiana Central	20–10	7–5	3rd (tie)	NAIA Nationals first round
1969–70	Indiana Central	15–11	6–6		
Indiana Central Greyhounds (Independent) (1970–1972)
1970–71	Indiana Central	12–14			
1971–72	Indiana Central	18–10			NAIA District 21 finals
Indiana Central Greyhounds (Indiana Collegiate Conference) (1972–1977)
1972–73	Indiana Central	15–8	7–5	4th (tie)	
1973–74	Indiana Central	15–11	5–7	5th	
1974–75	Indiana Central	14–10	8–4	2nd (tie)	
1975–76	Indiana Central	13–13	6–6		
1976–77	Indiana Central	1–5 +	0–0 +		+ retired December 1976
Indiana Central:		483-279 (.634)			
Total:		483-279 (.634)			
National champion Postseason invitational champion Conference regular season champion Conference regular season and conference tournament champion Division regular season champion Division regular season and conference tournament champion Conference tournament champion

=== Baseball ===
Record table
Season	Team	Overall	Conference	Standing	Postseason
Indiana Central Greyhounds (Indiana Intercollegiate Conference) (1946–1947)
1946	Indiana Central	9–3			
1947	Indiana Central	10–4–1			
Indiana Central Greyhounds (Hoosier College Conference) (1948–1958)
1948	Indiana Central	11–6			
1949	Indiana Central	11–5		1st	
1950	Indiana Central	10–7			
1951	Indiana Central	10–6–1			
1952	Indiana Central	13–0		1st	
1953	Indiana Central	11–8		1st	
1954	Indiana Central	11–9		1st	
1956	Indiana Central	12–4		1st	
1957	Indiana Central	6–8			
1958	Indiana Central	14–7		1st	
Indiana Central:		128–67–2 (.655)			
Total:		128–67–2 (.655)			
National champion Postseason invitational champion Conference regular season champion Conference regular season and conference tournament champion Division regular season champion Division regular season and conference tournament champion Conference tournament champion

=== Football ===
Year	Team	Overall	Conference	Standing	Bowl/playoffs
Indiana Central Greyhounds (Hoosier College Conference) (1947–1949)
1947	Indiana Central	7–1	6–1	1st	
1948	Indiana Central	4–4	4–2	3rd	
1949	Indiana Central	4–4	3–4	4th	
Indiana Central Greyhounds (Hoosier College Conference) (1954)
1954	Indiana Central	6–3	6–0	1st	
Indiana Central:		21–12	19-7		
Total:		21–12			
National championship Conference title Conference division title or championship game berth
