= 1997 NAIA football season =

American college football season

- Regular season: August–November 1997
- Postseason: November 18–December 20, 1997
- National Championship: Jim Carroll Stadium; Savannah, TN
- Champion: Findlay (4)
- Player of the Year: Bo Hurley (QB, Findlay)

The 1997 NAIA football season, as part of the 1997 college football season in the United States, was the 42nd season of college football sponsored by the NAIA.

The season was played from August to November 1997, culminating in the 1997 NAIA Football National Championship, played this year on December 20, 1997 at Jim Carroll Stadium in Savannah, Tennessee.

Findlay defeated Willamette in the championship game, 14–7, to win their fourth NAIA national title.

== Conference standings ==
1997 Columbia Football Association standings
	Conf.			Overall
Team	W		L	W		L
No. 13 Western Oregon $^	4	–	1	7	–	3
Central Washington	3	–	2	5	–	4
Southern Oregon	3	–	2	5	–	4
Western Washington	3	–	2	5	–	5
Simon Fraser	1	–	4	2	–	7
Humboldt State *	1	–	4	2	–	8
$ – Conference champion; ^ – NAIA playoff participant * – Principally an NCAA member; Rankings from NAIA poll

1997 Frontier Conference football standings
	Conf.			Overall
Team	W		L	W		L
No. 4 Montana Tech $^	6	–	0	10	–	2
Rocky Mountain	3	–	3	4	–	5
Carroll (MT)	2	–	4	4	–	5
Western Montana	1	–	5	1	–	8
$ – Conference champion; ^ – NAIA playoff participant; Rankings from NAIA poll

1997 Heart of America Athletic Conference football standings
	Conf.			Overall
Team	W		L	W		L
No. 10 Benedictine (KS) +^	8	–	1	9	–	2
No. 9 Evangel +^	8	–	1	9	–	2
No. 23 MidAmerica Nazarene	6	–	3	7	–	4
Baker	5	–	4	6	–	4
William Jewell	5	–	4	5	–	5
Graceland	4	–	5	5	–	5
Missouri Valley	4	–	5	5	–	5
Lindenwood	4	–	5	4	–	6
Central Methodist	1	–	8	1	–	9
Culver–Stockton	0	–	9	1	–	9
+ – Conference co-champions; ^ – NAIA playoff participant; Rankings from NAIA poll

1997 Kansas Collegiate Athletic Conference football standings
	Conf.			Overall
Team	W		L	W		L
No. 12 Ottawa +^	7	–	1	9	–	2
No. 15 Southwestern (KS) +^	7	–	1	8	–	3
No. 20 Bethany (KS)	6	–	2	7	–	2
McPherson	4	–	4	6	–	4
Bethel (KS)	4	–	4	5	–	5
Friends	4	–	4	4	–	6
Sterling	2	–	6	3	–	7
Kansas Wesleyan	2	–	6	2	–	7
Tabor	0	–	8	1	–	9
$ – Conference champion; ^ – NAIA playoff participant; Rankings from NAIA poll

1997 Mid-South Conference football standings
	Conf.			Overall
Team	W		L	W		L
No. 11 Campbellsville +^	5	–	1	7	–	3
Georgetown (KY) +	5	–	1	5	–	4
Cumberland (TN)	4	–	2	5	–	4
Cumberland (KY)	3	–	3	5	–	5
Lambuth	2	–	4	4	–	6
Union (KY)	2	–	4	2	–	8
North Greenville	0	–	6	1	–	8
+ – Conference co-champions; ^ – NAIA playoff participant; Rankings from NAIA poll

1997 Mid-States Football Association standings
	Conf.			Overall
Team	W		L	W		L
Mideast League
No. 5 Geneva x^	6	–	0	11	–	2
No. 8 Westminster (PA) ^	5	–	1	9	–	2
No. 21 Walsh	4	–	2	7	–	3
Malone	3	–	3	5	–	5
Tri-State	2	–	4	4	–	6
Tiffin	1	–	4	4	–	7
Urbana	0	–	6	0	–	10
Midwest League
No. 1 Findlay x^	6	–	0	14	–	0
No. 24 Taylor	5	–	1	7	–	3
Olivet Nazarene	4	–	2	7	–	3
St. Ambrose	3	–	3	4	–	6
Iowa Wesleyan	1	–	5	4	–	7
Saint Xavier	1	–	5	1	–	9
Trinity International	1	–	5	1	–	9
x – League champion/co-champions ^ – NAIA playoff participant; Rankings from NAIA poll

1997 Nebraska-Iowa Athletic Conference football standings
	Conf.			Overall
Team	W		L	W		L
No. 7 Doane $^	6	–	0	11	–	1
Hastings	5	–	1	5	–	4
Northwestern (IA)	3	–	3	5	–	5
Nebraska Wesleyan	3	–	3	5	–	5
Dana	2	–	4	4	–	6
Midland	2	–	4	2	–	8
Concordia (NE)	0	–	6	1	–	9
$ – Conference champion; ^ – NAIA playoff participant; Rankings from NAIA poll

1997 North Dakota College Athletic Conference football standings
	Conf.			Overall
Team	W		L	W		L
No. 6 Jamestown $^	6	–	0	10	–	1
No. 16 Minnesota–Crookston ^	4	–	2	7	–	3
No. 22 Dickinson State	4	–	2	6	–	3
Minot State	4	–	2	5	–	4
Valley City State	2	–	4	5	–	5
Mary	1	–	5	4	–	2
Mayville State	0	–	6	0	–	10
$ – Conference champion; ^ – NAIA Division II playoff participant; Rankings from NAIA poll

1997 Northwest Conference football standings
	Conf.			Overall
Team	W		L	W		L
No. 2 Willamette $^	5	–	0	13	–	1
No. 19 Linfield	4	–	1	6	–	3
No. 17 Pacific Lutheran	3	–	2	7	–	2
Lewis & Clark	2	–	3	3	–	6
Whitworth	1	–	4	2	–	7
Puget Sound	0	–	5	2	–	7
$ – Conference champion; ^ – NAIA playoff participant; Rankings from NAIA poll

1997 South Dakota-Iowa Intercollegiate Conference football standings
	Conf.			Overall
Team	W		L	W		L
No. 3 Sioux Falls $^	6	–	0	11	–	2
No. 25 Westmar	5	–	1	8	–	2
Dakota Wesleyan	3	–	3	5	–	5
Huron	3	–	3	4	–	6
Black Hills State	2	–	4	3	–	6
Dakota State	1	–	5	2	–	8
South Dakota Tech	1	–	5	1	–	9
$ – Conference champion; ^ – NAIA playoff participant; Rankings from NAIA poll

1997 NAIA independents football records
	Conf.			Overall
Team	W		L	W		L
No. 14 McKendree ^		–		8	–	2
No. 18 Clinch Valley		–		6	–	3
Peru State		–		6	–	4
NW Oklahoma State		–		5	–	5
Azusa Pacific		–		4	–	5
Eastern Oregon		–		4	–	6
^ – NAIA playoff participant; Rankings from NAIA poll

== Conference champions ==
Conference	Champion	Record
Columbia	Western Oregon; Central Washington	3–1
Frontier	Montana Tech	6–0
Heart of America	Benedictine; Evangel	8–1
Kansas	Ottawa; Southwestern (KS)	7–1
Mid-South	Campbellsville; Georgetown (KY)	5–1
Mid-States	Mideast Division: Geneva; Midwest Division: Findlay	6–0; 6–0
Nebraska-Iowa	Doane	6–0
North Dakota	Jamestown	6–0
South Dakota-Iowa	Sioux Falls	—

== Season events ==
The 1997 Linfield vs. Willamette football game was played between the Linfield Wildcats and the Willamette Bearcats played on October 18, 1997. The game was played at McCulloch Stadium in Salem, Oregon. Willamette won the game by a score of 27 to 0. During the game, Liz Heaston became the first woman to not only play but also to score in a college football game.

== Postseason ==
First Round; November 18, 1997; Campus sites
10	Benedictine (KS)	30
6	Jamestown	55
12	Ottawa	14
3	Sioux Falls	57
16	Minnesota–Crookston	10
4	Montana Tech	51
13	Western Oregon	20
2	Willamette	26
15	Southwestern (KS)	28
7	Doane	53
14	McKendree	6
9	Evangel	46
11	Campbellsville	14
5	Geneva	34
8	Westminster (PA)	0
1	Findlay	40

Quarterfinals; December 6, 1997; Campus sites
6	Jamestown	6
3	Sioux Falls	29
4	Montana Tech	24
2	Willamette	50
7	Doane	59
9	Evangel	20
5	Geneva	7
1	Findlay	28

Semifinals; December 13, 1997; Campus sites
3	Sioux Falls	7
2	Willamette	17
7	Doane	25
1	Findlay	26

Championship; December 20, 1997; Savannah, TN
2	Willamette	7
1	Findlay	14

== See also ==
- 1997 NCAA Division I-A football season
- 1997 NCAA Division I-AA football season
- 1997 NCAA Division II football season
- 1997 NCAA Division III football season
