= Dick Nyers =

American football player and coach (born 1934)

No. 18, 21
- Positions: Defensive back, halfback

Personal information
- Born: October 8, 1934 (age 92); Indianapolis, Indiana, U.S.
- Listed height: 5 ft 11 in (1.80 m)
- Listed weight: 177 lb (80 kg)

Career information
- High school: Emmerich Manual (IN)
- College: Indianapolis

Career history

Playing
- Baltimore Colts (1956–1957)

Coaching
- Indiana Central (1970–1971) Head coach

Career statistics
- Games played: 12
- Stats at Pro Football Reference

Charles Richard Nyers (born October 8, 1934) is an American former professional football player and college coach. He played for the Baltimore Colts of the National Football League (NFL), after playing collegiately at Indiana Central (today the University of Indianapolis). Nyers served as the head football coach at his alma mater from 1970 to 1971, compiling a record of 9–11. He was inducted into the Indiana Football Hall of Fame in 2014.

== Head coaching record ==
Year	Team	Overall	Conference	Standing	Bowl/playoffs
Indiana Central Greyhounds (NCAA College Division independent) (1970)
1970	Indiana Central	3–6			
Indiana Central Greyhounds (Indiana Collegiate Conference) (1971)
1971	Indiana Central	6–5	1–2	4th	
Indiana Central:		9–11	1–2		
Total:		9–11			
