= Hoosier–Buckeye Conference =

Defunct American collegiate athletic conference

- Association: NAIA
- Founded: 1947
- Folded: 1986
- Sports fielded: 9
- No. of teams: 7 (most years), 13 (total)

The Hoosier–Buckeye Conference was a college athletic conference founded in 1947 as the Hoosier College Conference (HCC) by eight members of the Indiana Intercollegiate Conference. After consisting solely of colleges in Indiana for 24 years, the conference changed its name in 1971 to the Hoosier-Buckeye Collegiate Conference (HBCC) to reflect the admission of schools in Ohio. It existed for another 15 years in its rebranded form.

Throughout its history, the conference always consisted exclusively of private schools. With the exception of founding member Rose Polytechnic (today Rose-Hulman) in the years 1947–50, all members were affiliated with various Protestant Christian denominations.

HCC and HBCC members competed in the National Association for Intercollegiate Athletics (NAIA).

== HCC history ==
In March 1947, Anderson (Indiana) sports writer "Red" Haven broke the news that the Hoosier College Conference was being formed, noting "the project has the blessings of most of the church-supported colleges in Indiana." In late April, a press release confirmed that Anderson College (today Anderson University), Canterbury College, Earlham College, Franklin College, Indiana Central (today the University of Indianapolis), and Manchester College (today Manchester University) had formed the league, pending the approval of their trustees. Rose Polytechnic (today Rose-Hulman Institute of Technology) joined the conference three months later, giving it eight members when competition began in fall 1947. All eight had previously competed in the Indiana Intercollegiate Conference.

The HCC constitution prohibited members from offering athletic scholarships. All were required to sponsor teams in football, basketball, baseball, and track. Championship events were also held in cross country, tennis, and golf, but those sports were not mandatory. Initially, HCC members were required to schedule conference opponents for at least four football games, ten basketball games, seven baseball games, and three track meets to be eligible for the annual championships in those sports. The need for a more centralized, balanced approach to scheduling became apparent right away, when Indiana Central won what would have been a three-way tie for the 1947 HCC football title by playing one more game than its rivals: Indiana Central beat Hanover, which beat Franklin, which beat Indiana Central, in each case their only conference loss, but Indiana Central (6–1) scheduled everyone in the HCC, while Franklin (5–1) and Hanover (5–1) did not. The HCC ultimately scheduled a single round-robin in football, and a double round-robin in basketball and baseball.

The HCC experienced several changes in its first years of operation. After Taylor University became the league's ninth member in 1949, Rose Poly left the conference in 1950, Canterbury closed its doors in 1951, and Earlham withdrew from the league in 1957, reducing the lineup to just six schools. It remained the same for nearly a decade. Earlham was readmitted to the league in 1965, but because of existing scheduling commitments, the Quakers did not return to conference play until 1966–67, and did not have a full HCC schedule in football until 1968.

Throughout the 1950s and 1960s, HCC teams shared NAIA District 21 with two of Indiana's larger public universities--Ball State and Indiana State—both of which held dual membership in the NCAA and NAIA while competing in the Indiana Collegiate Conference. As a result, the best HCC teams usually did not get past the district level in postseason play. In basketball, the conference's signature sport, its teams beat the odds to win the district tournament 11 times in 24 years, and earn a spot in the NAIA's national tournament (held annually in Kansas City). Indiana Central led the way, advancing in 1948–49, 1955–56, 1963–64, 1965–66, 1966–67, and 1968–69, all under head coach Angus Nicoson, who was named NAIA national coach of the year in 1966–67. Hanover advanced to the national tournament in 1967–68 and 1969–70, led by guard Steve Wilson, who went on to play professionally for the ABA's Denver Rockets. Other HCC champions making it to the national tourney included Anderson in 1957–58 and 1960–61, and Earlham in 1970–71.

In football, Indiana Central dominated the conference in the 1950s. Halfback Dick Nyers, the only HCC athlete ever to play in the NFL, led the Greyhounds to an undefeated (8–0) season in 1953 and three consecutive conference titles (1953, 1954, 1955) before going on to a brief career with the Baltimore Colts. Taylor and Anderson dominated the gridiron in the 1960s, each winning four HCC titles, including three in a row by the Trojans (1962, 1963, 1964) and three in a row by the Ravens (1968, 1969, 1970). In 1970 Anderson became the only HCC member ever to qualify for the NAIA football playoffs, after the association split into two divisions for the sport and the HCC became a member of the NAIA Division II.

In baseball, Anderson dominated the HCC in the 1960s under the leadership of former Brooklyn Dodgers pitcher Carl Erskine, who coached the Ravens to four conference titles in twelve years. Anderson qualified for the 1965 NAIA World Series and went 0–2 in the double-elimination tournament. Taylor made the 1969 NAIA World Series and finished 1–2. HCC baseball players who went on to play professional baseball included Don Miles, a four-sport athlete at Indiana Central as a freshman in 1954–55, who dropped out midway through his sophomore year to sign with the Brooklyn Dodgers. He saw action briefly as an outfielder with the Dodgers (in Los Angeles) in 1958.

The HCC eventually added wrestling as an 8th conference sport, with league competition starting in the 1964–65 season. Indiana Central won five of the first six HCC wrestling titles.

== HBCC history ==
The transformation of the HCC into the HBCC came after Franklin and Indiana Central quit the league at the end of the 1969–70 academic year. For the five remaining members, expansion efforts turned to Ohio. By autumn 1970 they identified Defiance College, Bluffton College (today Bluffton University), Findlay College (today the University of Findlay), and Wilmington College (today Wilmington University) as likely additions in the next 2–4 years. Their incorporation occurred much faster than anticipated, and all four were in the conference in time for the 1971–72 academic year.

In basketball, the HBCC sent 12 teams to the NAIA national tournament in 15 years, including three seasons in which two HBCC teams made the Kansas City bracket. Hanover led the way with five national qualifiers, in 1972–73, 1973–74, 1979–80, 1980–81, and 1981–82. Others included Findlay in 1971–72 and 1985–86, Defiance in 1972–73 and 1979–80, and Franklin in 1975–76, 1977–78, and 1979–80.

In football, Findlay emerged as the dominant program, winning or sharing 9 of 15 conference championships. Hanover also fielded strong teams, winning or sharing six HBCC titles, followed by Anderson, with three. Like the HCC in its final seasons, the HBCC competed in the NAIA Division II for football, which eventually expanded its postseason bracket from four teams to eight. Findlay made the playoffs five times (1978, 1979, 1983, 1984, 1985), Hanover four times (1974, 1975, 1980 and 1984), Wilmington three times (1980, 1982, and 1983), and Anderson once (1981). Under the leadership of head coach Dick Strahm, Findlay made it to the NAIA Division II championship game in 1978 and 1979, and won the 1979 national championship.

Anderson qualified for the 1984 NAIA World Series, the only baseball program to do so in the 15 seasons of HBCC play. The Ravens went 1–2 in the double-elimination tournament.

The HBCC remained a stable 9-team league for a dozen seasons, then began to break up against the wishes of its Ohio members, after the Indiana members one by one quit the conference. Taylor left in 1983, then Earlham in 1984. During 1985 Manchester announced it would leave the league at the end of the 1985–86 academic year. The last straw came early in December 1985, when Anderson announced it, too, would quit the HBCC. At that point the five remaining members—Hanover and the four Ohio schools—accepted the reality that the conference would cease to exist the following summer.

== Aftermath ==
The common athletic history and rivalries forged in the conference lived on, at least for 10 of the 13 former HCC/HBCC members. Except for Indianapolis (formerly Indiana Central) and Findlay, both of which moved to NCAA Division II, and the defunct Canterbury, the rest were reunited after 1987 as members of NCAA Division III in the Indiana Collegiate Athletic Conference (ICAC), later rebranded as the Heartland Collegiate Athletic Conference (HCAC). Like the HCC/HBCC, the conference was founded as an Indiana-only league and changed its name after expanding to include schools from Ohio. Seven of the ten remain members of the HCAC today. As of 2024–25, only Taylor and Defiance compete as members of the NAIA.

== Members ==
=== Final members ===
The HBCC had seven members in its final season. All were private schools:

Institution	Location	Founded	Affiliation	Nickname	Joined	Left
Anderson University	Anderson, Indiana	1917	Church of God (Anderson)	Ravens	1947	1986
Bluffton University	Bluffton, Ohio	1899	Mennonite	Beavers	1971	1986
Defiance College	Defiance, Ohio	1850	United Church of Christ	Yellow Jackets	1971	1986
University of Findlay	Findlay, Ohio	1882	Churches of God (Winebrenner)	Oilers	1971	1986
Hanover College	Hanover, Indiana	1827	Presbyterian	Panthers	1947	1986
Manchester University	North Manchester, Indiana	1860	Church of the Brethren	Spartans	1947	1986
Wilmington College	Wilmington, Ohio	1870	Society of Friends	Quakers	1971	1986

=== Former members ===
Six former members of the HCC were not in the HBCC at the time it disbanded. All were private schools:

Institution	Location	Founded	Affiliation	Nickname	Joined	Left
Canterbury College	Danville, Indiana	1876	Episcopal	Knights	1947	1951
Earlham College	Richmond, Indiana	1847	Society of Friends	Quakers	1947; 1966	1957; 1984
Franklin College	Franklin, Indiana	1834	Baptist	Grizzlies	1947	1970
Indiana Central University+	Indianapolis, Indiana	1902	United Methodist	Greyhounds	1947	1970
Rose-Hulman Institute of Technology	Terre Haute, Indiana	1874	Nonsectarian	Fightin' Engineers	1947	1950
Taylor University	Upland, Indiana	1846	Interdenominational	Trojans	1949	1983

+ renamed University of Indianapolis in 1986

=== Membership timeline ===
Full member (all sports)

== Football champions ==
=== Hoosier College Conference ===
- 1947 – Indiana Central
- 1948 – Anderson (IN) and Hanover
- 1949 – Hanover
- 1950 – Canterbury
- 1951 – Hanover
- 1952 – Hanover
- 1953 – Indiana Central
- 1954 – Indiana Central
- 1955 – Indiana Central
- 1956 – Hanover
- 1957 – Anderson (IN) and Hanover
- 1958 – Hanover
- 1959 – Anderson (IN)
- 1960 – Indiana Central
- 1961 – Anderson (IN)
- 1962 – Taylor
- 1963 – Taylor
- 1964 – Taylor
- 1965 – Anderson (IN)
- 1966 – Franklin (IN) and Manchester (IN)
- 1967 – Taylor
- 1968 – Anderson (IN) and Manchester (IN)
- 1969 – Anderson (IN)
- 1970 – Anderson (IN) and Earlham

=== Hoosier–Buckeye Conference ===
- 1971 – Anderson (IN) and Findlay
- 1972 – Bluffton
- 1973 – Hanover
- 1974 – Hanover
- 1975 – Hanover
- 1976 – Defiance, Findlay, and Hanover
- 1977 – Defiance and Findlay
- 1978 – Findlay
- 1979 – Findlay and Hanover
- 1980 – Anderson (IN), Hanover, and Wilmington (OH)
- 1981 – Anderson (IN)
- 1982 – Findlay and Wilmington (OH)
- 1983 – Findlay and Wilmington (OH)
- 1984 – Findlay
- 1985 – Findlay

== Yearly football standings ==
1947 Hoosier Conference football standings
	Conf.					Overall
Team	W		L		T	W		L		T
Indiana Central $	6	–	1	–	0	7	–	1	–	0
Hanover	5	–	1	–	0	7	–	1	–	0
Franklin (IN)	5	–	1	–	0	6	–	2	–	0
Manchester (IN)	2	–	3	–	1	2	–	5	–	1
Earlham	2	–	3	–	0	3	–	5	–	0
Canterbury	1	–	4	–	0	1	–	6	–	1
Anderson (IN)	0	–	4	–	1	1	–	5	–	2
Rose Poly	0	–	4	–	0	0	–	7	–	1
$ – Conference champion

1948 Hoosier Conference football standings
	Conf.					Overall
Team	W		L		T	W		L		T
Hanover +	6	–	0	–	0	6	–	2	–	0
Anderson (IN) +	5	–	0	–	0	6	–	2	–	0
Indiana Central	4	–	2	–	0	4	–	4	–	0
Canterbury	1	–	3	–	2	2	–	4	–	2
Rose Poly	1	–	3	–	1	3	–	3	–	1
Manchester (IN)	1	–	3	–	1	1	–	6	–	1
Franklin (IN)	1	–	4	–	2	1	–	5	–	2
Earlham	0	–	4	–	0	0	–	8	–	0
+ – Conference co-champions

1949 Hoosier Conference football standings
	Conf.					Overall
Team	W		L		T	W		L		T
Hanover $	6	–	0	–	0	8	–	1	–	0
Anderson (IN)	5	–	1	–	0	6	–	2	–	0
Taylor	2	–	1	–	2	4	–	3	–	2
Indiana Central	3	–	4	–	0	4	–	4	–	0
Franklin (IN)	2	–	3	–	1	3	–	4	–	1
Canterbury	2	–	3	–	1	2	–	5	–	1
Earlham	2	–	3	–	0	3	–	6	–	0
Rose Poly	1	–	3	–	1	4	–	3	–	1
Manchester (IN)	0	–	5	–	1	1	–	6	–	1
$ – Conference champion

1950 Hoosier Conference football standings
	Conf.					Overall
Team	W		L		T	W		L		T
Canterbury $	6	–	0	–	0	8	–	0	–	0
Anderson (IN)	4	–	1	–	1	4	–	3	–	2
Hanover	3	–	2	–	0	3	–	5	–	1
Taylor	3	–	2	–	0	5	–	4	–	0
Indiana Central	2	–	4	–	1	3	–	5	–	1
Manchester (IN)	2	–	4	–	0	3	–	6	–	0
Earlham	1	–	4	–	0	3	–	5	–	0
Franklin (IN)	1	–	5	–	0	2	–	7	–	0
$ – Conference champion

1951 Hoosier Conference football standings
	Conf.					Overall
Team	W		L		T	W		L		T
Hanover $	6	–	0	–	0	6	–	3	–	0
Indiana Central	4	–	2	–	0	5	–	3	–	0
Earlham	3	–	3	–	0	4	–	4	–	0
Manchester (IN)	3	–	3	–	0	4	–	4	–	0
Taylor	3	–	3	–	0	3	–	5	–	0
Franklin (IN)	1	–	5	–	0	2	–	6	–	0
Anderson (IN)	1	–	5	–	0	1	–	7	–	0
$ – Conference champion

1952 Hoosier Conference football standings
	Conf.					Overall
Team	W		L		T	W		L		T
Hanover $	6	–	0	–	0	6	–	1	–	2
Earlham	4	–	2	–	0	6	–	2	–	0
Franklin (IN)	4	–	2	–	0	5	–	3	–	0
Indiana Central	3	–	3	–	0	5	–	3	–	0
Anderson (IN)	2	–	4	–	0	3	–	5	–	1
Manchester (IN)	2	–	4	–	0	4	–	4	–	0
Taylor	0	–	6	–	0	0	–	9	–	0
$ – Conference champion

1953 Hoosier Conference football standings
	Conf.					Overall
Team	W		L		T	W		L		T
Indiana Central $	6	–	0	–	0	8	–	0	–	0
Earlham	4	–	2	–	0	6	–	2	–	0
Hanover	4	–	2	–	0	4	–	4	–	1
Anderson (IN)	3	–	3	–	0	3	–	5	–	0
Taylor	3	–	3	–	0	4	–	4	–	0
Franklin (IN)	1	–	5	–	0	1	–	7	–	0
Manchester (IN)	0	–	6	–	0	0	–	9	–	0
$ – Conference champion

1954 Hoosier Conference football standings
	Conf.					Overall
Team	W		L		T	W		L		T
Indiana Central $	6	–	0	–	0	6	–	3	–	0
Taylor	4	–	2	–	0	6	–	2	–	0
Hanover	4	–	2	–	0	4	–	5	–	0
Franklin (IN)	2	–	4	–	0	3	–	4	–	1
Anderson (IN)	2	–	4	–	0	2	–	7	–	0
Manchester (IN)	2	–	4	–	0	2	–	7	–	0
Earlham	1	–	5	–	0	1	–	7	–	0
$ – Conference champion

1955 Hoosier Conference football standings
	Conf.					Overall
Team	W		L		T	W		L		T
Indiana Central $	4	–	1	–	1	5	–	3	–	1
Franklin (IN)	4	–	2	–	0	6	–	3	–	0
Hanover	4	–	2	–	0	5	–	4	–	0
Anderson (IN)	3	–	3	–	0	4	–	5	–	0
Earlham	3	–	3	–	0	3	–	6	–	0
Manchester (IN)	1	–	4	–	1	2	–	6	–	1
Taylor	1	–	5	–	0	2	–	6	–	0
$ – Conference champion

1956 Hoosier Conference football standings
	Conf.					Overall
Team	W		L		T	W		L		T
Hanover $	6	–	0	–	0	8	–	1	–	0
Anderson (IN)	5	–	1	–	0	6	–	2	–	0
Indiana Central	4	–	2	–	0	4	–	5	–	0
Franklin (IN)	3	–	3	–	0	5	–	4	–	0
Manchester (IN)	2	–	4	–	0	3	–	6	–	0
Taylor	1	–	5	–	0	3	–	6	–	0
Earlham	0	–	6	–	0	1	–	7	–	0
$ – Conference champion

1957 Hoosier Conference football standings
	Conf.					Overall
Team	W		L		T	W		L		T
Hanover +	4	–	1	–	0	8	–	1	–	0
Anderson (IN) +	4	–	1	–	0	7	–	1	–	0
Taylor	3	–	1	–	1	7	–	1	–	1
Indiana Central	2	–	3	–	0	3	–	6	–	1
Franklin (IN)	1	–	4	–	0	4	–	5	–	0
Manchester (IN)	0	–	4	–	1	2	–	6	–	1
+ – Conference co-champions

1958 Hoosier Conference football standings
	Conf.					Overall
Team	W		L		T	W		L		T
Hanover $	5	–	0	–	0	5	–	4	–	0
Anderson (IN)	4	–	1	–	0	8	–	1	–	0
Indiana Central	2	–	3	–	0	3	–	6	–	0
Taylor	2	–	3	–	0	3	–	6	–	0
Manchester (IN)	1	–	4	–	0	3	–	6	–	0
Franklin (IN)	1	–	4	–	0	2	–	6	–	0
+ – Conference co-champions

1959 Hoosier Conference football standings
	Conf.					Overall
Team	W		L		T	W		L		T
Anderson (IN) $	5	–	0	–	0	7	–	1	–	0
Taylor	3	–	2	–	0	6	–	3	–	0
Franklin (IN)	3	–	2	–	0	5	–	4	–	0
Hanover	2	–	3	–	0	2	–	6	–	1
Indiana Central	1	–	3	–	1	3	–	5	–	1
Manchester (IN)	0	–	4	–	1	3	–	5	–	1
+ – Conference co-champions

1960 Hoosier Conference football standings
	Conf.					Overall
Team	W		L		T	W		L		T
Indiana Central $	4	–	1	–	0	6	–	3	–	0
Anderson (IN)	3	–	2	–	0	6	–	2	–	0
Franklin (IN)	3	–	2	–	0	5	–	4	–	0
Manchester (IN)	2	–	2	–	0	3	–	5	–	0
Hanover	2	–	2	–	0	2	–	6	–	0
Taylor	0	–	5	–	0	2	–	7	–	0
+ – Conference co-champions

1961 Hoosier Conference football standings
	Conf.					Overall
Team	W		L		T	W		L		T
Taylor +	4	–	1	–	0	8	–	1	–	0
Anderson (IN) +	4	–	1	–	0	4	–	4	–	0
Hanover	3	–	2	–	0	3	–	6	–	0
Indiana Central	2	–	3	–	0	4	–	5	–	0
Franklin (IN)	1	–	4	–	0	3	–	6	–	0
Manchester (IN)	1	–	4	–	0	1	–	8	–	0
+ – Conference co-champions

1962 Hoosier Conference football standings
	Conf.					Overall
Team	W		L		T	W		L		T
Taylor $	5	–	0	–	0	6	–	3	–	0
Anderson (IN)	3	–	1	–	1	5	–	2	–	1
Franklin (IN)	2	–	1	–	2	3	–	4	–	2
Manchester (IN)	2	–	3	–	0	2	–	6	–	0
Indiana Central	1	–	3	–	1	1	–	6	–	2
Hanover	0	–	5	–	0	0	–	9	–	0
$ – Conference champion

1963 Hoosier Conference football standings
	Conf.					Overall
Team	W		L		T	W		L		T
Taylor $	4	–	0	–	1	5	–	2	–	1
Franklin (IN)	3	–	2	–	0	6	–	3	–	0
Manchester (IN)	3	–	2	–	0	4	–	4	–	0
Anderson (IN)	2	–	2	–	1	2	–	5	–	1
Indiana Central	2	–	3	–	0	3	–	6	–	0
Hanover	0	–	5	–	0	0	–	9	–	0
$ – Conference champion

1964 Hoosier Conference football standings
	Conf.					Overall
Team	W		L		T	W		L		T
Taylor $	5	–	0	–	0	5	–	4	–	0
Franklin (IN)	4	–	1	–	0	6	–	3	–	0
Indiana Central	2	–	3	–	0	3	–	6	–	0
Manchester (IN)	2	–	3	–	0	3	–	6	–	0
Anderson (IN)	1	–	4	–	0	2	–	7	–	0
Hanover	1	–	4	–	0	2	–	7	–	0
$ – Conference champion

1965 Hoosier Conference football standings
	Conf.					Overall
Team	W		L		T	W		L		T
Anderson (IN) $	4	–	1	–	0	4	–	5	–	0
Taylor	3	–	1	–	1	3	–	5	–	1
Indiana Central	3	–	2	–	0	6	–	3	–	0
Franklin (IN)	2	–	2	–	1	3	–	5	–	1
Manchester (IN)	0	–	3	–	2	2	–	5	–	2
Hanover	1	–	4	–	0	1	–	8	–	0
$ – Conference champion

1966 Hoosier Conference football standings
	Conf.					Overall
Team	W		L		T	W		L		T
Manchester (IN) +	4	–	1	–	0	5	–	4	–	0
Franklin (IN) +	4	–	1	–	0	4	–	5	–	0
Taylor	3	–	2	–	0	5	–	3	–	0
Hanover	3	–	2	–	0	4	–	5	–	0
Anderson (IN)	1	–	4	–	0	1	–	7	–	0
Indiana Central	0	–	5	–	0	1	–	8	–	0
+ – Conference co-champions

1967 Hoosier Conference football standings
	Conf.					Overall
Team	W		L		T	W		L		T
Taylor $	5	–	1	–	0	7	–	2	–	0
Franklin (IN)	4	–	2	–	0	6	–	3	–	0
Hanover	3	–	2	–	1	4	–	4	–	1
Manchester (IN)	3	–	3	–	0	3	–	5	–	0
Earlham	2	–	2	–	1	3	–	3	–	1
Anderson (IN)	1	–	4	–	0	1	–	7	–	0
Indiana Central	1	–	5	–	0	1	–	7	–	1
$ – Conference champion

1968 Hoosier Conference football standings
	Conf.					Overall
Team	W		L		T	W		L		T
Manchester (IN) +	5	–	1	–	0	7	–	1	–	0
Anderson (IN) +	5	–	1	–	0	6	–	3	–	0
Hanover	4	–	2	–	0	5	–	4	–	0
Earlham	3	–	3	–	0	4	–	3	–	1
Taylor	2	–	4	–	0	3	–	5	–	1
Indiana Central	1	–	5	–	0	2	–	6	–	0
Franklin (IN)	1	–	5	–	0	2	–	8	–	0
+ – Conference co-champions

1969 Hoosier Conference football standings
	Conf.					Overall
Team	W		L		T	W		L		T
Anderson (IN) $	6	–	0	–	0	8	–	1	–	0
Hanover	4	–	2	–	0	6	–	3	–	0
Earlham	3	–	3	–	0	5	–	4	–	0
Franklin (IN)	3	–	3	–	0	4	–	4	–	1
Manchester (IN)	2	–	4	–	0	3	–	5	–	0
Taylor	2	–	4	–	0	3	–	6	–	0
Indiana Central	1	–	5	–	0	1	–	8	–	0
$ – Conference champion

1970 Hoosier Conference football standings
	Conf.					Overall
Team	W		L		T	W		L		T
No. 2 Anderson (IN) +^	3	–	1	–	0	9	–	2	–	0
Earlham +	3	–	1	–	0	6	–	3	–	0
Manchester (IN)	2	–	2	–	0	4	–	4	–	0
Taylor	1	–	3	–	0	6	–	4	–	0
Hanover	1	–	3	–	0	2	–	7	–	0
+ – Conference co-champions; ^ – NAIA Division II playoff participant; Rankings from NAIA Division II poll

1971 Hoosier–Buckeye Conference football standings
	Conf.					Overall
Team	W		L		T	W		L		T
No. 9 Anderson (IN) +	5	–	1	–	0	7	–	2	–	0
No. 14 Findlay +	5	–	1	–	0	6	–	4	–	0
Earlham	3	–	3	–	0	6	–	3	–	0
Wilmington (OH)	3	–	3	–	0	6	–	3	–	0
Taylor	3	–	3	–	0	4	–	5	–	1
Defiance	2	–	4	–	0	5	–	4	–	0
Manchester (IN)	2	–	4	–	0	4	–	5	–	0
Bluffton	2	–	4	–	0	3	–	6	–	0
Hanover	2	–	4	–	0	3	–	6	–	0
+ – Conference co-champions; Rankings from NAIA Division II poll

1972 Hoosier–Buckeye Conference football standings
	Conf.					Overall
Team	W		L		T	W		L		T
Bluffton $	5	–	2	–	0	5	–	4	–	0
Findlay	4	–	2	–	1	5	–	3	–	1
Manchester (IN)	4	–	3	–	0	5	–	5	–	0
Wilmington (OH)	4	–	3	–	0	5	–	4	–	0
Taylor	3	–	2	–	2	3	–	4	–	2
Defiance	3	–	4	–	0	5	–	4	–	0
Anderson (IN)	2	–	4	–	1	4	–	4	–	1
Hanover	2	–	5	–	0	4	–	5	–	0
Earlham	1	–	6	–	0	2	–	8	–	0
$ – Conference champion

1973 Hoosier–Buckeye Conference football standings
	Conf.					Overall
Team	W		L		T	W		L		T
No. 13 Hanover $	6	–	0	–	0	8	–	1	–	0
No. 19 Defiance	5	–	2	–	0	7	–	2	–	0
Taylor	4	–	2	–	1	4	–	4	–	1
Bluffton	4	–	3	–	0	4	–	5	–	0
Wilmington (OH)	4	–	3	–	0	5	–	3	–	0
Earlham	3	–	4	–	0	4	–	6	–	0
Anderson (IN)	2	–	5	–	0	3	–	6	–	0
Findlay	1	–	6	–	0	3	–	7	–	0
Manchester (IN)	0	–	6	–	1	1	–	7	–	1
$ – Conference champion; Rankings from NAIA Division II poll

1974 Hoosier–Buckeye Conference football standings
	Conf.					Overall
Team	W		L		T	W		L		T
No. 4 Hanover $^	7	–	0	–	0	9	–	1	–	0
Bluffton	4	–	2	–	1	4	–	4	–	1
Wilmington (OH)	4	–	3	–	0	5	–	3	–	0
Defiance	4	–	3	–	0	5	–	5	–	0
Taylor	3	–	3	–	1	4	–	4	–	1
Anderson (IN)	3	–	4	–	0	3	–	6	–	1
Findlay	3	–	4	–	0	3	–	7	–	0
Manchester (IN)	1	–	6	–	0	1	–	8	–	0
Earlham	0	–	7	–	0	0	–	9	–	0
$ – Conference champion; ^ – NAIA Division II playoff participant; Rankings from NAIA Division II poll

1975 Hoosier–Buckeye Conference football standings
	Conf.					Overall
Team	W		L		T	W		L		T
No. 4 Hanover $^	8	–	0	–	0	9	–	1	–	0
No. 12 Wilmington (OH)	5	–	2	–	1	6	–	2	–	1
Bluffton	5	–	2	–	1	5	–	3	–	1
Taylor	5	–	3	–	0	6	–	3	–	0
Defiance	3	–	5	–	0	4	–	5	–	0
Earlham	2	–	6	–	0	2	–	7	–	0
Anderson (IN)	2	–	6	–	0	2	–	7	–	0
Manchester (IN)	2	–	6	–	0	2	–	7	–	0
Findlay	2	–	6	–	0	2	–	8	–	0
$ – Conference champion; ^ – NAIA Division II playoff participant.; Rankings from NAIA Division II poll

1976 Hoosier–Buckeye Conference football standings
	Conf.					Overall
Team	W		L		T	W		L		T
Defiance +	6	–	2	–	0	6	–	3	–	0
Findlay +	6	–	2	–	0	6	–	3	–	0
Hanover +	6	–	2	–	0	6	–	3	–	0
Wilmington (OH)	5	–	2	–	1	5	–	3	–	1
Taylor	4	–	4	–	0	5	–	4	–	0
Manchester (IN)	4	–	4	–	0	4	–	5	–	0
Anderson (IN)	3	–	5	–	0	3	–	6	–	0
Bluffton	1	–	7	–	0	1	–	8	–	0
Earlham	0	–	7	–	1	1	–	7	–	1
+ – Conference co-champions

1977 Hoosier–Buckeye Conference football standings
	Conf.					Overall
Team	W		L		T	W		L		T
Defiance +	6	–	1	–	1	6	–	2	–	1
Findlay +	6	–	1	–	1	6	–	2	–	1
Hanover	6	–	2	–	0	7	–	2	–	0
Wilmington (OH)	6	–	2	–	0	6	–	3	–	0
Taylor	4	–	4	–	0	5	–	4	–	0
Anderson (IN)	3	–	5	–	0	3	–	6	–	0
Bluffton	2	–	6	–	0	3	–	6	–	0
Earlham	2	–	6	–	0	3	–	6	–	0
Manchester (IN)	0	–	8	–	0	0	–	9	–	0
+ – Conference co-champions

1978 Hoosier–Buckeye Conference football standings
	Conf.					Overall
Team	W		L		T	W		L		T
No. 2 Findlay $^	8	–	0	–	0	11	–	1	–	0
Hanover	6	–	2	–	0	6	–	2	–	1
Defiance	5	–	3	–	0	5	–	4	–	0
Wilmington (OH)	4	–	4	–	0	5	–	4	–	0
Anderson (IN)	4	–	4	–	0	5	–	4	–	0
Manchester (IN)	4	–	4	–	0	4	–	5	–	0
Bluffton	2	–	6	–	0	2	–	7	–	0
Taylor	2	–	6	–	0	2	–	7	–	0
Earlham	1	–	7	–	0	2	–	7	–	0
$ – Conference champion; ^ – NAIA Division II playoff participant; Rankings from NAIA Division II poll

1979 Hoosier–Buckeye Conference football standings
	Conf.					Overall
Team	W		L		T	W		L		T
No. 1 Findlay +^	7	–	1	–	0	10	–	1	–	1
No. 10 Hanover +	7	–	1	–	0	7	–	2	–	0
No. 16 Anderson (IN)	6	–	2	–	0	7	–	2	–	0
Wilmington (OH)	5	–	3	–	0	5	–	4	–	0
Manchester (IN)	4	–	4	–	0	4	–	5	–	0
Bluffton	3	–	5	–	0	3	–	6	–	0
Defiance	3	–	5	–	0	3	–	6	–	0
Taylor	1	–	7	–	0	1	–	8	–	0
Earlham	0	–	8	–	0	0	–	9	–	0
+ – Conference co-champions; ^ – NAIA Division II playoff participant; Rankings from NAIA Division II poll

1980 Hoosier–Buckeye Conference football standings
	Conf.					Overall
Team	W		L		T	W		L		T
No. 9 Anderson (IN) +	7	–	1	–	0	8	–	1	–	0
No. 2 Wilmington (OH) +^	7	–	1	–	0	10	–	2	–	0
No. 5 Hanover +^	7	–	1	–	0	8	–	2	–	0
Findlay	5	–	3	–	0	5	–	4	–	0
Defiance	4	–	4	–	0	4	–	5	–	0
Earlham	2	–	6	–	0	3	–	6	–	0
Bluffton	2	–	6	–	0	2	–	6	–	1
Taylor	2	–	6	–	0	2	–	7	–	0
Manchester (IN)	0	–	8	–	0	0	–	9	–	0
+ – Conference co-champions; ^ – NAIA Division II playoff participant; Rankings from NAIA Division II poll

1981 Hoosier–Buckeye Conference football standings
	Conf.					Overall
Team	W		L		T	W		L		T
No. 8 Anderson (IN) $^	8	–	0	–	0	8	–	2	–	0
No. 10 Findlay	7	–	1	–	0	8	–	1	–	0
Wilmington (OH)	5	–	3	–	0	6	–	3	–	0
Hanover	5	–	3	–	0	5	–	3	–	1
Defiance	4	–	4	–	0	4	–	5	–	0
Earlham	3	–	5	–	0	4	–	5	–	0
Taylor	3	–	5	–	0	4	–	5	–	0
Manchester (IN)	1	–	7	–	0	1	–	8	–	0
Bluffton	0	–	8	–	0	0	–	9	–	0
+ – Conference co-champions; ^ – NAIA Division II playoff participant; Rankings from NAIA Division II poll

1982 Hoosier–Buckeye Conference football standings
	Conf.					Overall
Team	W		L		T	W		L		T
No. 10 Findlay +	7	–	1	–	0	8	–	1	–	0
No. 8 Wilmington (OH) +^	7	–	1	–	0	8	–	2	–	0
No. 17 Hanover	6	–	2	–	0	7	–	2	–	0
Defiance	4	–	4	–	0	5	–	4	–	0
Anderson (IN)	4	–	4	–	0	4	–	5	–	0
Taylor	3	–	5	–	0	4	–	5	–	0
Bluffton	3	–	5	–	0	3	–	6	–	0
Manchester (IN)	2	–	6	–	0	2	–	7	–	0
Earlham	0	–	8	–	0	0	–	9	–	0
+ – Conference co-champions; ^ – NAIA Division II playoff participant; Rankings from NAIA Division II poll

1983 Hoosier–Buckeye Conference football standings
	Conf.					Overall
Team	W		L		T	W		L		T
No. 6 Findlay +^	6	–	1	–	0	8	–	2	–	0
No. 3 Wilmington (OH) +^	6	–	1	–	0	8	–	2	–	0
No. 18 Anderson (IN)	5	–	2	–	0	6	–	3	–	0
Earlham	4	–	3	–	0	6	–	3	–	0
Hanover	3	–	4	–	0	5	–	4	–	0
Defiance	3	–	4	–	0	5	–	4	–	0
Manchester (IN)	1	–	6	–	0	2	–	7	–	0
Bluffton	0	–	7	–	0	0	–	9	–	0
+ – Conference co-champions; ^ – NAIA Division II playoff participant; Rankings from NAIA Division II poll

1984 Hoosier–Buckeye Conference football standings
	Conf.					Overall
Team	W		L		T	W		L		T
No. 7 Findlay $^	6	–	0	–	0	6	–	3	–	0
No. 5 Hanover ^	4	–	1	–	1	8	–	2	–	1
No. 18 Wilmington (OH)	4	–	1	–	1	6	–	2	–	1
Anderson (IN)	2	–	3	–	1	2	–	5	–	2
Manchester (IN)	2	–	4	–	0	2	–	6	–	0
Defiance	1	–	4	–	1	4	–	4	–	1
Bluffton	0	–	6	–	0	2	–	7	–	0
$ – Conference champion; ^ – NAIA Division II playoff participant; Rankings from NAIA Division II poll

1985 Hoosier–Buckeye Conference football standings
	Conf.					Overall
Team	W		L		T	W		L		T
No. 1 Findlay $^	6	–	0	–	0	10	–	1	–	0
No. 11 Bluffton	5	–	1	–	0	8	–	1	–	0
No. 13 Wilmington (OH)	4	–	2	–	0	7	–	2	–	0
Hanover	3	–	3	–	0	5	–	4	–	0
Manchester (IN)	1	–	5	–	0	4	–	5	–	0
Anderson (IN)	1	–	5	–	0	3	–	6	–	0
Defiance	1	–	5	–	0	1	–	8	–	0
$ – Conference champion; ^ – NAIA Division II playoff participant; Rankings from NAIA Division II poll

== See also ==
- List of defunct college football conferences
