= Indianapolis Greyhounds football =

Football team representing the University of Indianapolis

- First season: 1924; 102 years ago
- Athletic director: Kim Pate
- Head coach: Chris Keevers; 8th season, 65–18 (.783)
- Location: Indianapolis, Indiana
- Stadium: Key Stadium (capacity: 5,500)
- NCAA division: Division II
- Conference: Great Lakes Valley Conference
- Colors: Crimson and grey
- All-time record: 470–389–22 (.546)

Conference championships
- 18
- Outfitter: Nike
- Website: UIndyAthletics

The Indianapolis Greyhounds are the college football team that represents the University of Indianapolis (UIndy). The team plays its home games at Key Stadium in Indianapolis, Indiana. UIndy is a member of the Great Lakes Valley Conference in NCAA Division II. On June 24, 2026, it was announced that the Greyhounds will become a member of the Great Midwest Athletic Conference in the fall of 2027.

== Brand and traditions ==
The university was known as Indiana Central from its founding in 1902 until the adoption of its current name in 1986. The Greyhound nickname for athletic teams dates from 1926. The original school colors, cardinal and grey, predated the athletic program, and eventually gave way to crimson and grey. The current "flying I" helmet logo dates from 2007, and has since been adopted as the general UIndy athletics logo. In 2011 Greyhound football adopted black (rather than crimson) as the primary dark jersey color, and most other UIndy teams soon followed suit. Black helmets followed in 2024, replacing the silver helmet that had been traditional since 1961.

== History ==
Indiana Central's varsity sports records date from 1922, with the hiring of the first full-time coach and athletic director. The college joined the Indiana Intercollegiate Conference in 1923, and fielded its first football team in 1924. After a few successful seasons, the Great Depression nearly caused the college to close. Following a winless 1931 campaign with just 15 players, Indiana Central dropped football and did not resume the sport until 1946, amid the post-World War II boom in college enrollments.

In 1947, the Greyhounds became charter members of the Hoosier College Conference, and subsequently joined the National Association for Intercollegiate Athletics (NAIA). They remained in the Hoosier conference until 1970, winning championships in 1947, 1953, 1954, 1955, and 1960, but never qualified for playoffs under the NAIA (which did not hold its first postseason football game until 1956). Dick Nyers, star halfback on the 1953–55 teams, went on to play for the Baltimore Colts in 1956 and 1957. The 1953 team was the best Greyhound squad of the era, finishing an undefeated 8–0, including a non-conference victory at Ferris State.

In 1970–71 Indiana Central joined the Indiana Collegiate Conference (ICC), applied for membership in the National Collegiate Athletic Association (NCAA), and began to offer athletic scholarships (which had not been allowed in the Hoosier conference). Three years later, the NCAA reorganized into its present three divisions (I, II, and III). Members initially were allowed to compete in different divisions in different sports, and were given five years to meet the qualifications of their primary division. Indiana Central chose Division II as its primary division but initially Greyhound football qualified for Division III, and made the D-III playoffs in 1975 (the program's only postseason appearance until 2012), losing in the quarterfinals to eventual national champion Wittenberg.

In 1978 the ICC gave way to the Heartland Collegiate Conference, which did not sponsor basketball and, ultimately, became a football-only league. The Great Lakes Valley Conference (GLVC), founded the same year, became the primary conference for Greyhound athletics, while football competed in the Heartland. The Greyhounds won Heartland championships in 1978 and 1981, but failed to qualify for the Division II playoffs in either season.

By 1990, the Heartland had dwindled to five members, which joined six schools from the Great Lakes Intercollegiate Athletic Conference (GLIAC) to form the Midwest Intercollegiate Football Conference (MIFC). Indianapolis remained an MIFC member through 1998, when the GLIAC resumed sponsorship of football and absorbed the MIFC. The Greyhounds then became a football-only associate member of the GLIAC, where the program remained through the 2011 season. Indianapolis posted 10 winning records in 22 seasons of MIFC-GLIAC play, including an 8–2 mark in 1998, good enough for a second-place finish, but never qualified for the postseason. The 2011 Greyhounds pulled off the rare trifecta of beating Grand Valley State, Ferris State, and Saginaw Valley State in the same season, en route to a 7–4 finish.

Indianapolis began playing football in the GLVC in 2012, when the conference (in its 35th year of competition) finally had enough football-playing members to sponsor the sport. In fourteen seasons of GLVC play, the Greyhounds have won eleven conference championships. They have qualified for the Division II playoffs ten times, scoring postseason victories over Lone Star Conference (LSC) champion Midwestern State in 2012 and Mid-America Intercollegiate Athletics Association (MIAA) champion Fort Hays State in 2018. An undefeated 11–0 regular season in 2017 included a season-opening victory over Grand Valley State. Loren Strickland, star defensive back on the 2019–21 teams, became the first former Greyhound since Dick Nyers in 1957 to play in a regular season NFL game, seeing action with the Detroit Lions in 2024 and 2025 after playing two seasons as a graduate student at Ball State.

== Rivalries ==
From 1924 to 1988, every Greyhound football schedule included Franklin College, located twenty miles south of the Indianapolis campus. Except for the years 1970–77 and 1987–88, their annual contest was a conference game, first in the IIC, then the HCC, and finally the Heartland. The Greyhounds only beat the Grizzlies once in their first ten meetings and never led the series, but went 5–0–1 in the last six contests to narrow the final margin to 23–26–2. The rivalry ended with Franklin's transition to Division III and non-scholarship athletics in the late 1980s.

By then, Butler had replaced Franklin as Indianapolis' primary rival. The Greyhounds and Bulldogs first met in 1930, then again in 1948 and 1954, but did not begin playing annually until 1969. After the Bulldogs won 10 of the first 11 contests, the crosstown rivalry became quite heated; over the last 17 meetings (1977 through 1993) neither team won more than two consecutive games. From 1971 through 1992—years in which the Greyhounds and Bulldogs were conference rivals in the ICC, Heartland, and MIFC—the winner received the Top Dog Trophy. The rivalry ended with Butler's transition to non-scholarship FCS football in the Pioneer Football League, at which time the Greyhounds trailed in the series 7–19–2.

By the mid-1990s the Pumas of St. Joseph's College were the only other Division II football program in Indiana and became the main football rival of the Greyhounds. The two teams first played in 1971 and met annually through 2007 (except for 1998), then again from 2012 through 2016. It was a conference rivalry except for the years 1996–2007, first in the ICC, then the Heartland, the MIFC, and finally the GLVC. When St. Joseph's closed at the end of the 2016–17 academic year, Indianapolis led the series 30–10–1, on the strength of 17 consecutive victories from 1995 onward.

Among opponents on future Indianapolis schedules, the most-played rivalry is with Hillsdale. The Greyhounds first met the Chargers in 1978, then five more times as a non-conference opponent through 1989. The two teams played annually from 1990 through 2009 as members of the MIFC and GLIAC, and as non-conference rivals in all but two seasons from 2013 through 2024. Indianapolis has won the last six meetings to take a 20–16 lead in the series. In 2027, the rivalry will resume as an annual conference matchup, when Indianapolis joins the Great Midwest Athletic Conference (G-MAC).

Other traditional rivals on future Indianapolis schedules include Ashland. The Greyhounds first played the Eagles in 1954, but the heyday of the series came in the years 1980–2011, when they played almost annually (28 times in 32 seasons) as conference rivals in the Heartland, MIFC, and GLIAC. Indianapolis has won the three most recent contests (in 2013, 2019, and 2025) to narrow the Greyhounds' deficit in the series to 14–21. In 2027, the rivalry will resume as an annual conference matchup, when Indianapolis joins the G-MAC.

== Playoffs ==
=== NCAA Division III ===
The Greyhounds made one appearance in the NCAA Division III playoffs, with a record of 0–1.

Year	Round	Opponent	Result
1975	National quarterfinals	Wittenberg	L, 13–14

=== NCAA Division II ===
The Greyhounds have made ten appearances in the NCAA Division II playoffs, with a combined record of 3–10.

Year	Round	Opponent	Result
2012	First round Regional semifinals	Midwestern State; CSU Pueblo	W, 31–14; L, 7–28
2013	First round	West Texas A&M	L, 14–27
2015	First round	CSU Pueblo	L, 14–27
2017	First round	Harding	L, 24–27
2018	First round Regional semifinals	Fort Hays State; Ouachita Baptist	W, 38–27; L, 7–35
2019	First round	Central Missouri	L, 27–37
2022	First round	Pittsburg State	L, 0–35
2023	First round	Pittsburg State	L, 14–35
2024	First round	Grand Valley State	L, 7–24
2025	First round Regional semifinals	Truman State; Minnesota State	W, 57–14; L, 27–35

== Head coaches ==
The Greyhounds have had 15 head football coaches. Bill Bless holds the program records for most seasons coached (22) and most wins (114).

Years	Head Coach	Record	Conference titles
1924–1926	John W. George	9–11–1	
1927–1931	Harry Good	13–22–4	
1946	Edgar Bright	3–4	
1947–1949, 1954	Angus Nicoson	21–12	1947, 1954
1950–1951	Walt Bartkiewicz	8–8–1	
1952–1953	Dave Shaw	13–3	1953
1954–1957	Jim Wallace	18–17–2	1955
1958–1961	Jay Windell	16–19–1	1960
1962–1966	Paul Velez	14–29–2	
1967–1969	Ed Dwyer	4–21–1	
1970–1971	Dick Nyers	9–11	
1972–1993	Bill Bless	114–99–9	1978, 1981
1994–2009	Joe Polizzi	84–89–1	
2010–2018	Bob Bartolomeo	79–26	2012, 2013, 2014, 2015, 2017, 2018
2019–2026	Chris Keevers	65–18	2020–21, 2022, 2023, 2024, 2025
	All-time total:	470–389–22	18 conference championships
