= Anderson Ravens and Lady Ravens =

- University: Anderson University (Indiana)
- Nickname: Ravens and Lady Ravens
- NCAA: Division III
- Conference: Heartland Collegiate Athletic Conference
- Athletic director: Marcie Taylor
- Location: Anderson, Indiana
- Varsity teams: 18
- Football stadium: Macholtz Stadium
- Basketball arena: O. C. Lewis Gymnasium
- Colors: Orange and Black
- Mascot: Rodney the Raven
- Website: athletics.anderson.edu
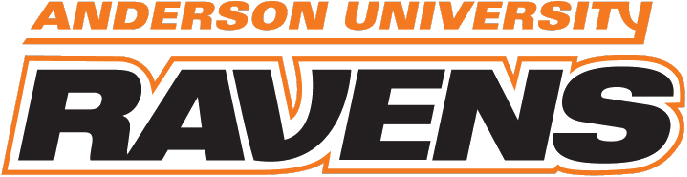

The Ravens is the name used for all of the men's intercollegiate athletic teams that play for Anderson University in Anderson, Indiana. The female intercollegiate teams are known as the Lady Ravens.

Men's sports offered at Anderson University include football, basketball, baseball, lacrosse, tennis, golf, soccer, cross country, and track & field. Women's sports offered at Anderson University include basketball, softball, lacrosse, tennis, volleyball, soccer, golf, cross country, and track & field.

== Conference Affiliation ==
The Ravens compete in athletics in the NCAA Division III and the Heartland Collegiate Athletic Conference.

== Varsity Sports ==
Men's sports	Women's sports
Baseball	Basketball
Basketball	Cross country
Cross country	Golf
Football	Soccer
Soccer	Softball
Swimming and diving	Swimming and diving
Tennis	Tennis
Track and field	Track and field
	Volleyball

=== Football ===
Anderson professional players
Player	Position	League	Team	Years	Ref
Brad Lamb	WR	NFL	Buffalo Bills	1991–1993	
Tim Mooney	DE	NFL	Philadelphia Eagles	1987	

In 1970 the Ravens played in the NAIA Division II National Football Championship and lost to Westminster (Pa.), 21–16.

The Anderson Ravens football team won the HCAC conference title in 2001 season.

Two former AU players currently playing professional football are Hyman Smith and Joel Steele. In 2008, a new all-weather synthetic field turf and outdoor game lights were installed at Macholtz Stadium.

=== The Kevin Donley era ===
Kevin Donley has been one of the most successful coaches in NAIA football. After graduating from Anderson College in 1973, Donley returned to his alma mater in 1976 to serve two seasons as offensive coordinator. In 1978, at the age of 26, Donley was named the youngest head coach in the country. Over the next four years, Donley's teams would compile an overall record of 28–9 (.757), winning the conference title in 1980 and 1981. Through 2017 and 71 years of Anderson football history, Donley's overall winning percentage stands as the best among all Anderson football coaches.

==== 1978 ====
(5–4 overall, 4–4 conference)

Date	Opponent	Site	Result
September 16	at Hanover	Hanover, IN	L 10–12
September 23	at Defiance	Defiance, OH	W 38–19
September 30	Bluffton	Anderson, IN	W 17–7
October 7	at Wilmington	Wilmington, OH	L 13–17
October 14	Manchester	Anderson, IN	L 9–13
October 21	at Findlay	Findlay, OH	L 0–19
October 28	Earlham	Anderson, IN	W 42–10
November 4	at Franklin*	Franklin, IN	W 21–20
November 11	Taylor	Anderson, IN	W 21–7
*Non-conference game

==== 1979 ====
(7–2 overall, 6–2 conference)

Date	Opponent	Site	Result
September 15	Hanover	Anderson, IN	L 0–26
September 22	Defiance	Anderson, IN	W 16–7
September 29	at Bluffton	Bluffton, OH	W 21–14
October 6	Wilmington	Anderson, IN	W 35–6
October 13	at Manchester	North Manchester, IN	W 38–20
October 20	Findlay	Anderson, IN	L 6–21
October 27	at Earlham	Richmond, IN	W 63–19
November 3	Franklin*	Anderson, IN	W 42–35
November 10	at Taylor	Upland, IN	W 21–13
*Non-conference game

==== 1980 ====
(8–1 overall, 7–1 conference)

Date	Opponent	Site	Result
September 20	at Defiance	Defiance, OH	W 28–0
September 27	Bluffton	Anderson, IN	W 27–0
October 4	at Wilmington	Wilmington, OH	W 21–6
October 11	Manchester	Anderson, IN	W 58–0
October 18	at Findlay	Findlay, OH	W 10–0
October 25	Earlham	Anderson, IN	W 34–0
November 1	at Olivet Nazarene*	Kankakee, IL	W 24–14
November 8	Taylor	Anderson, IN	W 55–12
November 15	at Hanover	Hanover, IN	L 13–28
*Non-conference game

==== 1981 ====
(8–2 overall, 8–0 conference)

Date	Opponent	Site	Result
September 19	Defiance	Anderson, IN	W 13–0
September 26	at Bluffton	Bluffton, OH	W 34–0
October 3	Wilmington	Anderson, IN	W 35–17
October 10	at Manchester	North Manchester, IN	W 47–14
October 17	Findlay	Anderson, IN	W 25–13
October 24	at Earlham	Richmond, IN	W 32–3
October 31	Olivet Nazarene*	Anderson, IN	L 13–14
November 7	at Taylor	Upland, IN	W 29–22
November 14	Hanover	Anderson, IN	W 28–23
November 21	at Westminster*	New Wilmington, PA (NAIA D-II Quarterfinal)	L 6–21
*Non-conference game

=== Baseball ===
The baseball teams has qualified for postseason tournaments 30 of the last 32 years and 99 percent of the four-year players have graduated. Some notable accomplishments are:

- Eight World Series appearances
- 19 years in the final Top 20 Coaches Poll
- 16 conference championships
- 32 players signed professional contracts
- NAIA Indiana champions 12 times, 8 of last 9 years in NAIA
- 6 NCAA Div. III Regional appearances since 1993
- 3 NCAA Div. III World Series appearances.

=== Women's basketball ===
In more recent history, the women's basketball team made their first appearance in the Division III NCAA Tournament in 2000–2001.

The Women's Basketball team had a co-conference championship in 2007–2008 when they finished 18–8 (12–4).

=== Softball ===
The Softball team has posted a record of 214–195 over the past decade, reaching the NCAA regionals three times. In total, they have had 7 conference MVP's and 71 All-Conference players. The 1999 team was the most successful in school history. They finished with a total of 35 wins, including a 14–0 performance in conference play.

=== Men's Soccer ===
The Men's Soccer team also became the first NCAA team, regardless of division, to be named Academic All-Americans 12 straight years. The Women's team achieved 11 straight seasons. Major team accomplishments include, two HCAC tournament titles, two HCAC regular season titles, 38 All-Conference players, 28 NSCAA Academic All-American selections, three HCAC Players of the Year and two HCAC Freshmen of the Year.

== Cross Country Teams ==
The men's cross country team has won 14 conference titles since 1988, having perfect scored twice, 16 most valuable runner awards, and 5 freshmen of the year awards (since 2000). In addition, they have won 11 coach of the year awards. The women's cross country team has also won conference awards since 1993 including, 11 conference titles, 11 most valuable runner awards, 4 freshmen of the year awards (since 2000), and 10 coach of the year awards.

== Facilities ==
Most athletic teams have on-campus facilities for competition, including Macholtz Stadium for football, and O. C. Lewis Gymnasium for basketball and women's volleyball.

== Team colors ==
The official school colors for Anderson University are Orange and Black. White is often used as a secondary color and for alternate jerseys.

== Mascot ==
Formerly the Tigers, AU's nickname was changed to the Ravens in 1937. The current mascot is Rodney the Raven.
