= Walter Marks =

Walter Marks may refer to:

- Wally Marks (1905–1992), American football, basketball, and baseball player, coach and college athletics administrator
- Walter Marks (composer) (born 1934), American songwriter, playwright, screenwriter, and novelist
- Walter Marks (politician) (1875–1951), Australian lawyer, yachtsman, and politician
