= Wayne Tartars football, 1940–1949 =

American college football season

1940–1949 Wayne Tartars football
- Conference: Independent
- Head coach: Joe Gembis (1932–1945); John P. Hackett (1946–1947); Herbert L. Smith (1948) Louis F. Zarza (1949–1954)

The Wayne Tartars football program, 1940–1949 represented Wayne University (now known as Wayne State University during the 1940s in college football. The team was led by four head coaches during the decade: Joe Gembis (1932–1945); John P. Hackett (1946–1947); Herbert L. Smith (1948); and Louis F. Zarza (1949–1954).

== 1940 ==
1940 Wayne Tartars football
- Conference: Independent
- Record: 4–1–3
- Head coach: Joe Gembis (9th season)
- Captains: Frank Cudillo; Pat Savage
- Home stadium: Keyworth Stadium

1940 Midwestern college football independents records
	Conf.			Overall
Team	W	L	T	W		L		T
Michigan Tech		–		5	–	1	–	0
Detroit		–		7	–	2	–	0
Notre Dame		–		7	–	2	–	0
Xavier		–		7	–	3	–	0
Ohio		–		5	–	2	–	2
Wayne		–		4	–	1	–	3
Dayton		–		6	–	3	–	0
Cincinnati		–		5	–	3	–	1
Wichita		–		6	–	4	–	0
Central Michigan		–		4	–	3	–	1
Marquette		–		4	–	4	–	0
Michigan State		–		3	–	4	–	1
Ohio Wesleyan		–		2	–	4	–	3
Akron		–		2	–	5	–	2
Western State Teachers		–		2	–	5	–	0
Michigan State Normal		–		1	–	5	–	1
Miami (OH)		–		0	–	7	–	1

The 1940 Wayne Tartars football team represented Wayne University (later renamed Wayne State University) as an independent during the 1940 college football season. In their ninth year under head coach Joe Gembis, the Tartars compiled a 4–1–3 record and outscored all opponents by a combined total of 79 to 69.

Wayne was ranked at No. 225 (out of 697 college football teams) in the final rankings under the Litkenhous Difference by Score system for 1940.

=== Schedule ===
Date	Opponent	Site	Result	Attendance	Source
September 27	at Detroit	University of Detroit Stadium; Detroit, MI	L 7–42	21,200	
October 5	at Western State Teachers (MI)	Waldo Stadium; Kalamazoo, MI	W 13–6		
October 12	at Ohio Wesleyan	Delaware, OH	T 0–0		
October 19	Akron	Keyworth Stadium; Hamtramck, MI	T 7–7		
November 2	Central Michigan^{†}	Keyworth Stadium; Hamtramck, MI	T 7–7	3,500	
November 9	at Michigan State Normal	Briggs Field; Ypsilanti, MI	W 19–7		
November 16	at Buffalo	Rotary Field; Buffalo, NY	W 6–0		
November 21	Bowling Green	Keyworth Stadium; Hamtramck, MI	W 19–0	6,000	
^{†}Homecoming

== 1941 ==
1941 Wayne Tartars football
- Conference: Independent
- Record: 2–6
- Head coach: Joe Gembis (10th season)
- Captain: Ed Larrimore
- Home stadium: Keyworth Stadium

1941 Midwestern college football independents records
	Conf.			Overall
Team	W	L	T	W		L		T
Western Michigan		–		8	–	0	–	0
No. 3 Notre Dame		–		8	–	0	–	1
Youngstown		–		7	–	0	–	1
Xavier		–		9	–	1	–	0
Detroit		–		7	–	2	–	0
Ohio		–		5	–	2	–	1
Dayton		–		7	–	3	–	0
Cincinnati		–		6	–	3	–	0
Akron		–		5	–	3	–	1
Michigan State		–		5	–	3	–	1
Central Michigan		–		4	–	3	–	0
Ohio Wesleyan		–		5	–	4	–	0
Michigan Tech		–		3	–	3	–	0
Marquette		–		4	–	5	–	0
Carthage		–		1	–	5	–	2
Wayne		–		2	–	6	–	0
Miami (OH)		–		2	–	7	–	0
Western Ontario		–		1	–	4	–	0
Wichita		–		1	–	6	–	1
Michigan State Normal		–		0	–	5	–	2
Detroit Tech		–		0	–	7	–	1
Rankings from AP Poll

The 1941 Wayne Tartars football team represented Wayne University (later renamed Wayne State University) as an independent during the 1941 college football season. The Tartars compiled a 2–6 record and were outscored by opponents, 204 to 24. The Tartars two victories were over Central Michigan (6–0) and Michigan State Normal (12–0).

The team's head coach was Joe Gembis in his tenth season. His assistant coaches were Joseph Truskowski and Ox Emerson.

Prior to the season, Wayne conducted its preseason training camp at Mio, Michigan. Coach Gembis had expected 15 lettermen to return from his 1940 team that had compiled a 4–1–3 record. However, the military draft intervened, and seven of the team's 15 returning lettermen were in the Army at the start of the 1941 season with two more waiting to be inducted. Another had joined the Michigan State Police.

After the team lost its first three games without scoring a point, Gembis came under fire for the team's poor performance, despite coaching at a school with approximately 10,000 students.

Tom Kennedy played at the tackle position for the 1941 Wayne team. In 1944, he played two games for the Detroit Lions, the first Wayne alumnus to play in the National Football League.

=== Schedule ===
Date	Opponent	Site	Result	Attendance	Source
October 3	at Detroit	University of Detroit Stadium; Detroit, MI	L 0–54	17,659	
October 11	at Cincinnati	Nippert Stadium; Cincinnati, OH	L 0–37	6,700	
October 18	Ohio Wesleyan	Keyworth Stadium; Hamtramck, MI	L 0–21	3,500	
October 25	at Michigan State	Macklin Field; East Lansing, MI	L 6–39	15,200	
November 1	Central Michigan^{†}	Keyworth Stadium; Hamtramck, MI	W 6–0		
November 8	Michigan State Normal	Keyworth Stadium; Hamtramck, MI	W 12–0	1,500	
November 15	Western Michigan	Keyworth Stadium; Hamtramck, MI	L 0–34	10,000	
November 20	at Bowling Green	Bowling Green, OH	L 0–19	6,000	
^{†}Homecoming

== 1942 ==
1942 Wayne Tartars football
- Conference: Independent
- Record: 1–6–1
- Head coach: Joe Gembis (11th season)
- Captains: Frank Chorney; Donald Kennedy
- Home stadium: University of Detroit Stadium

1942 Midwestern college football independents records
	Conf.			Overall
Team	W	L	T	W		L		T
Central Michigan		–		6	–	0	–	0
Western Michigan		–		5	–	1	–	0
Cincinnati		–		8	–	2	–	0
Dayton		–		8	–	2	–	0
Marquette		–		7	–	2	–	0
No. 6 Notre Dame		–		7	–	2	–	2
Ohio		–		5	–	3	–	0
Detroit		–		5	–	4	–	0
Wichita		–		5	–	4	–	0
Michigan State		–		4	–	3	–	2
Michigan State Normal		–		3	–	3	–	1
Ohio Wesleyan		–		4	–	4	–	0
Xavier		–		4	–	5	–	0
Carthage		–		3	–	4	–	0
Miami (OH)		–		3	–	6	–	0
Wayne		–		1	–	6	–	1
Akron		–		0	–	7	–	2
Michigan Tech		–		0	–	3	–	0
Rankings from AP Poll

The 1942 Wayne Tartars football team represented Wayne University (later renamed Wayne State University) as an independent during the 1942 college football season. The team compiled a 1–6–1 record and was outscored by opponents, 144 to 52. It played its home games at the University of Detroit Stadium.

Joe Gembis was in his 11th year as head coach. His assistant coaches, Joseph Truskowski and Ox Emerson, were lost to military service for the 1942 season. In the absence of Truskowski and Emerson, two Wayne alumni Laurence "Lefty" Russell and Ralph Betker served as assistant coaches.

Before the season began, the team held a 10-day training camp in Charlevoix, Michigan.

The team's statistical leaders included Doug Rutherford, a sophomore from Denby High School, with 58 pass completions. Frank Chorney and Donald Kennedy were the team captains.

Wayne was ranked at No. 306 (out of 590 college and military teams) in the final rankings under the Litkenhous Difference by Score System for 1942.

=== Schedule ===
Date	Opponent	Site	Result	Attendance	Source
October 2	vs. Detroit	University of Detroit Stadium; Detroit, MI	L 0–27	15,670	
October 10	at Michigan State	Macklin Field; East Lansing, MI	L 6–46		
October 17	Bowling Green	University of Detroit Stadium; Detroit, MI	L 6–20		
October 24	at Michigan State Normal	Briggs Field; Ypsilanti, MI	T 12–12		
October 27	Grosse Ile NAS	University of Detroit Stadium; Detroit, MI	L 3–7	5,139	
October 30	at Central Michigan	Alumni Field; Mount Pleasant, MI	L 0–13		
November 7	Akron^{†}	University of Detroit Stadium; Detroit, MI	W 25–6	3,500	
November 14	at Western Michigan	Waldo Stadium; Kalamazoo, MI	L 0–13		
^{†}Homecoming

=== Roster ===
- Asquini, Valentino
- Beardsley, David
- Carpenter, Samuel
- Chorney, Frank
- Cotton, John
- Faughn, John
- Graham, Jack
- Hagen, Reed
- Hannan, James
- Kanfer, Morton
- Kennedy, Donald
- Magnatta, Joseph
- Malinowski, Eugene
- Meyers, Donald
- Miller, Paul
- Mullen, Donald
- Olmstead, Richard
- Perry, Raymond
- Raskin, Lawrence
- Rickert, Louis
- Rutherford, Douglas
- Sabo, Frank
- Tottis, Mitchell
- Young, George (Donald)

== 1943 ==
1943 Wayne Tartars football
- Conference: Independent
- Record: 0–3
- Head coach: Joe Gembis (12th season)
- Captain: Frank Bielman Jr.
- Home stadium: University of Detroit Stadium

1943 Midwestern college football independents records
	Conf.			Overall
Team	W	L	T	W		L		T
Michigan State Normal		–		2	–	0	–	0
DePauw		–		5	–	0	–	1
No. 1 Notre Dame		–		9	–	1	–	0
Miami (OH)		–		7	–	2	–	1
Western Michigan		–		4	–	2	–	0
Bowling Green		–		5	–	3	–	1
Marquette		–		3	–	4	–	1
Central Michigan		–		2	–	3	–	0
Ohio Wesleyan		–		4	–	6	–	0
Xavier		–		1	–	6	–	0
Wayne		–		0	–	3	–	0
Rankings from AP Poll

The 1943 Wayne Tartars football team represented Wayne University (later renamed Wayne State University) as an independent during the 1943 college football season. The team compiled a 0–3 record and was outscored by opponents, 64 to 0.

Joe Gembis was in his 12th year as head coach. Frank Bielman, Jr., was the team captain.

As the fall semester began, there was uncertainty as to whether Wayne would be able to field a football team. Many schools had cancelled the football season due to the loss of students to wartime military service. Because Wayne had no Navy or Marine program, and the prior year's players were in the military, the team would have to be formed from incoming freshmen. Coach Gembis noted at the time: "We want to have a football team, even if we play only two games."

In late September 1943, a team was formed with 35 players. Coach Gembis arranged for a home and home series with Michigan State Normal and wrote to the commissioner of the Ohio Athletic Conference in search of other opponents.

A fourth game was arranged with Otterbein College, but it was cancelled when Otterbein was unable to field a team.

At the end of the season, 16 players received varsity letters, and Marshall Chrisjohn was selected as the team's most valuable player. The players receiving varsity letters were: Wallace Bagozzi, Frank Bielman, Francis Blake, Marshall Chrisjohn, Thomas Connor, Fred Cuthrell, Allan Dow, Andrew Edgerton, James Fears, Masis Godoshian, James Hannan, Richard Hartley, Allen Henderson, John Hochstein, Don Olson, and Tony Yangovyian.

=== Schedule ===
Date	Opponent	Site	Result	Attendance	Source
October 16	Michigan State Normal	University of Detroit Stadium; Detroit, MI	L 0–14		
October 25	at Michigan State Normal	Briggs Field; Ypsilanti, MI	L 0–14	1,000	
November 13	at Xavier	Xavier Stadium; Cincinnati, OH	L 0–36	< 500	

== 1944 ==
1944 Wayne Tartars football
- Conference: Independent
- Record: 1–1
- Head coach: Joe Gembis (13th season)
- Captain: John Rice
- Home stadium: University of Detroit Stadium

1944 Midwestern college football independents records
	Conf.			Overall
Team	W	L	T	W		L		T
Miami (OH)		–		8	–	1	–	0
Michigan State		–		6	–	1	–	0
No. 9 Notre Dame		–		8	–	2	–	0
Central Michigan		–		5	–	2	–	0
Wichita		–		5	–	2	–	1
Bowling Green		–		5	–	3	–	0
Western Michigan		–		4	–	3	–	0
Wayne		–		1	–	1	–	0
Ohio Wesleyan		–		1	–	8	–	1
Marquette		–		1	–	7	–	0
Rankings from AP Poll

The 1944 Wayne Tartars football team represented Wayne University (later renamed Wayne State University) as an independent during the 1944 college football season. The team compiled a 1–1 record, defeating the team from Otterbein College and losing to Michigan State.

Joe Gembis was in his 13th year as head coach. John Rice was the team captain. Harold Vogler was selected as the most valuable player.

The team was originally scheduled to play five games, but three of the games were cancelled. Wayne had scheduled a home-and-away series with Michigan State Normal on October 21 and November 11, but Normal's coach cancelled, claiming not to have enough manpower. A third game against Muskingum was also cancelled.

=== Schedule ===
Date	Time	Opponent	Site	Result	Attendance	Source
October 14		Otterbein	University of Detroit Stadium; Detroit, MI	W 27–12	500	
October 27	8:15 p.m.	Michigan State	University of Detroit Stadium; Detroit, MI	L 0–32	10,500	

== 1945 ==
1945 Wayne Tartars football
- Conference: Independent
- Record: 2–5–1
- Head coach: Joe Gembis (14th season)
- Captain: Nicholas Cherup
- Home stadium: University of Detroit Stadium

1945 Midwestern college football independents records
	Conf.			Overall
Team	W	L	T	W		L		T
Michigan State Normal		–		5	–	0	–	1
Central Michigan		–		6	–	1	–	0
Miami (OH)		–		7	–	2	–	0
No. 9 Notre Dame		–		7	–	2	–	1
Detroit		–		6	–	3	–	0
Great Lakes Navy		–		6	–	4	–	1
Michigan State		–		5	–	3	–	1
Marquette		–		5	–	4	–	1
Bowling Green		–		4	–	3	–	0
Western Michigan		–		4	–	3	–	0
Cincinnati		–		4	–	4	–	0
Ohio		–		3	–	4	–	0
Ohio Wesleyan		–		3	–	4	–	0
Carthage		–		2	–	3	–	0
Wayne		–		2	–	5	–	1
Rankings from AP Poll

The 1945 Wayne Tartars football team represented Wayne University (later renamed Wayne State University) as an independent during the 1945 college football season. The team compiled a 2–5–1 record.

Joe Gembis was in his 14th and final year as head coach. Nicholas Cherup was the team captain. Cherup was also selected as the most valuable player.

=== Schedule ===
Date	Opponent	Site	Result	Attendance	Source
October 6	at Ohio Wesleyan	Delaware, OH	L 6–27		
October 13	Central Michigan	University of Detroit Stadium; Detroit, MI	L 0–26	1,000	
October 20	at Michigan State	Macklin Field; East Lansing, MI	L 7–27		
October 27	at Albion	Albion, MI	W 7–6	1,000	
November 2	Hillsdale	University of Detroit Stadium; Detroit, MI	W 38–0	2,348	
November 9	Michigan State Normal^{†}	University of Detroit Stadium; Detroit, MI	L 13–14	2,683	
November 16	at Michigan State Normal	Briggs Field; Ypsilanti, MI	T 0–0		
November 22	at Detroit	University of Detroit Stadium; Detroit, MI	L 13–33	8,622	
^{†}Homecoming

== 1946 ==
1946 Wayne Tartars football
- Conference: Mid-America Conference
- Record: 4–5 (0–1 MAC)
- Head coach: John P. Hackett (1st season)

1946 Mid-America Conference football standings
	Conf.					Overall
Team	W		L		T	W		L		T
Cincinnati $	2	–	0	–	0	9	–	2	–	0
Western Reserve	1	–	1	–	0	4	–	3	–	2
Ohio	0	–	1	–	0	6	–	3	–	0
Wayne	0	–	1	–	0	4	–	5	–	0
$ – Conference champion

The 1946 Wayne Tartars football team represented Wayne University (later renamed Wayne State University) in the Mid-America Conference (MAC) during the 1946 college football season. Under first-year head coach John P. Hackett, the team compiled a 4–5 record.

=== Schedule ===
Date	Opponent	Site	Result	Attendance	Source
September 20	at Detroit*	University of Detroit Stadium; Detroit, MI	L 0–31	23,800	
September 28	at Michigan State*	Macklin Field; East Lansing, MI	L 0–42	19,106	
October 5	Ohio Wesleyan*	University of Detroit Stadium; Detroit, MI	W 13–0	3,025	
October 12	at Western Reserve	Shaw Stadium; East Cleveland, OH	L 0–7		
October 19	at George Washington*	Washington, DC	L 6–20		
October 25	at Buffalo*	Civic Stadium; Buffalo, NY	W 25–20	4,500	
November 2	Springfield*	Keyworth Stadium; Detroit, MI	W 12–6	1,794	
November 11	at Toledo*	Glass Bowl; Toledo, OH	L 6–14	10,000	
November 16	Case Tech*^{†}	Keyworth Stadium; Detroit, MI	W 37–6	2,157	
*Non-conference game; ^{†}Homecoming

== 1947 ==
1947 Wayne Tartars football
- Conference: Independent
- Record: 5–2
- Head coach: John P. Hackett (2nd season)
- Captains: Allen Griffiths; Stephen Zukowski
- Home stadium: University of Detroit Stadium, Keyworth Stadium

1947 Midwestern non-major college football independents records
	Conf.			Overall
Team	W	L	T	W		L		T
Youngstown		–		8	–	2	–	0
Ball State		–		5	–	1	–	2
Ohio Wesleyan		–		6	–	2	–	1
Wayne		–		5	–	2	–	0
Dayton		–		6	–	3	–	0
Washington University		–		5	–	3	–	0
Bowling Green		–		5	–	5	–	0
Michigan Tech		–		3	–	3	–	1
Xavier		–		4	–	4	–	1
Central Michigan		–		2	–	5	–	1
Valparaiso		–		2	–	5	–	1
Michigan State Normal		–		1	–	6	–	0

The 1947 Wayne Tartars football team represented Wayne University (later renamed Wayne State University) as an independent during the 1947 college football season. In its second season under head coach John P. Hackett, the team compiled a 5–2 record. The team divided its home games between the University of Detroit Stadium and Keyworth Stadium.

John Hazeley led the team with 475 rushing yards and was selected as the team's most valuable player. Allen Griffiths and Stephen Zukowski were the team captains.

In the final Litkenhous Ratings released in mid-December, Wayne was ranked at No. 122 out of 500 college football teams.

=== Schedule ===
Date	Opponent	Site	Result	Attendance	Source
September 27	at Great Lakes Navy	Great Lakes, IL	W 33–7		
October 3	at Detroit	University of Detroit Stadium; Detroit, MI	L 7–40	24,375	
October 17	Western Reserve^{†}	University of Detroit Stadium; Detroit, MI	W 20–13	6,613	
October 25	Buffalo	Keyworth Stadium; Hamtramck, MI	W 33–12	6,200	
November 1	at Springfield	Springfield, MA	W 14–10		
November 8	Toledo	Keyworth Stadium; Hamtramck, MI	L 0–7		
November 15	George Washington	Keyworth Stadium; Hamtramck, MI	W 7–6	1,097	
^{†}Homecoming

== 1948 ==
1948 Wayne Tartars football
- Conference: Independent
- Record: 4–4
- Head coach: Herbert L. Smith (1st season)
- Home stadium: University of Detroit Stadium

1948 Midwestern non-major college football independents records
	Conf.			Overall
Team	W	L	T	W		L		T
Michigan Tech		–		7	–	0	–	0
Bowling Green		–		8	–	0	–	1
Washington University		–		9	–	1	–	0
John Carroll		–		7	–	1	–	2
Ashland		–		6	–	1	–	2
Ball State		–		6	–	2	–	0
Dayton		–		7	–	2	–	1
Baldwin–Wallace		–		5	–	2	–	2
Indiana State		–		4	–	4	–	0
Wabash		–		4	–	4	–	0
Wayne		–		4	–	4	–	0
Valparaiso		–		4	–	5	–	0
Toledo		–		5	–	6	–	0
Michigan State Normal		–		3	–	5	–	0
Xavier		–		4	–	6	–	0
Central Michigan		–		3	–	6	–	0

The 1948 Wayne Tartars football team represented Wayne University (later renamed Wayne State University) as an independent during the 1948 college football season. Under first-year head coach Herbert L. Smith, the team compiled a 4–4 record.

Wayne was ranked at No. 128 in the final Litkenhous Difference by Score System ratings for 1948.

=== Schedule ===
Date	Opponent	Site	Result	Attendance	Source
September 25	Southern Illinois	University of Detroit Stadium; Detroit, MI	W 26–0	8,000	
October 2	at Niagara	Niagara Falls, NY	W 13–7		
October 9	at Quantico Marines	Quantico, VA	L 0–7		
October 16	St. Bonaventure^{†}	University of Detroit Stadium; Detroit, MI	L 0–13	9,000	
October 22	at Detroit	University of Detroit Stadium; Detroit, MI	L 0–13	24,321	
October 30	at Central Michigan	Alumni Field; Mount Pleasant, MI	W 27–12		
November 6	at Toledo	Glass Bowl; Toledo, OH	L 14–27	5,000	
November 13	Omaha	University of Detroit Stadium; Detroit, MI	W 46–20	3,012	
^{†}Homecoming

== 1949 ==
1949 Wayne Tartars football
- Conference: Independent
- Record: 3–5
- Head coach: Louis F. Zarza (1st season)

1949 Midwestern college football independents records
	Conf.			Overall
Team	W	L	T	W		L		T
No. 1 Notre Dame		–		10	–	0	–	0
Ball State		–		8	–	0	–	0
Xavier		–		10	–	1	–	0
Valparaiso		–		8	–	1	–	1
Washington University		–		7	–	2	–	0
Baldwin–Wallace		–		6	–	2	–	0
Wabash		–		5	–	2	–	1
Dayton		–		6	–	3	–	0
John Carroll		–		6	–	3	–	0
No. 19 Michigan State		–		6	–	3	–	0
Toledo		–		6	–	4	–	0
Michigan Tech		–		4	–	3	–	0
Youngstown		–		4	–	3	–	1
Bowling Green		–		4	–	5	–	0
Marquette		–		4	–	5	–	0
Central Michigan		–		3	–	4	–	0
Wayne		–		3	–	5	–	0
Indiana State		–		1	–	9	–	0
Michigan State Normal		–		0	–	8	–	0
Rankings from AP Poll

The 1949 Wayne Tartars football team represented Wayne University (later renamed Wayne State University) as an independent during the 1949 college football season. Under first-year head coach Louis F. Zarza, the team compiled a 3–5 record.

=== Schedule ===
Date	Opponent	Site	Result	Attendance	Source
September 24	Southern Illinois	Detroit, MI	W 48–8		
October 1	at Western Illinois	Macomb, IL	W 33–14		
October 8	at St. Bonaventure	Forness Stadium; Olean, NY	L 7–25		
October 14	Quantico Marines	Detroit, MI	L 14–33		
October 21	at Detroit	University of Detroit Stadium; Detroit, MI	L 0–41	22,359	
October 29	Niagara	Detroit, MI	L 6–14		
November 5	Toledo^{†}	Tom Adams Field; Detroit, MI	L 7–37		
November 12	Omaha	Detroit, MI	W 38–26		
^{†}Homecoming
