= 1941 Bowling Green Falcons football team =

American college football season

1941 Bowling Green Falcons football
- Conference: Ohio Athletic Conference
- Record: 7–1–1 (4–0–1 OAC)
- Head coach: Robert Whittaker (1st season)
- Captain: Edward Wellner
- Home stadium: University Stadium

1941 Ohio Athletic Conference football standings
| | Conf. | | | | | Overall |
| Team | W | | L | | T | W | | L | | T |
|---|---|---|---|---|---|---|---|---|---|---|
| Case $ | 4 | – | 0 | – | 0 | 7 | – | 1 | – | 0 |
| Toledo | 2 | – | 0 | – | 0 | 7 | – | 4 | – | 0 |
| Ohio Northern | 5 | – | 0 | – | 1 | 6 | – | 1 | – | 1 |
| Bowling Green | 4 | – | 0 | – | 1 | 5 | – | 2 | – | 0 |
| Denison | 5 | – | 1 | – | 1 | 7 | – | 1 | – | 1 |
| Wooster | 5 | – | 1 | – | 1 | 5 | – | 1 | – | 1 |
| Kenyon | 4 | – | 1 | – | 0 | 5 | – | 2 | – | 0 |
| Heidelberg | 5 | – | 2 | – | 0 | 6 | – | 2 | – | 0 |
| Otterbein | 4 | – | 2 | – | 0 | 5 | – | 3 | – | 0 |
| Wittenberg | 3 | – | 4 | – | 0 | 4 | – | 4 | – | 0 |
| Muskingum | 2 | – | 4 | – | 0 | 3 | – | 5 | – | 0 |
| John Carroll | 1 | – | 2 | – | 1 | 2 | – | 5 | – | 1 |
| Kent State | 1 | – | 3 | – | 0 | 2 | – | 5 | – | 1 |
| Marietta | 1 | – | 3 | – | 0 | 1 | – | 6 | – | 0 |
| Capital | 1 | – | 4 | – | 0 | 2 | – | 4 | – | 1 |
| Baldwin–Wallace | 0 | – | 2 | – | 1 | 3 | – | 4 | – | 1 |
| Ashland | 0 | – | 3 | – | 0 | 0 | – | 5 | – | 0 |
| Findlay | 0 | – | 4 | – | 0 | 3 | – | 5 | – | 0 |
| Oberlin | 0 | – | 4 | – | 0 | 0 | – | 7 | – | 0 |
| Mount Union | 0 | – | 6 | – | 0 | 1 | – | 7 | – | 0 |
$ – Conference champion

The 1941 Bowling Green Falcons football team was an American football team that represented Bowling Green State University as a member of the Ohio Athletic Conference (OAC) during the 1941 college football season. In its first season under head coach Robert Whittaker, the team compiled a 7–1–1 record and outscored opponents by a total of 173 to 40. Edward Wellner was the team captain.

Bowling Green was ranked at No. 161 (out of 681 teams) in the final rankings under the Litkenhous Difference by Score System.

The team played its home games at University Stadium in Bowling Green, Ohio.

== Schedule ==
| Date | Opponent | Site | Result | Attendance | Source |
|---|---|---|---|---|---|
| September 27 | Wooster | University Stadium; Bowling Green, OH | T 14–14 | | |
| October 3 | at Akron* | Rubber Bowl; Akron, OH | L 0–8 | | |
| October 11 | at Miami (OH)* | Miami Field; Oxford, OH | W 9–0 | | |
| October 18 | at Michigan State Normal* | Briggs Field; Ypsilanti, MI | W 20–6 | | |
| October 25 | Heidelberg^{†} | University Stadium; Bowling Green, OH | W 39–6 | 4,000 | |
| November 1 | at Kent State | Kent, OH (rivalry) | W 12–6 | 3,000 | |
| November 8 | at Wittenberg | Springfield, OH | W 13–0 | | |
| November 15 | Findlay | University Stadium; Bowling Green, OH | W 47–0 | | |
| November 20 | Wayne* | University Stadium; Bowling Green, OH | W 19–0 | 6,000 | |
*Non-conference game; ^{†}Homecoming
