= 1941 Ball State Cardinals football team =

American college football season

1941 Ball State Cardinals football
- Conference: Indiana Intercollegiate Conference
- Record: 3–2–2 (3–1–1 IIC)
- Head coach: John Magnabosco (7th season)
- Home stadium: Cardinal Field

1941 Indiana Intercollegiate Conference football standings
| | Conf. | | | | | Overall |
| Team | W | | L | | T | W | | L | | T |
|---|---|---|---|---|---|---|---|---|---|---|
| Rose Poly + | 4 | – | 0 | – | 0 | 7 | – | 0 | – | 0 |
| Saint Joseph's (IN) + | 3 | – | 0 | – | 0 | 8 | – | 0 | – | 1 |
| Ball State | 3 | – | 1 | – | 1 | 3 | – | 2 | – | 2 |
| Butler | 3 | – | 1 | – | 0 | 5 | – | 4 | – | 0 |
| Wabash | 4 | – | 2 | – | 0 | 5 | – | 3 | – | 1 |
| DePauw | 3 | – | 2 | – | 0 | 6 | – | 2 | – | 0 |
| Indiana State | 2 | – | 1 | – | 1 | 5 | – | 2 | – | 1 |
| Evansville | 2 | – | 1 | – | 1 | 3 | – | 5 | – | 1 |
| Manchester | 2 | – | 1 | – | 1 | 2 | – | 2 | – | 2 |
| Franklin (IN) | 2 | – | 4 | – | 1 | 2 | – | 5 | – | 1 |
| Hanover | 1 | – | 3 | – | 0 | 1 | – | 7 | – | 0 |
| Central Normal | 1 | – | 4 | – | 0 | 2 | – | 5 | – | 0 |
| Earlham | 0 | – | 5 | – | 0 | 2 | – | 5 | – | 0 |
| Valparaiso | 0 | – | 5 | – | 0 | 0 | – | 8 | – | 0 |
+ – Conference co-champions

The 1941 Ball State Cardinals football team was an American football team that represented Ball State University as a member of the Indiana Intercollegiate Conference (IIC) during the 1941 college football season. In its seventh season under head coach John Magnabosco, the team compiled a 3–2–2 record (3–1–1 against IIC opponents). The team played its home games at Cardinal Field in Muncie, Indiana.

Two Ball State players were selected by The Indianapolis News to its All-Indiana college football teams: guard Paul Miller (1st team); and end Ralph Bibler (2nd team).

Ball State was ranked at No. 229 (out of 681 teams) in the final rankings under the Litkenhous Difference by Score System.

== Schedule ==
| Date | Opponent | Site | Result | Source |
|---|---|---|---|---|
| October 4 | at Northern Illinois State* | Glidden Field; DeKalb, IL (rivalry) | T 6–6 | |
| October 10 | at Butler | Butler Bowl; Indianapolis, IN | L 6–13 | |
| October 18 | Central Michigan* | Cardinal Field; Muncie, IN | L 6–7 | |
| October 25 | at Valparaiso | Brown Field; Valparaiso, IN | W 40–0 | |
| November 1 | Manchester | Cardinal Field; Muncie, IN | T 0–0 | |
| November 8 | Central Normal | Cardinal Field; Muncie, IN | W 33–0 | |
| November 15 | at Indiana State | Terre Haute, IN (Blue Key Victory Bell) | W 7–0 | |
*Non-conference game
