= 1941 Dayton Flyers football team =

American college football season

1941 Dayton Flyers football
- Conference: Independent
- Record: 7–3
- Head coach: Harry Baujan (19th season)
- Home stadium: Dayton Stadium

1941 Midwestern college football independents records
	Conf.			Overall
Team	W	L	T	W		L		T
Western Michigan		–		8	–	0	–	0
No. 3 Notre Dame		–		8	–	0	–	1
Youngstown		–		7	–	0	–	1
Xavier		–		9	–	1	–	0
Detroit		–		7	–	2	–	0
Ohio		–		5	–	2	–	1
Dayton		–		7	–	3	–	0
Cincinnati		–		6	–	3	–	0
Akron		–		5	–	3	–	1
Michigan State		–		5	–	3	–	1
Central Michigan		–		4	–	3	–	0
Ohio Wesleyan		–		5	–	4	–	0
Michigan Tech		–		3	–	3	–	0
Marquette		–		4	–	5	–	0
Carthage		–		1	–	5	–	2
Wayne		–		2	–	6	–	0
Miami (OH)		–		2	–	7	–	0
Western Ontario		–		1	–	4	–	0
Wichita		–		1	–	6	–	1
Michigan State Normal		–		0	–	5	–	2
Detroit Tech		–		0	–	7	–	1
Rankings from AP Poll

The 1941 Dayton Flyers football team was an American football team that represented the University of Dayton as an independent during the 1941 college football season. In their 19th season under head coach Harry Baujan, the Flyers compiled a 7–3 record and outscored opponents by a total of 224 to 60.

Beno Keiter was the team captain. Key players also included halfbacks Joe Quinn and Bill Knisley.

Dayton was ranked at No. 80 (out of 681 teams) in the final rankings under the Litkenhous Difference by Score System for 1941.

== Schedule ==
Date	Opponent	Site	Result	Attendance	Source
September 19	Hillsdale	Dayton Stadium; Dayton, OH	W 62–0		
September 26	Detroit Tech	Dayton Stadium; Dayton, OH	W 75–0		
October 4	Marshall	Dayton Stadium; Dayton, OH	W 7–0		
October 11	at Tennessee	Shields–Watkins Field; Knoxville, TN	L 0–26		
October 18	Miami (OH)	Dayton Stadium; Dayton, OH	W 16–0		
October 25	at Wichita	at; Wichita, KS	W 14–6		
November 1	Cincinnati	Dayton Stadium; Dayton, OH	W 3–0	6,200	
November 9	at Xavier	Xavier Stadium; Cincinnati, OH	L 0–27	14,000	
November 15	North Dakota^{†}	Dayton Stadium; Dayton, OH	W 40–0	5,000	
November 20	at Ohio	Athens, OH	L 7–21		
^{†}Homecoming
