= 1941 Cincinnati Bearcats football team =

American college football season

1941 Cincinnati Bearcats football
- Conference: Independent
- Record: 6–3
- Head coach: Joseph A. Meyer (4th season)
- Home stadium: Nippert Stadium

1941 Midwestern college football independents records
	Conf.			Overall
Team	W	L	T	W		L		T
Western Michigan		–		8	–	0	–	0
No. 3 Notre Dame		–		8	–	0	–	1
Youngstown		–		7	–	0	–	1
Xavier		–		9	–	1	–	0
Detroit		–		7	–	2	–	0
Ohio		–		5	–	2	–	1
Dayton		–		7	–	3	–	0
Cincinnati		–		6	–	3	–	0
Akron		–		5	–	3	–	1
Michigan State		–		5	–	3	–	1
Central Michigan		–		4	–	3	–	0
Ohio Wesleyan		–		5	–	4	–	0
Michigan Tech		–		3	–	3	–	0
Marquette		–		4	–	5	–	0
Carthage		–		1	–	5	–	2
Wayne		–		2	–	6	–	0
Miami (OH)		–		2	–	7	–	0
Western Ontario		–		1	–	4	–	0
Wichita		–		1	–	6	–	1
Michigan State Normal		–		0	–	5	–	2
Detroit Tech		–		0	–	7	–	1
Rankings from AP Poll

The 1941 Cincinnati Bearcats football team was an American football team that represented the University of Cincinnati as an independent during the 1941 college football season. In its fourth season under head coach Joseph A. Meyer, the team compiled a 6–3 record. The Bearcats won their rivalry games against Louisville and Miami (OH), but lost intersectional games to Boston University and Tennessee.

Cincinnati was ranked at No. 92 (out of 681 teams) in the final rankings under the Litkenhous Difference by Score System for 1941.

== Schedule ==
Date	Opponent	Site	Result	Attendance	Source
September 20	Transylvania	Nippert Stadium; Cincinnati, OH	W 46–0	9,250	
September 27	Louisville	Nippert Stadium; Cincinnati, OH (rivalry)	W 28–7	9,000	
October 4	at Boston University	Nickerson Field; Weston, MA	L 13–14	5,000	
October 11	Wayne	Nippert Stadium; Cincinnati, OH	W 37–0	6,700	
October 18	Centre	Nippert Stadium; Cincinnati, OH	W 18–0	3,500	
October 25	at Tennessee	Shields–Watkins Field; Knoxville, TN	L 6–21	7,000	
November 1	at Dayton	University of Dayton Stadium; Dayton, OH	L 0–3	6,200	
November 8	Carnegie Tech^{†}	Nippert Stadium; Cincinnati, OH	W 20–0	8,000	
November 20	Miami (OH)	Nippert Stadium; Cincinnati, OH (Victory Bell)	W 26–0	12,000	
^{†}Homecoming
