= 1941 Indiana State Sycamores football team =

American college football season

1941 Indiana State Sycamores football
- Conference: Indiana Intercollegiate Conference
- Record: 5–2–1 (2–1–1 IIC)
- Head coach: Wally Marks (13th season)

1941 Indiana Intercollegiate Conference football standings
	Conf.					Overall
Team	W		L		T	W		L		T
Rose Poly +	4	–	0	–	0	7	–	0	–	0
Saint Joseph's (IN) +	3	–	0	–	0	8	–	0	–	1
Ball State	3	–	1	–	1	3	–	2	–	2
Butler	3	–	1	–	0	5	–	4	–	0
Wabash	4	–	2	–	0	5	–	3	–	1
DePauw	3	–	2	–	0	6	–	2	–	0
Indiana State	2	–	1	–	1	5	–	2	–	1
Evansville	2	–	1	–	1	3	–	5	–	1
Manchester	2	–	1	–	1	2	–	2	–	2
Franklin (IN)	2	–	4	–	1	2	–	5	–	1
Hanover	1	–	3	–	0	1	–	7	–	0
Central Normal	1	–	4	–	0	2	–	5	–	0
Earlham	0	–	5	–	0	2	–	5	–	0
Valparaiso	0	–	5	–	0	0	–	8	–	0
+ – Conference co-champions

The 1941 Indiana State Sycamores football team was an American football team that represented Indiana State University as a member of the Indiana Intercollegiate Conference during the 1941 college football season. In its 13th season under head coach Wally Marks, the team compiled a 5–2–1 record. The team played its home games in Terre Haute, Indiana.

Three Indiana State players were selected by The Indianapolis News to its All-Indiana college football teams: center Paul Selge (2nd team); tackle Arnold Tyler (3rd team); and guard Harry Woodard.

== Schedule ==
Date	Opponent	Site	Result	Source
September 20	at Illinois State Normal*	Bloomington, IL	W 19–6	
September 27	Manchester	Terre Haute, IN	T 0–0	
October 4	at Eastern Illinois State*	Charleston, IL	W 19–6	
October 11	Franklin (IN)^{†}	Terre Haute, IN	W 6–0	
October 18	Valparaiso	Terre Haute, IN	W 32–0	
October 25	at Grand Rapids*	Grand Rapids, MI	L 14–19	
November 1	at Michigan State Normal*	Briggs Field; Ypsilanti, MI	W 14–0	
November 15	Ball State	Terre Haute, IN	L 0–7	
*Non-conference game; ^{†}Homecoming
