= 1941 Western Ontario Mustangs football team =

College football season

1941 Western Ontario Mustangs football
- Conference: Independent
- Record: 1–4
- Head coach: John P. Metras (2nd season)

1941 Midwestern college football independents records
	Conf.			Overall
Team	W	L	T	W		L		T
Western Michigan		–		8	–	0	–	0
No. 3 Notre Dame		–		8	–	0	–	1
Youngstown		–		7	–	0	–	1
Xavier		–		9	–	1	–	0
Detroit		–		7	–	2	–	0
Ohio		–		5	–	2	–	1
Dayton		–		7	–	3	–	0
Cincinnati		–		6	–	3	–	0
Akron		–		5	–	3	–	1
Michigan State		–		5	–	3	–	1
Central Michigan		–		4	–	3	–	0
Ohio Wesleyan		–		5	–	4	–	0
Michigan Tech		–		3	–	3	–	0
Marquette		–		4	–	5	–	0
Carthage		–		1	–	5	–	2
Wayne		–		2	–	6	–	0
Miami (OH)		–		2	–	7	–	0
Western Ontario		–		1	–	4	–	0
Wichita		–		1	–	6	–	1
Michigan State Normal		–		0	–	5	–	2
Detroit Tech		–		0	–	7	–	1
Rankings from AP Poll

The 1941 Western Ontario Mustangs football team represented the University of Western Ontario as an independent during the 1941 college football season. The team was led by second-year head coach John P. Metras. The Mustangs had previously played Canadian university football, but the intercollegiate sport was suspended in Canada due to the war. In order to keep the program alive, Coach Metras decided to compete with American college teams in 1941 playing by American rules.

Prior to the start of the 1941 season, Western Ontario had not lost a game in two years against Canadian opponents. During the 1941 season, the team compiled a 1–4 record against American teams.

The 1941 Western Ontario team included only one American player, John "Bomber" Douglas of Detroit. Joe Krol scored three touchdowns for the Mustangs in their November 1 game.

== Schedule ==
Date	Opponent	Site	Result	Source
September 27	John Carroll	London, ON	L 0–27	
October 4	Lawrence Tech	London, ON	L 7–26	
October 11	Detroit Tech	London, ON	W 19–0	
October 18	Kalamazoo	London, ON	L 6–7	
November 1	Detroit freshmen	London, ON	L 18–33	
