= 1941 Miami Redskins football team =

American college football season

1941 Miami Redskins football
- Conference: Independent
- Record: 2–7
- Head coach: Frank Wilton (10th season)
- Home stadium: Miami Field

1941 Midwestern college football independents records
	Conf.			Overall
Team	W	L	T	W		L		T
Western Michigan		–		8	–	0	–	0
No. 3 Notre Dame		–		8	–	0	–	1
Youngstown		–		7	–	0	–	1
Xavier		–		9	–	1	–	0
Detroit		–		7	–	2	–	0
Ohio		–		5	–	2	–	1
Dayton		–		7	–	3	–	0
Cincinnati		–		6	–	3	–	0
Akron		–		5	–	3	–	1
Michigan State		–		5	–	3	–	1
Central Michigan		–		4	–	3	–	0
Ohio Wesleyan		–		5	–	4	–	0
Michigan Tech		–		3	–	3	–	0
Marquette		–		4	–	5	–	0
Carthage		–		1	–	5	–	2
Wayne		–		2	–	6	–	0
Miami (OH)		–		2	–	7	–	0
Western Ontario		–		1	–	4	–	0
Wichita		–		1	–	6	–	1
Michigan State Normal		–		0	–	5	–	2
Detroit Tech		–		0	–	7	–	1
Rankings from AP Poll

The 1941 Miami Redskins football team was an American football team that represented Miami University as an independent during the 1941 college football season. In their tenth and final season under head coach Frank Wilton, the Redskins compiled a 2–7 record.

Miami was ranked at No. 232 (out of 681 teams) in the final rankings under the Litkenhous Difference by Score System.

The team played its home games at Miami Field in Oxford, Ohio.

== Schedule ==
Date	Opponent	Site	Result	Attendance	Source
September 20	Hanover	Miami Field; Oxford, OH	W 53–0		
September 27	Wabash	Miami Field; Oxford, OH	W 26–0		
October 4	at Illinois	Memorial Stadium; Champaign, IL	L 0–45	20,585–21,500	
October 11	Bowling Green	Miami Field; Oxford, OH	L 0–9		
October 18	at Dayton	Dayton Stadium; Dayton, OH	L 0–16		
October 25	Ohio Wesleyan^{†}	Miami Field; Oxford, OH	L 6–26	8,000	
November 1	at Ohio	Peden Stadium; Athens, OH (rivalry)	L 0–26		
November 8	Western Reserve	Miami Field; Oxford, OH	L 13–28		
November 20	at Cincinnati	Nippert Stadium; Cincinnati, OH (Victory Bell)	L 0–26	12,000	
^{†}Homecoming
