= 1941 Toledo Rockets football team =

American college football season

1941 Toledo Rockets football
- Conference: Ohio Athletic Conference
- Record: 7–4 (2–0 OAC)
- Head coach: Clarence Spears (6th season)
- Captain: Warren Gongwer

1941 Ohio Athletic Conference football standings
	Conf.					Overall
Team	W		L		T	W		L		T
Case $	4	–	0	–	0	7	–	1	–	0
Toledo	2	–	0	–	0	7	–	4	–	0
Ohio Northern	5	–	0	–	1	6	–	1	–	1
Bowling Green	4	–	0	–	1	5	–	2	–	0
Denison	5	–	1	–	1	7	–	1	–	1
Wooster	5	–	1	–	1	5	–	1	–	1
Kenyon	4	–	1	–	0	5	–	2	–	0
Heidelberg	5	–	2	–	0	6	–	2	–	0
Otterbein	4	–	2	–	0	5	–	3	–	0
Wittenberg	3	–	4	–	0	4	–	4	–	0
Muskingum	2	–	4	–	0	3	–	5	–	0
John Carroll	1	–	2	–	1	2	–	5	–	1
Kent State	1	–	3	–	0	2	–	5	–	1
Marietta	1	–	3	–	0	1	–	6	–	0
Capital	1	–	4	–	0	2	–	4	–	1
Baldwin–Wallace	0	–	2	–	1	3	–	4	–	1
Ashland	0	–	3	–	0	0	–	5	–	0
Findlay	0	–	4	–	0	3	–	5	–	0
Oberlin	0	–	4	–	0	0	–	7	–	0
Mount Union	0	–	6	–	0	1	–	7	–	0
$ – Conference champion

The 1941 Toledo Rockets football team was an American football team that represented Toledo University in the Ohio Athletic Conference (OAC) during the 1941 college football season. In their sixth season under head coach Clarence Spears, the Rockets compiled a 7–4 record.

The team's backfield included two African-Americans, right halfback Robert Nash and left halfback Dick Huston.

Toledo was ranked at No. 142 (out of 681 teams) in the final rankings under the Litkenhous Difference by Score System for 1941.

== Schedule ==
Date	Opponent	Site	Result	Attendance	Source
September 27	Saint Joseph's (IN)*	University Stadium; Toledo, OH	L 0–3		
October 4	Detroit Tech*	University Stadium; Toledo, OH	W 55–0		
October 11	at Marshall*	Huntington, WV	L 7–33	7,500	
October 18	John Carroll	University Stadium; Toledo, OH	W 20–0	4,000	
October 25	at Western Michigan*	Waldo Stadium; Kalamazoo, MI	L 0–34		
November 1	at Illinois Wesleyan*	Bloomington, IL	W 9–0		
November 4	Camp Shelby—37th Division*	University Stadium; Toledo, OH	W 39–0	5,000	
November 8	Butler*	University Stadium; Toledo, OH	L 2–18		
November 15	Baldwin Wallace	University Stadium; Toledo, OH	W 27–7		
November 22	at Bradley*	Peoria, IL	W 14–6		
November 30	at Jefferson Barracks*	Walsh Memorial Stadium; St. Louis, MO	W 22–21	4,000	
*Non-conference game
