= 1941 Akron Zippers football team =

American college football season

1941 Akron Zippers football
- Conference: Independent
- Record: 5–3–1
- Head coach: Otis Douglas (1st season)
- Captain: Andy Maluke
- Home stadium: Rubber Bowl

1941 Midwestern college football independents records
	Conf.			Overall
Team	W	L	T	W		L		T
Western Michigan		–		8	–	0	–	0
No. 3 Notre Dame		–		8	–	0	–	1
Youngstown		–		7	–	0	–	1
Xavier		–		9	–	1	–	0
Detroit		–		7	–	2	–	0
Ohio		–		5	–	2	–	1
Dayton		–		7	–	3	–	0
Cincinnati		–		6	–	3	–	0
Akron		–		5	–	3	–	1
Michigan State		–		5	–	3	–	1
Central Michigan		–		4	–	3	–	0
Ohio Wesleyan		–		5	–	4	–	0
Michigan Tech		–		3	–	3	–	0
Marquette		–		4	–	5	–	0
Carthage		–		1	–	5	–	2
Wayne		–		2	–	6	–	0
Miami (OH)		–		2	–	7	–	0
Western Ontario		–		1	–	4	–	0
Wichita		–		1	–	6	–	1
Michigan State Normal		–		0	–	5	–	2
Detroit Tech		–		0	–	7	–	1
Rankings from AP Poll

The 1941 Akron Zippers football team was an American football team that represented the University of Akron as an independent during the 1941 college football season. In its first season under head coach Otis Douglas, the team compiled a 5–3–1 record and outscored opponents by a total of 114 to 76. Andy Maluke was the team captain.

Akron was ranked at No. 137 (out of 681 teams) in the final rankings under the Litkenhous Difference by Score System for 1941.

The team played its home games at the Rubber Bowl in Akron, Ohio

== Schedule ==
Date	Opponent	Site	Result	Attendance	Source
September 26	at Muskingum	New Concord, OH	W 10–0	2,500	
October 3	Bowling Green	Rubber Bowl; Akron, OH	W 8–0		
October 10	Western Reserve	Rubber Bowl; Akron, OH	L 6–12	8,500	
October 18	Ohio	Rubber Bowl; Akron, OH	T 0–0		
October 24	Baldwin Wallace^{†}	Rubber Bowl; Akron, OH	L 0–14		
November 1	Ohio Wesleyan	Rubber Bowl; Akron, OH	W 28–6	7,000	
November 7	at Youngstown	Rayen Stadium; Youngstown, OH (Steel Tire)	L 0–19	7,000	
November 15	Kent State	Rubber Bowl; Akron, OH (rivalry)	W 41–13		
November 20	John Carroll	Rubber Bowl; Akron, OH	W 21–12	6,635	
^{†}Homecoming
