= 1941 Detroit Titans football team =

American football team

1941 Detroit Titans football
- Conference: Independent
- Record: 7–2
- Head coach: Gus Dorais (17th season)
- Captain: Vince Banonis
- Home stadium: University of Detroit Stadium

1941 Midwestern college football independents records
	Conf.			Overall
Team	W	L	T	W		L		T
Western Michigan		–		8	–	0	–	0
No. 3 Notre Dame		–		8	–	0	–	1
Youngstown		–		7	–	0	–	1
Xavier		–		9	–	1	–	0
Detroit		–		7	–	2	–	0
Ohio		–		5	–	2	–	1
Dayton		–		7	–	3	–	0
Cincinnati		–		6	–	3	–	0
Akron		–		5	–	3	–	1
Michigan State		–		5	–	3	–	1
Central Michigan		–		4	–	3	–	0
Ohio Wesleyan		–		5	–	4	–	0
Michigan Tech		–		3	–	3	–	0
Marquette		–		4	–	5	–	0
Carthage		–		1	–	5	–	2
Wayne		–		2	–	6	–	0
Miami (OH)		–		2	–	7	–	0
Western Ontario		–		1	–	4	–	0
Wichita		–		1	–	6	–	1
Michigan State Normal		–		0	–	5	–	2
Detroit Tech		–		0	–	7	–	1
Rankings from AP Poll

The 1941 Detroit Titans football team represented the University of Detroit in the 1941 college football season. Detroit outscored its opponents by a combined total of 195 to 43, and finished with a 7–2 record in its 17th year under head coach and College Football Hall of Fame inductee, Gus Dorais. Significant games included victories over Indiana (14–7) and Oklahoma A&M (20–14) and a close loss to Arkansas (6–9).

In addition to Dorais, the team's coaching staff included Lloyd Brazil (backfield coach, 11th year), Bud Boeringer (line coach, 15th year), and Michael H. "Dad" Butler (trainer, 15th year). During a ceremony at halftime on November 8, Butler, at age 71, was honored for his many years of service as the school's trainer and track and boxing coach; he was presented with $600 in cash, a radio, a "D" blanket, a trophy, a plaque, and scrolls.

Center Vince Banonis, who was later inducted into the College Football Hall of Fame, was the team captain. At the end of the 1941 season, Banonis was chosen as a first-round All-American by Collier's Weekly (selected by Grantland Rice), International News Service, and Paramount News. He was also chosen as a second-team All-American by the Newspaper Enterprise Association.

Louis Harrington picked three Titans as first-team players on his All-Michigan football team for 1941: Vince Banonis, halfback Elmer L. "Tippy" Madarik, and guard Thomas McLoughlin.

Detroit was ranked at No. 44 (out of 681 teams) in the final rankings under the Litkenhous Difference by Score System for 1941.

== Schedule ==
Date	Opponent	Site	Result	Attendance	Source
September 27	at Indiana	Memorial Stadium; Bloomington, IN	W 14–7	10,000	
October 3	Wayne	University of Detroit Stadium; Detroit, MI	W 54–0	17,659	
October 10	Central Michigan	University of Detroit Stadium; Detroit, MI	W 45–0		
October 18	at Oklahoma A&M	Lewis Field; Stillwater, OK	W 20–14	6,000	
October 24	Arkansas	University of Detroit Stadium; Detroit, MI	L 6–9	21,202	
November 1	Manhattan	University of Detroit Stadium; Detroit, MI	W 15–0	10,131	
November 8	Marquette	University of Detroit Stadium; Detroit, MI	W 7–6	16,541	
November 16	at Villanova	Shibe Park; Philadelphia, PA	L 6–7	23,480	
November 23	at Creighton	Creighton Stadium; Omaha, NE	W 28–0		
