= 1941 Central Michigan Bearcats football team =

American college football season

1941 Central Michigan Bearcats football
- Conference: Independent
- Record: 4–3
- Head coach: Ron Finch (5th season)
- Home stadium: Alumni Field

1941 Midwestern college football independents records
	Conf.			Overall
Team	W	L	T	W		L		T
Western Michigan		–		8	–	0	–	0
No. 3 Notre Dame		–		8	–	0	–	1
Youngstown		–		7	–	0	–	1
Xavier		–		9	–	1	–	0
Detroit		–		7	–	2	–	0
Ohio		–		5	–	2	–	1
Dayton		–		7	–	3	–	0
Cincinnati		–		6	–	3	–	0
Akron		–		5	–	3	–	1
Michigan State		–		5	–	3	–	1
Central Michigan		–		4	–	3	–	0
Ohio Wesleyan		–		5	–	4	–	0
Michigan Tech		–		3	–	3	–	0
Marquette		–		4	–	5	–	0
Carthage		–		1	–	5	–	2
Wayne		–		2	–	6	–	0
Miami (OH)		–		2	–	7	–	0
Western Ontario		–		1	–	4	–	0
Wichita		–		1	–	6	–	1
Michigan State Normal		–		0	–	5	–	2
Detroit Tech		–		0	–	7	–	1
Rankings from AP Poll

The 1941 Central Michigan Bearcats football team represented Central Michigan College of Education, later renamed Central Michigan University, as an independent during the 1941 college football season. In their fifth season under head coach Ron Finch, the Bearcats compiled a 4–3 record and were outscored by their opponents by a combined total of 76 to 44. The team held six of seven opponents to fewer than seven points, but lost in a 45–0 rout against Gus Dorais' Detroit Titans.

== Schedule ==
Date	Opponent	Site	Result	Source
October 3	Northern State Teachers (MI)	Alumni Field; Mount Pleasant, MI	W 7–0	
October 10	at Detroit	University of Detroit Stadium; Detroit, MI	L 0–45	
October 18	at Ball State	Cardinal Field; Muncie, IN	W 7–0	
October 24	at Michigan State Normal	Briggs Field; Ypsilanti, MI (rivalry)	W 12–6	
November 1	at Wayne	Keyworth Stadium; Hamtramck, MI	L 0–6	
November 8	University of Grand Rapids^{†}	Alumni Field; Mount Pleasant, MI	L 6–7	
November 15	DeSales (OH)	Alumni Field; Mount Pleasant, MI	W 12–6	
^{†}Homecoming
