= 1941 Youngstown Penguins football team =

American college football season

1941 Youngstown Penguins football
- Conference: Independent
- Record: 7–0–1
- Head coach: Dike Beede (3rd season)
- Home stadium: Rayen Stadium

1941 Midwestern college football independents records
	Conf.			Overall
Team	W	L	T	W		L		T
Western Michigan		–		8	–	0	–	0
No. 3 Notre Dame		–		8	–	0	–	1
Youngstown		–		7	–	0	–	1
Xavier		–		9	–	1	–	0
Detroit		–		7	–	2	–	0
Ohio		–		5	–	2	–	1
Dayton		–		7	–	3	–	0
Cincinnati		–		6	–	3	–	0
Akron		–		5	–	3	–	1
Michigan State		–		5	–	3	–	1
Central Michigan		–		4	–	3	–	0
Ohio Wesleyan		–		5	–	4	–	0
Michigan Tech		–		3	–	3	–	0
Marquette		–		4	–	5	–	0
Carthage		–		1	–	5	–	2
Wayne		–		2	–	6	–	0
Miami (OH)		–		2	–	7	–	0
Western Ontario		–		1	–	4	–	0
Wichita		–		1	–	6	–	1
Michigan State Normal		–		0	–	5	–	2
Detroit Tech		–		0	–	7	–	1
Rankings from AP Poll

The 1941 Youngstown Penguins football team was an American football team that represented Youngstown College (now known as Youngstown State University) as an independent during the 1941 college football season. In its third season under head coach Dike Beede, the team compiled an undefeated 7–0–1 record.

Youngstown was ranked at No. 104 (out of 681 teams) in the final rankings under the Litkenhous Difference by Score System for 1941.

The team played its home games at Rayen Stadium in Youngstown, Ohio.

== Schedule ==
Date	Opponent	Site	Result	Attendance	Source
September 18	Geneva	Rayen Stadium; Youngstown, OH	T 0–0	10,000	
September 26	Ohio	Rayen Stadium; Youngstown, OH	W 14–0	9,000	
October 4	at Morris Harvey	Charleston, WV	W 12–7		
October 10	Illinois Wesleyan	Rayen Stadium; Youngstown, OH	W 25–14		
October 17	Oklahoma City	Rayen Stadium; Youngstown, OH	W 48–7	8,500	
October 25	at Waynesburg	Waynesburg, PA	W 12–0		
October 31	Tennessee Tech	Rayen Stadium; Youngstown, OH	W 14–0		
November 7	Akron	Rayen Stadium; Youngstown, OH	W 19–0	7,000	
