= 1941 Ohio Northern Polar Bears football team =

American college football season

1941 Ohio Northern Polar Bears football
- Conference: Ohio Athletic Conference
- Record: 6–1–1 (5–1 OAC)
- Head coach: Harris Lamb (11th season)

1941 Ohio Athletic Conference football standings
	Conf.					Overall
Team	W		L		T	W		L		T
Case $	4	–	0	–	0	7	–	1	–	0
Toledo	2	–	0	–	0	7	–	4	–	0
Ohio Northern	5	–	0	–	1	6	–	1	–	1
Bowling Green	4	–	0	–	1	5	–	2	–	0
Denison	5	–	1	–	1	7	–	1	–	1
Wooster	5	–	1	–	1	5	–	1	–	1
Kenyon	4	–	1	–	0	5	–	2	–	0
Heidelberg	5	–	2	–	0	6	–	2	–	0
Otterbein	4	–	2	–	0	5	–	3	–	0
Wittenberg	3	–	4	–	0	4	–	4	–	0
Muskingum	2	–	4	–	0	3	–	5	–	0
John Carroll	1	–	2	–	1	2	–	5	–	1
Kent State	1	–	3	–	0	2	–	5	–	1
Marietta	1	–	3	–	0	1	–	6	–	0
Capital	1	–	4	–	0	2	–	4	–	1
Baldwin–Wallace	0	–	2	–	1	3	–	4	–	1
Ashland	0	–	3	–	0	0	–	5	–	0
Findlay	0	–	4	–	0	3	–	5	–	0
Oberlin	0	–	4	–	0	0	–	7	–	0
Mount Union	0	–	6	–	0	1	–	7	–	0
$ – Conference champion

The 1941 Ohio Northern Polar Bears football team was an American football team that represented Ohio Northern University in the Ohio Athletic Conference (OAC) during the 1941 college football season. In their 11th and final season under head coach Harris Lamb, the Polar Bears compiled a 6–1–1 record (5–1 against OAC opponents) and outscored opponents by a total of 110 to 40.

== Schedule ==
Date	Opponent	Site	Result	Source
September 25	vs. Findlay	Robinson Field; Kenton, OH	W 7–0	
October 4	at St. Lawrence*	Canton, NY	L 0–13	
October 10	at Albion*	Albion, MI	W 25–6	
October 17	at Capital	Columbus, OH	W 27–6	
October 25	Denison^{†}	Ada, OH	T 7–7	
November 1	Muskingum	Ada, OH	W 20–0	
November 8	at Mount Union	Alliance, OH	W 14–0	
November 15	at Heidelberg	Tiffin, OH	W 10–8	
*Non-conference game; ^{†}Homecoming
