= Michigan Tech Huskies football, 1940–1949 =

American college football seasons

1940–1949 Michigan Tech Huskies football
- Conference: Independent
- Head coach: Don Sherman (1936–1942); Rex Benoit (1946); Alan Bovard (1947–1956)

The Michigan Tech Huskies football program, 1940–1949 represented the Michigan College of Mines and Technology (now known as Michigan Technological University) as an independent team during the 1940s.

Don Sherman was the head coach from 1936 to 1942. Michigan Tech did not field a football team from 1943 to 1945. The program returned in 1946 with Rex Benoit as head coach. Alan Bovard served as head coach from 1947 to 1956.

== 1940 ==
1940 Michigan Tech Huskies football
- Conference: Independent
- Record: 5–1
- Head coach: Don Sherman (5th season)

1940 Midwestern college football independents records
	Conf.			Overall
Team	W	L	T	W		L		T
Michigan Tech		–		5	–	1	–	0
Detroit		–		7	–	2	–	0
Notre Dame		–		7	–	2	–	0
Xavier		–		7	–	3	–	0
Ohio		–		5	–	2	–	2
Wayne		–		4	–	1	–	3
Dayton		–		6	–	3	–	0
Cincinnati		–		5	–	3	–	1
Wichita		–		6	–	4	–	0
Central Michigan		–		4	–	3	–	1
Marquette		–		4	–	4	–	0
Michigan State		–		3	–	4	–	1
Ohio Wesleyan		–		2	–	4	–	3
Akron		–		2	–	5	–	2
Western State Teachers		–		2	–	5	–	0
Michigan State Normal		–		1	–	5	–	1
Miami (OH)		–		0	–	7	–	1

The 1940 Michigan Tech Huskies football team represented the Michigan College of Mines and Technology (now known as Michigan Technological University) as an independent during the 1940 college football season. In their fifth season under head coach Don Sherman, the Huskies compiled a 5–1 record and outscored opponents by a total of 137 to 21.

=== Schedule ===
Date	Opponent	Site	Result	Source
September 28	at Superior State	Superior, WI	L 6–15	
October 5	Grand Grapids	Houghton, MI	W 45–0	
October 12	at Northern Michigan	Marquette, MI	W 6–0	
October 19	Mission House	Houghton, MI	W 26–0	
October 26	Northern Michigan	Houghton, MI	W 13–0	
November 2	at Northland (WI)	Ashland, WI	W 41–6	

== 1941 ==
1941 Michigan Tech Huskies football
- Conference: Independent
- Record: 3–3
- Head coach: Don Sherman (6th season)

1941 Midwestern college football independents records
	Conf.			Overall
Team	W	L	T	W		L		T
Western Michigan		–		8	–	0	–	0
No. 3 Notre Dame		–		8	–	0	–	1
Youngstown		–		7	–	0	–	1
Xavier		–		9	–	1	–	0
Detroit		–		7	–	2	–	0
Ohio		–		5	–	2	–	1
Dayton		–		7	–	3	–	0
Cincinnati		–		6	–	3	–	0
Akron		–		5	–	3	–	1
Michigan State		–		5	–	3	–	1
Central Michigan		–		4	–	3	–	0
Ohio Wesleyan		–		5	–	4	–	0
Michigan Tech		–		3	–	3	–	0
Marquette		–		4	–	5	–	0
Carthage		–		1	–	5	–	2
Wayne		–		2	–	6	–	0
Miami (OH)		–		2	–	7	–	0
Western Ontario		–		1	–	4	–	0
Wichita		–		1	–	6	–	1
Michigan State Normal		–		0	–	5	–	2
Detroit Tech		–		0	–	7	–	1
Rankings from AP Poll

The 1941 Michigan Tech Huskies football team represented the Michigan College of Mines and Technology (now known as Michigan Technological University) as an independent during the 1941 college football season. In their sixth season under head coach Don Sherman, the Huskies compiled a 3–3 record and outscored opponents by a total of 58 to 53.

=== Schedule ===
Date	Opponent	Site	Result	Source
September 27	Superior State	Houghton, MI	W 12–0	
October 4	Northland (WI)	Houghton, MI	W 32–0	
October 11	Northern Michigan	Houghton, MI	W 14–0	
October 18	at St. Norbert	De Pere, WI	L 0–9	
October 25	at Northern Michigan	Marquette, MI	L 0–25	
November 1	Shurtleff	Houghton, MI	L 0–19	

== 1942 ==
1942 Michigan Tech Huskies football
- Conference: Independent
- Record: 0–3
- Head coach: Don Sherman (7th season)

1942 Midwestern college football independents records
	Conf.			Overall
Team	W	L	T	W		L		T
Central Michigan		–		6	–	0	–	0
Western Michigan		–		5	–	1	–	0
Cincinnati		–		8	–	2	–	0
Dayton		–		8	–	2	–	0
Marquette		–		7	–	2	–	0
No. 6 Notre Dame		–		7	–	2	–	2
Ohio		–		5	–	3	–	0
Detroit		–		5	–	4	–	0
Wichita		–		5	–	4	–	0
Michigan State		–		4	–	3	–	2
Michigan State Normal		–		3	–	3	–	1
Ohio Wesleyan		–		4	–	4	–	0
Xavier		–		4	–	5	–	0
Carthage		–		3	–	4	–	0
Miami (OH)		–		3	–	6	–	0
Wayne		–		1	–	6	–	1
Akron		–		0	–	7	–	2
Michigan Tech		–		0	–	3	–	0
Rankings from AP Poll

The 1942 Michigan Tech Huskies football team represented the Michigan College of Mines and Technology (now known as Michigan Technological University) as an independent during the 1942 college football season. In their seventh season under head coach Don Sherman, the Huskies compiled a 0–3 record, scored only six points for the season, and were outscored opponents by a total of 46 to 6.

=== Schedule ===
Date	Opponent	Site	Result	Source
October 10	at Northern Michigan	Marquette, MI	L 6–26	
October 17	St. Norbert	Houghton, MI	L 0–7	
October 24	Northern Michigan	Houghton, MI	L 0–13	

== 1943–1945 ==
Michigan Tech did not field football teams between 1943 and 1945.

== 1946 ==
1946 Michigan Tech Huskies football
- Conference: Independent
- Record: 3–2
- Head coach: Rex Benoit (1st season)

1946 Midwestern non-major college football independents records
	Conf.			Overall
Team	W	L	T	W		L		T
St. Norbert		–		8	–	0	–	0
Youngstown		–		7	–	1	–	0
Bradley		–		7	–	2	–	0
Central Michigan		–		6	–	2	–	0
Defiance		–		6	–	2	–	0
Western Michigan		–		5	–	2	–	1
Miami (OH)		–		7	–	3	–	0
Dayton		–		6	–	3	–	0
Carroll (WI)		–		4	–	2	–	1
Bowling Green		–		5	–	3	–	0
Ohio Wesleyan		–		5	–	4	–	1
Michigan Tech		–		3	–	2	–	0
Northern Michigan		–		3	–	2	–	1
Michigan State Normal		–		3	–	4	–	1
Xavier		–		3	–	7	–	0
Detroit Tech		–		1	–	6	–	1
Valparaiso		–		1	–	7	–	0
Sterling		–		1	–	8	–	0
Haskell		–		0	–	7	–	0

The 1946 Michigan Tech Huskies football team represented Michigan College of Mining and Technology (later renamed Michigan Technological University) as an independent during the 1946 college football season. In their first and only year under head coach Rex Benoit, the Huskies compiled a 3–2 record and were outscored by a total of 54 to 49.

=== Schedule ===
Date	Opponent	Site	Result	Source
October 5	at Eau Claire*	Carson Park; Eau Claire, WI	L 2–34	
October 12	at Detroit Tech	Robinson Field; Detroit, MI	W 8–0	
October 19	Northern Michigan	Houghton, MI	L 13–14	
October 26	Northland (WI)	Houghton, MI	W 14–0	
November 2	at Northern Michigan	Marquette, MI	W 12–6	
*Non-conference game

== 1947 ==
1947 Michigan Tech Huskies football
- Conference: Independent
- Record: 3–3–1
- Head coach: Alan Bovard (1st season)

1947 Midwestern non-major college football independents records
	Conf.			Overall
Team	W	L	T	W		L		T
Youngstown		–		8	–	2	–	0
Ball State		–		5	–	1	–	2
Ohio Wesleyan		–		6	–	2	–	1
Wayne		–		5	–	2	–	0
Dayton		–		6	–	3	–	0
Washington University		–		5	–	3	–	0
Bowling Green		–		5	–	5	–	0
Michigan Tech		–		3	–	3	–	1
Xavier		–		4	–	4	–	1
Central Michigan		–		2	–	5	–	1
Valparaiso		–		2	–	5	–	1
Michigan State Normal		–		1	–	6	–	0

The 1947 Michigan Tech Huskies football team represented the Michigan College of Mines and Technology (now known as Michigan Technological University) as an independent during the 1947 college football season. In their first season under head coach Alan Bovard, the Huskies compiled a 3–3–1 record and were outscored by a total of 54 to 49.

=== Schedule ===
Date	Opponent	Site	Result	Source
September 27	at St. Norbert	De Pere, WI	L 7–41	
October 4	Eau Claire State	Houghton, MI	W 7–0	
October 11	at Northern Michigan	Marquette, MI	T 7–7	
October 18	Ferris Institute	Houghton, MI	L 0–2	
October 25	at Northland (WI)	Ashland, WI	W 13–0	
November 1	Northern Michigan	Houhgton, MI	W 18–7	
November 8	Duluth State	Houghton, MI	L 0–12	

== 1948 ==
1948 Michigan Tech Huskies football
- Conference: Independent
- Record: 7–0
- Head coach: Alan Bovard (2nd season)
- Captain: John Donald
- Home stadium: Sherman Field

1948 Midwestern non-major college football independents records
	Conf.			Overall
Team	W	L	T	W		L		T
Michigan Tech		–		7	–	0	–	0
Bowling Green		–		8	–	0	–	1
Washington University		–		9	–	1	–	0
John Carroll		–		7	–	1	–	2
Ashland		–		6	–	1	–	2
Ball State		–		6	–	2	–	0
Dayton		–		7	–	2	–	1
Baldwin–Wallace		–		5	–	2	–	2
Indiana State		–		4	–	4	–	0
Wabash		–		4	–	4	–	0
Wayne		–		4	–	4	–	0
Valparaiso		–		4	–	5	–	0
Toledo		–		5	–	6	–	0
Michigan State Normal		–		3	–	5	–	0
Xavier		–		4	–	6	–	0
Central Michigan		–		3	–	6	–	0

The 1948 Michigan Tech Huskies football team represented the Michigan College of Mining and Technology (later renamed Michigan Technological University) as an independent during the 1948 college football season. In their second year under head coach Alan Bovard, the Huskies compiled a perfect 7–0 record and outscored opponents by a total of 209 to 58.

The Houghton Daily Mining Gazette wrote of the Huskies' perfect season: "It is an accomplishment unique in the annals of Michigan Tech football and will stand as a monument to Coach Bovard, his staff, and the members of a great team." It was one of two perfect seasons for the Michigan Tech football program, the other occurring 26 years later by the 1974 team. Other schools compiling perfect seasons in 1948 included Michigan, Clemson, Occidental, and Alma.

Key players on the 1948 team included quarterback Carl Stenson, left halfback Dick Peterson, end John Winkel, tackles George Bianchi and John Donald, guard Jack Patek, and center Hal Smith. The team's assistant coaches were Chuck Bernard (line coach), Rex Benoit (end coach), and Ken Hawk (backfield coach).

The team played its home games on Sherman Field in Houghton, Michigan.

=== Schedule ===
Date	Opponent	Site	Result	Attendance	Source
September 18	at Duluth State	Duluth, MN	W 19–13		
September 25	Cornell (IA)	Sherman Field; Houghton, MI	W 32–14		
October 9	Detroit Tech	Sherman Field; Houghton, MI	W 33–6		
October 16	at Ferris Institute	Big Rapids, MI	W 21–6		
October 23	Northern Michigan	Sherman Field; Houghton, MI	W 44–13		
October 30	Northland (WI)	Sherman Field; Houghton, MI	W 47–0		
November 11	at Stout Institute	Nelson Field; Menomonie, WI	W 13–6		

== 1949 ==
1949 Michigan Tech Huskies football
- Conference: Independent
- Record: 4–3
- Head coach: Alan Bovard (3rd season)

1949 Midwestern college football independents records
	Conf.			Overall
Team	W	L	T	W		L		T
No. 1 Notre Dame		–		10	–	0	–	0
Ball State		–		8	–	0	–	0
Xavier		–		10	–	1	–	0
Valparaiso		–		8	–	1	–	1
Washington University		–		7	–	2	–	0
Baldwin–Wallace		–		6	–	2	–	0
Wabash		–		5	–	2	–	1
Dayton		–		6	–	3	–	0
John Carroll		–		6	–	3	–	0
No. 19 Michigan State		–		6	–	3	–	0
Toledo		–		6	–	4	–	0
Michigan Tech		–		4	–	3	–	0
Youngstown		–		4	–	3	–	1
Bowling Green		–		4	–	5	–	0
Marquette		–		4	–	5	–	0
Central Michigan		–		3	–	4	–	0
Wayne		–		3	–	5	–	0
Indiana State		–		1	–	9	–	0
Michigan State Normal		–		0	–	8	–	0
Rankings from AP Poll

The 1949 Michigan Tech Huskies football team represented the Michigan College of Mines and Technology (now known as Michigan Technological University) as an independent during the 1949 college football season. In their third season under head coach Alan Bovard, the Huskies compiled a 4–3 record and outscored opponents by a total of 162 to 121.

=== Schedule ===
Date	Opponent	Site	Result	Source
September 17	at Superior State	Superior, WI	L 18–33	
September 24	Western Illinois	Houghton, MI	L 0–33	
October 8	Central Michigan	Houghton, MI	L 6–35	
October 15	Ferris Institute	Houhgton, MI	W 28–6	
October 22	at Northern Michigan	Marquette, MI	W 27–7	
October 29	at Northland (WI)	Ashland, WI	W 57–0	
November 5	at Detroit Tech	Detroit, MI	W 26–7	
