= 1941 Western Reserve Red Cats football team =

American college football season

1941 Western Reserve Red Cats football

Big Four champion
- Conference: Big Four Conference
- Record: 7–1 (3–0 Big Four)
- Head coach: Tom Davies (1st season)
- Home stadium: League Park

The 1941 Western Reserve Red Cats football team represented the Western Reserve University, now known as Case Western Reserve University, during the 1941 college football season. The team was coached by Tom Davies, who was assisted by Coach Ken Ormiston. A notable star halfback was Dom "Mickey" Sanzotta, who also served as team co-captain with Paul Hudson.

Western Reserve was ranked at No. 96 (out of 681 teams) in the final rankings under the Litkenhous Difference by Score System for 1941.

The 50th game of the Case–Reserve rivalry, which began in 1891, was played.

== Schedule ==
Date	Opponent	Site	Result	Attendance	Source
September 27	Western Michigan*	League Park; Cleveland, OH	L 0–7	4,000	
October 4	at Ohio*	Ohio Complex; Athens, OH	W 7–0	6,000	
October 10	at Akron*	Rubber Bowl; Akron, OH	W 12–6	8,500	
October 18	Baldwin–Wallace	League Park; Cleveland, OH	W 19–0	3,000	
October 25	Kent State*	League Park; Cleveland, OH	W 20–0	3,500	
November 1	at John Carroll	Municipal Stadium; Cleveland, OH	W 27–20	4,200	
November 8	at Miami (OH)*	Miami Field; Oxford, OH	W 28–13	2,000	
November 20	vs. Case	Municipal Stadium; Cleveland, OH	W 26–6	38,872	
*Non-conference game
