= 1941 Michigan State Normal Hurons football team =

American college football season

1941 Michigan State Normal Hurons football
- Conference: Independent
- Record: 0–5–2
- Head coach: Elton Rynearson (20th season)
- Captain: Andrew L. Newlands
- Home stadium: Briggs Field

1941 Midwestern college football independents records
	Conf.			Overall
Team	W	L	T	W		L		T
Western Michigan		–		8	–	0	–	0
No. 3 Notre Dame		–		8	–	0	–	1
Youngstown		–		7	–	0	–	1
Xavier		–		9	–	1	–	0
Detroit		–		7	–	2	–	0
Ohio		–		5	–	2	–	1
Dayton		–		7	–	3	–	0
Cincinnati		–		6	–	3	–	0
Akron		–		5	–	3	–	1
Michigan State		–		5	–	3	–	1
Central Michigan		–		4	–	3	–	0
Ohio Wesleyan		–		5	–	4	–	0
Michigan Tech		–		3	–	3	–	0
Marquette		–		4	–	5	–	0
Carthage		–		1	–	5	–	2
Wayne		–		2	–	6	–	0
Miami (OH)		–		2	–	7	–	0
Western Ontario		–		1	–	4	–	0
Wichita		–		1	–	6	–	1
Michigan State Normal		–		0	–	5	–	2
Detroit Tech		–		0	–	7	–	1
Rankings from AP Poll

The 1941 Michigan State Normal Hurons football team represented Michigan State Normal College (later renamed Eastern Michigan University) as an independent during the 1941 college football season. In their 20th season under head coach Elton Rynearson, the Hurons compiled a 0–5–2 record, failed to score in five of seven games, and were outscored by all opponents by a combined total of 65 to 12. Andrew L. Newlands was the team captain. The team played its home games at Briggs Field on the school's campus in Ypsilanti, Michigan.

Michigan State Normal was ranked at No. 259 (out of 681 teams) in the final rankings under the Litkenhous Difference by Score System.

== Schedule ==
Date	Opponent	Site	Result	Attendance	Source
September 27	at Hope	Holland, MI	T 0–0		
October 4	at Illinois State Normal	Normal, IL	T 0–0		
October 11	at Kalamazoo	Kalamazoo, MI	L 0–7		
October 18	Bowling Green^{†}	Briggs Field; Ypsilanti, MI	L 6–20		
October 24	Central Michigan	Briggs Field; Ypsilanti, MI (rivalry)	L 6–12		
November 1	Indiana State	Briggs Field; Ypsilanti, MI	L 0–14		
November 8	at Wayne	Keyworth Stadium; Hamtramck, MI	L 0–12	1,500	
^{†}Homecoming
