= 1941 Notre Dame Fighting Irish football team =

American college football season

1941 Notre Dame Fighting Irish football
- Conference: Independent

Ranking
- AP: No. 3
- Record: 8–0–1
- Head coach: Frank Leahy (1st season)
- Captain: Paul Lillis
- Home stadium: Notre Dame Stadium

1941 Midwestern college football independents records
	Conf.			Overall
Team	W	L	T	W		L		T
Western Michigan		–		8	–	0	–	0
No. 3 Notre Dame		–		8	–	0	–	1
Youngstown		–		7	–	0	–	1
Xavier		–		9	–	1	–	0
Detroit		–		7	–	2	–	0
Ohio		–		5	–	2	–	1
Dayton		–		7	–	3	–	0
Cincinnati		–		6	–	3	–	0
Akron		–		5	–	3	–	1
Michigan State		–		5	–	3	–	1
Central Michigan		–		4	–	3	–	0
Ohio Wesleyan		–		5	–	4	–	0
Michigan Tech		–		3	–	3	–	0
Marquette		–		4	–	5	–	0
Carthage		–		1	–	5	–	2
Wayne		–		2	–	6	–	0
Miami (OH)		–		2	–	7	–	0
Western Ontario		–		1	–	4	–	0
Wichita		–		1	–	6	–	1
Michigan State Normal		–		0	–	5	–	2
Detroit Tech		–		0	–	7	–	1
Rankings from AP Poll

The 1941 Notre Dame Fighting Irish football team was an American football team that represented the University of Notre Dame as an independent during the 1941 college football season. In its first season under head coach Frank Leahy, Notre Dame compiled an 8–0–1 record, outscored opponents by a total of 189 to 64, and was ranked No. 3 in the final AP poll.

Tackle Paul Lillis was the team captain. Quarterback Angelo Bertelli led the team on offense and went on to win the Heisman Trophy in 1943. End Bob Dove was a consensus first-team player on the 1941 All-America team; he was later inducted into the College Football Hall of Fame. Guard Bernie Crimmins was also selected by Collier's and Liberty magazines as a first-team All-American.

== Schedule ==
Date	Opponent	Rank	Site	Result	Attendance	Source
September 27	Arizona		Notre Dame Stadium; Notre Dame, IN	W 38–7	30,000	
October 4	Indiana		Notre Dame Stadium; Notre Dame, IN	W 19–6	42,000	
October 11	at Georgia Tech		Grant Field; Atlanta, GA (rivalry)	W 20–0	31,000	
October 18	at Carnegie Tech	No. 8	Pitt Stadium; Pittsburgh, PA	W 16–0	27,719	
October 25	Illinois	No. 7	Notre Dame Stadium; Notre Dame, IN	W 49–14	45,000–48,000	
November 1	vs. No. 14 Army	No. 6	Yankee Stadium; Bronx, NY (rivalry)	T 0–0	76,000	
November 8	vs. No. 6 Navy	No. 7	Municipal Stadium; Baltimore, MD (rivalry)	W 20–13	64,795	
November 15	at No. 8 Northwestern	No. 5	Dyche Stadium; Evanston, IL (rivalry)	W 7–6	48,000	
November 22	USC	No. 4	Notre Dame Stadium; Notre Dame, IN (rivalry)	W 20–18	56,000	
Rankings from AP Poll released prior to the game

== Rankings ==
Ranking movements Legend: ██ Increase in ranking ██ Decrease in ranking ( ) = First-place votes
	Week							
Poll	1	2	3	4	5	6	7	Final
AP	8	7	6	7	5	4	4 (2)	3

== Roster ==
Captain

Name	Position	Home Town	Preparatory School	Age	Weight (in pounds)	Height	Experience (# of seasons played)	Number of Monograms won prior to this season
Ashbaugh, Russell Gilman	Left Halfback	Youngstown, Ohio	South High School	20	176	5′9″	0	0
Barry, Norman John	Left End	Chicago, Illinois	Fenwick, Oak Park	19	174	5′8.5″	1	0
Bereolos, Hercules	Right Guard	Hammond, Indiana	Hammond High School	22	193	5′11″	2	1
Bertelli, Angelo Bortolo	Left Halfback	West Springfield, Massachusetts	Cathedral High School	20	175	6′.5″	0	0
Bolger, Matthew Joseph	Right End	Newark, New Jersey	St. Benedict's Preparatory	21	190	6′1.5″	0	0
Brock, Thomas James	Center	Columbus, Nebraska	Kramer High School	21	190	6′.5″	1	0
Brosey, Henry Clifford	Right Tackle	Ozone Park, New York	Brooklyn Tech High School	22	230	6′1.5″	2	1
Brutz, James Charles	Left Tackle	Niles, Ohio	Warren, Ohio High School	22	209	6′0″	2	2
Creevy, Richard Cassell	Right Half	Chicago, Illinois	Mt. Carmel High School	20	182	6′1″	1	0
Creevy, Thomas Edwin	Quarterback	Chicago, Illinois	Mt. Carmel High School	19	185	5′11″	0	0
Crimmins, Bernard Anthony	Right Guard	Louisville, Kentucky	St. Xavier High School	22	185	5′11″	2	2
Cunningham, Paul Stanley	Center	Albany, New York	Williamsport, Pennsylvania	21	180	6′1″	0	0
Dove, Robert Leo	Left End	Youngstown, Ohio	South High School	20	188	6′1.5″	1	1
Earley, William Joseph	Quarterback	Parkersburg, West Virginia	Parkersburg High School	20	171	5′10″	1	0
Ebli, Raymond Henry	Left Tackle	Ironwood, Michigan	St. Ambrose High School	21	200	6′2″	2	1
Ellefsen, Charles Robert	Right End	Ironwood, Michigan	Wright High School	20	183	6′1″	0	0
Evans, Fred Owen Jr.	Fullback	South Bend, Indiana	Riley High School	21	174	5′11″	1	1
Filley, Patrick Joseph	Left Guard	South Bend, Indiana	Central High School	19	178	5′8″	0	0
Girolami, Anthony Gregory	Quarterback	Chicago, Illinois	Crane Tech High School	20	193	6′.5″	1	0
Hargrave, Robert Webb	Quarterback	Evansville, Indiana	Reitz Memorial High School	21	172	5′11″	2	2
Hines, Michael Leo	Right Tackle	Kewanna, Indiana	Kewanna High School	21	215	6′3″	2	0
Hogan, Donald John	Left Halfback	Chicago, Illinois	St. Ignatius High School	20	189	6′2″	1	0
Juzwik, Steve Robert	Right Halfback	Chicago, Illinois	DePaul Academy	23	185	5′8.5″	2	1
Kovatch, John George	Right End	South Bend, Indiana	Washington High School	21	181	6′2.5″	2	1
Kudlacz, Stanley Adam	Center	Chicago, Illinois	DePaul Academy	19	187	5′9″	0	0
Laiber, Joseph James	Right Guard	South Bend, Indiana	Washington High School	21	175	5′10″	2	1
Lanahan, John Francis	Center	Jacksonville, Florida	Immaculate Conception	20	188	6′1.5″	1	0
Lillis, Paul Bernard	Right Tackle	Mt. Vernon, New York	Bennett, Buffalo New York	20	210	6′2″	2	2
Maddock, Robert Charles	Left Guard	Santa Ana, California	Santa Ana High School	21	202	6′0″	2	1
McBride, Robert James	Left Guard	Lancaster, Ohio	Logan High School	18	205	6′0″	0	0
McGinnis, John James	Right End	Chicago, Illinois	St. George, Evanston, Illinois	19	185	6′2″	0	0
McLaughlin, David Tennant	Right Guard	South Orange, New Jersey	Columbia High School	18	190	5′11″	0	0
McNeill, Edward Charles	Fullback	Midland, Pennsylvania	Lincoln High School	22	193	6′1.5″	2	0
Miller, Creighton Eugene	Fullback	Wilmington, Delaware	Alexis I. DuPont	18	192	6′1″	0	0
Miller, Thomas Seeay	Right Halfback	Wilmington Delaware	Alexis I. DuPont	20	183	6′1″	1	0
Murphy, George Edwards	Right End	South Bend, Indiana	Central High School	20	176	6′0″	1	0
Neff, Robert Hudkins	Right Tackle	Buckhannon, West Virginia	Buckhannon-Upshur High School	21	230	6′1.5″	1	1
O'Brien, Richard Charles	Right End	Peoria, Illinois	Spalding Institute	20	178	6′2″	1	0
O'Reilly, Martin Gordon	Center	Chicago, Illinois	Mt. Carmel High School	20	185	6′2″	2	1
Patten, Paul Edwards	Quarterback	Canton, New York	Canton High School	20	178	5′8″	2	0
Peasenelli, John Joseph	Right Halfback	Rochester, Pennsylvania	Rochester High School	21	176	5′10.5″	1	0
Perko, Thomas William	Left End	Chisholm, Minnesota	Chisholm High School	20	185	6′1.5″	1	0
Postpupack, Joseph Victor	Fullback	McAdoo, Pennsylvania	McAdoo High School	21	190	6′0″	2	0
Prokop, Joseph Michael	Fullback	Cleveland, Ohio	Catholic Latin High School	21	196	6′1″	2	0
Riordan, Wilbur Eugene	Right Guard	Sioux City, Iowa	East High School	22	180	5′10.5″	1	0
Rymkus, Louis	Left Tackle	Chicago, Illinois	Tilden High School	21	225	6′4″	1	0
Smyth, William Krantz	Left End	Cincinnati, Ohio	Roger Bacon High School	19	208	6′3″	0	0
Sullivan, Edward Joseph	Left Guard	Belle Harbor, New York	St. John's, Brooklyn	21	198	5′9.5″	2	0
Sullivan, Lawrence Patrick	Left Tackle	Brockton Massachusetts	Tilton, New Hampshire Preparatory	21	210	6′2″	1	0
Tessaro, Ed Alexander	Right Halfback	Greensburg, Pennsylvania	Franklin & Marshall Academy	21	190	5′11.5″	0	0
Walsh, Robert Michael	Right Guard	Springfield, Illinois	Cathedral High School	22	193	5′11″	1	0
Warner, John Andrew Jr.	Left Halfback	New Haven, Connecticut	Cheshire Academy	20	181	6′0″	1	0
Webb, Robert Bailey	Right Guard	Santa Ana, California	Santa Ana High School	20	190	5′10″	1	0
Wright, Harry Charles	Quarterback	Hempstead, Long Island New York	Chaminade, Mineola	21	188	6'0″	1	0
Ziemba, Walter John	Center	Hammond, Indiana	Hammond High School	22	228	6′2.5″	1	1
