= Phil Brown (American football) =

American sports coach (1901–1991)

Biographical details
- Born: March 14, 1901; Indianapolis, Indiana, U.S.
- Died: May 16, 1991 (aged 90)

Playing career

Football
- 1919–1922: Butler

Coaching career (HC unless noted)

Football
- 1923–1925: Marshall HS (IL)
- 1926–1927: Washington College
- 1928–1942: Rose Poly
- 1944: Indiana State
- 1946–1958: Rose Poly

Basketball
- 1928–1932: Rose Poly
- 1935–1943: Rose Poly

Head coaching record
- Overall: 106–127–8 (college football); 56–95 (college basketball)

Accomplishments and honors

Championships
- Football; 1 ICC (1941); 3 Prairie (1953, 1957–1958)

Phil Brown (March 14, 1901 – May 16, 1991) was an American football, basketball, and track coach. He served as the head football coach at Washington College in Chestertown, Maryland from 1927 to 1927, Rose Polytechnic Institute—now known as Rose-Hulman Institute of Technology from 1928 to 1942 and again from 1946 to 1958, and Indiana State Teachers College—now known as Indiana State University in 1944. Brown also coached basketball and track at Rose Poly before retiring in 1959.

Brown graduated from Arsenal Technical High School in Indianapolis, Indiana in 1918 and then played college football at Butler University. He died on May 16, 1991.

== Head coaching record ==
=== College football ===
Year	Team	Overall	Conference	Standing	Bowl/playoffs
Washington College Shoremen (Independent) (1926–1927)
1926	Washington College	1–8			
1927	Washington College	1–8			
Washington College:		2–16			
Rose Poly Engineers (Indiana Intercollegiate Conference) (1928)
1928	Rose Poly	0–6			
1929	Rose Poly	4–4			
1930	Rose Poly	7–1			
1931	Rose Poly	6–2			
1932	Rose Poly	5–3			
1933	Rose Poly	0–8	0–8	15th	
1934	Rose Poly	2–6	1–5	13th	
1935	Rose Poly	2–5	1–5	13th	
1936	Rose Poly	2–5	1–5	14th	
1937	Rose Poly	4–4	2–4	10th	
1938	Rose Poly	5–3	2–1	T–4th	
1939	Rose Poly	5–3–1	3–1–1	4th	
1940	Rose Poly	5–3	4–1	T–3rd	
1941	Rose Poly	7–0	4–0	T–1st	
1942	Rose Poly	5–1	4–1	T–3rd	
Indiana State Sycamores (Indiana Intercollegiate Conference) (1944)
1944	Indiana State	5–2–1			
Indiana State:		5–2–1			
Rose Poly Engineers (Indiana Intercollegiate Conference) (1946)
1946	Rose Poly	1–7–1	1–5	14th	
Rose Poly Engineers (Hoosier Conference) (1947–1949)
1947	Rose Poly	0–7–1	0–4	8th	
1948	Rose Poly	3–3–1	1–3–1	T–5th	
1949	Rose Poly	4–3–1	1–3–1	8th	
Rose Poly Engineers (Independent) (1950–1952)
1950	Rose Poly	0–8			
1951	Rose Poly	2–5			
1952	Rose Poly	3–4–1			
Rose Poly Engineers (Prairie College Conference) (1953–1958)
1953	Rose Poly	6–2		1st	
1954	Rose Poly	2–5			
1955	Rose Poly	1–6–1	1–2	T–3rd	
1956	Rose Poly	3–4			
1957	Rose Poly	7–1		1st	
1958	Rose Poly	8–0		1st	
Rose Poly:		99–109–7			
Total:		106–127–8			
National championship Conference title Conference division title or championship game berth
