= 1941 Northern Illinois State Huskies football team =

American college football season

1941 Northern Illinois State Huskies football

IIAC co-champion
- Conference: Illinois Intercollegiate Athletic Conference
- Record: 7–1–1 (3–1 IIAC)
- Head coach: Chick Evans (13th season)
- Captain: Fred Spear
- Home stadium: Glidden Field

1941 Illinois Intercollegiate Athletic Conference football standings
	Conf.					Overall
Team	W		L		T	W		L		T
Northern Illinois State +	3	–	1	–	0	7	–	1	–	1
Illinois State Normal +	3	–	1	–	0	3	–	4	–	2
Southern Illinois	2	–	1	–	1	5	–	2	–	1
Western Illinois	1	–	2	–	1	3	–	4	–	1
Eastern Illinois	0	–	4	–	0	0	–	7	–	0
Eureka	0	–	0	–	0	3	–	3	–	1
+ – Conference co-champions

The 1941 Northern Illinois State Huskies football team represented Northern Illinois State Teachers College—now known as Northern Illinois University—as a member of the Illinois Intercollegiate Athletic Conference (IIAC) during the 1941 college football season. Led by 13th-year head coach Chick Evans, the Huskies compiled an overall record of 7–1–1 with a mark of 3–1 in conference play, sharing the IIAC title with Illinois State Normal. The team played home games at the 5,500-seat Glidden Field, located on the east end of campus, in DeKalb, Illinois.

== Schedule ==
Date	Opponent	Site	Result	Attendance	Source
September 27	at Whitewater State*	Whitewater, WI	W 14–0		
October 4	Ball State*	Glidden Field; DeKalb, IL (rivalry)	T 6–6		
October 11	Illinois State Normal^{†}	Glidden Field; DeKalb, IL	W 6–0	3,000	
October 18	Wheaton (IL)*	Glidden Field; DeKalb, IL	W 24–0		
October 25	at Oshkosh State*	Oshkosh, WI	W 33–6	1,300	
November 1	at Southern Illinois	McAndrew Stadium; Carbondale, IL	L 7–13		
November 8	Stevens Point*	Glidden Field; DeKalb, IL	W 32–12		
November 15	at Eastern Illinois	Charleston, IL	W 7–15		
November 20	at Western Illinois	Macomb, IL	W 25–7		
*Non-conference game; ^{†}Homecoming
