= 1941 Xavier Musketeers football team =

American college football season

1941 Xavier Musketeers football
- Conference: Independent
- Record: 9–1
- Head coach: Clem Crowe (7th season)
- Home stadium: Xavier Stadium

1941 Midwestern college football independents records
	Conf.			Overall
Team	W	L	T	W		L		T
Western Michigan		–		8	–	0	–	0
No. 3 Notre Dame		–		8	–	0	–	1
Youngstown		–		7	–	0	–	1
Xavier		–		9	–	1	–	0
Detroit		–		7	–	2	–	0
Ohio		–		5	–	2	–	1
Dayton		–		7	–	3	–	0
Cincinnati		–		6	–	3	–	0
Akron		–		5	–	3	–	1
Michigan State		–		5	–	3	–	1
Central Michigan		–		4	–	3	–	0
Ohio Wesleyan		–		5	–	4	–	0
Michigan Tech		–		3	–	3	–	0
Marquette		–		4	–	5	–	0
Carthage		–		1	–	5	–	2
Wayne		–		2	–	6	–	0
Miami (OH)		–		2	–	7	–	0
Western Ontario		–		1	–	4	–	0
Wichita		–		1	–	6	–	1
Michigan State Normal		–		0	–	5	–	2
Detroit Tech		–		0	–	7	–	1
Rankings from AP Poll

The 1941 Xavier Musketeers football team was an American football team that represented Xavier University as an independent during the 1941 college football season. In its seventh season under head coach Clem Crowe, the team compiled a 9–1 record and outscored opponents by a total of 257 to 47.

Xavier was ranked at No. 52 (out of 681 teams) in the final rankings under the Litkenhous Difference by Score System for 1941.

The team played its home games at Xavier Stadium in Cincinnati. Halfback Chet Mutryn starred on offense for Xavier.

== Schedule ==
Date	Opponent	Site	Result	Attendance	Source
September 19	Georgetown (KY)	Xavier Stadium; Cincinnati, OH	W 63–6	8,000	
September 26	Butler	Xavier Stadium; Cincinnati, OH	W 40–7	8,000	
October 5	at Saint Vincent (PA)	Bearcat Stadium; Latrobe, PA	W 21–7	5,214	
October 12	at John Carroll	Cleveland, OH	W 25–0	5,000	
October 18	Kentucky	Xavier Stadium; Cincinnati, OH	L 6–21	11,000	
October 24	at Saint Louis	Walsh Stadium; St. Louis, MO	W 8–0	7,450	
November 2	Niagara	Xavier Stadium; Cincinnati, OH	W 20–0	8,000	
November 9	Dayton	Xavier Stadium; Cincinnati, OH	W 27–0	14,000	
November 20	Providence	Xavier Stadium; Cincinnati, OH	W 33–0	6,500	
November 29	Georgetown (DC)	Xavier Stadium; Cincinnati, OH	W 14–9	12,000	
