= 1941 Butler Bulldogs football team =

American college football season

1941 Butler Bulldogs football
- Conference: Indiana Intercollegiate Conference
- Record: 5–4 (3–1 IIC)
- Head coach: Tony Hinkle (3rd season)
- Captain: Bob Roberts
- Home stadium: Butler Bowl

1941 Indiana Intercollegiate Conference football standings
| | Conf. | | | | | Overall |
| Team | W | | L | | T | W | | L | | T |
|---|---|---|---|---|---|---|---|---|---|---|
| Rose Poly + | 4 | – | 0 | – | 0 | 7 | – | 0 | – | 0 |
| Saint Joseph's (IN) + | 3 | – | 0 | – | 0 | 8 | – | 0 | – | 1 |
| Ball State | 3 | – | 1 | – | 1 | 3 | – | 2 | – | 2 |
| Butler | 3 | – | 1 | – | 0 | 5 | – | 4 | – | 0 |
| Wabash | 4 | – | 2 | – | 0 | 5 | – | 3 | – | 1 |
| DePauw | 3 | – | 2 | – | 0 | 6 | – | 2 | – | 0 |
| Indiana State | 2 | – | 1 | – | 1 | 5 | – | 2 | – | 1 |
| Evansville | 2 | – | 1 | – | 1 | 3 | – | 5 | – | 1 |
| Manchester | 2 | – | 1 | – | 1 | 2 | – | 2 | – | 2 |
| Franklin (IN) | 2 | – | 4 | – | 1 | 2 | – | 5 | – | 1 |
| Hanover | 1 | – | 3 | – | 0 | 1 | – | 7 | – | 0 |
| Central Normal | 1 | – | 4 | – | 0 | 2 | – | 5 | – | 0 |
| Earlham | 0 | – | 5 | – | 0 | 2 | – | 5 | – | 0 |
| Valparaiso | 0 | – | 5 | – | 0 | 0 | – | 8 | – | 0 |
+ – Conference co-champions

The 1941 Butler Bulldogs football team was an American football team that represented Butler University as a member of the Indiana Intercollegiate Conference (IIC) during the 1941 college football season. In its third season under head coach Tony Hinkle, the team compiled a 5–4 record. The team played its home games at the Butler Bowl in Indianapolis.

Six Butler players were selected by The Indianapolis News to its All-Indiana college football teams: center Zane Powell (1st team); end Robert Roberts (1st team); back Boris Dimancheff (1st team); guard Lowell Toelle (2nd team); tackle Dan Zavella (2nd team); and end Harold Miller (3rd team).

Butler was ranked at No. 145 (out of 681 teams) in the final rankings under the Litkenhous Difference by Score System for 1941.

== Schedule ==
| Date | Opponent | Site | Result | Attendance | Source |
|---|---|---|---|---|---|
| September 19 | Saint Joseph's (IN) | Butler Bowl; Indianapolis, IN | L 6–13 | 8,000 | |
| September 26 | at Xavier* | Xavier Stadium; Cincinnati, OH | L 7–40 | 8,000 | |
| October 3 | Western Michigan* | Butler Bowl; Indianapolis, IN | L 6–14 | 3,500 | |
| October 10 | Ball State | Butler Bowl; Indianapolis, IN | W 13–6 | | |
| October 18 | at DePauw | Blackstock Memorial Stadium; Greencastle, IN | W 20–6 | 3,000 | |
| October 25 | Ohio* | Butler Bowl; Indianapolis, IN | L 7–20 | 8,500 | |
| November 1 | Wabash | Butler Bowl; Indianapolis, IN | W 26–0 | | |
| November 8 | at Toledo* | Toledo, OH | W 18–2 | | |
| November 15 | Washington University* | Butler Bowl; Indianapolis, IN | W 40–13 | 9,000 | |
*Non-conference game
