= 1941 Western Michigan Broncos football team =

American college football season

1941 Western Michigan Broncos football
- Conference: Independent
- Record: 8–0
- Head coach: Mike Gary (13th season)
- MVP: Horace Coleman
- Captain: Bob Metzger
- Home stadium: Waldo Stadium

1941 Midwestern college football independents records
	Conf.			Overall
Team	W	L	T	W		L		T
Western Michigan		–		8	–	0	–	0
No. 3 Notre Dame		–		8	–	0	–	1
Youngstown		–		7	–	0	–	1
Xavier		–		9	–	1	–	0
Detroit		–		7	–	2	–	0
Ohio		–		5	–	2	–	1
Dayton		–		7	–	3	–	0
Cincinnati		–		6	–	3	–	0
Akron		–		5	–	3	–	1
Michigan State		–		5	–	3	–	1
Central Michigan		–		4	–	3	–	0
Ohio Wesleyan		–		5	–	4	–	0
Michigan Tech		–		3	–	3	–	0
Marquette		–		4	–	5	–	0
Carthage		–		1	–	5	–	2
Wayne		–		2	–	6	–	0
Miami (OH)		–		2	–	7	–	0
Western Ontario		–		1	–	4	–	0
Wichita		–		1	–	6	–	1
Michigan State Normal		–		0	–	5	–	2
Detroit Tech		–		0	–	7	–	1
Rankings from AP Poll

The 1941 Western Michigan Broncos football team was an American football team that represented Michigan College of Education (later renamed Western Michigan University) as an independent during the 1941 college football season. In their 13th and final season under head coach Mike Gary, the Hilltoppers compiled an 8–0 record, shut out four opponents, and outscored all opponents by a combined total of 183 to 27. The team played its home games at Waldo Stadium in Kalamazoo, Michigan.

End Bob Metzger was the team captain. For the second consecutive year, halfback Horace Coleman received the team's most outstanding player award.

Western Michigan was ranked at No. 85 (out of 681 teams) in the final rankings under the Litkenhous Difference by Score System for 1941.

With the United States entry into World War II after the Attack on Pearl Harbor, Mike Gary left his position as head football coach at Western Michigan and served three years in the Naval Air Corps with the rank of commander.

== Schedule ==
Date	Opponent	Site	Result	Attendance	Source
September 27	at Western Reserve	League Park; Cleveland	W 7–0	4,000	
October 3	at Butler	Butler Bowl; Indianapolis, IN	W 14–6	3,500	
October 18	at Iowa State Teachers	O. R. Latham Stadium; Cedar Falls, IA	W 28–7	6,000	
October 25	Toledo	Waldo Stadium; Kalamazoo, MI	W 34–0		
November 1	Western Kentucky State Teachers	Waldo Stadium; Kalamazoo, MI	W 21–7		
November 8	Manchester (IN)	Waldo Stadium; Kalamazoo, MI	W 12–0		
November 15	at Wayne	Keyworth Stadium; Detroit	W 34–0	10,000	
November 20	Ripon	Waldo Stadium; Kalamazoo, MI	W 33–7		
