= 1941 Ohio Bobcats football team =

American college football season

1941 Ohio Bobcats football
- Conference: Independent
- Record: 5–2–1
- Head coach: Don Peden (18th season)
- Home stadium: Ohio Stadium

1941 Midwestern college football independents records
	Conf.			Overall
Team	W	L	T	W		L		T
Western Michigan		–		8	–	0	–	0
No. 3 Notre Dame		–		8	–	0	–	1
Youngstown		–		7	–	0	–	1
Xavier		–		9	–	1	–	0
Detroit		–		7	–	2	–	0
Ohio		–		5	–	2	–	1
Dayton		–		7	–	3	–	0
Cincinnati		–		6	–	3	–	0
Akron		–		5	–	3	–	1
Michigan State		–		5	–	3	–	1
Central Michigan		–		4	–	3	–	0
Ohio Wesleyan		–		5	–	4	–	0
Michigan Tech		–		3	–	3	–	0
Marquette		–		4	–	5	–	0
Carthage		–		1	–	5	–	2
Wayne		–		2	–	6	–	0
Miami (OH)		–		2	–	7	–	0
Western Ontario		–		1	–	4	–	0
Wichita		–		1	–	6	–	1
Michigan State Normal		–		0	–	5	–	2
Detroit Tech		–		0	–	7	–	1
Rankings from AP Poll

The 1941 Ohio Bobcats football team was an American football team that represented Ohio University as an independent during the 1941 college football season. In their 18th season under head coach Don Peden, the Bobcats compiled a 5–2–1 record and outscored opponents by a total of 108 to 42.

Ohio was ranked at No. 110 (out of 681 teams) in the final rankings under the Litkenhous Difference by Score System for 1941.

The team played its home games at Ohio Stadium (later renamed Peden Stadium) in Athens, Ohio.

== Schedule ==
Date	Opponent	Site	Result	Attendance	Source
September 26	at Youngstown	Rayen Stadium; Youngstown, OH	L 0–14	9,000	
October 4	Western Reserve	Ohio Stadium; Athens, OH	L 0–7		
October 11	Western Kentucky State Teachers	Ohio Stadium; Athens, OH	W 20–7	7,000	
October 18	at Akron	Rubber Bowl; Akron, OH	T 0–0		
October 25	at Butler	Butler Bowl; Indianapolis, IN	W 20–7	8,500	
November 1	Miami (OH)^{†}	Ohio Stadium; Athens, OH (rivalry)	W 26–0		
November 8	at Ohio Wesleyan	Delaware, OH	W 21–0	7,500	
November 20	Dayton	Ohio Stadium; Athens, OH	W 21–7		
^{†}Homecoming
