= Julius Goldman =

Short description

Biographical details
- Born: September 22, 1910; Mayesville, South Carolina, U.S.
- Died: February 19, 2001 (aged 90); Royal Oak, Michigan, U.S.

Playing career

Football
- c. 1928–1931: Detroit Tech

Basketball
- c. 1928–1932: Detroit Tech
- Positions: Quarterback (football); Forward (basketball)

Coaching career (HC unless noted)

Football
- 1936–1940: Detroit Tech (assistant)
- 1941: Detroit Tech

Basketball
- 1932–1944: Detroit Tech
- 1936: Canada (assistant)

Administrative career (AD unless noted)
- 1941–1944: Detroit Tech

Head coaching record
- Overall: 0–7–1 (football); 143–75 (basketball)

Julius "Goldie" Goldman (September 22, 1910 – February 19, 2001) was an American-Canadian football and basketball player, coach, and referee, college athletics administrator, engineer, and educator. He played several sports at the Detroit Institute of Technology (Detroit Tech), before serving as the school's head basketball coach, head football coach, and athletic director. Goldman was also an assistant coach for the Canadian basketball team at the 1936 Summer Olympics and Canada's representative on the 1936 Olympic Basketball Rules Committee. His suggestion to a eliminate the jump ball after every field goal was adopted, and contributed to the modernization of the game. Goldman worked as a munitions engineer during World War II and then as an engineering executive after the war. He taught math at Detroit Tech and later at Oakland Community College in Oakland County, Michigan. Goldman was also a longtime basketball and football official for the Detroit Catholic Schools Association.

== Early life and college career ==
Goldman was born in 1910 in Mayesville, South Carolina to Lithuanian immigrants Isaac and Rebecca Goldman. The family moved to Edmonton, Alberta, Canada when Goldman was two, and then relocated shortly thereafter to Windsor, Ontario.

Goldman attended Windsor-Walkerville Tech—later known as W. D. Lowe High School—in Windsor, where he starred in four sports: basketball, baseball, ice hockey, and track. After high school, he returned to the United States to attend the Detroit Institute of Technology. There he lettered in football, basketball, baseball, and track before graduating in 1932 with a Bachelor of Science degree. In 1932, Goldman led college basketball in scoring.

== Coaching, teaching, officiating, and engineering career ==
Goldman began coaching basketball at his alma mater, Detroit Tech, in 1932 as an assistant under head basketball coach Walter Porosky. He also taught math at the school.

Goldman captained and was the leading scorer for the Windsor Ford V-8's team that won Canada's 1935–36 national championship, qualifying them to represent Canada in the 1936 Summer Olympics. The 1936 games marked basketball's first appearance in the Olympics. However, Goldman's American citizenship made him ineligible to play for another country, so he was made an assistant coach and appointed Canada's representative to the Olympic Basketball Rules Committee. The Canadian basketball team won the silver medal, losing 19–8 to the United States in the gold medal game, which was played outdoors in a driving rainstorm.

As representative on the Olympic Basketball Rules Committee, Goldman suggested the elimination of a rule that called for a jump ball following every made field goal. The Rules Committee adopted his suggestion with the lone objecting vote coming from basketball's creator, James Naismith. This rule change has been credited with modernizing basketball, speeding up the pace of the game, increasing scoring, and making teams with shorter centers more competitive. In 1958, National Collegiate Athletic Association (NCAA) rules committee chairman Ed Steitz credited Goldman's rule change as the most radical change in the entire evolution of basketball.

In 1941, he succeeded Hal Shields as Detroit Tech's athletic director and head football coach. He had assisted Shields with coaching the football team for five seasons. In the fall of 1944, Goldman resigned his post at Detroit Tech to a take a position with Smith, Hinchman & Grylls—now known as SmithGroup, an engineering firm in Detroit. Detroit Tech had discontinued its football program after the 1941 season, and dropped basketball as well for the 1944–45 season after Goldman's resignation. Goldman led Detroit Tech's basketball teams to a record of 143–75, including a 16–4 mark in his final season, 1943–44.

Goldman worked for Smith, Hinchman & Grylls as a ammunition designer. He developed the 155 mm howitzer anti-tank shell that to Germany's "invincible" Tiger tanks during World War II. Goldman was later an executive with Federal Engineering and Fisher Body in Detroit before retiring in 1965. In 1970, he resumed his teaching career at Oakland Community College, instructing math until he retired for good in 1995. For 43 years, Goldman officiated basketball and football for the Detroit Catholic Schools Association.

== Family and death ==
Goldman was married to Ann Warsh Goldman (1913–1990). They had two children—a son, Alan (1940–2011), and daughter, Nancy Kushkin (born 1944)—and seven grandchildren.

Goldman died on February 19, 2001, at William Beaumont Hospital in Royal Oak, Michigan.

== Awards ==
- 1950: Mensa membership
- 1969: named Official of the Year by the Detroit Catholic Schools Association
- 1973: named top student-athlete of the century (1872–1972) at W.D. Lowe Secondary School
- 1978: inducted to Detroit Catholic High School League Hall of Fame
- 1981: inducted to Canadian Basketball Hall of Fame
- 1990: nducted to the Windsor-Essex County Sports Hall of Fame
- 1991: inducted to Michigan Jewish Sports Hall of Fame
- 1999: inducted to International Jewish Sports Hall of Fame
- 2017: inducted to Lawrence Tech (formerly Detroit Tech) Hall of Fame

== Head coaching record ==
=== Football ===
| Year | Team | Overall | Conference | Standing | Bowl/playoffs |
|---|---|---|---|---|---|
Detroit Tech Dynamics (Independent) (1941)
| 1941 | Detroit Tech | 0–7–1 | | | |
| Detroit Tech: | | 0–7–1 | | | |
| Total: | | 0–7–1 | | | |

== See also ==
- Basketball at the 1936 Summer Olympics
