= 1941 Case Rough Riders football team =

American college football season

1941 Case Rough Riders football

OAC champion
- Conference: Ohio Athletic Conference
- Record: 7–1 (4–0 OAC)
- Head coach: Ray A. Ride (12th season)
- Home stadium: Shaw Stadium

1941 Ohio Athletic Conference football standings
	Conf.					Overall
Team	W		L		T	W		L		T
Case $	4	–	0	–	0	7	–	1	–	0
Toledo	2	–	0	–	0	7	–	4	–	0
Ohio Northern	5	–	0	–	1	6	–	1	–	1
Bowling Green	4	–	0	–	1	5	–	2	–	0
Denison	5	–	1	–	1	7	–	1	–	1
Wooster	5	–	1	–	1	5	–	1	–	1
Kenyon	4	–	1	–	0	5	–	2	–	0
Heidelberg	5	–	2	–	0	6	–	2	–	0
Otterbein	4	–	2	–	0	5	–	3	–	0
Wittenberg	3	–	4	–	0	4	–	4	–	0
Muskingum	2	–	4	–	0	3	–	5	–	0
John Carroll	1	–	2	–	1	2	–	5	–	1
Kent State	1	–	3	–	0	2	–	5	–	1
Marietta	1	–	3	–	0	1	–	6	–	0
Capital	1	–	4	–	0	2	–	4	–	1
Baldwin–Wallace	0	–	2	–	1	3	–	4	–	1
Ashland	0	–	3	–	0	0	–	5	–	0
Findlay	0	–	4	–	0	3	–	5	–	0
Oberlin	0	–	4	–	0	0	–	7	–	0
Mount Union	0	–	6	–	0	1	–	7	–	0
$ – Conference champion

The 1941 Case Rough Riders football team represented the Case School of Applied Science in the American city of Cleveland, Ohio, now a part of Case Western Reserve University, during the 1941 college football season. The team was coached by Ray A. Ride, for whom the team mascot was named. The Case–Reserve rivalry game saw its 50th matchup, which began in 1891.

Case was ranked at No. 118 (out of 681 teams) in the final rankings under the Litkenhous Difference by Score System for 1941.

== Schedule ==
Date	Opponent	Site	Result	Attendance	Source
October 4	at Lehigh*	Taylor Stadium; Bethlehem, PA	W 33–26		
October 10	Kent State	Shaw Stadium; East Cleveland, OH	W 7–6	4,500	
October 18	at Wooster	Wooster, OH	W 40–0		
October 25	at John Carroll	Shaw Stadium; East Cleveland, OH	W 8–6		
November 1	at Carnegie Tech*	Shaw Stadium; East Cleveland, OH	W 27–0		
November 8	at Baldwin–Wallace	Berea, OH	W 35–7	7,500	
November 15	at Ohio Wesleyan*	Delaware, OH	W 7–0		
November 20	vs. Western Reserve*	Municipal Stadium; Cleveland, OH	L 6–26	38,872	
*Non-conference game
