= 1941 Marquette Hilltoppers football team =

American college football season

1941 Marquette Hilltoppers football
- Conference: Independent
- Record: 4–5
- Head coach: Thomas E. Stidham (1st season)
- Home stadium: Marquette Stadium

1941 Midwestern college football independents records
	Conf.			Overall
Team	W	L	T	W		L		T
Western Michigan		–		8	–	0	–	0
No. 3 Notre Dame		–		8	–	0	–	1
Youngstown		–		7	–	0	–	1
Xavier		–		9	–	1	–	0
Detroit		–		7	–	2	–	0
Ohio		–		5	–	2	–	1
Dayton		–		7	–	3	–	0
Cincinnati		–		6	–	3	–	0
Akron		–		5	–	3	–	1
Michigan State		–		5	–	3	–	1
Central Michigan		–		4	–	3	–	0
Ohio Wesleyan		–		5	–	4	–	0
Michigan Tech		–		3	–	3	–	0
Marquette		–		4	–	5	–	0
Carthage		–		1	–	5	–	2
Wayne		–		2	–	6	–	0
Miami (OH)		–		2	–	7	–	0
Western Ontario		–		1	–	4	–	0
Wichita		–		1	–	6	–	1
Michigan State Normal		–		0	–	5	–	2
Detroit Tech		–		0	–	7	–	1
Rankings from AP Poll

The 1941 Marquette Hilltoppers football team was an American football team that represented Marquette University as an independent during the 1941 college football season. In its first season under head coach Thomas E. Stidham, the team compiled a 4–5 record and outscored opponents by a total of 162 to 151.

Senior halfback Jimmy Richardson completed 58 of 91 passes during the 1941 season for a .637 completion percentage. His 58 completed passes was believed to be a new national record for passing efficiency, passing the previous record of .631 set by Oklahoma's Hugh McCullough in 1938. Richardson was later named to the 1941 Catholics' All-America Team.

Marquette's October 25 game against Duquesne drew a crowd of more than 20,000 persons, at that time the largest crowd in Marquette Stadium history.

Marquette was ranked at No. 60 (out of 681 teams) in the final rankings under the Litkenhous Difference by Score System for 1941.

The team played its home games at Marquette Stadium in Milwaukee.

== Schedule ==
Date	Opponent	Site	Result	Attendance	Source
October 4	at Wisconsin	Camp Randall Stadium; Madison, WI	W 28–7	40,000	
October 11	at Michigan State	Macklin Field; East Lansing, MI	L 7–13	15,000	
October 18	Kansas	Marquette Stadium; Milwaukee, WI	W 33–7	10,000	
October 25	Duquesne	Marquette Stadium; Milwaukee, WI	L 14–31	> 20,000	
November 1	No. 17 Ole Miss^{†}	Marquette Stadium; Milwaukee, WI	L 6–12	7,500	
November 8	at Detroit	University of Detroit Stadium; Detroit, MI	L 6–7	16,541	
November 15	New Mexico	Marquette Stadium; Milwaukee, WI	W 34–0	12,000	
November 22	at Oklahoma	Memorial Stadium; Norman, OK	L 14–61	8,000	
November 29	Iowa State	Marquette Stadium; Milwaukee, WI	W 20–13	8,000	
^{†}Homecoming; Rankings from AP Poll released prior to the game
