= 1941 Rose Poly Engineers football team =

American college football season

1941 Rose Poly Engineers football

IIC co-champion
- Conference: Indiana Intercollegiate Conference
- Record: 7–0 (4–0 IIC)
- Head coach: Phil Brown (14th season)

1941 Indiana Intercollegiate Conference football standings
	Conf.					Overall
Team	W		L		T	W		L		T
Rose Poly +	4	–	0	–	0	7	–	0	–	0
Saint Joseph's (IN) +	3	–	0	–	0	8	–	0	–	1
Ball State	3	–	1	–	1	3	–	2	–	2
Butler	3	–	1	–	0	5	–	4	–	0
Wabash	4	–	2	–	0	5	–	3	–	1
DePauw	3	–	2	–	0	6	–	2	–	0
Indiana State	2	–	1	–	1	5	–	2	–	1
Evansville	2	–	1	–	1	3	–	5	–	1
Manchester	2	–	1	–	1	2	–	2	–	2
Franklin (IN)	2	–	4	–	1	2	–	5	–	1
Hanover	1	–	3	–	0	1	–	7	–	0
Central Normal	1	–	4	–	0	2	–	5	–	0
Earlham	0	–	5	–	0	2	–	5	–	0
Valparaiso	0	–	5	–	0	0	–	8	–	0
+ – Conference co-champions

The 1941 Rose Poly Engineers football team was an American football team that represented Rose Polytechnic Institute as a member of the Indiana Intercollegiate Conference during the 1941 college football season. In its 14th season under head coach Phil Brown, the team compiled a 7–0 record (4–0 against IIC opponents), won the conference championship, and outscored opponents by a total of 229 to 34.

Freshman halfback Eddie McGovern scored 103 points (16 touchdowns, 7 extra points) for the season, including 34 points in the final game of the season against Milton. Halfback Harold Bowsher added 55 points. Four Rose Poly players were selected by The Indianapolis News to its All-Indiana college football teams: McGovern (1st team); Bowsher (2nd team); tackle Martin Cavanaugh (1st team); and back Earl Michaels (1st team).

== Schedule ==
Date	Opponent	Site	Result	Source
September 20	Wabash	Terre Haute, IN	W 12–7	
October 4	Austin Peay*	Terre Haute, IN	W 22–7	
October 11	at Evansville	Evansville, IN	W 20–2	
October 18	at Principia*	Elsah, IL	W 32–12	
October 25	Franklin (IN)	Terre Haute, IN	W 54–6	
November 1	at Earlham	Richmond, IN	W 33–0	
November 8	at Milton*	Milton, WI	W 56–0	
November 15	Holbrook*	Terre Haute, IN	Cancelled	
*Non-conference game
