= 1941 Detroit Tech Dynamics football team =

American college football season

1941 Detroit Tech Dynamics football
- Conference: Independent
- Record: 0–7–1
- Head coach: Julius Goldman (1st season)
- Captain: Francis "Red" Logan
- Home stadium: Robinson Field

1941 Midwestern college football independents records
	Conf.			Overall
Team	W	L	T	W		L		T
Western Michigan		–		8	–	0	–	0
No. 3 Notre Dame		–		8	–	0	–	1
Youngstown		–		7	–	0	–	1
Xavier		–		9	–	1	–	0
Detroit		–		7	–	2	–	0
Ohio		–		5	–	2	–	1
Dayton		–		7	–	3	–	0
Cincinnati		–		6	–	3	–	0
Akron		–		5	–	3	–	1
Michigan State		–		5	–	3	–	1
Central Michigan		–		4	–	3	–	0
Ohio Wesleyan		–		5	–	4	–	0
Michigan Tech		–		3	–	3	–	0
Marquette		–		4	–	5	–	0
Carthage		–		1	–	5	–	2
Wayne		–		2	–	6	–	0
Miami (OH)		–		2	–	7	–	0
Western Ontario		–		1	–	4	–	0
Wichita		–		1	–	6	–	1
Michigan State Normal		–		0	–	5	–	2
Detroit Tech		–		0	–	7	–	1
Rankings from AP Poll

The 1941 Detroit Tech Dynamics football team represented the Detroit Institute of Technology as an independent during the 1941 college football season. In their first and only season under head coach Julius Goldman, the Dynamics compiled a 0–7–1 record.

Prior to 1941, Goldman had been Detroit Tech's backfield coach under head coach Hal Shields. Goldman is best known as a basketball pioneer who advocated the 1936 rule change eliminating the jump ball after every field goal. For the 1941 season, the team arranged "the most ambitious schedule in the school's football history." At the start of the season, an Ohio newspaper described the Detroit Tech team as being "untouted and unscouted". Key players included team captain Francis "Red" Logan, playing at the tackle position, as well as end Joe Slezinger and guards Vic Borden and Dick Bruce.

In February 1942, Detroit Tech announced that its withdrawal from intercollegiate football for at least a year or two. Goldman, who was also the school's athletic director, cited the financial loss suffered by the program as well as manpower and scheduling problems.

== Schedule ==
Date	Opponent	Site	Result	Source
September 26	at Dayton	Dayton Stadium; Dayton, OH	L 0–75	
October 4	at Toledo	Toledo, OH	L 0–55	
October 11	at Western Ontario	London, ON	L 0–19	
October 25	Saint Joseph's (IN)	Robinson Field; Detroit, MI	L 0–25	
November 1	at Morningside	Sioux City, IA	L 7–50	
November 8	Eau Claire State	Robinson Field; Detroit, MI	T 0–0	
November 15	St. Ambrose	Robinson Field; Detroit, MI	L 0–26	
November 22	at Morris Harvey	Charlestown, WV	L 7–40	
