= 1941 Michigan State Spartans football team =

American college football season

1941 Michigan State Spartans football
- Conference: Independent
- Record: 5–3–1
- Head coach: Charlie Bachman (9th season)
- MVP: Anthony Arena
- Captains: Wilford D. Davis; William Rupp
- Home stadium: Macklin Field

1941 Midwestern college football independents records
	Conf.			Overall
Team	W	L	T	W		L		T
Western Michigan		–		8	–	0	–	0
No. 3 Notre Dame		–		8	–	0	–	1
Youngstown		–		7	–	0	–	1
Xavier		–		9	–	1	–	0
Detroit		–		7	–	2	–	0
Ohio		–		5	–	2	–	1
Dayton		–		7	–	3	–	0
Cincinnati		–		6	–	3	–	0
Akron		–		5	–	3	–	1
Michigan State		–		5	–	3	–	1
Central Michigan		–		4	–	3	–	0
Ohio Wesleyan		–		5	–	4	–	0
Michigan Tech		–		3	–	3	–	0
Marquette		–		4	–	5	–	0
Carthage		–		1	–	5	–	2
Wayne		–		2	–	6	–	0
Miami (OH)		–		2	–	7	–	0
Western Ontario		–		1	–	4	–	0
Wichita		–		1	–	6	–	1
Michigan State Normal		–		0	–	5	–	2
Detroit Tech		–		0	–	7	–	1
Rankings from AP Poll

The 1941 Michigan State Spartans football team represented Michigan State College as an independent during the 1941 college football season. In their ninth season under head coach Charlie Bachman, the Spartans compiled a 5–3–1 record and lost their annual rivalry game with Michigan by a 19 to 7 score. In inter-sectional play, the team lost to Santa Clara (7–0) and defeated Temple (46–0) and West Virginia (14–12).

Michigan State was ranked at No. 43 (out of 681 teams) in the final rankings under the Litkenhous Difference by Score System for 1941.

== Schedule ==
Date	Opponent	Site	Result	Attendance	Source
September 27	at Michigan	Michigan Stadium; Ann Arbor, MI (rivalry)	L 7–19	67,079	
October 11	Marquette	Macklin Field; East Lansing, MI	W 13–7	15,000	
October 18	at Santa Clara	Kezar Stadium; San Francisco, CA	L 0–7	18,000	
October 25	Wayne	Macklin Field; East Lansing, MI	W 39–6	15,200	
November 1	Missouri^{†}	Macklin Field; East Lansing, MI	L 0–19	15,750	
November 8	at Purdue	Ross–Ade Stadium; West Lafayette, IN	T 0–0	17,000	
November 15	Temple	Macklin Field; East Lansing, MI	W 46–0	10,123	
November 22	Ohio Wesleyan	Macklin Field; East Lansing, MI	W 31–7	10,000	
November 29	at West Virginia	Mountaineer Field; Morgantown, WV	W 14–12	10,126	
^{†}Homecoming

== Game summaries ==
=== Michigan ===
Michigan State at Michigan

Team	1	2	3	4	Total
Michigan State	7	0	0	0	7
• Michigan	0	7	12	0	19

- Date: September 27, 1941
- Location: Michigan Stadium
  Ann Arbor, MI
- Game attendance: 67,079

On September 27, 1941, Michigan State lost Michigan by a 19 to 7 score. The game was Michigan's first without Tom Harmon, who had led the Wolverines from 1938 to 1940. Sophomore tailback Tom Kuzma, from Harmon's home town of Gary, Indiana, took over Harmon's spot and scored two touchdowns in his first game for the Wolverines. Michigan State took the lead on the third play from scrimmage with a 74-yard sweep around left end by halfback Jack Fenton. Michigan came back with a touchdown in the second quarter and two more in the third quarter. In addition to Kuzma's two touchdowns, fullback Bob Westfall also scored on a one-yard run in the third quarter. Bob Ingalls kicked for one point after touchdown for Michigan. Michigan out-gained Michigan State on the ground with 235 rushing yards to 104 for the Spartans. Wilfrid Smith of the Chicago Tribune wrote that the key to Michigan's victory was its veteran line that "completely outplayed" the Spartans' line.
