= 1941 Illinois State Normal Redbirds football team =

American college football season

1941 Illinois State Normal Redbirds football

IIAC co-champion
- Conference: Illinois Intercollegiate Athletic Conference
- Record: 3–4–2 (3–1 IIAC)
- Head coach: Howard Hancock (11th season)
- MVP: Sam Chicas
- Captain: Harold Gaffney
- Home stadium: McCormick Field

1941 Illinois Intercollegiate Athletic Conference football standings
	Conf.					Overall
Team	W		L		T	W		L		T
Northern Illinois State +	3	–	1	–	0	7	–	1	–	1
Illinois State Normal +	3	–	1	–	0	3	–	4	–	2
Southern Illinois	2	–	1	–	1	5	–	2	–	1
Western Illinois	1	–	2	–	1	3	–	4	–	1
Eastern Illinois	0	–	4	–	0	0	–	7	–	0
Eureka	0	–	0	–	0	3	–	3	–	1
+ – Conference co-champions

The 1941 Illinois State Normal Redbirds football team represented Illinois State Normal University—now known as Illinois State University—as a member of the Illinois Intercollegiate Athletic Conference (IIAC) during the 1941 college football season. Led by 11th-year head coach Howard Hancock, the Redbirds compiled an overall record of 3–4–2 with a mark of 3–1 in conference play, sharing the IIAC title with Northern Illinois State. Illinois State Normal played home games at McCormick Field in Normal, Illinois.

== Schedule ==
Date	Opponent	Site	Result	Source
September 20	Indiana State*	McCormick Field; Normal, IL	L 6–19	
September 27	at Platteville State*	Platteville, WI	T 0–0	
October 4	Michigan State Normal*	McCormick Field; Normal, IL	T 0–0	
October 11	at Northern Illinois State	Glidden Field; DeKalb, IL	L 0–6	
October 18	at Eastern Illinois	Charleston, IL (rivalry)	W 26–7	
October 25	Southern Illinois^{†}	McCormick Field; Normal, IL	W 18–0	
November 1	at Western Illinois	Morgan Field; Macomb, IL	W 14–0	
November 8	at Eastern Kentucky*	Richmond, KY	L 0–54	
November 15	Illinois Wesleyan*	McCormick Field; Normal, IL	L 0–7	
*Non-conference game; ^{†}Homecoming
