= 1941 Southern Illinois Maroons football team =

American college football season

1941 Southern Illinois Maroons football
- Conference: Illinois Intercollegiate Athletic Conference
- Record: 5–2–1 (2–1–1 IIAC)
- Head coach: Glenn Martin (3rd season)
- Home stadium: McAndrew Stadium

1941 Illinois Intercollegiate Athletic Conference football standings
	Conf.					Overall
Team	W		L		T	W		L		T
Northern Illinois State +	3	–	1	–	0	7	–	1	–	1
Illinois State Normal +	3	–	1	–	0	3	–	4	–	2
Southern Illinois	2	–	1	–	1	5	–	2	–	1
Western Illinois	1	–	2	–	1	3	–	4	–	1
Eastern Illinois	0	–	4	–	0	0	–	7	–	0
Eureka	0	–	0	–	0	3	–	3	–	1
+ – Conference co-champions

The 1941 Southern Illinois Maroons football team was an American football team that represented Southern Illinois Normal University (now known as Southern Illinois University Carbondale) in the Illinois Intercollegiate Athletic Conference (IIAC) during the 1941 college football season. Under third-year head coach Glenn Martin, the team compiled a 5–2–1 record. The team played its home games at McAndrew Stadium in Carbondale, Illinois.

== Schedule ==
Date	Opponent	Site	Result	Source
September 21	Evansville*	McAndrew Stadium; Carbondale, IL	W 14–0	
October 11	at Arkansas State*	Kays Stadium; Jonesboro, AR	W 27–0	
October 18	Western Illinois	McAndrew Stadium; Carbondale, IL	T 6–6	
October 25	at Illinois State Normal	McCormick Field; Normal, IL	L 0–18	
November 1	Northern Illinois State	McAndrew Stadium; Carbondale, IL	W 13–7	
November 8	Eastern Illinois	McAndrew Stadium; Carbondale, IL	W 41–0	
November 15	Tennessee Junior*	McAndrew Stadium; Carbondale, IL	W 34–0	
November 20	at Cape Girardeau*	Houck Stadium; Cape Girardeau, MO	L 7–14	
*Non-conference game
