= 1941 DePauw Tigers football team =

American college football season

1941 DePauw Tigers football
- Conference: Indiana Intercollegiate Conference
- Record: 6–2 (3–2 IIC)
- Head coach: Ray Neal (12th season)
- Home stadium: Ira B. Blackstock Memorial Stadium

1941 Indiana Intercollegiate Conference football standings
| | Conf. | | | | | Overall |
| Team | W | | L | | T | W | | L | | T |
|---|---|---|---|---|---|---|---|---|---|---|
| Rose Poly + | 4 | – | 0 | – | 0 | 7 | – | 0 | – | 0 |
| Saint Joseph's (IN) + | 3 | – | 0 | – | 0 | 8 | – | 0 | – | 1 |
| Ball State | 3 | – | 1 | – | 1 | 3 | – | 2 | – | 2 |
| Butler | 3 | – | 1 | – | 0 | 5 | – | 4 | – | 0 |
| Wabash | 4 | – | 2 | – | 0 | 5 | – | 3 | – | 1 |
| DePauw | 3 | – | 2 | – | 0 | 6 | – | 2 | – | 0 |
| Indiana State | 2 | – | 1 | – | 1 | 5 | – | 2 | – | 1 |
| Evansville | 2 | – | 1 | – | 1 | 3 | – | 5 | – | 1 |
| Manchester | 2 | – | 1 | – | 1 | 2 | – | 2 | – | 2 |
| Franklin (IN) | 2 | – | 4 | – | 1 | 2 | – | 5 | – | 1 |
| Hanover | 1 | – | 3 | – | 0 | 1 | – | 7 | – | 0 |
| Central Normal | 1 | – | 4 | – | 0 | 2 | – | 5 | – | 0 |
| Earlham | 0 | – | 5 | – | 0 | 2 | – | 5 | – | 0 |
| Valparaiso | 0 | – | 5 | – | 0 | 0 | – | 8 | – | 0 |
+ – Conference co-champions

The 1941 DePauw Tigers football team was an American football team that represented DePauw University as a member of the Indiana Intercollegiate Conference (IIC) during the 1941 college football season. In its 12th season under head coach Ray "Gaumy" Neal, the team compiled a 6–2 record.

The team played its home games at the newly constructed Ira B. Blackstock Memorial Stadium in Greencastle, Indiana. The stadium was built at a cost of $80,000. The stadium was a gift from the widow of Ira B. Blackstock, a DePauw alumnus and university trustee who died in 1931.

Four DePauw players were selected by The Indianapolis News to its All-Indiana college football teams: guard George Crane (1st team); back Arthur Lavidge (2nd team); tackle James Highland (3rd team); and back Mike Melinki (3rd team).

== Schedule ==
| Date | Opponent | Site | Result | Attendance | Source |
|---|---|---|---|---|---|
| September 27 | Franklin | Blackstock Memorial Stadium; Greencastle, IN | W 26–6 | 2,500–3,000 | |
| October 4 | Carleton* | Blackstock Memorial Stadium; Greencastle, IN | W 7–6 | 2,500 | |
| October 11 | at Hanover | Hanover, IN | W 13–0 | | |
| October 18 | Butler | Blackstock Memorial Stadium; Greencastle, IN | L 6–20 | 3,000 | |
| October 25 | at Oberlin* | Oberlin, OH | W 6–0 | | |
| November 1 | Louisville* | Blackstock Memorial Stadium; Greencastle, IN | W 13–6 | | |
| November 8 | Earlham | Blackstock Memorial Stadium; Greencastle, IN | W 32–0 | | |
| November 15 | at Wabash | Crawfordsville, IN (Monon Bell) | L 19–27 | | |
*Non-conference game

== Roster ==
The roster of the 1941 DePauw team included the following players:

- Willard Becker, center, 5'10", 155 pounds
- Max Biggs, end, 6'1", 170 pounds
- Howard Blomgren, guard, 5'10", 165 pounds
- Dick Brown, tackle, 5'10", 183 pounds
- Warren Brown, back, 5'7", 154 pounds
- J.B. Campbell, guard, 5'8", 170 pounds
- George Christie, back, 5'7", 158 pounds
- George Crane, guard, 6'1", 193 pounds
- John Dewar, back, 5'9", 170 pounds
- Edmund Donk, back, 6', 170 pounds
- Bob Earhart, guard, 5'9", 171 pounds
- William Fischer, tackle, 6'2", 198 pounds
- Don Galbraith, back, 5'10", 180 pounds
- Fred Garlock, end, 5'9", 156 pounds
- Larry Hankes, back, 5'10", 162 pounds
- Carl Hein, tackle, 6', 160 pounds
- Al Hermeling, tackle, 6'1", 170 pounds
- James Highland, tackle, 6', 202 pounds
- Frank Hitchings, back, 5'7", 145 pounds
- Roger Holcomb, end, 6'2", 174 pounds
- Fred Howat, back, 5'10", 145 pounds
- John Jenkins, guard, 5'9", 160 pounds
- Harry Johnson, end, 6'2", 183 pounds
- John Jones, end, 6'1", 180 pounds
- Marvin Kishler, center, 5'11", 152 pounds
- Arthur Lavidge, back, 6', 182 pounds
- John Long, back, 6'1", 185 pounds
- Richard McCally, guard, 5'11" 165 pounds
- Mike Milenki, back, 6'7", 163 pounds
- Ray Moehring, tackle, 6'2", 197 pounds
- Brad Phillips, center, 5'8", 170 pounds
- Charles Rose, back, 6', 170 pounds
- Bud Sherrow, guard, 5'11", 165 pounds
- Edward Stokes, center, 5'11", 170 pounds
- Guy Walker, back, 6'3", 185 pounds
- Carl Woesner, end, 6', 174 pounds
- Art Zwerlein, tackle, 6'3", 183 pounds
