= 1941 Kent State Golden Flashes football team =

American college football season

1941 Kent State Golden Flashes football
- Conference: Ohio Athletic Conference
- Record: 2–5–1 (1–3 OAC)
- Head coach: Donald Starn (7th season)
- Home stadium: Kent State Athletic Field

1941 Ohio Athletic Conference football standings
	Conf.					Overall
Team	W		L		T	W		L		T
Case $	4	–	0	–	0	7	–	1	–	0
Toledo	2	–	0	–	0	7	–	4	–	0
Ohio Northern	5	–	0	–	1	6	–	1	–	1
Bowling Green	4	–	0	–	1	5	–	2	–	0
Denison	5	–	1	–	1	7	–	1	–	1
Wooster	5	–	1	–	1	5	–	1	–	1
Kenyon	4	–	1	–	0	5	–	2	–	0
Heidelberg	5	–	2	–	0	6	–	2	–	0
Otterbein	4	–	2	–	0	5	–	3	–	0
Wittenberg	3	–	4	–	0	4	–	4	–	0
Muskingum	2	–	4	–	0	3	–	5	–	0
John Carroll	1	–	2	–	1	2	–	5	–	1
Kent State	1	–	3	–	0	2	–	5	–	1
Marietta	1	–	3	–	0	1	–	6	–	0
Capital	1	–	4	–	0	2	–	4	–	1
Baldwin–Wallace	0	–	2	–	1	3	–	4	–	1
Ashland	0	–	3	–	0	0	–	5	–	0
Findlay	0	–	4	–	0	3	–	5	–	0
Oberlin	0	–	4	–	0	0	–	7	–	0
Mount Union	0	–	6	–	0	1	–	7	–	0
$ – Conference champion

The 1941 Kent State Golden Flashes football team was an American football team that represented Kent State University in the Ohio Athletic Conference (OAC) during the 1941 college football season. In their seventh season under head coach Donald Starn, the Golden Flashes compiled a 2–5–1 record. It was their first season at the new Athletic Field, which replaced their original home of Rockwell Field.

The team won the first two games by a combined total of 84 to 0. In the season opener, the team scored a 58–0 victory over Bluffton. It was the largest single-game point total in the history of the Kent State football program, surpassing the 54 points scored against Buffalo in 1938. The Golden Flashes scored 52 of their points in the second half, including 33 points in the fourth quarter.

In the final six games of the season, the Golden Flashes did not win another game and were outscored by a total of 100 to 25.

The roster included an African-American back, Grady Jackson, a sophomore transfer student from Mercer. Joe Mileski was the team's quarterback and punter.

Kent State was ranked at No. 212 (out of 681 teams) in the final rankings under the Litkenhous Difference by Score System.

== Schedule ==
Date	Opponent	Site	Result	Attendance	Source
September 27	Bluffton*	Kent State Athletic Field; Kent, OH	W 58–0	2,500	
October 3	Findlay	Donnell Memorial Stadium; Findlay, OH	W 26–0		
October 10	at Case	Shaw Stadium; East Cleveland, OH	L 6–7	4,500	
October 18	West Liberty State Teachers*	Kent State Athletic Field; Kent, OH	T 0–0		
October 25	at Western Reserve*	League Park; Cleveland, OH	L 0–28	3,500	
November 1	Bowling Green	Kent State Athletic Field; Kent, OH (rivalry)	L 6–12	3,000	
November 8	John Carroll	Kent State Athletic Field; Kent, OH	L 0–12		
November 15	at Akron*	Rubber Bowl; Akron, OH (rivalry)	L 13–41	7,000	
*Non-conference game
