= 1941 Wichita Shockers football team =

American college football season

1941 Wichita Shockers football
- Conference: Independent
- Record: 1–6–1
- Head coach: Al Gebert (12th season)

1941 Midwestern college football independents records
	Conf.			Overall
Team	W	L	T	W		L		T
Western Michigan		–		8	–	0	–	0
No. 3 Notre Dame		–		8	–	0	–	1
Youngstown		–		7	–	0	–	1
Xavier		–		9	–	1	–	0
Detroit		–		7	–	2	–	0
Ohio		–		5	–	2	–	1
Dayton		–		7	–	3	–	0
Cincinnati		–		6	–	3	–	0
Akron		–		5	–	3	–	1
Michigan State		–		5	–	3	–	1
Central Michigan		–		4	–	3	–	0
Ohio Wesleyan		–		5	–	4	–	0
Michigan Tech		–		3	–	3	–	0
Marquette		–		4	–	5	–	0
Carthage		–		1	–	5	–	2
Wayne		–		2	–	6	–	0
Miami (OH)		–		2	–	7	–	0
Western Ontario		–		1	–	4	–	0
Wichita		–		1	–	6	–	1
Michigan State Normal		–		0	–	5	–	2
Detroit Tech		–		0	–	7	–	1
Rankings from AP Poll

The 1941 Wichita Shockers football team was an American football team that represented Wichita University (now known as Wichita State University) as an independent during the 1941 college football season. In their 12th and final season under head coach Al Gebert, the Shockers compiled a 1–6–1 record.

Wichita was ranked at No. 149 (out of 681 teams) in the final rankings under the Litkenhous Difference by Score System for 1941.

== Schedule ==
Date	Opponent	Site	Result	Attendance	Source
September 26	at Southwestern (KS)	Winfield, KS	L 13–16		
October 3	St. Benedict's	Wichita, KS	L 0–7		
October 18	Washburn	Wichita, KS	T 7–7	3,600	
October 25	Dayton	Wichita, KS	L 6–14		
November 1	at Tulsa	Skelly Field; Tulsa, OK	L 7–13		
November 8	at Kansas State Teachers	Emporia, KS	W 27–13		
November 22	at Saint Louis	Walsh Stadium; St. Louis, MO	L 6–7	1,129	
November 27	Oklahoma A&M	Wichita, KS	L 13–33		

== After the season ==
=== NFL draft ===
The following Shocker was selected in the 1942 NFL draft following the season.

Round	Pick	Player	Position	NFL club
16	148	Keith Doggett	Tackle	New York Giants
