= Wally Marks =

American football, basketball, baseball player, coach, and administrator

Biographical details
- Born: February 16, 1905; Ottumwa, Iowa, U.S.
- Died: November 24, 1992 (aged 87); Terre Haute, Indiana, U.S.

Playing career
- 1924–1927: Chicago
- Positions: Fullback, halfback (football); Guard (basketball); Pitcher, outfielder (baseball)

Coaching career (HC unless noted)

Football
- 1927–1930: Indiana State
- 1930–1932: Indiana (assistant)
- 1933–1941: Indiana State
- 1945: Personnel Distribution Command
- 1946–1948: Indiana State

Basketball
- 1927–1931: Indiana State
- 1933–1938: Indiana State

Baseball
- 1929–1931: Indiana State
- 1934–1937: Indiana State
- 1942: Indiana State
- 1946–1947: Indiana State
- 1949–1955: Indiana State

Administrative career (AD unless noted)
- 1948: Indiana State (interim AD)

Head coaching record
- Overall: 68–58–8 (football); 90–58 (basketball); 108–81–1 (baseball)

Accomplishments and honors

Championships
- Baseball; 4 IIC (1930, 1946–1947, 1949)

Walter E. Marks (February 16, 1905 – November 24, 1992) was an American football, basketball, and baseball player, coach, college athletics administrator, sports official, and university instructor. Marks played football, basketball, and baseball at the University of Chicago. Between 1927 and 1955 he served as the head football, basketball, baseball, and golf coach at Indiana State University, with hiatuses from 1930 to 1931, when he earned a master's degree at Indiana University, and from 1942 to 1945, when he served in the United States Army Air Forces during World War II. Marks was best known for his football and baseball coaching career(s); though his tenure as basketball coach was highlighted by the Sycamores' run to the semifinals of the 1936 U.S. Olympic Trials.

Marks also served as the Indiana State's athletic director. In total, Marks spent 44 years at Indiana State rising from instructor to the Dean of the School of Health, Physical Education and Recreation, now known as the College of Nursing, Health, and Human Services. He held two degrees from the University of Chicago, a BA and a PhD, and three from Indiana University, an MA, a doctorate in physical education, and a doctorate of education. At his retirement in 1971, Indiana State's home track and field venue was dedicated in his honor. Marks reached the rank of major in the United States Army Air Forces and spent 44 months in the Mediterranean Theater of Operations.

== Playing career ==
At the University of Chicago, Marks was an outstanding athlete. A three-sport performer, he earned a total of eight varsity letters in football, basketball, and baseball, was an ROTC Cadet Major, and held membership in several honorary fraternities. He played varsity football for three years under the Maroons' coach, Amos Alonzo Stagg. As a sophomore, he played fullback for Chicago's last Big Ten Conference football championship team in 1924. He was a regular halfback on the 1925 and 1926 Maroon teams and captained the 1926 team. For two years, he was a regular starting guard on the Maroons' basketball team. As a pitcher and an outfielder, he played on Chicago's baseball team for three years and had a .399 batting average as a sophomore. Marks also played professional baseball. While pitching for Terre Haute of the Three-I League, he defeated Carl Hubbell of Decatur in a 17-inning masterpiece.

== Coaching career ==
=== Football ===
Marked finished his career as the leader in wins (he currently stands at #2). His 1933 team finished at 7–1 record. This record still ranks as the second best in the school's history; trailing Coach Jerry Huntsman's 1968 team (9–1). His homecoming record was 8–5.

=== Basketball ===
He finished his career as the leader in wins (he currently stands at #7). Led the Sycamores to a semifinal finish in the 1936 U.S. Olympic Trials. His 1929–30 team finished at 16–2; it still ranks among the finest season performances of any ISU team with its .888 winning percentage.

=== Baseball ===
He finished his career as the leader in wins (he currently stands at #4). He led the Sycamores to Indiana Intercollegiate Conference titles in 1930, 1946, 1947 and 1949.

=== Golf ===
He coached the Indiana State Men's golf team for nine seasons (1957–1965); his final club, the 1965 team won the Indiana Collegiate Conference title.

== Officiating and military athletics instruction ==
Marks was a Big Ten Conference official for 20 years with tenures of eight years in basketball and 16 years in football. He officiated the 1960 Rose Bowl and retired at the close of the 1964 football season. In 1954, and again in 1960, he was named by the Big Ten and the United States Department of Defense as a member of an instructional staff presenting football officiating clinics for United States military personnel in Germany.

== Honors ==
- Indiana Football Hall of Fame (1974)
- Indiana State University Hall of Fame (1982)

== Head coaching record ==
=== Football ===
Year	Team	Overall	Conference	Standing	Bowl/playoffs
Indiana State Sycamores (Independent) (1927–1930)
1927	Indiana State	4–2–1			
1928	Indiana State	4–3			
1929	Indiana State	5–2–1			
1930	Indiana State	5–3–1			
Indiana State Sycamores (Independent) (1933)
1933	Indiana State	7–1			
Indiana State Sycamores (Indiana Intercollegiate Conference) (1934–1941)
1934	Indiana State	3–5	3–3		
1935	Indiana State	5–3	4–1	4th	
1936	Indiana State	2–3–2	2–0–1	2nd	
1937	Indiana State	1–7	1–4	T–12th	
1938	Indiana State	1–7	1–4	11th	
1939	Indiana State	2–6	0–3	14th	
1940	Indiana State	5–1–2	2–1	T–6th	
1941	Indiana State	5–2–1	2–1–1	T–7th	
Personnel Distribution Command Comets (Army Air Forces League) (1945)
1945	Personnel Distribution Command	6–2 (Note: Ted Shipkey served as head coach of the Personnel Distribution Command Comets for the first three games of the 1945 season, until his discharge from the military. He was succeeded by Marks, who led the team for the remainder of the year. The Comets finished the season with an overall record of 6–5 and a mark of 2–4 league play.)	2–2	6th	
Personnel Distribution Command:		6–2	2–2		
Indiana State Sycamores (Indiana Intercollegiate Conference) (1946–1947)
1946	Indiana State	4–4	2–4	T–10th	
1947	Indiana State	5–3	2–1		
Indiana State Sycamores (Independent) (1946–1948)
1948	Indiana State	4–4			
Indiana State:		62–56–8	19–22–1		
Total:		68–58–8			

=== Basketball ===
Record table
Season	Team	Overall	Conference	Standing	Postseason
Indiana State Sycamores (Indiana Intercollegiate Conference) (1927–1938)
1927–28	Indiana State	12–5			
1928–29	Indiana State	15–4			
1929–30	Indiana State	16–2	8–2	1st	
1930–31	Indiana State	7–8			
1933–34	Indiana State	8–9			
1934–35	Indiana State	13–4			
1935–36	Indiana State	12–4			U.S. Olympic Trials
1936–37	Indiana State	7–6			
1937–38	Indiana State	1–17	1–9		
Indiana State:		90–58 (.608)			
Total:		90–58 (.608)			
National champion Postseason invitational champion Conference regular season champion Conference regular season and conference tournament champion Division regular season champion Division regular season and conference tournament champion Conference tournament champion

=== Baseball ===
		Overall				Conference				
Year	School	W	L	T	Pct	W	L	T	Pct	Postseason
1929	Indiana State	5	4	1	.550					
1930	Indiana State	7	1	0	.875					Indiana Intercollegiate Conference Champions
1931	Indiana State	6	2	0	.750					
1934	Indiana State	5	3	0	.625					
1935	Indiana State	5	5	0	.500					
1936	Indiana State	7	5	0	.583					
1937	Indiana State	1	7	0	.125					
1942	Indiana State	5	3	0	.625					
1946	Indiana State	7	3	0	.700					Indiana Intercollegiate Conference Champions
1947	Indiana State	11	2	0	.846					Indiana Intercollegiate Conference Champions
1949	Indiana State	12	4	0	.750					Indiana Intercollegiate Conference Champions
1950	Indiana State	10	5	0	.667					
1951	Indiana State	8	8	0	.500					
1952	Indiana State	8	5	0	.615					
1953	Indiana State	3	9	0	.250					
1954	Indiana State	6	10	0	.600					
1955	Indiana State	5	6	0	.455					
Overall Totals		108	81	2	.571					

== See also ==
- List of college football head coaches with non-consecutive tenure
