= List of Ball State Cardinals football seasons =

The following is a list of Ball State Cardinals football seasons for the football team that has represented Ball State University in NCAA competition.

== Seasons ==
Year	Coach	Overall	Conference	Standing	Bowl/playoffs	Coaches^{#}	AP^{°}
Independent (1924–c. 1949)
1924	Paul "Billy" Williams	1–3					
1925	Paul "Billy" Williams	2–5					
1926	Norman G. Wann	5–1–1					
1927	Norman G. Wann	5–2–1					
1928	Paul B. Parker	3–2–2					
1929	Paul B. Parker	0–5					
Indiana Collegiate Conference (1930–c. 1946)
1930	Lawrence McPhee	6–1	6–1	4th			
1931	Lawrence McPhee	2–6	2–5	13th			
1932	Lawrence McPhee	4–4	4–4	9th			
1933	Lawrence McPhee	1–6–1	1–6–1	14th			
1934	Lawrence McPhee	2–6	2–6	11th			
1935	John Magnabosco	3–4–1	3–4–1	8th			
1936	John Magnabosco	3–4–1	3–3–1	8th			
1937	John Magnabosco	5–2–1	5–1–1	4th			
1938	John Magnabosco	6–1–1	6–1–1	3rd			
1939	John Magnabosco	6–2	5–1	2nd			
1940	John Magnabosco	3–4–1	2–3	T–9th			
1941	John Magnabosco	3–2–2	3–1–1	3rd			
1942	John Magnabosco	6–2	5–0	1st			
1943	No games	––					
1944	John Magnabosco	2–2					
1945	John Magnabosco	4–1–1	4–1–1	3rd			
1946	John Magnabosco	3–4–1	3–3	T–7th			
Independent (1947–1950)
1947	John Magnabosco	5–1–2					
1948	John Magnabosco	6–2					
1949	John Magnabosco	8–0					
1950	John Magnabosco	2–4–1					
Indiana Collegiate Conference (1951–c. 1967)
1951	John Magnabosco	0–6–1	0–4–1	6th			
1952	John Magnabosco	3–5–1	3–2	4th			
1953	George Serdula	5–2–1	3–2	T–2nd			
1954	George Serdula	6–2	4–2	T–2nd			
1955	George Serdula	3–5	1–5	T–6th			
1956	Jim Freeman	4–4	2–4	5th			
1957	Jim Freeman	2–5–1	2–3–1	4th			
1958	Jim Freeman	6–2	4–2	T–2nd			
1959	Jim Freeman	1–7	1–5	7th			
1960	Jim Freeman	3–5	2–4	T–5th			
1961	Jim Freeman	2–5–1	2–4	T–4th			
1962	Ray Louthen	4–3–1	2–3–1	6th			
1963	Ray Louthen	5–3	4–2	2nd			
1964	Ray Louthen	5–3	4–2	T–1st			
1965	Ray Louthen	9–0–1	6–0	1st	T Grantland Rice		
1966	Ray Louthen	7–1–1	5–0–1	1st			
1967	Ray Louthen	7–3	5–1	1st	L Grantland Rice		
Independent (1968–c. 1969)
1968	Wave Myers	5–4					
1969	Wave Myers	5–5					
Conference of Midwestern Universities (1970–c. 1971)
1970	Wave Myers	5–5					
1971	Dave McClain	4–5–1					
Independent (c. 1972–c. 1974)
1972	Dave McClain	5–4–1					
1973	Dave McClain	5–5–1					
1974	Dave McClain	6–4					
Mid-American Conference (c. 1975–present)
1975	Dave McClain	9–2	4–2	T–3rd			
1976	Dave McClain	8–3	4–1	1st			
1977	Dave McClain	9–2	5–1	3rd			
1978	Dwight Wallace	10–1	8–0	1st			
1979	Dwight Wallace	6–5	4–4	T–4th			
1980	Dwight Wallace	6–5	5–4	T–5th			
1981	Dwight Wallace	4–7	2–6	8th			
1982	Dwight Wallace	5–6	4–4	8th			
1983	Dwight Wallace	6–5	4–4	5th			
1984	Dwight Wallace	3–8	3–5	T–6th			
1985	Paul Schudel	4–7	3–6	T–6th			
1986	Paul Schudel	6–5	4–4	T–5th			
1987	Paul Schudel	4–7	3–5	8th			
1988	Paul Schudel	8–3	5–3	T–3rd			
1989	Paul Schudel	7–3–2	6–1	1st	L California		
1990	Paul Schudel	7–4	5–3	T–3rd			
1991	Paul Schudel	6–5	4–4	T–5th			
1992	Paul Schudel	5–6	5–4	6th			
1993	Paul Schudel	8–3–1	7–0–1	1st	L Las Vegas		
1994	Paul Schudel	5–5–1	5–3–1	5th			
1995	Bill Lynch	7–4	6–2	T–3rd			
1996	Bill Lynch	8–4	7–1	1st	L Las Vegas		
1997	Bill Lynch	5–6	4–4	3rd (West)			
1998	Bill Lynch	1–10	1–7	6th (West)			
1999	Bill Lynch	0–11	0–8	6th (West)			
2000	Bill Lynch	5–6	4–3	T–3rd (West)			
2001	Bill Lynch	5–6	4–3	T–1st (West)			
2002	Bill Lynch	6–6	4–4	4th (West)			
2003	Brady Hoke	4–8	3–5	5th (West)			
2004	Brady Hoke	2–9	2–6	6th (West)			
2005	Brady Hoke	4–7	4–4	5th (West)			
2006	Brady Hoke	5–7	5–3	T–3rd (West)			
2007	Brady Hoke	7–6	5–2	T–1st (West)	L International		
2008	Stan Parrish	12–2	8–0	1st (West)	L GMAC		
2009	Stan Parrish	2–10	2–6	5th (West)			
2010	Stan Parrish	4–8	3–5	4th (West)			
2011	Pete Lembo	6–6	4–4	T–4th (West)			
2012	Pete Lembo	9–4	6–2	T–2nd (West)	L Beef 'O' Brady's		
2013	Pete Lembo	10–3	7–1	2nd (West)	L GoDaddy		
2014	Pete Lembo	5–7	4–4	5th (West)			
2015	Pete Lembo	3–9	2–6	5th (West)			
2016	Mike Neu	4–8	1–7	6th (West)			
2017	Mike Neu	2–10	0–8	6th (West)			
2018	Mike Neu	4–8	3–5	5th (West)			
2019	Mike Neu	5–7	4–4	T–3rd (West)			
2020	Mike Neu	7–1	5–1	1st	W Arizona	23	23
2021	Mike Neu	6–7	4–4	4th	L Camellia		
2022	Mike Neu	5–7	3–5	4th			
2023	Mike Neu	4–8	3–5	4th			
2024	Mike Neu / Colin Johnson	3–9	2–6	T–9th			
2025	Mike Uremovich	4–8	3–5	T–9th			
Total:		483–473–32 (.505)					
National championship Conference title Conference division title or championship game berth
^{†}Indicates Bowl Coalition, Bowl Alliance, BCS, or CFP / New Years' Six bowl.; ^{#}Rankings from final Coaches Poll.
