= 1935 Ball State Cardinals football team =

American college football season

1935 Ball State Cardinals football
- Conference: Indiana Intercollegiate Conference
- Record: 3–4–1 (3–4–1 IIC)
- Head coach: John Magnabosco (1st season)
- Home stadium: Ball State Athletic Field

1935 Indiana Intercollegiate Conference football standings
	Conf.					Overall
Team	W		L		T	W		L		T
Butler $	6	–	0	–	0	7	–	1	–	0
DePauw	5	–	0	–	2	5	–	1	–	2
Wabash	6	–	1	–	1	6	–	1	–	1
Indiana State	4	–	1	–	0	5	–	3	–	0
Manchester	3	–	1	–	2	4	–	1	–	2
Central Normal	2	–	1	–	2	3	–	1	–	3
Valparaiso	2	–	2	–	0	4	–	4	–	1
Ball State	3	–	4	–	1	3	–	4	–	1
Evansville	4	–	5	–	0	4	–	5	–	0
Hanover	2	–	3	–	0	2	–	5	–	1
Earlham	1	–	2	–	1	0	–	0	–	0
Saint Joseph's (IN)	1	–	3	–	0	1	–	4	–	0
Rose Poly	1	–	5	–	0	2	–	5	–	0
Franklin (IN)	1	–	7	–	0	1	–	7	–	0
Oakland City	0	–	6	–	1	0	–	7	–	1
$ – Conference champion

The 1935 Ball State Cardinals football team was an American football team that represented Ball State Teachers College (later renamed Ball State University) as a member of the Indiana Intercollegiate Conference (IIC) during the 1935 college football season. The Cardinals compiled a 3–4–1 record (3–4–1 against IIC opponents), and finished in eighth place out of 15 teams in the conference, and outscored opponents by a total of 77 to 66.

John Magnabosco was hired as Ball State's head football coach in May 1935, following the resignation of Lawrence McPhee. Magnabosco remained as Ball State's head football coach for the next 18 years. He had been the head football coach at Clinton High School for four years prior to his hiring.

The team played its home games at Ball State Athletic Field in Muncie, Indiana.

== Schedule ==
Date	Opponent	Site	Result	Attendance	Source
September 28	Franklin (IN)	Ball State Athletic Field; Muncie, IN	W 7–0	3,000	
October 4	Central Normal	Ball State Athletic Field; Muncie, IN	W 13–0		
October 12	Valparaiso^{†}	Ball State Athletic Field; Muncie, IN	L 6–20	5,000	
October 19	at DePauw	Greencastle, IN (Old Gold Day)	L 7–14		
October 26	Oakland City	Ball State Athletic Field; Muncie, IN	W 25–0		
November 2	at Indiana State	Terre Haute, IN (rivalry)	L 6–12		
November 9	Manchester	Ball State Athletic Field; Muncie, IN	T 0–0		
November 16	at Hanover	Hanover, IN	L 13–20		
^{†}Homecoming
