= List of Ball State Cardinals head football coaches =

The Ball State Cardinals football program is a college football team that represents Ball State University in the Mid-American Conference a part of the NCAA Division I Football Bowl Subdivision. In nearly a century of play in college football over four affiliations (Indiana Collegiate Conference, Independent, Conference of Midwestern Universities, and the MAC), the Cardinals have had sixteen head coaches.

== Key ==
Key to symbols in coaches list
General		Overall		Conference		Postseason (Note: Although the first Rose Bowl Game was played in 1902, it has been continuously played since the 1916 game, and is recognized as the oldest bowl game by the NCAA. "—" indicates any season prior to 1916 when postseason games were not played.)	
No.	Order of coaches (Note: A running total of the number of head coaches, with coaches who served separate tenures being counted only once. Interim head coaches are represented with "Int" and are not counted in the running total. "—" indicates the team played but either without a coach or no coach is on record. "X" indicates an interim year without play.)	GC	Games coached	CW	Conference wins	PW	Postseason wins
DC	Division championships	OW	Overall wins	CL	Conference losses	PL	Postseason losses
CC	Conference championships	OL	Overall losses	CT	Conference ties	PT	Postseason ties
NC	National championships	OT	Overall ties (Note: Overtime rules in college football were introduced in 1996, making ties impossible in the period since.)	C%	Conference winning percentage		
†	Elected to the College Football Hall of Fame	O%	Overall winning percentage (Note: When computing the win–loss percentage, a tie counts as half a win and half a loss.)				

== Coaches ==
Statistics correct as of the end of the 2025 college football season.

No.	Name	Term	Season(s)	GC	OW	OL	OT	O%	CW	CL	CT	C%	PW	PL	CCs	NCs	Awards
1	Paul "Billy" Williams	1924–1925	2	16	3	13	0	.188									
2	Norman G. Wann	1926–1927	2	15	10	3	2	.733	—	—	—		—	—	—	—	
3	Paul B. Parker	1928–1929	2	7	3	2	2	.571	—	—	—		—	—	—	—	
4	Lawrence McPhee	1930–1934	5	39	15	23	1	.397	—	—	—		—	—	—	—	
5	John Magnabosco	1935–1942; 1944–1952	16	128	68	46	14	.586	35	20	6	.634	—	—	1	—	
N/A	No Team	1943	1	0	0	0	0	—	—	—	—		—	—	—	—	
6	George Serdula	1953–1955	3	24	14	9	1	.604	8	9	0	.470	—	—	—	—	—
7	Jim Freeman	1956–1961	6	48	18	28	2	.396	13	22	1	.375	—	—	—	—	—
8	Ray Louthen	1962–1967	6	53	37	13	3	.726	26	8	2	.750	—	—	4	—	—
9	Wave Myers	1968–1970	3	29	15	14	0	.517	—	—	—	—	—	—	—	—	—
10	Dave McClain	1971–1977	7	74	46	25	3	.642	13	4	0	.764	—	—	1	—	—
11	Dwight Wallace	1978–1984	7	77	40	37	0	.519	30	27	0	.526	—	—	1	—	—
12	Paul Schudel	1985–1994	10	112	60	48	4	.554	48	33	3	.589	0	2	2	—	—
13	Bill Lynch	1995–2002	8	90	37	53	0	.411	30	34	0	.468	0	1	1	—	—
14	Brady Hoke	2003–2008	6	69	30	39	0	.435	27	20	0	.574	0	1	—	—	—
15	Stan Parrish	2008–2010	3	24	6	18	0	.250	5	11	0	.312	0	1	—	—	—
16	Pete Lembo	2011–2015	5	62	33	29	0	.532	23	17	0	.575	0	2	—	—	—
17	Mike Neu	2016–2024	9	103	40	63	0	.388	25	43	0	.368	1	1	1	—	—
Int	Colin Johnson (Note: Johnson served as the interim head coach for the final two games of the 2024 season after Mike Neu was fired from the head coach position)	2024	1	2	0	2	0	.000	0	2	0	.000	0	0	0	—	—
18	Mike Uremovich	2025–present	1	12	4	8	0	.333	3	5	0	.375	0	0	0	—	—
