= 1932 Ball State Cardinals football team =

American college football season

1932 Ball State Cardinals football
- Conference: Indiana Intercollegiate Conference
- Record: 4–4 (4–4 IIC)
- Head coach: Lawrence McPhee (3rd season)
- Home stadium: Ball State Field

1932 Indiana Intercollegiate Conference football standings
| | Conf. | | | | | Overall |
| Team | W | | L | | T | W | | L | | T |
|---|---|---|---|---|---|---|---|---|---|---|
| Manchester + | 4 | – | 0 | – | 0 | 6 | – | 1 | – | 0 |
| Valparaiso + | 3 | – | 0 | – | 0 | 7 | – | 0 | – | 0 |
| Wabash | 4 | – | 0 | – | 2 | 4 | – | 2 | – | 2 |
| DePauw | 3 | – | 1 | – | 1 | 3 | – | 4 | – | 1 |
| Butler | 2 | – | 1 | – | 0 | 2 | – | 4 | – | 1 |
| Franklin (IN) | 4 | – | 2 | – | 1 | 4 | – | 3 | – | 1 |
| Hanover | 3 | – | 2 | – | 1 | 4 | – | 3 | – | 1 |
| Rose Poly | 3 | – | 3 | – | 0 | 5 | – | 3 | – | 0 |
| Ball State | 4 | – | 4 | – | 0 | 4 | – | 4 | – | 0 |
| Evansville | 2 | – | 2 | – | 1 | 2 | – | 4 | – | 1 |
| Indiana State | 3 | – | 4 | – | 0 | 3 | – | 5 | – | 0 |
| Central Normal | 1 | – | 6 | – | 0 | 1 | – | 7 | – | 0 |
| Earlham | 0 | – | 5 | – | 0 | 1 | – | 5 | – | 0 |
| Oakland City | 0 | – | 6 | – | 0 | 1 | – | 6 | – | 0 |
+ – Conference co-champions

The 1932 Ball State Cardinals football team was an American football team that represented Ball State Teachers College (later renamed Ball State University) in the Indiana Intercollegiate Conference (IIC) during the 1932 college football season. In their third season under head coach Lawrence McPhee, the Cardinals compiled a 4–4 record (overall and in conference), finished in ninth place out of 14 teams in the IIC, and outscored opponents by a total of 102 to 90. The team played its home games at Ball State Field in Muncie, Indiana.

== Schedule ==
| Date | Opponent | Site | Result | Attendance | Source |
|---|---|---|---|---|---|
| September 23 | at Butler | Butler Bowl; Indianapolis, IN | L 12–13 | | |
| October 1 | at Earlham | Reid Field; Richmond, IN | W 26–12 | | |
| October 7 | Central Normal | Ball State Field; Muncie, IN | W 18–0 | | |
| October 14 | Oakland City | Ball State Field; Muncie, IN | W 34–12 | | |
| October 22 | at Franklin (IN) | Franklin, IN | L 0–13 | | |
| October 29 | at Manchester | North Manchester, IN | L 0–20 | | |
| November 5 | Valparaiso | Ball State Field; Muncie, IN | L 0–20 | | |
| November 12 | Indiana State^{†} | Ball State Field; Muncie, IN (rivalry) | W 12–0 | | |
^{†}Homecoming
