= 1938 Ball State Cardinals football team =

American college football season

1938 Ball State Cardinals football
- Conference: Indiana Intercollegiate Conference
- Record: 6–1–1 (6–1–1 IIC)
- Head coach: John Magnabosco (4th season)
- Home stadium: Ball State Field

1938 Indiana Intercollegiate Conference football standings
	Conf.					Overall
Team	W		L		T	W		L		T
Butler $	3	–	0	–	0	4	–	4	–	0
Manchester	6	–	1	–	0	7	–	1	–	0
Ball State	6	–	1	–	1	6	–	1	–	1
Hanover	4	–	2	–	0	5	–	2	–	0
DePauw	4	–	2	–	0	5	–	3	–	0
Rose Poly	2	–	1	–	0	5	–	3	–	0
Evansville	4	–	3	–	1	4	–	4	–	1
Valparaiso	2	–	2	–	1	2	–	4	–	1
Saint Joseph's (IN)	1	–	2	–	1	2	–	4	–	1
Franklin (IN)	2	–	5	–	0	2	–	6	–	0
Indiana State	1	–	4	–	0	1	–	7	–	0
Earlham	1	–	5	–	1	1	–	6	–	1
Wabash	1	–	5	–	1	1	–	6	–	1
Central Normal	0	–	4	–	0	0	–	7	–	0
$ – Conference champion

The 1938 Ball State Cardinals football team was an American football team that represented Ball State Teachers College (later renamed Ball State University) in the Indiana Intercollegiate Conference (IIC) during the 1938 college football season. In their fourth season under head coach John Magnabosco, the Cardinals compiled a 6–1–1 record, shut out four of eight opponents, finished in third place out of 14 teams in the IIC, and outscored all opponents by a total of 131 to 48. The team played its home games at Ball State Field in Muncie, Indiana.

== Schedule ==
Date	Opponent	Site	Result	Attendance	Source
September 24	at Butler	Butler Bowl; Indianapolis, IN	L 6–12		
October 1	at Central Normal	Danville, IN	W 26–0		
October 8	Indiana State^{†}	Ball State Field; Muncie, IN (rivalry)	W 13–9		
October 15	at Manchester	North Manchester, IN	W 20–14		
October 22	Saint Joseph's (IN)	Ball State Field; Muncie, IN	T 13–13		
November 5	Hanover	Ball State Field; Muncie, IN	W 19–0		
November 12	Earlham	Ball State Field; Muncie, IN	W 21–0		
November 19	at Valparaiso	Valparaiso, IN	W 13–0		
^{†}Homecoming
