= 1937 Ball State Cardinals football team =

American college football season

1937 Ball State Cardinals football
- Conference: Indiana Intercollegiate Conference
- Record: 5–2–1 (5–1–1 IIC)
- Head coach: John Magnabosco (3rd season)
- Home stadium: Ball State Athletic Field

1937 Indiana Intercollegiate Conference football standings
	Conf.					Overall
Team	W		L		T	W		L		T
Butler $	3	–	0	–	1	5	–	2	–	1
DePauw	7	–	1	–	0	7	–	1	–	0
Saint Joseph's (IN)	4	–	1	–	0	4	–	2	–	1
Ball State	5	–	1	–	1	5	–	2	–	1
Earlham	2	–	1	–	2	4	–	1	–	2
Hanover	4	–	2	–	0	5	–	3	–	0
Valparaiso	4	–	2	–	0	4	–	4	–	0
Wabash	3	–	2	–	2	3	–	3	–	2
Franklin (IN)	3	–	3	–	1	3	–	4	–	1
Rose Poly	2	–	4	–	0	4	–	4	–	0
Manchester	1	–	3	–	0	4	–	3	–	0
Indiana State	1	–	4	–	0	1	–	7	–	0
Central Normal	1	–	4	–	1	1	–	5	–	1
Oakland City	0	–	5	–	0	0	–	7	–	0
Evansville	0	–	7	–	0	0	–	9	–	0
$ – Conference champion

The 1937 Ball State Cardinals football team was an American football team that represented Ball State Teachers College (later renamed Ball State University) in the Indiana Intercollegiate Conference (IIC) during the 1937 college football season. In their third season under head coach John Magnabosco, the Cardinals compiled a 5–2–1 record (5–1–1 against IIC opponents), finished in fourth place out of 15 teams in the IIC, shut out four of eight opponents, and outscored all opponents by a total of 135 to 38. The team played its home games at Ball State Athletic Field in Muncie, Indiana.

== Schedule ==
Date	Opponent	Site	Result	Attendance	Source
September 25	Michigan State Normal*	Ball State Athletic Field; Muncie, IN	L 6–13		
October 2	Oakland City	Ball State Athletic Field; Muncie, IN	W 53–0		
October 9	Central Normal^{†}	Ball State Athletic Field; Muncie, IN	W 26–0		
October 16	at DePauw	Greencastle, IN (Old Gold Day)	L 0–13		
October 23	at Hanover	Hanover, IN	W 12–0		
October 30	Manchester	Ball State Athletic Field; Muncie, IN	W 26–6		
November 6	at Indiana State	Terre Haute, IN (rivalry)	W 7–0		
November 13	Franklin (IN)	Ball State Athletic Field; Muncie, IN	T 6–6		
*Non-conference game; ^{†}Homecoming
