= 1931 Ball State Cardinals football team =

American college football season

1931 Ball State Cardinals football
- Conference: Indiana Intercollegiate Conference
- Record: 2–6 (2–5 IIC)
- Head coach: Lawrence McPhee (2nd season)
- Home stadium: Ball State Athletic Field

1931 Indiana Intercollegiate Conference football standings
	Conf.					Overall
Team	W		L		T	W		L		T
Valparaiso +	4	–	0	–	0	8	–	1	–	0
DePauw +	4	–	0	–	0	7	–	1	–	0
Franklin (IN)	7	–	1	–	0	7	–	1	–	0
Rose Poly	5	–	2	–	0	6	–	2	–	0
Manchester	2	–	1	–	0	4	–	4	–	0
Butler	2	–	1	–	0	3	–	5	–	0
Indiana State	3	–	2	–	0	4	–	3	–	0
Evansville	3	–	3	–	0	3	–	5	–	0
Wabash	3	–	3	–	0	3	–	5	–	1
Oakland City	2	–	3	–	0	3	–	3	–	0
Central Normal	2	–	4	–	0	2	–	4	–	0
Earlham	2	–	4	–	0	2	–	5	–	0
Ball State	2	–	5	–	0	2	–	6	–	0
Hanover	0	–	6	–	1	1	–	7	–	1
Indiana Central	0	–	6	–	1	0	–	6	–	1
+ – Conference co-champions

The 1931 Ball State Cardinals football team was an American football team that represented Ball State Teachers College (later renamed Ball State University) in the Indiana Intercollegiate Conference (IIC) during the 1931 college football season. In their second season under head coach Lawrence McPhee, the Cardinals compiled a 2–6 record (2–5 against IIC opponents), finished in 13th place out of 15 teams in the IIC, and were outscored by a total of 161 to 65. The team played its home games at Ball State Athletic Field in Muncie, Indiana.

== Schedule ==
Date	Opponent	Site	Result	Attendance	Source
September 25	Central Normal	Ball State Athletic Field; Muncie, IN	W 12–0		
October 3	at Miami (OH)*	Miami Field; Oxford, OH	L 6–47		
October 9	at Butler	Indianapolis, IN	L 0–34		
October 17	at Wabash	Crawfordsville, IN	L 0–21		
October 23	Manchester	Ball State Athletic Field; Muncie, IN	L 6–14		
October 31	Earlham	Ball State Athletic Field; Muncie, IN	W 22–6		
November 6	at Indiana State	Terre Haute, IN (rivalry)	L 7–13		
November 14	Franklin (IN)	Ball State Athletic Field; Muncie, IN	L 12–26		
*Non-conference game
