= 1940 Ball State Cardinals football team =

American college football season

1940 Ball State Cardinals football
- Conference: Indiana Intercollegiate Conference
- Record: 3–4–1 (2–3 IIC)
- Head coach: John Magnabosco (8th season)
- Home stadium: Ball State Field

1940 Indiana Intercollegiate Conference football standings
	Conf.					Overall
Team	W		L		T	W		L		T
Manchester +	4	–	0	–	0	5	–	2	–	1
Butler +	4	–	0	–	0	4	–	4	–	1
Evansville	4	–	1	–	0	5	–	3	–	0
Rose Poly	4	–	1	–	0	5	–	3	–	0
Saint Joseph's (IN)	3	–	1	–	0	4	–	2	–	1
Indiana State	2	–	1	–	0	5	–	2	–	1
Wabash	4	–	2	–	0	4	–	4	–	1
DePauw	3	–	3	–	0	3	–	4	–	0
Ball State	2	–	3	–	0	3	–	4	–	1
Valparaiso	2	–	3	–	0	3	–	4	–	1
Hanover	1	–	4	–	0	1	–	8	–	0
Earlham	1	–	4	–	1	1	–	5	–	1
Central Normal	0	–	4	–	1	0	–	5	–	1
Franklin (IN)	0	–	7	–	0	0	–	8	–	0
+ – Conference co-champions

The 1940 Ball State Cardinals football team was an American football team that represented Ball State Teachers College (later renamed Ball State University) as a member of the Indiana Intercollegiate Conference (IIC) during the 1940 college football season. In their eighth season under head coach John Magnabosco, the Cardinals compiled a 3–4–1 record (2–3 against IIC opponents), tied for ninth place out 14 teams in the conference, and outscored opponents by a total of 78 to 69.

Ball State was ranked at No. 289 (out of 697 college football teams) in the final rankings under the Litkenhous Difference by Score system for 1940.

The team played its home games at Ball State Field in Muncie, Indiana.

== Schedule ==
Date	Opponent	Site	Result	Attendance	Source
September 21	at Miami (OH)*	Miami Field; Oxford, OH	T 0–0	5,000	
September 28	DeSales (OH)*	Ball State Field; Muncie, IN	W 12–0		
October 5	Central Michigan*^{†}	Ball State Field; Muncie, IN	L 0–7		
October 19	at Manchester	North Manchester, IN	L 6–7		
October 26	at Valparaiso	Valparaiso, IN	W 26–0		
November 2	Central Normal	Ball State Field; Muncie, IN	W 27–2		
November 9	at Butler	Butler Bowl; Indianapolis, IN	L 0–26	6,000	
November 16	Indiana State	Ball State Field; Muncie, IN (Blue Key Victory Bell)	L 7–27		
*Non-conference game; ^{†}Homecoming
