= 1939 Ball State Cardinals football team =

American college football season

1939 Ball State Cardinals football
- Conference: Indiana Intercollegiate Conference
- Record: 6–2 (5–1 IIC)
- Head coach: John Magnabosco (5th season)
- Home stadium: Ball State Field

1939 Indiana Intercollegiate Conference football standings
	Conf.					Overall
Team	W		L		T	W		L		T
Butler $	4	–	0	–	0	7	–	0	–	1
Ball State	5	–	1	–	0	6	–	2	–	0
Manchester	4	–	1	–	0	7	–	1	–	0
Rose Poly	3	–	1	–	1	5	–	3	–	1
Earlham	5	–	2	–	0	5	–	2	–	0
Saint Joseph's (IN)	2	–	1	–	0	4	–	3	–	0
DePauw	3	–	2	–	1	4	–	3	–	1
Hanover	3	–	3	–	0	4	–	4	–	0
Wabash	2	–	3	–	1	3	–	5	–	1
Central Normal	1	–	3	–	0	2	–	4	–	0
Valparaiso	1	–	3	–	0	2	–	6	–	0
Franklin (IN)	1	–	7	–	0	1	–	7	–	0
Evansville	0	–	4	–	1	1	–	6	–	1
Indiana State	0	–	3	–	0	2	–	6	–	0
$ – Conference champion

The 1939 Ball State Cardinals football team was an American football team that represented Ball State Teachers College (later renamed Ball State University) in the Indiana Intercollegiate Conference (IIC) during the 1939 college football season. In their fifth season under head coach John Magnabosco, the Cardinals compiled a 6–2 record (5–1 against IIC opponents), finished in second place out of 14 teams in the IIC, and outscored all opponents by a total of 112 to 69.

Ball State was ranked at No. 237 (out of 609 teams) in the final Litkenhous Ratings for 1939.

The team played its home games at Ball State Field in Muncie, Indiana.

== Schedule ==
Date	Opponent	Site	Result	Attendance	Source
September 23	at Butler	Butler Bowl; Indianapolis, IN	L 0–16		
September 30	Grand Rapids*	Ball State Field; Muncie, IN	W 27–6		
October 7	Saint Joseph's (IN)	Ball State Field; Muncie, IN	W 6–0		
October 21	at Indiana State	Terre Haute, IN (rivalry)	W 29–6		
October 27	at Central Michigan*	Alumni Field; Mount Pleasant, MI	L 0–7		
November 4	at Earlham	Richmond, IN	W 14–13		
November 11	Valparaiso	Ball State Field; Muncie, IN	W 16–7		
November 18	Manchester	Ball State Field; Muncie, IN	W 20–14		
*Non-conference game
