= 1933 DePauw Tigers football team =

American college football season

1933 DePauw Tigers football

IIC champion
- Conference: Indiana Intercollegiate Conference
- Record: 7–0 (7–0 IIC)
- Head coach: Ray Neal (4th season)
- Home stadium: Blackstock Field

1933 Indiana Intercollegiate Conference football standings
	Conf.					Overall
Team	W		L		T	W		L		T
DePauw $	7	–	0	–	0	7	–	0	–	0
Valparaiso	3	–	0	–	0	7	–	1	–	0
Indiana State	6	–	1	–	0	7	–	1	–	0
Hanover	5	–	1	–	0	6	–	2	–	0
Wabash	4	–	2	–	1	4	–	2	–	1
Central Normal	3	–	2	–	0	4	–	2	–	1
Oakland City	3	–	2	–	0	3	–	3	–	0
Butler	2	–	3	–	0	2	–	6	–	0
Gary	1	–	2	–	0	2	–	3	–	0
Evansville	2	–	4	–	1	2	–	5	–	1
Franklin (IN)	2	–	4	–	1	2	–	5	–	1
Earlham	1	–	3	–	0	3	–	3	–	0
Manchester	1	–	3	–	0	1	–	5	–	1
Ball State	1	–	6	–	1	1	–	6	–	1
Rose Poly	0	–	8	–	0	0	–	8	–	0
$ – Conference champion

The 1933 DePauw Tigers football team was an American football team that represented DePauw University as a member of the Indiana Intercollegiate Conference (IIC) during the 1933 college football season. In its fourth season under head coach Ray "Gaumy" Neal, the team compiled a 7–0 record, did not allow its opponents to score a point, and outscored opponents by a total of 136 to 0.

The team played its six home games at Blackstock Field in Greencastle, Indiana.

== Schedule ==
Date	Opponent	Site	Result	Attendance	Source
October 7	Ball State	Blackstock Field; Greencastle, IN	W 9–0		
October 14	Earlham	Blackstock Field; Greencastle, IN	W 28–0		
October 21	Manchester^{†}	Blackstock Field; Greencastle, IN	W 13–0	4,000	
October 28	Hanover	Blackstock Field; Greencastle, IN	W 12–0		
November 4	Franklin (IN)	Blackstock Field; Greencastle, IN	W 26–0		
November 11	at Evansville	Evansville, IN	W 34–0		
November 18	Wabash	Blackstock Field; Greencastle, IN (Monon Bell)	W 14–0	4,000	
^{†}Homecoming
