= 1930 Ball State Cardinals football team =

American college football season

1930 Ball State Cardinals football
- Conference: Indiana Intercollegiate Conference
- Record: 6–1 (6–1 IIC)
- Head coach: Lawrence McPhee (1st season)
- Home stadium: Ball State Field

1930 Indiana Intercollegiate Conference football standings
	Conf.					Overall
Team	W		L		T	W		L		T
DePauw $	5	–	0	–	0	6	–	1	–	0
Butler	2	–	0	–	0	2	–	7	–	0
Rose Poly	7	–	1	–	0	7	–	1	–	0
Ball State	6	–	1	–	0	6	–	1	–	0
Manchester	5	–	1	–	0	6	–	2	–	0
Indiana State	5	–	1	–	1	5	–	3	–	1
Evansville	3	–	1	–	1	3	–	3	–	1
Franklin (IN)	3	–	4	–	1	3	–	4	–	1
Wabash	2	–	5	–	0	3	–	6	–	0
Valparaiso	1	–	3	–	0	5	–	4	–	0
Indiana Central	2	–	7	–	0	2	–	7	–	0
Oakland City	1	–	5	–	1	1	–	5	–	1
Hanover	0	–	2	–	2	1	–	4	–	2
Earlham	0	–	5	–	1	1	–	5	–	1
Central Normal	0	–	6	–	1	0	–	6	–	1
$ – Conference champion

The 1930 Ball State Cardinals football team was an American football team that represented Ball State Teachers College (later renamed Ball State University) as a member of the Indiana Intercollegiate Conference during the 1930 college football season. In its first season under head coach Lawrence McPhee, the team compiled a 6–1 record and outscored opponents by a total of 136 to 32.

== Schedule ==
Date	Opponent	Site	Result	Source
September 27	Valparaiso	Ball State Field; Muncie, IN	W 14–0	
October 11	Oakland City	Ball State Field; Muncie, IN	W 34–6	
October 17	at Central Normal	Danville, IN	W 21–0	
October 24	at Wabash	Crawfordsville, IN	W 14–12	
November 1	at Manchester	North Manchester, IN	L 7–13	
November 8	at Franklin (IN)	Franklin, IN	W 20–0	
November 15	Indiana Central	Ball State Field; Muncie, IN	W 20–7	
