= 1945 Ball State Cardinals football team =

American college football season

1945 Ball State Cardinals football
- Conference: Indiana Intercollegiate Conference
- Record: 4–1–1 (4–1–1 IIC)
- Head coach: John Magnabosco (10th season)
- Home stadium: Ball State Field

1945 Indiana Intercollegiate Conference football standings
| | Conf. | | | | | Overall |
| Team | W | | L | | T | W | | L | | T |
|---|---|---|---|---|---|---|---|---|---|---|
| Valparaiso $ | 4 | – | 0 | – | 0 | 6 | – | 1 | – | 0 |
| DePauw | 1 | – | 0 | – | 0 | 3 | – | 2 | – | 0 |
| Ball State | 4 | – | 1 | – | 1 | 4 | – | 1 | – | 1 |
| Butler | 3 | – | 2 | – | 0 | 3 | – | 3 | – | 0 |
| Earlham | 3 | – | 3 | – | 0 | 3 | – | 3 | – | 0 |
| Wabash | 1 | – | 1 | – | 1 | 2 | – | 3 | – | 1 |
| Central Normal | 2 | – | 3 | – | 0 | 2 | – | 4 | – | 0 |
| Indiana State | 1 | – | 2 | – | 0 | 2 | – | 4 | – | 0 |
| Manchester | 0 | – | 2 | – | 0 | 0 | – | 2 | – | 0 |
| Franklin (IN) | 0 | – | 5 | – | 0 | 0 | – | 5 | – | 0 |
$ – Conference champion

The 1945 Ball State Cardinals football team was an American football team that represented Ball State Teachers College (later renamed Ball State University) in the Indiana Intercollegiate Conference (IIC) during the 1945 college football season. In their 10th season under head coach John Magnabosco, the Cardinals compiled a 4–1–1 record, finished in third place out of 10 teams in the IIC, and outscored opponents by a total of 119 to 27.

== Schedule ==
| Date | Opponent | Site | Result | Source |
|---|---|---|---|---|
| September 29 | Central Normal | Ball State Field; Muncie, IN | W 28–6 | |
| October 6 | Franklin (IN) | Ball State Field; Muncie, IN | W 29–6 | |
| October 13 | at Wabash | Crawfordsville, IN | T 0–0 | |
| October 20 | Valparaiso | Ball State Field; Muncie, IN | L 6–7 | |
| October 27 | at Earlham | Richmond, IN | W 40–6 | |
| November 3 | Butler | Ball State Field; Muncie, IN | W 16–2 | |
