= 1939 Butler Bulldogs football team =

American college football season

1939 Butler Bulldogs football

IIC champion
- Conference: Indiana Intercollegiate Conference
- Record: 7–0–1 (4–0 IIC)
- Head coach: Tony Hinkle (6th season)
- Home stadium: Butler Bowl

1939 Indiana Intercollegiate Conference football standings
	Conf.					Overall
Team	W		L		T	W		L		T
Butler $	4	–	0	–	0	7	–	0	–	1
Ball State	5	–	1	–	0	6	–	2	–	0
Manchester	4	–	1	–	0	7	–	1	–	0
Rose Poly	3	–	1	–	1	5	–	3	–	1
Earlham	5	–	2	–	0	5	–	2	–	0
Saint Joseph's (IN)	2	–	1	–	0	4	–	3	–	0
DePauw	3	–	2	–	1	4	–	3	–	1
Hanover	3	–	3	–	0	4	–	4	–	0
Wabash	2	–	3	–	1	3	–	5	–	1
Central Normal	1	–	3	–	0	2	–	4	–	0
Valparaiso	1	–	3	–	0	2	–	6	–	0
Franklin (IN)	1	–	7	–	0	1	–	7	–	0
Evansville	0	–	4	–	1	1	–	6	–	1
Indiana State	0	–	3	–	0	2	–	6	–	0
$ – Conference champion

The 1939 Butler Bulldogs football team represented Butler University as a member of the Indiana Intercollegiate Conference (IIC) during the 1939 college football season. In their sixth season under head coach Tony Hinkle, the Bulldogs compiled a 7–0–1 record (4–0 against conference opponents) and won the IIC championship.

Butler was ranked at No. 60 (out of 609 teams) in the final Litkenhous Ratings for 1939.

The team played its home games at the Butler Bowl in Indianapolis.

== Schedule ==
Date	Opponent	Site	Result	Attendance	Source
September 23	Ball State	Butler Bowl; Indianapolis, IN	W 16–0		
September 29	Ohio*	Fairview Bowl; Indianapolis, IN	W 12–7	8,000	
October 7	Indiana State	Butler Bowl; Indianapolis, IN	W 34–0		
October 14	George Washington*	Fairview Bowl; Indianapolis, IN	W 13–6	6,000–7,500	
October 21	DePauw	Indianapolis, IN	W 33–0		
October 28	Washington University*	Butler Bowl; Indianapolis, IN	T 6–6		
November 4	Wabash	Fairview Bowl; Indianapolis, IN	W 55–0	9,000	
November 11	at Western State Teachers*	Waldo Stadium; Kalamazoo, MI	W 12–0		
*Non-conference game
