= 1944 Ball State Cardinals football team =

American college football season

1944 Ball State Cardinals football
- Conference: Indiana Intercollegiate Conference
- Record: 2–2 (– IIC)
- Head coach: John Magnabosco (9th season)

1944 Midwestern college football independents records
	Conf.			Overall
Team	W	L	T	W		L		T
Miami (OH)		–		8	–	1	–	0
Michigan State		–		6	–	1	–	0
No. 9 Notre Dame		–		8	–	2	–	0
Central Michigan		–		5	–	2	–	0
Wichita		–		5	–	2	–	1
Bowling Green		–		5	–	3	–	0
Western Michigan		–		4	–	3	–	0
Wayne		–		1	–	1	–	0
Ohio Wesleyan		–		1	–	8	–	1
Marquette		–		1	–	7	–	0
Rankings from AP Poll

The 1944 Ball State Cardinals football team was an American football team that represented Ball State Teachers College (later renamed Ball State University) in the Indiana Intercollegiate Conference during the 1944 college football season. In its ninth season under head coach John Magnabosco, the team compiled a 2–2 record.

Ball State resumed college football in October 1944 after a wartime hiatus that began at the end of the 1942 season. Due to a manpower shortage, coach Magnabosco formed his 1944 team out of students, "most of whom never engaged in the gridiron sport." To draw fans back to the game, the school did not charge for admission to its football games.

Dick Van Landingham proved to be the star of the team's backfield, playing variously at the quarterback and halfback positions.

The team played its home games at Ball State Field, sometimes referred to as Cardinal Field, in Muncie, Indiana.

== Schedule ==
Date	Opponent	Site	Result	Attendance	Source
October 14	Central Normal	Ball State Field; Muncie, IN	L 6–13	2,000	
October 20	Franklin (IN)	Ball State Field; Muncie, IN	W 19–6		
October 28	at Central Normal	Danville, IN	L 6–25		
November 4	Earlham^{†}	Ball State Field; Muncie, IN	W 27–7		
^{†}Homecoming
