= 1936 Ball State Cardinals football team =

American college football season

1936 Ball State Cardinals football
- Conference: Indiana Intercollegiate Conference
- Record: 3–4–1 (3–3–1 IIC)
- Head coach: John Magnabosco (2nd season)
- Home stadium: Ball State Athletic Field

1936 Indiana Intercollegiate Conference football standings
	Conf.					Overall
Team	W		L		T	W		L		T
Butler $	5	–	0	–	0	6	–	0	–	2
Indiana State	2	–	0	–	1	2	–	3	–	2
Wabash	6	–	1	–	0	7	–	1	–	0
Saint Joseph's (IN)	3	–	1	–	1	3	–	1	–	1
Central Normal	4	–	2	–	0	4	–	3	–	0
DePauw	3	–	2	–	2	3	–	3	–	2
Manchester	5	–	3	–	0	5	–	3	–	0
Ball State	3	–	3	–	1	3	–	4	–	1
Franklin (IN)	3	–	4	–	0	3	–	5	–	0
Evansville	2	–	3	–	2	3	–	3	–	2
Valparaiso	1	–	3	–	1	1	–	6	–	1
Hanover	1	–	3	–	0	1	–	6	–	0
Earlham	1	–	4	–	0	2	–	4	–	1
Rose Poly	1	–	5	–	0	2	–	5	–	0
Oakland City	0	–	6	–	0	0	–	8	–	0
$ – Conference champion

The 1936 Ball State Cardinals football team was an American football team that represented Ball State Teachers College (later renamed Ball State University) in the Indiana Intercollegiate Conference (IIC) during the 1936 college football season. In their second season under head coach John Magnabosco, the Cardinals compiled a 3–4–1 record (3–3–1 against IIC opponents), finished in eighth place out of 15 teams in the IIC, and outscored opponents by a total of 78 to 55. The team played its home games at Ball State Athletic Field in Muncie, Indiana.

== Schedule ==
Date	Opponent	Site	Result	Attendance	Source
September 26	at Michigan State Normal*	Normal Field; Ypsilanti, MI	L 0–6		
October 3	Central Normal	Ball State Athletic Field; Muncie, IN	L 6–25		
October 10	Indiana State^{†}	Ball State Athletic Field; Muncie, IN	L 0–3		
October 17	Franklin (IN)	Franklin, IN	W 12–0		
October 24	Oakland City	Ball State Athletic Field; Muncie, IN	W 40–0		
October 31	DePauw	Ball State Athletic Field; Muncie, IN	T 0–0		
November 7	at Manchester	North Manchester, IN	L 13–21		
November 14	Hanover	Ball State Athletic Field; Muncie, IN	W 7–0		
*Non-conference game; ^{†}Homecoming
