= 1942 Ball State Cardinals football team =

American college football season

1942 Ball State Cardinals football

IIC champion
- Conference: Indiana Intercollegiate Conference
- Record: 6–2 (5–0 IIC)
- Head coach: John Magnabosco (8th season)
- Home stadium: Ball State Field

1942 Indiana Intercollegiate Conference football standings
	Conf.					Overall
Team	W		L		T	W		L		T
Ball State +	5	–	0	–	0	6	–	2	–	0
Saint Joseph's (IN) +	3	–	0	–	0	7	–	0	–	1
Rose Poly	4	–	1	–	0	5	–	1	–	0
Wabash	4	–	1	–	0	4	–	2	–	1
DePauw	3	–	1	–	0	5	–	3	–	0
Valparaiso	3	–	2	–	0	4	–	4	–	0
Manchester	2	–	2	–	0	4	–	4	–	0
Hanover	2	–	3	–	0	2	–	5	–	0
Butler	1	–	2	–	0	2	–	7	–	0
Indiana State	1	–	3	–	0	4	–	3	–	0
Evansville	1	–	3	–	0	1	–	4	–	0
Franklin (IN)	1	–	5	–	0	1	–	7	–	0
Central Normal	0	–	3	–	0	0	–	4	–	0
Earlham	0	–	4	–	0	1	–	6	–	0
+ – Conference co-champions

The 1942 Ball State Cardinals football team was an American football team that represented Ball State Teachers College (later renamed Ball State University) as a member of the Indiana Intercollegiate Conference (IIC) during the 1942 college football season. In their eighth season under head coach John Magnabosco, the Cardinals compiled a 6–2 record (5–0 against IIC opponents), won the IIC championship, and outscored opponents by a total of 178 to 58.

Ball State was ranked at No. 274 (out of 590 college and military teams) in the final rankings under the Litkenhous Difference by Score System for 1942.

== Schedule ==
Date	Opponent	Site	Result	Attendance	Source
September 19	Franklin (IN)	Ball State Field; Muncie, IN	W 38–0		
September 26	Central Normal	Ball State Field; Muncie, IN	W 34–0		
October 10	Bowling Green*^{†}	Ball State Field; Muncie, IN	L 14–26		
October 17	Northern Illinois State*	Ball State Field; Muncie, IN	W 14–0		
October 24	at Central Michigan*	Alumni Field; Mount Pleasant, MI	L 13–19		
October 31	at Manchester	North Manchester, IN	W 28–6		
November 7	Valparaiso	Ball State Field; Muncie, IN	W 21–0		
November 14	Indiana State	Ball State Field; Muncie, IN (Blue Key Victory Bell)	W 16–7		
*Non-conference game; ^{†}Homecoming
