= 1933 Ball State Cardinals football team =

American college football season

1933 Ball State Cardinals football
- Conference: Indiana Intercollegiate Conference
- Record: 1–6–1 (1–6–1 IIC)
- Head coach: Lawrence McPhee (4th season)
- Home stadium: Ball State Field

1933 Indiana Intercollegiate Conference football standings
	Conf.					Overall
Team	W		L		T	W		L		T
DePauw $	7	–	0	–	0	7	–	0	–	0
Valparaiso	3	–	0	–	0	7	–	1	–	0
Indiana State	6	–	1	–	0	7	–	1	–	0
Hanover	5	–	1	–	0	6	–	2	–	0
Wabash	4	–	2	–	1	4	–	2	–	1
Central Normal	3	–	2	–	0	4	–	2	–	1
Oakland City	3	–	2	–	0	3	–	3	–	0
Butler	2	–	3	–	0	2	–	6	–	0
Gary	1	–	2	–	0	2	–	3	–	0
Evansville	2	–	4	–	1	2	–	5	–	1
Franklin (IN)	2	–	4	–	1	2	–	5	–	1
Earlham	1	–	3	–	0	3	–	3	–	0
Manchester	1	–	3	–	0	1	–	5	–	1
Ball State	1	–	6	–	1	1	–	6	–	1
Rose Poly	0	–	8	–	0	0	–	8	–	0
$ – Conference champion

The 1933 Ball State Cardinals football team was an American football team that represented Ball State Teachers College (later renamed Ball State University) in the Indiana Intercollegiate Conference (IIC) during the 1933 college football season. In their fourth season under head coach Lawrence McPhee, the Cardinals compiled a 1–6–1 record (overall and in conference), finished in 14th place out of 15 teams in the IIC, and were outscored by a total of 90 to 20. The team played its home games at Ball State Field in Muncie, Indiana.

== Schedule ==
Date	Opponent	Site	Result	Attendance	Source
September 29	at Butler	Fairview Bowl; Indianapolis, IN	L 2–19	4,000	
October 7	at DePauw	Blackstock Field; Greencastle, IN	L 0–9		
October 13	Central Normal	Ball State Field; Muncie, IN	W 6–0		
October 20	Valparaiso	Ball State Field; Muncie, IN	L 0–20		
October 28	Manchester	Ball State Field; Muncie, IN	L 0–7		
November 4	at Indiana State	Terre Haute, IN (rivalry)	L 6–9		
November 11	Franklin (IN)	Ball State Field; Muncie, IN	T 6–6		
November 18	at Hanover	Hanover, IN	L 0–20		
