= 1934 Ball State Cardinals football team =

American college football season

1934 Ball State Cardinals football
- Conference: Indiana Intercollegiate Conference
- Record: 2–6 (2–6 IIC)
- Head coach: Lawrence McPhee (5th season)

1934 Indiana Intercollegiate Conference football standings
	Conf.					Overall
Team	W		L		T	W		L		T
Butler $	6	–	0	–	1	6	–	1	–	1
DePauw	6	–	1	–	0	7	–	1	–	0
Hanover	4	–	1	–	0	7	–	2	–	0
Valparaiso	4	–	1	–	0	6	–	2	–	0
Wabash	4	–	1	–	2	4	–	2	–	2
Earlham	2	–	2	–	0	3	–	4	–	0
Indiana State	3	–	3	–	0	3	–	5	–	0
Evansville	3	–	4	–	1	3	–	4	–	1
Franklin (IN)	3	–	5	–	0	3	–	5	–	0
Manchester	1	–	2	–	0	6	–	2	–	0
Ball State	2	–	6	–	0	2	–	6	–	0
Central Normal	1	–	4	–	0	2	–	5	–	0
Rose Poly	1	–	5	–	0	2	–	6	–	0
Oakland City	0	–	5	–	0	0	–	7	–	0
$ – Conference champion

The 1934 Ball State Cardinals football team was an American football team that represented Ball State Teachers College (later renamed Ball State University) in the Indiana Intercollegiate Conference (IIC) during the 1934 college football season. In its fifth and final season under head coach Lawrence McPhee, the team compiled a 2–6 record.

== Schedule ==
Date	Time	Opponent	Site	Result	Source
September 28	8:15 p.m.	at Butler	Butler Bowl; Indianapolis, IN	L 4–13	
October 5		at Central Normal	Danville, IN	W 20–0	
October 13		DePauw	Muncie, IN	L 0–13	
October 18		at Franklin (IN)	Franklin, IN	L 0–6	
October 27		at Valparaiso	Valparaiso, IN	L 13–30	
November 3		at Manchester	North Manchester, IN	L 0–13	
November 10		Indiana State	Muncie, IN	W 15–6	
November 17		Hanover	Muncie, IN	L 6–19	
All times are in Eastern time
