= 1952 Ball State Cardinals football team =

American college football season

1952 Ball State Cardinals football
- Conference: Indiana Collegiate Conference
- Record: 3–5–1 (3–2 ICC)
- Head coach: John Magnabosco (17th season)
- Home stadium: Ball State Field

1952 Indiana Collegiate Conference football standings
	Conf.					Overall
Team	W		L		T	W		L		T
Butler +	3	–	1	–	1	5	–	3	–	1
Valparaiso +	3	–	1	–	1	5	–	3	–	1
Indiana State	2	–	1	–	2	4	–	1	–	3
Ball State	3	–	2	–	0	3	–	5	–	1
Evansville	2	–	3	–	0	2	–	7	–	0
Saint Joseph's (IN)	0	–	5	–	0	0	–	8	–	0
+ – Conference co-champions

The 1952 Ball State Cardinals football team was an American football team that represented Ball State Teachers College (later renamed Ball State University) in the Indiana Collegiate Conference (ICC) during the 1952 college football season. In its 17th and final season under head coach John Magnabosco, the team compiled a 3–5–1 record and finished in fourth place out of six teams in the ICC.

In April 1953, Ball State's long-time coach Magnabasco suffered a heart attack. Three months later, Magnabosco was replaced as head coach. He had been Ball State's head football coach since 1935.

== Schedule ==
Date	Opponent	Site	Result	Attendance	Source
September 20	at Hanover*	Hanover, IN	T 7–7		
September 27	at Michigan State Normal*	Walter O. Briggs Field; Ypsilanti, MI	L 14–26		
October 4	DePauw*	Ball State Field; Muncie, IN	L 25–40		
October 11	Butler	Ball State Field; Muncie, IN	L 6–28		
October 18	at Indiana State	Memorial Stadium; Terre Haute, IN (Blue Key Victory Bell)	W 33–0		
October 25	at Valparaiso	Valparaiso, IN	L 13–14		
November 1	at Saint Joseph's (IN)	Rensselaer, IN	W 21–6		
November 8	Wabash*	Ball State Field; Muncie, IN	L 19–39		
November 15	at Evansville	Evansville, IN	W 26–7		
*Non-conference game
