= 1962 Ball State Cardinals football team =

American college football season

1962 Ball State Cardinals football
- Conference: Indiana Collegiate Conference
- Record: 4–3–1 (2–3–1 ICC)
- Head coach: Ray Louthen (1st season)
- Home stadium: Ball State Field

1962 Indiana Collegiate Conference football standings
	Conf.					Overall
Team	W		L		T	W		L		T
Butler $	4	–	1	–	1	5	–	2	–	2
Valparaiso	4	–	2	–	0	6	–	3	–	0
Indiana State	4	–	2	–	0	5	–	3	–	0
DePauw	3	–	3	–	0	5	–	4	–	0
Saint Joseph's (IN)	3	–	3	–	0	4	–	4	–	1
Ball State	2	–	3	–	1	4	–	3	–	1
Evansville	0	–	6	–	0	0	–	9	–	0
$ – Conference champion

The 1962 Ball State Cardinals football team was an American football team that represented Ball State College (later renamed Ball State University) in the Indiana Collegiate Conference (ICC) during the 1962 NCAA College Division football season. In its first season under head coach Ray Louthen, the team compiled a 4–3–1 record (2–3–1 against ICC opponents) and finished in sixth place out of seven teams in the ICC.

Sophomore halfback Merv Rettenmund later played Major League Baseball.

== Schedule ==
Date	Opponent	Site	Result	Attendance	Source
September 21	at Eastern Michigan*	Walter O. Briggs Field; Ypsilanti, MI	W 14–0	3,500	
September 29	Butler	Ball State Field; Muncie, IN	T 28–28	10,000	
October 6	at DePauw	Blackstock Stadium; Greencastle, IN	L 6–7	3,000	
October 13	Saint Joseph's (IN)^{†}	Ball State Field; Muncie, IN	W 15–0	10,000	
October 20	at Indiana State	Memorial Stadium; Terre Haute, IN (Blue Key Victory Bell)	L 0–22	1,500	
October 27	Valparaiso	Ball State Field; Muncie, IN	L 6–21	1,400	
November 3	at Evansville	Evansville, IN	W 27–7	1,400	
November 10	Bradley*	Ball State Field; Muncie, IN	W 42–22	3,000	
*Non-conference game; ^{†}Homecoming
