= 1964 Indiana State Sycamores football team =

American college football season

1964 Indiana State Sycamores football

ICC co-champion
- Conference: Indiana Collegiate Conference
- Record: 6–2 (4–2 ICC)
- Head coach: Bill Jones (8th season)
- Home stadium: Memorial Stadium

1964 Indiana Collegiate Conference football standings
| | Conf. | | | | | Overall |
| Team | W | | L | | T | W | | L | | T |
|---|---|---|---|---|---|---|---|---|---|---|
| Indiana State + | 4 | – | 2 | – | 0 | 6 | – | 2 | – | 0 |
| Valparaiso + | 4 | – | 2 | – | 0 | 6 | – | 3 | – | 0 |
| Ball State + | 4 | – | 2 | – | 0 | 5 | – | 3 | – | 0 |
| Butler + | 4 | – | 2 | – | 0 | 4 | – | 4 | – | 0 |
| Evansville + | 4 | – | 2 | – | 0 | 4 | – | 4 | – | 0 |
| DePauw | 1 | – | 5 | – | 0 | 2 | – | 7 | – | 0 |
| Saint Joseph's (IN) | 0 | – | 6 | – | 0 | 0 | – | 8 | – | 0 |
+ – Conference co-champions

The 1964 Indiana State Sycamores football team represented Indiana State University in the 1964 NCAA College Division football season. The Sycamores finished the season with an overall record of 6–2 and finished in a five-way tie for the Indiana Collegiate Conference (ICC) title with a mark of 4–2. This remains conference championship for the Indiana State Sycamores football program. Head coach Bill Jones was in his eighth and final season running the program. He finished his collegiate coaching career with a record of 32–37–1 (.464). He was named Indiana Collegiate Conference (ICC) Coach of the Year three times (1959, 1960, 1963) and was inducted into the Indiana Football Hall of Fame in 1981.

Junior All-ICC running back Emmitt "Tank" Tyler, led the team in rushing (682 yds) and total offense (682 yds), while Clarence Reedy led the team in passing. The team also featured All-ICC players such as end Willie Smith, tackle Art Fallon and center John Allen and guard Edgar Freese. Freese was tapped as an All-American wrestler in 1965.

== Schedule ==
| Date | Opponent | Site | Result | Attendance | Source |
|---|---|---|---|---|---|
| September 19 | at Eastern Illinois* | Lincoln Field; Charleston, IL | W 25–14 | 3,436 | |
| September 26 | Illinois State* | Memorial Stadium; Terre Haute, IN | W 26–7 | | |
| October 3 | at Valparaiso^{†} | Memorial Stadium; Terre Haute, IN | W 35–6 | | |
| October 10 | Evansville | Reitz Bowl; Evansville, IN | L 14–20 | | |
| October 17 | at Ball State | Memorial Stadium; Terre Haute, IN (rivalry) | W 17–0 | 10,000 | |
| October 24 | Butler | Butler Bowl; Indianapolis, IN | L 2–7 | | |
| October 31 | at DePauw | Blackstock Stadium; Greencastle, IN | W 6–0 | | |
| November 7 | at Saint Joseph's (IN) | Alumni Stadium; Rensselaer, IN | W 35–8 | | |
*Non-conference game; ^{†}Homecoming
