= 1967 Ball State Cardinals football team =

American college football season

1967 Ball State Cardinals football

ICC champion

Grantland Rice Bowl, L 13–27 vs. Eastern Kentucky
- Conference: Indiana Collegiate Conference
- Record: 7–3 (5–1 ICC)
- Head coach: Ray Louthen (6th season)

1967 Indiana Collegiate Conference football standings
	Conf.					Overall
Team	W		L		T	W		L		T
Ball State $^	5	–	1	–	0	7	–	3	–	0
DePauw	4	–	1	–	1	6	–	2	–	1
Indiana State	4	–	2	–	0	5	–	4	–	0
Saint Joseph's (IN)	3	–	3	–	0	3	–	6	–	0
Evansville	2	–	3	–	1	2	–	5	–	2
Valparaiso	1	–	5	–	0	3	–	6	–	0
Butler	1	–	5	–	0	2	–	7	–	0
$ – Conference champion; ^ – Grantland Rice Bowl participant

The 1967 Ball State Cardinals football team was an American football team that represented Ball State University in the Indiana Collegiate Conference (ICC) during the 1967 NCAA College Division football season. In its sixth season under head coach Ray Louthen, the team compiled a 7–2 record in the regular season and lost to Eastern Kentucky in the 1967 Grantland Rice Bowl.

== Schedule ==
Date	Opponent	Site	Result	Attendance	Source
September 16	Central Missouri State*	Ball State Field; Muncie, IN	W 41–7	9,400	
September 23	at Valparaiso	Brown Field; Valparaiso, IN	W 39–7	5,737	
September 30	Evansville	Muncie, IN	W 31–10	8,250	
October 7	at Northern Illinois*	Huskie Stadium; DeKalb, IL (rivalry)	L 14–28	12,527	
October 14	at DePauw	Greencastle, IN	W 7–3	4,200	
October 21	Butler	Muncie, IN	W 65–7	17,700	
October 28	at Indiana State	Terre Haute, IN (Blue Key Victory Bell)	W 26–24	7,000	
November 4	Saint Joseph's (IN)	Muncie, IN	L 2–7	5,800	
November 11	Southern Illinois*	Muncie, IN	W 24–6	3,100	
December 9	vs. Eastern Kentucky*	Horace Jones Field; Murfreesboro, TN (Grantland Rice Bowl)	L 13–27	7,000	
*Non-conference game
