= 1964 Ball State Cardinals football team =

American college football season

1964 Ball State Cardinals football

ICC co-champion
- Conference: Indiana Collegiate Conference
- Record: 5–3 (4–2 ICC)
- Head coach: Ray Louthen (3rd season)
- Home stadium: Ball State Field

1964 Indiana Collegiate Conference football standings
	Conf.					Overall
Team	W		L		T	W		L		T
Indiana State +	4	–	2	–	0	6	–	2	–	0
Valparaiso +	4	–	2	–	0	6	–	3	–	0
Ball State +	4	–	2	–	0	5	–	3	–	0
Butler +	4	–	2	–	0	4	–	4	–	0
Evansville +	4	–	2	–	0	4	–	4	–	0
DePauw	1	–	5	–	0	2	–	7	–	0
Saint Joseph's (IN)	0	–	6	–	0	0	–	8	–	0
+ – Conference co-champions

The 1964 Ball State Cardinals football team was an American football team that represented Ball State College (later renamed Ball State University) in the Indiana Collegiate Conference (ICC) during the 1964 NCAA College Division football season. In its third season under head coach Ray Louthen, the team compiled a 5–3 record (4–2 against ICC opponents) and finished in an unprecedented five-way tie for the ICC championship.

== Schedule ==
Date	Opponent	Site	Result	Attendance	Source
September 19	Slippery Rock*	Ball State Field; Muncie, IN	W 26–7	9,700	
September 26	Butler	Ball State Field; Muncie, IN	W 28–14	8,540	
October 3	at DePauw	Blackstock Stadium; Greencastle, IN	W 23–20	4,307	
October 10	Saint Joseph's (IN)	Ball State Field; Muncie, IN	W 38–7	11,860	
October 17	at Indiana State	Memorial Stadium; Terre Haute, IN (Blue Key Victory Bell)	L 0–17	10,000	
October 24	Valparaiso	Ball State Field; Muncie, IN	L 22–33	3,000	
October 31	at Evansville	Reitz Bowl; Evansville, IN	W 23–16	3,500	
November 7	Akron*	Ball State Field; Muncie, IN	L 15–25	4,400	
*Non-conference game
