= Ray Neal =

American football player and coach (1897–1977)

Biographical details
- Born: November 1, 1897; Mellott, Indiana, U.S.
- Died: November 25, 1977 (aged 80); Greencastle, Indiana, U.S.

Playing career
- ?: Washington & Jefferson
- ?–1919: Wabash
- 1922: Akron Pros
- 1924–1926: Hammond Pros
- Positions: End, tackle, guard

Coaching career (HC unless noted)
- 1930–1945: DePauw

Head coaching record
- Overall: 79–34–7

Raymond Robert "Gaumey" Neal (November 1, 1897 – November 25, 1977) was an American football coach and player. He served as the head coach for the DePauw Tigers at DePauw University for 16 seasons. Prior to that, he played four seasons in the National Football League (NFL) with the Akron Pros and the Hammond Pros.

== Biography ==
Neal was born on November 1, 1897, in Mellott, Indiana. He attended Mellott High School and Wingate High School. Neal attended Washington & Jefferson College, where he played in the 1922 Rose Bowl, before transferring to Wabash College where he served as the football team captain. He graduated from Wabash in 1920.

Neal played four seasons in the National Football League. In 1922, he played for the Akron Pros, where he saw action in ten games, including six starts. From 1924 to 1926, Neal played for the Hammond Pros. He started five games each in 1924 and 1925, and in the latter, recovered one fumble that he returned for a touchdown. He started in two games in 1926.

In 1930, Neal was hired as the head football coach at DePauw University. He coached the 1933 team to an undefeated, untied, and unscored upon season. The Tigers outscored their opponents, 136–0, and finished the season with a 7–0 record. In 1946, he resigned as coach to become DePauw's athletic director and Department of Physical Education chairman. He retired from that position in 1954 and became the postmaster of Greencastle, Indiana. Neal died in 1977. He was inducted into the Indiana Football Hall of Fame in 1977, the Wabash College Athletic Hall of Fame in 1984, and the DePauw Athletic Hall of Fame as a coach in 1986.

== Head coaching record ==
Year	Team	Overall	Conference	Standing	Bowl/playoffs
DePauw Tigers (Indiana Intercollegiate Conference) (1930–1945)
1930	DePauw	6–1			
1931	DePauw	7–1			
1932	DePauw	3–4–1			
1933	DePauw	7–0	7–0	1st	
1934	DePauw	7–1	6–1	2nd	
1935	DePauw	5–1–2	5–0–2	2nd	
1936	DePauw	3–3–2	3–2–2	6th	
1937	DePauw	7–1	7–1	2nd	
1938	DePauw	5–3	4–2	T–4th	
1939	DePauw	4–3–1	3–2–1	7th	
1940	DePauw	3–4	3–3	8th	
1941	DePauw	6–2	3–2	6th	
1942	DePauw	5–3	3–1	5th	
1943	DePauw	5–0–1			
1944	DePauw	3–5			
1945	DePauw	3–2	1–0	2nd	
DePauw:		79–34–7			
Total:		79–34–7			
National championship Conference title Conference division title or championship game berth
