= 1964 Akron Zips football team =

American college football season

1964 Akron Zips football
- Conference: Ohio Athletic Conference
- Record: 6–3 (4–3 OAC)
- Head coach: Gordon K. Larson (4th season)
- Captain: Dick Case
- Home stadium: Rubber Bowl

1964 Ohio Athletic Conference football standings
| | Conf. | | | | | Overall |
| Team | W | | L | | T | W | | L | | T |
|---|---|---|---|---|---|---|---|---|---|---|
| No. 1 Wittenberg $ | 7 | – | 0 | – | 0 | 8 | – | 0 | – | 0 |
| Capital | 7 | – | 1 | – | 0 | 7 | – | 1 | – | 0 |
| Muskingum | 7 | – | 1 | – | 0 | 8 | – | 2 | – | 0 |
| Otterbein | 4 | – | 3 | – | 0 | 6 | – | 3 | – | 0 |
| Akron | 4 | – | 3 | – | 0 | 6 | – | 3 | – | 0 |
| Baldwin–Wallace | 3 | – | 2 | – | 0 | 5 | – | 4 | – | 0 |
| Denison | 3 | – | 3 | – | 0 | 6 | – | 3 | – | 0 |
| Mount Union | 3 | – | 3 | – | 0 | 4 | – | 5 | – | 0 |
| Wooster | 3 | – | 4 | – | 0 | 5 | – | 4 | – | 0 |
| Hiram | 2 | – | 4 | – | 0 | 3 | – | 5 | – | 0 |
| Heidelberg | 2 | – | 4 | – | 0 | 3 | – | 5 | – | 1 |
| Oberlin | 1 | – | 4 | – | 0 | 3 | – | 5 | – | 0 |
| Marietta | 1 | – | 4 | – | 0 | 2 | – | 7 | – | 0 |
| Ohio Wesleyan | 1 | – | 5 | – | 0 | 2 | – | 7 | – | 0 |
| Kenyon | 0 | – | 6 | – | 0 | 0 | – | 8 | – | 0 |
$ – Conference champion; Rankings from AP small college poll

The 1964 Akron Zips football team represented Akron University in the 1964 NCAA College Division football season as a member of the Ohio Athletic Conference. Led by fourth-year head coach Gordon K. Larson, the Zips played their home games at the Rubber Bowl in Akron, Ohio. They finished the season with a record of 6–3 overall and 4–3 in OAC play. They outscored their opponents 116–109.

== Schedule ==
| Date | Opponent | Site | Result | Attendance | Source |
|---|---|---|---|---|---|
| September 19 | at Muskingum | McConagha Stadium; New Concord, OH | L 0–11 | 2,250 | |
| September 26 | Southwest Missouri State* | Rubber Bowl; Akron, OH | W 17–0 | 38,565 | |
| October 3 | at Ohio Wesleyan | Selby Field; Delaware, OH | W 12–11 | 5,000 | |
| October 10 | No. 1 Wittenberg | Rubber Bowl; Akron, OH | L 0–7 | 5,512 | |
| October 17 | Wooster | Rubber Bowl; Akron, OH | W 21–14 | 4,040 | |
| October 24 | at Capital | Bexley, OH | L 6–23 | 2,500 | |
| October 31 | Baldwin–Wallace | Rubber Bowl; Akron, OH | W 15–14 | 4,529 | |
| November 7 | at Ball State* | Muncie, IN | W 25–15 | 4,400 | |
| November 14 | Heidelberg | Rubber Bowl; Akron, OH | W 20–14 | 3,000 | |
*Non-conference game; Rankings from AP Poll released prior to the game
