= Elmer Louis Hoehn =

American politician (1915–2017)

Member of the Indiana House of Representatives
- In office November 8, 1944 – November 3, 1948

Personal details
- Born: December 19, 1915 Memphis, Indiana, U.S.
- Died: September 30, 2017 (aged 101)
- Party: Democratic
- Education: Canterbury College

Elmer Louis Hoehn (December 19, 1915 – September 30, 2017) was an American politician. He served as a Democratic member of the Indiana House of Representatives.

== Life and career ==
Hoehn was born in Memphis, Indiana. He attended Canterbury College.

Hoehn served in the Indiana House of Representatives from 1944 to 1948.

Hoehn died in September 2017, at the age of 101.
