= Lawrence McPhee =

American football player and coach (1899–1983)

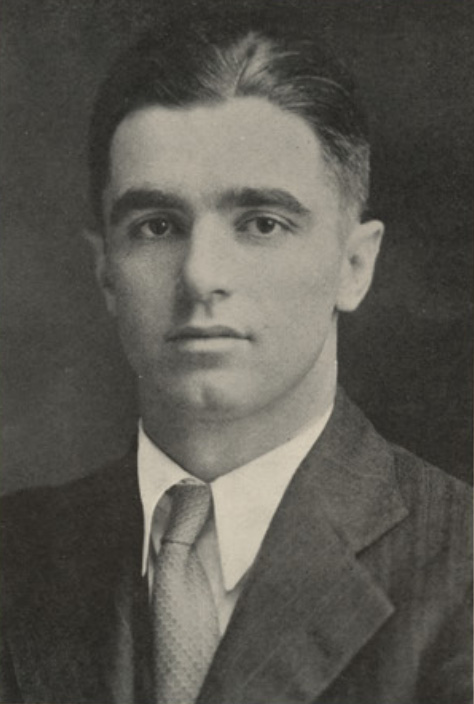
- McPhee pictured in Orient 1929, Ball State yearbook

Biographical details
- Born: February 18, 1899; New Castle, Pennsylvania, U.S.
- Died: November 27, 1983 (aged 84); Austintown, Ohio, U.S.

Playing career
- 1918–1921: Oberlin
- Position: Halfback

Coaching career (HC unless noted)
- 1922–1923: Oberlin
- 1930–1934: Ball State

Head coaching record
- Overall: 25–27–2

Lawrence D. "Mickey" McPhee (February 18, 1899 – November 27, 1983) was an American football player and coach. He served as the head football coach at Oberlin College from 1922 to 1923 and at Ball State Teachers College—now known as Ball State University—from 1930 to 1934, compiling a career college football record of 25–27–2.

McPhee was born in New Castle, Pennsylvania on February 18, 1899. He played football at Oberlin as a halfback and was named All-Ohio in 1921. McPhee died on at the age of 84 on November 27, 1983, at the Austin Woods Nursing Home in Austintown, Ohio.

== Head coaching record ==
Year	Team	Overall	Conference	Standing	Bowl/playoffs
Oberlin Congregationalists (Ohio Athletic Conference) (1922–1923)
1922	Oberlin	6–1	5–0	2nd	
1923	Oberlin	4–3–1	3–3–1	T–8th	
Oberlin:		10–4–1	8–3–1		
Ball State Cardinals (Indiana Intercollegiate Conference) (1930–1934)
1930	Ball State	6–1			
1931	Ball State	2–6			
1932	Ball State	4–4			
1933	Ball State	1–6–1	1–6–1	14th	
1934	Ball State	2–6	2–6	11th	
Ball State:		15–23–1			
Total:		25–27–2			
