= 1967 Grantland Rice Bowl =

- 1967 program cover
Eastern Kentucky Colonels	Ball State Cardinals
(7–1–2)	(7–2)
Ohio Valley Conference	Indiana Collegiate Conference
27	13
Head coach: Roy Kidd	Head coach: Ray Louthen
	1	2	3	4	Total
Eastern Kentucky	13	0	7	7	27
Ball State	0	7	0	6	13
- Date: December 9, 1967
- Season: 1967
- Stadium: Horace Jones Field
- Location: Murfreesboro, Tennessee
- Attendance: 7,000

The 1967 Grantland Rice Bowl was an NCAA College Division game following the 1967 season, between the Eastern Kentucky Colonels and the Ball State Cardinals. Eastern Kentucky quarterback Jim Guice was named the game's most outstanding player.

== Notable participants ==
Ball State tackle Oscar Lubke and guard Elie Ghattas were selected in the 1968 NFL/AFL draft, as was Eastern Kentucky wide receiver Aaron Marsh. Ball State running back Amos Van Pelt was selected in the 1969 NFL/AFL draft.

Eastern Kentucky head coach Roy Kidd was inducted to the College Football Hall of Fame in 2003.

== Scoring summary ==
Scoring summary

Quarter	Time	Drive			Team	Scoring information	Score	
Quarter	Time	Plays	Yards	TOP	Team	Scoring information	EKU	Ball St.
1	9:58	11	69		EKU	John Tazel 15-yard touchdown reception from Jim Guice, Walt Murphy kick no good (blocked)	6	0
1	5:58	5	31		EKU	Jim Guice 5-yard touchdown run, Walt Murphy kick good	13	0
2	13:10	15	67		Ball St.	Amos Van Pelt 3-yard touchdown run, Harold Canady kick good	13	7
3	14:12				EKU	Interception returned 35 yards for touchdown by Teddy Taylor, Walt Murphy kick good	20	7
4	14:54	14	97		EKU	Ted Holcomb 23-yard touchdown reception from Jim Guice, Walt Murphy kick good	27	7
4	9:06	13	73		Ball St.	Jim Novar 12-yard touchdown run, Harold Canady kick no good	27	13
"TOP" = time of possession. For other American football terms, see Glossary of American football.							27	13
