= John Magnabosco =

American football player and coach (1905–1956)

- Magnabosco picture in Orient 1936, Ball State yearbook

Biographical details
- Born: 1906; Clinton, Indiana, U.S.
- Died: October 15, 1956 (aged 49); Muncie, Indiana, U.S.

Playing career
- 1927–1929: Indiana

Coaching career (HC unless noted)
- 1931–1934: Clinton HS (IN)
- 1935–1952: Ball State

Head coaching record
- Overall: 68–46–14 (college); 34–3–3 (high school)

Accomplishments and honors

Championships
- 1 IIC (1942)

John V. Magnabosco (1906 – October 15, 1956) was an American football player and coach. He served as the head football coach at Ball State Teachers College—now known as Ball State University—from 1935 to 1952, compiling a record of 68–46–14. From 1931 to 1934, he was the head football coach at Clinton High School in Clinton, Indiana, where he won three state championships. Magnabosco died of a heart attack at the Ball State gymnasium on October 15, 1956, in Muncie, Indiana.

== Head coaching record ==
=== High school ===
Year	Team	Overall	Conference	Standing	Bowl/playoffs
Clinton High School Wildcats () (1931–1934)
1931	Clinton	9–1–1			
1932	Clinton	9–1			
1933	Clinton	9–0–1			
1934	Clinton	7–1–1			
Clinton:		34–3–3			
Total:		34–3–3			

=== College ===
Year	Team	Overall	Conference	Standing	Bowl/playoffs
Ball State Cardinals (Indiana Intercollegiate Conference) (1935–1946)
1935	Ball State	3–4–1	3–4–1	8th	
1936	Ball State	3–4–1	3–3–1	8th	
1937	Ball State	5–2–1	5–1–1	4th	
1938	Ball State	6–1–1	6–1–1	3rd	
1939	Ball State	6–2	5–1	2nd	
1940	Ball State	3–4–1	2–3	T–9th	
1941	Ball State	3–2–2	3–1–1	T–3rd	
1942	Ball State	6–2	5–0	1st	
1943	No team—World War II				
1944	Ball State	2–2			
1945	Ball State	4–1–1	4–1–1	3rd	
1946	Ball State	3–4–1	3–3	T–7th	
Ball State Cardinals (Independent) (1947–1950)
1947	Ball State	5–1–2			
1948	Ball State	6–2			
1949	Ball State	8–0			
1950	Ball State	2–4–1			
Ball State Cardinals (Indiana Collegiate Conference) (1951–1952)
1951	Ball State	0–6–1	0–4–1	6th	
1952	Ball State	3–5–1	3–2	T–3rd	
Ball State:		68–46–14			
Total:		68–46–14			
