= Ray Louthen =

American football and baseball player, coach, and administrator

Biographical details
- Born: October 4, 1925; Bluefield, Virginia, U.S.
- Died: December 3, 2004 (aged 79); Muncie, Indiana, U.S.

Playing career

Football
- 1944: Western Michigan

Baseball
- 1944: Western Michigan
- 1945: Michigan
- 1946: Beaumont Exporters
- 1946: Kansas City Blues
- 1947: Quincy Gems
- 1948: Augusta Tigers
- 1948: Kansas City Blues
- 1949: Sioux City Soos
- 1949: Beaumont Exporters
- Position: Pitcher (baseball)

Coaching career (HC unless noted)

Football
- c. 1950: Chelsea HS (MI)
- ?–1957: Flint Central HS (MI) (line)
- 1958–1960: Ball State (assistant)
- 1962–1967: Ball State base

Baseball
- ?–1958: Flint Central HS (MI)
- 1959–1970: Ball State

Administrative career (AD unless noted)
- 1970–1981: Ball State

Head coaching record
- Overall: 37–13–3 (college football); 158–127–1 (college baseball); 12–3–1 (high school football)
- Bowls: 0–1–1

Accomplishments and honors

Championships
- Football; 4 ICC (1964–1967)

Raymond A. "Red" Louthen (October 4, 1925 – December 3, 2004) was an American football and baseball player, coach, and college athletics administrator. He served as the head football coach at Ball State University from 1962 to 1967, compiling a record of 37–13–3. Louthen was also the head baseball coach at Ball State from 1959 to 1970, tallying a mark of 158–127–1.

== Coaching career ==
=== College baseball ===
Louthen was the head baseball coach at Ball State from 1959 to 1970; he was a 3-time Indiana Collegiate Conference Coach of the Year (1960, 1961, 1962.) He coached six ICC MVPs (Dean Campbell, Mike Readnour, Homer Jackson, Frank Houk, Ed Sherry and Jim Roudebush) and 19 All-ICC players. Two of his players reached the major leagues; Merv Rettenmund and Steve Hargan.

== Head coaching record ==
=== College football ===
| Year | Team | Overall | Conference | Standing | Bowl/playoffs |
|---|---|---|---|---|---|
Ball State Cardinals (Indiana Collegiate Conference) (1962–1967)
| 1962 | Ball State | 4–3–1 | 2–3–1 | 6th | |
| 1963 | Ball State | 5–3 | 4–2 | 2nd | |
| 1964 | Ball State | 5–3 | 4–2 | T–1st | |
| 1965 | Ball State | 9–0–1 | 6–0 | 1st | T Grantland Rice |
| 1966 | Ball State | 7–1–1 | 5–0–1 | 1st | |
| 1967 | Ball State | 7–3 | 5–1 | 1st | L Grantland Rice |
| Ball State: | | 37–13–3 | 26–8–2 | | |
| Total: | | 37–13–3 | | | |
National championship Conference title Conference division title or championship game berth
