= Mike Uremovich =

American football coach (born 1976)

Current position
- Title: Head coach
- Team: Ball State
- Conference: MAC
- Record: 7–16

Biographical details
- Born: August 21, 1976 (age 50); Gary, Indiana, U.S.
- Education: Purdue (B.A.); Northern Illinois (M.A.)

Coaching career (HC unless noted)
- 1996–1997: McCutcheon HS (IN) (ST/DB)
- 1998–1999: Providence Catholic HS (IL) (WR)
- 2000: Benedictine (WR/ST)
- 2001–2003: Northern Illinois (GA)
- 2003–2004: Waynesburg (OC)
- 2005–2011: St. Francis (IL)
- 2012: Northern Illinois (RB/ST)
- 2013–2015: NC State (OL)
- 2016: Northern Illinois (AHC/OC/RB)
- 2017–2018: Northern Illinois (AHC/OC/TE/FB)
- 2019–2021: Temple (co-OC/TE)
- 2022–2024: Butler
- 2025–present: Ball State

Head coaching record
- Overall: 63–72
- Tournaments: 1–1 (NAIA)

Accomplishments and honors

Championships
- MSFA Midwest League (2011)

Mike Uremovich (you-REM-OH-vitch; born August 21, 1976) is an American college football coach. He is the head football coach at Ball State University, a position he had held since the 2025 season. Played football at Providence Catholic High School. He previously served as the head coach at the University of St. Francis in Joliet, Illinois from 2005 to 2011, and Butler University from 2022 to 2024. Prior to Butler, Uremovich was the offensive coordinator at Northern Illinois University and Temple University under Rod Carey.

== Head coaching record ==
| Year | Team | Overall | Conference | Standing | Bowl/playoffs | NAIA^{#} |
|---|---|---|---|---|---|---|
St. Francis Fighting Saints (Mid-States Football Association) (2005–2011)
| 2005 | St. Francis | 2–9 | 0–7 | 8th (MWL) | | |
| 2006 | St. Francis | 1–9 | 1–7 | 8th (MWL) | | |
| 2007 | St. Francis | 3–8 | 3–4 | 6th (MWL) | | |
| 2008 | St. Francis | 7–4 | 3–4 | 5th (MWL) | | |
| 2009 | St. Francis | 3–8 | 2–5 | 6th (MWL) | | |
| 2010 | St. Francis | 7–4 | 5–2 | 3rd (MWL) | | |
| 2011 | St. Francis | 10–3 | 6–1 | T–1st (MWL) | L NAIA Quarterfinal | 8 |
| St. Francis: | | 33–45 | 20–30 | | | |
Butler Bulldogs (Pioneer Football League) (2022–2024)
| 2022 | Butler | 7–4 | 5–3 | 4th | | |
| 2023 | Butler | 7–4 | 5–3 | 4th | | |
| 2024 | Butler | 9–3 | 5–3 | T–3rd | | |
| Butler: | | 23–11 | 15–9 | | | |
Ball State Cardinals (Mid-American Conference) (2025–present)
| 2025 | Ball State | 4–8 | 3–5 | T–9th | | |
| 2026 | Ball State | 3–8 | 2–5 | | | |
| Ball State: | | 7–16 | 5–10 | | | |
| Total: | | 63–72 | | | | |
National championship Conference title Conference division title or championship game berth
