= Indiana Intercollegiate Conference =

American college athletic conference

- Founded: 1922
- Folded: 1950
- Sports fielded: 8
- No. of teams: 17 (charter), 30 (total)
- Headquarters: Terre Haute, Indiana

The Indiana Intercollegiate Conference (IIC) was a men's college athletic conference in the United States, formed in 1922 to govern intercollegiate competition in the state of Indiana.

The IIC was the third state-based collegiate athletic conference attempted in Indiana, after the Indiana Intercollegiate Athletic Association (IIAA) and the Indiana College Athletic League (ICAL), but had many more members than its predecessors. The size and diversity of the IIC made it a loosely-constructed organization and doomed it to fail in the long run. Most of its members ended up joining the Hoosier College Conference (established 1947) or the Indiana Collegiate Conference (established 1950).

== Founding ==
The official founding of the Indiana Intercollegiate Conference occurred at a meeting held on December 9, 1922, at the Claypool Hotel in Indianapolis. The 17 charter members were Indiana, Purdue, Notre Dame, Ball State, Butler, DePauw, Earlham, Evansville, Franklin, Hanover, Indiana Dental College, Indiana State, Manchester, the Normal College of the American Gymnastics Union (NCAGU), Oakland City, Rose Polytechnic, and Wabash.

The three largest member institutions—Indiana, Purdue, and Notre Dame—were key to its creation, even though they did not participate in IIC team sports once conference standings were kept. At the time, during the formative years of college athletics, the NCAA left questions of student-athlete eligibility to the conferences and to individual schools. Compounding the confusion, with few exceptions only the largest public universities and the most elite private schools even belonged to the NCAA. Indiana and Purdue operated under the eligibility rules of the Big Ten, then known as the Western Conference, and independent Notre Dame, for the sake of scheduling games with Big Ten teams, followed their rules too. But all three rounded out their schedules with games against smaller Indiana colleges, none of which was subject to the same eligibility standards, in particular the Western Conference's ban on freshmen participating in varsity contests. This issue had flared up before, in 1907, precipitating the demise of the IIAA, and came to a head again at the 1921 annual meeting of the Big Ten in Chicago, when "it was observed that schools not belonging to any recognized body were not welcome on Big Ten schedules." The problem could be solved only by creating a "recognized body" that would maintain standards for the smaller Indiana colleges, thus making them acceptable as non-conference opponents for Indiana and Purdue, as well as for Notre Dame. The smaller colleges, many of which were eager to keep their prestigious and/or lucrative games with the "big three" and other Big Ten schools, became motivated partners in this process.

The conference was created largely through the work of Purdue athletic director Nelson A. Kellogg, who led several organizing meetings during the first half of 1922. He hosted and presided over a session in May 1922 at which Notre Dame's Knute Rockne served as secretary. At another meeting the following month, again at Purdue, Kellogg and Rockne joined William M. Blanchard of DePauw and representatives from Butler and Wabash in drafting a constitution and eligibility standards. At the official founding meeting that December, Kellogg was confirmed as president of the league, Blanchard was elected vice-president, and Birch Bayh of Indiana State was elected secretary-treasurer. While at the meeting, the coaches of member institutions finalized their schedules for the 1922–23 season in basketball and the 1923 seasons in baseball, track, and football. The IIC continued to hold annual meetings at the Claypool Hotel in Indianapolis every December, at which officers would be chosen and schedules finalized (with schedules eventually done a year in advance). In later years, the IIC added an annual spring meeting, typically held at the end of basketball season in March.

== History ==
In 1923, the conference expanded from 17 members to 20 by adding Huntington in the spring, then Indiana Central (today the University of Indianapolis) and Central Normal (eventually renamed Canterbury College) at the end of the year. Thereafter, the IIC usually had at least 20 active members except during the years of World War II. Valparaiso joined in 1927 and Taylor in 1933. Anderson, Concordia, and St. Joseph's all joined in 1935. Indiana Dental College (in 1925) and NCAGU (in 1941) left the league when they were absorbed by Indiana University. The IIC also admitted three junior colleges, none of which remained in the conference for long. Vincennes was a member from 1924 until temporarily dropping athletics in 1932. Gary Junior College (today Indiana University Northwest) joined upon its creation in 1932 but left two years later. Kokomo Junior College (today Indiana University Kokomo), also founded in 1932, joined in 1938 but dropped out in 1940. Tri-State (today Trine University) likewise joined in 1938 and dropped out in 1940, but was readmitted in 1946. Indiana Tech was the only other postwar addition, in 1947.

In its first year of operation (1922–23) the IIC crowned champions in basketball, baseball, and track. Football, cross country, and tennis were added in 1923–24, and the first conference golf championship was held at the end of the 1924–25 school year. The IIC eventually added swimming as an 8th sport, but conference swim meets were not always held on an annual basis (for example, in 1940 at Indiana and in 1942 at Purdue, but no meet in 1941).

Because Notre Dame (unlike Indiana and Purdue) had no conference affiliation other than the IIC, press reports called the November 1923 football game between the Fighting Irish (whose lone in-state win was against Purdue) and Butler (4–0 in the IIC) "a battle for the championship of the Indiana Intercollegiate Conference." Notre Dame won it, and finished the season with a 9–1 record. The following year, Rockne's team, led by the Four Horsemen, shut out their only IIC opponent (Wabash) en route to an undefeated national championship season, and were once again hailed as "the Indiana conference champion." Notre Dame never scheduled an IIC football opponent again, making its further eligibility for conference championships a moot point. Without the Fighting Irish, the 1925 season featured four undefeated teams and no clear champion, and also foreshadowed the IIC's fundamental incoherence as a conference: Central Normal joined Evansville in going unbeaten in IIC play, each without playing another winning team, while Butler and Wabash were also undefeated (tying each other) with their only non-conference losses coming against Big Ten squads. Butler ultimately dominated the league in football, especially in the years before World War II, winning seven straight titles from 1934 through 1940. Tony Hinkle, better known as a basketball coach, doubled as the Bulldogs' football coach during those years. Nine Butler players from the IIC era went on to play at least one season in the NFL.

In basketball, IIC teams made an immediate splash on the national scene. In 1922–23, Franklin's Wonder Five, coached by the legendary Ernest "Griz" Wagner, lost only to Indiana and were recognized as national champions. The following year they lost only to Butler, also considered a national power. At a time when there were no postseason collegiate tournaments, some college teams competed in the national AAU tournament, which the Bulldogs won at the end of the 1923–24 season, defeating the Kansas City Athletic Club in the final. The last great IIC team of the pre-tournament era, Tony Hinkle's 1928–29 Butler squad, went 17–2 and was awarded the John J. McDevitt Trophy, emblematic of the national championship. After the creation of the National Association for Intercollegiate Basketball (NAIB), an organization that eventually evolved into the NAIA, IIC members appeared regularly in the annual NAIB national tournaments. By 1950, when Indiana State won the NAIB title, teams from nine IIC member institutions had made a total of 17 appearances in the tournament over 13 seasons. The Sycamores led the way with six appearances, guided by future UCLA head coach John Wooden (until 1948), then John Longfellow. Their stars included Duane Klueh, who went on to play in the NBA after its founding in 1949. No IIC team ever competed in the NCAA tournament or the NIT. (The NCAA College Division tournament was not held until 1957).

While they did not compete for IIC championships in team sports, Indiana, Purdue, and Notre Dame contested (and often hosted) the annual IIC tournaments in tennis and golf, as well as the IIC meets in cross country and (eventually) swimming. The conference always held two track meets, "Big State" (hosted by one of the "big three," but open to all IIC members) and "Little State" (hosted at one of the smaller colleges, and open to all members except the "big three"). They were held annually on consecutive weekends in May, starting in 1923 and continuing until 1950, when "Big State" was cancelled in favor of a three-way meet between Indiana, Purdue, and Notre Dame. While Butler and DePauw dominated "Little State," Notre Dame and Indiana dominated "Big State." One of the "big three" always won "Big State," and after the 1920s it was unusual for the three major universities not to take the top three places at the meet. The IIC eventually applied the same model to cross country, tennis, and golf, crowning separate "big" and "little" champions in those sports as well.

At the insistence of the "big three," the eligibility standards of the IIC mirrored those of the Big Ten, including the same ban on freshman participation in varsity sports that had divided its predecessor, the IIAA, years earlier. Technically a "one year rule" (requiring a student to be in residence for a year in order to qualify for varsity competition), it also required all transfer students to sit out a year before playing for their new institution. It became clear right away that the rule posed a serious burden to the conference's smaller members and an obstacle to other small colleges joining the league. At the second annual meeting of the IIC, in December 1923, a proposal to allow members with small enrollments to petition to use freshmen in varsity contests passed by a vote of 16–1. Ten such waivers were granted for 1923–24. The submission and approval of waiver requests became a major item of business at subsequent annual meetings. Finally, after the Great Depression caused a severe drop in enrollment at most Indiana private colleges, a 1933 amendment to the IIC constitution made the freshman exception automatic for any member with fewer than 350 male students. Meanwhile, the probationary period for transfers increased from one year to two before being reduced again to one; an exception to the policy was made for graduates of junior colleges, who were eligible to transfer and not sit out at all. The traditional limit of five years to use four years of eligibility (including the freshman year) was eliminated in 1933, to avoid penalizing students who had to drop out of school to work.

== Discontent and demise ==
In the years before World War II, the original rationale for the IIC's existence gradually became irrelevant. The conference had been created to provide eligibility standards for smaller colleges appearing on the schedules of the "big three" and other Big Ten schools, especially in football, but after IIC teams met Big Ten teams on the gridiron 49 times in the years 1923–29 (including 12 games in 1925 alone), such opportunities all but disappeared by the 1930s. Notre Dame last scheduled an IIC school in football in 1924 (Wabash). Indiana and Purdue went from playing three or four IIC football opponents per year in the 1920s to one or two per year in the 1930s. Purdue last scheduled one in 1940 (Butler), and Indiana in 1943 (Wabash). Meanwhile, in basketball, Butler, DePauw, and Wabash continued to get games with the "big three," but after the 1920s the smaller IIC schools rarely did.

As early as 1929, eight of the smallest IIC schools convened to consider forming a conference of their own. In 1930 DePauw and Wabash joined the Buckeye Athletic Association, feeling (not for the last time) that they had more in common with the selective private colleges of Ohio. They did so without formally quitting the IIC, to which they returned in 1932. After briefly belonging to the Missouri Valley Conference (MVC) from 1932 to 1934, Butler was a member of the Mid-American Conference (MAC) from 1946 to 1950, both times without leaving the IIC. Such dual memberships caused their share of headaches. For example, because the MAC and the IIC had different rules regarding transfer students and freshman eligibility, during the postwar years Butler maintained different (though overlapping) rosters for its MAC and IIC games.

Reflecting on the growing dissatisfaction within the IIC, in 1933 the Indianapolis News noted that "no one will miss this conference, of course, but some conference will have to be formed to take its place." With the Great Depression followed by World War II, no one had the time or energy to devote to such a project. Finally, in the spring of 1947, eight of the smaller members formed the Hoosier College Conference (HCC). That fall, one sportswriter referred to the IIC as "a ghost ... which went through all the customary motions of dying" after the creation of the HCC. But because the HCC members, like Butler in the MVC and MAC, did not explicitly quit the IIC, initially the sports pages referred to the new conference as "formed within the Indiana Intercollegiate Conference." The IIC was also increasingly referred to as "strictly an eligibility-determining organization," a kind of state-level version of what the NCAA soon would become, in the early 1950s.

IIC standings all but disappeared from Indiana sports pages after 1946–47, but sportswriters continued to refer to in-state matchups involving IIC members as "conference" games, even if one of the teams now belonged to the HCC. Compounding the confusion, HCC schools sent teams to the IIC cross country and track meets and to the IIC golf and tennis tournaments, even though their own conference now sponsored championships in those sports. As early as the fall of 1947, one sportswriter called for the creation of another conference for the "middle class" of Indiana collegiate athletics, the schools "unable to compete with the Big Three and left out of the new Hoosier conference." It finally happened in February 1950, when the presidents of Ball State, Butler, Evansville, Indiana State, St. Joseph's, and Valparaiso authorized the creation of what became the Indiana Collegiate Conference (ICC), a league soon joined by DePauw. Aside from the "big three," the IIC had 22 postwar members, of which 16 became members of either the HCC or ICC in the years 1947–53. Those left out of both conferences lacked the numbers and cohesion to continue under the IIC banner or form a third successor conference.

While it is reasonably accurate to say that the Indiana Intercollegiate Conference ceased to exist in 1950 (upon the creation of the ICC, in the wake of the formation of the HCC), it faded away gradually and had no exact date of death. Annual "Indiana Intercollegiate" competitions continued in golf and tennis, while in track, the "Big State" meet resumed in 1951 and was held every year through 1975, with Indiana, Purdue, and Notre Dame taking turns hosting, and winning, an event that remained open to participants from the state's smaller colleges. The "Little State" meet continues to exist to the present, crowning Indiana state champions from among a hodgepodge of NCAA Division II, Division III, and NAIA participants. The similarity of names and acronyms between the post-1950 Indiana Collegiate Conference (ICC) and the defunct Indiana Intercollegiate Conference (IIC) also caused a degree of confusion that was reflected in many Indiana newspapers, whose sportswriters who took years to adjust to the change.

== Membership timeline ==
member (all sports) member (not in team sports)

== Conference champions ==
During the timeframe in which the IIC existed, few conferences (even at the highest level) had completely coherent approaches to scheduling. Most, however, did have guidelines, whereas the IIC had none. In each of the team sports, each member was free to put together its own schedule, for conference as well as non-conference games. The sports pages often referred to the IIC football and basketball titles listed below as "mythical championships," because they were decided by winning percentage among teams that, in some cases, had played dramatically different numbers of league contests. Especially in basketball, some of the better teams often could not agree on when, where, or whether to play. To deal with the challenge of determining a champion, in 1927 the IIC considered adding a postseason conference basketball tournament, but nothing came of it. Thus, the only definitive champions were crowned in track and in the other sports with a season-ending conference meet or tournament—tennis, golf, and cross country.

	Football champion(s)		Basketball champion(s)		Track ("Big State")	Track ("Little State")
1922	(no champion)	1922–23	Franklin	1923	Notre Dame	Butler
1923	Notre Dame	1923–24	Franklin	1924	Notre Dame	Butler
1924	Notre Dame	1924–25	Wabash	1925	Notre Dame	DePauw
1925	(four unbeaten teams)	1925–26	Butler, Manchester	1926	Notre Dame	DePauw
1926	Wabash	1926–27	Butler	1927	Indiana	DePauw
1927	Butler	1927–28	Butler	1928	Notre Dame	DePauw
1928	DePauw, Butler	1928–29	Butler	1929	Indiana	DePauw
1929	Butler	1929–30	Central Normal	1930	Notre Dame	DePauw
1930	DePauw	1930–31	Butler	1931	Notre Dame	Butler
1931	Valparaiso, DePauw	1931–32		1932	Indiana	DePauw
1932	Valparaiso, Manchester	1932–33	Earlham	1933	Indiana	DePauw
1933	DePauw	1933–34	Indiana Central	1934	Indiana	Butler
1934	Butler	1934–35	Wabash	1935	Notre Dame	Butler
1935	Butler	1935–36	Central Normal	1936	Notre Dame	DePauw
1936	Butler	1936–37	Central Normal	1937	Indiana	Butler
1937	Butler	1937–38	Valparaiso	1938	Notre Dame	Butler
1938	Butler	1938–39	Butler	1939	Indiana	Butler
1939	Butler	1939–40	Butler	1940	Notre Dame	Butler
1940	Butler, Manchester	1940–41	Indiana Central, Evansville, Butler	1941	Notre Dame	Butler
1941	St. Joseph's, Rose Poly	1941–42	Indiana Central, Evansville	1942	Notre Dame	Butler
1942	St. Joseph's, Ball State	1942–43	Wabash	1943	(no meet)	(no meet)
1943	(no champion)	1943–44	DePauw	1944	(no meet)	(no meet)
1944	(no champion)	1944–45	DePauw	1945	Notre Dame	DePauw
1945	Valparaiso	1945–46	DePauw	1946	Indiana, Purdue	Butler
1946	Butler	1946–47	DePauw	1947	Indiana	Butler
1947	Butler	1947–48	Indiana State	1948	Notre Dame	Butler
1948	Ball State	1948–49	Indiana State	1949	Notre Dame	Ball State
1949	Ball State	1949–50	Indiana State	1950	Indiana+	Ball State

+ a tri-meet of Indiana, Purdue, and Notre Dame was held instead of the 1950 "Big State"

== Football standings ==
NOTE: the conference champions and co-champions indicated in the standings below reflect the consensus of sportswriters in the year in question, and/or titles claimed by the institutions in their own athletics records.

1923 Indiana Intercollegiate Conference football standings
	Conf.					Overall
Team	W		L		T	W		L		T
Notre Dame $	1	–	0	–	0	9	–	1	–	0
Butler	4	–	1	–	0	7	–	2	–	0
Rose Poly	4	–	2	–	0	4	–	4	–	0
Franklin	3	–	2	–	1	5	–	2	–	1
Wabash	2	–	1	–	1	4	–	3	–	2
Evansville	2	–	1	–	0	3	–	2	–	0
DePauw	2	–	2	–	1	4	–	2	–	1
Indiana State	2	–	2	–	0	2	–	3	–	0
Hanover	2	–	4	–	1	2	–	6	–	1
Earlham	1	–	3	–	0	2	–	5	–	0
Central Normal	1	–	3	–	0	2	–	6	–	0
Oakland City	1	–	4	–	0	1	–	5	–	0
$ – Conference champion

1924 Indiana Intercollegiate Conference football standings
	Conf.					Overall
Team	W		L		T	W		L		T
Notre Dame $	1	–	0	–	0	10	–	0	–	0
Butler	4	–	0	–	0	4	–	5	–	0
Indiana State	4	–	1	–	0	5	–	2	–	0
Franklin	4	–	2	–	0	5	–	3	–	0
Earlham	4	–	2	–	0	5	–	3	–	0
Oakland City	4	–	2	–	0	4	–	2	–	0
Wabash	3	–	2	–	0	5	–	4	–	0
Indiana Central	3	–	2	–	0	4	–	2	–	0
Evansville	2	–	3	–	0	3	–	4	–	0
Rose Poly	2	–	3	–	0	3	–	6	–	0
Hanover	3	–	4	–	0	4	–	4	–	0
DePauw	1	–	3	–	0	2	–	6	–	0
Ball State	1	–	3	–	0	1	–	3	–	0
Manchester	0	–	1	–	0	0	–	1	–	0
Vincennes	0	–	2	–	0	0	–	2	–	0
Central Normal	0	–	6	–	0	1	–	6	–	0
$ – Conference champion

1925 Indiana Intercollegiate Conference football standings
	Conf.					Overall
Team	W		L		T	W		L		T
Central Normal +	5	–	0	–	0	6	–	0	–	0
Evansville +	3	–	0	–	0	5	–	2	–	0
Butler +	3	–	0	–	2	5	–	2	–	2
Wabash +	3	–	0	–	1	5	–	3	–	1
Earlham	5	–	1	–	0	7	–	1	–	0
Franklin	4	–	2	–	0	4	–	4	–	0
Indiana State	2	–	2	–	0	2	–	4	–	1
DePauw	2	–	2	–	1	2	–	6	–	1
Indiana Central	3	–	4	–	0	3	–	4	–	0
Rose Poly	1	–	3	–	0	1	–	7	–	0
Hanover	1	–	4	–	0	2	–	6	–	0
Ball State	1	–	5	–	0	2	–	5	–	0
Manchester	0	–	3	–	0	0	–	4	–	0
Vincennes	0	–	3	–	0	0	–	4	–	0
Oakland City	0	–	4	–	0	0	–	5	–	0
+ – Conference co-champions

1926 Indiana Intercollegiate Conference football standings
	Conf.					Overall
Team	W		L		T	W		L		T
Wabash $	5	–	0	–	0	5	–	4	–	0
Central Normal	6	–	1	–	1	6	–	1	–	1
Ball State	5	–	1	–	1	5	–	1	–	1
DePauw	4	–	1	–	1	4	–	2	–	2
Franklin	4	–	1	–	1	4	–	3	–	1
Butler	3	–	2	–	0	3	–	6	–	0
Hanover	4	–	3	–	1	4	–	3	–	1
Indiana State	1	–	2	–	0	2	–	4	–	1
Earlham	2	–	5	–	0	3	–	5	–	0
Indiana Central	2	–	5	–	1	2	–	5	–	1
Manchester	1	–	3	–	0	1	–	5	–	0
Evansville	1	–	4	–	0	2	–	6	–	0
Rose Poly	1	–	4	–	0	1	–	7	–	0
Oakland City	0	–	3	–	3	1	–	3	–	3
Vincennes	0	–	4	–	1	0	–	6	–	1
$ – Conference champion

1927 Indiana Intercollegiate Conference football standings
	Conf.					Overall
Team	W		L		T	W		L		T
Butler $	4	–	0	–	1	4	–	3	–	1
Manchester	2	–	0	–	1	3	–	2	–	1
Wabash	3	–	1	–	0	7	–	2	–	0
Central Normal	6	–	2	–	0	6	–	2	–	0
DePauw	4	–	2	–	0	4	–	4	–	0
Ball State	3	–	2	–	1	5	–	2	–	1
Evansville	3	–	2	–	0	3	–	5	–	0
Indiana State	2	–	2	–	1	4	–	2	–	1
Earlham	2	–	2	–	1	3	–	2	–	2
Franklin	2	–	2	–	2	2	–	3	–	2
Indiana Central	2	–	3	–	2	2	–	3	–	2
Oakland City	1	–	4	–	1	1	–	4	–	1
Hanover	1	–	4	–	1	1	–	6	–	1
Rose Poly	1	–	5	–	1	1	–	6	–	1
Valparaiso	0	–	1	–	0	1	–	5	–	0
Vincennes	0	–	4	–	0	0	–	4	–	0
$ – Conference champion

1928 Indiana Intercollegiate Conference football standings
	Conf.					Overall
Team	W		L		T	W		L		T
DePauw +	6	–	0	–	0	6	–	2	–	0
Butler +	4	–	0	–	0	6	–	2	–	0
Indiana State	4	–	1	–	0	4	–	3	–	0
Indiana Central	5	–	2	–	1	5	–	2	–	1
Wabash	2	–	1	–	0	4	–	4	–	1
Earlham	4	–	3	–	0	5	–	3	–	0
Central Normal	4	–	3	–	0	4	–	3	–	0
Ball State	2	–	2	–	2	3	–	2	–	2
Manchester	2	–	2	–	0	4	–	2	–	1
Oakland City	3	–	4	–	0	3	–	4	–	0
Hanover	2	–	3	–	0	3	–	4	–	0
Franklin (IN)	1	–	6	–	1	1	–	6	–	1
Valparaiso	0	–	2	–	0	1	–	6	–	0
Rose Poly	0	–	5	–	0	0	–	6	–	0
Evansville	0	–	5	–	0	0	–	7	–	0
+ – Conference co-champions

1929 Indiana Intercollegiate Conference football standings
	Conf.					Overall
Team	W		L		T	W		L		T
Butler $	2	–	0	–	0	4	–	4	–	0
Indiana State	5	–	0	–	1	5	–	2	–	1
Central Normal	6	–	1	–	0	6	–	2	–	0
Franklin (IN)	5	–	2	–	1	5	–	2	–	1
Manchester	3	–	2	–	0	5	–	2	–	0
Earlham	3	–	2	–	1	3	–	4	–	1
Rose Poly	4	–	4	–	0	4	–	4	–	0
Indiana Central	4	–	4	–	0	4	–	4	–	0
DePauw	3	–	3	–	0	4	–	4	–	0
Wabash	2	–	2	–	0	4	–	5	–	0
Hanover	1	–	1	–	1	2	–	3	–	1
Evansville	1	–	5	–	0	1	–	7	–	0
Valparaiso	0	–	3	–	0	1	–	7	–	0
Ball State	0	–	4	–	0	0	–	8	–	0
Oakland City	0	–	6	–	0	0	–	7	–	0
$ – Conference champion

1930 Indiana Intercollegiate Conference football standings
	Conf.					Overall
Team	W		L		T	W		L		T
DePauw $	5	–	0	–	0	6	–	1	–	0
Butler	2	–	0	–	0	2	–	7	–	0
Rose Poly	7	–	1	–	0	7	–	1	–	0
Ball State	6	–	1	–	0	6	–	1	–	0
Manchester	5	–	1	–	0	6	–	2	–	0
Indiana State	5	–	1	–	1	5	–	3	–	1
Evansville	3	–	1	–	1	3	–	3	–	1
Franklin (IN)	3	–	4	–	1	3	–	4	–	1
Wabash	2	–	5	–	0	3	–	6	–	0
Valparaiso	1	–	3	–	0	5	–	4	–	0
Indiana Central	2	–	7	–	0	2	–	7	–	0
Oakland City	1	–	5	–	1	1	–	5	–	1
Hanover	0	–	2	–	2	1	–	4	–	2
Earlham	0	–	5	–	1	1	–	5	–	1
Central Normal	0	–	6	–	1	0	–	6	–	1
$ – Conference champion

1931 Indiana Intercollegiate Conference football standings
	Conf.					Overall
Team	W		L		T	W		L		T
Valparaiso +	4	–	0	–	0	8	–	1	–	0
DePauw +	4	–	0	–	0	7	–	1	–	0
Franklin (IN)	7	–	1	–	0	7	–	1	–	0
Rose Poly	5	–	2	–	0	6	–	2	–	0
Manchester	2	–	1	–	0	4	–	4	–	0
Butler	2	–	1	–	0	3	–	5	–	0
Indiana State	3	–	2	–	0	4	–	3	–	0
Evansville	3	–	3	–	0	3	–	5	–	0
Wabash	3	–	3	–	0	3	–	5	–	1
Oakland City	2	–	3	–	0	3	–	3	–	0
Central Normal	2	–	4	–	0	2	–	4	–	0
Earlham	2	–	4	–	0	2	–	5	–	0
Ball State	2	–	5	–	0	2	–	6	–	0
Hanover	0	–	6	–	1	1	–	7	–	1
Indiana Central	0	–	6	–	1	0	–	6	–	1
+ – Conference co-champions

1932 Indiana Intercollegiate Conference football standings
	Conf.					Overall
Team	W		L		T	W		L		T
Manchester +	4	–	0	–	0	6	–	1	–	0
Valparaiso +	3	–	0	–	0	7	–	0	–	0
Wabash	4	–	0	–	2	4	–	2	–	2
DePauw	3	–	1	–	1	3	–	4	–	1
Butler	2	–	1	–	0	2	–	4	–	1
Franklin (IN)	4	–	2	–	1	4	–	3	–	1
Hanover	3	–	2	–	1	4	–	3	–	1
Rose Poly	3	–	3	–	0	5	–	3	–	0
Ball State	4	–	4	–	0	4	–	4	–	0
Evansville	2	–	2	–	1	2	–	4	–	1
Indiana State	3	–	4	–	0	3	–	5	–	0
Central Normal	1	–	6	–	0	1	–	7	–	0
Earlham	0	–	5	–	0	1	–	5	–	0
Oakland City	0	–	6	–	0	1	–	6	–	0
+ – Conference co-champions

1933 Indiana Intercollegiate Conference football standings
	Conf.					Overall
Team	W		L		T	W		L		T
DePauw $	7	–	0	–	0	7	–	0	–	0
Valparaiso	3	–	0	–	0	7	–	1	–	0
Indiana State	6	–	1	–	0	7	–	1	–	0
Hanover	5	–	1	–	0	6	–	2	–	0
Wabash	4	–	2	–	1	4	–	2	–	1
Central Normal	3	–	2	–	0	4	–	2	–	1
Oakland City	3	–	2	–	0	3	–	3	–	0
Butler	2	–	3	–	0	2	–	6	–	0
Gary	1	–	2	–	0	2	–	3	–	0
Evansville	2	–	4	–	1	2	–	5	–	1
Franklin (IN)	2	–	4	–	1	2	–	5	–	1
Earlham	1	–	3	–	0	3	–	3	–	0
Manchester	1	–	3	–	0	1	–	5	–	1
Ball State	1	–	6	–	1	1	–	6	–	1
Rose Poly	0	–	8	–	0	0	–	8	–	0
$ – Conference champion

1934 Indiana Intercollegiate Conference football standings
	Conf.					Overall
Team	W		L		T	W		L		T
Butler $	6	–	0	–	1	6	–	1	–	1
DePauw	6	–	1	–	0	7	–	1	–	0
Hanover	4	–	1	–	0	7	–	2	–	0
Valparaiso	4	–	1	–	0	6	–	2	–	0
Wabash	4	–	1	–	2	4	–	2	–	2
Earlham	2	–	2	–	0	3	–	4	–	0
Indiana State	3	–	3	–	0	3	–	5	–	0
Evansville	3	–	4	–	1	3	–	4	–	1
Franklin (IN)	3	–	5	–	0	3	–	5	–	0
Manchester	1	–	2	–	0	6	–	2	–	0
Ball State	2	–	6	–	0	2	–	6	–	0
Central Normal	1	–	4	–	0	2	–	5	–	0
Rose Poly	1	–	5	–	0	2	–	6	–	0
Oakland City	0	–	5	–	0	0	–	7	–	0
$ – Conference champion

1935 Indiana Intercollegiate Conference football standings
	Conf.					Overall
Team	W		L		T	W		L		T
Butler $	6	–	0	–	0	7	–	1	–	0
DePauw	5	–	0	–	2	5	–	1	–	2
Wabash	6	–	1	–	1	6	–	1	–	1
Indiana State	4	–	1	–	0	5	–	3	–	0
Manchester	3	–	1	–	2	4	–	1	–	2
Central Normal	2	–	1	–	2	3	–	1	–	3
Valparaiso	2	–	2	–	0	4	–	4	–	1
Ball State	3	–	4	–	1	3	–	4	–	1
Evansville	4	–	5	–	0	4	–	5	–	0
Hanover	2	–	3	–	0	2	–	5	–	1
Earlham	1	–	2	–	1	0	–	0	–	0
Saint Joseph's (IN)	1	–	3	–	0	1	–	4	–	0
Rose Poly	1	–	5	–	0	2	–	5	–	0
Franklin (IN)	1	–	7	–	0	1	–	7	–	0
Oakland City	0	–	6	–	1	0	–	7	–	1
$ – Conference champion

1936 Indiana Intercollegiate Conference football standings
	Conf.					Overall
Team	W		L		T	W		L		T
Butler $	5	–	0	–	0	6	–	0	–	2
Indiana State	2	–	0	–	1	2	–	3	–	2
Wabash	6	–	1	–	0	7	–	1	–	0
Saint Joseph's (IN)	3	–	1	–	1	3	–	1	–	1
Central Normal	4	–	2	–	0	4	–	3	–	0
DePauw	3	–	2	–	2	3	–	3	–	2
Manchester	5	–	3	–	0	5	–	3	–	0
Ball State	3	–	3	–	1	3	–	4	–	1
Franklin (IN)	3	–	4	–	0	3	–	5	–	0
Evansville	2	–	3	–	2	3	–	3	–	2
Valparaiso	1	–	3	–	1	1	–	6	–	1
Hanover	1	–	3	–	0	1	–	6	–	0
Earlham	1	–	4	–	0	2	–	4	–	1
Rose Poly	1	–	5	–	0	2	–	5	–	0
Oakland City	0	–	6	–	0	0	–	8	–	0
$ – Conference champion

1937 Indiana Intercollegiate Conference football standings
	Conf.					Overall
Team	W		L		T	W		L		T
Butler $	3	–	0	–	1	5	–	2	–	1
DePauw	7	–	1	–	0	7	–	1	–	0
Saint Joseph's (IN)	4	–	1	–	0	4	–	2	–	1
Ball State	5	–	1	–	1	5	–	2	–	1
Earlham	2	–	1	–	2	4	–	1	–	2
Hanover	4	–	2	–	0	5	–	3	–	0
Valparaiso	4	–	2	–	0	4	–	4	–	0
Wabash	3	–	2	–	2	3	–	3	–	2
Franklin (IN)	3	–	3	–	1	3	–	4	–	1
Rose Poly	2	–	4	–	0	4	–	4	–	0
Manchester	1	–	3	–	0	4	–	3	–	0
Indiana State	1	–	4	–	0	1	–	7	–	0
Central Normal	1	–	4	–	1	1	–	5	–	1
Oakland City	0	–	5	–	0	0	–	7	–	0
Evansville	0	–	7	–	0	0	–	9	–	0
$ – Conference champion

1938 Indiana Intercollegiate Conference football standings
	Conf.					Overall
Team	W		L		T	W		L		T
Butler $	3	–	0	–	0	4	–	4	–	0
Manchester	6	–	1	–	0	7	–	1	–	0
Ball State	6	–	1	–	1	6	–	1	–	1
Hanover	4	–	2	–	0	5	–	2	–	0
DePauw	4	–	2	–	0	5	–	3	–	0
Rose Poly	2	–	1	–	0	5	–	3	–	0
Evansville	4	–	3	–	1	4	–	4	–	1
Valparaiso	2	–	2	–	1	2	–	4	–	1
Saint Joseph's (IN)	1	–	2	–	1	2	–	4	–	1
Franklin (IN)	2	–	5	–	0	2	–	6	–	0
Indiana State	1	–	4	–	0	1	–	7	–	0
Earlham	1	–	5	–	1	1	–	6	–	1
Wabash	1	–	5	–	1	1	–	6	–	1
Central Normal	0	–	4	–	0	0	–	7	–	0
$ – Conference champion

1939 Indiana Intercollegiate Conference football standings
	Conf.					Overall
Team	W		L		T	W		L		T
Butler $	4	–	0	–	0	7	–	0	–	1
Ball State	5	–	1	–	0	6	–	2	–	0
Manchester	4	–	1	–	0	7	–	1	–	0
Rose Poly	3	–	1	–	1	5	–	3	–	1
Earlham	5	–	2	–	0	5	–	2	–	0
Saint Joseph's (IN)	2	–	1	–	0	4	–	3	–	0
DePauw	3	–	2	–	1	4	–	3	–	1
Hanover	3	–	3	–	0	4	–	4	–	0
Wabash	2	–	3	–	1	3	–	5	–	1
Central Normal	1	–	3	–	0	2	–	4	–	0
Valparaiso	1	–	3	–	0	2	–	6	–	0
Franklin (IN)	1	–	7	–	0	1	–	7	–	0
Evansville	0	–	4	–	1	1	–	6	–	1
Indiana State	0	–	3	–	0	2	–	6	–	0
$ – Conference champion

1940 Indiana Intercollegiate Conference football standings
	Conf.					Overall
Team	W		L		T	W		L		T
Manchester +	4	–	0	–	0	5	–	2	–	1
Butler +	4	–	0	–	0	4	–	4	–	1
Evansville	4	–	1	–	0	5	–	3	–	0
Rose Poly	4	–	1	–	0	5	–	3	–	0
Saint Joseph's (IN)	3	–	1	–	0	4	–	2	–	1
Indiana State	2	–	1	–	0	5	–	2	–	1
Wabash	4	–	2	–	0	4	–	4	–	1
DePauw	3	–	3	–	0	3	–	4	–	0
Ball State	2	–	3	–	0	3	–	4	–	1
Valparaiso	2	–	3	–	0	3	–	4	–	1
Hanover	1	–	4	–	0	1	–	8	–	0
Earlham	1	–	4	–	1	1	–	5	–	1
Central Normal	0	–	4	–	1	0	–	5	–	1
Franklin (IN)	0	–	7	–	0	0	–	8	–	0
+ – Conference co-champions

1941 Indiana Intercollegiate Conference football standings
	Conf.					Overall
Team	W		L		T	W		L		T
Rose Poly +	4	–	0	–	0	7	–	0	–	0
Saint Joseph's (IN) +	3	–	0	–	0	8	–	0	–	1
Ball State	3	–	1	–	1	3	–	2	–	2
Butler	3	–	1	–	0	5	–	4	–	0
Wabash	4	–	2	–	0	5	–	3	–	1
DePauw	3	–	2	–	0	6	–	2	–	0
Indiana State	2	–	1	–	1	5	–	2	–	1
Evansville	2	–	1	–	1	3	–	5	–	1
Manchester	2	–	1	–	1	2	–	2	–	2
Franklin (IN)	2	–	4	–	1	2	–	5	–	1
Hanover	1	–	3	–	0	1	–	7	–	0
Central Normal	1	–	4	–	0	2	–	5	–	0
Earlham	0	–	5	–	0	2	–	5	–	0
Valparaiso	0	–	5	–	0	0	–	8	–	0
+ – Conference co-champions

1942 Indiana Intercollegiate Conference football standings
	Conf.					Overall
Team	W		L		T	W		L		T
Ball State +	5	–	0	–	0	6	–	2	–	0
Saint Joseph's (IN) +	3	–	0	–	0	7	–	0	–	1
Rose Poly	4	–	1	–	0	5	–	1	–	0
Wabash	4	–	1	–	0	4	–	2	–	1
DePauw	3	–	1	–	0	5	–	3	–	0
Valparaiso	3	–	2	–	0	4	–	4	–	0
Manchester	2	–	2	–	0	4	–	4	–	0
Hanover	2	–	3	–	0	2	–	5	–	0
Butler	1	–	2	–	0	2	–	7	–	0
Indiana State	1	–	3	–	0	4	–	3	–	0
Evansville	1	–	3	–	0	1	–	4	–	0
Franklin (IN)	1	–	5	–	0	1	–	7	–	0
Central Normal	0	–	3	–	0	0	–	4	–	0
Earlham	0	–	4	–	0	1	–	6	–	0
+ – Conference co-champions

1945 Indiana Intercollegiate Conference football standings
	Conf.					Overall
Team	W		L		T	W		L		T
Valparaiso $	4	–	0	–	0	6	–	1	–	0
DePauw	1	–	0	–	0	3	–	2	–	0
Ball State	4	–	1	–	1	4	–	1	–	1
Butler	3	–	2	–	0	3	–	3	–	0
Earlham	3	–	3	–	0	3	–	3	–	0
Wabash	1	–	1	–	1	2	–	3	–	1
Central Normal	2	–	3	–	0	2	–	4	–	0
Indiana State	1	–	2	–	0	2	–	4	–	0
Manchester	0	–	2	–	0	0	–	2	–	0
Franklin (IN)	0	–	5	–	0	0	–	5	–	0
$ – Conference champion

1946 Indiana Intercollegiate Conference football standings
	Conf.					Overall
Team	W		L		T	W		L		T
Butler $	6	–	0	–	0	7	–	1	–	0
Evansville	2	–	0	–	0	7	–	1	–	2
Wabash	5	–	1	–	0	7	–	1	–	0
Earlham	4	–	2	–	0	5	–	3	–	0
Saint Joseph's (IN)	2	–	1	–	0	3	–	4	–	0
Hanover	3	–	2	–	0	4	–	3	–	0
Franklin (IN)	3	–	3	–	0	4	–	4	–	0
Ball State	3	–	3	–	0	3	–	4	–	1
Indiana Central	3	–	4	–	0	3	–	4	–	0
Indiana State	2	–	4	–	0	4	–	4	–	0
Manchester	2	–	4	–	0	3	–	5	–	0
DePauw	1	–	2	–	0	1	–	5	–	2
Canterbury	1	–	4	–	0	1	–	7	–	0
Rose Poly	1	–	5	–	0	1	–	7	–	1
Valparaiso	0	–	3	–	0	1	–	7	–	0
$ – Conference champion
