= Blue Key Victory Bell =

American college football rivalry

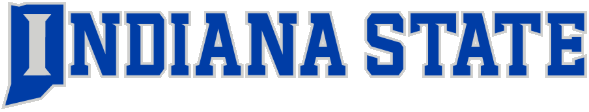
- Indiana State Sycamores Ball State Cardinals
- Sport: Football
- First meeting: October 18, 1924; Indiana State, 47–0
- Latest meeting: September 16, 2023; Ball State, 45–7
- Next meeting: September 9, 2028
- Trophy: Victory Bell

Statistics
- Total meetings: 66
- All-time series: Ball State leads, 39–24–1
- Largest victory: Indiana State, 47–0 (1924)
- Longest win streak: Ball State, 6 (1988–2003)
- Current win streak: Ball State, 1 (2023–present)

Locations of Ball State and Indiana State

The Blue Key Victory Bell is presented to the winner of the college football game between Indiana State University and Ball State University. The two schools met regularly between 1924 and 1991 but sporadically since that season. The two have competed for the Victory Bell since 1940; they were conference rivals from 1924 to 1947 in the Indiana Intercollegiate Conference and again from 1951 to 1967 in the Indiana Collegiate Conference. Ball State was a regional campus of Indiana State University from 1918 to 1961; since the 1961–62 academic year, Ball State has operated independently.

== History ==
Early in the series, games would be played either at Terre Haute, Indiana (hosted by Indiana State) or Muncie, Indiana (hosted by Ball State). The first two games between the schools took place at Terre Haute in 1924 and 1925; then the series between the schools continued on a near home-and-home basis from 1931 to 1983. From 1984 to 1989, the games were played at a neutral site, Hoosier Dome in Indianapolis; during this era, Indiana State moved down to Division I-AA (now Division I FCS) while Ball State remained Division I-A (now Division I FBS). The last home-and-home cycle for this game was in 1990 and 1991. Since 2002, all games in this series have been played in Muncie. The Victory Bell continues to be the official game trophy, even though the Indiana State / ball state series has become less frequent since the 1990s.

In 1940, the Blue Key chapters at both Indiana State and Ball State agreed to donate a bell to the winner of the football game between their two schools.

On September 13, 2014, Indiana State beat Ball State for their first win over Ball State since 1987. The most recent game in the series occurred on September 16, 2023, in which Ball State defeated Indiana State by a score of 45–7.

== Game results ==
Ball State victories	Indiana State victories	Tie games

No.	Date	Location	Winner	Score
1	October 18, 1924	Terre Haute	Indiana State	47–0
2	November 6, 1925	Terre Haute	Indiana State	20–7
3	November 6, 1931	Terre Haute	Indiana State	13–7
4	November 12, 1932	Muncie	Ball State	12–0
5	November 4, 1933	Terre Haute	Indiana State	9–6
6	November 10, 1934	Muncie	Ball State	15–6
7	November 2, 1935	Terre Haute	Indiana State	12–6
8	October 17, 1936	Muncie	Indiana State	3–0
9	November 6, 1937	Terre Haute	Ball State	7–0
10	October 8, 1938	Muncie	Ball State	13–9
11	October 21, 1939	Terre Haute	Ball State	28–7
12	November 16, 1940	Muncie	Indiana State	27–7
13	November 15, 1941	Terre Haute	Ball State	7–0
14	November 14, 1942	Muncie	Ball State	7–0
15	November 16, 1946	Terre Haute	Indiana State	3–0
16	November 15, 1947	Muncie	Ball State	14–10
17	November 13, 1948	Terre Haute	Ball State	10–7
18	November 12, 1949	Muncie	Ball State	34–6
19	November 11, 1950	Muncie	Ball State	32–0
20	October 20, 1951	Muncie	Tie	0–0
21	October 18, 1952	Terre Haute	Ball State	33–0
22	October 17, 1953	Muncie	Ball State	33–6
23	October 16, 1954	Terre Haute	Indiana State	14–13
24	October 15, 1955	Muncie	Ball State	19–6
25	October 20, 1956	Terre Haute	Ball State	26–14
26	November 9, 1957	Terre Haute	Ball State	20–0
27	November 8, 1958	Muncie	Ball State	26–8
28	November 7, 1959	Terre Haute	Indiana State	29–8
29	November 5, 1960	Muncie	Indiana State	26–23
30	October 21, 1961	Muncie	Indiana State	4–0
31	October 20, 1962	Terre Haute	Indiana State	22–0
32	October 19, 1963	Muncie	Ball State	15–7
33	October 17, 1964	Terre Haute	Indiana State	17–0

No.	Date	Location	Winner	Score
34	October 30, 1965	Terre Haute	Ball State	52–15
35	October 29, 1966	Muncie	Ball State	31–20
36	October 28, 1967	Terre Haute	Ball State	26–24
37	November 2, 1968	Muncie	Indiana State	20–14
38	October 11, 1969	Muncie	Indiana State	26–0
39	October 10, 1970	Terre Haute	Ball State	28–26
40	October 9, 1971	Muncie	Ball State	20–17
41	October 9, 1972	Terre Haute	Ball State	21–10
42	October 6, 1973	Muncie	Ball State	18–17
43	October 5, 1974	Terre Haute	Indiana State	31–22
44	October 4, 1975	Muncie	Ball State	20–16
45	November 6, 1976	Muncie	Ball State	24–9
46	November 5, 1977	Terre Haute	Ball State	42–18
47	October 7, 1978	Muncie	Ball State	7–0
48	October 6, 1979	Terre Haute	Indiana State	18–13
49	November 22, 1980	Muncie	Ball State	28–21
50	October 10, 1981	Terre Haute	Indiana State	31–7
51	September 25, 1982	Muncie	Indiana State	17–0
52	October 8, 1983	Terre Haute	Indiana State	35–14
53	October 6, 1984	Indianapolis	Indiana State	34–6
54	November 9, 1985	Indianapolis	Ball State	29–27
55	October 4, 1986	Indianapolis	Ball State	16–3
56	November 21, 1987	Indianapolis	Indiana State	24–23
57	November 17, 1988	Indianapolis	Ball State	24–10
58	October 26, 1989	Indianapolis	Ball State	34–27
59	October 27, 1990	Muncie	Ball State	42–0
60	September 28, 1991	Terre Haute	Ball State	14–10
61	September 14, 2002	Muncie	Ball State	23–21
62	August 28, 2003	Muncie	Ball State	31–7
63	September 13, 2014	Muncie	Indiana State	27–20
64	September 16, 2023	Muncie	Ball State	45–7
Series: Ball State leads 39–24–1

== See also ==
- List of NCAA college football rivalry games
