= Canterbury College (Indiana) =

Defunct college in Indiana, United States

Coordinates: 39°54′50″N 86°48′15″W

Canterbury College was a private institution located in Danville, Indiana, United States from 1878 to 1951. The school was known as Central Normal College prior to 1946.

== History ==
The college was founded in 1876 as part of the larger statewide university system in Indiana. The school was located in Ladoga, Indiana, but was moved to Danville, Indiana in 1878 after purchasing the former Danville Academy buildings. Normal Hall is the only remaining building associated with the Central Indiana Normal School at Ladoga. It was listed on the National Register of Historic Places in 1996.

The school taught traditional college courses, but primarily focused on training teachers. Over 75,000 teachers were trained while the school was in operation. In 1942 the school buildings were taken over by the Northern Diocese of the Episcopal Church and the college was renamed Canterbury College, but it continued as a normal school until closing in 1951 due to bankruptcy.

Boosters and alumni spared no effort to save Canterbury, but to no avail. "At the height of the last-minute campaign to save the college, its president dressed in red flannels and led a parade in which United States Senator William E. Jenner rode an elephant, Governor Henry Schricker drove a span of mules, and scantily clad coeds peddled doughnuts at $1 each." When the college declared bankruptcy, it had debts approaching $90,000 (just over $1 million in 2023 dollars).

After the college closed, the old Administration Building and the Chapel were torn down, but Hargrave Hall and the C.C. Bostick Gymnasium were used as the Danville Community High School and then the Danville Community Middle School until 2009.

The building was used for Ivy Tech classes in conjunction with Danville Community High School and is referred to as Central Normal Campus. In addition to housing educational facilities, it also houses the Danville Police Department as well Danville Athletic Club.

== Notable alumni ==
The school's alumni include:

- Samuel Ralston, a United States Senator and the 28th Indiana Governor,
- U.S. Representative William Larrabee
- U.S. Representative William La Follette
- MLB pitcher Vic Aldridge,
- John Cravens, long-time university administrator
- David Myers, Justice of the Indiana Supreme Court
- Jim Springer, former professional basketball player
- George Tremain, Justice of the Indiana Supreme Court
- Lewis Terman, human development psychologist.
- William H. Stead, Illinois Attorney General, also went to the school.
- Frank W. Griese, Mayor of Evansville, Indiana (1930–1935)
- John W. Spencer, Chief Justice of the Indiana Supreme Court
- Elmer Louis Hoehn, Member of the Indiana House of Representatives
