= Earlham Quakers football =

American college football team

- First season: 1889
- Last season: 2018
- Location: Richmond, Indiana
- Colors: Maroon and white
- Website: goearlham.com

The Earlham Quakers football team represented Earlham College in the sport of college football. The NCAA Division III team first competed in 1889. They were considered the easternmost of the midwest schools. On November 13, 2018, the school announced that they would suspend the sport for the 2019 season and reevaluate the role of the program in the future. The school had lost 53 straight games at the time of the announcement.
