= Ball State Cardinals football =

College football program in Muncie, Indiana, US

2026 Ball State Cardinals football team
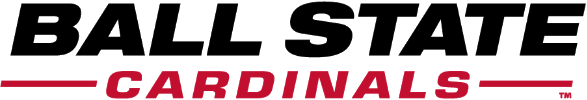
- First season: 1924; 102 years ago
- Athletic director: Jeff Mitchell
- Head coach: Mike Uremovich; 1st season, 4–8 (.333)
- Location: Muncie, Indiana
- Stadium: Scheumann Stadium (capacity: 22,500)
- NCAA division: Division I FBS
- Conference: MAC
- Colors: Cardinal and white
- All-time record: 483–473–32 (.505)
- Bowl record: 1–8 (.111)

Conference championships
- IIC: 1942 ICC: 1964, 1965, 1966, 1967 MAC: 1976, 1978, 1989, 1993, 1996, 2020

Division championships
- MAC West: 2001, 2007, 2008, 2020
- Rivalries: Indiana State (rivalry); Northern Illinois (rivalry); Miami (rivalry)

Uniforms
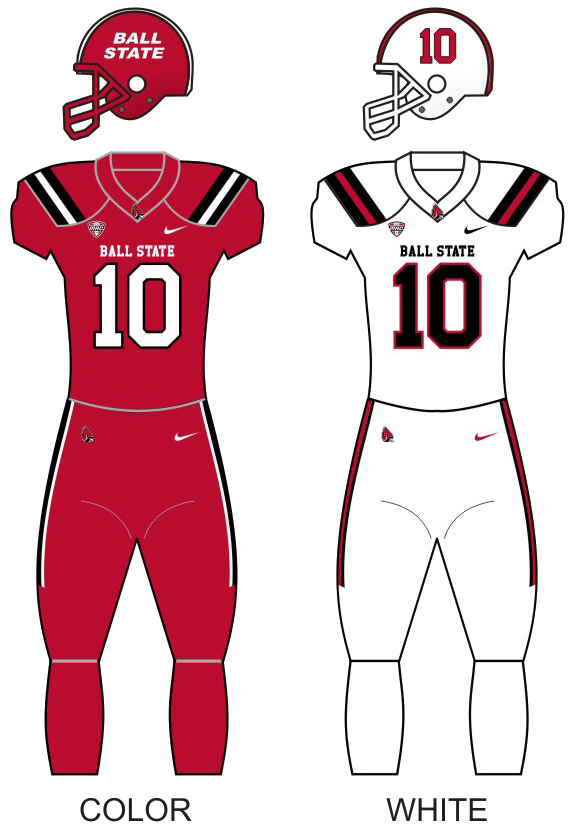
- Fight song: Ball State Fight Song
- Mascot: Charlie Cardinal
- Marching band: The Pride of Mid-America Marching Band
- Website: BallStateSports.com

The Ball State Cardinals football team is a college football program representing Ball State University in National Collegiate Athletic Association (NCAA) Division I Football Bowl Subdivision (FBS) college football. Ball State plays its home games at Scheumann Stadium on the campus of Ball State University in Muncie, Indiana. The Cardinals compete in the Mid-American Conference as a member of the West Division. The team is currently led by head coach Mike Uremovich, who was hired on December 4, 2024.

The Cardinals have a 476–455–32 record, which ranks below the top 50 most victories among NCAA FBS programs. Ball State was originally classified as a teacher's college, participating in the National Junior College Athletic Association (NJCAA) from 1937 until 1956. In 1957, they were classified as a Small College school until 1972. Ball State received Division II classification in 1973, before becoming a Division I-AA program in 1975 and a Division I-A (now FBS) program in 1981, dropping to Division I-AA for a single season (1982) before returning to Division I-A.

== Conference affiliations ==
Ball State has been an independent and affiliated with multiple conferences.

- Indiana Intercollegiate Conference (1924–1949)
- Indiana Collegiate Conference (1950–1969)
- Conference of Midwestern Universities (1970–1971)
- Mid-American Conference (1973–present)

== Championships ==
=== Conference championships (11) ===
Year	Conference	Coach	Record
1942	Indiana Intercollegiate Conference	John Magnabosco	6–2
1964	Indiana Collegiate Conference	Ray Louthen	5–3
1965	Indiana Collegiate Conference	Ray Louthen	9–0–1
1966	Indiana Collegiate Conference	Ray Louthen	7–1–1
1967	Indiana Collegiate Conference	Ray Louthen	7–3
1976	Mid-American Conference	Dave McClain	8–3
1978	Mid-American Conference	Dwight Wallace	10–1
1989	Mid-American Conference	Paul Schudel	7–3–2
1993	Mid-American Conference	Paul Schudel	8–3–1
1996	Mid-American Conference	Bill Lynch	8–4
2020	Mid-American Conference	Mike Neu	6–1

=== Division championships (4) ===
Year	Division	Coach	Opponent	CG result
2001	MAC West	Bill Lynch	N/A lost tiebreaker to Toledo	
2007	MAC West	Brady Hoke	N/A lost tiebreaker to Central Michigan	
2008	MAC West	Brady Hoke	Buffalo	L 24–42
2020	MAC West	Mike Neu	Buffalo	W 38–28

== Bowl games (9) ==
Ball State has appeared in nine NCAA Division I postseason bowl games, in which they have compiled a 1–8 record. Within all FBS teams, Ball State was one of eight that had never won a sanctioned bowl game, until the 2020 Arizona Bowl.

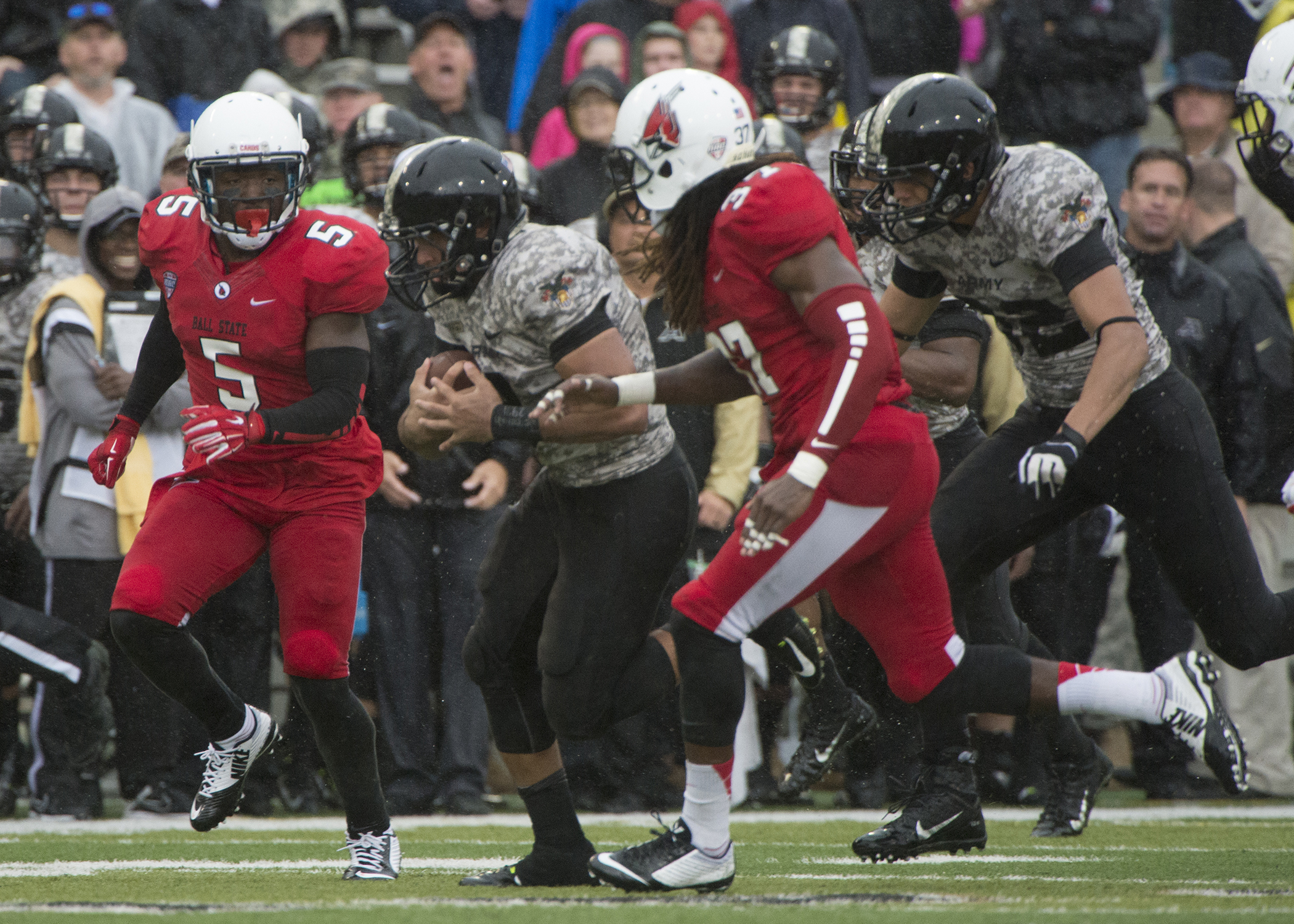
Ball State v Army game in 2014

Season	Date	Bowl	Opponent	Result
1989	December 9, 1989	California Bowl	Fresno State	L 6–27
1993	December 17, 1993	Las Vegas Bowl	Utah State	L 33–42
1996	December 18, 1996	Las Vegas Bowl	Nevada	L 15–18
2007	January 5, 2008	International Bowl	Rutgers	L 30–52
2008	January 6, 2009	GMAC Bowl	Tulsa	L 13–45
2012	December 21, 2012	Beef 'O' Brady's Bowl	UCF	L 17–38
2013	January 5, 2014	GoDaddy Bowl	Arkansas State	L 20–23
2020	December 31, 2020	Arizona Bowl	San Jose State	W 34–13
2021	December 25, 2021	Camellia Bowl	Georgia State	L 20–51

Ball State also appeared in two NCAA College Division postseason bowl games, where they compiled a record of 0–1–1.

Season	Date	Bowl	Opponent	Result
1965	December 11, 1965	Grantland Rice Bowl	Tennessee State	T 14–14
1967	December 9, 1967	Grantland Rice Bowl	Eastern Kentucky	L 13–27

== Head coaches ==
The Ball State Cardinals have had 17 head coaches throughout the program's history. With 68 victories, John Magnabosco has the most victories in the program's history, followed by Paul Schudel (60 wins) and Dave McClain (46).

== Rivalries ==
=== Indiana State ===
Ball State leads the series with Indiana State 39–24–1 with the last game played in 2023.

=== Miami (OH) ===
Ball State first played the Miami RedHawks football team in 1931. Their rivalry began when Ball State joined the Mid-American Conference in the 1970s. Since 2017, the rivalry has been a protected cross-division game in the conference, with the Cardinals competing for the Red Bird Rivalry trophy against Miami. Through 2025, Miami leads the all-time series 25–13–1.

=== Northern Illinois ===
The Cardinals have played Northern Illinois six times in football since the launch of the Bronze Stalk Trophy. The trophy depicts several cornstalks in tribute to the prevalence of maize around the respective home states of the rivals. Northern Illinois holds a 26–25–2 lead in the series through the 2026 season.

== Cardinals in professional football ==
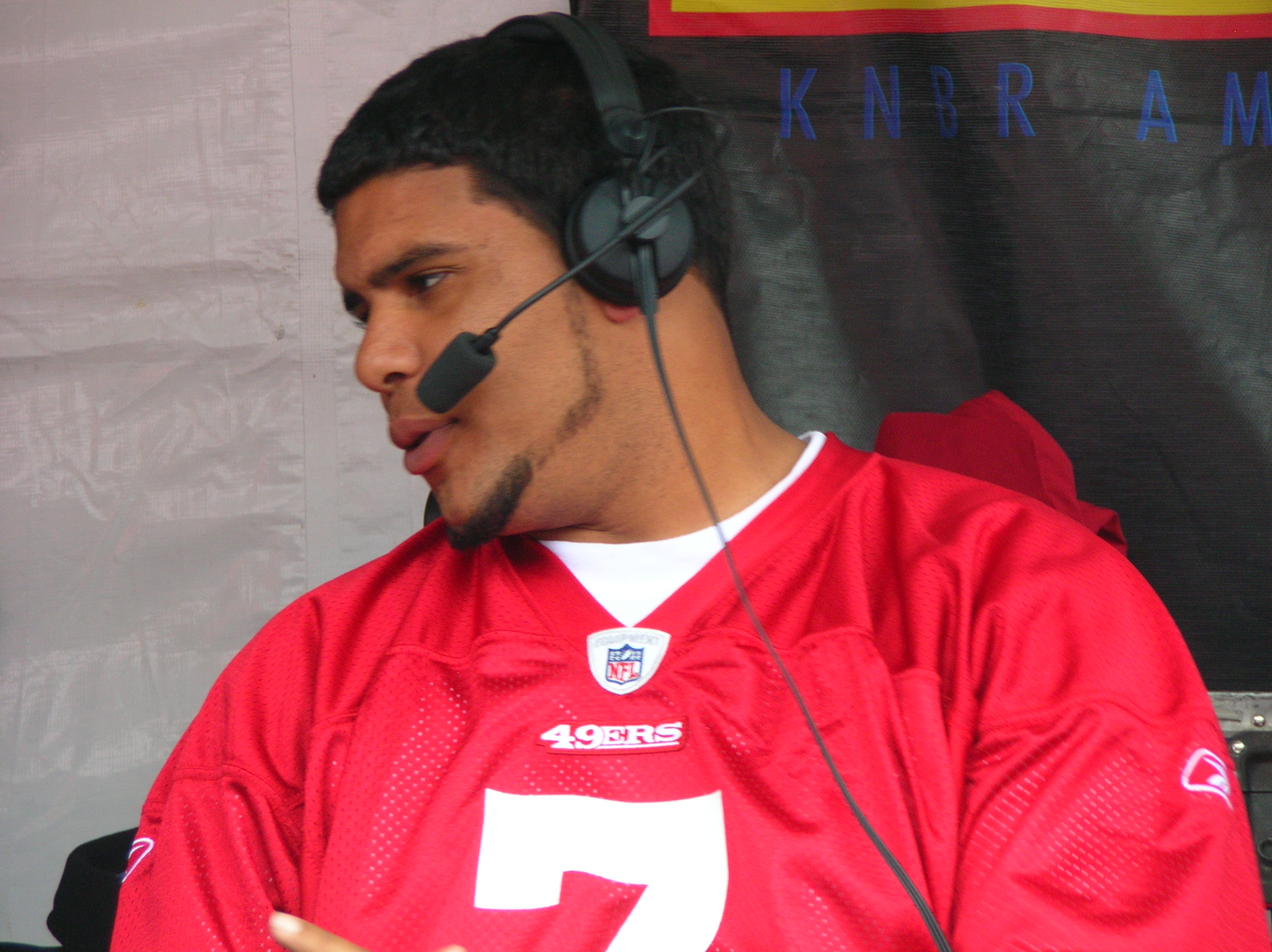
Quarterback Nate Davis

Ball State has produced a total of 29 NFL draft selections. The following "Active" and "All-Star" lists account for past and present Ball State University football players that have participated in the National Football League, Canadian Football League, Arena Football League, XFL, United States Football League, European Football League, Austrian Football League, German Football League and IFL.

=== Active ===
As of February 2023, there are a total of thirteen Cardinals listed on team rosters in the NFL, CFL, AFL, XFL, IFL, and USFL.

- Christian Albright - DL - Saskatchewan Roughriders
- Nate Davis - QB - Duke City Gladiators
- Walter Fletcher - RB - Montreal Alouettes
- Justin Hall - WR - Houston Gamblers
- Caleb Huntley - RB - Atlanta Falcons
- Hassan Littles - WR - Green Bay Blizzard
- Jonathan Newsome - DE - Birmingham Stallions
- Antonio Phillips - CB - Vegas Vipers
- Danny Pinter - OL - Indianapolis Colts
- Drew Plitt - QB - Arlington Renegades
- Tuni Ropati - DL - Bay Area Panthers
- Willie Snead IV - WR - San Francisco 49ers
- Jaylin Thomas - LB - Seattle Sea Dragons

=== All-stars ===
Among the numerous Cardinals who have participated in the NFL, CFL, and AFL, three have received all-star recognition by their respective leagues.

- Blaine Bishop - S

NFL Pro Bowl (1995, 1996, 1997, 2000)
NFL All-Pro (1995, 1996, 2000)

- Timmy Brown - RB

NFL Pro Bowl (1962, 1963, 1965)
NFL All-Pro (1963, 1965, 1966)

- Kenny Stucker - K

AFL All-Arena (1996 & 1998)

== Future non-conference opponents ==
Announced schedules as of September 3, 2025.

2026	2027	2028	2029	2030	2031	2032	2033	2034
at Ohio State	at Iowa	at Penn State	at Indiana	at Liberty	Liberty		Wyoming	Middle Tennessee
Stony Brook	Western Kentucky	Indiana State					at Middle Tennessee	
at Liberty	UT Martin	at Western Kentucky						
at Northwestern	at Kentucky							
