= DePauw Tigers football =

American college football team

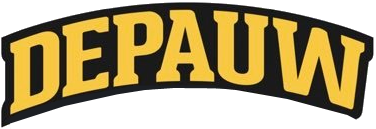
- First season: 1884; 142 years ago
- Athletic director: Stevie Baker-Watson
- Head coach: Brett Dietz; 6th season, 41–7 (.854)
- Location: Greencastle, Indiana
- Stadium: Blackstock Stadium (capacity: 3,000)
- Field: Nick Mourouzis Field
- NCAA division: Division III
- Conference: NCAC
- Colors: Black and old gold
- All-time record: 592–494–40 (.544)

Conference championships
- 13
- Website: depauwtigers.com/football

The DePauw Tigers football team is the American football program for DePauw University, which was established in 1884. DePauw has the 20th most victories in Division III history. The Tigers have been co-champions of the Southern Collegiate Athletic Conference four times (2000, 2005, 2009, and 2010). In addition, they won two championships (1990, 1996) during their membership in the Heartland Collegiate Athletic Conference and five titles (1928, 1930, 1931, 1933 and 1943) in the Indiana Intercollegiate Conference.

In 1933, head coach Ray Neal led the DePauw Tigers football team to an unbeaten, untied, and unscored opening season. The Tigers compiled a 7–0 record and outscored their opponents 136–0. Neal nearly duplicated this feat in 1943, but DePauw, with a record of 5–0–1, finished the season with one scoreless tie and allowed six points in a different game. The only points surrendered that season were in a 39–6 victory over Indiana State, and the only non-win was a 0–0 tie against Oberlin. The Tigers outscored their opponents 206–6.

The Tigers have a longstanding rivalry with nearby Wabash College. Its most visible contest is the annual Monon Bell game.

== Playoff appearances ==
=== NCAA Division III ===
The Tigers have made eight appearances in the NCAA Division III playoffs, with a combined record of 3–7.

Year	Round	Opponent	Result
2009	First Round	Thomas More	L, 39–49
2010	First Round	Trine	L, 35–45
2021	First Round; Second Round	Rose–Hulman; Wisconsin–Whitewater	W, 26–21; L, 0–45
2022	First Round	Carnegie Mellon	L, 14–45
2023	First Round	Alma	L, 17–32
2024	Second Round; Third Round	Maryville (TN); Johns Hopkins	W, 45–20; L, 9–14
2025	Second Round; Third Round	Wisconsin–Whitewater; Wheaton (IL)	W, 26–23; L, 24–49
2026	Second Round	North Central (IL)	TBP
