= Harvey Chrouser =

American football coach and athletics administrator (1912–2002)

Biographical details
- Born: August 7, 1912; Stratford, Wisconsin, U.S.
- Died: April 21, 2002 (aged 89); Winfield, Illinois, U.S.

Coaching career (HC unless noted)
- 1935–1939: Sterling
- 1940–1941: Wheaton (IL)
- 1946–1960: Wheaton (IL)

Administrative career (AD unless noted)
- ?–1940: Sterling
- 1951–?: Wheaton (IL)

Head coaching record
- Overall: 121–55–14

Accomplishments and honors

Championships
- 9 CCI (1949–1950, 1953–1959)

Harvey C. Chrouser (August 7, 1912 – April 21, 2002) was an American college football coach and athletics administrator. He served as the head football coach at Sterling College in Sterling, Kansas from 1935 to 1939 and two stints as the head football coach at Wheaton College in Wheaton, Illinois, from 1940 to 1941 and 1946 to 1960, compiling a career head coaching record of 121–55–14.

== Coaching career ==
=== Sterling ===
Chrouser was the head football coach at Sterling College in Sterling, Kansas for five seasons, from 1935 to 1939, compiling a record of 17–21–6.

=== Wheaton ===
After his work at Sterling, he moved to Wheaton College in Wheaton, Illinois, where he served as athletic director. After a few years of starting at Wheaton, he took a break to serve in the United States Navy as a lieutenant commander under George Halas. Halas wanted him to come to the Chicago Bears as a coach, but Chrouser wanted to return to his work with youth.

Chrouser was the 11th and then later the 14th head coach for the Thunder. He held that position for 17 seasons, from 1940 through 1941 and then again from 1946 until 1960. His coaching record at Wheaton was 104–34–8.

== Head coaching record ==
=== College ===
Year	Team	Overall	Conference	Standing	Bowl/playoffs
Sterling Warriors (Independent) (1935–1939)
1935	Sterling	1–6–1			
1936	Sterling	3–5–2			
1937	Sterling	1–7–1			
1938	Sterling	7–1			
1939	Sterling	5–2–2			
Sterling:		17–21–6			
Wheaton Crusaders (Illinois College Conference) (1940–1941)
1940	Wheaton	1–6–1	0–1	8th	
1941	Wheaton	3–5–2	0–2–1	T–8th	
Wheaton Crusaders (College Conference of Illinois) (1946–1959)
1946	Wheaton	6–2	3–1	T–2nd	
1947	Wheaton	7–1–1	4–1	2nd	
1948	Wheaton	6–2	4–1	T–2nd	
1949	Wheaton	8–2	5–0	T–1st	L Corn
1950	Wheaton	7–2	5–0	1st	
1951	Wheaton	6–2	3–1	2nd	
1952	Wheaton	7–1	4–1	3rd	
1953	Wheaton	8–1	4–0	1st	
1954	Wheaton	6–2	5–1	T–1st	
1955	Wheaton	6–1–1	5–0–1	1st	
1956	Wheaton	7–1	7–0	1st	
1957	Wheaton	8–1	6–1	T–1st	
1958	Wheaton	8–0	7–0	1st	
1959	Wheaton	6–1–2	6–0–1	1st	
Wheaton Crusaders (NAIA independent) (1960)
1960	Wheaton	4–4–1			
Wheaton:		104–34–8	68–10–2		
Total:		121–55–14			
National championship Conference title Conference division title or championship game berth
