= Cincinnati Bearcats football =

University of Cincinnati's football team

2026 Cincinnati Bearcats football team
- First season: 1885; 141 years ago
- Athletic director: John Cunningham
- Head coach: Scott Satterfield; 4th season, 15–22 (.405)
- Location: Cincinnati, Ohio
- Stadium: Nippert Stadium (capacity: 40,124)
- Field: Carson Field
- NCAA division: Division I FBS
- Conference: Big 12
- Colors: Red and black
- All-time record: 674–622–50 (.519)
- CFP record: 0–1 (.000)
- Bowl record: 10–13 (.435)

College Football Playoff appearances
- 2021

Conference championships
- Buckeye: 1933, 1934 MAC: 1947, 1949, 1951, 1952 MVC: 1963, 1964 C-USA: 2002 Big East: 2008, 2009, 2011, 2012 AAC: 2014, 2020, 2021

Division championships
- AAC East: 2019
- Consensus All-Americans: 5
- Rivalries: UCF (rivalry); Louisville (rivalry); Memphis (rivalry); Miami (OH) (rivalry); Pittsburgh; West Virginia (rivalry); Xavier (rivalry; dormant)

Uniforms
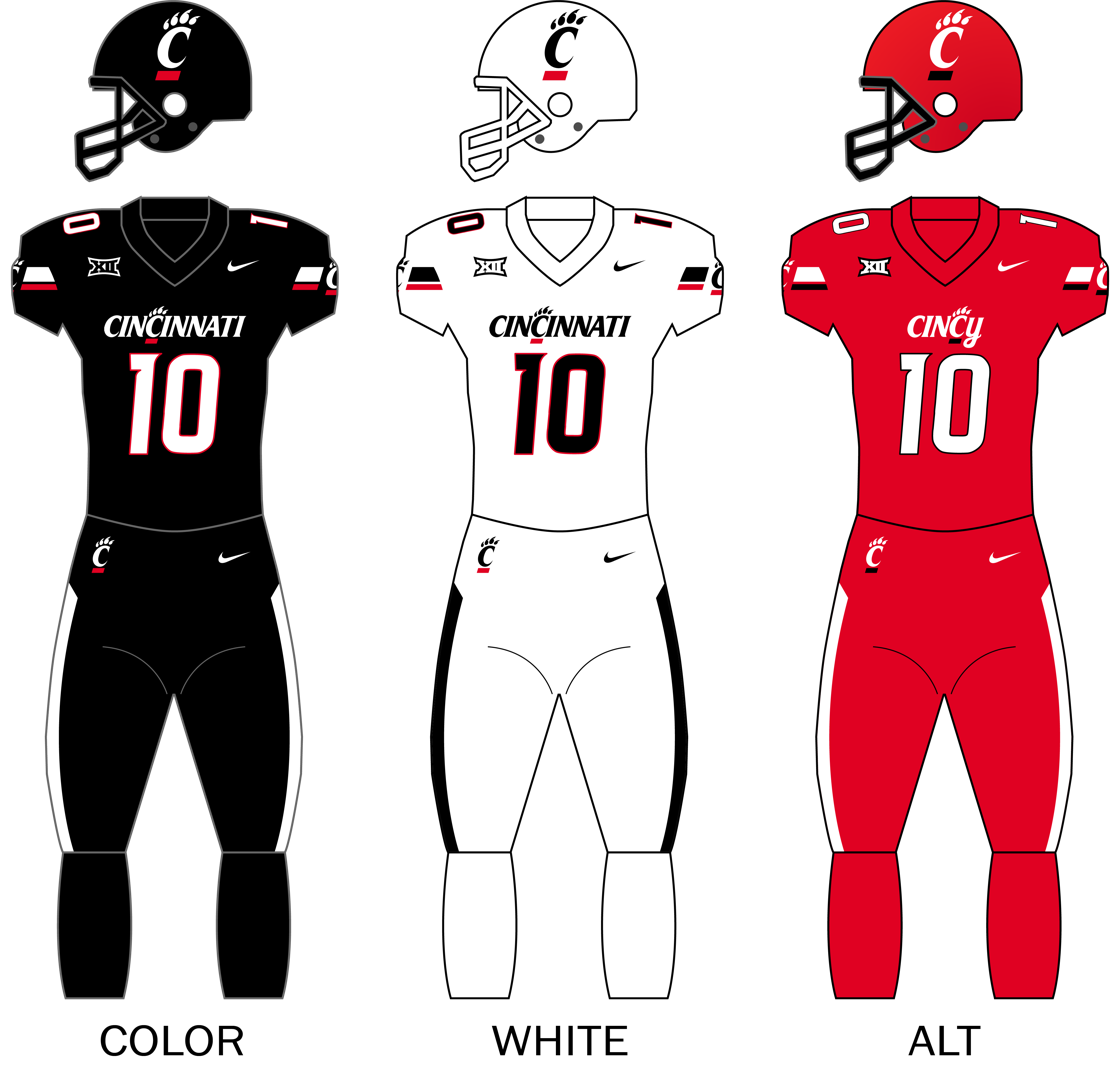
- Fight song: "Cheer Cincinnati"
- Mascot: The Bearcat
- Marching band: University of Cincinnati Bearcat Bands
- Outfitter: Nike
- Website: gobearcats.com

The Cincinnati Bearcats football team represents the University of Cincinnati in college football. They compete at the NCAA Division I Football Bowl Subdivision level as members of the Big 12 Conference. They have played their home games at Nippert Stadium since 1901. The Bearcats have an all-time record of over .500, having reached their 600th program victory in 2017.

The Bearcats were largely independent for the 19th and 20th century, with sporadic membership in four conferences, the longest of which was their 12 years with the Missouri Valley Conference in the 1950s and 60s. The team briefly dropped down to Division I-AA (now Division I Football Championship Subdivision (FCS)) in 1982 and 1983, and later joined Conference USA in 1996. They would move to the Big East in 2005, and remain with the conference when it split into the American Athletic in 2013. The Bearcats joined the Big 12 in 2023.

Cincinnati has won 16 conference championships across six difference conferences, most recently in 2021 as a member of the American Athletic Conference. That year they also qualified for the College Football Playoff, the only non-power team to do so during the tournament's four-team playoff structure. The Bearcats have also played in three non-playoff New Year's Six bowl games, and 23 bowl games overall.

== History ==
=== Early history (1885–1983) ===
The Bearcat football program is one of the nation's oldest, having fielded a team as early as 1885. In 1888, Cincinnati played Miami in the first intercollegiate football game held within the state of Ohio. That began a rivalry which today ranks as the eighth-oldest and 11th-longest running in NCAA Division I college football.

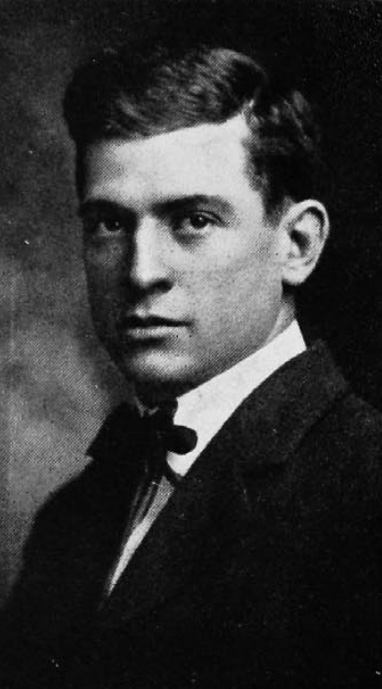
Robert Burch served as head coach from 1909 to 1911

Robert Burch served as Cincinnati's head coach from 1909 to 1911, compiling a record of 16–8–2. It was during his tenure that Cincinnati joined the Ohio Athletic Conference, where they would remain until 1927. In March 1927, George Babcock was hired as a professor of athletics and physical training at the University of Cincinnati. From 1927 to 1930, he was the head football coach of the Bearcats football, compiling a 12–21–3 record. Sid Gillman, a member of the college and National Football League hall of fame shrines, was the architect of one of the top eras of Cincinnati football history. He directed the Bearcats to three conference titles and a pair of bowl game appearances during his six seasons (1949–54) before leaving for the professional ranks. Cincinnati, with Gillman developing the passing offenses which would make him successful in the pro ranks, became known for its aerial attack in the early 1950s. George Blackburn served as the Bearcats' head coach from 1955 to 1960, compiling a 25–27–6 record. It was during Blackburn's tenure, in 1957, that the Bearcats joined the Missouri Valley Conference, where they would remain until 1969.

Chuck Studley left UMass and became the Bearcats' 25th head football coach. Under Studley's tutelage, the Bearcats won two conference championships in 1963 and 1964, However, Studley's teams struggled in his other four seasons and Studley was replaced after the 1966 season. Oklahoma assistant coach Homer Rice was hired as Studley's replacement. After Rice accepted the head coaching position at Cincinnati, Oklahoma's head coach Jim Mackenzie died of a massive heart attack. Upon Mackenzie's death, Oklahoma's athletic director and president called Homer Rice to request that he return to replace Mackenzie as head coach at Oklahoma. Rice had already hired his staff at Cincinnati and turned down the Oklahoma job to stay committed to his staff at Cincinnati. Rice compiled an 8–10–1 record in his two seasons at Cincinnati. In 1968, the Bearcats were the nation's top passing team. Quarterback Greg Cook was the NCAA's total offense leader with receiver/kicker Jim O'Brien the national scoring champ. A year later, Cook earned Rookie of the Year honors as a Cincinnati Bengal. Two years later, O'Brien kicked the game-winning field goal for the Baltimore Colts in Super Bowl V. Ray Callahan was promoted from assistant coach to head coach after Rice's departure. After a 4–6 campaign in his first season, Callahan's Bearcats posted back to back 7–4 records in 1970 and 1971. However, a 2–9 season in 1972 ended his tenure at Cincinnati.

UC's fortunes turned around under head coach Tony Mason, who led the Bearcats for four seasons and compiled a 25–19 record. Mason's Bearcats started slow, but enjoyed an 8–3 campaign in 1976, after which Mason was offered the head coaching position at Arizona, which he accepted. Ohio State assistant coach Ralph Staub was hired as Mason's replacement, and the Bearcats stumbled mightily. Staub's Bearcats posted records of 5–4–2, 5–6, 2–9 and 2–9 for a total of 14–28–2. Staub was fired following the 1980 season. Staub was replaced by Mike Gottfried, who had been head coach at Murray State the previous four seasons. Gottfried was able to improve UC's fortunes, posting back-to-back 6–5 records in 1981 and 1982, however, Gottfried left UC for the head coaching position at Kansas after just two seasons. Gottfried's record at UC is 12–10. Due to an NCAA decision to mandate average attendance of 20,000 for Division I-A programs, Cincinnati was relegated to NCAA Division I-AA for the 1983 season due to consistently low attendance figures. Vanderbilt offensive coordinator Watson Brown, brother of legendary coach Mack Brown, replaced Gottfried but he too, left after only a short period of time. Brown's 1983 squad posted a 4–6–1 record. Brown resigned after the 1983 season to accept the position of head football coach at Rice.

=== Dave Currey era (1984–1988) ===
Long Beach State head coach Dave Currey was hired as Brown's replacement, and the Bearcats' struggles returned. Currey failed to post a single winning season as UC's head coach and, after a 3–8 campaign in 1988, Currey resigned following NCAA sanctions for violating rules around scholarships, financial aid and recruiting.

=== Tim Murphy era (1989–1993) ===
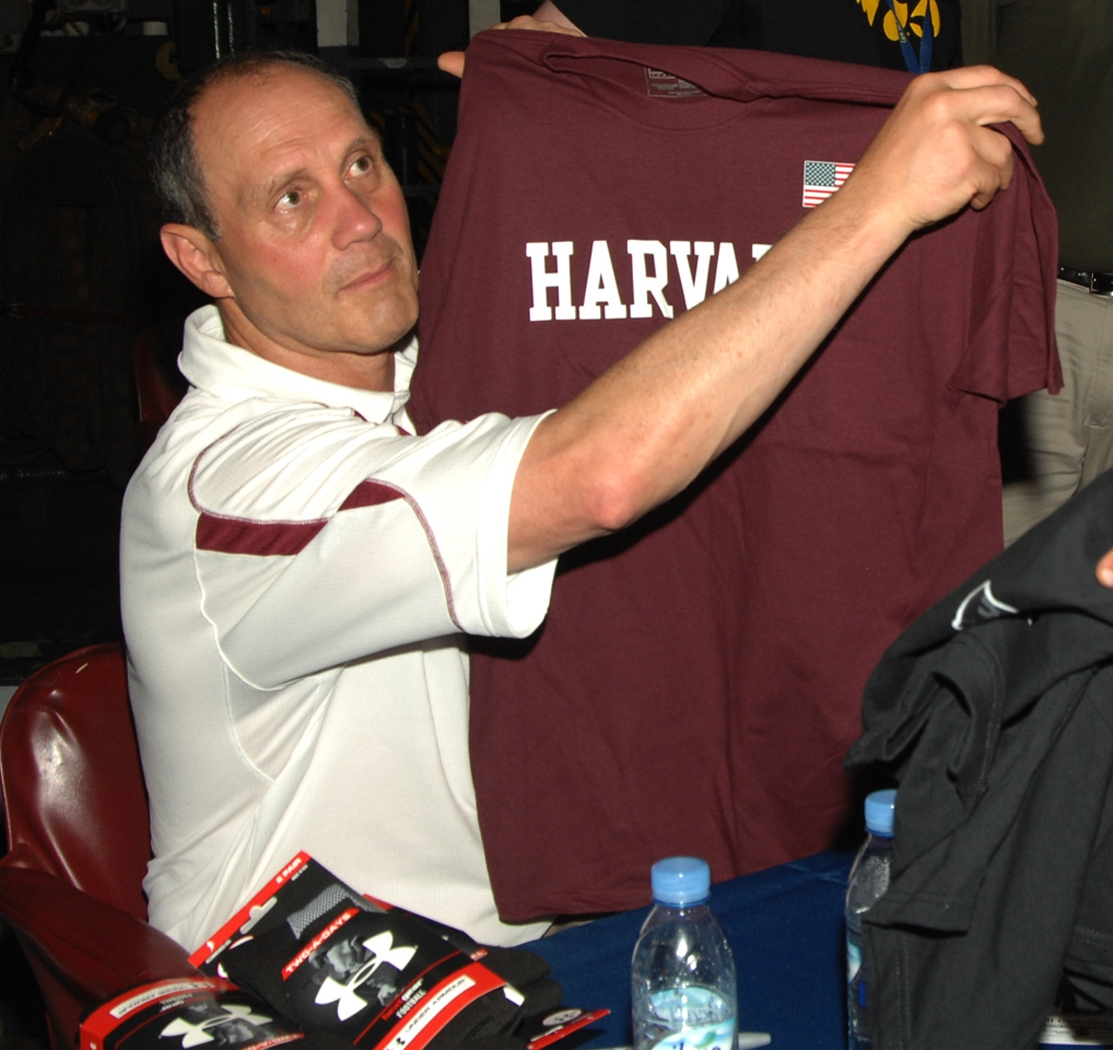
Coach Murphy

Maine head coach Tim Murphy was hired to replace Currey in 1989. Despite one-win seasons in both of his first two seasons, Murphy was able to slowly but surely turn things around for the Bearcats, compiling an 8–3 record in 1993.

Murphy elected to leave Cincinnati after the 1993 season for the head coaching position at Harvard. Murphy left UC with a 17–37–1 record.

=== Rick Minter era (1994–2003) ===
Notre Dame defensive coordinator Rick Minter was selected as the Bearcats head coach after Murphy's departure. Minter's Bearcats enjoyed mild success, reaching four bowl games (winning one) and posting six winning seasons in Minter's ten-season tenure. It was during Minter's tenure that Cincinnati joined Conference USA, where they would remain until 2004. Minter remained UC's head coach until after the 2003 season, when he was fired following a 5–7 season. Minter left UC with a 53–63–1 record.

=== Mark Dantonio era (2004–2006) ===
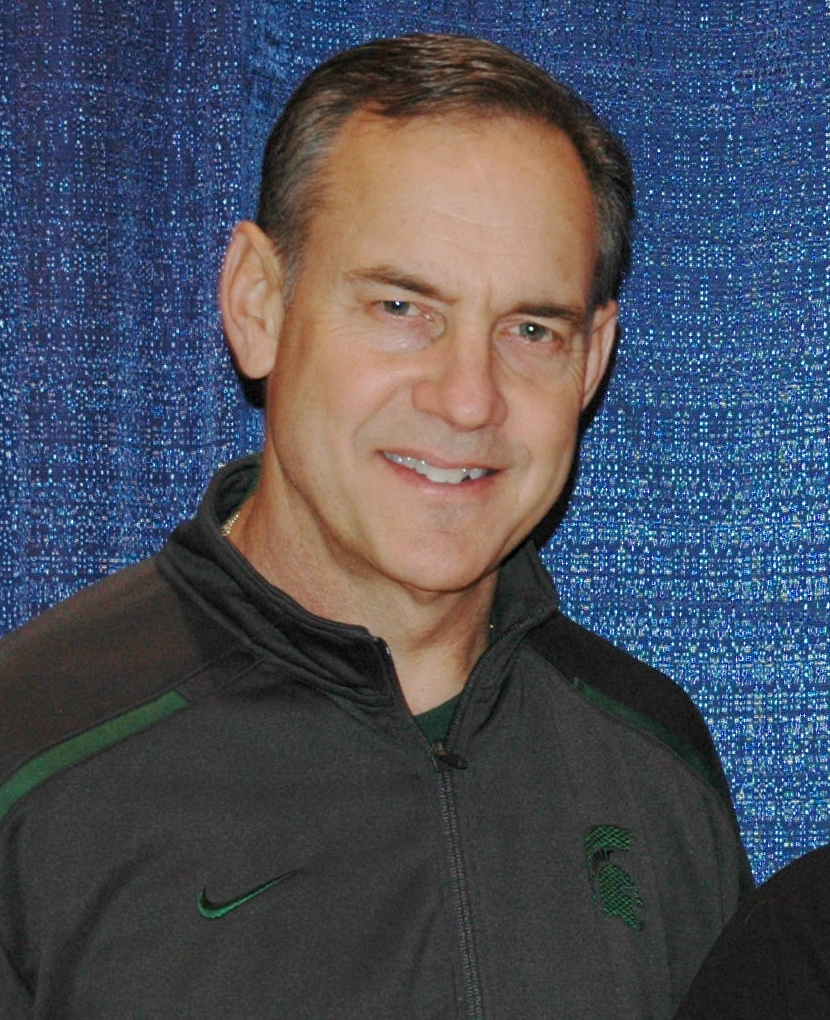
Coach Dantonio

Ohio State defensive coordinator Mark Dantonio was named head coach at Cincinnati on December 23, 2003. Dantonio became the first head coach in 23 years to lead the school to a winning season in his first season at UC. The Bearcats' 7–5 record included a 5–3 record in Conference USA, which was good enough for a second-place finish. The Bearcats finished the season on a winning note with a 32–14 win over Marshall in the PlainsCapital Fort Worth Bowl.

During Dantonio's time at UC, he led the Bearcats to a bowl game victory and directed the team's transition into the Big East Conference in 2005, where they would remain until 2012. As head coach, Dantonio had 15 players earn all-conference honors and 25 received conference academic recognition. Dantonio's Bearcats posted a 4–7 mark in 2005 which was followed by an 8–5 campaign in 2006.

Dantonio left UC after the 2006 season to accept the head coaching position at Michigan State.

=== Brian Kelly era (2007–2009) ===
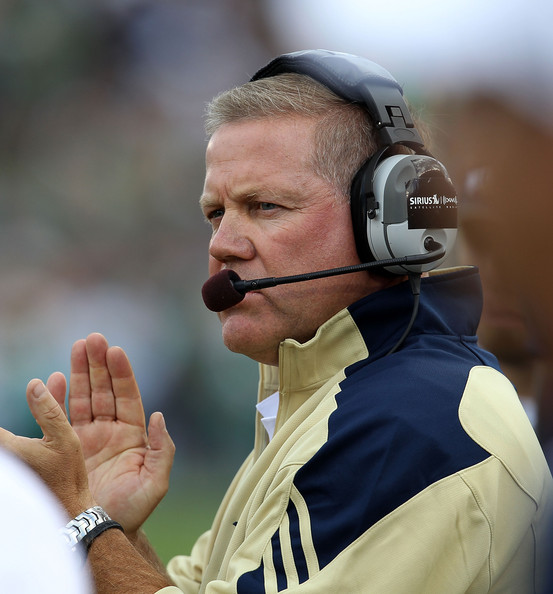
Coach Kelly

Central Michigan head coach Brian Kelly was named head coach on December 3, 2006, following the departure of Mark Dantonio. In an unusual move, Cincinnati elected not to appoint an interim coach and asked Kelly to assume his duties immediately by coaching the Bearcats in their bowl game. Central Michigan was also preparing for a bowl appearance, so while Kelly was in Cincinnati preparing the Bearcats, much of his staff remained at Central Michigan to coach the Chippewas. Following Central Michigan's 31–14 win in the Motor City Bowl on December 26, his staff joined him and went on to coach Cincinnati to a 27–24 victory over Western Michigan University in that year's International Bowl on January 6. Cincinnati's victory gave Kelly the unique distinction of having defeated the same team twice in a season as coach of two teams (Central Michigan had defeated Western Michigan 31–7 earlier that season).

In his first full season, Kelly led Cincinnati to a competitive position in the Big East, the Bearcats' second ever 10-win season (its first since 1949), and a Top 25 ranking. On December 5, 2007, Kelly was named Big East Coach of the Year, after leading the Bearcats to a 9–3 record. Kelly led the Bearcats to a 31–21 victory in the PapaJohns.com Bowl over Southern Miss.

In 2008, Kelly led Cincinnati to its first ever outright Big East title with key wins over West Virginia and Pittsburgh. The Bearcats had never defeated either in Big East conference play. Kelly became the first coach to win all three of the Bearcats' traveling trophies— the Victory Bell (Miami [OH]), the Keg of Nails (Louisville), and the River City Rivalry Trophy (Pitt). The Bearcats played in the Orange Bowl versus the ACC champion, Virginia Tech, on January 1, 2009, but lost 20–7 to finish the season 11–3.

After beginning the 2009 season unranked in all polls, the Bearcats reeled off 12 straight victories and finished the regular season undefeated. Going into the bowl season, they were ranked No. 3 in the BCS Standings and faced the Florida Gators in the Sugar Bowl. Kelly did not coach the team in the 51–24 loss to Florida because he accepted the head coach position at Notre Dame.

Among the honors that Cincinnati football achieved in 2009, was the highest academic rating among teams in the top 10 of the BCS standings, according to the 2009 Graduation Success Rates. Cincinnati, which was fifth in the BCS standings, checked in with a 75% NCAA graduation rate and a 71% federal government rate, the only team in the BCS top 10 to surpass 70% in both. Kelly finished his tenure at Cincinnati with a 34–6 record.

=== Butch Jones era (2010–2012) ===
On December 16, 2009, Central Michigan head coach Butch Jones was named head coach of the Cincinnati Bearcats. The hiring was an odd coincidence, as Jones had also replaced Brian Kelly as head coach at Central Michigan.

Jones led the Bearcats to records of 4–8 in 2010 and 10–3 in 2011, including a Big East championship, a Liberty Bowl victory over Vanderbilt, and he was named Big East Coach of the Year. Also in 2011, Cincinnati was the only program to win both its conference championship as well as the league's team academic award.

Jones led the Bearcats to a 9–3 regular season record in 2012, leading them to the Belk Bowl in Charlotte to play against Duke University, a game Cincinnati won. Twenty days prior to the bowl game, on December 7, 2012, Jones announced to the team that he would be resigning to accept the job as head football coach at Tennessee, after declining offers from Colorado, Purdue, and others.

=== Tommy Tuberville era (2013–2016) ===
On December 8, 2012, Texas Tech head coach Tommy Tuberville, formerly head coach at Ole Miss and Auburn accepted the head coaching position at Cincinnati with a $2.2 million contract. Cincinnati's athletic director, Whit Babcock, had previously worked with Tuberville at Auburn; the two have been friends for several years. On December 9 an article in the Lubbock Avalanche-Journal pointed out that Cincinnati is only 30 miles from Guilford, Indiana, home of Tuberville's wife, Suzanne.

In 2013, his first season with Cincinnati, Tuberville led the Bearcats into the American Athletic Conference with an overall record of 9–4 and a 6–2 conference record. His 2014 team was also 9–4 overall, but this time earned an American Athletic Conference co-championship by virtue of their 7–1 league mark. Both years also saw bowl losses, in 2013 to North Carolina and 2014 to Virginia Tech. After a 7–5 season in 2015 the Bearcats were defeated by San Diego State 42–7 in the Hawai'i Bowl

On December 4, 2016, after a 4–8 season, Tuberville resigned as head coach of Cincinnati. Tuberville left Cincinnati with an overall record of 29–22 and 18–14 in AAC conference play.

=== Luke Fickell era (2017–2022) ===
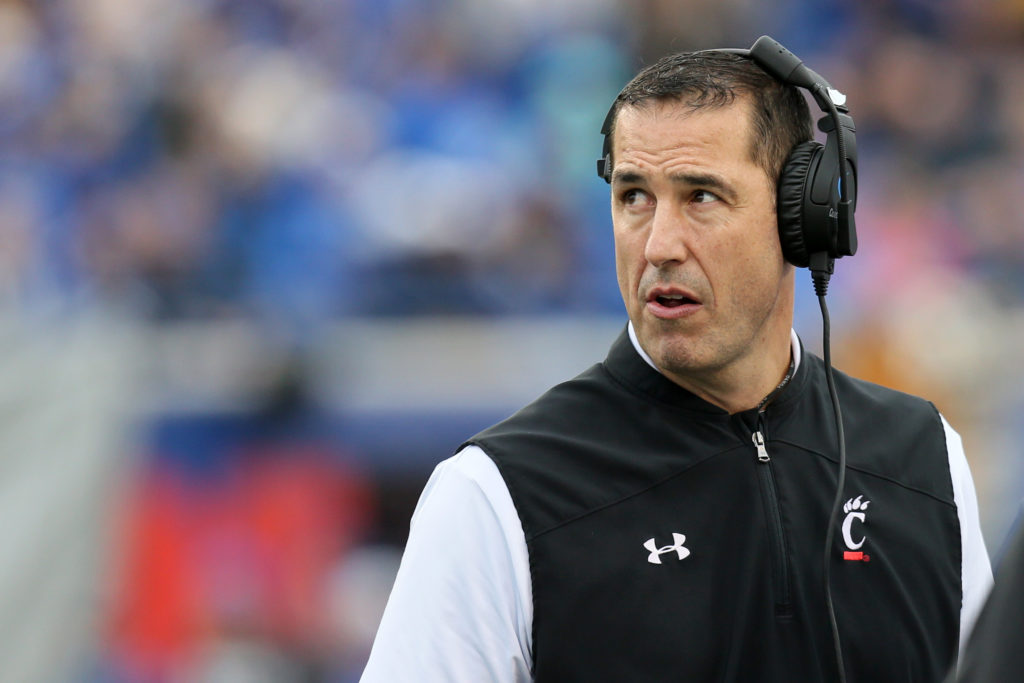
Coach Fickell

Cincinnati lined up against a kick by Navy in their 2021 game

On December 10, 2016, Ohio State defensive coordinator/associate head coach Luke Fickell was named UC's head coach, replacing Tuberville. Fickell had also served as Ohio State's head coach during the 2011 season after a scandal forced out previous coach Jim Tressel.

During the 2017 season the Bearcats compiled a record of 4–8. The 2018 season saw a much improved team, with the Bearcats finishing with an 11–2 (6–2 AAC) record, and winning the Military Bowl against Virginia Tech. The 11-win season was only the third such season in the history of the program. Fickell was given the AAC Coach of the Year honor for the season. Under Fickell's direction in 2019, the Bearcats won the AAC East Division and played in the AAC Championship. The Bearcats won the Birmingham Bowl, their 2nd straight bowl win and finished the 2019 campaign with its 2nd consecutive 11-win season.

Fickell built on the success of the 2019 season, with the 2020 campaign producing his best yet result despite a season mired with COVID-19 cancellations and postponements. The Bearcats returned to the AAC Championship game, this time defeating Tulsa to end the regular season with an undefeated record. Fickell returned the Bearcats to a New Year's Six bowl, losing a close game to Georgia in the Peach Bowl.

The Bearcats went undefeated in the regular season in 2021, including a road victory against Notre Dame and former Bearcats coach Brian Kelly. After defeating Houston in the AAC Championship, Cincinnati became the first Group of Five team to qualify to the College Football Playoff. They lost to Alabama in the Cotton Bowl.

In 2022, Cincinnati would finish in the regular season 9–3 and 6–2 in AAC play, but were not able to qualify for the AAC Championship. On November 27, 2022, Fickell was hired by Wisconsin to replace Paul Chryst as head coach, and cornerbacks coach and special–teams coordinator Kerry Coombs would be promoted to interim head coach. Fickell would leave Cincinnati as the coach with the most career wins in program history.

=== Scott Satterfield era (2022–present) ===
On December 5, 2022, Scott Satterfield was named the head coach of the Cincinnati Bearcats. Coincidentally, Satterfield's former team, the rival Louisville Cardinals, were set to play Cincinnati only a few days later in the 2022 Fenway Bowl. Satterfield described the situation as odd, and did not coach with either team, instead spending time with his family at home. On September 9, 2023, Satterfield and the Bearcats defeated the Pittsburgh Panthers 27–21, in the first ever college football game aired on The CW. With five straight conference wins and a 7–1 start to the 2025 season, the Satterfield-led Bearcats were ranked in the AP and Coaches' Poll for the first time since the 2022 season. Cincinnati would go on to lose all of their remaining regular season games, finishing with a 7–5 record. They would receive an invitation to the Liberty Bowl, their first invite under Satterfield, and would lose to Navy 13–35.

== Conference affiliations ==
Cincinnati has been both an independent and affiliated with multiple conferences.

- Independent (1885–1909)
- Ohio Athletic Conference (1910–1925)
- Buckeye Conference (1926–1937)
- Independent (1938–1946) (Note: No games played in 1943–1944 due to World War II.)
- Mid-American Conference (1947–1952)
- Independent (1953–1956)
- Missouri Valley Conference (1957–1969)
- NCAA Division I-A independent (1970–1981)
- NCAA Division I-AA independent (1982–1983)
- NCAA Division I-A independent (1984–1995)
- Conference USA (1996–2004)
- Big East Conference (2005–2012)
- American Athletic Conference (2013–2022)
- Big 12 Conference (2023–present)

== Championships ==
=== Conference championships ===
Cincinnati has won 15 conference championships, nine outright and six shared.

Season	Conference	Coach	Overall record	Conference record
1933†	Buckeye Athletic Association	Dana M. King	7–2	3–1
1934	Buckeye Athletic Association	Dana M. King	6–2–1	2–0–1
1947	Mid-American Conference	Ray Nolting	7–3	3–1
1949	Mid-American Conference	Sid Gillman	7–4	4–0
1951	Mid-American Conference	Sid Gillman	10–1	3–0
1952	Mid-American Conference	Sid Gillman	8–1–1	3–0
1963†	Missouri Valley Conference	Chuck Studley	6–4	3–1
1964	Missouri Valley Conference	Chuck Studley	8–2	4–0
2002†	Conference USA	Rick Minter	7–7	6–2
2008	Big East Conference	Brian Kelly	11–3	6–1
2009	Big East Conference	Brian Kelly	12–1	7–0
2011†	Big East Conference	Butch Jones	10–3	5–2
2012†	Big East Conference	Butch Jones	10–3	5–2
2014†	American Athletic Conference	Tommy Tuberville	9–4	7–1
2020	American Athletic Conference	Luke Fickell	9–1	6–0
2021	American Athletic Conference	Luke Fickell	13–1	8–0

† Co-champions

=== Division championships ===
Season	Division	Coach	Opponent	CG result
2019	AAC East	Luke Fickell	Memphis	L 24–29

== Bowl games ==
The Bearcats have participated in 23 postseason bowl games, with a record of 10–13. The program's first postseason games were by the 1897 Cincinnati football team, which played in two games in New Orleans in January 1898.

Year	Coach	Bowl	Opponent	Result
1946	Ray Nolting	Sun Bowl	Virginia Tech	W 18–6
1949	Sid Gillman	Glass Bowl†	Toledo	W 33–13
1950	Sid Gillman	Sun Bowl	West Texas State	L 13–14
1997	Rick Minter	Humanitarian Bowl	Utah State	W 35–19
2000	Rick Minter	Motor City Bowl	Marshall	L 14–25
2001	Rick Minter	Motor City Bowl	Toledo	L 16–23
2002	Rick Minter	New Orleans Bowl	North Texas	L 19–24
2004	Mark Dantonio	Fort Worth Bowl	Marshall	W 32–14
2006	Brian Kelly	International Bowl	Western Michigan	W 27–24
2007	Brian Kelly	PapaJohns.com Bowl	Southern Miss	W 31–21
2008	Brian Kelly	Orange Bowl ^{1}	Virginia Tech	L 7–20
2009	Jeff Quinn (interim)	Sugar Bowl ^{1}	Florida	L 24–51
2011	Butch Jones	Liberty Bowl	Vanderbilt	W 31–24
2012	Steve Stripling (interim)	Belk Bowl	Duke	W 48–34
2013	Tommy Tuberville	Belk Bowl	North Carolina	L 17–39
2014	Tommy Tuberville	Military Bowl	Virginia Tech	L 17–33
2015	Tommy Tuberville	Hawaii Bowl	San Diego State	L 7–42
2018	Luke Fickell	Military Bowl	Virginia Tech	W 35–31
2019	Luke Fickell	Birmingham Bowl	Boston College	W 38–6
2020	Luke Fickell	Peach Bowl ^{1}	Georgia	L 21–24
2021	Luke Fickell	Cotton Bowl^{1}	Alabama	L 6–27
2022	Kerry Coombs (interim)	Fenway Bowl	Louisville	L 7–24
2025	Scott Satterfield	Liberty Bowl	Navy	L 13–35

†The Glass Bowl is listed in NCAA records, but was not considered an NCAA-sanctioned bowl; Cincinnati counts the bowl game in their records.

^{1}CFP/New Year's Six/BCS game

=== Playoffs ===
Cincinnati was selected as the fourth seed in the College Football Playoff following the 2021 season.

Year	Seed	Opponent	Round	Result
2021	4	No. 1 Alabama	Semi-Finals – Cotton Bowl	L 6–27

== Personnel ==
=== Coaching staff ===
Cincinnati Bearcats
Name	Position	Consecutive season(s) at Cincinnati in current position	Previous position
Scott Satterfield	Head coach	3rd	Louisville – Head coach (2019–2022)
Nate Woody	Defensive coordinator	1st	Army – Defensive coordinator (2020–2026)
Luke Paschall	Special teams coordinator	2nd	Middle Tennessee State - Special teams coordinator (2024)
Cortney Braswell	Co-defensive coordinator / linebackers	3rd	Army – Inside linebackers (2021–2022)
Nic Cardwell	Co-Offensive Coordinator / Offensive line	3rd	Louisville – Offensive line (2022)
Pete Thomas	Co-Offensive Coordinator / Quarterbacks	3rd	Louisville – Quarterbacks (2021–2022)
Vijay Stingley	Wide receivers	1st	Louisville – graduate assistant (2020 - 2021)
Sean Dawkins	Running backs	2nd	Memphis – Running backs (2021–2023)
Josh Stepp	Tight ends	3rd	Louisville – Tight ends (2022)
Walter Stewart	Defensive line	4th	Temple – Defensive line (2019–2021)
Adam Braithwaite	Safeties	2nd	Samford—Defensive coordinator/Safeties (2024)
David Rowe	Cornerbacks	1st	Rutgers—Cornerbacks (2024–2025)

== Rivalries ==
=== Miami (OH) ===
The Victory Bell is the trophy awarded to the winner of the American college football rivalry game played by the Cincinnati and Miami (OH). The Victory Bell is the oldest current non-conference college football rivalry in the United States (though the teams were conference rivals for a few years in the late 1940s and early 1950s).

The Bearcats and RedHawks (formerly the Redskins) square off each fall for the Victory Bell. The first game in the series, played on December 8, 1888, in Oxford, Ohio, was the first college football game played in the state of Ohio. The original bell hung in Miami's Harrison Hall (Old Main) near the site of the first game and was used to ring in Miami victories. The traveling trophy tradition began in the 1890s when some Cincinnati fans "borrowed" the bell. The bell went to the winner of the annual game for the next forty years until it mysteriously disappeared in the 1930s. The original bell reappeared in 1946 and is on display in the lobby of Miami's Murstein Alumni Center. The trophy is a replica of the original bell and is kept in the possession of the winning team each year. One side of the bell is painted black with white numbers showing Cincinnati's victories, while the other side is white with red numbers showing Miami's victories. Ties are indicated on the top of the red yoke in white numbers.

The Bearcats won 16 straight meetings between 2006 and 2022 to take the overall series lead at 60–59–7. However, in 2023, Miami upset the Bearcats to tie the series again at 60–60–7. Cincinnati responded by claiming a double-digit victory, 27–16, in 2024, once again putting the Bearcats ahead in the series 61–60–7.

=== Louisville ===
The Keg of Nails is the name of the rivalry between Cincinnati and Louisville. The rivalry has stretched over the span of four conferences from the Missouri Valley Conference, to the Metro Conference to Conference USA, and more recently in the Big East Conference, which in 2013 was renamed to the American Athletic Conference. It is believed to be the oldest rivalry for the Louisville football team and the second oldest for Cincinnati, only behind the annual game with the Miami RedHawks.

The trophy is a replica of a keg used to ship nails. The exchange is believed to have been initiated by fraternity chapters on the UC and U of L campuses, signifying that the winning players in the game were "tough as nails." The present keg is a replacement for the original award, which was lost during construction of office facilities in Louisville. It features the logos of both schools and the scores of games in the series.

The rivalry went on hiatus following the 2013 season, as Louisville moved to the Atlantic Coast Conference on July 1, 2014, and remains on hiatus following Cincinnati's move to the Big 12 Conference, which occurred on July 1, 2023.

=== West Virginia ===
The teams met 20 times between 1921 and 2011, every year from 2005 to 2011, as conference foes and members of the Big East Conference. The schools have competed as Big 12 Conference opponents since 2023, after Cincinnati's invite into the conference. West Virginia leads Cincinnati in the series 14-3-1 since 2024.

=== UCF ===
The rivalry between the two schools is 6–5 in favor of Cincinnati, since its conception in 2014. Both teams have competed against one another in the Big 12 Conference since 2023.

=== Pittsburgh ===
The River City Rivalry is the name of the rivalry between Cincinnati and Pittsburgh. The rivalry itself was relatively brief, played annually from 2005, during which season the rivalry trophy was introduced. Before the rivalry was titled, the two teams played each other in 1921, 1922, 1979, and 1981. The rivalry went on hiatus, like many others throughout the country, in the aftermath of the 2010–13 NCAA conference realignment, which left the programs in separate leagues. However, the two teams then met in a home-and-home series in the 2023 and 2024 seasons.

The Paddlewheel Trophy is the rivalry trophy that was created in 2005 when the Bearcats joined the Big East Conference to which the Pittsburgh Panthers already belonged. The trophy is designed and named in honor the historic link between the cities from the days in the 19th and early-20th centuries when Paddle wheel-powered boats traveled between the two cities along the Ohio River.

The 2009 match-up between Cincinnati and Pittsburgh was described by one national columnist as the most "fascinating game I've ever seen." The game functioned as a Big East championship game, with Cincinnati entering first in the conference, and Pittsburgh at second. Additionally, the Bearcats entered the game undefeated and trying to earn a spot in the BCS National Championship Game, while the 9–2 Panthers were trying to secure their first BCS bowl since the 2004 season. The Panthers had an early 31–10 lead, however, the ensuing kickoff was returned for a touchdown by Mardy Gilyard to make it a 31–17 game at halftime. Cincinnati completed the comeback, tying the game at 38 late in the 4th quarter. Pittsburgh running back Dion Lewis scored a touchdown with 1:36 left in the game, but a mishandled snap by Andrew Janocko prevented the Panthers from converting the extra point. The Bearcats then drove down the field and scored on a 29-yard touchdown pass from Tony Pike to Armon Binns with 33 seconds left. Bearcats kicker Jake Rodgers converted the extra point attempt, and Cincinnati held on to win 45–44. Following the game, Cincinnati rose to a No. 3 ranking in the final BCS standing while Pitt dropped to No. 17. The game has been described as "one of the most crushing losses in the history of Pitt football." Though the rivalry has gone into hiatus upon Pittsburgh's move to the Atlantic Coast Conference it was then renewed in a Home and Home series in 2023 and 2024, respectively. In the aftermath of the 2021–22 NCAA conference realignment the series will once again be a battle of power conference foes as the first game of the series will take place in Cincinnati's first year in the Big 12 Conference.

=== Memphis ===
Cincinnati and Memphis have played a total of 36 times across a number of conferences. After the establishment of the American Athletic Conference in 2013, the series was renewed from the days of Conference USA. Most notably, in the 2019 season the two teams would face off twice in consecutive weeks, with both games being hosted by Memphis. The second game would be the 2019 American Athletic Conference Football Championship Game in which the Tigers would beat the Bearcats for the second straight week. Cincinnati and Memphis met again in 2020 at Nippert with the Bearcats defeating the Tigers 49–10. The teams have not played since Cincinnati's move into the Big 12 Conference on July 1, 2023.

=== Xavier ===
Cincinnati and Xavier would first play in 1918, but the series would not become an annual event until 1946. The game would be played each year at Cincinnati's Nippert Stadium as the venue had a larger capacity to accommodate the cross city showdown compared to Xavier's Corcoran Stadium. The series, and Xavier's football program, would come to a close after the 1973 series. Cincinnati leads the historic series, 18–12.

== Individual honors ==
=== Unanimous First Team All-Americans ===
Year	Player	Position
2022	Ivan Pace Jr.	LB

=== Consensus First Team All-Americans ===
Year	Player	Position
2000	Jonathan Ruffin	K
2007, 2008	Kevin Huber	P
2021	Sauce Gardner	DB
2022	Ivan Pace Jr.	LB

=== College football awards ===
Year	Award	Player	Position
2000	Lou Groza Award	Jonathan Ruffin	K
2021	Jim Thorpe Award	Coby Bryant	DB

=== Ring of Honor ===
Cincinnati has honored the following players, with their names and numbers displayed in Nippert Stadium.

No.	Player	Position	Career
5	Tom Marvaso	S	1973–1975
8	Gino Guidugli	QB	2001–2004
8	Danny McCoin	QB	1984–1987
12	Greg Cook	QB	1966–1968
16	Jack Lee	QB	1957–1959
16	Jonathan Ruffin	K	1999–2002
19	Shaq Washington	WR	2011–2015
27	Tom O'Malley	QB	1947–1949
28	Gene Rossi	QB	1950–1952
29	Bill Shalosky	G	1950–1952
30	Mike Woods	LB	1975–1977
30	Reggie Taylor	RB	1983–1986
47	Kevin Huber	P	2005–2008
62	Dick Goist	RB	1951–1954

=== College Football Hall of Fame inductees ===
Inductee	Position	Class	Career	Ref.
Frank Cavanaugh	Head coach	1954	1898	
George Little	Head coach	1955	1914–1915	
Sid Gillman	Head coach	1989	1949–1954	

== Bearcats in the NFL ==
=== NFL draft picks and professional players ===
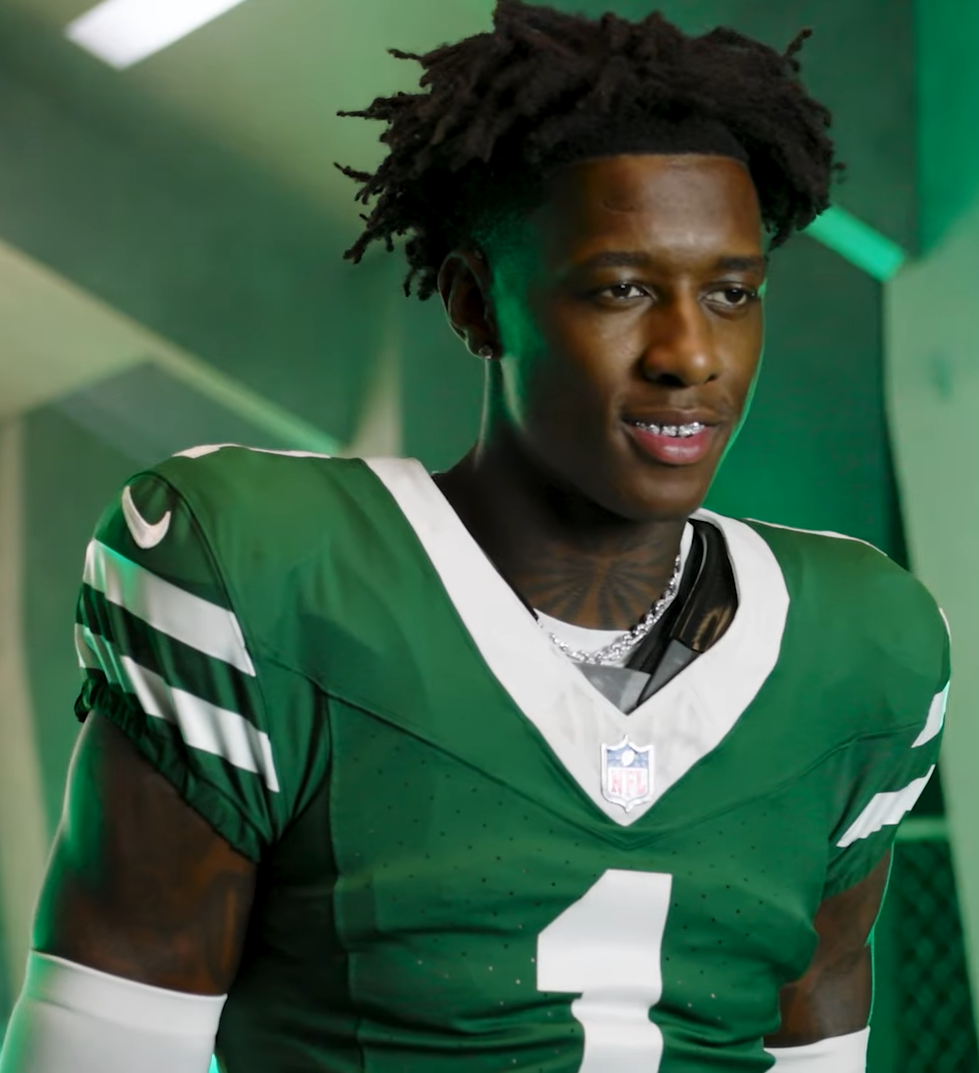
Sauce Gardner was drafted 4th overall by the New York Jets in 2022, the highest selection of a Bearcat in the NFL draft

First round draft picks

Name	Position	Year	Overall pick	Team
Greg Cook	QB	1969	5	Cincinnati Bengals
Bob Bell	DT	1971	21	Detroit Lions
Sauce Gardner	CB	2022	4	New York Jets

=== Active NFL ===
As of May 2026

- Corey Kiner, Arizona Cardinals
- Jared Bartlett, Carolina Panthers
- Coby Bryant, Chicago Bears
- Bryan Cook, Cincinnati Bengals
- Joe Royer, Cleveland Browns
- Josh Whyle, Green Bay Packers
- John Williams, Green Bay Packers
- Sauce Gardner, Indianapolis Colts
- Alec Pierce, Indianapolis Colts
- Cyrus Allen, Kansas City Chiefs
- Jeff Caldwell, Kansas City Chiefs
- Travis Kelce, Kansas City Chiefs
- Tyler Scott, Los Angeles Rams
- Tre Tucker, Las Vegas Raiders
- Gavin Gerhardt, Minnesota Vikings
- Jake Golday, Minnesota Vikings
- Ivan Pace Jr., Minnesota Vikings
- Eric Wilson, Minnesota Vikings
- James Hudson III, New England Patriots
- Lorenz Metz, New England Patriots
- Jowon Briggs, New York Jets
- Derrick Canteen, San Francisco 49ers
- Darrick Forrest, San Francisco 49ers
- Jerome Ford, Washington Commanders

== Nippert Stadium ==
Nippert has been home to the Bearcats football team in rudimentary form since 1901, and as a complete stadium since 1924, making it the fourth oldest playing site and fifth oldest stadium in college football. Nippert has earned a reputation as a tough place to play. One national columnist, visiting the sold-out Keg of Nails rivalry game in 2013, described Nippert Stadium as a "quaint bowl of angry noise sitting under the gaze of remarkable architecture" and went on to compare it to a "baby Death Valley" (referring to LSU's notoriously intimidating Tiger Stadium). In 2012, USA Today called Nippert Stadium the best football venue in what was then the Big East Conference. UC reeled off a 14-game home winning streak at Nippert, during a stretch dating from 2008 to 2010. UC then boasted a school record home winning streak of 32 games from the 2017 home finale against Connecticut to the 2022 home (and American Conference) finale against Tulane. The stadium received an $86 million renovation for the 2015 season, which was completed just in time for the Bearcats home opener on September 5. The Bearcats played their 2014 home games at Paul Brown Stadium.

== Future Big 12 opponents ==
On November 1, 2023, Cincinnati's Big 12 opponents from 2024 through 2027 were revealed.

2026	2027
Colorado	Houston
Kansas State	Kansas
Texas Tech	Oklahoma State
Utah	TCU
at Arizona	West Virginia
at BYU	at Arizona State
at Houston	at Baylor
at Iowa State	at Kansas State
at West Virginia	at UCF

== Future non-conference opponents ==
Announced schedules as of November 17, 2026.

2027	2028	2029	2030	2031	2032	2033
Central Connecticut	Boise State	at Boise State	Murray State	at Michigan State	Missouri	at Nebraska
Missouri State	Eastern Kentucky		Akron	at Army		
at Missouri	Eastern Michigan		Michigan State			
