= 1949 Xavier Musketeers football team =

American college football season

1949 Xavier Musketeers football

Salad Bowl champion

Salad Bowl, W 33–21 vs. Arizona State
- Conference: Independent
- Record: 10–1
- Head coach: Ed Kluska (3rd season)
- Home stadium: Xavier Stadium

1949 Midwestern college football independents records
| | Conf. | | | Overall |
| Team | W | L | T | W | | L | | T |
|---|---|---|---|---|---|---|---|---|
| No. 1 Notre Dame | | – | | 10 | – | 0 | – | 0 |
| Ball State | | – | | 8 | – | 0 | – | 0 |
| Xavier | | – | | 10 | – | 1 | – | 0 |
| Valparaiso | | – | | 8 | – | 1 | – | 1 |
| Washington University | | – | | 7 | – | 2 | – | 0 |
| Baldwin–Wallace | | – | | 6 | – | 2 | – | 0 |
| Wabash | | – | | 5 | – | 2 | – | 1 |
| Dayton | | – | | 6 | – | 3 | – | 0 |
| John Carroll | | – | | 6 | – | 3 | – | 0 |
| No. 19 Michigan State | | – | | 6 | – | 3 | – | 0 |
| Toledo | | – | | 6 | – | 4 | – | 0 |
| Michigan Tech | | – | | 4 | – | 3 | – | 0 |
| Youngstown | | – | | 4 | – | 3 | – | 1 |
| Bowling Green | | – | | 4 | – | 5 | – | 0 |
| Marquette | | – | | 4 | – | 5 | – | 0 |
| Central Michigan | | – | | 3 | – | 4 | – | 0 |
| Wayne | | – | | 3 | – | 5 | – | 0 |
| Indiana State | | – | | 1 | – | 9 | – | 0 |
| Michigan State Normal | | – | | 0 | – | 8 | – | 0 |
Rankings from AP Poll

The 1949 Xavier Musketeers football team was an American football team that represented Xavier University as an independent during the 1949 college football season. In its third season under head coach Ed Kluska, the team compiled a 10–1 record, defeated Arizona State in the 1950 Salad Bowl, and outscored all opponents by a total of 257 to 110. The team's only loss was to Bear Bryant's 1949 Kentucky Wildcats football team that was ranked No. 11 in the final AP Poll.

== Schedule ==
| Date | Opponent | Site | Result | Attendance | Source |
|---|---|---|---|---|---|
| September 16 | West Virginia Wesleyan | Xavier Stadium; Cincinnati, OH | W 53–0 | | |
| September 24 | at Dayton | UD Stadium; Dayton, OH | W 21–7 | 12,000 | |
| October 2 | Quantico Marines | Xavier Stadium; Cincinnati, OH | W 29–7 | 14,000 | |
| October 8 | at Miami (OH) | Miami Field; Oxford, OH | W 27–19 | 13,002 | |
| October 16 | John Carroll | Xavier Stadium; Cincinnati, OH | W 21–7 | 10,000 | |
| October 21 | at Louisville | duPont Manual Stadium; Louisville, KY | W 19–7 | | |
| October 30 | Dayton | Xavier Stadium; Cincinnati, OH | W 14–0 | 15,462 | |
| November 5 | No. 13 Kentucky | Xavier Stadium; Cincinnati, OH | L 7–21 | 16,348 | |
| November 12 | at Cincinnati | Nippert Stadium; Cincinnati, OH (rivalry) | W 20–14 | 27,000 | |
| November 24 | at Marshall | Fairfield Stadium; Huntington, WV | W 13–7 | 8,000 | |
| January 2, 1950 | vs. Arizona State | Montgomery Stadium; Phoenix, AZ (Salad Bowl) | W 33–21 | 18,500 | |
Rankings from AP Poll released prior to the game
