= 1949 Wheaton Crusaders football team =

American college football season

1949 Wheaton Crusaders football

CCI co-champion

Corn Bowl, L 0–13 vs. Western Illinois
- Conference: College Conference of Illinois
- Record: 8–2 (5–0 CCI)
- Head coach: Harvey Chrouser (6th season)
- Captains: Don Brinks; Wendy Loveless
- Home stadium: Lawson Field

1949 College Conference of Illinois football standings
	Conf.					Overall
Team	W		L		T	W		L		T
Wheaton (IL) +	5	–	0	–	0	8	–	2	–	0
Augustana (IL) +	5	–	0	–	0	6	–	2	–	0
Lake Forest	3	–	2	–	0	3	–	5	–	0
Illinois Wesleyan	2	–	2	–	0	4	–	5	–	0
Millikin	2	–	2	–	1	2	–	5	–	1
North Central (IL)	2	–	3	–	1	3	–	4	–	1
Illinois College	1	–	2	–	1	4	–	3	–	1
Carthage	1	–	4	–	1	2	–	6	–	1
Elmhurst	0	–	6	–	0	0	–	8	–	0
+ – Conference co-champions

The 1949 Wheaton Crusaders football team was an American football team that represented Wheaton College as a member of the College Conference of Illinois (CCI) during the 1949 college football season. Led by sixth-year head coach Harvey Chrouser, the Crusaders compiled an overall record of 8–2 with a mark of 5–0 in conference play, sharing the CCI title with Augustana. Wheaton was invited to the Corn Bowl, where the Crusaders lost to Western Illinois. Don Brinks and Wendy Loveless were the team's captains. Wheaton played home games at Lawson Field i Wheaton, Illinois.

== Schedule ==
Date	Time	Opponent	Site	Result	Attendance	Source
September 24		Aurora Clippers*	Wheaton, IL	W 12–6		
September 30		at Carthage	Carthage, IL	W 18–0		
October 8		Elmhurst	Lawson Field; Wheaton, IL	W 66–0	3,500	
October 15		Illinois Wesleyan^{†}	Wheaton, IL	W 12–7	3,500	
October 22		Lake Forest	Lake Forest, IL	W 19–7		
October 29		North Central (IL)	Lawson Field; Wheaton, IL	W 13–0		
November 5	2:00 p.m.	Valparaiso*	Brown Field; Valparaiso, IN	L 13–21		
November 12		Huntington*	Wheaton, IL	W 75–7	2,000	
November 19	1:30 p.m.	at Millikin	J.M.U. Field; Decatur, IL	W 26–19		
November 24	2:00 p.m.	vs. Western Illinois*	Wesleyan Field; Bloomington, IL (Corn Bowl)	L 0–13	4,567	
*Non-conference game; ^{†}Homecoming; All times are in Central time
