= 1949 Western Illinois Leathernecks football team =

American college football season

1949 Western Illinois Leathernecks football

IIAC champion

Corn Bowl, W 13–0 vs. Wheaton (IL)
- Conference: Illinois Intercollegiate Athletic Conference
- Record: 9–1 (4–0 IIAC)
- Head coach: Vince DiFrancesca (1st season)
- Home stadium: Morgan Field

1949 Illinois Intercollegiate Athletic Conference football standings
	Conf.					Overall
Team	W		L		T	W		L		T
Western Illinois $	4	–	0	–	0	9	–	1	–	0
Northern Illinois State	2	–	1	–	1	7	–	2	–	1
Eastern Illinois	2	–	2	–	0	3	–	5	–	0
Illinois State Normal	1	–	2	–	1	6	–	2	–	1
Southern Illinois	0	–	4	–	0	2	–	7	–	0
$ – Conference champion

The 1949 Western Illinois Leathernecks football team represented Western Illinois University as a member of the Illinois Intercollegiate Athletic Conference (IIAC) during the 1949 college football season. They were led by first-year head coach Vince DiFrancesca and played their home games at Morgan Field. The Leathernecks finished the season with a 9–1 record overall and a 4–0 record in conference play, winning the IIAC title. They were invited to the postseason Corn Bowl, where they defeated the Wheaton Crusaders, 13–0.

== Schedule ==
Date	Time	Opponent	Site	Result	Attendance	Source
September 24		at Michigan Tech*	Houghton, MI	W 33–0		
October 1		Wayne*	Morgan Field; Macomb, IL	L 14–33		
October 7		Millikin*	Morgan Field; Macomb, IL	W 32–20		
October 15		at Northern Illinois State	Dekalb Township High School football field; DeKalb, IL	W 27–6	3,000	
October 22		Illinois State Normal^{†}	Morgan Field; Macomb, IL	W 19–14	5,000	
October 29		at Shurtleff*	Alton, IL	W 68–0		
November 5		at Eastern Illinois	Lincoln Field; Charleston, IL	W 14–0		
November 12		Southern Illinois	Morgan Field; Macomb, IL	W 35–0		
November 18		Carthage*	Morgan Field; Macomb, IL	W 30–0		
November 24	2:00 p.m.	vs. Wheaton (IL)*	Wesleyan Field; Bloomington, IL (Corn Bowl)	W 13–0	4,567	
*Non-conference game; ^{†}Homecoming; All times are in Central time
