= 1949 Western Reserve Red Cats football team =

American college football season

1949 Western Reserve Red Cats football
- Conference: Mid-American Conference
- Record: 4–5–1 (1–3–1 MAC)
- Head coach: Mike Scarry (2nd season)
- Home stadium: League Park

1949 Mid-American Conference football standings
	Conf.					Overall
Team	W		L		T	W		L		T
Cincinnati $	4	–	0	–	0	7	–	4	–	0
Miami (OH)	3	–	1	–	0	5	–	4	–	0
Ohio	2	–	2	–	0	4	–	4	–	1
Western Michigan	2	–	3	–	0	4	–	4	–	0
Western Reserve	1	–	3	–	1	4	–	5	–	1
Butler	0	–	3	–	0	2	–	6	–	0
$ – Conference champion

The 1949 Western Reserve Red Cats football team represented the Western Reserve University in the American city of Cleveland, Ohio, now known as Case Western Reserve University, during the 1949 college football season. The Red Cats were a member of the Mid-American Conference (MAC).

The team was coached by Mike Scarry, a former Cleveland Browns player who played under and learned his coaching style from Paul Brown. Assistant coaches were Dick Luther and Lou Zontini.

1949 was the last season both Western Reserve University and Case Institute of Technology used League Park for their home football games, relocating to Shaw Stadium in 1950. In fact, the Thanksgiving Day rivalry game on November 24, 1949 was the final football game ever played at League Park.

== Schedule ==
Date	Time	Opponent	Site	TV	Result	Attendance	Source
September 23		at Kent State*	Memorial Field; Kent, OH		W 23–20		
October 1		Olivet*	Shaw Stadium; East Cleveland, OH		W 69–7		
October 8	3:00 p.m.	at Butler	Butler Bowl; Indianapolis, IN	WFBM-TV	W 28–6	5,000	
October 15		Ohio	League Park; Cleveland, OH		T 7–7		
October 22		at Cincinnati	Nippert Stadium; Cincinnati, OH		L 13–21		
October 29		Brown*	League Park; Cleveland, OH		L 14–28	6,000	
November 5		at Miami (OH)	Miami Field; Oxford, OH		L 7–46		
November 12		Western Michigan	League Park; Cleveland, OH		L 14–21	3,500	
November 19		West Virginia*	League Park; Cleveland, OH		L 20–28	1,000	
November 24		at Case Tech*	League Park; Cleveland, OH		W 30–0	12,500	
*Non-conference game; All times are in Eastern time
