= 1949 Northern Illinois State Huskies football team =

American college football season

1949 Northern Illinois State Huskies football
- Conference: Illinois Intercollegiate Athletic Conference
- Record: 7–2–1 (2–1–1 IIAC)
- Head coach: Chick Evans (21st season)
- Captain: Robert Fowlie
- Home stadium: Dekalb Township High School football field

1949 Illinois Intercollegiate Athletic Conference football standings
	Conf.					Overall
Team	W		L		T	W		L		T
Western Illinois $	4	–	0	–	0	9	–	1	–	0
Northern Illinois State	2	–	1	–	1	7	–	2	–	1
Eastern Illinois	2	–	2	–	0	3	–	5	–	0
Illinois State Normal	1	–	2	–	1	6	–	2	–	1
Southern Illinois	0	–	4	–	0	2	–	7	–	0
$ – Conference champion

The 1949 Northern Illinois State Huskies football team represented Northern Illinois State Teachers College—now known as Northern Illinois University—as a member of the Illinois Intercollegiate Athletic Conference (IIAC) during the 1949 college football season. Led by 21st-year head coach Chick Evans, the Huskies compiled an overall record of 7–2–1 with a mark of 2–1–1 in conference play, placing second in the IIAC. The team played home games at the Dekalb Township High School football field in DeKalb, Illinois.

== Schedule ==
Date	Time	Opponent	Site	Result	Attendance	Source
September 14	8:00 p.m.	at Aurora Clippers*	Glidden Field; Aurora, IL	W 21–0	3,000	
September 23		Washburn*	Dekalb Township High School football field; DeKalb, IL	W 40–27	3,000	
October 1		at Omaha*	Al F. Caniglia Field; Omaha, NE	W 27–8		
October 8		Michigan State Normal*^{†}	Dekalb Township High School football field; DeKalb, IL	W 39–14	7,000	
October 15		Western Illinois	Dekalb Township High School football field; DeKalb, IL	L 6–27	3,000	
October 22		at Illinois Wesleyan*	Bloomington, IL	W 47–25		
October 29		at Southern Illinois	McAndrew Stadium; Carbondale, IL	W 20–7		
November 5		at Illinois State Normal	McCormick Field; Normal, IL	T 14–14	6,000	
November 12		Eastern Illinois	DeKalb Township High School football field; DeKalb, IL	W 40–14	3,000	
November 18	8:00 p.m.	Kent State*	DeKalb Township High School football field; DeKalb, IL	L 19–21	3,000	
*Non-conference game; ^{†}Homecoming; All times are in Central time
