= 1949 Akron Zippers football team =

American college football season

1949 Akron Zippers football
- Conference: Ohio Athletic Conference
- Record: 2–6–1 (0–3–1 OAC)
- Head coach: William Houghton (2nd season)
- Captain: Tony Laterza
- Home stadium: Rubber Bowl

1949 Ohio Athletic Conference football standings
	Conf.					Overall
Team	W		L		T	W		L		T
Muskingum $	7	–	0	–	0	8	–	1	–	0
Ohio Wesleyan	4	–	0	–	0	7	–	2	–	0
Kent State	2	–	0	–	0	5	–	3	–	0
Heidelberg	4	–	1	–	0	8	–	1	–	0
Denison	4	–	2	–	0	5	–	3	–	0
Wooster	4	–	3	–	1	5	–	3	–	1
Otterbein	2	–	3	–	0	5	–	3	–	0
Mount Union	2	–	3	–	0	3	–	6	–	0
Wittenberg	2	–	3	–	0	2	–	7	–	0
Capital	2	–	5	–	0	2	–	6	–	0
Oberlin	1	–	5	–	0	2	–	6	–	0
Akron	0	–	3	–	1	2	–	6	–	1
Marietta	0	–	2	–	0	2	–	6	–	0
Kenyon	0	–	4	–	0	0	–	6	–	0
$ – Conference champion

The 1949 Akron Zippers football team was an American football team that represented the University of Akron in the Ohio Athletic Conference (OAC) during the 1949 college football season. In its second season under head coach William Houghton, the team compiled a 2–6–1 record (0–3–1 against OAC opponents) and was outscored by a total of 257 to 114. Tony Laterza was the team captain. The team played its home games at the Rubber Bowl in Akron, Ohio.

== Schedule ==
Date	Opponent	Site	Result	Attendance	Source
September 24	Findlay*	Rubber Bowl; Akron, OH	W 34–0	5,722	
October 1	at Michigan State Normal*	Briggs Field; Ypsilanti, MI	W 20–6		
October 8	Baldwin–Wallace*	Rubber Bowl; Akron, OH	L 7–45		
October 15	at Louisville*	duPont Manual Stadium; Louisville, KY	L 6–62		
October 22	Mount Union	Rubber Bowl; Akron, OH	L 14–23		
October 29	at Wooster	Wooster, OH	T 13–13		
November 5	Geneva*	Rubber Bowl; Akron, OH	L 6–27		
November 12	at Kent State	Memorial Stadium; Kent, OH (Wagon Wheel)	L 0–47		
November 19	at Heidelberg	Tiffin, OH	L 14–34		
*Non-conference game
