= 1949 Michigan State Normal Hurons football team =

American college football season

1949 Michigan State Normal Hurons football
- Conference: Independent
- Record: 0–8
- Head coach: Harry Ockerman (1st season)
- Captains: Jack B. VanWagoner; Theodore D. Bott
- Home stadium: Briggs Field

1949 Midwestern college football independents records
| | Conf. | | | Overall |
| Team | W | L | T | W | | L | | T |
|---|---|---|---|---|---|---|---|---|
| No. 1 Notre Dame | | – | | 10 | – | 0 | – | 0 |
| Ball State | | – | | 8 | – | 0 | – | 0 |
| Xavier | | – | | 10 | – | 1 | – | 0 |
| Valparaiso | | – | | 8 | – | 1 | – | 1 |
| Washington University | | – | | 7 | – | 2 | – | 0 |
| Baldwin–Wallace | | – | | 6 | – | 2 | – | 0 |
| Wabash | | – | | 5 | – | 2 | – | 1 |
| Dayton | | – | | 6 | – | 3 | – | 0 |
| John Carroll | | – | | 6 | – | 3 | – | 0 |
| No. 19 Michigan State | | – | | 6 | – | 3 | – | 0 |
| Toledo | | – | | 6 | – | 4 | – | 0 |
| Michigan Tech | | – | | 4 | – | 3 | – | 0 |
| Youngstown | | – | | 4 | – | 3 | – | 1 |
| Bowling Green | | – | | 4 | – | 5 | – | 0 |
| Marquette | | – | | 4 | – | 5 | – | 0 |
| Central Michigan | | – | | 3 | – | 4 | – | 0 |
| Wayne | | – | | 3 | – | 5 | – | 0 |
| Indiana State | | – | | 1 | – | 9 | – | 0 |
| Michigan State Normal | | – | | 0 | – | 8 | – | 0 |
Rankings from AP Poll

The 1949 Michigan State Normal Hurons football team represented Michigan State Normal College (later renamed Eastern Michigan University) as an independent during the 1949 college football season. In their first season under head coach Harry Ockerman, the Hurons compiled a 0–8 record and were outscored 180–61 by their opponents. Jack B. VanWagoner and Theodore D. Bott were the team captains.

Ockerman was hired as the school's head football coach in August 1949. He had played football, basketball and baseball at the school from 1924 to 1927. He replaced Elton Rynearson who had been the school's head football coach for more than 25 years. Rynearson continued to serve as the school's athletic director.

== Schedule ==
| Date | Opponent | Site | Result | Attendance | Source |
|---|---|---|---|---|---|
| September 24 | at Northern Michigan | Marquette, MI | L 0–6 | | |
| October 1 | Akron | Briggs Field; Ypsilanti, MI | L 6–20 | | |
| October 8 | at Northern Illinois State | Dekalb Township High School football field; DeKalb, IL | L 14–39 | 7,000 | |
| October 15 | Ball State | Briggs Field; Ypsilanti, MI | L 2–33 | | |
| October 21 | Eastern Kentucky | Briggs Field; Ypsilanti, MI | L 6–27 | | |
| October 29 | Hope^{†} | Briggs Field; Ypsilanti, MI | L 6–16 | | |
| November 4 | at Central Michigan | Mount Pleasant, MI (rivalry) | L 7–18 | | |
| November 12 | at Valparaiso | Valparaiso, IN | L 26–28 | | |
^{†}Homecoming
