= 1949 Notre Dame Fighting Irish football team =

American college football season

1949 Notre Dame Fighting Irish football

AP Poll national champion
- Conference: Independent

Ranking
- AP: No. 1
- Record: 10–0
- Head coach: Frank Leahy (7th season)
- Offensive scheme: T formation
- Captains: Leon Hart; Jim Martin
- Home stadium: Notre Dame Stadium

1949 Midwestern college football independents records
	Conf.			Overall
Team	W	L	T	W		L		T
No. 1 Notre Dame		–		10	–	0	–	0
Ball State		–		8	–	0	–	0
Xavier		–		10	–	1	–	0
Valparaiso		–		8	–	1	–	1
Washington University		–		7	–	2	–	0
Baldwin–Wallace		–		6	–	2	–	0
Wabash		–		5	–	2	–	1
Dayton		–		6	–	3	–	0
John Carroll		–		6	–	3	–	0
No. 19 Michigan State		–		6	–	3	–	0
Toledo		–		6	–	4	–	0
Michigan Tech		–		4	–	3	–	0
Youngstown		–		4	–	3	–	1
Bowling Green		–		4	–	5	–	0
Marquette		–		4	–	5	–	0
Central Michigan		–		3	–	4	–	0
Wayne		–		3	–	5	–	0
Indiana State		–		1	–	9	–	0
Michigan State Normal		–		0	–	8	–	0
Rankings from AP Poll

The 1949 Notre Dame Fighting Irish football team represented the University of Notre Dame during the 1949 college football season. The Irish, coached by Frank Leahy, ended the season with 10 wins and no losses, winning the national championship. The 1949 team became the seventh Irish team to win the national title and the third in four years. Led by Heisman winner Leon Hart, the Irish outscored their opponents 360–86. The 1949 team is the last team in what is considered to be the Notre Dame Football dynasty, a stretch of games in which Notre Dame went 36–0–2 and won three national championships and two Heisman Trophies. The Irish squad was cited by Sports Illustrated as the part of the second-best sports dynasty (professional or collegiate) of the 20th century and second greatest college football dynasty.

== Schedule ==
Date	Opponent	Rank	Site	Result	Attendance	Source
September 24	Indiana		Notre Dame Stadium; Notre Dame, IN	W 49–6	53,844	
October 1	at Washington		Husky Stadium; Seattle, WA	W 27–7	41,500	
October 8	at Purdue	No. 2	Ross–Ade Stadium; West Lafayette, IN (rivalry)	W 35–12	52,000	
October 15	No. 4 Tulane	No. 1	Notre Dame Stadium; Notre Dame, IN	W 46–7	58,196	
October 29	vs. Navy	No. 1	Memorial Stadium; Baltimore, MD (rivalry)	W 40–0	62,000	
November 5	at No. 10 Michigan State	No. 1	Macklin Stadium; East Lansing, MI (rivalry)	W 34–21	51,277	
November 12	vs. North Carolina	No. 1	Yankee Stadium; Bronx, NY (rivalry)	W 42–6	67,000	
November 19	Iowa	No. 1	Notre Dame Stadium; Notre Dame, IN	W 28–7	56,790	
November 26	No. 17 USC	No. 1	Notre Dame Stadium; Notre Dame, IN (rivalry)	W 32–0	57,214	
December 3	at SMU	No. 1	Cotton Bowl; Dallas, TX	W 27–20	75,457	
Rankings from AP Poll released prior to the game

== Rankings ==
Ranking movements Legend: ██ Increase in ranking ██ Decrease in ranking ( ) = First-place votes
	Week								
Poll	1	2	3	4	5	6	7	8	Final
AP	2 (15)	1 (67)	1 (146)	1 (120)	1 (133)	1 (137)	1 (140)	1 (113)	1 (172)

== Personnel ==
=== Depth chart ===
POS	Name	Name	Name	Name
QB	Bob Williams	John Mazur	Bill Whiteside	
LHB	Frank Spaniel	Ernie Zalejski	Bill Gay	Leo McKillip
RHB	Larry Coutre	Billy Barrett	Dick Cotter	
FB	Emil Sitko	Jack Landry	Del Gander	
LE	Bill Wightkin	Jim Mutscheller	Doug Waybright	
LT	Jim Martin	Al Zmijewski	John Zancha	
LG	Frank Johnson	Paul Burns	Art Perry	
C	Walt Grothaus	Jim Hamby		
RG	Bob Lally	Fred Wallner	Bill Higgins	
RT	Ralph McGehee	Gus Cifelli	John Nusskern	
RE	Leon Hart	Ray Espenan	Chet Ostrowski	

=== Coaching staff ===
Head coach: Frank Leahy

Assistants: Bernie Crimmins (first assistant / backfield), John F. Druze (chief scout), Bill Earley (backfield), Joe McArdle (guards), Robert McBride (tackles), Fred Miller (volunteer assistant), Benjamin Sheridan (freshmen)

== Postseason ==
=== Award winners ===
- Leon Hart - Heisman Trophy, Maxwell Award

Heisman voting:

Leon Hart, 1st
Bob Williams, 5th
Emil Sitko, 8th

All-Americans
Name	AP	UP	NEA	INS	COL	AA	SN	L
† Emil Sitko, FB	1	1	1	1	1	1	1	1
† Leon Hart, E	1	1	1	1	1	1	1	1
Bob Williams, QB	2	1				1	1	1
Jim Martin, T	1	2	1	1			2	2
† denotes unanimous selection

College Football Hall of Fame Inductees
Name	Position	Year Inducted
Jerry Groom	Center	1994
Leon Hart	End	1973
Frank Leahy	Coach	1970
Jim Martin	End/Tackle	1995
Emil "Red" Sitko	Halfback/Fullback	1984
Bob Williams	Quarterback	1988

Notre Dame leads all universities in players inducted.

=== 1950 NFL draft ===
The following players were drafted into professional football following the season.

Player	Position	Round	Pick	Franchise
Leon Hart	End	1	1	Detroit Lions
Jim Martin	Guard	2	26	Cleveland Browns
Larry Coutre	Halfback	4	43	Green Bay Packers
Mike Swistowicz	Halfback	5	55	New York Yanks
Frank Spaniel	Halfback	5	58	Washington Redskins
Ernie Zalejski	Defensive Back	5	62	Chicago Bears
