= 1949 Miami Redskins football team =

American college football season

1949 Miami Redskins football
- Conference: Mid-American Conference
- Record: 5–4 (3–1 MAC)
- Head coach: Woody Hayes (1st season)
- Captain: Ernie Plank
- Home stadium: Miami Field

1949 Mid-American Conference football standings
	Conf.					Overall
Team	W		L		T	W		L		T
Cincinnati $	4	–	0	–	0	7	–	4	–	0
Miami (OH)	3	–	1	–	0	5	–	4	–	0
Ohio	2	–	2	–	0	4	–	4	–	1
Western Michigan	2	–	3	–	0	4	–	4	–	0
Western Reserve	1	–	3	–	1	4	–	5	–	1
Butler	0	–	3	–	0	2	–	6	–	0
$ – Conference champion

The 1949 Miami Redskins football team was an American football team that represented Miami University during the 1949 college football season. In their first season under head coach Woody Hayes, the Redskins compiled a 5–4 record and outscored all opponents by a combined total of 251 to 163. Bo Schembechler played at the tackle position on the team.

== Schedule ==
Date	Opponent	Site	Result	Attendance	Source
September 24	at Wichita*	Veterans Field; Wichita, KS	W 23–6		
October 1	at Virginia*	Scott Stadium; Charlottesville, VA	L 18–21	13,000	
October 8	Xavier*	Miami Field; Oxford, OH	L 19–27	13,002	
October 15	at No. 15 Pittsburgh*	Pitt Stadium; Pittsburgh, PA	L 26–35	20,893	
October 22	Ohio	Miami Field; Oxford, OH (rivalry)	W 26–0		
October 29	at Western Michigan	Waldo Stadium; Kalamazoo, MI	W 34–20		
November 5	Western Reserve	Miami Field; Oxford, OH	W 46–7		
November 12	Dayton*	Miami Field; Oxford, OH	W 53–20	11,376	
November 24	at Cincinnati	Nippert Stadium; Cincinnati, OH (rivalry)	L 5–27		
*Non-conference game; Rankings from AP Poll released prior to the game
