= 1958 Wheaton Crusaders football team =

American college football season

1958 Wheaton Crusaders football

CCI champion
- Conference: College Conference of Illinois
- Record: 8–0 (7–0 CCI)
- Head coach: Harvey Chrouser (15th season)
- Captains: Bob Bakke; Bill Hoppel
- Home stadium: McCully Field

1958 College Conference of Illinois football standings
	Conf.					Overall
Team	W		L		T	W		L		T
Wheaton (IL) $	7	–	0	–	0	8	–	0	–	0
Carroll (WI)	5	–	2	–	0	6	–	2	–	0
North Central (IL)	5	–	2	–	0	6	–	3	–	0
Lake Forest	4	–	3	–	0	5	–	3	–	0
Illinois Wesleyan	4	–	3	–	0	4	–	4	–	0
Millikin	2	–	5	–	0	2	–	6	–	0
Augustana (IL)	2	–	6	–	0	1	–	7	–	0
Elmhurst	0	–	7	–	0	0	–	8	–	0
$ – Conference champion

The 1958 Wheaton Crusaders football team was an American football team that represented Wheaton College as a member of the College Conference of Illinois (CCI) during the 1958 college football season. In their 15th year under head coach Harvey Chrouser, the Crusaders compiled a perfect 8–0 record (7–0 in conference games), won the CCI championship, and outscored opponents by a total of 357 to 70. It was Wheaton's seventh consecutive CCI championship.

The team led the country's small colleges in total offense with an average of 466 yards per game. It also set a single-game CCI record by scoring 90 points on 12 touchdowns against Elmhurst. The prior record was 81 points by both teams.

Senior quarterback Bruce Anderson was selected as Wheaton's most valuable player. He set a new Wheaton record by completing 33 of 58 passes for 638 yards and nine touchowns. Senior tackle Bob Bakke was selected as a first-team player on the 1958 Little All-America college football team.

Wheaton players were selected by the conference coaches to fill ten spots on the first team of the 1958 All-CCI football team: Don Branda (halfback on offense, defense at back); fullback Steve Murray; end (offense) Dick Foushee; guard (offense) Al Seeland; tackle (offense) Dick Plaep; end (defense) Bill Hoppel; tackle (defense) Bob Bakke; linebacker Skippy Meier; and back Bruce Whipple (defense).

Bob Bakke and Bill Hoppel were Wheaton's co-captains.

The team played its home games at McCully Field in Wheaton, Illinois.

== Schedule ==
Date	Opponent	Site	Result	Attendance	Source
September 19	Northern Illinois*	McCully Field; Wheaton, IL	W 40–20		
September 27	Lake Forest	McCully Field; Wheaton, IL	W 48–0		
October 4	at Augustana (IL)	Rock Island, IL	W 67–12		
October 11	Elmhurst	McCully Field; Wheaton, IL	W 90–6		
October 18	at Millikin	Millikin Field; Decatur, IL	W 26–0		
October 25	at Carroll (WI)	Waukesha, WI	W 16–12		
November 1	North Central (IL)^{†}	McCully Field; Wheaton, IL	W 33–6	6,500	
November 8	at Illinois Wesleyan	Bloomington, IL	W 37–14		
*Non-conference game; ^{†}Homecoming
