= 1949 Washington University Bears football team =

American college football season

1949 Washington University Bears football
- Conference: Independent
- Record: 7–2
- Head coach: Irwin Uteritz (1st season)
- Home stadium: Francis Field

1949 Midwestern college football independents records
	Conf.			Overall
Team	W	L	T	W		L		T
No. 1 Notre Dame		–		10	–	0	–	0
Ball State		–		8	–	0	–	0
Xavier		–		10	–	1	–	0
Valparaiso		–		8	–	1	–	1
Washington University		–		7	–	2	–	0
Baldwin–Wallace		–		6	–	2	–	0
Wabash		–		5	–	2	–	1
Dayton		–		6	–	3	–	0
John Carroll		–		6	–	3	–	0
No. 19 Michigan State		–		6	–	3	–	0
Toledo		–		6	–	4	–	0
Michigan Tech		–		4	–	3	–	0
Youngstown		–		4	–	3	–	1
Bowling Green		–		4	–	5	–	0
Marquette		–		4	–	5	–	0
Central Michigan		–		3	–	4	–	0
Wayne		–		3	–	5	–	0
Indiana State		–		1	–	9	–	0
Michigan State Normal		–		0	–	8	–	0
Rankings from AP Poll

The 1949 Washington University Bears football team represented Washington University in St. Louis as an independent during the 1949 college football season. Led by first-year head coach Irwin Uteritz, the Bears compiled a record of 7–2. Washington University played home games at Francis Field in St. Louis.

== Schedule ==
Date	Time	Opponent	Site	Result	Attendance	Source
September 24	2:00 p.m.	Missouri Mines	Francis Field; St. Louis, MO	W 28–13	7,000	
October 1	2:00 p.m.	Memphis State	Francis Field; St. Louis, MO	L 0–34	6,500	
October 8		at Illinois Wesleyan	Bloomington, IL	W 41–25		
October 15		at Western Michigan	Waldo Stadium; Kalamazoo, MI	W 12–0		
October 22	2:00 p.m.	Butler	Francis Field; St. Louis, MO	W 7–0	5,500	
October 29	2:00 p.m.	Colorado College	Francis Field; St. Louis, MO	W 27–0		
November 5	2:00 p.m.	Rollins^{†}	Francis Field; St. Louis, MO	W 21–0	7,500	
November 12	2:00 p.m.	at Louisville	duPont Manual Stadium; Louisville, KY	L 12–35	9,000	
November 19	2:00 p.m.	Sewanee	Francis Field; St. Louis, MO	W 19–7	5,000	
^{†}Homecoming; All times are in Central time
