= 1949 Kent State Golden Flashes football team =

American college football season

1949 Kent State Golden Flashes football
- Conference: Ohio Athletic Conference
- Record: 5–3 (2–0 OAC)
- Head coach: Trevor J. Rees (4th season)
- Home stadium: Memorial Stadium

1949 Ohio Athletic Conference football standings
	Conf.					Overall
Team	W		L		T	W		L		T
Muskingum $	7	–	0	–	0	8	–	1	–	0
Ohio Wesleyan	4	–	0	–	0	7	–	2	–	0
Kent State	2	–	0	–	0	5	–	3	–	0
Heidelberg	4	–	1	–	0	8	–	1	–	0
Denison	4	–	2	–	0	5	–	3	–	0
Wooster	4	–	3	–	1	5	–	3	–	1
Otterbein	2	–	3	–	0	5	–	3	–	0
Mount Union	2	–	3	–	0	3	–	6	–	0
Wittenberg	2	–	3	–	0	2	–	7	–	0
Capital	2	–	5	–	0	2	–	6	–	0
Oberlin	1	–	5	–	0	2	–	6	–	0
Akron	0	–	3	–	1	2	–	6	–	1
Marietta	0	–	2	–	0	2	–	6	–	0
Kenyon	0	–	4	–	0	0	–	6	–	0
$ – Conference champion

The 1949 Kent State Golden Flashes football team was an American football team that represented Kent State University in the Ohio Athletic Conference (OAC) during the 1949 college football season. In its fourth season under head coach Trevor J. Rees, Kent State compiled a 5–3 record.

== Schedule ==
Date	Time	Opponent	Site	Result	Attendance	Source
September 23		Western Reserve*	Memorial Stadium; Kent, OH	L 20–23		
September 30		Mount Union	Memorial Stadium; Kent, OH	W 13–11		
October 7		at Ohio*	Peden Stadium; Athens, OH	L 6–34		
October 14		Central Michigan*	Memorial Stadium; Kent, OH	W 26–12		
October 29		Connecticut*	Memorial Stadium; Kent, OH	W 27–0		
November 5		at Bowling Green*	Bowling Green, OH (rivalry)	L 6–19	6,898	
November 12		Akron	Memorial Stadium; Kent, OH (Wagon Wheel)	W 47–0		
November 18	9:00 p.m.	at Northern Illinois*	Dekalb Township High School football field; DeKalb, IL	W 21–19	3,000	
*Non-conference game; All times are in Eastern time
