= 1949 Marquette Hilltoppers football team =

American college football season

1949 Marquette Hilltoppers football
- Conference: Independent
- Record: 4–5
- Head coach: Frank Murray (19th season)
- Home stadium: Marquette Stadium

1949 Midwestern college football independents records
	Conf.			Overall
Team	W	L	T	W		L		T
No. 1 Notre Dame		–		10	–	0	–	0
Ball State		–		8	–	0	–	0
Xavier		–		10	–	1	–	0
Valparaiso		–		8	–	1	–	1
Washington University		–		7	–	2	–	0
Baldwin–Wallace		–		6	–	2	–	0
Wabash		–		5	–	2	–	1
Dayton		–		6	–	3	–	0
John Carroll		–		6	–	3	–	0
No. 19 Michigan State		–		6	–	3	–	0
Toledo		–		6	–	4	–	0
Michigan Tech		–		4	–	3	–	0
Youngstown		–		4	–	3	–	1
Bowling Green		–		4	–	5	–	0
Marquette		–		4	–	5	–	0
Central Michigan		–		3	–	4	–	0
Wayne		–		3	–	5	–	0
Indiana State		–		1	–	9	–	0
Michigan State Normal		–		0	–	8	–	0
Rankings from AP Poll

The 1949 Marquette Hilltoppers football team was an American football team that represented Marquette University as an independent during the 1949 college football season. In its 19th and final season under head coach Frank Murray, the team compiled a 4–5 record and outscored all opponents by a total of 257 to 209. The team played its home games at Marquette Stadium in Milwaukee.

== Schedule ==
Date	Opponent	Site	Result	Attendance	Source
September 17	North Dakota State	Marquette Stadium; Milwaukee, WI	W 66–0	14,000	
September 24	at Wisconsin	Camp Randall Stadium; Madison, WI	L 0–41		
October 1	at Michigan State	Macklin Stadium; East Lansing, MI	L 7–48	29,992	
October 8	Saint Louis	Marquette Stadium; Milwaukee, WI	W 62–7		
October 15	Detroit	Marquette Stadium; Milwaukee, WI	W 24–14	15,000	
October 29	Colorado State–Greeley	Marquette Stadium; Milwaukee, WI	W 68–13		
November 5	South Carolina^{†}	Marquette Stadium; Milwaukee, WI	L 3–6	15,000	
November 12	at Purdue	Ross–Ade Stadium; West Lafayette, IN	L 7–41	28,000	
November 20	at San Francisco	Kezar Stadium; San Francisco, CA	L 20–39	12,000	
^{†}Homecoming
