= 1949 Eastern Illinois Panthers football team =

American college football season

1949 Eastern Illinois Panthers football
- Conference: Illinois Intercollegiate Athletic Conference
- Record: 3–5 (2–2 IIAC)
- Head coach: Maynard O'Brien (4th season)
- Home stadium: Lincoln Field

1949 Illinois Intercollegiate Athletic Conference football standings
	Conf.					Overall
Team	W		L		T	W		L		T
Western Illinois $	4	–	0	–	0	9	–	1	–	0
Northern Illinois State	2	–	1	–	1	7	–	2	–	1
Eastern Illinois	2	–	2	–	0	3	–	5	–	0
Illinois State Normal	1	–	2	–	1	6	–	2	–	1
Southern Illinois	0	–	4	–	0	2	–	7	–	0
$ – Conference champion

The 1949 Eastern Illinois Panthers football team represented Eastern Illinois University as a member of the Illinois Intercollegiate Athletic Conference (IIAC) during the 1949 college football season. The team was led by fourth-year head coach Maynard O'Brien and played their home games at Lincoln Field in Charleston, Illinois. The Panthers finished the season with a 3–5 record overall and a 2–2 record in conference play.

== Schedule ==
Date	Opponent	Site	Result	Attendance	Source
September 24	Quincy*	Lincoln Field; Charleston, IL	L 13–19		
October 1	at Saint Joseph's (IN)*	Rensselaer, IN	L 6–12		
October 8	Illinois State Normal	Lincoln Field; Charleston, IL (rivalry)	W 7–6		
October 22	at Southern Illinois	McAndrew Stadium; Carbondale, IL	W 26–13	10,000	
October 29	Indiana State*	Lincoln Field; Carbondale, IL	W 33–0		
November 5	Western Illinois	Lincoln Field; Carbondale, IL	L 0–14		
November 12	at Northern Illinois State	Dekalb Township High School football field; DeKalb, IL	L 14–40	3,000	
November 19	at Ball State*	Muncie, IN	L 13–47		
*Non-conference game
