= 1949 Cincinnati Bearcats football team =

American college football season

1949 Cincinnati Bearcats football

MAC champion

Glass Bowl, W 33–13 vs. Toledo
- Conference: Mid-American Conference
- Record: 7–4 (4–0 MAC)
- Head coach: Sid Gillman (1st season)
- Captain: Thurman Owens
- Home stadium: Nippert Stadium

1949 Mid-American Conference football standings
| | Conf. | | | | | Overall |
| Team | W | | L | | T | W | | L | | T |
|---|---|---|---|---|---|---|---|---|---|---|
| Cincinnati $ | 4 | – | 0 | – | 0 | 7 | – | 4 | – | 0 |
| Miami (OH) | 3 | – | 1 | – | 0 | 5 | – | 4 | – | 0 |
| Ohio | 2 | – | 2 | – | 0 | 4 | – | 4 | – | 1 |
| Western Michigan | 2 | – | 3 | – | 0 | 4 | – | 4 | – | 0 |
| Western Reserve | 1 | – | 3 | – | 1 | 4 | – | 5 | – | 1 |
| Butler | 0 | – | 3 | – | 0 | 2 | – | 6 | – | 0 |
$ – Conference champion

The 1949 Cincinnati Bearcats football team was an American football team that represented the University of Cincinnati as a member of the Mid-American Conference (MAC) during the 1949 college football season. Led by first-year head coach Sid Gillman, the Bearcats compiled an overall record of 7–4 with a mark of 4–0 in conference play, winning the MAC title. Cincinnati was invited to the Glass Bowl, where the Bearcats defeated Toledo.

== Schedule ==
| Date | Opponent | Site | Result | Attendance | Source |
|---|---|---|---|---|---|
| September 17 | Nevada* | Nippert Stadium; Cincinnati, OH | L 21–41 | | |
| September 24 | Hardin–Simmons* | Nippert Stadium; Cincinnati, OH | W 27–21 | | |
| October 1 | at Pacific (CA)* | Pacific Memorial Stadium; Stockton, CA | L 7–34 | | |
| October 8 | Western Michigan | Nippert Stadium; Cincinnati, OH | W 27–6 | | |
| October 15 | Mississippi State*^{†} | Nippert Stadium; Cincinnati, OH | W 19–0 | | |
| October 22 | Western Reserve | Nippert Stadium; Cincinnati, OH | W 21–13 | | |
| October 29 | at No. 14 Kentucky* | McLean Stadium; Lexington, KY | L 7–14 | | |
| November 5 | at Ohio | Peden Stadium; Athens, OH | W 34–13 | | |
| November 18 | Xavier* | Nippert Stadium; Cincinnati, OH (rivalry) | L 14–20 | 27,000 | |
| November 24 | Miami (OH) | Nippert Stadium; Cincinnati, OH (Victory Bell) | W 27–6 | | |
| December 3 | at Toledo* | Glass Bowl; Toledo, OH (Glass Bowl) | W 33–13 | | |
*Non-conference game; ^{†}Homecoming; Rankings from AP Poll released prior to the game
