= Emil Sitko =

American football player (1923–1973)

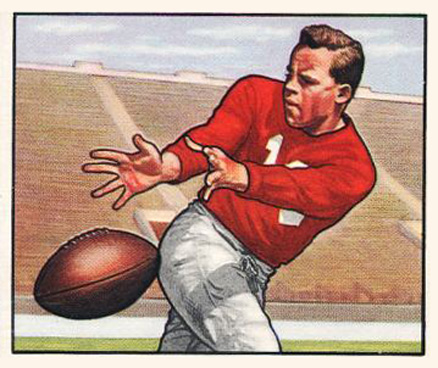
- Sitko on a 1950 Bowman football card

No. 82, 24
- Positions: Halfback, fullback

Personal information
- Born: September 7, 1923; Fort Wayne, Indiana, U.S.
- Died: December 15, 1973 (aged 50); Fort Wayne, Indiana, U.S.
- Listed height: 5 ft 8 in (1.73 m)
- Listed weight: 183 lb (83 kg)

Career information
- High school: Central (IN)
- College: Notre Dame
- NFL draft: 1946: 1st round, 10th overall pick

Career history
- San Francisco 49ers (1950); Chicago Cardinals (1951–1952)

Awards and highlights
- 3× National champion (1946, 1947, 1949); 2× Consensus All-American (1948, 1949); National Polish-American Sports Hall of Fame (2020)

Career NFL statistics
- Rushing yards: 636
- Rushing average: 3.9
- Receptions: 9
- Receiving yards: 87
- Total touchdowns: 3
- Stats at Pro Football Reference
- College Football Hall of Fame

Emil Martin "Red" Sitko (September 7, 1923 – December 15, 1973) was an American professional football player.

Born in Fort Wayne, Indiana on September 7, 1923. He was of Polish descent. He earned the nickname of "Red" due to his red hair. He attended Central High School in Fort Wayne. At only 5'8" and 180 pounds he was not considered a big man. "Emil wasn't very big as football players go -- even for those days", Irish coach Frank Leahy once said. "But he was the fastest starting back I ever coached."

Emil Sitko served in a military capacity during World War II and did not enter directly into college. While in the military, Sitko made a name for himself on the Great Lakes Navy football team, where, in 1943, he scored a touchdown and had an interception against a previously undefeated Notre Dame team. Upon coming out of service in World War II, he enrolled at Notre Dame as a 23-year-old freshman. He was a starter on the football team three years at right half and one year at fullback from 1946 to 1949. In those four years the Notre Dame record was 36–0–2. Besides his nickname of "Red", he was known in football as "Six- Yard Sitko." He led his team in rushing all four years and his career average was 6.1 yards a try. In 1949, he also led the team in kickoff returns, averaging 22 yards. He made the All-America teams of the Sporting News and the Football Writers Association of America in 1948 and was unanimous All-America in 1949. Emil also finished eighth in the 1949 Heisman Trophy voting behind teammate Leon Hart. Sitko still stands seventh on Notre Dame's career rushing charts.

Sitko played three seasons in the NFL for the San Francisco 49ers and the Chicago Cardinals before retiring and returning to his hometown to work in the auto sales business. He died in 1973, at age 50, after a heart attack. He was inducted into the College Football Hall of Fame in 1984 and National Polish-American Sports Hall of Fame in 2020.
