= Lee Pete =

American sports broadcaster (1924–2010)

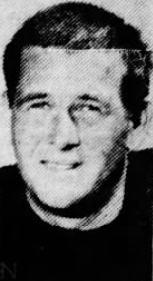
- Pete c. 1950
- Born: November 14, 1924; Toledo, Ohio, U.S.
- Died: March 25, 2010 (aged 85); Toledo, Ohio, U.S.
- Occupation: Sports talk radio broadcaster
- Football career

Profile
- Position: Quarterback

Personal information
- Listed height: 6 ft 1 in (1.85 m)
- Listed weight: 210 lb (95 kg)

Career information
- High school: Libbey (Toledo)
- College: Toledo
- NFL draft: 1950: undrafted

Career history
- Detroit Lions (1950)*; Green Bay Packers (1950)*
- * Offseason or practice squad member only

Leeland C. Pete (November 14, 1924 – March 25, 2010) was an American sports-talk radio broadcaster. He played college football as a quarterback for the Toledo Rockets. He became a sports talk show host on KDWN in Las Vegas. His Stardust Line show became the longest-running sports betting show in the history of radio.

== Early life and football career ==
Pete was born in Toledo, Ohio, where he attended Libbey High School. After serving as an Army Air Force pilot in World War II, he enrolled at the University of Toledo. Pete was the Rockets football team's quarterback. He helped lead them to three Glass Bowl victories, earning most valuable player honors in the 1948 contest after completing 22 of 27 passes for three touchdowns. He set a single-season school record with 1,201 yards of total offense in 11 games in 1947, which stood until 1964, when it was broken by Dan Simrell with 1,616 yards. Pete also played for their baseball team as an outfielder. He was inducted into the school's Varsity T Hall of Fame in 1986.

Standing at 6 feet 1 inch (1.85 m) and 210 pounds (95 kg), Pete tried out unsuccessfully with the Detroit Lions and Green Bay Packers of the National Football League in 1950. In 1963, he signed with the Toledo Tornadoes of the United Football League to be their offensive backfield coach.

== Radio career ==
In 1954, Pete began his sports radio career at a small station in his hometown of Toledo, Ohio. After moving to Las Vegas in 1970, he established a sports talk radio show on KDWN in 1981. The 50,000-watt station had a night signal that was heard as far north as British Columbia, south to Mexico, east to the Plains, and west to some islands in the Pacific Ocean. The show reached about 10 U.S. states. Pete's Stardust Line show ran nightly from 10 until midnight. He originally bought airtime from the station for the weekends, and eventually sold enough advertising to expand the show to seven days a week. It became the longest-running sports betting show in the history of radio. The Daily Press wrote that one of his "most valuable talents is his ability to ask the 'stupid question'—the answer to which nobody knows, but which everyboy assumes is obvious".

Pete also hosted a televised sports handicapping show, Proline, on cable television that was viewed in over 30 million homes. He finished his career at KRLV, retiring in 2002.

== Health ==
Pete was diagnosed with amyotrophic lateral sclerosis, a.k.a. Lou Gehrig's disease, in 2005. He died in Toledo on March 25, 2010. He was 85.
