= 1949 Toledo Rockets football team =

American college football season

1949 Toledo Rockets football

Glass Bowl, L 13–33 vs. Cincinnati
- Conference: Independent
- Record: 6–4
- Head coach: Skip Stahley (2nd season)
- Captains: Ed Burrus; George Miley
- Home stadium: Glass Bowl

1949 Midwestern college football independents records
| | Conf. | | | Overall |
| Team | W | L | T | W | | L | | T |
|---|---|---|---|---|---|---|---|---|
| No. 1 Notre Dame | | – | | 10 | – | 0 | – | 0 |
| Ball State | | – | | 8 | – | 0 | – | 0 |
| Xavier | | – | | 10 | – | 1 | – | 0 |
| Valparaiso | | – | | 8 | – | 1 | – | 1 |
| Washington University | | – | | 7 | – | 2 | – | 0 |
| Baldwin–Wallace | | – | | 6 | – | 2 | – | 0 |
| Wabash | | – | | 5 | – | 2 | – | 1 |
| Dayton | | – | | 6 | – | 3 | – | 0 |
| John Carroll | | – | | 6 | – | 3 | – | 0 |
| No. 19 Michigan State | | – | | 6 | – | 3 | – | 0 |
| Toledo | | – | | 6 | – | 4 | – | 0 |
| Michigan Tech | | – | | 4 | – | 3 | – | 0 |
| Youngstown | | – | | 4 | – | 3 | – | 1 |
| Bowling Green | | – | | 4 | – | 5 | – | 0 |
| Marquette | | – | | 4 | – | 5 | – | 0 |
| Central Michigan | | – | | 3 | – | 4 | – | 0 |
| Wayne | | – | | 3 | – | 5 | – | 0 |
| Indiana State | | – | | 1 | – | 9 | – | 0 |
| Michigan State Normal | | – | | 0 | – | 8 | – | 0 |
Rankings from AP Poll

The 1949 Toledo Rockets football team was an American football team that represented Toledo University during the 1949 college football season. In their second and final season under head coach Skip Stahley, the Rockets compiled a 6–4 record, outscored their opponents by a combined total of 318 to 210, and lost to Mid-American Conference champion Cincinnati, 33–13, in the fourth postseason Glass Bowl game.

During the 1949 season, Toledo back Emerson Cole, who later played in the NFL, rushed 160 times for 1,172 yards, an average of 7.26 yards per carry. On November 12, 1949, Cole rushed for 230 yards against North Dakota. Cole's 1,172 rushing yards stood as a Toledo single-season record until 1984. The 1939 Toledo team averaged 253.8 rushing yards per game. Ed Burrus and George Miley were the team captains.

== Schedule ==
| Date | Opponent | Site | Result | Attendance | Source |
|---|---|---|---|---|---|
| September 25 | Loras | Glass Bowl; Toledo, OH | L 26–35 | | |
| October 1 | John Carroll | Glass Bowl; Toledo, OH | L 14–28 | | |
| October 8 | Bowling Green | Glass Bowl; Toledo, OH (rivalry) | W 20–19 | | |
| October 15 | at Dayton | University of Dayton Stadium; Dayton, OH | L 14–47 | 6,500 | |
| October 22 | Springfield | Glass Bowl; Toledo, OH | W 42–14 | | |
| October 29 | Oklahoma City | Glass Bowl; Toledo, OH | W 48–7 | | |
| November 5 | at Wayne | Tom Adams Field; Detroit, MI | W 37–7 | | |
| November 12 | North Dakota | Glass Bowl; Toledo, OH | W 56–6 | | |
| November 19 | at New Hampshire | Lewis Stadium; Durham, NH | W 48–14 | 8,000 | |
| December 3 | Cincinnati | Glass Bowl; Toledo, OH (Glass Bowl) | L 13–33 | | |

== After the season ==
=== NFL draft ===
The following Rocket was selected in the 1950 NFL draft following the season.

| Round | Pick | Player | Position | NFL club |
|---|---|---|---|---|
| 12 | 156 | Emerson Cole | Back | Cleveland Browns |
