= 1949 Western Michigan Broncos football team =

American college football season

1949 Western Michigan Broncos football
- Conference: Mid-American Conference
- Record: 4–4 (2–3 MAC)
- Head coach: John Gill (8th season)
- MVP: George Dunn
- Captain: Bob Carlson
- Home stadium: Waldo Stadium

1949 Mid-American Conference football standings
	Conf.					Overall
Team	W		L		T	W		L		T
Cincinnati $	4	–	0	–	0	7	–	4	–	0
Miami (OH)	3	–	1	–	0	5	–	4	–	0
Ohio	2	–	2	–	0	4	–	4	–	1
Western Michigan	2	–	3	–	0	4	–	4	–	0
Western Reserve	1	–	3	–	1	4	–	5	–	1
Butler	0	–	3	–	0	2	–	6	–	0
$ – Conference champion

The 1949 Western Michigan Broncos football team represented Michigan College of Education (later renamed Western Michigan University) in the Mid-American Conference (MAC) during the 1949 college football season. In their eighth season under head coach John Gill, the Broncos compiled a 4–4 record (2–3 against MAC opponents), finished in fourth place in the MAC, and outscored their opponents, 148 to 123. The team played its home games at Waldo Stadium in Kalamazoo, Michigan.

Guard Bob Carlson was the team captain. Safety George Dunn received the team's most outstanding player award.

== Schedule ==
Date	Time	Opponent	Site	TV	Result	Attendance	Source
September 24		Iowa State Teachers*	Waldo Stadium; Kalamazoo, MI		W 20–6		
October 1		Ohio	Waldo Stadium; Kalamazoo, MI		L 6–16		
October 8		at Cincinnati	Nippert Stadium; Cincinnati, OH		L 6–27		
October 15		Washington University*	Waldo Stadium; Kalamazoo, MI		L 0–12		
October 22		at Central Michigan*	Alumni Field; Mount Pleasant, MI (rivalry)		W 35–8		
October 29		Miami (OH)	Waldo Stadium; Kalamazoo, MI		L 20–34		
November 5	2:30 p.m.	at Butler	Butler Bowl; Indianapolis, IN	WFBM-TV	W 40–6	3,000	
November 12		at Western Reserve	League Park; Cleveland, OH		W 21–14	3,500	
*Non-conference game; All times are in Eastern time
