= 1949 Butler Bulldogs football team =

American college football season

1949 Butler Bulldogs football
- Conference: Mid-American Conference
- Record: 2–6 (0–3 MAC)
- Head coach: Tony Hinkle (12th season)
- Home stadium: Butler Bowl

1949 Mid-American Conference football standings
	Conf.					Overall
Team	W		L		T	W		L		T
Cincinnati $	4	–	0	–	0	7	–	4	–	0
Miami (OH)	3	–	1	–	0	5	–	4	–	0
Ohio	2	–	2	–	0	4	–	4	–	1
Western Michigan	2	–	3	–	0	4	–	4	–	0
Western Reserve	1	–	3	–	1	4	–	5	–	1
Butler	0	–	3	–	0	2	–	6	–	0
$ – Conference champion

The 1949 Butler Bulldogs football team represented Butler University as a member of the Mid-American Conference (MAC) during the 1949 college football season. Led by 12th-year head coach Tony Hinkle, the Bulldogs compiled an overall record of 2–6 with a mark of 0–3 in conference play, placing last out of six teams in the MAC. Butler played home games at the Butler Bowl in Indianapolis.

== Schedule ==
Date	Time	Opponent	Site	TV	Result	Attendance	Source
September 24	2:00 p.m.	Evansville*	Butler Bowl; Indianapolis, IN	WFBM-TV	L 7–24	10,000	
October 1	2:00 p.m.	at Wabash*	Crawfordsville, IN		W 14–7	4,200	
October 8	2:00 p.m.	Western Reserve	Butler Bowl; Indianapolis, IN	WFBM-TV	L 6–28	5,000	
October 15	2:00 p.m.	Indiana State*	Butler Bowl; Indianapolis, IN	WFBM-TV	W 47–14	5,000	
October 22	2:00 p.m.	at Washington University*	Francis Field; St. Louis, MO		L 0–7	5,500	
October 29	2:00 p.m.	Illinois State*^{†}	Butler Bowl; Indianapolis, IN	WFBM-TV	L 0–14	7,000–8,500	
November 5	1:30 p.m.	Western Michigan	Butler Bowl; Indianapolis, IN	WFBM-TV	L 6–40	3,000	
November 12	1:00 p.m.	at Ohio	Peden Stadium; Athens, OH		L 0–14		
*Non-conference game; ^{†}Homecoming; All times are in Central time
