= 1949 Augustana (Illinois) Vikings football team =

American college football season

1949 Augustana (Illinois) Vikings football

CCI co-champion
- Conference: College Conference of Illinois
- Record: 6–2 (5–0 CCI)
- Head coach: Butch Stolfa (3rd season)
- Home stadium: Rock Island public schools stadium, Ericsson Field

1949 College Conference of Illinois football standings
	Conf.					Overall
Team	W		L		T	W		L		T
Wheaton (IL) +	5	–	0	–	0	8	–	2	–	0
Augustana (IL) +	5	–	0	–	0	6	–	2	–	0
Lake Forest	3	–	2	–	0	3	–	5	–	0
Illinois Wesleyan	2	–	2	–	0	4	–	5	–	0
Millikin	2	–	2	–	1	2	–	5	–	1
North Central (IL)	2	–	3	–	1	3	–	4	–	1
Illinois College	1	–	2	–	1	4	–	3	–	1
Carthage	1	–	4	–	1	2	–	6	–	1
Elmhurst	0	–	6	–	0	0	–	8	–	0
+ – Conference co-champions

The 1949 Augustana (Illinois) Vikings football team represented Augustana College as a member of the College Conference of Illinois (CCI) during the 1949 college football season. Led by Butch Stolfa in his third and final season as head coach, the Vikings compiled an overall record of 6–2 with a mark of 5–0 in conference play, sharing the CCI title with the Wheaton Crusaders. Augustana played home games at Rock Island public schools stadium and Ericsson Field in Rock Island, Illinois.

== Schedule ==
Date	Time	Opponent	Site	Result	Attendance	Source
September 17		at Cornell (IA)*	Mount Vernon, IA	W 20–0 (practice)		
September 24	2:00 p.m.	at Elmhurst	Elmhurst field; Elmhurst, IL	W 54–0		
October 1	8:00 p.m.	Illinois Wesleyan	Rock Island public schools stadium; Rock Island, IL	W 15–6		
October 8	8:00 p.m.	at Luther*	Nustad Field; Decorah, IA	L 7–14		
October 15	2:00 p.m.	Knox*	Ericsson Field; Rock Island, IL	W 20–13	3,200	
October 22	2:00 p.m.	North Central (IL)^{†}	Ericsson Field; Rock Island, IL	W 21–7	3,000	
October 29	2:00 p.m.	at Monmouth (IL)*	Monmouth, IL	L 0–14		
November 5	2:00 p.m.	Carthage	Ericsson Field; Rock Island, IL	W 21–13	2,500	
November 12	2:00 p.m.	at Illinois College	Jacksonville, IL	W 14–7		
*Non-conference game; ^{†}Homecoming; All times are in Central time
