= 1949 Central Michigan Chippewas football team =

American college football season

1949 Central Michigan Chippewas football
- Conference: Independent
- Record: 3–4
- Head coach: Lyle Bennett (3rd season)
- Home stadium: Alumni Field

1949 Midwestern college football independents records
	Conf.			Overall
Team	W	L	T	W		L		T
No. 1 Notre Dame		–		10	–	0	–	0
Ball State		–		8	–	0	–	0
Xavier		–		10	–	1	–	0
Valparaiso		–		8	–	1	–	1
Washington University		–		7	–	2	–	0
Baldwin–Wallace		–		6	–	2	–	0
Wabash		–		5	–	2	–	1
Dayton		–		6	–	3	–	0
John Carroll		–		6	–	3	–	0
No. 19 Michigan State		–		6	–	3	–	0
Toledo		–		6	–	4	–	0
Michigan Tech		–		4	–	3	–	0
Youngstown		–		4	–	3	–	1
Bowling Green		–		4	–	5	–	0
Marquette		–		4	–	5	–	0
Central Michigan		–		3	–	4	–	0
Wayne		–		3	–	5	–	0
Indiana State		–		1	–	9	–	0
Michigan State Normal		–		0	–	8	–	0
Rankings from AP Poll

The 1949 Central Michigan Chippewas football team represented Central Michigan College of Education, later renamed Central Michigan University, as an independent during the 1949 college football season. In their third and final season under head coach Lyle Bennett, the Chippewas compiled a 3–4 record and were outscored by their opponents by a combined total of 109 to 106.

On January 20, 1950, Bennett resigned as the school's head football coach. In three years as head coach from 1947 to 1949, Bennett compiled a record of 8–15–1. He stayed on at Central Michigan as the track coach and a trainer.

== Schedule ==
Date	Opponent	Site	Result	Attendance	Source
September 23	at Ferris Institute	Big Rapids, MI	W 33–7		
October 1	at Bowling Green	Bowling Green, OH	L 0–20		
October 8	at Michigan Tech	Houghton, MI	W 35–6		
October 14	at Kent State	Memorial Stadium; Kent, OH	L 12–26		
October 22	Western Michigan	Alumni Field; Mount Pleasant, MI (rivalry)	L 8–35		
October 29	Hillsdale^{†}	Alumni Field; Mount Pleasant, MI	L 0–8	5,000	
November 4	Michigan State Normal	Alumni Field; Mount Pleasant, MI (rivalry)	W 18–7		
^{†}Homecoming
