= Butch Stolfa =

American football and basketball player and coach

Biographical details
- Born: September 6, 1917; Cicero, Illinois, U.S.
- Died: March 8, 1976 (aged 58); Iowa City, Iowa, U.S.

Playing career

Football
- 1935–1938: Luther
- 1939: Chicago Bears
- Positions: Quarterback, defensive back

Coaching career (HC unless noted)

Football
- 1947–1949: Augustana (IL)
- 1950–1959: Davenport Central HS (IA)

Basketball
- 1947–1950: Augustana (IL)

Head coaching record
- Overall: 14–7–3 (college football); 23–35 (college basketball)

Accomplishments and honors

Championships
- Football; 1 CCI (1949)

Anton James "Butch" Stolfa (September 6, 1917 – March 8, 1976) was an American football and basketball and coach. He was selected in the 14th round of the 1939 NFL draft. He served as the head football coach at Augustana College in Rock Island, Illinois from 1947 to 1949, compiling a record of 14–7–3. Stolfa was also he head basketball coach at Augustana from 1947 to 1950, tallying a mark of 23–35.

== Head coaching record ==
=== College football ===
Year	Team	Overall	Conference	Standing	Bowl/playoffs
Augustana (Illinois) Vikings (College Conference of Illinois) (1947–1949)
1947	Augustana	4–2–2	3–1–1	3rd	
1948	Augustana	4–3–1	2–3	5th	
1949	Augustana	6–2	5–0	1st	
Augustana:		14–7–3	10–4–1		
Total:		14–7–3			
National championship Conference title Conference division title or championship game berth
