= 1949 Illinois State Normal Redbirds football team =

American college football season

1949 Illinois State Normal Redbirds football
- Conference: Illinois Intercollegiate Athletic Conference
- Record: 6–2–1 (1–2–1 IIAC)
- Head coach: Edwin Struck (5th season)
- Captains: John DalSanto; Harlow Swartout
- Home stadium: McCormick Field

1949 Illinois Intercollegiate Athletic Conference football standings
	Conf.					Overall
Team	W		L		T	W		L		T
Western Illinois $	4	–	0	–	0	9	–	1	–	0
Northern Illinois State	2	–	1	–	1	7	–	2	–	1
Eastern Illinois	2	–	2	–	0	3	–	5	–	0
Illinois State Normal	1	–	2	–	1	6	–	2	–	1
Southern Illinois	0	–	4	–	0	2	–	7	–	0
$ – Conference champion

The 1949 Illinois State Normal Redbirds football team represented Illinois State Normal University—now known as Illinois State University—as a member of the Illinois Intercollegiate Athletic Conference (IIAC) during the 1949 college football season. The team was led by fifth-year head coach Edwin Struck and played its home games at McCormick Field. The Redbirds finished the season with a 6–2–1 overall record and a 1–2–1 record in conference play.

== Schedule ==
Date	Time	Opponent	Site	TV	Result	Attendance	Source
September 24		Indiana State*	McCormick Field; Normal, IL		W 28–0		
October 1		at Millikin*	J.M.U. Field; Decatur, IL		W 13–0		
October 8		at Eastern Illinois	Lincoln Field; Charleston, IL (rivalry)		L 6–7		
October 15		Southern Illinois	McCormick Field; Normal, IL		W 35–0		
October 22		at Western Illinois	Morgan Field; Macomb, IL		L 14–19	5,000	
October 29	2:00 p.m.	at Butler*	Butler Bowl; Indianapolis, IN	WFBM-TV	W 14–0	7,000–8,500	
November 5		Northern Illinois State^{†}	McCormick Field; Normal, IL		T 14–14	6,000	
November 12		La Crosse State*	McCormick Field; Normal, IL		W 26–14		
November 19		Illinois Wesleyan*	McCormick Field; Normal, IL		W 29–0		
*Non-conference game; ^{†}Homecoming; All times are in Central time
