= 1949 Michigan State Spartans football team =

American college football season

1949 Michigan State Spartans football
- Conference: Independent

Ranking
- AP: No. 19
- Record: 6–3
- Head coach: Biggie Munn (3rd season)
- MVP: Eugene Glick
- Captain: Harold L. Vogler
- Home stadium: Macklin Stadium

1949 Midwestern college football independents records
| | Conf. | | | Overall |
| Team | W | L | T | W | | L | | T |
|---|---|---|---|---|---|---|---|---|
| No. 1 Notre Dame | | – | | 10 | – | 0 | – | 0 |
| Ball State | | – | | 8 | – | 0 | – | 0 |
| Xavier | | – | | 10 | – | 1 | – | 0 |
| Valparaiso | | – | | 8 | – | 1 | – | 1 |
| Washington University | | – | | 7 | – | 2 | – | 0 |
| Baldwin–Wallace | | – | | 6 | – | 2 | – | 0 |
| Wabash | | – | | 5 | – | 2 | – | 1 |
| Dayton | | – | | 6 | – | 3 | – | 0 |
| John Carroll | | – | | 6 | – | 3 | – | 0 |
| No. 19 Michigan State | | – | | 6 | – | 3 | – | 0 |
| Toledo | | – | | 6 | – | 4 | – | 0 |
| Michigan Tech | | – | | 4 | – | 3 | – | 0 |
| Youngstown | | – | | 4 | – | 3 | – | 1 |
| Bowling Green | | – | | 4 | – | 5 | – | 0 |
| Marquette | | – | | 4 | – | 5 | – | 0 |
| Central Michigan | | – | | 3 | – | 4 | – | 0 |
| Wayne | | – | | 3 | – | 5 | – | 0 |
| Indiana State | | – | | 1 | – | 9 | – | 0 |
| Michigan State Normal | | – | | 0 | – | 8 | – | 0 |
Rankings from AP Poll

The 1949 Michigan State Spartans football team was an American football team that represented Michigan State College (now known as Michigan State University) as an independent the 1949 college football season. In their third season under head coach Biggie Munn, the Spartans compiled a 6–3 record, outscored opponents by a total of 309 to 107, and were ranked No. 19 in the final AP poll.

The 1949 Spartans lost their annual rivalry games against Notre Dame (34–21) and Michigan (7–3). In intersectional play, the Spartans beat Maryland (14–7), William & Mary (42-13), Penn State (24–0), Temple (62–14), and Arizona (75–0), but lost to Oregon State (25–20).

Two Spartans received first-team honors on the 1949 All-America team. Guard Ed Bagdon was a consensus first-team All-American, and halfback Lynn Chandnois received first-team honors from the International News Service and Collier's Weekly, and second-team honors from the United Press and Football Writers Association of America.

After the University of Chicago formally withdrew from the Big Ten Conference in 1946, conference officials began considering other schools to fill the vacancy. In December 1948, conference officials voted unanimously to admit Michigan State, selecting the Michigan State over a competing bid from the University of Pittsburgh. The decision was certified in May 1949, with Spartans' participation slated to begin in the fall of 1950 with the exception of football where their participation was delayed until 1953.

== Schedule ==
| Date | Opponent | Rank | Site | Result | Attendance | Source |
|---|---|---|---|---|---|---|
| September 24 | at Michigan | | Michigan Stadium; Ann Arbor, MI (rivalry) | L 3–7 | 97,239 | |
| October 1 | Marquette | | Macklin Stadium; East Lansing, MI | W 48–7 | 29,992 | |
| October 8 | Maryland | No. 13 | Macklin Stadium; East Lansing, MI | W 14–7 | 32,080 | |
| October 15 | William & Mary | No. 19 | Macklin Stadium; East Lansing, MI | W 42–13 | 32,655 | |
| October 22 | Penn State^{†} | No. 15 | Macklin Stadium; East Lansing, MI (rivalry) | W 24–0 | 43,495 | |
| October 29 | Temple | No. 12 | Macklin Stadium; East Lansing, MI | W 62–14 | 35,003–36,986 | |
| November 5 | No. 1 Notre Dame | No. 10 | Macklin Stadium; East Lansing, MI (rivalry) | L 21–34 | 51,277 | |
| November 12 | at Oregon State | No. 8 | Multnomah Stadium; Portland, OR | L 20–25 | 22,239 | |
| November 19 | at Arizona | No. 18 | Arizona Stadium; Tucson, AZ | W 75–0 | 16,000 | |
^{†}Homecoming; Rankings from AP Poll released prior to the game

== Rankings ==
Ranking movements Legend: ██ Increase in ranking ██ Decrease in ranking — = Not ranked ( ) = First-place votes
| | Week | | | | | | | | |
| Poll | 1 | 2 | 3 | 4 | 5 | 6 | 7 | 8 | Final |
|---|---|---|---|---|---|---|---|---|---|
| AP | 13 | 19 | 15 | 12 (1) | 10 (2) | 8 | 18 | — | 19 |
