= 1949 Ohio Bobcats football team =

American college football season

1949 Ohio Bobcats football
- Conference: Mid-American Conference
- Record: 4–4–1 (2–2 MAC)
- Head coach: Carroll Widdoes (1st season)
- Home stadium: Peden Stadium

1949 Mid-American Conference football standings
	Conf.					Overall
Team	W		L		T	W		L		T
Cincinnati $	4	–	0	–	0	7	–	4	–	0
Miami (OH)	3	–	1	–	0	5	–	4	–	0
Ohio	2	–	2	–	0	4	–	4	–	1
Western Michigan	2	–	3	–	0	4	–	4	–	0
Western Reserve	1	–	3	–	1	4	–	5	–	1
Butler	0	–	3	–	0	2	–	6	–	0
$ – Conference champion

The 1949 Ohio Bobcats football team was an American football team that represented Ohio University in the Mid-American Conference (MAC) during the 1949 college football season. In their first season under head coach Carroll Widdoes, the Bobcats compiled a 4–4–1 record (2–2 against MAC opponents), finished in third place in the MAC, and were outscored by all opponents by a combined total of 120 to 114. Three Ohio players received All-MAC honors: offensive tackle Al Scheider (first team); offensive guard Milt Taylor (first team); and end John Marco (second team). They played their home games in Peden Stadium in Athens, Ohio.

== Schedule ==
Date	Time	Opponent	Site	Result	Attendance	Source
September 24		West Virginia*	Peden Stadium; Athens, OH	W 17–7	10,000	
October 1		at Western Michigan	Waldo Stadium; Kalamazoo, MI	W 16–6		
October 7		Kent State*	Peden Stadium; Athens, OH	W 34–6		
October 15		at Western Reserve	League Park; Cleveland, OH	T 7–7		
October 22		at Miami (OH)	Miami Field; Oxford, OH (rivalry)	L 0–26		
October 29		at Marshall*	Fairfield Stadium; Huntington, WV (rivalry)	L 6–14		
November 5		Cincinnati	Peden Stadium; Athens, OH	L 13–34		
November 12	2:00 p.m.	Butler	Peden Stadium; Athens, OH	W 14–0		
November 19		Buffalo*	Peden Stadium; Athens, OH	L 7–20		
*Non-conference game; All times are in Eastern time
