= 1949 Ball State Cardinals football team =

American college football season

1949 Ball State Cardinals football
- Conference: Independent
- Record: 8–0
- Head coach: John Magnabosco (14th season)

1949 Midwestern college football independents records
| | Conf. | | | Overall |
| Team | W | L | T | W | | L | | T |
|---|---|---|---|---|---|---|---|---|
| No. 1 Notre Dame | | – | | 10 | – | 0 | – | 0 |
| Ball State | | – | | 8 | – | 0 | – | 0 |
| Xavier | | – | | 10 | – | 1 | – | 0 |
| Valparaiso | | – | | 8 | – | 1 | – | 1 |
| Washington University | | – | | 7 | – | 2 | – | 0 |
| Baldwin–Wallace | | – | | 6 | – | 2 | – | 0 |
| Wabash | | – | | 5 | – | 2 | – | 1 |
| Dayton | | – | | 6 | – | 3 | – | 0 |
| John Carroll | | – | | 6 | – | 3 | – | 0 |
| No. 19 Michigan State | | – | | 6 | – | 3 | – | 0 |
| Toledo | | – | | 6 | – | 4 | – | 0 |
| Michigan Tech | | – | | 4 | – | 3 | – | 0 |
| Youngstown | | – | | 4 | – | 3 | – | 1 |
| Bowling Green | | – | | 4 | – | 5 | – | 0 |
| Marquette | | – | | 4 | – | 5 | – | 0 |
| Central Michigan | | – | | 3 | – | 4 | – | 0 |
| Wayne | | – | | 3 | – | 5 | – | 0 |
| Indiana State | | – | | 1 | – | 9 | – | 0 |
| Michigan State Normal | | – | | 0 | – | 8 | – | 0 |
Rankings from AP Poll

The 1949 Ball State Cardinals football team was an American football team that represented Ball State Teachers College (later renamed Ball State University) as an independent during the 1949 college football season. In their 14th season under head coach John Magnabosco, the Cardinals compiled an 8–0 record and outscored opponents by a total of 276 to 61.

== Schedule ==
| Date | Opponent | Site | Result | Attendance | Source |
|---|---|---|---|---|---|
| September 24 | Saint Joseph's (IN) | Ball State Field; Muncie IN | W 28–14 | | |
| October 1 | at DePauw | Blackstock Stadium; Greencastle, IN | W 33–13 | | |
| October 8 | Anderson (IN)^{†} | Ball State Field; Muncie, IN | W 35–0 | 6,000 | |
| October 15 | at Michigan State Normal | Briggs Field; Ypsilanti, MI | W 33–2 | | |
| October 29 | Valparaiso | Ball State Field; Muncie, IN | W 16–6 | | |
| November 5 | at Manchester | North Manchester, IN | W 50–7 | | |
| November 12 | Indiana State | Ball State Field; Muncie, IN (Blue Key Victory Bell) | W 34–6 | | |
| November 19 | Eastern Illinois | Ball State Field; Muncie, IN | W 47–13 | | |
^{†}Homecoming
