= 1949 Bowling Green Falcons football team =

American college football season

1949 Bowling Green Falcons football
- Conference: Independent
- Record: 4–5
- Head coach: Robert Whittaker (9th season)
- Captain: Jack Woodland
- Home stadium: University Stadium

1949 Midwestern college football independents records
	Conf.			Overall
Team	W	L	T	W		L		T
No. 1 Notre Dame		–		10	–	0	–	0
Ball State		–		8	–	0	–	0
Xavier		–		10	–	1	–	0
Valparaiso		–		8	–	1	–	1
Washington University		–		7	–	2	–	0
Baldwin–Wallace		–		6	–	2	–	0
Wabash		–		5	–	2	–	1
Dayton		–		6	–	3	–	0
John Carroll		–		6	–	3	–	0
No. 19 Michigan State		–		6	–	3	–	0
Toledo		–		6	–	4	–	0
Michigan Tech		–		4	–	3	–	0
Youngstown		–		4	–	3	–	1
Bowling Green		–		4	–	5	–	0
Marquette		–		4	–	5	–	0
Central Michigan		–		3	–	4	–	0
Wayne		–		3	–	5	–	0
Indiana State		–		1	–	9	–	0
Michigan State Normal		–		0	–	8	–	0
Rankings from AP Poll

The 1949 Bowling Green Falcons football team was an American football team that represented Bowling Green State University as an independent during the 1949 college football season. The team was led by ninth-year head coach Robert Whittaker. The Falcons compiled a 4–5 record and outscored their opponents 206 to 161.

== Schedule ==
Date	Opponent	Site	Result	Source
September 24	Rider	University Field; Bowling Green, OH	W 47–14	
October 1	Central Michigan	University Field; Bowling Green, OH	W 20–0	
October 8	at Toledo	Glass Bowl; Toledo, OH (rivalry)	L 19–20	
October 15	at Morris Harvey	Laidley Field; Charleston, WV	L 0–21	
October 22	at Baldwin–Wallace	Finnie Stadium; Berea, OH	L 21–34	
October 28	at John Carroll	University Heights, OH	L 24–38	
November 5	Kent State	University Field; Bowling Green, OH (rivalry)	W 27–6	
November 12	at Mount Union	Mount Union Stadium; Alliance, OH	W 35–7	
November 19	Eastern Kentucky	University Field; Bowling Green, OH	L 13–21	
