= John Gill (coach) =

American football and baseball coach (1898–1997)

Biographical details
- Born: November 27, 1898; Akron, Michigan, U.S.
- Died: March 4, 1997 (aged 98); Kalamazoo, Michigan, U.S.

Playing career

Football
- 1920–1923: Western State Normal

Basketball
- c. 1923: Western State Normal

Baseball
- c. 1923: Western State Normal

Track and field
- c. 1923: Western State Normal
- Positions: Halfback (football); Guard (basketball); Second baseman (baseball); Half mile (track)

Coaching career (HC unless noted)

Football
- 1924–1925: Alma HS (MI)
- 1926–1927: Southwestern HS (MI)
- 1928–1935: Western State Teachers (freshmen)
- 1936–1941: Western State Teachers (backfield)
- 1942–1952: Western State Teachers / Western Michigan

Basketball
- 1928–?: Western State Teachers (freshmen)

Baseball
- 1929–?: Western State Teachers
- 1944–1945: Western Michigan

Administrative career (AD unless noted)
- 1924–1926: Alma HS (MI)
- 1952–1969: Western Michigan (associate AD)

Head coaching record
- Overall: 50–34–1 (college football); 20–13–2 (college baseball)

John W. Gill (November 27, 1898 – March 4, 1997) was an American college football and college baseball coach. He served as the head football coach at Western Michigan College of Education—now known as Western Michigan University— from 1942 to 1952, compiling a record of 50–34–1. Gill was also the head baseball coach at Western Michigan from 1944 to 1945, tallying a mark of 0–13–2.

Gill was born on November 27, 1898, in Akron, Michigan. He attended high school in Lansing, Michigan before moving on to Western Michigan—then known as Western State Normal School—where he lettered in four sports prior to graduating in 1924. Gill played as a halfback in football, guard in basketball, and second baseman on the baseball team. He also ran the half mile on the track team.

Gill began his coaching career in 1924 when was hired as athletic director and coach at Alma High School in Alma, Michigan. He resigned from that post two years later. Gill coached football at Southwestern High School in Detroit for two seasons, 1926 and 1927, before returning to his alma mater—then called Western State Teachers College—as coach of freshman sports in 1928.

In 1939, Gill recommended that the Western Michigan athletic teams change their mascot from "Hilltoppers" to "Broncos," and his suggestion was adopted by the school. Gill was awarded $10 for submitting the team's nickname, funds which he donated to the Waldo Stadium building fund. In 1952, Gill was appointed as the associate athletic director at Western Michigan. He continued to serve in that capacity until his retirement in 1969.

Gill died on March 4, 1997.

== Head coaching record ==
=== College football ===
Year	Team	Overall	Conference	Standing	Bowl/playoffs
Western Michigan Broncos (Independent) (1942–1946)
1942	Western Michigan	5–1			
1943	Western Michigan	4–2			
1944	Western Michigan	4–3			
1945	Western Michigan	4–3			
1946	Western Michigan	5–2–1			
Western Michigan Broncos (Mid-American Conference) (1947–1952)
1947	Western Michigan	5–4	0–1	NA	
1948	Western Michigan	6–3	3–1	T–2nd	
1949	Western Michigan	4–4	2–3	4th	
1950	Western Michigan	5–4	0–4	5th	
1951	Western Michigan	4–4	0–4	6th	
1952	Western Michigan	4–4	1–4	T–6th	
Western Michigan:		50–34–1	6–16		
Total:		50–34–1			
