= 1949 Dayton Flyers football team =

American college football season

1949 Dayton Flyers football
- Conference: Independent
- Record: 6–3
- Head coach: Joe Gavin (3rd season)
- Home stadium: University of Dayton Stadium

1949 Midwestern college football independents records
	Conf.			Overall
Team	W	L	T	W		L		T
No. 1 Notre Dame		–		10	–	0	–	0
Ball State		–		8	–	0	–	0
Xavier		–		10	–	1	–	0
Valparaiso		–		8	–	1	–	1
Washington University		–		7	–	2	–	0
Baldwin–Wallace		–		6	–	2	–	0
Wabash		–		5	–	2	–	1
Dayton		–		6	–	3	–	0
John Carroll		–		6	–	3	–	0
No. 19 Michigan State		–		6	–	3	–	0
Toledo		–		6	–	4	–	0
Michigan Tech		–		4	–	3	–	0
Youngstown		–		4	–	3	–	1
Bowling Green		–		4	–	5	–	0
Marquette		–		4	–	5	–	0
Central Michigan		–		3	–	4	–	0
Wayne		–		3	–	5	–	0
Indiana State		–		1	–	9	–	0
Michigan State Normal		–		0	–	8	–	0
Rankings from AP Poll

The 1949 Dayton Flyers football team was an American football team that represented the University of Dayton as an independent during the 1949 college football season. In their third season under head coach Joe Gavin, the Flyers compiled a 6–3 record.

== Schedule ==
Date	Opponent	Site	Result	Attendance	Source
September 24	Xavier	UD Stadium; Dayton, OH	L 7–21	12,000	
October 2	St. Bonaventure	UD Stadium; Dayton, OH	W 28–13		
October 8	at Marshall	Fairfield Stadium; Huntington, WV	W 40–23	> 10,000	
October 15	Toledo	UD Stadium; Dayton, OH	W 47–14	6,500	
October 22	Youngstown^{†}	UD Stadium; Dayton, OH	W 41–7	10,000	
October 30	at Xavier	Xavier Stadium; Cincinnati, OH	L 0–14	15,462	
November 6	Nevada	UD Stadium; Dayton, OH	W 16–14	9,000	
November 12	at Miami (OH)	Miami Field; Oxford, OH	L 20–53	11,376	
November 19	Scranton	UD Stadium; Dayton, OH	W 54–0	6,000	
^{†}Homecoming
