= 1949 Southern Illinois Maroons football team =

American college football season

1949 Southern Illinois Maroons football
- Conference: Illinois Intercollegiate Athletic Conference
- Record: 2–7 (0–4 IIAC)
- Head coach: Glenn Martin (10th season)
- Home stadium: McAndrew Stadium

1949 Illinois Intercollegiate Athletic Conference football standings
	Conf.					Overall
Team	W		L		T	W		L		T
Western Illinois $	4	–	0	–	0	9	–	1	–	0
Northern Illinois State	2	–	1	–	1	7	–	2	–	1
Eastern Illinois	2	–	2	–	0	3	–	5	–	0
Illinois State Normal	1	–	2	–	1	6	–	2	–	1
Southern Illinois	0	–	4	–	0	2	–	7	–	0
$ – Conference champion

The 1949 Southern Illinois Maroons football team was an American football team that represented Southern Illinois University (now known as Southern Illinois University Carbondale) in the Illinois Intercollegiate Athletic Conference (IIAC) during the 1949 college football season. Under tenth-year head coach Glenn Martin, the team compiled a 2–7 record. The team played its home games at McAndrew Stadium in Carbondale, Illinois.

== Schedule ==
Date	Opponent	Site	Result	Attendance	Source
September 24	at Wayne*	Detroit, MI	L 7–48		
September 30	at Southeast Missouri State*	Houck Stadium; Cape Girardeau, MO	L 7–25		
October 8	at Indiana State*	Memorial Stadium; Terre Haute, IN	L 7–9		
October 15	at Illinois State Normal	McCormick Field; Normal, IL	L 0–35		
October 22	Eastern Illinois^{†}	McAndrew Stadium; Carbondale, IL	L 13–26	10,000	
October 29	Northern Illinois	McAndrew Stadium; Carbondale, IL	L 6–20		
November 12	at Western Illinois	Morgan Field; Macomb, IL	L 0–35		
November 19	Southeast Missouri State*	McAndrew Stadium; Carbondale, IL	W 14–7		
November 26	Indiana State*	McAndrew Stadium; Carbondale, IL	W 41–14		
*Non-conference game; ^{†}Homecoming
