= Glass Bowl (game) =

Glass Bowl (defunct)
- Stadium: Glass Bowl
- Location: Toledo, Ohio
- Operated: 1946–1949

Cover of 1946 official program

The Glass Bowl was an annual postseason college football bowl game played from 1946 to 1949. It was held at the University of Toledo's Glass Bowl.

Toledo had been a manufacturing center for glass objects, including automotive glass for nearby Detroit factories. Wayne Kohn, a shipyard worker at a Toledo glass company suggested to municipal leaders a "Glass Bowl" would be a way to build the city's and industry's prestige. The University of Toledo made the announcement of the new bowl game at a press conference in New York City on October 25, 1946.

The University of Toledo operated the Glass Bowl Game as part of its regular schedule. In the four seasons of 1946 through 1949, Toledo had winning records going into the December date. Toledo won the first three contests but their perfect Glass Bowl record was broken by the University of Cincinnati in the fourth bowl.

In 1950, the game was to be played on December 2, however in early November the University of Toledo's athletic board voted to postpone the game until December 1951 – at the time, Toledo's record was 2–4. In 1951, the University of Toledo called off the game scheduled for December 1, as no schools contacted had indicated they would take part in it; the uncertainty of December weather was also cited.

Like some other postseason match-ups of the era, such as the Grape Bowl and the Optimist Bowl, results are listed in NCAA records, but the games were not considered NCAA-sanctioned bowls.

== Game results ==
Date	Winner		Loser		Attendance (est.)	MVP
December 7, 1946	Toledo	21	Bates	12	12,000	Art Blanchard, HB, Bates
December 6, 1947	Toledo	20	New Hampshire	14	13,500	Dick Huston, HB, Toledo
December 4, 1948	Toledo	27	Oklahoma City	14	8,500	Lee Pete, QB, Toledo
December 3, 1949	Cincinnati	33	Toledo	13	8,000	Gene Gibson, HB, Cincinnati

=== 1946: Toledo 21, Bates 12 ===
Scoring summary

Quarter	Time	Drive			Team	Scoring information	Score	
Quarter	Time	Plays	Yards	TOP	Team	Scoring information	BAT	TOL
1		2	82		BAT	Al Howlett 66-yard touchdown run, Art Blanchard kick no good	6	0
2					TOL	Tony Wolodzko 5-yard touchdown run, John Shutt kick good	6	7
3		11	69		TOL	Dick Ehrhardt 5-yard touchdown run, John Shutt kick good	6	14
4			51		BAT	Art Blanchard 5-yard touchdown run, 2-point attempt failed †	12	14
4					TOL	Chuck Hardy 54-yard touchdown reception from Lee Pete, John Shutt kick good	12	21
"TOP" = time of possession. For other American football terms, see Glossary of American football.							12	21

†Newspaper accounts lack detail of the 4th quarter missed conversion.

=== 1947: Toledo 20, New Hampshire 14 ===
Scoring summary

Quarter	Time	Drive			Team	Scoring information	Score	
Quarter	Time	Plays	Yards	TOP	Team	Scoring information	UNH	TOL
1					TOL	Dick Huston 9-yard touchdown run, John Shutt kick good	0	7
2					TOL	Dick Huston 27-yard touchdown run, John Shutt kick good	0	14
3					UNH	Bob Mikszema 83-yard touchdown reception from Bruce Mather, George Kachavos kick good	7	14
4					TOL	Dick Ehrhardt ?-yard touchdown run, John Shutt kick no good	7	20
4					UNH	Carmen Ragonese 3-yard touchdown run, George Kachavos kick good	14	20
"TOP" = time of possession. For other American football terms, see Glossary of American football.							14	20

=== 1948: Toledo 27, Oklahoma City 14 ===
Scoring summary

Quarter	Time	Drive			Team	Scoring information	Score	
Quarter	Time	Plays	Yards	TOP	Team	Scoring information	OCU	TOL
1					TOL	Jim Hays 9-yard touchdown run, John Shutt kick good	0	7
2			46		TOL	Don Martin 12-yard touchdown reception from Lee Pete, John Shutt kick good	0	14
4					OCU	Jim Wade 8-yard touchdown run, Frank Bruno kick good	7	14
4					TOL	Chuck Hardy 16-yard touchdown reception from Lee Pete, John Shutt kick good †	7	21
4					TOL	Chuck Hardy ?-yard touchdown run, kick no good †	7	27
4			50		OCU	Jim Wade 9-yard touchdown run, Frank Bruno kick good	14	27
"TOP" = time of possession. For other American football terms, see Glossary of American football.							14	27

†Newspaper accounts are unclear as to which Chuck Hardy touchdown – rushing or passing – happened first in the 4th quarter, and which 4th quarter conversion failed. The Associated Press credited Lee Pete with throwing three touchdown passes in the game in 1950.

=== 1949: Cincinnati 33, Toledo 13 ===
Scoring summary

Quarter	Time	Drive			Team	Scoring information	Score	
Quarter	Time	Plays	Yards	TOP	Team	Scoring information	CIN	TOL
2					CIN	Emerson Cole tackled in end zone for a safety by Jack Tracey	2	0
2		4	38		CIN	Bobby Stratton 15-yard touchdown run, George Schuster kick good	9	0
2			32		CIN	Joe Hauk 21-yard touchdown reception from Tom O'Malley, kick no good †	15	0
2			66		TOL	Emerson Cole 8-yard touchdown run, kick no good †	15	6
3					CIN	Bobby Stratton 29-yard touchdown run, kick no good †	21	6
3					CIN	77-yard punt return by Gene Gibson, kick no good †	27	6
4					CIN	Interception returned 73 yards for touchdown by Gene Gibson, kick no good †	33	6
4	1:00	7	65		TOL	George Miley 2-yard touchdown run, Martin kick good	33	13
"TOP" = time of possession. For other American football terms, see Glossary of American football.							33	13

†Newspaper accounts lack detail of the missed conversions.

== See also ==
- List of college bowl games
