= Corn Bowl =

College football bowl game in Illinois, US

Corn Bowl (defunct)
- Previous locations: Normal, Illinois, Bloomington, Illinois, Macomb, Illinois
- Operated: 1947–1955

Sponsors
- Hybrid Seed Corn Breeders of Illinois; Bloomington American Legion

The Corn Bowl was a college football bowl game played from 1947 until 1955 in central Illinois. The first game was played November 27, 1947, in Normal, Illinois, between Southern Illinois and North Central of Illinois. Its final game was played November 24, 1955, between Western Illinois and Luther. There was no game played in 1952 and 1954.

The game was primarily organized by A. B. Perry, who called for the construction of a stadium that would seat 150,000. The plans never came to fruition and the largest crowd attracted to a game was 8,000 spectators for the 1948 matchup. The 1949 matchup was witnessed by 4,567 fans.

The bowl was sponsored by the Hybrid Seed Corn Breeders of Illinois and the Bloomington American Legion.

== Game results ==
Year	Winner		Loser		Stadium	Location	Attendance	Source
1947	Southern Illinois	21	North Central (IL)	0	Fred Carlton Field	Bloomington, Illinois	5,500	
1948	Illinois Wesleyan	6	Eastern Illinois	0	Wesleyan Field	Bloomington, Illinois	8,000	
1949	Western Illinois	13	Wheaton (IL)	0	Wesleyan Field	Bloomington, Illinois	4,567	
1950	Missouri Mines	7	Illinois State Normal	6	Wesleyan Field	Bloomington, Illinois	2,500	
1951	Lewis	21	William Jewell	12	Wesleyan Field	Bloomington, Illinois	2,000	
1953	Western Illinois	32	Iowa Wesleyan	0	Wesleyan Field	Bloomington, Illinois	2,500	
1955	Luther	24	Western Illinois	20	Hanson Field	Macomb, Illinois	5,000	
