= 1949 Boston University Terriers football team =

American college football season

1949 Boston University Terriers football
- Conference: Independent
- Record: 6–2
- Head coach: Aldo Donelli (3rd season)
- Home stadium: Fenway Park

1949 Eastern college football independents records
	Conf.			Overall
Team	W	L	T	W		L		T
Saint Vincent		–		10	–	0	–	0
No. 4 Army		–		9	–	0	–	0
Gannon		–		8	–	0	–	0
Trinity (CT)		–		8	–	0	–	0
Brown		–		8	–	1	–	0
No. 12 Cornell		–		8	–	1	–	0
No. 13 Villanova		–		8	–	1	–	0
Bucknell		–		6	–	2	–	0
Dartmouth		–		6	–	2	–	0
Buffalo		–		6	–	3	–	0
Pittsburgh		–		6	–	3	–	0
Princeton		–		6	–	3	–	0
Fordham		–		5	–	3	–	0
Tufts		–		5	–	3	–	1
Carnegie Tech		–		5	–	3	–	1
Penn State		–		5	–	4	–	0
Temple		–		5	–	4	–	0
Penn		–		4	–	4	–	0
Yale		–		4	–	4	–	0
Boston College		–		4	–	4	–	1
Syracuse		–		4	–	5	–	0
Drexel		–		3	–	3	–	1
Duquesne		–		3	–	6	–	0
Franklin & Marshall		–		2	–	5	–	2
CCNY		–		2	–	5	–	1
NYU		–		3	–	6	–	0
Columbia		–		2	–	7	–	0
Hofstra		–		1	–	5	–	1
Colgate		–		1	–	8	–	0
Harvard		–		1	–	8	–	0
Rankings from AP Poll

The 1949 Boston University Terriers football team was an American football team that represented Boston University as an independent during the 1949 college football season. In its third season under head coach Aldo Donelli, the team compiled a 6–2 record and outscored their opponents by a total of 250 to 108.

== Schedule ==
Date	Time	Opponent	Rank	Site	Result	Attendance	Source
September 23		at Syracuse		Archbold Stadium; Syracuse, NY	W 33–21	25,000	
October 8		at Colgate		Colgate Athletic Stadium; Hamilton, NY	W 40–21	7,800	
October 14		West Virginia		Fenway Park; Boston, MA	W 52–20	19,301	
October 22		NYU		Fenway Park; Boston, MA	W 38–0	5,403	
October 29		Scranton		Fenway Park; Boston, MA	W 46–6	4,418	
November 5		Temple	No. 18	Fenway Park; Boston, MA	W 28–7	14,087	
November 12	2:00 p.m.	Maryland	No. 15	Fenway Park; Boston, MA	L 13–14	30,263	
November 19		St. Bonaventure		Fenway Park; Boston, MA	L 0–19	16,657	
Rankings from AP Poll released prior to the game; All times are in Eastern time

== Rankings ==
Ranking movements Legend: ██ Increase in ranking ██ Decrease in ranking — = Not ranked
	Week								
Poll	1	2	3	4	5	6	7	8	Final
AP	—	—	—	—	18	15	—	—	—
