= 1949 Holy Cross Crusaders football team =

American college football season

1949 Holy Cross Crusaders football
- Conference: Independent
- Record: 1–9
- Head coach: Bill Osmanski (2nd season)
- Home stadium: Fitton Field

1949 Eastern college football independents records
| | Conf. | | | Overall |
| Team | W | L | T | W | | L | | T |
|---|---|---|---|---|---|---|---|---|
| Saint Vincent | | – | | 10 | – | 0 | – | 0 |
| No. 4 Army | | – | | 9 | – | 0 | – | 0 |
| Gannon | | – | | 8 | – | 0 | – | 0 |
| Trinity (CT) | | – | | 8 | – | 0 | – | 0 |
| Brown | | – | | 8 | – | 1 | – | 0 |
| No. 12 Cornell | | – | | 8 | – | 1 | – | 0 |
| No. 13 Villanova | | – | | 8 | – | 1 | – | 0 |
| Bucknell | | – | | 6 | – | 2 | – | 0 |
| Dartmouth | | – | | 6 | – | 2 | – | 0 |
| Buffalo | | – | | 6 | – | 3 | – | 0 |
| Pittsburgh | | – | | 6 | – | 3 | – | 0 |
| Princeton | | – | | 6 | – | 3 | – | 0 |
| Fordham | | – | | 5 | – | 3 | – | 0 |
| Tufts | | – | | 5 | – | 3 | – | 1 |
| Carnegie Tech | | – | | 5 | – | 3 | – | 1 |
| Penn State | | – | | 5 | – | 4 | – | 0 |
| Temple | | – | | 5 | – | 4 | – | 0 |
| Penn | | – | | 4 | – | 4 | – | 0 |
| Yale | | – | | 4 | – | 4 | – | 0 |
| Boston College | | – | | 4 | – | 4 | – | 1 |
| Syracuse | | – | | 4 | – | 5 | – | 0 |
| Drexel | | – | | 3 | – | 3 | – | 1 |
| Duquesne | | – | | 3 | – | 6 | – | 0 |
| Franklin & Marshall | | – | | 2 | – | 5 | – | 2 |
| CCNY | | – | | 2 | – | 5 | – | 1 |
| NYU | | – | | 3 | – | 6 | – | 0 |
| Columbia | | – | | 2 | – | 7 | – | 0 |
| Hofstra | | – | | 1 | – | 5 | – | 1 |
| Colgate | | – | | 1 | – | 8 | – | 0 |
| Harvard | | – | | 1 | – | 8 | – | 0 |
Rankings from AP Poll

The 1949 Holy Cross Crusaders football team was an American football team that represented the College of the Holy Cross as an independent during the 1949 college football season. In its second year under head coach Bill Osmanski, the team compiled a 1–9 record. The team played its home games at Fitton Field in Worcester, Massachusetts.

== Schedule ==
| Date | Opponent | Site | Result | Attendance | Source |
|---|---|---|---|---|---|
| September 24 | Georgetown | Fitton Field; Worcester, MA | L 13–20 | 16,000 | |
| October 1 | at Brown | Brown Stadium; Providence, RI | L 6–28 | 17,000 | |
| October 8 | at Dartmouth | Memorial Field; Hanover, NH | L 7–31 | 10,861 | |
| October 15 | Duquesne | Fitton Field; Worcester, MA | L 14–40 | 7,500 | |
| October 22 | at Yale | Yale Bowl; New Haven, CT | L 7–14 | 18,000 | |
| October 29 | at Harvard | Harvard Stadium; Boston, MA | L 14–22 | 25,000 | |
| November 5 | Colgate^{†} | Fitton Field; Worcester, MA | W 35–27 | 6,000 | |
| November 12 | at Syracuse | Archbold Stadium; Syracuse, NY | L 13–47 | 15,000 | |
| November 19 | Temple | Fitton Field; Worcester, MA | L 7–20 | 5,000 | |
| November 26 | vs. Boston College | Braves Field; Boston, MA (rivalry) | L 0–76 | 38,751 | |
^{†}Homecoming
