= 1949 Colgate Red Raiders football team =

American college football season

1949 Colgate Red Raiders football
- Conference: Independent
- Record: 1–8
- Head coach: Paul Bixler (3rd season)
- Captain: Warren Davis
- Home stadium: Colgate Athletic Field

1949 Eastern college football independents records
	Conf.			Overall
Team	W	L	T	W		L		T
Saint Vincent		–		10	–	0	–	0
No. 4 Army		–		9	–	0	–	0
Gannon		–		8	–	0	–	0
Trinity (CT)		–		8	–	0	–	0
Brown		–		8	–	1	–	0
No. 12 Cornell		–		8	–	1	–	0
No. 13 Villanova		–		8	–	1	–	0
Bucknell		–		6	–	2	–	0
Dartmouth		–		6	–	2	–	0
Buffalo		–		6	–	3	–	0
Pittsburgh		–		6	–	3	–	0
Princeton		–		6	–	3	–	0
Fordham		–		5	–	3	–	0
Tufts		–		5	–	3	–	1
Carnegie Tech		–		5	–	3	–	1
Penn State		–		5	–	4	–	0
Temple		–		5	–	4	–	0
Penn		–		4	–	4	–	0
Yale		–		4	–	4	–	0
Boston College		–		4	–	4	–	1
Syracuse		–		4	–	5	–	0
Drexel		–		3	–	3	–	1
Duquesne		–		3	–	6	–	0
Franklin & Marshall		–		2	–	5	–	2
CCNY		–		2	–	5	–	1
NYU		–		3	–	6	–	0
Columbia		–		2	–	7	–	0
Hofstra		–		1	–	5	–	1
Colgate		–		1	–	8	–	0
Harvard		–		1	–	8	–	0
Rankings from AP Poll

The 1949 Colgate Red Raiders football team was an American football team that represented Colgate University as an independent during the 1949 college football season. In its third season under head coach Paul Bixler, the team compiled a 1–8 record and was outscored by a total of 291 to 186. Warren Davis was the team captain. The team played its home games at Colgate Athletic Field in Hamilton, New York.

== Schedule ==
Date	Opponent	Site	Result	Attendance	Source
September 24	Buffalo	Colgate Athletic Field; Hamilton, NY	W 32–0	15,000	
October 1	at Cornell	Schoellkopf Field; Ithaca, NY (rivalry)	L 27–29	20,000	
October 8	Boston University	Colgate Athletic Field; Hamilton, NY	L 21–40	7,800	
October 15	at Dartmouth	Memorial Field; Hanover, NH	L 13–27	8,000	
October 22	Rutgers	Colgate Athletic Field; Hamilton, NY	L 13–35	7,000	
November 5	at Holy Cross	Fitton Field; Worcester, MA	L 27–35	6,000	
November 12	at Northwestern	Dyche Stadium; Evanston, IL	L 20–39	40,000	
November 19	at Syracuse	Archbold Stadium; Syracuse, NY (rivalry)	L 7–35	36,232	
November 24	at Brown	Brown Stadium; Providence, RI	L 26–41	18,000	
