= 1949 Temple Owls football team =

American college football season

1949 Temple Owls football
- Conference: Independent
- Record: 5–4
- Head coach: Albert Kawal (1st season)
- Home stadium: Temple Stadium

1949 Eastern college football independents records
	Conf.			Overall
Team	W	L	T	W		L		T
Saint Vincent		–		10	–	0	–	0
No. 4 Army		–		9	–	0	–	0
Gannon		–		8	–	0	–	0
Trinity (CT)		–		8	–	0	–	0
Brown		–		8	–	1	–	0
No. 12 Cornell		–		8	–	1	–	0
No. 13 Villanova		–		8	–	1	–	0
Bucknell		–		6	–	2	–	0
Dartmouth		–		6	–	2	–	0
Buffalo		–		6	–	3	–	0
Pittsburgh		–		6	–	3	–	0
Princeton		–		6	–	3	–	0
Fordham		–		5	–	3	–	0
Tufts		–		5	–	3	–	1
Carnegie Tech		–		5	–	3	–	1
Penn State		–		5	–	4	–	0
Temple		–		5	–	4	–	0
Penn		–		4	–	4	–	0
Yale		–		4	–	4	–	0
Boston College		–		4	–	4	–	1
Syracuse		–		4	–	5	–	0
Drexel		–		3	–	3	–	1
Duquesne		–		3	–	6	–	0
Franklin & Marshall		–		2	–	5	–	2
CCNY		–		2	–	5	–	1
NYU		–		3	–	6	–	0
Columbia		–		2	–	7	–	0
Hofstra		–		1	–	5	–	1
Colgate		–		1	–	8	–	0
Harvard		–		1	–	8	–	0
Rankings from AP Poll

The 1949 Temple Owls football team was an American football team that represented Temple University as an independent during the 1949 college football season. In its first season under head coach Albert Kawal, the team compiled a 5–4 record and was outscored by a total of 225 to 156. The team played its home games at Temple Stadium in Philadelphia.

== Schedule ==
Date	Opponent	Site	Result	Attendance	Source
September 24	Texas	Temple Stadium; Philadelphia, PA	L 0–54	12,000	
October 1	Rutgers	Temple Stadium; Philadelphia, PA	W 14–7	10,000	
October 7	at Syracuse	Archbold Stadium; Syracuse, NY	W 27–14	20,000	
October 14	Bucknell	Temple Stadium; Philadelphia, PA	W 20–19	15,000	
October 21	Rhode Island State	Temple Stadium; Philadelphia, PA	W 47–6	15,000	
October 29	at No. 12 Michigan State	Macklin Stadium; East Lansing, MI	L 14–62	35,003	
November 5	at No. 18 Boston University	Fenway Park; Boston, MA	L 7–28	14,087	
November 12	Penn State	Temple Stadium; Philadelphia, PA	L 7–28	18,000	
November 19	at Holy Cross	Fitton Field; Worcester, MA	W 20–7	5,000	
Rankings from AP Poll released prior to the game
