= Phil Ahwesh =

American football player and coach (1919–2004)

Biographical details
- Born: December 14, 1919; Canonsburg, Pennsylvania, U.S.
- Died: February 5, 2004 (aged 84); Washington, Pennsylvania, U.S.

Playing career
- 1938–1941: Duquesne
- 1947: Jersey City Giants
- Position: Halfback

Coaching career (HC unless noted)
- 1946–1947: Canonsburg HS (PA)
- 1949: Duquesne

Head coaching record
- Overall: 3–6 (college)

Philip Samuel "the Canonsburg Cannonball" Ahwesh (December 14, 1919 – February 5, 2004) was an American football player and coach. He served as the head football coach at Duquesne University in 1949, compiling a record of 3–6. A successful athlete at Duquesne, Ahwesh was selected by the Washington Redskins in the 12th round of the 1942 NFL draft.

== Head coaching record ==
Year	Team	Overall	Conference	Standing	Bowl/playoffs
Duquesne Dukes (Independent) (1949)
1949	Duquesne	3–6			
Duquesne:		3–6			
Total:		3–6			
