= Mike Milligan (coach) =

American football player and sports coach (1904–1979)

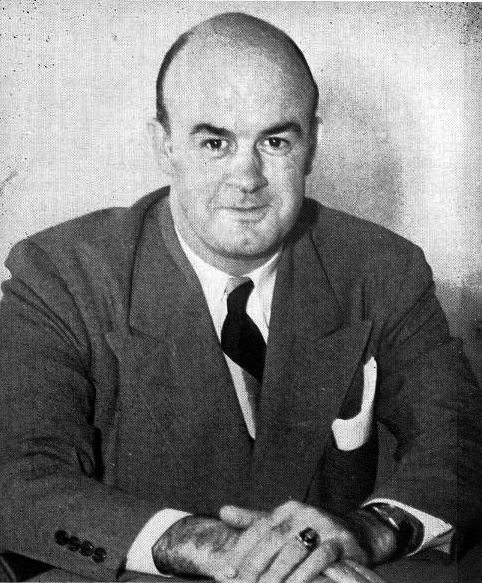
- Milligan during his football head coaching tenure at Pittsburgh

Biographical details
- Born: May 27, 1904
- Died: January 1, 1979 (aged 74); Pittsburgh, Pennsylvania, U.S.

Playing career

Football
- 1929–1931: Pittsburgh
- Position: Guard

Coaching career (HC unless noted)

Football
- 1934–1938: Pittsburgh (freshmen)
- 1939–1940: Florida (assistant)
- 1941–1945: Tulsa (assistant)
- 1946: Pittsburgh (line)
- 1947–1949: Pittsburgh
- 1950: USC (assistant)
- 1951–1952: Purdue (assistant)
- 1953–1955: Nebraska (assistant)

Basketball
- 1942–1943: Tulsa

Head coaching record
- Overall: 13–14 (football); 0–10 (basketball)

Accomplishments and honors

Awards
- United Press "Coach of the Week"; Aliquippa Sports Hall of Fame

Walter Scott "Mike" Milligan (May 27, 1904 – January 1, 1979) was an American football player and coach of football and basketball. He served as the head football coach at the University of Pittsburgh from 1947 to 1949 and for one season as the head basketball coach at the University of Tulsa, in 1942–43.

== Playing days ==
Milligan played high school football at Aliquippa High School and Kiski School. While at college at the University of Pittsburgh, Milligan played guard from 1929 to 1931 under the school's legendary coach Jock Sutherland. The lightest of Pitt guards in 1930, and listed at a height of 5 feet, 10 inches and weighing 168 pounds, Milligan broke into the lineup at left guard when Hart Morris was injured in an October 11 game at Western Reserve. The teams on which Milligan played while at Pitt were regional powers and nationally regarded. The 1929 Pitt team went undefeated in the regular season and won the Eastern Championship and appeared in the Rose Bowl losing to USC. The loss did not prevent football historian Parke H. Davis from naming Pitt as that season's national champion. The following season, Milligan's first as a regular starter, saw the Panthers go 6–2–1. This was followed by an 8–1 finish in 1931 in which the Panthers recorded six shutouts, including a 40–0 dismantling of Nebraska. That season also saw Pitt defeat Penn State in State College, using only one first-string player, by a score of 41–6 en route to winning the Eastern Championship. These accomplishments would prompt Parke Davis to again name the Panthers national champions. During his summers in college, Milligan worked as a desk sergeant with the Aliquippa Police Department.

== Coaching career ==
As a coach, Milligan held several assistant football coaching positions during his career, in which he typically specialized in coaching the lines. He had his only tenure as a head football coach for three seasons at his alma mater, the University of Pittsburgh. Milligan served one season as the head coach for the basketball team at Tulsa, where he also served as a football assistant.

=== Early years ===
Milligan became an assistant coach at Pitt under head coach Jock Sutherland in 1934. He remained a coach at the university, where he served as the coach of the football program's freshman squad, until he quit shortly after the resignation of Sutherland in 1938. From there Milligan took an assistant coaching position at Florida which was followed by an assistant position at Tulsa where he served as the offensive line coach.

=== Tulsa basketball head coach ===
While at Tulsa, Milligan took over head basketball coaching duties from Tex Ryon who left in 1942 after his second stint coaching the team. Milligan was winless in his basketball coaching tenure at Tulsa, where he went 0–10 during the 1942-43 season. Milligan was replaced as the Tulsa's basketball coach the following year by Woody West.

=== Pitt football head coach ===
"[Milligan] is, in my lifetime, the least appreciated Pitt football coach."

— Alex Kramer, Pitt football historian

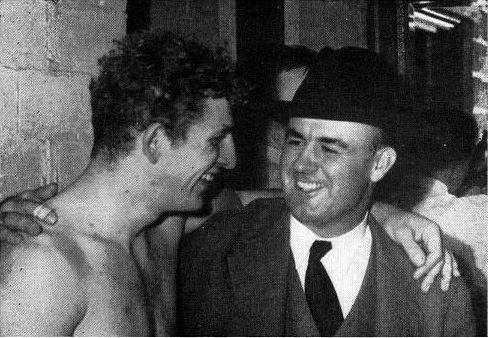
Pitt football head coach "Mike" Milligan (right) congratulates Nick Bolkovac after a 7-0 shut out of undefeated Penn State on November 20, 1948. In the fourth quarter, Bolkovac scored the winning touchdown when he intercepted a pass and returned it from the 23 yard line. Bolkovac also prevented a tying score on the last play of the game by stopping Penn State fullback Fran Rogel at the Pitt one yard line.

Milligan returned to his alma mater in 1946 as a top assistant for Pitt under head coach Wes Fesler, who left after his only season at Pitt to coach his alma mater Ohio State. Fesler's departure opened the door for Milligan's promotion to the head coaching position. Milligan's head coaching tenure at Pitt was underscored by one of the most satisfying wins in Pitt history when the Panthers defeated the Fesler-coached Ohio State team 12–0 for their only win of the 1947 season. Milligan brought Pitt back to winning records in 1948 and 1949, achieving consecutive 6–3 seasons that included appearances in the national rankings and back-to-back shutouts of Penn State, the first of which snapped Penn State's 17-game unbeaten streak. After Pitt, a twenty-point underdog, defeated defending Rose Bowl champion Northwestern on the road on October 1, 1949, Milligan was named the United Press "Coach of the Week". At the end of the 1949 season, he was also nominated for the Scripps-Howard "Coach of the Year" award. However, Milligan resigned on January 27, 1950, due to a perceived snub by the university offering him only a one-year contract, and he never returned to a head coaching position.

=== Later years ===
Following his stint as the Pitt head coach, Milligan took a series of assistant football coaching positions and was a highly regarded as a line coach. He spent a year as an assistant at USC in 1950, was an assistant at Purdue from 1951 to 1952, and then moved to an assistant position at Nebraska beginning from 1953 to 1955.

== Death ==
Milligan died on January 1, 1979, at a hospital in Pittsburgh, Pennsylvania.

== Head coaching record ==
=== Football ===
Year	Team	Overall	Conference	Standing	Bowl/playoffs
Pittsburgh Panthers (Independent) (1947–1949)
1947	Pittsburgh	1–8			
1948	Pittsburgh	6–3			
1949	Pittsburgh	6–3			
Pittsburgh:		13–14			
Total:		13–14			

=== Men's basketball ===
Record table
Season	Team	Overall	Conference	Standing	Postseason
Tulsa Golden Hurricane (Missouri Valley Conference) (1942–1943)
1942–43	Tulsa	0–10	0–10	6th	
Tulsa:		0–10 (.000)			
Total:		0–10 (.000)			
