= 1949 NYU Violets football team =

American college football season

1949 NYU Violets football
- Conference: Independent
- Record: 3–6
- Head coach: Edward Mylin (3rd season)
- Home stadium: None

1949 Eastern college football independents records
	Conf.			Overall
Team	W	L	T	W		L		T
Saint Vincent		–		10	–	0	–	0
No. 4 Army		–		9	–	0	–	0
Gannon		–		8	–	0	–	0
Trinity (CT)		–		8	–	0	–	0
Brown		–		8	–	1	–	0
No. 12 Cornell		–		8	–	1	–	0
No. 13 Villanova		–		8	–	1	–	0
Bucknell		–		6	–	2	–	0
Dartmouth		–		6	–	2	–	0
Buffalo		–		6	–	3	–	0
Pittsburgh		–		6	–	3	–	0
Princeton		–		6	–	3	–	0
Fordham		–		5	–	3	–	0
Tufts		–		5	–	3	–	1
Carnegie Tech		–		5	–	3	–	1
Penn State		–		5	–	4	–	0
Temple		–		5	–	4	–	0
Penn		–		4	–	4	–	0
Yale		–		4	–	4	–	0
Boston College		–		4	–	4	–	1
Syracuse		–		4	–	5	–	0
Drexel		–		3	–	3	–	1
Duquesne		–		3	–	6	–	0
Franklin & Marshall		–		2	–	5	–	2
CCNY		–		2	–	5	–	1
NYU		–		3	–	6	–	0
Columbia		–		2	–	7	–	0
Hofstra		–		1	–	5	–	1
Colgate		–		1	–	8	–	0
Harvard		–		1	–	8	–	0
Rankings from AP Poll

The 1949 NYU Violets football team was an American football team that represented New York University as an independent during the 1949 college football season.

In their third and final season under head coach Edward "Hook" Mylin, the Violets compiled a 3–4 record and were outscored 181–146.

The team played all of its games at neutral sites or as the visitor.

== Schedule ==
Date	Opponent	Site	Result	Attendance	Source
October 1	at Bucknell	Memorial Stadium; Lewisburg, PA	L 0–14	6,500	
October 8	vs. Brooklyn	Polo Grounds; New York, NY	W 39–13	7,636	
October 14	at Georgetown	Griffith Stadium; Washington, DC	L 6–21	5,000	
October 22	at Boston University	Fenway Park; Boston, MA	L 0–38	5,403	
October 29	at Lehigh	Taylor Stadium; Bethlehem, PA	L 6–21	9,000	
November 5	at Merchant Marine	Tomb Field; Kings Point, NY	W 39–0		
November 12	at Rutgers	Rutgers Stadium; Piscataway, NJ	L 9–33	7,000	
November 19	at CCNY	Lewisohn Stadium; New York, NY	W 41–7	4,000	
November 26	at Fordham	Polo Grounds; New York, NY	L 6–34	17,114	
