= 1949 Syracuse Orangemen football team =

American college football season

1949 Syracuse Orangemen football
- Conference: Independent
- Record: 4–5
- Head coach: Ben Schwartzwalder (1st season)
- Captain: James Fiacco
- Home stadium: Archbold Stadium

1949 Eastern college football independents records
	Conf.			Overall
Team	W	L	T	W		L		T
Saint Vincent		–		10	–	0	–	0
No. 4 Army		–		9	–	0	–	0
Gannon		–		8	–	0	–	0
Trinity (CT)		–		8	–	0	–	0
Brown		–		8	–	1	–	0
No. 12 Cornell		–		8	–	1	–	0
No. 13 Villanova		–		8	–	1	–	0
Bucknell		–		6	–	2	–	0
Dartmouth		–		6	–	2	–	0
Buffalo		–		6	–	3	–	0
Pittsburgh		–		6	–	3	–	0
Princeton		–		6	–	3	–	0
Fordham		–		5	–	3	–	0
Tufts		–		5	–	3	–	1
Carnegie Tech		–		5	–	3	–	1
Penn State		–		5	–	4	–	0
Temple		–		5	–	4	–	0
Penn		–		4	–	4	–	0
Yale		–		4	–	4	–	0
Boston College		–		4	–	4	–	1
Syracuse		–		4	–	5	–	0
Drexel		–		3	–	3	–	1
Duquesne		–		3	–	6	–	0
Franklin & Marshall		–		2	–	5	–	2
CCNY		–		2	–	5	–	1
NYU		–		3	–	6	–	0
Columbia		–		2	–	7	–	0
Hofstra		–		1	–	5	–	1
Colgate		–		1	–	8	–	0
Harvard		–		1	–	8	–	0
Rankings from AP Poll

The 1949 Syracuse Orangemen football team represented Syracuse University as an independent during the 1949 college football season. This was Syracuse's first season under head coach Ben Schwartzwalder, who would eventually coach at the school for 25 years and become Syracuse's all-time winningest coach. The Orangemen finished the season with a record of 4–5.

== Schedule ==
Date	Opponent	Site	Result	Attendance	Source
September 23	Boston University	Archbold Stadium; Syracuse, NY	L 21–33	25,000	
October 1	Lafayette	Archbold Stadium; Syracuse, NY	W 20–13	22,000	
October 7	Temple	Archbold Stadium; Syracuse, NY	L 14–27	20,000	
October 15	at Rutgers	Rutgers Stadium; Piscataway, NJ	W 21–9	12,000	
October 22	at Fordham	Polo Grounds; New York, NY	L 21–47	18,615	
October 29	at Penn State	New Beaver Field; University Park, PA (rivalry)	L 21–33	18,600	
November 5	at No. 7 Cornell	Schoellkopf Field; Ithaca, NY	L 7–33	33,000	
November 12	Holy Cross	Archbold Stadium; Syracuse, NY	W 47–13	15,000	
November 19	Colgate	Archbold Stadium; Syracuse, NY (rivalry)	W 35–7	36,232	
Rankings from AP Poll released prior to the game
