= 1949 Yale Bulldogs football team =

American college football season

1949 Yale Bulldogs football
- Conference: Independent
- Record: 4–4
- Head coach: Herman Hickman (2nd season)
- Captain: Levi Jackson
- Home stadium: Yale Bowl

1949 Eastern college football independents records
	Conf.			Overall
Team	W	L	T	W		L		T
Saint Vincent		–		10	–	0	–	0
No. 4 Army		–		9	–	0	–	0
Gannon		–		8	–	0	–	0
Trinity (CT)		–		8	–	0	–	0
Brown		–		8	–	1	–	0
No. 12 Cornell		–		8	–	1	–	0
No. 13 Villanova		–		8	–	1	–	0
Bucknell		–		6	–	2	–	0
Dartmouth		–		6	–	2	–	0
Buffalo		–		6	–	3	–	0
Pittsburgh		–		6	–	3	–	0
Princeton		–		6	–	3	–	0
Fordham		–		5	–	3	–	0
Tufts		–		5	–	3	–	1
Carnegie Tech		–		5	–	3	–	1
Penn State		–		5	–	4	–	0
Temple		–		5	–	4	–	0
Penn		–		4	–	4	–	0
Yale		–		4	–	4	–	0
Boston College		–		4	–	4	–	1
Syracuse		–		4	–	5	–	0
Drexel		–		3	–	3	–	1
Duquesne		–		3	–	6	–	0
Franklin & Marshall		–		2	–	5	–	2
CCNY		–		2	–	5	–	1
NYU		–		3	–	6	–	0
Columbia		–		2	–	7	–	0
Hofstra		–		1	–	5	–	1
Colgate		–		1	–	8	–	0
Harvard		–		1	–	8	–	0
Rankings from AP Poll

The 1949 Yale Bulldogs football team represented Yale University in the 1949 college football season. The Bulldogs were led by second-year head coach Herman Hickman, played their home games at the Yale Bowl and finished the season with a 4–4 record. The team was captained by Levi Jackson, the first African American honored with the position.

== Schedule ==
Date	Opponent	Site	Result	Attendance	Source
September 24	Connecticut	Yale Bowl; New Haven, CT	W 26–0	24,006	
October 8	at Columbia	Baker Field; New York, NY	W 33–7	30,000	
October 15	No. 14 Cornell	Yale Bowl; New Haven, CT	L 14–48	45,000	
October 22	Holy Cross	Yale Bowl; New Haven, CT	W 14–7	18,000	
October 29	Dartmouth	Yale Bowl; New Haven, CT	L 13–34	50,300	
November 5	Brown	Yale Bowl; New Haven, CT	L 0–14	46,000	
November 12	at Princeton	Palmer Stadium; Princeton, NJ (rivalry)	L 13–21	45,000	
November 19	Harvard	Yale Bowl; New Haven, CT (The Game)	W 29–6	61,000	
Rankings from AP Poll released prior to the game

== NFL draft ==
The following Bulldogs were selected in the National Football League draft following the season.

Round	Pick	Player	Position	NFL team
19	241	Fritz Barzilauskas	G	New York Giants
29	374	Ferd Nadherny	B	Chicago Bears
