= 1949 Duquesne Dukes football team =

American college football season

1949 Duquesne Dukes football
- Conference: Independent
- Record: 3–6
- Head coach: Phil Ahwesh (1st season)
- Home stadium: Forbes Field

1949 Eastern college football independents records
| | Conf. | | | Overall |
| Team | W | L | T | W | | L | | T |
|---|---|---|---|---|---|---|---|---|
| Saint Vincent | | – | | 10 | – | 0 | – | 0 |
| No. 4 Army | | – | | 9 | – | 0 | – | 0 |
| Gannon | | – | | 8 | – | 0 | – | 0 |
| Trinity (CT) | | – | | 8 | – | 0 | – | 0 |
| Brown | | – | | 8 | – | 1 | – | 0 |
| No. 12 Cornell | | – | | 8 | – | 1 | – | 0 |
| No. 13 Villanova | | – | | 8 | – | 1 | – | 0 |
| Bucknell | | – | | 6 | – | 2 | – | 0 |
| Dartmouth | | – | | 6 | – | 2 | – | 0 |
| Buffalo | | – | | 6 | – | 3 | – | 0 |
| Pittsburgh | | – | | 6 | – | 3 | – | 0 |
| Princeton | | – | | 6 | – | 3 | – | 0 |
| Fordham | | – | | 5 | – | 3 | – | 0 |
| Tufts | | – | | 5 | – | 3 | – | 1 |
| Carnegie Tech | | – | | 5 | – | 3 | – | 1 |
| Penn State | | – | | 5 | – | 4 | – | 0 |
| Temple | | – | | 5 | – | 4 | – | 0 |
| Penn | | – | | 4 | – | 4 | – | 0 |
| Yale | | – | | 4 | – | 4 | – | 0 |
| Boston College | | – | | 4 | – | 4 | – | 1 |
| Syracuse | | – | | 4 | – | 5 | – | 0 |
| Drexel | | – | | 3 | – | 3 | – | 1 |
| Duquesne | | – | | 3 | – | 6 | – | 0 |
| Franklin & Marshall | | – | | 2 | – | 5 | – | 2 |
| CCNY | | – | | 2 | – | 5 | – | 1 |
| NYU | | – | | 3 | – | 6 | – | 0 |
| Columbia | | – | | 2 | – | 7 | – | 0 |
| Hofstra | | – | | 1 | – | 5 | – | 1 |
| Colgate | | – | | 1 | – | 8 | – | 0 |
| Harvard | | – | | 1 | – | 8 | – | 0 |
Rankings from AP Poll

The 1949 Duquesne Dukes football team was an American football team that represented Duquesne University as an independent during the 1949 college football season. In its first and only season under head coach Phil Ahwesh, Duquesne compiled a 3–6 record and was outscored by a total of 210 to 140.

== Schedule ==
| Date | Time | Opponent | Site | Result | Attendance | Source |
|---|---|---|---|---|---|---|
| September 17 | | at Wake Forest | Groves Stadium; Wake Forest, NC | L 7–22 | 12,000 | |
| October 1 | | at Muhlenberg | Allentown, PA | W 14–6 | | |
| October 7 | | at Alabama | Denny Stadium; Tuscaloosa, AL | L 8–48 | 15,000 | |
| October 15 | | at Holy Cross | Fitton Field; Worcester, MA | W 40–14 | 7,500 | |
| October 22 | | Villanova | Forbes Field; Pittsburgh, PA | L 0–20 | 14,702 | |
| October 29 | | Saint Louis | Forbes Field; Pittsburgh, PA | W 51–14 | 7,500–8,000 | |
| November 12 | 8:00 p.m. | at Clemson | Memorial Stadium; Clemson, SC | L 20–33 | | |
| November 19 | | at Georgia | Sanford Stadium; Athens, GA | L 0–40 | | |
| November 24 | | at Chattanooga | Chamberlain Field; Chattanooga, TN | L 0–13 | 8,000 | |
All times are in Eastern time
