= 1949 Brown Bears football team =

American college football season

1949 Brown Bears football
- Conference: Independent
- Record: 8–1
- Head coach: Rip Engle (6th season)
- Captains: Joe Paterno; John S. Scott
- Home stadium: Brown Stadium

1949 Eastern college football independents records
	Conf.			Overall
Team	W	L	T	W		L		T
Saint Vincent		–		10	–	0	–	0
No. 4 Army		–		9	–	0	–	0
Gannon		–		8	–	0	–	0
Trinity (CT)		–		8	–	0	–	0
Brown		–		8	–	1	–	0
No. 12 Cornell		–		8	–	1	–	0
No. 13 Villanova		–		8	–	1	–	0
Bucknell		–		6	–	2	–	0
Dartmouth		–		6	–	2	–	0
Buffalo		–		6	–	3	–	0
Pittsburgh		–		6	–	3	–	0
Princeton		–		6	–	3	–	0
Fordham		–		5	–	3	–	0
Tufts		–		5	–	3	–	1
Carnegie Tech		–		5	–	3	–	1
Penn State		–		5	–	4	–	0
Temple		–		5	–	4	–	0
Penn		–		4	–	4	–	0
Yale		–		4	–	4	–	0
Boston College		–		4	–	4	–	1
Syracuse		–		4	–	5	–	0
Drexel		–		3	–	3	–	1
Duquesne		–		3	–	6	–	0
Franklin & Marshall		–		2	–	5	–	2
CCNY		–		2	–	5	–	1
NYU		–		3	–	6	–	0
Columbia		–		2	–	7	–	0
Hofstra		–		1	–	5	–	1
Colgate		–		1	–	8	–	0
Harvard		–		1	–	8	–	0
Rankings from AP Poll

The 1949 Brown Bears football team was an American football team that represented Brown University as an independent during the 1949 college football season. In their sixth and final year under head coach Rip Engle, the Bears compiled an 8–1 record and outscored opponents by a total of 263 to 94. They lost to Princeton in the third game of the season, but won every other game, including contests with Yale, Harvard, Columbia, Holy Cross, and Colgate.

No Brown players received All-American honors. Tackle Bucky Walters received second-team honors on the 1949 All-Eastern football team. Quarterback Joe Paterno and John S. Scott were the team captains. Paterno's brother George Paterno played fullback for the team. The team's leading scorers were Joe Paterno (42 points), Roger Young (36 points), and Joe Condon (34 points on 31 extra points and one field goal).

After the 1949 season, Engle resigned as Brown's head coach to become head coach at Penn State. Joe Paterno joined Engle as an assistant coach at Penn State in 1950.

Brown played its home games at Brown Stadium in Providence, Rhode Island. Attendance rose to 52,500 in four home games in 1949.

== Schedule ==
Date	Opponent	Site	Result	Attendance	Source
October 1	Holy Cross	Brown Stadium; Providence, RI	W 28–6	17,000	
October 8	Rhode Island State	Brown Stadium; Providence, RI (rivalry)	W 46–0	8,000	
October 15	at Princeton	Palmer Stadium; Princeton, NJ	L 14–27	24,000	
October 22	Lehigh	Brown Stadium; Providence, RI	W 48–0	10,000	
October 29	at Western Reserve	League Park; Cleveland, OH	W 28–14	6,000	
November 5	at Yale	Yale Bowl; New Haven, CT	W 14–0	46,000	
November 12	at Harvard	Harvard Stadium; Boston, MA	W 28–14	23,000	
November 19	at Columbia	Baker Field; New York, NY	W 16–7	20,000	
November 24	Colgate	Brown Stadium; Providence, RI	W 41–26	18,000	
