= 1949 Harvard Crimson football team =

American college football season

1949 Harvard Crimson football
- Conference: Independent
- Record: 1–8
- Head coach: Arthur Valpey (2nd season)
- Captain: Howard E. Houston
- Home stadium: Harvard Stadium

1949 Eastern college football independents records
	Conf.			Overall
Team	W	L	T	W		L		T
Saint Vincent		–		10	–	0	–	0
No. 4 Army		–		9	–	0	–	0
Gannon		–		8	–	0	–	0
Trinity (CT)		–		8	–	0	–	0
Brown		–		8	–	1	–	0
No. 12 Cornell		–		8	–	1	–	0
No. 13 Villanova		–		8	–	1	–	0
Bucknell		–		6	–	2	–	0
Dartmouth		–		6	–	2	–	0
Buffalo		–		6	–	3	–	0
Pittsburgh		–		6	–	3	–	0
Princeton		–		6	–	3	–	0
Fordham		–		5	–	3	–	0
Tufts		–		5	–	3	–	1
Carnegie Tech		–		5	–	3	–	1
Penn State		–		5	–	4	–	0
Temple		–		5	–	4	–	0
Penn		–		4	–	4	–	0
Yale		–		4	–	4	–	0
Boston College		–		4	–	4	–	1
Syracuse		–		4	–	5	–	0
Drexel		–		3	–	3	–	1
Duquesne		–		3	–	6	–	0
Franklin & Marshall		–		2	–	5	–	2
CCNY		–		2	–	5	–	1
NYU		–		3	–	6	–	0
Columbia		–		2	–	7	–	0
Hofstra		–		1	–	5	–	1
Colgate		–		1	–	8	–	0
Harvard		–		1	–	8	–	0
Rankings from AP Poll

The 1949 Harvard Crimson football team was an American football team that represented Harvard University during the 1949 college football season. In their second and final year under head coach Arthur Valpey, the Crimson compiled a 1–8 record and were outscored 276 to 103. Howard E. Houston was the team captain.

Harvard played its home games at Harvard Stadium in the Allston neighborhood of Boston, Massachusetts.

== Schedule ==
Date	Opponent	Site	Result	Attendance	Source
September 24	at Stanford	Stanford Stadium; Stanford, CA	L 0–44	38,000	
October 1	at Columbia	Baker Field; New York, NY	L 7–14	28,000	
October 8	No. 17 Cornell	Harvard Stadium; Boston, MA	L 14–33	24,000	
October 15	No. 2 Army	Harvard Stadium; Boston, MA	L 14–54	46,000	
October 22	Dartmouth	Harvard Stadium; Boston, MA (rivalry)	L 13–27	30,000	
October 29	Holy Cross	Harvard Stadium; Boston, MA	W 22–14	25,000	
November 5	Princeton	Harvard Stadium; Boston, MA (rivalry)	L 13–33	28,000	
November 12	Brown	Harvard Stadium; Boston, MA	L 14–28	23,000	
November 19	at Yale	Yale Bowl; New Haven, CT (The Game)	L 6–29	61,000	
Rankings from AP Poll released prior to the game
