= 1949 Buffalo Bulls football team =

American college football season

1949 Buffalo Bulls football
- Conference: Independent
- Record: 6–3
- Head coach: Frank Clair (2nd season)
- Captain: Charlie Dingboom
- Home stadium: Civic Stadium

1949 Eastern college football independents records
	Conf.			Overall
Team	W	L	T	W		L		T
Saint Vincent		–		10	–	0	–	0
No. 4 Army		–		9	–	0	–	0
Gannon		–		8	–	0	–	0
Trinity (CT)		–		8	–	0	–	0
Brown		–		8	–	1	–	0
No. 12 Cornell		–		8	–	1	–	0
No. 13 Villanova		–		8	–	1	–	0
Bucknell		–		6	–	2	–	0
Dartmouth		–		6	–	2	–	0
Buffalo		–		6	–	3	–	0
Pittsburgh		–		6	–	3	–	0
Princeton		–		6	–	3	–	0
Fordham		–		5	–	3	–	0
Tufts		–		5	–	3	–	1
Carnegie Tech		–		5	–	3	–	1
Penn State		–		5	–	4	–	0
Temple		–		5	–	4	–	0
Penn		–		4	–	4	–	0
Yale		–		4	–	4	–	0
Boston College		–		4	–	4	–	1
Syracuse		–		4	–	5	–	0
Drexel		–		3	–	3	–	1
Duquesne		–		3	–	6	–	0
Franklin & Marshall		–		2	–	5	–	2
CCNY		–		2	–	5	–	1
NYU		–		3	–	6	–	0
Columbia		–		2	–	7	–	0
Hofstra		–		1	–	5	–	1
Colgate		–		1	–	8	–	0
Harvard		–		1	–	8	–	0
Rankings from AP Poll

The 1949 Buffalo Bulls football team was an American football team that represented the University of Buffalo as an independent during the 1949 college football season. In its second and final season under head coach Frank Clair, the team compiled a 6–3 record. The team played its home games at Civic Stadium in Buffalo, New York.

== Schedule ==
Date	Opponent	Site	Result	Attendance	Source
September 24	at Colgate	Colgate Athletic Field; Hamilton, NY	L 0–32	15,000	
October 1	Niagara	Civic Stadium; Buffalo, NY	W 26–7		
October 8	RPI	Civic Stadium; Buffalo, NY	W 26–2		
October 15	at Alfred	Alfred, NY	W 32–6		
October 22	St. Lawrence	Civic Stadium; Buffalo, NY	L 7–13		
October 29	Bucknell	Civic Stadium; Buffalo, NY	L 7–21	5,250	
November 5	Washington & Jefferson	Civic Stadium; Buffalo, NY	W 26–0		
November 12	at Rhode Island State	Meade Stadium; Kingston, RI	W 39–7		
November 19	at Ohio	Peden Stadium; Athens, OH	W 20–7		
