= 1949 Dartmouth Indians football team =

American college football season

1949 Dartmouth Indians football
- Conference: Independent
- Record: 6–2
- Head coach: Tuss McLaughry (7th season)
- Home stadium: Memorial Field

1949 Eastern college football independents records
	Conf.			Overall
Team	W	L	T	W		L		T
Saint Vincent		–		10	–	0	–	0
No. 4 Army		–		9	–	0	–	0
Gannon		–		8	–	0	–	0
Trinity (CT)		–		8	–	0	–	0
Brown		–		8	–	1	–	0
No. 12 Cornell		–		8	–	1	–	0
No. 13 Villanova		–		8	–	1	–	0
Bucknell		–		6	–	2	–	0
Dartmouth		–		6	–	2	–	0
Buffalo		–		6	–	3	–	0
Pittsburgh		–		6	–	3	–	0
Princeton		–		6	–	3	–	0
Fordham		–		5	–	3	–	0
Tufts		–		5	–	3	–	1
Carnegie Tech		–		5	–	3	–	1
Penn State		–		5	–	4	–	0
Temple		–		5	–	4	–	0
Penn		–		4	–	4	–	0
Yale		–		4	–	4	–	0
Boston College		–		4	–	4	–	1
Syracuse		–		4	–	5	–	0
Drexel		–		3	–	3	–	1
Duquesne		–		3	–	6	–	0
Franklin & Marshall		–		2	–	5	–	2
CCNY		–		2	–	5	–	1
NYU		–		3	–	6	–	0
Columbia		–		2	–	7	–	0
Hofstra		–		1	–	5	–	1
Colgate		–		1	–	8	–	0
Harvard		–		1	–	8	–	0
Rankings from AP Poll

The 1949 Dartmouth Indians football team represented Dartmouth College during the 1949 college football season.

== Schedule ==
Date	Opponent	Rank	Site	Result	Attendance	Source
October 1	at Penn		Franklin Field; Philadelphia, PA	L 0–21	36,850	
October 8	Holy Cross		Memorial Field; Hanover, NH	W 31–7	10,861	
October 15	Colgate		Memorial Field; Hanover, NH	W 27–13	8,000	
October 22	at Harvard		Harvard Stadium; Boston, MA	W 27–13	30,000	
October 29	at Yale		Yale Bowl; New Haven, CT	W 34–13	50,300	
November 5	at Columbia		Baker Field; New York, NY	W 35–14	25,000	
November 12	No. 6 Cornell	No. 14	Memorial Stadium; Hanover, NH	W 16–7	17,000	
November 19	at Princeton		Palmer Stadium; Princeton, NJ	L 13–19	40,000	
Rankings from AP Poll released prior to the game

== Rankings ==
Ranking movements Legend: ██ Increase in ranking ██ Decrease in ranking — = Not ranked
	Week								
Poll	1	2	3	4	5	6	7	8	Final
AP	—	—	—	—	—	—	14	—	—
