= 1949 Columbia Lions football team =

American college football season

1949 Columbia Lions football
- Conference: Independent
- Record: 2–7
- Head coach: Lou Little (20th season)
- Captains: Leon Van Bellingham; James Ward
- Home stadium: Baker Field

1949 Eastern college football independents records
	Conf.			Overall
Team	W	L	T	W		L		T
Saint Vincent		–		10	–	0	–	0
No. 4 Army		–		9	–	0	–	0
Gannon		–		8	–	0	–	0
Trinity (CT)		–		8	–	0	–	0
Brown		–		8	–	1	–	0
No. 12 Cornell		–		8	–	1	–	0
No. 13 Villanova		–		8	–	1	–	0
Bucknell		–		6	–	2	–	0
Dartmouth		–		6	–	2	–	0
Buffalo		–		6	–	3	–	0
Pittsburgh		–		6	–	3	–	0
Princeton		–		6	–	3	–	0
Fordham		–		5	–	3	–	0
Tufts		–		5	–	3	–	1
Carnegie Tech		–		5	–	3	–	1
Penn State		–		5	–	4	–	0
Temple		–		5	–	4	–	0
Penn		–		4	–	4	–	0
Yale		–		4	–	4	–	0
Boston College		–		4	–	4	–	1
Syracuse		–		4	–	5	–	0
Drexel		–		3	–	3	–	1
Duquesne		–		3	–	6	–	0
Franklin & Marshall		–		2	–	5	–	2
CCNY		–		2	–	5	–	1
NYU		–		3	–	6	–	0
Columbia		–		2	–	7	–	0
Hofstra		–		1	–	5	–	1
Colgate		–		1	–	8	–	0
Harvard		–		1	–	8	–	0
Rankings from AP Poll

The 1949 Columbia Lions football team was an American football team that represented Columbia University as an independent during the 1949 college football season.

In their 20th season under head coach Lou Little, the Lions compiled a 2–7 record, and were outscored 276 to 82. Team captains Leon Van Bellingham and James Ward.

Columbia played its home games at Baker Field in Upper Manhattan, in New York City.

== Schedule ==
Date	Opponent	Site	Result	Attendance	Source
September 24	Amherst	Baker Field; New York, NY	W 27–7	12,000	
October 1	Harvard	Baker Field; New York, NY	W 14–7	28,000	
October 8	Yale^{†}	Baker Field; New York, NY	L 7–33	30,000	
October 15	at Penn	Franklin Field; Philadelphia, PA	L 7–27	34,373	
October 22	at No. 2 Army	Michie Stadium; West Point, NY	L 6–63	27,100	
October 29	at No. 8 Cornell	Schoellkopf Field; Ithaca, NY	L 0–54	25,000	
November 5	Dartmouth	Baker Field; New York, NY	L 14–35	25,000	
November 12	at Navy	Thompson Stadium; Annapolis, MD	L 0–34	18,000	
November 19	Brown	Baker Field; New York, NY	L 7–16	20,000	
^{†}Homecoming; Rankings from AP Poll released prior to the game
