= George Paterno =

American football coach

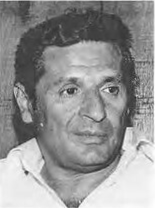
- Paterno in 1976

Biographical details
- Born: September 7, 1928; Brooklyn, New York, U.S.
- Died: June 23, 2002 (aged 73); State College, Pennsylvania, U.S.

Playing career
- 1947–1949: Brown
- Position: Fullback

Coaching career (HC unless noted)
- ?: Brooklyn Prep (NY) (assistant)
- ?: W. Tresper Clarke HS (NY) (assistant)
- 1964: Merchant Marine (assistant)
- 1965–1968: Merchant Marine
- 1969–1970: Michigan State (DC)
- 1971–1975: Merchant Marine

Head coaching record
- Overall: 46–32–3

George E. Paterno (September 7, 1928 – June 23, 2002) was an American football player and coach and radio broadcaster. He served as the head football coach at the United States Merchant Marine Academy in King's Point, New York from 1965 to 1968 and again from 1971 to 1975, comping a record of 46–32–3.

After retiring from coaching, he served as a play-by-play radio analysts for Penn State Nittany Lions football broadcasts. He was the brother of Penn State head coach Joe Paterno.
