= 1949 Drexel Dragons football team =

American college football season

1949 Drexel Dragons football
- Conference: Independent
- Record: 3–3–1
- Head coach: Otis Douglas (1st season)
- Captain: Charlie Pascale
- Home stadium: Drexel Field

1949 Eastern college football independents records
	Conf.			Overall
Team	W	L	T	W		L		T
Saint Vincent		–		10	–	0	–	0
No. 4 Army		–		9	–	0	–	0
Gannon		–		8	–	0	–	0
Trinity (CT)		–		8	–	0	–	0
Brown		–		8	–	1	–	0
No. 12 Cornell		–		8	–	1	–	0
No. 13 Villanova		–		8	–	1	–	0
Bucknell		–		6	–	2	–	0
Dartmouth		–		6	–	2	–	0
Buffalo		–		6	–	3	–	0
Pittsburgh		–		6	–	3	–	0
Princeton		–		6	–	3	–	0
Fordham		–		5	–	3	–	0
Tufts		–		5	–	3	–	1
Carnegie Tech		–		5	–	3	–	1
Penn State		–		5	–	4	–	0
Temple		–		5	–	4	–	0
Penn		–		4	–	4	–	0
Yale		–		4	–	4	–	0
Boston College		–		4	–	4	–	1
Syracuse		–		4	–	5	–	0
Drexel		–		3	–	3	–	1
Duquesne		–		3	–	6	–	0
Franklin & Marshall		–		2	–	5	–	2
CCNY		–		2	–	5	–	1
NYU		–		3	–	6	–	0
Columbia		–		2	–	7	–	0
Hofstra		–		1	–	5	–	1
Colgate		–		1	–	8	–	0
Harvard		–		1	–	8	–	0
Rankings from AP Poll

The 1949 Drexel Dragons football team represented the Drexel Institute of Technology–now known as Drexel University—as an independent during the 1949 college football season. Led by Otis Douglas in his first and only season as head coach, the Dragons compiled a record of 3–3–1.

== Schedule ==
Date	Opponent	Site	Result	Source
October 1	Ursinus	Drexel Field; Philadelphia, PA	W 21–0	
October 8	at Gettysburg	Memorial Stadium; Gettysburg, PA	L 0–21	
October 15	Haverford	Drexel Field; Philadelphia, PA	W 46–0	
October 22	Pennsylvania Military^{†}	Drexel Field; Philadelphia, PA	T 12–12	
October 29	Washington College	Drexel Field; Philadelphia, PA	L 12–18	
November 5	at Dickinson	Carlisle, PA	L 0–27	
November 12	Swarthmore	Drexel Field; Philadelphia, PA	W 24–21	
^{†}Homecoming

== Roster ==
1949 Drexel Dragons football team roster
Players
Coaches
Offense

Pos.	#	Name	Class
TE	8	Augie Scalzo
OT	34	Charlie Pascale (C)	Sr
G	3	George Ream
C	25	Bob Stewart
G	22	Tommy Price
OT		Bill Huster
TE	27	Dick Spahr
QB	16	Bobby Brown
HB	1	Lew Gerlach
HB	6	Joe Bigatel
FB	7	Matt Pasztalaniec
TE	5	Zak Zakarian
TE		Pop Quinlan
TE		Fred Yahrling
TE		Walt Scott
TE	37	Dick Henry
TE		O.G. Jones
TE		Fred Haid
OT		Kim Billings
OT	40	Bob Kravitz
G	15	Ernie Rodgers
C	13	Wolf Wolfinger
C	36	Dick Yasky
C		Dick VanDoren
C	31	Carl Bauer
HB	9	Hank Vaders
HB	19	Dave Donovan
HB	18	Clem Clemens
HB	21	George Rusetski
HB		Josh Stazak
HB	14	George Stozenski
HB		Donald Young
HB	17	Art Fischer
HB	20	Joe Pietrocarlo
HB		Andy Bredbenner
HB	11	Tom Kolongowski
HB	2	Howard Smith

Defense

Pos.	#	Name	Class

Special teams

Pos.	#	Name	Class

Head coach

- Otis Douglas (William & Mary)

Coordinators/assistant coaches

- Bill Ferrell
- Herman Epstein (Maryland)

Legend

- (C) Team captain
- (S) Suspended
- (I) Ineligible
- Injured
- Redshirt

Roster
Last update: February 16, 2018
