= 1949 Trinity Hilltoppers football team =

American college football season

1949 Trinity Hilltoppers football
- Conference: Independent
- Record: 8–0
- Head coach: Dan Jessee (15th season)
- Captain: Roger Hall
- Home stadium: Trinity Field

1949 Eastern college football independents records
	Conf.			Overall
Team	W	L	T	W		L		T
Saint Vincent		–		10	–	0	–	0
No. 4 Army		–		9	–	0	–	0
Gannon		–		8	–	0	–	0
Trinity (CT)		–		8	–	0	–	0
Brown		–		8	–	1	–	0
No. 12 Cornell		–		8	–	1	–	0
No. 13 Villanova		–		8	–	1	–	0
Bucknell		–		6	–	2	–	0
Dartmouth		–		6	–	2	–	0
Buffalo		–		6	–	3	–	0
Pittsburgh		–		6	–	3	–	0
Princeton		–		6	–	3	–	0
Fordham		–		5	–	3	–	0
Tufts		–		5	–	3	–	1
Carnegie Tech		–		5	–	3	–	1
Penn State		–		5	–	4	–	0
Temple		–		5	–	4	–	0
Penn		–		4	–	4	–	0
Yale		–		4	–	4	–	0
Boston College		–		4	–	4	–	1
Syracuse		–		4	–	5	–	0
Drexel		–		3	–	3	–	1
Duquesne		–		3	–	6	–	0
Franklin & Marshall		–		2	–	5	–	2
CCNY		–		2	–	5	–	1
NYU		–		3	–	6	–	0
Columbia		–		2	–	7	–	0
Hofstra		–		1	–	5	–	1
Colgate		–		1	–	8	–	0
Harvard		–		1	–	8	–	0
Rankings from AP Poll

The 1949 Trinity Hilltoppers football team was an American football team that represented Trinity College of Hartford, Connecticut, as an independent during the 1949 college football season. In their 15th season under head coach Dan Jessee, the Hilltoppers compiled a perfect 8–0 record, shut out four of eight opponents, and outscored all opponents by a total of 312 to 38.

The Hilltoppers finished the season with the only undefeated and united record in New England. They averaged 369.3 yards of total offense, 294.5 rushing yards, and 39 points per game.

The team's leading scorers were Bill Goralski with six touchdowns (36 points) and Bill Vibert with 34 points (34 extra points). Five players scored five touchdowns: Dick Aiken; Tom DePatie; Al Magnoli; and Jim Pickett. Three backs finished with over 400 rushing yards: Goralski (499 yards); Roger Hall (445 yards); and Al Magnoli (409 yards).

The team played its home games at Trinity Field in Hartford.

== Schedule ==
Date	Time	Opponent	Site	Result	Attendance	Source
October 1		Williams	Trinity Field; Hartford, CT	W 34–13	4,000	
October 8	2:00 p.m.	at Norwich	Sabine Field; Northfield, VT	W 71–0	3,000	
October 15		at Hobart	Boswell Field; Geneva, NY	W 42–0		
October 22		Middlebury	Trinity Field; Hartford, CT	W 69–13		
October 29		WPI	Trinity Field; Hartford, CT	W 62–0	2,000	
November 5	2:00 p.m.	at Amherst	Pratt Field; Amherst, MA	W 21–6		
November 12		Wesleyan	Trinity Field; Hartford, CT (rivalry)	W 7–6	6,500	
November 19		at Tufts	Tufts Oval; Medford, MA	W 6–0	7,000	
All times are in Eastern time
