= 1949 Boston College Eagles football team =

American college football season

1949 Boston College Eagles football
- Conference: Independent
- Record: 4–4–1
- Head coach: Denny Myers (6th season)
- Captain: Art Spinney
- Home stadium: Braves Field

1949 Eastern college football independents records
	Conf.			Overall
Team	W	L	T	W		L		T
Saint Vincent		–		10	–	0	–	0
No. 4 Army		–		9	–	0	–	0
Gannon		–		8	–	0	–	0
Trinity (CT)		–		8	–	0	–	0
Brown		–		8	–	1	–	0
No. 12 Cornell		–		8	–	1	–	0
No. 13 Villanova		–		8	–	1	–	0
Bucknell		–		6	–	2	–	0
Dartmouth		–		6	–	2	–	0
Buffalo		–		6	–	3	–	0
Pittsburgh		–		6	–	3	–	0
Princeton		–		6	–	3	–	0
Fordham		–		5	–	3	–	0
Tufts		–		5	–	3	–	1
Carnegie Tech		–		5	–	3	–	1
Penn State		–		5	–	4	–	0
Temple		–		5	–	4	–	0
Penn		–		4	–	4	–	0
Yale		–		4	–	4	–	0
Boston College		–		4	–	4	–	1
Syracuse		–		4	–	5	–	0
Drexel		–		3	–	3	–	1
Duquesne		–		3	–	6	–	0
Franklin & Marshall		–		2	–	5	–	2
CCNY		–		2	–	5	–	1
NYU		–		3	–	6	–	0
Columbia		–		2	–	7	–	0
Hofstra		–		1	–	5	–	1
Colgate		–		1	–	8	–	0
Harvard		–		1	–	8	–	0
Rankings from AP Poll

The 1949 Boston College Eagles football team represented Boston College as an independent during the 1949 college football season. The Eagles were led by sixth-year head coach Denny Myers and played their home games at Braves Field in Boston, Massachusetts. Boston College finished with a record of 4–4–1.

In the annual rivalry game against Holy Cross, Boston College routed the Crusaders 76–0, by far the most lopsided result in the history of the series.

== Schedule ==
Date	Opponent	Site	Result	Attendance	Source
September 23	Oklahoma	Braves Field; Boston, MA	L 0–46	36,241	
September 30	Wake Forest	Braves Field; Boston, MA	W 13–7	19,156	
October 8	at Penn State	New Beaver Field; University Park, PA	L 14–32	16,000	
October 14	Ole Miss	Braves Field; Boston, MA	T 25–25	20,103	
October 21	Georgetown	Braves Field; Boston, MA	L 7–10	22,763	
October 28	Villanova	Braves Field; Boston, MA	L 14–28	25,789	
November 5	at Clemson	Memorial Stadium; Clemson, SC (rivalry)	W 40–27	19,000	
November 12	Fordham	Braves Field; Boston, MA	W 20–12	15,798	
November 26	Holy Cross	Braves Field; Boston, MA (rivalry)	W 76–0	38,771	
