= 1949 CCNY Beavers football team =

American college football season

1949 CCNY Beavers football
- Conference: Independent
- Record: 2–5–1
- Head coach: Frank Tubridy (1st season)
- Home stadium: Lewisohn Stadium

1949 Eastern college football independents records
	Conf.			Overall
Team	W	L	T	W		L		T
Saint Vincent		–		10	–	0	–	0
No. 4 Army		–		9	–	0	–	0
Gannon		–		8	–	0	–	0
Trinity (CT)		–		8	–	0	–	0
Brown		–		8	–	1	–	0
No. 12 Cornell		–		8	–	1	–	0
No. 13 Villanova		–		8	–	1	–	0
Bucknell		–		6	–	2	–	0
Dartmouth		–		6	–	2	–	0
Buffalo		–		6	–	3	–	0
Pittsburgh		–		6	–	3	–	0
Princeton		–		6	–	3	–	0
Fordham		–		5	–	3	–	0
Tufts		–		5	–	3	–	1
Carnegie Tech		–		5	–	3	–	1
Penn State		–		5	–	4	–	0
Temple		–		5	–	4	–	0
Penn		–		4	–	4	–	0
Yale		–		4	–	4	–	0
Boston College		–		4	–	4	–	1
Syracuse		–		4	–	5	–	0
Drexel		–		3	–	3	–	1
Duquesne		–		3	–	6	–	0
Franklin & Marshall		–		2	–	5	–	2
CCNY		–		2	–	5	–	1
NYU		–		3	–	6	–	0
Columbia		–		2	–	7	–	0
Hofstra		–		1	–	5	–	1
Colgate		–		1	–	8	–	0
Harvard		–		1	–	8	–	0
Rankings from AP Poll

The 1949 CCNY Beavers football team was an American football team that represented the City College of New York (CCNY) as an independent during the 1949 college football season. In their first season under Frank Tubridy, the Beavers team compiled a 2–5–1 record.

== Schedule ==
Date	Opponent	Site	Result	Attendance	Source
September 24	Susquehanna	Lewisohn Stadium; New York, NY	W 59–0	2,200	
October 1	Colby	Lewisohn Stadium; New York, NY	L 14–20	3,500	
October 8	at Southern Connecticut State	New Haven, CT	L 6–27		
October 15	at Lowell Textile	Lowell, MA	W 14–12		
October 22	at Wagner	Wagner Field; Staten Island, NY	L 6–28		
November 5	at Brooklyn	Ebbets Field; Brooklyn, NY	T 7–7	15,000	
November 11	at Upsala	Ashland Stadium; East Orange, NJ	L 0–7		
November 19	NYU	Lewisohn Stadium; New York, NY	L 7–41	4,000	
