= 1949 Pittsburgh Panthers football team =

American college football season

1949 Pittsburgh Panthers football
- Conference: Independent
- Record: 6–3
- Head coach: Mike Milligan (3rd season)
- Home stadium: Pitt Stadium

1949 Eastern college football independents records
	Conf.			Overall
Team	W	L	T	W		L		T
Saint Vincent		–		10	–	0	–	0
No. 4 Army		–		9	–	0	–	0
Gannon		–		8	–	0	–	0
Trinity (CT)		–		8	–	0	–	0
Brown		–		8	–	1	–	0
No. 12 Cornell		–		8	–	1	–	0
No. 13 Villanova		–		8	–	1	–	0
Bucknell		–		6	–	2	–	0
Dartmouth		–		6	–	2	–	0
Buffalo		–		6	–	3	–	0
Pittsburgh		–		6	–	3	–	0
Princeton		–		6	–	3	–	0
Fordham		–		5	–	3	–	0
Tufts		–		5	–	3	–	1
Carnegie Tech		–		5	–	3	–	1
Penn State		–		5	–	4	–	0
Temple		–		5	–	4	–	0
Penn		–		4	–	4	–	0
Yale		–		4	–	4	–	0
Boston College		–		4	–	4	–	1
Syracuse		–		4	–	5	–	0
Drexel		–		3	–	3	–	1
Duquesne		–		3	–	6	–	0
Franklin & Marshall		–		2	–	5	–	2
CCNY		–		2	–	5	–	1
NYU		–		3	–	6	–	0
Columbia		–		2	–	7	–	0
Hofstra		–		1	–	5	–	1
Colgate		–		1	–	8	–	0
Harvard		–		1	–	8	–	0
Rankings from AP Poll

The 1949 Pittsburgh Panthers football team represented the University of Pittsburgh as an independent during the 1949 college football season. The team compiled a 6–3 record under head coach Mike Milligan.

== Schedule ==
Date	Opponent	Rank	Site	Result	Attendance	Source
September 24	William & Mary		Pitt Stadium; Pittsburgh, PA	W 13–7	21,506	
October 1	at Northwestern		Dyche Stadium; Evanston, IL	W 16–7	41,000	
October 8	at West Virginia	No. 19	Mountaineer Field; Morgantown, WV (rivalry)	W 20–7	31,005	
October 15	Miami (OH)	No. 15	Pitt Stadium; Pittsburgh, PA	W 35–26	20,893	
October 22	at Indiana	No. 16	Memorial Stadium; Bloomington, IN	L 14–48	16,000	
October 29	at No. 9 Penn		Franklin Field; Philadelphia, PA	W 22–21	42,663	
November 5	No. 11 Ohio State		Pitt Stadium; Pittsburgh, PA	L 10–14	54,789	
November 12	No. 9 Minnesota		Pitt Stadium; Pittsburgh, PA	L 7–24	42,515	
November 19	Penn State		Pitt Stadium; Pittsburgh, PA (rivalry)	W 19–0	43,308–44,571	
Rankings from AP Poll released prior to the game

== Rankings ==
Ranking movements Legend: ██ Increase in ranking ██ Decrease in ranking — = Not ranked
	Week								
Poll	1	2	3	4	5	6	7	8	Final
AP	19	15	16	—	—	—	—	—	—

== Preseason ==
Since Coach Mike Milligan, who led the Panthers to a 6–3 record in 1948 was back for another season, and Tom Hamilton was installed as Athletic Director, the Pitt faithful were upbeat for the 1949 season.

Spring drills began on March 29. Head Coach Milligan welcomed 116 candidates, including 26 lettermen. The Athletic Department funded a jayvee team that would play a 4 or 5 game schedule, in addition to the usual freshmen squad. Initially, assistant Coach Ed Shedloskey was in charge of the Jayvees with assistance from Don Fisher, Leo Skladany and John Chickerneo. Paul Sager was later hired to coach the Jayvees. Forty-one students came to the initial tryouts. On April 30, the varsity traveled to New Brunswick, NJ to scrimmage against Rutgers. A week later they held a Blue versus White intra-squad game for fans at Pitt Stadium to close the spring session.

Fall practice commenced August 31 in Meadville, PA on the campus of Allegheny College. Fifty-five Panthers were invited. They spent two weeks at camp, and then returned to campus to finish training for their opening game against William & Mary College.

== Coaching staff ==
1949 Pittsburgh Panthers football staff
Coaching staff: Walter “Mike” Milligan – head coach; Harold Williams – assistant coach; John Chickerneo – assistant backfield coach; Robert Timmons – assistant end coach; Dr. Jesse Quatse – assistant line coach; Paul Sager – jayvee coach; Ted Schmitt– freshman coach; Edmund Shedlosky– freshman coach	Support staff: Thomas J. Hamilton – director of athletics and physical education; Frank Carver – graduate manager; Don Giffen – publicity director; Dr. Ralph Shanor – team physician; Howard Waite – trainer; Bill Haines – equipment manager; Joe Percovich– student manager

== Roster ==
1949 Pittsburgh Panthers football roster
Player	Position	Games	Weight	Height	Class	Prep School	Hometown
William Abraham *	halfback	9	215	5 ft 8 in	senior	Jeannette H. S.	Jeanette, PA
Rudy Andabaker*	guard	9	185	5 ft 11 in	sophomore	Donora H. S.	Donora, PA
Bernard Barkouskie*	guard	9	200	5 ft 10 in	senior	Wilkes-Barre H. S.	Kulpmont, PA
Robert Becker*	fullback	5	190	6 ft	senior	Westinghouse H. S.	Pittsburgh, PA
Bob Bestwick*	halfback	6	180	5 ft 11 in	sophomore	Shaler H. S.	Shaler Township, PA
Michael Boldin *	guard	9	210	6 ft	junior	Johnstown H. S.	Johnstown, PA
Nick Bolkovac*	tackle	9	225	6 ft 2 in	junior	Youngstown H. S.	Youngstown, OH
Fred Botti	quarterback	0	190	6 ft 1 in	junior	Connellsville H. S.	North Union, PA
Bob Brennen*	quarterback	9	215	6 ft 1 in	sophomore	North Catholic H. S.	Pittsburgh, PA
James Campbell*	fullback	9	195	5 ft 11 in	sophomore	Hershey H. S.	Derry Township, PA
Frank Capello	end	2	185	6 ft	senior	Elwood City H. S.	Elwood City, PA
Louis Cecconi*	halfback	9	165	5 ft 7 in	senior	Donora H. S.	Donora, PA
Paul Chess	halfback	2	185	6 ft	sophomore	Meadville H. S.	Meadville, PA
Eugene Cooper	center	0	180	5 ft 10 in	sophomore	McKeesport H. S.	McKeesport, PA
John Coyne	end	0	185	6 ft	sophomore	Munhall H. S.	Munhall, PA
John Dazio*	center	6	195	6 ft	sophomore	Coatesville H. S.	Coatesville, PA
Sam DeFede	tackle	1	210	6 ft	junior	Martins Ferry H. S.	Martins Ferry, OH
Carl DePasqua*	fullback	9	175	5 ft 8 in	senior	Williamsport. H.S.	Williamsport, PA
Nick DeRosa*	end	9	190	6 ft 1 in	junior	Donora H. S.	Donora, PA
Armond DiFonso*	halfback	9	175	5 ft 9 in	sophomore	Jeannette H. S.	Jeannette, PA
Bill Doziski	halfback	1	180	6 ft	sophomore	Donora H. S.	Donora, OH
Dave Fyock	halfback	0	170	5 ft 8 in	sophomore	Evans City H. S.	Evans City, PA
William Gasparovic*	tackle	7	210	6 ft	sophomore	Steelton H.S.	Steelton, PA
Ted Geremsky *	end	9	215	6 ft 4 in	junior	Braddock H. S.	Braddock, PA
Flint Greene*	tackle	7	200	5 ft 10 in	junior	New Kensington H. S.	New Kensington, PA
Sam Haddad	center	0	220	6 ft 3 in	senior	New Castle H. S.	New Castle, PA
William Hardisty*	halfback	7	215	6 ft 3 in	senior	Langley H. S.	Pittsburgh, PA
Harry Hollihan	end	1	195	6 ft 1 in	junior	Glenshaw H. S.	Shaler, PA
Niel Huffman	tackle	0	200	6 ft 2 in	sophomore	Ostrander H. S.	Ostrander, OH
David Karanovich*	guard	9	195	6 ft 2 in	junior	Irwin H. S.	Irwin, PA
Andy Kisiday	guard	2	190	5 ft 11 in	senior	Ambridge H. S.	Ambridge, PA
Lindy Lauro*	halfback	8	195	5 ft 10 in	senior	New Castle H. S.	New Castle, PA
Bobby Lee *	quarterback	9	185	5 ft 10 in	senior	New Castle H. S.	New Castle, PA
Albert Lonoconus	tackle	0	190	5 ft 10 in	sophomore	West Hazleton H. S.	West Hazleton, PA
John Masarick*	end	7	190	6 ft 1 in	junior	Har-Brack H. S.	Tarentum, PA
Louis Melillo*	quarterback	5	180	5 ft 10 in	senior	Kittanning H. S.	Kittanning, PA
Robert Mihm	tackle	4	220	6 ft 1 in	junior	Westinghouse H. S.	Pittsburgh, PA
Joe O'Bara	halfback	1	165	5 ft 8 in	junior	Johnstown H. S.	Johnstown, PA
Mike Omatick	quarterback	0	175	5 ft 11 in	sophomore	Connellsville H. S.	Connellsville, PA
Larry Pierce	guard	1	180	5 ft 10 in	junior	Jeannette H. S.	Jeannette, PA
Robert Plotz*	tackle	8	210	6 ft 2 in	senior	Martins Ferry H. S.	Martins Ferry, OH
Emil Rader	halfback	2	205	6 ft 1 in	senior	Wheeling H. S.	Benwood, WVA
Leonard Radnor*	center	9	185	5 ft 10 in	senior	Plymouth H. S.	Plymouth, PA
George Radosevich*	center	8	200	6 ft 2 in	junior	Brentwood H. S.	Brentwood, PA
Jimmy Joe Robinson*	halfback	8	185	5 ft 11 in	senior	Connellsville H. S.	Connellsville, PA
William Samer*	end	7	190	6 ft 1 in	senior	Donora H. S.	Donora, PA
Ralph Short	tackle	3	170	6 ft	senior	Martins Ferry H. S.	Martins Ferry, OH
William Sichko*	halfback	8	170	5 ft 11 in	sophomore	German Twp. H. S.	McClellentown, PA
Donald Skrbin	guard	0	190	6 ft	junior	Steelton H. S.	Steelton, PA
Alfred Smalara	tackle	0	200	6 ft	sophomore	Springdale H. S.	Springdale, PA
John Stoken	end	0	200	6 ft	sophomore	Aliquippa H. S.	Aliquippa, PA
Earl Sumpter*	guard	6	175	5 ft 10 in	senior	Clairton H. S.	Clairton, PA
Charles Thomas	guard	0	190	6 ft 3 in	senior	Dormont H. S.	Dormont, PA
Chris Warriner*	end	7	195	5 ft 11 in	sophomore	Tarentum H. S.	Tarentum, PA
Harold Wertman	fullback	0	205	6 ft	sophomore	ShamokinH. S.	Shamokin, PA
Charles Yost*	guard	6	210	5 ft 11in	senior	Youngstown H. S.	Youngstown, OH
* Letterman

== Game summaries ==
=== William & Mary ===
Week 1: William & Mary at Pitt

Team	1	2	3	4	Total
William & Mary	0	0	0	7	7
• Pitt	6	0	0	7	13

- Date: September 25, 1949
- Location: Pitt Stadium
  Pittsburgh, PA
- Game start: 2:00 p.m.
- Game attendance: 21,506
- Game weather: partly cloudy
- Referee: Francis P. Brennan (Canisius)

Scoring summary
1	PITT	Nick DeRosa recovered a fumbled snap in the end zone ( kick missed)	PITT 6–0
4	PITT	John Masarik 24-yard pass from Louis 'Bimbo' Cecconi ( Nick Bolkovac kick)	PITT 13–0
4	W&M	Vito Ragazzo 8-yard pass from Buddy Lex ( Lex kick )	PITT 13–7

The Pitt Panthers opened the season against the William & Mary Indians of the Southern Conference. This was the first meeting between these schools. Coach Rube McCray's squad opened their season the week before, beating Houston 14–13. All-America halfback Jack Cloud led the Indians backfield and Lou Creekmur, future Pro Football Hall-of-Fame tackle, anchored the line. The Indians squad arrived in Pittsburgh by plane and was housed on campus at Webster Hall.

Coach Milligan had lettermen returning at most positions. He told The Pittsburgh Press: " I don't care what the score is if we've got the most points. We're not looking for an easy afternoon." The Panthers were favored by a touchdown.

The Panthers won their opening game for the first time in 5 years by beating William & Mary 13–7. On fourth down, after the opening kick-off, Indians center George Davis hiked the ball past the punter, Buddy Lex, into the end zone. It was recovered by Panther Nick DeRosa for a touchdown. Nick Bolkovac missed the extra point, and Pitt led 6–0 four minutes into the game. Fumbles, interceptions and defense were the highlights for the rest of the first three quarters. The Panthers offense had possession of the ball on their 32-yard line to start the final period. On the seventh play, Jimmy Joe Robinson handed the ball to Bimbo Cecconi on a reverse. He stopped and threw a 24-yard touchdown pass to John Masarik. Bolkovac made the extra point for a 13–0 lead. Late in the game, William & Mary drove 61-yards and scored on an 8-yard pass from Lex to Vito Ragasso. Lex's point after made the final 13–7.

The Pitt starting lineup for the game against William & Mary was Ted Geremsky (left end), Nick Bolkovac (left tackle), Bernie Barkouskie (left guard), Len Radnor (center), Mike Boldin (right guard), Robert Plotz (right tackle), Nick DeRosa (right end), Bobby Lee (quarterback), Louis 'Bimbo” Cecconi (left halfback), Jimmy Joe Robinsoon (right halfback) and Carl DePasqua (fullback). Substitutes appearing in the game for Pitt were Earl Sumpter, Flint Greene, Rudy Andabaker, John Dazio, Donald Karanovich, Charles Yost, William Samer, Chris Warriner, John Masarik, Robert Brennen, William Hardisty, William Sichko, Emil Rader, Lindaro Lauro, Armand DiFonso, James Campbell and Bill Abraham.

=== at Northwestern ===
Week 2: Pitt at Northwestern

Team	1	2	3	4	Total
• Pitt	7	3	0	6	16
Northwestern	0	0	0	7	7

- Date: October 1, 1949
- Location: Dyche Stadium
  Evanston, IL
- Game start: 2:00 p.m.
- Game attendance: 41,000
- Game weather: clear and cool
- Referee: Jay Berwanger (Chicago)

Scoring summary
1	PITT	Jimmy Joe Robinson 13-yard pass from Bimbo Cecconi (Nick Bolkovac kick)	PITT 7–0
2	PITT	Bolkovac 23-yard field goal	PITT 10–0
4	PITT	Robinson 12-yard run ( kick missed )	PITT 16–0
4	NORTH	Johnny Miller 12-yard run ( Johnny Nemeth kick )	PITT 16–7

On October 1, the Panthers traveled to Evanston, IL to play the Northwestern Wildcats for the first time. The 1949 Rose Bowl champs were favored by three touchdowns. Coach Robert Voigts' club won their opener over Purdue 20–6.

Thirty-six Panthers and three coaches flew into Glenview Naval Air Station and were housed in the Sovereign Hotel near Evanston, IL. This was the Panthers first road game flight since the 1939 trip to Seattle to play Washington. Coach Milligan's squad was healthy, and he made no changes to the starting lineup. The game was televised live back to Pittsburgh by WDTV.

The 20-point underdog Panthers upset the Wildcats 16–7 to extend their win streak to 4 games. The Panthers scored in the first period on a 5-play, 64-yard drive that ended with a 13-yard pass from Bimbo Cecconi to Jimmy Joe Robinson. Nick Bolkovac added the extra point. In the second quarter, after the Panthers offense stalled at the Wildcats 15-yard line, Bolkovac booted a field goal to put the Panthers up 10–0 at halftime. Late in the third quarter, Pitt end Nick DeRosa tipped a Wildcat pass into teammate Rudy Andabaker's hands at the Northwestern 24-yard line. On the second play of the final period, Robinson raced 12-yards around end for the score. Bolkovac's kick missed. Late in the game Panthers halfback Bill Sichko fumbled and Northwestern recovered on their own 30-yard line. It took three plays for the Wildcats to score against the Panthers subs. Johnny Miller ran 10-yards for the score. Johnny Nemeth added the placement.

The Pitt starting lineup for the game against Northwestern was Ted Geremsky (left end), Nick Balkovac (left tackle), Bernie Barkouskie (left guard), Len Radnor (center), Mike Boldin (right guard), Robert Plotz (right tackle), Nick DeRosa (right end), Bobby Lee (quarterback), Bimbo Cecconi (left halfback), Jimmy Joe Robinson (right halfback) and Carl DePasqua (fullback). Substitutes appearing in the game for Pitt were Chris Warriner, Flint Greene, Robert Mihm, Rudy Andabaker, John Dazio, George Radosevich, Donald Kranovich, Charles Yost, William Gasparovic, William Samer, John Masarik, Robert Brennen, William Sichko, Lindaro Lauro, Armand DiFonso, William Hardisty, Robert Bestwick, James Campbell, William Abraham and Bob Becker.

=== at West Virginia ===
Week 3: Pitt at West Virginia

Team	1	2	3	4	Total
• Pitt	0	0	13	7	20
West Virginia	0	7	0	0	7

- Date: October 8, 1948
- Location: Mountaineer Field
  Morgantown, WV
- Game start: 2:00 p.m.
- Game attendance: 31,005
- Game weather: sunny and hot
- Referee: Albert Booth (Yale)

Scoring summary
2	WVU	Bernie Huntz 19-yard pass from Jimmy Walthall (Gene Simmons kick)	WVU 7–0
3	PITT	Bimbo Cecconi 19-yard run (Nick Bolkovac kick)	TIE 7–7
3	PITT	Cecconi 26-yard run ( kick missed )	PITT 13–7
4	PITT	Lindaro Lauro 6-yard run ( Bolkovac kick )	PITT 20–7

On October 9, the Panthers played the Mountaineers in West Virginia for only the sixth time in the 42- game series. The Panthers won the previous 5 contests in Morgantown. The Panthers led the “Backyard Brawl” series 31–9–1. Like Pitt's first two opponents, West Virginia was a reigning Bowl Champion. The Mountaineers beat the Texas Mines Miners 21–12 in the 1949 Sun Bowl. Second-year Coach Dudley DeGroot's squad was 2–1 on the season. They beat Waynesburg and Washington & Lee, but lost to Ohio U.

Friday, thirty-nine Panthers squad members bussed to Uniontown, PA to spend the night at the Summit Hotel. Flint Greene, backup tackle, was injured in the Northwestern game and did not make the trip. Coach Milligan went with the same starting lineup for the third straight game. Pitt fans bought more than 2,000 tickets. The Baltimore & Ohio railroad ran a special train to Morgantown, priced at $3.25 on game day, that left Pittsburgh 9:15 a.m and arrived at 12:55 p.m. The return trip left at 5:25 p.m. and arrived back in Pittsburgh at 9:10 p.m.

The Panthers overcame a first half deficit, and beat the Mountaineers 20–7 to extend their winning streak to 5 games. West Virginia threatened to score three times in the first half and finally succeeded with less than a minute to play. The Mountaineers drove 66 yards and scored on a 19-yard pass from Jimmy Walthall to Bernie Huntz. Gene Simmons kicked the extra point and West Virginia led at halftime 7–0. Bimbo Cecconi scored on two touchdown runs (19 and 26 yards), as he totaled 99 yards of offense in the third quarter. Lindaro Lauro added another touchdown on a 7-yard run late in the game. Nick Bolkovac was good on 2 of 3 placements.

The Pitt starting lineup for the game against West Virginia was Ted Geremsky (left end), Nick Bolkovac (left tackle), Bernie Barkouskie (left guard), Len Radnor (center), Mike Boldin (right guard), Robert Plotz (right tackle), Nick DeRosa (right end), Bobby Lee (quarterback), Bimbo Cecconi (left halfback), Jimmy Joe Robinson (right halfback) and Carl DePasqua (fullback). Substitutes appearing in the game for Pitt were John Masarik, Chris Warriner, Harry Hollihan, Robert Mihm, William Gasparovic, Sam Defede, Rudy Andabaker, Donald Karanovich, Charles Yost, George Radosevich, John Dazio, Louis Melillo, Robert Brennen, Lindaro Lauro, William Sichko, William Hardisty, Armand DiFonso, James Campbell, William Abraham and Bob Becker.

=== Miami (OH) ===
Week 4: Miami (OH) at Pitt

Team	1	2	3	4	Total
Miami (OH)	0	7	12	7	26
• Pitt	14	7	7	7	35

- Date: October 15, 1949
- Location: Pitt Stadium
  Pittsburgh, PA
- Game start: 2:00 p.m.
- Game attendance: 20,893
- Game weather: cloudy
- Referee: John H. Coles (Westminster)

Scoring summary
1	PITT	Bimbo Cecconi 4-yard run (Nick Bolkovac kick)	PITT 7–0
1	PITT	Jimmy Joe Robinson 75-yard run (Bolkovac kick)	PITT 14–0
2	MIAMI	John Pont 36-yard pass from Mel Olix ( George Galat kick)	PITT 14–7
2	PITT	Cecconi 13-yard run (Bolkovac kick )	PITT 21–7
3	MIAMI	Jack Bickel 79-yard run ( kick missed )	PITT 21–13
3	PITT	Jimmy Joe Robinson 26-yard pass from Cecconi ( Bolkovac kick )	PITT 28–13
3	MIAMI	Pont 9-yard run ( kick missed )	PITT 28–19
4	MIAMI	Pont 8-yard run (Galat kick )	PITT 28–26
4	PITT	Ted Geremsky 19-yard pass from Carl DePasqua ( Bolkovac kick )	PITT 35–26

On October 15, the unbeaten Panthers and the Miami (OH) Redskins met on the gridiron for the second and final time. In 1931 the Panthers beat the Redskins 61–0. First-year head coach Woody Hayes' squad beat Wichita in the season opener, and then lost to Virginia and Xavier.

Coach Milligan named the same line-up that started against West Virginia. This game was labelled High School Day, and the fans were treated to a band concert prior to kick-off. The Wilmerding, Charleroi and Springdale High School bands performed along with the 150-piece Panther ensemble. The National Air Guard of Pennsylvania performed at halftime.

The Panthers ran their record to 4–0 with a hard-fought 35–26 victory over the Miami eleven. The Panthers raced to a first quarter 14–0 lead on a 4-yard dash by Bimbo Cecconi and a 75-yard run by Jimmy Joe Robinson. The teams traded scores in the second quarter. Miami's halfback John Pont scored the first of his 3 touchdowns on a 36-yard pass from Mel Olix. George Galat added the extra point to cut the lead to 14–7. Pitt answered with a 13-yard run score by Cecconi for a 21–7 halftime lead. Jack Bickell opened the second half with a 79-yard dash to cut the lead to 21–13, as the extra point was wide. Pitt answered with a 65-yard, 7-play march ending with a 26-yard pass from Cecconi to Robinson. Miami then closed the gap to 28–26 on two straight drives ending with John Pont touchdown runs of 9-yards and 8-yards. Galat converted one of the placements. Pitt, then managed to drive 39-yards, and score on a 19-yard pass from Carl DePasqua to Ted Geremsky. Nick Bolkovac was 5 of 5 for the game on his extra points.

The Pitt starting lineup for the game against Miami (OH) was Ted Geremsky (left end), Nick Bolkovac (left tackle), Bernie Barkouskie (left guard), Len Radnor (center), Mike Boldin (right guard), Robert Plotz (right tackle), Nick DeRosa (right end), Bobby Lee (quarterback), Bimbo Cecconi (left halfback), Jimmy Joe Robinson (right halfback) and Carl DePasqua (fullback). Substitutes appearing in the game for Pitt were William Samer, Flint Greene, Ralph Short, Rudy Andabaker, George Radosevich, Donald Karanovich, Charles Yost, Chris Warriner, John Masarik, Frank Capello, Robert Brennen, Louis Melillo, William Hardisty, William Sichko, Lindaro Lauro, Armand DiFonso, Bill Abraham, Bob Becker and James Campbell.

=== at Indiana ===
Week 5: Pitt at Indiana

Team	1	2	3	4	Total
Pitt	0	7	7	0	14
• Indiana	7	13	14	14	48

- Date: October 22, 1949
- Location: Memorial Stadium
  Bloomington, IN
- Game start: 2:00 p.m.
- Game attendance: 16,000
- Game weather: cloudy and cool
- Referee: Rollie A. Barnum (Wisconsin)

Scoring summary
1	IND	Jerry Van Ooyen 5-yard run (Donald Henkle kick)	IND 7–0
2	IND	Bob Robertson 5-yard run (Henkle kick)	IND 14–0
2	IND	Jim Gomory 17-yard run (kick missed)	IND 20–0
2	PITT	Carl DePasqua 1-yard run (Nick Bolkovac kick )	IND 20–7
3	PITT	Jimmy Joe Robinson 8-yard run ( Bolkovac kick )	IND 20–14
3	IND	Al Tutsie 1-yard run ( Henkle kick )	IND 27–14
3	IND	Robert Robertson 5-yard run (Henkle kick)	IND 34–14
4	IND	Robertson 23-yard pass from Nick Sebek (Henkle kick )	IND 41–14
4	IND	Robertson 29-yard pass from Sebek (Henkle kick )	IND 48–14

On October 22, the Panthers travelled to Bloomington, IN to play the Indiana Hoosiers. The Hoosiers led the series 5–1, but they were on an 11-game losing streak. The Panthers won the 1948 meeting, to start them on their current 6-game winning streak.

The Panthers squad flew into Indianapolis and bussed to Bloomington. They were housed at the Graham Hotel. Coach Milligan's team was a two-touchdown favorite, even though they had never won in Bloomington. The starting line-up remained the same for the fifth straight game.

The winless Indiana Hoosiers took out their frustrations on the Pitt Panthers and won by a score of 48–14. The Hoosiers scored three touchdowns in the first half before Pitt was able to get on the scoreboard. Late in the first period, Jerry Van Ooyen ran 5-yards for the first score. Bob Robertson and Jim Gomory scored touchdowns in the second quarter and Donald Henkle made 2 of 3 extra points to put Indiana ahead 20–0. Before halftime, the Panther offense went on a 72-yard touchdown drive that ended with a 1-yard plunge by Carl DePasqua. Nick Bolkovac added the placement. After halftime, the Panthers cut the lead to 20–14 with an 8-play, 55-yard drive, culminating with an 8-yard scamper by Jimmy Joe Robinson. Bolkovac's kick was good. Indiana answered with 2 touchdowns in both the third and fourth quarter. The Panthers offense had one more sustained drive to the Hoosiers 29-yard line, but lost the ball on downs. The Hoosiers finished the season with a 1–8 record.

The Pitt starting lineup for the game against Indiana was Ted Geremsky (left end), Nick Bolkovac (left tackle), Bernie Barkouskie (left guard), Len Radnor (center), Mike Boldin (right guard), Robert Plotz (right tackle), Nick DeRosa (right end), Bobby Lee (quarterback), Bimbo Cecconi (left halfback), Jimmy Joe Robinson (right halfback) and Carl DePasqua (fullback). Substitutes appearing in the game for Pitt were Earl Sumpter, Flint Greene, Ralph Short, Rudy Andabaker, Andy Kisaday, George Radosevich, Donald Karanovich, Charles Yost, William Gasparovic, Chris Warriner, John Masarik, Robert Brennen, Louis Melillo, William Hardisty, William Sichko, Lindaro Lauro, Armand DiFonso, Bill Abraham, Bob Becker, Robert Bestwick and James Campbell.

=== at Penn ===
Week 6: Pitt at Penn

Team	1	2	3	4	Total
• Pitt	6	7	7	2	22
Penn	0	14	7	0	21

- Date: October 29, 1948
- Location: Franklin Field
  Philadelphia, PA
- Game start: 2:00 p.m.
- Game attendance: 42,663
- Game weather: cloudy
- Referee: Harry O. Dayoff (Bucknell)

Scoring summary
1	PITT	Jimmy Joe Robinson 48-yard pass from Bimbo Cecconi (kick missed)	PITT 6–0
2	PITT	James Campbell 1-yard run (Nick Bolkovac kick)	PITT 13–0
2	PENN	Raymond Dooney 9-yard run (Herbert Agocs kick)	PITT 13–7
2	PENN	William Rhoads 51-yard pass from Francis Bagnell (Agocs kick )	PENN 14–13
3	PENN	Dooney 1-yard run (Agocs kick)	PENN 21–13
3	PITT	Carl DePasqua 1-yard run (Bolkovac kick )	PENN 21–20
4	PITT	Bernie Barkouskie blocked Dooney's punt out of the end zone for a safety	PITT 22–21

On October 29, the Panthers played their fourth road game of the season in Philadelphia against the Penn Quakers. The Panthers led the intrastate series 9–1–1, but had not played the Quakers since 1932. Coach George Munger's Quakers were 4–0 on the season and ranked #9 by the AP poll. Guard John Schweder received first team AP All-American honors.

The Panthers 39-man traveling squad flew to Philadelphia and housed at the Warwick Hotel. Pitt was an 8-point underdog. Coach Milligan made two changes to the starting lineup. William Gasparovic replaced Robert Plotz at right tackle, and Robert Brennen replaced Bobby Lee at quarterback.

The Panthers dropped the Quakers from the undefeated ranks with a stunning come-from-behind 22–21 victory. Pitt scored in the opening quarter on a 48-yd pass from Bimbo Cecconi to Jimmy Joe Robinson. Nick Bolkovac's extra point sailed wide left. Early in the second quarter, Pitt scored again on a Jim Campbell 1-yard plunge to culminate a 71-yard march. Bolkovac added the point for a 13–0 Pitt lead. Penn quickly answered with a 13-play, 80-yard drive. Raymond Dooney ran in from the nine. Late in the half, William Rhoads caught a 51-yard touchdown pass from Francis Bagnell. Herbert Agocs converted both placements and Penn led 14–13. Early in the third period, the Penn offense added another score. Penn tackle, Doug Reichenbach, intercepted a Cecconi pass on the Panther 38-yard line. On the 13th play Dooney scored from the 1, and Agocs' extra point upped the score to 21–13 in favor of Penn. After an exchange of punts, the Panthers recovered a Snakey Graham fumble on the Penn 30-yard line. Four plays later, Carl DePasqua scored from the 1-yard line, and Bolkovac added the placement to narrow the score to 21–20 at the end of three periods. The final period was a series of fumbles and punts. Late in the game Cecconi returned a punt 50-yards to the Penn 29-yard line. The Panthers advanced the ball to the 1-yard line, and lost the ball on downs. On second down, with 35 seconds remaining, the Quakers' punt was blocked out of the end zone by Bernie Barkouskie, and Pitt was awarded a 2 point safety. Pitt 22 to Penn 21.

This was the last time the Panthers and Quakers would meet on the gridiron. The Quakers finished the season with a 4–4 record.

The Pitt starting lineup for the game against Pennsylvania was Earl Sumpter (left end), Nick Bolkovac (left tackle), Bernie Barkouskie (left guard), Len Radnor (center), Mike Boldin (right guard), William Gaspaovic (right tackle), Nick DeRosa (right end), Robert Brennen (quarterback), Bimbo Cecconi (left halfback), Jimmy Joe Robinson (right halfback) and Carl DePasqua (fullback). Substitutes appearing in the game for Pitt were Ted Geremsky, William Samer, Flint Greene, Ralph Short, Rudy Andabaker, Andy Kisaday, George Radosevich, John Dazio, Donald Karanovich, Charles Yost, Chris Warriner, John Masarik, Louis Melillo, William Hardisty, William Sichko, Lindaro Lauro, Armand DiFonso, Bill Abraham, Bob Becker, Bobby Lee, Robert Bestwick and James Campbell.

=== Ohio State ===
Week 7: Ohio State at Pitt

Team	1	2	3	4	Total
• Ohio State	0	0	14	0	14
Pitt	0	7	3	0	10

- Date: November 5, 1949
- Location: Pitt Stadium
  Pittsburgh, PA
- Game start: 2:00 p.m.
- Game attendance: 54,789
- Game weather: cloudy and cold
- Referee: George Rennix (Minnesota)

Scoring summary
2	PITT	Earl Sumpter 17-yard pass from Carl DePasqua (Nick Bolkovac kick)	PITT 7–0
3	PITT	Bolkovac 28-yard field goal	PITT 10–0
3	OSU	Pandel Savic 1-yard run (Jimmy Hague kick)	PITT 10–7
3	OSU	Ray Hamilton 23-yard run (Hague kick )	OSU 14–10

On November 5, Pitt played Wes Fesler's #11 ranked Ohio State Buckeyes. They were 4–1–1 on the season. A loss to #5Minnesota and a tie with USC were the only blemishes on their record. The Buckeyes led the all-time series with Pitt 9–3–1.

Both teams were missing offensive threats. Ohio sophomore halfback, Vic Janowicz, was injured and did not play. Pitt halfback, Jimmie Robinson was injured in the Penn game and did not play. He was replaced by Armand DiFonso in the starting lineup.

With 54,789 fans looking on, Pitt led 10–0 early in the second half, but the Buckeyes rallied and gave the Panthers their second loss 14–10. The Panthers dominated the first half, but only managed to score one touchdown. Late in the second quarter, Panthers halfback, Bill Sichko returned a punt to the Ohio State 42-yard line. It took the Panthers 8-plays to score, with a 17-yard pass from Carl DePasqua to Earl Sumpter the clincher. Nick Bolkovac added the extra point and Pitt led 7–0 at halftime. The Panthers offense drove to the Ohio State 21-yard line to start the third period. The Buckeyes defense held, and Bolkovac kicked a 28-yard field goal for a 10–0 Pitt lead. The Panthers defense held and forced a punt. Sichko fumbled and the Buckeyes recovered on the Pitt 12-yard line. On the seventh play, Ohio Statecquarterback Pandel Savic scored through the middle from the 1-yard line. James Hague booted the placement to cut the lead to 10–7. State regained possession when halfback Bill Newell intercepted a DePasqua pass on the Ohio 30-yard line. Seven plays later the Buckeyes led 14–10. The fourth quarter was scoreless, as Pitt's offense was kept at bay by the Ohio State defense.

The Pitt starting lineup for the game against Ohio State was Earl Sumpter (left end), Nick Bolkovac (left tackle), Bernie Barkouskie (left guard), Len Radnor (center), Mike Boldin (right guard), William Gaspaovic (right tackle), Nick DeRosa (right end), Robert Brennen (quarterback), Bimbo Cecconi (left halfback), Armand DiFonso (right halfback) and Carl DePasqua (fullback). Substitutes appearing in the game for Pitt were Ted Geremsky, William Samer, Robert Mihm, Larry Pierce, Rudy Andabaker, George Radosevich, Robert Plotz, Donald Karanovich, Chris Warriner, Frank Capello, William Hardisty, William Sichko, Bill Abraham, Bobby Lee, Emil Rader, Robert Bestwick and James Campbell.

=== Minnesota ===
Week 8: Minnesota at Pitt

Team	1	2	3	4	Total
• Minnesota	0	14	0	10	24
Pitt	0	0	7	0	7

- Date: November 12, 1949
- Location: Pitt Stadium
  Pittsburgh, PA
- Game start: 2:00 p.m.
- Game attendance: 42,515
- Game weather: warm
- Referee: Mike Layden (Notre Dame)

Scoring summary
2	MINN	Bill Bye 6-yard run (Gordon Soltau kick)	MINN 7–0
2	MINN	Bye 29-yard run (Soltau kick)	MINN 14–0
3	PITT	Nick DeRosa 21-yard pass from Bimbo Cecconi (Nick Bolkovac kick)	MINN 14–7
4	MINN	Jim Malosky 21-yard pass from Bill Bye (Soltau kick )	MINN 21–0
4	MINN	Soltau 15-yard field goal	MINN 24–7

Bernie Bierman's Minnesota Golden Gophers came to Pittsburgh as 14-point favorites. The Gophers and Panthers had identical 5–2 records, but the AP ranked the Gophers #9 in the country. The Gopher lineup had future Pro Football Hall-of-Famers: end, Bud Grant and tackle, Leo Nomellini, plus consensus All-American center, Clayton Tonnemaker. The Gophers led the all-time series with the Panthers 5–0, and had outscored Pitt 138–17.

In front of 42,515 fans, the Minnesota Gophers extended their win streak to six over the Panthers, as they won 24–7. Minnesota scored two touchdowns in the second period on runs by Bill Bye. Gordon Soltau added the extra points to make the half-time score 14–0. In the third quarter the Panthers managed to score a touchdown that cut the lead to 14–7. The Panthers gained possession on the Gophers 45-yard line, and ran six straight passing plays. Nick DeRosa caught a 21-yard pass from Bimbo Cecconi for the touchdown. Nick Bolkovac booted the placement. In the final quarter, Pitt fumbled on their 16-yard line and Minnesota scored in 2 plays. Bye tossed a 21-yard touchdown pass to Jim Molosky and Soltau added the point. Late in the game, Soltau capped the scoring with a 15-yard field goal.

The Pitt starting lineup for the game against Minnesota was Earl Sumpter (left end), Nick Bolkovac (left tackle), Bernie Barkouskie (left guard), George Radosevich, (center), Mike Boldin (right guard), Robert Plotz (right tackle), Nick DeRosa (right end), Robert Brennen (quarterback), Bimbo Cecconi (left halfback), Armand DiFonso (right halfback) and Carl DePasqua (fullback). Substitutes appearing in the game for Pitt were Ted Geremsky, Robert Mihm, William Samer, Flint Greene, Rudy Andabaker, Len Radnor, John Dazio, Donald Karanovich, William Gasparovic, John Masarik, William Sichko, Lindaro Lauro, Bill Doziski, Jimmy Joe Robinson, Paul Chess, Bill Abraham, Bobby Lee, Robert Bestwick and James Campbell.

=== Penn State ===
Week 9: Penn State at Pitt

Team	1	2	3	4	Total
Penn State	0	0	0	0	0
• Pitt	6	0	7	6	19

- Date: November 19, 1949
- Location: Pitt Stadium
  Pittsburgh, PA
- Game start: 2:00 p.m.
- Game attendance: 43,308–44,571
- Game weather: cloudy and cold
- Referee: Joseph H. Williams (Bucknell)

Scoring summary
1	PITT	Bimbo Cecconi 35-yard run (kick missed)	PITT 6–0
4	PITT	Cecconi 24-yard run ( Nick Bolkovac kick)	PITT 13–0
4	PITT	Jimmy Joe Robinson 58 -yard pass from Cecconi (kick missed )	PITT 19–0

On November 19, the Panthers ended the season with their annual intrastate game against the Penn State Nittany Lions. Penn State, under the direction of first year coach Joe Bedenk, came to the Stadium with a 5–3 record. Pitt led the all-time series 28–18–2. Nineteen Panthers were ending their college football careers. Pitt was favored and wanted one more victory to match their 1948 record of 6–3.

Pitt halfback Bimbo Cecconi starred, both offensively, as he ran for two touchdowns and passed for a third, and defensively, as he intercepted three State passes in a 19–0 shutout of Penn State. In the first quarter, Cecconi intercepted an Owen Dougherty pass on the Panther 5-yard line and returned it to the 23-yard line. Two first downs moved the ball to the State 35-yard line. Carl DePasqua ran through right guard for 10 yards and then lateraled to Cecconi, who did not stop until he crossed the goal line. Nick Bolkovac missed the placement and Pitt led 6–0. Late in the half, Cecconi intercepted a pass by Bill Luther and returned it to the State 14, but the Panthers could not score. After 10 minutes of the third period, the Panthers gained possession on their 29-yard line. On second down halfback Paul Chess caught a swing pass from DePasqua and raced 57-yards to the State 9-yard line. Bimbo scored around end on the next play, and Bolkovac booted the extra point for a 13–0 lead. In the final period, State answered with a drive that went to the Panther 8-yard line. Bimbo intercepted Luther's pass in the end zone for a touchback. Late in the game, Bernie Barkouskie recovered a State fumble on the Pitt 42-yard line. On first down, Cecconi threw a 58-yard touchdown pass to Jimmy Robinson. Bill Abraham missed the placement. Final score 19–0.

The Pitt starting lineup for the game against Penn State was Earl Sumpter (left end), Nick Bolkovac (left tackle), Bernie Barkouskie (left guard), Len Radnor (center), Mike Boldin (right guard), Robert Plotz (right tackle), Nick DeRosa (right end), John Dazio (quarterback), Bimbo Cecconi (left halfback), Armand DiFonso (right halfback) and Carl DePasqua (fullback). Substitutes appearing in the game for Pitt were Ted Geremsky, William Samer, Flint Greene, Rudy Andabaker, Andrew Kisaday, Donald Karanovich, George Radosevich, William Gasparovic, Lindaro Lauro, William Hardisty, Jimmy Joe Robinson, Paul Chess, Bill Abraham, Bobby Lee, Robert Brennen, Joe O'Bara, Robert Bestwick and James Campbell.

== Individual scoring summary ==
1949 Pittsburgh Panthers scoring summary
Player	Touchdowns	Extra points	Field goals	Safety	Points
Jimmie Joe Robinson	7	0	0	0	42
Louis Cecconi	6	0	0	0	36
Nick Bolkovac	0	16	2	0	22
Nick DeRosa	2	0	0	0	12
Carl DePasqua	2	0	0	0	12
John Masarik	1	0	0	0	6
Lindaro Lauro	1	0	0	0	6
Ted Geremsky	1	0	0	0	6
Earl Sumpter	1	0	0	0	6
James Campbell	1	0	0	0	6
Bernie Barkouskie	0	0	0	1	2
Totals	22	16	2	1	156

== Postseason ==
Bernie Barkouskie was named to the 1949 Collier's and Newspaper Editors Association first team, and the Associated Press third team All-America squads.

Carl DePasqua and Bernie Barkouskie were selected to play in the annual New Year's Day Blue-Gray Game in Montgomery, AL.

On December 26, Louis 'Bimbo' Cecconi played in the North-South All-Star game in Miami, FL.

On January 27, 1950, Coach Mike Milligan resigned as head coach of the University of Pittsburgh. The Panthers offered him a contract on a year-by-year basis, but he wanted a three-year deal. His three-year record was 13–14. After a 1–8 first season, his Panthers finished 6–3 the following two years.

== Team players drafted into the NFL ==
The following players were selected in the 1950 NFL draft.

Player	Position	Round	Pick	NFL club
Jimmy Joe Robinson	back	3	39	Cleveland Browns
Bob Plotz	tackle	11	143	Cleveland Browns
Lou Cecconi	back	13	167	San Francisco 49'ers
Bernie Barkouskie	guard	16	204	Pittsburgh Steelers
Carl DePasqua	back	29	372	Pittsburgh Steelers
