= 1949 Saint Vincent Bearcats football team =

American college football season

1949 Saint Vincent Bearcats football

Tangerine Bowl champion

Tangerine Bowl, W 7–6 vs. Emory and Henry
- Conference: Independent
- Record: 10–0
- Head coach: Al DeLuca (2nd season)
- Home stadium: Bearcat Stadium

1949 Eastern college football independents records
	Conf.			Overall
Team	W	L	T	W		L		T
Saint Vincent		–		10	–	0	–	0
No. 4 Army		–		9	–	0	–	0
Gannon		–		8	–	0	–	0
Trinity (CT)		–		8	–	0	–	0
Brown		–		8	–	1	–	0
No. 12 Cornell		–		8	–	1	–	0
No. 13 Villanova		–		8	–	1	–	0
Bucknell		–		6	–	2	–	0
Dartmouth		–		6	–	2	–	0
Buffalo		–		6	–	3	–	0
Pittsburgh		–		6	–	3	–	0
Princeton		–		6	–	3	–	0
Fordham		–		5	–	3	–	0
Tufts		–		5	–	3	–	1
Carnegie Tech		–		5	–	3	–	1
Penn State		–		5	–	4	–	0
Temple		–		5	–	4	–	0
Penn		–		4	–	4	–	0
Yale		–		4	–	4	–	0
Boston College		–		4	–	4	–	1
Syracuse		–		4	–	5	–	0
Drexel		–		3	–	3	–	1
Duquesne		–		3	–	6	–	0
Franklin & Marshall		–		2	–	5	–	2
CCNY		–		2	–	5	–	1
NYU		–		3	–	6	–	0
Columbia		–		2	–	7	–	0
Hofstra		–		1	–	5	–	1
Colgate		–		1	–	8	–	0
Harvard		–		1	–	8	–	0
Rankings from AP Poll

The 1949 Saint Vincent Bearcats football team represented Saint Vincent College as an independent during the 1949 college football season. In head coach Al DeLuca's second year, the Bearcats compiled a 10–0 record, shut out eight of their ten opponents, and outscored their opponents by a total of 234 to 12. 1949 remains the only undefeated season in program history, the best defensive showing with only twelve points allowed, and their second best offensive showing. The Bearcats were invited to the Tangerine Bowl, where they defeated Emory and Henry, which came into the bowl with an 11–0 record.

== Schedule ==
Date	Time	Opponent	Site	Result	Attendance	Source
September 23	8:15 p.m.	Indiana (PA)	Bearcat Stadium; Latrobe, PA	W 26–0	4,500	
October 2		Steubenville	Latrobe, PA	W 34–0		
October 9		Alliance	Latrobe, PA	W 13–0		
October 14		Geneva	Latrobe, PA	W 19–0		
October 22		at Waynesburg	Waynesburg, PA	W 6–0		
October 30		at Saint Francis (PA)	Loretto, PA	W 13–0		
November 4		West Virginia Wesleyan	Latrobe, PA	W 52–6		
November 13		Mount St. Mary's	Latrobe, PA	W 30–0		
November 19		Westminster (PA)	Latrobe, PA	W 34–0	3,000	
January 2		vs. Emory & Henry	Tangerine Bowl; Orlando, FL (Tangerine Bowl)	W 7–6	9,500	
All times are in Eastern time
