= 1949 Penn Quakers football team =

American college football season

1949 Penn Quakers football
- Conference: Independent
- Record: 4–4
- Head coach: George Munger (12th season)
- Home stadium: Franklin Field

1949 Eastern college football independents records
	Conf.			Overall
Team	W	L	T	W		L		T
Saint Vincent		–		10	–	0	–	0
No. 4 Army		–		9	–	0	–	0
Gannon		–		8	–	0	–	0
Trinity (CT)		–		8	–	0	–	0
Brown		–		8	–	1	–	0
No. 12 Cornell		–		8	–	1	–	0
No. 13 Villanova		–		8	–	1	–	0
Bucknell		–		6	–	2	–	0
Dartmouth		–		6	–	2	–	0
Buffalo		–		6	–	3	–	0
Pittsburgh		–		6	–	3	–	0
Princeton		–		6	–	3	–	0
Fordham		–		5	–	3	–	0
Tufts		–		5	–	3	–	1
Carnegie Tech		–		5	–	3	–	1
Penn State		–		5	–	4	–	0
Temple		–		5	–	4	–	0
Penn		–		4	–	4	–	0
Yale		–		4	–	4	–	0
Boston College		–		4	–	4	–	1
Syracuse		–		4	–	5	–	0
Drexel		–		3	–	3	–	1
Duquesne		–		3	–	6	–	0
Franklin & Marshall		–		2	–	5	–	2
CCNY		–		2	–	5	–	1
NYU		–		3	–	6	–	0
Columbia		–		2	–	7	–	0
Hofstra		–		1	–	5	–	1
Colgate		–		1	–	8	–	0
Harvard		–		1	–	8	–	0
Rankings from AP Poll

The 1949 Penn Quakers football team was an American football team that represented the University of Pennsylvania as an independent during the 1949 college football season. In its 12th season under head coach George Munger, the team compiled a 4–4 record and outscored opponents by a total of 159 to 118. The team won its first four games and was ranked No. 9 in the AP Poll before losing its last four games and dropping out of the AP Poll. The team played its home games at Franklin Field in Philadelphia.

== Schedule ==
Date	Opponent	Rank	Site	Result	Attendance	Source
October 1	Dartmouth		Franklin Field; Philadelphia, PA	W 21–0	36,850	
October 8	at Princeton	No. 20	Princeton, NJ (rivalry)	W 14–13	12,000	
October 15	Columbia		Franklin Field; Philadelphia, PA	W 27–7	34,373	
October 22	Navy	No. 14	Franklin Field; Philadelphia, PA	W 28–7	66,125	
October 29	Pittsburgh	No. 9	Franklin Field; Philadelphia, PA	L 21–22	42,663	
November 5	No. 19 Virginia	No. 20	Franklin Field; Philadelphia, PA	L 14–26	50,771	
November 12	No. 2 Army		Franklin Field; Philadelphia, PA	L 13–14	78,000	
November 24	No. 20 Cornell		Franklin Field; Philadelphia, PA (rivalry)	L 21–29	75,000	
Rankings from AP Poll released prior to the game

== Rankings ==
Ranking movements Legend: ██ Increase in ranking ██ Decrease in ranking — = Not ranked т = Tied with team above or below
	Week								
Poll	1	2	3	4	5	6	7	8	Final
AP	20т	—	14	9	20т	—	—	—	—
