= 1949 Penn State Nittany Lions football team =

American college football season

1949 Penn State Nittany Lions football
- Conference: Independent
- Record: 5–4
- Head coach: Joe Bedenk (1st season)
- Captains: Robert C. Hicks; Neg Norton
- Home stadium: New Beaver Field

1949 Eastern college football independents records
	Conf.			Overall
Team	W	L	T	W		L		T
Saint Vincent		–		10	–	0	–	0
No. 4 Army		–		9	–	0	–	0
Gannon		–		8	–	0	–	0
Trinity (CT)		–		8	–	0	–	0
Brown		–		8	–	1	–	0
No. 12 Cornell		–		8	–	1	–	0
No. 13 Villanova		–		8	–	1	–	0
Bucknell		–		6	–	2	–	0
Dartmouth		–		6	–	2	–	0
Buffalo		–		6	–	3	–	0
Pittsburgh		–		6	–	3	–	0
Princeton		–		6	–	3	–	0
Fordham		–		5	–	3	–	0
Tufts		–		5	–	3	–	1
Carnegie Tech		–		5	–	3	–	1
Penn State		–		5	–	4	–	0
Temple		–		5	–	4	–	0
Penn		–		4	–	4	–	0
Yale		–		4	–	4	–	0
Boston College		–		4	–	4	–	1
Syracuse		–		4	–	5	–	0
Drexel		–		3	–	3	–	1
Duquesne		–		3	–	6	–	0
Franklin & Marshall		–		2	–	5	–	2
CCNY		–		2	–	5	–	1
NYU		–		3	–	6	–	0
Columbia		–		2	–	7	–	0
Hofstra		–		1	–	5	–	1
Colgate		–		1	–	8	–	0
Harvard		–		1	–	8	–	0
Rankings from AP Poll

The 1949 Penn State Nittany Lions football team represented the Pennsylvania State University as an independent during the 1949 college football season. The team was coached by Joe Bedenk. He was named head coach after coaching the line for several years. After a single 5–4 season, Bedenk requested a return to coaching the line, and Penn State brought in Rip Engle as head coach The team played its home games in New Beaver Field in State College, Pennsylvania.

== Schedule ==
Date	Opponent	Site	Result	Attendance	Source
September 24	Villanova	New Beaver Field; State College, PA	L 6–27	22,080	
October 1	at Army	Michie Stadium; West Point, NY	L 7–42	27,000	
October 8	Boston College	New Beaver Field; State College, PA	W 32–14	18,041	
October 15	Nebraska^{†}	New Beaver Field; State College, PA	W 22–7	23,956	
October 22	at No. 15 Michigan State	Spartan Stadium; East Lansing, MI (rivalry)	L 0–24	44,746	
October 29	Syracuse	New Beaver Field; State College, PA (rivalry)	W 33–21	18,758	
November 5	at West Virginia	Mountaineer Field; Morgantown, WV (rivalry)	W 34–14	20,000–21,000	
November 12	at Temple	Temple Stadium; Philadelphia, PA	W 28–7	18,000	
November 19	at Pittsburgh	Pitt Stadium; Pittsburgh, PA (rivalry)	L 0–19	43,308–44,571	
^{†}Homecoming; Rankings from AP Poll released prior to the game
