= 1949 Cornell Big Red football team =

American college football season

1949 Cornell Big Red football
- Conference: Independent

Ranking
- AP: No. 12
- Record: 8–1
- Head coach: George K. James (3rd season)
- Home stadium: Schoellkopf Field

1949 Eastern college football independents records
	Conf.			Overall
Team	W	L	T	W		L		T
Saint Vincent		–		10	–	0	–	0
No. 4 Army		–		9	–	0	–	0
Gannon		–		8	–	0	–	0
Trinity (CT)		–		8	–	0	–	0
Brown		–		8	–	1	–	0
No. 12 Cornell		–		8	–	1	–	0
No. 13 Villanova		–		8	–	1	–	0
Bucknell		–		6	–	2	–	0
Dartmouth		–		6	–	2	–	0
Buffalo		–		6	–	3	–	0
Pittsburgh		–		6	–	3	–	0
Princeton		–		6	–	3	–	0
Fordham		–		5	–	3	–	0
Tufts		–		5	–	3	–	1
Carnegie Tech		–		5	–	3	–	1
Penn State		–		5	–	4	–	0
Temple		–		5	–	4	–	0
Penn		–		4	–	4	–	0
Yale		–		4	–	4	–	0
Boston College		–		4	–	4	–	1
Syracuse		–		4	–	5	–	0
Drexel		–		3	–	3	–	1
Duquesne		–		3	–	6	–	0
Franklin & Marshall		–		2	–	5	–	2
CCNY		–		2	–	5	–	1
NYU		–		3	–	6	–	0
Columbia		–		2	–	7	–	0
Hofstra		–		1	–	5	–	1
Colgate		–		1	–	8	–	0
Harvard		–		1	–	8	–	0
Rankings from AP Poll

The 1949 Cornell Big Red football team was an American football team that represented Cornell University during the 1949 college football season. In its third season under head coach George K. James, the team compiled a 8–1 record and outscored their opponents by a total of 284 to 111.

Cornell played its home games in Schoellkopf Field in Ithaca, New York.

Hillary Chollet's performance in the Yale game^{[Note]} prompted Coach James to call it "one of the most brilliant displays of offensive and defensive football I have ever seen." Chollet played about three-quarters of the game on both offense and defense. He gained 54 yards on eleven rushing attempts, 45 receiving three passes, 57 returning two intercepted passes, 31 on two punt returns, and 55 returning the opening kickoff, for a total of 242 yards.

== Schedule ==
Date	Opponent	Rank	Site	Result	Attendance	Source
September 24	Niagara		Schoellkopf Field; Ithaca, NY	W 27–0	15,000	
October 1	Colgate		Schoellkopf Field; Ithaca, NY (rivalry)	W 39–27	20,000	
October 8	at Harvard	No. 17	Harvard Stadium; Boston, MA	W 33–14	24,000	
October 15	at Yale	No. 14	Yale Bowl; New Haven, CT	W 48–14	45,000	
October 22	Princeton	No. 8	Schoellkopf Field; Ithaca, NY	W 14–12	33,500	
October 29	Columbia	No. 8	Schoellkopf Field; Ithaca, NY (rivalry)	W 54–0	25,000	
November 5	Syracuse	No. 7	Schoellkopf Field; Ithaca, NY	W 33–7	33,000	
November 12	at Dartmouth	No. 6	Memorial Stadium; Hanover, NH (rivalry)	L 7–16	17,000	
November 24	at Penn	No. 20	Franklin Field; Philadelphia, PA (rivalry)	W 29–21	75,000	
Rankings from AP Poll released prior to the game

== Rankings ==
Ranking movements Legend: ██ Increase in ranking ██ Decrease in ranking т = Tied with team above or below ( ) = First-place votes
	Week								
Poll	1	2	3	4	5	6	7	8	Final
AP	17	14	8	8	7 (1)	6 (1)	17	20т	12

== Notes ==
^Note Author Bob Kane gets the year wrong, stating it was 1948, when it was actually 1949.
