= 1949 Bucknell Bison football team =

American college football season

1949 Bucknell Bison football
- Conference: Independent
- Record: 6–2
- Head coach: Harry Lawrence (3rd season)
- Captains: Don Davidson; Edward J. Stec
- Home stadium: Memorial Stadium

1949 Eastern college football independents records
| | Conf. | | | Overall |
| Team | W | L | T | W | | L | | T |
|---|---|---|---|---|---|---|---|---|
| Saint Vincent | | – | | 10 | – | 0 | – | 0 |
| No. 4 Army | | – | | 9 | – | 0 | – | 0 |
| Gannon | | – | | 8 | – | 0 | – | 0 |
| Trinity (CT) | | – | | 8 | – | 0 | – | 0 |
| Brown | | – | | 8 | – | 1 | – | 0 |
| No. 12 Cornell | | – | | 8 | – | 1 | – | 0 |
| No. 13 Villanova | | – | | 8 | – | 1 | – | 0 |
| Bucknell | | – | | 6 | – | 2 | – | 0 |
| Dartmouth | | – | | 6 | – | 2 | – | 0 |
| Buffalo | | – | | 6 | – | 3 | – | 0 |
| Pittsburgh | | – | | 6 | – | 3 | – | 0 |
| Princeton | | – | | 6 | – | 3 | – | 0 |
| Fordham | | – | | 5 | – | 3 | – | 0 |
| Tufts | | – | | 5 | – | 3 | – | 1 |
| Carnegie Tech | | – | | 5 | – | 3 | – | 1 |
| Penn State | | – | | 5 | – | 4 | – | 0 |
| Temple | | – | | 5 | – | 4 | – | 0 |
| Penn | | – | | 4 | – | 4 | – | 0 |
| Yale | | – | | 4 | – | 4 | – | 0 |
| Boston College | | – | | 4 | – | 4 | – | 1 |
| Syracuse | | – | | 4 | – | 5 | – | 0 |
| Drexel | | – | | 3 | – | 3 | – | 1 |
| Duquesne | | – | | 3 | – | 6 | – | 0 |
| Franklin & Marshall | | – | | 2 | – | 5 | – | 2 |
| CCNY | | – | | 2 | – | 5 | – | 1 |
| NYU | | – | | 3 | – | 6 | – | 0 |
| Columbia | | – | | 2 | – | 7 | – | 0 |
| Hofstra | | – | | 1 | – | 5 | – | 1 |
| Colgate | | – | | 1 | – | 8 | – | 0 |
| Harvard | | – | | 1 | – | 8 | – | 0 |
Rankings from AP Poll

The 1949 Bucknell Bison football team was an American football team that represented Bucknell University as an independent during the 1949 college football season.

In its third season under head coach Harry Lawrence, the team compiled a 6–2 record. Edward J. Stec and Don Davidson were the team captains.

The team played its home games at Memorial Stadium on the university campus in Lewisburg, Pennsylvania.

== Schedule ==
| Date | Opponent | Site | Result | Attendance | Source |
|---|---|---|---|---|---|
| October 1 | NYU | Memorial Stadium; Lewisburg, PA | W 14–0 | 6,500 | |
| October 8 | Delaware | Memorial Stadium; Lewisburg, PA | W 13–7 | 5,500 | |
| October 14 | at Temple | Temple Stadium; Philadelphia, PA | L 19–20 | 15,000 | |
| October 22 | Washington & Jefferson^{†} | Memorial Stadium; Lewisburg, PA | W 62–0 | 9,000 | |
| October 29 | at Buffalo | Civic Stadium; Buffalo, NY | W 21–7 | 5,250 | |
| November 5 | at Gettysburg | Musselman Stadium; Gettysburg, PA | L 33–34 | 5,500 | |
| November 12 | at Lafayette | Fisher Field; Easton, PA | W 21–14 | 6,000 | |
| November 19 | Muhlenberg | Memorial Stadium; Lewisburg, PA | W 32–14 | 7,500 | |
^{†}Homecoming
