= 1949 Rutgers Queensmen football team =

American college football season

1949 Rutgers Queensmen football

Middle Three champion
- Conference: Middle Three Conference
- Record: 6–3 (2–0 Middle Three)
- Head coach: Harvey Harman (8th season)
- Captain: Earl Read
- Home stadium: Rutgers Stadium

1949 Middle Three Conference football standings
	Conf.					Overall
Team	W		L		T	W		L		T
Rutgers $	2	–	0	–	0	6	–	3	–	0
Lafayette	1	–	1	–	0	2	–	6	–	0
Lehigh	0	–	2	–	0	6	–	3	–	0
$ – Conference champion

The 1949 Rutgers Queensmen football team represented Rutgers University in the 1949 college football season. In their eighth season under head coach Harvey Harman, the Queensmen compiled a 6–3 record, won the Middle Three Conference championship, and outscored their opponents 266 to 138.

== Schedule ==
Date	Opponent	Site	Result	Attendance	Source
September 24	Merchant Marine*	Rutgers Stadium; Piscataway, NJ	W 79–6	8,200	
October 1	at Temple*	Temple Stadium; Philadelphia, PA	L 7–14	10,000	
October 8	Lehigh	Rutgers Stadium; Piscataway, NJ	W 40–27	14,500	
October 15	Syracuse*	Rutgers Stadium; Piscataway, NJ	L 9–21	12,000	
October 22	at Colgate*	Colgate Athletic Field; Hamilton, NY	W 35–13	7,000	
October 29	at Princeton*	Palmer Stadium; Princeton, NJ (rivalry)	L 14–34	37,000	
November 5	at Lafayette	Fisher Field; Easton, PA	W 14–0	8,500	
November 12	NYU*	Rutgers Stadium; Piscataway, NJ	W 33–9	7,000	
November 19	Fordham*	Rutgers Stadium; Piscataway, NJ	W 35–14	18,000	
*Non-conference game
