= 1949 Fordham Rams football team =

American college football season

1949 Fordham Rams football
- Conference: Independent
- Record: 5–3
- Head coach: Ed Danowski (4th season)
- Home stadium: Polo Grounds

1949 Eastern college football independents records
	Conf.			Overall
Team	W	L	T	W		L		T
Saint Vincent		–		10	–	0	–	0
No. 4 Army		–		9	–	0	–	0
Gannon		–		8	–	0	–	0
Trinity (CT)		–		8	–	0	–	0
Brown		–		8	–	1	–	0
No. 12 Cornell		–		8	–	1	–	0
No. 13 Villanova		–		8	–	1	–	0
Bucknell		–		6	–	2	–	0
Dartmouth		–		6	–	2	–	0
Buffalo		–		6	–	3	–	0
Pittsburgh		–		6	–	3	–	0
Princeton		–		6	–	3	–	0
Fordham		–		5	–	3	–	0
Tufts		–		5	–	3	–	1
Carnegie Tech		–		5	–	3	–	1
Penn State		–		5	–	4	–	0
Temple		–		5	–	4	–	0
Penn		–		4	–	4	–	0
Yale		–		4	–	4	–	0
Boston College		–		4	–	4	–	1
Syracuse		–		4	–	5	–	0
Drexel		–		3	–	3	–	1
Duquesne		–		3	–	6	–	0
Franklin & Marshall		–		2	–	5	–	2
CCNY		–		2	–	5	–	1
NYU		–		3	–	6	–	0
Columbia		–		2	–	7	–	0
Hofstra		–		1	–	5	–	1
Colgate		–		1	–	8	–	0
Harvard		–		1	–	8	–	0
Rankings from AP Poll

The 1949 Fordham Rams football team represented Fordham University as an independent during the 1949 college football season. The Army Cadets hosted Vince Lombardi's former team, the Fordham Rams at Michie Stadium. One of the members of the Rams was Vince's brother, Joe Lombardi, who transferred to the school after Lombardi left. Tim Cohane, writer of Look magazine was a Fordham alumnus, and a friend of Army coach Earl Blaik. He pressured both teams to play each other. Cohane felt the game would help Fordham rise to national prominence. Herb Seidell, the Fordham captain, lost a tooth in the game. Several fights ensued and the media named the match, the Donnybrook on the Hudson. There were multiple penalties for unnecessary roughness.

== Schedule ==
Date	Opponent	Rank	Site	Result	Attendance	Source
October 8	at Merchant Marine		Tomb Field; Kings Point, NY	W 48–0	6,000	
October 15	at Scranton		Dunmore High School Stadium; Dunmore, PA	W 33–13	8,000	
October 22	Syracuse		Polo Grounds; New York, NY	W 47–21	18,613	
October 29	Georgetown		Polo Grounds; New York, NY	W 42–0	25,000	
November 5	at No. 2 Army	No. 20	Michie Stadium; West Point, NY	L 0–35	27,100	
November 12	at Boston College		Braves Field; Boston, MA	L 12–20	15,798	
November 19	at Rutgers		Rutgers Stadium; Piscataway, NJ	L 14–35	18,000	
November 26	NYU		Polo Grounds; New York, NY	W 34–6	17,114	
Rankings from AP Poll released prior to the game

== Rankings ==
Ranking movements Legend: ██ Increase in ranking ██ Decrease in ranking — = Not ranked т = Tied with team above or below
	Week								
Poll	1	2	3	4	5	6	7	8	Final
AP	—	—	—	—	20т	—	—	—	—
