= 1949 Army Cadets football team =

American college football season

1949 Army Cadets football

Eastern champion
- Conference: Independent

Ranking
- AP: No. 4
- Record: 9–0
- Head coach: Earl Blaik (9th season)
- Offensive scheme: T formation
- Captain: John Trent
- Home stadium: Michie Stadium

1949 Eastern college football independents records
	Conf.			Overall
Team	W	L	T	W		L		T
Saint Vincent		–		10	–	0	–	0
No. 4 Army		–		9	–	0	–	0
Gannon		–		8	–	0	–	0
Trinity (CT)		–		8	–	0	–	0
Brown		–		8	–	1	–	0
No. 12 Cornell		–		8	–	1	–	0
No. 13 Villanova		–		8	–	1	–	0
Bucknell		–		6	–	2	–	0
Dartmouth		–		6	–	2	–	0
Buffalo		–		6	–	3	–	0
Pittsburgh		–		6	–	3	–	0
Princeton		–		6	–	3	–	0
Fordham		–		5	–	3	–	0
Tufts		–		5	–	3	–	1
Carnegie Tech		–		5	–	3	–	1
Penn State		–		5	–	4	–	0
Temple		–		5	–	4	–	0
Penn		–		4	–	4	–	0
Yale		–		4	–	4	–	0
Boston College		–		4	–	4	–	1
Syracuse		–		4	–	5	–	0
Drexel		–		3	–	3	–	1
Duquesne		–		3	–	6	–	0
Franklin & Marshall		–		2	–	5	–	2
CCNY		–		2	–	5	–	1
NYU		–		3	–	6	–	0
Columbia		–		2	–	7	–	0
Hofstra		–		1	–	5	–	1
Colgate		–		1	–	8	–	0
Harvard		–		1	–	8	–	0
Rankings from AP Poll

The 1949 Army Cadets football team represented the United States Military Academy as an independent during the 1949 college football season. The Cadets scored 354 points, while the defense allowed only 68 points. Arnold Galiffa was the starting quarterback, ahead of Earl Blaik's son, Bob. Johnny Trent was the team captain. The Cadets won the Lambert-Meadowlands Trophy as the best college team in the East. At season's end, Red Blaik confessed that he thoughts of retiring.

== Schedule ==
Date	Opponent	Rank	Site	Result	Attendance	Source
September 24	Davidson		Michie Stadium; West Point, NY	W 47–7		
October 1	Penn State		Michie Stadium; West Point, NY	W 47–7	27,000	
October 8	at No. 1 Michigan	No. 7	Michigan Stadium; Ann Arbor, MI	W 21–7	97,239	
October 15	at Harvard	No. 2	Harvard Stadium; Boston, MA	W 54–14	46,000	
October 22	Columbia	No. 2	Michie Stadium; West Point, NY	W 63–6	27,100	
October 29	VMI	No. 2	Michie Stadium; West Point, NY	W 40–14	15,555	
November 5	No. 20 Fordham	No. 2	Michie Stadium; West Point, NY	W 35–0	27,100	
November 12	at Penn	No. 2	Franklin Field; Philadelphia, PA	W 14–13	78,000	
November 26	vs. Navy	No. 4	Philadelphia Municipal Stadium; Philadelphia, PA (Army–Navy Game)	W 38–0		
Rankings from AP Poll released prior to the game

== Rankings ==
Ranking movements Legend: ██ Increase in ranking ██ Decrease in ranking ( ) = First-place votes
	Week								
Poll	1	2	3	4	5	6	7	8	Final
AP	7 (1)	2 (58)	2 (10)	2 (12)	2 (10)	2 (13)	4 (1)	4 (1)	4 (12)

== Offseason ==
Sid Gillman left Army to become the head coach for the University of Cincinnati. Head coach Red Blaik interviewed Vince Lombardi, but harbored doubts that Lombardi's background as a high school coach would prepare him for the job.

Besides Lombardi, Murray Warmath of Tennessee was the other new face on the coaching staff. Lombardi would focus on offense, while Warmath worked on the defense. They were the only civilian coaches on the staff. In November 1934, Lombardi (with Fordham) faced off against Warmath (playing for Tennessee) with Fordham winning the game 13–12. The other members of the staff included Doug Kenna, Paul Amen, and John Sauer.

== Accusations of dirty play ==
There were accusations that Army played dirty. Against the University of Michigan, Wolverine's halfback Chuck Ortmann was knocked unconscious. The accusation was that Army player Gil Stephenson kicked him. The matter was escalated when Michigan professor of geology, WH Hobbs was interviewed by the Michigan Daily and commented on the play. The press continued to establish Army's notoriety as bullies after convincing wins over Harvard 54–14, and Columbia 63-6. Army hosted Vince Lombardi's former team, the Fordham Rams at Michie Stadium. One of the members of the Rams was Vince's brother, Joe Lombardi, who transferred to the school after Lombardi left. Tim Cohane, writer of Look Magazine was a Fordham alumnus, and a friend of Army coach Red Blaik. He pressured both teams to play each other. Cohane felt the game would help Fordham rise to national prominence. Herb Seidell, the Fordham captain, lost a tooth in the game. Several fights ensued and the media named the match, the Donnybrook on the Hudson. There were multiple penalties for unnecessary roughness.
