= 1949 Princeton Tigers football team =

American college football season

1949 Princeton Tigers football
- Conference: Independent

Ranking
- AP: No. 18
- Record: 6–3
- Head coach: Charlie Caldwell (5th season)
- Home stadium: Palmer Stadium

1949 Eastern college football independents records
	Conf.			Overall
Team	W	L	T	W		L		T
Saint Vincent		–		10	–	0	–	0
No. 4 Army		–		9	–	0	–	0
Gannon		–		8	–	0	–	0
Trinity (CT)		–		8	–	0	–	0
Brown		–		8	–	1	–	0
No. 12 Cornell		–		8	–	1	–	0
No. 13 Villanova		–		8	–	1	–	0
Bucknell		–		6	–	2	–	0
Dartmouth		–		6	–	2	–	0
Buffalo		–		6	–	3	–	0
Pittsburgh		–		6	–	3	–	0
Princeton		–		6	–	3	–	0
Fordham		–		5	–	3	–	0
Tufts		–		5	–	3	–	1
Carnegie Tech		–		5	–	3	–	1
Penn State		–		5	–	4	–	0
Temple		–		5	–	4	–	0
Penn		–		4	–	4	–	0
Yale		–		4	–	4	–	0
Boston College		–		4	–	4	–	1
Syracuse		–		4	–	5	–	0
Drexel		–		3	–	3	–	1
Duquesne		–		3	–	6	–	0
Franklin & Marshall		–		2	–	5	–	2
CCNY		–		2	–	5	–	1
NYU		–		3	–	6	–	0
Columbia		–		2	–	7	–	0
Hofstra		–		1	–	5	–	1
Colgate		–		1	–	8	–	0
Harvard		–		1	–	8	–	0
Rankings from AP Poll

The 1949 Princeton Tigers football team was an American football team that represented Princeton University as an independent during the 1949 college football season. In its fourth season under head coach Charlie Caldwell, the team compiled a 6–3 record, outscored opponents by a total of 192 to 137, and was ranked No. 18 in the final AP Poll. Princeton played its 1949 home games at Palmer Stadium in Princeton, New Jersey.

== Schedule ==
Date	Opponent	Site	Result	Attendance	Source
September 24	Lafayette	Palmer Stadium; Princeton, NJ	W 26–14	8,200	
October 1	vs. Navy	Municipal Stadium; Baltimore, MD	L 7–28	36,736	
October 8	No. 20 Penn	Palmer Stadium; Princeton, NJ (rivalry)	L 13–14	12,000	
October 15	Brown	Palmer Stadium; Princeton, NJ	W 27–14	24,000	
October 22	at No. 8 Cornell	Schoellkopf Field; Ithaca, NY	L 12–14	33,500	
October 29	Rutgers	Palmer Stadium; Princeton, NJ (rivalry)	W 34–14	37,000	
November 5	at Harvard	Harvard Stadium; Boston, MA (rivalry)	W 33–13	28,000	
November 12	Yale	Palmer Stadium; Princeton, NJ (rivalry)	W 21–13	45,000	
November 19	No. 14 Dartmouth	Palmer Stadium; Princeton, NJ	W 19–13	40,000	
Rankings from AP Poll released prior to the game

== Rankings ==
Ranking movements Legend: ██ Increase in ranking ██ Decrease in ranking — = Not ranked
	Week								
Poll	1	2	3	4	5	6	7	8	Final
AP	—	—	—	—	—	—	—	—	18
