= 1949 Villanova Wildcats football team =

American college football season

1949 Villanova Wildcats football
- Conference: Independent

Ranking
- AP: No. 13
- Record: 8–1
- Head coach: Jim Leonard (1st season)
- Captain: Daniel Brown
- Home stadium: Franklin Field, Shibe Park, Villanova Stadium

1949 Eastern college football independents records
	Conf.			Overall
Team	W	L	T	W		L		T
Saint Vincent		–		10	–	0	–	0
No. 4 Army		–		9	–	0	–	0
Gannon		–		8	–	0	–	0
Trinity (CT)		–		8	–	0	–	0
Brown		–		8	–	1	–	0
No. 12 Cornell		–		8	–	1	–	0
No. 13 Villanova		–		8	–	1	–	0
Bucknell		–		6	–	2	–	0
Dartmouth		–		6	–	2	–	0
Buffalo		–		6	–	3	–	0
Pittsburgh		–		6	–	3	–	0
Princeton		–		6	–	3	–	0
Fordham		–		5	–	3	–	0
Tufts		–		5	–	3	–	1
Carnegie Tech		–		5	–	3	–	1
Penn State		–		5	–	4	–	0
Temple		–		5	–	4	–	0
Penn		–		4	–	4	–	0
Yale		–		4	–	4	–	0
Boston College		–		4	–	4	–	1
Syracuse		–		4	–	5	–	0
Drexel		–		3	–	3	–	1
Duquesne		–		3	–	6	–	0
Franklin & Marshall		–		2	–	5	–	2
CCNY		–		2	–	5	–	1
NYU		–		3	–	6	–	0
Columbia		–		2	–	7	–	0
Hofstra		–		1	–	5	–	1
Colgate		–		1	–	8	–	0
Harvard		–		1	–	8	–	0
Rankings from AP Poll

The 1949 Villanova Wildcats football team represented the Villanova University during the 1949 college football season. The head coach was Jim Leonard, coaching his first season with the Wildcats. The team played their home games at Villanova Stadium in Villanova, Pennsylvania.

== Schedule ==
Date	Opponent	Rank	Site	Result	Attendance	Source
September 17	at Texas A&M		Kyle Field; College Station, TX	W 35–0	29,000	
September 24	at Penn State		New Beaver Field; State College, PA	W 27–6	22,080	
September 30	at Detroit		University of Detroit Stadium; Detroit, MI	W 34–7	22,951	
October 7	Saint Mary's	No. 16	Shibe Park; Philadelphia, PA	W 28–20	14,632	
October 14	Tulsa	No. 17	Villanova Stadium; Villanova, PA	L 19–21	12,000	
October 22	at Duquesne		Forbes Field; Pittsburgh, PA	W 20–0	14,702	
October 28	at Boston College		Braves Field; Boston, MA	W 28–14	25,789	
November 5	at Georgetown		Griffith Stadium; Washington, DC	W 29–14	11,071	
November 19	NC State		Franklin Field; Philadelphia, PA	W 45–21	23,000	
Rankings from AP Poll released prior to the game

== Rankings ==
Ranking movements Legend: ██ Increase in ranking ██ Decrease in ranking — = Not ranked ( ) = First-place votes
	Week								
Poll	1	2	3	4	5	6	7	8	Final
AP	16	17	—	—	—	—	—	16	13 (2)
