= 1949 college football rankings =

- Season: 1949
- Bowl season: 1949–50 bowl games
- End of season champions: Notre Dame

One human poll comprised the 1949 college football rankings. Unlike most sports, college football's governing body, the NCAA, does not bestow a national championship, instead that title is bestowed by one or more different polling agencies. There are two main weekly polls that begin in the preseason—the AP Poll and the Coaches' Poll. The Coaches' Poll began operation in 1950; in addition, the AP Poll did not begin conducting preseason polls until that same year.

== Legend ==
	Increase in ranking
	Decrease in ranking
	Not ranked previous week
	National champion
(#–#)	Win–loss record
(Italics)	Number of first place votes
т	Tied with team above or below also with this symbol

== AP Poll ==
The final AP Poll was released on November 28, at the end of the 1949 regular season, weeks before the major bowls. The AP would not release a post-bowl season final poll regularly until 1968.

	Week 1 Oct 3	Week 2 Oct 10	Week 3 Oct 17	Week 4 Oct 24	Week 5 Oct 31	Week 6 Nov 7	Week 7 Nov 14	Week 8 Nov 21	Week 9 (Final) Nov 28	
1.	Michigan (2–0) (34)	Notre Dame (3–0) (67)	Notre Dame (4–0) (146)	Notre Dame (4–0) (120)	Notre Dame (5–0) (133)	Notre Dame (6–0) (137)	Notre Dame (7–0) (140)	Notre Dame (8–0) (113)	Notre Dame (9–0) (172)	1.
2.	Notre Dame (2–0) (15)	Army (3–0) (58)	Army (4–0) (10)	Army (5–0) (12)	Army (6–0) (10)	Army (7–0) (13)	Oklahoma (8–0) (15)	California (10–0) (24)	Oklahoma (10–0) (18)	2.
3.	Oklahoma (2–0) (17)	Oklahoma (3–0) (28)	Minnesota (4–0) (8)	Oklahoma (5–0) (10)	Oklahoma (6–0) (11)	Oklahoma (7–0) (9)	California (9–0) (5)	Oklahoma (9–0) (11)	California (10–0)	3.
4.	Tulane (2–0) (4)	Tulane (3–0) (1)	Oklahoma (4–0) (6)	California (6–0)	California (7–0) (4)	California (8–0) (3)	Army (8–0) (1)	Army (8–0) (1)	Army (9–0) (12)	4.
5.	Minnesota (2–0) (2)	Minnesota (3–0) (6)	California (5–0)	Rice (4–1)	Michigan (4–2)	Michigan (5–2)	Michigan (6–2)	Ohio State (6–1–2)	Rice (9–1)	5.
6.	North Carolina (2–0) (3)	North Carolina (3–0) (3)	North Carolina (4–0) (6)	Michigan (3–2)	Baylor (6–0)	Cornell (7–0) (1)	Rice (7–1)	Michigan (6–2–1)	Ohio State (6–1–2)	6.
7.	Army (2–0) (1)	Michigan (2–1)	Kentucky (5–0) (3)	Minnesota (4–1)	Cornell (6–0) (1)	Rice (6–1)	Ohio State (6–1–1)	Rice (8–1)	Michigan (6–2–1)	7.
8.	USC (2–0)	Kentucky (4–0) (8)	Cornell (4–0)	Cornell (5–0)	Rice (5–1)	Michigan State (5–2)	Minnesota (6–2)	Minnesota (7–2)	Minnesota (7–2)	8.
9.	SMU (2–0)	California (4–0)	Rice (3–1)	Penn (4–0)	SMU (4–1)	Minnesota (5–2)	Virginia (7–0) (1)	Baylor (8–1)	LSU (8–2)	9.
10.	California (3–0)	SMU (2–0) (1)	Texas (4–1)	Baylor (5–0)	Michigan State (5–1) (2)	Virginia (7–0)	SMU (5–1–1)	Tulane (7–1–1)	Pacific (10–0) (4)	10.
11.	Ohio State (2–0)	Ohio State (2–0–1)	Baylor (4–0)	SMU (3–1)	Ohio State (4–1–1)	Ohio State (5–1–1)	Kentucky (8–1)	Pacific (9–0) (2)	Kentucky (9–2)	11.
12.	Texas (3–0)	USC (2–0–1)	Michigan (2–2)	Michigan State (4–1) (1)	USC (4–1–1)	SMU (4–1–1)	Stanford (6–2–1)	Stanford (6–3–1)	Cornell (8–1)	12.
13.	Michigan State (2–0)	UCLA (4–0)	Northwestern (2–2)	North Carolina (4–1)	Kentucky (6–1)	Texas (5–3)	LSU (6–2)	LSU (7–2)	Villanova (8–1) (2)	13.
14.	Duke (2–0) (3)	Cornell (3–0)	Penn (3–0)	Kentucky (5–1)	Tennessee (4–1–1)	Kentucky (7–1)	Dartmouth (6–1)	Santa Clara (7–2–1)	Maryland (7–1)	14.
15.	Kentucky (3–0) (1)	Pittsburgh (3–0)	Michigan State (3–1)	USC (3–1–1)	Iowa (4–2)	Boston (6–0)	Baylor (7–1)	Maryland (6–1)	Santa Clara (7–2–1)	15.
16.	Villanova (3–0)	Texas (3–1)	Pittsburgh (4–0)	Missouri (3–2)	Duke (5–1)	LSU (5–2)	Maryland (6–1)	Villanova (8–1)	North Carolina (7–3)	16.
17.	Cornell (2–0)	Villanova (4–0)	SMU (2–1)	LSU (3–2)	LSU (4–2)	Stanford (5–2–1)	Cornell (7–1)	USC (5–2–1)	Tennessee (7–2–1)	17.
18.	UCLA (3–0)	Navy (2–1)	Missouri (2–2)	Ohio State (3–1–1)	Boston University (5–0)	Wake Forest (4–4)	Michigan State (5–3)	Tennessee (6–2–1)	Princeton (6–3)	18.
19.	Pittsburgh (2–0)	Michigan State (2–1)	USC (2–1–1)	Texas (4–2)	Virginia (6–0)	Pacific (7–0)	Santa Clara (7–1–1) т	North Carolina (6–3)	Michigan State (6–3)	19.
20.	Missouri (0–2) т; Northwestern (1–1) т; Penn (2–0) т	Baylor (3–0)	Tulane (3–1)	UCLA (5–1)	Fordham (4–0) т; Penn (4–1) т	Santa Clara (6–1–1)	Tulane (6–1–1) т	Cornell (7–1) т; Kentucky (8–2) т	Baylor (8–2) т; Missouri (7–3) т	20.
	Week 1 Oct 3	Week 2 Oct 10	Week 3 Oct 17	Week 4 Oct 24	Week 5 Oct 31	Week 6 Nov 7	Week 7 Nov 14	Week 8 Nov 21	Week 9 (Final) Nov 28	
		Dropped: Duke; Missouri; Northwestern; Penn	Dropped: Navy; Ohio State; UCLA; Villanova	Dropped: Northwestern; Pittsburgh; Tulane	Dropped: Minnesota; Missouri; North Carolina; Texas; UCLA	Dropped: Baylor; Duke; Fordham; Iowa; Penn; Tennessee; USC	Dropped: Boston; Pacific; Texas; Wake Forest	Dropped: Dartmouth; Michigan State; SMU; Virginia	Dropped: Stanford; Tulane; USC	

== Litkenhous Ratings ==
The final Litkenhous Ratings released in December 1949 ranked the following as the top 100 teams:

1. Notre Dame (10–0)
2. California (10–1)
3. Oklahoma (11–0)
4. Minnesota (7–2)
5. Stanford (7–3–1)
6. Army (9–0)
7. Michigan (6–2–1)
8. Ohio State (7–1–2)
9. Michigan State
10. USC (5–3–1)
11. Wisconsin (5–3–1)
12. Rice (10–1)
13. Kentucky (9–3)
14. LSU (8–3)
15. Texas (6–4)
16. UCLA (6–3)
17. SMU (5–4–1)
18. Baylor (8–2)
19. Tulane (7–2–1)
20. Illinois (3–4–2)
21. Maryland (9–1)
22. Purdue (4–5)
23. Missouri (7–4)
24. Northwestern (4–5)
25. Pacific (11–0)
26. Oregon State (7–3)
27. Tennessee (7–2–1)
28. Villanova (8–1)
29. Iowa (4–5)
30. Santa Clara (8–2–1)
31. Duke (6–3)
32. San Francisco (7–3)
33. TCU (6–3–1)
34. Oregon (4–6)
35. Georgia Tech (7–3)
36. Alabama (6–3–1)
37. Pittsburgh (6–3)
38. Arkansas (5–5)
39. North Carolina (7–4)
40. Miami (FL) (6–3)
41. Kansas (5–5)
42. Xavier (10–1)
43. Miami (OH) (5–4)
44. Penn (4–4)
45. Georgia (4–6–1)
46. Vanderbilt (5–5)
47. Boston University (6–2)
48. Washington (3–7)
49. Iowa State (5–3–1)
50. William & Mary (6–4)
51. Virginia (7–2)
52. Dayton (6–3)
53. Cincinnati (7–4)
54. Cornell (8–1)
55. Indiana (1–8)
56. Ole Miss (4–5–1)
57. Navy (3–5–1)
58. Wyoming (9–1)
59. Boston College (4–4–1)
60. Penn State (5–4)
61. Wake Forest (4–6)
62. St. Bonaventure (6–3)
63. Princeton (6–3)
64. San Jose State (9–4)
65. Washington State (3–6)
66. Nebraska (4–5)
67. Nevada (5–5)
68. Oklahoma A&M (4–4–2)
69. Texas A&M (1–8–1)
70. Auburn (2–4–3)
71. Florida (4–5–1)
72. Texas Tech (7–5)
73. Hardin Simmons (6–4–1)
74. Brown (8–1)
75. South Carolina (4–6)
76. Rutgers (6–3)
77. Texas Western (8–2–1)
78. Dartmouth (6–2)
79. McMurry
80. Louisville (8–3)
81. Hardin (10–1)
82. North Texas (8–4)
83. Saint Mary's (3–6–1)
84. Detroit (5–4)
85. Houston (5–4–1)
86. Fordham (5–3)
87. Tulsa (5–5–1)
88. Marquette (4–5)
89. Memphis State (9–1)
90. Loyola [Los Angeles] (6–4)
91. Tyler (10–1)
92. John Carroll (6–3)
93. Kansas State (2–8)
94. West Texas (5–4)
95. Clemson (4–4–2)
96. Syracuse (4–5)
97. Mississippi Southern (0–8–1)
98. Bucknell (6–2)
99. Idaho (3–5)
100. Delaware (8–1)

== Pittsburgh Courier ==
The Pittsburgh Courier, a leading African American newspaper, ranked the top 1949 teams from historically black colleges and universities using the Dickinson System in an era when college football was largely segregated. The rankings were published on December 10.

- 1. Morgan State (8–0)
- 2. Southern (10–0–1), West Virginia State (8–0–1)
- 4. Tennessee A&M (9–1)
- 5. Florida A&M (7–2)
- 6. Maryland State (8–0), Shaw (7–2), North Carolina A&T (7–2)
- 9. Langston (8–1–1)
- 10. Benedict (6–1)
- 11. Grambling (7–3–2)
- 12. Fisk (6–2)
- 13. Prairie View A&M (7–3), Hampton (5–3)
- 15. Alcorn A&M (7–1–2)
- 16. Alabama A&M (5–2–2), Bethune–Cookman (5–3), Kentucky State (6–4), Wilberforce State (5–4)
- 20. Fort Valley State (5–3–1)
- 21. Virginia State (4–2–1)
- 22. Howard (7–2)
- 23. Clark (4–4)
- 24. North Carolina College (4–4)
- 25. Arkansas AM&N (5–4–2), St. Augustine's (6–2)
- 27. Morris Brown (6–3–1), Bishop (4–3–1), Morristown (6–3–1)

== See also ==
- 1949 College Football All-America Team
