= 1949 Maryland Terrapins football team =

American college football season

1949 Maryland Terrapins football

Gator Bowl champion

Gator Bowl, W 20–7 vs. Missouri
- Conference: Southern Conference

Ranking
- AP: No. 14
- Record: 9–1 (4–0 SoCon)
- Head coach: Jim Tatum (3rd season)
- Offensive scheme: Split-T
- Captain: Fred Davis
- Home stadium: Byrd Stadium (original)

1949 Southern Conference football standings
	Conf.					Overall
Team	W		L		T	W		L		T
No. 16 North Carolina $	5	–	0	–	0	7	–	4	–	0
No. 14 Maryland	4	–	0	–	0	9	–	1	–	0
Washington and Lee	3	–	1	–	1	3	–	5	–	1
Duke	4	–	2	–	0	6	–	3	–	0
William & Mary	4	–	2	–	0	6	–	4	–	0
VMI	3	–	2	–	1	3	–	5	–	1
The Citadel	2	–	2	–	0	4	–	5	–	0
Clemson	2	–	2	–	0	4	–	4	–	2
Furman	3	–	3	–	0	3	–	6	–	0
South Carolina	3	–	3	–	0	4	–	6	–	0
Wake Forest	3	–	3	–	0	4	–	6	–	0
George Washington	2	–	3	–	0	4	–	5	–	0
NC State	3	–	6	–	0	3	–	7	–	0
VPI	1	–	5	–	2	1	–	7	–	2
Richmond	2	–	6	–	0	3	–	7	–	0
Davidson	1	–	5	–	0	2	–	8	–	0
$ – Conference champion; Rankings from AP Poll

The 1949 Maryland Terrapins football team represented the University of Maryland in 1949 college football season as a member of the Southern Conference (SoCon). Jim Tatum served as the head coach for the third season of his nine-year tenure. The team compiled a 9–1 record and received a bid to the 1950 Gator Bowl, where they defeated 20th-ranked Missouri, which was coached by Don Faurot, Tatum's former boss and the inventor of the split-T offense.

== Schedule ==
Date	Time	Opponent	Rank	Site	Result	Attendance	Source
September 24		at VPI		Miles Stadium; Blacksburg, VA	W 34–7	10,000–12,000	
September 30		Georgetown*		Byrd Stadium; College Park, MD	W 40–14	18,227	
October 8		at No. 13 Michigan State*		Macklin Stadium; East Lansing, MI	L 7–14	32,080	
October 22		at NC State		Riddick Stadium; Raleigh, NC	W 14–6	15,000	
October 29		South Carolina^{†}		Byrd Stadium; College Park, MD	W 44–7	17,762	
November 5		George Washington		Byrd Stadium; College Park, MD	W 40–14		
November 12	2:00 p.m.	at No. 15 Boston University*		Fenway Park; Boston, MA	W 14–13	30,263	
November 24		West Virginia*	No. 15	Byrd Stadium; College Park, MD (rivalry)	W 47–7	16,117	
December 2		at Miami (FL)*	No. 14	Burdine Stadium; Miami, FL	W 13–0	34,886	
January 2		vs. No. 20 Missouri*	No. 14	Gator Bowl Stadium; Jacksonville, FL (Gator Bowl)	W 20–7	18,409–22,000	
*Non-conference game; ^{†}Homecoming; Rankings from AP Poll released prior to the game; All times are in Eastern time

== Rankings ==
Ranking movements Legend: ██ Increase in ranking ██ Decrease in ranking — = Not ranked
	Week								
Poll	1	2	3	4	5	6	7	8	Final
AP	—	—	—	—	—	—	16	15	14

== Coaching staff ==
- Jim Tatum, head coach
- Al Woods
- Jack Hennemier, line
- Max Reed, line
- Babe Wood, offensive asst.
- John Cudmore
- Warren Giese
- Bill Meek, freshmen
- Duke Wyre, trainer
- W.W. Cobey, graduate manager
