= Whedbee =

Whedbee is a surname. Notable people with the surname include:

- Bertha Whedbee (1876–1960), American suffragist and police officer
- Charles H. Whedbee (1911–1990), American lawyer and judge
- J. William Whedbee (1938–2004), American Biblical historian
- Mel Whedbee (1904–1974), American football coach
