= 1949 Arkansas Razorbacks football team =

American college football season

1949 Arkansas Razorbacks football
- Conference: Southwest Conference
- Record: 5–5 (2–4 SWC)
- Head coach: John Barnhill (4th season)
- Captain: Alvin Duke
- Home stadium: Razorback Stadium; War Memorial Stadium

1949 Southwest Conference football standings
	Conf.					Overall
Team	W		L		T	W		L		T
No. 5 Rice $	6	–	0	–	0	10	–	1	–	0
No. 20 Baylor	4	–	2	–	0	8	–	2	–	0
TCU	3	–	3	–	0	6	–	3	–	1
Texas	3	–	3	–	0	6	–	4	–	0
SMU	2	–	3	–	1	5	–	4	–	1
Arkansas	2	–	4	–	0	5	–	5	–	0
Texas A&M	0	–	5	–	1	1	–	8	–	1
$ – Conference champion; Rankings from AP Poll

The 1949 Arkansas Razorbacks football team represented the University of Arkansas in the Southwest Conference (SWC) during the 1949 college football season. In their fourth and final year under head coach John Barnhill, the Razorbacks compiled a 5–5 record (2–4 against SWC opponents), finished in sixth place in the SWC, and were outscored by their opponents by a combined total of 175 to 167.

The 1949 season included the first football game between Arkansas and current Southeastern Conference opponent Vanderbilt. Geno Mazzanti was the Razorbacks' leading rusher in 1949 with 757 rushing yards on 123 carries (6.2 yards per carry). Don Logue led the team in passing, completing 31 of 79 passes for 374 yards. Future NFL player and college football broadcaster Pat Summerall, a freshman, led the Razorbacks in receiving categories in 1949 with 17 catches for 298 yards. Summerall also played defensive line and placekicker.

== Schedule ==
Date	Opponent	Site	Result	Attendance	Source
September 24	North Texas State*	War Memorial Stadium; Little Rock, AR	W 33–19		
October 1	TCU	Razorback Stadium; Fayetteville, AR	W 27–7	16,000	
October 8	at Baylor	Municipal Stadium; Waco, TX	L 13–35	14,000	
October 15	No. 16 Texas	War Memorial Stadium; Little Rock, AR (rivalry)	L 14–27	30,000	
October 22	Vanderbilt*	Dudley Field; Nashville, TN	W 7–6	26,500	
October 29	Texas A&M^{†}	Razorback Stadium; Fayetteville, AR (rivalry)	W 27–6	20,000	
November 5	at No. 8 Rice	Rice Field; Houston, TX	L 0–14	26,000	
November 12	at No. 12 SMU	Cotton Bowl; Dallas, TX	L 6–34	63,000	
November 19	William & Mary*	War Memorial Stadium; Little Rock, AR	L 0–20	16,000	
November 26	Tulsa*	Razorback Stadium; Little Rock, AR	W 40–7	12,000	
*Non-conference game; ^{†}Homecoming; Rankings from AP Poll released prior to the game

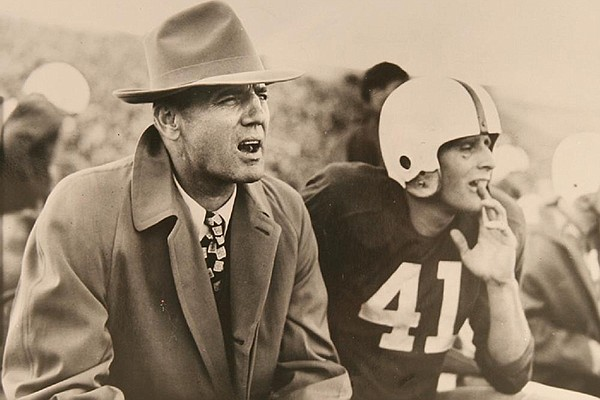
Coach Barnhill and Buddy Sutton watch from the sidelines
