= 1949 NC State Wolfpack football team =

American college football season

1949 NC State Wolfpack football
- Conference: Southern Conference
- Record: 3–7 (3–6 SoCon)
- Head coach: Beattie Feathers (6th season)
- Home stadium: Riddick Stadium

1949 Southern Conference football standings
	Conf.					Overall
Team	W		L		T	W		L		T
No. 16 North Carolina $	5	–	0	–	0	7	–	4	–	0
No. 14 Maryland	4	–	0	–	0	9	–	1	–	0
Washington and Lee	3	–	1	–	1	3	–	5	–	1
Duke	4	–	2	–	0	6	–	3	–	0
William & Mary	4	–	2	–	0	6	–	4	–	0
VMI	3	–	2	–	1	3	–	5	–	1
The Citadel	2	–	2	–	0	4	–	5	–	0
Clemson	2	–	2	–	0	4	–	4	–	2
Furman	3	–	3	–	0	3	–	6	–	0
South Carolina	3	–	3	–	0	4	–	6	–	0
Wake Forest	3	–	3	–	0	4	–	6	–	0
George Washington	2	–	3	–	0	4	–	5	–	0
NC State	3	–	6	–	0	3	–	7	–	0
VPI	1	–	5	–	2	1	–	7	–	2
Richmond	2	–	6	–	0	3	–	7	–	0
Davidson	1	–	5	–	0	2	–	8	–	0
$ – Conference champion; Rankings from AP Poll

The 1949 NC State Wolfpack football team represented North Carolina State University during the 1949 college football season. The Wolfpack were led by sixth-year head coach Beattie Feathers and played their home games at Riddick Stadium in Raleigh, North Carolina. They competed as members of the Southern Conference.

== Schedule ==
Date	Time	Opponent	Site	Result	Attendance	Source
September 24		at North Carolina	Kenan Memorial Stadium; Chapel Hill, NC (rivalry)	L 6–26	44,000	
October 1		Clemson	Riddick Stadium; Raleigh, NC (rivalry)	L 6–7	18,000	
October 8		at Davidson	American Legion Memorial Stadium; Charlotte, NC	L 14–20		
October 15		at Duke	Duke Stadium; Durham, NC (rivalry)	L 13–14	20,000	
October 22		Maryland	Riddick Stadium; Raleigh, NC	L 6–14	15,000	
October 29	2:30 p.m.	vs. VPI	Foreman Field; Norfolk, VA (Oyster Bowl)	W 14–13	21,000–23,500	
November 5		Richmond	Riddick Stadium; Raleigh, NC	W 20–6	8,000	
November 12		No. 18 Wake Forest	Riddick Stadium; Raleigh, NC (rivalry)	W 27–14	20,000	
November 19		at Villanova*	Franklin Field; Philadelphia, PA	L 21–45	23,000	
November 26		at William & Mary	Cary Field; Williamsburg, VA	L 7–33	8,000	
*Non-conference game; Rankings from AP Poll released prior to the game
