= 1949 Clemson Tigers football team =

American college football season

1949 Clemson Tigers football
- Conference: Southern Conference
- Record: 4–4–2 (2–2 SoCon)
- Head coach: Frank Howard (10th season)
- Captain: Gene Moore
- Home stadium: Memorial Stadium

1949 Southern Conference football standings
	Conf.					Overall
Team	W		L		T	W		L		T
No. 16 North Carolina $	5	–	0	–	0	7	–	4	–	0
No. 14 Maryland	4	–	0	–	0	9	–	1	–	0
Washington and Lee	3	–	1	–	1	3	–	5	–	1
Duke	4	–	2	–	0	6	–	3	–	0
William & Mary	4	–	2	–	0	6	–	4	–	0
VMI	3	–	2	–	1	3	–	5	–	1
The Citadel	2	–	2	–	0	4	–	5	–	0
Clemson	2	–	2	–	0	4	–	4	–	2
Furman	3	–	3	–	0	3	–	6	–	0
South Carolina	3	–	3	–	0	4	–	6	–	0
Wake Forest	3	–	3	–	0	4	–	6	–	0
George Washington	2	–	3	–	0	4	–	5	–	0
NC State	3	–	6	–	0	3	–	7	–	0
VPI	1	–	5	–	2	1	–	7	–	2
Richmond	2	–	6	–	0	3	–	7	–	0
Davidson	1	–	5	–	0	2	–	8	–	0
$ – Conference champion; Rankings from AP Poll

The 1949 Clemson Tigers football team was an American football team that represented Clemson College in the Southern Conference during the 1949 college football season. In its tenth season under head coach Frank Howard, the team compiled a 4–4–2 record (2–2 against conference opponents), tied for seventh place in the Southern Conference, and outscored opponents by a total of 232 to 216. The team played its home games at Memorial Stadium in Clemson, South Carolina.

The team's statistical leaders included wingback Ray Mathews with 487 passing yards and 728 rushing yards and fullback Fred Cone with 55 points scored (9 touchdowns an 1 extra point).

Center Gene Moore was the team captain. Fullback Fred Cone and wingback Ray Mathews were selected as first-team players on the 1949 All-Southern Conference football team. Cone, Mathews, and end John Poulos were named to the All-South Carolina football team for 1949.

== Schedule ==
Date	Time	Opponent	Site	Result	Attendance	Source
September 17	8:00 p.m.	Presbyterian*	Memorial Stadium; Clemson, SC	W 69–7		
September 24	8:15 p.m.	at Rice*	Rice Field; Houston, TX	L 7–33		
October 1	8:00 p.m.	at NC State	Riddick Stadium; Raleigh, NC (rivalry)	W 7–6	18,000	
October 8	8:00 p.m.	Mississippi State*	Memorial Stadium; Clemson, SC	T 7–7	18,000	
October 20	2:00 p.m.	at South Carolina	Carolina Stadium; Columbia, SC (rivalry)	L 13–27	35,000	
October 29	8:00 p.m.	Wake Forest	Memorial Stadium; Clemson, SC	L 21–35	19,000	
November 5	2:00 p.m.	Boston College*^{†}	Memorial Stadium; Clemson, SC (rivalry)	L 27–40	19,000	
November 12	8:00 p.m.	Duquesne*	Memorial Stadium; Clemson, SC	W 33–20		
November 19	2:00 p.m.	at Furman	Sirrine Stadium; Greenville, SC	W 28–21	18,000	
November 26	2:00 p.m.	vs. Auburn*	Ladd Stadium; Mobile, AL (rivalry)	T 20–20	14,000	
*Non-conference game; ^{†}Homecoming; All times are in Eastern time
