= 1949 Georgetown Hoyas football team =

American college football season

1949 Georgetown Hoyas football

Sun Bowl, L 20–33 vs. Texas Western
- Conference: Independent
- Record: 5–5
- Head coach: Bob Margarita (1st season)
- Captains: Fran Desmond; Tom Dolan
- Home stadium: Griffith Stadium

1949 Southern college football independents records
	Conf.			Overall
Team	W	L	T	W		L		T
Maryland State		–		8	–	0	–	0
Memphis State		–		9	–	1	–	0
Delaware		–		8	–	1	–	0
Virginia		–		7	–	2	–	0
Grambling		–		7	–	3	–	2
Miami (FL)		–		6	–	3	–	0
Sewanee		–		4	–	2	–	1
Chattanooga		–		5	–	4	–	0
Georgetown		–		5	–	5	–	0
West Virginia		–		4	–	6	–	1
Navy		–		3	–	5	–	1
Rollins		–		3	–	5	–	0
Texas State		–		3	–	6	–	1
Oklahoma City		–		2	–	8	–	0

The 1949 Georgetown Hoyas football team was an American football team that represented Georgetown University as an independent during the 1949 college football season. In their first season under head coach Bob Margarita, the Hoyas compiled a 5–4 record in the regular season, lost to Texas Western in the 1950 Sun Bowl, and were outscored by all opponents by a total of 210 to 139. The team played its home games at Griffith Stadium in Washington, D.C.

== Schedule ==
Date	Opponent	Site	Result	Attendance	Source
September 24	at Holy Cross	Fitton Field; Worcester, MA	W 20–13	16,000	
September 30	at Maryland	Byrd Stadium; College Park, MD	L 7–33	18,227	
October 8	at Wake Forest	Wake Forest, NC	W 12–6	5,500	
October 14	NYU	Griffith Stadium; Washington, DC	W 21–6	5,000	
October 21	at Boston College	Braves Field; Boston, MA	W 10–7	22,763	
October 29	at Fordham	Polo Grounds; New York, NY	L 0–42	25,000	
November 4	Villanova	Griffith Stadium; Washington, DC	L 14–29	11,071	
November 12	at Denver	DU Stadium; Denver, CO	W 28–13	15,000	
November 19	George Washington	Griffith Stadium; Washington, DC	L 7–28	12,546	
January 2, 1950	at Texas Western	Kidd Field; El Paso, TX (Sun Bowl)	L 22–30	15,000	
