= 1949 Virginia Cavaliers football team =

American college football season

1949 Virginia Cavaliers football
- Conference: Independent
- Record: 7–2
- Head coach: Art Guepe (4th season)
- Captain: John Thomas
- Home stadium: Scott Stadium

1949 Southern college football independents records
	Conf.			Overall
Team	W	L	T	W		L		T
Maryland State		–		8	–	0	–	0
Memphis State		–		9	–	1	–	0
Delaware		–		8	–	1	–	0
Virginia		–		7	–	2	–	0
Grambling		–		7	–	3	–	2
Miami (FL)		–		6	–	3	–	0
Sewanee		–		4	–	2	–	1
Chattanooga		–		5	–	4	–	0
Georgetown		–		5	–	5	–	0
West Virginia		–		4	–	6	–	1
Navy		–		3	–	5	–	1
Rollins		–		3	–	5	–	0
Texas State		–		3	–	6	–	1
Oklahoma City		–		2	–	8	–	0

The 1949 Virginia Cavaliers football team represented the University of Virginia during the 1949 college football season. The Cavaliers were led by fourth-year head coach Art Guepe and played their home games at Scott Stadium in Charlottesville, Virginia. They competed as independents. Opening the year with seven straight victories, Virginia climbed to ninth in the AP Poll. They lost their final two games of the year, including to rival North Carolina, to finish 7–2.

== Schedule ==
Date	Opponent	Rank	Site	Result	Attendance	Source
September 24	George Washington		Scott Stadium; Charlottesville, VA	W 27–13	18,000	
October 1	Miami (OH)		Scott Stadium; Charlottesville, VA	W 21–18	13,000	
October 8	vs. VPI		Victory Stadium; Roanoke, VA (rivalry)	W 26–0	15,000	
October 15	Washington and Lee^{†}		Scott Stadium; Charlottesville, VA	W 27–7	17,000	
October 22	vs. VMI		City Stadium; Lynchburg, VA	W 32–13	10,000	
October 29	West Virginia		Scott Stadium; Charlottesville, VA	W 19–14	16,000	
November 5	at No. 20 Penn	No. 19	Franklin Field; Philadelphia, PA	W 26–14	50,771	
November 19	No. 19 Tulane	No. 9	Scott Stadium; Charlottesville, VA	L 14–28	30,000	
November 26	at No. 19 North Carolina		Kenan Memorial Stadium; Chapel Hill, NC (South's Oldest Rivalry)	L 7–14	44,500	
^{†}Homecoming; Rankings from AP Poll released prior to the game

== Rankings ==
Ranking movements Legend: ██ Increase in ranking ██ Decrease in ranking — = Not ranked ( ) = First-place votes
	Week								
Poll	1	2	3	4	5	6	7	8	Final
AP	—	—	—	—	19	10	9 (1)	—	—
