= 1937 Southern Jaguars football team =

American college football season

1937 Southern Jaguars football
- Conference: Southwestern Athletic Conference
- Record: 4–4–1 (1–4–1 SWAC)
- Head coach: Ace Mumford (2nd season)
- Home stadium: University Stadium

1937 Southwestern Athletic Conference football standings
	Conf.					Overall
Team	W		L		T	W		L		T
Texas College $	5	–	0	–	1	8	–	0	–	1
Arkansas AM&N	3	–	0	–	3	7	–	0	–	3
Prairie View	4	–	2	–	0	7	–	4	–	0
Langston	3	–	3	–	0	3	–	4	–	1
Wiley	2	–	3	–	1	5	–	5	–	1
Southern	1	–	4	–	1	4	–	4	–	1
Bishop	0	–	6	–	0	1	–	6	–	1
$ – Conference champion

The 1937 Southern Jaguars football team was an American football team that represented Southern University as a member of the Southwestern Athletic Conference (SWAC) during the 1937 college football season. In their second season under head coach Ace Mumford, the Jaguars compiled an overall record of 4–4–1, with a mark of 1–4–1 in conference play, and finished sixth in the SWAC.

The team played its home games at University Stadium in Scotlandville, Louisiana (which has since been annexed into the Baton Rouge city limits).

== Schedule ==
Date	Opponent	Site	Result	Attendance	Source
October 2	Alcorn A&M*	University Stadium; Scotlandville, LA	W 25–0		
October 9	at Bishop	Marshall, TX	W 19–0		
October 16	Langston	University Stadium; Scotlandville, LA	L 6–7		
October 23	at Arkansas AM&N	Athletic Field; Pine Bluff, AR	T 13–13		
November 1	vs. Wiley	State Fair Stadium; Shreveport, LA	L 0–7	5,000	
November 6	at Dillard*	Athletic Field; New Orleans, LA	W 39–0		
November 13	Texas College	University Stadium; Scotlandville, LA	L 0–7		
November 20	at Samuel Huston*	Austin, TX	W 27–0		
November 25	Prairie View	University Stadium; Scotlandville, LA	L 7–13		
*Non-conference game
