= 1949 Wake Forest Demon Deacons football team =

American college football season

1949 Wake Forest Demon Deacons football
- Conference: Southern Conference
- Record: 4–6 (3–3 SoCon)
- Head coach: Peahead Walker (13th season)
- Captain: Ed Bradley
- Home stadium: Groves Stadium

1949 Southern Conference football standings
	Conf.					Overall
Team	W		L		T	W		L		T
No. 16 North Carolina $	5	–	0	–	0	7	–	4	–	0
No. 14 Maryland	4	–	0	–	0	9	–	1	–	0
Washington and Lee	3	–	1	–	1	3	–	5	–	1
Duke	4	–	2	–	0	6	–	3	–	0
William & Mary	4	–	2	–	0	6	–	4	–	0
VMI	3	–	2	–	1	3	–	5	–	1
The Citadel	2	–	2	–	0	4	–	5	–	0
Clemson	2	–	2	–	0	4	–	4	–	2
Furman	3	–	3	–	0	3	–	6	–	0
South Carolina	3	–	3	–	0	4	–	6	–	0
Wake Forest	3	–	3	–	0	4	–	6	–	0
George Washington	2	–	3	–	0	4	–	5	–	0
NC State	3	–	6	–	0	3	–	7	–	0
VPI	1	–	5	–	2	1	–	7	–	2
Richmond	2	–	6	–	0	3	–	7	–	0
Davidson	1	–	5	–	0	2	–	8	–	0
$ – Conference champion; Rankings from AP Poll

The 1949 Wake Forest Demon Deacons football team was an American football team that represented Wake Forest University during the 1949 college football season. In its 13th season under head coach Peahead Walker, the team compiled a 4–6 record and finished in a three-way tie for ninth place in the Southern Conference.

Back Bill Gregus and guard Ray Cicia were selected by the Associated Press as first-team players on the 1949 All-Southern Conference football team.

== Schedule ==
Date	Opponent	Rank	Site	Result	Attendance	Source
September 17	Duquesne*		Groves Stadium; Wake Forest, NC	W 22–7	12,000	
September 24	at SMU*		Cotton Bowl; Dallas, TX	L 7–13	51,000	
September 30	at Boston College*		Braves Field; Boston, MA	L 7–13	19,156	
October 8	Georgetown*		Groves Stadium; Wake Forest, NC	L 6–12	5,500	
October 15	at No. 6 North Carolina		Kenan Memorial Stadium; Chapel Hill, NC (rivalry)	L 14–28	44,000	
October 22	William & Mary		Groves Stadium; Wake Forest, NC	W 55–28	12,000	
October 29	at Clemson		Memorial Stadium; Clemson, SC	W 35–21	19,000	
November 5	at No. 16 Duke		Duke Stadium; Durham, NC (rivalry)	W 27–7	35,000	
November 12	at NC State	No. 18	Riddick Stadium; Raleigh, NC (rivalry)	L 14–27	20,000	
November 26	at South Carolina		Carolina Stadium; Columbia, SC	L 20–27	20,000	
*Non-conference game; Rankings from AP Poll released prior to the game

== Rankings ==
Ranking movements Legend: ██ Increase in ranking ██ Decrease in ranking — = Not ranked
	Week								
Poll	1	2	3	4	5	6	7	8	Final
AP	—	—	—	—	—	18	—	—	—

== Team leaders ==
Category	Team Leader	Att/Cth	Yds
Passing	Carroll Blackerby	65/131	837
Rushing	Nub Smith	108	572
Receiving	Red O'Quinn	34	490
