= 1949 Navy Midshipmen football team =

American college football season

1949 Navy Midshipmen football
- Conference: Independent
- Record: 3–5–1
- Head coach: George Sauer (2nd season)
- Captain: Phil Ryan
- Home stadium: Thompson Stadium

1949 Southern college football independents records
	Conf.			Overall
Team	W	L	T	W		L		T
Maryland State		–		8	–	0	–	0
Memphis State		–		9	–	1	–	0
Delaware		–		8	–	1	–	0
Virginia		–		7	–	2	–	0
Grambling		–		7	–	3	–	2
Miami (FL)		–		6	–	3	–	0
Sewanee		–		4	–	2	–	1
Chattanooga		–		5	–	4	–	0
Georgetown		–		5	–	5	–	0
West Virginia		–		4	–	6	–	1
Navy		–		3	–	5	–	1
Rollins		–		3	–	5	–	0
Texas State		–		3	–	6	–	1
Oklahoma City		–		2	–	8	–	0

The 1949 Navy Midshipmen football team represented the United States Naval Academy during the 1949 college football season. In their second season under head coach George Sauer, the Midshipmen compiled a 3–5–1 record and were outscored by their opponents by a combined score of 238 to 151.

== Schedule ==
Date	Opponent	Rank	Site	Result	Attendance	Source
September 24	at USC		Los Angeles Memorial Coliseum; Los Angeles, CA	L 20–42	62,787	
October 1	vs. Princeton		Municipal Stadium; Baltimore, MD	W 28–7	36,736	
October 8	No. 14 Duke		Thompson Stadium; Annapolis, MD	W 28–14	22,000	
October 15	at Wisconsin	No. 18	Camp Randall Stadium; Madison, WI	L 13–48	45,000	
October 22	at No. 14 Penn		Franklin Field; Philadelphia, PA	L 7–28	66,125	
October 29	No. 1 Notre Dame		Municipal Stadium; Baltimore, MD (rivalry)	L 0–40	62,000	
November 5	at Tulane*		Tulane Stadium; New Orleans, LA	T 21–21	70,000	
November 12	Columbia		Thompson Stadium; Annapolis, MD	W 34–0	18,000	
November 26	vs. No. 4 Army		Philadelphia Municipal Stadium; Philadelphia, PA (Army–Navy Game)	L 0–38		
*Non-conference game; Rankings from AP Poll released prior to the game

== Rankings ==
Ranking movements Legend: ██ Increase in ranking ██ Decrease in ranking — = Not ranked
	Week								
Poll	1	2	3	4	5	6	7	8	Final
AP	—	18	—	—	—	—	—	—	—
