= 1949 The Citadel Bulldogs football team =

American college football season

1949 The Citadel Bulldogs football
- Conference: Southern Conference
- Record: 4–5 (2–2 SoCon)
- Head coach: J. Quinn Decker (4th season)
- Home stadium: Johnson Hagood Stadium

1949 Southern Conference football standings
	Conf.					Overall
Team	W		L		T	W		L		T
No. 16 North Carolina $	5	–	0	–	0	7	–	4	–	0
No. 14 Maryland	4	–	0	–	0	9	–	1	–	0
Washington and Lee	3	–	1	–	1	3	–	5	–	1
Duke	4	–	2	–	0	6	–	3	–	0
William & Mary	4	–	2	–	0	6	–	4	–	0
VMI	3	–	2	–	1	3	–	5	–	1
The Citadel	2	–	2	–	0	4	–	5	–	0
Clemson	2	–	2	–	0	4	–	4	–	2
Furman	3	–	3	–	0	3	–	6	–	0
South Carolina	3	–	3	–	0	4	–	6	–	0
Wake Forest	3	–	3	–	0	4	–	6	–	0
George Washington	2	–	3	–	0	4	–	5	–	0
NC State	3	–	6	–	0	3	–	7	–	0
VPI	1	–	5	–	2	1	–	7	–	2
Richmond	2	–	6	–	0	3	–	7	–	0
Davidson	1	–	5	–	0	2	–	8	–	0
$ – Conference champion; Rankings from AP Poll

The 1949 The Citadel Bulldogs football team represented The Citadel, The Military College of South Carolina in the 1949 college football season. J. Quinn Decker served as head coach for the fourth season. The Bulldogs played as members of the Southern Conference and played home games at Johnson Hagood Stadium.

== Schedule ==
Date	Opponent	Site	Result	Attendance	Source
September 24	at Florida*	Florida Field; Gainesville, FL	L 0–13	20,000	
October 7	Newberry*	Johnson Hagood Stadium; Charleston, SC	W 14–12		
October 15	at No. 8 Kentucky*	McLean Stadium; Lexington, KY	L 0–44		
October 21	Furman	Johnson Hagood Stadium; Charleston, SC (rivalry)	L 7–19		
October 28	vs. Wofford*	County Fairgrounds; Orangeburg, SC (rivalry)	L 7–21	10,000	
November 4	Presbyterian*	Johnson Hagood Stadium; Charleston, SC	W 27–7		
November 12	VMI	Johnson Hagood Stadium; Charleston, SC (rivalry)	W 19–14	8,000	
November 24	at Davidson	American Legion Memorial Stadium; Charlotte, NC	W 25–19	6,000	
December 3	at South Carolina	Carolina Stadium; Columbia, SC	L 0–42		
*Non-conference game; Rankings from AP Poll released prior to the game
