= 1949 Memphis State Tigers football team =

American college football season

1949 Memphis State Tigers football
- Conference: Independent
- Record: 9–1
- Head coach: Ralph Hatley (3rd season)
- Home stadium: Crump Stadium

1949 Southern college football independents records
	Conf.			Overall
Team	W	L	T	W		L		T
Maryland State		–		8	–	0	–	0
Memphis State		–		9	–	1	–	0
Delaware		–		8	–	1	–	0
Virginia		–		7	–	2	–	0
Grambling		–		7	–	3	–	2
Miami (FL)		–		6	–	3	–	0
Sewanee		–		4	–	2	–	1
Chattanooga		–		5	–	4	–	0
Georgetown		–		5	–	5	–	0
West Virginia		–		4	–	6	–	1
Navy		–		3	–	5	–	1
Rollins		–		3	–	5	–	0
Texas State		–		3	–	6	–	1
Oklahoma City		–		2	–	8	–	0

The 1949 Memphis State Tigers football team was an American football team that represented Memphis State College (now known as the University of Memphis) as an independent during the 1949 college football season. In their third season under head coach Ralph Hatley, Memphis State compiled a 9–1 record.

== Schedule ==
Date	Time	Opponent	Site	Result	Attendance	Source
September 16		Ole Miss	Crump Stadium; Memphis, TN (rivalry)	L 7–40	12,578	
September 23	7:00 p.m.	at Tampa	Phillips Field; Tampa, FL	W 70–6	6,000	
October 1	2:00 p.m.	at Washington University	Francis Field; St. Louis, MO	W 34–0	6,500	
October 8		Delta State	Crump Stadium; Memphis, TN	W 47–0		
October 15		Pensacola NAS	Crump Stadium; Memphis, TN	W 49–0		
October 22		Kansas State	Crump Stadium; Memphis, TN	W 21–14		
October 29		at Murray State	Murray, KY	W 34–6		
November 5		Louisiana College	Crump Stadium; Memphis, TN	W 27–0		
November 12		at Arkansas State	Kays Stadium; Jonesboro, AR (rivalry)	W 61–7		
November 18		at Union (TN)	Rothrock Field; Jackson, TN	W 35–0		
All times are in Central time
