= 1950 Cotton Bowl Classic =

- 14th Cotton Bowl Classic
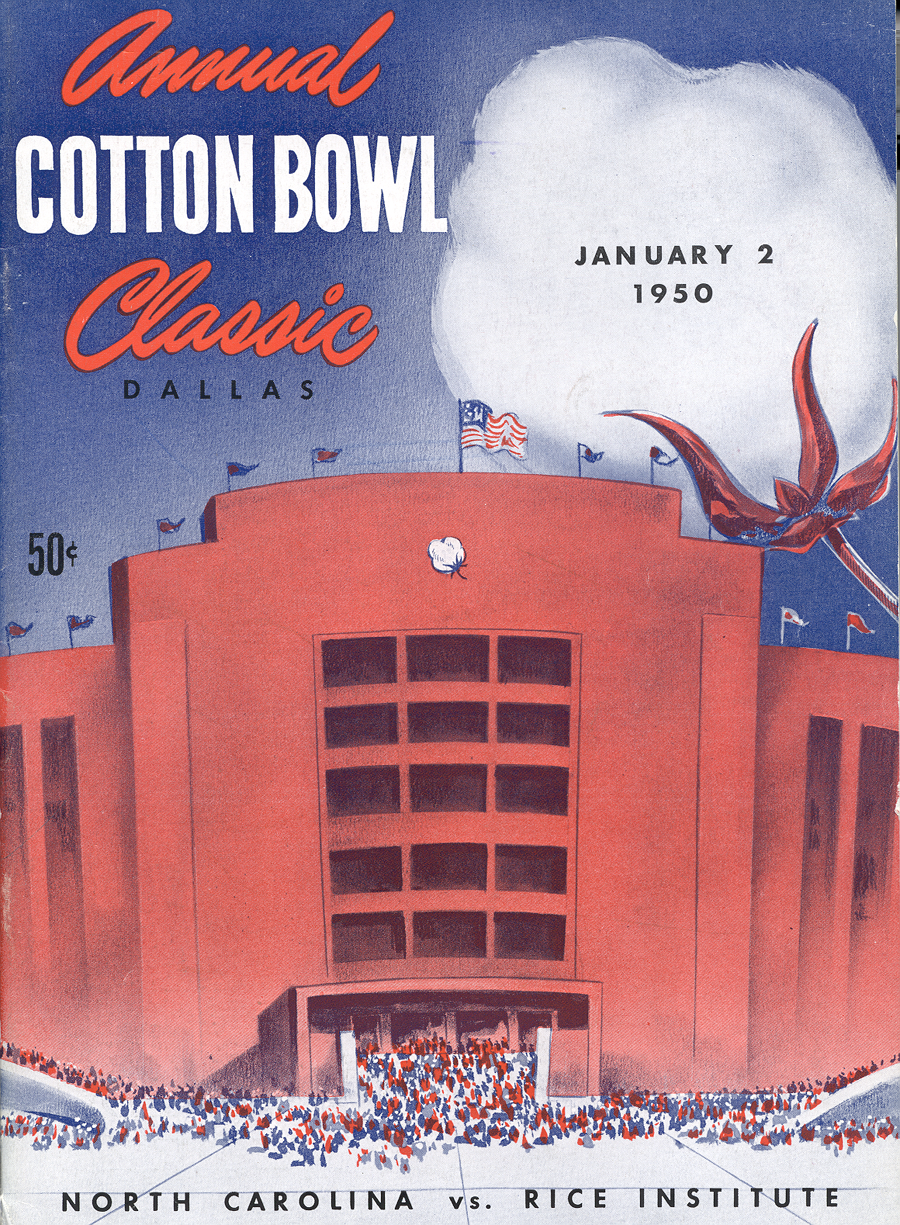
North Carolina Tar Heels	Rice Owls
(7–3)	(9–1)
SoCon	SWC
13	27
Head coach: Carl Snavely	Head coach: Jess Neely
AP 16	AP 5
	1	2	3	4	Total
North Carolina	0	0	0	13	13
Rice	0	14	7	6	27
- Date: January 2, 1950
- Season: 1949
- Stadium: Cotton Bowl
- Location: Dallas, Texas
- MVP: HB Billy Burkhalter (Rice); C Joe Watson (Rice); End James Williams (Rice)
- Referee: Ray McCulloch (SWC; split crew: SWC, Southern)
- Attendance: 75,000

The Cotton Bowl in Dallas, Texas, hosted the Cotton Bowl Classic.

The 1950 Cotton Bowl Classic featured the Rice Owls and the North Carolina Tar Heels.

== Background ==
The Owls won the Southwest Conference for the fourth time in 15 years. This was their second appearance in the Cotton Bowl Classic and their first since 1938. The Tar Heels were playing in their first ever Cotton Bowl Classic and their third bowl game in Coach Snavely's fifth season with the team. They were champions of the Southern Conference for the 2nd time in three years. They were looking for their first ever bowl win.

== Game summary ==
The Owls would score 27 straight points before the Tar Heels got on the board, and the Heels never recovered, despite scoring two touchdowns late. The Owls scored early in the second quarter on a Billy Burkhalter touchdown catch from Tobin Rote and Bobby Lantrip scored before the half ended to make it 14–0. James "Froggy" Williams scored in the third quarter on a catch from Rote to make it 21–0, and Burkhalter ended Rice's scoring with his touchdown run to make it 27–0. Not deterred, Paul Rizzo caught a touchdown pass from Charlie Justice to make it 27–7. But the Heels only scored again on a Rizzo run with only 47 seconds left, as the Owls won their second ever Cotton Bowl Classic.

== Aftermath ==
Snavely would not appear in another bowl game, and he left in 1953. Ten years later, the Tar Heels returned to a bowl game, which they won. The Owls would play in two more Cotton Bowl Classics after winning two more SWC titles before the decade ended, splitting the two.

== Statistics ==
Statistics	Rice	North Carolina
First downs	18	16
Yards rushing	226	174
Yards passing	152	80
Total yards	378	254
Punts-Average	6-38.0	4-42.8
Fumbles-Lost	2-1	3–1
Interceptions	1	1
Penalties-Yards	3-26	4-30
