= 1949 VPI Gobblers football team =

American college football season

1949 VPI Gobblers football
- Conference: Southern Conference
- Record: 1–7–2 (1–5–2 SoCon)
- Head coach: Bob McNeish (2nd season)
- Home stadium: Miles Stadium

1949 Southern Conference football standings
	Conf.					Overall
Team	W		L		T	W		L		T
No. 16 North Carolina $	5	–	0	–	0	7	–	4	–	0
No. 14 Maryland	4	–	0	–	0	9	–	1	–	0
Washington and Lee	3	–	1	–	1	3	–	5	–	1
Duke	4	–	2	–	0	6	–	3	–	0
William & Mary	4	–	2	–	0	6	–	4	–	0
VMI	3	–	2	–	1	3	–	5	–	1
The Citadel	2	–	2	–	0	4	–	5	–	0
Clemson	2	–	2	–	0	4	–	4	–	2
Furman	3	–	3	–	0	3	–	6	–	0
South Carolina	3	–	3	–	0	4	–	6	–	0
Wake Forest	3	–	3	–	0	4	–	6	–	0
George Washington	2	–	3	–	0	4	–	5	–	0
NC State	3	–	6	–	0	3	–	7	–	0
VPI	1	–	5	–	2	1	–	7	–	2
Richmond	2	–	6	–	0	3	–	7	–	0
Davidson	1	–	5	–	0	2	–	8	–	0
$ – Conference champion; Rankings from AP Poll

The 1949 VPI Gobblers football team represented Virginia Polytechnic Institute in the 1949 college football season. The team was led by their head coach Bob McNeish and finished with a record of one win, seven losses and two ties (1–7–2).

== Schedule ==
Date	Time	Opponent	Site	Result	Attendance	Source
September 17		vs. Quantico Marines*	George Washington High School; Alexandria, VA	L 14–33	12,000	
September 24		Maryland	Miles Stadium; Blacksburg, VA	L 7–34	10,000–12,000	
October 1		at William & Mary	Cary Field; Blacksburg, VA	L 13–39	10,000	
October 8		vs. Virginia*	Victory Stadium; Roanoke, VA (rivalry)	L 0–26	15,000	
October 15		George Washington^{†}	Miles Stadium; Blacksburg, VA	L 14–24	12,000	
October 22	2:00 p.m.	at Duke	Duke Stadium; Durham, NC	L 7–55	10,000	
October 29	2:30 p.m.	vs. NC State	Foreman Field; Norfolk, VA (Oyster Bowl)	L 13–14	21,000–23,500	
November 5		vs. Washington and Lee	Municipal Stadium; Lynchburg, VA	T 6–6	7,000	
November 12	2:30 p.m.	at Richmond	City Stadium; Richmond, VA	W 28–13	7,000	
November 24		vs. VMI	Victory Stadium; Roanoke, VA (rivalry)	T 28–28	25,500	
*Non-conference game; ^{†}Homecoming; All times are in Eastern time

== NFL Draft selections ==
= Pro Football Hall of Fame	= Canadian Football Hall of Fame	= College Football Hall of Fame

Year	Round	Pick	Overall	Name	Team	Position
1951	28	10	337	Sterling Wingo	Los Angeles Rams	Back

== Roster ==
The following players were members of the 1949 football team according to the roster published in the 1950 edition of The Bugle, the Virginia Tech yearbook.

VPI 1949 roster
Victor Anderson; Baucom; Ralph Coe Beard; Bill Bennett; Dean Gerrard Boyle; Robert Dean Carroll; Ronald Herman Casto; Coy Lenard Chambers; Joseph Litton Church; Pete "Chip" Collum; George Marriott Davis, Jr.; Hubert Wallace Dutton; Bruce Mills "Bud" Fisher; Thomas Malcolm Fisher; James Forrest; Eustace Frederick; Donald Funk; Hubert John Gerkin; Richard "Bob" Gilley; Richard D. Goodman	Lawrence Shultz Hansrote; Frank Hargrove; William Hughes Hegamyer; Bobby Hess; Andre Hodgson; Oren Edward Hopkins; Tom Howard; Richard Earle Huff; Jack Ross Ittner; Charles Edward Kernan; Jimmy Kitts; Richard Kuhn; Timothy Lawler; Bill Loomis; Casimir Jerome "Ki" Luczak; Kerry Jennings McBroom; Hamilton Otey Meriwether; Ronald Garland Miller; Roger Rowland Neel; Douglas Cooper Petty	W. H. Powell; Jay B. Ratliff; Charles Ronald Raugh; Roy Carrington Robinette; Pete Smith; Warren William Squires; John Robert Stortz; C. William Stultz; Taylor; Franklin Ray Taylor; David Lacy Thomas; Charles Thrush; Robert James Wachter; Robert Franklin Webb; Donald Lindbergh Whiteman; Ralph Wiesting; Sterling Lagrand Wingo; Dewey Benton Woolwine; Forrest Bayard "Frank" Yarborough
