= Red Smith (coach) =

American sports coach (1906–1959)

Biographical details
- Born: August 31, 1906; Mountville, South Carolina, U.S.
- Died: May 8, 1959 (aged 52)

Playing career

Football
- 1924: Furman
- Position: Tackle

Coaching career (HC unless noted)

Football
- 1926: Simpsonville HS (SC)
- 1927–1928: Gaffney HS (SC)
- 1929–1934: Hampden–Sydney (line)
- 1935–1936: The Citadel (line)
- 1937–1938: Hampden–Sydney (line)
- 1939–1941: Hampden–Sydney
- 1942: North Carolina Pre-Flight (line)
- 1948–1949: Furman

Baseball
- 1936: The Citadel

Track
- 1929–1935: Hampden–Sydney

Administrative career (AD unless noted)
- 1949: Furman

Head coaching record
- Overall: 15–28–1 (college football)

Herman Edward "Red" Smith (August 31, 1906 – May 8, 1959) was an American football, baseball, and track coach. He served as the head football coach at Hampden–Sydney College in Hampden Sydney, Virginia from 1939 to 1941 and Furman University in Greenville, South Carolina from 1948 to 1949, compiling a career college football coaching record of 15–28–1. Smith was also the head baseball coach at The Citadel in 1936.

Born in Mountville, South Carolina, Smith played football at Furman and was selected as All-Southern Intercollegiate Athletic Association (SIAA) as a tackle. He began his coaching career at Simpsonville High School in Simpsonville, South Carolina before moving to Gaffney High School in Gaffney, South Carolina. Smith earned a Master of Arts degree from the University of Michigan.

== Head coaching record ==
=== College football ===
Year	Team	Overall	Conference	Standing	Bowl/playoffs
Hampden–Sydney Tigers (Independent) (1939–1941)
1939	Hampden–Sydney	4–5			
1940	Hampden–Sydney	4–5			
1941	Hampden–Sydney	2–6			
Hampden–Sydney:		10–16			
Furman Purple Hurricane (Southern Conference) (1948–1949)
1948	Furman	2–6–1	2–4	T–10th	
1949	Furman	3–6	3–3	T–7th	
Furman:		5–12–1	5–7		
Total:		15–28–1			
