= Eolus Von Rettig =

American football coach

Biographical details
- Born: July 6, 1908
- Died: April 29, 1983 (aged 74); Dallas, Texas, U.S.

Playing career

Football
- c. 1928: Bishop
- 1931–1933: Wilberforce
- Position: Guard

Coaching career (HC unless noted)

Football
- 1934–1935: Texas College (line)
- 1936–1941: Texas College
- 1946–1948: Houston College / Texas State
- 1949–1951: Wiley
- 1952–1965: Prairie View A&M (assistant)

Baseball
- 1957–1960: Prairie View A&M

Head coaching record
- Overall: 46–48–14 (football); 30–27–1 (baseball)
- Bowls: 1–0

Accomplishments and honors

Championships
- Football; 2 SWAC (1936–1937)

Eolus Von Rettig (July 6, 1908 – April 29, 1983) was an American college football and college baseball coach. He served as the head football coach at Texas College in Tyler, Texas from 1936 to 1941, Texas State University for Negroes—now known as Texas Southern University—in Houston from 1946 to 1948, and Wiley College in Marshall, Texas from 1949 to 1951. He later served as an assistant coach at Prairie View A&M University.

== Career ==
Rettig played football at Wilberforce University in Wilberforce, Ohio as a guard. He served as line coach at Texas College from 1934 to 1935 under Ace Mumford before succeeding Mumford as head football coach in 1936. Rettig also played football at Bishop College in Marshall, Texas in the late 1920s when Mumford was head coach there.

== Death ==
Rettig died on April 29, 1983, at St. Paul's Hospital in Dallas.

== Head coaching record ==
=== Football ===
| Year | Team | Overall | Conference | Standing | Bowl/playoffs |
|---|---|---|---|---|---|
Texas College Steers (Southwestern Athletic Conference) (1936–1941)
| 1936 | Texas College | 5–2–2 | 4–1–1 | T–1st | |
| 1937 | Texas College | 8–0–1 | 5–0–1 | 1st | |
| 1938 | Texas College | 5–3–1 | 2–3–1 | T–4th | |
| 1939 | Texas College | 1–6–1 | 1–5 | 7th | |
| 1940 | Texas College | 4–2–1 | 3–2–1 | 4th | |
| 1941 | Texas College | 4–2–1 | 3–2–1 | 4th | |
| Texas College: | | 27–15–7 | 18–13–5 | | |
Houston College / Texas State Tigers (Independent) (1946–1948)
| 1946 | Houston College | 4–2–3 | | | |
| 1947 | Texas State | 9–3 | | | W Prairie View |
| 1948 | Texas State | 0–8–1 | | | |
| Houston College / Texas State: | | 13–13–4 | | | |
Wiley Wildcats (Southwestern Athletic Conference) (1949–1951)
| 1949 | Wiley | 0–9–1 | 0–6–1 | 8th | |
| 1950 | Wiley | 3–6–1 | 2–5 | T–5th | |
| 1951 | Wiley | 3–5–1 | 2–4–1 | 6th | |
| Wiley: | | 6–20–3 | 4–15–2 | | |
| Total: | | 46–48–14 | | | |
National championship Conference title Conference division title or championship game berth
