= 1925 Clark Panthers football team =

American college football season

1925 Clark Panthers football
- Conference: Southern Intercollegiate Athletic Conference
- Record: 4–2–1 (3–1 SIAC)
- Head coach: Sam B. Taylor (1st season)

The 1925 Clark Panthers football team represented Clark University—now known as Clark Atlanta University—as a member of the Southern Intercollegiate Athletic Conference (SIAC) during the 1925 college football season. Led by first-year head coach Sam B. Taylor, the Panthers compiled an overall record of 4–2–1 with a mark of 3–1 in conference play.

== Schedule ==
| Date | Time | Opponent | Site | Result | Attendance | Source |
|---|---|---|---|---|---|---|
| | | Paine* | | T 0–0 | | |
| October 16 | 3:00 p.m. | at Knoxville | Knoxville College grounds; Knoxville, TN | W 13–6 | | |
| October 23 | | Morris Brown | Atlanta, GA | W 13–0 | | |
| | | Florida A&M | | W 17–0 | | |
| November 11 | | at 24th Infantry, Fort Benning* | Doughboy Stadium; Fort Benning, Georgia | L 13–21 | 4,000 | |
| November 21 | 2:30 p.m. | Atlanta^{†} | Morehouse College campus or Spiller Field; Atlanta, GA | L 7–21 | | |
| November 26 | | Edward Waters* | | W 39–0 | | |
*Non-conference game; ^{†}Homecoming; All times are in Eastern time
