= 1949 SMU Mustangs football team =

American college football season

1949 SMU Mustangs football
- Conference: Southwest Conference
- Record: 5–4–1 (2–3–1 SWC)
- Head coach: Matty Bell (12th season)
- Captains: Dick McKissack; Bobby Folsom; Doak Walker
- Home stadium: Cotton Bowl

1949 Southwest Conference football standings
	Conf.					Overall
Team	W		L		T	W		L		T
No. 5 Rice $	6	–	0	–	0	10	–	1	–	0
No. 20 Baylor	4	–	2	–	0	8	–	2	–	0
TCU	3	–	3	–	0	6	–	3	–	1
Texas	3	–	3	–	0	6	–	4	–	0
SMU	2	–	3	–	1	5	–	4	–	1
Arkansas	2	–	4	–	0	5	–	5	–	0
Texas A&M	0	–	5	–	1	1	–	8	–	1
$ – Conference champion; Rankings from AP Poll

The 1949 SMU Mustangs football team was an American football team that represented Southern Methodist University (SMU) as a member of the Southwest Conference (SWC) during the 1949 college football season. In their 12th and final season under head coach Matty Bell, the Mustangs compiled a 5–4–1 record (2–3–1 against conference opponents) and outscored opponents by a total of 215 to 204. The team opened the season, 5–1–1, and reached No. 10 in the AP Poll, but lost the final three games of the season and ended up unranked. The team played its home games at the Cotton Bowl in Dallas.

Backs Doak Walker and Kyle Rote were selected by both the Associated Press (AP) and United Press (UP) on the 1949 All-Southwest Conference football team.

== Schedule ==
Date	Opponent	Rank	Site	Result	Attendance	Source
September 24	Wake Forest*		Cotton Bowl; Dallas, TX	W 13–7	51,000	
October 1	Missouri*^{†}		Cotton Bowl; Dallas, TX	W 28–27	58,000	
October 15	Rice	No. 10	Cotton Bowl; Dallas, TX (rivalry)	L 27–41	72,000	
October 22	No. 7 Kentucky*	No. 17	Cotton Bowl; Dallas, TX	W 20–7	48,000	
October 29	No. 19 Texas	No. 11	Cotton Bowl; Dallas, TX	W 7–6	75,000	
November 5	at Texas A&M	No. 9	Kyle Field; College Station, TX	T 27–27	31,000	
November 12	Arkansas	No. 12	Cotton Bowl; Dallas, TX	W 34–6	42,000	
November 19	No. 15 Baylor	No. 10	Cotton Bowl; Dallas, TX	L 26–35	63,000	
November 26	at TCU		Amon G. Carter Stadium; Fort Worth, TX (rivalry)	L 13–21	33,000	
December 3	No. 1 Notre Dame*		Cotton Bowl; Dallas, TX	L 20–27	75,457	
*Non-conference game; ^{†}Homecoming; Rankings from AP Poll released prior to the game

== Rankings ==
Ranking movements Legend: ██ Increase in ranking ██ Decrease in ranking — = Not ranked ( ) = First-place votes
	Week								
Poll	1	2	3	4	5	6	7	8	Final
AP	9	10 (1)	17	11	9	12	10	—	—
