= 1937 Prairie View Panthers football team =

American college football season

1937 Prairie View Panthers football

Prairie View Bowl, W 27–14 vs. Florida A&M
- Conference: Southwestern Athletic Conference
- Record: 7–4 (4–2 SWAC)
- Head coach: Sam B. Taylor (8th season)
- Home stadium: Blackshear Field

1937 Southwestern Athletic Conference football standings
	Conf.					Overall
Team	W		L		T	W		L		T
Texas College $	5	–	0	–	1	8	–	0	–	1
Arkansas AM&N	3	–	0	–	3	7	–	0	–	3
Prairie View	4	–	2	–	0	7	–	4	–	0
Langston	3	–	3	–	0	3	–	4	–	1
Wiley	2	–	3	–	1	5	–	5	–	1
Southern	1	–	4	–	1	4	–	4	–	1
Bishop	0	–	6	–	0	1	–	6	–	1
$ – Conference champion

The 1937 Prairie View Panthers football team was an American football team that represented Prairie View State Normal & Industrial College (now known as Prairie View A&M University) as a member of the Southwestern Athletic Conference (SWAC) during the 1937 college football season. In their eighth season under head coach Sam B. Taylor, the Panthers compiled an overall record of 7–4, with a mark of 4–2 in conference play, and finished third in the SWAC.

== Schedule ==
Date	Time	Opponent	Site	Result	Attendance	Source
September 25		Samuel Huston*	Blackshear Field; Prairie View, TX	W 46–0		
October 2		at Texas College	Fair Park; Tyler, TX	L 0–6		
October 9		Arkansas AM&N	Blackshear Field; Prairie View, TX	L 0–7	1,500	
October 18		vs. Wiley	Cotton Bowl; Dallas, TX	W 13–0	10,000	
October 23		at Tillotson*	Rosewood Park; Austin, TX	W 32–0		
November 6		at Xavier (LA)*	Xavier Stadium; New Orleans, LA	L 0–28	3,000	
November 11		Bishop^{†}	Blackshear Field; Prairie View, TX	W 7–0		
November 20		Langston	Blackshear Field; Prairie View, TX	W 14–9		
November 25		at Southern	University Stadium; Scotlandville, LA	W 13–7		
December 18		at Tuskegee*	Alumni Bowl; Tuskegee, AL	L 0–6		
January 1	2:30 p.m.	vs. Florida A&M*	Buffalo Stadium; Houston, TX (Prairie View Bowl)	W 27–14	4,500	
*Non-conference game; ^{†}Homecoming; All times are in Central time
