= 1950 Sun Bowl =

American college football game

Georgetown Hoyas	Texas Western Miners
(5–4)	(7–2–1)
Independent	Border Conference
20	33
Head coach: Bob Margarita	Head coach: Jack Curtice
	1	2	3	4	Total
Georgetown	0	0	7	13	20
Texas Western	0	13	7	13	33
- Date: January 2, 1950
- Season: 1949
- Stadium: Kidd Field
- Location: El Paso, Texas
- MVP: Harvey Gabrel, HB

The 1950 Sun Bowl was a college football postseason bowl game between the Texas Western Miners and the Georgetown Hoyas.

== Background ==
The Miners finished 3rd in the Border Conference in Curtice's final year with the team, as they tried to get their first Sun Bowl victory. This was Georgetown's second and final bowl game.

== Game summary ==
2nd quarter

- Chesak 1-yard run (kick failed) - UTEP 6-0
- Gabrel 1-yard run (Haesler kick) - UTEP 13-0

3rd quarter

- Fraser 32-yard run (Davis kick) UTEP 13-7
- Kivas 3-yard run (Haesler kick) UTEP 20-7

4th quarter

- Gabrel 19-yard run (kick blocked) - UTEP 26-7
- Schmidt 14-yard pass from Deacon (kick failed) - UTEP 26-13
- Hansen 51-yard kickoff return (Davis kick) - UTEP 33-13
- Fornaciari 54-yard pass from Deacon (Haesler kick) - UTEP 33-20

== Aftermath ==
The Miners made four Sun Bowls in the decade, along with two more in the next decade. Curtice left for Utah after the game.

== Statistics ==
Statistics	Texas Western	Georgetown
First downs	14	13
Yards rushing	348	82
Yards passing	24	226
Total yards	372	308
Punts-Average	5-36.0	10-33.0
Fumbles-Lost	2-2	2-1
Interceptions	0	3
Penalties-Yards	11-95	7-65
