= 1949 Maryland State Raiders football team =

American college football season

1949 Maryland State Raiders football
- Conference: Independent
- Record: 8–0
- Head coach: Vernon McCain (2nd season)

1949 Southern college football independents records
	Conf.			Overall
Team	W	L	T	W		L		T
Maryland State		–		8	–	0	–	0
Memphis State		–		9	–	1	–	0
Delaware		–		8	–	1	–	0
Virginia		–		7	–	2	–	0
Grambling		–		7	–	3	–	2
Miami (FL)		–		6	–	3	–	0
Sewanee		–		4	–	2	–	1
Chattanooga		–		5	–	4	–	0
Georgetown		–		5	–	5	–	0
West Virginia		–		4	–	6	–	1
Navy		–		3	–	5	–	1
Rollins		–		3	–	5	–	0
Texas State		–		3	–	6	–	1
Oklahoma City		–		2	–	8	–	0

The 1949 Maryland State Raiders football team was an American football team that represented Maryland State College (now known as University of Maryland Eastern Shore) during the 1949 college football season. In their second season under head coach Vernon McCain, the team compiled an 8–0 record, shut out seven of eight opponents, outscored all opponents by a total of 310 to 8, and was ranked No. 6 among the nation's black college football teams according to the Pittsburgh Courier and its Dickinson Rating System.

The November 15 game against Trenton State Teachers College (now known as The College of New Jersey) was the first interracial game played on the Eastern Shore of Maryland. Maryland State played a second interracial game the following week against Glassboro State Teachers College.

Maryland State halfback Sylvester Polk who led the nation with 129 points scored. Other key players included T-slotter Calvin Martin and guard Donald Thomas.

== Schedule ==
Date	Opponent	Site	Result	Attendance	Source
October 1	at Grambling	Grambling, LA	W 14–8	6,581	
October 7	at South Carolina State	Orangeburg, SC	W 39–0		
October 15	Trenton State	Princess Anne, MD	W 46–0		
October 22	Glassboro State	Princess Anne, MD	W 19–0		
October 29	Cheyney	Cheyney, PA	W 46–0		
November 12	Virginia Union^{†}	Princess Anne, MD	W 46–0	3,500	
November 19	Bethune–Cookman	Princess Anne, MD	W 41–0		
November 24	Fayetteville State	Princess Anne, MD	W 60–0		
^{†}Homecoming
