= 1949 Wiley Wildcats football team =

American college football season

1949 Wiley Wildcats football
- Conference: Southwestern Athletic Conference
- Record: 0–9–1 (0–6–1 SWAC)
- Head coach: Eolus Von Rettig (1st season)
- Home stadium: Wiley Field

1949 Southwestern Athletic Conference football standings
	Conf.					Overall
Team	W		L		T	W		L		T
No. 2 Southern +	6	–	0	–	1	10	–	0	–	1
No. 9 Langston +	6	–	0	–	1	8	–	1	–	1
No. 13 Prairie View A&M	5	–	2	–	0	8	–	3	–	0
No. T–27 Bishop	4	–	3	–	0	5	–	3	–	1
Texas College	2	–	4	–	1	2	–	6	–	2
No. 25 Arkansas AM&N	1	–	4	–	2	5	–	4	–	2
Samuel Huston	1	–	6	–	0	1	–	7	–	0
Wiley	0	–	6	–	1	0	–	9	–	1
$ – Conference champion; Rankings from the Pittsburgh Courier using the Dickinson Ratings System.

The 1949 Wiley Wildcats football team represented Wiley College as a member of the Southwestern Athletic Conference (SWAC) during the 1949 college football season. Led by first-year head coach Eolus Von Rettig, the Wildcats compiled an overall record of 0–9–1, with a conference record of 0–6–1, and finished eighth in the SWAC.

== Schedule ==
Date	Opponent	Site	Result	Attendance	Source
October 1	at Arkansas AM&N	Pumphrey Stadium; Pine Bluff, AR	T 13–13		
October 8	Grambling*	Wiley Field; Marshall, TX	L 0–20	2,000	
October 17	vs. Prairie View A&M	Cotton Bowl; Dallas, TX	L 7–27		
October 29	at Tillotson*	Yellow Jacket Stadium; Austin, TX	L 0–18		
November 5	Langston	Wiley Field; Marshall, TX	L 0–19		
November 12	at Southern	University Stadium; Baton Rouge, LA	L 0–37		
November 19	at Samuel Huston	Austin, TX	L 7–13		
November 24	Texas College^{†}	Wiley Field; Marshall, TX	L 0–20	6,000	
December 3	Bishop	Wiley Field; Marshall, TX	L 12–20		
December 10	at Texas State*	Buffalo Stadium; Houston, TX	L 0–12		
*Non-conference game; ^{†}Homecoming
