= 1937 Texas College Steers football team =

American college football season

1937 Texas College Steers football

SWAC champion
- Conference: Southwestern Athletic Conference
- Record: 8–0–1 (5–0–1 SWAC)
- Head coach: Eolus Von Rettig (2nd season)
- Home stadium: Fair Park

1937 Southwestern Athletic Conference football standings
	Conf.					Overall
Team	W		L		T	W		L		T
Texas College $	5	–	0	–	1	8	–	0	–	1
Arkansas AM&N	3	–	0	–	3	7	–	0	–	3
Prairie View	4	–	2	–	0	7	–	4	–	0
Langston	3	–	3	–	0	3	–	4	–	1
Wiley	2	–	3	–	1	5	–	5	–	1
Southern	1	–	4	–	1	4	–	4	–	1
Bishop	0	–	6	–	0	1	–	6	–	1
$ – Conference champion

The 1937 Texas College Steers football team was an American football team that represented Texas College as a member of the Southwestern Athletic Conference (SWAC) during the 1937 college football season. Led by second-year head coach Eolus Von Rettig, the Steers compiled an overall record of 8–0–1, with a conference mark of 5–0–1 and finished as SWAC champion.

== Schedule ==
Date	Opponent	Site	Result	Source
October 2	Prairie View	Fair Park; Tyler, TX	W 6–0	
October 9	at Jarvis*	Hawkins, TX	W 19–7	
October 16	Arkansas AM&N	Fair Park; Tyler, TX	T 6–6	
October 23	at Xavier (LA)*	Xavier Stadium; New Orleans, LA	W 26–0	
October 30	Langston	Lion Stadium; Tyler, TX	W 20–13	
November 6	at Samuel Huston*	Austin, TX	W 59–0	
November 13	at Southern	University Stadium; Baton Rouge, LA	W 7–0	
November 20	Bishop	Lion Stadium; Tyler, TX	W 12–0	
November 25	at Wiley	Fair Park Stadium; Marshall, TX	W 12–0	
*Non-conference game
