= 1949 Delaware Fightin' Blue Hens football team =

American college football season

1949 Delaware Fightin' Blue Hens football
- Conference: Independent
- Record: 8–1
- Head coach: William D. Murray (7th season)
- Captains: Jack Miller; Mariano Stalloni
- Home stadium: Wilmington Park

1949 Southern college football independents records
	Conf.			Overall
Team	W	L	T	W		L		T
Maryland State		–		8	–	0	–	0
Memphis State		–		9	–	1	–	0
Delaware		–		8	–	1	–	0
Virginia		–		7	–	2	–	0
Grambling		–		7	–	3	–	2
Miami (FL)		–		6	–	3	–	0
Sewanee		–		4	–	2	–	1
Chattanooga		–		5	–	4	–	0
Georgetown		–		5	–	5	–	0
West Virginia		–		4	–	6	–	1
Navy		–		3	–	5	–	1
Rollins		–		3	–	5	–	0
Texas State		–		3	–	6	–	1
Oklahoma City		–		2	–	8	–	0

The 1949 Delaware Fightin' Blue Hens football team was an American football team that represented the University of Delaware as an independent during the 1949 college football season. In its seventh season under head coach William D. Murray, the team compiled an 8–1 record and outscored opponents by a total of 202 to 67. On defense, the team gave up only eight touchdowns in nine games.

Fullback Mariano Stalloni was the team's leading rusher. Stallone and defensive tackle Jack Miller were the team co-captains. Other key players included linebacker Fred Schenck who intercepted six passes; end Jimmy Thomas who caught 30 passes for 365 yards and five touchdowns; and guard Ted Youngling.

The team played its home games at Wilmington Park in Wilmington, Delaware.

== Schedule ==
Date	Opponent	Site	Result	Attendance	Source
September 24	Pennsylvania Military	Wilmington Park; Wilmington, DE	W 29–0	9,000	
October 1	Richmond	Wilmington Park; Wilmington, DE	W 21–7	7,653	
October 8	at Bucknell	Memorial Stadium; Lewisburg, PA	L 7–13	5,500	
October 15	Rollins	Wilmington Park; Wilmington, DE	W 26–6		
October 22	at Lafayette	Fisher Field; Easton, PA	W 7–0	8,000	
October 29	at Muhlenberg	Allentown High School Stadium; Allentown, PA	W 25–13	5,000	
November 5	at Bradley	Peoria Stadium; Peoria, IL	W 47–7	7,000	
November 12	at Washington and Lee	Wilson Field; Lexington, VA	W 13–7	5,000	
November 19	West Chester	Wilmington Park; Wilmington, DE (rivalry)	W 27–14	10,000	
