= 1949 South Carolina Gamecocks football team =

American college football season

1949 South Carolina Gamecocks football
- Conference: Southern Conference
- Record: 4–6 (3–3 SoCon)
- Head coach: Rex Enright (9th season)
- Captain: Cecil Woolbright
- Home stadium: Carolina Municipal Stadium

1949 Southern Conference football standings
	Conf.					Overall
Team	W		L		T	W		L		T
No. 16 North Carolina $	5	–	0	–	0	7	–	4	–	0
No. 14 Maryland	4	–	0	–	0	9	–	1	–	0
Washington and Lee	3	–	1	–	1	3	–	5	–	1
Duke	4	–	2	–	0	6	–	3	–	0
William & Mary	4	–	2	–	0	6	–	4	–	0
VMI	3	–	2	–	1	3	–	5	–	1
The Citadel	2	–	2	–	0	4	–	5	–	0
Clemson	2	–	2	–	0	4	–	4	–	2
Furman	3	–	3	–	0	3	–	6	–	0
South Carolina	3	–	3	–	0	4	–	6	–	0
Wake Forest	3	–	3	–	0	4	–	6	–	0
George Washington	2	–	3	–	0	4	–	5	–	0
NC State	3	–	6	–	0	3	–	7	–	0
VPI	1	–	5	–	2	1	–	7	–	2
Richmond	2	–	6	–	0	3	–	7	–	0
Davidson	1	–	5	–	0	2	–	8	–	0
$ – Conference champion; Rankings from AP Poll

The 1949 South Carolina Gamecocks football team was an American football team that represented the University of South Carolina as a member of the Southern Conference (SoCon) during the 1949 college football season. In their ninth season under head coach Rex Enright, the Gamecocks compiled an overall record of 4–6 with a mark of 3–3 in conference play, tying for seventh place in the SoCon.

== Schedule ==
Date	Opponent	Site	Result	Attendance	Source
September 24	at Baylor*	Waco Stadium; Waco, TX	L 6–20	15,000	
September 30	Furman	Carolina Stadium; Columbia, SC	L 7–14		
October 8	at No. 6 North Carolina	Kenan Memorial Stadium; Chapel Hill, NC(rivalry)	L 13–28	28,000	
October 20	Clemson	Carolina Stadium; Columbia, SC (rivalry)	W 27–13	35,000	
October 29	Maryland	Byrd Stadium; College Park, MD	L 7–44	17,762	
November 5	at Marquette*	Marquette Stadium; Milwaukee, WI	W 6–3	15,000	
November 11	at Miami (FL)*	Burdine Stadium; Miami, FL	L 7–13	34,185	
November 19	at Georgia Tech*	Grant Field; Atlanta, GA	L 3–13	20,000	
November 26	Wake Forest	Carolina Stadium; Columbia, SC	W 27–20	20,000	
December 3	The Citadel	Carolina Stadium; Columbia, SC	W 42–0		
*Non-conference game; Rankings from AP Poll released prior to the game
