= 1949 Southern Jaguars football team =

American college football season

1949 Southern Jaguars football

Black college national co-champion SWAC champion
- Conference: Southwestern Athletic Conference
- Record: 10–0–1 (6–0–1 SWAC)
- Head coach: Ace Mumford (14th season)
- Home stadium: University Stadium

1949 Southwestern Athletic Conference football standings
	Conf.					Overall
Team	W		L		T	W		L		T
No. 2 Southern +	6	–	0	–	1	10	–	0	–	1
No. 9 Langston +	6	–	0	–	1	8	–	1	–	1
No. 13 Prairie View A&M	5	–	2	–	0	8	–	3	–	0
No. T–27 Bishop	4	–	3	–	0	5	–	3	–	1
Texas College	2	–	4	–	1	2	–	6	–	2
No. 25 Arkansas AM&N	1	–	4	–	2	5	–	4	–	2
Samuel Huston	1	–	6	–	0	1	–	7	–	0
Wiley	0	–	6	–	1	0	–	9	–	1
$ – Conference champion; Rankings from the Pittsburgh Courier using the Dickinson Ratings System.

The 1949 Southern Jaguars football team was an American football team that represented Southern University in the Southwestern Athletic Conference (SWAC) during the 1949 college football season. In their 14th season under head coach Ace Mumford, the Jaguars compiled a 10–0–1 record (6–0–1 against SWAC opponents), won the SWAC championship, and outscored all opponents by a total of 405 to 65. The team played its home games at University Stadium in Baton Rouge, Louisiana. The team was recognized by some as the black college national champion, though the Pittsburgh Courier with its Dickinson Rating System rated Southern at No. 2 behind Morgan State.

== Schedule ==
Date	Opponent	Site	Result	Attendance	Source
September 24	Texas State*	University Stadium; Baton Rouge, LA	W 41–0		
October 1	at Wilberforce State*	Wilberforce Stadium; Wilberforce, OH	W 20–18		
October 8	vs. Samuel Huston	Port Arthur, TX	W 34–0		
October 15	Arkansas AM&N	University Stadium; Baton Rouge, LA	W 47–6	7,000	
October 22	at Langston	Anderson Field; Langston, OK	T 14–14		
October 29	Texas College^{†}	University Stadium; Baton Rouge, LA	W 41–7	8,000	
November 5	vs. Bishop	Lobo Stadium; Longview, TX	W 14–7	3,500	
November 12	Wiley	University Stadium; Baton Rouge, LA	W 37–0		
November 19	at Florida A&M*	Bragg Stadium; Tallahassee, FL	W 31–13	8,000	
November 26	Prairie View A&M	University Stadium; Baton Rouge, LA	W 39–0		
December 3	at Xavier (LA)*	Xavier Stadium; New Orleans, LA (Pelican State Classic)	W 87–0	7,500	
*Non-conference game; ^{†}Homecoming
