= Sam B. Taylor =

American baseball player and football coach

Biographical details
- Born: February 26, 1898; Doswell, Virginia, U.S.
- Died: April 1, 1966 (aged 68); Lexington, Kentucky, U.S.

Playing career

Football
- 1921–1923: Northwestern

Baseball
- 1926: Dayton Marcos
- Positions: End (football); First baseman (baseball)

Coaching career (HC unless noted)

Football
- 1924: Virginia Normal
- 1925–1929: Clark (GA)
- 1930–1943: Prairie View
- 1945–1948: Virginia Union
- 1949–1958: Bluefield State
- 1959–1961: Kentucky State

Basketball
- 1924–1925: Virginia State
- 1925–1930: Clark (GA)

Baseball
- 1926–1930: Clark (GA)

Administrative career (AD unless noted)
- 1949–1958: Bluefield State

Head coaching record
- Overall: 182–128–30 (football)
- Bowls: 10–6

Accomplishments and honors

Championships
- Football; 3 SWAC (1931, 1933)

Sam B. Taylor
- First baseman

Negro league baseball debut
- 1926, for the Dayton Marcos

Last appearance
- 1926, for the Dayton Marcos

Teams
- Dayton Marcos (1926)

Samuel Brown Taylor (February 26, 1898 – April 1, 1966) was an American educator, Negro league baseball player, and college football coach. He served as the head football coach at Virginia State College for Negroes—now known as Virginia State University—in 1925, Clark University—now known as Clark Atlanta University—from 1925 to 1929, Prairie View State Normal & Industrial College—now known as Prairie View A&M University—from 1930 to 1943, Virginia Union University from 1945 to 1948, Bluefield State College—now known as Bluefield State University—from 1948 to 1958, and Kentucky State College—now known as Kentucky State University—from 1959 to 1961.

== Playing career ==
A native of Doswell, Virginia, Taylor attended Northwestern University. He played Negro league baseball for the Dayton Marcos in 1926.

== Educator ==
In 1943, Taylor was named the "Supervisor of Negro Education" for the state of Kentucky. He was one of the primary educators in the state of Kentucky responsible for de-segregation of public schools after the Brown v. Board of Education ruling in 1954.

== Coaching career ==
=== Virginia State ===
Taylor began his coaching career at the Virginia Normal School and Industrial Institute (now known as Virginia State University) as its first men's basketball coach in 1924–25.

=== Clark ===
In September 1925, Taylor and his new bride, Lullene Perrin, moved to Clark College–now known as Clark Atlanta University–in Atlanta, where Taylor coached football until 1930. He also coached basketball and baseball at Clark.

=== Prairie View ===
In 1930, Taylor was hired as head coach at Prairie View State Normal & Industrial College—now known as Prairie View A&M University—in Prairie View, Texas.

=== Virginia Union ===
Taylor took over the reins as head football coach and track coach at Virginia Union University in 1945 after the war. Once again, Lewis "Jack Rabbit" Smith teamed up with Taylor and ran under the maroon and steel colors of Virginia Union.

In 1948, the Virginia Union football team defeated Jake Gaither's Florida A&M Rattlers in the Orange Blossom Classic, 39–18.

=== Bluefield State ===
In the summer of 1949, Taylor was hired as the head football coach at Bluefield State College—now known as Bluefield State University—in Bluefield, West Virginia. He coached at Bluefield State until late spring 1959.

=== Kentucky State ===
Taylor was the 13th head football coach at Kentucky State University in Frankfort, Kentucky from 1959 until midway through the 1961 season when Mel Whedbee took charge of the team. Hip replacement surgery sidelined Taylor as the football coach, but he continued to coach track. In 1965, Taylor had the fastest quarter mile runner in the country.

== Death and honors ==
After a lengthy illness, Taylor died in Lexington, Kentucky in 1966 at age 68. He was inducted into the K-Club Athletic Hall of Fame October 2009.

== Head coaching record ==
=== Football ===
Year	Team	Overall	Conference	Standing	Bowl/playoffs
Virginia Normal Trojans (Colored Intercollegiate Athletic Association) (1924)
1924	Virginia Normal	5–3–3	1–2–3	T–4th	
Virginia Normal:		5–3–3	1–2–3		
Clark Panthers (Southern Intercollegiate Athletic Conference) (1925–1929)
1925	Clark	4–2–1	3–1		
1926	Clark	2–3–1	2–3	T–6th	
1927	Clark	5–1–2	4–1–2	2nd	
1928	Clark	6–1–1	5–1–1	T–1st (Note: No conference champion was recognized by the Southern Intercollegiate Athletic Conference (SIAC) in 1928.)	
1929	Clark	6–2–1			
Clark:		23–9–6			
Prairie View Panthers (Southwestern Athletic Conference) (1930–1943)
1930	Prairie View	8–3	3–1	2nd	L Prairie View
1931	Prairie View	9–1	4–0	1st	W Prairie View
1932	Prairie View	6–3–2	2–2–1	3rd	W Prairie View
1933	Prairie View	7–1	4–1	T–1st	W Prairie View
1934	Prairie View	5–4	2–3	4th	L Prairie View
1935	Prairie View	4–3–4	1–1–4	4th	L Prairie View
1936	Prairie View	4–4–2	1–3–2	6th	W Orange Blossom Classic, L Prairie View
1937	Prairie View	7–4	4–2	3rd	W Prairie View
1938	Prairie View	4–2–3	2–2–2	3rd	W Prairie View
1939	Prairie View	5–2–1	3–2–1	T–2nd	W Prairie View
1940	Prairie View	6–3	4–2	3rd	W Prairie View
1941	Prairie View	7–1–2	4–0–2	1st (Note: Prairie View's 1941 conference title was forfeited after the SWAC ruled at its winter meeting, on December 13, that the Panthers had used an ineligible player, Whiteside.)	L Prairie View
1942	Prairie View	5–2	3–1	2nd	L Prairie View
1943	Prairie View	6–2–1			W Prairie View
Prairie View:		83–35–15	37–20–12		
Virginia Union Panthers (Colored Intercollegiate Athletic Association) (1945–1948)
1945	Virginia Union	4–4	4–3	7th	
1946	Virginia Union	3–5–1	1–5–1	13th	
1947	Virginia Union	4–5	3–5	9th	
1948	Virginia Union	6–5	3–5	10th	W Orange Blossom Classic
Virginia Union:		17–19–1	11–18–1		
Bluefield State Big Blues (Colored/Central Intercollegiate Athletic Association) (1949–1958)
1949	Bluefield State	2–5–1	1–5–1	15th	
1950	Bluefield State	6–3–1	4–2–1	6th	
1951	Bluefield State	3–6	3–3	11th	
1952	Bluefield State	1–7	1–5	14th	
1953	Bluefield State	2–7	2–5	15th	
1954	Bluefield State	8–2	6–1	4th	
1955	Bluefield State	7–2–1	5–2–1	9th	
1956	Bluefield State	6–1	5–1	6th	
1957	Bluefield State	6–2	4–2	5th	
1958	Bluefield State	5–2–1	4–2	T–5th	
Bluefield State:		46–37–4	35–28–3		
Kentucky State (Midwest Athletic Association / Midwest Conference) (1959–1961)
1959	Kentucky State	3–5–1	1–1–1	2nd	
1960	Kentucky State	2–8	0–3	4th	
1961	Kentucky State	3–2 (Note: Taylor served as Kentucky State's head coach for the first five games of the 1961 season before ailing health forced him to hand control over the team over to Mel Whedbee. The Thorobreds finished the season with an overall record of 6–3 with a mark of 1–2 in conference play, placing third in the Midwest Athletic Association.)	0–1		
Kentucky State:		8–15–1	1–5–1		
Total:		182–128–30			
National championship Conference title Conference division title or championship game berth
