= 1949 Davidson Wildcats football team =

American college football season

1949 Davidson Wildcats football
- Conference: Southern Conference
- Record: 2–8 (1–5 SoCon)
- Head coach: Lefty Jamerson (2nd season)
- Home stadium: Richardson Stadium; American Legion Memorial Stadium

1949 Southern Conference football standings
	Conf.					Overall
Team	W		L		T	W		L		T
No. 16 North Carolina $	5	–	0	–	0	7	–	4	–	0
No. 14 Maryland	4	–	0	–	0	9	–	1	–	0
Washington and Lee	3	–	1	–	1	3	–	5	–	1
Duke	4	–	2	–	0	6	–	3	–	0
William & Mary	4	–	2	–	0	6	–	4	–	0
VMI	3	–	2	–	1	3	–	5	–	1
The Citadel	2	–	2	–	0	4	–	5	–	0
Clemson	2	–	2	–	0	4	–	4	–	2
Furman	3	–	3	–	0	3	–	6	–	0
South Carolina	3	–	3	–	0	4	–	6	–	0
Wake Forest	3	–	3	–	0	4	–	6	–	0
George Washington	2	–	3	–	0	4	–	5	–	0
NC State	3	–	6	–	0	3	–	7	–	0
VPI	1	–	5	–	2	1	–	7	–	2
Richmond	2	–	6	–	0	3	–	7	–	0
Davidson	1	–	5	–	0	2	–	8	–	0
$ – Conference champion; Rankings from AP Poll

The 1949 Davidson Wildcats football team was an American football team that represented Davidson College during the 1949 college football season as a member of the Southern Conference. In their second year under head coach Lefty Jamerson, the team compiled an overall record of 2–8, with a mark of 1–5 in conference play, and finished in last place in the SoCon.

== Schedule ==
Date	Opponent	Site	Result	Attendance	Source
September 24	at Army*	Michie Stadium; West Point, NY	L 7–47		
October 1	Presbyterian*	Richardson Stadium; Davidson, NC	L 7–27	8,000	
October 8	NC State	American Legion Memorial Stadium; Charlotte, NC	W 20–14		
October 15	at Saint Louis*	Walsh Stadium; St. Louis, MO	L 12–41	6,743	
October 22	Richmond^{†}	Richardson Stadium; Davidson, NC	L 7–28	10,000	
October 29	at Washington and Lee	Wilson Field; Lexington, VA	L 0–53		
November 5	at VMI	Wilson Field; Lexington, VA	L 6–47		
November 12	at Furman	Sirrine Stadium; Greenville, SC	L 6–21	8,000	
November 19	at Rollins*	Tangerine Bowl; Orlando, FL	W 25–0	5,000	
November 24	The Citadel	American Legion Memorial Stadium; Charlotte, NC	L 19–25	6,000	
*Non-conference game; ^{†}Homecoming
