= 1949 Furman Purple Hurricane football team =

American college football season

1949 Furman Purple Hurricane football
- Conference: Southern Conference
- Record: 3–6 (3–3 SoCon)
- Head coach: Red Smith (2nd season)
- Captain: George Pruitt
- Home stadium: Sirrine Stadium

1949 Southern Conference football standings
	Conf.					Overall
Team	W		L		T	W		L		T
No. 16 North Carolina $	5	–	0	–	0	7	–	4	–	0
No. 14 Maryland	4	–	0	–	0	9	–	1	–	0
Washington and Lee	3	–	1	–	1	3	–	5	–	1
Duke	4	–	2	–	0	6	–	3	–	0
William & Mary	4	–	2	–	0	6	–	4	–	0
VMI	3	–	2	–	1	3	–	5	–	1
The Citadel	2	–	2	–	0	4	–	5	–	0
Clemson	2	–	2	–	0	4	–	4	–	2
Furman	3	–	3	–	0	3	–	6	–	0
South Carolina	3	–	3	–	0	4	–	6	–	0
Wake Forest	3	–	3	–	0	4	–	6	–	0
George Washington	2	–	3	–	0	4	–	5	–	0
NC State	3	–	6	–	0	3	–	7	–	0
VPI	1	–	5	–	2	1	–	7	–	2
Richmond	2	–	6	–	0	3	–	7	–	0
Davidson	1	–	5	–	0	2	–	8	–	0
$ – Conference champion; Rankings from AP Poll

The 1949 Furman Purple Hurricane football team was an American football team that represented Furman University as a member of the Southern Conference (SoCon) during the 1949 college football season. In their second year under head coach Red Smith, the Purple Hurricane compiled an overall record of 3–6, with a conference mark of 3–3, and finished tied for seventh in the SoCon.

== Schedule ==
Date	Opponent	Site	Result	Attendance	Source
September 16	at Georgia*	Sanford Stadium; Athens, GA	L 0–25	15,000	
September 23	Washington and Lee	Sirrine Stadium; Greenville, SC	L 7–27		
September 30	at South Carolina	Carolina Stadium; Columbia, SC	W 14–7		
October 8	at Richmond	City Stadium; Richmond, VA	L 0–12	7,000	
October 14	Presbyterian*	Sirrine Stadium; Greenville, SC	L 13–20	11,000	
October 21	at The Citadel	Johnson Hagood Stadium; Charleston, SC (rivalry)	W 19–7		
October 29	at Florida*	Florida Field; Gainesville, FL	L 27–28	9,000	
November 12	Davidson	Sirrine Stadium; Greenville, SC	W 21–6	8,000	
November 19	Clemson	Sirrine Stadium; Greenville, SC	L 21–28	18,000	
*Non-conference game
