= 1949 Baylor Bears football team =

American college football season

1949 Baylor Bears football
- Conference: Southwest Conference

Ranking
- AP: No. 20 (tie)
- Record: 8–2 (4–2 SWC)
- Head coach: Bob Woodruff (3rd season)
- Captain: Don Mouser
- Home stadium: Municipal Stadium

1949 Southwest Conference football standings
	Conf.					Overall
Team	W		L		T	W		L		T
No. 5 Rice $	6	–	0	–	0	10	–	1	–	0
No. 20 Baylor	4	–	2	–	0	8	–	2	–	0
TCU	3	–	3	–	0	6	–	3	–	1
Texas	3	–	3	–	0	6	–	4	–	0
SMU	2	–	3	–	1	5	–	4	–	1
Arkansas	2	–	4	–	0	5	–	5	–	0
Texas A&M	0	–	5	–	1	1	–	8	–	1
$ – Conference champion; Rankings from AP Poll

The 1949 Baylor Bears football team represented Baylor University in the Southwest Conference (SWC) during the 1949 college football season. In their third and final season under head coach Bob Woodruff, the Bears compiled an 8–2 record (6–1 against conference opponents), finished in second place in the conference, were ranked No. 20 in the final AP Poll, and outscored all opponents by a combined total of 232 to 126. They played their home games at Municipal Stadium in Waco, Texas. Don Mouser was the team captain.

== Schedule ==
Date	Opponent	Rank	Site	Result	Attendance	Source
September 24	South Carolina*		Municipal Stadium; Waco, TX	W 20–6	15,000	
October 1	at Mississippi State*		Scott Field; Starkville, MS	W 14–6	15,000	
October 8	Arkansas		Municipal Stadium; Waco, TX	W 35–13	14,000	
October 15	at Texas Tech*	No. 20	Jones Stadium; Lubbock, TX (rivalry)	W 28–7	18,000–19,000	
October 22	at Texas A&M	No. 11	Kyle Field; College Station, TX (rivalry)	W 21–0		
October 29	TCU^{†}	No. 10	Municipal Stadium; Waco, TX (rivalry)	W 40–14	20,000	
November 5	at Texas	No. 6	Memorial Stadium; Austin, TX (rivalry)	L 0–20	60,000	
November 12	Wyoming*		Municipal Stadium; Waco, TX	W 32–13		
November 19	at No. 10 SMU	No. 15	Cotton Bowl; Dallas, TX	W 35–26	63,000	
November 26	at No. 7 Rice	No. 9	Rice Field; Houston, TX	L 7–21	32,000	
*Non-conference game; ^{†}Homecoming; Rankings from AP Poll released prior to the game

== Rankings ==
Ranking movements Legend: ██ Increase in ranking ██ Decrease in ranking — = Not ranked т = Tied with team above or below
	Week								
Poll	1	2	3	4	5	6	7	8	Final
AP	—	20	11	10	6	—	15	9	20т
