= 1949 Chattanooga Moccasins football team =

American college football season

1949 Chattanooga Moccasins football
- Conference: Independent
- Record: 5–4
- Head coach: Scrappy Moore (19th season)
- Captain: Ken Naylor
- Home stadium: Chamberlain Field

1949 Southern college football independents records
	Conf.			Overall
Team	W	L	T	W		L		T
Maryland State		–		8	–	0	–	0
Memphis State		–		9	–	1	–	0
Delaware		–		8	–	1	–	0
Virginia		–		7	–	2	–	0
Grambling		–		7	–	3	–	2
Miami (FL)		–		6	–	3	–	0
Sewanee		–		4	–	2	–	1
Chattanooga		–		5	–	4	–	0
Georgetown		–		5	–	5	–	0
West Virginia		–		4	–	6	–	1
Navy		–		3	–	5	–	1
Rollins		–		3	–	5	–	0
Texas State		–		3	–	6	–	1
Oklahoma City		–		2	–	8	–	0

The 1949 Chattanooga Moccasins football team was an American football team that represented the University of Chattanooga (now known as the University of Tennessee at Chattanooga) as an independent during the 1948 college football season. In its 19th year under head coach Scrappy Moore, the team compiled a 5–4 record.

== Schedule ==
Date	Opponent	Site	Result	Attendance	Source
September 23	at Georgia	Sanford Stadium; Athens, GA	L 6–42	12,500	
September 30	Abilene Christian	Chamberlain Field; Chattanooga, TN	W 14–7		
October 8	at Tennessee	Shields–Watkins Field; Knoxville, TN	L 7–39	15,000	
October 14	Oklahoma City	Chamberlain Field; Chattanooga, TN	W 34–7	6,000	
October 21	Mississippi Southern	Chamberlain Field; Chattanooga, TN	L 20–33	7,500	
October 28	Evansville	Chamberlain Field; Chattanooga, TN	W 21–17	5,500	
November 5	at Ole Miss	Hemingway Stadium; Oxford, MS	L 27–47		
November 11	Louisiana College	Chamberlain Field; Chattanooga, TN	W 40–7		
November 24	Duquesne	Chamberlain Field; Chattanooga, TN	W 13–0	8,000	
