= 1949 Langston Lions football team =

American college football season

1949 Langston Lions football

SWAC co-champion
- Conference: Southwestern Athletic Conference
- Record: 8–1–1 (6–0–1 SWAC)
- Head coach: Caesar Felton Gayles (20th season)
- Home stadium: Anderson Field

1949 Southwestern Athletic Conference football standings
	Conf.					Overall
Team	W		L		T	W		L		T
No. 2 Southern +	6	–	0	–	1	10	–	0	–	1
No. 9 Langston +	6	–	0	–	1	8	–	1	–	1
No. 13 Prairie View A&M	5	–	2	–	0	8	–	3	–	0
No. T–27 Bishop	4	–	3	–	0	5	–	3	–	1
Texas College	2	–	4	–	1	2	–	6	–	2
No. 25 Arkansas AM&N	1	–	4	–	2	5	–	4	–	2
Samuel Huston	1	–	6	–	0	1	–	7	–	0
Wiley	0	–	6	–	1	0	–	9	–	1
$ – Conference champion; Rankings from the Pittsburgh Courier using the Dickinson Ratings System.

The 1949 Langston Lions football team represented Langston University as a member of the Southwestern Athletic Conference (SWAC) during the 1949 college football season. Led by 20th-year head coach Caesar Felton Gayles, the Lions compiled an overall record of 8–1–1, with a conference record of 6–0–1, and finished as SWAC co-champion.

== Schedule ==
Date	Opponent	Site	Result	Attendance	Source
September 24	Bishop	Anderson Field; Langston, OK	W 13–0	3,000	
October 1	Tennessee A&I*	Anderson Field; Langston, OK	L 0–10	3,500	
October 8	at Lincoln (MO)*	Jefferson City, MO	W 39–0		
October 15	vs. Texas College	Farrington Field; Fort Worth, TX	W 27–21	5,000	
October 22	Southern	Anderson Field; Langston, OK	T 14–14		
October 29	Samuel Huston	Anderson Field; Langston, OK	W 27–7		
November 5	at Wiley	Wiley Field; Marshall, TX	W 19–0		
November 12	Arkansas AM&N^{†}	Anderson Field; Langston, OK	W 46–6		
November 19	at Prairie View A&M	Blackshear Field; Prairie View, TX	W 27–6	6,000	
November 26	vs. Texas State*	Indian Bowl; Muskogee, OK	W 32–0	3,000	
*Non-conference game; ^{†}Homecoming
