= 1949 Rollins Tars football team =

American college football season

1949 Rollins Tars football
- Conference: Independent
- Record: 3–5
- Head coach: Joe Justice (1st season)
- Home stadium: Tangerine Bowl

1949 Southern college football independents records
	Conf.			Overall
Team	W	L	T	W		L		T
Maryland State		–		8	–	0	–	0
Memphis State		–		9	–	1	–	0
Delaware		–		8	–	1	–	0
Virginia		–		7	–	2	–	0
Grambling		–		7	–	3	–	2
Miami (FL)		–		6	–	3	–	0
Sewanee		–		4	–	2	–	1
Chattanooga		–		5	–	4	–	0
Georgetown		–		5	–	5	–	0
West Virginia		–		4	–	6	–	1
Navy		–		3	–	5	–	1
Rollins		–		3	–	5	–	0
Texas State		–		3	–	6	–	1
Oklahoma City		–		2	–	8	–	0

The 1949 Rollins Tars football team was an American football team that represented Rollins College as an independent during the 1949 college football season. Led by Joe Justice in his first season as head coach, the Tars compiled an overall record of 3–5.

== Schedule ==
Date	Time	Opponent	Site	Result	Attendance	Source
September 30		at Miami (FL)	Burdine Stadium; Miami, FL	L 13–52	29,956	
October 7		at Tampa	Phillips Field; Tampa, FL	W 26–13		
October 15		at Delaware	Wilmington Park; Wilmington, DE	L 6–26		
October 21		Newberry	Tangerine Bowl; Orlando, FL	W 12–6	5,500	
November 5	3:00 p.m.	at Washington University	Francis Field; St. Louis, MO	L 0–21	7,500	
November 19		Davidson	Tangerine Bowl; Orlando, FL	L 0–25	5,000	
November 25		Muskingum	Tangerine Bowl; Orlando, FL	L 0–21		
December 2		Stetson	Tangerine Bowl; Orlando, FL	W 19–14		
All times are in Eastern time
