= Bob McNeish =

American football player and coach (1912–1999)

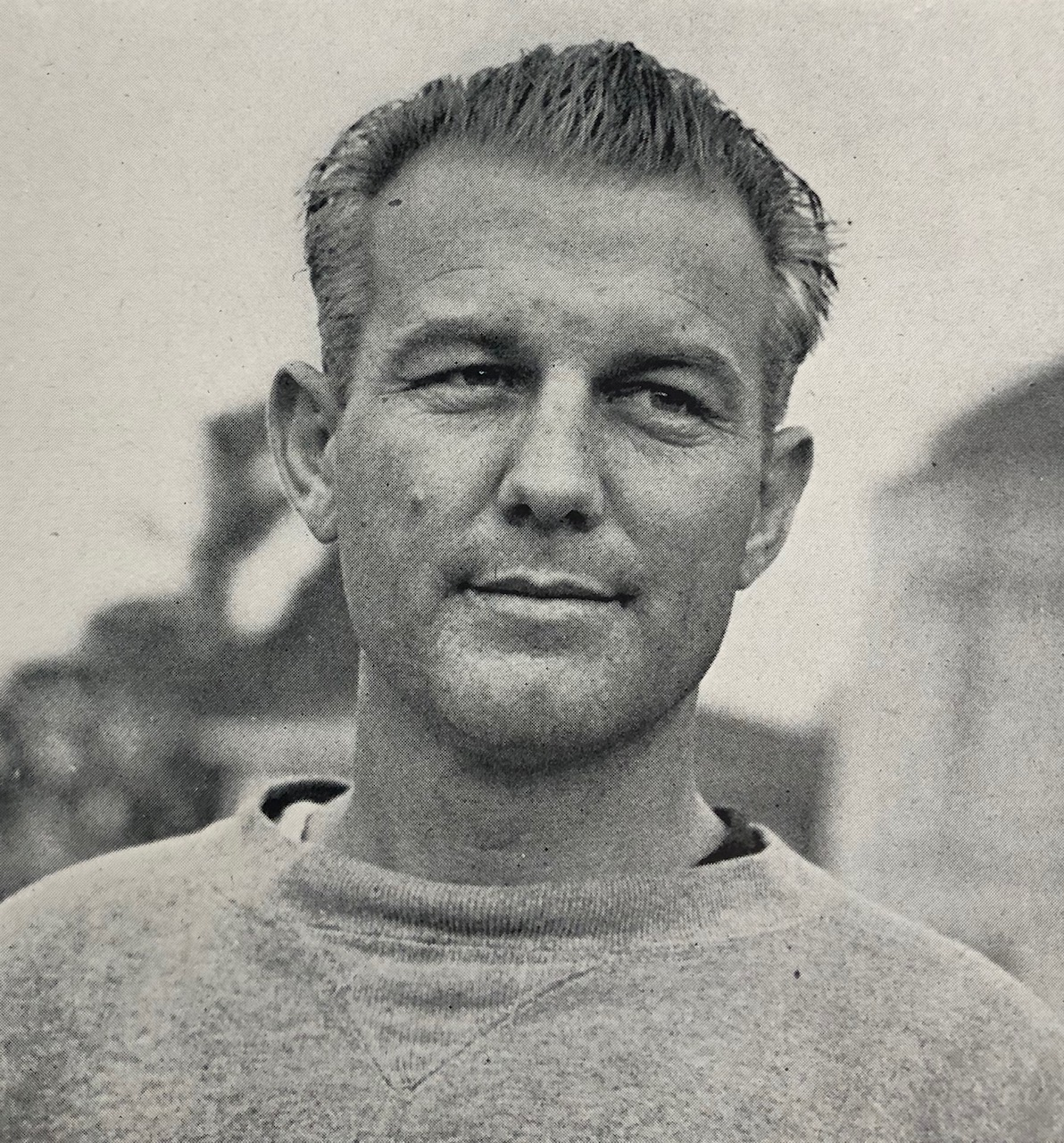
- McNeish from 1946 USC yearbook

Biographical details
- Born: July 15, 1912
- Died: February 27, 1999 (aged 86); San Gabriel, California, U.S.

Playing career
- 1931–1933: USC
- Position: Halfback

Coaching career (HC unless noted)
- 1934: San Bernardino
- 1935–1936: Pasadena
- 1937–1941: USC (backfield)
- 1942: Saint Mary's Pre-Flight (assistant)
- 1945: USC (backfield)
- 1946–1947: Navy (backfield)
- 1948–1950: VPI

Head coaching record
- Overall: 1–25–3 (college); 16–9–2 (junior college)

Robert C. McNeish (July 15, 1912 – February 27, 1999) was an American football player and coach. He served as the head football coach at Virginia Polytechnic Institute and State University from 1948 to 1950, compiling a record of 1–25–3. The lone win came against Richmond in 1949. McNeish played college football as a halfback at the University of Southern California (USC) from 1931 to 1933. His teams, coached by Howard Jones, went 30–2–1 in those three seasons, winning national championships and consecutive Rose Bowls in 1931 and 1932. McNeish served as an assistant coach at USC and at the United States Naval Academy. He died on February 27, 1999, in San Gabriel, California.

== Head coaching record ==
=== College ===
Year	Team	Overall	Conference	Standing	Bowl/playoffs
VPI Gobblers (Southern Conference) (1948–1950)
1948	VPI	0–8–1	0–6–1	15th	
1949	VPI	1–7–2	1–5–1	15th	
1950	VPI	0–10	0–8	17th	
VPI:		1–25–3	1–19–2		
Total:		1–25–3			

=== Junior college football ===
Year	Team	Overall	Conference	Standing	Bowl/playoffs
San Bernardino Indians (Eastern Conference) (1934)
1934	San Bernardino	4–5–1	2–3–1	5th	
San Bernardino:		4–5–1	2–3–1		
Pasadena Bulldogs (Independent) (1935–1936)
1935	Pasadena	3–4–1			
1936	Pasadena	9–0			
Pasadena:		12–4–1			
Total:		16–9–2			
