= 1949 Richmond Spiders football team =

American college football season

1949 Richmond Spiders football
- Conference: Southern Conference
- Record: 3–7 (2–6 SoCon)
- Head coach: Karl Esleeck (2nd season)
- Captain: Wes Curtier
- Home stadium: City Stadium

1949 Southern Conference football standings
	Conf.					Overall
Team	W		L		T	W		L		T
No. 16 North Carolina $	5	–	0	–	0	7	–	4	–	0
No. 14 Maryland	4	–	0	–	0	9	–	1	–	0
Washington and Lee	3	–	1	–	1	3	–	5	–	1
Duke	4	–	2	–	0	6	–	3	–	0
William & Mary	4	–	2	–	0	6	–	4	–	0
VMI	3	–	2	–	1	3	–	5	–	1
The Citadel	2	–	2	–	0	4	–	5	–	0
Clemson	2	–	2	–	0	4	–	4	–	2
Furman	3	–	3	–	0	3	–	6	–	0
South Carolina	3	–	3	–	0	4	–	6	–	0
Wake Forest	3	–	3	–	0	4	–	6	–	0
George Washington	2	–	3	–	0	4	–	5	–	0
NC State	3	–	6	–	0	3	–	7	–	0
VPI	1	–	5	–	2	1	–	7	–	2
Richmond	2	–	6	–	0	3	–	7	–	0
Davidson	1	–	5	–	0	2	–	8	–	0
$ – Conference champion; Rankings from AP Poll

The 1949 Richmond Spiders football team was an American football team that represented the University of Richmond as a member of the Southern Conference (SoCon) during the 1949 college football season. In their second season under head coach Karl Esleeck, Richmond compiled a 3–7 record, with a mark of 2–6 in conference play, finishing in 15th place in the SoCon.

== Schedule ==
Date	Opponent	Site	Result	Attendance	Source
September 17	Randolph–Macon*	City Stadium; Richmond, VA	W 27–0	12,000	
September 24	at Duke	Duke Stadium; Durham, NC	L 0–67	12,000	
October 1	at Delaware*	Wilmington Park; Wilmington, DE	L 7–21	7,653	
October 8	Furman	City Stadium; Richmond, VA	W 12–0	7,000	
October 15	VMI	City Stadium; Richmond, VA (Tobacco Bowl, rivalry)	L 7–14	12,000	
October 22	at Davidson	Richardson Stadium; Davidson, NC	W 28–7	10,000	
October 29	William & Mary	City Stadium; Richmond, VA (rivalry)	L 0–34	10,000	
November 5	at NC State	Riddick Stadium; Raleigh, NC	L 6–20	8,000	
November 12	VPI	City Stadium; Richmond, VA	L 13–28	7,000	
November 24	Washington and Lee	City Stadium; Richmond, VA	L 14–34	6,000	
*Non-conference game
