= 1949 North Carolina Tar Heels football team =

American college football season

1949 North Carolina Tar Heels football

SoCon champion

Cotton Bowl Classic, L 13–27 vs. Rice
- Conference: Southern Conference

Ranking
- AP: No. 16
- Record: 7–4 (5–0 SoCon)
- Head coach: Carl Snavely (7th season)
- Offensive scheme: Single-wing
- Captain: Charlie Justice
- Home stadium: Kenan Memorial Stadium

1949 Southern Conference football standings
	Conf.					Overall
Team	W		L		T	W		L		T
No. 16 North Carolina $	5	–	0	–	0	7	–	4	–	0
No. 14 Maryland	4	–	0	–	0	9	–	1	–	0
Washington and Lee	3	–	1	–	1	3	–	5	–	1
Duke	4	–	2	–	0	6	–	3	–	0
William & Mary	4	–	2	–	0	6	–	4	–	0
VMI	3	–	2	–	1	3	–	5	–	1
The Citadel	2	–	2	–	0	4	–	5	–	0
Clemson	2	–	2	–	0	4	–	4	–	2
Furman	3	–	3	–	0	3	–	6	–	0
South Carolina	3	–	3	–	0	4	–	6	–	0
Wake Forest	3	–	3	–	0	4	–	6	–	0
George Washington	2	–	3	–	0	4	–	5	–	0
NC State	3	–	6	–	0	3	–	7	–	0
VPI	1	–	5	–	2	1	–	7	–	2
Richmond	2	–	6	–	0	3	–	7	–	0
Davidson	1	–	5	–	0	2	–	8	–	0
$ – Conference champion; Rankings from AP Poll

The 1949 North Carolina Tar Heels football team represented the University of North Carolina at Chapel Hill during the 1949 college football season. The Tar Heels were led by seventh-year head coach Carl Snavely and played their home games at Kenan Memorial Stadium. The team competed as members of the Southern Conference, winning the conference title with a perfect 5–0 conference record.

Halfback Charlie Justice was named an All-American and finished second in voting for the Heisman Trophy for the second consecutive year. He led the team in rushing, passing, and punting for the fourth consecutive year, with 377 rushing yards, 731 passing yards, and 2,777 punting yards. Art Weiner again joined him as an All-American end, being voted first-team by United Press, Sporting News, and INS. Kenny Powell was selected as a first-team defensive end All-American by NEA.

== Schedule ==
Date	Time	Opponent	Rank	Site	Result	Attendance	Source
September 24	2:30 p.m.	NC State		Kenan Memorial Stadium; Chapel Hill, NC (rivalry)	W 26–6	44,000	
October 1	2:30 p.m.	Georgia*		Kenan Memorial Stadium; Chapel Hill, NC	W 21–14	44,000	
October 8	2:00 p.m.	at South Carolina	No. 6	Carolina Stadium; Columbia, SC (rivalry)	W 28–13	28,000	
October 15	2:00 p.m.	Wake Forest	No. 6	Kenan Memorial Stadium; Chapel Hill, NC (rivalry)	W 28–14	44,000	
October 22	9:00 p.m.	at LSU*	No. 6	Tiger Stadium; Baton Rouge, LA	L 7–13	44,000	
October 29	2:00 p.m.	Tennessee*	No. 13	Kenan Memorial Stadium; Chapel Hill, NC	L 6–35		
November 5	2:00 p.m.	at William & Mary		Cary Field; Williamsburg, VA	W 20–14	21,000	
November 12	1:30 p.m.	vs. No. 1 Notre Dame*		Yankee Stadium (I); Bronx, NY (rivalry)	L 6–42	67,000	
November 19	2:00 p.m.	at Duke		Duke Stadium; Durham, NC (Victory Bell)	W 21–20	57,500	
November 26	2:00 p.m.	Virginia*	No. 19	Kenan Memorial Stadium; Chapel Hill, NC (South's Oldest Rivalry)	W 14–7	44,500	
January 2, 1950	2:00 p.m.	vs. No. 5 Rice*	No. 16	Cotton Bowl; Dallas, TX (Cotton Bowl Classic)	L 13–27	72,347	
*Non-conference game; Rankings from AP Poll released prior to the game; All times are in Eastern time

== Rankings ==
Ranking movements Legend: ██ Increase in ranking ██ Decrease in ranking — = Not ranked ( ) = First-place votes
	Week								
Poll	1	2	3	4	5	6	7	8	Final
AP	6 (3)	6 (3)	6 (6)	13	—	—	—	19	16
