= 1949 Washington and Lee Generals football team =

American college football season

1949 Washington and Lee Generals football
- Conference: Southern Conference
- Record: 3–5–1 (3–1–1 SoCon)
- Head coach: George T. Barclay (1st season)
- Home stadium: Wilson Field

1949 Southern Conference football standings
	Conf.					Overall
Team	W		L		T	W		L		T
No. 16 North Carolina $	5	–	0	–	0	7	–	4	–	0
No. 14 Maryland	4	–	0	–	0	9	–	1	–	0
Washington and Lee	3	–	1	–	1	3	–	5	–	1
Duke	4	–	2	–	0	6	–	3	–	0
William & Mary	4	–	2	–	0	6	–	4	–	0
VMI	3	–	2	–	1	3	–	5	–	1
The Citadel	2	–	2	–	0	4	–	5	–	0
Clemson	2	–	2	–	0	4	–	4	–	2
Furman	3	–	3	–	0	3	–	6	–	0
South Carolina	3	–	3	–	0	4	–	6	–	0
Wake Forest	3	–	3	–	0	4	–	6	–	0
George Washington	2	–	3	–	0	4	–	5	–	0
NC State	3	–	6	–	0	3	–	7	–	0
VPI	1	–	5	–	2	1	–	7	–	2
Richmond	2	–	6	–	0	3	–	7	–	0
Davidson	1	–	5	–	0	2	–	8	–	0
$ – Conference champion; Rankings from AP Poll

The 1949 Washington and Lee Generals football team was an American football team that represented Washington and Lee University during the 1949 college football season as a member of the Southern Conference. In their first year under head coach George T. Barclay, the team compiled an overall record of 3–5–1, with a mark of 3–1–1 in conference play.

== Schedule ==
Date	Opponent	Site	Result	Attendance	Source
September 23	at Furman	Sirrine Stadium; Greenville, SC	W 27–7		
October 1	vs. West Virginia*	Laidley Field; Charleston, WV	L 20–28	10,000	
October 8	at Georgia Tech*	Grant Field; Atlanta, GA	L 0–36	22,000	
October 15	at Virginia*	Scott Stadium; Charlottesville, VA	L 7–27	17,000	
October 21	at George Washington	Griffith Stadium; Washington, DC	L 19–21	13,657	
October 29	Davidson	Wilson Field; Lexington, VA	W 53–0		
November 5	vs. VPI	Municipal Stadium; Lynchburg, VA	T 6–6	7,000	
November 12	Delaware*	Wilson Field; Lexington, VA	L 7–14	5,000	
November 24	at Richmond	City Stadium; Richmond, VA	W 34–14	6,000	
*Non-conference game
