= 1949 Grambling Tigers football team =

American college football season

1949 Grambling Tigers football
- Conference: Independent
- Record: 7–3–2
- Head coach: Eddie Robinson (7th season)
- Home stadium: Tiger Stadium

1949 Southern college football independents records
	Conf.			Overall
Team	W	L	T	W		L		T
Maryland State		–		8	–	0	–	0
Memphis State		–		9	–	1	–	0
Delaware		–		8	–	1	–	0
Virginia		–		7	–	2	–	0
Grambling		–		7	–	3	–	2
Miami (FL)		–		6	–	3	–	0
Sewanee		–		4	–	2	–	1
Chattanooga		–		5	–	4	–	0
Georgetown		–		5	–	5	–	0
West Virginia		–		4	–	6	–	1
Navy		–		3	–	5	–	1
Rollins		–		3	–	5	–	0
Texas State		–		3	–	6	–	1
Oklahoma City		–		2	–	8	–	0

The 1949 Grambling Tigers football team represented Grambling College (now known as Grambling State University) as an independent during the 1949 college football season. Led by seventh-year head coach Eddie Robinson, the Tigers compiled an overall record of 7–3–2.

== Schedule ==
Date	Opponent	Site	Result	Attendance	Source
September 24	at Texas College	Steer Stadium; Tyler, TX	W 7–0		
October 1	Maryland State	Tiger Stadium; Grambling, LA	L 8–14	6,581	
October 8	at Wiley	Marshall, TX	W 20–0	2,000	
October 15	Wilberforce	Tiger Stadium; Grambling, LA	L 7–26	6,500	
October 22	Fort Valley State	Tiger Stadium; Grambling, LA	W 54–0		
October 31	vs. Tuskegee	State Fair Stadium; Shreveport, LA	W 55–0		
November 4	at Texas State	Buffalo Stadium; Houston, TX	L 7–15		
November 12	Prairie View A&M	Tiger Stadium; Grambling, LA	W 14–13		
November 19	Bishop^{†}	Tiger Stadium; Grambling, LA	T 7–7	8,000	
November 26	at Alcorn A&M	Alumni Field; Jackson, MS	T 7–7		
November 30	vs. Bethune–Cookman	Memorial Field; Oakdale, LA	W 18–13		
December 3	vs. Sam Houston College	Tech Stadium; Ruston, LA	W 34–0	8,000	
^{†}Homecoming
