= 1949 Texas State Tigers football team =

American college football season

1949 Texas State Tigers football
- Conference: Independent
- Record: 3–6–1
- Head coach: Alexander Durley (1st season)
- Home stadium: Buffalo Stadium

1949 Southern college football independents records
	Conf.			Overall
Team	W	L	T	W		L		T
Maryland State		–		8	–	0	–	0
Memphis State		–		9	–	1	–	0
Delaware		–		8	–	1	–	0
Virginia		–		7	–	2	–	0
Grambling		–		7	–	3	–	2
Miami (FL)		–		6	–	3	–	0
Sewanee		–		4	–	2	–	1
Chattanooga		–		5	–	4	–	0
Georgetown		–		5	–	5	–	0
West Virginia		–		4	–	6	–	1
Navy		–		3	–	5	–	1
Rollins		–		3	–	5	–	0
Texas State		–		3	–	6	–	1
Oklahoma City		–		2	–	8	–	0

The 1949 Texas State Tigers football team was an American football team that represented Texas State University for Negroes (now known as Texas Southern University) as an independent during the 1949 college football season. Led by first-year head coach Alexander Durley, the Tigers compiled an overall record of 3–6–1.

== Schedule ==
Date	Opponent	Site	Result	Attendance	Source
September 24	at Southern	University Stadium; Baton Rouge, LA	L 0–41		
October 1	Tillotson	Buffalo Stadium; Houston, TX	W 25–12	3,200	
October 8	at Bishop	Marshall, TX	L 0–20		
October 22	vs. Samuel Huston	Alamo Stadium; San Antonio, TX	L 0–15		
October 29	Prairie View A&M	Buffalo Stadium; Houston, TX (rivalry)	L 0–13		
November 4	Grambling	Buffalo Stadium; Houston, TX	W 15–7		
November 19	at Texas College	Steer Stadium; Tyler, TX	T 13–13		
November 26	vs. Langston	Indian Bowl; Muskogee, OK	L 0–32	3,000	
December 3	at Arkansas AM&N	Pine Bluff, AR	L 18–19		
December 10	Wiley	Buffalo Stadium; Houston, TX	W 12–0		
