= 1949 Prairie View A&M Panthers football team =

American college football season

1949 Prairie View A&M Panthers football

Prairie View Bowl, W 27–6 vs. Fisk
- Conference: Southwestern Athletic Conference
- Record: 8–3 (5–2 SWAC)
- Head coach: James A. Stevens (1st season)
- Home stadium: Blackshear Field

1949 Southwestern Athletic Conference football standings
	Conf.					Overall
Team	W		L		T	W		L		T
No. 2 Southern +	6	–	0	–	1	10	–	0	–	1
No. 9 Langston +	6	–	0	–	1	8	–	1	–	1
No. 13 Prairie View A&M	5	–	2	–	0	8	–	3	–	0
No. T–27 Bishop	4	–	3	–	0	5	–	3	–	1
Texas College	2	–	4	–	1	2	–	6	–	2
No. 25 Arkansas AM&N	1	–	4	–	2	5	–	4	–	2
Samuel Huston	1	–	6	–	0	1	–	7	–	0
Wiley	0	–	6	–	1	0	–	9	–	1
$ – Conference champion; Rankings from the Pittsburgh Courier using the Dickinson Ratings System.

The 1949 Prairie View A&M Panthers football team was an American football team that represented Prairie View A&M College of Texas (now known as Prairie View A&M University) as a member of the Southwestern Athletic Conference (SWAC) during the 1949 college football season. In their first season under head coach James A. Stevens, the Panthers compiled an overall record of 8–3, with a mark of 5–2 in conference play, and finished third in the SWAC.

== Schedule ==
Date	Opponent	Site	Result	Attendance	Source
September 24	vs. Samuel Huston	Buffalo Stadium; Houston, TX	W 27–0		
October 1	at Bishop	Tiger Field; Marshall, TX	W 13–9		
October 8	vs. Tillotson*	Alamo Stadium; San Antonio, TX	W 21–20	2,475	
October 17	vs. Wiley	Cotton Bowl; Dallas, TX	W 27–7		
October 22	at Arkansas AM&N	Athletic Field; Pine Bluff, AR	W 55–6		
October 29	at Texas State*	Buffalo Stadium; Houston, TX (rivalry)	W 13–0		
November 5	at Texas College	Steer Stadium; Tyler, TX	W 14–6	8,000	
November 12	at Grambling*	Tiger Stadium; Grambling, LA	L 13–14		
November 19	Langston	Blackshear Field; Prairie View, TX	L 6–27		
November 26	at Southern	University Stadium; Baton Rouge, LA	L 0–39		
January 2	vs. Fisk*	Buffalo Stadium; Houston, TX (Prairie View Bowl)	W 27–6	4,718	
*Non-conference game
