= 1949 VMI Keydets football team =

American college football season

1949 VMI Keydets football
- Conference: Southern Conference
- Record: 3–5–1 (3–2–1 SoCon)
- Head coach: Tom Nugent (1st season)
- Home stadium: Alumni Field; Wilson Field

1949 Southern Conference football standings
	Conf.					Overall
Team	W		L		T	W		L		T
No. 16 North Carolina $	5	–	0	–	0	7	–	4	–	0
No. 14 Maryland	4	–	0	–	0	9	–	1	–	0
Washington and Lee	3	–	1	–	1	3	–	5	–	1
Duke	4	–	2	–	0	6	–	3	–	0
William & Mary	4	–	2	–	0	6	–	4	–	0
VMI	3	–	2	–	1	3	–	5	–	1
The Citadel	2	–	2	–	0	4	–	5	–	0
Clemson	2	–	2	–	0	4	–	4	–	2
Furman	3	–	3	–	0	3	–	6	–	0
South Carolina	3	–	3	–	0	4	–	6	–	0
Wake Forest	3	–	3	–	0	4	–	6	–	0
George Washington	2	–	3	–	0	4	–	5	–	0
NC State	3	–	6	–	0	3	–	7	–	0
VPI	1	–	5	–	2	1	–	7	–	2
Richmond	2	–	6	–	0	3	–	7	–	0
Davidson	1	–	5	–	0	2	–	8	–	0
$ – Conference champion; Rankings from AP Poll

The 1949 VMI Keydets football team was an American football team that represented the Virginia Military Institute (VMI) during the 1949 college football season as a member of the Southern Conference. In their first year under head coach Tom Nugent, the team compiled an overall record of 3–5–1.

== Schedule ==
Date	Opponent	Site	Result	Attendance	Source
September 24	Quantico Marines*	Alumni Field; Lexington, VA	L 7–14	6,000	
October 1	vs. George Washington	City Stadium; Lynchburg, VA	W 14–7		
October 8	at William & Mary	Cary Field; Williamsburg, VA (rivalry)	L 6–54	10,000	
October 15	at Richmond	City Stadium; Richmond, VA (Tobacco Bowl, rivalry)	W 14–7	12,000	
October 22	vs. Virginia*	City Stadium; Lynchburg, VA	L 13–32	10,000	
October 29	at No. 2 Army*	Michie Stadium; West Point, NY	L 14–40	15,555	
November 5	Davidson^{†}	Wilson Field; Lexington, VA	W 47–6		
November 12	at The Citadel	Johnson Hagood Stadium; Charleston, SC (rivalry)	L 14–19	8,000	
November 24	vs. VPI	Victory Stadium; Roanoke, VA (rivalry)	T 28–28	25,500	
*Non-conference game; ^{†}Homecoming; Rankings from AP Poll released prior to the game
