= 1949 Miami Hurricanes football team =

American college football season

1949 Miami Hurricanes football
- Conference: Independent
- Record: 6–3
- Head coach: Andy Gustafson (2nd season)
- Home stadium: Burdine Stadium

1949 Southern college football independents records
	Conf.			Overall
Team	W	L	T	W		L		T
Maryland State		–		8	–	0	–	0
Memphis State		–		9	–	1	–	0
Delaware		–		8	–	1	–	0
Virginia		–		7	–	2	–	0
Grambling		–		7	–	3	–	2
Miami (FL)		–		6	–	3	–	0
Sewanee		–		4	–	2	–	1
Chattanooga		–		5	–	4	–	0
Georgetown		–		5	–	5	–	0
West Virginia		–		4	–	6	–	1
Navy		–		3	–	5	–	1
Rollins		–		3	–	5	–	0
Texas State		–		3	–	6	–	1
Oklahoma City		–		2	–	8	–	0

The 1949 Miami Hurricanes football team represented the University of Miami as an independent during the 1949 college football season. Led by second-year head coach Andy Gustafson, the Hurricanes played their home games at Burdine Stadium in Miami, Florida. Miami finished the season 6–3.

== Schedule ==
Date	Opponent	Site	Result	Attendance	Source
September 30	Rollins	Burdine Stadium; Miami, FL	W 52–13	29,956	
October 8	at Louisville	duPont Manual Stadium; Louisville, KY (rivalry)	W 26–0	12,000	
October 14	Purdue	Burdine Stadium; Miami, FL	L 0–14	47,835	
October 21	Georgia	Burdine Stadium; Miami, FL	W 13–9	37,138	
November 4	Detroit	Burdine Stadium; Miami, FL	W 27–6	35,031	
November 11	South Carolina	Burdine Stadium; Miami, FL	W 13–7	34,185	
November 18	Florida	Burdine Stadium; Miami, FL (rivalry)	W 28–13	55,981	
November 25	No. 20 Kentucky	Burdine Stadium; Miami, FL	L 6–21	42,970	
December 2	No. 15 Maryland	Burdine Stadium; Miami, FL	L 0–13	34,886	
Rankings from AP Poll released prior to the game
