= 1949 West Virginia Mountaineers football team =

American college football season

1949 West Virginia Mountaineers football
- Conference: Independent
- Record: 4–6–1
- Head coach: Dudley DeGroot (2nd season)
- Captain: Peter Zinaich
- Home stadium: Mountaineer Field

1949 Southern college football independents records
	Conf.			Overall
Team	W	L	T	W		L		T
Maryland State		–		8	–	0	–	0
Memphis State		–		9	–	1	–	0
Delaware		–		8	–	1	–	0
Virginia		–		7	–	2	–	0
Grambling		–		7	–	3	–	2
Miami (FL)		–		6	–	3	–	0
Sewanee		–		4	–	2	–	1
Chattanooga		–		5	–	4	–	0
Georgetown		–		5	–	5	–	0
West Virginia		–		4	–	6	–	1
Navy		–		3	–	5	–	1
Rollins		–		3	–	5	–	0
Texas State		–		3	–	6	–	1
Oklahoma City		–		2	–	8	–	0

The 1949 West Virginia Mountaineers football team was an American football team that represented West Virginia University as an independent during the 1949 college football season. In its second and final season under head coach Dudley DeGroot, the team compiled a 4–6–1 record and was outscored by a total of 275 to 227. The team played its home games at Mountaineer Field in Morgantown, West Virginia. Peter Zinaich was the team captain.

== Schedule ==
Date	Opponent	Site	Result	Attendance	Source
September 17	Waynesburg	Mountaineer Field; Morgantown, WV	W 42–7		
September 24	at Ohio	Peden Stadium; Athens, OH	L 7–17	10,000	
October 1	vs. Washington and Lee	Laidley Field; Charleston, WV	W 28–20	10,000	
October 8	No. 19 Pittsburgh	Mountaineer Field; Morgantown, WV (rivalry)	L 7–20	31,005	
October 14	at Boston University	Fenway Park; Boston, MA	L 20–52	19,301	
October 22	Quantico Marines	Mountaineer Field; Morgantown, WV	W 47–26		
October 29	at Virginia	Scott Stadium; Charlottesville, VA	L 14–19	16,000	
November 5	Penn State^{†}	Mountaineer Field; Morgantown, WV (rivalry)	L 14–34	20,000–21,000	
November 12	Texas Western	Mountaineer Field; Morgantown, WV	T 13–13	10,000	
November 19	at Western Reserve	League Park; Cleveland, OH	W 28–20	1,000	
November 24	at No. 15 Maryland	Byrd Stadium; College Park, MD (rivalry)	L 7–47	16,117	
^{†}Homecoming; Rankings from AP Poll released prior to the game

== After the season ==
The following Mountaineers were selected in the 1950 NFL draft after the season.

Round	Pick	Player	Position	NFL club
9	115	Pete Zinach	Back	San Francisco 49ers
11	142	Fred Stuvek	Guard	Los Angeles Rams
13	159	Jack Morton	Back	New York Bulldogs
15	194	Dave Stephenson	Center	Los Angeles Rams
28	357	Ralph Shoaf	Back	Washington Redskins
