= 1949 Rice Owls football team =

American college football season

1949 Rice Owls football

SWC champion Cotton Bowl Classic champion

Cotton Bowl Classic, W 27–13 vs. North Carolina
- Conference: Southwest Conference

Ranking
- AP: No. 5
- Record: 10–1 (6–0 SWC)
- Head coach: Jess Neely (10th season)
- Home stadium: Rice Field

1949 Southwest Conference football standings
	Conf.					Overall
Team	W		L		T	W		L		T
No. 5 Rice $	6	–	0	–	0	10	–	1	–	0
No. 20 Baylor	4	–	2	–	0	8	–	2	–	0
TCU	3	–	3	–	0	6	–	3	–	1
Texas	3	–	3	–	0	6	–	4	–	0
SMU	2	–	3	–	1	5	–	4	–	1
Arkansas	2	–	4	–	0	5	–	5	–	0
Texas A&M	0	–	5	–	1	1	–	8	–	1
$ – Conference champion; Rankings from AP Poll

The 1949 Rice Owls football team was an American football team that represented Rice Institute during the 1949 college football season. The Owls were led by 10th-year head coach Jess Neely and played their home games at Rice Field in Houston, Texas. The team competed as a member of the Southwest Conference, winning the conference with an unbeaten record of 6–0. They ended the regular season with an overall record of 9–1, and were ranked fifth in the final AP Poll. Rice was invited to the 1950 Cotton Bowl Classic, where they defeated Southern Conference champion North Carolina.

== Schedule ==
Date	Opponent	Rank	Site	Result	Attendance	Source
September 24	Clemson*		Rice Field; Houston, TX	W 33–7		
October 1	at LSU*		Tiger Stadium; Baton Rouge, LA	L 7–14	30,000	
October 8	New Mexico*		Rice Field; Houston, TX	W 55–0	15,000	
October 15	at No. 10 SMU		Cotton Bowl; Dallas, TX (rivalry)	W 41–27	72,000	
October 22	at No. 10 Texas	No. 9	Memorial Stadium; Austin, TX (rivalry)	W 17–15	60,000	
October 29	Texas Tech*	No. 5	Rice Field; Houston, TX	W 28–0	18,000	
November 5	Arkansas	No. 8	Rice Field; Houston, TX	W 14–0	26,000	
November 12	Texas A&M	No. 7	Rice Field; Houston, TX	W 13–0	31,000	
November 19	at TCU	No. 6	Amon G. Carter Stadium; Fort Worth, TX	W 20–14		
November 26	No. 9 Baylor	No. 7	Rice Field; Houston, TX	W 21–7	32,000	
January 2	vs. No. 16 North Carolina*	No. 5	Cotton Bowl; Dallas, TX (Cotton Bowl Classic)	W 27–13	72,347	
*Non-conference game; Rankings from AP Poll released prior to the game

== Rankings ==
Ranking movements Legend: ██ Increase in ranking ██ Decrease in ranking — = Not ranked
	Week								
Poll	1	2	3	4	5	6	7	8	Final
AP	—	—	9	5	8	7	6	7	5
