= 1949 William & Mary Indians football team =

American college football season

1949 William & Mary Indians football
- Conference: Southern Conference
- Record: 6–4 (4–2 SoCon)
- Head coach: Rube McCray (6th season)
- Captains: George Hughes; Jack Cloud
- Home stadium: Cary Field

1949 Southern Conference football standings
	Conf.					Overall
Team	W		L		T	W		L		T
No. 16 North Carolina $	5	–	0	–	0	7	–	4	–	0
No. 14 Maryland	4	–	0	–	0	9	–	1	–	0
Washington and Lee	3	–	1	–	1	3	–	5	–	1
Duke	4	–	2	–	0	6	–	3	–	0
William & Mary	4	–	2	–	0	6	–	4	–	0
VMI	3	–	2	–	1	3	–	5	–	1
The Citadel	2	–	2	–	0	4	–	5	–	0
Clemson	2	–	2	–	0	4	–	4	–	2
Furman	3	–	3	–	0	3	–	6	–	0
South Carolina	3	–	3	–	0	4	–	6	–	0
Wake Forest	3	–	3	–	0	4	–	6	–	0
George Washington	2	–	3	–	0	4	–	5	–	0
NC State	3	–	6	–	0	3	–	7	–	0
VPI	1	–	5	–	2	1	–	7	–	2
Richmond	2	–	6	–	0	3	–	7	–	0
Davidson	1	–	5	–	0	2	–	8	–	0
$ – Conference champion; Rankings from AP Poll

The 1949 William & Mary Indians football team represented the College of William & Mary in Williamsburg, Virginia during the 1949 college football season. The 1940s was the most successful decade in William & Mary football history. The Indians amassed more wins than any other decade (and this includes a non-existent 1943 season due to World War II), had the largest positive-point differential, won two conference championships and qualified for back-to-back bowl games in 1947 and 1948. There were 24 National Football League (NFL) Draft selections, which is the most all-time for William & Mary in a single decade. Additionally, the 1940s was the only decade in which William & Mary was an Associated Press nationally ranked team as a major college football team.

== Schedule ==
Date	Opponent	Site	Result	Attendance	Source
September 17	at Houston*	Public School Stadium; Houston, TX	W 14–13	20,000	
September 24	at Pittsburgh*	Pitt Stadium; Pittsburgh, PA	L 7–13	21,506	
October 1	VPI	Cary Field; Williamsburg, VA	W 39–13	10,000	
October 8	VMI^{†}	Cary Field; Williamsburg, VA (rivalry)	W 54–6	10,000	
October 15	at No. 19 Michigan State*	Macklin Stadium; East Lansing, MI	L 13–42	32,655	
October 22	at Wake Forest	Groves Stadium; Wake Forest, NC	L 28–55	12,000	
October 29	at Richmond	City Stadium; Richmond, VA (rivalry)	W 34–0	10,000	
November 5	North Carolina	Cary Field; Williamsburg, VA	L 14–20	21,000	
November 19	at Arkansas*	War Memorial Stadium; Little Rock, AR	W 20–0	16,000	
November 26	NC State	Cary Field; Williamsburg, VA	W 33–7	8,000	
*Non-conference game; ^{†}Homecoming; Rankings from AP Poll released prior to the game

== NFL draft selections ==
= Pro Football Hall of Fame	= Canadian Football Hall of Fame	= College Football Hall of Fame

NFL Draft Selections

#	Year	Round	Pick	Overall	Name	Team	Position
1	1950	3	7	34	George Hughes	Pittsburgh Steelers	Guard
2	1950	6	3	69	"Flyin'" Jack Cloud	Green Bay Packers	Back
3	1950	9	8	113	Vito Ragazzo	Chicago Cardinals	End
4	1950	10	12	130	Frank O'Pella	Cleveland Browns	Back
5	1950	24	4	304	Jim McDowell	Detroit Lions	Guard
