= 1949 George Washington Colonials football team =

American college football season

1949 George Washington Colonials football
- Conference: Southern Conference
- Record: 4–5 (2–3 SoCon)
- Head coach: Bo Rowland (2nd season)
- Home stadium: Griffith Stadium

1949 Southern Conference football standings
	Conf.					Overall
Team	W		L		T	W		L		T
No. 16 North Carolina $	5	–	0	–	0	7	–	4	–	0
No. 14 Maryland	4	–	0	–	0	9	–	1	–	0
Washington and Lee	3	–	1	–	1	3	–	5	–	1
Duke	4	–	2	–	0	6	–	3	–	0
William & Mary	4	–	2	–	0	6	–	4	–	0
VMI	3	–	2	–	1	3	–	5	–	1
The Citadel	2	–	2	–	0	4	–	5	–	0
Clemson	2	–	2	–	0	4	–	4	–	2
Furman	3	–	3	–	0	3	–	6	–	0
South Carolina	3	–	3	–	0	4	–	6	–	0
Wake Forest	3	–	3	–	0	4	–	6	–	0
George Washington	2	–	3	–	0	4	–	5	–	0
NC State	3	–	6	–	0	3	–	7	–	0
VPI	1	–	5	–	2	1	–	7	–	2
Richmond	2	–	6	–	0	3	–	7	–	0
Davidson	1	–	5	–	0	2	–	8	–	0
$ – Conference champion; Rankings from AP Poll

The 1949 George Washington Colonials football team was an American football team that represented George Washington University as part of the Southern Conference during the 1949 college football season. In their second season under head coach Bo Rowland, the team compiled a 4–5 record (2–3 in the SoCon).

== Schedule ==
Date	Opponent	Site	Result	Attendance	Source
September 24	at Virginia*	Scott Stadium; Charlottesville, VA	L 13–27	18,000	
October 1	at VMI	City Stadium; Lynchburg, VA	L 7–14		
October 8	at Kansas*	Memorial Stadium; Lawrence, KS	L 14–21	18,000	
October 15	at VPI	Miles Stadium; Blacksburg, VA	W 24–14	12,000	
October 21	Washington and Lee	Griffith Stadium; Washington, DC	W 21-19	13,657	
October 28	Lafayette*	Griffith Stadium; Washington, DC	W 14-7	3,954	
November 5	at Maryland	Byrd Stadium; College Park, MD	L 14–40		
November 12	Duke	Griffith Stadium; Washington, DC	L 0–35	9,283	
November 19	Georgetown*	Griffith Stadium; Washington, DC	W 28–7	12,546	
*Non-conference game
