= 1949 Texas A&M Aggies football team =

American college football season

1949 Texas A&M Aggies football
- Conference: Southwest Conference
- Record: 1–8–1 (0–5–1 SWC)
- Head coach: Harry Stiteler (2nd season)
- Home stadium: Kyle Field

1949 Southwest Conference football standings
	Conf.					Overall
Team	W		L		T	W		L		T
No. 5 Rice $	6	–	0	–	0	10	–	1	–	0
No. 20 Baylor	4	–	2	–	0	8	–	2	–	0
TCU	3	–	3	–	0	6	–	3	–	1
Texas	3	–	3	–	0	6	–	4	–	0
SMU	2	–	3	–	1	5	–	4	–	1
Arkansas	2	–	4	–	0	5	–	5	–	0
Texas A&M	0	–	5	–	1	1	–	8	–	1
$ – Conference champion; Rankings from AP Poll

The 1949 Texas A&M Aggies football team represented the Agricultural and Mechanical College of Texas—now known as Texas A&M University—in the Southwest Conference (SWC) during the 1949 college football season. In its second season under head coach Harry Stiteler, the team compiled an overall record of 1–8–1, with a mark of 0–5–1 in conference play, and finished seventh in the SWC.

== Schedule ==
Date	Opponent	Site	Result	Attendance	Source
September 17	Villanova*	Kyle Field; College Station, TX	L 0–35	29,000	
September 24	vs. Texas Tech*	Alamo Stadium; San Antonio, TX (rivalry)	W 26–7	19,740	
October 1	at Oklahoma*	Oklahoma Memorial Stadium; Norman, OK	L 13-33	32,000–34,658	
October 8	at LSU*	Tiger Stadium; Baton Rouge, LA (rivalry)	L 0–34	30,000	
October 15	at TCU	Amon G. Carter Stadium; Fort Worth, TX (rivalry)	L 6–28	30,000	
October 22	No. 11 Baylor	Kyle Field; College Station, TX (rivalry)	L 0–21		
October 29	at Arkansas	Razorback Stadium; Fayetteville, AR (rivalry)	L 6–27	20,000	
November 5	No. 9 SMU	Kyle Field; College Station, TX	T 27–27	31,000	
November 12	at No. 7 Rice	Rice Field; Houston, TX	L 0–13	31,000	
November 24	Texas	Kyle Field; College Station, TX (rivalry)	L 14–42	41,200	
*Non-conference game; Rankings from AP Poll released prior to the game
