= 1949 Duke Blue Devils football team =

American college football season

1949 Duke Blue Devils football
- Conference: Southern Conference
- Record: 6–3 (4–2 SoCon)
- Head coach: Wallace Wade (15th season)
- MVP: Lou Allen
- Captain: Lou Allen
- Home stadium: Duke Stadium

1949 Southern Conference football standings
	Conf.					Overall
Team	W		L		T	W		L		T
No. 16 North Carolina $	5	–	0	–	0	7	–	4	–	0
No. 14 Maryland	4	–	0	–	0	9	–	1	–	0
Washington and Lee	3	–	1	–	1	3	–	5	–	1
Duke	4	–	2	–	0	6	–	3	–	0
William & Mary	4	–	2	–	0	6	–	4	–	0
VMI	3	–	2	–	1	3	–	5	–	1
The Citadel	2	–	2	–	0	4	–	5	–	0
Clemson	2	–	2	–	0	4	–	4	–	2
Furman	3	–	3	–	0	3	–	6	–	0
South Carolina	3	–	3	–	0	4	–	6	–	0
Wake Forest	3	–	3	–	0	4	–	6	–	0
George Washington	2	–	3	–	0	4	–	5	–	0
NC State	3	–	6	–	0	3	–	7	–	0
VPI	1	–	5	–	2	1	–	7	–	2
Richmond	2	–	6	–	0	3	–	7	–	0
Davidson	1	–	5	–	0	2	–	8	–	0
$ – Conference champion; Rankings from AP Poll

The 1949 Duke Blue Devils football team was an American football team that represented Duke University as a member of the Southern Conference (SoCon) during the 1949 college football season. In their 15th year under head coach Wallace Wade, the Blue Devils compiled an overall record of 6–3, with a conference record of 4–2, and finished tied for fourth in the SoCon.

== Schedule ==
Date	Time	Opponent	Rank	Site	Result	Attendance	Source
September 24		Richmond		Duke Stadium; Durham, NC	W 67–0	12,000	
October 1		at Tennessee*		Shields–Watkins Field; Knoxville, TN	W 21–7	40,000	
October 8		at Navy*	No. 14	Thompson Stadium; Annapolis, MD	L 14–28	22,000	
October 15		NC State		Duke Stadium; Durham, NC (rivalry)	W 14–13	20,000	
October 22	2:00 p.m.	VPI^{†}		Duke Stadium; Durham, NC	W 55–7	10,000	
October 29		at Georgia Tech*		Grant Field; Atlanta, GA	W 27–14	38,000	
November 5		Wake Forest	No. 16	Duke Stadium; Durham, NC (rivalry)	L 7–27	35,000	
November 12		at George Washington		Griffith Stadium; Washington, DC	W 35–0	9,283	
November 19		North Carolina		Duke Stadium; Durham, NC (Victory Bell)	L 20–21	57,500	
*Non-conference game; ^{†}Homecoming; Rankings from AP Poll released prior to the game

== Rankings ==
Ranking movements Legend: ██ Increase in ranking ██ Decrease in ranking — = Not ranked ( ) = First-place votes
	Week								
Poll	1	2	3	4	5	6	7	8	Final
AP	14 (3)	—	—	—	16	—	—	—	—
