= 1949 TCU Horned Frogs football team =

American college football season

1949 TCU Horned Frogs football
- Conference: Southwest Conference
- Record: 6–3–1 (3–3 SWC)
- Head coach: Dutch Meyer (16th season)
- Offensive scheme: Meyer spread
- Home stadium: Amon G. Carter Stadium

1949 Southwest Conference football standings
	Conf.					Overall
Team	W		L		T	W		L		T
No. 5 Rice $	6	–	0	–	0	10	–	1	–	0
No. 20 Baylor	4	–	2	–	0	8	–	2	–	0
TCU	3	–	3	–	0	6	–	3	–	1
Texas	3	–	3	–	0	6	–	4	–	0
SMU	2	–	3	–	1	5	–	4	–	1
Arkansas	2	–	4	–	0	5	–	5	–	0
Texas A&M	0	–	5	–	1	1	–	8	–	1
$ – Conference champion; Rankings from AP Poll

The 1949 TCU Horned Frogs football team represented Texas Christian University (TCU) in the 1949 college football season. The Horned Frogs finished the season 6–3–1 overall and 3–3 in the Southwest Conference. The team was coached by Dutch Meyer in his sixteenth year as head coach. The Frogs played their home games in Amon G. Carter Stadium, which is located on campus in Fort Worth, Texas.

== Schedule ==
Date	Opponent	Site	Result	Attendance	Source
September 17	at Kansas*	Memorial Stadium; Lawrence, KS	W 28–0	32,000	
September 24	Oklahoma A&M*	Amon G. Carter Stadium; Fort Worth, TX	T 33–33	18,000	
October 1	at Arkansas	Razorback Stadium; Fayetteville, AR	L 7–27	16,000	
October 8	at Indiana*	Memorial Stadium; Bloomington, IN	W 13–6	20,000	
October 15	Texas A&M	Amon G. Carter Stadium; Fort Worth, TX (rivalry)	W 28–6	30,000	
October 22	Ole Miss*	Amon G. Carter Stadium; Fort Worth, TX	W 33–27		
October 29	at No. 10 Baylor	Municipal Stadium; Waco, TX (rivalry)	L 14–40	20,000	
November 12	at No. 13 Texas	Memorial Stadium; Austin, TX (rivalry)	W 14–13	40,000	
November 19	No. 6 Rice	Amon G. Carter Stadium; Fort Worth, TX	L 14–20		
November 26	SMU	Amon G. Carter Stadium; Fort Worth, TX (rivalry)	W 21–13	33,000	
*Non-conference game; Rankings from AP Poll released prior to the game

== After the season ==
The following Horned Frogs were selected in the 1950 NFL draft after the season.

Round	Pick	Player	Position	NFL team
4	49	Morris Bailey	End	San Francisco 49ers
7	81	Don Narrell	Tackle	New York Bulldogs
7	89	Lindy Berry	Back	San Francisco 49ers
8	94	Jack Archer	Back	New York Bulldogs
11	133	Roger McAuley	Guard	Boston Yanks
27	350	Hal Kilman	Tackle	Los Angeles Rams
