= 1949 Texas Longhorns football team =

American college football season

1949 Texas Longhorns football
- Conference: Southwest Conference
- Record: 6–4 (3–3 SWC)
- Head coach: Blair Cherry (3rd season)
- Home stadium: Memorial Stadium

1949 Southwest Conference football standings
	Conf.					Overall
Team	W		L		T	W		L		T
No. 5 Rice $	6	–	0	–	0	10	–	1	–	0
No. 20 Baylor	4	–	2	–	0	8	–	2	–	0
TCU	3	–	3	–	0	6	–	3	–	1
Texas	3	–	3	–	0	6	–	4	–	0
SMU	2	–	3	–	1	5	–	4	–	1
Arkansas	2	–	4	–	0	5	–	5	–	0
Texas A&M	0	–	5	–	1	1	–	8	–	1
$ – Conference champion; Rankings from AP Poll

The 1949 Texas Longhorns football team was an American football team that represented the University of Texas (now known as the University of Texas at Austin) as a member of the Southwest Conference (SWC) during the 1949 college football season. In their third year under head coach Blair Cherry, the Longhorns compiled an overall record of 6–4, with a mark of 3–3 in conference play, and finished tied for third in the SWC.

== Schedule ==
Date	Opponent	Rank	Site	Result	Attendance	Source
September 17	Texas Tech*		Memorial Stadium; Austin, TX (rivalry)	W 43–0	28,000	
September 24	at Temple*		Temple Stadium; Philadelphia, PA	W 54–0	12,000	
October 1	Idaho*		Memorial Stadium; Austin, TX	W 56–7		
October 8	vs. No. 3 Oklahoma*	No. 12	Cotton Bowl; Dallas, TX (rivalry)	L 14–20	75,347	
October 15	at Arkansas	No. 16	War Memorial Stadium; Little Rock, AR (rivalry)	W 27–14	30,000	
October 22	No. 9 Rice	No. 10	Memorial Stadium; Austin, TX (rivalry)	L 15–17	60,000	
October 29	at No. 11 SMU	No. 19	Cotton Bowl; Dallas, TX	L 6–7	75,000	
November 5	No. 6 Baylor		Memorial Stadium; Austin, TX (rivalry)	W 20–0	60,000	
November 12	TCU	No. 13	Memorial Stadium; Austin, TX (rivalry)	L 13–14	40,000	
November 24	at Texas A&M		Kyle Field; College Station, TX (rivalry)	W 42–14	41,200	
*Non-conference game; Rankings from AP Poll released prior to the game

== Rankings ==
Ranking movements Legend: ██ Increase in ranking ██ Decrease in ranking — = Not ranked
	Week								
Poll	1	2	3	4	5	6	7	8	Final
AP	12	16	10	19	—	13	—	—	—
