= 1937 Wiley Wildcats football team =

American college football season

1937 Wiley Wildcats football
- Conference: Southwestern Athletic Conference
- Record: 5–5–1 (2–3–1 SWAC)
- Head coach: Fred T. Long (15th season)
- Home stadium: Fair Park Stadium

1937 Southwestern Athletic Conference football standings
	Conf.					Overall
Team	W		L		T	W		L		T
Texas College $	5	–	0	–	1	8	–	0	–	1
Arkansas AM&N	3	–	0	–	3	7	–	0	–	3
Prairie View	4	–	2	–	0	7	–	4	–	0
Langston	3	–	3	–	0	3	–	4	–	1
Wiley	2	–	3	–	1	5	–	5	–	1
Southern	1	–	4	–	1	4	–	4	–	1
Bishop	0	–	6	–	0	1	–	6	–	1
$ – Conference champion

The 1937 Wiley Wildcats football team represented Wiley College as a member of the Southwestern Athletic Conference (SWAC) during the 1937 college football season. Led by 15th-year head coach Fred T. Long, the Wildcats compiled an overall record of 5–5–1, with a conference record of 2–3–1, and finished fifth in the SWAC.

== Schedule ==
Date	Opponent	Site	Result	Attendance	Source
September 25	vs. Jarvis*	Lobo Stadium; Longview, TX	W 20–0		
October 1	Samuel Huston*	Fair Park Stadium; Marshall, TX	W 57–0		
October 9	at Xavier (LA)*	Xavier Stadium; New Orleans, LA	L 3–13	2,500	
October 18	vs. Prairie View	Cotton Bowl; Dallas, TX (State Fair Classic (TX))	L 0–13	10,000	
October 30	at Arkansas AM&N	Athletic Field; Pine Bluff, AR	T 13–13		
November 1	vs. Southern	State Fair Stadium; Shreveport, LA (State Fair Classic (LA))	W 7–0	5,000	
November 6	at Bishop	Fair Park Stadium; Marshall, TX	W 13–12	4,000	
November 13	at Langston	Anderson Field; Langston, OK	L 0–7	4,000	
November 25	Texas College	Fair Park Stadium; Marshall, TX	L 0–12		
December 4	at Philander Smith*	Little Rock, TX	W 26–7		
December 11	Tuskegee*^{†}	Fair Park Stadium; Marshall, TX	L 0–6		
*Non-conference game; ^{†}Homecoming
