= Bob Margarita =

American football player and coach (1920–2008)

No. 44, 33
- Position: Halfback

Personal information
- Born: November 3, 1920; Boston, Massachusetts, U.S.
- Died: July 28, 2008 (aged 87); Stoneham, Massachusetts, U.S.
- Listed height: 5 ft 11 in (1.80 m)
- Listed weight: 178 lb (81 kg)

Career information
- High school: Medford (Medford, Massachusetts)
- College: Brown (1940-1942)
- NFL draft: 1944: 21st round, 216th overall pick

Career history
- Chicago Bears (1944–1946)

Awards and highlights
- NFL champion (1946)

Career NFL statistics
- Rushing yards: 960
- Rushing average: 4.7
- Receptions: 38
- Receiving yards: 524
- Total touchdowns: 9
- Stats at Pro Football Reference

Head coaching record
- Career: 7–12 (.368)

Henry Robert Margarita (November 3, 1920 – July 28, 2008) was an American professional football halfback and coach. He was a two-time honorable mention All-American at Brown University, once rushing for 233 yards against Columbia, the fourth-highest single-game rushing total in school history. Margarita played for the Chicago Bears from 1944 to 1946, leading the team in rushing in 1945. Following his playing career, he took the head coaching job at Georgetown University, compiling a 7–12 record in two seasons (1949–1950) and leading the Hoyas to the Sun Bowl in his first season. After a disappointing 2–7 record in his second season, the university decided to disband the football team, citing travel expenses and high rent at Griffith Stadium. Margarita was the last Hoya football coach until 1964, when the sport was revived at the club level. Margarita is a member of the Medford (MA) Athletic Hall of Fame, the Brown University Hall of Fame, the Massachusetts High School Football Coaches Hall of Fame and the Stoneham High School Hall of Fame.

== Head coaching record ==
Year	Team	Overall	Conference	Standing	Bowl/playoffs
Georgetown Hoyas (Independent) (1949–1950)
1949	Georgetown	5–5			L Sun
1950	Georgetown	2–7			
Georgetown:		7–12			
Total:		7–12			
