= Max Reed (American football) =

American football player and coach (1902–1973)

No. 2, 19, 17
- Position: Center

Personal information
- Born: February 15, 1902; Lewisburg, Pennsylvania, U.S.
- Died: June 27, 1973 (aged 71); Lewisburg, Pennsylvania, U.S.
- Listed height: 5 ft 8 in (1.73 m)
- Listed weight: 185 lb (84 kg)

Career information
- High school: Lewisburg (PA)
- College: Bucknell

Career history

Playing
- Buffalo Bisons (1925); Frankford Yellow Jackets (1926-1927); New York Giants (1928)

Coaching
- Washington Redskins (1950) Line Coach

Awards and highlights
- 1926 NFL champion
- Stats at Pro Football Reference

John Maxwell Reed (February 15, 1902 - June 27, 1973) was an American football center who played 35 games, for the Buffalo Bisons, Frankford Yellow Jackets, and New York Giants. He scored one touchdown in his career. He was the Washington Redskins Line Coach in 1950.
