= Mel Whedbee =

American football coach (1904–1974)

Mel F. Whedbee

Biographical details
- Born: February 14, 1904; Louisville, Kentucky, U.S.
- Died: July 11, 1974 (aged 70); Topeka, Kansas, U.S.

Playing career
- 1941: Fisk
- Position: Quarterback

Coaching career (HC unless noted)
- 1959–1961: Kentucky State (assistant)
- 1961–1966: Kentucky State

Head coaching record
- Overall: 26–20–1

Melville F. Whedbee (February 14, 1904 – July 11, 1974) was an American college football player and coach. He served as the head football coach at Kentucky State University in Frankfort, Kentucky from 1961 to 1966. Whedbee joined the coaching staff at Kentucky State in 1959 as an assistant under Sam B. Taylor. He took over as head coach for an ailing Taylor midway through the 1961 season. Whedbee was succeeded as head football coach by Charles Bates in 1967, but remained as an instructor in the physical education department at Kentucky State.

Whedbee died on July 11, 1974, in Topeka, Kansas.

== Head coaching record ==
Year	Team	Overall	Conference	Standing	Bowl/playoffs
Kentucky State (Midwest Athletic Association / Midwest Conference / Midwestern Conference) (1961–1966)
1961	Kentucky State	3–1 (Note: Sam B. Taylor served as Kentucky State's head coach for the first five games of the 1961 season before ailing health forced him to hand control over the team over to Whedbee. The Thorobreds finished the season with an overall record of 6–3 and a mark of 1–2 in conference play.)	1–1	3rd	
1962	Kentucky State	4–4	0–3	4th	
1963	Kentucky State	5–4	1–2	3rd	
1964	Kentucky State	7–3	1–2	3rd	
1965	Kentucky State	4–4	0–3	4th	
1966	Kentucky State	3–4–1	0–2	3rd	
Kentucky State:		26–20–1	3–13		
Total:		26–20–1			
