= Marinus Kregel =

American sports coach and administrator (1911–1996)

Biographical details
- Born: February 18, 1911; Chicago, Illinois, U.S.
- Died: September 6, 1996 (aged 85); Americus, Georgia, U.S.

Playing career

Football
- 1932–1933: Central (IA)

Basketball
- 1930–1934: Central (IA)

Baseball
- c. 1932–1934: Central (IA)

Track
- 1930–1934: Central (IA)
- Position: Quarterback (football)

Coaching career (HC unless noted)

Football
- 1937–1943: Mission House
- 1946–1950: Mission House

Basketball
- 1937–1943: Mission House
- 1946–1951: Mission House
- 1951–1965: Central (IA)
- 1965–1978: Georgia Southwestern State

Baseball
- 1951–1958: Central (IA)

Administrative career (AD unless noted)
- 1965–1978: Georgia Southwestern State

Head coaching record
- Overall: 40–32–2 (football); 292–233 (basketball)

Accomplishments and honors

Championships
- Football; 4 BSIC/Badger-Illini (1940–1941, 1947, 1950)

Marinus John Kregel (February 18, 1911 – September 6, 1996) was an American football, basketball, baseball, and track coach and college athletics administrator. He served as the head football coach at Mission House College—now known as Lakeland University—in Plymouth, Wisconsin from 1937 to 1942 and again from 1946 to 1950, compiling a record of 40–32–2. Kregel was also the head basketball coach at Mission House from 1937 to 1943 and again from 1946 to 1951, Central College in Pella, Iowa from 1951 to 1965, and Georgia Southwestern State University in Americus, Georgia from 1965 to 1978.

Kregel attended La Crosse State Teachers College—now known as University of Wisconsin–La Crosse—before transferring to Central College. At Central, he won four varsity letters in basketball and track, three in baseball, and two in football. In the football team, he was the regular quarterback for two seasons. Kregel graduated from Central in 1934 with a Bachelor of Arts degree in biology and physical education.

Kregel dies on September 6, 1996, at his home in Americus.

== Head coaching record ==
=== College ===
Year	Team	Overall	Conference	Standing	Bowl/playoffs
Mission House Muskies (Tri-State Intercollegiate Conference / Badger State Conference) (1937–1942)
1937	Mission House	2–4	1–3	T–3rd	
1938	Mission House	3–4	2–3		
1939	Mission House	3–2–1	1–2–1	4th	
1940	Mission House	4–3	3–1	T–1st	
1941	Mission House	5–2	3–1	T–1st	
1942	Mission House	1–5	1–3	4th	
Mission House Muskies (Badger State Conference / Badger-Illini Conference) (1946–1950)
1946	Mission House	3–3	2–2	3rd	
1947	Mission House	6–2	3–1	T–1st	
1948	Mission House	3–4–1	3–3–1	4th	
1949	Mission House	4–3	4–2	4th	
1950	Mission House	6–0	6–0	1st	
Mission House:		40–32–2	29–21–2		
Total:		40–32–2			
National championship Conference title Conference division title or championship game berth
