= 1950 Mission House Muskies football team =

American college football season

1950 Mission House Muskies football
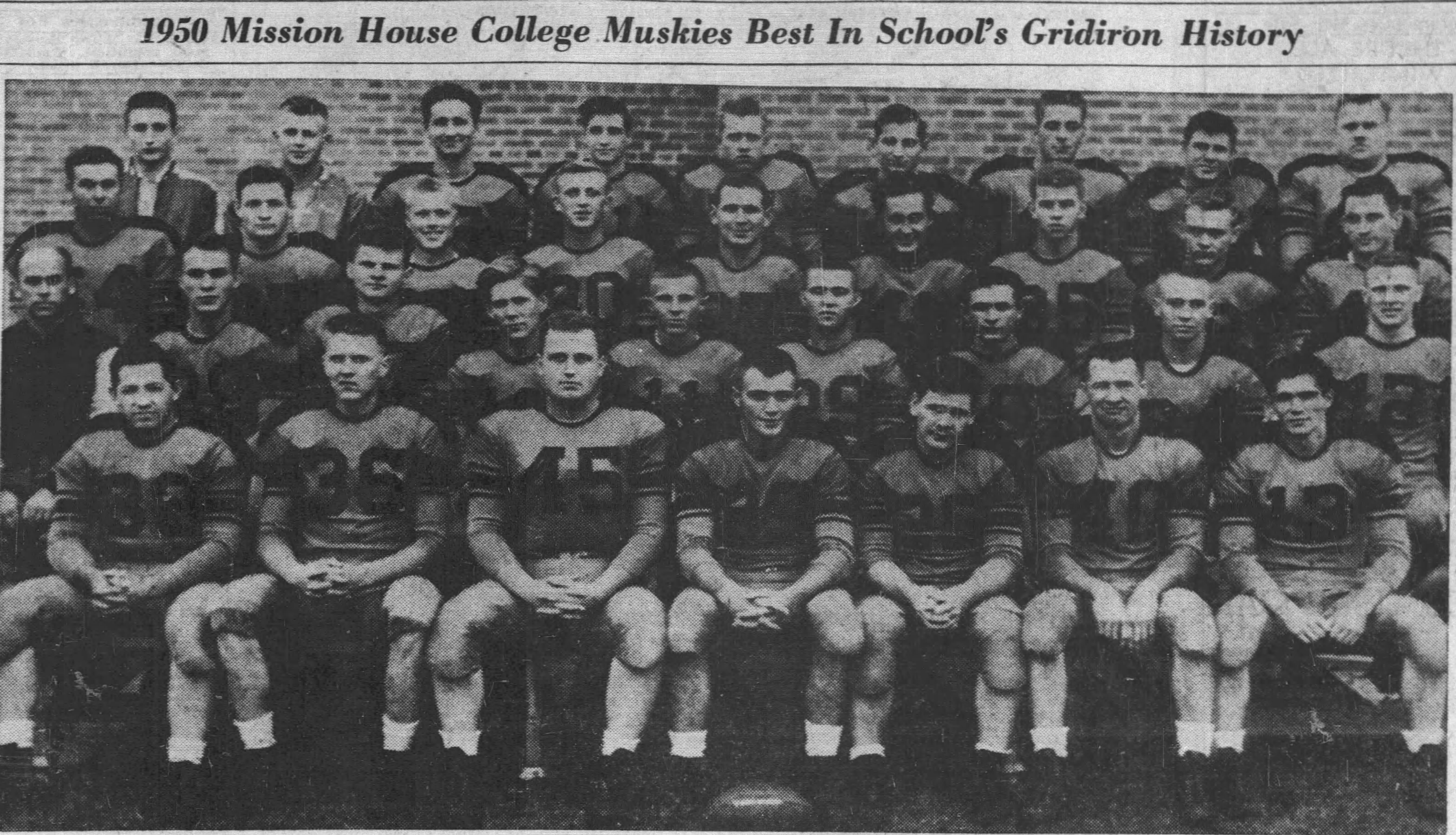

BIC champion
- Conference: Badger-Illini Conference
- Record: 6–0 (6–0 BIC)
- Head coach: Marinus Kregel (11th season)
- Captain: Louie Pluim
- Home stadium: Mission House Athletic Field

1950 Badger-Illini Conference football standings
	Conf.					Overall
Team	W		L		T	W		L		T
Mission House $	6	–	0	–	0	6	–	0	–	0
Northwestern (WI)	5	–	1	–	0	5	–	1	–	0
Wisconsin–Extension	4	–	1	–	1	4	–	1	–	1
Milton	2	–	3	–	1	2	–	3	–	2
Concordia (IL)	1	–	3	–	1	2	–	4	–	1
St. Procopius	2	–	5	–	0	2	–	5	–	0
Wisconsin Tech	1	–	4	–	1	1	–	5	–	1
Aurora	1	–	5	–	0	1	–	6	–	0
$ – Conference champion

The 1950 Mission House Muskies football team was an American football team that represented Mission House College (now known as Lakeland University) as a member of the Badger-Illini Conference (BIC) during the 1950 college football season. In their 11th and final season under head coach Marinus Kregel, the team compiled a perfect 6–0 record, won the BIC championship, shut out its first four opponents, and outscored all opponents by a total of 97 to 21. The Muskies won prior conference championships in 1940, 1941, and 1947, but the 1950 team compiled the first perfect season in the history of the school's football program.

The highlight of the season was a 20–14 victory over the Northwestern Trojans. Both teams were undefeated at the time, and the game was played during Mission House's homecoming weekend.

The Muskies totaled 1,431 yards of total offense (871 rushing yards, 560 passing yards) while holding opponents to 643 yards.

The team's leading scorers were team captain Louie Pluim with 25 points, freshman end John Resnick with 24 points; and Dick Gerber with 20 points. Gerber was the leading rusher with 336 yards on 67 carries (five yards per carry) and the leading punter with an average of 44.5 yards per punt. Resnick was the leading receiver with two catches for 21 catches for 268 yards.

The team played its home games at the Mission College Athletic Field in Plymouth, Wisconsin.

== Schedule ==
Date	Opponent	Site	Result	Source
September 22	St. Procopius	Mission House Athletic Field; Plymouth, WI	W 7–0	
September 30	at Milton	Kiel, WI	W 6–0	
October 7	at Aurora	Aurora, IL	W 34–0	
October 14	Wisconsin–Extension	Mission House Athletic Field; Plymouth, WI	W 18–0	
October 21	Northwestern (WI)^{†}	Mission House Athletic Field; Plymouth, WI	W 20–14	
October 27	at Wisconsin Tech	Platteville, WI	W 12–7	
^{†}Homecoming
