= Kregel =

Kregel is a surname. Notable people with the surname include:

- Jan Kregel (born 1944), post-Keynesian economist
- Kevin R. Kregel (born 1956), American astronaut
- Marinus Kregel (1911–1996), American football and college basketball coach

== See also ==
- Kregel Publications, Evangelical Christian book publisher based in Grand Rapids, Michigan
- Kregel Windmill Museum, Agriculture museums in the United States
