= Dave Kraayeveld =

American football player (born 1955)

No. 70
- Position: Defensive end

Personal information
- Born: October 26, 1955 (age 71); Elkhorn, Wisconsin, U.S.
- Listed height: 6 ft 5 in (1.96 m)
- Listed weight: 255 lb (116 kg)

Career information
- High school: Delavan-Darien (Delavan, Wisconsin)
- College: Milton; Wisconsin–Whitewater
- NFL draft: 1978: undrafted

Career history
- Dallas Cowboys (1978)*; Seattle Seahawks (1978); Green Bay Packers (1979)*
- * Offseason or practice squad member only

Career NFL statistics
- Games played: 12
- Stats at Pro Football Reference

David Ray Kraayeveld (born October 26, 1955) is an American former professional football player who was a defensive end in the National Football League (NFL) for the Seattle Seahawks. He played college football for the Milton Wildcats and Wisconsin–Whitewater Warhawks.

== Early life ==
Kraayeveld was born on October 26, 1955, in Elkhorn, Wisconsin. He attended Delavan-Darien High School, where he practiced football, basketball and track.

He played football for three years at the University of Wisconsin–Whitewater.

Kraayeveld transferred to the now-defunct Milton College, where he played football as a senior. He was a starter at offensive tackle and long snapper, while receiving All-conference honors. He returned a fumble recovery for a 60-yard touchdown against Lakeland College.

His coach Rudy Gaddini, suggested Gil Brandt of the Dallas Cowboys take a look at Kraayeveld. Dallas scouts tested and entered him into their rookie camp for workouts. He and Dave Krieg, who also played for the Seahawks, are the only two people to have attended Milton College and played in the NFL.

== Professional career ==
=== Dallas Cowboys ===
Kraayeveld was signed as an undrafted free agent by the Dallas Cowboys after the 1978 NFL draft. He was converted into a defensive end during training camp. He returned an interception for a 61-yard touchdown in the first preseason game against the San Francisco 49ers. He was waived before the start of the season on August 28.

=== Seattle Seahawks ===
In September 1978, he was signed as a free agent by the Seattle Seahawks. He was released on November 8. He was re-signed on November 15. As a rookie, he played in 12 games as a core special teamer.

In 1979, he was tried at the offensive guard and center during training camp. On August 6, he was released before the start of the season.

=== Green Bay Packers ===
On August 12, 1979, he was signed by the Green Bay Packers as a free agent. On August 16, he was released before the start of the season.

== 12th Man ==
On October 29, 1978, when the Denver Broncos missed a key field goal, a referee flagged the Seahawks for having a 12th man on the field. Kraayeveld made the mistake of being the 12th man, due in part to the Dallas Cowboy's policy of using the same defense on field goals as the previous down. The Broncos made the second attempt to win the game 20–17.

== Personal life ==
His daughter Cathrine, played power forward in the WNBA. He is a joint owner with his wife, Cynthia, and his daughter, of a condominium in Bellevue, Washington.
