= 1949 Lewis Flyers football team =

American college football season

1949 Lewis Flyers football

Badger-Illini champion
- Conference: Badger-Illini Conference
- Record: 9–0 (6–0 Badger-Illini)
- Head coach: Ray McLean (2nd season)
- Offensive scheme: T formation

1949 Badger-Illini Conference football standings
	Conf.					Overall
Team	W		L		T	W		L		T
Lewis $	6	–	0	–	0	9	–	0	–	0
Milton	6	–	1	–	0	6	–	2	–	0
Concordia (IL)	5	–	1	–	0	6	–	1	–	0
Mission House	4	–	2	–	0	4	–	3	–	0
Northwestern (WI)	3	–	4	–	0	3	–	4	–	0
Wisconsin Tech	2	–	3	–	0	2	–	4	–	0
Aurora	2	–	5	–	0	2	–	5	–	0
St. Procopius	0	–	6	–	1	0	–	6	–	1
Wisconsin–Extension	0	–	6	–	1	0	–	6	–	1
$ – Conference champion

The 1949 Lewis Flyers football team represented Lewis College—now known as Lewis University—of Lockport, Illinois, as a member of the Badger-Illini Conference during the 1949 college football season. Led by second-year head coach Ray McLean, the Flyers compiled a perfect 9–0 record (6–0 in conference games), won the Badger-Illini championship, shut out six opponents, and outscored all opponents by a total of 310 to 15.

Lewis employed a T formation on offense. Coach McLean played halfback for the Chicago Bears from 1940 to 1947, winning four NFL championships, and used the Bears' playbook while coaching at Lewis. McLean boasted to the press that his players were "so well versed in the Chicago Bears' plays that they could step into the Bears' lineup and run them off without trouble." McLean later became head coach of the Green Bay Packers.

Key players on the 1949 Lewis team included fullbacks Bill Stratton and Bob Giesey, halfback Chico Mavigliano, quarterback Larry O'Shea, and Marvin Prate who was described in the Chicago Tribune as "not too fast but a tricky runner."

Lewis in 1949 was a two-year college with less than 150 students. The team was touted as a candidate to play in the 1949 Little Rose Bowl. In the end, Little Rock received the bid over Lewis. In late November 1949, Lewis withdrew from the Badger-Illini Conference after dropping plans to expand into a four-year college, a requirement for continued membership in the conference. Because of the school's withdrawal from the conference, no Lewis players were included on the 1949 all-conference team.

== Schedule ==
Date	Time	Opponent	Site	Result	Source
September 15		LaSalle-Peru Junior College*	Romeoville, IL	W 28–8	
September 23		Morgan Park Junior College*	Romeoville, IL	W 54–0	
October 1		at Northwestern (WI)	Watertown, WI	W 21–7	
October 8		Concordia (IL)	Romeoville, IL	W 44–0	
October 15	2:00 p.m.	Wisconsin Tech	Legion Memorial Field; Platteville, WI	W 30–0	
October 21		Great Lakes Hospital*		W 53–0	
October 29		at Aurora	Aurora, IL	W 47–0	
November 3		Mission House	Romeoville, IL	W 33–0	
November 12		St. Procopius	Baldwin City, KS	W (forfeit)	
*Non-conference game; All times are in Central time
