= 1949 college football season =

American college football season

- First AP No. 1 of season: Michigan
- Number of bowls: 9
- Champion: Notre Dame (AP)
- Heisman: Leon Hart (end, Notre Dame)

The 1949 college football season was the 81st season of intercollegiate football in the United States. It concluded with the top four teams undefeated and untied at the end of the regular season:

- Notre Dame compiled a perfect 10–0 record, outscored opponents by a total of 360 to 86, and was the consensus national champion, receiving 172 of 208 first-place votes in the final Associated Press (AP) poll. The Irish led the country in total offense with an average of 434.8 yards per game. Key players included end Leon Hart (winner of the 1949 Heisman Trophy and Maxwell Award); halfback Emil Sitko (712 rushing yards and a consensus All-American); and quarterback Bob Williams (led the country with an average of 159.1 passing yards per game).
- Oklahoma compiled an 11–0 record, won the Big 7 championship, and defeated LSU in the 1950 Sugar Bowl. The Sooners were ranked No. 2 in the final AP poll and were recognized as national champion by the Billingsley Report and College Football Researchers Association. The Sooners led the country in rushing defense, giving up an average of only 55.6 rushing yards per game. Head coach Bud Wilkinson won the Coach of the Year Award by the American Football Coaches Association. Darrell Royal was the team's starting quarterback.
- California (10–1) won the Pacific Coast Conference championship, went undefeated in the regular season, and was ranked No. 3 in the AP poll. The Bears lost to Ohio State in the 1950 Rose Bowl. Guard Rod Franz was a first-team All-American for three consecutive years from 1947 to 1949.
- Army went 9–0, outscored opponents by a total of 354 to 89, and won the Lambert-Meadowlands Trophy as the best college team in the East. Army defeated No. 1 Michigan on October 8 and jumped to the No. 2 spot in the following poll. The Cadets ended their season ranked No. 4 in the final AP poll. Quarterback Arnold Galiffa completed 50 of 95 passes for 887 yards and was a consensus All-American.

Other notable teams with undefeated records included Pacific (11–0, AP No. 10) and Oregon College of Education (9–0). Morgan State (8–0) and Southern (10–0–1) were each recognized as black college national champion by at least one selector.

The major college individual statistical leaders for 1949 included Drake fullback Johnny Bright with 1,950 yards of total offense; Ole Miss fullback Kayo Dottley with 1,312 rushing yards; North Carolina end Art Weiner with 52 pass receptions; and Oklahoma halfback George Thomas with 114 points scored.

== Conference and program changes ==
=== Conference changes ===
- Two new conferences began play in 1949:
  - Gulf Coast Conference: active through the 1956 season; formed by former members of the Lone Star Conference
  - Upper Peninsula Conference: football active through the 1950 season; formed by junior colleges and independents in the Upper Peninsula, Michigan and northern Wisconsin

=== Membership changes ===
Team	1948 conference	1949 conference
Detroit	Independent	Missouri Valley Conference
Louisville	Ohio Valley Conference	Independent
Marshall	Independent	Ohio Valley Conference
Pacific (CA)	California Collegiate Athletic Association	Independent
Tennessee Tech	Independent	Ohio Valley Conference

== Season chronology ==
=== September ===
The Associated Press did not poll the writers until the third week of the season. Among the five teams that had been ranked highest in 1948, California was the first to open play, with a 21–7 win over Santa Clara on September 17.

By September 24, most teams were in action. Defending champion Michigan beat visiting Michigan State, 7–3. Notre Dame beat Indiana 49–6. North Carolina beat N.C. State 26–6. California beat St. Mary's 29–7. The night before, Oklahoma had won at Boston College, 46–0.

=== October ===
On October 1 in Seattle, Notre Dame beat Washington 27–7. Oklahoma beat Texas A&M 33–13, North Carolina beat Georgia 21–14, and Michigan won at Stanford, 27–7. When the first poll was issued, Michigan had 34 of the 80 votes cast, followed by Notre Dame and Oklahoma. Tulane University, which had beaten Alabama 28–14 and Georgia Tech 18–0, placed fourth. Minnesota, which had victories over Washington (48–20) and at Nebraska (28–6) was fifth. North Carolina, which had been in the final top five in 1948, was at sixth place.

October 8 No. 1 Michigan was beaten at home by No. 7 Army. No. 2 Notre Dame won at Purdue 35–12. No. 3 Oklahoma beat No. 12 Texas in Dallas, 20–14. No. 4 Tulane beat Southeastern Louisiana 40–0. No. 5 Minnesota beat No. 20 Northwestern 21–7. The next poll elevated Notre Dame to No. 1 and Army to No. 2, followed by Oklahoma, Tulane, and Minnesota.

October 15 In South Bend, No. 1 Notre Dame beat No. 4 Tulane 46–7. No. 2 Army won at Harvard, 54–14. No. 3 Oklahoma beat Kansas 48–26. No. 5 Minnesota stayed unbeaten with a win in Columbus over No. 11 Ohio State, 27–0. The next poll featured No. 1 Notre Dame, No. 2 Army, No. 3 Minnesota, and No. 4 Oklahoma. California, which beat No. 12 USC 16–10, moved up from No. 9 to No. 5.

October 22 No. 1 Notre Dame was idle. No. 2 Army beat Columbia 63–6. No. 3 Minnesota lost at No. 12 Michigan, 14–7. No. 4 Oklahoma won at Nebraska 48–0. No. 5 California beat Washington 21–7. No. 9 Rice won at No. 10 Texas, 17–15, and was fifth in the next poll behind Notre Dame, Army, Oklahoma, and California.

October 29 In Baltimore, No. 1 Notre Dame defeated Navy, 40–0. No. 2 Army defeated VMI (the Virginia Military Institute) 40–14. No. 3 Oklahoma beat Iowa State 34–7. In Los Angeles, No. 4 California beat No. 20 UCLA 35–21. No. 5 Rice beat Texas Tech 28–0 to extend its record to 5–1–0. No. 6 Michigan, which won at Illinois 13–0, returned to the Top Five with a 4–2–0 record, moving up ahead of Rice.

=== November ===
November 5 No. 1 Notre Dame won at No. 10 Michigan State, 34–21. No. 2 Army defeated No. 20 Fordham, 35–0. No. 3 Oklahoma won at Kansas State 39–0. No. 4 California beat Washington State 33–14. No. 5 Michigan beat Purdue 20–12. The top five stayed unchanged.

November 12 At Yankee Stadium, No. 1 Notre Dame beat North Carolina, 42–6. No. 2 Army had a scare in Philadelphia, edging Penn 14–13. No. 3 Oklahoma won at Missouri, 27–7. No. 4 California beat Oregon 41–14. No. 5 Michigan beat Indiana 20–7. The next poll moved Oklahoma to No. 2 and California to No. 3, with Army dropping to fourth.

November 19 No. 1 Notre Dame defeated Iowa 28–7. No. 2 Oklahoma beat Santa Clara 28–21. No. 3 California defeated No. 12 Stanford 33–14 to finish its season unbeaten. No. 4 Army was idle as it prepared for the Army–Navy Game. No. 5 Michigan was tied by No. 7 Ohio State, 7–7. The next Top Five was No. 1 Notre Dame, No. 2 California, No. 3 Oklahoma, No. 4 Army, and No. 5 Ohio State.

November 26 No. 1 Notre Dame defeated visiting No. 17 USC, 32–0. No. 3 Oklahoma beat Oklahoma State 41–0. No. 4 Army returned to Philadelphia for the Army–Navy Game and defeated Navy 38–0. No. 7 Rice beat No. 9 Baylor 21-7. No. 2 California at 10–0–0, and No. 5 Ohio State, at 6–1–2, accepted bids to play in the Rose Bowl.

The final poll was released on November 28, although some colleges had not completed their schedules; the top five were No. 1 Notre Dame, No. 2 Oklahoma, No. 3 California, No. 4 Army, and No. 5 Rice. On December 3, the national champs, No. 1 Notre Dame closed a perfect season in Dallas with a 27–20 win over Southern Methodist University (SMU).

== Minor conference summaries ==
Conference	Champion(s)	Conference record	Overall record	Head coach
Alabama Intercollegiate Conference	Livingston State; Troy State	3–0–1; 2–0–1	7–2–1; 6–3–1	George Darrow, Vaughn Mancha; Fred McCollum
Badger-Illini Conference	Lewis	6–0	9–0	Ray McLean
California Collegiate Athletic Association	San Jose State	4–0	9–4	Wilbur V. Hubbard
Central Intercollegiate Conference	Pittsburg State; Washburn	5–1; 5–1	8–2–1; 7–2	Carnie Smith; Dick Godlove
College Conference of Illinois	Augustana (IL); Wheaton (IL)	5–0; 5–0	6–2; 8–2	Butch Stolfa; Harvey Chrouser
Colored Intercollegiate Athletic Association	Morgan State	7–0	8–0	Edward P. Hurt
Dixie Conference	Florida State	9–1	4–0	Don Veller
Eastern Intercollegiate Athletic Conference	Norfolk State	6–0	5–0	Leroy Porter
Evergreen Conference	Eastern Washington; Puget Sound	5–1; 5–1	7–2; 7–1	Abe Poffenroth; John P. Heinrick
Far Western Conference	Cal Aggies	4–0	5–4	Ted Forbes
Gulf Coast Conference	Hardin	3–0	10–1	Billy Stamps
Gulf States Conference	Louisiana Tech	5–0	7–2	Joe Aillet
Hoosier Conference	Hanover	6–0	8–1	Garland Frazier
Illinois Intercollegiate Athletic Conference	Western Illinois	4–0	9–1	Vince DiFrancesca
Iowa Conference	Simpson	6–0	8–1	Raburn G. Miller
Kansas Collegiate Athletic Conference	Baker	5–1	7–2	Karl Spear
Lone Star Conference	East Texas State	3–0	5–3–1	Bob Berr
Mason–Dixon Conference	Western Maryland	3–0	7–1	Charlie Havens
Michigan Intercollegiate Athletic Association	Hillsdale	5–0	9–1	Jack Petoskey
Mid-American Conference	Cincinnati	4–0	7–4	Sid Gillman
Mid-Ohio League	Findlay	4–0	5–3	Jack Henning
Midlands Conference	St. Ambrose	3–0	8–0	Larry Mullins
Midwest Athletic Association	Tennessee A&I	4–0	9–1	Henry Kean
Midwest Conference	Lawrence	6–0	7–1	Bernie Heselton
Minnesota Intercollegiate Athletic Conference	St. Thomas (MN)	6–0	6–2	Frank Deig
Minnesota Teachers College Conference	Mankato State	3–1	4–3–1	Earl Myers
Missouri College Athletic Union	Missouri Valley	3–0	8–3	Volney Ashford
Missouri Intercollegiate Athletic Association	Missouri Mines	5–0	6–2	Gale Bullman
Nebraska College Conference	Wayne State (NE)	8–0	9–0	Jack Wink
New Mexico Intercollegiate Conference	Sul Ross	5–0	7–3	Paul Pierce
North Central Conference	Iowa State Teachers; South Dakota State	5–1; 5–1	5–2; 7–3	Clyde Starbeck; Ralph Ginn
North Dakota Intercollegiate Conference	Valley City State	5–0	8–1	Bill Richter
North State Conference	Western Carolina	4–0	8–3	Tom Young
Northwest Conference	College of Idaho; Lewis & Clark; Pacific (OR)	4–1; 4–1; 4–1	6–2; 6–3; 8–1–1	Clem Parberry; Joe Huston; Paul Stagg
Ohio Athletic Conference	Muskingum	7–0	8–1	Ed Sherman
Ohio Valley Conference	Evansville	3–1–1	8–2–1	Don Ping
Oklahoma Collegiate Conference	Central State (OK)	5–0	7–2	Dale E. Hamilton
Pennsylvania State Teachers College Conference	Bloomsburg; California (PA)	6–0; 6–0	8–1; 7–1	Robert B. Redman; Earl Bruce
Pioneer Conference	Quincy	3–0	8–1	Mac Wenskunas
Rocky Mountain Conference	Colorado College	3–0	6–3	Allison Binns
Smoky Mountain Conference	Emory and Henry	4–0	11–1	Conley Snidow
South Dakota Intercollegiate Conference	Southern State	5–0–1	7–0–1	Jack Martin
Southern California Conference	Whittier	4–0	8–1	Wallace Newman
Southern Intercollegiate Athletic Conference	Florida A&M	6–0	7–2	Jake Gaither
Southwestern Athletic Conference	Langston; Southern	6–0–1; 6–0–1	8–1–1; 10–1–1	Caesar Felton Gayles; Ace Mumford
Texas Conference	McMurry	4–0–1	8–2–1	Wilford Moore
Upper Peninsula Conference	Northern Michigan		6–1	C. V. Money
Virginia Little Six Conference	Emory and Henry	2–0	11–1	Conley Snidow
Volunteer State Athletic Conference	Middle Tennessee	2–0	8–0–1	Charles M. Murphy
West Virginia Intercollegiate Athletic Conference	West Virginia Tech	8–0–1	8–0–1	Herb Royer
Wisconsin State Teachers College Conference	La Crosse State; Stevens Point State	5–1; 5–1	7–2; 6–1–1	Clark Van Galder; Hale Quandt
Yankee Conference	Connecticut; Maine	2–0–1; 2–0–1	4–4–1; 2–4–1	J. Orlean Christian; David M. Nelson

== Conference standings ==
=== Major conference standings ===
1949 Big Nine Conference football standings
	Conf.					Overall
Team	W		L		T	W		L		T
No. 6 Ohio State +	4	–	1	–	1	7	–	1	–	2
No. 7 Michigan +	4	–	1	–	1	6	–	2	–	1
No. 8 Minnesota	4	–	2	–	0	7	–	2	–	0
Wisconsin	3	–	2	–	1	5	–	3	–	1
Illinois	3	–	3	–	1	3	–	4	–	2
Iowa	3	–	3	–	0	4	–	5	–	0
Northwestern	3	–	4	–	0	4	–	5	–	0
Purdue	2	–	4	–	0	4	–	5	–	0
Indiana	0	–	6	–	0	1	–	8	–	0
+ – Conference co-champions; Rankings from AP Poll

1949 Big Seven Conference football standings
	Conf.					Overall
Team	W		L		T	W		L		T
No. 2 Oklahoma $	5	–	0	–	0	11	–	0	–	0
No. 20 Missouri	5	–	1	–	0	7	–	4	–	0
Iowa State	3	–	3	–	0	5	–	3	–	1
Nebraska	3	–	3	–	0	4	–	5	–	0
Kansas	2	–	4	–	0	5	–	5	–	0
Colorado	1	–	4	–	0	3	–	7	–	0
Kansas State	1	–	5	–	0	2	–	8	–	0
$ – Conference champion; Rankings from AP Poll

1949 Border Conference football standings
	Conf.					Overall
Team	W		L		T	W		L		T
Texas Tech $	5	–	0	–	0	7	–	5	–	0
Arizona State	4	–	1	–	0	7	–	3	–	0
Texas Western	4	–	2	–	0	8	–	2	–	1
Hardin–Simmons	4	–	2	–	0	6	–	4	–	1
West Texas State	3	–	2	–	0	5	–	4	–	0
Arizona	2	–	4	–	0	2	–	7	–	1
New Mexico A&M	1	–	4	–	0	4	–	6	–	0
New Mexico	1	–	6	–	0	2	–	8	–	0
Arizona State–Flagstaff	0	–	3	–	0	1	–	6	–	1
$ – Conference champion

1949 Missouri Valley Conference football standings
	Conf.					Overall
Team	W		L		T	W		L		T
Detroit $	4	–	0	–	0	5	–	4	–	0
Drake	3	–	1	–	0	6	–	2	–	1
Oklahoma A&M	2	–	1	–	1	4	–	4	–	2
Wichita	2	–	3	–	1	3	–	6	–	1
Tulsa	1	–	2	–	1	5	–	5	–	1
Bradley	1	–	3	–	0	5	–	5	–	0
Saint Louis	0	–	3	–	1	2	–	6	–	0
$ – Conference champion

1949 Pacific Coast Conference football standings
	Conf.					Overall
Team	W		L		T	W		L		T
No. 3 California $	7	–	0	–	0	10	–	1	–	0
UCLA	5	–	2	–	0	6	–	3	–	0
Stanford	4	–	2	–	0	7	–	3	–	1
USC	4	–	2	–	0	5	–	3	–	1
Oregon State	5	–	3	–	0	7	–	3	–	0
Oregon	2	–	5	–	0	4	–	6	–	0
Washington	2	–	5	–	0	3	–	7	–	0
Washington State	2	–	6	–	0	3	–	6	–	0
Idaho	1	–	4	–	0	3	–	5	–	0
Montana	0	–	3	–	0	5	–	4	–	0
$ – Conference champion; Rankings from AP Poll

1949 Skyline Six Conference football standings
	Conf.					Overall
Team	W		L		T	W		L		T
Wyoming $	5	–	0	–	0	9	–	1	–	0
Colorado A&M	4	–	1	–	0	9	–	1	–	0
Denver	2	–	2	–	0	4	–	6	–	0
Utah	2	–	3	–	0	2	–	7	–	1
Utah State	1	–	3	–	0	3	–	7	–	0
BYU	0	–	5	–	0	0	–	11	–	0
$ – Conference champion

1949 Southeastern Conference football standings
	Conf.					Overall
Team	W		L		T	W		L		T
Tulane $	5	–	1	–	0	7	–	2	–	1
No. 11 Kentucky	4	–	1	–	0	9	–	3	–	0
No. 17 Tennessee	4	–	1	–	1	7	–	2	–	1
Georgia Tech	5	–	2	–	0	7	–	3	–	0
No. 9 LSU	4	–	2	–	0	8	–	3	–	0
Alabama	4	–	3	–	1	6	–	3	–	1
Vanderbilt	4	–	4	–	0	5	–	5	–	0
Auburn	2	–	4	–	2	2	–	4	–	3
Ole Miss	2	–	4	–	0	4	–	5	–	1
Florida	1	–	4	–	1	4	–	5	–	1
Georgia	1	–	4	–	1	4	–	6	–	1
Mississippi State	0	–	6	–	0	0	–	8	–	1
$ – Conference champion; Rankings from AP Poll

1949 Southern Conference football standings
	Conf.					Overall
Team	W		L		T	W		L		T
No. 16 North Carolina $	5	–	0	–	0	7	–	4	–	0
No. 14 Maryland	4	–	0	–	0	9	–	1	–	0
Washington and Lee	3	–	1	–	1	3	–	5	–	1
Duke	4	–	2	–	0	6	–	3	–	0
William & Mary	4	–	2	–	0	6	–	4	–	0
VMI	3	–	2	–	1	3	–	5	–	1
The Citadel	2	–	2	–	0	4	–	5	–	0
Clemson	2	–	2	–	0	4	–	4	–	2
Furman	3	–	3	–	0	3	–	6	–	0
South Carolina	3	–	3	–	0	4	–	6	–	0
Wake Forest	3	–	3	–	0	4	–	6	–	0
George Washington	2	–	3	–	0	4	–	5	–	0
NC State	3	–	6	–	0	3	–	7	–	0
VPI	1	–	5	–	2	1	–	7	–	2
Richmond	2	–	6	–	0	3	–	7	–	0
Davidson	1	–	5	–	0	2	–	8	–	0
$ – Conference champion; Rankings from AP Poll

1949 Southwest Conference football standings
	Conf.					Overall
Team	W		L		T	W		L		T
No. 5 Rice $	6	–	0	–	0	10	–	1	–	0
No. 20 Baylor	4	–	2	–	0	8	–	2	–	0
TCU	3	–	3	–	0	6	–	3	–	1
Texas	3	–	3	–	0	6	–	4	–	0
SMU	2	–	3	–	1	5	–	4	–	1
Arkansas	2	–	4	–	0	5	–	5	–	0
Texas A&M	0	–	5	–	1	1	–	8	–	1
$ – Conference champion; Rankings from AP Poll

=== Independents ===
1949 Eastern college football independents records
	Conf.			Overall
Team	W	L	T	W		L		T
Saint Vincent		–		10	–	0	–	0
No. 4 Army		–		9	–	0	–	0
Gannon		–		8	–	0	–	0
Trinity (CT)		–		8	–	0	–	0
Brown		–		8	–	1	–	0
No. 12 Cornell		–		8	–	1	–	0
No. 13 Villanova		–		8	–	1	–	0
Bucknell		–		6	–	2	–	0
Dartmouth		–		6	–	2	–	0
Buffalo		–		6	–	3	–	0
Pittsburgh		–		6	–	3	–	0
Princeton		–		6	–	3	–	0
Fordham		–		5	–	3	–	0
Tufts		–		5	–	3	–	1
Carnegie Tech		–		5	–	3	–	1
Penn State		–		5	–	4	–	0
Temple		–		5	–	4	–	0
Penn		–		4	–	4	–	0
Yale		–		4	–	4	–	0
Boston College		–		4	–	4	–	1
Syracuse		–		4	–	5	–	0
Drexel		–		3	–	3	–	1
Duquesne		–		3	–	6	–	0
Franklin & Marshall		–		2	–	5	–	2
CCNY		–		2	–	5	–	1
NYU		–		3	–	6	–	0
Columbia		–		2	–	7	–	0
Hofstra		–		1	–	5	–	1
Colgate		–		1	–	8	–	0
Harvard		–		1	–	8	–	0
Rankings from AP Poll

1949 Midwestern college football independents records
	Conf.			Overall
Team	W	L	T	W		L		T
No. 1 Notre Dame		–		10	–	0	–	0
Ball State		–		8	–	0	–	0
Xavier		–		10	–	1	–	0
Valparaiso		–		8	–	1	–	1
Washington University		–		7	–	2	–	0
Baldwin–Wallace		–		6	–	2	–	0
Wabash		–		5	–	2	–	1
Dayton		–		6	–	3	–	0
John Carroll		–		6	–	3	–	0
No. 19 Michigan State		–		6	–	3	–	0
Toledo		–		6	–	4	–	0
Michigan Tech		–		4	–	3	–	0
Youngstown		–		4	–	3	–	1
Bowling Green		–		4	–	5	–	0
Marquette		–		4	–	5	–	0
Central Michigan		–		3	–	4	–	0
Wayne		–		3	–	5	–	0
Indiana State		–		1	–	9	–	0
Michigan State Normal		–		0	–	8	–	0
Rankings from AP Poll

1949 Southern college football independents records
	Conf.			Overall
Team	W	L	T	W		L		T
Maryland State		–		8	–	0	–	0
Memphis State		–		9	–	1	–	0
Delaware		–		8	–	1	–	0
Virginia		–		7	–	2	–	0
Grambling		–		7	–	3	–	2
Miami (FL)		–		6	–	3	–	0
Sewanee		–		4	–	2	–	1
Chattanooga		–		5	–	4	–	0
Georgetown		–		5	–	5	–	0
West Virginia		–		4	–	6	–	1
Navy		–		3	–	5	–	1
Rollins		–		3	–	5	–	0
Texas State		–		3	–	6	–	1
Oklahoma City		–		2	–	8	–	0

1949 Western college football independents records
	Conf.			Overall
Team	W	L	T	W		L		T
No. 10 Pacific (CA)		–		11	–	0	–	0
Oregon College		–		9	–	0	–	0
No. 15 Santa Clara		–		8	–	2	–	1
San Francisco		–		7	–	3	–	0
Idaho State		–		6	–	2	–	1
Hawaii		–		6	–	3	–	0
La Verne		–		5	–	3	–	2
Loyola (CA)		–		6	–	4	–	0
Nevada		–		5	–	5	–	0
Pepperdine		–		4	–	5	–	0
Saint Mary's		–		3	–	6	–	1
Portland		–		3	–	5	–	0
Cal Poly San Dimas		–		2	–	8	–	0
Rankings from AP Poll

=== Minor conference standings ===
1949 Alabama Intercollegiate Conference football standings
	Conf.					Overall
Team	W		L		T	W		L		T
Livingston State +	3	–	0	–	1	7	–	2	–	1
Troy State +	2	–	0	–	1	6	–	3	–	1
Jacksonville State	3	–	2	–	0	6	–	3	–	0
Marion	1	–	1	–	0	?	–	?	–	?
Florence State	1	–	3	–	0	4	–	5	–	0
Athens	0	–	2	–	0	5	–	4	–	1
St. Bernard	0	–	3	–	0	?	–	?	–	?
+ – Conference co-champions

1949 Badger-Illini Conference football standings
	Conf.					Overall
Team	W		L		T	W		L		T
Lewis $	6	–	0	–	0	9	–	0	–	0
Milton	6	–	1	–	0	6	–	2	–	0
Concordia (IL)	5	–	1	–	0	6	–	1	–	0
Mission House	4	–	2	–	0	4	–	3	–	0
Northwestern (WI)	3	–	4	–	0	3	–	4	–	0
Wisconsin Tech	2	–	3	–	0	2	–	4	–	0
Aurora	2	–	5	–	0	2	–	5	–	0
St. Procopius	0	–	6	–	1	0	–	6	–	1
Wisconsin–Extension	0	–	6	–	1	0	–	6	–	1
$ – Conference champion

1949 California Collegiate Athletic Association football standings
	Conf.					Overall
Team	W		L		T	W		L		T
San Jose State $	4	–	0	–	0	9	–	4	–	0
San Diego State	3	–	1	–	0	6	–	3	–	0
Cal Poly	1	–	3	–	0	4	–	6	–	0
Fresno State	1	–	3	–	0	3	–	8	–	0
Santa Barbara	1	–	3	–	0	2	–	7	–	0
$ – Conference champion

1949 Central Intercollegiate Conference football standings
	Conf.					Overall
Team	W		L		T	W		L		T
Washburn +	5	–	1	–	0	7	–	2	–	0
Pittsburg State +	5	–	1	–	0	8	–	2	–	1
Emporia State	4	–	2	–	0	6	–	4	–	0
Fort Hays State	4	–	2	–	0	5	–	4	–	0
St. Benedict's	2	–	4	–	0	4	–	5	–	0
Southwestern (KS)	1	–	5	–	0	2	–	7	–	0
Rockhurst	0	–	6	–	0	1	–	9	–	0
+ – Conference co-champions

1949 College Conference of Illinois football standings
	Conf.					Overall
Team	W		L		T	W		L		T
Wheaton (IL) +	5	–	0	–	0	8	–	2	–	0
Augustana (IL) +	5	–	0	–	0	6	–	2	–	0
Lake Forest	3	–	2	–	0	3	–	5	–	0
Illinois Wesleyan	2	–	2	–	0	4	–	5	–	0
Millikin	2	–	2	–	1	2	–	5	–	1
North Central (IL)	2	–	3	–	1	3	–	4	–	1
Illinois College	1	–	2	–	1	4	–	3	–	1
Carthage	1	–	4	–	1	2	–	6	–	1
Elmhurst	0	–	6	–	0	0	–	8	–	0
+ – Conference co-champions

1949 Colored Intercollegiate Athletic Association football standings
	Conf.					Overall
Team	W		L		T	W		L		T
No. 1 Morgan State $	7	–	0	–	0	8	–	0	–	0
No. 2 West Virginia State	5	–	0	–	1	8	–	0	–	1
No. 6 North Carolina A&T	5	–	1	–	0	7	–	2	–	0
No. 6 Shaw	7	–	2	–	0	7	–	2	–	0
No. 25 St. Augustine's	5	–	2	–	0	6	–	2	–	0
No. 21 Virginia State	4	–	2	–	1	4	–	2	–	1
No. 22 Howard	6	–	3	–	0	6	–	3	–	0
No. 24 North Carolina College	3	–	4	–	0	5	–	4	–	0
No. 13 Hampton	3	–	4	–	0	5	–	4	–	0
Winston-Salem State	1	–	2	–	3	3	–	3	–	3
Delaware State	3	–	5	–	1	3	–	5	–	1
Johnson C. Smith	2	–	3	–	1	2	–	4	–	1
Lincoln (PA)	2	–	4	–	0	3	–	5	–	0
Bluefield State	1	–	5	–	1	2	–	5	–	1
Virginia Union	0	–	7	–	0	0	–	8	–	0
Saint Paul's (VA)	0	–	8	–	0	0	–	8	–	0
$ – Conference champion; Conference tandings were based on the Dickinson System.; Rankings from the Pittsburgh Courier

1949 Dixie Conference football standings
	Conf.					Overall
Team	W		L		T	W		L		T
Florida State $	4	–	0	–	0	9	–	1	–	0
Howard (AL)	2	–	0	–	0	4	–	5	–	0
Stetson	2	–	2	–	0	4	–	5	–	1
Mississippi College	2	–	2	–	0	4	–	5	–	0
Tampa	0	–	2	–	0	0	–	8	–	0
Millsaps	0	–	4	–	0	2	–	5	–	0
$ – Conference champion

1949 Eastern Intercollegiate Athletic Conference football standings
	Conf.					Overall
Team	W		L		T	W		L		T
Norfolk State $	5	–	0	–	0	6	–	0	–	0
Morristown	4	–	1	–	0	8	–	2	–	1
Storer	3	–	2	–	0	?	–	?	–	?
Elizabeth City State	3	–	2	–	1	4	–	3	–	1
Fayetteville State	1	–	3	–	1	2	–	5	–	1
Livingstone	1	–	4	–	0	2	–	4	–	0
Virginia Seminary	1	–	4	–	0	?	–	?	–	?
Friendship	0	–	2	–	0	?	–	?	–	?
$ – Conference champion; Standings were based on Dickinson System ratings.

1949 Evergreen Conference football standings
	Conf.					Overall
Team	W		L		T	W		L		T
Puget Sound +	5	–	1	–	0	7	–	1	–	0
Eastern Washington +	5	–	1	–	0	7	–	2	–	0
Western Washington	3	–	2	–	1	4	–	4	–	1
Pacific Lutheran	2	–	3	–	1	2	–	5	–	2
Whitworth	2	–	4	–	0	5	–	4	–	0
Central Washington	2	–	4	–	0	3	–	6	–	0
Saint Martin's	1	–	5	–	0	3	–	6	–	0
+ – Conference co-champions

1949 Far Western Conference football standings
	Conf.					Overall
Team	W		L		T	W		L		T
Cal Aggies $	4	–	0	–	0	5	–	4	–	0
Southern Oregon	2	–	1	–	1	5	–	2	–	1
San Francisco State	1	–	2	–	1	3	–	4	–	1
Chico State	1	–	2	–	1	2	–	6	–	1
Humboldt State	0	–	3	–	1	0	–	8	–	1
$ – Conference champion

1949 Gulf Coast Conference football standings
	Conf.					Overall
Team	W		L		T	W		L		T
Hardin $	3	–	0	–	0	10	–	1	–	0
North Texas State	2	–	1	–	0	8	–	4	–	0
Houston	1	–	2	–	0	5	–	4	–	1
Trinity (TX)	0	–	3	–	0	6	–	5	–	1
$ – Conference champion

1949 Gulf States Conference football standings
	Conf.					Overall
Team	W		L		T	W		L		T
Louisiana Tech $	5	–	0	–	0	7	–	2	–	0
Mississippi Southern	2	–	1	–	0	7	–	3	–	0
Southwestern Louisiana	3	–	2	–	0	6	–	3	–	0
Southeastern Louisiana	1	–	2	–	1	4	–	5	–	1
Northwestern State	1	–	4	–	0	5	–	4	–	0
Louisiana College	0	–	3	–	1	4	–	6	–	1
$ – Conference champion

1949 Hoosier Conference football standings
	Conf.					Overall
Team	W		L		T	W		L		T
Hanover $	6	–	0	–	0	8	–	1	–	0
Anderson (IN)	5	–	1	–	0	6	–	2	–	0
Taylor	2	–	1	–	2	4	–	3	–	2
Indiana Central	3	–	4	–	0	4	–	4	–	0
Franklin (IN)	2	–	3	–	1	3	–	4	–	1
Canterbury	2	–	3	–	1	2	–	5	–	1
Earlham	2	–	3	–	0	3	–	6	–	0
Rose Poly	1	–	3	–	1	4	–	3	–	1
Manchester (IN)	0	–	5	–	1	1	–	6	–	1
$ – Conference champion

1949 Illinois Intercollegiate Athletic Conference football standings
	Conf.					Overall
Team	W		L		T	W		L		T
Western Illinois $	4	–	0	–	0	9	–	1	–	0
Northern Illinois State	2	–	1	–	1	7	–	2	–	1
Eastern Illinois	2	–	2	–	0	3	–	5	–	0
Illinois State Normal	1	–	2	–	1	6	–	2	–	1
Southern Illinois	0	–	4	–	0	2	–	7	–	0
$ – Conference champion

1949 Iowa Conference football standings
	Conf.					Overall
Team	W		L		T	W		L		T
Simpson (IA) $	6	–	0	–	0	8	–	1	–	0
Dubuque	4	–	1	–	0	6	–	2	–	0
Central (IA)	3	–	1	–	0	4	–	4	–	1
Upper Iowa	3	–	2	–	0	6	–	3	–	0
Wartburg	4	–	3	–	0	5	–	4	–	0
Westmar	1	–	1	–	0	4	–	4	–	0
Parsons	2	–	4	–	0	3	–	5	–	0
Buena Vista	1	–	3	–	0	4	–	4	–	1
Luther	1	–	3	–	0	2	–	5	–	1
Iowa Wesleyan	1	–	4	–	0	3	–	6	–	0
William Penn	0	–	4	–	0	1	–	6	–	0
$ – Conference champion

1949 Kansas Collegiate Athletic Conference football standings
	Conf.					Overall
Team	W		L		T	W		L		T
Baker $	5	–	1	–	0	7	–	2	–	0
Ottawa	4	–	2	–	0	5	–	4	–	0
Bethany (KS)	4	–	2	–	0	5	–	4	–	0
Kansas Wesleyan	3	–	3	–	0	3	–	6	–	0
College of Emporia	3	–	3	–	0	4	–	5	–	0
Bethel (KS)	2	–	4	–	0	3	–	5	–	0
McPherson	0	–	6	–	0	1	–	8	–	0
$ – Conference champion

1949 Lone Star Conference football standings
	Conf.					Overall
Team	W		L		T	W		L		T
East Texas State $	3	–	0	–	0	5	–	3	–	1
Stephen F. Austin	2	–	1	–	0	7	–	2	–	0
Southwest Texas State	1	–	2	–	0	3	–	6	–	1
Sam Houston State	0	–	3	–	0	3	–	7	–	0
$ – Conference champion

1949 Mason–Dixon Conference football standings
	Conf.					Overall
Team	W		L		T	W		L		T
Western Maryland $	4	–	0	–	0	7	–	1	–	0
Hampden–Sydney	2	–	1	–	0	5	–	4	–	0
Johns Hopkins	2	–	1	–	0	4	–	4	–	0
Washington College	2	–	2	–	1	3	–	2	–	2
Mount St. Mary's	1	–	1	–	0	3	–	6	–	0
Bridgewater	1	–	1	–	0	1	–	3	–	0
Randolph–Macon	2	–	2	–	0	2	–	7	–	0
Catholic University	1	–	3	–	1	1	–	5	–	1
Gallaudet	0	–	4	–	0	0	–	5	–	0
$ – Conference champion; Conference standings were based on the Dickinson Scoring System.

1949 Michigan Intercollegiate Athletic Association football standings
	Conf.					Overall
Team	W		L		T	W		L		T
Hillsdale $	5	–	0	–	0	9	–	1	–	0
Hope	4	–	1	–	0	7	–	1	–	0
Alma	2	–	2	–	1	5	–	2	–	1
Adrian	2	–	2	–	1	4	–	3	–	1
Kalamazoo	1	–	4	–	0	2	–	6	–	0
Albion	0	–	5	–	0	2	–	6	–	1
$ – Conference champion

1949 Mid-American Conference football standings
	Conf.					Overall
Team	W		L		T	W		L		T
Cincinnati $	4	–	0	–	0	7	–	4	–	0
Miami (OH)	3	–	1	–	0	5	–	4	–	0
Ohio	2	–	2	–	0	4	–	4	–	1
Western Michigan	2	–	3	–	0	4	–	4	–	0
Western Reserve	1	–	3	–	1	4	–	5	–	1
Butler	0	–	3	–	0	2	–	6	–	0
$ – Conference champion

1949 Mid-Ohio League football standings
	Conf.					Overall
Team	W		L		T	W		L		T
Findlay $	4	–	0	–	0	5	–	3	–	0
Ashland	3	–	1	–	0	6	–	4	–	0
Cedarville	2	–	2	–	0	3	–	6	–	1
Defiance	1	–	3	–	0	2	–	7	–	0
Bluffton	0	–	4	–	0	0	–	8	–	0
$ – Conference champion

1949 Midlands Conference football standings
	Conf.					Overall
Team	W		L		T	W		L		T
St. Ambrose $	3	–	0	–	0	8	–	0	–	0
St. Norbert	2	–	1	–	0	4	–	4	–	0
Saint Joseph's (IN)	1	–	2	–	0	5	–	4	–	0
Loras	0	–	3	–	0	3	–	5	–	0
$ – Conference champion

1949 Midwest Athletic Association football standings
	Conf.					Overall
Team	W		L		T	W		L		T
No. 4 Tennessee A&I $	4	–	0	–	0	9	–	1	–	0
No. 16 Wilberforce State	2	–	1	–	0	5	–	4	–	0
No. 16 Kentucky State	2	–	2	–	0	6	–	4	–	0
Louisville Municipal	0	–	2	–	0	3	–	5	–	0
Lincoln (MO)	0	–	3	–	0	3	–	6	–	0
$ – Conference champion; Rankings from the Pittsburgh Courier

1949 Midwest Conference football standings
	Conf.					Overall
Team	W		L		T	W		L		T
Lawrence $	6	–	0	–	0	7	–	1	–	0
Ripon	4	–	1	–	1	5	–	2	–	1
Knox	4	–	2	–	0	5	–	3	–	0
Carleton	4	–	2	–	0	4	–	4	–	0
Monmouth (IL)	3	–	2	–	1	4	–	3	–	1
Grinnell	3	–	3	–	0	5	–	3	–	0
Beloit	1	–	5	–	0	2	–	6	–	0
Cornell (IA)	1	–	5	–	0	1	–	7	–	0
Coe	0	–	6	–	0	1	–	6	–	1
$ – Conference champion

1949 Minnesota Intercollegiate Athletic Conference football standings
	Conf.					Overall
Team	W		L		T	W		L		T
St. Thomas (MN) $	6	–	0	–	0	6	–	2	–	0
Gustavus Adolphus	5	–	1	–	0	8	–	1	–	0
Saint John's (MN)	4	–	2	–	0	6	–	2	–	0
Hamline	3	–	3	–	0	4	–	3	–	0
Macalester	2	–	3	–	1	3	–	4	–	1
Concordia (MN)	2	–	3	–	0	4	–	5	–	0
St. Olaf	2	–	4	–	0	5	–	4	–	0
Augsburg	1	–	3	–	1	2	–	3	–	2
Saint Mary's (MN)	0	–	6	–	0	0	–	7	–	0
$ – Conference champion

1949 Minnesota Teachers College Conference football standings
	Conf.					Overall
Team	W		L		T	W		L		T
Mankato State $	3	–	1	–	0	4	–	3	–	1
Bemidji State	2	–	1	–	1	4	–	3	–	1
St. Cloud State	2	–	1	–	1	3	–	4	–	1
Moorhead State	1	–	2	–	1	3	–	4	–	1
Winona State	0	–	3	–	1	2	–	5	–	0
$ – Conference champion

1949 Missouri College Athletic Union football standings
	Conf.					Overall
Team	W		L		T	W		L		T
Missouri Valley $	3	–	0	–	0	8	–	3	–	0
Central (MO)	2	–	1	–	0	8	–	1	–	0
William Jewell	1	–	2	–	0	3	–	7	–	0
Culver–Stockton	0	–	3	–	0	3	–	6	–	0
$ – Conference champion

1949 Missouri Intercollegiate Athletic Association football standings
	Conf.					Overall
Team	W		L		T	W		L		T
Missouri Mines $	5	–	0	–	0	6	–	2	–	0
NW Missouri State	3	–	1	–	1	5	–	2	–	1
SW Missouri State	3	–	1	–	1	5	–	3	–	1
Central Missouri State	2	–	3	–	0	3	–	5	–	0
Kirksville State	1	–	4	–	0	2	–	7	–	0
SE Missouri State	0	–	5	–	0	2	–	7	–	0
$ – Conference champion

1949 Montana Collegiate Conference football standings
	Conf.					Overall
Team	W		L		T	W		L		T
Western Montana $	4	–	0	–	0	4	–	0	–	1
Carroll (MT)	2	–	1	–	0	3	–	1	–	0
Eastern Montana	1	–	2	–	0	1	–	5	–	0
Montana Mines	0	–	4	–	0	1	–	4	–	0
$ – Conference champion

1949 Nebraska College Conference football standings
	Conf.					Overall
Team	W		L		T	W		L		T
Wayne State (NE) $	8	–	0	–	0	9	–	0	–	0
Chadron State	6	–	2	–	0	7	–	3	–	0
Doane	5	–	2	–	0	5	–	4	–	0
Kearney State	3	–	3	–	1	5	–	3	–	1
Hastings	3	–	3	–	1	4	–	3	–	1
Nebraska Wesleyan	4	–	4	–	0	4	–	5	–	0
Peru State	2	–	5	–	0	4	–	5	–	0
York (NE)	0	–	6	–	0	2	–	7	–	0
Midland	0	–	6	–	0	1	–	7	–	0
$ – Conference champion

1949 New Mexico Conference football standings
	Conf.					Overall
Team	W		L		T	W		L		T
Sul Ross $	5	–	0	–	0	7	–	3	–	0
Adams State	3	–	1	–	1	5	–	3	–	1
Eastern New Mexico	4	–	2	–	1	6	–	4	–	1
New Mexico Western	4	–	3	–	0	6	–	3	–	0
New Mexico Military	3	–	4	–	0	4	–	5	–	0
Panhandle A&M	3	–	4	–	0	4	–	6	–	0
New Mexico Highlands	2	–	4	–	0	4	–	5	–	0
St. Michael's (NM)	0	–	6	–	0	1	–	9	–	0
$ – Conference champion

1949 North Central Conference football standings
	Conf.					Overall
Team	W		L		T	W		L		T
Iowa State Teachers +	5	–	1	–	0	5	–	2	–	0
South Dakota State +	5	–	1	–	0	7	–	3	–	0
Morningside	3	–	2	–	1	7	–	3	–	1
North Dakota	3	–	2	–	1	4	–	3	–	1
South Dakota	2	–	2	–	2	2	–	5	–	2
Augustana (SD)	1	–	5	–	0	2	–	6	–	0
North Dakota State	0	–	6	–	0	0	–	9	–	0
+ – Conference co-champions

1949 North Dakota Intercollegiate Conference football standings
	Conf.					Overall
Team	W		L		T	W		L		T
Valley City State $	5	–	0	–	0	8	–	1	–	0
Minot State	4	–	1	–	0	5	–	1	–	1
Ellendale	4	–	1	–	0	4	–	2	–	0
Dickinson State	3	–	2	–	0	5	–	3	–	0
Jamestown	3	–	2	–	0	3	–	5	–	0
Wahpeton Science	3	–	3	–	0	3	–	4	–	1
Mayville State	2	–	5	–	0	2	–	7	–	0
Bottineau	1	–	5	–	0	1	–	5	–	1
Bismarck JC	0	–	6	–	0	0	–	6	–	0
$ – Conference champion

1949 North State Conference football standings
	Conf.					Overall
Team	W		L		T	W		L		T
Western Carolina $	4	–	0	–	0	8	–	3	–	0
Appalachian State	6	–	2	–	0	8	–	3	–	0
Elon	5	–	2	–	0	8	–	2	–	0
Catawba	4	–	2	–	0	5	–	5	–	0
Lenoir Rhyne	5	–	3	–	0	7	–	3	–	0
Guilford	2	–	3	–	1	4	–	5	–	1
East Carolina	1	–	4	–	1	4	–	5	–	1
Atlantic Christian	0	–	5	–	2	1	–	7	–	2
High Point	0	–	6	–	0	0	–	9	–	0
$ – Conference champion

1949 Northwest Conference football standings
	Conf.					Overall
Team	W		L		T	W		L		T
Pacific (OR) +	4	–	1	–	0	8	–	1	–	0
College of Idaho +	4	–	1	–	0	6	–	2	–	0
Lewis & Clark +	4	–	1	–	0	6	–	3	–	0
Linfield	2	–	3	–	0	4	–	4	–	0
Willamette	1	–	4	–	0	3	–	6	–	0
Whitman	0	–	5	–	0	3	–	6	–	0
+ – Conference co-champions

1949 Ohio Athletic Conference football standings
	Conf.					Overall
Team	W		L		T	W		L		T
Muskingum $	7	–	0	–	0	8	–	1	–	0
Ohio Wesleyan	4	–	0	–	0	7	–	2	–	0
Kent State	2	–	0	–	0	5	–	3	–	0
Heidelberg	4	–	1	–	0	8	–	1	–	0
Denison	4	–	2	–	0	5	–	3	–	0
Wooster	4	–	3	–	1	5	–	3	–	1
Otterbein	2	–	3	–	0	5	–	3	–	0
Mount Union	2	–	3	–	0	3	–	6	–	0
Wittenberg	2	–	3	–	0	2	–	7	–	0
Capital	2	–	5	–	0	2	–	6	–	0
Oberlin	1	–	5	–	0	2	–	6	–	0
Akron	0	–	3	–	1	2	–	6	–	1
Marietta	0	–	2	–	0	2	–	6	–	0
Kenyon	0	–	4	–	0	0	–	6	–	0
$ – Conference champion

1949 Ohio Valley Conference football standings
	Conf.					Overall
Team	W		L		T	W		L		T
Marshall	4	–	0	–	0	6	–	4	–	0
Louisville	3	–	0	–	0	8	–	3	–	0
Evansville $	3	–	1	–	1	8	–	2	–	1
Morehead State	3	–	3	–	0	6	–	3	–	0
Eastern Kentucky	2	–	2	–	1	4	–	4	–	1
Western Kentucky	2	–	3	–	0	5	–	4	–	0
Murray State	1	–	6	–	0	1	–	7	–	1
Tennessee Tech	0	–	3	–	0	3	–	6	–	0
$ – Conference champion; Evansville declared champion because Marshall and Louisville did not play required games in 1949

1949 Oklahoma Collegiate Conference football standings
	Conf.					Overall
Team	W		L		T	W		L		T
Central State (OK) $	5	–	0	–	0	7	–	2	–	0
SE Oklahoma State	4	–	1	–	0	7	–	3	–	0
East Central	2	–	3	–	0	5	–	5	–	0
NW Oklahoma State	2	–	3	–	0	4	–	4	–	0
SW Oklahoma State	1	–	4	–	0	3	–	7	–	0
Northeastern State	1	–	4	–	0	2	–	7	–	1
$ – Conference champion

1949 Pennsylvania State Teachers College Conference football standings
	Conf.					Overall
Team	W		L		T	W		L		T
Bloomsburg $	6	–	0	–	0	8	–	1	–	0
California (PA)	6	–	0	–	0	7	–	1	–	0
West Chester	3	–	0	–	0	8	–	1	–	0
Slippery Rock	3	–	1	–	1	6	–	2	–	1
Kutztown	2	–	1	–	1	5	–	2	–	1
East Stroudsburg	3	–	2	–	0	5	–	3	–	0
Clarion	2	–	2	–	0	6	–	2	–	0
Indiana (PA)	3	–	3	–	1	4	–	4	–	1
Lock Haven	2	–	3	–	0	3	–	7	–	0
Shippensburg	1	–	5	–	1	1	–	6	–	1
Millersville	1	–	6	–	0	1	–	7	–	0
Edinboro	0	–	4	–	1	1	–	5	–	2
Mansfield	0	–	5	–	1	1	–	5	–	1
$ – Conference champion

1949 Pioneer Conference (Illinois) football standings
	Conf.					Overall
Team	W		L		T	W		L		T
Quincy (IL) $	3	–	0	–	0	8	–	1	–	0
McKendree	1	–	2	–	0	3	–	5	–	0
Eureka	1	–	2	–	0	1	–	7	–	0
Shurtleff	1	–	2	–	0	1	–	7	–	0
$ – Conference champion

1949 Rocky Mountain Conference football standings
	Conf.					Overall
Team	W		L		T	W		L		T
Colorado College $	3	–	0	–	0	6	–	3	–	0
Colorado Mines	2	–	1	–	0	4	–	4	–	1
Western State (CO)	1	–	2	–	0	5	–	3	–	0
Colorado State–Greeley	0	–	3	–	0	0	–	8	–	0
$ – Conference champion

1949 Smoky Mountain Conference football standings
	Conf.					Overall
Team	W		L		T	W		L		T
Emory and Henry $	4	–	0	–	0	11	–	1	–	0
East Tennessee State	3	–	1	–	0	5	–	4	–	0
Milligan	1	–	2	–	1	3	–	5	–	2
Carson–Newman	1	–	3	–	0	2	–	7	–	1
Tusculum	0	–	3	–	1	2	–	5	–	1
$ – Conference champion

1949 South Dakota Intercollegiate Conference football standings
	Conf.					Overall
Team	W		L		T	W		L		T
Southern State (SD) $	5	–	0	–	1	7	–	0	–	1
Huron	4	–	1	–	0	6	–	2	–	1
Black Hills	3	–	1	–	0	5	–	4	–	1
Dakota Wesleyan	2	–	2	–	1	3	–	3	–	2
South Dakota Mines	1	–	1	–	2	2	–	3	–	2
Yankton	2	–	3	–	0	2	–	6	–	0
Sioux Falls	1	–	4	–	0	1	–	7	–	0
General Beadle	1	–	5	–	0	2	–	7	–	0
Northern State	0	–	2	–	2	1	–	5	–	2
$ – Conference champion

1949 Southern California Conference football standings
	Conf.					Overall
Team	W		L		T	W		L		T
Whittier $	4	–	0	–	0	8	–	1	–	0
Pomona	3	–	1	–	0	6	–	2	–	0
Redlands	2	–	2	–	0	4	–	3	–	1
Occidental	1	–	3	–	0	4	–	4	–	0
Caltech	0	–	4	–	0	0	–	6	–	1
$ – Conference champion

1949 Southern Intercollegiate Athletic Conference football standings
	Conf.					Overall
Team	W		L		T	W		L		T
Florida A&M $	6	–	0	–	0	7	–	2	–	0
Benedict	5	–	1	–	0	6	–	1	–	0
Fisk	4	–	1	–	0	6	–	3	–	0
Morris Brown	4	–	2	–	1	6	–	3	–	1
Alabama A&M	3	–	2	–	2	6	–	2	–	2
Clark (GA)	4	–	3	–	0	4	–	4	–	0
Tuskegee	4	–	3	–	0	4	–	6	–	0
Fort Valley State	2	–	2	–	1	5	–	3	–	1
South Carolina State	2	–	2	–	1	3	–	4	–	1
LeMoyne	2	–	3	–	0	4	–	4	–	0
Morehouse	2	–	4	–	1	3	–	4	–	1
Alabama State	2	–	5	–	2	2	–	6	–	2
Xavier (LA)	1	–	5	–	0	4	–	6	–	0
Allen	0	–	3	–	0	5	–	6	–	0
Lane	0	–	4	–	0	0	–	7	–	0
$ – Conference champion

1949 Southwestern Athletic Conference football standings
	Conf.					Overall
Team	W		L		T	W		L		T
No. 2 Southern +	6	–	0	–	1	10	–	0	–	1
No. 9 Langston +	6	–	0	–	1	8	–	1	–	1
No. 13 Prairie View A&M	5	–	2	–	0	8	–	3	–	0
No. T–27 Bishop	4	–	3	–	0	5	–	3	–	1
Texas College	2	–	4	–	1	2	–	6	–	2
No. 25 Arkansas AM&N	1	–	4	–	2	5	–	4	–	2
Samuel Huston	1	–	6	–	0	1	–	7	–	0
Wiley	0	–	6	–	1	0	–	9	–	1
$ – Conference champion; Rankings from the Pittsburgh Courier using the Dickinson Ratings System.

1949 Texas Conference football standings
	Conf.					Overall
Team	W		L		T	W		L		T
McMurry $	4	–	0	–	1	8	–	2	–	1
Texas A&I	3	–	2	–	0	8	–	2	–	0
Howard Payne	3	–	2	–	0	6	–	5	–	0
Austin	3	–	2	–	0	5	–	5	–	0
Abilene Christian	1	–	4	–	0	3	–	6	–	0
Southwestern (TX)	0	–	4	–	1	3	–	7	–	2
$ – Conference champion

1949 Virginia Little Six Conference football standings
	Conf.					Overall
Team	W		L		T	W		L		T
Emory and Henry $	2	–	0	–	0	11	–	1	–	0
Hampden–Sydney	1	–	1	–	0	5	–	4	–	0
Bridgewater	0	–	0	–	0	1	–	3	–	0
Randolph–Macon	0	–	2	–	0	2	–	7	–	0
$ – Conference champion

1949 Volunteer State Athletic Conference football standings
	Conf.					Overall
Team	W		L		T	W		L		T
Middle Tennessee $	2	–	0	–	0	8	–	0	–	1
Austin Peay	1	–	0	–	0	8	–	2	–	0
Milligan	0	–	1	–	0	3	–	5	–	2
Union (TN)	0	–	2	–	0	1	–	8	–	1
$ – Conference champion

1949 West Virginia Intercollegiate Athletic Conference football standings
	Conf.					Overall
Team	W		L		T	W		L		T
West Virginia Tech $	8	–	0	–	1	8	–	0	–	1
West Liberty State	4	–	0	–	1	9	–	0	–	1
Morris Harvey	3	–	1	–	0	7	–	2	–	0
Shepherd	4	–	2	–	0	6	–	2	–	0
Concord	4	–	2	–	0	5	–	4	–	0
Salem	1	–	1	–	3	3	–	1	–	3
Fairmont State	2	–	4	–	1	3	–	4	–	1
Potomac State	1	–	3	–	0	2	–	4	–	0
Davis & Elkins	2	–	6	–	0	2	–	6	–	0
West Virginia Wesleyan	1	–	6	–	1	1	–	9	–	1
Glenville State	0	–	6	–	1	0	–	6	–	1
Bethany (WV) *	2	–	1	–	0	2	–	6	–	0
$ – Conference champion; * – Did not qualify for conference standings Ties did not count in conference standings.

1949 Wisconsin State Teachers College Conference football standings
	Conf.					Overall
Team	W		L		T	W		L		T
La Crosse State +	5	–	1	–	0	7	–	2	–	0
Stevens Point State +	5	–	1	–	0	6	–	1	–	1
Stout Institute	4	–	2	–	0	6	–	2	–	0
Milwaukee State	3	–	2	–	1	3	–	4	–	1
Platteville State	3	–	3	–	0	3	–	3	–	0
Eau Claire State	2	–	3	–	1	3	–	4	–	1
Whitewater State	2	–	3	–	1	3	–	4	–	1
Superior State	2	–	4	–	0	3	–	6	–	0
River Falls State	1	–	4	–	1	1	–	6	–	1
Oshkosh State	1	–	5	–	0	1	–	5	–	0
+ – Conference co-champions; The La Crosse State–Whitewater State game on September 24 did not count in the conference standings.

1949 Yankee Conference football standings
	Conf.					Overall
Team	W		L		T	W		L		T
Connecticut +	2	–	0	–	1	4	–	4	–	1
Maine +	2	–	0	–	1	2	–	4	–	1
UMass	1	–	1	–	0	3	–	5	–	0
New Hampshire	1	–	3	–	0	4	–	4	–	0
Rhode Island State	0	–	4	–	0	0	–	8	–	0
Vermont	2	–	0	–	0	6	–	2	–	0
+ – Conference co-champions; Vermont was ineligible for the conference title.

== Rankings ==
The final AP poll was released in late November with Notre Dame receiving 172 of 248 first-place votes.

AP Poll
Rank	Team	1st	Points
1	Notre Dame (10–0)	172	2402
2	Oklahoma (11–0)	18	2018
3	California (10–1)	40	1900
4	Army (9–0)	12	1838
5	Rice (10–1)		1062
6	Ohio State (7–1–2)		968
7	Michigan (6–2–1)		848
8	Minnesota (7–2)		522
9	LSU (8–3)		516
10	Pacific (CA) (11–0)	4	248
11	Kentucky (9–3)		222
12	Cornell (8–1)		188
13	Villanova (8–1)	2	148
14	Maryland (9–1)		134
15	Santa Clara (8–2–1)		126
16	North Carolina (7–4)		106
17	Tennessee (7–2–1)		82
18	Princeton (6–3)		46
19	Michigan State (6–3)		30
20	Baylor (8–2)		20
20	Missouri (7–4)		20

== Bowl games ==
=== Major bowls ===
Bowl game	Winning team		Losing team	
Rose Bowl	No. 6 Ohio State	17	No. 3 California	14
Sugar Bowl	No. 2 Oklahoma	35	No. 9 LSU	0
Orange Bowl	No. 15 Santa Clara	21	No. 11 Kentucky	13
Cotton Bowl	No. 5 Rice	27	No. 16 North Carolina	13

=== Other bowls ===
Bowl game	Winning team		Losing team	
Sun Bowl	Texas Western	33	Georgetown	20
Gator Bowl	No. 14 Maryland	20	No. 20 Missouri	7
Tangerine Bowl	Saint Vincent	7	Emory and Henry	6
Raisin Bowl	San Jose State	20	Texas Tech	13
Refrigerator Bowl	Evansville	22	Hillsdale	7
Salad Bowl	Xavier	33	Arizona State	21
Shrine Bowl	Southern Illinois	41	Indiana State	14

== Awards ==
=== Heisman Trophy voting ===
The Heisman Trophy is given to the year's most outstanding player

Player	School	Position	Total
Leon Hart	Notre Dame	E	995
Charlie Justice	North Carolina	HB	272
Doak Walker	SMU	HB	229
Arnold Galiffa	Army	QB	196
Bob Williams	Notre Dame	QB	189
Eddie LeBaron	Pacific (CA)	QB	122
Clayton Tonnemaker	Minnesota	C	81
Emil Sitko	Notre Dame	FB/HB	79

=== All-America team ===
For the year 1949, the NCAA recognizes eight published All-American teams as "official" designations for purposes of its consensus determinations. The following chart identifies the NCAA-recognized consensus All-Americans and displays which first-team designations they received.

Name	Position	School	Number	Official	Other
Leon Hart	End	Notre Dame	8/8	AAB, AP, COL, FWAA, INS, NEA, SN, UP	NYS, PLAY, WC
Emil Sitko	Fullback	Notre Dame	8/8	AAB, AP, COL, FWAA, INS, NEA, SN, UP	NYS, PLAY, WC
Clayton Tonnemaker	Center	Minnesota	7/8	AAB AP, COL, FWAA, NEA, SN, UP	NYS, PLAY, WC
Rod Franz	Guard	California	7/8	AAB, AP, COL, FWAA, INS, SN, UP	NYS, WC
Doak Walker	Halfback	SMU	7/8	AAB, AP, FWAA, INS, NEA, SN, UP	PLAY
Arnold Galiffa	Quarterback	Army	6/8	AP, COL, FWAA, INS, SN, UP	NYS, PLAY, WC
Leo Nomellini	Tackle	Minnesota	6/8	AAB, COL, FWAA, NEA, SN, UP	WC
James Williams	End	Rice	4/8	AAB, AP, COL, FWAA	NYS, PLAY, WC
Alvin Wistert	Tackle	Michigan	4/8	AAB, INS, SN, UP	WC
Ed Bagdon	Guard	Michigan State	4/8	FWAA, NEA, SN, UP	WC
Bob Williams	Quarterback	Notre Dame	4/8	AAB, FWAA, SN, UP	WC
