= Percy Snell =

American football, basketball, and baseball coach (1887–1953)

Biographical details
- Born: 1887
- Died: March 11, 1953; Aurora, Illinois, U.S.

Coaching career (HC unless noted)

Football
- 1926–1938: Aurora

Basketball
- 1926–1932: Aurora
- 1946–1947: Quincy

Baseball
- 1926–1937: Aurora

Head coaching record
- Overall: 36–45–11 (football); 32–62 (basketball); 25–43 (baseball)

Accomplishments and honors

Championships
- Football; 1 Tri-State (1934)

Percy S. Snell (1887 – March 11, 1953) was an American football, basketball, and baseball coach. He served as the head football coach at Aurora University from 1926 to 1938. Snell was also the head basketball coach at Aurora from 1926 to 1932, where he compiled a record of 19–53, and later for one year at Quincy University where his teams went 13–9 during the 1946–47 season. In addition, Snell was the head baseball coach at Aurora from 1926 to 1932, posting a record of 25–43 as that program's first ever coach.

Snell died on March 11, 1953, at his home in Aurora, Illinois. The baseball field that Aurora University played their home games at for nearly 50 years was named in his honor.

== Head coaching record ==
=== Football ===
Year	Team	Overall	Conference	Standing	Bowl/playoffs
Aurora Spartans (Independent) (1926–1933)
1926	Aurora	3–1–1			
1927	Aurora	2–4–1			
1928	Aurora	1–5–1			
1929	Aurora	4–3–1			
1930	Aurora	2–6			
1931	Aurora	4–2–1			
1932	Aurora	1–4–1			
1933	Aurora	5–1–1			
Aurora Spartans (Tri-State Intercollegiate Conference) (1934–1938)
1934	Aurora	5–2–2	3–1	T–1st	
1935	Aurora	3–2–2	3–1–1	T–2nd	
1936	Aurora	4–3	3–1	2nd	
1937	Aurora	2–6	1–3		
1938	Aurora	0–6	0–4		
Aurora:		36–45–11	10–10–1		
Total:		36–45–11			
National championship Conference title Conference division title or championship game berth
