= 1949 Maine Black Bears football team =

American college football season

1949 Maine Black Bears football

Yankee Conference co-champion
- Conference: Yankee Conference, Maine Intercollegiate Athletic Association
- Record: 2–4–1 (2–0–1 Yankee, 0–3 MIAA)
- Head coach: David M. Nelson (1st season)
- Captain: Donald Barron
- Home stadium: Alumni Field

1949 Yankee Conference football standings
	Conf.					Overall
Team	W		L		T	W		L		T
Connecticut +	2	–	0	–	1	4	–	4	–	1
Maine +	2	–	0	–	1	2	–	4	–	1
UMass	1	–	1	–	0	3	–	5	–	0
New Hampshire	1	–	3	–	0	4	–	4	–	0
Rhode Island State	0	–	4	–	0	0	–	8	–	0
Vermont	2	–	0	–	0	6	–	2	–	0
+ – Conference co-champions; Vermont was ineligible for the conference title.

The 1949 Maine Black Bears football team was an American football team that represented the University of Maine as a member of the Yankee Conference and Maine Intercollegiate Athletic Association during the 1949 college football season. In its first season under head coach David M. Nelson, the team compiled a 2–4–1 record (2–0–1 against Yankee Conference and 0–3 against MIAA opponents) and tied with Connecticut for the Yankee championship. The team played its home games at Alumni Field in Orono, Maine. Donald Barron was the team captain.

== Schedule ==
Date	Opponent	Site	Result	Source
September 25	at Rhode Island State	Meade Stadium; Kingston, RI	W 19–7	
October 1	Springfield*	Alumni Field; Orono, ME	L 0–35	
October 8	at New Hampshire	Lewis Field; Durham, NH (rivalry)	W 26–13	
October 15	Connecticut	Alumni Field; Orono, ME	T 12–12	
October 22	at Bates	Garcelon Field; Lewiston, ME	L 0–6	
October 29	at Colby	Seaverns Field; Waterville, ME	L 12–13	
November 5	Bowdoin	Alumni Field; Orono, ME	L 0–18	
*Non-conference game
