= 1951 Bloomsburg Huskies football team =

American college football season

1951 Bloomsburg Huskies football

PSTCC champion
- Conference: Pennsylvania State Teachers College Conference
- Record: 8–0 (7–0 PSTCC)
- Head coach: Robert B. Redman (5th season)
- Home stadium: Crispin Field, Athletic Park

1951 Pennsylvania State Teachers College Conference football standings
| | Conf. | | | | | Overall |
| Team | W | | L | | T | W | | L | | T |
|---|---|---|---|---|---|---|---|---|---|---|
| Bloomsburg $ | 7 | – | 0 | – | 0 | 8 | – | 0 | – | 0 |
| California (PA) | 4 | – | 1 | – | 0 | 7 | – | 2 | – | 0 |
| Clarion | 3 | – | 1 | – | 0 | 4 | – | 2 | – | 1 |
| West Chester | 3 | – | 1 | – | 0 | 8 | – | 2 | – | 0 |
| Kutztown | 3 | – | 2 | – | 0 | 5 | – | 2 | – | 0 |
| Shippensburg | 4 | – | 3 | – | 0 | 5 | – | 3 | – | 0 |
| East Stroudsburg | 2 | – | 2 | – | 0 | 4 | – | 4 | – | 0 |
| Slippery Rock | 1 | – | 2 | – | 0 | 3 | – | 4 | – | 0 |
| Indiana (PA) | 5 | – | 3 | – | 1 | 5 | – | 3 | – | 1 |
| Edinboro | 0 | – | 3 | – | 1 | 0 | – | 5 | – | 1 |
| Mansfield | 1 | – | 4 | – | 0 | 2 | – | 5 | – | 0 |
| Millersville | 3 | – | 5 | – | 0 | 3 | – | 5 | – | 0 |
| Cheyney | 0 | – | 3 | – | 0 | 2 | – | 4 | – | 0 |
| Lock Haven | 0 | – | 6 | – | 0 | 0 | – | 8 | – | 0 |
$ – Conference champion; Conference standings were based on the Saylor system of ratings.

The 1951 Bloomsburg Huskies football team represented Bloomsburg State Teachers College—now known as Bloomsburg University of Pennsylvania—as a member of the Pennsylvania State Teachers College Conference (PSTCC) during the 1951 college football season. Led by Robert B. Redman in his fifth and final season as head coach, the Huskies compiled an overall record of 8–0 with a mark of 7–0 in conference play, winning the PSTCC title.

Redman was selected by the Associated Press (AP) as the teacher college coach of the year. In addition, the following Bloomsburg players were named to the 1951 AP All-Teacher College football team: senior Bob Lang at back (first team); sophomore John Nemetz at tackle (first team); Ardell Ziegenfuse at guard (second team); Tommy Spack at back (second team); Francis Bidelspach at guard (honorable mention); Tom Schukis at center (honorable mention); and George Lambrinos at back (honorable mention).

After the season, three PSTCC schools indicated they would refuse to reschedule Bloomsburg based on its less rigid eligibility rules.

== Schedule ==
| Date | Time | Opponent | Site | Result | Attendance | Source |
|---|---|---|---|---|---|---|
| September 22 | | Mansfield | Crispin Field; Berwick, PA | W 20–7 | 3,000 | |
| September 29 | | Lock Haven | Athletic Park; Bloomsburg, PA | W 35–6 | 1,500 | |
| October 13 | 8:30 p.m. | Millersville | Athletic Park; Bloomsburg, PA | W 40–14 | | |
| October 20 | 2:00 p.m. | Shippensburg^{†} | Athletic Park; Bloomsburg, PA | W 20–7 | | |
| October 27 | | at Kutztown | Kutztown, PA | W 28–0 | 600 | |
| November 3 | | at Wilkes* | Kingston Stadium; Kingston, PA | W 28–0 | | |
| November 10 | 2:00 p.m. | West Chester | Crispin Field; Berwick, PA | W 16–7 | 4,000 | |
| November 17 | 2:00 p.m. | Indiana (PA) | Athletic Park; Bloomsburg, PA | W 20–0 | 2,500 | |
*Non-conference game; ^{†}Homecoming; All times are in Eastern time
