= 1949 South Dakota State Jackrabbits football team =

American college football season

1949 South Dakota State Jackrabbits football

NCC co-champion
- Conference: North Central Conference
- Record: 7–3 (5–2 NCC)
- Head coach: Ralph Ginn (3rd season)

1949 North Central Conference football standings
	Conf.					Overall
Team	W		L		T	W		L		T
Iowa State Teachers +	5	–	1	–	0	5	–	2	–	0
South Dakota State +	5	–	1	–	0	7	–	3	–	0
Morningside	3	–	2	–	1	7	–	3	–	1
North Dakota	3	–	2	–	1	4	–	3	–	1
South Dakota	2	–	2	–	2	2	–	5	–	2
Augustana (SD)	1	–	5	–	0	2	–	6	–	0
North Dakota State	0	–	6	–	0	0	–	9	–	0
+ – Conference co-champions

The 1949 South Dakota State Jackrabbits football team was an American football team that represented South Dakota State University in the North Central Conference (NCC) during the 1949 college football season. In its third season under head coach Ralph Ginn, the team compiled a 7–3 record, tied for the NCC championship, and outscored opponents by a total of 183 to 175.

== Schedule ==
Date	Opponent	Site	Result	Attendance	Source
September 10	St. Cloud Teachers*	Brookings, SD	W 7–0		
September 17	Drake*	Drake Stadium; Des Moines, IA	L 0–40		
September 24	at Morningside	Sioux City, IA	W 27–20		
October 1	Colorado State–Greeley*	Brookings, SD	W 40–13		
October 8	Iowa State Teachers	Brookings, SD	W 14–13		
October 15	at Augustana (SD)	Augustana Stadium; Sioux Falls, SD	W 28–0		
October 22	at North Dakota	Grand Forks, ND	L 0–19		
October 29	at South Dakota^{†}	Brookings, SD (Hobo Day, rivalry)	W 27–25	10,000	
November 4	North Dakota State	Brookings, SD (rivalry)	W 33–13		
November 12	at Bradley*	Peoria Stadium; Peoria, IL	L 7–32		
*Non-conference game; ^{†}Homecoming
