= 1949 Connecticut Huskies football team =

American college football season

1949 Connecticut Huskies football

Yankee Conference co-champion
- Conference: Yankee Conference
- Record: 4–4–1 (2–0–1 Yankee)
- Head coach: J. Orlean Christian (15th season)
- Home stadium: Gardner Dow Athletic Fields

1949 Yankee Conference football standings
	Conf.					Overall
Team	W		L		T	W		L		T
Connecticut +	2	–	0	–	1	4	–	4	–	1
Maine +	2	–	0	–	1	2	–	4	–	1
UMass	1	–	1	–	0	3	–	5	–	0
New Hampshire	1	–	3	–	0	4	–	4	–	0
Rhode Island State	0	–	4	–	0	0	–	8	–	0
Vermont	2	–	0	–	0	6	–	2	–	0
+ – Conference co-champions; Vermont was ineligible for the conference title.

The 1949 Connecticut Huskies football team represented the University of Connecticut as a member of the Yankee Conference during the 1949 college football season. Led by 15th-year head coach J. Orlean Christian, the Huskies compiled an overall record of 4–4–1 with a mark of 2–0–1 in conference play, sharing the Yankee Conference title with Maine.

== Schedule ==
Date	Opponent	Site	Result	Attendance	Source
September 24	at Yale*	Yale Bowl; New Haven, CT	L 0–26	24,006	
October 1	American International*	Gardner Dow Athletic Fields; Storrs, CT	W 14–0		
October 8	Springfield*	Springfield, MA	L 7–26		
October 15	at Maine	Alumni Field; Orono, ME	T 12–12		
October 22	Newport NTS*	Gardner Dow Athletic Fields; Storrs, CT	W 125–0		
October 29	at Kent State*	Memorial Stadium; Kent, OH	L 0–27		
November 5	Rhode Island State	Gardner Dow Athletic Fields; Storrs, CT (rivalry)	W 23–0		
November 12	New Hampshire	Gardner Dow Athletic Fields; Storrs, CT	W 27–7	7,000	
November 19	at Ohio Wesleyan*	Selby Field; Delaware, OH	L 12–43		
*Non-conference game
