= 1949 UMass Redmen football team =

American college football season

1949 UMass Redmen football
- Conference: Yankee Conference
- Record: 3–5 (1–1 Yankee)
- Head coach: Thomas Eck (4th season)
- Home stadium: Alumni Field

1949 Yankee Conference football standings
	Conf.					Overall
Team	W		L		T	W		L		T
Connecticut +	2	–	0	–	1	4	–	4	–	1
Maine +	2	–	0	–	1	2	–	4	–	1
UMass	1	–	1	–	0	3	–	5	–	0
New Hampshire	1	–	3	–	0	4	–	4	–	0
Rhode Island State	0	–	4	–	0	0	–	8	–	0
Vermont	2	–	0	–	0	6	–	2	–	0
+ – Conference co-champions; Vermont was ineligible for the conference title.

The 1949 UMass Redmen football team represented the University of Massachusetts Amherst in the 1949 college football season as a member of the Yankee Conference. The team was coached by Thomas Eck and played its home games at Alumni Field in Amherst, Massachusetts. UMass finished the season with a record of 3–5 overall and 1–1 in conference play.

== Schedule ==
Date	Opponent	Site	Result	Attendance	Source
September 24	vs. Bates*	Boston, MA	W 19–0		
October 1	Norwich*	Alumni Field; Amherst, MA	W 54–0		
October 8	Worcester Tech*	Alumni Field; Amherst, MA	L 6–7		
October 15	Rhode Island State	Alumni Field; Amherst, MA	W 32–19		
October 22	Rochester*	Alumni Field; Amherst, MA	L 20–27		
October 29	at Vermont	Centennial Field; Burlington, VT	L 12–20	5,500	
November 5	Springfield*	Pratt Field; Springfield, MA	L 0–22		
November 12	Tufts*	Alumni Field; Amherst, MA	L 7–27		
*Non-conference game
