= 1949 West Virginia Tech Golden Bears football team =

College football season

1949 West Virginia Tech Golden Bears football

WVIAC champion
- Conference: West Virginia Intercollegiate Athletic Conference
- Record: 8–0–1 (8–0–1 WVIAC)
- Head coach: Herb Royer (1st season)
- Captains: Neal Baisi; Randy Cooper

1949 West Virginia Intercollegiate Athletic Conference football standings
	Conf.					Overall
Team	W		L		T	W		L		T
West Virginia Tech $	8	–	0	–	1	8	–	0	–	1
West Liberty State	4	–	0	–	1	9	–	0	–	1
Morris Harvey	3	–	1	–	0	7	–	2	–	0
Shepherd	4	–	2	–	0	6	–	2	–	0
Concord	4	–	2	–	0	5	–	4	–	0
Salem	1	–	1	–	3	3	–	1	–	3
Fairmont State	2	–	4	–	1	3	–	4	–	1
Potomac State	1	–	3	–	0	2	–	4	–	0
Davis & Elkins	2	–	6	–	0	2	–	6	–	0
West Virginia Wesleyan	1	–	6	–	1	1	–	9	–	1
Glenville State	0	–	6	–	1	0	–	6	–	1
Bethany (WV) *	2	–	1	–	0	2	–	6	–	0
$ – Conference champion; * – Did not qualify for conference standings Ties did not count in conference standings.

The 1949 West Virginia Tech Golden Bears football team was an American football team that represented the West Virginia University Institute of Technology of Beckley, West Virginia, as a member of the West Virginia Intercollegiate Athletic Conference (WVIAC) during the 1949 college football season. In their first year under head coach Herb Royer, the team compiled a 8–0–1 record (8–0–1 against WVIAC teams), won the WVIAC championship, outscored opponents by a total of 243 to 83, and outgained opponents by 2,191 yards to 831 yards. The team was honored 60 years later at the school's homecoming game.

Halfback Randy Cooper scored 114 points. His total of 19 touchdowns led the nation. Cooper also set new WVIAC records for most net rushing yards in a season (1,228), most rushing yards in a game (276 against Potomac), most yards of total offense in a game (286 against Potomac), and most carries in a season (185).

Cooper and guard Neal Baisi were the team co-captains. Halfback Walter Rapko gained 667 yards from scrimmage and scored seven touchdowns. Quarterback John Grossi completed 10 of 17 passes for 201 yards and three touchdowns.

== Schedule ==
Date	Opponent	Site	Result	Attendance	Source
September 23	Shepherd	Montgomery, WV	W 23–6		
September 30	Fairmont State	Montgomery, WV	W 33–7		
October 8	at Glenville State	Glenville, WV	W 33–13		
October 15	Davis & Elkins	Montgomery, WV	W 37–7		
October 21	at Morris Harvey	Charleston, WV	W 13–7		
October 28	West Liberty	Montgomery, WV	T 6–6		
November 5	at Concord	Princeton, WV	W 25–12		
November 11	West Virginia Wesleyan^{†}	Montgomery, WV (Armistice Day)	W 30–12		
November 19	at Potomac State	Keyser, WV	W 43–14		
^{†}Homecoming

== Players ==
West Virginia Tech's football players, based in part on game coverage cited above, included the following:

- Neal Baisi, guard and co-captain, senior
- Ralph Basilio, guard
- Randy Cooper, left halfback and co-captain, senior, Oak Hill, West Virginia
- Chuck Cornell, center, senior
- Clinton Frazier
- John Grossi, quarterback, freshman, Weirton, West Virginia
- Brooks Harris, halfback, junior
- John Hess, end
- Ross Hutchens, tackle
- Joe Jarrell, right halfback
- "Bunky" Johnson, quarterback, freshman, Beckley, West Virginia
- Jim Lively, quarterback, senior
- Quentin Maner, back, freshman, Montgomery, West Virginia
- Bob Presson, fullback, junior, Ansted, West Virginia
- Walt Rapko, halfback, Oak Hill, West Virginia
- Jack Sims, end
- Jim Stover, tackle, Kingston, West Virginia
- Jim Turner, center, freshman, Beckley, West Virginia
- Ray Withrow, fullback, freshman
