= 1949 New Hampshire Wildcats football team =

American college football season

1949 New Hampshire Wildcats football
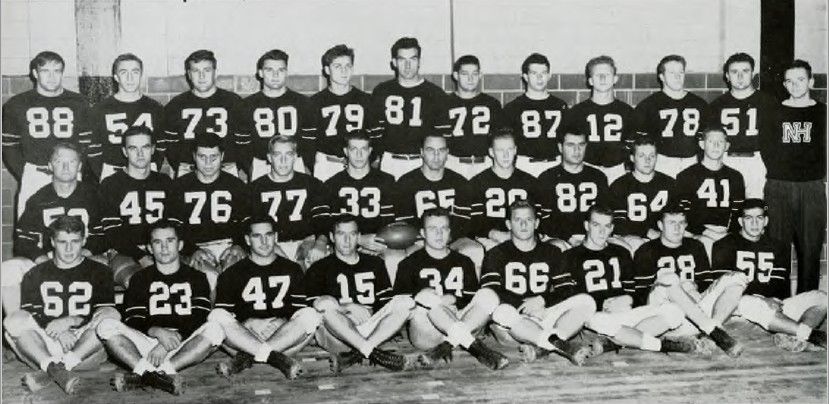
- Conference: Yankee Conference
- Record: 4–4 (1–3 Yankee)
- Head coach: Chief Boston (1st season)
- Captain: Alphie Swekla & Mickey Gage
- Home stadium: Lewis Field

1949 Yankee Conference football standings
	Conf.					Overall
Team	W		L		T	W		L		T
Connecticut +	2	–	0	–	1	4	–	4	–	1
Maine +	2	–	0	–	1	2	–	4	–	1
UMass	1	–	1	–	0	3	–	5	–	0
New Hampshire	1	–	3	–	0	4	–	4	–	0
Rhode Island State	0	–	4	–	0	0	–	8	–	0
Vermont	2	–	0	–	0	6	–	2	–	0
+ – Conference co-champions; Vermont was ineligible for the conference title.

The 1949 New Hampshire Wildcats football team was an American football team that represented the University of New Hampshire as a member of the Yankee Conference during the 1949 college football season. In its first year under head coach Clarence E. "Chief" Boston, the team compiled a 4–4 record (1–3 against conference opponents), scoring and allowing an equal number of points, 153. The team played its home games at Lewis Field (also known as Lewis Stadium) in Durham, New Hampshire.

== Schedule ==
Date	Opponent	Site	Result	Attendance	Source
October 1	at Rhode Island State	Meade Field; Kingston, RI	W 28–20		
October 8	Maine^{†}	Lewis Field; Durham, NH (rivalry)	L 13–26		
October 15	at Springfield*	Pratt Field; Springfield, MA	W 20–7		
October 22	Vermont	Lewis Field; Durham, NH	L 6–13		
October 29	at Northeastern*	Huntington Field; Brookline, MA	W 40–12	4,000	
November 5	Tufts*	Lewis Field; Durham, NH	W 25–0	6,000	
November 12	at Connecticut	Gardner Dow Field; Storrs, CT	L 7–27	7,000	
November 19	Toledo*	Lewis Field; Durham, NH	L 14–48	8,000	
*Non-conference game; ^{†}Homecoming; Source:

After playing Toledo in three consecutive seasons, 1947 to 1949, the two programs did not meet again until 2011.
