= 1948 Bloomsburg Huskies football team =

American college football season

1948 Bloomsburg Huskies football

PSTCC champion
- Conference: Pennsylvania State Teachers College Conference
- Record: 9–0 (6–0 PSTCC)
- Head coach: Robert B. Redman (2nd season)
- Home stadium: Crispin Field, Athletic Park, College Field

1948 Pennsylvania State Teachers College Conference football standings
	Conf.					Overall
Team	W		L		T	W		L		T
Bloomsburg $	6	–	0	–	0	9	–	0	–	0
California (PA)	6	–	0	–	0	6	–	1	–	0
West Chester	3	–	0	–	0	7	–	1	–	0
Slippery Rock	3	–	2	–	0	7	–	2	–	0
Lock Haven	3	–	2	–	0	6	–	4	–	0
East Stroudsburg	3	–	2	–	0	4	–	3	–	1
Shippensburg	4	–	3	–	0	5	–	3	–	0
Clarion	2	–	2	–	0	4	–	4	–	0
Mansfield	3	–	3	–	0	3	–	4	–	1
Millersville	1	–	6	–	0	1	–	7	–	0
Indiana (PA)	1	–	6	–	0	1	–	8	–	0
Kutztown	0	–	4	–	0	3	–	4	–	1
Edinboro	0	–	5	–	0	1	–	7	–	0
$ – Conference champion

The 1948 Bloomsburg Huskies football team represented Bloomsburg State Teachers College—now known as Bloomsburg University of Pennsylvania—as a member of the Pennsylvania State Teachers College Conference (PSTCC) during the 1948 college football season. Led by second-year head coach Robert B. Redman, the Huskies compiled an overall record of 9–0 with a mark of 6–0 in conference play, winning the PSTCC title.

== Schedule ==
Date	Time	Opponent	Site	Result	Attendance	Source
September 18	8:45 p.m.	Wilkes*	Crispin Field; Berwick, PA	W 25–0	5,000	
September 25	8:30 p.m.	Mansfield	Athletic Park; Bloomsburg, PA	W 7–0	4,000	
October 2	9:00 p.m.	at Lock Haven	Lock Haven High School Athletic Field; Lock Haven, PA	W 6–0	4,000	
October 9	8:00 p.m.	King's (PA)*	Athletic Park; Bloomsburg, PA	W 26–0	2,500	
October 16		at Millersville	Glatfelter Field; Columbia, PA	W 20–12	2,000	
October 23	2:00 p.m.	at Shippensburg	Shippensburg, PA	W 13–7		
October 30	2:00 p.m.	Kutztown^{†}	College Field; Bloomsburg, PA	W 27–0	3,000	
November 6	2:00 p.m.	Lycoming*	Athletic Park; Bloomsburg, PA	W 47–0		
November 13		at East Stroudsburg	East Stroudsburg, PA	W 20–0	1,500–2,000	
*Non-conference game; ^{†}Homecoming; All times are in Eastern time
