= 1949 Baker Wildcats football team =

American college football season

1949 Baker Wildcats football

KCAC champion
- Conference: Kansas Collegiate Athletic Conference
- Record: 7–2 (5–1 KCAC)
- Head coach: Karl Spear (4th season)

1949 Kansas Collegiate Athletic Conference football standings
	Conf.					Overall
Team	W		L		T	W		L		T
Baker $	5	–	1	–	0	7	–	2	–	0
Ottawa	4	–	2	–	0	5	–	4	–	0
Bethany (KS)	4	–	2	–	0	5	–	4	–	0
Kansas Wesleyan	3	–	3	–	0	3	–	6	–	0
College of Emporia	3	–	3	–	0	4	–	5	–	0
Bethel (KS)	2	–	4	–	0	3	–	5	–	0
McPherson	0	–	6	–	0	1	–	8	–	0
$ – Conference champion

The 1949 Baker Wildcats football team represented Baker University—as a member of the Kansas Collegiate Athletic Conference (KCAC) during the 1949 college football season. Led by fourth-year head coach Karl Spear, the Wildcats compiled an overall record of 7–2 with a mark of 5–1 in conference play, winning the KCAC title.

== Schedule ==
Date	Time	Opponent	Site	Result	Attendance	Source
September 23		at Southwestern (KS)*	Winfield, KS	W 7–6		
September 30	8:00 p.m.	McPherson	Baldwin City, KS	W 64–0		
October 8	9:00 p.m.	at Bethany (KS)	Lindsborg, KS	L 0–21		
October 14		at College of Emporia	Emporia, KS	W 7–6	2,500	
October 21	8:00 p.m.	Bethel (KS)	Baldwin City, KS	W 23–0		
October 29		William Jewell*	Baldwin City, KS	W 37–7		
November 5		at Kansas Wesleyan	Salina, KS	W 15–6		
November 11	8:00 p.m.	vs. Central (MO)*	C. Y. C. Stadium; Kansas City, MO	L 7–14	3,500	
November 18	8:00 p.m.	Ottawa	Baldwin City, KS	W 14–7	5,000	
*Non-conference game; All times are in Central time
