= Upper Peninsula Conference =

College sports conference, 1948–1958

The Upper Peninsula Conference(sometimes referred to as Upper Peninsula Intercollegiate Athletic Conference) was an intercollegiate athletic conference that existed from 1948-1958. As its name suggests, the league's members were located on the Upper Peninsula of Michigan and one team in northern Wisconsin. The conference held football as a sport for only the first two seasons, while basketball was competed throughout its duration. The conference also hosted events in golf, track & field and tennis.

== Former members ==
Institution	Location	Current conference
Gogebic College	Ironwood, Michigan	National Junior College Athletic Association, Region XIII
Northern Michigan University	Marquette, Michigan	Great Lakes Intercollegiate Athletic Conference
Northland College	Ashland, Wisconsin	Wisconsin Intercollegiate Athletic Conference
Sault Saint Marie Tech currently known as Lake Superior State University	Sault Sainte Marie, Michigan	Great Lakes Intercollegiate Athletic Conference
Suomi College currently known as Finlandia University	Hancock, Michigan	Wisconsin Intercollegiate Athletic Conference

== Football champions ==
- 1949 – Northern Michigan
- 1950 – Northern Michigan

== Basketball champions ==
- 1948–49 – Northland
- 1949–50 – Northern Michigan
- 1950–51 – Northern Michigan
- 1951–52 – Sault Saint Marie Tech
- 1952–53 – Sault Saint Marie Tech
- 1953–54 – Sault Saint Marie Tech
- 1954–55 – Sault Saint Marie Tech
- 1955–56 – Sault Saint Marie Tech
- 1956–57 – Sault Saint Marie Tech
- 1957–58 – Gogebic College

== See also ==
- List of defunct college football conferences
