= 1949 Findlay Oilers football team =

American college football season

1949 Findlay Oilers football

Mid-Ohio champion
- Conference: Mid-Ohio League
- Record: 5–3 (4–0 Mid-Ohio)
- Head coach: Jack Henning (1st season)

1949 Mid-Ohio League football standings
	Conf.					Overall
Team	W		L		T	W		L		T
Findlay $	4	–	0	–	0	5	–	3	–	0
Ashland	3	–	1	–	0	6	–	4	–	0
Cedarville	2	–	2	–	0	3	–	6	–	1
Defiance	1	–	3	–	0	2	–	7	–	0
Bluffton	0	–	4	–	0	0	–	8	–	0
$ – Conference champion

The 1949 Findlay Oilers football team represented Findlay College—now known as the University of Findlay—as a member of the Mid-Ohio League during the 1949 college football season. Led by first-year head coach Jack Henning, the Oilers compiled an overall record of 5–3 with a mark of 4–0, winning the Mid-Ohio League title.

== Schedule ==
Date	Opponent	Site	Result	Attendance	Source
September 24	at Akron*	Rubber Bowl; Akron, OH	L 0–34	5,722	
October 1	at Bluffton	Bluffton, OH	W 35–0		
October 8	Ashland	Findlay, OH	W 28–25		
October 15	Cedarville	Findlay, OH	W 42–0		
October 22	at Heidelberg*	Tiffin, OH	L 14–41		
October 29	at Defiance	Defiance, OH	W 13–6		
November 4	Huntington*	Findlay, OH	W 34–0	1,000	
November 12	Ohio Northern*	Findlay, OH	L 14–29		
*Non-conference game
