= 1955 Kent State Golden Flashes football team =

American college football season

1955 Kent State Golden Flashes football
- Conference: Mid-American Conference
- Record: 6–2–1 (4–1–1 MAC)
- Head coach: Trevor J. Rees (10th season)
- Home stadium: Memorial Stadium

1955 Mid-American Conference football standings
	Conf.					Overall
Team	W		L		T	W		L		T
No. 15 Miami (OH) $	5	–	0	–	0	9	–	0	–	0
Bowling Green	4	–	1	–	1	7	–	1	–	1
Kent State	4	–	1	–	1	6	–	2	–	1
Ohio	3	–	3	–	0	5	–	4	–	0
Toledo	2	–	4	–	0	3	–	5	–	1
Marshall	1	–	5	–	0	3	–	6	–	0
Western Michigan	0	–	5	–	0	1	–	7	–	1
$ – Conference champion; Rankings from AP Poll

The 1955 Kent State Golden Flashes football team was an American football team that represented Kent State University in the Mid-American Conference (MAC) during the 1955 college football season. In their tenth season under head coach Trevor J. Rees, the Golden Flashes compiled a 6–2–1 record (4–1–1 against MAC opponents), finished in third place in the MAC, and outscored all opponents by a combined total of 184 to 87.

The team's statistical leaders included fullback Mike Norcia with 600 rushing yards, Bob Stimac with 428 passing yards, and Ken Redin with 102 receiving yards. Norcia was selected as a first-team All-MAC player.

== Schedule ==
Date	Opponent	Site	Result	Attendance	Source
September 23	Bowling Green	Memorial Stadium; Kent, OH (rivalry)	T 6–6		
October 1	at Dayton*	UD Stadium; Dayton, OH	L 13–26	10,000	
October 7	Baldwin–Wallace*	Memorial Stadium; Kent, OH	W 33–2		
October 15	at Ohio	Peden Stadium; Athens, OH	W 20–14		
October 22	Marshall	Memorial Stadium; Kent, OH	W 39–6		
October 29	Miami (OH)	Memorial Stadium; Kent, OH	L 7–19	11,000	
November 5	at Toledo	Glass Bowl; Toledo, OH	W 27–0		
November 12	Waynesburg*	Memorial Stadium; Kent, OH	W 14–0		
November 19	at Western Michigan	Waldo Stadium; Kalamazoo, MI	W 25–14		
*Non-conference game
