= 1949 North Dakota Fighting Sioux football team =

American college football season

1949 North Dakota Fighting Sioux football
- Conference: North Central Conference
- Record: 4–3–1 (3–2–1 NCC)
- Head coach: Dick Miller (1st season)
- Home stadium: Memorial Stadium

1949 North Central Conference football standings
	Conf.					Overall
Team	W		L		T	W		L		T
Iowa State Teachers +	5	–	1	–	0	5	–	2	–	0
South Dakota State +	5	–	1	–	0	7	–	3	–	0
Morningside	3	–	2	–	1	7	–	3	–	1
North Dakota	3	–	2	–	1	4	–	3	–	1
South Dakota	2	–	2	–	2	2	–	5	–	2
Augustana (SD)	1	–	5	–	0	2	–	6	–	0
North Dakota State	0	–	6	–	0	0	–	9	–	0
+ – Conference co-champions

The 1949 North Dakota Fighting Sioux football team, also known as the Nodaks, was an American football team that represented the University of North Dakota in the North Central Conference (NCC) during the 1949 college football season. In its first and only year under head coach Dick Miller, the team compiled a 4–3–1 record (3–2–1 against NCC opponents), tied for third place out of seven teams in the NCC, and was outscored by a total of 121 to 72. The team played its home games at Memorial Stadium in Grand Forks, North Dakota.

== Schedule ==
Date	Opponent	Site	Result	Source
September 16	Morningside	Memorial Stadium; Grand Forks, ND	L 0–12	
September 23	Moorhead State*	Memorial Stadium; Grand Forks, ND	W 6–0	
October 1	at South Dakota	Vermillion, SD (rivalry)	T 7–7	
October 8	Augustana (SD)	Memorial Stadium; Grand Forks, ND	W 21–0	
October 15	at Iowa State Teachers	Cedar Falls, IA	L 0–40	
October 22	South Dakota State	Memorial Stadium; Grand Forks, ND	W 19–0	
October 29	at North Dakota State	Fargo, ND (rivalry)	W 13–6	
November 12	at Toledo*	Toledo, OH	L 6–56	
*Non-conference game
