= 1955 Toledo Rockets football team =

American college football season

1955 Toledo Rockets football
- Conference: Mid-American Conference
- Record: 3–5–1 (2–4 MAC)
- Head coach: Forrest England (2nd season)
- Home stadium: Glass Bowl

1955 Mid-American Conference football standings
| | Conf. | | | | | Overall |
| Team | W | | L | | T | W | | L | | T |
|---|---|---|---|---|---|---|---|---|---|---|
| No. 15 Miami (OH) $ | 5 | – | 0 | – | 0 | 9 | – | 0 | – | 0 |
| Bowling Green | 4 | – | 1 | – | 1 | 7 | – | 1 | – | 1 |
| Kent State | 4 | – | 1 | – | 1 | 6 | – | 2 | – | 1 |
| Ohio | 3 | – | 3 | – | 0 | 5 | – | 4 | – | 0 |
| Toledo | 2 | – | 4 | – | 0 | 3 | – | 5 | – | 1 |
| Marshall | 1 | – | 5 | – | 0 | 3 | – | 6 | – | 0 |
| Western Michigan | 0 | – | 5 | – | 0 | 1 | – | 7 | – | 1 |
$ – Conference champion; Rankings from AP Poll

The 1955 Toledo Rockets football team was an American football team that represented Toledo University in the Mid-American Conference (MAC) during the 1955 college football season. In their second and final season under head coach Forrest England, the Rockets compiled a 3–5–1 record (2–4 against MAC opponents), finished in fifth place in the MAC, and were outscored by their opponents by a combined total of 213 to 77.

The team's statistical leaders included Sam Tisci with 404 passing yards, Julius Taormina with 449 rushing yards, and Gene Cook with 230 receiving yards.

== Schedule ==
| Date | Opponent | Site | Result |
|---|---|---|---|
| September 17 | Eastern Kentucky* | Glass Bowl; Toledo, OH | T 6–6 |
| September 23 | at Detroit* | University of Detroit Stadium; Detroit, MI | W 12–7 |
| October 1 | Ohio | Glass Bowl; Toledo, OH | L 13–34 |
| October 8 | at Miami (OH) | Miami Field; Oxford, OH | L 0–47 |
| October 15 | Western Michigan | Glass Bowl; Toledo, OH | W 6–0 |
| October 22 | at Bowling Green | University Stadium; Bowling Green, OH (rivalry) | L 0–39 |
| November 5 | Kent State | Glass Bowl; Toledo, OH | L 0–27 |
| November 12 | Marshall | Glass Bowl; Toledo, OH | W 27–13 |
| November 19 | at Louisville* | Parkway Field; Louisville, KY | L 13–33 |
*Non-conference game
