= Robert B. Redman =

Biographical details
- Born: September 6, 1908; Sayre, Pennsylvania, U.S.
- Died: June 9, 1960 (aged 51); East Orange, New Jersey, U.S.

Playing career

Football
- late 1920s: Swarthmore

Coaching career (HC unless noted)

Football
- 1947–1951: Bloomsburg
- 1952–1955: East Orange HS (NJ)

Baseball
- 1953–1956: East Orange HS (NJ)

Head coaching record
- Overall: 38–4 (college football)

Accomplishments and honors

Championships
- 3 PSTCC (1948–1949, 1951)

Robert Brittain Redman (September 6, 1908 – June 9, 1960) was an American football, basketball, and baseball player, coach, and educator. He served as the head football coach at Bloomsburg University of Pennsylvania from 1947 to 1951, compiling a record of 38–4 and winning three Pennsylvania State Teachers College Conference titles (1948, 1949, and 1951). After leaving Bloomsburg, Redman coached football and baseball at East Orange High School in East Orange, New Jersey from 1952 to 1956. He served as the principal there from 1956 until 1960, when he was named superintendent of schools. Before assuming that role, Redman died of a heart attack at the age of 51 on June 9, 1960. Bloomsburg's home football stadium, Robert B. Redman Stadium, was named for the coach when it opened in 1974.

== Head coaching record ==
=== College football ===
Year	Team	Overall	Conference	Standing	Bowl/playoffs
Bloomsburg Huskies (Pennsylvania State Teachers College Conference) (1947–1951)
1947	Bloomsburg	6–2	5–2	4th	
1948	Bloomsburg	9–0	6–0	1st	
1949	Bloomsburg	8–1	6–0	T–1st	
1950	Bloomsburg	7–1	6–1	2nd	
1951	Bloomsburg	8–0	7–0	1st	
Bloomsburg:		38–4	30–3		
Total:		38–4			
National championship Conference title Conference division title or championship game berth
