= 1949 North Dakota State Bison football team =

American college football season

1949 North Dakota State Bison football
- Conference: North Central Conference
- Record: 0–9 (0–6 NCC)
- Head coach: Howard Bliss (2nd season)
- Home stadium: Dacotah Field

1949 North Central Conference football standings
	Conf.					Overall
Team	W		L		T	W		L		T
Iowa State Teachers +	5	–	1	–	0	5	–	2	–	0
South Dakota State +	5	–	1	–	0	7	–	3	–	0
Morningside	3	–	2	–	1	7	–	3	–	1
North Dakota	3	–	2	–	1	4	–	3	–	1
South Dakota	2	–	2	–	2	2	–	5	–	2
Augustana (SD)	1	–	5	–	0	2	–	6	–	0
North Dakota State	0	–	6	–	0	0	–	9	–	0
+ – Conference co-champions

The 1949 North Dakota State Bison football team was an American football team that represented North Dakota Agricultural College (now known as North Dakota State University) in the North Central Conference (NCC) during the 1949 college football season. In its second and final season under head coach Howard Bliss, the team compiled a 0–9 record (0–6 against NCC opponents) and finished in seventh/last place out of seven teams in the NCC. The team played its home games at Dacotah Field in Fargo, North Dakota.

== Schedule ==
Date	Opponent	Site	Result	Attendance	Source
September 17	at Marquette	Marquette Stadium; Milwaukee, WI	L 0–66	14,000	
September 23	Concordia–Moorhead*	Dacotah Field; Fargo, ND	L 6–41		
September 30	Iowa State Teachers	Dacotah Field; Fargo, ND	L 6–27		
October 8	at Morningside	Public Schools Stadium; Sioux City, IA	L 20–39	6,000	
October 14	South Dakota	Dacotah Field; Fargo, ND	L 7–40		
October 22	vs. Montana State*	Glendive, MT	L 7–28		
October 29	North Dakota	Dacotah Field; Fargo, ND (rivalry)	L 6–13	5,500	
November 4	at South Dakota State	State Field; Brookings, SD (rivalry)	L 13–33		
November 11	at Augustana (SD)	Sioux Falls, SD	L 7–13		
*Non-conference game
