= 1955 Western Michigan Broncos football team =

American college football season

1955 Western Michigan Broncos football
- Conference: Mid-American Conference
- Record: 1–7–1 (0–5 MAC)
- Head coach: Jack Petoskey (3rd season)
- MVP: Charles Nidiffer
- Captains: Jim Devine; Jerry Ganzel
- Home stadium: Waldo Stadium

1955 Mid-American Conference football standings
	Conf.					Overall
Team	W		L		T	W		L		T
No. 15 Miami (OH) $	5	–	0	–	0	9	–	0	–	0
Bowling Green	4	–	1	–	1	7	–	1	–	1
Kent State	4	–	1	–	1	6	–	2	–	1
Ohio	3	–	3	–	0	5	–	4	–	0
Toledo	2	–	4	–	0	3	–	5	–	1
Marshall	1	–	5	–	0	3	–	6	–	0
Western Michigan	0	–	5	–	0	1	–	7	–	1
$ – Conference champion; Rankings from AP Poll

The 1955 Western Michigan Broncos football team represented Western Michigan College (renamed Western Michigan University in 1957) in the Mid-American Conference (MAC) during the 1955 college football season. In their third season under head coach Jack Petoskey, the Broncos compiled a 1–7–1 record (0–5 against MAC opponents), finished in seventh place in the MAC, and were outscored by their opponents, 200 to 80. The team played its home games at Waldo Stadium in Kalamazoo, Michigan.

Guard Jim Devine and quarterback Jerry Ganzel were the team captains. Fullback Charles Nidiffer received the team's most outstanding player award.

== Schedule ==
Date	Opponent	Site	Result	Attendance	Source
September 17	Great Lakes Navy*	Waldo Stadium; Kalamazoo, MI	T 13–13		
September 24	at Central Michigan*	Alumni Field; Mount Pleasant, MI (rivalry)	L 13–27		
October 1	Bowling Green	Waldo Stadium; Kalamazoo, MI	L 0–35		
October 8	Marshall	Waldo Stadium; Kalamazoo, MI	L 0–28		
October 15	at Toledo	Glass Bowl; Toledo, OH	L 0–6		
October 22	Washington University*	Waldo Stadium; Kalamazoo, MI	L 14–26	8,000	
November 5	at Ohio	Peden Stadium; Athens, OH	L 14–40		
November 12	Western Reserve*	Waldo Stadium; Kalamazoo, MI	W 13–0		
November 19	Kent State	Waldo Stadium; Kalamazoo, MI	L 14–25		
*Non-conference game
