= 1955 Marshall Thundering Herd football team =

American college football season

1955 Marshall Thundering Herd football
- Conference: Mid-American Conference
- Record: 3–6 (1–5 MAC)
- Head coach: Herb Royer (3rd season)
- Captains: Bob McCollins; Bill Harris
- Home stadium: Fairfield Stadium

1955 Mid-American Conference football standings
| | Conf. | | | | | Overall |
| Team | W | | L | | T | W | | L | | T |
|---|---|---|---|---|---|---|---|---|---|---|
| No. 15 Miami (OH) $ | 5 | – | 0 | – | 0 | 9 | – | 0 | – | 0 |
| Bowling Green | 4 | – | 1 | – | 1 | 7 | – | 1 | – | 1 |
| Kent State | 4 | – | 1 | – | 1 | 6 | – | 2 | – | 1 |
| Ohio | 3 | – | 3 | – | 0 | 5 | – | 4 | – | 0 |
| Toledo | 2 | – | 4 | – | 0 | 3 | – | 5 | – | 1 |
| Marshall | 1 | – | 5 | – | 0 | 3 | – | 6 | – | 0 |
| Western Michigan | 0 | – | 5 | – | 0 | 1 | – | 7 | – | 1 |
$ – Conference champion; Rankings from AP Poll

The 1955 Marshall Thundering Herd football team was an American football team that represented Marshall University in the Mid-American Conference (MAC) during the 1955 college football season. In its third season under head coach Herb Royer, the team compiled a 3–6 record (1–5 against conference opponents) and was outscored by a total of 192 to 159. Henry Hinte and Albie Maier were the team captains. The team played its home games at Fairfield Stadium in Huntington, West Virginia.

== Schedule ==
| Date | Opponent | Site | Result | Source |
|---|---|---|---|---|
| September 24 | at Ohio | Peden Stadium; Athens, OH (rivalry) | L 6–13 | |
| October 1 | at Morris Harvey* | Charleston, WV | W 46–7 | |
| October 8 | at Western Michigan | Waldo Stadium; Kalamazoo, MI | W 28–0 | |
| October 15 | Miami (OH) | Fairfield Stadium; Huntington, WV | L 7–46 | |
| October 22 | at Kent State | Memorial Stadium; Kent, OH | L 6–39 | |
| October 29 | Bowling Green^{†} | Fairfield Stadium; Huntington, WV | L 26–27 | |
| November 5 | Youngstown State* | Fairfield Stadium; Huntington, WV | W 20–12 | |
| November 12 | at Toledo | Glass Bowl; Toledo, OH | L 20–27 | |
| November 19 | Xavier* | Fairfield Stadium; Huntington, WV | L 0–21 | |
*Non-conference game; ^{†}Homecoming
