= 1949 South Dakota Coyotes football team =

American college football season

1949 South Dakota Coyotes football
- Conference: North Central Conference
- Record: 2–5–2 (2–2–2 NCC)
- Head coach: Harry Gamage (12th season)
- Home stadium: Inman Field

1949 North Central Conference football standings
	Conf.					Overall
Team	W		L		T	W		L		T
Iowa State Teachers +	5	–	1	–	0	5	–	2	–	0
South Dakota State +	5	–	1	–	0	7	–	3	–	0
Morningside	3	–	2	–	1	7	–	3	–	1
North Dakota	3	–	2	–	1	4	–	3	–	1
South Dakota	2	–	2	–	2	2	–	5	–	2
Augustana (SD)	1	–	5	–	0	2	–	6	–	0
North Dakota State	0	–	6	–	0	0	–	9	–	0
+ – Conference co-champions

The 1949 South Dakota Coyotes football team was an American football team that represented the University of South Dakota as a member of the North Central Conference (NCC) during the 1949 college football season. In their 12th season under head coach Harry Gamage, the Coyotes compiled a 2–5–2 record (2–2–2 against NCC opponents), finished in fifth place out of seven teams in the NCC, and were outscored by a total of 199 to 163. They played their home games at Inman Field in Vermillion, South Dakota.

== Schedule ==
Date	Opponent	Site	Result	Attendance	Source
September 17	vs. Montana*	Daylis Stadium; Billings, MT	L 13–33	4,500	
September 24	at Nebraska*	Memorial Stadium; Lincoln, NE	L 6–33	27,000	
October 1	North Dakota	Inman Field; Vermillion, SD (Sitting Bull Trophy)	T 7–7		
October 7	at Drake*	Drake Stadium; Des Moines, IA	L 6–48	10,000	
October 14	at North Dakota State	Dacotah Field; Fargo, ND	W 40–7		
October 22	Morningside	Inman Field; Vermillion, SD (Dakota Day)	T 6–6	8,000	
October 29	at South Dakota State	State Field; Brookings, SD (Hobo Day, rivalry)	L 25–27	10,000	
November 5	at Augustana (SD)	Viking Field; Sioux Falls, SD	W 46–17		
November 11	Iowa State Teachers	Inman Field; Vermillion, SD	L 14–21	3,500	
*Non-conference game
