= 1949 Vermont Catamounts football team =

American college football season

1949 Vermont Catamounts football
- Conference: Yankee Conference
- Record: 6–2 (2–0 Yankee)
- Head coach: John C. Evans (7th season)
- Home stadium: Centennial Field

1949 Yankee Conference football standings
	Conf.					Overall
Team	W		L		T	W		L		T
Connecticut +	2	–	0	–	1	4	–	4	–	1
Maine +	2	–	0	–	1	2	–	4	–	1
UMass	1	–	1	–	0	3	–	5	–	0
New Hampshire	1	–	3	–	0	4	–	4	–	0
Rhode Island State	0	–	4	–	0	0	–	8	–	0
Vermont	2	–	0	–	0	6	–	2	–	0
+ – Conference co-champions; Vermont was ineligible for the conference title.

The 1949 Vermont Catamounts football team represented the Vermont Catamounts football team of the University of Vermont during the 1949 college football season. Despite a 2–0 conference record, the league title was awarded to both Connecticut and Maine, who finished with 2–0–1 league records.

== Schedule ==
Date	Opponent	Site	Result	Attendance	Source
September 24	Saint Michael's*	Centennial Field; Burlington, VT	W 7–6	6,000	
October 1	St. Lawrence*	Centennial Field; Burlington, VT	W 21–0	4,000	
October 8	at Union (NY)*	Alexander Field; Schenectady, NY	L 7–26		
October 15	Norwich*	Centennial Field; Burlington, VT	W 20–0	5,500	
October 22	at New Hampshire	Lewis Field; Durham, NH	W 13–6	6,000	
October 29	UMass	Centennial Field; Burlington, VT	W 20–12	5,500	
November 5	at Rochester*	River Field; Rochester, NY	W 14–0	3,000	
November 12	at Middlebury*	Porter Field; Middlebury, VT	L 6–14	7,000	
*Non-conference game
