= Karl Spear =

American football coach and college athletic administrator

Karl E. Spear
Biographical details
- Born: December 15, 1910; Wellington, Kansas, U.S.
- Died: March 11, 1981 (aged 70); Lawrence, Kansas, U.S.

Coaching career (HC unless noted)

Football
- 1946–1962: Baker (football)

Head coaching record
- Overall: 87–61–4

Accomplishments and honors

Championships
- Football; 2 KCAC (1949, 1958)

Karl E. Spear (December 15, 1910 – March 11, 1981) was an American college football coach and athletics administrator. He served as the head football coach at Baker University in Baldwin City, Kansas for 17 seasons, from 1946 to 1962, compiling a record of 87–61–4.

After working as head coach, Spear resigned to become the athletic director of the school. He also coached other sports at Baker, including many years of success as the head golf coach.

Spear died of cancer in 1981.

== Head coaching record ==
=== Football ===
Year	Team	Overall	Conference	Standing	Bowl/playoffs
Baker Wildcats (Kansas Collegiate Athletic Conference) (1946–1962)
1946	Baker	5–3–1	4–1–1	T–2nd	
1947	Baker	5–3–1	4–1–1	2nd	
1948	Baker	4–5	3–3	T–3rd	
1949	Baker	7–2	5–1	1st	
1950	Baker	6–3	5–1	2nd	
1951	Baker	2–7	1–5	6th	
1952	Baker	2–5–1	2–3–1	T–4th	
1953	Baker	4–5	3–4	5th	
1954	Baker	3–6	2–5	6th	
1955	Baker	4–5	4–3	T–4th	
1956	Baker	4–5	3–4	5th	
1957	Baker	6–2–1	5–1–1	2nd	
1958	Baker	8–1	7–0	1st	
1959	Baker	5–4	5–2	3rd	
1960	Baker	8–1	8–1	2nd	
1961	Baker	6–3	6–3	4th	
1962	Baker	8–1	8–1	2nd	
Baker:		87–61–4	75–39–4		
Total:		87–61–4			
National championship Conference title Conference division title or championship game berth
