= Herb Royer =

American football player and coach (1915–2003)

Biographical details
- Born: June 4, 1915
- Died: April 7, 2003 (aged 87); Huntington, West Virginia, U.S.

Playing career

Football
- 1935–1937: Marshall
- Position: Halfback

Coaching career (HC unless noted)

Football
- 1938: Marshall (backfield)
- 1939–1941: Logan HS (WV)
- 1946: Logan HS (WV)
- 1947: Virginia Tech (assistant)
- 1948: Marshall (backfield)
- 1949–1950: West Virginia Tech
- 1951–1952: Logan HS (WV)
- 1953–1958: Marshall

Basketball
- 1939–1942: Logan HS (WV)
- 1946–1947: Logan HS (WV)

Head coaching record
- Overall: 35–34–4 (college football)

Accomplishments and honors

Championships
- 1 WVIAC (1949)

Herbert Henry Royer (June 4, 1915 – April 7, 2003) was an American football coach. He served as was the head football coach at West Virginia University Institute of Technology from 1949 to 1950 and at Marshall University from 1953 to 1958, compiling a career college football head coaching record of 35–34–4.

A native of Loveland, Ohio, Royer lived in Newark, Ohio during his early childhood and then moved to Dunbar, West Virginia, where he completed high school. He attended Emory and Henry College and then Marshall, where played football as a halfback from 1935 to 1937 under head coach Cam Henderson. After graduating from Marshall in 1938, Royer signed with the Detroit Lions of the National Football League (NFL), but ultimately declined to play professional football.

Royer served in the United States Navy during World War II.

== Head coaching record ==
=== College football ===
Year	Team	Overall	Conference	Standing	Bowl/playoffs
West Virginia Tech Golden Bears (West Virginia Intercollegiate Athletic Conference) (1949–1950)
1949	West Virginia Tech	8–0–1	8–0–1	1st	
1950	West Virginia Tech	6–3–1	3–2–1	T–4th	
West Virginia Tech:		14–3–2	11–2–1		
Marshall Thundering Herd (Independent) (1953)
1953	Marshall	2–5–2			
Marshall Thundering Herd (Mid-American Conference) (1954–1958)
1954	Marshall	4–5	2–5	7th	
1955	Marshall	3–6	1–5	6th	
1956	Marshall	3–6	2–4	T–4th	
1957	Marshall	6–3	4–2	3rd	
1958	Marshall	3–6	1–5	7th	
Marshall:		21–31–2	10–21		
Total:		35–34–4			
National championship Conference title Conference division title or championship game berth
