= 1949 College of Emporia Fighting Presbies football team =

American college football season

1949 College of Emporia Fighting Presbies football
- Conference: Kansas Collegiate Athletic Conference
- Record: 4–5 (3–3 KCAC)
- Head coach: Murray Brown (3rd season)
- Home stadium: Schaffner Field

1949 Kansas Collegiate Athletic Conference football standings
	Conf.					Overall
Team	W		L		T	W		L		T
Baker $	5	–	1	–	0	7	–	2	–	0
Ottawa	4	–	2	–	0	5	–	4	–	0
Bethany (KS)	4	–	2	–	0	5	–	4	–	0
Kansas Wesleyan	3	–	3	–	0	3	–	6	–	0
College of Emporia	3	–	3	–	0	4	–	5	–	0
Bethel (KS)	2	–	4	–	0	3	–	5	–	0
McPherson	0	–	6	–	0	1	–	8	–	0
$ – Conference champion

The 1949 College of Emporia Fighting Presbies football team represented the College of Emporia as a member of the Kansas Collegiate Athletic Conference (KCAC) during the 1949 college football season. In their third and final season under head coach Murray Brown, the Presbies compiled an overall record of 4–5 record with a mark of 3–3 in conference play, tying for fifth place in the KCAC.

== Schedule ==
Date	Time	Opponent	Site	Result	Attendance	Source
September 23		Northwest Missouri State*	Emporia, KS	L 0–21		
September 30		at William Jewell*	Liberty, MO	W 20–14		
October 7		at McPherson	McPherson, KS	W 34–0		
October 14		Baker	Emporia, KS	L 6–7	2,500	
October 22		at Bethany (KS)	Lindsborg, KS	L 0–13		
October 28		Kansas Wesleyan	Emporia, KS	L 6–7		
November 4		Bethel (KS)	Emporia, KS	W 42–19		
November 11		at Ottawa (KS)	Ottawa, KS	W 13–7		
November 24	2:00 p.m.	at Missouri Valley*	Gregg-Mitchell Field; Marshall, MO	L 0–62	3,500	
*Non-conference game; All times are in Central time
