= 1955 Bowling Green Falcons football team =

American college football season

1955 Bowling Green Falcons football
- Conference: Mid-American Conference
- Record: 7–1–1 (4–1–1 MAC)
- Head coach: Doyt Perry (1st season)
- MVP: Carlos Jackson
- Captain: Jack Hecker
- Home stadium: University Stadium

1955 Mid-American Conference football standings
	Conf.					Overall
Team	W		L		T	W		L		T
No. 15 Miami (OH) $	5	–	0	–	0	9	–	0	–	0
Bowling Green	4	–	1	–	1	7	–	1	–	1
Kent State	4	–	1	–	1	6	–	2	–	1
Ohio	3	–	3	–	0	5	–	4	–	0
Toledo	2	–	4	–	0	3	–	5	–	1
Marshall	1	–	5	–	0	3	–	6	–	0
Western Michigan	0	–	5	–	0	1	–	7	–	1
$ – Conference champion; Rankings from AP Poll

The 1955 Bowling Green Falcons football team was an American football team that represented Bowling Green State University in the Mid-American Conference (MAC) during the 1955 college football season. In their first season under head coach Doyt Perry, the Falcons compiled a 7–1–1 record (4–1–1 against MAC opponents), shut out five opponents, finished in second place in the MAC, and outscored all opponents by a combined total of 224 to 53. The team's only loss was by a 7–0 score against MAC champion Miami.

Bo Schembechler was an assistant coach on Perry's staff during the 1955 season. Schembechler later said, "I don't believe I can name a coach, anywhere, anytime, anyhow, who did it better than Doyt Perry."

The team's statistical leaders were Jim Bryan with 499 passing yards, Carlos Jackson with 505 rushing yards, and Jack Hecker with 556 receiving yards. Jack Hecker was the team captain. Carlos Jackson received the team's Most Valuable Player award. The team established a team record (later tied by the 1957 team) by allowing only eight touchdowns in the entire season.

== Schedule ==
Date	Opponent	Site	Result	Attendance	Source
September 17	Defiance*	University Stadium; Bowling Green, OH	W 40–0		
September 23	at Kent State	Memorial Stadium; Kent, OH (rivalry)	T 6–6		
October 1	Western Michigan	University Stadium; Bowling Green, OH	W 35–0		
October 8	John Carroll*	University Stadium; Bowling Green, OH	W 30–0		
October 15	at Baldwin–Wallace*	Berea, OH	W 34–14		
October 22	Toledo	University Stadium; Bowling Green, OH (rivalry)	W 39–0		
October 29	at Marshall	Fairfield Stadium; Huntington, WV	W 27–26		
November 5	at No. 13 Miami (OH)	University Stadium; Bowling Green, OH	L 0–7	8,210	
November 12	at Ohio	Peden Stadium; Athens, OH	W 13–0		
*Non-conference game; Rankings from Coaches' Poll released prior to the game
