= 1949 Rhode Island State Rams football team =

American college football season

1949 Rhode Island State Rams football
- Conference: Yankee Conference
- Record: 0–8 (0–4 Yankee)
- Head coach: Bill Beck (5th season)
- Home stadium: Meade Stadium

1949 Yankee Conference football standings
	Conf.					Overall
Team	W		L		T	W		L		T
Connecticut +	2	–	0	–	1	4	–	4	–	1
Maine +	2	–	0	–	1	2	–	4	–	1
UMass	1	–	1	–	0	3	–	5	–	0
New Hampshire	1	–	3	–	0	4	–	4	–	0
Rhode Island State	0	–	4	–	0	0	–	8	–	0
Vermont	2	–	0	–	0	6	–	2	–	0
+ – Conference co-champions; Vermont was ineligible for the conference title.

The 1949 Rhode Island Rams football team was an American football team that represented Rhode Island State College (later renamed the University of Rhode Island) as a member of the Yankee Conference during the 1949 college football season. In its fifth and final season under head coach Bill Beck, the team compiled a 0–8 record (0–4 against conference opponents) and finished in last place in the conference. The team played its home games at Meade Stadium in Kingston, Rhode Island.

== Schedule ==
Date	Opponent	Site	Result
September 24	Maine		L 7–19
October 1	New Hampshire		L 20–28
October 8	at Brown*	Providence, RI (rivalry)	L 0–46
October 15	at Massachusetts		L 19–32
October 22	at Temple*		L 6–47
October 29	Springfield^{†}*		L 13–34
November 5	at Connecticut	Storrs, CT (rivalry)	L 0–23
November 12	Buffalo*		L 7–39
*Non-conference game; ^{†}Homecoming
