= 1955 Ohio Bobcats football team =

American college football season

1955 Ohio Bobcats football
- Conference: Mid-American Conference
- Record: 5–4 (3–3 MAC)
- Head coach: Carroll Widdoes (8th season)
- Home stadium: Peden Stadium

1955 Mid-American Conference football standings
	Conf.					Overall
Team	W		L		T	W		L		T
No. 15 Miami (OH) $	5	–	0	–	0	9	–	0	–	0
Bowling Green	4	–	1	–	1	7	–	1	–	1
Kent State	4	–	1	–	1	6	–	2	–	1
Ohio	3	–	3	–	0	5	–	4	–	0
Toledo	2	–	4	–	0	3	–	5	–	1
Marshall	1	–	5	–	0	3	–	6	–	0
Western Michigan	0	–	5	–	0	1	–	7	–	1
$ – Conference champion; Rankings from AP Poll

The 1955 Ohio Bobcats football team was an American football team that represented Ohio University in the Mid-American Conference (MAC) during the 1955 college football season. In their eighth season under head coach Carroll Widdoes, the Bobcats compiled a 5–4 record (3–3 against MAC opponents), finished in fourth place in the MAC, and outscored all opponents by a combined total of 166 to 134. They played their home games in Peden Stadium in Athens, Ohio.

== Schedule ==
Date	Opponent	Site	Result	Attendance	Source
September 17	at Youngstown State*	Rayen Stadium; Youngstown, OH	W 6–0		
September 24	Marshall	Peden Stadium; Athens, OH (rivalry)	W 13–6		
October 1	at Toledo	Glass Bowl; Toledo, OH	W 40–13		
October 15	Kent State	Peden Stadium; Athens, OH	L 14–20		
October 22	at Miami (OH)	Miami Field; Oxford, OH (rivalry)	L 7–34		
October 29	at Indiana*	Memorial Stadium; Bloomington, IN	L 14–21	18,108	
November 5	Western Michigan	Peden Stadium; Athens, OH	W 40–14		
November 12	Bowling Green	Peden Stadium; Athens, OH	L 0–13		
November 19	Morris Harvey*	Peden Stadium; Athens, OH	W 32–13		
*Non-conference game
