= 1955 Miami Redskins football team =

American college football season

1955 Miami Redskins football

MAC champion
- Conference: Mid-American Conference

Ranking
- Coaches: No. 20
- AP: No. 15
- Record: 9–0 (5–0 MAC)
- Head coach: Ara Parseghian (5th season)
- Captain: Dick Mattern
- Home stadium: Miami Field

1955 Mid-American Conference football standings
	Conf.					Overall
Team	W		L		T	W		L		T
No. 15 Miami (OH) $	5	–	0	–	0	9	–	0	–	0
Bowling Green	4	–	1	–	1	7	–	1	–	1
Kent State	4	–	1	–	1	6	–	2	–	1
Ohio	3	–	3	–	0	5	–	4	–	0
Toledo	2	–	4	–	0	3	–	5	–	1
Marshall	1	–	5	–	0	3	–	6	–	0
Western Michigan	0	–	5	–	0	1	–	7	–	1
$ – Conference champion; Rankings from AP Poll

The 1955 Miami Redskins football team was an American football team that represented Miami University in the Mid-American Conference (MAC) during the 1955 college football season. In their fifth and final season under head coach Ara Parseghian, the Redskins compiled a perfect 9–0 record (5–0 against MAC opponents), won the MAC championship, and outscored opponents by a combined total of 226 to 47. The defense allowed only 5.2 points per game, which remains a Miami school record. It was Miami's first undefeated, untied season since 1921.

Dick Mattern was the team captain. The team's statistical leaders included Tirrel Burton with 722 yards, Tom Dimitroff with 579 passing yards, and Presby Bliss with 218 receiving yards. Burton averaged 8.8 yards per carry, which remains a Miami school record. Burton also led the 1955 Miami team in scoring (84 points), pass interceptions (four), and punt returns (14 for 216 yards).

Bo Schembechler was an assistant coach on the team.

== Schedule ==
Date	Opponent	Rank	Site	Result	Attendance	Source
September 24	at Northwestern*		Dyche Stadium; Evanston, IL	W 25–14	35,000	
October 1	Xavier*		Miami Field; Oxford, OH	W 13–12	9,465	
October 8	Toledo		Miami Field; Oxford, OH	W 47–0	8,000	
October 15	at Marshall		Fairfield Stadium; Huntington, WV	W 46–7		
October 22	Ohio^{†}		Miami Field; Oxford, OH (rivalry)	W 34–7	13,500	
October 29	at Kent State	No. 18	Memorial Stadium; Kent, OH	W 19–7	11,000	
November 5	Bowling Green	No. 13	Miami Field; Oxford, OH	W 7–0	8,210	
November 12	at Dayton	No. 15	University of Dayton Stadium; Dayton, OH	W 21–0	11,932	
November 24	at Cincinnati*	No. 16	Nippert Stadium; Cincinnati, OH (Victory Bell)	W 14–0	25,000	
*Non-conference game; ^{†}Homecoming; Rankings from AP Poll released prior to the game
