= 1949 Iowa State Teachers Panthers football team =

American college football season

1949 Iowa State Teachers Panthers football

NCC co-champion
- Conference: North Central Conference
- Record: 5–2 (5–1 NCC)
- Head coach: Clyde Starbeck (12th season)
- Home stadium: O. R. Latham Stadium

1949 North Central Conference football standings
	Conf.					Overall
Team	W		L		T	W		L		T
Iowa State Teachers +	5	–	1	–	0	5	–	2	–	0
South Dakota State +	5	–	1	–	0	7	–	3	–	0
Morningside	3	–	2	–	1	7	–	3	–	1
North Dakota	3	–	2	–	1	4	–	3	–	1
South Dakota	2	–	2	–	2	2	–	5	–	2
Augustana (SD)	1	–	5	–	0	2	–	6	–	0
North Dakota State	0	–	6	–	0	0	–	9	–	0
+ – Conference co-champions

The 1949 Iowa State Teachers Panthers football team represented Iowa State Teachers College in the North Central Conference during the 1949 college football season. In its 12th season under head coach Clyde Starbeck, the team compiled a 5–2 record (5–1 against NCC opponents) and tied for the conference championship.

Seven players were named to the all-conference team: halfbacks Chuck Cacek and Paul DeVan; tackles Stanley Brown, Robert Orgren, and Lee Wachenheim; center Don Abney; and guard Bob Miller.

== Schedule ==
Date	Opponent	Site	Result	Attendance	Source
September 24	at Western Michigan*	Waldo Stadium; Kalamazoo, MI	L 6–20		
September 30	at North Dakota State	Dacotah Field; Fargo, ND	W 27–6		
October 8	at South Dakota State	Brookings, SD	L 13–14		
October 15	North Dakota	O. R. Latham Stadium; Cedar Falls, IA	W 40–0		
October 22	Augustana (SD)	O. R. Latham Stadium; Cedar Falls, IA	W 49–0		
October 29	Morningside	O. R. Latham Stadium; Cedar Falls, IA	W 30–10		
November 11	at South Dakota	Vermillion, SD	W 21–14	3,500	
*Non-conference game
