= Rudy Gaddini =

American football player and coach

Biographical details
- Born: c. 1934

Playing career

Football
- 1955–1956: Michigan State
- Positions: Halfback, fullback

Coaching career (HC unless noted)

Football
- 1957: Cathedral Boys HS (IL)
- 1959–1963: Fenwick HS (IL) (assistant)
- 1964–1965: Nebraska (GA)
- 1966–1967: General Beadle State (backfield)
- 1968–1969: Wisconsin–Oshkosh (backfield)
- 1970–1981: Milton
- 1984: Wisconsin–River Falls (assistant)

Wrestling
- 1966–1967: General Beadle State
- 1969–1970: Wisconsin–Oshkosh (assistant)

Head coaching record
- Overall: 61–43–5 (college football)

Accomplishments and honors

Championships
- 6 IBFC (1975–1976, 1978–1981)

Rudy Gaddini (born c. 1934) is an American former football coach. He served as the head football coach and Milton College in Milton, Wisconsin from 1970 to 1981, compiling a record of 61–43–5. A native of Chicago, Gaddini attended Fenwick High School in Oak Park, Illinois, where he played high school football and was an all-state fullback. He moved on to Michigan State University, where played college football for the Spartans in 1955 and 1956.

== Head coaching record ==
=== College football ===
Year	Team	Overall	Conference	Standing	Bowl/playoffs	NAIA^{#}
Milton Wildcats (Gateway Conference) (1970–1974)
1970	Milton	0–7–1	0–4	5th		
1971	Milton	5–4	2–1	2nd		
1972	Milton	4–5–1	0–2–1	4th		
1973	Milton	3–5	1–2	3rd		
1974	Milton	5–4	1–2	T–3rd		
Milton Wildcats (Illini–Badger Football Conference) (1975–1981)
1975	Milton	9–0		1st		6
1976	Milton	7–2	4–0	1st		14
1977	Milton	6–4	3–1	2nd		
1978	Milton	7–2	4–0	1st		19
1979	Milton	6–2–1	3–1	T–1st		
1980	Milton	5–3–1	4–0–1	1st		
1981	Milton	4–5–1	3–1–1	T–1st		
Milton:		61–43–5				
Total:		61–43–5				
National championship Conference title Conference division title or championship game berth
^{#}Rankings from NAIA Division II poll.
