= Badger-Illini Conference =

American intercollegiate athletic conference

The Badger-Illini Conference (known as the Tri-State Intercollegiate Conference from 1932 to 1939 and the Badger State Conference or Badger State Intercollegiate Conference from 1940 to 1947) was an intercollegiate athletic conference that existed from 1932 to 1956. It had members in the states of Illinois, Iowa, and Wisconsin. After the departure of certain members in 1956, the league subsequently became the Badger-Gopher Conference.

== Football champions ==
=== Tri-State Intercollegiate Conference (1932–1939) ===
- 1932 – Wisconsin Mines
- 1933 – Milton, Wisconsin Mines, and Northwestern (WI)
- 1934 – Aurora and Wartburg
- 1935 – Milton
- 1936 – Wisconsin Mines
- 1937 – Northwestern (WI)
- 1938 – Northwestern (WI)
- 1939 – Milton

=== Badger State Intercollegiate Conference (1940–1947) ===
- 1940 – Mission House and Wisconsin Tech
- 1941 – Mission House and Northwestern (WI)
- 1942 – Milton, Northwestern (WI), and Wisconsin Tech
- 1943 – No champion
- 1944 – No champion
- 1945 – No champion
- 1946 – Northwestern (WI)
- 1947 – Mission House and Northwestern (WI)

=== Badger-Illini Conference (1948–1956) ===
- 1948 – Lewis (IL) and Northwestern (WI)
- 1949 – Lewis (IL)
- 1950 – Mission House
- 1951 – Northwestern (WI)
- 1952 – Northwestern (WI)
- 1953 – Northwestern (WI)
- 1954 – Northwestern (WI)
- 1955 – Mission House and Northwestern (WI)
- 1956 – Milton
