= Milton Wildcats football =

- First season: 1899
- Last season: 1981
- Location: Milton, Wisconsin
- All-time record: 194–207–18 (.484)
- Conference titles: 9
- Consensus All-Americans: 7

The Milton Wildcats football program represented Milton College in college football. Milton fielded its first football team in 1899 and its last in 1981 before the school closed in 1982. No teams were fielded from 1904 to 1915 and from 1943 to 1945. During this time, the college produced seven All-Americans and nine conference titles, in 1935, 1956, 1961, 1964, 1975, 1976, 1978, 1980, and 1981. The Wildcats played in 419 games during this time with a record of 194–207–18. The program was a member of the Illini–Badger Football Conference from 1975 to 1982.

Milton's final head coach was Rudy Gaddini, who helmed the team from 1970 to 1981, compiling a record of 61–43–5. Two of Gaddini's players at Milton, Dave Kraayeveld and Dave Krieg, went on to play professionally in the National Football League (NFL).
