= Larry Siemering =

American football player and coach (1910–2009)

Biographical details
- Born: November 24, 1910; San Francisco, California, U.S.
- Died: July 27, 2009 (aged 98); Watsonville, California, U.S.

Playing career

Football
- 1933–1934: San Francisco
- 1935–1936: Boston Redskins
- Position: Center

Coaching career (HC unless noted)

Football
- 1937–1939: Manteca HS (CA)
- 1940: Lodi HS (CA)
- 1941: Stockton
- 1942–1946: Pacific (CA) (assistant)
- 1947–1950: Pacific (CA)
- 1951: Arizona State
- 1953: Washington Redskins (OL)
- 1954: Calgary Stampeders
- 1956–1958: Santa Cruz HS (CA)
- 1959–1965: Cabrillo

Baseball
- 1945: Pacific (CA)

Head coaching record
- Overall: 41–8–4 (college football)
- Bowls: 2–0–1

Accomplishments and honors

Championships
- Football; 1 CCAA (1947)

Awards
- Third-team All-American (1933); 2× First-team All-PCC (1933, 1934)

Lawrence Edwin Siemering (November 24, 1910 – July 27, 2009) was an American football player and coach. He played college football at the University of San Francisco and professionally in the National Football League (NFL) with the Boston Redskins in 1935 and 1936. Siemering served as the head football coach at the University of the Pacific in Stockton, California from 1947 to 1951 and at Arizona State University in 1951, compiling a career college football coached record of 41–8–4. He also was the head coach of the Canadian Football League's Calgary Stampeders in 1954. In all, Siemering's football career as a player and coach lasted more than forty years. At the time of his death, he was the oldest surviving professional football player at 98 years of age.

== Early life ==
Siemering was born in San Francisco and was raised in Lodi, California, where he attended and played high school football at Lodi High School. During his senior season as a center, the Lodi Flames went undefeated. He graduated in 1928. Also during this time, Siemering played semi-pro baseball for the Sacramento Stallions.

== Playing career ==
=== College ===
After high school, Siemering accepted a baseball scholarship from the University of San Francisco, where he then also played football. He graduated in 1935.

=== Professional ===
After his college career, Siemering played center in the National Football League for the Boston Redskins in 1935 and 1936; the Redskins moved to Washington, D.C. in 1937. During his tenure there, he played in the 1936 NFL Championship, a loss to the Green Bay Packers.

== Coaching career ==
=== High school ===
After his playing career, Siemering started his coaching career as a high school football coach at Manteca High School and Stockton High School in the San Joaquin Valley. In 1943, his Stockton team went undefeated. Siemering then came back to high school coaching in 1956 at Santa Cruz High School, where he went 9–0 in 1958.

=== College ===
Siemering started his college coaching career as an assistant coach at the College of the Pacific—now known as the University of the Pacific—in Stockton, California under head coach Amos Alonzo Stagg. Stagg retired after the 1946 season, and Siemering took over as head coach in 1947. During his first season as coach, the 1947 Pacific Tigers football team went 10–1, the lone loss against Santa Clara, 21–20. At the end of the regular season, the Tigers played in the Raisin Bowl and beat Wichita, 28–14.

Siemering had another winning record in 1948 and went 7–3–1. However, he is best known for his 1949 Pacific team that went an undefeated at 11–0. The team came close to losing only once in 1949, when it defeated San Francisco in the first game of the season, 7–6. The Tigers outscored their opponents 575–66, led the nation in offense, and were ranked as high as tenth in the AP Poll. During the season, the Tigers scored 75 points or more three times, winning 75–20 over Portland, 88–0 over Cal Poly, and 75–0 over the Hawaii. The team was the 15th college team in history to score 500 or more points in a single season.

During his four-year tenure at Pacific, Siemering went 35–5–3 with a .849 winning percentage, the best of any head coach in program history. He then coached at Arizona State University in 1951, where he went 6–3–1. Despite the winning record, he was fired after using an ineligible player who used a fake name.

After a brief second stint in high school teaching, Siemering then became the inaugural head coach of Cabrillo College, a two-year community college in Aptos, California. He coached there from 1959 to 1965. While at Cabrillo, he also coached the Seahawks' golf team until 1976. Siemering was inducted into the first class of the University of the Pacific Athletic Hall of Fame in 1982. His 1947 and 1949 teams were inducted later.

=== Professional ===
In 1953, Siemering was an offensive line coach for the Washington Redskins, under head coach Curly Lambeau. He then left the NFL in 1954 to become the head coach of the Calgary Stampeders in the Canadian Football League.

== Personal life ==
Siemering was married to Sophie Siemering, who died in 2001. On July 27, 2009, he died at Watsonville Community Hospital after a fall at his Watsonville, California home.

== Head coaching record ==
=== College football ===
Year	Team	Overall	Conference	Standing	Bowl/playoffs	AP^{#}
Pacific Tigers (California Collegiate Athletic Association) (1947–1948)
1947	Pacific	10–1	5–0	1st	W Grape, W Raisin	
1948	Pacific	7–1–2	4–1	2nd	T Grape	
Pacific Tigers (Independent) (1949–1950)
1949	Pacific	11–0				10
1950	Pacific	7–3–1				
Pacific:		35–5–3	9–1			
Arizona State Sun Devils (Border Conference) (1951)
1951	Arizona State	6–3–1	4–1	T–2nd		
Arizona State:		6–3–1	4–1			
Total:		41–8–4				
National championship Conference title Conference division title or championship game berth
^{#}Rankings from final AP Poll.

=== Junior college ===
Year	Team	Overall	Conference	Standing	Bowl/playoffs
Stockton Mustangs (Independent) (1941)
1941	Stockton				
Stockton:					
Cabrillo Seahawks (Independent) (1959)
1959	Cabrillo	2–6			
Cabrillo Seahawks (Coast Conference) (1960–1965)
1960	Cabrillo	3–6	1–5	6th	
1961	Cabrillo	1–8	1–6	T–7th	
1962	Cabrillo	5–4	3–2	3rd	
1963	Cabrillo	5–2–2	4–1	2nd	
1964	Cabrillo	3–6	2–3	4th	
1965	Cabrillo	4–5	4–2	T–2nd	
Cabrillo:		23–37–2	15–19		
Total:					
