= 1949 Raisin Bowl =

The 1949 Raisin Bowl may refer to:

- 1949 Raisin Bowl (January) - January 1, 1949, game between the Occidental Tigers and Colorado A&M Aggies (now Colorado State Rams).
- 1949 Raisin Bowl (December) - December 31, 1949, game between the Texas Tech Red Raiders and San Jose State Spartans.
