= 1949 Nebraska Cornhuskers football team =

American college football season

1949 Nebraska Cornhuskers football
- Conference: Big Seven Conference
- Record: 4–5 (3–3 Big 7)
- Head coach: Bill Glassford (1st season)
- Offensive scheme: T formation
- Home stadium: Memorial Stadium

1949 Big Seven Conference football standings
	Conf.					Overall
Team	W		L		T	W		L		T
No. 2 Oklahoma $	5	–	0	–	0	11	–	0	–	0
No. 20 Missouri	5	–	1	–	0	7	–	4	–	0
Iowa State	3	–	3	–	0	5	–	3	–	1
Nebraska	3	–	3	–	0	4	–	5	–	0
Kansas	2	–	4	–	0	5	–	5	–	0
Colorado	1	–	4	–	0	3	–	7	–	0
Kansas State	1	–	5	–	0	2	–	8	–	0
$ – Conference champion; Rankings from AP Poll

The 1949 Nebraska Cornhuskers football team was the representative of the University of Nebraska and member of the Big 7 Conference in the 1949 college football season. The team was coached by Bill Glassford and played their home games at Memorial Stadium in Lincoln, Nebraska.

== Before the season ==
Stepping up to fill the role of head football coach at Nebraska, Bill Glassford was the fifth to fill the role within the same decade, a period wrought with social change and economic recovery following World War II, and in which the fortunes of Cornhusker football had taken a serious downturn. Nebraska had now put together eight straight losing seasons, prior to which the program had not ever suffered even two consecutive losing seasons. Coach Glassford held over a couple of assistants from the 1948 staff and set to work in his attempt to restore Nebraska football to prominence.

== Schedule ==
Date	Time	Opponent	Site	Result	Attendance	Source
September 24	2:00 pm	South Dakota*	Memorial Stadium; Lincoln, NE	W 33–6	27,000	
October 1	2:00 pm	Minnesota*	Memorial Stadium; Lincoln, NE (rivalry)	L 6–28	34,000	
October 8	2:00 pm	at Kansas State	Memorial Stadium; Manhattan, KS (rivalry)	W 13–6	17,000	
October 15	1:00 pm	at Penn State*	New Beaver Field; State College, PA	L 7–22	23,600	
October 22	2:00 pm	No. 4 Oklahoma	Memorial Stadium; Lincoln, NE (rivalry)	L 0–48	39,000	
October 29	2:00 pm	at No. 16 Missouri	Faurot Field; Columbia, MO (rivalry)	L 20–21		
November 5	2:00 pm	Kansas^{†}	Memorial Stadium; Lincoln, NE (rivalry)	L 13–27	36,500	
November 12	2:00 pm	at Iowa State	Clyde Williams Field; Ames, IA (rivalry)	W 7–0	13,558	
November 19	2:00 pm	Colorado	Memorial Stadium; Lincoln, NE (rivalry)	W 25–14	32,000	
*Non-conference game; ^{†}Homecoming; Rankings from AP Poll released prior to the game

== Roster ==
Official Roster
28 Adduci, Nick FB; 27 Adle, Virgil T; 13 Bauer, Arthur G; 25 Bloom, Don HB; 31 Britt, Ted T; 35 Busch, Tracy E; 19 Clark, Ron HB; 21 Damkroger, Ralph E; 29 DiBiase, Michael G; Dorn, Harold HB; 33 Ferguson, Gerald HB; 14 Fischer, Kenneth HB; 38 Godfrey, James T; 45 Goeglein, Richard T; 64 Goracke, Clarence HB; 43 Hawkins, Fred G; 30 Hoy, Rex G; 34 Jones, Philip HB; 49 Magsamen, Raymond E; 24 Maxe, Bill E; 62 McGill, Joe C; 48 Means, Arden G; 15 Meginnis, Harry HB; 50 Meyer, Frank HB; 39 Minnick, Donald T	23 Mueller, William HB; 17 Mullen, Robert C; 20 Nagle, Fran QB; 52 Newton, Dean E; 37 Novak, Richard E; 60 Novak, Tom C; 40 Pedersen, Donald G; 53 Pepler, Albert G; 26 Ponsiego, Joe HB; 57 Rector, Harley T; 47 Reese, Herbert T; 54 Regier, Dick E; 44 Ritter, Roger HB; 18 Salestrom, Darwin G; Schleiger, Robert E; 36 Schneider, Bob E; 51 Simon, Frank E; 16 Spellman, Walt G; 42 Strasheim, Don HB; 41 Toogood, Charles T; 59 Vestal, Maxey E; 32 Voils, Cecil E; 61 Wiegand, Delbert QB; 12 Yost, Richard FB

== Coaching staff ==
Name	Title	First year in this position	Years at Nebraska	Alma mater
Bill Glassford	Head coach	1949	1949–1955	Pittsburgh
L. F. "Pop" Klein	Assistant coach	1945	1945–1958	
Ike Hanscomb	Freshman Coach	1948	1948–1953	
Bob Davis	Backfield Coach	1949	1949–1955	
Peter Janetos		1949	1949–1952	
Marvin Franklin	Ends Coach	1949	1949–1951	Vanderbilt
Jimmy DeAngelis	Line Coach	1949	1949	Yale

== Game summaries ==
=== South Dakota ===
Team	1	2	Total
South Dakota			6
• Nebraska			33

- Date: September 24
- Location: Memorial Stadium • Lincoln, Nebraska
- Game attendance: 27,000

The Glassford era opened with a win at memorial Stadium, though the foe was lowly South Dakota. The Coyotes had never really threatened Nebraska since their lone win in the 13-game series, from 1899. Still, as the Cornhuskers had now been struggling to succeed for years, the win was nice to get.

=== Minnesota ===
Team	1	2	Total
• Minnesota			28
Nebraska			6

- Date: October 1
- Location: Memorial Stadium • Lincoln, Nebraska
- Game attendance: 34,000

The university's yearbook described the Cornhuskers' style of play as "savage", and unlike any performances seen in Memorial Stadium for a decade. Despite the effort, Minnesota extended their domination of Nebraska yet another year, this being their tenth straight win in the series, and improved to 25–4–2 over Nebraska all-time. The Golden Gophers went on to finish the season 7–2 and ranked #8.

=== Kansas State ===
Team	1	2	Total
• Nebraska			13
Kansas State			6

- Date: October 8
- Location: Memorial Stadium • Manhattan, Kansas
- Game attendance: 17,000

Kansas State, lately a perennial easy-win game for Nebraska, failed to simply roll over as expected when Nebraska came calling in Manhattan. The contest started off suggesting a rout, as the first play of the game was a full-field 100-yard kickoff return for a touchdown to put the Cornhuskers up immediately. Thereafter, both teams struggled to make any headway until near the end of the first half, when another Cornhusker touchdown was put on the board. The Wildcats fought bravely in the second half but only came up with a single touchdown, which extended their losing streak against Nebraska to seven straight as they fell to 4–27–2 against the Cornhuskers.

=== Penn State ===
Team	1	2	Total
Nebraska			7
• Penn State			22

- Date: October 15
- Location: New Beaver Field • State College, Pennsylvania
- Game attendance: 23,600

Nebraska and Penn State met for only their second game to date, following a 0–20 loss to the Nittany Lions from 1920. Once again in State College, Penn State defeated the Cornhuskers and owned the day except for one 82-yard Nebraska punt return. The Cornhuskers returned to Lincoln winless in both tries of the series. This was the 150th Nebraska football loss in the history of the program.

=== Oklahoma ===
Team	1	2	Total
• #4 Oklahoma			48
Nebraska			0

- Date: October 22
- Location: Memorial Stadium • Lincoln, Nebraska
- Game attendance: 39,000

Nebraska entered the fray with visiting Oklahoma, having won their first conference contest and still 2–2 on the season. The stadium was near capacity to see how the Cornhuskers would fare against the #4 Sooners. Undaunted, Nebraska fought Oklahoma to a first-quarter draw and seemed poised to score when an interception turned the tide. Oklahoma converted the turnover into points and then never looked back, handing the Cornhuskers a demoralizing 0–48 home field defeat. It was the worst-ever loss handed to Nebraska at Memorial Stadium, and the largest margin of defeat since a 0–54 loss to Indiana in 1944. It was Oklahoma's seventh straight win over Nebraska, setting a new single-team losing streak record, formerly held by Pittsburgh when the Panthers held Nebraska down six times in a row through the 1939 season. The series lead held by the Cornhuskers slipped to 16–9–3. Oklahoma went on to take the Big 7 title, finished 10–0 on the season, and ended with a #2 ranking by the AP Poll.

=== Missouri ===
Team	1	2	Total
Nebraska			20
• #16 Missouri			21

- Date: October 29
- Location: Faurot Field • Columbia, Missouri

Missouri struck first with an early touchdown, but Nebraska fought back and was leading 13–7 by the half. It seemed like the Cornhuskers might have turned the corner and had victory in their grasp as they scored again and led 20–7 by the end of the 3rd quarter. The Tigers brought the battle back at Nebraska to draw within six points, and only four plays later scored again and converted the point after, which ultimately decided the outcome. Missouri had now taken five straight against the Cornhuskers, closing the series to 15–24–3. By the close of the season, Missouri managed a 7–3 record, which was good enough for a #20 ranking by the AP Poll.

=== Kansas ===
Team	1	2	Total
• Kansas			27
Nebraska			13

- Date: November 5
- Location: Memorial Stadium • Lincoln, Nebraska
- Game attendance: 36,500

Any hope Nebraska had of taking a win from this contest was washed away by the five Cornhusker turnovers lost inside of the Kansas 13-yard line. Nebraska had started with a 7–0 lead before the blunders, fueling a hope for victory before the game got away and Kansas notched their third straight victory in the series. It was another homecoming heartbreak in Lincioln, but the Cornhuskers still held a 40–12–3 edge in the series.

=== Iowa State ===
Team	1	2	3	4	Total
• Nebraska	0	0	0	7	7
Iowa State	0	0	0	0	0

- Date: November 12
- Location: Clyde Williams Field, Ames, Iowa
- Game attendance: 13,558
- Game weather: Cold, rain

A 70-yard punt return for a Nebraska touchdown in the final quarter prevented the contest from ending in a scoreless tie. The victory was the fourth in a row for the Cornhuskers in this series, but only the third of the 1949 season. Nebraska improved to 34–8–1 over the Cyclones all-time.

=== Colorado ===
Team	1	2	Total
Colorado			14
• Nebraska			25

- Date: November 19
- Location: Memorial Stadium • Lincoln, Nebraska
- Game attendance: 32,000

The Buffaloes arrived in Lincoln to close out the conference slate for the year, facing a Nebraska team with only two victories all season. Determined to not once again settle for only two wins on the season, Nebraska fought back from an initial 0–7 deficit to pull ahead and keep the lead long enough to end the season with three victories. Nebraska now led Colorado 6–2 in their shared history.

== After the season ==
Although Nebraska ended with a losing record of 4–5, it marked the most wins since the 1941 season, which also ended at 4–5. The 1949 conference record of 3–3 was the first non-losing league season since 1941 as well. Coach Glassford's initial year was still seen as a success under the circumstances, but Nebraskans remained stunned by the decade of the 1940s, which had brought unprecedented disappointments to the football program. Nebraska was now 320–153–31 (.666) overall, and 123–40–11 (.739) against conference opponents. Looking ahead to 1950 and the future, it remained to be seen if Coach Glassford was the one who could bring a brighter future for Nebraska football.

== Future NFL and other professional league players ==
- Nick Adduci, Washington Redskins
