= 1949 Portland Pilots football team =

American college football season

1949 Portland Pilots football
- Conference: Independent
- Record: 3–5
- Head coach: Harry Wright (1st season)
- Home stadium: Multnomah Stadium, Vaughn Street Park

1949 Western college football independents records
	Conf.			Overall
Team	W	L	T	W		L		T
No. 10 Pacific (CA)		–		11	–	0	–	0
Oregon College		–		9	–	0	–	0
No. 15 Santa Clara		–		8	–	2	–	1
San Francisco		–		7	–	3	–	0
Idaho State		–		6	–	2	–	1
Hawaii		–		6	–	3	–	0
La Verne		–		5	–	3	–	2
Loyola (CA)		–		6	–	4	–	0
Nevada		–		5	–	5	–	0
Pepperdine		–		4	–	5	–	0
Saint Mary's		–		3	–	6	–	1
Portland		–		3	–	5	–	0
Cal Poly San Dimas		–		2	–	8	–	0
Rankings from AP Poll

The 1949 Portland Pilots football team was an American football team that represented the University of Portland as an independent during the 1949 college football season. The team compiled a 3–5 record. The coaching staff was led by former Notre Dame star Harry "The Horse" Wright in his first year as head coach. Wright was assisted by two other Notre Dame alumni—Neil Green as line coach and Floyd Simmons as backfield coach.

Key players included quarterback Danny Christianson, left halfback John Freeman, right halfback Larry Wissbaum, and end Joe Marshello.

In February 1950, Rev. T. J. Mehling, president of the University of Portland, announced that the school was abandoning its football program in order to focus its efforts on its basketball program. Mehling cited the "extraordinary expenses" associated with maintaining a first-rate football program.

Portland's decision to cease competition in intercollegiate football was part of a trend among Catholic universities during the war and immediate post-war years to terminate their football programs: Gonzaga (1941); Providence (1941); Creighton (1942); Manhattan (1942); Saint Louis (1949); Saint Mary's (1950); (Note: Saint Mary's did make a comeback to football at "College Division" (ancestor of NCAA Division II and III) level between 1959 and 1992, and would play as an independent in NCAA division I-AA (ancestor of today's Football Championship Subdivision) between 1993 and 2003, before dropping football again after 2003.) Mount St. Mary's (1950); Niagara (1950); Loyola (1951); San Francisco (1951); (Note: San Francisco did make a comeback to football at "College Division" level between 1959 and 1982, but has not fielded a varsity football team since 1983.) St. Bonaventure (1951) and Santa Clara (1952). (Note: Santa Clara did make a comeback to football at "College Division" level between 1959 and 1992, but has not fielded a varsity football team since 1993.)

== Schedule ==
Date	Opponent	Site	Result	Attendance	Source
September 17	Central Washington	Vaughn Street Park; Portland, OR	W 32–0	5,000	
September 25	Nevada	Multnomah Stadium; Portland, OR	L 27–53	8,500	
October 1	at Montana State	Gatton Field; Bozeman, MT	W 40–0	3,000	
October 9	at Santa Clara	Grape Bowl; Lodi, CA	L 13–26		
October 15	Pacific (CA)	Multnomah Stadium; Portland, OR	L 20–75		
October 22	at Pepperdine	Sentinel Field; Inglewood, CA	L 13–16		
October 29	vs. Idaho	Public School Field; Boise, ID	L 21–49		
November 19	Lewis & Clark	Multnomah Stadium; Portland, OR	W 35–20		
