= 1949 Humboldt State Lumberjacks football team =

American college football season

1949 Humboldt State Lumberjacks football
- Conference: Far Western Conference
- Record: 0–8–1 (0–3–1 FWC)
- Head coach: Ted Staffler (1st season)
- Home stadium: Redwood Bowl

1949 Far Western Conference football standings
| | Conf. | | | | | Overall |
| Team | W | | L | | T | W | | L | | T |
|---|---|---|---|---|---|---|---|---|---|---|
| Cal Aggies $ | 4 | – | 0 | – | 0 | 5 | – | 4 | – | 0 |
| Southern Oregon | 2 | – | 1 | – | 1 | 5 | – | 2 | – | 1 |
| San Francisco State | 1 | – | 2 | – | 1 | 3 | – | 4 | – | 1 |
| Chico State | 1 | – | 2 | – | 1 | 2 | – | 6 | – | 1 |
| Humboldt State | 0 | – | 3 | – | 1 | 0 | – | 8 | – | 1 |
$ – Conference champion

The 1949 Humboldt State Lumberjacks football team represented Humboldt State College—now known as California State Polytechnic University, Humboldt—as a member of the Far Western Conference (FWC) during the 1949 college football season. Led by first-year head coach Ted Staffler, the Lumberjacks compiled an overall record of 0–8–1 with a mark of 0–3–1 in conference play, placing last out of five teams in the FWC, and were outscored by their opponents 257 to 78 for the season. The team played home games at the Redwood Bowl in Arcata, California.

== Schedule ==
| Date | Opponent | Site | Result | Source |
|---|---|---|---|---|
| September 18 | Hamilton Field (Note: Hamilton Army Airfield was a United States Air Force Base from 1934 to 1974.)* | Redwood Bowl; Arcata, CA | L 12–14 | |
| September 24 | Linfield* | Redwood Bowl; Arcata, CA | L 7–22 | |
| October 1 | at Southern Oregon | Walter E. Phillips Field?; Ashland, OR | L 13–27 | |
| October 15 | Cal Aggies | Redwood Bowl; Arcata, CA | L 6–33 | |
| October 22 | Stanford JV* | Redwood Bowl; Arcata, CA | L 0–32 | |
| October 29 | San Francisco State | Redwood Bowl; Arcata, CA | L 20–26 | |
| November 5 | at Chico State | Chico High School Stadium; Chico, CA | T 0–0 | |
| November 11 | California JV (Note: The University of California JV team was commonly known as the "Cal Ramblers".)* | Redwood Bowl; Arcata, CA | L 20–47 | |
| November 19 | at Oregon College* | McArthur Field; Monmouth, OR | L 0–56 | |
*Non-conference game
