= 1949 New Mexico Lobos football team =

American college football season

1949 New Mexico Lobos football
- Conference: Border Conference
- Record: 2–8 (1–6 Border)
- Head coach: Berl Huffman (3rd season)
- Home stadium: Zimmerman Field

1949 Border Conference football standings
	Conf.					Overall
Team	W		L		T	W		L		T
Texas Tech $	5	–	0	–	0	7	–	5	–	0
Arizona State	4	–	1	–	0	7	–	3	–	0
Texas Western	4	–	2	–	0	8	–	2	–	1
Hardin–Simmons	4	–	2	–	0	6	–	4	–	1
West Texas State	3	–	2	–	0	5	–	4	–	0
Arizona	2	–	4	–	0	2	–	7	–	1
New Mexico A&M	1	–	4	–	0	4	–	6	–	0
New Mexico	1	–	6	–	0	2	–	8	–	0
Arizona State–Flagstaff	0	–	3	–	0	1	–	6	–	1
$ – Conference champion

The 1949 New Mexico Lobos football team represented the University of New Mexico in the Border Conference during the 1949 college football season. In their third and final season under head coach Berl Huffman, the Lobos compiled a 2–8 record (1–6 against conference opponents), finished eighth in the Border Conference, and were outscored by opponents by a total of 307 to 98.

== Schedule ==
Date	Opponent	Site	Result	Attendance	Source
September 24	Wyoming*	Zimmerman Field; Albuquerque, NM	L 14–41	12,000	
September 30	at New Mexico A&M	Quesenberry Field; Las Cruces, NM (rivalry)	W 14–13		
October 8	at Rice*	Rice Field; Houston, TX	L 0–55	15,000	
October 15	vs. Hardin–Simmons	Broncho Stadium; Odessa, TX	L 7–34	8,000	
October 22	at Texas Western	Kidd Field; El Paso, TX	L 0–7	5,000	
October 29	Arizona State	Zimmerman Field; Albuquerque, NM	L 19–28	9,000	
November 5	at Arizona	Arizona Stadium; Tucson, AZ (rivalry)	L 14–46	13,200	
November 12	Colorado*	Zimmerman Field; Albuquerque, NM	W 17–15	8,000–9,000	
November 19	Texas Tech^{†}	Zimmerman Field; Albuquerque, NM	L 0–27	10,000	
November 26	West Texas State	Zimmerman Field; Albuquerque, NM	L 13–41		
*Non-conference game; ^{†}Homecoming
