= 1949 Saint Mary's Gaels football team =

American college football season

1949 Saint Mary's Gaels football
- Conference: Independent
- Record: 3–6–1
- Head coach: Joe Verducci (2nd season)
- Home stadium: Kezar Stadium

1949 Western college football independents records
	Conf.			Overall
Team	W	L	T	W		L		T
No. 10 Pacific (CA)		–		11	–	0	–	0
Oregon College		–		9	–	0	–	0
No. 15 Santa Clara		–		8	–	2	–	1
San Francisco		–		7	–	3	–	0
Idaho State		–		6	–	2	–	1
Hawaii		–		6	–	3	–	0
La Verne		–		5	–	3	–	2
Loyola (CA)		–		6	–	4	–	0
Nevada		–		5	–	5	–	0
Pepperdine		–		4	–	5	–	0
Saint Mary's		–		3	–	6	–	1
Portland		–		3	–	5	–	0
Cal Poly San Dimas		–		2	–	8	–	0
Rankings from AP Poll

The 1949 Saint Mary's Gaels football team was an American football team that represented Saint Mary's College of California during the 1949 college football season. In their second and final season under head coach Joe Verducci, the Gaels compiled a 3–6–1 record and were outscored by opponents by a combined total of 243 to 168.

In February 1950, Verducci resigned as the Gaels' head football coach to accept the same position at San Francisco State College.

== Schedule ==
Date	Opponent	Site	Result	Attendance	Source
September 16	Oregon	Kezar Stadium; San Francisco, CA (Governors' Trophy Game)	L 7–24	40,000	
September 24	at California	California Memorial Stadium; Berkeley, CA	L 7–29	50,000	
October 2	Nevada	Kezar Stadium; San Francisco, CA	W 20–14	10,000	
October 7	at No. 16 Villanova	Shibe Park; Philadelphia, PA	L 20–28	14,632	
October 16	at Loyola (CA)	Gilmore Stadium; Los Angeles, CA	W 27–14	7,000	
October 23	vs. San Francisco	Kezar Stadium; San Francisco, CA	L 14–41	38,000	
October 28	Drake	Kezar Stadium; San Francisco, CA	T 13–13	5,700	
November 5	vs. Denver	Grape Bowl; Lodi, CA	W 41–21		
November 13	vs. No. 20 Santa Clara	Kezar Stadium; San Francisco, CA	L 6–19	37,640	
November 18	at San Jose State	Spartan Stadium; San Jose, CA	L 13–40	11,000	
Rankings from AP Poll released prior to the game
