= 1949 Drake Bulldogs football team =

American college football season

1949 Drake Bulldogs football
- Conference: Missouri Valley Conference
- Record: 6–2–1 (3–1 MVC)
- Head coach: Warren Gaer (1st season)
- Home stadium: Drake Stadium

1949 Missouri Valley Conference football standings
	Conf.					Overall
Team	W		L		T	W		L		T
Detroit $	4	–	0	–	0	5	–	4	–	0
Drake	3	–	1	–	0	6	–	2	–	1
Oklahoma A&M	2	–	1	–	1	4	–	4	–	2
Wichita	2	–	3	–	1	3	–	6	–	1
Tulsa	1	–	2	–	1	5	–	5	–	1
Bradley	1	–	3	–	0	5	–	5	–	0
Saint Louis	0	–	3	–	1	2	–	6	–	0
$ – Conference champion

The 1949 Drake Bulldogs football team was an American football team that represented Drake University as a member of the Missouri Valley Conference during the 1949 college football season. In its first season under head coach Warren Gaer, the team compiled a 6–2–1 record (3–1 against MVC opponents), finished second in the conference, and outscored opponents by a total of 202 to 95. The team played its home games at Drake Stadium in Des Moines, Iowa.

Drake halfback Johnny Bright led the nation in total offense in both 1949 and 1950. See List of NCAA major college football yearly total offense leaders. He was the second African-American athlete to lead the country in this category after Kenny Washington did so in 1939. Bright later played 11 seasons in the Canadian Football League and was inducted into both the College Football Hall of Fame and the Canadian Football Hall of Fame.

The 1949 Drake team also set new NCAA major college single season records for most yards penalized (917) and most penalties committed (103), topping Notre Dame's NCAA records of 97 penalties for 843 yards set in 1948. A record was also set for most penalty yards per game, with Drake assessed an average of 101.9 yards per contest — topping the 88.4 yards per game marched off against the 1948 Army team.

== Schedule ==
Date	Opponent	Site	Result	Attendance	Source
September 17	South Dakota State*	Drake Stadium; Des Moines, IA	W 40–0		
September 24	Emporia State*	Drake Stadium; Des Moines, IA	W 42–0		
October 1	at Bradley	Peoria Stadium; Peoria, IL	W 17–7		
October 7	South Dakota*	Drake Stadium; Des Moines, IA	W 48–6	10,000	
October 15	at Oklahoma A&M	Lewis Field; Stillwater, OK	L 0–28		
October 22	Saint Louis	Drake Stadium; Des Moines, IA	W 27–14		
October 29	at Saint Mary's*	Kezar Stadium; San Francisco, CA	T 13–13	5,700	
November 5	Iowa State*	Drake Stadium; Des Moines, IA	L 8–21		
November 12	at Wichita	Veterans Field; Wichita, KS	W 7–6		
*Non-conference game
