= 1949 Santa Barbara Gauchos football team =

American college football season

1949 Santa Barbara Gauchos football
- Conference: California Collegiate Athletic Association
- Record: 2–7 (1–3 CCAA)
- Head coach: Roy Engle (1st season)
- Home stadium: La Playa Stadium

1949 California Collegiate Athletic Association football standings
	Conf.					Overall
Team	W		L		T	W		L		T
San Jose State $	4	–	0	–	0	9	–	4	–	0
San Diego State	3	–	1	–	0	6	–	3	–	0
Cal Poly	1	–	3	–	0	4	–	6	–	0
Fresno State	1	–	3	–	0	3	–	8	–	0
Santa Barbara	1	–	3	–	0	2	–	7	–	0
$ – Conference champion

The 1949 UC Santa Barbara Gauchos football team represented Santa Barbara College—now known as—University of California, Santa Barbara—as a member of the California Collegiate Athletic Association (CCAA) during the 1949 college football season. Led by first-year head coach Roy Engle, the Gauchos compiled an overall record of 2–7 with a mark of 1–3 in conference play, placing in a three-way tie at the bottom of the CCAA standings. The team played home games at La Playa Stadium in Santa Barbara, California.

== Schedule ==
Date	Time	Opponent	Site	Result	Attendance	Source
September 23	8:15 p.m.	Whittier*	La Playa Stadium; Santa Barbara, CA	L 6–20	5,500	
September 30	8:00 p.m.	at Pomona*	Claremont Alumni Field; Claremont, CA	L 13–21	4,000	
October 8	8:15 p.m.	Occidental*	La Playa Stadium; Santa Barbara, CA	L 12–31		
October 14		Fresno State	La Playa Stadium; Santa Barbara, CA	W 14–7		
October 21	8:00 p.m.	at San Jose State	Spartan Stadium; San Jose, CA	L 14–55	6,000	
October 29		vs. Cal Aggies (Note: The game against the Cal Aggies was part of an "All-UC Doubleheader" that was held annually from 1948 to 1963. The other game of the double-header was California vs. UCLA. The games were always held at the home stadium of either Cal or UCLA.)*	Los Angeles Memorial Coliseum; Los Angeles, CA	W 40–6		
November 5	8:15 p.m.	Pepperdine*^{†}	La Playa Stadium; Santa Barbara, CA	L 12–33	4,500	
November 11		at Cal Poly	Mustang Stadium; San Luis Obispo, CA	L 0–7	4,000	
November 24		at San Diego State	Aztec Bowl; San Diego, CA	L 0–22	5,500–6,000	
*Non-conference game; ^{†}Homecoming; All times are in Pacific time

== Team players in the NFL ==
No Santa Barbara Gaucho players were selected in the 1950 NFL draft. The following finished their Santa Barbara Gauchos career in 1949, were not drafted, but played in the NFL.

Player	Position	First NFL team
Royal Cathcart	Halfback	1950 San Francisco 49ers
