= 1949 Pepperdine Waves football team =

American college football season

1949 Pepperdine Waves football
- Conference: Independent
- Record: 4–5
- Head coach: Ray Richards (1st season)
- Home stadium: Sentinel Field

1949 Western college football independents records
	Conf.			Overall
Team	W	L	T	W		L		T
No. 10 Pacific (CA)		–		11	–	0	–	0
Oregon College		–		9	–	0	–	0
No. 15 Santa Clara		–		8	–	2	–	1
San Francisco		–		7	–	3	–	0
Idaho State		–		6	–	2	–	1
Hawaii		–		6	–	3	–	0
La Verne		–		5	–	3	–	2
Loyola (CA)		–		6	–	4	–	0
Nevada		–		5	–	5	–	0
Pepperdine		–		4	–	5	–	0
Saint Mary's		–		3	–	6	–	1
Portland		–		3	–	5	–	0
Cal Poly San Dimas		–		2	–	8	–	0
Rankings from AP Poll

The 1949 Pepperdine Waves football team represented George Pepperdine College (Note: Pepperdine University was known as George Pepperdine College from 1937 to 1970.) as an independent during the 1949 college football season. The team was led by first-year head coach Ray Richards. For the 1949 season, the Waves moved home games back to Sentinel Field on the campus of Inglewood High School in Inglewood, California. They had previously played at Sentinel Field in 1946 and 1947. Pepperdine finished the season with a record of 4–5. They joined the California Collegiate Athletic Association (CCAA) in 1950.

== Schedule ==
Date	Time	Opponent	Site	Result	Attendance	Source
September 17		at Arizona State–Flagstaff	Skidmore Field; Flagstaff, AZ	W 39–0		
September 25		Arizona State	Sentinel Field; Inglewood, CA	L 13–33		
October 1		San Diego State	Sentinel Field; Inglewood, CA	L 7–9	6,000	
October 7		at San Jose State	Spartan Stadium; San Jose, CA	L 12–49		
October 22		Portland	Sentinel Field; Inglewood, CA	W 16–13		
November 5	8:15 p.m.	at Santa Barbara	La Playa Stadium; Santa Barbara, CA	W 33–12	4,500	
November 11		at Fresno State	Ratcliffe Stadium; Fresno, CA	L 7–20	4,729	
November 18		at Loyola (CA)	Gilmore Stadium; Los Angeles, CA	L 6–20	11,800	
November 26		BYU	Sentinel Field; Inglewood, CA	W 28–14	8,000	
All times are in Pacific time

== Team players in the NFL ==
The following player finished his career at Pepperdine in 1949 then served in the military for two years before being selected in the 1952 NFL draft.

Player	Position	Round	Overall	NFL team
Jack Bighead	Defensive end – End	15	170	Dallas Texans
