= 1949 Tulsa Golden Hurricane football team =

American college football season

1949 Tulsa Golden Hurricane football
- Conference: Missouri Valley Conference
- Record: 5–5–1 (1–2–1 MVC)
- Head coach: Buddy Brothers (4th season)
- Home stadium: Skelly Field

1949 Missouri Valley Conference football standings
| | Conf. | | | | | Overall |
| Team | W | | L | | T | W | | L | | T |
|---|---|---|---|---|---|---|---|---|---|---|
| Detroit $ | 4 | – | 0 | – | 0 | 5 | – | 4 | – | 0 |
| Drake | 3 | – | 1 | – | 0 | 6 | – | 2 | – | 1 |
| Oklahoma A&M | 2 | – | 1 | – | 1 | 4 | – | 4 | – | 2 |
| Wichita | 2 | – | 3 | – | 1 | 3 | – | 6 | – | 1 |
| Tulsa | 1 | – | 2 | – | 1 | 5 | – | 5 | – | 1 |
| Bradley | 1 | – | 3 | – | 0 | 5 | – | 5 | – | 0 |
| Saint Louis | 0 | – | 3 | – | 1 | 2 | – | 6 | – | 0 |
$ – Conference champion

The 1949 Tulsa Golden Hurricane football team represented the University of Tulsa during the 1949 college football season. In their fourth year under head coach Buddy Brothers, the Golden Hurricane compiled a 5–5–1 record, 1–2–1 against conference opponents, and finished in fifth place in the Missouri Valley Conference.

== Schedule ==
| Date | Time | Opponent | Site | Result | Attendance | Source |
|---|---|---|---|---|---|---|
| September 17 | 8:00 p.m. | McMurry* | Skelly Field; Tulsa, OK | W 27–26 | 10,000 | |
| September 23 | | at Detroit | University of Detroit Stadium; Detroit, MI | L 14–20 | 22,254 | |
| October 1 | | Florida* | Skelly Field; Tulsa, OK | L 7–40 | 9,248 | |
| October 8 | | at Texas Tech* | Jones Stadium; Lubbock, TX | L 0–15 | 13,000–15,000 | |
| October 14 | | at No. 17 Villanova* | Villanova Stadium; Villanova, PA | W 21–19 | 12,000 | |
| October 22 | | Bradley | Skelly Field; Tulsa, OK | W 55–6 | 10,246 | |
| October 29 | | Wichita | Skelly Field; Tulsa, OK | L 21–27 | 10,021 | |
| November 5 | | at Oklahoma A&M | Lewis Field; Stillwater, OK (rivalry) | T 13–13 | 15,500 | |
| November 12 | | San Francisco* | Skelly Field; Tulsa, OK | W 10–0 | 7,000 | |
| November 19 | | Kansas State*^{†} | Skelly Field; Tulsa, OK | W 48–27 | 11,000 | |
| November 26 | | at Arkansas* | Razorback Stadium; Fayetteville, AR | L 7–40 | 12,000 | |
*Non-conference game; ^{†}Homecoming; Rankings from AP Poll released prior to the game; All times are in Central time

== After the season ==
=== 1950 NFL draft ===
The following Golden Hurricane player was selected in the 1950 NFL draft following the season.

| Round | Pick | Player | Position | NFL club |
|---|---|---|---|---|
| 8 | 104 | Russ Frizzell | Tackle | Cleveland Browns |
