= 1949 Chico State Wildcats football team =

American college football season

1949 Chico State Wildcats football
- Conference: Far Western Conference
- Record: 2–6–1 (1–2–1 FWC)
- Head coach: Roy Bohler (8th season)
- Home stadium: Chico High School Stadium

1949 Far Western Conference football standings
	Conf.					Overall
Team	W		L		T	W		L		T
Cal Aggies $	4	–	0	–	0	5	–	4	–	0
Southern Oregon	2	–	1	–	1	5	–	2	–	1
San Francisco State	1	–	2	–	1	3	–	4	–	1
Chico State	1	–	2	–	1	2	–	6	–	1
Humboldt State	0	–	3	–	1	0	–	8	–	1
$ – Conference champion

The 1949 Chico State Wildcats football team represented Chico State College—now known as California State University, Chico—as a member of the Far Western Conference (FWC) during the 1949 college football season. Led Roy Bohler in his eighth and final season as head coach, Chico State compiled an overall record of 2–6–1 with a mark of 1–2–1 in conference play, tying for third place in the FWC. The team was outscored by its opponents 148 to 83 for the season. The Wildcats played home games at Chico High School Stadium in Chico, California.

Bohler finished his tenure at Chico State with a record of 24–35–5, for a .414 winning percentage.

== Schedule ==
Date	Opponent	Site	Result	Source
September 24	Fairfield-Suisun AAF (Note: Travis Air Force Base was known as Fairfield-Suisun Army Air Force Base from 1947–1951.)*	Chico High School Stadium?; Chico, CA?	W 40–2	
October 1	at Willamette*	Sweetland Field; Salem, OR	L 0–7	
October 8	California JV (Note: The University of California JV team was commonly known as the "Cal Ramblers".)*	Chico High School Stadium; Chico, CA	L 0–24	
October 15	San Francisco State	Chico High School Stadium; Chico, CA	W 19–6	
October 22	at Pacific (OR)*	Tom Reynolds Field; Forest Grove, OR	L 0–33	
October 29	at Southern Oregon	Walter E. Phillips Field?; Ashland, OR	L 14–21	
November 5	Humboldt State	Chico High School Stadium; Chico, CA	T 0–0	
November 11	Oregon College*	Chico High School Stadium; Chico, CA	L 7–43	
November 19	at Cal Aggies	Aggie Field; Davis, CA	L 3–12	
*Non-conference game
