= 1949 Hardin–Simmons Cowboys football team =

American college football season

1949 Hardin–Simmons Cowboys football
- Conference: Border Conference
- Record: 6–4–1 (4–2 Border)
- Head coach: Warren B. Woodson (6th season)
- Home stadium: Parramore Field

1949 Border Conference football standings
	Conf.					Overall
Team	W		L		T	W		L		T
Texas Tech $	5	–	0	–	0	7	–	5	–	0
Arizona State	4	–	1	–	0	7	–	3	–	0
Texas Western	4	–	2	–	0	8	–	2	–	1
Hardin–Simmons	4	–	2	–	0	6	–	4	–	1
West Texas State	3	–	2	–	0	5	–	4	–	0
Arizona	2	–	4	–	0	2	–	7	–	1
New Mexico A&M	1	–	4	–	0	4	–	6	–	0
New Mexico	1	–	6	–	0	2	–	8	–	0
Arizona State–Flagstaff	0	–	3	–	0	1	–	6	–	1
$ – Conference champion

The 1949 Hardin–Simmons Cowboys football team was an American football team that represented Hardin–Simmons University in the Border Conference during the 1949 college football season. In its sixth season under head coach Warren B. Woodson, the team compiled a 6–4–1 record (4–2 against conference opponents), tied for third place in the conference, and outscored opponents by a total of 318 to 189.

The team was led by halfback Hook Davis, quarterback John "Model T" Ford, and end Bob McChesney, all three of whom were named to the 1949 All-Border Conference football team. Ford threw 26 touchdown passes in 11 games during the 1949 season, breaking the national record of 22 set one year earlier by Nevada quarterback Stan Heath.

== Schedule ==
Date	Opponent	Site	Result	Attendance	Source
September 17	North Texas State*	Parramore Field; Abilene, TX	W 13–7	7,500	
September 24	at Cincinnati*	Nippert Stadium; Cincinnati, OH	L 21–27		
October 1	at Arizona State	Goodwin Stadium; Tempe, AZ	W 34–13		
October 8	Arizona^{†}	Parramore Field; Abilene, TX	W 35–0	8,000	
October 15	vs. New Mexico	Broncho Stadium; Odessa, TX	W 34–7	8,000	
October 22	at Houston*	Public School Stadium; Houston, TX	T 27–27	8,000–10,000	
October 29	Texas Western	Parramore Field; Abilene, TX	W 33–14	8,000	
November 4	at Loyola (CA)*	Gilmore Stadium; Los Angeles, CA	L 35–39	10,200	
November 12	at West Texas State	Buffalo Bowl; Canyon, TX	L 7–19		
November 26	at Texas Tech	Jones Stadium; Lubbock, TX	L 13–23	15,500	
December 2	at Trinity (TX)*	Alamo Stadium; San Antonio, TX	W 66–13		
*Non-conference game; ^{†}Homecoming
