= 1949 Whittier Poets football team =

American college football season

1949 Whittier Poets football

SCC champion
- Conference: Southern California Conference
- Record: 8–1 (4–0 SCC)
- Head coach: Wallace Newman (18th season)
- Home stadium: Hadley Field

1949 Southern California Conference football standings
	Conf.					Overall
Team	W		L		T	W		L		T
Whittier $	4	–	0	–	0	8	–	1	–	0
Pomona	3	–	1	–	0	6	–	2	–	0
Redlands	2	–	2	–	0	4	–	3	–	1
Occidental	1	–	3	–	0	4	–	4	–	0
Caltech	0	–	4	–	0	0	–	6	–	1
$ – Conference champion

The 1949 Whittier Poets football team represented Whittier College as a member of the Southern California Conference (SCC) during the 1949 college football season. Led by 18th-year head coach Wallace Newman, the Poets compiled an overall record of 8–1 with a mark of 4–0 in conference play, winning the SCC title. Whittier played home games at Hadley Field in Whittier, California.

== Schedule ==
Date	Time	Opponent	Site	Result	Attendance	Source
September 23	8:15 p.m.	at Santa Barbara*	La Playa Stadium; Santa Barbara, CA	W 20–6	5,500	
October 1	8:00 p.m.	San Francisco State*	Hadley Field; Whittier, CA	W 60–0	5,000	
October 8	8:00 p.m.	at Caltech	Rose Bowl; Pasadena, CA	W 55–7		
October 15	6:30 p.m.	at Arizona State–Flagstaff*	Skidmore Field; Flagstaff, AZ	W 20–13		
October 22	8:00 p.m.	at Occidental	Patterson Field; Los Angeles, CA	W 54–6		
October 29	8:00 p.m.	Cal Poly*	Hadley Field; Whittier, CA	L 0–19	6,000	
November 5	8:00 p.m.	Pomona^{†}	Hadley Field; Whittier, CA	W 14–13	9,000	
November 11		at Cal Aggies*	Aggie Field; Davis, CA	W 20–13		
November 19	8:00 p.m.	Redlands	Hadley Field; Whittier, CA	W 40–13	7,000	
*Non-conference game; ^{†}Homecoming; All times are in Pacific time
