= 1949 New Mexico A&M Aggies football team =

American college football season

1949 New Mexico A&M Aggies football
- Conference: Border Conference
- Record: 4–6 (1–4 Border)
- Head coach: Vaughn Corley (2nd season)
- Home stadium: Quesenberry Field

1949 Border Conference football standings
| | Conf. | | | | | Overall |
| Team | W | | L | | T | W | | L | | T |
|---|---|---|---|---|---|---|---|---|---|---|
| Texas Tech $ | 5 | – | 0 | – | 0 | 7 | – | 5 | – | 0 |
| Arizona State | 4 | – | 1 | – | 0 | 7 | – | 3 | – | 0 |
| Texas Western | 4 | – | 2 | – | 0 | 8 | – | 2 | – | 1 |
| Hardin–Simmons | 4 | – | 2 | – | 0 | 6 | – | 4 | – | 1 |
| West Texas State | 3 | – | 2 | – | 0 | 5 | – | 4 | – | 0 |
| Arizona | 2 | – | 4 | – | 0 | 2 | – | 7 | – | 1 |
| New Mexico A&M | 1 | – | 4 | – | 0 | 4 | – | 6 | – | 0 |
| New Mexico | 1 | – | 6 | – | 0 | 2 | – | 8 | – | 0 |
| Arizona State–Flagstaff | 0 | – | 3 | – | 0 | 1 | – | 6 | – | 1 |
$ – Conference champion

The 1949 New Mexico A&M Aggies football team was an American football team that represented New Mexico College of Agriculture and Mechanical Arts (now known as New Mexico State University) as a member of the Border Conference during the 1949 college football season. In their second year under head coach Vaughn Corley, the Aggies compiled a 4–6 record (1–4 against conference opponents), finished seventh in the conference, and were outscored by a total of 315 to 265. The team played home games on Quesenberry Field in Las Cruces, New Mexico.

== Schedule ==
| Date | Opponent | Site | Result | Attendance | Source |
|---|---|---|---|---|---|
| September 17 | White Sands Proving Ground* | Quesenberry Field; Las Cruces, NM | W 68–0 | | |
| September 24 | at Arizona | Arizona Stadium; Tucson, AZ | L 7–40 | 14,000 | |
| September 30 | New Mexico | Quesenberry Field; Las Cruces, NM (rivalry) | L 13–14 | | |
| October 6 | New Mexico Military* | Quesenberry Field; Las Cruces, NM | W 45–25 | | |
| October 15 | at San Diego State* | Aztec Bowl; San Diego, CA | L 18–39 | 8,000 | |
| October 29 | New Mexico Highlands* | Quesenberry Field; Las Cruces, NM | W 40–12 | | |
| November 5 | at Arizona State | Goodwin Stadium; Tempe, AZ | L 32–68 | 13,500 | |
| November 12 | Arizona State–Flagstaff | Quesenberry Field; Las Cruces, NM | W 35–0 | | |
| November 19 | Colorado A&M* | Quesenberry Field; Las Cruces, NM | L 0–45 | | |
| November 25 | at Texas Western | Kidd Field; El Paso, TX (rivalry) | L 7–69 | 5,000 | |
*Non-conference game
