= 1949 Pacific Tigers football team =

American college football season

1949 Pacific Tigers football
- Conference: Independent

Ranking
- AP: No. 10
- Record: 11–0
- Head coach: Larry Siemering (3rd season)
- Home stadium: Baxter Stadium, Grape Bowl

1949 Western college football independents records
	Conf.			Overall
Team	W	L	T	W		L		T
No. 10 Pacific (CA)		–		11	–	0	–	0
Oregon College		–		9	–	0	–	0
No. 15 Santa Clara		–		8	–	2	–	1
San Francisco		–		7	–	3	–	0
Idaho State		–		6	–	2	–	1
Hawaii		–		6	–	3	–	0
La Verne		–		5	–	3	–	2
Loyola (CA)		–		6	–	4	–	0
Nevada		–		5	–	5	–	0
Pepperdine		–		4	–	5	–	0
Saint Mary's		–		3	–	6	–	1
Portland		–		3	–	5	–	0
Cal Poly San Dimas		–		2	–	8	–	0
Rankings from AP Poll

The 1949 Pacific Tigers football team was an American football team that represented the College of the Pacific—now known as the University of the Pacific—in Stockton, California as an independent during the 1949 college football season. In their third season under head coach Larry Siemering, the Tigers compiled an undefeated 11–0 record, were ranked No. 10 in the final AP poll, and outscored all opponents by a combined total of 575 to 66. The Tigers' victories included a 34–7 besting of Cincinnati, a 62–14 victory over San Diego State, and a 45–6 victory over Utah.

Quarterback Eddie LeBaron was selected by both the Associated Press and International News Service as a first-team player on the 1949 All-Pacific Coast football team.

== Schedule ==
Date	Time	Opponent	Rank	Site	Result	Attendance	Source
September 17		San Francisco		Grape Bowl; Lodi, CA	W 7–6	18,000	
September 23		at Loyola (CA)		Gilmore Stadium; Los Angeles, CA	W 52–0	8,500	
October 1		Cincinnati^{†}		Baxter Stadium; Stockton, CA	W 34–7		
October 8		Nevada		Baxter Stadium; Stockton, CA	W 47–6		
October 15		at Portland		Multnomah Stadium; Portland, OR	W 75–20		
October 22		San Diego State		Baxter Stadium; Stockton, CA	W 62–14	8,000	
October 28		at San Jose State		Spartan Stadium; San Jose, CA (Victory Bell)	W 45–7		
November 12	8:15 p.m.	Utah	No. 19	Grape Bowl; Lodi, CA	W 45–6	17,000	
November 18		Fresno State		Baxter Stadium; Stockton, CA	W 45–0	8,500	
November 24		at Cal Poly	No. 11	Mustang Stadium; San Luis Obispo, CA	W 88–0		
December 16		at Hawaii	No. 10	Honolulu Stadium; Honolulu, HI	W 75–0	28,000	
^{†}Homecoming; Rankings from AP Poll released prior to the game; All times are in Pacific time

== Rankings ==
Ranking movements Legend: ██ Increase in ranking ██ Decrease in ranking — = Not ranked ( ) = First-place votes
	Week								
Poll	1	2	3	4	5	6	7	8	Final
AP	—	—	—	—	—	19	—	11 (2)	10 (4)

== Team players in the NFL ==
The following Pacific Tigers were selected in the 1950 NFL draft.

Player	Position	Round	Overall	NFL team
Don Campora	Tackle – Defensive tackle	2	23	San Francisco 49ers
Eddie LeBaron	Quarterback	10	123	Washington Redskins
