= 1949 Bradley Braves football team =

American college football season

1949 Bradley Braves football
- Conference: Missouri Valley Conference
- Record: 5–5 (1–3 MVC)
- Head coach: Art Bergstrom (2rd season)
- Home stadium: Peoria Stadium

1949 Missouri Valley Conference football standings
	Conf.					Overall
Team	W		L		T	W		L		T
Detroit $	4	–	0	–	0	5	–	4	–	0
Drake	3	–	1	–	0	6	–	2	–	1
Oklahoma A&M	2	–	1	–	1	4	–	4	–	2
Wichita	2	–	3	–	1	3	–	6	–	1
Tulsa	1	–	2	–	1	5	–	5	–	1
Bradley	1	–	3	–	0	5	–	5	–	0
Saint Louis	0	–	3	–	1	2	–	6	–	0
$ – Conference champion

The 1949 Bradley Braves football team was an American football team that represented Bradley University as a member of the Missouri Valley Conference (MVC) during the 1949 college football season. Led by Art Bergstrom in his second season as head coach, the Braves compiled an overall record of 5–5 with a mark of 1–3 in conference play, placing sixth out of seven teams in the MVC.

== Schedule ==
Date	Opponent	Site	Result	Attendance	Source
September 17	Ripon*	Peoria Stadium; Peoria, IL	W 14–0		
September 24	Louisiana Tech*	Peoria Stadium; Peoria, IL	W 20–18	5,000	
October 1	Drake	Peoria Stadium; Peoria, IL	L 17–7		
October 8	at Wichita	Veterans Field; Wichita, KS	L 21–13		
October 15	Washington & Jefferson*	Peoria Stadium; Peoria, IL	W 19–7		
October 22	at Tulsa	Skelly Stadium; Tulsa, OK	L 55–6	10,246	
October 29	Louisville*	Peoria Stadium; Peoria, IL	L 35–12		
November 5	Delaware*	Peoria Stadium; Peoria, IL	L 47–7	7,000	
November 12	South Dakota State*	Peoria Stadium; Peoria, IL	W 32–7		
November 19	at Saint Louis	Walsh Stadium; St. Louis, MO	W 29–7		
*Non-conference game
