= 1949 Nevada Wolf Pack football team =

American college football season

1949 Nevada Wolf Pack football
- Conference: Independent
- Record: 5–5
- Head coach: Joe Sheeketski (3rd season)
- Home stadium: Mackay Stadium

1949 Western college football independents records
| | Conf. | | | Overall |
| Team | W | L | T | W | | L | | T |
|---|---|---|---|---|---|---|---|---|
| No. 10 Pacific (CA) | | – | | 11 | – | 0 | – | 0 |
| Oregon College | | – | | 9 | – | 0 | – | 0 |
| No. 15 Santa Clara | | – | | 8 | – | 2 | – | 1 |
| San Francisco | | – | | 7 | – | 3 | – | 0 |
| Idaho State | | – | | 6 | – | 2 | – | 1 |
| Hawaii | | – | | 6 | – | 3 | – | 0 |
| La Verne | | – | | 5 | – | 3 | – | 2 |
| Loyola (CA) | | – | | 6 | – | 4 | – | 0 |
| Nevada | | – | | 5 | – | 5 | – | 0 |
| Pepperdine | | – | | 4 | – | 5 | – | 0 |
| Saint Mary's | | – | | 3 | – | 6 | – | 1 |
| Portland | | – | | 3 | – | 5 | – | 0 |
| Cal Poly San Dimas | | – | | 2 | – | 8 | – | 0 |
Rankings from AP Poll

The 1949 Nevada Wolf Pack football team was an American football team that represented the University of Nevada as an independent during the 1949 college football season. In its third season under head coach Joe Sheeketski, the Wolf Pack compiled a 5–5 record and outscored opponents by a total of 235 to 212.

== Schedule ==
| Date | Opponent | Site | Result | Attendance | Source |
|---|---|---|---|---|---|
| September 17 | at Cincinnati | Nippert Stadium; Cincinnati, OH | W 41–21 | | |
| September 25 | at Portland | Multnomah Stadium; Portland, OR | W 53–27 | 8,500 | |
| October 2 | at Saint Mary's | Kezar Stadium; San Francisco, CA | L 14–20 | 10,000 | |
| October 8 | at Pacific (CA) | Baxter Stadium; Stockton, CA | L 6–47 | | |
| October 15 | Wichita | Mackay Stadium; Reno, NV | W 20–7 | | |
| October 22 | Fresno State | Mackay Stadium; Reno, NV | W 34–13 | 6,500 | |
| October 30 | at San Francisco | Kezar Stadium; San Francisco, CA | L 13–41 | 18,000 | |
| November 6 | at Dayton | UD Stadium; Dayton, OH | L 14–16 | | |
| November 11 | at Loyola (CA) | Gilmore Stadium; Los Angeles, CA | L 12–13 | | |
| November 24 | North Texas State | Mackay Stadium; Reno, NV | W 28–7 | 4,500 | |
