= 1949 Colorado Buffaloes football team =

American college football season

1949 Colorado Buffaloes football
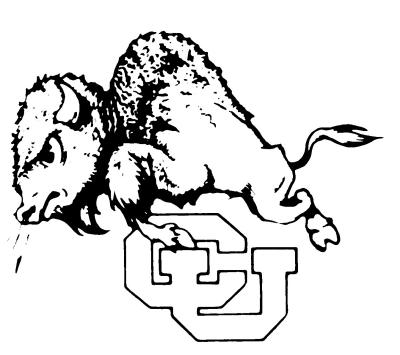
- Conference: Big Seven Conference
- Record: 3–7 (1–4 Big 7)
- Head coach: Dallas Ward (2nd season)
- Captain: Ed Pudlik
- Home stadium: Folsom Field

1949 Big Seven Conference football standings
	Conf.					Overall
Team	W		L		T	W		L		T
No. 2 Oklahoma $	5	–	0	–	0	11	–	0	–	0
No. 20 Missouri	5	–	1	–	0	7	–	4	–	0
Iowa State	3	–	3	–	0	5	–	3	–	1
Nebraska	3	–	3	–	0	4	–	5	–	0
Kansas	2	–	4	–	0	5	–	5	–	0
Colorado	1	–	4	–	0	3	–	7	–	0
Kansas State	1	–	5	–	0	2	–	8	–	0
$ – Conference champion; Rankings from AP Poll

The 1949 Colorado Buffaloes football team was an American football team that represented the University of Colorado as a member of the Big Seven Conference during the 1949 college football season. Led by second-year head coach Dallas Ward, the Buffaloes compiled an overall record of 3–7 with a mark of 1–4 in conference play, placing sixth in the Big 7.

== Schedule ==
Date	Opponent	Site	Result	Attendance	Source
September 24	Kansas	Colorado Stadium; Boulder, CO	W 13–12	22,095	
October 1	at Kansas State	Memorial Stadium; Manhattan, KS (rivalry)	L 13–27	13,397	
October 8	Iowa State	Colorado Stadium; Boulder, CO	L 6–13	16,234	
October 15	at Oregon*	Hayward Field; Eugene, OR	L 14–42	12,500	
October 22	at Utah State*	Romney Stadium; Logan, UT	W 20–7	4,000–7,000	
October 29	Utah*^{†}	Colorado Stadium; Boulder, CO (rivalry)	W 14–7	20,103	
November 7	Missouri	Colorado Stadium; Boulder, CO	L 13–20	19,781	
November 12	at New Mexico*	Zimmerman Field; Albuquerque, NM	L 15–17	8,000–9,000	
November 19	at Nebraska	Memorial Stadium; Lincoln, NE (rivalry)	L 14–25	32,000	
November 26	Colorado A&M*	Colorado Stadium; Boulder, CO (rivalry)	L 7–14	20,563	
*Non-conference game; ^{†}Homecoming
