= 1949 Arizona State Sun Devils football team =

American college football season

1949 Arizona State Sun Devils football

Salad Bowl, L 21–33 vs. Xavier
- Conference: Border Conference
- Record: 7–3 (4–1 Border)
- Head coach: Ed Doherty (3rd season)
- Captain: Cecil Coleman
- Home stadium: Goodwin Stadium

1949 Border Conference football standings
	Conf.					Overall
Team	W		L		T	W		L		T
Texas Tech $	5	–	0	–	0	7	–	5	–	0
Arizona State	4	–	1	–	0	7	–	3	–	0
Texas Western	4	–	2	–	0	8	–	2	–	1
Hardin–Simmons	4	–	2	–	0	6	–	4	–	1
West Texas State	3	–	2	–	0	5	–	4	–	0
Arizona	2	–	4	–	0	2	–	7	–	1
New Mexico A&M	1	–	4	–	0	4	–	6	–	0
New Mexico	1	–	6	–	0	2	–	8	–	0
Arizona State–Flagstaff	0	–	3	–	0	1	–	6	–	1
$ – Conference champion

The 1949 Arizona State Sun Devils college football team season was an American college football team that represented Arizona State College (later renamed Arizona State University) in the Border Conference during the 1949 college football season. In their third season under head coach Ed Doherty, the Sun Devils compiled a 7–3 record (4–1 against Border opponents), lost to Xavier in the Salad Bowl, and outscored their opponents by a combined total of 342 to 204.

== Schedule ==
Date	Opponent	Site	Result	Attendance	Source
September 24	at Pepperdine*	Sentinel Field; Inglewood, CA	W 33–13		
October 1	Hardin–Simmons	Goodwin Stadium; Tempe, AZ	L 13–34		
October 8	Arizona State–Flagstaff	Goodwin Stadium; Tempe, AZ	W 62–6	10,000	
October 15	BYU*	Goodwin Stadium; Tempe, AZ	W 49–21		
October 29	at New Mexico	Zimmerman Field; Albuquerque, NM	W 28–19	9,000	
November 5	New Mexico A&M	Goodwin Stadium; Tempe, AZ	W 68–32	13,500	
November 12	Arizona	Goodwin Stadium; Tempe, AZ (Territorial Cup)	W 34–7	18,000	
November 26	Loyola (CA)*	Goodwin Stadium; Tempe, AZ	L 7–27	13,000	
December 3	Utah State*	Goodwin Stadium; Tempe, AZ	W 27–12		
January 2, 1950	vs. Xavier*	Montgomery Stadium; Phoenix, AZ (Salad Bowl)	L 21–33	18,500	
*Non-conference game
