= 1949 Arizona State–Flagstaff Lumberjacks football team =

American college football season

1949 Arizona State–Flagstaff Lumberjacks football
- Conference: Border Conference
- Record: 1–6–1 (0–3 Border)
- Head coach: Emil Ladyko (1st season)
- Home stadium: Skidmore Field

1949 Border Conference football standings
	Conf.					Overall
Team	W		L		T	W		L		T
Texas Tech $	5	–	0	–	0	7	–	5	–	0
Arizona State	4	–	1	–	0	7	–	3	–	0
Texas Western	4	–	2	–	0	8	–	2	–	1
Hardin–Simmons	4	–	2	–	0	6	–	4	–	1
West Texas State	3	–	2	–	0	5	–	4	–	0
Arizona	2	–	4	–	0	2	–	7	–	1
New Mexico A&M	1	–	4	–	0	4	–	6	–	0
New Mexico	1	–	6	–	0	2	–	8	–	0
Arizona State–Flagstaff	0	–	3	–	0	1	–	6	–	1
$ – Conference champion

The 1949 Arizona State–Flagstaff Lumberjacks football team was an American football team that represented Arizona State College at Flagstaff (now known as Northern Arizona University) in the Border Conference during the 1949 college football season. In their first and only year under head coach Emil Ladyko, the Lumberjacks compiled a 1–6–1 record (0–3 against conference opponents), was outscored by a total of 261 to 102, and finished last of nine teams in the Border Conference.

The team played its home games at Skidmore Field in Flagstaff, Arizona.

== Schedule ==
Date	Time	Opponent	Site	Result	Attendance	Source
September 17		at Pepperdine*	Skidmore Field; Flagstaff, AZ	L 12–66		
September 24		Caltech*	Skidmore Field; Flagstaff, AZ	W 43–13		
October 1		Western State (CO)*	Skidmore Field; Flagstaff, AZ	L 14–25		
October 8		at Arizona State	Goodwin Stadium; Tempe, AZ	L 6–62		
October 15	7:30 p.m.	Whittier*^{†}	Skidmore Field; Flagstaff, AZ	L 13–20		
October 22		at Redlands*	Redlands, CA	T 20–20		
November 5		West Texas State	Skidmore Field; Flagstaff, AZ	L 6–47		
November 12		at New Mexico A&M	Quesenberry Field; Las Cruces, NM	L 0–35		
*Non-conference game; ^{†}Homecoming; All times are in Mountain time
