= 1949 San Francisco State Gators football team =

American college football season

1949 San Francisco State Gators football
- Conference: Far Western Conference
- Record: 3–4–1 (1–2–1 FWC)
- Head coach: Dick Boyle (7th season)
- Home stadium: Cox Stadium

1949 Far Western Conference football standings
	Conf.					Overall
Team	W		L		T	W		L		T
Cal Aggies $	4	–	0	–	0	5	–	4	–	0
Southern Oregon	2	–	1	–	1	5	–	2	–	1
San Francisco State	1	–	2	–	1	3	–	4	–	1
Chico State	1	–	2	–	1	2	–	6	–	1
Humboldt State	0	–	3	–	1	0	–	8	–	1
$ – Conference champion

The 1949 San Francisco State Gators football team represented San Francisco State College—now known as San Francisco State University—as a member of the Far Western Conference (FWC) during the 1949 college football season. Under the leadership of head coach Dick Boyle in his seventh and final season, San Francisco State Gators recorded an overall record of 3–4–1 and a conference record of 1–2–1 play, tying for third place in the FWC. Throughout the season, the team was outscored by their opponents 218 to 114. The Gators played their home games at Cox Stadium in San Francisco.

== Schedule ==
Date	Opponent	Site	Result	Attendance	Source
October 1	at Whittier*	Hadley Field; Whittier, CA	L 0–60	5,000	
October 7	Southern Oregon	Cox Stadium; San Francisco, CA	T 21–21		
October 15	at Chico State	Chico High School Stadium; Chico, CA	L 6–19		
October 22	at Cal Poly*	Mustang Stadium; San Luis Obispo, CA	L 0–33		
October 29	at Humboldt State	Redwood Bowl; Arcata, CA	W 26–20		
November 5	Cal Aggies	Cox Stadium; San Francisco, CA	L 13–31		
November 11	Occidental*	Cox Stadium; San Francisco, CA	W 13–7		
November 18	La Verne*	Cox Stadium; San Francisco, CA	W 35–27		
*Non-conference game
