= Chuck Pavelko =

American football player and coach (born 1915)

Biographical details
- Born: August 2, 1915; Tacoma, Washington, U.S.
- Died: May 31, 2012; Del Mar, California, U.S.

Playing career
- 1935–1937: Santa Clara
- 1938–1939: Los Angeles Bulldogs
- 1940: Hollywood Bears
- Positions: Quarterback, halfback, punter

Coaching career (HC unless noted)
- 1947: Cal Poly (assistant)
- 1948–1949: Cal Poly

Head coaching record
- Overall: 7–11

Charles August Pavelko (August 2, 1915 – May 31, 2012) was an American football player and coach. He was a quarterback and punter for a very successful football team at Santa Clara University in the mid-1930s. He served as the head football coach at California Polytechnic State University in San Luis Obispo, California from 1948 to 1949, compiling a record of 7–11.

== Head coaching record ==
Year	Team	Overall	Conference	Standing	Bowl/playoffs
Cal Poly Mustangs (California Collegiate Athletic Association) (1948–1949)
1948	Cal Poly	3–5	1–4	T–5th	
1949	Cal Poly	4–6	1–3	T–3rd	
Cal Poly:		7–11	2–7		
Total:		7–11			
