= 1949 San Diego State Aztecs football team =

American college football season

1949 San Diego State Aztecs football
- Conference: California Collegiate Athletic Association
- Record: 6–3 (3–1 CCAA)
- Head coach: Bill Schutte (3rd season)
- Home stadium: Aztec Bowl

1949 California Collegiate Athletic Association football standings
	Conf.					Overall
Team	W		L		T	W		L		T
San Jose State $	4	–	0	–	0	9	–	4	–	0
San Diego State	3	–	1	–	0	6	–	3	–	0
Cal Poly	1	–	3	–	0	4	–	6	–	0
Fresno State	1	–	3	–	0	3	–	8	–	0
Santa Barbara	1	–	3	–	0	2	–	7	–	0
$ – Conference champion

The 1949 San Diego State Aztecs football team represented San Diego State College (Note: San Diego State University was known as San Diego State College from 1935 to 1971.) during the 1949 college football season.

San Diego State competed in the California Collegiate Athletic Association (CCAA). The team was led by third-year head coach Bill Schutte, and played home games at both Aztec Bowl and Balboa Stadium. They finished the season with six wins and three losses (6–3, 3–1 CCAA). Overall, the team was outscored by its opponents 195–200 for the season.

== Schedule ==
Date	Opponent	Site	Result	Attendance	Source
October 1	at Pepperdine*	Sentinel Field; Inglewood, CA	W 9–7	6,000	
October 8	Pomona*	Aztec Bowl; San Diego, CA	W 33–13	8,000	
October 15	New Mexico A&M*	Aztec Bowl; San Diego, CA	W 39–18	8,000	
October 22	at Pacific (CA)*	Baxter Stadium; Stockton, CA	L 14–62	8,000	
October 29	Loyola (CA)*	Balboa Stadium; San Diego, CA	L 20–34	18,000	
November 5	at Fresno State	Ratcliffe Stadium; Fresno, CA (rivalry)	W 18–7	7,500	
November 12	San Jose State	Aztec Bowl; San Diego, CA	L 0–40	8,500	
November 19	Cal Poly	Aztec Bowl; San Diego, CA	W 40–19	5,000	
November 24	Santa Barbara^{†}	Aztec Bowl; San Diego, CA	W 22–0	5,500–6,000	
*Non-conference game; ^{†}Homecoming

== Team players in the NFL ==
No San Diego State players were selected in the 1950 NFL draft.

The following finished their San Diego State career in 1949, were not drafted, but played in the NFL.

Player	Position	First NFL Team
Tom Dahms	Tackle	Los Angeles Rams
