= 1949 Santa Clara Broncos football team =

American college football season

1949 Santa Clara Broncos football

Orange Bowl champion

Orange Bowl, W 21–13 vs. Kentucky
- Conference: Independent

Ranking
- AP: No. 15
- Record: 8–2–1
- Head coach: Len Casanova (4th season)
- Home stadium: Kezar Stadium

1949 Western college football independents records
	Conf.			Overall
Team	W	L	T	W		L		T
No. 10 Pacific (CA)		–		11	–	0	–	0
Oregon College		–		9	–	0	–	0
No. 15 Santa Clara		–		8	–	2	–	1
San Francisco		–		7	–	3	–	0
Idaho State		–		6	–	2	–	1
Hawaii		–		6	–	3	–	0
La Verne		–		5	–	3	–	2
Loyola (CA)		–		6	–	4	–	0
Nevada		–		5	–	5	–	0
Pepperdine		–		4	–	5	–	0
Saint Mary's		–		3	–	6	–	1
Portland		–		3	–	5	–	0
Cal Poly San Dimas		–		2	–	8	–	0
Rankings from AP Poll

The 1949 Santa Clara Broncos football team was an American football team that represented Santa Clara University as an independent during the 1949 college football season. In their fourth season under head coach Len Casanova, the Broncos compiled an 8–2–1 record, achieved a No. 15 ranking in the final AP Poll, and outscored all opponents by a total of 222 to 114.

The Broncos' victories included a 14–0 besting of UCLA, a 19–6 victory over Saint Mary's, and a 21–13 victory over Bear Bryant's Kentucky Wildcats in the 1950 Orange Bowl. The team's two losses came against Pacific Coast Conference champion California (ranked No. 3 in the final AP Poll) and undefeated Oklahoma (ranked No. 2 in the AP Poll).

Guard Vern Sterling was selected by both the Associated Press and International News Service as a first-team player on the 1949 All-Pacific Coast football team.

After the 1949 season, coach Casanova left Santa Clara to become head coach at Pittsburgh. He also served as head coach at Oregon from 1951 to 1966.

== Schedule ==
Date	Opponent	Rank	Site	Result	Attendance	Source
September 18	at California		California Memorial Stadium; Berkeley, CA	L 7–21	62,000	
September 24	at San Jose State		Spartan Stadium; San Jose, CA	W 14–13	13,500	
October 1	at Fresno State		Ratcliffe Stadium; Fresno, CA	W 53–0	10,324	
October 9	Portland		Grape Bowl; Lodi, CA	W 26–13		
October 15	at No. 13 UCLA		Los Angeles Memorial Coliseum; Los Angeles, CA	W 14–0	28,911	
October 23	at Loyola (CA)		Sacramento, CA	W 27–19	9,500	
October 29	at Stanford		Stanford Stadium; Stanford, CA	T 7–7	45,000	
November 5	San Francisco		Kezar Stadium; San Francisco, CA	W 13–7	40,000	
November 13	at Saint Mary's	No. 20	Kezar Stadium; San Francisco, CA	W 19–6	37,640	
November 19	at No. 2 Oklahoma	No. 19	Oklahoma Memorial Stadium; Norman, OK	L 21–28	59,000–60,145	
January 2	vs. No. 20 Kentucky	No. 14	Burdine Stadium; Miami, FL (Orange Bowl)	W 21–13	64,816	
Rankings from AP Poll released prior to the game

== Rankings ==
Ranking movements Legend: ██ Increase in ranking ██ Decrease in ranking — = Not ranked т = Tied with team above or below
	Week								
Poll	1	2	3	4	5	6	7	8	Final
AP	—	—	—	—	—	20	19т	14	15

== After the season ==
The following Broncos were selected in the 1950 NFL draft after the season.

Round	Pick	Player	Position	NFL club
2	19	Hall Haynes	Back	Washington Redskins
8	99	John Hock	Tackle	Chicago Cardinals
8	101	Ellery Williams	End	San Francisco 49ers
13	165	Jerry Hennessy	End	Chicago Cardinals
14	179	Tom Payne	End	San Francisco 49ers
22	286	Jim Dowling	Guard	Cleveland Browns
