= 1949 Kansas State Wildcats football team =

American college football season

1949 Kansas State Wildcats football
- Conference: Big Seven Conference
- Record: 2–8 (1–5 Big 7)
- Head coach: Ralph Graham (2nd season)
- Home stadium: Memorial Stadium

1949 Big Seven Conference football standings
	Conf.					Overall
Team	W		L		T	W		L		T
No. 2 Oklahoma $	5	–	0	–	0	11	–	0	–	0
No. 20 Missouri	5	–	1	–	0	7	–	4	–	0
Iowa State	3	–	3	–	0	5	–	3	–	1
Nebraska	3	–	3	–	0	4	–	5	–	0
Kansas	2	–	4	–	0	5	–	5	–	0
Colorado	1	–	4	–	0	3	–	7	–	0
Kansas State	1	–	5	–	0	2	–	8	–	0
$ – Conference champion; Rankings from AP Poll

The 1949 Kansas State Wildcats football team represented Kansas State University in the 1949 college football season. The team's head football coach was Ralph Graham in his second year. The Wildcats played their home games in Memorial Stadium. The Wildcats finished the season with a 2–8 record with a 1–5 record in conference play. They finished in last place in the Big Seven Conference. The Wildcats scored 191 points and gave up 257 points. The win against Colorado on 10/1/1949 snapped a 22-game conference losing streak.

Harold Robinson played football for Kansas State with an athletic scholarship in 1949, breaking the decades-long "color barrier" in Big Seven conference athletics, and also becoming the first ever African-American athlete on scholarship in the conference.

== Schedule ==
Date	Opponent	Site	Result	Attendance	Source
September 24	Fort Hays*	Memorial Stadium; Manhattan, KS	W 55–0	15,000	
October 1	Colorado	Memorial Stadium; Manhattan, KS (rivalry)	W 27–13	13,397	
October 8	Nebraska	Memorial Stadium; Manhattan, KS (rivalry)	L 6–13	17,000	
October 15	at Iowa State	Clyde Williams Field; Ames, IA (rivalry)	L 21–25	18,792	
October 22	at Memphis State*	Crump Stadium; Memphis, TN	L 14–21	10,000	
October 29	at Kansas	Memorial Stadium; Lawrence, KS (rivalry)	L 0–38	33,500	
November 5	No. 3 Oklahoma^{†}	Memorial Stadium; Manhattan, KS	L 0–39	18,500	
November 12	Oklahoma A&M*	Memorial Stadium; Manhattan, KS	L 14–26	13,000	
November 19	at Tulsa*	Skelly Stadium; Tulsa, OK	L 27–48	11,000	
November 24	at Missouri	Memorial Stadium; Columbia, MO	L 27–34	20,000	
*Non-conference game; ^{†}Homecoming; Rankings from AP Poll released prior to the game
