= 1949 Loyola Lions football team =

American college football season

1949 Loyola Lions football
- Conference: Independent
- Record: 6–4
- Head coach: Jordan Olivar (1st season)
- Home stadium: Gilmore Stadium

1949 Western college football independents records
	Conf.			Overall
Team	W	L	T	W		L		T
No. 10 Pacific (CA)		–		11	–	0	–	0
Oregon College		–		9	–	0	–	0
No. 15 Santa Clara		–		8	–	2	–	1
San Francisco		–		7	–	3	–	0
Idaho State		–		6	–	2	–	1
Hawaii		–		6	–	3	–	0
La Verne		–		5	–	3	–	2
Loyola (CA)		–		6	–	4	–	0
Nevada		–		5	–	5	–	0
Pepperdine		–		4	–	5	–	0
Saint Mary's		–		3	–	6	–	1
Portland		–		3	–	5	–	0
Cal Poly San Dimas		–		2	–	8	–	0
Rankings from AP Poll

The 1949 Loyola Lions football team was an American football team that represented Loyola University of Los Angeles (now known as Loyola Marymount University) as an independent during the 1949 college football season. In their first season under head coach Jordan Olivar, the Lions compiled a 6–4 record and outscored their opponents by a combined total of 230 to 226.

== Schedule ==
Date	Opponent	Site	Result	Attendance	Source
September 23	Pacific (CA)	Gilmore Stadium; Los Angeles, CA	L 0–52	8,500	
September 30	at San Francisco	Kezar Stadium; San Francisco, CA	L 12–27	12,000	
October 7	Fresno State	Gilmore Stadium; Los Angeles, CA	W 52–13	4,000	
October 16	Saint Mary's	Gilmore Stadium; Los Angeles, CA	L 14–27	7,000	
October 23	vs. Santa Clara	Sacramento, CA	L 19–27	9,500	
October 29	at San Diego State	Balboa Stadium; San Diego, CA	W 34–20	18,000	
November 4	Hardin–Simmons	Gilmore Stadium; Los Angeles, CA	W 39–35	10,200	
November 11	Nevada	Gilmore Stadium; Los Angeles, CA	W 13–12		
November 18	Pepperdine	Gilmore Stadium; Los Angeles, CA	W 20–6	11,800	
November 26	at Arizona State	Goodwin Stadium; Tempe, AZ	W 27–7	13,000	
