= 1949 Cal Aggies football team =

American college football season

1949 Cal Aggies football

FWC champion

Pear Bowl, L 15–33 vs. Pacific (OR)
- Conference: Far Western Conference
- Record: 5–4 (4–0 FWC)
- Head coach: Ted Forbes (1st season)
- Captain: Jim Anderson
- Home stadium: Aggie Field

1949 Far Western Conference football standings
	Conf.					Overall
Team	W		L		T	W		L		T
Cal Aggies $	4	–	0	–	0	5	–	4	–	0
Southern Oregon	2	–	1	–	1	5	–	2	–	1
San Francisco State	1	–	2	–	1	3	–	4	–	1
Chico State	1	–	2	–	1	2	–	6	–	1
Humboldt State	0	–	3	–	1	0	–	8	–	1
$ – Conference champion

The 1949 Cal Aggies football team represented the College of Agriculture at Davis—now known as the University of California, Davis—as a member of the Far Western Conference (FWC) during the 1949 college football season. Led by first-year head coach Ted Forbes, the Aggies compiled an overall record of 5–4 with a mark of 4–0 in conference play, winning the FWC title. As FWC champion, they were invited to a postseason bowl game, the Pear Bowl, played in Medford, Oregon, where they lost to the Pacific Badgers of Forest Grove, Oregon, co-champions of the Northwest Conference. The Cal Aggies were outscored by their opponents 160 to 138 for the season. They played home games in Davis, California, as the newly-opened Aggie Field, which was renamed Toomey Field in 1962.

== Schedule ==
Date	Time	Opponent	Site	Result	Source
October 1		at Occidental*	D.W. Patterson Field; Los Angeles, CA	L 0–26	
October 8		Stanford JV*	Aggie Field; Davis, CA	W 14–6	
October 15		at Humboldt State	Redwood Bowl; Arcata, CA	W 33–6	
October 22		Southern Oregon	Aggie Field; Davis, CA	W 14–13	
October 29		vs. Santa Barbara (Note: The game against Santa Barbara was part of an "All-UC Doubleheader" that was held annually from 1948 to 1963. The other game of the double-header was California vs. UCLA. The games were always held at the home stadium of either Cal or UCLA.)*	Los Angeles Memorial Coliseum; Los Angeles, CA	L 6–40	
November 5		at San Francisco State	Cox Stadium; San Francisco, CA	W 31–13	
November 11		Whittier*	Aggie Field; Davis, CA	L 13–20	
November 19		Chico State	Aggie Field; Davis, CA	W 12–3	
November 24	12:30 p.m.	vs. Pacific (OR)*	Medford Stadium; Medford, OR (Pear Bowl)	L 15–33	
*Non-conference game; All times are in Pacific time
