= 1949 San Jose State Spartans football team =

American college football season

1949 San Jose State Spartans football
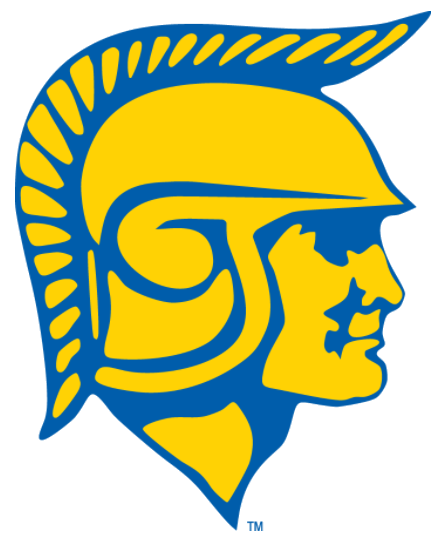

CCAA champion Raisin Bowl champion

Raisin Bowl, W 20–13 vs. Texas Tech
- Conference: California Collegiate Athletic Association
- Record: 9–4 (4–0 CCAA)
- Head coach: Wilbur V. Hubbard (4th season)
- Home stadium: Spartan Stadium

1949 California Collegiate Athletic Association football standings
	Conf.					Overall
Team	W		L		T	W		L		T
San Jose State $	4	–	0	–	0	9	–	4	–	0
San Diego State	3	–	1	–	0	6	–	3	–	0
Cal Poly	1	–	3	–	0	4	–	6	–	0
Fresno State	1	–	3	–	0	3	–	8	–	0
Santa Barbara	1	–	3	–	0	2	–	7	–	0
$ – Conference champion

The 1949 San Jose State Spartans football team represented San Jose State College (Note: San Jose State University was known as San Jose State College from 1935 to 1971.) during the 1949 college football season.

San Jose State competed in the California Collegiate Athletic Association. The team was led by head coach Wilbur V. Hubbard, in his fourth year, and played home games at Spartan Stadium in San Jose, California. They finished the season as champion of the CCAA with a record of nine wins and four losses (9–4, 4–0 CCAA). As champion, the Spartans were invited to the 1949 Raisin Bowl, played in Fresno, California. They defeated the Border Intercollegiate Athletic Association (Border Conference) champion Texas Tech Red Raiders in the game.

== Schedule ==
Date	Time	Opponent	Site	Result	Attendance	Source
September 10		University of Mexico*	Spartan Stadium; San Jose, CA	W 103–0	10,000	
September 17		at Stanford*	Stanford Stadium; Stanford, CA (rivalry)	L 0–49		
September 24		Santa Clara*	Spartan Stadium; San Jose, CA	L 13–14	13,500	
October 1		at BYU*	Cougar Stadium (Note: This stadium is the predecessor to the current Cougar Stadium on the BYU campus, which was opened for the 1964 season); Provo, UT	W 40–21		
October 7		Pepperdine*	Spartan Stadium; San Jose, CA	W 49–12		
October 14		San Francisco*	Spartan Stadium; San Jose, CA	L 20–27	14,162	
October 21	8:00 p.m.	Santa Barbara	Spartan Stadium; San Jose, CA	W 55–14	6,000	
October 28		Pacific (CA)*	Spartan Stadium; San Jose, CA (Victory Bell)	L 7–45	19,335	
November 4		at Cal Poly	Mustang Stadium; San Luis Obispo, CA	W 47–0	10,000	
November 12		at San Diego State	Aztec Bowl; San Diego, CA	W 40–0	8,500	
November 18		Saint Mary's*	Spartan Stadium; San Jose, CA	W 40–13	11,000	
November 24		at Fresno State	Ratcliffe Stadium; Fresno, CA (rivalry)	W 43–7	6,381	
December 31		vs. Texas Tech*	Ratcliffe Stadium; Fresno, CA (Raisin Bowl)	W 20–13	10,000	
*Non-conference game; All times are in Pacific time

== After the season ==
The following Broncos were selected in the 1950 NFL draft after the season.

Round	Pick	Player	Position	NFL club
11	141	Harley Dow	Tackle	San Francisco 49ers
15	190	Harry Russell	Back	Pittsburgh Steelers
22	283	Billy Wilson	End	San Francisco 49ers
28	363	Junior Morgan	End	Los Angeles Rams

The following finished their San Jose State career in 1949, were not drafted, but played in the NFL.

Player	Position	NFL club
Marvin Johnson	Defensive back – Halfback	Los Angeles Rams
