= 1949 Oregon College of Education Wolves football team =

American college football season

1949 Oregon College of Education Wolves football
- Conference: Independent
- Record: 9–0
- Head coach: Bill McArthur (3rd season)
- Home stadium: Fairgrounds Stadium

1949 Western college football independents records
	Conf.			Overall
Team	W	L	T	W		L		T
No. 10 Pacific (CA)		–		11	–	0	–	0
Oregon College		–		9	–	0	–	0
No. 15 Santa Clara		–		8	–	2	–	1
San Francisco		–		7	–	3	–	0
Idaho State		–		6	–	2	–	1
Hawaii		–		6	–	3	–	0
La Verne		–		5	–	3	–	2
Loyola (CA)		–		6	–	4	–	0
Nevada		–		5	–	5	–	0
Pepperdine		–		4	–	5	–	0
Saint Mary's		–		3	–	6	–	1
Portland		–		3	–	5	–	0
Cal Poly San Dimas		–		2	–	8	–	0
Rankings from AP Poll

The 1949 Oregon College of Education Wolves football team was an American football team that represented the Oregon College of Education (OCE), now known as Western Oregon University, as an independent during the 1949 college football season. In their third year under head coach Bill McArthur, the Wolves compiled a perfect 9–0 record, shut out five of nine opponents, and outscored all opponents by a total of 304 to 41. They closed the season as the only undefeated, untied team in the Pacific Northwest.

The team's leading players included halfback Robin Lee, quarterback Abe Johnson, back Aubrey "Corky" Van Loo, and center Jack "Butch" Langlie.

The team's 9–0 season remains the best record in the school's history. In 2004, the team was inducted into the Western Oregon Hall of Fame.

== Schedule ==
Date	Opponent	Site	Result	Attendance	Source
September 24	Whidby Island Navy	Monmouth, OR	W 39–0		
October 1	Linfield	Monmouth, OR	W 27–14		
October 8	George Fox	Monmouth, OR	W 20–0		
October 14	Vanport	Monmouth, OR	W 25–13		
October 22	at Oregon Tech	Modoc Field; Klamath Falls, OR	W 33–0		
October 29	Eastern Oregon^{†}	Fairgrounds Stadium; Monmouth, OR	W 33–0		
November 5	at Southern Oregon	Ashland, OR	W 30–7		
November 11	at Chico State	Chico High School Stadium; Chico, CA	W 43–7		
November 19	Humboldt State	Monmouth, OR	W 56–0		
^{†}Homecoming
