= 1949 Kansas Jayhawks football team =

American college football season

1949 Kansas Jayhawks football
- Conference: Big Seven Conference
- Record: 5–5 (2–4 Big 7)
- Head coach: Jules V. Sikes (2nd season)
- Captains: Forrest Griffith; Dick Tomlinson
- Home stadium: Memorial Stadium

1949 Big Seven Conference football standings
	Conf.					Overall
Team	W		L		T	W		L		T
No. 2 Oklahoma $	5	–	0	–	0	11	–	0	–	0
No. 20 Missouri	5	–	1	–	0	7	–	4	–	0
Iowa State	3	–	3	–	0	5	–	3	–	1
Nebraska	3	–	3	–	0	4	–	5	–	0
Kansas	2	–	4	–	0	5	–	5	–	0
Colorado	1	–	4	–	0	3	–	7	–	0
Kansas State	1	–	5	–	0	2	–	8	–	0
$ – Conference champion; Rankings from AP Poll

The 1949 Kansas Jayhawks football team represented the University of Kansas in the Big Seven Conference during the 1949 college football season. In their second season under head coach Jules V. Sikes, the Jayhawks compiled a 5–5 record (2–4 against conference opponents), finished fifth in the Big Seven Conference, and outscored all opponents by a combined total of 259 to 183. They played their home games at Memorial Stadium in Lawrence, Kansas.

The team's statistical leaders included Bud French with 510 rushing yards and 66 points scored, and Dick Gilman with 885 passing yards. Forrest Griffith and Dick Tomlinson were the team captains.

== Schedule ==
Date	Opponent	Site	Result	Attendance	Source
September 17	TCU*	Memorial Stadium; Lawrence, KS	L 0–28	32,000	
September 24	at Colorado	Folsom Field; Boulder, CO	L 12–13	22,095	
October 1	Iowa State	Memorial Stadium; Lawrence, KS	L 6–19	21,346	
October 8	George Washington*	Memorial Stadium; Lawrence, KS	W 21–14	18,000	
October 15	at No. 3 Oklahoma	Oklahoma Memorial Stadium; Norman, OK	L 26–48	37,660	
October 22	at Oklahoma A&M	Lewis Field; Stillwater, OK	W 55–14		
October 29	Kansas State	Memorial Stadium; Lawrence, KS (Sunflower Showdown)	W 38–0	33,500	
November 5	at Nebraska	Memorial Stadium; Lincoln, NE (rivalry)	W 27–13	36,500	
November 19	Missouri^{†}	Memorial Stadium; Lawrence, KS (Border War)	L 28–34		
November 26	at Arizona*	Arizona Stadium; Tucson, AZ	W 46–0	12,500	
*Non-conference game; ^{†}Homecoming; Rankings from Coaches' Poll released prior to the game

== After the season ==
The following Jayhawks were selected in the 1950 NFL draft following the season.

Round	Pick	Player	Position	NFL club
5	59	Forrest Griffith	Back	New York Giants
21	263	Bud French	Back	New York Bulldogs
21	268	Dick Tomlinson	Guard	Pittsburgh Steelers
27	344	Ed Lee	Tackle	Washington Redskins
