= 1949 Fresno State Bulldogs football team =

American college football season

1949 Fresno State Bulldogs football
- Conference: California Collegiate Athletic Association
- Record: 3–8 (2–3 CCAA)
- Head coach: Alvin Pierson (2nd season)
- Home stadium: Ratcliffe Stadium

1949 California Collegiate Athletic Association football standings
	Conf.					Overall
Team	W		L		T	W		L		T
San Jose State $	4	–	0	–	0	9	–	4	–	0
San Diego State	3	–	1	–	0	6	–	3	–	0
Cal Poly	1	–	3	–	0	4	–	6	–	0
Fresno State	1	–	3	–	0	3	–	8	–	0
Santa Barbara	1	–	3	–	0	2	–	7	–	0
$ – Conference champion

The 1949 Fresno State Bulldogs football team represented Fresno State College—now known as California State University, Fresno—as a member of the California Collegiate Athletic Association (CCAA) during the 1949 college football season. The team was led by head coach Alvin Pierson in his second one-year stint in the position. He had previously been head coach in 1945. The Bulldogs played home games at Ratcliffe Stadium on the campus of Fresno City College in Fresno, California. They finished the season with a record of three wins and eight losses (3–8, 1–3 CCAA). The Bulldogs were outscored 156–344 for the season.

== Schedule ==
Date	Opponent	Site	Result	Attendance	Source
September 24	Cal Poly	Ratcliffe Stadium; Fresno, CA	W 20–7	9,141	
October 1	Santa Clara*	Ratcliffe Stadium; Fresno, CA	L 0–53	10,324	
October 7	at Loyola (CA)*	Gilmore Stadium; Los Angeles, CA	L 13–52	4,000	
October 14	at Santa Barbara	La Playa Stadium; Santa Barbara, CA	L 7–14		
October 22	at Nevada*	Mackay Stadium (Note: This stadium is the predecessor to the current Mackay Stadium, which was opened for the 1966 season.); Reno, NV	L 13–34	6,500	
October 29	Naval Air Station Alameda (Note: Naval Air Station Alameda was a Naval Air Station from 1940 to 1997. For many years they fielded a team that played against colleges and other military teams.)*	Ratcliffe Stadium; Fresno, CA	W 55–30	2,583	
November 5	San Diego State	Ratcliffe Stadium; Fresno, CA (rivalry)	L 7–18	5,150	
November 11	Pepperdine*	Ratcliffe Stadium; Fresno, CA	W 20–7	4,729	
November 18	at Pacific (CA)*	Baxter Stadium; Stockton, CA	L 0–45	8,500	
November 24	San Jose State	Ratcliffe Stadium; Fresno, CA (rivalry)	L 7–43	6,381	
December 2	at Hawaii*	Honolulu Stadium; Honolulu, HI (rivalry)	L 14–41	20,000	
*Non-conference game

== Team players in the NFL ==
The following Fresno State Bulldogs were selected in the 1950 NFL draft.

Player	Position	Round	Overall	NFL Team
Bill Montgomery	Back	23	295	Chicago Cardinals
