= Emil Ladyko =

American football player and coach (1923–2011)

Biographical details
- Born: May 22, 1923; Bridgeport, Connecticut, U.S.
- Died: June 2, 2011 (aged 88); Bridgeport, Connecticut, U.S.
- Education: Columbia (1947)

Playing career
- 1944: Notre Dame
- 1945–1946: Columbia
- 1947: Philadelphia Eagles
- Position: End

Coaching career (HC unless noted)
- 1949: Arizona State–Flagstaff
- 1951: Colby (assistant)
- 1952–1957: Columbia (assistant)

Head coaching record
- Overall: 1–6–1

Emil S. Ladyko (May 22, 1923 – June 2, 2011) was an American football player and coach. He served as the head football coach at Arizona State Teachers College at Flagstaff—now known as Northern Arizona University—in 1949, compiling a record of 1–6–1.

Ladyko initially played college football at the University of Notre Dame in 1944. He later transferred to Columbia University and ultimately participated as an off-season member of the Philadelphia Eagles in 1947.

== Head coaching record ==
Year	Team	Overall	Conference	Standing	Bowl/playoffs
Arizona State–Flagstaff Lumberjacks (Border Conference) (1949)
1949	Arizona State–Flagstaff	1–6–1	0–3	9th	
Arizona State–Flagstaff:		1–6–1	0–3		
Total:		1–6–1			
