= 1949 Detroit Titans football team =

American college football season

1949 Detroit Titans football

MVC champion
- Conference: Missouri Valley Conference
- Record: 5–4 (4–0 MVC)
- Head coach: Chuck Baer (5th season)
- Captain: James E. Massey
- Home stadium: University of Detroit Stadium

1949 Missouri Valley Conference football standings
	Conf.					Overall
Team	W		L		T	W		L		T
Detroit $	4	–	0	–	0	5	–	4	–	0
Drake	3	–	1	–	0	6	–	2	–	1
Oklahoma A&M	2	–	1	–	1	4	–	4	–	2
Wichita	2	–	3	–	1	3	–	6	–	1
Tulsa	1	–	2	–	1	5	–	5	–	1
Bradley	1	–	3	–	0	5	–	5	–	0
Saint Louis	0	–	3	–	1	2	–	6	–	0
$ – Conference champion

The 1949 Detroit Titans football team represented the University of Detroit in the Missouri Valley Conference (MVC) during the 1949 college football season. In their fifth year under head coach Chuck Baer, the Titans compiled a 5–4 record (4–0 against conference opponents), won the MVC championship, and outscored all opponents by a combined total of 179 to 165. The 1949 season was Detroit's first in the MVC.

In addition to head coach Chuck Baer, the team's coaching staff included Bob Ivory (line coach, second year), Eddie Barbour (freshman coach and chief scout), Bill Hintz (freshman coach), and Dr. Raymond D. Forsyth (trainer). Fullback James E. Massey was the team captain.

== Schedule ==
Date	Opponent	Site	Result	Attendance	Source
September 23	Tulsa	University of Detroit Stadium; Detroit, MI	W 20–14	22,254	
September 30	Villanova*	University of Detroit Stadium; Detroit, MI	L 7–34	22,951	
October 7	San Francisco*	University of Detroit Stadium; Detroit, MI	L 14–38	16,648	
October 15	at Marquette*	Marquette Stadium; Milwaukee, WI	L 14–24	15,000	
October 21	Wayne*	University of Detroit Stadium; Detroit, MI	W 41–0	22,359	
October 28	Oklahoma A&M	University of Detroit Stadium; Detroit, MI	W 13–7	14,580	
November 4	at Miami (FL)*	Burdine Stadium; Miami, FL	L 6–27	35,031	
November 13	Saint Louis	University of Detroit Stadium; Detroit, MI	W 31–14	7,382	
November 24	at Wichita	Veterans Field; Wichita, KS	W 33–7	8,000	
*Non-conference game

== See also ==
- 1949 in Michigan
