= 1949 Texas Western Miners football team =

American college football season

1949 Texas Western Miners football

Sun Bowl, W 33–20 vs. Georgetown
- Conference: Border Conference
- Record: 8–2–1 (4–2 Border)
- Head coach: Jack Curtice (4th season)
- Home stadium: Kidd Field

1949 Border Conference football standings
	Conf.					Overall
Team	W		L		T	W		L		T
Texas Tech $	5	–	0	–	0	7	–	5	–	0
Arizona State	4	–	1	–	0	7	–	3	–	0
Texas Western	4	–	2	–	0	8	–	2	–	1
Hardin–Simmons	4	–	2	–	0	6	–	4	–	1
West Texas State	3	–	2	–	0	5	–	4	–	0
Arizona	2	–	4	–	0	2	–	7	–	1
New Mexico A&M	1	–	4	–	0	4	–	6	–	0
New Mexico	1	–	6	–	0	2	–	8	–	0
Arizona State–Flagstaff	0	–	3	–	0	1	–	6	–	1
$ – Conference champion

The 1949 Texas Western Miners football team was an American football team that represented Texas Western College (now known as University of Texas at El Paso) as a member of the Border Conference during the 1949 college football season. In its fourth season under head coach Jack Curtice, the team compiled an 8–2–1 record (4–2 against Border Conference opponents), finished third in the conference, defeated Georgetown in the 1950 Sun Bowl, and outscored all opponents by a total of 292 to 113.

== Schedule ==
Date	Opponent	Site	Result	Attendance	Source
September 17	at BYU*	Cougar Stadium; Provo, UT	W 47–6		
September 24	John Carroll*	Kidd Field; El Paso, TX	W 33–7	11,000	
October 1	Hawaii*	Kidd Field; El Paso, TX	W 14–7	15,000	
October 8	at West Texas State	Buffalo Stadium; Canyon, TX	W 34–7		
October 15	at Arizona	Arizona Stadium; Tucson, AZ	W 28–0	16,200	
October 22	New Mexico	Kidd Field; El Paso, TX	W 7–0	5,000	
October 29	at Hardin–Simmons	Parramore Field; Abilene, TX	L 14–33	8,000	
November 5	Texas Tech^{†}	Kidd Field; El Paso, TX	L 0–13	13,000	
November 12	at West Virginia*	Mountaineer Field; Morgantown, WV	T 13–13	10,000	
November 25	New Mexico A&M	Kidd Field; El Paso, TX	W 69–7	5,000	
January 2, 1950	vs. Georgetown*	Kidd Field; El Paso, TX (Sun Bowl)	W 33–20	15,000	
*Non-conference game; ^{†}Homecoming
