= 1949 Cal Poly San Dimas Broncos football team =

American college football season

1949 Cal Poly San Dimas Broncos football
- Conference: Independent
- Record: 2–8
- Head coach: Duane Whitehead (2nd season)

1949 Western college football independents records
	Conf.			Overall
Team	W	L	T	W		L		T
No. 10 Pacific (CA)		–		11	–	0	–	0
Oregon College		–		9	–	0	–	0
No. 15 Santa Clara		–		8	–	2	–	1
San Francisco		–		7	–	3	–	0
Idaho State		–		6	–	2	–	1
Hawaii		–		6	–	3	–	0
La Verne		–		5	–	3	–	2
Loyola (CA)		–		6	–	4	–	0
Nevada		–		5	–	5	–	0
Pepperdine		–		4	–	5	–	0
Saint Mary's		–		3	–	6	–	1
Portland		–		3	–	5	–	0
Cal Poly San Dimas		–		2	–	8	–	0
Rankings from AP Poll

The 1949 Cal Poly San Dimas Broncos football team represented the Cal Poly Kellogg-Voorhis Unit—now known as California State Polytechnic University, Pomona—as an independent during the 1949 college football season. Led by second-year head coach Duane Whitehead, Cal Poly San Dimas compiled a record of 2–8. The team was outscored by its opponents 172 to 82 for the season.

== Schedule ==
Date	Opponent	Site	Result	Source
September 16	at Santa Ana	Santa Ana Stadium; Santa Ana, CA	L 13–31	
September 23	at Napa	Napa, CA	L 0–10	
October 1	at Muir	Pasadena, CA?	L 6–20	
October 8	at Pierce	Canoga Park High School; Canoga Park, CA	W 17–7	
October 15	Redlands	Pomona, CA	L 0–7	
October 21	El Camino	San Dimas, CA?	L 0–26	
October 29	at La Verne	Bonita High School; La Verne, CA	L 2–7	
November 5	at Gila Junior College	Thatcher, AZ	L 7–12	
November 12	at Chaffey	Ontario, CA	L 0–40	
November 18	Caltech	Bonita High School; La Verne, CA	W 37–12	
