= 1949 Missouri Tigers football team =

American college football season

1949 Missouri Tigers football

Gator Bowl, L 7–20 vs. Maryland
- Conference: Big Seven Conference

Ranking
- AP: No. 20 (tie)
- Record: 7–4 (5–1 Big 7)
- Head coach: Don Faurot (12th season)
- Home stadium: Memorial Stadium

1949 Big Seven Conference football standings
	Conf.					Overall
Team	W		L		T	W		L		T
No. 2 Oklahoma $	5	–	0	–	0	11	–	0	–	0
No. 20 Missouri	5	–	1	–	0	7	–	4	–	0
Iowa State	3	–	3	–	0	5	–	3	–	1
Nebraska	3	–	3	–	0	4	–	5	–	0
Kansas	2	–	4	–	0	5	–	5	–	0
Colorado	1	–	4	–	0	3	–	7	–	0
Kansas State	1	–	5	–	0	2	–	8	–	0
$ – Conference champion; Rankings from AP Poll

The 1949 Missouri Tigers football team was an American football team that represented the University of Missouri in the Big Seven Conference (Big 7) during the 1949 college football season. The team compiled a 7–4 record (5–1 against Big 7 opponents), finished in second place in the Big 7, and outscored all opponents by a combined total of 264 to 225. Don Faurot was the head coach for the 12th of 19 seasons. The team played its home games at Memorial Stadium in Columbia, Missouri.

The team's statistical leaders included Dick Braznell with 766 rushing yards and 1,128 yards of total offense, Phil Klein with 808 passing yards, Gene Ackerman with 621 receiving yards, and John Glorioso with 77 points scored.

== Schedule ==
Date	Opponent	Rank	Site	Result	Attendance	Source
September 24	at Ohio State*		Ohio Stadium; Columbus, OH	L 34–35	66,510	
October 1	at SMU*		Cotton Bowl; Dallas, TX	L 27–28	58,000	
October 8	Oklahoma A&M	No. 20	Memorial Stadium; Columbia, MO	W 21–7		
October 15	at Illinois*		Memorial Stadium; Champaign, IL (rivalry)	W 27–20	42,184	
October 22	at Iowa State	No. 18	Clyde Williams Field; Ames, IA (rivlary)	W 32–0	17,232	
October 29	Nebraska	No. 16	Memorial Stadium; Columbia, MO (rivalry)	W 21–20		
November 5	at Colorado		Folsom Field; Boulder, CO	W 20–13	19,781	
November 12	No. 3 Oklahoma		Memorial Stadium; Columbia, MO (rivalry)	L 7–27	37,152	
November 19	at Kansas		Memorial Stadium; Lawrence, KS (Border War)	W 34–28		
November 24	Kansas State		Memorial Stadium; Columbia, MO	W 34–27	20,000	
January 2, 1950	vs. No. 14 Maryland		Gator Bowl Stadium; Jacksonville, FL (Gator Bowl)	L 7–20	18,409–22,000	
*Non-conference game; Rankings from AP Poll released prior to the game

== Rankings ==
Ranking movements Legend: ██ Increase in ranking ██ Decrease in ranking — = Not ranked т = Tied with team above or below
	Week								
Poll	1	2	3	4	5	6	7	8	Final
AP	20т	—	18	16	—	—	—	—	20т
