= 1949 Oklahoma Sooners football team =

American college football season

1949 Oklahoma Sooners football

National champion (BR, CFRA) Big 7 champion Sugar Bowl champion

Sugar Bowl, W 35–0 vs. LSU
- Conference: Big Seven Conference

Ranking
- AP: No. 2
- Record: 11–0 (5–0 Big 7)
- Head coach: Bud Wilkinson (3rd season)
- Captains: Jim Owens; Stan West
- Home stadium: Memorial Stadium

1949 Big Seven Conference football standings
	Conf.					Overall
Team	W		L		T	W		L		T
No. 2 Oklahoma $	5	–	0	–	0	11	–	0	–	0
No. 20 Missouri	5	–	1	–	0	7	–	4	–	0
Iowa State	3	–	3	–	0	5	–	3	–	1
Nebraska	3	–	3	–	0	4	–	5	–	0
Kansas	2	–	4	–	0	5	–	5	–	0
Colorado	1	–	4	–	0	3	–	7	–	0
Kansas State	1	–	5	–	0	2	–	8	–	0
$ – Conference champion; Rankings from AP Poll

The 1949 Oklahoma Sooners football team represented the University of Oklahoma in the 1949 college football season. In their third year under head coach Bud Wilkinson, the Sooners compiled an undefeated 11–0 record (5–0 against conference opponents), won the Big Seven Conference championship, were ranked No. 2 in the final AP poll, were named national champions by Football Research, and outscored their opponents by a combined total of 399 to 88.

Five Sooners received All-America honors in 1949: Jim Owens (end), Darrell Royal (quarterback), George Thomas (halfback), Wade Walker (tackle) and Stanley West (guard). The same five players also received all-conference honors.

== Schedule ==
Date	Opponent	Rank	Site	Result	Attendance	Source
September 23	at Boston College*	No. 3	Braves Field; Boston, MA	W 46–0	36,241	
October 1	Texas A&M*	No. 3	Memorial Stadium; Norman, OK	W 33–13	32,000–34,658	
October 8	vs. No. 12 Texas*	No. 3	Cotton Bowl; Dallas, TX (rivalry)	W 20–14	75,347	
October 15	Kansas	No. 3	Memorial Stadium; Norman, OK	W 48–26	37,660	
October 22	at Nebraska	No. 4	Memorial Stadium; Lincoln, NE (rivalry)	W 48–0	39,000	
October 29	Iowa State	No. 3	Memorial Stadium; Norman, OK	W 34–7	38,149	
November 5	at Kansas State	No. 3	Memorial Stadium; Manhattan, KS	W 39–0	18,500	
November 12	at Missouri	No. 3	Memorial Stadium; Columbia, MO (rivalry)	W 27–7	37,152	
November 19	vs. No. 19 Santa Clara*	No. 2	Memorial Stadium; Norman, OK	W 28–21	59,000–60,145	
November 26	Oklahoma A&M*	No. 3	Memorial Stadium; Norman, OK (Bedlam)	W 41–0	47,937	
January 1, 1950	No. 9 LSU*	No. 2	Tulane Stadium; New Orleans, LA (Sugar Bowl)	W 35–0	82,000	
*Non-conference game; Rankings from AP Poll released prior to the game

== Rankings ==
Ranking movements Legend: ██ Increase in ranking ██ Decrease in ranking ( ) = First-place votes
	Week								
Poll	1	2	3	4	5	6	7	8	Final
AP	3 (17)	3 (28)	4 (6)	3 (10)	3 (11)	3 (9)	2 (15)	3 (11)	2 (18)

== Roster ==
- Claude Arnold
- QB Darrell Royal (#11)
- Gene Heape
- Marion Allgood

=== NFL draft ===
Six Sooners were selected in the 1950 NFL draft, held in January.

Round	Pick	Player	Position	NFL team
1	6	George Thomas	Back	Washington Redskins
1	12	Stan West	Guard	Los Angeles Rams
7	82	Leon Manley	Guard	Green Bay Packers
14	177	Dee Andros	Guard	Chicago Cardinals
20	250	Darrell Royal	Back	New York Yanks
21	265	George Brewer	Back	Detroit Lions

- End Jim Owens was selected in the 1949 NFL draft.
