= 1949 Iowa State Cyclones football team =

American college football season

1949 Iowa State Cyclones football
- Conference: Big Seven Conference
- Record: 5–3–1 (3–3 Big 7)
- Head coach: Abe Stuber (3rd season)
- Captain: Dean Laun
- Home stadium: Clyde Williams Field

1949 Big Seven Conference football standings
	Conf.					Overall
Team	W		L		T	W		L		T
No. 2 Oklahoma $	5	–	0	–	0	11	–	0	–	0
No. 20 Missouri	5	–	1	–	0	7	–	4	–	0
Iowa State	3	–	3	–	0	5	–	3	–	1
Nebraska	3	–	3	–	0	4	–	5	–	0
Kansas	2	–	4	–	0	5	–	5	–	0
Colorado	1	–	4	–	0	3	–	7	–	0
Kansas State	1	–	5	–	0	2	–	8	–	0
$ – Conference champion; Rankings from AP Poll

The 1949 Iowa State Cyclones football team represented Iowa State College of Agricultural and Mechanic Arts (later renamed Iowa State University) in the Big Seven Conference during the 1949 college football season. In their third year under head coach Abe Stuber, the Cyclones compiled a 5–3–1 record (3–3 against conference opponents), tied for third place in the conference, and outscored their opponents by a combined total of 169 to 134. They played their home games at Clyde Williams Field in Ames, Iowa.

The team's regular starting lineup consisted of left end Dean Laun, left tackle Lowell Titus, left guard Joe Brubaker, center Rod Rust, right guard Billy Myers, right tackle John Tillo, right end Jim Doran, quarterback Don Ferguson, left halfback Lawrence Paulson, right halfback Bob Angle, and fullback Bill Chauncey. Dean Laun was the team captain.

The team's statistical leaders included Bill Chauncey with 544 rushing yards and 30 points scored (five touchdowns), Bill Weeks with 1,247 passing yards, Jim Doran with 688 receiving yards, and Bob Angle with 18 points (three touchdowns). Three Iowa State players were selected as first-team all-conference players: Doran, Weeks, and Lowell Titus.

== Schedule ==
Date	Time	Opponent	Site	Result	Attendance
September 17	2:00 pm	Dubuque*	Clyde Williams Field; Ames, IA	W 64–0	6,951
September 24	12:30 pm	at Illinois*	Memorial Stadium; Champaign, IL	T 20–20	31,883
October 1	2:00 pm	Kansas	Clyde Williams Field; Ames, IA	W 19–6	21,346
October 8	3:00 pm	at Colorado	Folsom Field; Boulder, CO	W 13–6	16,234
October 15	2:00 pm	Kansas State^{†}	Clyde Williams Field; Ames, IA (rivalry)	W 25–21	18,792
October 22	2:00 pm	No. 18 Missouri	Clyde Williams Field; Ames, IA (rivalry)	L 0–32	17,232
October 29	2:30 pm	at No. 3 Oklahoma	Oklahoma Memorial Stadium; Norman, OK	L 7–34	38,149
November 5	2:00 pm	at Drake*	Drake Stadium; Des Moines, IA	W 21–8	18,311
November 12	2:00 pm	Nebraska	Clyde Williams Field; Ames, IA (rivalry)	L 0–7	13,558
*Non-conference game; ^{†}Homecoming; Rankings from AP Poll released prior to the game; All times are in Central time
