= 1949 Wichita Shockers football team =

American college football season

1949 Wichita Shockers football
- Conference: Missouri Valley Conference
- Record: 3–6–1 (2–3–1 MVC)
- Head coach: Jim Trimble (2nd season)
- Home stadium: Veterans Field

1949 Missouri Valley Conference football standings
	Conf.					Overall
Team	W		L		T	W		L		T
Detroit $	4	–	0	–	0	5	–	4	–	0
Drake	3	–	1	–	0	6	–	2	–	1
Oklahoma A&M	2	–	1	–	1	4	–	4	–	2
Wichita	2	–	3	–	1	3	–	6	–	1
Tulsa	1	–	2	–	1	5	–	5	–	1
Bradley	1	–	3	–	0	5	–	5	–	0
Saint Louis	0	–	3	–	1	2	–	6	–	0
$ – Conference champion

The 1949 Wichita Shockers football team was an American football team that represented Wichita University (now known as Wichita State University) as a member of the Missouri Valley Conference during the 1949 college football season. In its first season under head coach Jim Trimble, the team compiled a 3–6–1 record (2–3–1 against conference opponents), finished fourth out of seven teams in the MVC, and outscored opponents by a total of 212 to 211. The team played its home games at Veterans Field, now known as Cessna Stadium.

== Schedule ==
Date	Opponent	Site	Result	Attendance	Source
September 24	Miami (OH)*	Veterans Field; Wichita, KS	L 6–23		
October 1	at Houston*	Public School Stadium; Houston, TX	L 6–26	8,000	
October 8	Bradley	Veterans Field; Wichita, KS	W 21–13		
October 15	at Nevada*	Mackay Stadium; Reno, NV	L 7–20		
October 22	Northern State*	Veterans Field; Wichita, KS	W 91–0		
October 29	at Tulsa	Skelly Stadium; Tulsa, OK	W 27–21		
November 5	at Saint Louis	Walsh Stadium; St. Louis, MO	T 21–21		
November 12	Drake	Veterans Field; Wichita, KS	L 6–7		
November 19	at Oklahoma A&M	Lewis Field; Stillwater, OK	L 20–47		
November 24	Detroit	Veterans Field; Wichita, KS	L 7–33	8,000	
*Non-conference game
