= Art Bergstrom =

American college football coach

Biographical details
- Died: 2006

Playing career
- 1924–1927: Illinois College

Coaching career (HC unless noted)
- 1930–1931: Casey HS (IL)
- 1932–1935: Monticello HS (IL)
- 1936–1946: Libertyville HS (IL)
- 1947: Stephen Decatur HS (IL)
- 1948–1950: Bradley

Administrative career (AD unless noted)
- 1948–1956: Bradley
- 1957: NCAA (compliance office)

Head coaching record
- Overall: 15–14 (college)

Art Bergstrom (died 2006) was an American football player and coach and collegiate athletic director. He served as the head football coach at Bradley University in Peoria, Illinois from 1948 to 1950. He also served as Bradley's athletic director from 1948 to 1956 before taking a job in the compliance office at the National Collegiate Athletic Association (NCAA).

== Head coaching record ==
=== College ===
Year	Team	Overall	Conference	Standing	Bowl/playoffs
Bradley Braves (Independent) (1948)
1948	Bradley	5–4			
Bradley Braves (Missouri Valley Conference) (1949–1950)
1949	Bradley	5–5	1–3	6th	
1950	Bradley	5–5	0–3	6th	
Bradley:		15–14	1–6		
Total:		15–14			
