= 1949 Oklahoma A&M Cowboys football team =

American college football season

1949 Oklahoma A&M Cowboys football
- Conference: Missouri Valley Conference
- Record: 4–4–2 (1–2–1 MVC)
- Head coach: Jim Lookabaugh (11th season)
- Home stadium: Lewis Field

1949 Missouri Valley Conference football standings
	Conf.					Overall
Team	W		L		T	W		L		T
Detroit $	4	–	0	–	0	5	–	4	–	0
Drake	3	–	1	–	0	6	–	2	–	1
Oklahoma A&M	2	–	1	–	1	4	–	4	–	2
Wichita	2	–	3	–	1	3	–	6	–	1
Tulsa	1	–	2	–	1	5	–	5	–	1
Bradley	1	–	3	–	0	5	–	5	–	0
Saint Louis	0	–	3	–	1	2	–	6	–	0
$ – Conference champion

The 1949 Oklahoma A&M Cowboys football team represented Oklahoma Agricultural and Mechanical College (later renamed Oklahoma State University–Stillwater) in the Missouri Valley Conference during the 1949 college football season. In their 11th and final year under head coach Jim Lookabaugh, the Cowboys compiled a 4–4–2 record (1–2–1 against conference opponents), finished in third place in the conference, and outscored opponents by a combined total of 223 to 212.

On offense, the 1949 team averaged 22.3 points, 151.5 rushing yards, and 177.7 passing yards per game. On defense, the team allowed an average of 21.2 points, 158.3 rushing yards and 213.3 passing yards per game. The team's statistical leaders included halfback Ken Roof with 466 rushing yards, Jack Hartman with 1,278 passing yards, Alex Loyd with 657 receiving yards, and Don Van Pool with 36 points scored.

Four Oklahoma A&M players received first-team All-Missouri Valley Conference honors in 1949: tackle Charles Shaw, guard Clayton Davis, end Alex Loyd, and back Jack Hartman.

The team played its home games at Lewis Field in Stillwater, Oklahoma.

== Schedule ==
Date	Opponent	Site	Result	Attendance	Source
September 24	at TCU*	Amon G. Carter Stadium; Fort Worth, TX	T 33–33		
October 1	at Denver*	Hilltop Stadium; Denver, CO	W 48–2	> 20,000	
October 8	at No. 20 Missouri*	Memorial Stadium; Columbia, MO	L 7–21		
October 15	Drake	Lewis Field; Stillwater, OK	W 28–0		
October 22	Kansas*^{†}	Lewis Field; Stillwater, OK	L 14–55		
October 28	at Detroit*	University of Detroit Stadium; Detroit, MI	L 7–20	4,580	
November 5	Tulsa	Lewis Field; Stillwater, OK (rivalry)	T 13–13	15,500	
November 12	at Kansas State*	Memorial Stadium; Manhattan, KS	W 26–14		
November 19	Wichita	Lewis Field; Stillwater, OK	W 47–20		
November 26	at No. 3 Oklahoma*	Memorial Stadium; Norman, OK (Bedlam Series)	L 0–41	47,937	
*Non-conference game; ^{†}Homecoming; Rankings from AP Poll released prior to the game

== After the season ==
The 1950 NFL draft was held on January 20–21, 1950. The following Cowboys were selected.

Round	Pick	Player	Position	NFL club
6	68	Ben Aldridge	Back	New York Bulldogs
6	75	Don Van Pool	End	San Francisco 49ers
12	154	Kenny Roof	Back	Chicago Bears
13	162	Clay Davis	Center	Washington Redskins
15	188	Alex Loyd	End	Washington Redskins
16	205	Charley Shaw	Guard	San Francisco 49ers
30	382	Rube DeRoin	Center	Cleveland Browns
