= 1949 Texas Tech Red Raiders football team =

American college football season

1949 Texas Tech Red Raiders football

Border champion

Raisin Bowl, L 13–20 vs. San Jose State
- Conference: Border Conference
- Record: 7–5 (5–0 Border)
- Head coach: Dell Morgan (9th season)
- Offensive scheme: Single-wing
- Base defense: 6–2
- Home stadium: Jones Stadium

1949 Border Conference football standings
| | Conf. | | | | | Overall |
| Team | W | | L | | T | W | | L | | T |
|---|---|---|---|---|---|---|---|---|---|---|
| Texas Tech $ | 5 | – | 0 | – | 0 | 7 | – | 5 | – | 0 |
| Arizona State | 4 | – | 1 | – | 0 | 7 | – | 3 | – | 0 |
| Texas Western | 4 | – | 2 | – | 0 | 8 | – | 2 | – | 1 |
| Hardin–Simmons | 4 | – | 2 | – | 0 | 6 | – | 4 | – | 1 |
| West Texas State | 3 | – | 2 | – | 0 | 5 | – | 4 | – | 0 |
| Arizona | 2 | – | 4 | – | 0 | 2 | – | 7 | – | 1 |
| New Mexico A&M | 1 | – | 4 | – | 0 | 4 | – | 6 | – | 0 |
| New Mexico | 1 | – | 6 | – | 0 | 2 | – | 8 | – | 0 |
| Arizona State–Flagstaff | 0 | – | 3 | – | 0 | 1 | – | 6 | – | 1 |
$ – Conference champion

The 1949 Texas Tech Red Raiders football team represented Texas Technological College—now known as Texas Tech University—as a member of the Border Conference during the 1949 college football season. Led by ninth-year head coach Dell Morgan, the Red Raiders compiled an overall record of 7–5 with a mark of 5–0 in conference play, winning the Border Conference title for the third consecutive year. Texas Tech was invited to the Raisin Bowl, where they lost to San Jose State.

== Schedule ==
| Date | Opponent | Site | Result | Attendance | Source |
|---|---|---|---|---|---|
| September 10 | Abilene Christian* | Jones Stadium; Lubbock, TX | W 20–0 | 10,500 | |
| September 17 | at Texas* | Memorial Stadium; Austin, TX (rivalry) | L 0–43 | 28,000 | |
| September 24 | vs. Texas A&M* | Alamo Stadium; San Antonio, TX (rivalry) | L 7–26 | 19,740 | |
| October 1 | West Texas State | Jones Stadium; Lubbock, TX | W 35–19 | 16,800 | |
| October 8 | Tulsa* | Jones Stadium; Lubbock, TX | W 15–0 | 13,000–15,000 | |
| October 15 | No. 20 Baylor*^{†} | Jones Stadium; Lubbock, TX (rivalry) | L 7–28 | 18,000–19,000 | |
| October 22 | Arizona | Jones Stadium; Lubbock, TX | W 27–7 | 9,000 | |
| October 29 | at No. 5 Rice* | Rice Field; Houston, TX | L 0–28 | 18,000 | |
| November 5 | at Texas Western | Kidd Field; El Paso, TX | W 13–0 | 13,000 | |
| November 19 | at New Mexico | Zimmerman Field; Albuquerque, NM | W 27–0 | 10,000 | |
| November 26 | Hardin–Simmons | Jones Stadium; Lubbock, TX | W 23–13 | 15,500 | |
| December 31 | vs. San Jose State* | Ratcliffe Stadium; Fresno, CA (Raisin Bowl) | L 13–20 | 10,000 | |
*Non-conference game; ^{†}Homecoming; Rankings from AP Poll released prior to the game
