= 1949 West Texas State Buffaloes football team =

American college football season

1949 West Texas State Buffaloes football
- Conference: Border Conference
- Record: 5–4 (3–2 Border)
- Head coach: Frank Kimbrough (3rd season)
- Home stadium: Buffalo Stadium

1949 Border Conference football standings
	Conf.					Overall
Team	W		L		T	W		L		T
Texas Tech $	5	–	0	–	0	7	–	5	–	0
Arizona State	4	–	1	–	0	7	–	3	–	0
Texas Western	4	–	2	–	0	8	–	2	–	1
Hardin–Simmons	4	–	2	–	0	6	–	4	–	1
West Texas State	3	–	2	–	0	5	–	4	–	0
Arizona	2	–	4	–	0	2	–	7	–	1
New Mexico A&M	1	–	4	–	0	4	–	6	–	0
New Mexico	1	–	6	–	0	2	–	8	–	0
Arizona State–Flagstaff	0	–	3	–	0	1	–	6	–	1
$ – Conference champion

The 1949 West Texas State Buffaloes football team was an American football team that represented West Texas State College (now known as West Texas A&M University) in the Border Conference during the 1949 college football season. In its third season under head coach Frank Kimbrough, the team compiled a 5–4 record (3–2 against conference opponents) and outscored opponents by a total of 249 to 170.

== Schedule ==
Date	Opponent	Site	Result	Attendance	Source
September 17	East Texas State*	Buffalo Stadium; Canyon, TX	W 41–7		
September 24	McMurry*	Buffalo Stadium; Canyon, TX	L 7–34		
October 1	at Texas Tech	Jones Stadium; Lubbock, TX	L 19–35	16,800	
October 8	Texas Western	Buffalo Stadium; Canyon, TX	L 7–34		
October 15	at Houston*	Public School Stadium; Houston, TX	L 13–14	6,000	
October 22	Trinity (TX)*	Buffalo Stadium; Canyon, TX	W 55–20	7,000	
November 5	at Arizona State–Flagstaff	Skidmore Field; Flagstaff, AZ	W 47–6		
November 12	Hardin–Simmons	Buffalo Stadium; Canyon, TX	W 19–7		
November 26	at New Mexico	Zimmerman Field; Albuquerque, NM	W 41–13		
*Non-conference game
