= 1949 Arizona Wildcats football team =

American college football season

1949 Arizona Wildcats football
- Conference: Border Conference
- Record: 2–7–1 (2–4 Border)
- Head coach: Bob Winslow (1st season)
- Captains: Max Spilsbury; Roy Rivenburg
- Home stadium: Arizona Stadium

1949 Border Conference football standings
	Conf.					Overall
Team	W		L		T	W		L		T
Texas Tech $	5	–	0	–	0	7	–	5	–	0
Arizona State	4	–	1	–	0	7	–	3	–	0
Texas Western	4	–	2	–	0	8	–	2	–	1
Hardin–Simmons	4	–	2	–	0	6	–	4	–	1
West Texas State	3	–	2	–	0	5	–	4	–	0
Arizona	2	–	4	–	0	2	–	7	–	1
New Mexico A&M	1	–	4	–	0	4	–	6	–	0
New Mexico	1	–	6	–	0	2	–	8	–	0
Arizona State–Flagstaff	0	–	3	–	0	1	–	6	–	1
$ – Conference champion

The 1949 Arizona Wildcats football team represented the University of Arizona in the Border Conference during the 1949 college football season. In their first season under head coach Bob Winslow, the Wildcats compiled a 2–7–1 record (2–4 against Border opponents) and were outscored by opponents, 298 to 118. The team captains were Max Spilsbury and Roy Rivenburg. The team played its home games in Arizona Stadium in Tucson, Arizona.

== Schedule ==
Date	Opponent	Site	Result	Attendance	Source
September 24	New Mexico A&M	Arizona Stadium; Tucson, AZ	W 40–7	14,000	
October 1	Utah*	Arizona Stadium; Tucson, AZ	T 12–12	15,500	
October 8	at Hardin–Simmons	Parramore Field; Abilene, TX	L 0–35	8,000	
October 15	Texas Western	Arizona Stadium; Tucson, AZ	L 0–28	16,200	
October 22	at Texas Tech	Jones Stadium; Lubbock, TX	L 7–27	9,000	
October 29	at Denver*	Hilltop Stadium; Denver, CO	L 6–20	13,259	
November 5	New Mexico^{†}	Arizona Stadium; Tucson, AZ (rivalry)	W 46–14	13,200	
November 12	at Arizona State	Goodwin Stadium; Tempe, AZ (rivalry)	L 7–34	18,000	
November 19	No. 18 Michigan State*	Arizona Stadium; Tucson, AZ	L 0–75	16,000	
November 26	Kansas*	Arizona Stadium; Tucson, AZ	L 0–46	12,500	
*Non-conference game; ^{†}Homecoming; Rankings from AP Poll released prior to the game
