= 1949 Raisin Bowl (December) =

Texas Tech Red Raiders	San Jose State Spartans
(7–4)	(8–4)
13	20
Head coach: Dell Morgan	Head coach: Wilbur V. Hubbard
	1	2	3	4	Total
Texas Tech	7	0	0	6	13
San Jose State	0	7	13	0	20
- Date: December 31, 1949
- Season: 1949
- Stadium: Ratcliffe Stadium
- Location: Fresno, California
- Referee: C. Martin Welch
- Attendance: 10,000

The 1949 Raisin Bowl (December) was an American college football bowl game played on December 31, 1949 at Ratcliffe Stadium in Fresno, California. The game pitted the San Jose State Spartans and the Texas Tech Red Raiders. This was the fifth and final Raisin Bowl played.

== Background ==
San Jose State won eight games in the regular season, though they were invited to their second bowl game in four seasons. Texas Tech finished as champion of the Border Intercollegiate Athletic Association for the third straight year and fourth in seven years (with no champion awarded from 1943–45). This was their fifth bowl game in 11 years.

== Game summary ==
- Texas Tech - Hatch 1 yard run
- San Jose State - Wilson 30 yard pass from Menges
- San Jose State - Donaldson 11 yard run
- San Jose State - Donaldson 5 yard run
- Texas Tech - Stuver 76 yard run

In a game that started and ended with fog, San Jose State pulled through with quick scoring to win their second ever bowl game.

Statistics	Texas Tech	San Jose State
First downs	13	13
Rushing yards	254	170
Passing yards	88	131
Total offense	342	301
Passing	4–12–3	9–16–1
Fumbles–lost	3–2	3–1
Penalties–yards	1–5	5–27
Return yards	99	131
Punts–average	4–39.7	5–33.8

== Aftermath ==
With the win, San Jose State had won nine games for the fourth straight season. They did not win 9 games again until 1975. Incidentally, they did not reach a bowl game until the Pasadena Bowl in 1971 and a major bowl game until 1981. Texas Tech returned to a bowl game in 1952, which they won for their first ever win in school history.
