= 1949 San Francisco Dons football team =

American college football season

1949 San Francisco Dons football
- Conference: Independent
- Record: 7–3
- Head coach: Joe Kuharich (2nd season)
- Home stadium: Kezar Stadium

1949 Western college football independents records
	Conf.			Overall
Team	W	L	T	W		L		T
No. 10 Pacific (CA)		–		11	–	0	–	0
Oregon College		–		9	–	0	–	0
No. 15 Santa Clara		–		8	–	2	–	1
San Francisco		–		7	–	3	–	0
Idaho State		–		6	–	2	–	1
Hawaii		–		6	–	3	–	0
La Verne		–		5	–	3	–	2
Loyola (CA)		–		6	–	4	–	0
Nevada		–		5	–	5	–	0
Pepperdine		–		4	–	5	–	0
Saint Mary's		–		3	–	6	–	1
Portland		–		3	–	5	–	0
Cal Poly San Dimas		–		2	–	8	–	0
Rankings from AP Poll

The 1949 San Francisco Dons football team was an American football team that represented the University of San Francisco as an independent during the 1949 college football season. In their second season under head coach Joe Kuharich, the Dons compiled a 7–3 record and outscored their opponents by a combined total of 260 to 144.

== Schedule ==
Date	Opponent	Site	Result	Attendance	Source
September 17	at Pacific (CA)	Grape Bowl; Lodi, CA	L 6–7	18,000	
September 25	St. Bonaventure	Kezar Stadium; San Francisco	W 34–21		
September 30	Loyola (CA)	Kezar Stadium; San Francisco	W 27–12		
October 7	at Detroit	University of Detroit Stadium; Detroit	W 38–14	16,648	
October 14	at San Jose State	Spartan Stadium; San Jose, CA	W 27–20	14,162	
October 23	Saint Mary's	Kezar Stadium; San Francisco	W 41–14	38,000	
October 30	Nevada	Kezar Stadium; San Francisco	W 41–13	18,000	
November 6	Santa Clara	Kezar Stadium; San Francisco	L 7–13	40,000	
November 12	at Tulsa	Skelly Stadium; Tulsa, OK	L 0–10	7,000	
November 20	Marquette	Kezar Stadium; San Francisco	W 39–20	12,000	
