= Harry Wright (American football) =

American football player and coach (1919–1993)

Biographical details
- Born: October 4, 1919; New York, New York, U.S.
- Died: March 9, 1993 (aged 73); Hackensack, New Jersey, U.S.

Playing career
- 1940–1942: Notre Dame
- Position: Quarterback

Coaching career (HC unless noted)
- 1946–1948: Aquinas Institute (NY)
- 1949: Portland
- 1958–1963: Merchant Marine
- 1964–1966: New York Giants (off. backfield)

Administrative career (AD unless noted)
- 1949: Portland

Head coaching record
- Overall: 35–28–1 (college)

Accomplishments and honors

Awards
- Second-team All-American (1942)

Harry Charles Wright (October 4, 1919 – March 9, 1993) was an American football player and coach. He played college football at the University of Notre Dame, quarterbacking the 1941 Notre Dame Fighting Irish football team to an undefeated record. Wright served as the head football coach at the University of Portland in 1949 and the United States Merchant Marine Academy from 1958 to 1963, compiling a career college football coaching record of 35–28–1. He also worked an assistant coach for the New York Giants of the National Football League (NFL) from 1964 to 1966 under head coach Allie Sherman. Wright was later the mayor of Sparta Township, New Jersey.
