= 1949 Saint Louis Billikens football team =

American college football season

1949 Saint Louis Billikens football
- Conference: Missouri Valley Conference
- Record: 2–6–1 (0–3–1 MVC)
- Head coach: Joe Maniaci (2nd season)
- Home stadium: Edward J. Walsh Memorial Stadium

1949 Missouri Valley Conference football standings
	Conf.					Overall
Team	W		L		T	W		L		T
Detroit $	4	–	0	–	0	5	–	4	–	0
Drake	3	–	1	–	0	6	–	2	–	1
Oklahoma A&M	2	–	1	–	1	4	–	4	–	2
Wichita	2	–	3	–	1	3	–	6	–	1
Tulsa	1	–	2	–	1	5	–	5	–	1
Bradley	1	–	3	–	0	5	–	5	–	0
Saint Louis	0	–	3	–	1	2	–	6	–	0
$ – Conference champion

The 1949 Saint Louis Billikens football team was an American football team that represented Saint Louis University as a member of the Missouri Valley Conference (MVC) during the 1949 college football season. In its second season under head coach Joe Maniaci, the team compiled a 2–6–1 record (0–3–1 against MVC opponents), finished in last place in the conference, and was outscored by a total of 214 to 172. The team played its home games at Walsh Stadium in St. Louis.

== Schedule ==
Date	Opponent	Site	Result	Attendance	Source
September 30	Kirksville State*	Edward J. Walsh Memorial Stadium; St. Louis, MO	W 48–6		
October 8	at Marquette*	Marquette Stadium; Milwaukee, WI	L 7–62		
October 15	Davidson*	Edward J. Walsh Memorial Stadium; St. Louis, MO	W 41–12	6,743	
October 22	at Drake	Drake Stadium; Des Moines, IA	L 14–27		
October 29	at Duquesne*	Forbes Field; Pittsburgh, PA	L 14–51	7,500–8,000	
November 5	Wichita	Edward J. Walsh Memorial Stadium; St. Louis, MO	T 21–21		
November 13	at Detroit	University of Detroit Stadium; Detroit, MI	L 14–31	7,382	
November 19	Bradley	Edward J. Walsh Memorial Stadium; St. Louis, MO	L 7–29		
November 24	Houston*	Edward J. Walsh Memorial Stadium; St. Louis, MO	L 0–35	6,387–6,823	
*Non-conference game
