= 1949 Hawaii Rainbows football team =

American college football season

1949 Hawaii Rainbows football

Pineapple Bowl, L 20–74 vs. Stanford
- Conference: Independent
- Record: 6–3
- Head coach: Tom Kaulukukui (5th season)
- Home stadium: Honolulu Stadium

1949 Western college football independents records
	Conf.			Overall
Team	W	L	T	W		L		T
No. 10 Pacific (CA)		–		11	–	0	–	0
Oregon College		–		9	–	0	–	0
No. 15 Santa Clara		–		8	–	2	–	1
San Francisco		–		7	–	3	–	0
Idaho State		–		6	–	2	–	1
Hawaii		–		6	–	3	–	0
La Verne		–		5	–	3	–	2
Loyola (CA)		–		6	–	4	–	0
Nevada		–		5	–	5	–	0
Pepperdine		–		4	–	5	–	0
Saint Mary's		–		3	–	6	–	1
Portland		–		3	–	5	–	0
Cal Poly San Dimas		–		2	–	8	–	0
Rankings from AP Poll

The 1949 Hawaii Rainbows football team represented the University of Hawaiʻi as an independent during the 1949 college football season. In their fifth season under head coach Tom Kaulukukui, the Rainbows compiled a 6–3 record.

== Schedule ==
Date	Opponent	Site	Result	Attendance	Source
September 23	Mōʻiliʻili Cards	Honolulu Stadium; Honolulu, Territory of Hawaii	W 59–6	9,000	
October 1	at Texas Western	Kidd Field; El Paso, TX	L 7–14	15,000	
October 7	at Denver	Hilltop Stadium; Denver, CO	W 27–14	15,000	
October 28	Islanders	Honolulu Stadium; Honolulu, Territory of Hawaii	W 98–7	5,500	
November 4	Mōʻiliʻili Cards	Honolulu Stadium; Honolulu, Territory of Hawaii	W 34–0	2,500	
November 11	Leilehua	Honolulu Stadium; Honolulu, Territory of Hawaii	W 76–6	2,000	
December 2	Fresno State	Honolulu Stadium; Honolulu, Territory of Hawaii (rivalry)	W 41–14	15,000	
December 16	No. 10 Pacific (CA)^{†}	Honolulu Stadium; Honolulu, Territory of Hawaii	L 0–75	28,000	
January 1, 1950	Stanford	Honolulu Stadium; Honolulu, Territory of Hawaii (Pineapple Bowl)	L 20–74	20,000	
^{†}Homecoming; Rankings from AP Poll released prior to the game
