= 1949 Cal Poly Mustangs football team =

American college football season

1949 Cal Poly Mustangs football
- Conference: California Collegiate Athletic Association
- Record: 4–6 (1–3 CCAA)
- Head coach: Chuck Pavelko (2nd season)
- Home stadium: Mustang Stadium

1949 California Collegiate Athletic Association football standings
	Conf.					Overall
Team	W		L		T	W		L		T
San Jose State $	4	–	0	–	0	9	–	4	–	0
San Diego State	3	–	1	–	0	6	–	3	–	0
Cal Poly	1	–	3	–	0	4	–	6	–	0
Fresno State	1	–	3	–	0	3	–	8	–	0
Santa Barbara	1	–	3	–	0	2	–	7	–	0
$ – Conference champion

The 1949 Cal Poly Mustangs football team represented California Polytechnic State College—now known as California Polytechnic State University, San Luis Obispo—as a member of the California Collegiate Athletic Association (CCAA) during the 1949 college football season. Led by head coach Chuck Pavelko in his second and final season. As head coach, Cal Poly compiled an overall record of 4–6 with a mark of 1–3 in conference play, tying for third place in the CCAA. The Mustangs played home games at Mustang Stadium in San Luis Obispo, California.

== Schedule ==
Date	Time	Opponent	Site	Result	Attendance	Source
September 17		University of Mexico*	Mustang Stadium; San Luis Obispo, CA	W 42–2		
September 24		at Fresno State	Ratcliffe Stadium; Fresno, CA	L 7–20	10,000	
October 1		at Redlands*	Redlands Stadium (Note: This stadium is the predecessor to the current Ted Runner Stadium on the University of Redlands campus, which was opened for the 1968 season); Redlands, CA	L 0–7		
October 15		Occidental*	Mustang Stadium; San Luis Obispo, CA	L 7–20		
October 22		San Francisco State*	Mustang Stadium; San Luis Obispo, CA	W 33–0		
October 29	8:00 p.m.	at Whittier*	Hadley Field; Whittier, CA	W 19–0	6,000	
November 4		San Jose State	Mustang Stadium; San Luis Obispo, CA	L 0–47	10,000	
November 11		Santa Barbara^{†}	Mustang Stadium; San Luis Obispo, CA	W 7–0	4,000	
November 19		at San Diego State	Aztec Bowl; San Diego, CA	L 19–40	5,000	
November 24		No. 11 Pacific (CA)*	Mustang Stadium; San Luis Obispo, CA	L 0–88	4,000	
*Non-conference game; ^{†}Homecoming; Rankings from AP Poll released prior to the game; All times are in Pacific time
