= Jimmy DeAngelis =

American football player and coach (1910–2007)

Biographical details
- Born: October 20, 1910; Hamden, Connecticut, U.S.
- Died: December 26, 2007 (aged 97); Wallingford, Connecticut, U.S.

Playing career

Football
- 1932–1934: Yale
- Position: Linebacker/Center

Coaching career (HC unless noted)

Football
- 1935–1937: Yale (Freshmen)
- 1938–1940: Yale (JV)
- 1941: Bates (Assistant)
- 1945–1947: Yale (Freshmen)
- 1948: Yale (Assistant)
- 1949: Toledo (Line)
- 1950: Nebraska (Line)
- 1951–1952: Washington (Line)

Men's basketball
- 1941–1942: Bates

Mariano Vincenzo "Jimmy" DeAngelis (October 20, 1910 – December 26, 2007) was an American football player and coach. He was a member of the Yale's 1934 "Ironmen" football team that upset an undefeated Princeton team.

== Early life ==
DeAngelis was born in Hamden, Connecticut. His father was a bricklayer and stonemason and his mother was a factory worker. After graduating from Hillhouse High School, DeAngelis worked for a local telephone company until Clarence Blakeslee, the head of a New Haven construction company, paid for his tuition to the Milford Academy. He then attended Yale University, where he was a member of the football and basketball teams. He played center and linebacker for the 1934 Yale Bulldogs football team, which upset Princeton 7–0. DeAngelis had two key tackles in the game; stopping Ken Sandbach at the two-yard line on the opening kickoff and tackling Homer Spofford 2 yards short of the end zone during the first of four goal-line stands. He graduated from Yale in 1935 with a bachelor of science degree.

== Coaching ==
From 1935 to 1937, DeAngelis was Yale's freshman football coach. In 1938, he became the team's junior varsity coach. In 1941, DeAngelis followed Yale head coach Ducky Pond to Bates College. In addition to serving as an assistant football coach, DeAngelis was also the school's head basketball coach and freshman baseball coach. In 1942, DeAngelis left Bates to enter the United States Navy. He was commissioned as a lieutenant junior grade and assigned to the University of North Carolina, where he worked as a physical fitness instructor of aviation cadets.

After the war, DeAngelis resumed his coaching career at Yale. He was freshman coach from 1945 to 1947. In 1948, he was the line coach for the Toledo Rockets football team. The following season, he took the same position with the Nebraska Cornhuskers. In 1950, he joined the staff of former Yale head coach Howie Odell at the University of Washington.

== Later life ==
In 1953, DeAngelis returned to Connecticut, where he worked as a sales manager. He retired in 1991 and spent the last decade of his life living in a retirement community in Wallingford, Connecticut. He died on December 26, 2007 at the age of 97.
