= List of college football head coaches with non-consecutive tenure =

This is a list of college football head coaches with non-consecutive tenure, meaning that an individual was a head coach at a college or university for a period, departed, and then returned to the same college or university in the same capacity.

This list includes only head coaches. This list does not include the following:

- Head coaches whose break in tenure was due to a temporarily suspended football program with no other coach during the break in tenure. Most such cases involve programs that halted play for World War I (including the flu pandemic linked to that conflict), World War II, or COVID-19. Another recent example is Bill Clark, former head coach at UAB. UAB dropped football after his first season at the school in 2014, but announced six months later that it would reinstate the sport, eventually resuming play in 2017. Clark was under contract to UAB throughout the program's hiatus.
- Coaches who left and returned to an administrative capacity in the title of "head coach" but did not coach any games, such as when Tom Osborne temporarily named himself head coach while athletic director for the Nebraska Cornhuskers until Bo Pelini was hired in 2007.
- Coaches whose break in tenure was due to a medical or personal leave, with no new permanent head coach having been hired. A recent example is Joe Moglia, head coach at Coastal Carolina from 2012 to 2018. He went on a medical leave shortly before the 2017 season, and returned to coaching in 2018. During the 2017 season, offensive coordinator Jamey Chadwell was interim head coach, but was not hired as the permanent replacement at that time; he would succeed Moglia after the latter retired after the 2018 season.
- Coaches who were hired as interim head coaches while the permanent head coach was on a personal or medical leave, such as Chadwell.

Several College Football Hall of Fame coaches have made the list, accenting not only their return to the same program but the success their return brought to the program. Critics have pointed out that returning coaches appear to be less successful at producing winning teams and programs during their second tenure and make comparisons to previous records of coaches attempting to return to a prior coaching job.

Head coach	Team	Tenure	Notes
Eli Abbott	Alabama	1893–1895, 1902	
A. A. Abraham	Alcorn State	1936, 1938, 1941–1942	
Hobbs Adams	Kansas State	1940–1941, 1946	
Bob Agler	Otterbein	1955–1965, 1970–1974	
Jack Alexander	Brevard	1940, 1948	
George E. Allen	Maine	1941, 1946–1948	
William Allen	Washington State	1900, 1902	
Barry Alvarez	Wisconsin	1990–2005, 2012, 2014	Alvarez, who stepped down from coaching after the 2005 season to concentrate on his second role as athletic director and entered the College Football Hall of Fame in 2010, has been interim coach for two Wisconsin bowl games after the Badgers' head coach left for another school. He coached in the 2013 Rose Bowl (part of the 2012 season) after Bret Bielema left to take the head coaching vacancy at Arkansas, and the 2015 Outback Bowl (part of the 2014 season) following Gary Andersen's departure for the Oregon State vacancy (though Alvarez coached the bowl game in 2015).
Gary Andersen	Utah State	2009–2012, 2019–2020	
Carl "Swede" Anderson	Western Kentucky	1929, 1934–1937	
Chester Anderson	Bemidji State	1955–1960, 1962–1965	
Eddie Anderson	Holy Cross	1933–1938, 1950–1964	Member of the College Football Hall of Fame. Coached six years at Holy Cross in the 1930s, moved on to Iowa which he interrupted to serve in the U.S. Army. He then returned first to Iowa then to Holy Cross for 13 seasons.
Eddie Anderson	Iowa	1939–1942, 1946–1949	Member of the College Football Hall of Fame. Coached six years at Holy Cross in the 1930s, moved on to Iowa which he interrupted to serve in the U.S. Army. He then returned first to Iowa then to Holy Cross for 13 seasons.
Bob Andrews	Brevard	1946–1947, 1949–1950	
Houston Arbogast	Brevard	1925, 1927	
Phillip Arbuckle	Rice	1912–1917, 1919–1923	
Samuel Archer	Morehouse	1905–1908, 1912–1915	
Bo Atterberry	Southeastern Oklahoma State	2014–2018, 2023–present	
Chris Ault	Nevada	1976–1992, 1994–1995, 2004–2012	Stepped down and returned twice during his tenure at Nevada, each time to focus on his (now-relinquished) second role as athletics director. Ault was inducted into the College Football Hall of Fame in 2002, during his second break in tenure.
David Austin	Middlebury	1903–1904, 1907–1908	
Cory Bailey	Assumption	2004–2007, 2009–2012	
Willard Bailey	Virginia Union	1971–1983, 1995–2003	
Boydson Baird	Maryville	1959–1963, 1970	
Ed Baker	Kalamazoo	1967–1983, 1988–1989	
Edward Baker	Carnegie Tech	1940–1942, 1949–1959	School is now known as Carnegie Mellon.
William C. Baker	Chadron State	1955, 1957–1961	
George Baldwin	Kutztown	1973–1983, 1985–1987	
D. M. Balliet	Purdue	1893–1895, 1901	
Laurence Bankart	Colgate	1910, 1913–1916	
Harry E. Barco	Virginia Union	1903, 1911–1912	
T. L. Bayne	Tulane	1893, 1895	
Ernest Bearg	Washburn	1918–1919, 1929–1935	
Matty Bell	SMU	1935–1941, 1945–1949	
Joe Benda	Saint John's (MN)	1930–1936, 1941–1942, 1945–1949	
John R. Bender	Washington State	1906–1907, 1912–1914	
Christie Benet	South Carolina	1904–1905, 1908–1909	
Curt Bennett	Sterling	1966–1973, 1981, 1997–2000	
Harry Newsham Bentz	Shippensburg	1924–1925, 1927–1928	
Martin V. Bergen	Grinnell	1894–1895, 1902–1903, 1905	Served as co-head coach with Tuffy Fisk in 1905
Hugo Bezdek	Oregon	1906, 1913–1917	
Bernie Bierman	Minnesota	1932–1941, 1945–1950	
Jack Bishop	Southern Utah	1978–1982, 1986–1995	
Gene Bissell	Kansas Wesleyan	1952–1961, 1963–1978	
C. P. Blakeslee	Minnesota State	1924–1931, 1933–1934	
J. Merrell Blanchard	William & Mary	1904–1905, 1910	
Bill Bloss	Oregon State	1893, 1897	
Branch Bocock	Virginia Tech	1909–1910, 1912–1915	
Branch Bocock	William & Mary	1928–1930, 1936–1938	
Stanley Borleske	North Dakota State	1919–1921, 1923–1924, 1928	Co-head coach with Casey Finnegan in 1928
Robert E. Bowles	William Jewell	1913–1926, 1933–1936	
Jerry Boyes	Buffalo State	1986–2000, 2009–2018	
Jimmy Bradshaw	Fresno State	1936–1942, 1946	Fresno State did not play in 1943, but resumed in 1944.
Jubie Bragg	Florida A&M	1907–1925, 1930	Team did not play from 1910 until 1919 and again in 1924. FAMU's current stadium bears his name.
Sidney O. Brandon	Campbell	1927–1928, 1932–1934, 1946	
Chester Brewer	Michigan State	1903–1910, 1917, 1919	Michigan State played its 1918 season.
Arthur W. Briggs	Missouri State	1912, 1914–1917, 1919–1933	Missouri State, then known as the Fourth District Normal School, played in 1918.
John Briley	Augustana (IL)	1941–1942, 1946	
Eugene Brodhagen	Winona State	1946–1950, 1952–1954	
Reuben Bronson	Idaho State	1915–1916, 1919	Idaho State played in 1917, but not in 1918.
Joseph W. Brooks	Williams	1916, 1919–1920	
Charles H. Brown	Birmingham-Southern	1916, 1919–1923	
Don Brown	UMass	2004–2008, 2022–2024	
John Brown	Alabama State	1943, 1945–1948	Alabama State played in 1944.
Mack Brown	North Carolina	1988–1997, 2019–2024	
George Buchheit	Bloomsburg	1932–1935, 1940–1941, 1945	
Matthew Bullock	UMass (Note: School then athletically known as "Massachusetts", though the term "UMass" was in wide use for most if not all of the 20th century.)	1904, 1907–1908	
Luther Burleson	Hardin-Simmons	1913, 1918	
Derrick Burroughs	Lane	2010–2013, 2015–2019	
Samuel D. Burton	West Texas A&M	1921–1924, 1931–1932	
Perrin Busbee	North Carolina State	1892, 1896–1897	
Henry Butova	American International	1948, 1952–1955	
Johnny Cain	Louisiana (Note: Then known as Southwestern Louisiana.)	1937–1941, 1946	
L. Jay Caldwell	Colgate	1893, 1895	
Walter Camp	Stanford	1892, 1894–1895	
V. M. Campbell	Memphis (Note: Then known as West Tennessee, from its formal name of West Tennessee Normal School.)	1917, 1919	Memphis played in 1918.
Mike Canales	North Texas	2010, 2015	Canales served as interim head coach of the Mean Green for their last 5 games in 2010, and again for their last 7 games in 2015.
Jack Cannell	Dartmouth	1921–1922, 1929–1933	
William L. Carberry	Northern State	1933–1939, 1942–1945	Team did not play in 1943 and 1944 due to WWII.
Roger Caron	Pomona–Pitzer	1994–2004, 2007–2016	
Gilbert Carson	Eastern Illinois	1936–1937, 1939–1941	
Marino Casem	Southern	1987–1988, 1992	
Frank Casey	Simpson	1935–1939, 1942–1947	
Joe Bailey Cheaney	Howard Payne	1928–1934, 1946–1947	
Ade Christenson	St. Olaf	1929–1942, 1946–1948, 1951–1957	
Harvey Chrouser	Wheaton (IL)	1940–1941, 1946–1960	
William W. Church	Georgetown	1899, 1901	
George Clark	Nebraska	1945, 1948	
Heze Clark	Rose-Hulman	1908–1911, 1923–1927	
Louis Clark	Dayton	1913, 1917–1918	
Tom Clark	Catholic	1994–2000, 2004–2005	
Edward Clemons	Edward Waters	1929–1932, 1965	33 years between coaching periods
Roy Clogston	St. Lawrence	1938–1941, 1946–1947	
George Cobb	Rhode Island	1909–1911, 1913–1914	
Jasper Colebank	Fairmont State	1924–1932, 1934–1939	
Bill Cooke	Missouri Southern	1988, 2000–2003	Was interim coach in 1988
Gerald Coonan	Wisconsin-Superior	1913, 1917	
Duaine Counsell	Wisconsin-Stevens Point	1957–1965, 1967–1968	
Dean Cromwell	USC	1909–1910, 1916–1918	
H. P. Cross	Stanford	1896, 1898	
Shannon Currier	Concordia–St. Paul	2000–2003, 2016–present	Team did not play in 2020 due to COVID-19
Charles Dudley Daly	Army	1913–1916, 1919–1922	
Bill Davis	Savannah State	1986–1992, 2000–2001	
Mark Dean	Indiana State	1951–1954, 1956	
James DeHart	Washington & Lee	1922–1925, 1931–1932	
Frank Dennie	Missouri S&T	1909–1911, 1915–1917	
Hugh Devore	Notre Dame	1945, 1963	
Oliver Morton Dickerson	Western Illinois	1906, 1910	
Marvin D. Dickinson	Georgia	1903, 1905	
Chester C. Dillon	Samford (Note: Then known as Howard College, or Howard (Alabama) to distinguish from Howard University in Washington, D.C.)	1919, 1927–1928	
Chester C. Dillon	Jacksonville State	1938–1939, 1945	
Sam Doak	Tusculum	1919–1921, 1928–1936	
Frank Dobson	Richmond	1913–1917, 1919–1933	
Mike Donahue	Auburn	1904–1906, 1908–1922	
George Donges	Ashland	1935–1937, 1945–1953	
James C. Donnelly	WPI	1909, 1911, 1915	
Hubert R. Doubs	Fayetteville State	1959–1962, 1966–1969	
Ben Douglas	Grinnell	1940–1941, 1946	
Sidney Drew	Hope	1916, 1918	
Don Drumm	Marietta	1912–1916, 1942	26 years between coaching periods
Moon Ducote	Spring Hill	1919, 1921–1922, 1933–1934	
E. C. Duggins	Appalachian State	1947–1950, 1952–1955	
Mike Dunbar	Central Washington	1983, 1987–1991	
E. A. Dunlap	Richmond	1905–1909, 1912	
John Dunlop	Boston College	1897–1899, 1901	
Joe Dupaix	Southern Virginia	2009–2013, 2022–present	
Ron Dupree	Kansas Wesleyan	1979–1980, 1996	
Schubert R. Dyche	Montana State	1928–1935, 1938–1941	
Thomas Eck	Massachusetts	1945, 1947–1951	
Randy Edsall	UConn (Note: Officially known for athletic purposes as Connecticut until 2013, though "UConn" was in regular use during Edsall's first tenure.)	1999–2010, 2017–2021	
George R. Edwards	Kansas Wesleyan	1914, 1917	
Jake Eldridge	Montana State–Northern	2014, 2017	Was interim head coach for the entire 2014 season and for the final 3 games of the 2017 season.
Larry Elliott	Washburn	1974–1978, 1984–1989	
Harry Ely	Fordham	1892, 1903	
Homer Englund	South Dakota Mines	1959–1960, 1962	
Rex Enright	South Carolina	1938–1942, 1946–1955	
Dennis Erickson	Idaho	1982–1985, 2006	21 years between coaching periods
Dan Estes	Central Arkansas	1915–1916, 1919–1932	
Harry W. Ewing	Otterbein	1935–1938, 1942–1945, 1951–1954	
Jack Faber	Maryland	1935, 1940–1941	
Dave Fagg	Davidson	1970–1973, 1990–1992	
Don Fambrough	Kansas	1971–1974, 1979–1982	
George M. Farley	Nebraska Wesleyan	1935–1936, 1941–1942	
Wells Farley	Maine	1901, 1903	
Don Faurot	Missouri	1935–1942, 1946–1956	
John Fenlon	Richmond	1942, 1946–1947	
Jim Fenwick	Eastern Oregon	2002–2003, 2005	
A. R. Ferguson	Hastings	1912–1914, 1917–1918	
Stewart Ferguson	Arkansas-Monticello	1934, 1938–1941	
Carl Ferrill	New Mexico Highlands	1996–1998, 2006	
Lou Ferry	Villanova	1970–1973, 1974	Ferry served as interim head coach for the final 3 games in 1974
Doug Fessenden	Montana	1935–1941, 1946–1948	
Charles A. Fisher	Lebanon Valley	1899, 1901	
Red Floyd	Middle Tennessee	1917, 1935–1938	
Ed Foley	Temple	2016, 2018	Foley was interim head coach for two Temple appearances in bowl games, the 2016 Military Bowl after Matt Rhule left for Baylor and the 2018 Independence Bowl after Geoff Collins left for Georgia Tech.
Fred Folsom	Colorado	1895–1899, 1901–1902, 1908–1915	
Frank Forbes	Morehouse	1932–1933, 1935–1942, 1945–1949	
Ted Forbes	UC Davis	1949–1953, 1955	
Dixon Foster	South Carolina	1917, 1919	
Dennis Franchione	Texas State	1990–91, 2011–2015	20 years between coaching periods
John Edmund Fries	Carroll (WI)	1914–1918, 1920	
Scott Frost	UCF	2016–2017, 2025–present	
Thomas B. Fullerton	Emory and Henry	1915–1916, 1920–1926	
Phillip Fulmer	Tennessee	1992, 1993–2008	Fulmer was named interim head coach for the first three games of the 1992 season in Johnny Majors' absence. He returned to his position as offensive coordinator upon Majors' return. Following Majors' resignation after the season, Fulmer was promoted to head coach.
John Fuhrer	Pittsburg State	1909–1914, 1918	
Mike Furrey	Limestone	2016–2017, 2022–present	
Glen Galligan	Winona State	1927–1933, 1935	
J. A. Gammons	Brown	1902, 1908–1909	
Mike Gardner	Tabor	2004–2005, 2010–present	
Frank Gargan	Fordham	1916, 1922–1926	
Wix Garner	Western Illinois	1942–1943, 1945–1947	
Al Garten	Eastern New Mexico	1936–1937, 1939–1953	Team did not play from 1942 until 1944 due to WWII.
Rufus Gilbert	Kalamazoo	1905, 1907–1908	
Rufus Gilbert	Rose-Hulman	1915, 1917–1920	
W. J. Gobrecht	Dickinson	1965–1979, 1984	Was interim head coach in 1984
Ernie Godfrey	Wittenberg	1916, 1919–1928	
Milton Goering	Bethel (KS)	1954–1956, 1958–1959	
Otto Graham	Coast Guard	1959–1965, 1974–1975	
Paul Graham	RPI	1920–1926, 1942–1945	Went 16 years between coaching stints
Ralph Graham	Wichita State (Note: Then known as Wichita, from its formal name of Municipal University of Wichita.)	1942, 1946–1947	
Artis P. Graves	Morris Brown	1940, 1944–1949	
B. C. Graves	Sul Ross	1923–1925, 1927–1939	
Ernest Graves, Sr.	Army	1906, 1912	
Rob Green	Missouri Southern	1997, 2003	Green had no wins in nine games as head coach.
Ray Greene	Alabama A&M	1979–1983, 1986–1988	
Roger A. Greene	Colby	1916, 1923	
James Griffin	Hampton	1941–1942, 1947–1948	
John G. Griffith	Idaho	1902–1906, 1910–1914	
Fred Gushurst	South Dakota Mines	1917, 1919–1920	
Joe Guyon	Union (TN)	1919, 1923–1926	
Roy J. Guyer	Lebanon Valley	1908–1910, 1913–1916	
Eugene M. Haas	Gettysburg	1957–1968, 1973–1974	
Odell Haggins	Florida State	2017, 2019	Haggins served as the Seminoles' interim head coach for the final 2 games of 2017 after Jimbo Fisher left for Texas A&M and for the final 4 games in 2019 after Willie Taggart was fired.
Bert Hall	West Chester	1920, 1922	
Henry Hall	Olivet	1901–1903, 1908–1910, 1912	
Dale E. Hamilton	Central Oklahoma	1941–1949, 1952–1957	Program idle from 1943 to 1945; from 1950 to 1951, Hamilton served in the Korean War.
Tom Hamilton	Navy	1934–1936, 1946–1947	
Tom Hamilton	Pittsburgh	1951, 1954	
Charles Hammett	Allegheny	1913–1917, 1919	
Howard Hancock	Wisconsin–Oshkosh	1921–1928, 1930	
A. G. Harbaugh	Montana State	1901, 1905	
Jack Harding	Miami (FL)	1937–1942, 1945–1947	
Clarion Hardy	Dakota Wesleyan	1902, 1907–1908, 1913–1914	
Lyle W. Hare	Black Hills State	1906, 1911–1919	
Walter Hargesheirner	UMass	1941–1942, 1946	
Homer Woodson Hargiss	Emporia State	1914–1917, 1920–1927	
Dick Harlow	Harvard	1935–1942, 1945–1947	
Harvey Harman	Rutgers	1938–1941, 1946–1955	
Robert E. Harmon	Illinois College	1903, 1917	
William T. Harmon	Illinois College	1910–1916, 1919–1931	
C. E. Harris	Grinnell	1897–1900, 1904	
L. Harris	Alcorn State	1937, 1939–1940	
Sox Harrison	Edinboro	1926–1938, 1941–1942	
Herbert L. Hart	Monmouth (IL)	1925–1929, 1932–1937	
Harry Hartsell	NC State	1917, 1921–1923	
B. T. Harvey	Morehouse	1916–1925, 1927–1928	
Bobby Hauck	Montana	2003–2009, 2018–present	
Charlie Havens	McDaniel	1935–1941, 1946–1956	School was called Western Maryland College
Patrick Haverty	Fitchburg State	2002–2006, 2011–2017	
Jimmy R. Haygood	Henderson State	1907–1918, 1920–1924	
Herman Hayward	Wisconsin-River Falls	1921, 1923	
C. M. Hazen	Richmond	1882–1886, 1888	Team did not play in 1883 and 1884
Charles B. Hedgcock	Northern Michigan	1922–1933, 1936–1937	
Jim Heinitz	Augustana (SD)	1985–1992, 1996–2004	
John Heisman	Oberlin	1892, 1894	
Clay Helton	USC	2013, 2015–2021	Helton was interim coach for the 2013 Las Vegas Bowl and for seven games after Steve Sarkisian's firing in 2015. He was named permanent head coach after the 2015 UCLA game.
Ernie Hertel	Wartburg	1935–1937, 1944–1945	
Fred Hess	Wyoming	1892, 1894, 1898	Hess was co-head coach with Justus Soule in 1894.
Simon Hester	William Penn	1900, 1903	
Bob Higgins	West Virginia Wesleyan	1920, 1922–1924	
Sam H. Hill	Wichita State	1923–1924, 1928–1929	
Nick E. Hinch	Eastern Washington	1908, 1912	
Tony Hinkle	Butler	1926, 1935–1941, 1946–1969	
Lance Hinson	Saint Mary	2005–2013, 2020–present	
Robert T. Hinton	Georgetown (KY)	1908–1917, 1919	
Brady Hoke	San Diego State	2009–2010, 2020–2023	
Bill Hollenback	Penn State	1909, 1911–1914	
Bill Hollenback	Pennsylvania Military	1912, 1915	Now called Widener University
Lamar Hoover	Wichita State	1916–1917, 1921–1922	
George W. Hoskins	Bucknell	1899–1906, 1909	
Blue Howell	Pittsburg State	1929–1935, 1937	
Henry B. Hucles	Virginia Union	1919–1920, 1926–1942	
Harry W. Hughes	Colorado State	1911–1941, 1946	
Claude J. Hunt	Washington	1917, 1919	Washington played in 1918.
Maurice Hunt	Morehouse	1979–1989, 1995–1996	
John Hunthausen	Carroll (MT)	1957, 1959–1961	
R. Victor Hurst	Northern Michigan	1934–1935, 1938–1942	
Vic Hurt	Oklahoma Baptist	1923–1929, 1931–1934	
T. Briscoe Inman	Centre	1952–1956, 1963–1965	
Carl Iverson	Western Colorado	1988–1995, 1997–2000	
Edward Jackson	Delaware State	1933–1936, 1939, 1941–1942, 1945, 1953–1956	
Red Jarrett	North Dakota	1942, 1946–1948	
Allen Jeardeau	Wisconsin-Platteville	1895, 1898	School was then called Platteville Normal
Harry R. Jefferson	Bluefield State	1925–1929, 1932–1933	
Willie Jeffries	South Carolina State	1973–1978, 1989–2001	
Greg Johnson	Langston	1992–1996, 2004–2010	
Walter A. Johnson	Presbyterian	1915–1917, 1919–1940	
Tad Jones	Yale	1916–1917, 1920–1927	
Thomas Kane	Saint Anselm	1909, 1913	
Ted Karras Jr.	Marian (IN)	2007–2012, 2023–present	
Tom Kelley	Framingham State	1982–1984, 2007–present	Team did not play in 2020 due to COVID-19 concerns.
Dan Kenan	Wesleyan	1916, 1920	
A. R. Kennedy	Washburn	1903, 1916–1917	
Walter S. Kennedy	Albion	1904–1905, 1907–1911, 1914–1920	Was co-head coach with Bruce Guyselman from 1918 to 1919.
William C. Kenyon	Maine	1942, 1944–1945	
Bill Kern	West Virginia	1940–1942, 1946–1947	
Dale Kessinger	Highland	1955, 1960–1969	School was known as Doniphan County Junior College from 1960–1965
Glenn Killinger	West Chester	1934–1941, 1945–1959	
Eddie Kimball	BYU	1937–1941, 1946–1948	
Philip King	Wisconsin	1896–1902, 1905	
W. J. King	William & Mary	1897–1898, 1900	
Ray Kirchmeyer	Wagner	1928–1937, 1938–1941, 1946	Team did not play from 1942 until 1945
James Kitts	Virginia Tech	1941, 1946–1947	
Bill Klika	FDU–Florham	1974–1996, 2000–2001	
Greg Knox	Mississippi State	2017, 2023	Knox was named interim head coach of the Bulldogs for their appearance in the 2017 TaxSlayer Bowl after Dan Mullen left for Florida and for the final 2 games in 2023 after Zach Arnett was fired.
Robert Kolf	Oshkosh State	1929, 1931–1942, 1946–1962	School now known as Wisconsin–Oshkosh
Hal Kopp	Rhode Island	1950, 1952–1955	
Stan Kostka	North Dakota State	1941, 1946–1947	
Harl Lahar	Colgate	1952–1956, 1962–1967	
Oliver M. Lanhorst	Elmhurst	1933–1948, 1960–1962	
Charles Lantz	Eastern Illinois	1911–1934, 1944	No season in 1918.
Frank Leahy	Notre Dame	1941–1943, 1946–1953	
Edwin W. Lee	Washington (St. Louis)	1898, 1900	
Jay L. Lee	William Penn	1915, 1917–1920	Team did not play in 1918
John P. Lee	Fordham	1891, 1893	
Kelley Lee	Eastern New Mexico	2017–2020, 2023–present	Team did not play in 2020 due to COVID-19 restrictions.
Sam Lee	Keystone	1936, 1942–1943	
Wally Lemm	Lake Forest	1952–1953, 1957	
Al Leonzi	Kutztown	1984, 1993–1997	
Henry W. Lever	Linfield	1930–1938, 1940–1942	
Emil Liston	Baker	1920–1937, 1940–1942	
George Little	Miami (OH)	1916, 1919–1921	
Dominic Livedoti	Olivet	1988–1992, 2005–2009	
Mike Locksley	Maryland	2015, 2019–2026	Was interim head coach of the team for their final 5 games in 2015 after Randy Edsall's firing.
John B. Longwell	Samford	1909, 1911, 1916–1917	
Will Lotter	UC Davis	1954, 1956–1957, 1959–1963	
Lynn Lundin	Bethel (MN)	1950, 1953–1959	
Richard W. Luther	Western Reserve	1947, 1950	
Bill Lynch	DePauw	2004, 2013–2019	
George Lynch	St. Cloud State	1920–1928, 1933–1934	
James Lytle	Shaw	1928–1929, 1934–1945	Team did not play from 1943 to 1944
Frank Maile	Utah State	2018, 2020	Maile served as the Aggies interim head coach for their appearance in the 2018 New Mexico Bowl after Matt Wells left for Texas Tech, and for the final 5 games of the 2020 season after the school parted ways with Gary Andersen.
Rip Major	Wofford	1919, 1922–1926	
Johnny Majors	Pittsburgh	1973–1976, 1993–1996	Won a national title at Pittsburgh in his first tenure.
Oliver Mann	Rutgers	1903, 1905	
Wally Marks	Indiana State	1927–1930, 1933–1941, 1946–1948	
Duncan M. Martin	Hillsdale	1896, 1898	
Art Martynuska	Saint Francis	1969–1979, 1981	
Robert Mastny	St. Procopius	1927–1928, 1930, 1934–1936	School now known as Benedictine (IL)
Charles Mayser	Franklin & Marshall	1919–1914; 1924–1925; 1944–1945	
Peter Mazzaferro	Bridgewater State	1968–1986, 1988–2004	
William McAndrew	Southern Illinois	1913–1916, 1921–1938	
Bill McArthur	Western Oregon	1947–1954, 1956–1982	Was known as Oregon College until 1981.
William McAvoy	Delaware	1908–1916, 1922–1924	
Sam P. McBirney	Tulsa	1908, 1914–1916	
Dan McCann	Duquesne	1970–1983, 1988–1992	
Tim McCarty	East Central	2004–2005, 2009–2017	
Jack McClairen	Bethune–Cookman	1961–1972, 1994–1997	
Sam McCorkle	West Alabama (Note: Known as Livingston State during McCorkle's first tenure, and West Alabama since 1995.)	1985–1990, 2004–2005	
James H. McCurdy	Springfield	1895–1903, 1907–1916	
Raymond McDougal	Fayetteville State	1970–1979, 1989–1991	
Stan McGarvey	William Jewell	1978–1980, 1987–1988	
Dan McGugin	Vanderbilt	1904–1917, 1919–1934	
Jack McKay	Butler	1907–1908, 1910	
Tuss McLaughry	Dartmouth	1941–1942, 1945–1954	
Tuss McLaughry	Westminster (PA)	1915–1916, 1918, 1921	Co-head coach with Andrew Park in 1915
R.D. McLeod	Colorado College	1885, 1895	
Maury McMains	Drexel	1944–1945, 1948	After coaching two full seasons at Drexel, McMains left the head coaching position after the 1945 season to become athletic director. During the 1948 football season, after an 0–5 start, McMains relieved head football coach Ralph Chase of his duties and became head coach for the last three games of the season.
R.D. McLeod	Colorado College	1885, 1895	
Daryl C. McNeill	Johnson C. Smith	1995–1996, 2005–2009	
Herb McQuillan	Stetson	1924–1934, 1955–1956	Went 21 years between coaching periods.
Randolph M. Medley	Southwestern	1939–1947, 1950	
T. Nelson Metcalf	Oberlin	1913, 1919–1921	
Ray Michaels	Muskingum	1917, 1919	
Dennis Michie	Army	1890, 1892	
John O. Miller	New Mexico State	1899, 1901–1907	
Alfred Miles	Middle Tennessee	1913–1916, 1919–1923	
T. R. Mobley	Louisiana	1916, 1919, 1921–1930	
George Moody	Elizabeth City State	1993–1995, 1998–1999	
Jim Moore	Murray State	1941, 1946–1947	
Charles Morgan	Pittsburg State	1936, 1938–1948	
Edward Morrison	Howard	1920–1924, 1928	
Ray Morrison	SMU	1915–1916, 1924–1934	Was co-head coach with Ewing Y. Freeland from 1922–1923.
Ray Morrison	Vanderbilt	1918, 1935–1939	
David C. Morrow	Washington & Jefferson	1908–1911, 1919–1920, 1924–1925	
Mertz Mortorelli	Wisconsin-Superior	1954–1969, 1975–1983	
Arthur Mosse	Central Missouri	1899, 1902	
B. Moyer	Willamette	1903, 1907	
Moon Mullins	Saint Ambrose	1940, 1947–1950	
Frank Murray	Marquette	1922–1936, 1946–1949	
W. E. Murray	Benedict	1926, 1932	
Denny Myers	Boston College	1941–1942, 1946–1950	
Howdy Myers	Johns Hopkins	1946–1949, 1979	Myers had a 30-year break in tenure at Johns Hopkins
Robert L. Myers	Centre	1917, 1924–1925	
Edward Mylin	Lafayette	1937–1942, 1946	
Sliv Nemzek	Minnesota State–Moorhead	1919, 1923–1940	
Samuel B. Newton	Williams	1907, 1909–1910	
Samuel B. Newton	Lafayette	1898–1901, 1911	
Robert Neyland	Tennessee	1926–1934, 1936–1940, 1946–1952	Interrupted his coaching twice to serve in the U.S. Army
Angus Nicoson	Indianapolis	1947–1949, 1954	
Ralph Nichols	Washington	1895–1896, 1898	
Billy Nicks	Morris Brown	1930–1935, 1937–1939, 1941–1942	
Billy Nicks	Prairie View A&M	1945–1947, 1952–1965	
Bob Nielson	Minnesota–Duluth	1999–2003, 2008–2012	Won two Division II national titles in his second tenure.
Harvey O'Brien	The Citadel	1916–1918, 1920–1921	
Maynard O'Brien	Eastern Illinois	1946–1950, 1952–1955	
Howie O'Daniels	Cal Poly	1933–1941, 1946–1947	
Frank "Buck" O'Neill	Colgate	1902, 1904–1905	
Frank "Buck" O'Neill	Syracuse	1906–1907, 1913–1915, 1917–1919	
Tex Oliver	Oregon	1938–1941, 1945–1946	
Cliff Olson	Pacific Lutheran	1929–1941, 1946	
Leonard A. Olson	Augustana (SD)	1931–1942, 1946	
Preston Vaughn Overall	Tennessee Tech	1923–1946, 1952–1953	
Foster F. Parker	William Penn	1898–1899, 1901	
Herb Parker	Minot State	1947–1949, 1951	
Wallace Parker	Central Michigan	1921–1923, 1926–1928	
Willie Parker	Alabama State	1973–1975, 1984, 1986	
Art Parkhurst	Northwestern Oklahoma State	1956–1964, 1972–1973	
Tom Parry	Central Washington	1966–1982, 1984–1986	
Dale Patterson	Northeastern Oklahoma A&M	1996–2003, 2011–2012	
Simon F. Pauxtis	Pennsylvania Military	1916–1929, 1939–1946	Now called Widener University
Mike Pecarovich	Loyola Marymount	1928, 1939	
Bo Pelini	Nebraska	2003, 2008–2014	Pelini coached the final game (the Alamo Bowl) of the 2003 season after Frank Solich was fired.
James Owen Perrine	Northern Iowa	1910, 1917	
Marty Peters	Benedictine (KS)	1937–1941, 1946–1947	
Bobby Petrino	Louisville	2003–2006, 2014–2018	
Bobby Petrino	Arkansas	2008–2011, 2025	Petrino served as the interim head coach for the final 7 games of 2025 following Sam Pittman's dismissal.
Bill Pierce	Austin	1935, 1947–1948	
Alvin Pierson	Fresno State	1945, 1949	
Boozer Pitts	Auburn	1923–1924, 1927	
Doug Porter	Fort Valley State	1979–1985, 1987–1996	
Tom Porter	St. Olaf	1958–1967, 1969–1990	
Frank Potts	Colorado	1940, 1944–1945	
Irving Pray	Louisiana State	1916, 1919, 1922	
Gabby Price	Husson	2003–2008, 2013–2018	
Mike Price	UTEP	2004–2012, 2017	Price returned as interim head coach after the resignation of Sean Kugler during the 2017 season.
Percy S. Prince	Louisiana Tech	1909–1915, 1919	
John Pucillo	Millersville	1925–1929, 1933–1936	
Charles M. Rademacher	Saint Louis	1917, 1919–1920	
W. C. Raftery	Washington and Lee	1917, 1919–1921	
George Ralston	Wilkes	1946–1954, 1957	
Casto Ramsey	Emory and Henry	1953–1956, 1960–1968	
Alured Ransom	Geneva	1941, 1946–1948	
Eddie Reed	Loyola (LA)	1926, 1935–1936	
Red Reese	Eastern Washington	1930–1941, 1946	
Bill Reid	Harvard	1901, 1905–1906	
Benjamin F. Reiter	Marietta	1909–1911, 1917–1918	
Charlie Richard	Baker	1980–1990, 1992–1994	
John Richards	Wisconsin	1911, 1917, 1919–1922	
Pat Riepma	Northwood	1993–2007, 2014	
Ed Rifilato	Fort Lewis	2004–2009, 2016–2018	
Walter Riggs	Clemson	1896, 1899	
Mike Riley	Oregon State	1997–1998, 2003–2014	Returned to Oregon State after coaching in the NFL
Manuel Rivero	Lincoln (PA)	1934–1947, 1951	Team did not play in 1943
Eddie "Robbie" Robinson	Brown	1898–1901, 1904–1907, 1910–1925	
John Robinson	USC	1976–1982, 1993–1997	Won a national title in his first tenure
Merton Robinson	Howard	1908, 1918–1919	
Stanley L. Robinson	Mississippi College	1920–1923, 1928–1953	Team did not play from 1942 to 1945
Harry Rockafeller	Rutgers	1927–1930, 1942–1945	
Ira Rodgers	West Virginia	1925–1930, 1943–1945	
Rich Rodriguez	West Virginia	2001–2007, 2025–present	
George Rogers	The Citadel	1913–1915, 1919	
Bill Roper	Princeton	1906–1908, 1910–1911, 1919–1930	Three undefeated seasons and four national championships at Princeton
Dana Rucker	Richmond	1891, 1893–1895	
Frederick Bushnell "Jack" Ryder	Ohio State	1892–1895, 1898	
Elton Rynearson	Eastern Michigan (Note: Then formally known as Michigan State Normal College; short form Michigan Normal.)	1917, 1919–1920, 1925–1948	No season in 1944. Rynearson is considered the most successful coach in the program, leading the team to several undefeated seasons. Eastern Michigan's current stadium bears his name.
Henry Russell Sanders	Vanderbilt	1940–1942, 1946–1948	
Don Salls	Jacksonville State	1946–1952, 1954–1964	
Paul Samson	Emporia State	1904–1906, 1908	Then called Kansas State Normal
Joe Savage	Saint Francis	1911–1912, 1917–1919	Team did not play in 1918
Herb Schmalenberger	UC Davis	1958, 1964–1969	
Harvey Schofield	Wisconsin-Stevens Point	1900, 1903	
Ed Schwager	Wisconsin-Whitewater	1942, 1946–1955	
John D. Schwender	Carroll (WI)	1899–1900, 1904–1905	
Clark Shaughnessy	Maryland	1942, 1946	
Clark Shaughnessy	Tulane	1915–1920, 1922–1926	
Greg Schiano	Rutgers	2001–2011, 2020–present	
Jack Schouten	Hope	1917, 1920–1930	
Robert M. Shores	Lenoir-Rhyne	1932–1936, 1938–1941	
Clarence A. Short	Delaware	1902, 1906	
Brad Smith	Chadron State	1987–2004, 2011	Was interim head coach for the final 4 games of the 2011 season.
Clyde B. Smith	Wisconsin–La Crosse	1938–1942, 1946–1947	
Fred L. Smith	Fordham	1901, 1904, 1906–1907	Smith was co-head coach with Maurice McCarthy in 1901.
Hampton Smith	Albany State	1971–1976, 1982–1999	
Herbert L. Smith	Wayne State	1948, 1955–1959	
Sid Smith	McPherson	1953–1966, 1971–1972	
Warren W. Smith	Oregon	1901, 1903	
W. Smith	Union (NY)	1900–1901, 1903–1904	
Carl Snavely	North Carolina	1934–1935, 1945–1952	
Norm Snead	Apprentice	1977–1984, 1988–1989	
Bill Snyder	Kansas State	1989–2005, 2009–2018	
Harry Snyder	Slippery Rock	1908–1909, 1911–1913	
Tommy Spangler	Presbyterian	2001–2006, 2017–2020	
Frank Spaziani	Boston College	2006, 2009–2012	Spaziani coached the final game of the 2006 season (the Meineke Car Care Bowl) after Tom O'Brien left.
Thomas Stephens	Curry	1972–1979, 1981–1982	
J. W. Stephenson	Jacksonville State	1920–1921, 1929–1930	
Peter P. Stevens	Ursinus	1941–1943, 1946	
Roy Stewart	Murray State	1932–1940, 1942–1945	No season in 1943. Murray State's current stadium bears his name.
Bob Stoops	Oklahoma	1999–2016, 2021	Stoops retired in 2016, but returned as interim head coach for Oklahoma's bowl game after Lincoln Riley left for USC.
Tony Storti	Montana State	1952–1953, 1956–1957	
Eugene Stringer	Saint Francis	1926, 1930–1931	
Arthur L. Strum	Indiana State	1923–1926, 1932, 1942	
Dwight Stuessy	Macalester	1937–1938, 1946–1956	
Fred Sullivan	Ohio	1899, 1903	
Jack Surridge	Concordia–St. Paul	1973–1977, 1983	
Jim Sweeney	Fresno State	1976–1977, 1980–1996	
Tony V. Swinton	Allen	1932–1933, 1938–1939	
Clark Swisher	Northern State	1946–1955, 1957–1968	
Bud Talbott	Dayton	1920, 1921	Talbott was interim head coach for Dayton's final game of the 1921 season.
Charles Tambling	Central Michigan	1902–1905, 1918	
Jim Tatum	North Carolina	1942, 1956–1958	
Nat Taylor	Morgan State	1974–1975, 1982	
Mike Taylor	North Greenville	1987–1991, 2004–2008	
Jeff Tedford	Fresno State	2017–2019, 2022–2023	
Buddy Teevens	Dartmouth	1987–1991, 2005–2022	
Gordon A. Teller	Hobart	1897–1899, 1901	
Ralph Thacker	Macalester	1917–1918, 1922–1924	
Jesse Thomas	Western Kentucky	1933, 1946–1947	
Bobby Thompson	Fort Hays State	1979–1980, 1984	
John Thompson	Arkansas State	2012, 2013	Thompson was an interim head coach for two Arkansas State appearances in the game now known as the LendingTree Bowl. He was first named interim coach after the 2012 regular season when Gus Malzahn left to take the head coaching vacancy at Auburn, and coached in the 2013 game. Thompson again became interim coach after the 2013 regular season when Bryan Harsin left for Boise State, and coached in the 2014 game.
Thomas Trenchard	North Carolina	1895, 1913–1915	
Thomas Trenchard	Washington & Lee	1899, 1901	
Richard Tysseling	Central (IA)	1938–1944, 1946–1960	
Otto D. Unruh	Bethel (KS)	1919–1942, 1967–1969	25 years and nine other head coaches held the post between times of service, including his son David Unruh
Fred Vail	Gettysburg	1904–1906, 1909–1911	
LaRue Van Meter	Illinois College	1932–1933, 1937	
Alphonso Varner	Fort Valley State	1960, 1962	
Johnny Vaught	Ole Miss	1947–1970, 1973	
Matt Viator	McNeese	2006–2015, 2025–present	
Dave Waddell	Linfield	1901, 1905	
Charley Wade	Western New Mexico	1994–1995, 2001–2006	
Wallace Wade	Duke	1931–1941, 1946–1950	
James J. Walker	Central State	1957–1964, 1967–1973	
Bobby Wallace	North Alabama	1988–1997, 2012–2016	
Bill Walsh	Stanford	1977–1978, 1992–1994	
Charles W. Wantland	Central Oklahoma	1912–1919, 1921–1930	
W. Rice Warren	Virginia	1913, 1920–1921	
Glenn Scobey "Pop" Warner	Cornell	1897–1898, 1904–1906	
Glenn Scobey "Pop" Warner	Carlisle	1899–1903, 1907–1914	
Louis L. Watson	Howard	1923, 1925–1927	
Vincent S. Welch	Hobart	1916, 1918–1929	
Edward A. Werner	Trinity	1909–1910, 1914	
Bill Wertenbaker	Washington and Lee	1900, 1902	
Charles A. West	North Dakota	1928–1941, 1945	
Charles Fremont West	Howard	1928, 1934–1935	
Charles Whelan	Tufts	1903–1907, 1912–1917, 1919	
Mark Whipple	UMass	1998–2003, 2014–2018	Whipple won a Division I-AA (FCS) national title in the first year of his first tenure.
William C. White	Samford	1940–1941, 1954	
Mickey Whitehurst	Western Maryland	1901–1906, 1912	Now McDaniel College
Todd Whitten	Tarleton State	1996, 2000–2004, 2016–present	
Harry J. Wienbergen	Dickinson State	1928–1943, 1946–1949, 1951–1952	Team did not play in 1942
Henry L. Wilder	Lebanon Valley	1906–1907, 1911–1912, 1921–1922	
Bob Williams	Clemson	1906, 1909, 1913–1915	
Charles Holston Williams	Hampton	1914–1917, 1919–1920	
Doug Williams	Grambling State	1998–2003, 2011–2013	
Rick Willis	Wartburg	1997–2005, 2008–2021	
Fred Wilson	Lewis & Clark	1965–1983, 1987	
Jimmy Wilson	Buffalo	1932–1933, 1950–1951	
Squibb Wilson	Fairmont State	1940–1942, 1946–1951	
Edgar Wingard	Susquehanna	1916–1917, 1919, 1924–1925	
William J. Wisdom	Tarleton State	1920–1922, 1924–1928, 1930–1935	
Frank N. Wolf	Waynesburg	1921–1922, 1928–1941	
Sol Wolf	Lock Haven	1923, 1934	
Star Wood	ETSU	1952–1953, 1955–1965	
Warren B. Woodson	Hardin-Simmons	1941–1942, 1946–1951	
Hoover J. Wright	Prairie View A&M	1966–1968, 1973–1979	
Alvin Wyatt	Bethune–Cookman	1997–2009, 2026	Served as interim head coach for one game in 2026 following Raymond Woodie Jr.'s firing
Frank Wyatt	Northwestern Oklahoma State	1906–1915, 1919–1923	
James J. Yeager	Colorado	1941–1943, 1946–1947	
Louis Yeager	West Virginia	1899, 1901–1902	
Fielding H. Yost	Michigan	1901–1923, 1925–1926	
Donzell Young	Arkansas–Pine Bluff	1973–1975, 1984–1986	
Don Young	Black Hills State	1948–1950, 1953–1958, 1967	
Ralph H. Young	Kalamazoo	1916–1917, 1919–1922	
Walter Yund	Carroll (MT)	1914–1915, 1919	
Herman F. Zimoski	Delta State	1928–1932, 1934–1945	
Bill Zorn	Wisconsin-Eau Claire	1928–1940, 1942	
