= List of Arkansas–Pine Bluff Golden Lions head football coaches =

The Arkansas–Pine Bluff Golden Lions football program is a college football team that represents University of Arkansas at Pine Bluff in the Southwestern Athletic Conference, a part of the NCAA Division I Football Championship Subdivision. The team has had 18 head coaches on record since its first recorded football game in 1923 (Donzell Young held the position twice). In December 2022, Alonzo Hampton was hired as head coach of the Golden Lions.

== Key ==
Key to symbols in coaches list
General		Overall		Conference		Postseason (Note: Although the first Rose Bowl Game was played in 1902, it has been continuously played since the 1916 game, and is recognized as the oldest bowl game by the NCAA. "—" indicates any season prior to 1916 when postseason games were not played.)	
No.	Order of coaches (Note: A running total of the number of head coaches, with coaches who served separate tenures being counted only once. Interim head coaches are represented with "Int" and are not counted in the running total. "—" indicates the team played but either without a coach or no coach is on record. "X" indicates an interim year without play.)	GC	Games coached	CW	Conference wins	PW	Postseason wins
DC	Division championships	OW	Overall wins	CL	Conference losses	PL	Postseason losses
CC	Conference championships	OL	Overall losses	CT	Conference ties	PT	Postseason ties
NC	National championships	OT	Overall ties (Note: Overtime rules in college football were introduced in 1996, making ties impossible in the period since.)	C%	Conference winning percentage		
†	Elected to the College Football Hall of Fame	O%	Overall winning percentage (Note: When computing the win–loss percentage, a tie counts as half a win and half a loss.)				

== Coaches ==
Statistics updated through end of 2025 season.

No.	Name	Term	GC	OW	OL	OT	O%	CW	CL	CT	C%	PW	PL	CCs	NCs	Awards
1	Unknown	1923–1925	4	0	4	0	.000	—	—	—		—	—	—	—	
	No team	1926–1927	0	0	0	0	–	0	0	0		0	0	0	0	
2	Caesar Felton Gayles	1928–1929	20	8	9	3	.475	—	—	—		—	—	—	—	
3	James Lytle	1930–1931	15	11	4	0	.733	—	—	—		—	—	—	—	
4	James W. Hazzard	1932–1934, 1936	38	19	14	5	.566	2	3	1	.417	—	—	—	—	
5	James McCrary	1935	10	4	6	0	.400	—	—	—	.417	—	—	—	—	
6	William S. Taylor	1937–1941	49	21	22	6	.490	8	16	6	.367	—	—	—	—	
	No team	1942–1943	0	0	0	0	–	—	—	—		—	—	—	—	
7	Chester Hynes	1944–1945	16	3	13	0	.188	1	11	0	.083	—	—	—	—	
8	Lamar Allen	1946–1949	43	17	19	5	.476	6	17	4	.296	—	—	—	—	
9	Roland K. Bernard	1950–1952	30	11	15	4	.433	11	15	4	.475	—	—	—	—	
10	Leroy Moore	1953–1956	40	9	26	5	.288	5	18	2	.240	—	—	—	—	
11	Charles Spearman	1957–1961	49	19	29	1	.398	8	23	1	.266	—	—	—	—	
12	Vannette W. Johnson	1962–1972	105	53	46	6	.533	22	29	5	.438	—	—	—	—	
13	Donzell Young	1973–1975, 1984–1986	57	10	45	2	.193	0	14	0	.000	—	—	—	—	
14	James Shaw	1976–1979	40	15	24	1	.388	—	—	—		—	—	—	—	
15	Ben McGee	1980–1983	43	17	22	4	.442	—	—	—		—	—	—	—	
16	Archie Cooley	1987–1990	42	27	13	2	.667	—	—	—		—	—	—	—	
17	Lee Hardman	1993–2003	121	64	57	0	.529	23	25	0	.479	—	—	—	—	
18	Mo Forte	2004–2007	39	17	22	0	.436	15	15	0	.500	—	—	—	—	
19	Monte Coleman	2008–2017	111	40	71	0	.360	27	57	0	.321	—	—	1	—	
20	Cedric Thomas	2018–2019	22	8	14	0	.364	4	10	0	.286	—	—	—	—	
21	Doc Gamble	2020–2022	23	8	15	0	.348	5	11	0	.313	—	—	—	—	
Int.	Don Treadwell	2022	4	1	3	0	.250	1	3	0	.250	—	—	—	—	
22	Alonzo Hampton	2023–present	35	9	26	0	.257	5	19	0	.208	—	—	—	—	
