= List of Saint Francis Red Wolves head football coaches =

The Saint Francis Red Wolves football program is a college football team that represents Saint Francis University in the Presidents' Athletic Conference, a part of the NCAA Division III.

The current coach is Chris Villarrial who first took the position for the 2010 season.

== Key ==
Years	Duration of head coaching career at Saint Francis
Won	Number of games won at Saint Francis
Lost	Number of games lost at Saint Francis
Tied	Number of games tied at Saint Francis
%	Percentage of games won at Saint Francis

== Head coaches ==
The following are the head football coaches of the team since founding in 1892.

Head Coach	Years	Won	Lost	Tied	%
Unknown †	1892–1908				
Clarence Miller	1909	2	2	0	.500
Coach Carroll	1910	3	2	1	.583
Joe Savage, T.O.R.	1911–1912	14	6	2	.682
Unknown ‡	1913				
Buck Rodgers	1914	4	2	0	.667
Oliver Vogel	1915	2	3	0	.400
No team	1916				
Joe Savage, T.O.R.	1917	6	0	0	1.000
No team	1918				
Joe Savage, T.O.R.	1919	3	4	0	1.000
No team	1920–1921				
John Loughran	1922–1923	0	10	0	.000
James Mahan	1924	2	3	0	.400
Emmet J. Russell	1925	5	1	1	.786
Eugene T. Stringer	1926	4	1	0	.800
Fulton Connors	1927	6	2	0	.750
William Donahue	1928–1929	8	5	2	.600
Eugene T. Stringer	1930–1931	6	9	1	.406
No teams	1932–1937				
Jim Leonard	1938–1941	13	15	2	.467
No teams	1942–1946				
Jim Leonard	1947	4	1	0	.800
Larry Kirshling	1948	5	4	0	.556
Irwin Davis	1949–1953	14	27	1	.345
No teams	1954–1968				
Art Martynuska	1969–1979	42	45	2	.483
Jerry Roberts (Acting)	1980	2	7	0	.222
Art Martynuska	1981	3	6	1	.350
George Klayko	1982–1983	1	15	1	.088
Hugh Conrad Jr.	1984–1985	1	16	0	.059
Gerry Gallagher	1986–1988	9	18	0	.333
Frank Pergolizzi	1989–1994	25	33	0	.431
Pete Mayock	1995–1997	5	26	0	.161
Kevin Doherty	1998	0	10	0	.000
Dave Jaumotte	1999–2001	2	30	0	.063
Dave Opfar	2002–2009	17	68	0	.200
Chris Villarrial	2010–present	68	98	0	.410

- † Teams fielded, but records destroyed in fire
- ‡ Records missing
