= 1946 Western Maryland Green Terror football team =

American college football season

1946 Western Maryland Green Terror football
- Conference: Mason–Dixon Conference
- Record: 5–2 (4–1 Mason–Dixon)
- Head coach: Charlie Havens (8th season)
- Captains: Art O'Keeffe; "Sig" Jensen
- Home stadium: Hoffa Field

1946 Mason–Dixon Conference football standings
	Conf.					Overall
Team	W		L		T	W		L		T
No. 19 Delaware $	3	–	0	–	0	10	–	0	–	0
Johns Hopkins	2	–	0	–	0	5	–	3	–	0
Western Maryland	4	–	1	–	0	5	–	2	–	0
Hampden–Sydney	2	–	2	–	0	2	–	2	–	0
Randolph–Macon	2	–	4	–	0	2	–	4	–	0
Washington College	1	–	5	–	0	1	–	5	–	0
Mount St. Mary's	0	–	2	–	0	0	–	2	–	0
$ – Conference champion; Rankings from AP Poll

The 1946 Western Maryland Green Terror football team was an American football team that represented Western Maryland College (now known as McDaniel College) as a member of the Mason–Dixon Conference during the 1946 college football season. In its eighth season under head coach Charlie Havens, the team compiled an undefeated 5–2 record (4–1 against conference opponents) and outscored opponent by a total of 168 to 94. Art O'Keeffe and "Sig" Jensen were the team's captains. Western Maryland played home games at Hoffa Field on Westminster, Maryland.

== Schedule ==
Date	Opponent	Site	Result	Attendance	Source
October 5	at Gettysburg*	Gettysburg, PA	W 18–6		
October 11	at Delaware	Wilmington Park; Wilmington, DE	L 6–44	7,500	
October 19	Mount St. Mary's	Hoffa Field; Westminster, MD	W 46–7		
October 26	at Washington (MD)	Chestertown, MD	W 13–6		
November 2	Hampden–Sydney^{†}	Hoffa Field; Westminster, MD	W 38–6		
November 9	at Randolph–Macon	Ashland, VA	W 27–0	1,100	
November 16	at Dickinson*	Biddle Field; Carlisle, PA	L 20–25		
*Non-conference game; ^{†}Homecoming
