= 1946 Johns Hopkins Blue Jays football team =

American college football season

1946 Johns Hopkins Blue Jays football
- Conference: Mason–Dixon Conference
- Record: 5–3 (2–0 Mason–Dixon)
- Head coach: Howdy Myers (1st season)

1946 Mason–Dixon Conference football standings
| | Conf. | | | | | Overall |
| Team | W | | L | | T | W | | L | | T |
|---|---|---|---|---|---|---|---|---|---|---|
| No. 19 Delaware $ | 3 | – | 0 | – | 0 | 10 | – | 0 | – | 0 |
| Johns Hopkins | 2 | – | 0 | – | 0 | 5 | – | 3 | – | 0 |
| Western Maryland | 4 | – | 1 | – | 0 | 5 | – | 2 | – | 0 |
| Hampden–Sydney | 2 | – | 2 | – | 0 | 2 | – | 2 | – | 0 |
| Randolph–Macon | 2 | – | 4 | – | 0 | 2 | – | 4 | – | 0 |
| Washington College | 1 | – | 5 | – | 0 | 1 | – | 5 | – | 0 |
| Mount St. Mary's | 0 | – | 2 | – | 0 | 0 | – | 2 | – | 0 |
$ – Conference champion; Rankings from AP Poll

The 1946 Johns Hopkins Blue Jays football team was an American football team that represented Johns Hopkins University as a member of the Mason–Dixon Conference during the 1946 college football season. In its first season under head coach Howdy Myers, Johns Hopkins compiled a 5–3 record (2–0 against conference opponents) and was outscored 117 to 90, largely due to a 53–0 loss in the first game of the season against Middle Three champion Rutgers.

== Schedule ==
| Date | Opponent | Site | Result | Attendance | Source |
|---|---|---|---|---|---|
| October 5 | at Rutgers* | Rutgers Stadium; Piscataway, NJ | L 0–53 | 7,000 | |
| October 12 | at Washington College | Chestertown, MD | W 13–7 | | |
| October 19 | Pennsylvania Military* | Baltimore, MD | W 27–0 | | |
| October 26 | Randolph–Macon | Baltimore, MD | W 24–8 | | |
| November 2 | at Drexel* | Drexel Field; Philadelphia, PA | W 7–0 | 2,000 | |
| November 9 | Swarthmore* | Baltimore, MD | L 0–6 | | |
| November 16 | at Haverford* | Haverford, PA | W 19–7 | | |
| November 23 | at Buffalo* | Civic Stadium; Buffalo, NY | L 0–36 | | |
*Non-conference game
