= Edward Werner (disambiguation) =

Edward Werner (1878–1945) was a Polish economist and politician.

Edward Werner may also refer to:

- Edward C. Werner (1850–1939), American politician
- E. T. C. Werner (Edward Theodore Chalmers Werner, 1864–1954), British sinologist and diplomat
- Edward A. Werner (1882–?), American college football player and coach
