= Maurice McCarthy =

Maurice McCarthy may refer to:

- Maurice McCarthy (American football), American football player and coach
- Maurice McCarthy (Gaelic footballer) (1881–1962), Irish sportsperson
