= Mount St. Mary's Mountaineers softball =

College softball team

Mount St. Mary's Mountaineers
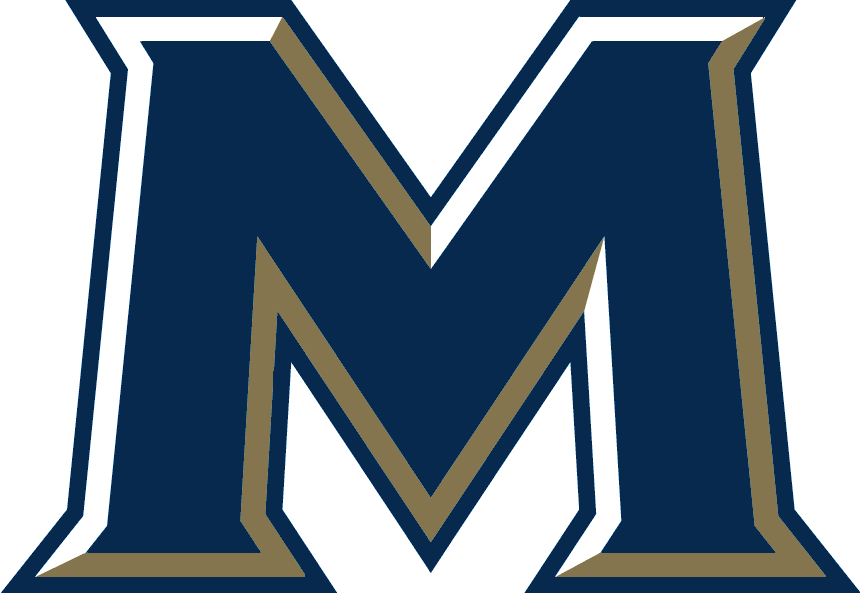
- University: Mount St. Mary's University
- Head coach: Anna Nagro (16th season)
- Conference: MAAC
- Location: Emmitsburg, Maryland, US
- Home stadium: Our Lady of the Meadows Field
- Nickname: Mountaineers
- Colors: Blue and white

For information on all Mount St. Mary's University sports, see Mount St. Mary's Mountaineers

The Mount St. Mary's Mountaineers softball team represents Mount St. Mary's University in NCAA Division I college softball. The team participates in the Metro Atlantic Athletic Conference (MAAC). From 1994 until 2022, the team was a member of the Northeast Conference (NEC). Prior to joining the NEC, they were independent from 1981 until 1993. The Mountaineers are currently led by head coach Anna Nagro. The team plays its home games at Our Lady of the Meadows Field, which is located on the college's campus.

== History ==
Since joining the Northeast Conference in 1994, the Mountaineers have failed to win either a conference regular season championship or a conference tournament championship. In doing so, they have also failed to qualify for the NCAA Division I softball tournament.

On April 27, 2022, it was announced that the Mountaineers would be leaving the Northeast Conference to join the Metro Atlantic Athletic Conference in all sports starting in the 2022–23 academic year. Mount St. Mary's effectively replaced the Monmouth Hawks, who departed the MAAC for the Colonial Athletic Association starting in the same year.

=== Coaching history ===
Years	Coach	Record	%
1981	Andrea Wickerham	2–10	.167
1982–1989	Denise Ditch	90–64	.584
1990–1995	Regina Gebhart	29–163–1	.153
1996	Jennifer Booth	0–15–1	.031
1996–2003	Tricia Fiut	68–190	.264
2003–2004	Shana Gray	26–49–1	.349
2005–2010	Larry Alvis	118–174	.404
2011–present	Anna Nagro	279–455–2	.380

== Roster ==
2024 Mount St. Mary's Mountaineers roster
Pitchers: 2 – Amaya Bowman – Senior; 44 – Maddie Coleman – Sophomore; 6 – Kaya Hannon – Freshman; 55 – Olivia Murphy – Junior; 4 – Sophia Schmehl – Freshman; Catchers: 34 – Tori Bowles – Senior; 17 – Tristin Koerner – Sophomore; 11 – Brianna Manni – Junior	Infielders: 1 – Avery Dinges – Freshman; 15 – Daisy Gardner – Senior; 26 – Hannah Gartrell – Senior; 14 – Jessica Purgason – Freshman; Outfielders: 24 – Payten De Weese – Sophomore; 7 – Gina Del Giorno – Sophomore; 10 – Laurenne Gallagher – Junior; 50 – Zoe Truxon – Senior; 12 – Julia Vincent – Senior; 8 – Taylor Williams – Freshman; Utility: 99 – Dani Brown – Junior; 16 – Lia Festa – Sophomore; 9 – Elizabeth King – Graduate Student; 00 – Abigayle Perry – Senior

== Season-by-season results ==
Record table
Season	Coach	Overall	Conference	Standing	Postseason
Mount St. Mary's Mountaineers (Mason–Dixon Conference) (1981–1988)
1981	Andrea Wickerham	2–10			
1982	Denise Ditch	5–6			
1983	Denise Ditch	8–7			
1984	Denise Ditch	6–7			
1985	Denise Ditch	12–5			
1986	Denise Ditch	10–15			
1987	Denise Ditch	22–3			
1988	Denise Ditch	18–9			
Mount St. Mary's Mountaineers (Northeast Conference) (1989–2022)
1989	Denise Ditch	9–12			
1990	Regina Gebhart	7–15			
1991	Regina Gebhart	1–29			
1992	Regina Gebhart	4–28			
1993	Regina Gebhart	5–22			
1994	Regina Gebhart	5–30	0–6	N/A	
1995	Regina Gebhart	7–39–1	0–15	N/A	
1996	Jennifer Booth/Tricia Fiut	6–27–1	2–14	N/A	
1997	Tricia Fiut	8–32	1–15	N/A	
1998	Tricia Fiut	7–33	2–10	6th	
1999	Tricia Fiut	19–20	11–7	5th	
2000	Tricia Fiut	15–25	8–12	8th	
2001	Tricia Fiut	4–32	3–19	11th	
2002	Tricia Fiut	8–31	3–19	12th	
2003	Tricia Fiut/Shana Gary	14–24–1	7–13	8th	
2004	Shana Gary	13–30	6–12	T–9th	
2005	Larry Alvis	12–29	8–12	8th	
2006	Larry Alvis	31–25	14–6	4th	
2007	Larry Alvis	11–29	3–13	8th	
2008	Larry Alvis	21–36	3–13	9th	
2009	Larry Alvis	18–30	10–8	5th	
2010	Larry Alvis	25–25	7–12	7th	
2011	Anna Nagro	15–31	5–15	10th	
2012	Anna Nagro	17–34	8–12	8th	
2013	Anna Nagro	16–30	7–13	8th	
2014	Anna Nagro	19–24–1	7–9	T–6th	
2015	Anna Nagro	11–33	4–12	8th	
2016	Anna Nagro	15–35	6–10	6th	
2017	Anna Nagro	20–31	5–11	8th	
2018	Anna Nagro	17–26–1	7–9	T–6th	
2019	Anna Nagro	26–28	9–7	4th	
2020	Anna Nagro	2–17	0–0	N/A	Season cut short due to COVID-19 pandemic
2021	Anna Nagro	19–25	11–13	5th	
2022	Anna Nagro	26–22	17–7	2nd	
Mount St. Mary's Mountaineers (Metro Atlantic Athletic Conference) (2023–present)
2023	Anna Nagro	32–19	15–5	2nd	
2024	Anna Nagro	14–32	6–17	10th	
2025	Anna Nagro	10–40	5–21	12th	
2026	Anna Nagro	20–28	15–12	T–7th	
Total:		612–1,120–5 (.354)			
National champion Postseason invitational champion Conference regular season champion Conference regular season and conference tournament champion Division regular season champion Division regular season and conference tournament champion Conference tournament champion

== See also ==
- List of NCAA Division I softball programs
