= Joe Savage =

Joe Savage may refer to:

- Joe Savage (American football), American football coach
- Joe Savage (rugby union), New Zealand rugby union player
- Joe Savage (runner), winner of the 1973 distance medley relay at the NCAA Division I Indoor Track and Field Championships

== See also ==
- Joseph Savage, American figure skater
