= 1946 Delaware Fightin' Blue Hens football team =

American college football season

1946 Delaware Fightin' Blue Hens football

AP small college national champion Mason–Dixon champion

Cigar Bowl, W 21–7 vs. Rollins
- Conference: Mason–Dixon Conference

Ranking
- AP: No. 19
- Record: 10–0 (3–0 Mason–Dixon)
- Head coach: William D. Murray (4th season)
- Captain: Tony Stalloni
- Home stadium: Wilmington Park (7,000); Frazer Field

1946 Mason–Dixon Conference football standings
	Conf.					Overall
Team	W		L		T	W		L		T
No. 19 Delaware $	3	–	0	–	0	10	–	0	–	0
Johns Hopkins	2	–	0	–	0	5	–	3	–	0
Western Maryland	4	–	1	–	0	5	–	2	–	0
Hampden–Sydney	2	–	2	–	0	2	–	2	–	0
Randolph–Macon	2	–	4	–	0	2	–	4	–	0
Washington College	1	–	5	–	0	1	–	5	–	0
Mount St. Mary's	0	–	2	–	0	0	–	2	–	0
$ – Conference champion; Rankings from AP Poll

The 1946 Delaware Fightin' Blue Hens football team was an American football team that represented the University of Delaware as a member of the Mason–Dixon Conference during the 1946 college football season. In their fourth year under head coach William D. Murray, the Blue Hens compiled a perfect 10–0 record (3–0 in conference games), shut out five opponents, and outscored all opponents by a total of 358 to 45. They won the Mason-Dixon championship, defeated Rollins in the Cigar Bowl, and were selected by the Associated Press as the small college national champion. They were also ranked at No. 82 among all college football teams in the final Litkenhous Difference by Score System rankings for 1946.

Delaware's 1946 season was part of a 32-game unbeaten streak that began on October 26, 1940, and ended on October 3, 1947. The only imperfection was a 7-7 tie with West Chester on September 27, 1941, which was followed by a 26-game winning streak.

Delaware ranked fifth nationally among small-college teams in total offense with an average of 335.1 yards per game. It ranked 14th nationally in total defense, giving up an average of 163.4 yards per game. Key players included quarterback Jim Buchanan; halfbacks Gerald "Doc" Doherty and Art Millman; fullback Paul Hart; team captain and tackles Tony Stalloni and Bob Campbell; guards Gene Carrell and Walt Marusa, ends Carroll Hauptle and Harold "Buck" Thompson; and center Jack Messick.

Buck Thompson set a Delaware record with a 98-yard rushing play against Washington. Doc Doherty had an 83-yard run against Gettysburg.

The team played the majority of its home games at Wilmington Park. The October 26 game against Drexel was the final game played at Frazer Field, and the last game played in Newark until the opening of Delaware Stadium in 1952.

== Schedule ==
Date	Opponent	Rank	Site	Result	Attendance	Source
September 28	Pennsylvania Military*		Wilmington Park; Wilmington, DE	W 25–0	10,000	
October 5	Randolph–Macon		Wilmington Park; Wilmington, DE	W 53–0	7,000	
October 11	Western Maryland		Wilmington Park; Wilmington, DE	W 44–6	7,500	
October 19	at Gettysburg*		Musselman Stadium; Gettysburg, PA	W 27–6	3,500	
October 26	Drexel*^{†}		Frazer Field; Newark, DE	W 52–0	8,000	
November 2	at Franklin & Marshall*		Sponaugle-Williamson Field; Lancaster, PA	W 28–0	6,000	
November 9	at Bucknell*		Memorial Stadium; Lewisburg, PA	W 27–14	4,000–6,000	
November 16	Washington College		Wilmington Park; Wilmington, DE	W 61–0	5,000	
November 23	No. T–19 Muhlenberg*	No. 16	Wilmington Park; Wilmington, DE	W 20–12	15,000	
January 1, 1947	vs. Rollins*	No. 19	Phillips Field; Tampa, FL (Cigar Bowl)	W 21-7	10,000	
*Non-conference game; ^{†}Homecoming; Rankings from AP Poll released prior to the game

== Rankings ==
Ranking movements Legend: ██ Increase in ranking ██ Decrease in ranking — = Not ranked ( ) = First-place votes
	Week								
Poll	1	2	3	4	5	6	7	8	Final
AP	—	—	—	—	—	—	16	15 (2)	19

== After the season ==
The 1947 NFL Draft was held on December 16, 1946. The following Fightin' Blue Hens were selected.

Round	Pick	Player	Position	NFL Club
21	187	Paul Hart	Back	Boston Yanks
30	278	Tony Stalloni	Tackle	Pittsburgh Steelers
