= 1968 Randolph–Macon Yellow Jackets football team =

American college football season

1968 Randolph–Macon Yellow Jackets football

Mason–Dixon champion
- Conference: Mason–Dixon Conference
- Record: 9–0 (5–0 Mason–Dixon)
- Head coach: Ted Keller (5th season)

1968 Mason–Dixon Conference football standings
	Conf.					Overall
Team	W		L		T	W		L		T
Randolph–Macon $	5	–	0	–	0	9	–	0	–	0
Bridgewater	3	–	1	–	0	5	–	3	–	0
Johns Hopkins	1	–	1	–	0	7	–	2	–	0
Western Maryland	2	–	2	–	0	5	–	4	–	0
Hampden–Sydney	1	–	3	–	0	3	–	5	–	2
Shepherd	1	–	3	–	0	2	–	7	–	0
Gallaudet	0	–	3	–	0	1	–	7	–	0
Towson State	0	–	0	–	0	2	–	5	–	0
$ – Conference champion; Conference standings were based on the Dickinson Scoring System.

The 1968 Randolph–Macon Yellow Jackets football team was an American football team that represented Randolph–Macon College as a member of the Mason-Dixon Conference (MDC) during the 1968 NCAA College Division football season. In their fifth year under head coach Ted Keller, the Yellow Jackets compiled a perfect 9–0 record and outscored opponents by a total of 404 to 89.

Freshman halfback Howard Stevens rushed for 1,468 yards and was selected as the most valuable player in the MDC. A total of nine Randolph-Macon players were selected as first-team players on the 1968 All-Mason-Dixon Conference football team: Stevens; end David Evans; offensive tackle Peter McElroy; offensive guard Mike Morris; center John Buonassisi; quarterback Dave Wetzel; defensive end Joe McCue; linebacker Walter Zyglocke; and defensive back Bill Kiblern.

== Schedule ==
Date	Opponent	Site	Result	Attendance	Source
September 21	at Millersville*	Millersville, PA	W 48–15		
September 28	Washington and Lee*	Ashland, VA	W 45–21	5,000	
October 12	at Bridgewater	Bridgewater, VA	W 46–0		
October 19	Maryville (TN)*	Ashland, VA	W 50–0		
October 26	at Johns Hopkins	Baltimore, MD	W 28–13		
November 2	Western Maryland^{†}	Ashland, VA	W 41–14	6,000	
November 9	Gallaudet	Ashland, VA	W 75–6		
November 16	Millsaps*	Ashland, VA	W 35–12	4,000	
November 23	at Hampden–Sydney	Hampden Sydney, VA	W 36–8	7,000	
*Non-conference game; ^{†}Homecoming
