= Marshall Reckard =

American politician (1901–1957)

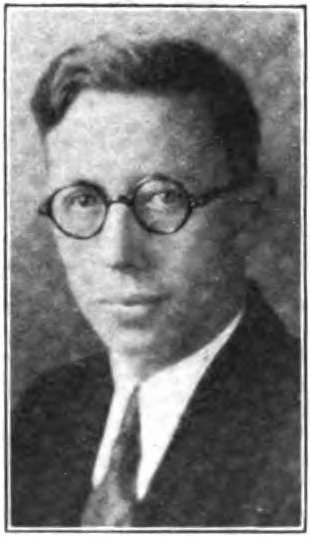
Reckard's official State Assembly portrait, 1931

Marshall H. Reckard (October 1, 1901 – March 16, 1957) was a mechanic and politician from Milwaukee, Wisconsin, who served one term as a Socialist member of the Wisconsin State Assembly.

== Legislative service ==
Reckard was elected to the Assembly in 1930 for the Fourteenth Milwaukee County district (the 17th Ward of the City of Milwaukee), unseating incumbent Republican Assemblyman Alfred Buntin, with 2663 votes to 2555 for Buntin and 1072 for Democrat Thomas E. Casey. He was assigned to the standing committees on labor and on statutory revision.

In 1932, he ran for re-election in what was now the Seventeenth Milwaukee County district, but lost to Democrat Edward C. Werner, with 4,501 votes for Werner, 4,007 for Reckard, 3,881 for Republican Robert Blackwood, and 45 for Independent Steve Torack. In 1934, with Werner having lost his party primary to Martin F. Howard, Reckard came close to regaining his old seat, with 2846 votes to 2890 for Howard and 1316 for Progressive Edwin Luck (close enough that a recount was held).

== Later years ==
By 1944, Reckard had switched to the Progressive Party; he was their nominee in the 17th district, coming in a very weak third to a Democrat and a Republican. Reckard, now working as an auto mechanic in the City of Milwaukee's garage, made unsuccessful runs for Milwaukee county supervisor in 1944 and Milwaukee Alderman in 1946. After the Progressives merged with the Republicans, he ran in the 1946 Republican primary for the Seventh Wisconsin State Senate district, but came in third in a four-way contest.
