= 1949 Western Maryland Green Terror football team =

American college football season

1949 Western Maryland Green Terror football

Mason–Dixon champion
- Conference: Mason–Dixon Conference
- Record: 7–1 (4–0 Mason–Dixon)
- Head coach: Charlie Havens (11th season)
- Captain: Henry A. Corrado
- Home stadium: Hoffa Field

1949 Mason–Dixon Conference football standings
	Conf.					Overall
Team	W		L		T	W		L		T
Western Maryland $	4	–	0	–	0	7	–	1	–	0
Hampden–Sydney	2	–	1	–	0	5	–	4	–	0
Johns Hopkins	2	–	1	–	0	4	–	4	–	0
Washington College	2	–	2	–	1	3	–	2	–	2
Mount St. Mary's	1	–	1	–	0	3	–	6	–	0
Bridgewater	1	–	1	–	0	1	–	3	–	0
Randolph–Macon	2	–	2	–	0	2	–	7	–	0
Catholic University	1	–	3	–	1	1	–	5	–	1
Gallaudet	0	–	4	–	0	0	–	5	–	0
$ – Conference champion; Conference standings were based on the Dickinson Scoring System.

The 1949 Western Maryland Green Terror football team represented Western Maryland College—now known as McDaniel College—as a member of the Mason–Dixon Conference during the 1949 college football season. Led by 11th-year head coach Charlie Havens, the Green Terror compiled an overall record of 7–1 with a mark of 4–0 in conference play, winning the Mason–Dixon title. Henry A. Corrado was the team's captain. Western Maryland played home games at Hoffa Field on Westminster, Maryland.

== Schedule ==
Date	Time	Opponent	Site	Result	Attendance	Source
September 24	2:00 p.m.	at Dickinson*	Biddle Field; Carlisle, PA	W 27–7		
October 1	2:00 p.m.	at Gettysburg*	Memorial Field; Gettysburg, PA	L 0–21		
October 8	2:00 p.m.	at Lebanon Valley*	Lebanon High School Stadium; Lebanon, PA	W 39–7	2,000	
October 15	2:00 p.m.	Washington College	Hoffa Field; Westminster, MD	W 39–6	3,500	
October 22		Mount St. Mary's	Hoffa Field; Westminster, MD	W 32–0		
October 29		Hampden–Sydney^{†}	Hoffa Field; Westminster, MD	W 25–6		
November 12	2:00 p.m.	at Franklin & Marshall*	Williamson Field; Lancaster, PA	W 12–6	5,000	
November 19	2:00 p.m.	at Johns Hopkins	Homewood Field; Baltimore, MD (rivalry)	W 35–7	5,500	
*Non-conference game; ^{†}Homecoming; All times are in Eastern time
