= 1951 Western Maryland Green Terror football team =

American college football season

1951 Western Maryland Green Terror football

Mason–Dixon champion
- Conference: Mason–Dixon Conference
- Record: 8–0 (3–0 Mason–Dixon)
- Head coach: Charlie Havens (13th season)
- Captain: Walt Hart
- Home stadium: Hoffa Field

1951 Mason–Dixon Conference football standings
	Conf.					Overall
Team	W		L		T	W		L		T
Western Maryland $	3	–	0	–	0	8	–	0	–	0
Randolph–Macon	3	–	1	–	1	5	–	3	–	1
Hampden–Sydney	1	–	1	–	2	4	–	3	–	2
Bridgewater	1	–	2	–	0	1	–	3	–	0
Johns Hopkins	0	–	2	–	1	2	–	5	–	1
Gallaudet	0	–	2	–	0	1	–	4	–	0
$ – Conference champion; Conference standings were based on the Dickinson Scoring System.

The 1951 Western Maryland Green Terror football team was an American football team that represented Western Maryland College (now known as McDaniel College) as a member of the Mason–Dixon Conference during the 1951 college football season. In its 13th season under head coach Charlie Havens, the team compiled a perfect 8–0 record (3–0 against conference opponents), won the Mason-Dixon championship, and outscored opponent by a total of 191 to 65. Walt Hart was the team's captain. Western Maryland played home games at Hoffa Field on Westminster, Maryland.

At the end of the season, Western Maryland shunned inquiries from bowl games. Coach Havens noted: "I'm sure we're not going to do anything about them. The kids are well satisfied with a good season, and they've got their studies and winter sports coming up."

The team's leading scorers were Walter McFague (54 points on nine touchdowns) and tailback Mitch Tullai (48 points on eight touchdowns). McFague rushed for 137 yards and three touchdowns against Johns Hopkins.

== Schedule ==
Date	Opponent	Site	Result	Attendance	Source
September 29	at Gettysburg*	Gettysburg, PA (Hen Bream Day)	W 13–6		
October 6	at Randolph–Macon	Day Field; Ashland, VA	W 46–7		
October 13	Franklin & Marshall*	Hoffa Field; Westminster, MD	W 13–7		
October 20	at Dickinson*	Carlisle, PA	W 33–12		
October 27	at Hampden–Sydney	Hampden Sydney, VA	W 20–15		
November 3	Drexel*^{†}	Hoffa Field; Westminster, MD	W 13–0		
November 10	at Lebanon Valley*	Lebanon, PA	W 20–12	5,000	
November 17	at Johns Hopkins*	Homewood Field; Baltimore, MD	W 33–6		
*Non-conference game; ^{†}Homecoming
