= Henry Wilder =

Henry Wilder may refer to:

- Henry Wilder (cricketer) (1798–1836), English cricketer
- Henry L. Wilder (1883–1962), American football and basketball coach and newspaper publisher
