= Mount St. Mary's Mountaineers men's soccer =

American college soccer team

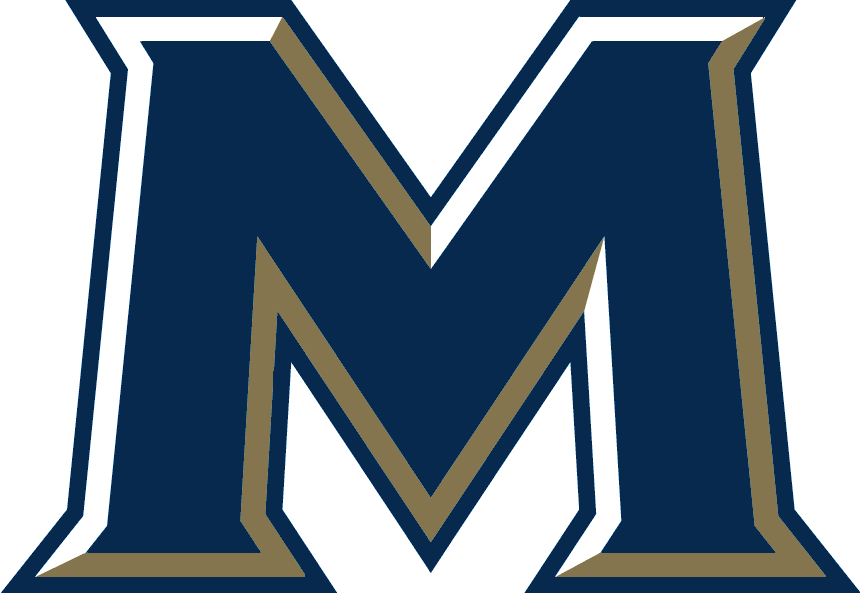
- Founded: 1953; 2018 (reestablished)
- Folded: 2012 (hiatus)
- University: Mount St. Mary's University
- Head coach: Bryan Cunningham
- Conference: MAAC
- Location: Emmitsburg, Maryland, US
- Stadium: Waldron Family Stadium (capacity: 1,000)
- Nickname: Mountaineers, "The Mount"
- Colors: Blue and white
Home	Away

Conference regular season championships
- 1999

The Mount St. Mary's Mountaineers men's soccer team represents Mount St. Mary's University participating in the Metro Atlantic Athletic Conference. The sport was discontinued following the 2012 season for financial reasons but resumed in 2018.

== Coaching history ==
Source=

Dates	Head coach
1953	Bill Clarke
1954–1955	Jim McKeon
1956–1993	Jim Deegan
1994–1999	Mark Mettrick
2000–2012	Rob Ryerson
2018–	Bryan Cunningham

== Record ==
Record table
Season	Coach	Overall	Conference	Standing	Postseason
Mount St. Mary's (Single Division Independent) (1953–1971)
1953	Bill Clarke	1–4–0 .200			
1954–55	Jim McKeon	2–15–0 .074			
1956–71	Jim Deegan	71–90–19			
Mount St. Mary's (Division II Independent) (1972–1987)
1972–87	Jim Deegan	105–106–23			Maryland State; Small College Tournament; 1st – 1981, '82, '86, '87
Mount St. Mary's (Division I Independent) (1988–1988)
1988	Jim Deegan	5–10–0			
Mount St. Mary's (Northeast Conference) (1989–2012)
1988–93	Jim Deegan	35–48–8	12–23–2		
Jim Deegan:		216–254–47 .463			
1994–99	Mark Mettrick	57–42–12 .568	25–14–10	1st 1999	
Mark Mettrick:		57–42–12 .568			
2000–12	Rob Ryerson	74–124–28 .389	89–96–30		
Rob Ryerson:		74–124–28 .389			
2018	Bryan Cunningham	0–0–0 –	0–0–0		
Total:		350–439–48 .447	124-45-17		
National champion Postseason invitational champion Conference regular season champion Conference regular season and conference tournament champion Division regular season champion Division regular season and conference tournament champion Conference tournament champion

== Awards ==
Source=

=== NEC Coach of the Year ===
- (United States) Rob Ryerson (2008)

=== NEC Rookie of the Year ===
- (United States) Zoncher Dennis (2011)
- (Australia) Chris Wheeler (2008)
- (Scotland) Niall Lepper (1999)

=== First Team All-Conference ===
- (United States) Zoncher Dennis (2011)
- (United States) Eric Detzel (2010)
- (Australia) Chris Wheeler (2009 & 2010)
- (Scotland) Vinnie Berry (2008)
- (United States) Howdy Long (2006)
- (England) Luke Strutt (2003)
- (United States) Brandon Scarfield (2002)
- (England) Simon Hodkin (2008)
- (Scotland) Niall Lepper (1999)
- (United States) Rob Ray (1999)

=== Second Team All-Conference ===
- (United States) Zoncher Dennis (2012)
- (United States) Ian Hendrie (2011)
- (United States) Eric Detzel (2009)
- (Australia) Chris Wheeler (2008 & 2011)
- (Scotland) Vinnie Berry (2006)
- (United States) Mark Murphy (2006)
- (Trinidad and Tobago) Kurt Borell (2003)
- (United States) Matt Moneymaker (2000)
- (England) Chris Hallat (2000)
- (United States) Rob Ray (2000)
- (England) Chris Hallat (1999)
- (England) Duncan Gladwin (1998 & 1999)
- (France) Boris Nana-Tonzi (2018)
- Daniel Gerard (1998)
- Mark Southern (1997)
- Simon Hodkin (1997)
