= Ted Keller =

American football player, coach, and athletic director (1931–2009)

Biographical details
- Born: June 30, 1931; Winchester, Virginia, U.S.
- Died: April 10, 2009 (aged 77); Ashland, Virginia, U.S.

Playing career

Football
- 1951–1953: Randolph–Macon
- 1954: Quantico Marines

Coaching career (HC unless noted)

Football
- 1955: James Wood HS (VA) (assistant)
- 1956–1957: Fairfax HS (VA) (assistant)
- 1958–1963: Randolph–Macon (backfield)
- 1964–1981: Randolph–Macon

Golf
- 1964–2002: Randolph–Macon

Administrative career (AD unless noted)
- 1982–1996: Randolph–Macon

Head coaching record
- Overall: 105–56–5
- Bowls: 1–0

Accomplishments and honors

Championships
- Knute Rockne Bowl champion (1969); 4x Mason–Dixon Conference champion (1965, 1967, 1968, and 1969); 3x Old Dominion Athletic Conference champion (1976, 1977, and 1979)

Theodore Sydney Keller (June 30, 1931 – April 10, 2009) was an American football player, coach, and athletic director at Randolph–Macon College.

== Biography ==
Keller was a Mason–Dixon Conference quarterback and shortstop at Randolph–Macon. After graduating, he joined the United States Marine Corps and played quarterback for the Quantico Marines Devil Dogs football team in 1954, completing 29 of 46 passes for 497 yards and eight touchdowns after taking over for an injured Steve Piskach. After leaving the Marines, Keller spent three seasons as a high school football coach. He returned to Randolph–Macon in 1958 as backfield coach and became head coach in 1964. In 18 seasons, he compiled a 105–56–5 record and won seven conference championships (Mason–Dixon Conference titles in 1965, 1967, 1968, and 1969 and Old Dominion Athletic Conference titles in 1976, 1977, and 1979). His 1969 team was the NCAA College Division II East Region Champions after winning the Knute Rockne Bowl. He also coached RMC's golf team and taught courses in physical education and coaching principles. In 1982, he was named athletic director at RMC after the school's first choice, Janice Stocker, chose to resign before starting. Keller succeed Hugh Stephens, who retired after 33 years. He retired in 1996, but continued to coach school's golf team until 2002. He died on April 10, 2009.
