= Charlie Havens =

American football player and sports coach (1903–1996)

Biographical details
- Born: July 12, 1903; Rome, New York, U.S.
- Died: May 12, 1996 (aged 92); Gaithersburg, Maryland, U.S.

Playing career

Football
- 1927–1929: Western Maryland
- 1930: Frankford Yellow Jackets
- Positions: Center, tackle

Coaching career (HC unless noted)

Football
- 1931: Western Maryland (assistant)
- 1933: St. Aloysius Academy
- 1934: Western Maryland (assistant)
- 1935–1941: Western Maryland
- 1946–1956: Western Maryland

Basketball
- 1934–1935: Western Maryland

Baseball
- 1935: Western Maryland
- 1938: Western Maryland
- 1941: Western Maryland
- 1947: Western Maryland
- 1957: Western Maryland

Head coaching record
- Overall: 77–65–6 (college football); 5–13 (college basketball)

Accomplishments and honors

Championships
- 2 Mason–Dixon (1949, 1951)

Charles William Havens (July 12, 1903 – May 12, 1996) was an American football player and coach of football, basketball, baseball.

He played professionally as a center and tackle for one season, in 1930, with the Frankford Yellow Jackets of the National Football League (NFL). Havens served two stints as the head football coach at Western Maryland College—now known as a McDaniel College—from 1935 to 1941 and again from 1946 to 1956, compiling a record of 77–65–6. He was the head baseball coach at Western Maryland for five one-year stints, in 1935, 1938, 1941, 1947, and 1957. Havens also served as the head basketball coach at Western Maryland during the 1934–35 season.

Havens was born and raised in Rome, New York. He died of kidney failure, on May 12, 1996, at Asbury Methodist Village in Gaithersburg, Maryland.

== Head coaching record ==
=== College football ===
Year	Team	Overall	Conference	Standing	Bowl/playoffs
Western Maryland Green Terror (Independent) (1935–1940)
1935	Western Maryland	6–5			
1936	Western Maryland	7–3–1			
1937	Western Maryland	3–6			
1938	Western Maryland	5–2–1			
1939	Western Maryland	1–6			
1940	Western Maryland	2–4–1			
1941	Western Maryland	3–4–1			
Western Maryland Green Terror (Mason–Dixon Conference) (1946–1956)
1946	Western Maryland	5–2	4–1	3rd	
1947	Western Maryland	4–3–1			
1948	Western Maryland	5–2	4–1	3rd	
1949	Western Maryland	7–1	4–0	1st	
1950	Western Maryland	6–2	3–0	2nd	
1951	Western Maryland	8–0	3–0	2nd	
1952	Western Maryland	4–4	1–2	T–3rd	
1953	Western Maryland	4–3–1	2–0–1	2nd	
1954	Western Maryland	4–4	1–1	3rd	
1955	Western Maryland	2–6	0–2	T–5th	
1956	Western Maryland	1–8	0–3	6th	
Western Maryland:		77–65–6			
Total:		77–65–6			
National championship Conference title Conference division title or championship game berth
