= Sid Smith (American football coach) =

American football coach (1912–2006)

Biographical details
- Born: August 3, 1912; Delta, Colorado, U.S.
- Died: February 14, 2006 (aged 93); McPherson, Kansas, U.S.

Coaching career (HC unless noted)
- 1953–1966: McPherson
- 1971–1972: McPherson

Head coaching record
- Overall: 62–82–1

Sidney Lawson Smith (August 3, 1912 – February 14, 2006) was an American college football coach. He served as the head football coach at McPherson College in McPherson, Kansas for 16 seasons, from 1953 to 1966 and again from 1971 to 1972, compiling a record of 62–82–1.

== Head coaching record ==
Year	Team	Overall	Conference	Standing	Bowl/playoffs
McPherson Bulldogs (Kansas Collegiate Athletic Conference) (1953–1966)
1953	McPherson	8–1	6–1	2nd	
1954	McPherson	3–6	3–4	5th	
1955	McPherson	5–3	5–2	T–2nd	
1956	McPherson	5–4	5–2	3rd	
1957	McPherson	6–3	5–2	T–3rd	
1958	McPherson	8–1	6–1	2nd	
1959	McPherson	4–5	3–4	5th	
1960	McPherson	1–7–1	1–7–1	T–8th	
1961	McPherson	3–6	3–6	T–7th	
1962	McPherson	3–6	3–6	7th	
1963	McPherson	3–6	3–6	T–7th	
1964	McPherson	4–5	4–5	5th	
1965	McPherson	2–7	2–7	9th	
1966	McPherson	3–6	3–6	7th	
McPherson Bulldogs (Kansas Collegiate Athletic Conference) (1971–1972)
1971	McPherson	3–7	3–5	T–5th	
1972	McPherson	1–9	1–7	9th	
McPherson:		62–82–1	56–71–1		
Total:		62–82–1			

== See also ==
- List of college football head coaches with non-consecutive tenure
