= Robert T. Hinton =

American football and basketball coach (1878–1948)

Biographical details
- Born: July 11, 1878; Paris, Kentucky, U.S.
- Died: January 24, 1948 (aged 69); Lexington, Kentucky, U.S.

Playing career

Football
- 1896–1889: Georgetown (KY)

Track
- 1902–1906: Yale

Coaching career (HC unless noted)

Football
- 1908–1917: Georgetown (KY)
- 1919: Georgetown (KY)

Basketball
- 1908–1918: Georgetown (KY)
- 1919–1920: Georgetown (KY)

Head coaching record
- Overall: 47–35 (football); 63–75 (basketball)

Robert Taylor Hinton (July 11, 1878 – January 24, 1948) was an American college football and college basketball coach. He served as the head football coach at Georgetown College in Georgetown, Kentucky from 1907 to 1917 and again in 1919, compiling a record of 47–35.

Hinton died on January 24, 1948, at a hospital in Lexington, Kentucky.
