= William T. Harmon =

American sports coach, athletics administrator (1884–1959)

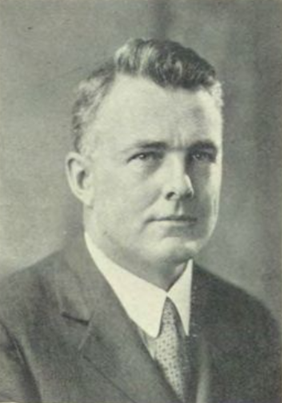
- Harmon pictured in Rig Veda 1930, Illinois College yearbook

Biographical details
- Born: March 21, 1884
- Died: April 21, 1959 (aged 75); Springfield, Illinois, U.S.

Playing career

Football
- c. 1905: Illinois College

Basketball
- c. 1905: Illinois College

Baseball
- c. 1905: Illinois College

Track and field
- c. 1905: Illinois College
- Positions: Halfback (football); Center (basketball); Center fielder (baseball)

Coaching career (HC unless noted)

Football
- 1907–1906: St. Mary's (KY)
- 1910–1916: Illinois College
- 1919–1931: Illinois College

Basketball
- 1910–1927: Illinois College

Baseball
- 1911–1926: Illinois College

Track and field
- 1910–1917: Illinois College

Administrative career (AD unless noted)
- 1910–1917: Illinois College
- 1919–1932: Illinois College
- 1932–1934: IIAC (commissioner)

Head coaching record
- Overall: 90–74–10 (football); 103–118 (basketball)

Accomplishments and honors

Championships
- Football; 1 IIAC (1915)

William Thomas Harmon (March 21, 1884 – April 21, 1959) was an American college football, college basketball, and college baseball, and track and field coach, athletics administrator, and educator. He served as the head football coach at St. Mary's College in St. Mary, Kentucky from 1907 to 1909 and two stints as the head football coach at Illinois College in Jacksonville, Illinois, from 1910 to 1917 and 1919 to 1931.

Harmon attended Illinois College, where he was captain of the football, basketball, baseball, and track and field teams before graduating in 1907. He was appointed head coach and athletic director at his alma mater, Illinois College, in 1910. Harmon's tenure as coach at Illinois College was interrupted by World War I, during which he served as a captain in the United States Army at Camp Grant near Rockford, Illinois. He was succeeded in 1917 as head football coach at Illinois College by his brother, Robert E. Harmon. After the war, in 1919, Harmon returned to coach at the college. He left Illinois College in 1932, and became commissioner of the Illinois Intercollegiate Athletic Conference (IIAC)—later known as the Interstate Intercollegiate Athletic Conference. From 1934 to 1941, Harmon served as managing officer of the Illinois State School for Boys in St. Charles, Illinois.

Harmon died on April 21, 1959, at St. John's Hospital in Springfield, Illinois, after collapsing at his home.

== Head coaching record ==
=== Football ===
Year	Team	Overall	Conference	Standing	Bowl/playoffs
St. Mary's (KY) (Independent) (1907–1909)
1907	St. Mary's	1–2			
1908	St. Mary's	6–0			
1909	St. Mary's	6–1–2			
St. Mary's:		13–3–2			
Illinois College Blueboys (Illinois Intercollegiate Athletic Conference) (1910–1916)
1910	Illinois College	0–6			
1911	Illinois College	2–4			
1912	Illinois College	4–4			
1913	Illinois College	5–1			
1914	Illinois College	4–4			
1915	Illinois College	7–0		1st	
1916	Illinois College	8–1			
Illinois College Blueboys (Illinois Intercollegiate Athletic Conference) (1919–1931)
1919	Illinois College	5–2			
1920	Illinois College	4–3			
1921	Illinois College	5–3			
1922	Illinois College	3–3–1			
1923	Illinois College	3–4–1	3–3–1	T–10th	
1924	Illinois College	5–4	4–4	T–10th	
1925	Illinois College	3–4–3	2–4–3	T–14th	
1926	Illinois College	6–2	6–2	T–4th	
1927	Illinois College	3–4–1	3–4–1	14th	
1928	Illinois College	4–5	4–5	11th	
1929	Illinois College	4–4	3–3	T–12th	
1930	Illinois College	0–8	0–7	22nd	
1931	Illinois College	2–5–2	1–4–2	19th	
Illinois College:		77–71–8			
Total:		90–74–10			
National championship Conference title Conference division title or championship game berth
