= Daryl C. McNeill =

American college football coach (1960–2013)

Biographical details
- Born: September 20, 1960; Augusta, Georgia, U.S.
- Died: October 19, 2013 (aged 53); Seneca, South Carolina, U.S.

Coaching career (HC unless noted)
- 1984: South Carolina State (GA)
- 1985–1987: South Carolina State (RB)
- 1988–1992: Savannah State (OC)
- 1993–1994: Tennessee State (OC/WR)
- 1995–1996: Johnson C. Smith
- 1997–1998: Savannah State
- 2005–2009: Johnson C. Smith
- 2010–2012: Clark Atlanta

Head coaching record
- Overall: 39–73

Daryl Chester "Brick" McNeill Sr. (September 20, 1960 – October 19, 2013) was an American college football coach. He served as the head football coach at Johnson C. Smith University from 1995 to 1998 and again from 2005 to 2009. He also served as the head football coach at Savannah State University from 1997 to 1998 and Clark Atlanta University from 2010 to 2012

McNeill was born in Augusta, Georgia, and grew up in Seneca, South Carolina, where he attended Seneca High School. He received a Bachelor of Science degree and a Master of Science in business education from South Carolina State University. McNeill died on October 19, 2013, at the Cottingham Hospice House in Seneca.

== Head coaching record ==
Year	Team	Overall	Conference	Standing	Bowl/playoffs
Johnson C. Smith Golden Bulls (Central Intercollegiate Athletic Association) (1995–1996)
1995	Johnson C. Smith	2–8	2–6	T–7th	
1996	Johnson C. Smith	7–3	5–3	T–4th	
Savannah State Tigers (Southern Intercollegiate Athletic Conference) (1997–1998)
1997	Savannah State	3–8	1–5	9th	
1998	Savannah State	7–4	4–2	T–4th	
Savannah State:		10–12	5–7		
Johnson C. Smith Golden Bulls (Central Intercollegiate Athletic Association) (2005–2008)
2005	Johnson C. Smith	0–10	0–7	6th (South)	
2006	Johnson C. Smith	6–4	4–3	T–2nd (South)	
2007	Johnson C. Smith	3–7	2–5	T–3rd (South)	
2008	Johnson C. Smith	3–7	2–5	T–4th (South)	
Johnson C. Smith:		21–39	15–29		
Clark Atlanta Panthers (Southern Intercollegiate Athletic Conference) (2010–2012)
2010	Clark Atlanta	4–6	4–5	T–5th	
2011	Clark Atlanta	2–8	1–6	T–4th (East)	
2012	Clark Atlanta	2–8	1–6	T–4th (East)	
Clark Atlanta:		8–22	6–17		
Total:		39–73			
