= Robert E. Harmon =

American sports coach (1882–1959)

Biographical details
- Born: 1882; Jacksonville, Illinois, U.S.
- Died: September 28, 1959 (aged 77); Jacksonville, Illinois, U.S.

Playing career

Football
- c. 1900: Illinois College
- 1905–1906: Denver
- 1907: Creighton

Baseball
- 1904: Illinois College

Coaching career (HC unless noted)

Football
- 1903: Illinois College
- 1908–1910: All Hallows
- 1911: Loyola (IL)
- 1912: Butte HS (MT)
- 1913–1914: Gonzaga
- 1915–1916: University Farm
- 1917: Illinois College
- 1919–1920: Santa Clara
- 1921–1924: Quincy (IL)

Basketball
- 1913–1915: Gonzaga
- 1919–1921: Santa Clara

Baseball
- 1915: Gonzaga
- 1921: Santa Clara
- 1922–?: Quincy (IL)

Administrative career (AD unless noted)
- 1913–1915: Gonzaga

Head coaching record
- Overall: 14–13 (basketball); 6–9–1 (baseball, excluding Quincy)

Robert Emmett "Red Bob" Harmon (1882 – September 28, 1959) was an American college football, college basketball, and college baseball coach. He served as the head football coach at Illinois College in 1903 and 1917, Loyola University Chicago in 1911, Gonzaga University from 1913 to 1914, the University Farm (now known as the University of California, Davis) from 1915 to 1916, and the University of Santa Clara— (now known as Santa Clara University) from 1919 to 1920, and at Quincy College and Seminary (now known as Quincy University) in Quincy, Illinois from 1922 to 1924.

== Coaching career ==
Harmon was the head coach for the Gonzaga Bulldogs men's basketball team from 1913 to 1915. He recorded a 10–4 (.714) record during his two seasons.

In 1917, Harmon returned to his alma mater, Illinois College in Jacksonville, Illinois, to become head football coach, succeeding his brother, William T. Harmon, who was serving as a captain in the United States Army at Camp Grant near Rockford, Illinois.

== Law career and death ==
Harmon was a graduate of the Loyola University Chicago School of Law and did graduate work at the University of Chicago and the University of Michigan. While he was coaching at Gonzaga, Harmon also practiced law with the offices of Luby and Pierson. At Santa Clara, he taught law as a member of the faculty. In 1930, Harmon passed the Illinois state bar and began a law practice in Jacksonville, Illinois.

Harmon died at the age of 77, on September 28, 1959, at Our Saviour's Hospital in Jacksonville, following an illness lasting several months.

== Head coaching record ==
=== Football ===
Year	Team	Overall	Conference	Standing	Bowl/playoffs
Illinois College Blueboys (Independent) (1903)
1903	Illinois College	6–2			
Loyola University Chicago (Independent) (1911)
1911	Loyola University Chicago	2–5			
Loyola University Chicago:		2–5			
Gonzaga Blue and White (Independent) (1913–1914)
1913	Gonzaga	7–2			
1914	Gonzaga	3–2–1			
Gonzaga:		10–4–1			
University Farm (Independent) (1915–1916)
1915	University Farm	3–2			
1916	University Farm	7–1			
University Farm:		10–3			
Illinois College Blueboys (Illinois Intercollegiate Athletic Conference) (1917)
1917	Illinois College	0–4–1			
Illinois College:		6–6–1			
Santa Clara Missionites (Independent) (1919–1920)
1919	Santa Clara	2–4			
1920	Santa Clara	5–1			
Santa Clara:		7–5			
Quincy Hawks (Independent) (1922–1924)
1922	Quincy	4–3			
1923	Quincy	2–2–1			
1924	Quincy	2–4			
Quincy:		8–9–1			
Total:					
