= Donzell Young =

American football coach and college athletics administrator

Biographical details
- Born: March 31, 1939
- Died: July 16, 2006 (aged 67)

Coaching career (HC unless noted)
- 1971–1972: Arkansas–Pine Bluff (OL)
- 1973–1975: Arkansas–Pine Bluff
- 1976–1979: Pine Bluff HS (AR) (assistant)
- 1980–1983: Pine Bluff HS (AR)
- 1984–1986: Arkansas–Pine Bluff

Administrative career (AD unless noted)
- 1984–1987: Arkansas–Pine Bluff

Head coaching record
- Overall: 10–45–2 (college)

Donzell Young (March 31, 1939 – July 16, 2006) was an American football coach and college athletics administrator. He served two stints as the head football coach at the University of Arkansas at Pine Bluff, from 1973 to 1975 and again from 1984 to 1986, compiling a record of 10–45–2.

Young went to Arkansas–Pine Bluff as an assistant coach in 1971. He was fired after the 1975 season in which Golden Lions finished with a record of 0–11. Young then became an assistant football coach at Pine Bluff High School, and was promoted to head football coach in 1980 after four years as an assistant. He led his teams there to a record of 29–12–4 in four season as head coach before returning to Pine Bluff in 1984 as head football coach and athletic director.

== Head coaching record ==
=== College ===
| Year | Team | Overall | Conference | Standing | Bowl/playoffs |
|---|---|---|---|---|---|
Arkansas–Pine Bluff Golden Lions (NCAA Division II independent) (1973–1975)
| 1973 | Arkansas–Pine Bluff | 3–5–1 | | | |
| 1974 | Arkansas–Pine Bluff | 3–5 | | | |
| 1975 | Arkansas–Pine Bluff | 0–11 | | | |
Arkansas–Pine Bluff Golden Lions (NAIA Division I independent) (1984)
| 1984 | Arkansas–Pine Bluff | 1–7–1 | | | |
Arkansas–Pine Bluff Golden Lions (Arkansas Intercollegiate Conference) (1985–1986)
| 1985 | Arkansas–Pine Bluff | 2–8 | 0–7 | 8th | |
| 1986 | Arkansas–Pine Bluff | 1–9 | 0–7 | 8th | |
| Arkansas–Pine Bluff: | | 10–45–2 | 0–14 | | |
| Total: | | 10–45–2 | | | |

== See also ==
- List of college football head coaches with non-consecutive tenure
