= Charles B. Hedgcock =

American sports coach (1886–1986)

Biographical details
- Born: May 27, 1886; Schuyler County, Illinois, U.S.
- Died: February 3, 1986 (aged 99)

Coaching career (HC unless noted)

Football
- 1921: Knox (IL) (assistant)
- 1922–1933: Northern State Normal
- 1936–1937: Northern Michigan

Basketball
- 1921–1922: Knox (IL) (assistant)
- 1922–1942: Northern State Normal / Northern Michigan
- 1945–1947: Northern Michigan

Baseball
- 1922: Knox (IL)

Head coaching record
- Overall: 29–51–5 (college football); 162–138 (college basketball)

Charles Bolton Hedgcock (May 27, 1886 – February 3, 1986) was an American football and basketball coach and college athletics administrator.

Hedgcock graduated from Knox College in Galesburg, Illinois in 1911. He began his career at Marshfield High School and Menominee High School in Menominee, Michigan, where he compiled a 39–5–3 record as football coach. Hedgcock returned to Knox in 1921 as the director of the physical education department. He was in charge of all intramural athletics, served as an assistant coach in football and basketball under head coach Sam Barry, and was head coach of the baseball team.

In 1922, Hedgcock joined the faculty at Northern State Normal School (now known as Northern Michigan University) in Marquette, Michigan, as head of the department of health, physical education and recreation. He held that position for 34 years. He also served as Northern Michigan's coach of all sports for 11 years, and as head basketball coach for 22 years (1922–1942, 1945–1947) and head football coach for 14 years (1922–1933, 1936–1937). He retired in 1956. In 1943, he served at the War Training Service flight school in Escanaba, Michigan.

The physical education building at Northern Michigan was named the C.B. Hedgcock Fieldhouse after Hedgcock in 1964. Hedgccock was inducted into the Upper Peninsuala Sports Hall of Fame in 1975 and Northern Michigan Hall of Fame in 1976.

Hedgcock later lived in Medford, New Jersey. He died on February 3, 1986.
