= Roger A. Greene =

American football player, coach, and hospital administrator (1887–1960)

Roger Greene
Biographical details
- Born: September 26, 1887; Hoosick Falls, New York, U.S.
- Died: August 29, 1960 (aged 72); Lebanon, Pennsylvania, U.S.

Playing career
- 1907–1909: Marietta
- 1911–1912: Penn
- Position: Lineman

Coaching career (HC unless noted)
- 1913–1915: Bates
- 1916: Colby
- 1919–1920: Bowdoin
- 1923: Colby

Roger A. Greene (September 26, 1887 – August 29, 1960) was an American college football player and coach, attorney, and hospital administrator. He served as the head coach at Bates College from 1913 to 1915, Colby College in 1916 and 1923, and Bowdoin College from 1919 to 1920.

== Biography ==
Greene was born in Hoosick Falls, New York to George E. and Mary (Foster) Greene. He played football for two years at Marietta College and was a lineman on the Penn Quakers football team while he attended the University of Pennsylvania Law School. He graduated in 1913 and became head coach at Bates College that fall. During the offseason, he continued his law studies in the office of Newell & Skelton and passed the bar in August 1914. Shortly thereafter, he and James J. Meehan opened a law office in the Manufacturer's National Bank in Lewiston, Maine.

In 1916, Greene left Bates to take a higher-paying coaching position at Colby College. His team won that year's Maine Intercollegiate Athletic Association championship.

In 1917, Greene was elected city solicitor of Lewiston. That July, he became commanding officer of the Nelson Dingley Battery of the Maine National Guard. The Dingley Battery became the 101st Trench Mortar Battery of the 26th Infantry Division and saw action in France during World War I. In 1918, he was promoted to Major and placed on the staff of the commanding general of the field artillery of the Third Army Corps as an advisor on trench artillery.

Greene was discharged in 1919 and returned to Lewiston. He resumed his law practice and was once again elected city solicitor. Due to business concerns, he chose to take a coaching job closer to home and signed with Bowdoin College rather than return to Colby. He decided to step away from coaching following the 1920 season, despite multiple job offers, including one from his alma mater, Marietta College.

In 1920, Greene was a Republican candidate for district attorney of Androscoggin County, Maine. From 1921 to 1923, he was secretary of the Lewiston chamber of commerce.

On March 25, 1922, Greene underwent an operation at Central Maine Hospital for an abscess in each ear. Following surgery, he became severely ill and it appeared he would die. However, by April 5, his condition had vastly improved.

In 1923, Greene returned to Colby College for a second stint as head football coach. He once again led the team to a Maine Intercollegiate Athletic Association championship.

In 1924, he moved to Warren, Pennsylvania, where he was a personnel director for a steel mill. He later worked as a standardization accountant in the Pennsylvania state personnel bureau. From 1930 to 1948, he was the superintendent of Pottsville Hospital in Pottsville, Pennsylvania. During World War II, he was a consultant for the United States Public Health Service and compiled a list of possible sites for emergency hospitals in case of enemy bombings. He was also active in the Hospital Association of Pennsylvania and served as the chairman of organization's legislative committee and later as its president. He joined the Pennsylvania Department of Health in 1948 and served as administrator of the State Hospital for Crippled Children in Elizabethtown, Pennsylvania until his retirement on June 14, 1960. Greene died on August 29, 1960, at Veterans' Hospital in Lebanon, Pennsylvania.
