= Mike Taylor (American football, born 1954) =

American football coach (born c.1954)

Biographical details
- Born: c. 1954 (age 71–72); Savannah, Georgia, U.S.
- Education: Newberry College (1976); Georgetown College (1978)

Playing career

Football
- 1972–1976: Newberry

Baseball
- 1972–1976: Newberry
- Positions: Defensive back, tailback (football)

Coaching career (HC unless noted)

Football
- 1977: Georgetown (KY) (assistant)
- 1978–1982: Lenoir–Rhyne (DB)
- 1983: East Tennessee State (DB)
- 1984–1985: East Tennessee State (WR)
- 1986: Lenoir–Rhyne (DC)
- 1987–1991: North Greenville
- 1992–2002: Newberry
- 2004–2008: North Greenville

Track and field
- 1978–1982: Lenoir–Rhyne (assistant)

Head coaching record
- Overall: 69–105 (college); 31–3 (junior college)
- Bowls: 1–0 (college)

Accomplishments and honors

Awards
- North Greenville Hall of Fame (2001)

Michael Taylor (born c. 1954) is an American former college football coach. He was the head football coach for North Greenville College—now known as North Greenville University—from 1987 to 1991 and from 2004 to 2008 and Newberry College from 1992 to 2002.

== Playing career ==
Taylor was a native of Savannah, Georgia, and was a two-sport athlete for H. V. Jenkins High School and Newberry College. He participated in football and baseball. For the football team, he was a tailback for his first two seasons as he rushed for 518 yards as a sophomore in 1973. He suffered a season-ending injury during the 1974 football season. In 1975, he transitioned to defensive back.

== Coaching career ==
In 1977, after he graduated from Newberry, he was hired as an assistant football coach for Georgetown (KY). After one season he was hired as the defensive backs coach for Lenoir–Rhyne. He coached the Bears defensive backfield for five seasons before being hired for the same position for East Tennessee State in 1983. Before the next season, he transitioned from coaching the defensive backs to coaching the wide receivers. In 1986, he rejoined Lenoir–Rhyne as the team's defensive coordinator. He resigned following the season.

After only one season with Lenoir–Rhyne, Taylor was hired as the head football coach for North Greenville. He was hired to coach the start-up junior college team that announced they were reinstating the previously discontinued football program. The team started practicing in the spring of 1988 and played their first varsity season in the fall of 1988. During his four-year tenure with the junior college, he finished with an overall record of 31–3, including undefeated seasons in his second and last seasons. His teams were known for their defensive prowess and his option running game. In 1992, he was hired as the head football coach for his alma mater, Newberry. In eleven seasons as head coach he led the team to a 47–73 record including a fifteen-game South Atlantic Conference (SAC) conference game losing streak. His best season came in 1996, the teams first season back in the SAC, as he led the team to a 7–4 record. He was fired following a 1–10 record in 2002. After not coaching in 2003, Taylor rejoined North Greenville, which was now a member of the NCAA Division II. He led the team to a 22–32 record in five seasons at the helm. His best season came in 2006 when his team finished 10–2 and won the Victory Bowl. He resigned after the 2008 season.

== Honors ==
In 2001, Taylor was inducted into the North Greenville Hall of Fame as a coach.

== Head coaching record ==
=== College ===
Year	Team	Overall	Conference	Standing	Bowl/playoffs
Newberry Indians (NCAA Division II independent) (1992–1995)
1992	Newberry	5–6			
1993	Newberry	2–8			
1994	Newberry	4–7			
1995	Newberry	5–6			
Newberry Indians (South Atlantic Conference) (1996–2002)
1996	Newberry	7–4	0–0	N/A	
1997	Newberry	4–7	2–5	7th	
1998	Newberry	6–5	3–4	T–5th	
1999	Newberry	5–6	3–5	6th	
2000	Newberry	4–7	1–6	7th	
2001	Newberry	4–7	0–7	8th	
2002	Newberry	1–10	0–7	8th	
Newberry:		47–73			
North Greenville Crusaders (NCAA Division II independent) (2004–2008)
2004	North Greenville	3–7			
2005	North Greenville	2–8			
2006	North Greenville	10–2			W Victory
2007	North Greenville	5–6			
2008	North Greenville	2–9			
North Greenville:		22–32			
Total:		69–105			

=== Junior college ===
Year	Team	Overall	Conference	Standing	Bowl/playoffs	NJCAA^{#}
North Greenville Mounties (NJCAA independent) (1988–1991)
1988	North Greenville	8–1				
1989	North Greenville	8–0				11
1990	North Greenville	7–2				
1991	North Greenville	8–0				7
North Greenville:		31–3				
Total:		31–3				
