= Henry T. Bream =

Baseball, football and basketball player

Biographical details
- Born: November 21, 1899; York Springs, Pennsylvania, U.S.
- Died: June 17, 1990 (aged 90)

Playing career

Football
- 1920–1923: Gettysburg

Baseball
- 1921–1924: Gettysburg
- 1928: Hanover Raiders

Basketball
- 1920–1924: Gettysburg

Coaching career (HC unless noted)

Football
- 1924–1925: Phoenixville HS (PA)
- 1926: Gettysburg (freshmen)
- 1927–1951: Gettysburg

Basketball
- 1927–1955: Gettysburg

Baseball
- 1952–1956: Gettysburg

Track
- 1932–1936: Gettysburg

Head coaching record
- Overall: 104–69–12 (college football); 314–183 (college basketball); 44–24–2 (college baseball)

Henry T. Bream Sr. (November 21, 1899 – June 17, 1990) was an American minor league baseball player and a collegiate American football, basketball and baseball player and coach. He served as the head football coach at Gettysburg College in Gettysburg, Pennsylvania from 1927 to 1951. He also served as the school's head men's basketball coach at from 1927 to 1955.
