= Chester Hynes =

American football coach

Coaching career (HC unless noted)
- 1944–1945: Arkansas AM&N

Head coaching record
- Overall: 3–13

Chester E. Hynes was an American college football coach. He served as the head football coach at Arkansas Agricultural, Mechanical & Normal College (Arkansas AM&N)—now known as University of Arkansas at Pine Bluff—for two seasons, from to 1944 to 1945, compiling a record of 3–13.

== Head coaching record ==
Year	Team	Overall	Conference	Standing	Bowl/playoffs
Arkansas AM&N Lions (Southwestern Athletic Conference) (1944–1945)
1944	Arkansas AM&N	1–7	0–6	7th	
1945	Arkansas AM&N	2–6	1–5	7th	
Arkansas AM&N:		3–13	1–11		
Total:		3–13			
