= LaRue Van Meter =

American sports coach and attorney

Biographical details
- Born: 1898; Williamsville, Illinois, U.S.
- Died: December 17, 1981 (aged 83); Falls Church, Virginia, U.S.
- Education: Illinois Wesleyan; George Washington (1943)

Coaching career (HC unless noted)

Football
- 1932–1933: Illinois College
- 1937: Illinois College

Basketball
- 1932–1938: Illinois College

Head coaching record
- Overall: 14–8–1 (football); 55–43 (basketball)

Accomplishments and honors

Championships
- Football; 1 IIAC (1937)

LaRue Van Meter (1898 – December 17, 1981) was an attorney and an American football and basketball coach. He served as the head basketball coach at Illinois College in Jacksonville, Illinois from 1932 to 1938.

Van Meter was the city attorney of Falls Church, Virginia from 1948 until his retirement in 1974.

== Head coaching record ==
Year	Team	Overall	Conference	Standing	Bowl/playoffs
Illinois College Blueboys (Illinois Intercollegiate Athletic Conference) (1932–1933)
1932	Illinois College	3–4	3–3	T–10th	
1933	Illinois College	4–2–1	4–1–1	T–5th	
Illinois College Blueboys (Illinois Intercollegiate Athletic Conference) (1937)
1937	Illinois College	7–2	5–0	T–1st	
Illinois College:		14–8–1	12–4–1		
Total:		14–8–1			
National championship Conference title Conference division title or championship game berth
