= Bryan Cunningham =

American soccer player and coach

Personal information
- Place of birth: Allentown, Pennsylvania
- Position: Midfielder

College career
Years	Team	Apps	(Gls)
1993–1996	Pfeiffer Falcons		

Managerial career
- 1997–2001: Appalachian State Mountaineers (assistant)
- 2002–2004: South Carolina Gamecocks (assistant)
- 2005–2007: UCF Knights (assistant)
- 2007–2016: UCF Knights
- 2017–2023: Mount St. Mary's Mountaineers

Bryan Cunningham is an American soccer coach. He restarted a program that had been dormant since 2012 and returned to competition in 2018.

He was the head coach at the University of Central Florida from 2007 to 2016. His 2007 team tied a school record with 3 conference wins, and set a school mark with its highest positioning in Conference USA at 3rd. From 2005 to 2007, he was an assistant coach at UCF, and was the head recruiting coordinator at the school. He also served as an assistant coach at Appalachian State University, and the University of South Carolina. He played college soccer at Pfeiffer University where he was a three-time captain.

Cunningham resigned as head coach at Mount St. Mary's University in November 2023.
