= James W. Hazzard =

American football coach, athletics administrator, and professor

Playing career

Football
- 1925–1928: Clark (GA)

Basketball
- c. 1925–1929: Clark (GA)

Track and field
- c. 1925–1929: Clark (GA)
- Position: Tackle (football)

Coaching career (HC unless noted)

Football
- 1929–1931: New Orleans University
- 1932–1934: Arkansas AM&N
- 1936: Arkansas AM&N

Administrative career (AD unless noted)
- ?–1932: New Orleans University

James William "Skip" Hazzard was an American college football player and coach, athletics administrator, and biology professor. He served as the head football coach at Arkansas Agricultural, Mechanical & Normal College (Arkansas AM&N)—now known as University of Arkansas at Pine Bluff—for four seasons, from 1932 to 1934 and again in 1936, compiling a record of 19–14–5. Hazzard played football as a tackle for four seasons at Clark College—now known as Clark Atlanta University—captained the basketball team, and ran on the track team before graduating in 1929. He then coached and served as athletic director at New Orleans University prior to his hiring at Arkansas AM&N in 1932. He left Arkansas AM&N in 1935 to study at Iowa State University. Hazzard returned to Arkansas AM&N as head football coach in 1936.

A native of Florida, Hazzard also attended Hampton Institute—now known as Hampton University. He earned a Bachelor of Science degree from Clark and a Master of Science degree from Iowa State. He revied a Doctor of Philosophy degree in zoology from Cornell University in 1940. At Arkansas AM&N, Hazzard was also a professor of biology and head of the Unit of Biology. In the fall of 1940, he went to teach at Southern University in Baton Rouge, Louisiana.

== Head coaching record ==
Year	Team	Overall	Conference	Standing	Bowl/playoffs
Arkansas AM&N Lions (Independent) (1932–1934)
1932	Arkansas AM&N	4–3–2			
1933	Arkansas AM&N	6–3			
1934	Arkansas AM&N	4–4–2			
Arkansas AM&N Lions (Southwestern Athletic Conference) (1936)
1936	Arkansas AM&N	5–4–1	2–3–1	5th	
Arkansas AM&N:		19–14–5	2–3–1		
Total:					
