= Maurice McCarthy (American football) =

American football player and coach

Playing career
- 1900: Fordham

Coaching career (HC unless noted)
- 1900–1901: Fordham

Head coaching record
- Overall: 4–2–3

Maurice J. McCarthy was an American college football player and coach. He was the head football coach at Fordham University in 1900 and co-head coach in 1901 with Fred L. Smith. He compiled an overall record of 4–2–3. McCarthy was also a physical instructor at Fordham.

== Head coaching record ==
Year	Team	Overall	Conference	Standing	Bowl/playoffs
Fordham (Independent) (1900–1901)
1900	Fordham	2–1–2			
1901	Fordham	2–1–1			
Fordham:		4–2–3			
Total:		4–2–3			
