= Art Martynuska =

American athletic director

Biographical details
- Born: April 17, 1930; Lilly, Pennsylvania, U.S.
- Died: December 24, 2006 (aged 76); Cleveland, Ohio, U.S.

Coaching career (HC unless noted)

Football
- 1969–1979: Saint Francis (PA)
- 1981: Saint Francis (PA)

Basketball
- 1968–1978: Saint Francis (PA) (assistant)

Administrative career (AD unless noted)
- 1979–1984: Saint Francis (PA)

Head coaching record
- Overall: 45–51–3

Art Martynuska (April 17, 1930 – December 24, 2006) was an athletic director and head football coach at Saint Francis University.

== Career ==
Martynuska served in a variety of roles at Saint Francis from 1968 to 1984, including head football coach (1969–81), assistant basketball coach (1968–78), and director of athletics (1979–84). He resigned as football coach on May 7, 1982, citing health issues. He later resigned his role as athletics director on June 1, 1984, and transitioned to assistant director of counseling at the school.

He was posthumously inducted into the Saint Francis University Athletics Hall of Fame in 2007.

== Family ==
Martynuska was married for over 50 years, and had three children.

== Head coaching record ==
Year	Team	Overall	Conference	Standing	Bowl/playoffs
Saint Francis Red Flash (Club) (1969–1977)
1969	Saint Francis	1–5			
1970	Saint Francis	3–4			
1971	Saint Francis	7–1			
1972	Saint Francis	5–4			
1973	Saint Francis	5–4			
1974	Saint Francis	7–1			
1975	Saint Francis	3–4–1			
1976	Saint Francis	2–6			
1977	Saint Francis	3–5–1			
Saint Francis Red Flash (NCAA Division III independent) (1978–1979)
1978	Saint Francis	4–5			
1979	Saint Francis	2–6			
Saint Francis Red Flash (NCAA Division III independent) (1981)
1981	Saint Francis	3–6–1			
Saint Francis:		3–6–1			
Total:		45–51–3			
