= Edward C. Werner =

American politician

Edward C. Werner (May 26, 1850 in Milwaukee, Wisconsin – January 24, 1939) was an American politician who was a member of the Wisconsin State Assembly. He was born on May 26, 1850, in Milwaukee, Wisconsin, where he received a religious-based education. Werner was additionally a justice of the peace.
