= Henry L. Wilder =

American football and basketball coach (1883–1962)

Biographical details
- Born: June 6, 1883; Hingham, Massachusetts U.S.
- Died: December 9, 1962 (aged 79); Sinking Spring, Pennsylvania, U.S.
- Education: Lebanon Valley (AB); Dickinson (BS); Columbia (MA)

Coaching career (HC unless noted)

Football
- 1906–1907: Lebanon Valley
- 1911: Lebanon Valley
- 1921–1922: Lebanon Valley

Basketball
- 1906–1908: Lebanon Valley
- 1909–1910: Lebanon Valley
- 1911–1912: Lebanon Valley

Baseball
- 1907: Lebanon Valley
- 1912: Lebanon Valley

Head coaching record
- Overall: 9–29–2 (college football); 6–11 (college baseball)

Henry Lincoln "Stub" Wilder (June 6, 1883 – December 9, 1962) was an American football, basketball, and baseball coach and newspaper publisher. He served as three stints as head football coach at Lebanon Valley College in Annville Township, Pennsylvania (1906–1907, 1911, 1921–1922), compiling a record of 9–29–2. Wilder also three stints as the head basketball coach at Lebanon Valley (1906–1908, 1909–1910, 1911–1912). He also coached football for ten seasons at Lebanon High School in Lebanon, Pennsylvania and for one season at Conway Hall, a prep school of Dickinson College.

Wilder was the publisher of the Lebanon Daily News. He died on December 9, 1962, of a heart attack while visiting friends in Sinking Spring, Pennsylvania.

== Head coaching record ==
=== College football ===
Year	Team	Overall	Conference	Standing	Bowl/playoffs
Lebanon Valley Flying Dutchmen (Independent) (1906–1907)
1906	Lebanon Valley	1–5–1			
1907	Lebanon Valley	0–6			
Lebanon Valley Flying Dutchmen (Independent) (1911)
1911	Lebanon Valley	2–7			
Lebanon Valley Flying Dutchmen (Independent) (1921–1922)
1921	Lebanon Valley	2–6–1			
1922	Lebanon Valley	4–5			
Lebanon Valley:		9–29–2			
Total:		9–29–2			
