= Edward A. Werner =

American football coach and administrator

Biographical details
- Born: February 9, 1882; Hanover, Kansas, U.S.

Playing career
- 1906: Springfield Training School

Coaching career (HC unless noted)
- 1907–1908: Otterbein
- 1909–1910: Trinity (TX)
- 1914: Trinity (TX)
- 1918–1928: Riverside Univ. HS (WI)

Administrative career (AD unless noted)
- 1907–1909: Otterbein
- 1909–1911: Trinity (TX)
- 1914–1916: Trinity (TX)

Head coaching record
- Overall: 18–20–5

Edward August Werner (born February 9, 1882) was an American college football coach and athletics administrator. He served as the head football coach at Otterbein University in Westerville, Ohio from 1907 to 1908 and Trinity University in Waxahachie, Texas from 1909 to 1910 and again in 1914, compiling a career college football coaching record of 18–20–5.

== Head coaching record ==
=== College ===
Year	Team	Overall	Conference	Standing	Bowl/playoffs
Otterbein Cardinals (Independent) (1907–1908)
1907	Otterbein	2–6			
1908	Otterbein	4–5			
Otterbein:		6–11			
Trinity Tigers (Independent) (1909–1910)
1909	Trinity	3–4–1			
1910	Trinity	5–3–1			
Trinity Tigers (Independent) (1914)
1914	Trinity	4–2–3			
Trinity:		12–9–5			
Total:		18–20–5			
