= Joe Savage (American football) =

American football coach

Biographical details
- Born: April 29, 1887; Pennsylvania, U.S.
- Died: July 26, 1961 (aged 74); Johnstown, Pennsylvania, U.S.

Coaching career (HC unless noted)
- 1911–1912: Saint Francis (PA)
- 1917: Saint Francis (PA)
- 1919: Saint Francis (PA)

Head coaching record
- Overall: 23–10–2

Joseph W. Savage (April 29, 1887 – July 26, 1961) was an American football coach and a member of the Third Order of Saint Francis within the Catholic Church. He served as the head football coach at Saint Francis College—now known as Saint Francis University—in Loretto, Pennsylvania from 1911 to 1912 and in 1917 and 1919.
