= Mount St. Mary's Mountaineers =

Athletics teams of Mount St. Mary's University

- University: Mount St. Mary's University
- Nickname: Mountaineers
- Association: NCAA Division I
- Conference: Metro Atlantic Athletic Conference (primary); MAWPC (water polo); NEC (women's bowling); CC (women's flag football)
- Athletic director: Brad Davis
- Location: Emmitsburg, Maryland
- Varsity teams: 23
- Basketball arena: Knott Arena
- Baseball stadium: Straw Family Stadium
- Colors: Blue, White, and Old Gold
- Mascot: Emmit S. Burg
- Website: mountathletics.com
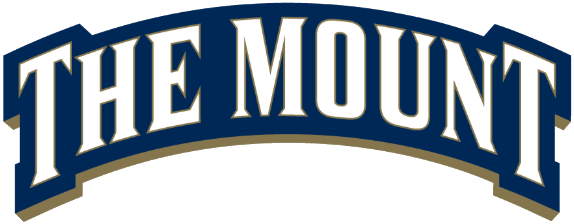

The Mount St. Mary's Mountaineers athletic teams represent Mount St. Mary's University in Emmitsburg, Maryland. "The Mount" competes in National Collegiate Athletic Association (NCAA) Division I athletics as a member of the Metro Atlantic Athletic Conference (MAAC).

The Mount sponsors 22 intercollegiate sports. Men's sports include baseball, basketball, cross country, golf, lacrosse, soccer, swimming & diving, tennis, track & field and water polo; while women's sports include soccer, basketball, bowling, cross country, flag football, golf, lacrosse, rugby, softball, swimming & diving, tennis, track & field and water polo.

== Athletic divisions and conferences ==
First	Last	NCAA Division	Conference
1940–41	1977–78	Division II	Mason–Dixon
1978–79	1982–83	Division II	D-II Independent
1983–84	1987–88	Division II	Mason–Dixon
1988–89		Division I	D-I Independent
1989–90	2021–22	Division I	Northeast
2022–23	Present	Division I	MAAC

== Teams ==
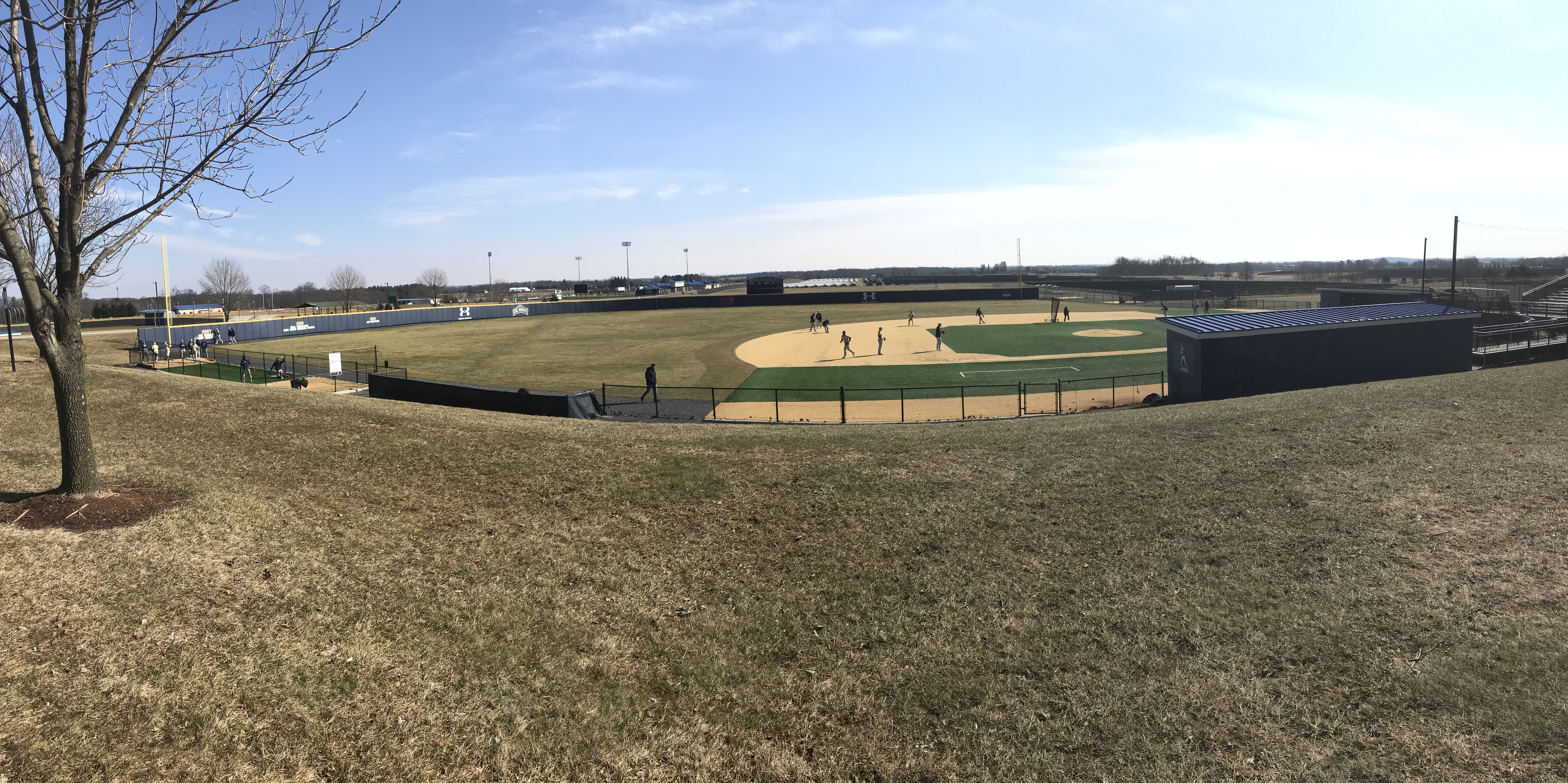
Straw Family Stadium, baseball venue

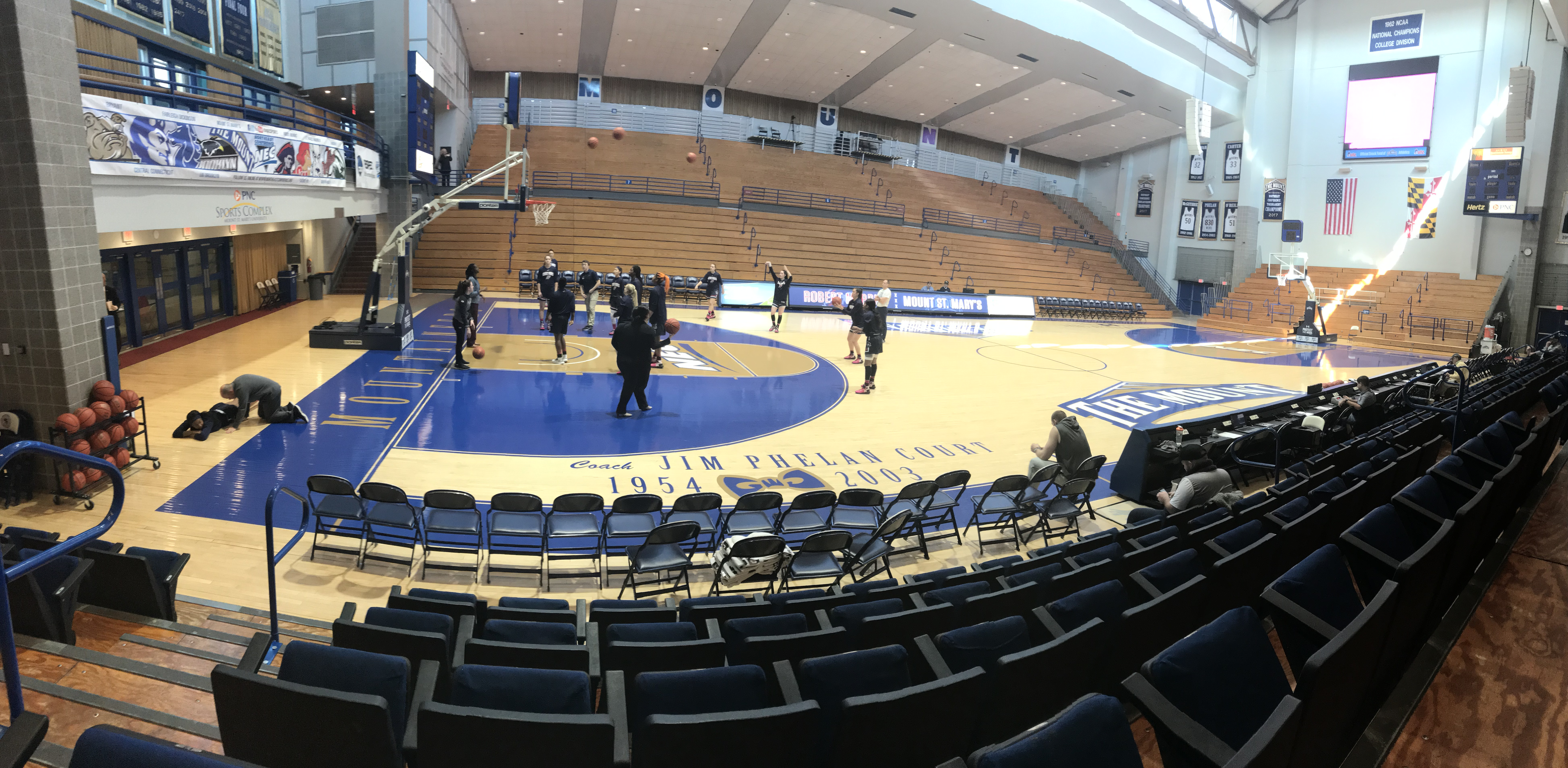
Knott Arena, basketball venue

Sport	Head coach	Venue
Baseball	Frank Leoni	E.T. Straw Family Stadium
Men's basketball	Donny Lind	Knott Arena
Women's basketball	Bryan Whitten	Knott Arena
Women's bowling	Kenneth DeGraaf	
Men's cross country	Jay Phillips	Morgan Track
Women's cross country	Jay Phillips	Morgan Track
Women's flag football	Sandi James	TBA
Men's golf	Kevin Farrell	
Women's golf	Kevin Farrell	
Men's lacrosse	Chris Ryan	Waldron Family Stadium
Women's lacrosse	Lauren Schwarzmann	Waldron Family Stadium
Women's rugby	Farrah Douglas	
Men's soccer	Bryan Cunningham	Waldron Family Stadium
Women's soccer	Liis Abbott	Waldron Family Stadium
Softball	Anna Nagro	Our Lady of the Meadows Field
Men's swimming & diving	Neil Yost	Mount St. Mary's Swimming Pool
Women's swimming & diving	Neil Yost	Mount St. Mary's Swimming Pool
Men's tennis	Samantha Pinchoff	Mount St. Mary's Tennis Courts
Women's tennis	Samantha Pinchoff	Mount St. Mary's Tennis Courts
Men's indoor track & field	Jay Phillips	Morgan Track
Women's indoor track & field	Jay Phillips	Morgan Track
Men's outdoor track & field	Jay Phillips	Morgan Track
Women's outdoor track & field	Jay Phillips	Morgan Track

=== Men's basketball ===
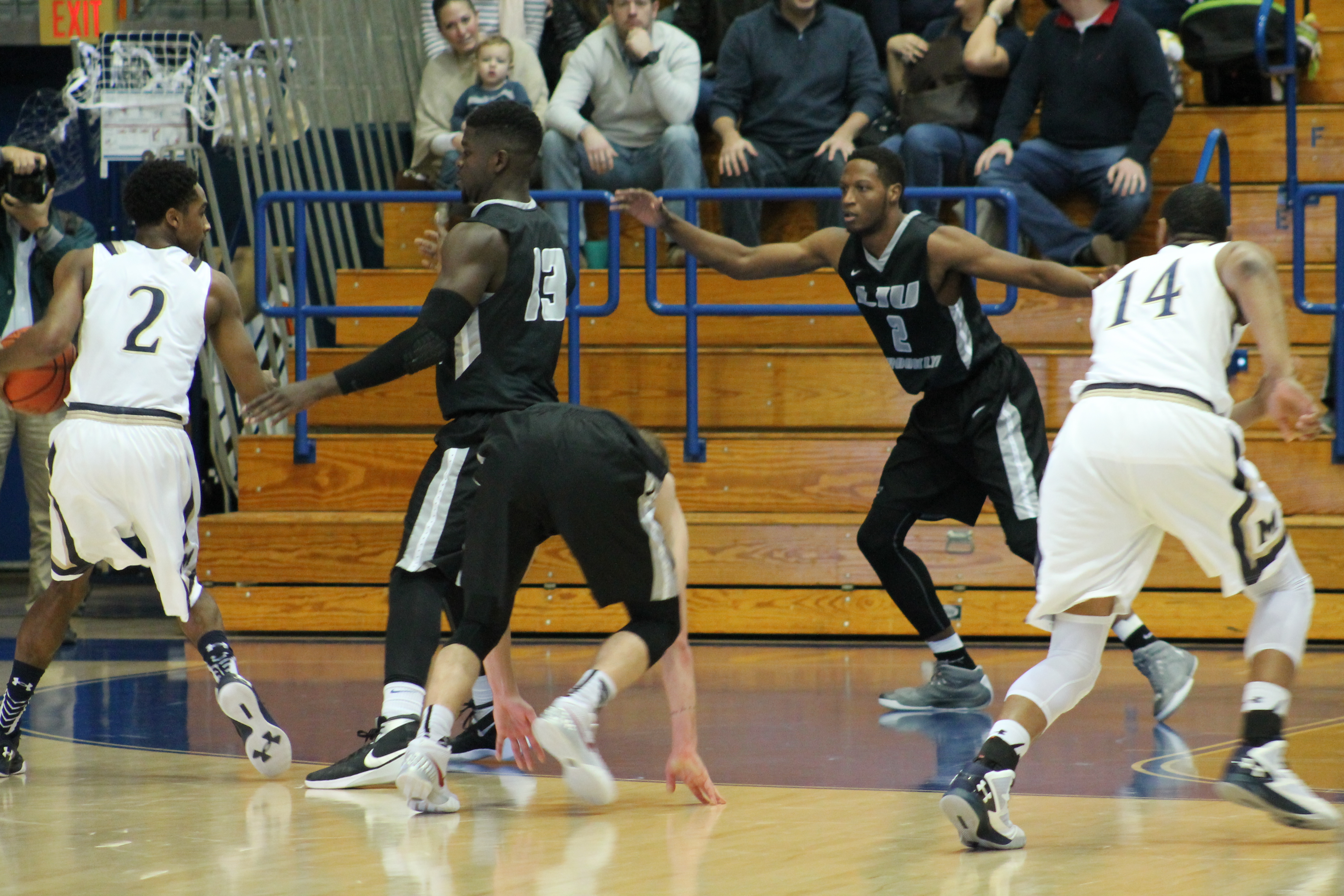
Mount (in white) v Brooklyn game in 2016

Mount men's basketball won the 1962 NCAA College Division basketball tournament (the predecessor to the modern Division II tournament) by defeating the Sacramento State Hornets, 58–57, and earned their first NCAA Division I men's basketball tournament win against the Coppin State Eagles in 2008.

=== Men's lacrosse ===
The Mountaineers earned regular-season conference titles in 1999, 2001, 2010, 2011, 2019, and 2023, won conference tournament championships in 2001, 2003, 2010, and 2011, and faced the University of Virginia in their 2003 and 2010 NCAA Division I men's lacrosse tournament appearances.

=== Men's soccer ===
The Mount sponsored men's soccer from 1953 to 2012, participating in the NEC from 1988 to 2012. The sport was discontinued following the 2012 season for financial reasons but resumed in 2018.

== Facilities ==
Sports facilities include E.T. Straw Family Stadium, Knott Arena, Morgan Track, Waldron Family Stadium, Our Lady of the Meadows Field, a swimming pool, and tennis courts.

== Olympians ==
Olympics	Athlete	Sport	Event	Nation.	Medal
1984	Dave Lishebo	Track and Field	400 meters	Zambia	
1984	Bill Motti	Track and Field	Decathlon	France	
1984	Fred Owusu	Track and Field	400 meters	Ghana	
1984	Trond Skramstad	Track and Field	Decathlon	Norway	
1984, 1988	Charles Cheruiyot	Track and Field	5000 meters	Kenya	
1984, 1988	Kip Cheruiyot	Track and Field	1500 meters	Kenya	
1988	Carlos O'Connell	Track and Field	Decathlon	Ireland	
1988	Peter Rono	Track and Field	1500 meters	Kenya	Gold
1988	Georg Werthner	Track and Field	Decathlon	Austria	
1992	Bill Motti	Track and Field	Decathlon	France	
1996	Cliff Wong	Track and Field	4 × 400 meters relay	Guyana	
2008	Dita Krumberga	Women's Basketball	Tournament Play	Latvia	
