= Mason–Dixon Conference =

Defunct NCAA athletic conference

- Classification: NCAA Division II
- Founded: 1936
- Folded: 1978
- Sports fielded: Baseball, basketball, football, golf, soccer, track, tennis, wrestling
- No. of teams: 17
- Region: South Atlantic states

The Mason–Dixon Conference was an NCAA Division II (former NCAA College Division) athletics conference, formed in 1936 and disbanded in October 1978. A track championship bearing the conference's name continued for several years after the demise of the all-sports league. Its members were predominantly from states bordering the eponymous Mason–Dixon line. A similarly named Mason-Dixon Athletic Conference began play in Division II men's basketball in 1983–84 with three of the previous members (Mount St. Mary's University, Randolph–Macon College, and the University of Maryland, Baltimore County) plus Longwood University, Liberty University and the University of Pittsburgh at Johnstown.

Originally for track and field only, it was established in 1936 by Waldo Hamilton and Dorsey Griffith who both coached the sport at Johns Hopkins University and The Catholic University of America respectively. Its main purpose was to provide an annual championship meet for smaller colleges. The conference began with nine member schools. Besides the institutions for which the founders represented, the others were American University, Gallaudet University, Randolph–Macon College, University of Baltimore, University of Delaware, Washington College and Western Maryland College. Within four years it began to include other sports. Men's basketball was added in 1940. The Mason–Dixon Conference sought to "solidify small college athletics and to stimulate a competitive spirit."

== Member schools ==
=== Final members ===
Institution	Location	Founded	Affiliation	Enrollment	Nickname	Joined (Note: Represents the calendar year when fall sports competition begins.)	Left (Note: Represents the calendar year when spring sports competition ends.)	Current conference
University of Baltimore	Baltimore, Maryland	1925	Public	2,825	Super Bees	1936	1978	N/A (Note: Baltimore discontinued its athletics program after the 1982–83 school year.)
Frostburg State College (Note: Currently known as Frostburg State University since 1987.)	Frostburg, Maryland	1898	Public	6,133	Bobcats	1977	1978	Mountain East (MEC)
George Mason University	Fairfax, Virginia	1957	Public	35,047	Patriots	1972	1978	Atlantic 10 (A10) (Note: Currently an NCAA Division I athletic conference.)
Mount St. Mary's University	Emmitsburg, Maryland	1808	Catholic	1,889	Mountaineers	1940	1978	Metro Atlantic (MAAC)
Towson State University (Note: Currently known as Towson University since 1997.)	Towson, Maryland	1866	Public	22,923	Tigers	1939	1978	Coastal (CAA)
University of Maryland–Baltimore County	Catonsville, Maryland	1966	Public	13,767	Retrievers	1972	1978	America East (AmEast)

=== Other members ===
Institution	Location	Founded	Affiliation	Enrollment	Nickname	Joined (Note: Represents the calendar year when fall sports competition begins.)	Left (Note: Represents the calendar year when spring sports competition ends.)	Current conference
American University	Washington, D.C.	1893	United; Methodist	6,028	Eagles	1936	1966	Patriot (Note: Currently an NCAA Division I athletic conference.)
Bridgewater College	Bridgewater, Virginia	1880	Church of the Brethren	1,690	Bridgewater	1941	1976	Old Dominion (ODAC) (Note: Currently an NCAA Division III athletic conference.)
The Catholic University of America	Washington, D.C.	1887	Pontifical	5,771	Cardinals	1936	1976	Landmark
University of Delaware	Newark, Delaware	1743	Public	23,281	Fightin'; Blue Hens	1936	1947	Conf. USA (CUSA)
Emory and Henry College (Note: Currently known as Emory and Henry University since 2024.)	Emory, Virginia	1836	United; Methodist	1,000	Wasps	1975	1976	South Atlantic (SAC)
Gallaudet University	Washington, D.C.	1864	Quasigovernmental	1,740	Bison	1936	1974	United East
Hampden–Sydney College	Hampden Sydney, Virginia	1775	Presbyterian	1,120	Tigers	1947	1976	Old Dominion (ODAC)
Johns Hopkins University	Baltimore, Maryland	1876	Nonsectarian	20,174	Blue Jays	1936	1974	Centennial
Loyola College Maryland (Note: Currently known as Loyola University Maryland since 2009.)	Baltimore, Maryland	1852	Catholic (Jesuit)	4,068	Greyhounds	1940	1977	Patriot
Lynchburg College (Note: Currently known as the University of Lynchburg since 2018.)	Lynchburg, Virginia	1903	Disciples of Christ	2,500	Hornets	1948	1969	Old Dominion (ODAC)
Old Dominion University	Norfolk, Virginia	1930	Public	24,176	Monarchs & Lady Monarchs	1962	1969	Sun Belt (SBC)
Randolph–Macon College	Ashland, Virginia	1830	United; Methodist	1,146	Yellow Jackets	1936	1975	Old Dominion (ODAC)
Roanoke College	Salem, Virginia	1842	Private	2,000	Maroons	1948	1976	Old Dominion (ODAC)
Salisbury State College (Note: Currently known as Salisbury University since 2001.)	Salisbury, Maryland	1925	Public	7,383	Sea Gulls	1974	1977	Coast to Coast (C2C)
St. John's College of Maryland	Annapolis, Maryland	1784	Nonsectarian	775	—	1936	—	N/A
Shepherd University	Shepherdstown, West Virginia	1871	Public	3,159	Rams	1964	1968	Pennsylvania (PSAC)
Washington and Lee University	Lexington, Virginia	1749	Nonsectarian	2,200	Generals	1975	1976	Old Dominion (ODAC)
Washington College	Chestertown, Maryland	1782	Nonsectarian	1,479	Shoremen & Shorewomen	1936	1972	Centennial
Western Maryland College (Note: Currently known as McDaniel College since 2002.)	Westminster, Maryland	1867	Nonsectarian	1,559	Green Terror	1936	1974	Centennial

=== Membership timeline ===
Full member (all sports) Full member (non-football) Associate member (football) Associate member (sport)

== Champions by sport ==
=== Men's basketball ===
- 1941 – Western Maryland
- 1942 – Loyola
- 1943 – Gallaudet
- 1944 – Mount Saint Mary's
- 1945 – American
- 1946 – American
- 1947 – Loyola
- 1948 – Loyola
- 1949 – Loyola
- 1950 – American
- 1951 – American
- 1952 – Baltimore
- 1953 – Loyola
- 1954 – Mount Saint Mary's
- 1955 – Mount Saint Mary's
- 1956 – Mount Saint Mary's
- 1957 – Mount Saint Mary's
- 1958 – American
- 1959 – American
- 1960 – American and Mount Saint Mary's
- 1961 – Catholic and Mount Saint Mary's
- 1962 – Mount Saint Mary's
- 1963 – Mount Saint Mary's
- 1964 – Catholic
- 1965 – Randolph–Macon
- 1966 – Randolph–Macon
- 1967 – Mount Saint Mary's
- 1968 – Roanoke
- 1969 – Old Dominion
- 1970 – Roanoke
- 1971 – Loyola
- 1972 – Roanoke
- 1973 – Loyola
- 1974 – Randolph–Macon
- 1975 – Randolph–Macon
- 1976 – Baltimore
- 1977 – Towson State
- 1978 – Towson State

=== Football ===
- 1946 – Delaware
- 1947 – Randolph–Macon
- 1948 – Johns Hopkins
- 1949 – Western Maryland
- 1950 – Randolph–Macon
- 1951 – Western Maryland
- 1952 – Randolph–Macon
- 1953 – Hampden–Sydney
- 1954 – Hampden–Sydney
- 1955 – Randolph–Macon
- 1956 – Johns Hopkins
- 1957 – Hampden–Sydney
- 1958 – Randolph–Macon
- 1959 – Johns Hopkins
- 1960 – Randolph–Macon and Western Maryland
- 1961 – Western Maryland
- 1962 – Western Maryland
- 1963 – Western Maryland
- 1964 – Hampden–Sydney
- 1965 – Randolph–Macon
- 1966 – Hampden–Sydney
- 1967 – Randolph–Macon
- 1968 – Randolph–Macon
- 1969 – Randolph–Macon
- 1970 – Hampden–Sydney
- 1971 – Hampden–Sydney
- 1972 – Hampden–Sydney
- 1973 – Hampden–Sydney
- 1974 – Towson State

== See also ==
- List of defunct college football conferences
- Chesapeake Conference
- Old Dominion Athletic Conference (ODAC)
