= Deaths in February 1989 =

The following is a list of notable deaths in February 1989.

Entries for each day are listed alphabetically by surname. A typical entry lists information in the following sequence:

- Name, age, country of citizenship at birth, subsequent country of citizenship (if applicable), reason for notability, cause of death (if known), and reference.

== February 1989 ==
=== 1 ===
- Hubert Ausböck, 81, German Olympic boxer (1928).
- Everett Bacon, 98, American college football player (Wesleyan Cardinals).
- Lillian Boyer, 88, American wing walker.
- James Drake, 81, British civil engineer, pioneer of the national motorway network.
- Blaze Foley, 39, American country music singer-songwriter, poet and artist, shot.
- Elaine de Kooning, 70, American artist.
- Grace Hayes, 93, American actress, singer, vaudeville entertainer and nightclub owner.
- J.C. Hoel, 84, American motorcycle racer, and founder of the Sturgis Motorcycle Rally.
- Kenneth Morris, 71, American composer of gospel music.
- Erik Persson, 79, Swedish international footballer and Olympian (1936).
- John Tootoosis, 89, Canadian First Nations leader.

=== 2 ===
- Yuri Bogatyryov, 41, Soviet actor (At Home Among Strangers), medication clash related to heart attack.
- Marie Poland Fish, 88, American oceanographer and marine biologist.
- Étienne Guibel, 83, French Olympic field hockey player (1936).
- Vladimír Lulek, 35, Czech family murderer, executed.
- Ondrej Nepela, 38, Slovak figure skater and Olympic gold medalist (1964, 1968, 1972), lymph node cancer.
- Arnold Nordmeyer, 87, New Zealand politician, Leader of the Opposition.
- Nuno Oliveira, 63, Portuguese equestrian, horse trainer and dressage instructor.
- Walter M. Scott, 82, American set decorator (The Sound of Music, Butch Cassidy and the Sundance Kid).
- Marie Syrkin, 89, American writer and Zionist activist.

=== 3 ===
- Dick Bass, 82, American MLB player (Washington Senators).
- John Cassavetes, 59, Greek-American actor (Johnny Staccato, The Dirty Dozen), film director, and screenwriter, cirrhosis of the liver.
- Glenna Collett-Vare, 85, American amateur golfer, inducted into World Golf Hall of Fame.
- John Davis, 77, British RAF officer.
- Betty Farrington, 90, American actress.
- Joan Grant, 81, English writer of historical novels (Winged Pharaoh).
- Harry Gray, 72, Australian rules footballer.
- Frank Hursley, 86, half of American husband-and-wife television screenwriting duo Frank and Doris Hursley (General Hospital).
- Nina Kirsanova, 91, Russian-born Yugoslav ballet dancer.
- Ebbe Langberg, 55, Danish actor and film director.
- John McCauley, 89, Australian Air Force senior commander, Chief of Air Force, stroke.
- Louis H. Narcisse, 67, American religious leader, founder of Mt. Zion Spiritual Church, heart attack.
- Lionel Newman, 73, American conductor, pianist and composer (Academy Award for Best Original Score for Hello, Dolly!), cardiac arrest.
- Kim Sung-jun, 35, South Korean boxer (WBC light flyweight champion), suicide by jumping.

=== 4 ===
- Kenneth C. "Jethro" Burns, 68, American mandolinist, half of comedy duo Homer and Jethro, prostate cancer.
- Medford Bryan Evans, 81, college professor and Conservative political activist.
- Thorkild Hansen, 62, Danish novelist (Coast of Slaves, Ships of Slaves, Islands of Slaves).
- Trevor Lucas, 45, Australian folk singer (Fotheringay), heart attack.
- Grandizo Munis, 76, Spanish Trotskyist politician.
- Ham Seok-heon, 87, Korean Quaker.
- Ferris Webster, 76, American film editor (The Manchurian Candidate, The Great Escape).

=== 5 ===
- André Cheuva, 80, French international footballer and manager (Lille OSC).
- Roy Chicago, Nigerian musician and band leader.
- Percy Hoskins, 84, British crime reporter (Daily Express).
- Emrys James, 60, Welsh Shakespearean actor.
- Rajinder Kaur, 57, Indian journalist and politician, shot by terrorists.
- Joe Morrison, 51, American NFL footballer and coach (New York Giants), congestive heart failure.
- Killer Joe Piro, 67, American dance instructor, kidney disease.
- Joe Raposo, 51, American composer, singer and pianist (Sesame Street theme, Bein' Green), non-Hodgkin lymphoma.
- Hal Wilder, 95, American NFL player (St. Louis All-Stars).

=== 6 ===
- Suri Bhagavantam, 79, Indian scientist, vice chancellor of Osmania University, director of Indian Institute of Science.
- Sushil Bose, 77, Indian cricketer.
- Joseph L. Carrigg, 87, American politician, member of the United States House of Representatives (1951-1959).
- André Cayatte, 80, French filmmaker (Justice Is Done, We Are All Murderers, To Die of Love).
- Ron Field, 55, American choreographer and dancer (Cabaret), brain lesions.
- Chris Gueffroy, 20, East German, last to be killed by use of firearms at the Berlin Wall.
- Netty Herawaty, 59, Indonesian actress (Rodrigo de Villa, After the Curfew).
- Antoni Łaciak, 49, Polish Olympic ski jumper (1964).
- Filiberto Menna, 62, Italian art critic and art theorist.
- Undine Smith Moore, 84, American composer and professor of music (Scenes from the Life of a Martyr), stroke.
- Otto Schulmann, 86, German-born conductor and vocal teacher.
- King Tubby, 48, Jamaican sound engineer, shot.
- Barbara W. Tuchman, 77, American historian and author (The Guns of August, Stilwell and the American Experience in China), stroke.

=== 7 ===
- Eric Jay, 81, British Anglican priest.
- Albert Branson Maris, 95, American judge.
- Adolf Martignoni, 79, Swiss Olympic ice hockey player (1936).
- James T. Patterson, 80, American politician, member of the United States House of Representatives (1947-1959).
- Philip Pratt, 64, American district judge (United States District Court for the Eastern District of Michigan).
- Giuseppe Puca, 33, Italian criminal, boss of Nuova Camorra Organizzata, murdered after shootout.
- Sixto Rovina, 28, Netherlands Antilles international footballer, heart attack during game.
- Gilbert Simondon, 64, French philosopher.
- William Campbell Steere, 81, American botanist, expert on bryophytes, director of New York Botanical Garden.
- Simon Virsaladze, 80, Georgian ballet, film and opera designer.
- Prince Wilhelm Victor of Prussia, 69, German nobleman and diplomat.

=== 8 ===
- Matt Bross, 85, American NFL player (Green Bay Packers).
- John Coward, 81, British Olympic ice hockey player (1936).
- Cyril Luckham, 81, English film, television and theatre actor (Doctor Who, Some Mothers Do 'Ave 'Em).
- Begum Khurshid Mirza, 70, Pakistani television and film actress.
- Webster B. Todd, 89, American Chairman of New Jersey Republican State Committee, heart attack.

=== 9 ===
- Ken Adachi, 59–60, Canadian writer and literary critic (Toronto Star).
- Bill Dalley, 87, New Zealand rugby union player (Canterbury, All Blacks).
- Oliver C. Dawson, 78, American athlete (John Carroll Blue Streaks) and sports coach (South Carolina State Bulldogs).
- Osamu Tezuka, 60, Japanese artist and animator (Astro Boy, Kimba the White Lion), stomach cancer.

=== 10 ===
- Darnley Alexander, 69, Nigerian jurist, Chief Justice of Nigeria.
- Irving Brown, 77, American trade unionist (Presidential Medal of Freedom).
- Agustín Ramos Calero, 69, decorated Puerto Rican soldier in the U.S. Army.
- Cosmo Crawley, 84, English cricketer, rackets and real tennis player.
- Wayne Hays, 77, American politician, member of the U.S. House of Representatives (1949-1976), heart attack.
- Grady Higginbotham, 96, American sports player and coach.
- James Hunter III, 72, American circuit judge (United States Court of Appeals for the Third Circuit).
- Panini Ilangakoon, 69, Sri Lankan politician, Member of Parliament.
- Dan Kelly, 52, Canadian-American sportscaster, lung cancer.
- Emily Kimbrough, 89, American author and journalist (Our Hearts Were Young and Gay).
- Herbert Ryman, 78, American artist and Disney Imagineer (Sleeping Beauty Castle), cancer.
- Josef Schneeberger, 69, Austrian Olympic cross-country skier (1952 1956).

=== 11 ===
- Charles L. Bolte, 93, United States Army general, vice Chief of Staff of the United States Army, stroke.
- T. E. B. Clarke, 81, British screenwriter (The Lavender Hill Mob).
- Leon Festinger, 69, American social psychologist (cognitive dissonance, social comparison theory), cancer.
- Roland Gross, 80, American film editor and television editor (None but the Lonely Heart).
- George O'Hanlon, 76, American actor, comedian and writer (The Jetsons), stroke.
- André Rolet, 87, French Olympic weightlifter (1924).
- Cecil C. Steiner, 92, American dentist (Steiner method of analysis).
- Shakhbut bin Sultan Al Nahyan, 83, ruler of Abu Dhabi.
- Katharine Lane Weems, 89, American sculptor (Dolphins of the Sea, Lotta Fountain).

=== 12 ===
- Thomas Bernhard, 58, Austrian novelist and playwright (Correction, Extinction), heart attack.
- Eduard Braesecke, 83, German Olympic long-distance runner (1936).
- Jorge Romero Brest, 83, Argentinian art critic.
- Attilio Dottesio, 79, Italian film actor and singer.
- Pat Finucane, 39, Irish lawyer, murdered.
- Gordon Kramer, 67, Australian rules footballer.
- Euel Moore, 80, American MLB player (Philadelphia Phillies, New York Giants).
- Pandit Narendra Sharma, 75, Indian writer and poet (Satyam Shivam Sundaram theme).
- Bill Speer, 46, Canadian NHL ice hockey player (Boston Bruins), snowmobile accident.

=== 13 ===
- Ernestine Barrier, 80, American stage, film and television actress (Project Moonbase).
- Hal Broda, 83, American NFL player (Cleveland Bulldogs).
- Claude Dupuy, 87, French Roman Catholic archbishop.
- Princess Eugénie of Greece and Denmark, 79, member of the Greek Royal family.
- Thorbjørn Frydenlund, 96, Norwegian Olympic wrestler (1912).
- Dud Harris, 85, American NFL player (Portsmouth Spartans).
- Hip Linkchain, 52, American blues guitarist, singer and songwriter (Change My Blues, That Will Never Do), mesothelioma cancer.
- Aubrey Martyn, 82, Australian rules footballer.
- Aubrey Menen, 76, British author and theatre critic.
- Richard Roud, 59, American writer on film, co-founder of the New York Film Festival.
- Geoff Selby, 23, Australian rugby league footballer (Illawarra Steelers, St. George Dragons), car accident.
- Dave Tarras, appr. 94, Ukrainian-American clarinetist and bandleader, pneumonia.

=== 14 ===
- James Bond, 89, American ornithologist, curator of the Academy of Natural Sciences of Philadelphia (Birds of the West Indies).
- Vincent Crane, 45, English keyboardist (The Crazy World of Arthur Brown, Atomic Rooster), suicide by drug overdose.
- Krishnarao Dhulap, 68, leader of Peasants and Workers Party of India.
- Duncan Gregg, 78, American Olympic rower (1932).
- Hilario, 83, Spanish footballer.
- Mike Riordan, 82, American NFL player (Staten Island Stapletons).
- Vincent Žuk-Hryškievič, 86, Belarusian politician, president of the government-in-exile of the Belarusian Democratic Republic.

=== 15 ===
- Hüseyin Akbaş, 56, Turkish wrestler and dual Olympic medalist (1956, 1960, 1964).
- Jorge de Cárdenas, 55, Cuban Olympic sailor (1952, 1956, 1960).
- Sita Devi, 71, Indian Princess Consort of Vuyyur, the "Indian Wallis Simpson".
- Daniel Fox, 61, American polymer chemist (LEXAN).
- Robert Kerns, 55, American baritone (Vienna State Opera).
- Lee E. McMahon, 57, American computer scientist (sed stream editor).
- Sjafruddin Prawiranegara, 77, Indonesian statesman and economist, Prime Minister of Indonesia, heart attack.
- Antonio Garzoni Provenzani, 82, Italian Olympic rower (1932).
- Benito Totti, 74, Italian Olympic boxer (1936).
- Aleksandr Travin, 51, Soviet Russian Olympic basketball player (1964).
- Sabo Bakin Zuwo, 54, Nigerian politician, Governor of Kano State.

=== 16 ===
- Andy Black, 72, Scottish international footballer (Manchester City, Scotland).
- Ida Ehre, 88, Austrian-German actor, theatre director and manager, heart attack.
- Arne Jørgensen, 91, Danish Olympic gymnast (1920).
- David Kerr, 65, Australian cricketer.
- Mirza Abdul Halim, 23, Singaporean police constable, murdered.
- Paco Lagerstrom, 74, Swedish-American applied mathematician and aeronautical engineer (Caltech).
- Paweł Świętek, 64, Polish Olympic gymnast (1952).

=== 17 ===
- Rudolf Brill, 89, German chemist.
- Francesco Buccitelli, 66, Italian artist, mayor of Pacentro.
- Per Dahl, 72, Norwegian Olympic ice hockey player (1952).
- Ian Fraser, 78, British judge, member of the House of Lords, car accident.
- R. B. Frost, 81, American college sports coach.
- Lefty Gomez, 80, American Major League baseball player (New York Yankees), congestive heart failure.
- Fernando Irayzoz, 64, Spanish Olympic modern pentathlete (1960).
- Guy Laroche, 67, French fashion designer.
- Marguerite Roberts, 83, American screenwriter, blacklisted for not cooperating with House Un-American Activities Committee, arteriosclerosis.
- Hanne Sobek, 88, German international footballer (Hertha BSC, Germany).
- Si Titus, 70, American NFL player (Brooklyn Dodgers, Pittsburgh Steelers).
- Jan Vreede, 89, Dutch Olympic sailor (1924).

=== 18 ===
- John Bailey, 76, British screen and TV actor (The Forsyte Saga).
- Mildred Burke, 73, American professional wrestler, women's world champion, stroke.
- Dixie Deans, 75, Royal Air Force sergeant, Second World War bomber pilot.
- Dina Halpern, 79, Polish-born American actress.
- Kathleen Hite, 71, American writer for radio and television (Gunsmoke, The Waltons).

=== 19 ===
- Edward Beetham, 74, British colonial official, Resident Commissioner in Swaziland, Governor of Trinidad and Tobago.
- Eric F. Goldman, 72, American historian, presidential advisor (The Open Mind).
- Sigurd Marius Johansen, 82, Norwegian politician.
- Edmund Knapp, 71, New Zealand cricketer.
- Alec Merrison, 64, British physicist, vice-chancellor of University of Bristol, director of Lloyds Bank.
- Sándor Pázmándy, 76, Hungarian footballer.
- Jack de Sequeira, 73, Indian politician, Leader of the Opposition of the Goa, Daman and Diu Legislative Assembly.
- Franjo Škrinjar, 68, Croatian Olympic long-distance runner (1960).
- Rosa Slade Gragg, 84, American activist and politician.

=== 20 ===
- Stuart Black, 81, New Zealand Olympic sprinter (1932).
- Julio César Chaves, 81, Paraguayan historian.
- Percy Chen, 88, Trinidad-born Chinese lawyer, founding member of Hong Kong Bar Association.
- Erika Köth, 63, German operatic soprano.
- Anthony Leeds, 64, American anthropologist, heart attack.
- Betty Mars, 44, French singer and actress, Eurovision song contestant, suicide by jumping.
- Aleksandr Medvedkin, 88, Soviet film director (Happiness).
- Manuel Rosas, 76, Mexican international footballer (Atlante F.C., Mexico).
- Clarke Scholtz, 77, South African Olympic middle-distance runner (1936).
- Alex Thépot, 82, French footballer and Olympian (1928).
- Adolfo Yedro, 66, Argentine Olympic rower (1948).

=== 21 ===
- Valentín Beperet, 62, Chilean footballer.
- Harry Clarke, 83, Australian rules footballer.
- Paul Davis, 63, American NFL player (Pittsburgh Steelers).
- Robert Dorning, 75, English musician, ballet dancer and actor, diabetes.
- Sándor Márai, 88, Hungarian writer, poet and journalist (Embers).
- Chet Ross, 71, American MLB player (Boston Bees/Braves).
- Otar Taktakishvili, 64, Georgian composer and conductor (Sonata for Flute and Piano, Mindia).
- Moshe Unna, 86, Israeli politician, member of the Knesset (1949-1969).

=== 22 ===
- Roxanne Arlen, 58, American film and stage actress.
- Harry Brand, 93, American press agent, credited with the fame of Shirley Temple, Betty Grable and Marilyn Monroe, heart attack.
- Raymond Gower, 72, British politician, member of the House of Commons, heart attack.
- Abel Wolman, 96, American engineer, pioneer in sanitary engineering.
- Joan Woodbury, 73, American actress (The Eagle's Brood, Brenda Starr, Reporter).

=== 23 ===
- David Mowbray Balme, 76, British professor, Principal of the University College of the Gold Coast.
- Hans Hellmut Kirst, 74, German novelist (Die Nacht der Generale).
- Ramito, 73, Puerto Rican composer (Qué Bonita Bandera), suicide by gunshot.
- Tsepon W. D. Shakabpa, 82, Tibetan nobleman and statesman, Finance Minister of Tibet, stomach cancer.
- Roy Tyner, 55, American NASCAR Grand National driver, gunshot.

=== 24 ===
- Sparky Adams, 94, American Major League baseball player (Chicago Cubs, St. Louis Cardinals).
- Paul M. Bator, 59, Hungarian-born American legal scholar and Supreme Court advocate, Deputy Solicitor General of the United States.
- Teddy Brannon, 72, American jazz and blues pianist.
- Norris Cotton, 88, American politician, US representative (1947-1954) and senator (1954-1974, 1975).
- Joe Harvey, 70, English footballer and manager (Newcastle United, Bradford City).
- Ben Kish, 71, American NFL player (Brooklyn Dodgers, Steagles, Philadelphia Eagles).
- Margo Lion, 89, Ottoman-French singer and actress (Threepenny Opera).
- Paulaseer, 68, Indian preacher, 'faith healer'.
- Mallica Reynolds, 78, Jamaican artist and religious leader (Shining the Spring).
- William Thayer Tutt, 76, American ice hockey and figure skating executive.

=== 25 ===
- Paula Banholzer, 87, German love interest of Bertolt Brecht.
- Angna Enters, 91, American dancer, mime, painter and writer (Lost Angel, Tenth Avenue Angel).
- Robert Foulk, 80, American television and film actor (Lassie).
- Wilhelm Hölter, 84, German painter.
- Bob Ivory, 65, American NFL player (Detroit Lions).

=== 26 ===
- Roy Eldridge, 78, American jazz trumpeter.
- Joseph Fenton, appr. 46, Northern Ireland estate agent, killed by Provisional Irish Republican Army (body found on this date).
- Reunald Jones, 78, American jazz trumpeter.
- Mouloud Mammeri, 71, Algerian writer, anthropologist and linguist, car accident.
- Éloi Meulenberg, 76, Belgian cyclist.
- Clayton Robson, 87, Indian-born English first-class cricketer.

=== 27 ===
- Paul Oswald Ahnert, 91, German astronomer (Kalender für Sternfreunde).
- Shiba P. Chatterjee, 86, Indian Professor of Geography.
- Mauricio Garcés, 62, Mexican actor and comedian (Fray Don Juan, Modisto de señoras).
- Brian Hall, 59, English cricketer.
- Kim Hyun-chul, 87, Korean independence activist and politician, Prime Minister of South Korea.
- Göran Larsson, 56, Swedish Olympic swimmer (1952).
- Konrad Lorenz, 85, Austrian zoologist and author (Man Meets Dog), Nobel laureate in Physiology or Medicine, Nazi supporter.
- Sayuti Melik, 80, Indonesian political agitant (Proclamation of Indonesian Independence).
- Gilberto Molina, 52, Colombian emerald magnate and drug trafficker (Medellín cartel), murdered.
- Skippy Scheib, 85, American NFL player (Brooklyn Dodgers).
- Joe Silver, 66, American stage, television, film and radio actor, heart attack.

=== 28 ===
- Karl Anderson, 88, American Olympic hurdler (1924).
- Richard Armour, 82, American poet and author.
- Bernard Beryl Brodie, 81, English-born American biochemical and neurochemical pharmacology scientist.
- Aurélio Buarque de Holanda Ferreira, 78, Brazilian lexicographer, translator and writer (Aurélio Dictionary).
- Hermann Burger, 46, Swiss poet and novelist (Die Wasserfallfinsternis von Badgastein), suicide.
- Josef Epp, 68, Austrian Olympic footballer (1948).
- Everett E. Hatcher, 46, American Special Agent of the Drug Enforcement Administration, shot during undercover operation.
- Douglas Kendrew, 79, British army general and rugby union player (Leicester, England), Governor of Western Australia.
- Tirumalai Krishnamacharya, 100, Indian yoga teacher.
- Alton C. Parker, 81, Canadian police officer, first black Canadian detective.
- Pak Se-yong, 86, North Korean poet and politician (Aegukka – North Korean national anthem).
