= Rod Anfenson =

American football, basketball, and track coach (1929–2001)

Biographical details
- Born: June 29, 1929
- Died: April 13, 2001 (aged 71); Cold Spring, Minnesota, U.S.

Playing career

Football
- 1950–1953: Bemidji State

Basketball
- c. 1953: Bemidji State

Coaching career (HC unless noted)

Football
- 1954–1957: Mora HS (MN)
- 1958–1961: St. Cloud State (assistant)
- 1965–1971: St. Cloud State

Basketball
- 1958–1962: St. Cloud State (assistant)

Track
- 1958–1962: St. Cloud State
- 1962–1965: Minneapolis Southwest HS (MN)

Administrative career (AD unless noted)
- 1972–1977: St. Cloud State

Head coaching record
- Overall: 27–32–4 (college football)

Accomplishments and honors

Championships
- Football; 2 NIC (1967, 1970)

Rodney E. Anfenson (June 29, 1929 – April 13, 2001) was an American football, basketball, and track coach. He served as the head football coach at St. Cloud State University from 1965 to 1971, compiling a record of 27–32–4.

== Head coaching record ==
=== College football ===
Year	Team	Overall	Conference	Standing	Bowl/playoffs
St. Cloud State Huskies (Northern Intercollegiate Conference) (1965–1971)
1965	St. Cloud State	2–6–1	0–5	6th	
1966	St. Cloud State	3–5–1	2–2–1	T–2nd	
1967	St. Cloud State	8–1	5–0	1st	
1968	St. Cloud State	5–3–1	3–2	T–3rd	
1969	St. Cloud State	1–7–1	1–3–1	5th	
1970	St. Cloud State	6–3	5–1	T–1st	
1971	St. Cloud State	2–7	2–4	5th	
St. Cloud State:		27–32–4	18–17–2		
Total:		27–32–4			
National championship Conference title Conference division title or championship game berth
