= Eldon Mason =

American football player and coach (1902–1990)

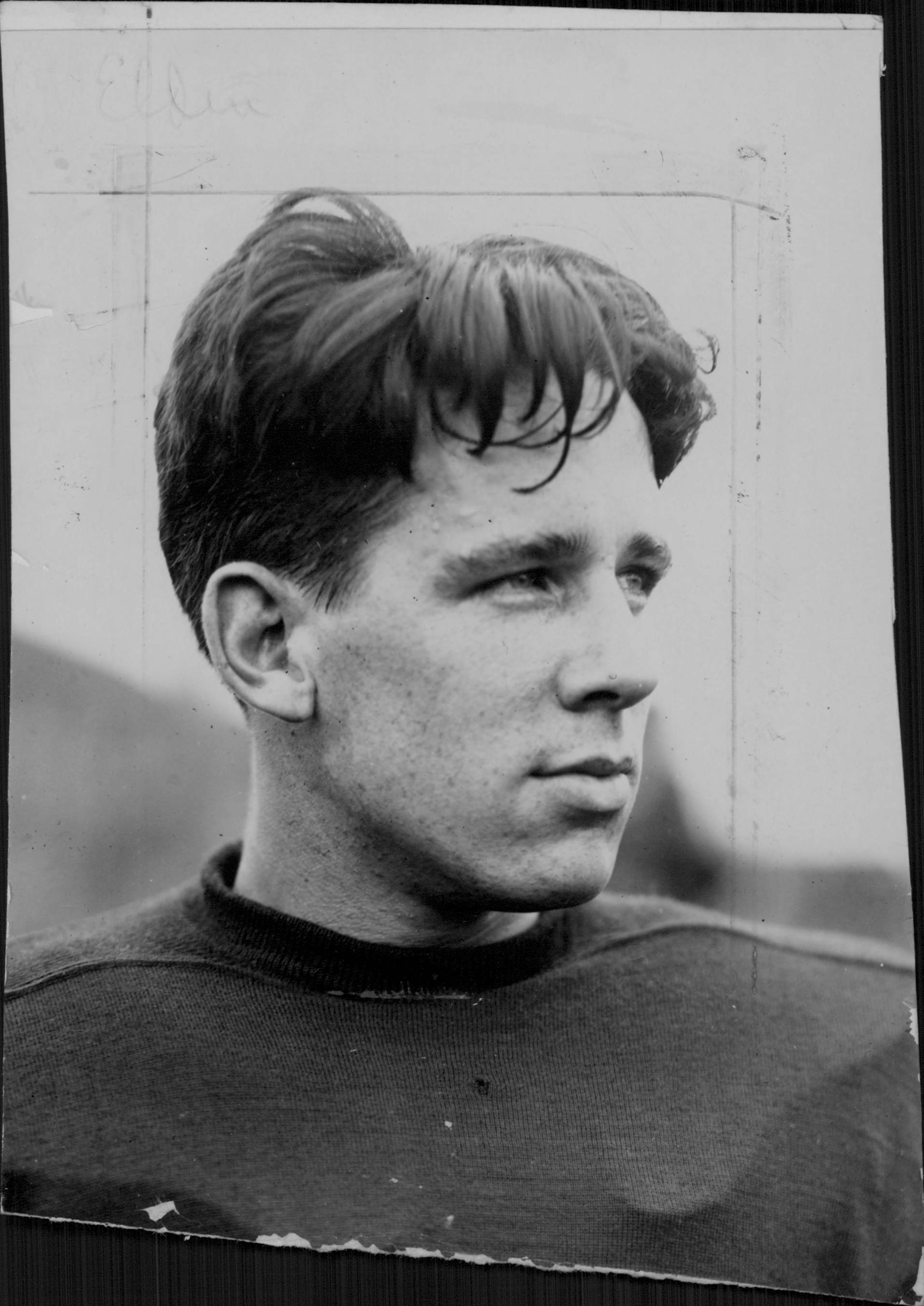

Biographical details
- Born: June 21, 1902; Minneapolis, Minnesota, U.S.
- Died: October 2, 1990 (aged 88); St. Louis, Missouri, U.S.

Playing career

Football
- 1919–1920: New Hampshire
- 1925–1927: Minnesota

Coaching career (HC unless noted)

Football
- 1928–1930: Bemidji State

Basketball
- 1928–1931: Bemidji State

Administrative career (AD unless noted)
- 1928–1931: Bemidji State

Head coaching record
- Overall: 8–9–3 (football); 17–17 (basketball)

Eldon Wellington Heywood Mason (June 21, 1902 – October 2, 1990) was an American college football player and coach. He served as the head football coach at Bemidji State Normal School—now known as Bemidji State University—in Bemidji, Minnesota from 1928 to 1930, compiling a record of 8–9–3. Mason was also the head basketball coach at Bemidji State from 1928 to 1931, tallying a mark of 17–17. Mason died of cancer on October 8, 1990, in St. Louis, Missouri.

== Head coaching record ==
=== Football ===
Year	Team	Overall	Conference	Standing	Bowl/playoffs
Bemidji State Beavers (Independent) (1928–1930)
1928	Bemidji State	3–0–3			
1929	Bemidji State	2–5			
1930	Bemidji State	3–4			
Bemidji State:		8–9–3			
Total:		8–9–3			
