= List of Bemidji State Beavers in the NFL draft =

This is a list of Bemidji State Beavers players in the NFL draft.

== Key ==
B	Back	K	Kicker	NT	Nose tackle
C	Center	LB	Linebacker	FB	Fullback
DB	Defensive back	P	Punter	HB	Halfback
DE	Defensive end	QB	Quarterback	WR	Wide receiver
DT	Defensive tackle	RB	Running back	G	Guard
E	End	T	Offensive tackle	TE	Tight end

== Selections ==
Year	Round	Pick	Player	Team	Position
1946	21	194	Dean Widseth	Chicago Bears	OT
1970	16	411	John Redebaugh	Cleveland Browns	TE
