= Joan Marshall (disambiguation) =

Joan Marshall was an actress.

Joan Marshall may also refer to:

- Joan Marshall, character in The 24 Hour Woman
- Joan Grant, née Marshall
