= Scheib =

Scheib is a surname. Notable people with the surname include:

- Carl Scheib (1927–2018), American baseball player
- Earl Scheib (1908–1992), American car-painting business founder
- Israel Scheib, birth name of Israel Eldad (1910–1996), Israeli philosopher
- Jay Scheib (born 1969), American stage director, playwright and artist
- Skippy Scheib (1903–1989), American football player
- Walter Scheib (1954–2015), American chef
