= Alton Parker =

Alton Parker may refer to:

- Alton B. Parker (1852–1926), American politician who ran for president in 1904
- Alton C. Parker (1907–1989), first black police detective in Canada
