= Julio César Chaves =

Paraguayan historian

- Born: November 27, 1907; Asunción
- Died: February 20, 1989 (aged 81); Asunción
- Known for: Historian
- Notable work: El presidente López, El supremo dictador

Julio César Chaves (November 27, 1907 – February 20, 1989) was a Paraguayan historian. He had an important role in the Chaco War as a disseminator of information and propaganda, and was also a professor, diplomat and politician.

== Early life and education ==
Chaves was born in Asunción in 1907. He pursued primary and secondary education in San José and at the National College and earned his doctorate in 1929, after defending his thesis on the Monroe Doctrine.

He belonged to the so-called "Generation 1925", along with figures such as Efraím Cardozo, Hipolito Sanchez Quell and R. Antonio Ramos. His studies on José Gaspar Rodríguez de Francia eventually became the book The Supreme Dictator.

== Career ==
During the Chaco War, Chaves worked at the "Department II", first under the command of Tomás Romero Pereira and then as chief until the end of the war. In mid-July 1934, at the request of President Eusebio Ayala and General José Félix Estigarribia, Chaves organized (as head of Department II) the Directorate Press and Propaganda (popularly known as Radio Press), presented in the form of daily bulletins, in order to raise troop morale.

He was, also after the war, a civil prosecutor in 1936, and national deputy in 1938. At that time he was an activist in the Liberal Youth Club, along with Efraím Cardozo and many other young activists, the group that launched and supported the presidential candidacy of General José Félix Estigarribia in 1939, against the wishes of the liberal old guard who wanted a civilian president.

In 1939, Chaves was sent as minister to Bolivia and then to Peru as an ambassador in 1940. From 1941, following the rise to power of General Higinio Morínigo as President after the death of Estigarribia, Chaves took exile in Buenos Aires.

He was perhaps among the most fortunate exiles of the country because Chaves began to develop part of his historiography work there.

Chaves was also president of the Academy of Paraguayan History from 1956 to 1973, and again from 1984 to 1986, and the Academia de la Lengua Española from 1975 until his death. He was also president of the PEN Club and the Paraguayan Institute of Hispanic Culture, as well as a member of academies and institutes from various countries, the American Institute of History of Madrid and the Royal Academy of Arts of the Spanish capital. He lectured in various cities across Latin America and Europe.

Chaves died in Asunción on February 20, 1989, aged 81.

== Personal life and family ==
Chaves' uncle was Federico Chaves, president from 1949 to 1954. His brothers were prominent personalities of national policy, Hugo, Herman and Juan Ramon Chaves. The latter was president of the Colorado Party for many years. Julio César was a member of the Colorado Party until 1973, when he joined the Liberal Party.

== Publishing ==
Dr. Julio Cesar Chaves is the creator of an unpublished monograph, which deals with the important actions that he took in the Chaco War. This is a valuable document on the work that he accomplished in the Department II, his management of Prensa y Propaganda that depended directly on the Commander in Chief of Army Operations.

Department II was organized by the then mayor Tomás Romero Pereira, supported by Chaves, and its task included military intelligence. Prensa y Propaganda depended directly on Chaves by express order of president Eusebio Ayala, who mandated him to carry out daily bulletins to counter Bolivian propaganda. According to Chaves himself, these bulletins were captured by the main radiotelegraph stations in Paraguay as well as in Bolivia, Argentina, Brazil, Chile and Peru.

President Ayala wrote the first three materials as a model. The first alluded to the Chilean mercenaries in the Bolivian army, the second to the superiority of the Paraguayan soldiers' morale over the Bolivian, and the third to the resources expended by Bolivia during the Chaco conflict. Bolivian prisoners were very valuable as sources of information for these bulletins, which led to a deterioration in the minds of the enemy combatants, as acknowledged after the war by Bolivian Colonel David Toro.

== Works ==
In 1936 Chaves wrote El Chaco in adjustments for peace (unpublished), and in 1937, he edited History of relations between Buenos Aires and Paraguay.

His other works include:

- El supremo dictador (The supreme dictator).
- Castelli, El adalid de mayo (Castelli, the May Champion).
- San Martín y Bolívar en Guayaquil (San Martín and Bolívar in Guayaquil).
- El presidente López (President López).
- Vida y obra de Don Carlos (Life and work of Don Carlos).
- El General Díaz (General Diaz).
- Biografía del vencedor de Curupayty (Biography of the Curupayty conqueror).
- Compendio de historia paraguaya (Compendium of Paraguayan history).
- Compendio de historia americana (Compendium of American history).
- Unamuno y América (Unamuno and America).
- Historia del descubrimiento y conquista del Río de la Plata y el Paraguay (History of the discovery and conquest of the Rio de la Plata and Paraguay).
- Itinerario de Antonio Machado (Antonio Machado Journey).
- Túpac Amaru.
- La causa de la independencia americana (The cause of Latin American independence).

== Sources ==
- Biographical Dictionary "Forgers of Paraguay", First Edition January 2000. Distributed editions of Quevedo. Buenos Aires, Argentina.
