= Kris Diaz =

American football coach and athletic director (born 1955)

Biographical details
- Born: November 19, 1955 (age 70); Amherst, Ohio, U.S.
- Education: Baldwin–Wallace College (1978)

Coaching career (HC unless noted)

Football
- 1976–1977: Baldwin–Wallace (SA)
- 1978: Akron (GA)
- 1979–1982: Friends (OC)
- 1983–1988: Moorhead State (OL)
- 1989–1995: Bemidji State
- 1996–1997: Elyria Catholic HS (OH)
- 1998–2007: Baldwin–Wallace (assistant)

Basketball
- 1980–1982: Friends (assistant)

Track and field
- 1980–1982: Friends
- 1983–1988: Moorhead State (assistant)

Administrative career (AD unless noted)
- 1983–1988: Moorhead State (assistant AD)
- 2006–2008: Baldwin–Wallace (assistant AD)
- 2008–2020: Baldwin–Wallace / Baldwin Wallace

Head coaching record
- Overall: 13–55 (college football)

Accomplishments and honors

Awards
- 2× NIC / NSIC Coach of the Year (1989, 1995)

Kris Arthur Diaz (born November 19, 1955) is an American former college football coach and athletic director. He was the head football coach for Bemidji State University from 1989 to 1995 and for Elyria Catholic High School from 1996 to 1997. He was the athletic director for Baldwin Wallace University from 2008 until his retirement in June 2020.

== Career ==
Diaz grew up in Amherst, Ohio, and attended Marion L. Steele High School. He graduated in 1974. He attended Baldwin–Wallace College—now known as Baldwin Wallace University—from 1974 to 1977 and graduated in 1978. In 1976 and 1977 he served as a student assistant under head coach Lee Tressel. In his last season in 1977 he was a member of the 9–1 Ohio Athletic Conference (OAC) championship team.

In 1978, Diaz joined Akron as a graduate assistant under head coach Jim Dennison. After one season, he joined Friends as the team's offensive coordinator under first-year head coach Dale Liston who was the defensive coordinator for Akron during Diaz's stint with the team. In 1983, Diaz was hired as the offensive line coach for Moorhead State under head coach Ross Fortier. During his six-year run as the teams line coach he was a member of two Northern Intercollegiate Conference (NIC) championships including a trip to the NAIA Division I quarterfinals in his last season in 1988.

In 1989, Diaz was hired as the head football coach for Bemidji State as the successor to John Peterson. Diaz inherited a team that came off of a 1–9 season and brought them to a 4–5 record in his first season. He was named NIC Coach of the Year following the season. Over the next five seasons his team would not win more than two games. His best season during that five-year stretch was in 1991 when he led the team to a 2–7 record. In his last season in 1995, he led the team to a 3–7 record and was named NSIC Coach of the Year. Diaz resigned following the season, stating "personal reasons" as the reason. He ended his seven-year career with Bemidji State with an overall record of 13–55, with his best season coming in his first when they finished 4–5.

In 1996, Diaz was hired as the head football coach for Elyria Catholic High School. He maintained the position for two seasons. In 1998, he rejoined his alma mater, Baldwin–Wallace, as an assistant coach under head coaches Bob Packard and John Snell.

During Diaz's tenure with Friends he served as an assistant basketball coach and head track and field coach. When he was hired as the offensive line coach by Moorhead State in 1983, he also served as an assistant track and field coach.

From 1983 to 1988, Diaz was an assistant athletic director for Moorhead State. In 2006, he was hired as an assistant athletic director for his alma mater, Baldwin–Wallace. He was promoted to full-time athletic director in 2008. He maintained the position until June 30, 2020, after he announced his retirement on June 15.

== Head coaching record ==
=== College football ===
Year	Team	Overall	Conference	Standing	Bowl/playoffs
Bemidji State Beavers (Northern Intercollegiate Conference / Northern Sun Intercollegiate Conference) (1989–1995)
1989	Bemidji State	4–5	2–4	6th	
1990	Bemidji State	1–10	0–6	7th	
1991	Bemidji State	2–7	1–4	5th	
1992	Bemidji State	2–8	2–4	5th	
1993	Bemidji State	0–10	0–6	7th	
1994	Bemidji State	1–8	1–5	6th	
1995	Bemidji State	3–7	3–3	T–3rd	
Bemidji State:		13–55	9–32		
Total:		13–55			
