= Jeff Tesch =

American football coach (born c. 1955)

Biographical details
- Born: c. 1955 (age 70–71)
- Education: Moorhead State University (1978)

Playing career
- 1974–1977: Moorhead State
- 1978: Atlanta Falcons*
- Position: Wide receiver

Coaching career (HC unless noted)
- 1979–1980: Mason City HS (IA) (WR/DE)
- 1981–1982: North Dakota (GA)
- 1983: Montana State (OL)
- 1984: Central Missouri State (OL)
- 1985: Central Missouri State (OC/OL)
- 1986–1994: North Dakota (OL)
- 1995: North Dakota (AHC/OL)
- 1996–2015: Bemidji State

Head coaching record
- Overall: 126–91
- Bowls: 0–1

Accomplishments and honors

Championships
- 1 NSIC (2006)

Jeffrey Tesch (born c. 1955) is an American former college football coach. He was the head coach for the Bemidji State Beavers football team from 1996 to 2015. On August 30, 2016, he was fired after he used a racial slur at a preseason practice and the players refused to continue to play for him. He also coached for Mason City High School, Montana State, Central Missouri State, and North Dakota. He played college football for Moorhead State as a wide receiver and professionally for the Atlanta Falcons of the National Football League (NFL).

== Head coaching record ==
Year	Team	Overall	Conference	Standing	Bowl/playoffs	AFCA^{#}
Bemidji State Beavers (Northern Sun Intercollegiate Conference) (1996–2015)
1996	Bemidji State	2–8	1–5	6th		
1997	Bemidji State	2–8	1–5	T–6th		
1998	Bemidji State	6–4	4–2	3rd		
1999	Bemidji State	8–3	6–2	T–2nd		
2000	Bemidji State	9–2	6–2	2nd		9 (Midwest)
2001	Bemidji State	7–4	5–4	4th		
2002	Bemidji State	6–5	6–3	4th		
2003	Bemidji State	7–4	5–3	T–4th		
2004	Bemidji State	8–3	5–2	T–2nd		
2005	Bemidji State	7–3	4–3	T–4th		
2006	Bemidji State	9–3	8–0	1st	L Mineral Water Bowl	23
2007	Bemidji State	7–4	6–3	4th		
2008	Bemidji State	5–6	4–6	T–3rd (North)		
2009	Bemidji State	8–3	7–3	T–2nd (North)		
2010	Bemidji State	7–4	6–4	3rd (North)		
2011	Bemidji State	8–3	7–3	3rd (North)		
2012	Bemidji State	7–4	7–4	T–2nd (North)		
2013	Bemidji State	3–8	3–8	7th (North)		
2014	Bemidji State	3–8	3–8	6th (North)		
2015	Bemidji State	7–4	7–4	2nd (North)		
Bemidji State:		126–91	101–74			
Total:		126–91				
National championship Conference title Conference division title or championship game berth
