= Chester Anderson (American football) =

American football coach

Biographical details
- Born: June 12, 1918; White River, South Dakota, U.S.
- Died: November 19, 2008 (aged 90); Bemidji, Minnesota, U.S.
- Education: South Dakota

Coaching career (HC unless noted)

Football
- 1949–1952: Anoka HS (MN)
- 1953–1954: Buena Vista
- 1956–1960: Bemidji State
- 1962–1965: Bemidji State

Wrestling
- 1955–1981: Bemidji State

Head coaching record
- Overall: 50–42–7 (college football)

Accomplishments and honors

Championships
- Football; 2 MSCC (1957, 1959) Wrestling; 3 NIC (1972, 1973, 1976)

Awards
- NSIC Hall of Fame (2000)

Chester Albert Anderson (June 12, 1918 – November 19, 2008) was an American football and wrestling coach. He served as the head football coach at Buena Vista College in Storm Lake, Iowa from 1953 to 1954 and two stints as the head football coach Bemidji State University in Bemidji, Minnesota, from 1956 to 1960 and again in 1962 to 1965, compiling a career college football coaching record of 50–42–7. As football coach at Bemidji, Anderson had a record of 43–34–5 and won two conference titles. He was also the school's head wrestling coach from 1955 until his retirement in 1981.

== Head coaching record ==
=== College football ===
| Year | Team | Overall | Conference | Standing | Bowl/playoffs |
|---|---|---|---|---|---|
Buena Vista Beavers (Iowa Conference) (1953–1954)
| 1953 | Buena Vista | 2–6–1 | 0–3 | 4th (Northern) | |
| 1954 | Buena Vista | 5–3–1 | 3–2–1 | 5th | |
| Buena Vista: | | 7–9–2 | 3–5–1 | | |
Bemidji State Beavers (Minnesota State College Conference / Northern State College Conference) (1955–1960)
| 1955 | Bemidji State | 4–3–1 | 1–3 | T–3rd | |
| 1956 | Bemidji State | 2–4–2 | 0–3–1 | 5th | |
| 1957 | Bemidji State | 4–4 | 3–1 | T–1st | |
| 1958 | Bemidji State | 7–1 | 4–1 | 2nd | |
| 1959 | Bemidji State | 6–1–1 | 4–1 | T–1st | |
| 1960 | Bemidji State | 2–6 | 2–3 | T–3rd | |
Bemidji State Beavers (Northern State College Conference / Northern Intercollegiate Conference) (1962–1965)
| 1962 | Bemidji State | 3–6 | 2–3 | T–4th | |
| 1963 | Bemidji State | 6–1–1 | 3–1–1 | 2nd | |
| 1964 | Bemidji State | 5–4 | 3–2 | 3rd | |
| 1965 | Bemidji State | 4–4 | 3–2 | T–2nd | |
| Bemidji State: | | 43–34–5 | 25–20–2 | | |
| Total: | | 50–42–7 | | | |
National championship Conference title Conference division title or championship game berth
