= Aurelio Vásquez =

Chilean footballer

Personal information
- Full name: Aurelio Enrique Vásquez Valenzuela
- Date of birth: 21 November 1942
- Place of birth: Santiago, Chile
- Date of death: 3 August 2019 (aged 76)
- Place of death: Recoleta, Santiago, Chile
- Height: 1.72 m (5 ft 8 in)
- Position: Left winger

Youth career
- Thunder

Senior career*
Years	Team	Apps	(Gls)
- Deportes La Serena
- Fatucen
1961–1965	Audax Italiano	85	(24)
1966	Santiago Wanderers	11	(3)
1967–1969	Santiago Morning	37	(10)
1974	31 de Octubre		
1974	Ingenieros de Oruro		
1975	Blooming		

International career
1965	Chile		
- * Club domestic league appearances and goals

Aurelio Enrique Vásquez Valenzuela (21 November 1942 – 3 August 2019) was a Chilean footballer who played as a forward. Besides Chile, he played in Bolivia.

== Career ==
A right-footed player, Vásquez used to play on the attacking left side. As a youth player, Vásquez was with Club Thunder from Quinta Normal, Santiago. After, he played for both Deportes La Serena in the second division and Fatucen, a previous club to Iberia-Puente Alto, in the Central Regional Championship.

He spent nine seasons at the Chilean top division between 1961 and 1969 playing for three clubs: Audax Italiano (1961–65), Santiago Wanderers (1966), reaching the third place in the league, and Santiago Morning (1967–69). He made his debut at the division in September 1961 against Unión Española wearing the number 11.

As an anecdote, he played as a goalkeeper for Santiago Wanderers in a 1–2 win against Everton, the classic rival, due to the fact that Omar Aránguiz injured.

After Santiago Morning were relegated to the second division in 1969, he and Leopoldo Vallejos tried to play in Mexico thanks to Carlos Reinoso, but finally his teammate Aurelio Valenzuela went to that country. Later, he moved to Bolivia and played for 31 de Octubre (1974), Ingenieros de Oruro (1974) and Blooming (1975) in the top division.

At international level, he was a member of the Chile national team in 1965 with the coach Francisco Hormazábal.

== Personal life ==
Vásquez was nicknamed Toscano (Tuscan) like the Argentine actor Toscanito (Little Tuscan), who performed a goalkeeper in the 1948 film Pelota de trapo (Rag ball) what he had seen alongside his friend, Valentín Beperet.

After leaving Santiago Morning in 1969 and before moving to Bolivia, he worked as a driver in La Vega market for four years.

Vásquez made his home in El Salto neighborhood, Recoleta commune. In his last years, he suffered the Berger's disease and hearing loss.
