= Sparky Adams (American football) =

American football player and coach (1930–2010)

Biographical details
- Born: August 26, 1930
- Died: April 22, 2010 (aged 79); Fond du Lac, Wisconsin, U.S.

Playing career

Football
- 1951–1954: Lawrence

Coaching career (HC unless noted)

Football
- 1960–1964: Oconto Falls HS (WI)
- 1969–1972: Drake (assistant)
- 1973–1977: Chadron State
- 1978–1981: Bemidji State
- 1982–1985: Dubuque (assistant)
- 1993–1998: Carroll (WI) (assistant)
- 1999: Lawrence (assistant)

Baseball
- 1982–1985: Dubuque

Administrative career (AD unless noted)
- 1960–1969: Dallas Cowboys (scout/part-time administrator)

Head coaching record
- Overall: 3–53–1 (college football); 43–59 (college baseball)

Richard A. "Sparky" Adams (August 26, 1930 – April 22, 2010) was an American football and baseball coach. He served as the head football coach at Chadron State College in Chadron, Nebraska from 1973 to 1977 and at Bemidji State University in Bemidji, Minnesota from 1978 to 1981, compiling a career college football coaching record of 3–53–1. Adams also served as the head baseball coach at the University of Dubuque from 1982 to 1985, tallying a mark of 43–59. Early in his career, he was hired by Gil Brandt to be a scout and part-time assistant for the fledgling Dallas Cowboys of the National Football League (NFL).

== Head coaching record ==
=== College football ===
Year	Team	Overall	Conference	Standing	Bowl/playoffs
Chadron State Eagles (Nebraska College Conference) (1973–1976)
1973	Chadron State	7–3	1–2	T–3rd	
1974	Chadron State	6–3	2–1	2nd	
1975	Chadron State	6–3	2–1	2nd	
1976	Chadron State	4–6	1–2	T–2nd	
Chadron State Eagles (NAIA Division II independent) (1977)
1977	Chadron State	8–2			
Chadron State:		31–17	6–6		
Bemidji State Beavers (Northern Intercollegiate Conference) (1978–1981)
1978	Bemidji State	0–9	0–8	9th	
1979	Bemidji State	1–8–1	1–7	8th	
1980	Bemidji State	1–9	1–7	9th	
1981	Bemidji State	0–10	0–6	7th	
Bemidji State:		2–36–1	2–28		
Total:		33–53–1			
