= Brent Bolte =

American football coach (born 1977)

Current position
- Title: Head coach
- Team: Bemidji State
- Conference: NSIC
- Record: 81–38

Biographical details
- Born: July 7, 1977 (age 49); Waverly, Iowa, U.S.
- Education: Cornell College (1998); Bemidji State University

Playing career
- 1995–1998: Cornell (IA)
- Position: Linebacker

Coaching career (HC unless noted)
- 1999: Loras (WR)
- 2000–2001: Bemidji State (WR)
- 2002–2004: Bemidji State (LB)
- 2005–2012: Bemidji State (co-DC)
- 2013–2015: Bemidji State (DC)
- 2016–present: Bemidji State

Head coaching record
- Overall: 81–38
- Bowls: 1–0
- Tournaments: 5–4 (NCAA D-II playoffs)

Accomplishments and honors

Championships
- 2 NSIC (2021–2022); 4 NSIC North Division (2019, 2021–2022, 2026)

Brent Bolte (born July 7, 1977) is an American college football coach. He is the head football coach for Bemidji State University, a position he has held since 2016. He previously coached for Loras. He played college football at Cornell as a linebacker.

== Head coaching record ==
| Year | Team | Overall | Conference | Standing | Bowl/playoffs | AFCA^{#} | D2^{°} |
|---|---|---|---|---|---|---|---|
Bemidji State Beavers (Northern Sun Intercollegiate Conference) (2016–present)
| 2016 | Bemidji State | 9–3 | 8–3 / 5–2 | 3rd / 2nd (North) | W Mineral Water Bowl | | |
| 2017 | Bemidji State | 8–3 | 8–3 / 6–1 | 5th / 2nd (North) | | | |
| 2018 | Bemidji State | 7–4 | 7–4 / 5–2 | T–5th / T–3rd (North) | | | |
| 2019 | Bemidji State | 8–3 | 8–3 / 6–1 | T–3rd / T–1st (North) | | | |
| 2020–21 | No team—COVID-19 | | | | | | |
| 2021 | Bemidji State | 10–3 | 9–2 / 6–0 | T–1st / 1st (North) | L NCAA Division II Second Round | 19 | |
| 2022 | Bemidji State | 10–3 | 9–2 / 6–0 | T–1st / 1st (North) | L NCAA Division II Second Round | 24 | |
| 2023 | Bemidji State | 9–3 | 8–2 | T–2nd | L NCAA Division II Second Round | 16 | 12 |
| 2024 | Bemidji State | 10–4 | 7–3 | T–2nd | L NCAA Division II Quarterfinal | 13 | 9 |
| 2025 | Bemidji State | 4–7 | 4–6 / 3–3 | 9th / T–4th (North) | | | |
| 2026 | Bemidji State | 6–5 | 6–4 / 5–1 | T–7th / T–1st (North) | | | |
| Bemidji State: | | 81–38 | 74–32 | | | | |
| Total: | | 81–38 | | | | | |
National championship Conference title Conference division title or championship game berth
