= Chet Anderson Stadium =

Stadium at Bemidji State University in Minnesota, US

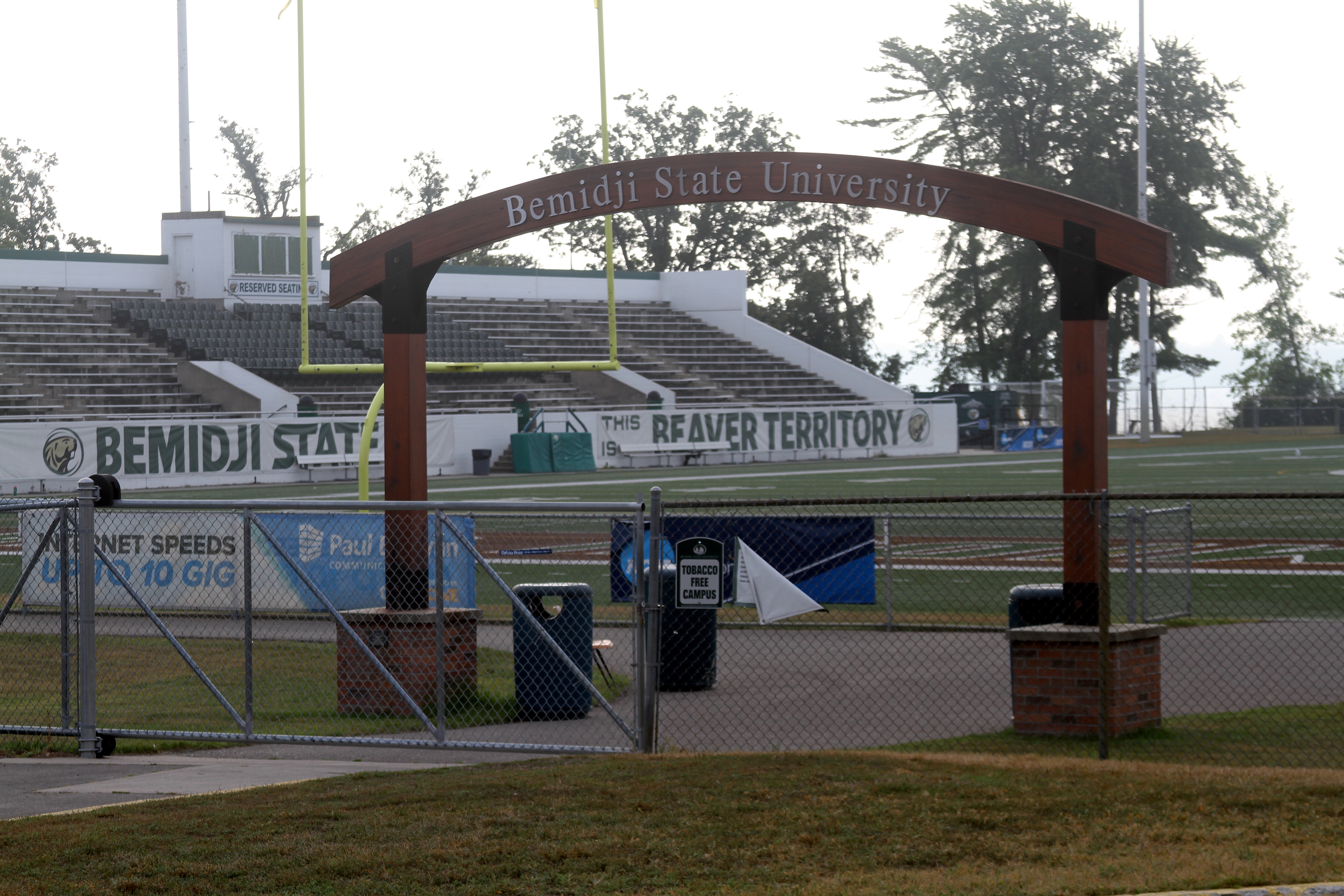
- View of the stadium in 2024
- Interactive map of Chet Anderson Stadium
- Full name: Chet Anderson Stadium
- Address: Bemidji, Minnesota; U.S.
- Coordinates: 47°29′01″N 94°52′20″W
- Owner: Bemidji State University
- Operator: Bemidji State Beavers
- Capacity: 5,000
- Type: Stadium
- Current use: Football; Soccer

Construction
- Built: 1939
- Opened: 27 September 1940

Tenants
- Bemidji State Beavers men's football, women's soccer

Website
- bsubeavers.com

Chet Anderson Stadium is the home football stadium of Bemidji State University in Bemidji, Minnesota.

In 1939, a federal grant enabled Bemidji State to build new athletic facilities. The first game held was against Concordia College, Moorhead on September 27, 1940. Through various expansions over the years, the capacity currently sits at 5,000.

On October 5, 1996, the stadium was officially renamed in honor of Chester Anderson, head football coach from 1955 to 1965.
