= Aurelio Valenzuela =

Chilean footballer and manager

Personal information
- Full name: Aurelio Gerardo Valenzuela Flores
- Date of birth: 2 December 1942 (age 83)
- Place of birth: Arica, Chile
- Position: Midfielder

Senior career*
Years	Team	Apps	(Gls)
1962–1964	San Luis de Quillota	75	(18)
1965–1969	Santiago Morning	86	(24)
1971–1972	Santiago Morning		

International career
1965–1967	Chile		

Managerial career
- 1976: Santiago Morning (interim)
- 1979: Audax Italiano
- 1984: Cobresal (youth)
- 1985: Deportes Iquique
- 1986: Regional Atacama
- 1988: Regional Atacama
- 1989: Deportes Arica
- Guadalajara (youth)
- Toluca (youth)
- 2003: Nacional Tijuana
- 2011: Baja California (women)
- * Club domestic league appearances and goals

Aurelio Gerardo Valenzuela Flores (born 2 December 1942) is a Chilean football manager and former player who played as a midfielder.

== Playing career ==
Born in Arica, Chile, Valenzuela played for two clubs in the Chilean Primera División. He made his professional debut in 1962 with San Luis de Quillota, playing for them until 1964. As a member of them, he also faced the English club Stoke City in a friendly match on 3 June 1964.

In 1965, he switched to Santiago Morning until 1969. After the team was relegated to the Segunda División in 1969, he moved to play to Mexico thanks to Carlos Reinoso, then a player of América, in place of his compatriots Leopoldo Vallejos and Aurelio Vásquez. Back in Chile, he rejoined Santiago Morning until 1972.

At international level, he was a member of the Chile national team between 1965 and 1967.

== Coaching career ==
As a football coach, Valenzuela led Santiago Morning, Audax Italiano, Deportes Iquique, Regional Atacama and Deportes Arica in his homeland. In addition, he led the Cobresal youth system in 1984.

In 1986, he took part in the Colegio de Entrenadores de Fútbol de Chile (National Association of Football Managers of Chile).

Once in Mexico, he led Nacional Tijuana in 2003. He also worked in the youth systems of clubs such as Guadalajara and Toluca.

He has also started football academies like Atenea and the namesake, Aurelio Valenzuela and worked with women players like the Baja California state team in the Olimpiada Nacional tournament.

== Personal life ==
Valenzuela made his home in Querétaro, Mexico.
