= R. B. Frost =

American sports coach and administrator (1907–1989)

Biographical details
- Born: April 26, 1907; Sheyenne, North Dakota, U.S.
- Died: February 17, 1989 (aged 81); Fort Garland, Colorado, U.S.

Playing career

Football
- 1924–1927: Luther

Coaching career (HC unless noted)

Football
- 1935–1937: Bemidji State

Basketball
- 1935–1942: Bemidji State
- 1946–1947: Bemidji State
- 1947–1954: South Dakota State

Baseball
- 1948–1949: South Dakota State

Administrative career (AD unless noted)
- 1947–1960: South Dakota State

Head coaching record
- Overall: 7–14–1 (football); 166–134 (basketball); 8–14 (baseball)

Reuben Bernhard "Jack" Frost (April 26, 1907 – February 17, 1989) was an American football, basketball, and baseball coach and college athletics administrator. He served as the head football coach at Bemidji State University in Bemidji, Minnesota from 1935 to 1937, compiling a record of 7–14–1. Frost was also the head basketball coach at Bemidji State from 1935 to 1942 and in 1946–47 and at South Dakota State University from 1947 to 1954, amassing a career college basketball coaching record of 166–134.

== Head coaching record ==
=== Football ===
Year	Team	Overall	Conference	Standing	Bowl/playoffs
Bemidji State Beavers (Northern Teachers Athletic Conference) (1935–1937)
1935	Bemidji State	1–6–1	1–4	5th	
1936	Bemidji State	3–4	1–4	5th	
1936	Bemidji State	3–4	2–3	4th	
Bemidji State:		7–14–1	4–11		
Total:		7–14–1			
