= Dolphins of the Sea =

Sculpture in Boston, Massachusetts, U.S.

- Artist: Katharine Lane Weems
- Location: Boston, Massachusetts, U.S.
- 42°21′30.7″N 71°3′1.7″W

Dolphins of the Sea is a bronze sculpture by Katharine Lane Weems, installed outside the New England Aquarium on Boston's Central Wharf, in the U.S. state of Massachusetts. The sculpture depicts a pod of swimming dolphins and measures approximately 4 × 3 × 7 ft. It was copyrighted in 1977. The work was surveyed by the Smithsonian Institution's "Save Outdoor Sculpture!" program in 1997. The sculpture was moved from its original location in the fountain on the aquarium's plaza when the fountain was removed; it is still near the aquarium, but it is now between the Boston Harbor Garage and the Harborwalk.

== See also ==
- 1977 in art
