= Aubrey Martyn =

Australian rules footballer, born 1907

Personal information
- Full name: Aubrey James Martyn
- Born: 4 January 1907; Brunswick, Victoria
- Died: 13 February 1989 (aged 82)
- Original team: Coburg
- Height: 179 cm (5 ft 10 in)
- Weight: 77 kg (170 lb)

Playing career^{1}
Years	Club	Games (Goals)
1929–1933	Carlton	38 (0)
- ^{1} Playing statistics correct to the end of 1933.

Aubrey James Martyn (4 January 1907 – 13 February 1989) was an Australian rules footballer who played for the Carlton Football Club in the Victorian Football League (VFL). His brother, Colin Martyn, also played in the VFL.
