= Efraím Cardozo =

Paraguayan politician and historian

- Birth name: Efraím Cardozo
- Born: 16 October 1906; Villarrica, Paraguay
- Died: 10 April 1973 (aged 66); Buenos Aires, Argentina

Efraím Cardozo (16 October 1906 – 10 April 1973) was a Paraguayan politician and historian.

== Childhood and studies ==
Born in Villarrica, Paraguay, he was a son of a teacher and bureaucrat guaireño Ramon Indalecio Cardozo and Juana Sosa. His father was involved in the educational reform of 1924. He grew up in an enriching household which marked his later life as a journalist and historian. He married Hilda Clara Saguier Aceval.

In 1921, he joined the Universidad Nacional de Asunción where in 1925 became to preside over the Student Center and ran the magazine "Ariel" along with Juan Esteban Carrón. He finished high school with relevant qualifications and began his studies in advocacy in the institution from which also his mother had graduated. His doctoral thesis was on "The Chaco in the Viceroyalty of River Plate." He then was a professor at the Catholic University and at the San José and Teresiano high schools.

== Public activities ==
In 1931 he served as secretary for president Jose Patricio Guggiari; in 1933, he was secretary of the national legation in Rio de Janeiro; during the Chaco War, he served in commander-in-chief José Félix Estigarribia's headquarters, and was responsible for redacting diplomatic documents which defended the Paraguay's claims to the territory they were fighting over. After the war, he was appointed him a member of the Boundary Commission whose procedures were implemented with the signing of the peace accords of June 12, 1935. He edited the newspaper "El liberal". He collaborated by writing articles on "La Razon" in Buenos Aires, "Radical", "ABC" and "Comunidad" of Asunción. Later, he was appointed general secretary of the Paraguayan delegation at the peace conference of 1938.

He was part of president Estigarribia's first cabinet as minister of justice, cult and civic instruction, and also was interim chancellor. During the presidency of Higinio Morínigo, Cardozo, a loyal member of the Liberal Party, went to live into exile. He settled in Buenos Aires where he wrote for the newspaper "La Razon". He stayed ten years in Argentina.

He was elected a National Deputy in 1938. In 1940, he was appointed Plenipotentiary Minister to the Argentine government. Once the Liberal party was proscribed, Cardozo returned to his old job in the newspaper “La Razon". Throughout his life, he collected valuable historical documents and information relating to Paraguay and River Plate. In 1954, he gave classes in Europe, at the Institute for Hispanic Culture invited by the Latin-American’s Graduate School.

He died while a senator of Paraguay, on 10 April 1973.

== Publications ==
Since 1923 until the beginning of the war with Bolivia, he published several works related to the defense of the legal rights of Paraguay in the conflict which threatened with the loss of Chaco Boreal. “El Chaco en el Régimen de las Intendencias. La creación de Bolivia”, “El Chaco y los Virreyes. La cuestión paraguayo-boliviana según documentos de los archivos de Buenos Aires y de Río de Janeiro”, “La Audiencia de Charcas y la Facultad de gobierno”, “Apuntes de historia cultural del Paraguay”, are all works which bear serious arguments to Paraguayan ownership of the land in dispute.

His collection of 13 volumes of "A hundred years ago," a compilation of articles published in the newspaper "La Tribuna", written throughout the centennial of the epic of the 1870s, remain an important text. "The Paraguay of the Conquest," "The Colonial Paraguay”, “The roots of nationality” and “The Independent Paraguay" are also important works amongst his writings.
