= Katharine Lane Weems =

American painter

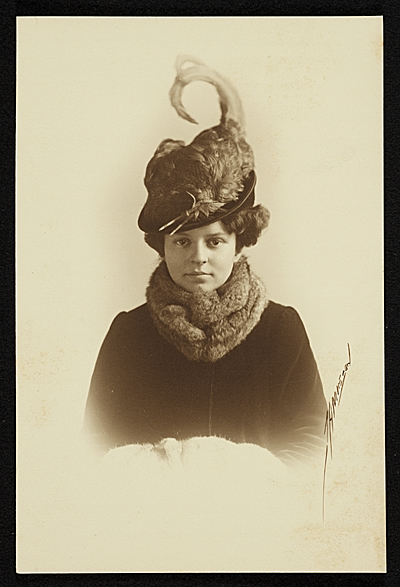
Weems, circa 1915

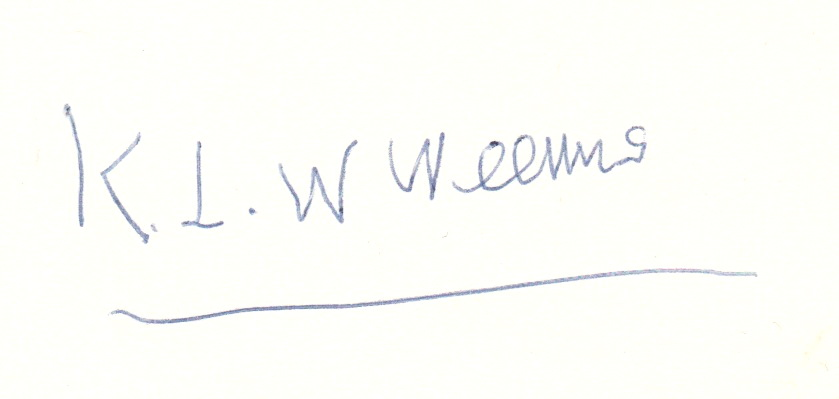

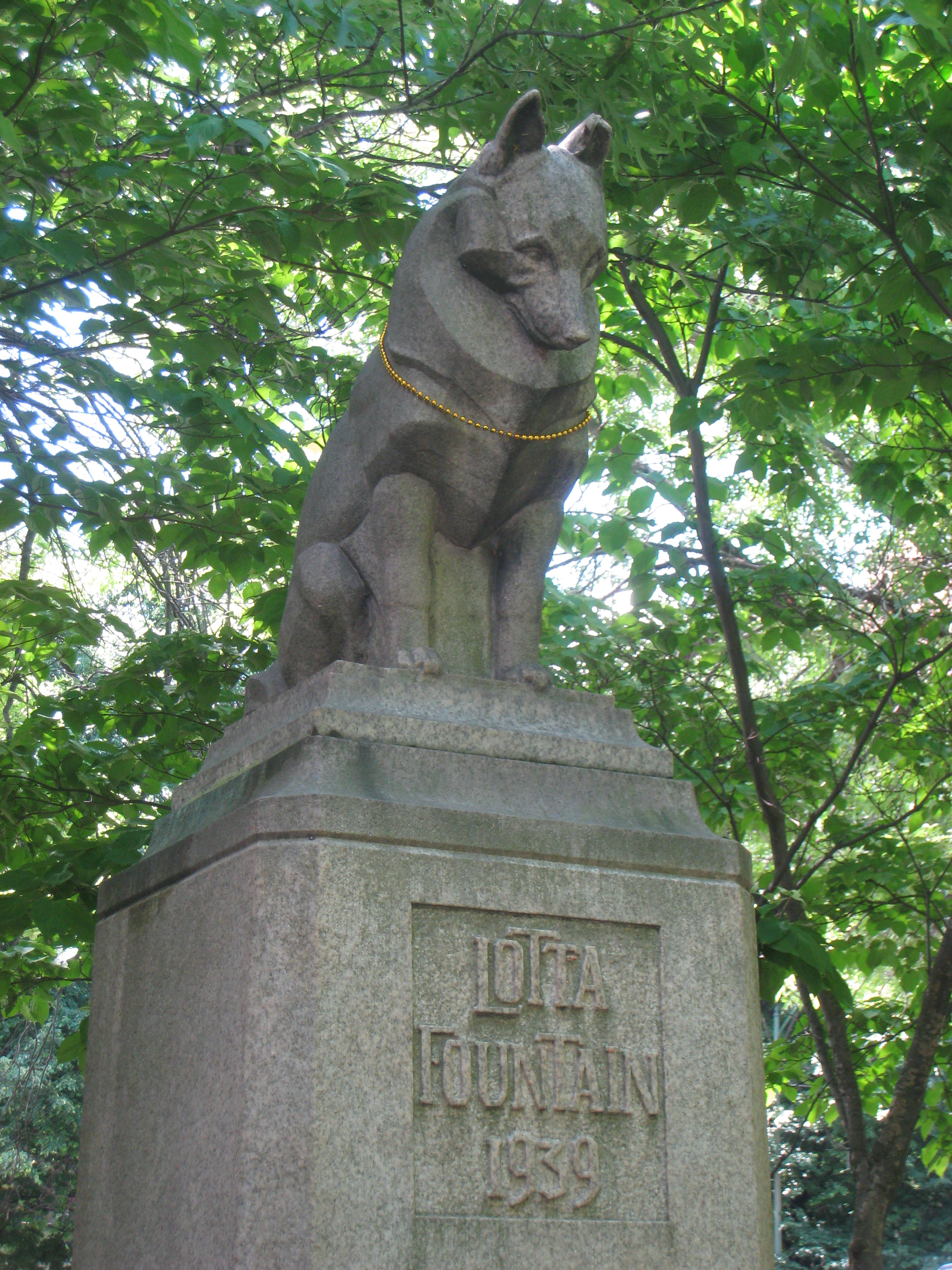
Lotta Fountain, Boston, 1939

Katharine Lane Weems born Katharine Ward Lane (February 22, 1899 – February 11, 1989) was an American sculptor famous for her realistic portrayals of animals.

== Biography ==
Weems was born Katharine Ward Lane on February 22, 1899, in Boston, the only child of Gardiner Martin and Emma Louise (Gildersleeve) Lane, and received an elite education typical for wealthy women of her class. She attended the May School in Boston, which later merged with the Brimmer School to become the Brimmer and May School.

Her father was president of the Board of Trustees of the Museum of Fine Arts, Boston, and her grandfather was classicist Basil Lanneau Gildersleeve. She was named after her aunt, Katharine Ward Lane (d. 1893), who was a watercolorist. She studied art at the Boston Museum School under Charles Grafly and George Demetrios, and also at the summer studios of Anna Hyatt Huntington. Like many woman artists of the period, Weems often faced hostility because of her gender. However, she received support from two prominent female artists of the time: Huntington and Brenda Putnam, both of whom were working in New York.

In 1926 she won two medals: a Bronze Medal at the Philadelphia Sesquicentennial Exposition, and the George D. Widener Memorial Gold Medal from the Pennsylvania Academy of the Fine Arts.

In 1960 she received an award for sculpture from the National Academy of Design and at the 1961 sculpture exhibition of the National Arts Club.

She created the dolphins outside the New England Aquarium (Dolphins of the Sea, 1977), and the Lotta Fountain at the Boston Esplanade Plaza. She served as a member of the Massachusetts Arts Commission 1941-1947, and was elected to the National Association of Women Painters and Sculptors in 1925 and to the National Institute of Arts and Letters in 1952. Several of her sculptures are held at the Museum of Fine Arts, Boston, and the Boston Athenaeum among others. Her papers are archived at Harvard University.

== Personal life ==
In 1947 she married Carrington Weems and exhibited as Katharine Ward Lane as well as Katharine Lane Weems.

In 1961, she donated the Weems family home at 53 Marlborough Street in Boston's Back Bay neighborhood to the French Library of Boston and Cambridge.

She died in Rockport, Massachusetts, on February 11, 1989.

A chair is named in her honor the Katharine Lane Weems Curator of American Decorative Arts and Sculpture at the Museum of Fine Arts in Boston.

== Works at Harvard ==
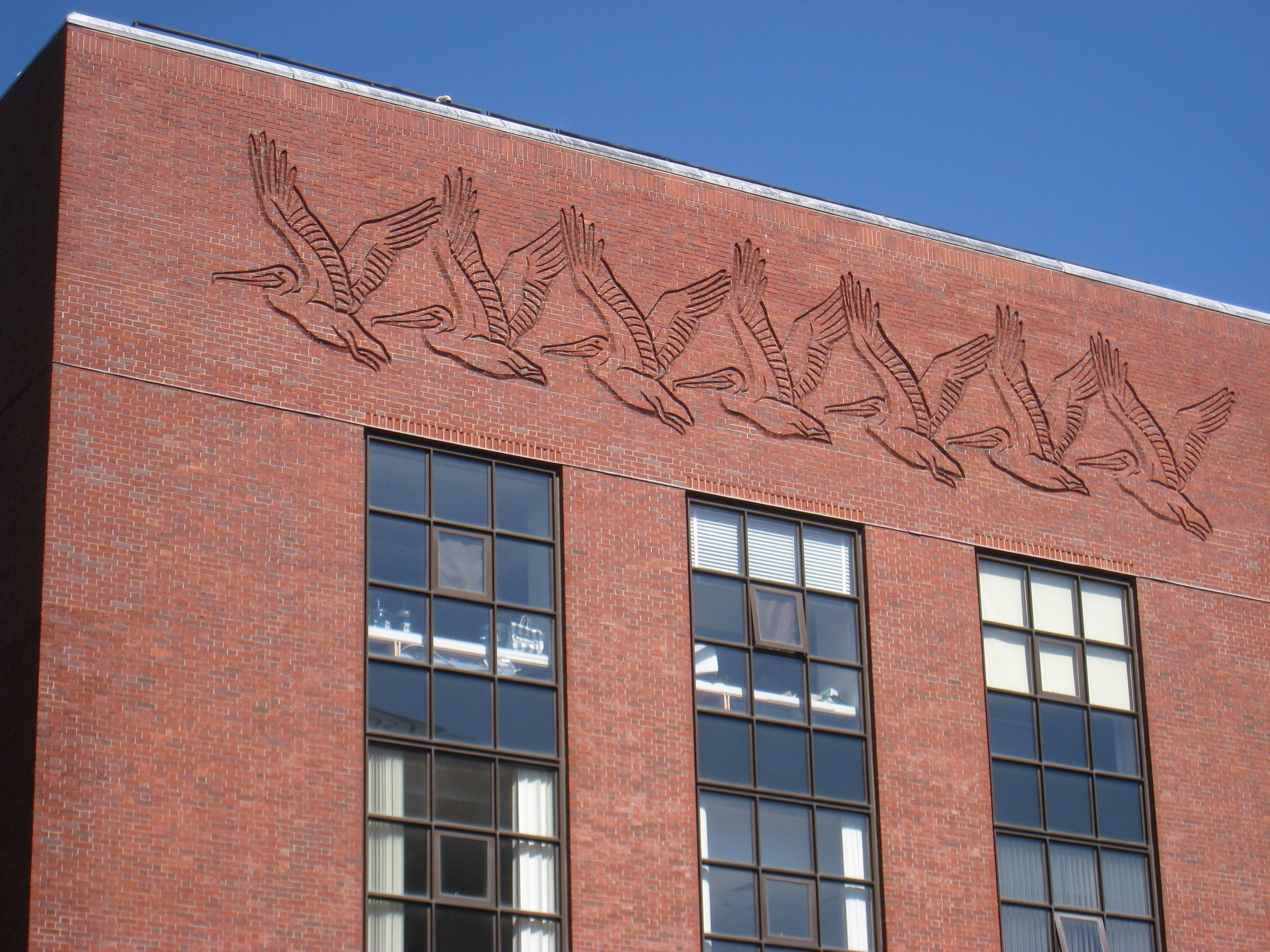
Carved brick frieze, campus of Harvard University

Weems's works have an important place in many public spaces in the Boston area. Her largest project was to provide the art at Harvard University for the Biological Laboratories built in the early 1930s. Funded by a $12 million grant from the Rockefeller Foundation, the labs were state of the art. It was decided that such a lavish facility should have art that would be equally striking, and Weems was chosen to carry out a number of projects.

First, she made the carved bronze doors at the entrance to the labs, now the Department of Molecular and Cellular Biology, (MCB). Next, she executed a series of friezes showing over 30 kinds of wildlife. This involved using pneumatic drills to carve images of animals in brick at the top of the buildings. She combined realistic and Art Deco styles and relied on a large group of construction workers to carry out the project. The economics of the Great Depression made it possible to carry out this project on a grander scale than would otherwise have been the case. Wages were lower, workers plentiful, and raw materials cheaper. In preparation for this project, she studied animals at the Bronx Zoo in New York City and also Japanese and Chinese treatments of animals, especially those found on Han dynasty tombs. She had also studied ancient Egyptian and Indian artistic presentations of animals. [Ambler, 31-33]

=== Rhinos ===
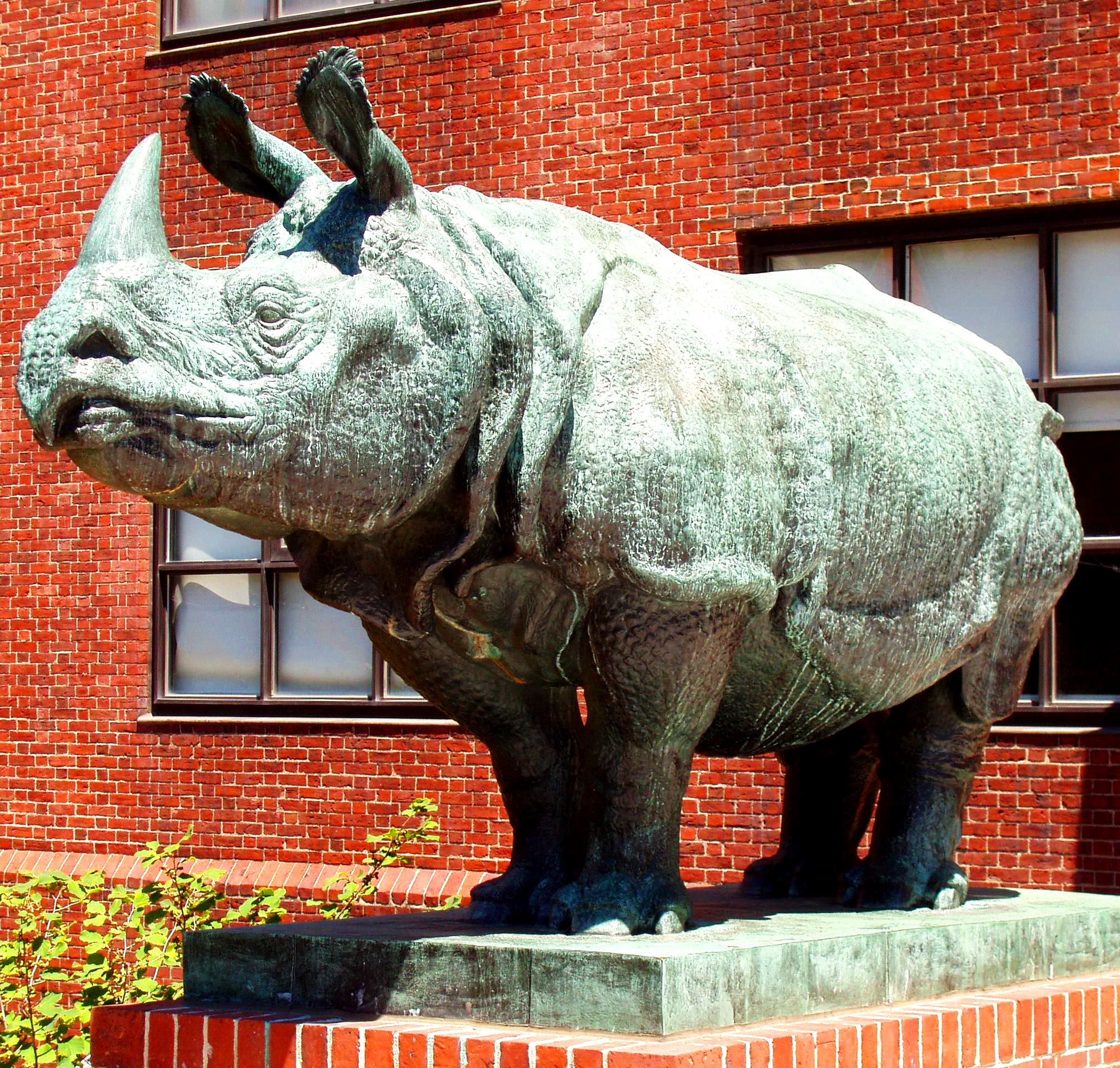
Bessie and Victoria

The third part of the Biological Laboratories project proved to be the most popular: Bessie and Victoria, two rhinoceros sculptures made of bronze and weighing 3 tons each. They are displayed in the courtyard of MCB. Weems worked on these two for five years and finally had them unveiled on May 12, 1937.

From 2003 to 2005, they were removed from the courtyard so as to be protected from any possible damage during the construction of Harvard's new mouse laboratory.

On May 11, 2007, the Department of Molecular and Cellular Biology held a birthday celebration for Bessie and Victoria. Featured speakers included E.O. Wilson, Woody Hastings and Deborah Dluhy. The two rhinos were decorated in makeup, jewelry and skirts for the event.

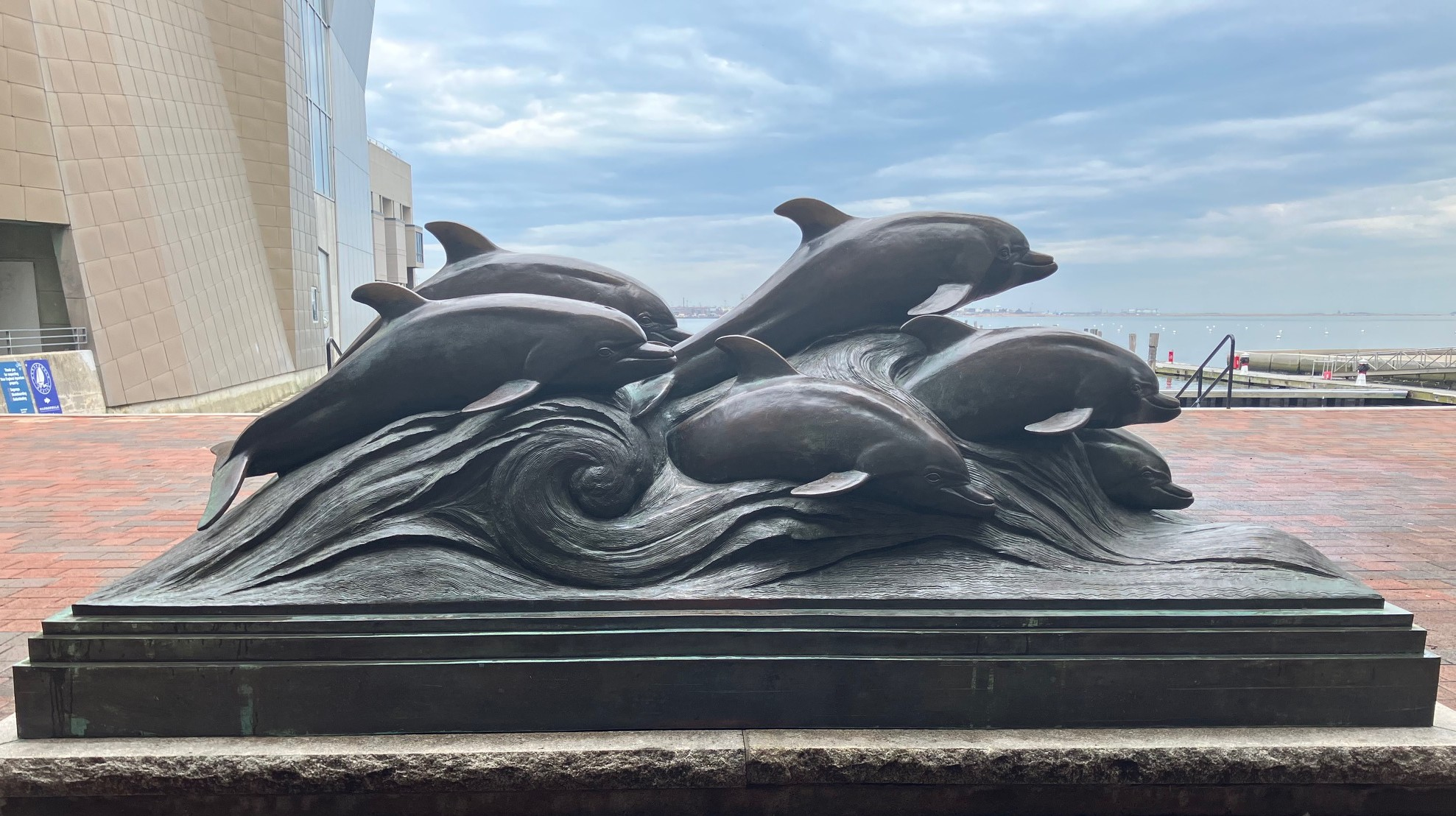
Dophins of the Sea (1977) near Boston's New England Aquarium

== Awards and honors ==
- 1926. Bronze Medal at the Philadelphia Sesquicentennial Exposition
- 1926. Widener Medal at the Pennsylvania Academy of the Fine Arts
- 1965. Creation of permanent gallery at Boston Museum of Science which showcases her small animal bronzes
- 1987. Creation of the Katharine Lane Weems Chair in Decorative Arts at Museum of Fine Arts in Boston.
- Boston Athenæum's Katharine Lane Weems Print Fund

== Collections ==
- Museum of Fine Arts, Boston,
- Brookgreen Gardens in South Carolina
- Pennsylvania Academy of the Fine Arts
- Baltimore Museum of Art
- Museum of Science, Boston,
- Boston Athenæum,
- Archives of American Art, Smithsonian Institution,

== Public works ==
- Dolphins of the Sea (1977) at the New England Aquarium
- Lotta Fountain (1939), Charles River Esplanade, Boston, with architect Edwin Dodge
- Animal friezes at Harvard University's Department of Molecular and Cellular Biology
