= Harry Gray (Australian footballer) =

Australian rules footballer

Personal information
- Full name: Harry William Gray
- Born: 23 April 1916; Stawell, Victoria
- Died: 3 February 1989 (aged 72)
- Height: 183 cm (6 ft 0 in)
- Weight: 87 kg (192 lb)

Playing career^{1}
Years	Club	Games (Goals)
1940	South Melbourne	9 (5)
- ^{1} Playing statistics correct to the end of 1940.

Harry William Gray (23 April 1916 – 3 February 1989) was an Australian rules footballer who played with South Melbourne in the Victorian Football League (VFL).

Gray made his debut for South Melbourne in 1940, having previously been a member of the Melbourne Seconds squad but not being selected for a senior match at that club.

Gray served as a Flying Officer with the Royal Australian Air Force during World War Two.
