= Lotta Fountain =

Fountain and sculpture in Boston, Massachusetts, U.S.

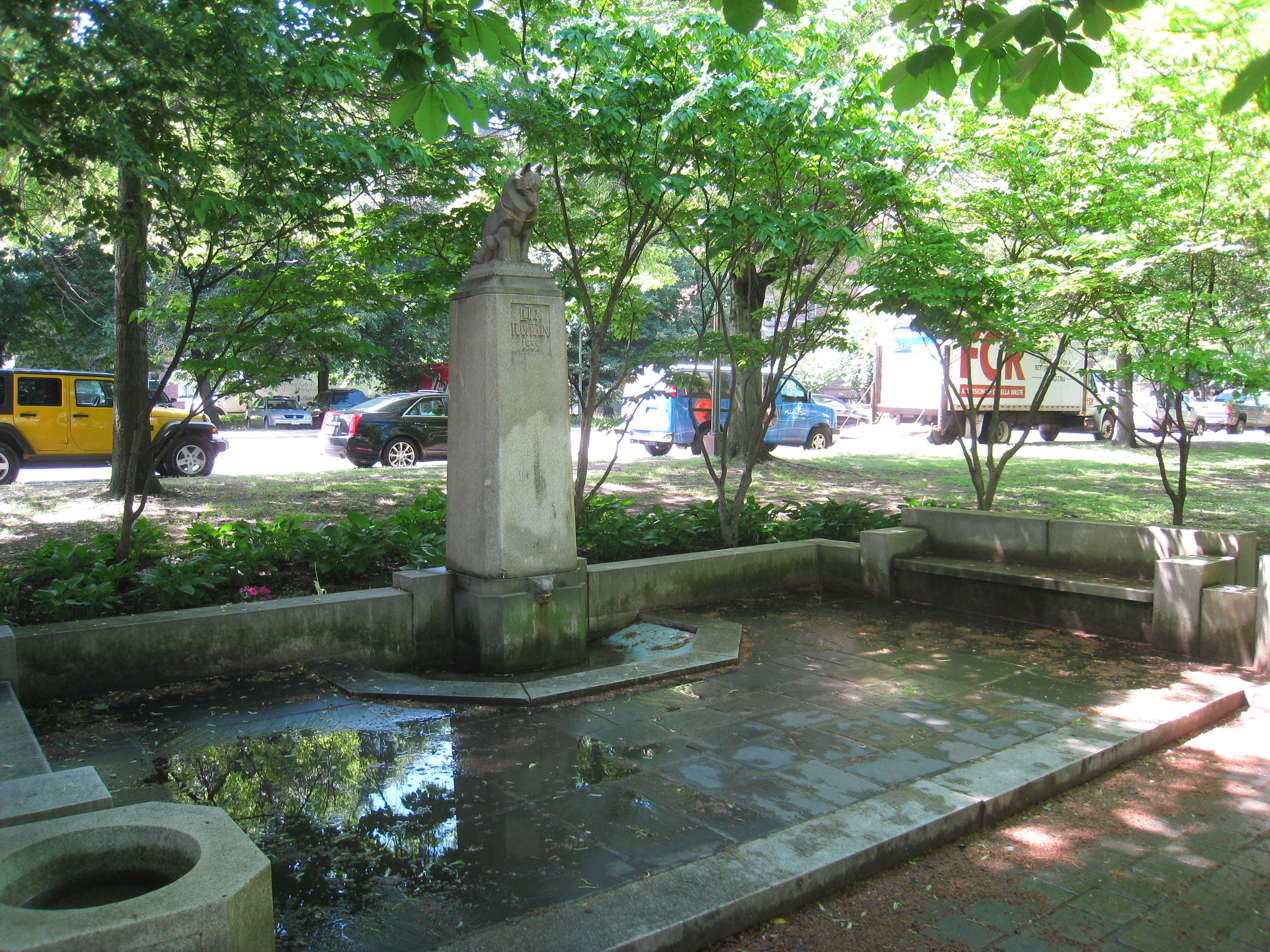
- The fountain in 2009
- Artist: Katharine Lane Weems (sculptor); J. W. Ames (architect); E. S. Dodge (architect)
- Year: 1939
- Medium: Granite sculpture
- Dimensions: 3.0 m × 6.1 m × 4.6 m (10 ft × 20 ft × 15 ft)
- Location: Boston, Massachusetts, U.S.
- 42°21′19.8″N 71°4′34.4″W

Lotta Fountain is a 1939 fountain and sculpture by artist Katharine Lane Weems and architects J. W. Ames and E. S. Dodge. It is installed along Boston's Charles River Esplanade in the U.S. state of Massachusetts.

== Description and history ==
The granite structure is approximately 10 x 20 x 15 ft. and functions as a drinking fountain. It features a square column topped with seated dog, and a spout on the base depicting the head of a cat. The work was surveyed as part of the Smithsonian Institution's "Save Outdoor Sculpture!" program in 1997.

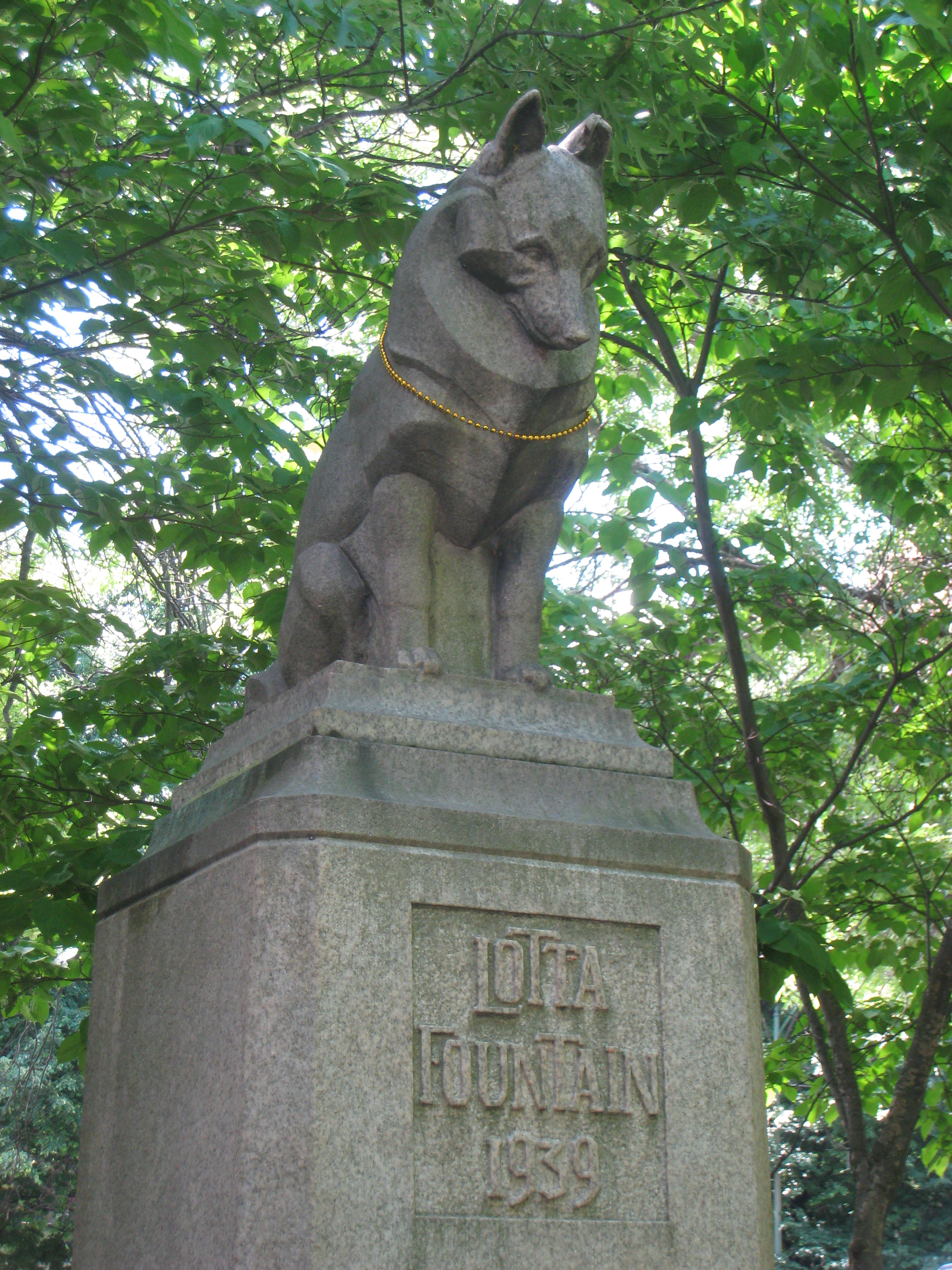
Dog sculpture

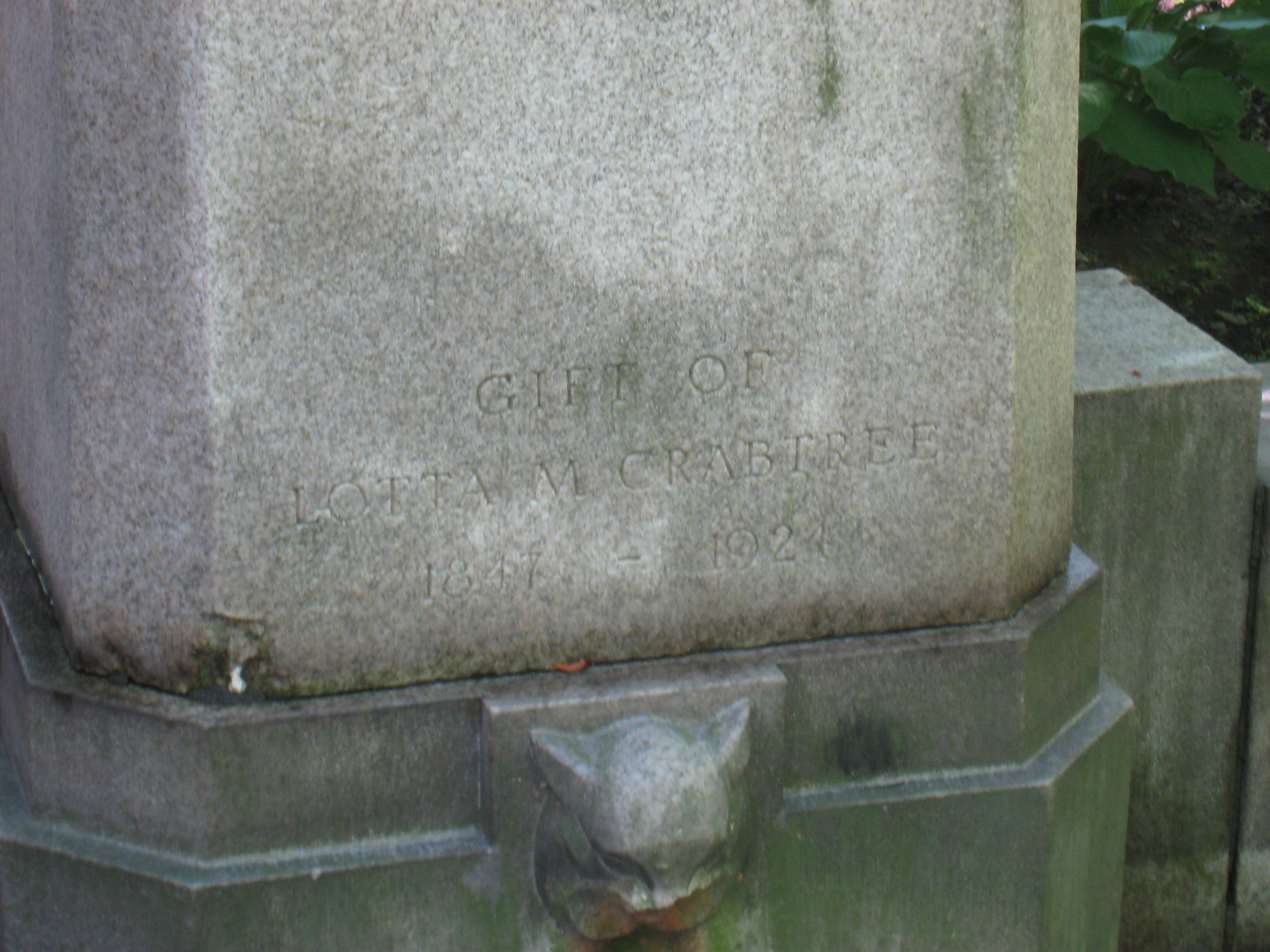
Inscription and spout

== See also ==
- 1939 in art
