= Geoff Selby =

Australian rugby league footballer

Personal information
- Full name: Geoffrey Lazarus Selby
- Born: 11 April 1965 Sydney, New South Wales, Australia
- Died: 13 February 1989 (aged 23) Cronulla, New South Wales, Australia

Playing information
- Position: Lock
Club
Years	Team	Pld	T	G	FG	P
1984–85	Illawarra Steelers	39	9	0	0	36
1986–88	St. George Dragons	44	4	0	0	16
1986–87	Salford	8	6	0	0	24
	Total	91	19	0	0	76
- Source: Whiticker/Hudson

Geoffrey Lazarus Selby (11 April 1965 – 13 February 1989) was an Australian rugby league footballer who played in the 1980s.

== Career ==
Geoff Selby was of Jewish descent. He was a promising junior player at James Cook High School at Kogarah, New South Wales, and on the recommendation of his teacher, Brian Smith, he joined the Illawarra Steelers for two seasons in 1984–1985. Selby was also a member of the 1983 Australian Schoolboys team.

Selby then moved to the St. George Dragons. A promising lock forward, Selby was placed under the personal guidance of the legendary Johnny Raper. The community was deeply saddened by Selby's premature death just before the start of the 1989 NSWRL season.

== Death ==
Geoff Selby was killed in a car accident on 13 February 1989 when a car he was traveling in hit a tree on Burraneer Bay Road, Cronulla at 2.30am. Selby was not the driver. Two other St. George Dragons players, Peter Gentle and Shaun O'Bryan were also injured in the same accident. He was cremated at Northern Suburbs Crematorium on 16 February 1989, and his wake was held at St. George Leagues Club.

== Accolades ==
Geoff Selby was a reserve for the St. George Dragons side that won the 1988 Panasonic Cup.

The St. George Illawarra Dragons annually present the "Geoff Selby Memorial Coach's Award" to recognise the player who is the most valuable during the season.
