= Winged Pharaoh =

1937 novel by Joan Grant

- First edition
- Author: Joan Grant
- Language: English
- Genre: Historical
- Publisher: Arthur Barker
- Publication date: 1937
- Publication place: United Kingdom
- Media type: Print (Hardback)
- Pages: 382
- ISBN: 1-58567-886-4

Winged Pharaoh is a historical novel by English writer Joan Grant, first published in 1937. Grant attributed the source of her information in this novel to her "Far Memory" extrasensory abilities, particularly the ability to remember her own past lives.

== Plot summary ==
The story is narrated by Sekhet-a-Ra, familiarly known as Sekeeta. Most of the story takes place in the city of 'Me'n-atetiss', Memphis, Egypt, founded by Sekeeta's ancestor 'Meniss' (Menes). In the course of the narrative, she becomes co-Pharaoh with her brother Neyah during the First Dynasty of Ancient Egypt. The narrative follows her life and training in the arts of war, statecraft, and metaphysics. All members of the royal family are routinely trained in the use of extrasensory abilities and taught a doctrine of esoteric discipline, reincarnation and karma. In the course of the story, she has an affair with a man named Dio from Minoas, and gives birth to a daughter she names Tchekeea, who becomes the fourth ruler of the First Dynasty, Den. Sekeeta rides a chariot into battle and engages in hand-to-hand combat to defend Egypt from invasion by the people of 'Zuma' (Sumer, which we are told is the land of the forerunners of the Babylonians), at the 'Amphitheatre of Grain', now the site of Tell el-Amarna. Sekeeta lives to an advanced age, dies, and is buried in Abidwa, the modern Abydos, Egypt. The name on her tomb is Meri-Nyet, her "priest name" which might be more properly rendered as Merneith.
