= Valentín Beperet =

Chilean footballer (1926-1989)

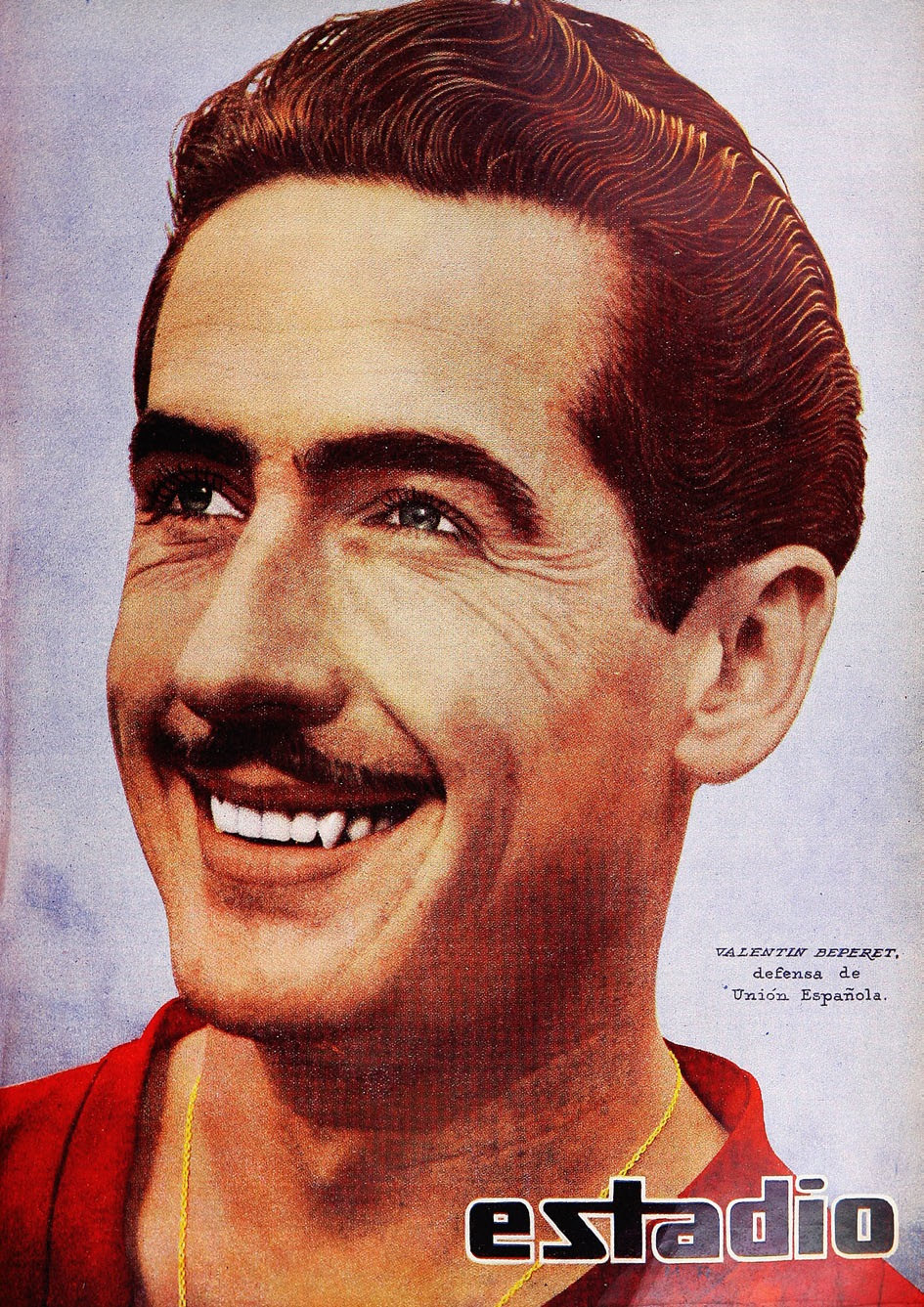

Personal information
- Full name: Valentín Antonio Beperet Madariaga
- Date of birth: 18 December 1926
- Place of birth: Santiago, Chile
- Date of death: 21 February 1989 (aged 62)
- Position: Left-back

Youth career
- Magallanes

Senior career*
Years	Team	Apps	(Gls)
1945–1946	Magallanes		
1947–1957	Unión Española		
1954	→ Universidad Católica (loan)		

International career
1953	Chile	1	(0)

Managerial career
- 1964: Municipal de Santiago
- 1965: Iberia-Puente Alto
- 1966: Municipal de Santiago
- * Club domestic league appearances and goals

Valentín Antonio Beperet Madariaga (18 December 1926 – 21 February 1989) was a Chilean footballer who played as a left-back.

== Career ==
A left-back, Beperet is a product of Magallanes youth system. At senior level, he played for Magallanes (1945–46) and Unión Española (1947–57). He was a member of the league title in 1951. He also made appearances for Universidad Católica in 1954.

He played in one match for the Chile national football team in 1953. He was also part of Chile's squad for the 1953 South American Championship.

After his retirement, he developed a coaching career, leading clubs such as Municipal de Santiago and Iberia-Puente Alto in the Chilean second division.

== Personal life ==
He was nicknamed Gaita (Bagpipes).

He had a friendship with the also footballer Aurelio Vásquez, to whom he nicknamed Toscano (Tuscan) like the Argentine actor Toscanito (Little Tuscan), who performed a goalkeeper in the 1948 film Pelota de trapo (Rag ball) what they had seen.

== Honours ==
Unión Española

- Primera División: 1951
