= Bemidji State Beavers football =

- First season: 1926; 100 years ago
- Athletic director: Britt Lauritsen
- Head coach: Brent Bolte; 8th season, 71–26 (.732)
- Location: Bemidji, Minnesota
- Stadium: Chet Anderson Stadium (capacity: 5000)
- NCAA division: Division II
- Conference: NSIC
- Colors: Green and white
- All-time record: 415–451–23 (.480)
- Bowl record: 1–1 (.500)

College Football Playoff appearances
- NCAA Div. II: 4 (2021, 2022, 2023, 2024)

Conference championships
- NSIC: 7 (1947, 1950, 1957, 1959, 2006, 2021, 2022)

Conference division championships
- NSIC North: 4 (2012, 2015, 2021, 2022)
- Website: Official website

The Bemidji State Beavers football team represents Bemidji State University, located in Bemidji, Minnesota college football. The Beavers, who began playing football in 1926, currently compete as members of the Northern Sun Intercollegiate Conference (NSIC) at the NCAA Division II level. Bemidji State's home games are played at Chet Anderson Stadium.

== Head coaching history ==
Bemidji State has had 16 coaches throughout the program's history. No games were played in 2020 due to the COVID–19 pandemic.

Seasons	Years	Coach	Wins	Losses	Ties	Win %
1926–1927	2	R. E. Mendenhall	6	5	1	.542
1928–1930	3	Eldon Mason	9	9	2	.500
1931–1934	4	Jack Sterrett	12	15	2	.448
1935–1937	3	R. B. Frost	7	14	1	.341
1938–1954	17	Hjalmer J. Erickson	53	55	5	.491
1955–1960, 1962–1965	10	Chester Anderson	43	34	5	.555
1961	1	John Kulbitski	3	6	0	.333
1966–1968	3	Don Palm	9	16	1	.360
1969–1973	5	Jim Malmquist	15	27	2	.364
1974	1	Larry Mortier	2	7	0	.222
1975–1977	3	Don Turner	14	15	0	.483
1978–1981	4	Sparky Adams	2	36	1	.064
1982–1988	7	John Peterson	30	40	3	.432
1989–1995	7	Kris Diaz	13	55	0	.191
1996–2015	20	Jeff Tesch	126	91	0	.581
2016–present	8	Brent Bolte	71	26	0	.732

== Championships ==
=== Conference championships ===
Bemidji State has won the Northern Sun Intercollegiate Conference championship seven times.

Year	Coach	Overall record	NSIC record
1947†	Hjalmer J. Erickson	4–3	3–1
1950†	Hjalmer J. Erickson	5–1–1	3–0–1
1957†	Chester Anderson	4–4	3–1
1959†	Chester Anderson	6–1–1	4–1
2006	Jeff Tesch	9–3	8–0
2021†	Brent Bolte	10–3	9–2
2022†	Brent Bolte	10–3	9–2

† Co-champions

=== Division championships ===
Bemidji State has won the NSIC North division championship four times.

Year	Coach	Overall record	NSIC record	Division record
2012†	Jeff Tesch	7–4	7–4	6–1
2015†	Jeff Tesch	7–4	7–4	6–1
2021	Brent Bolte	10–3	9–2	6–0
2022	Brent Bolte	10–3	9–2	6–0

† Co-champions

== Postseason ==
=== Bowl games ===
Bemidiji State has played in the Mineral Water Bowl twice and have a 1–1 record.

Year	Bowl	Coach	Opponent	Result	Record
2006	Mineral Water Bowl	Jeff Tesch	Pittsburg State	L 27–35	9–3
2016	Mineral Water Bowl	Brent Bolte	Washburn	W 36–23	9–3

=== NCAA Division II playoffs ===
Bemidiji State has made four appearances in the NCAA Division II football championship playoffs and have a 5–4 record.

Year	Round	Opponent	Result	Record
2021	First Round	Augustana (SD)	W 28–24	10–3
2021	Second Round	Colorado Mines	L 6–55	10–3
2022	First Round	Winona State	W 31–7	10–3
2022	Second Round	Angelo State	L 7–33	10–3
2023	First Round	Texas–Permian Basin	W 10–3	9–3
2023	Second Round	Central Washington	L 17–21	9–3
2024	First Round	Angelo State	W 24–14	10–4
2024	Second Round	Western Colorado	W 20–19	10–4
2024	Quarterfinals	Minnesota State	L 23–27	10–4

== Notable former players ==
- Trent Baalke, NFL executive and former general manager for the San Francisco 49ers and Jacksonville Jaguars.
- Dhel Duncan-Busby, CFL player for the Saskatchewan Roughriders.
- Brian Leonhardt, NFL player for the Oakland Raiders.
- Gunner Olszewski, NFL player most notably with the New England Patriots, First Team All-Pro (2020).
- John Redebaugh, Drafted by the Cleveland Browns in the 1970 NFL draft.
- Dean Widseth, Drafted by the Chicago Bears in the 1946 NFL draft.
- Al Wolden, NFL player for the Chicago Bears.
