= Paulaseer =

Indian preacher

Paulaseer Lawrie Muthukrishna (Lahari Krishna)
- Born: 24 February 1921; Munnar, Kerala, India
- Died: 24 February 1989 (aged 68)
- Resting place: Manujothi Ashram, Tirunelveli, Tamil Nadu, India
- Other names: Gurudev Shri Lahari Krishna, Ayyah (Refers father in Tamil language)
- Occupation: Religious leader
- Employer(s): The Galaha Co (Ceylon), Harrisons & Crossfield (Ceylon), Vellore Medical College Hospital (Vellore)
- Known for: Faith healing
- Spouse: Ebenezer Natchathram Lawrie
- Website: , , , ,

Notes
- Kalki Jeyanthi (Day of Vishwaroopa): 21 July 1969

Paulaseer Lawrie Muthukrishna (24 February 1921 – 24 February 1989); was an Indian preacher who had followers worldwide. He is known for his faith-healing movement and initiated the "One God, One Nation movement" in India. He was a follower and promoter of the teachings of William Branham.

== Early life, education and early career ==
R. Paulaseer Lawrie was born to father, Deva Rasiah, and mother, Nesammal, at the Lakshmi Tea Estate in present-day Munnar, Kerala, India.

Soon after his birth, the family moved to British Ceylon (now Sri Lanka). Paulaseer stayed back to study at St. John's College, located in Palayamkottai in Madras Province (now in Tamil Nadu). After finishing the intermediate class of university studies, he went to Ceylon and studied commercial subjects for one year. He then went to Wesley College, Colombo to gain the London Matric certificate.

After this, he went back to Madras, and joined the Madras Christian College for a Bachelor of Arts degree. As World War II began, a vigorous recruiting for officers was afoot. Paulaseer wanted to join the Indian Army and took some training. On knowing this, his father came over and forced Paulaseer to return with him to Ceylon. Paulaseer came back to India to continue his studies. He got a seat in St. Xavier's College, located in Palayamkottai, Tamil Nadu.

In August 1942, when the national leaders launched the Quit India Movement, he organized a big student strike in his college. The police attempted to apprehend him, but he managed to escape to Ceylon where, soon after arrival, he got a job in one of the tea estates as a stenographer. Around this time Paulaseer began to read political and religious works and to have visions. In 1946, he went to India on a short holiday. While going with his mother to a friend's house, he saw everything according to the dreams he had had about his wife-to-be. Thus assured that the girl in that house was the one chosen by the Lord, he consented to marry, and they were engaged. His mother was there, but his father was in Ceylon. So the marriage had to be postponed for six months; it occurred 26 May 1947.

When his first child was seriously ill, Paulaseer prayed and promised to devote his life to God if the child recovered. After his son's recovery, he resigned his job in Ceylon and returned to India. He took a job on the Yercaud Estate, located in Tamil Nadu, and later at the Christian Medical College Hospital, (CMCH) located in Vellore, Tamil Nadu.

== Evangelical career ==
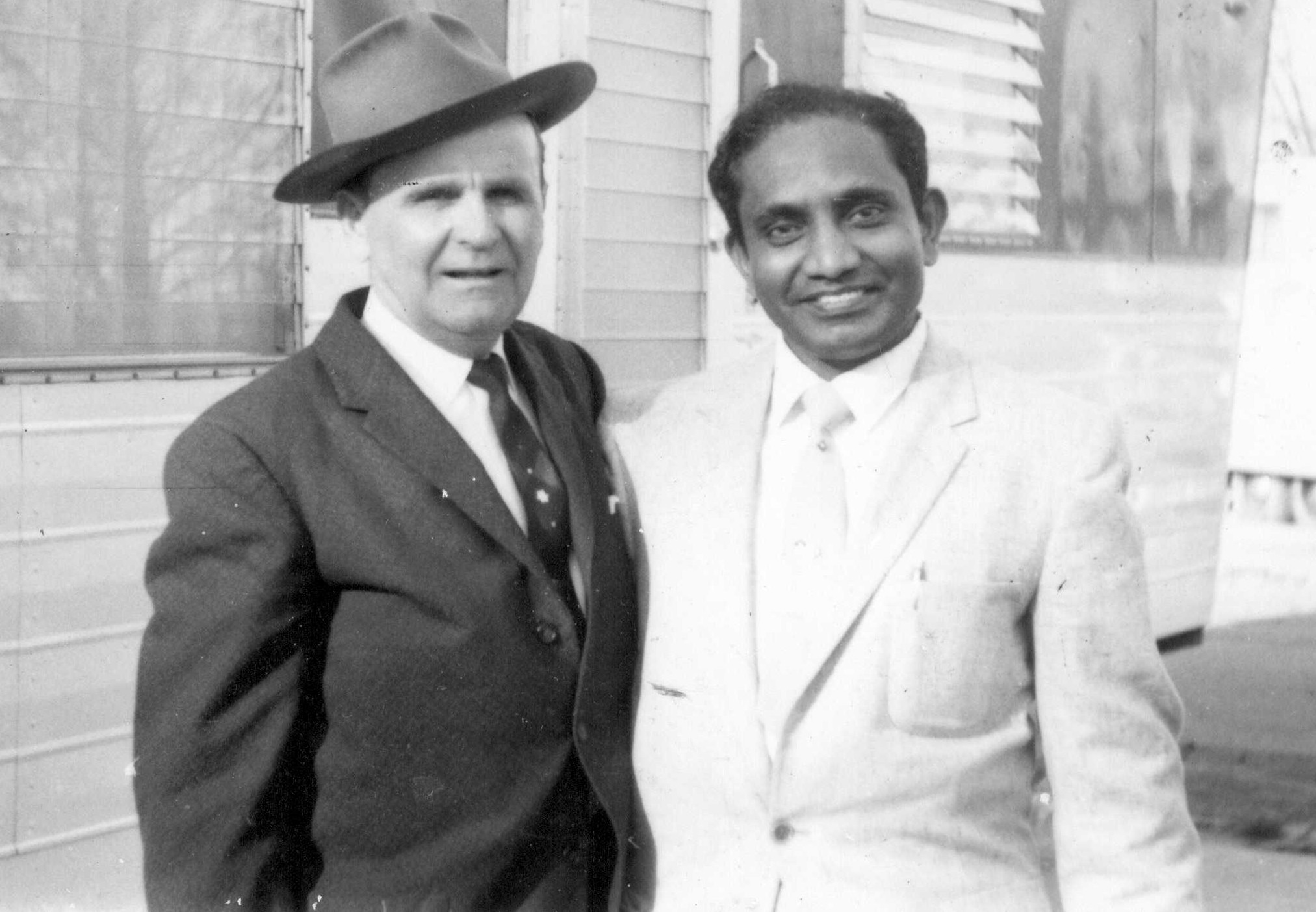
Paulaseer (right) with American evangelist William M. Branham (unknown date).

In response to more visions, Paulaseer resigned his job in 1953 in order to preach. He participated in a Bombay healing crusade of American evangelist William M. Branham in 1954, an acquaintance that was to be important later. A series of "miracles" sparked interest in Paulaseer's message. After preaching in various towns in South India, he crossed over to Ceylon on two missionary journeys. The first tour lasted from 25 October 1955 to 20 December 1955. The second longer tour was from 8 April 1956 until 17 June 1956.

After several years of evangelizing in India, Paulaseer was invited to an international conference in Scotland. From Scotland he went to the United States, where he attempted to acquire backing from an established Pentecostal ministry. This was largely unsuccessful until he met with Branham, who encouraged him in his ministry.

In 1960s, his group gave refuge to the expelled CPM/TPM leader Alwin R. De Alwis. Together they conducted meetings in Vepery, Chennai. Later on when Alwin R. De Alvis started exercising authority over the entire group, Paulaseer left the group and started a new gathering of his followers in a larger hall called Jubilee Hall.

In 1967, Paulaseer took a long journey in the West, preaching to many of Branham's followers. In 1969 he took another tour, and this time some Branhamites experienced extraordinary things from his preaching. On 21 July 1969 – the day of the Apollo 11 Moon landing – Paulaseer claimed to have become the second coming of Christ. His followers pointed to Branham's sermons to show that he recognized Paulaseer as such. Paulaseer adopted from Branham a prediction that the Rapture would occur in 1977, and that only 700 would be saved.

In the 1980s, Paulaseer changed his message somewhat, teaching Aadhi Bali or "Supreme Sacrifice" – an idea from the Purusasukta. He began to draw much more on Hindu and even Muslim ideas, and attracted more native Indian followers.

== See also ==
- List of 20th-century religious leaders
- List of people from Kerala
- List of people from Tamil Nadu
- List of Protestant missionaries in India
