= Gordon Kramer =

Australian rules footballer

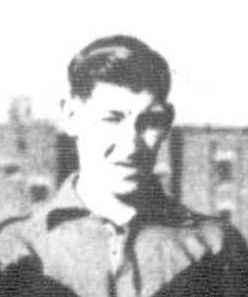

Personal information
- Full name: Gordon Charles Kramer
- Born: 4 November 1921
- Died: 12 February 1989 (aged 67)
- Original team: Box Hill
- Height: 188 cm (6 ft 2 in)
- Weight: 80 kg (176 lb)

Playing career^{1}
Years	Club	Games (Goals)
1942, 1944–45	Melbourne	23 (2)
- ^{1} Playing statistics correct to the end of 1945.

Gordon Charles Kramer (4 November 1921 – 12 February 1989) was an Australian rules footballer who played with Melbourne in the Victorian Football League (VFL).
