= Per Dahl (ice hockey) =

Norwegian ice hockey player

Personal information
- Nationality: Norwegian
- Born: 21 March 1916 Bærum, Norway
- Died: 17 February 1989 (aged 72)

Sport
- Sport: Ice hockey

Per Henry Dahl (21 March 1916 – 17 February 1989), nicknamed Peddal, was a Norwegian ice hockey player.

He was born in Høvik in Bærum, Norway and represented the club Bærum SK. He played for the Norwegian national ice hockey team, and competed at the 1952 Winter Olympics in Oslo.
