= Skippy Scheib =

American football player (1903–1989)

Profile
- Position: Center

Personal information
- Born: July 28, 1903; Saginaw, Michigan
- Died: July 28, 1989 (aged 86); Saginaw, Michigan
- Listed height: 6 ft 2 in (1.88 m)
- Listed weight: 210 lb (95 kg)

Career information
- High school: Arthur Hill (MI)
- College: West Virginia Wesleyan; Washington University

Career history
- Brooklyn Dodgers (1930)
- Stats at Pro Football Reference

Lee Raymond "Skippy" Scheib (July 28, 1903 – February 27, 1989) was an American football player.

A native of Saginaw, Michigan, he attended Arthur Hill High School. He then played college football as a center for West Virginia Wesleyan and Washington University in St. Louis. He was the captain of the 1928 Washington University Bears football team.

Scheib later played in the National Football League (NFL) as a center for the Brooklyn Dodgers. He appeared in six NFL games during the 1930 season, all as a starter.

He died in Saginaw in 1989 at age 86.
