= Joan Grant =

English author (1907–1989)

- Born: 12 April 1907; London, England
- Died: 3 February 1989 (aged 81); Kryvyi Rih, Ukrainian SSR, Soviet Union
- Resting place: Nunhead Cemetery, London, England
- Spouses: Leslie Grant (m. 1927) Charles Beatty (m. 1940) Denys Kelsey (m. 1960)
- Writing career
- Pen name: Joan M. Grant and Joan Marshall Grant
- Language: English
- Notable work: Winged Pharaoh

Joan Marshall Grant Kelsey (London, 12 April 1907 – 3 February 1989) was an English writer of historical novels and a reincarnationist.

== Life ==
Joan Marshall was born on 12 April 1907, in London, daughter of John Frederick Marshall and Blanche Emily Hughes. Joan Marshall's father, a wealthy man, was of dual US-British nationality—a prizewinning tennis player who at one point won his place in the semi-finals of the World Championship for each country, and thus needed to play against himself. A serious amateur entomologist, he also carried out at his own expense valuable pioneering work on the Anopheles mosquito for which purpose he had installed a full research unit on Hayling Island.

Joan Marshall spent her early years on Hayling Island in Hampshire. She remembered being a lively, determined girl. She was trained in ballet, until an injury ended the pursuit. She learned tennis, and as a young woman won the Hampshire Ladies Golf finals, claiming she had never before played golf. She also described herself as an excellent, and risk-taking, horsewoman.

Joan said that she learned aspects of science by assisting her father with his entomological research. H. G. Wells was a friend of Joan's father whom Joan remembered as an admirer and sometime mentor. Joan described her mother as having had second-sight visions. Joan herself said she experienced parapsychological phenomena from young girlhood, and her sensitivity was recognized not only by herself but by friends, who often told her it was eerie.

Despite being raised in genteel circumstances, Joan adapted to periods of material deprivation and significant disruption during her years in Iraq.

She married Leslie Grant on 30 November 1927. Leslie Grant had studied for a career in law, but became excited by the opportunity to join an archaeological dig as a photographer at Tel Asmar in Iraq. Joan joined him there, later remembering temperature extremes and violent dust storms under remote and starkly primitive conditions. During their return journey to England, Leslie and Joan spent 25 days in Egypt. Joan later regretted that on this, her only visit to Egypt, she had no idea she had lived there in her previous incarnations, this knowledge only coming to her a few years later.

Joan married Charles Beatty on 14 March 1940 (however, she retained the name "Joan Grant" as her nom de plume). Beatty was also a writer, first manager of the Montague Motor Museum in Beaulieu and one of the first announcers on Radio Luxembourg. He transcribed some of Joan Grant's earlier books from a wire voice recorder.

Joan married Denys Kelsey on 1 September 1960. Denys Kelsey had had a career as a practising psychiatrist. In the course of his work Kelsey had come to believe in a human soul. He used hypnosis when working with patients. Joan apparently convinced him to believe in Reincarnation and in her psychic abilities. Apparently he would sometimes ask her to use her paranormal gifts to help in the analysis of especially challenging psychological and psychosomatic clients.

== Novels ==
Her first and most famous novel was Winged Pharaoh (1937). Grant shot to unexpected fame upon publication. The New York Times hailed it as "A book of fine idealism, deep compassion and a spiritual quality pure and bright as flame", a sentiment echoed in reviews published elsewhere in the world. What her readers did not officially know, for almost another twenty years, was that Joan claimed to have recalled the events in Winged Pharaoh while in a hypnotic or trance-like state, dictating piecemeal the lifetime that she believed herself to have lived. The book is still considered a cult classic in so-called New Age literature. It was followed by other historical fantasies, or as Grant called them, "Far Memory books," or "previous life autobiographies".

Winged Pharaoh was initially accepted as a novel. Grant was consciously aware of many details of Egyptian history, having accompanied her first husband on his Egyptian expeditions. Occultists embraced it as an autobiography of a previous existence. Historians claimed inter alia that the calendar used in the book had never existed and also that there was no evidence whatsoever for the existence of an "avenue of trees" referred to in the book. Supposedly, after World War II a text was found which, when translated, proved to be the calendar referred to by Grant in the 1937 book. Grant's later novel, Lord of the Horizon (1943) was set in Egypt during the reign of the Pharaoh Amenemhat I.

== Reincarnationism ==
Grant believed she had been reincarnated at least forty times and that her far memory of past lives provided her the base material for her historical novels. She strove to disabuse herself and her readers of preconceptions, to eschew what she called 'group-think'. She was not interested in blind faith and blind belief, but in what could be perceived as true by the five senses. She claimed to have an unusual gift of "far memory" – the ability to remember previous lives, and something she referred to as "sensory awareness". She said that she experienced many realities that are not available to most people.

A collection of previously unknown writings by Grant was published as Speaking from the Heart: Ethics, Reincarnation & What it Means to Be Human in 2007 by Overlook Press in the United States and Duckworth Press in the UK. It was edited by her granddaughter Nicola Bennett, with anthologist Jane Lahr and Joan's closest friend Sophia Rosoff. The book contains poetry, essays and a series of lectures she gave at Edgar Cayce's Association for Research and Enlightenment in Virginia Beach. She had a reputation for talking and writing with clear certainty about her belief in other realities, past lives, and death. She said that for her, the veil between the "worlds" simply did not exist.

With her third husband, Denys Kelsey, she wrote Many Lifetimes, in which she explained how she supposedly remembered her own and others' past lives. A description of their inept and cranky attempts to treat the writer Heathcote Williams appears in the memoir Featherhood by Charlie Gilmour.

She also wrote several children's books which contain stories she claimed she was told in past lives. Some of her books were published under the names Joan M. Grant and Joan Marshall Grant.

Her books have been translated and published in many languages.

== Bibliography ==
- Winged Pharaoh (1937)
- Life As Carola (26 October 1939)
- Eyes of Horus (1942)
- The Scarlet Fish (1942)
- Lord of the Horizon (3 June 1943)
- Redskin Morning and Other Stories (1944)
- Scarlet Feather (1945)
- Return To Elysium (1947)
- Vague Vacation (1947)
- The Laird and the Lady (1949)
- So Moses Was Born (1952)
- Time Out of Mind (1956)
- Far Memory (1956)
- A Lot To Remember (1962)
- Many Lifetimes (1968)
- Speaking from the Heart (2007)
