= Alton C. Parker =

Canadian police officer

Alton C. Parker CM OMC (July 3, 1907 – February 28, 1989) was a Canadian police officer who became the first black Canadian detective. A native of Windsor, Ontario, he entered the Windsor Police Service in September 1942 as a constable. After a 28-year career and various volunteer positions, he received several honours, including the Order of Canada.

== Early life ==
Alton C. Parker was born in Windsor, Ontario, on July 3, 1907, where he remained for the rest of his life. A mechanic by trade, he worked as a foreman at a used car dealership. He was also president of the Central Citizens Association, a group organized to (among other things) employ black people in Windsor's public services. He was the most qualified candidate to enter the police force.

== Career ==
On September 1, 1942, Parker was hired by the Windsor Police Service as a constable. His appointment met some resistance before his professional demeanor swayed those fellow officers. On July 28, 1951, he was promoted by Chief Constable Farrow to become Canada's first black detective. He was a founding member of Apartment Living for Physically Handicapped Adults (ALPHA). In the 1960s, he became a director of Goodwill Industries and hosted an annual children's event at Broadhead Park, a site renamed in his honor in 1976.

== Later life and death ==
Parker retired on December 30, 1970. In 1976, he was appointed to the Order of Canada. He also received the Ontario Medal for Good Citizenship and the Queen Elizabeth II Silver Jubilee Medal.

Parker died on February 28, 1989, aged 81; his funeral service attracted such a large crowd that loudspeakers and radio carried the speeches to many listeners.
