= Bemidji State Beavers =

Athletic teams of Bemidji State University

- University: Bemidji State University
- Nickname: Beavers
- NCAA: Division II (primary); Division I (ice hockey)
- Conference: NSIC (primary); CCHA (men's ice hockey); WCHA (women's ice hockey)
- Athletic director: Britt Lauritsen
- Location: Bemidji, Minnesota
- Varsity teams: 14 (5 men's, 9 women's)
- Football stadium: Chet Anderson Stadium
- Basketball arena: BSU Gymnasium
- Ice hockey arena: Sanford Center
- Baseball stadium: BSU Baseball Field
- Soccer stadium: Chet Anderson stadium
- Colors: Green and white
- Website: bsubeavers.com
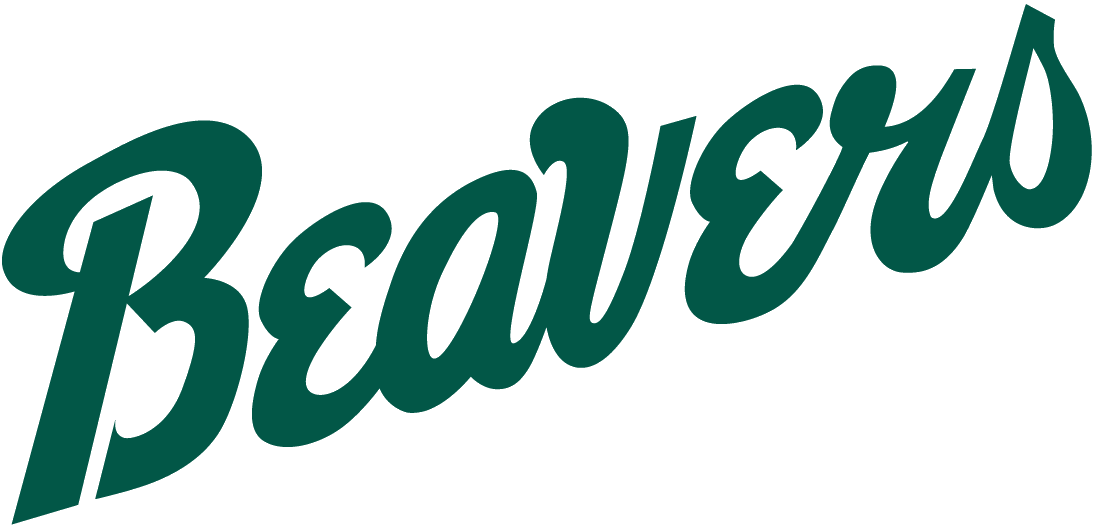

The Bemidji State Beavers are the athletic teams that represent Bemidji State University, located in Bemidji, Minnesota, in NCAA Division II intercollegiate sports. The Beavers compete as members of the Northern Sun Intercollegiate Conference for all 14 varsity sports with the exceptions of men's and women's ice hockey, which respectively compete as members of the Central Collegiate Hockey Association (CCHA) and Western Collegiate Hockey Association (WCHA).

== Varsity ==
=== List of teams ===
Men's sports

- Baseball
- Basketball
- Football
- Golf
- Ice Hockey

Women's sports

- Basketball
- Cross Country
- Golf
- Ice Hockey
- Soccer
- Softball
- Tennis
- Track & Field
- Volleyball

== Individual sports ==
=== Ice hockey ===
The men's hockey team is one of seven teams that left the men's division of the WCHA after the 2020–21 season to reestablish the CCHA, whose original version had disbanded after the 2012–13 season. This move in turn led to the demise of the WCHA men's division. Before joining the WCHA in 2010–11, the Beavers had been members of College Hockey America. The women's hockey team competes in the WCHA, now a women-only league. The men's ice hockey team qualified for the 2009 NCAA Division I Men's Ice Hockey Tournament. The team defeated number one seed Notre Dame in a first round upset. The team later defeated Cornell to advance to its first Division I Frozen Four appearance, but then lost to Miami University in the semifinals.

=== Track and field ===
As of May 2011, the Men's Track and Field Program will be discontinued due to future budget constraints.

== Alumni ==
- Matt Climie, NHL goaltender
- Brad Hunt, NHL left wing
- Andrew Murray, NHL center
- Gunner Olszewski, NFL wide receiver
- Joel Otto, NHL center
- Matt Read, NHL center

== Gallery ==
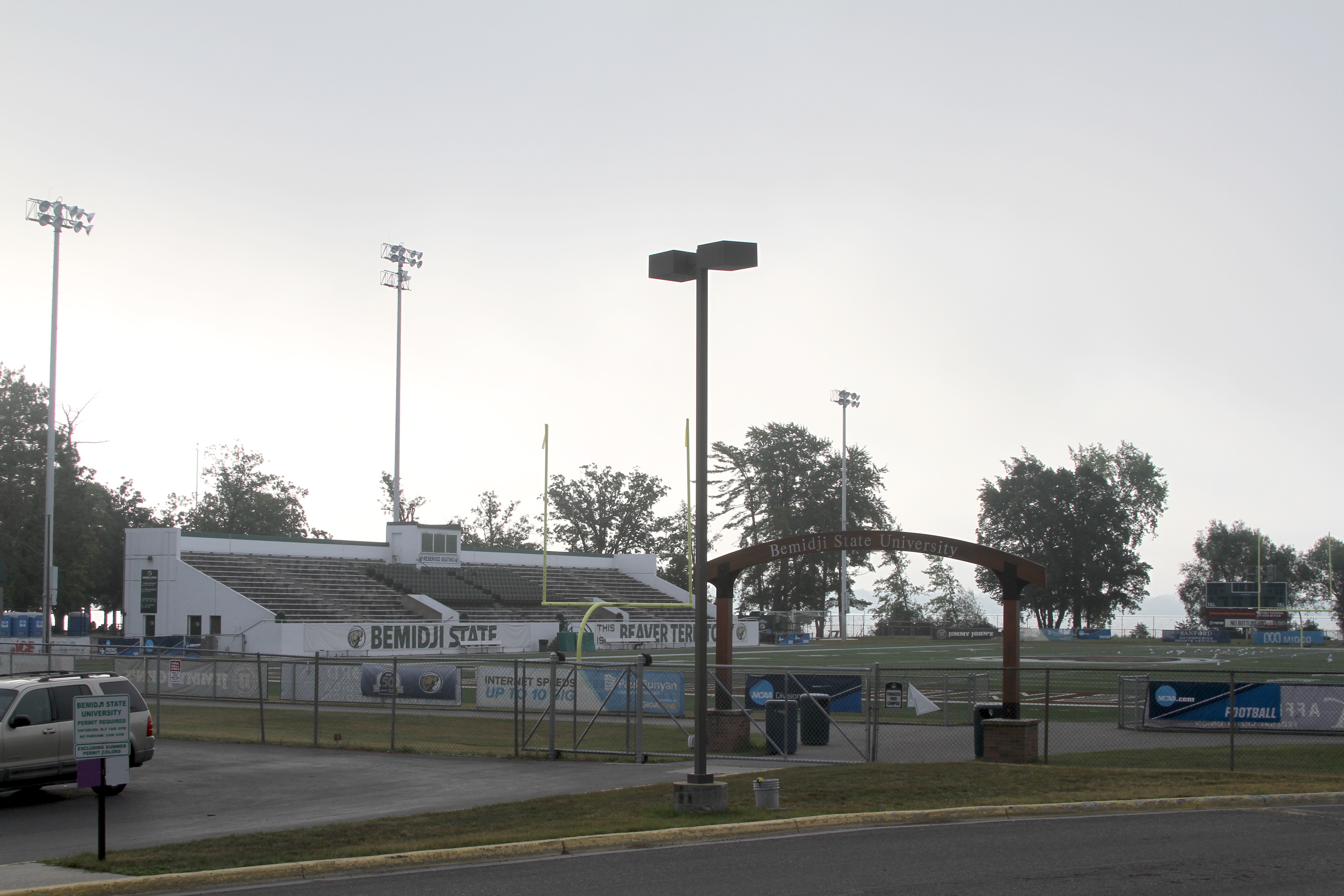
Chet Anderson Stadium

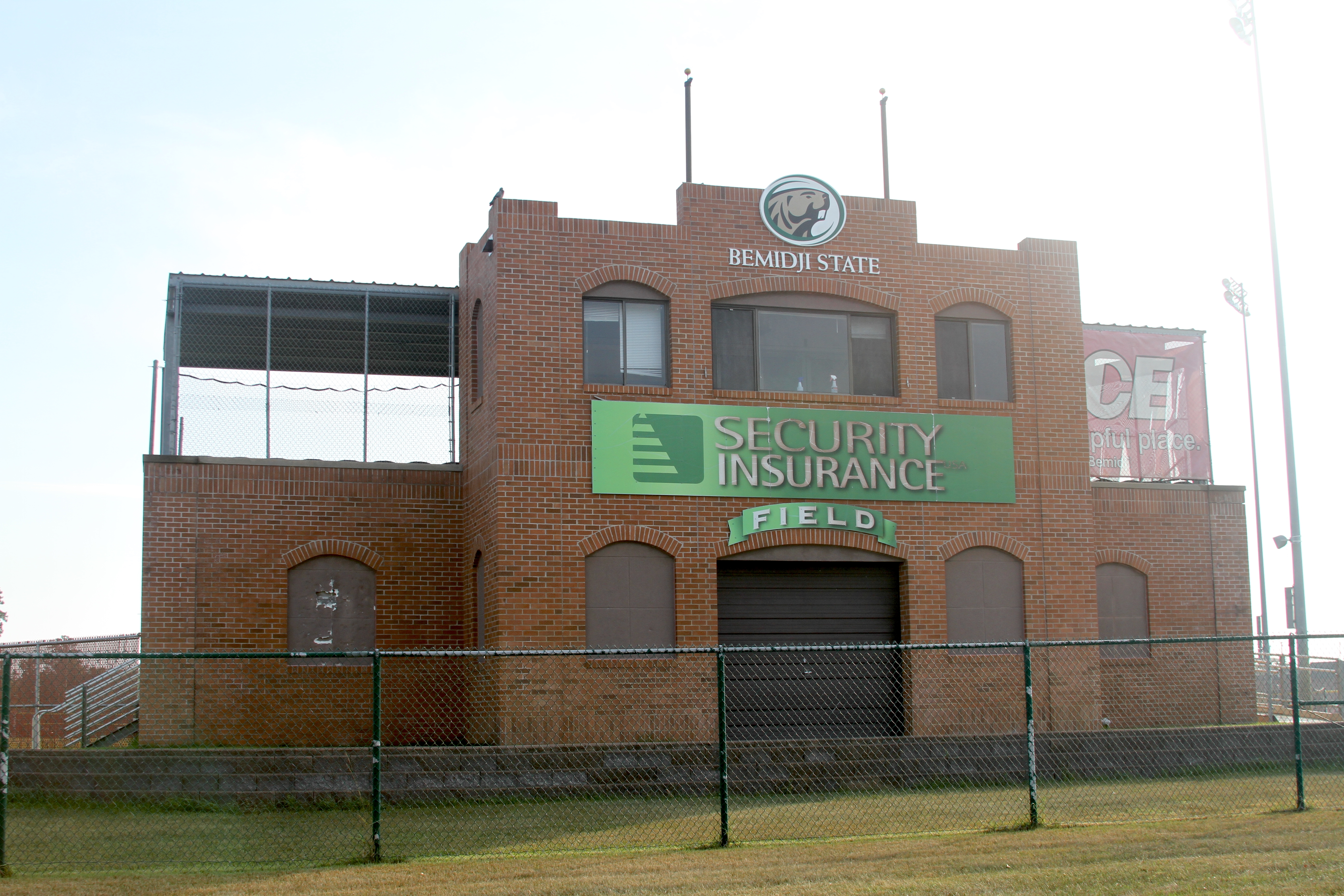
Baseball field Grandstand

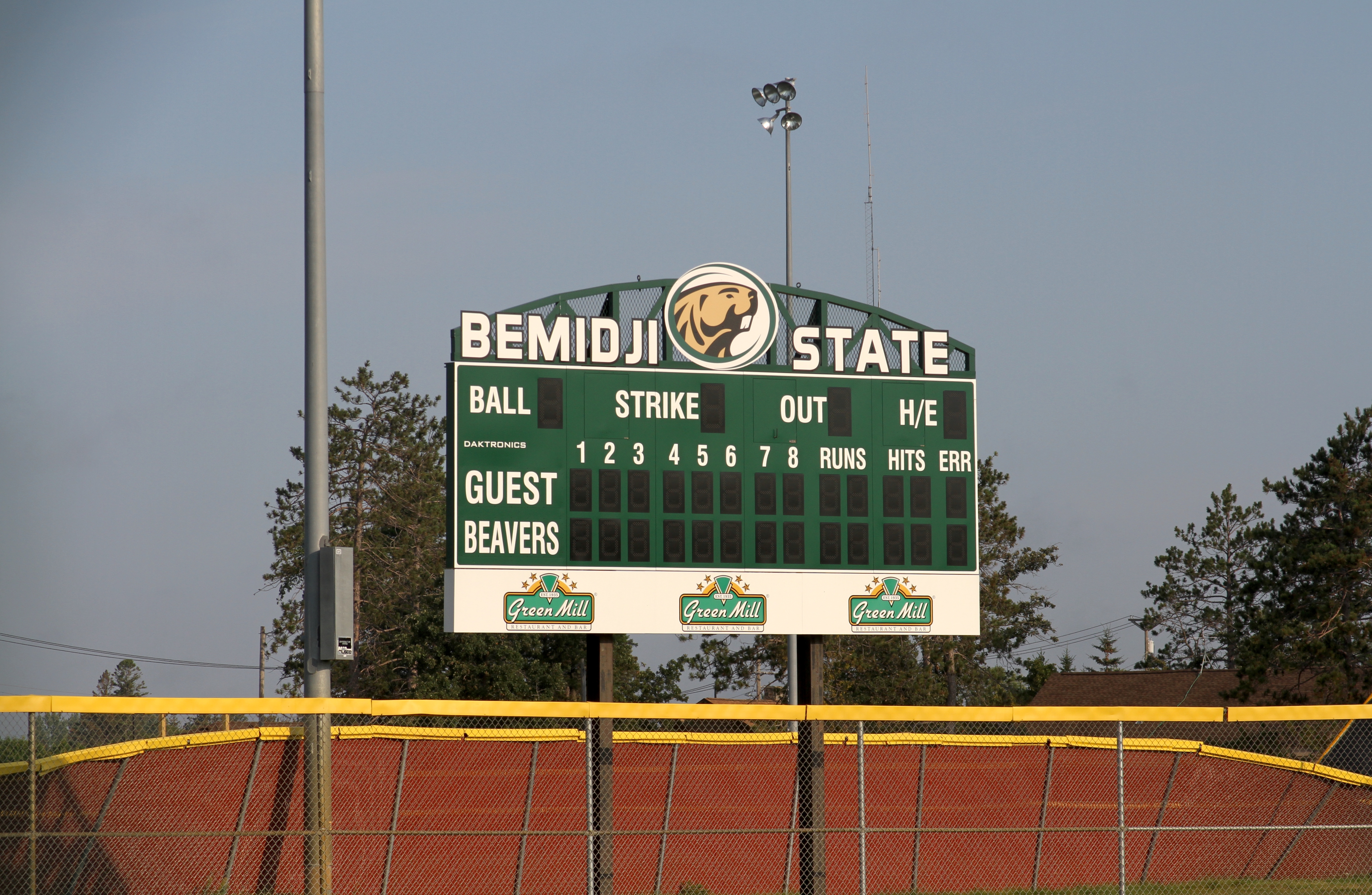
Baseball field scoreboard

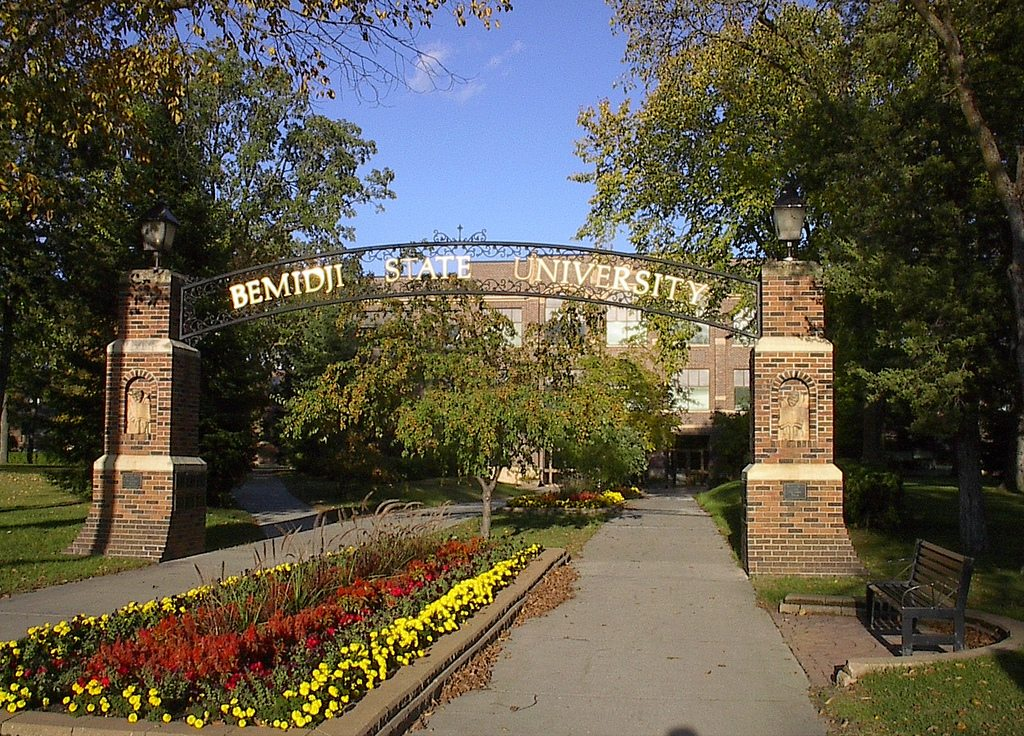
Alumni Arch
