= 1946 Wisconsin State Teachers College Conference football season =

- Sport: Football
- Teams: 10

Football seasons

1946 Wisconsin State Teachers College Conference football standings
	Conf.					Overall
Team	W		L		T	W		L		T
Northern Division
Superior State x	1	–	0	–	3	2	–	1	–	3
River Falls State	2	–	1	–	1	4	–	2	–	2
Stout Institute	1	–	1	–	2	2	–	2	–	2
Eau Claire State	1	–	2	–	1	3	–	2	–	2
La Crosse State	1	–	2	–	1	2	–	4	–	1
Southern Division
Stevens Point State x	3	–	1	–	0	3	–	2	–	1
Milwaukee State x	3	–	1	–	0	3	–	3	–	1
Oshkosh State	2	–	2	–	0	2	–	4	–	0
Platteville State	2	–	2	–	0	2	–	2	–	0
Whitewater State	0	–	4	–	0	0	–	6	–	0
x – Division champion/co-champions

The 1946 Wisconsin State Teachers College Conference football season was the season of college football played by the member schools of the Wisconsin State Teachers College Conference (WSTCC) as part of the 1946 college football season. The conference had existed since 1913 and, during the 1946, was divided into Northern and Southern Divisions. Superior State, led by head coach Ted Whereatt, won the Northern Division championship and compiled an overall record of 2–1–3. Two teams tied for the Southern Division championship: Stevens Point State, coached by George Berg to a 3–2–1 record; and Milwaukee State, coached by Herman Kluge to a 3–3–1 record. Milwaukee State had both the best offensive and defensive records in the conference.

== Conference overview ==
=== Northern Division ===
Conf. rank	Team	Head coach	Conf. record	Overall record	Points scored	Points against
1	Superior State	Ted Whereatt	1–0–3	2–1–3	71	46
2	River Falls State	George Schlagenhauf	2–1–1	4–2–2	96	69
3	Stout Institute	Ray C. Johnson	1–1–2	2–2–2	47	77
4	Eau Claire State	Cliff Fagan	1–2–1	3–2–2	92	42
5	La Crosse State	Clyde B. Smith	1–2–1	2–4–1	51	77

=== Southern Division ===
Conf. rank	Team	Head coach	Conf. record	Overall record	Points scored	Points against
1	Stevens Point State	George Berg	3–1	3–2–1	64	108
1	Milwaukee State	Herman Kluge	3–1	3–3–1	102	80
3	Platteville State	Lester Leitl	2–2	2–2	32	38
3	Oshkosh State	Robert Kolf	2–2	2–4	41	105
5	Whitewater State	Ed Schwager	0–5	0–6	39	98

== Northern Division teams ==
=== Superior State ===
1946 Superior State Yellowjackets football

WSTCC Northern Division champion
- Conference: Wisconsin State Teachers College Conference
- Northern Division
- Record: 2–1–3 (1–0–3 WSTCC)
- Head coach: Ted Whereatt (1st season)

The 1946 Superior State Yellowjackets football team represented Superior State Teachers College (now known as University of Wisconsin–Superior) in the Wisconsin State Teachers College Conference (WSTCC) during the 1946 college football season. Led by head coach Ted Whereatt, the Yellowjackets compiled a 2–1–3 record (1–0–3 against WSTCC opponents, won the WSTCC Northern Division championship, and outscored opponents by a total of 71 to 46.

Date	Opponent	Site	Result	Source
September 27	Mankato State*	Superior, WI	L 12–14	
October 4	La Crosse State	Superior, WI	W 20–0	
October 10	Eau Claire State	Carson Park; Eau Claire, WI	T 6–6	
October 19	at Stout Institute	Menomonie, WI	T 13–13	
October 25	River Falls State		T 7–7	
November 2	Duluth State*		W 13–6	
*Non-conference game

=== River Falls State ===
1946 River Falls State Falcons football
- Conference: Wisconsin State Teachers College Conference
- Northern Division
- Record: 4–2–2 (2–1–1 WSTCC)
- Head coach: George Schlagenhauf (2nd season)

The 1946 River Falls Falcons football team represented River Falls State Teachers College (now known as University of Wisconsin–River Falls) in the Wisconsin State Teachers College Conference (WSTCC) during the 1946 college football season. Led by head coach George Schlagenhauf, the Falcons compiled a 4–2–2 record (2–1–1 against WSTCC opponents), placed second in the WSTCC Northern Division, and outscored opponents by a total of 96 to 69.

Date	Opponent	Site	Result	Source
September 21	at St. Olaf*	Northfield, MN	L 6–13	
September 27	St. Cloud*	River Falls, WI	W 12–6	
October 5	Stout Institute	River Falls, WI	W 20–0	
October 11	Northland*	River Falls, WI	W 26–0	
October 19	at Eau Claire	Carson Park; Eau Claire, WI	L 6–19	
October 25	at Superior State	Superior, WI	T 7–7	
November 2	La Crosse State	River Falls, WI	W 13–9	
November 8	Hamline*	River Falls, WI	T 6–6	
*Non-conference game

=== Stout Institute ===
1946 Stout Institute Blue Devils football
- Conference: Wisconsin State Teachers College Conference
- Northern Division
- Record: 2–2–2 (1–1–2 WSTCC)
- Head coach: Ray C. Johnson (2nd season)

The 1946 Stout Institute Blue Devils football team represented Stout Institute (now known as University of Wisconsin–Stout) in the Wisconsin State Teachers College Conference (WSTCC) during the 1946 college football season. Led by head coach Ray C. Johnson, the Blue Devils compiled a 2–2–2 record (1–1–2 against WSTCC opponents), finished third in the WSTCC Northern Division, and were outscored by a total of 77 to 47.

Date	Opponent	Site	Result	Source
September 28	at Carleton*	Northfield, MN	L 6–20	
October 5	at River Falls	River Falls, WI	L 0–20	
October 12	at La Crosse	La Crosse, WI	T 6–6	
October 19	Superior State	Menomonie, WI	T 13–13	
October 26	at Moorhead Teachers*	Moorhead, MN	W 15–12	
November 2	Eau Claire	Menomonie, WI	W 7–6	
*Non-conference game

=== Eau Claire State ===
1946 Eau Claire State Blugolds football
- Conference: Wisconsin State Teachers College Conference
- Northern Division
- Record: 3–2–2 (1–2–1 WSTCC)
- Head coach: Cliff Fagan (2nd season)
- Home stadium: Carson Park

The 1946 Eau Claire State Blugolds football team represented Eau Clarie State Teachers College (now known as University of Wisconsin–Eau Claire) in the Wisconsin State Teachers College Conference (WSTCC) during the 1946 college football season. Led by head coach Cliff Fagan, the Blugolds compiled a 3–2–2 record (1–2–1 against WSTCC opponents), placed fourth in the WSTCC Northern Division, and outscored opponents by a total of 92 to 42.

Date	Opponent	Site	Result	Source
September 28	Stevens Point	Carson Park; Eau Claire, WI	T 7–7	
October 5	Michigan Tech*	Carson Park; Eau Claire, WI	W 34–2	
October 10	Superior State	Carson Park; Eau Claire, WI	T 6–6	
October 19	River Falls^{†}	Carson Park; Eau Claire, WI	W 19–6	
October 26	Whitewater State	Whitewater, WI	W 20–6	
November 2	Stout Institute	Menomonie, WI	L 6–7	
November 9	at La Crosse State	La Crosse, WI	L 0–8	
*Non-conference game; ^{†}Homecoming

=== La Crosse State ===
1946 La Crosse State Indians football
- Conference: Wisconsin State Teachers College Conference
- Northern Division
- Record: 2–4–1 (1–2–1 WSTCC)
- Head coach: Clyde B. Smith (6th season)
- Home stadium: Memorial Field

The 1946 La Crosse State Indians football team represented Wisconsin State College–La Crosse (now known as University of Wisconsin–La Crosse) of La Crosse, Wisconsin. In their sixth year under head coach Clyde B. Smith, the Eagles compiled a 2–4–1 record (1–2–1 against WSCC opponents) and finished tied in fourth place in the WSCC.

Date	Opponent	Site	Result	Source
September 28	at St. Mary's (MN)*		L 0–6	
October 4	at Superior State	Superior, WI	L 0–20	
October 12	Stout Institute	LaCrosse, WI	T 6–6	
October 19	Milwaukee State	LaCrosse, WI	W 21–12	
October 26	at St. Norbert*	J. R. Minahan Stadium; De Pere, WI	L 7–20	
November 2	at River Falls State	River Falls, WI	L 9–13	
November 9	Eau Claire State	La Crosse, WI	W 8–0	
*Non-conference game

== Southern Division teams ==
=== Stevens Point State ===
1946 Stevens Point Pointers football

WSTCC Southern Division co-champion
- Conference: Wisconsin State Teachers College Conference
- Southern Division
- Record: 3–2–1 (3–1 WSTCC)
- Head coach: George Berg (3rd season)

The 1946 Stevens Point Pointers football team represented Central State Teachers College (now known as University of Wisconsin–Stevens Point) in the Wisconsin State Teachers College Conference (WSTCC) during the 1946 college football season. Led by head coach George Berg, the Pointers compiled a 3–2–1 record (3–1 against WSTCC opponents), tied for the WSTCC Southern Division championship, and were outscored by a total of 108 to 64.

Date	Opponent	Site	Result	Source
September 21	St. Norbert*	Stevens Point, WI	L 0–54	
September 28	at Eau Claire State	Carson Park; Eau Claire, WI	T 7–7	
October 5	at Oshkosh State	Oshkosh, WI	L 13–27	
October 12	Milwaukee State	Stevens Point, WI	W 12–6	
October 19	Whitewater State^{†}	Stevens Point, WI	W 25–14	
October 26	at Platteville State	Platteville, WI	W 7–0	
*Non-conference game; ^{†}Homecoming

=== Milwaukee State ===
1946 Milwaukee State Green Gulls football

WSTCC Southern Division co-champion
- Conference: Wisconsin State Teachers College Conference
- Southern Division
- Record: 3–3–1 (3–1 WSTCC)
- Head coach: Herman Kluge (14th season)

The 1946 Milwaukee State Green Gulls football team represented Wisconsin State Teachers College-Milwaukee (now known as University of Wisconsin–Milwaukee) in the Wisconsin State Teachers College Conference (WSTCC) during the 1946 college football season. Led by head coach Herman Kluge, the Green Gulls compiled a 3–3–1 record (3–1 against WSTCC opponents), tied for the WSTCC Southern Division championship, and outscored opponents by a total of 102 to 80.

Date	Opponent	Site	Result	Source
September 28	Carroll (WI)*		T 13–13	
October 5	at Whitewater State	Whitewater, WI	W 7–0	
October 12	at Stevens Point State	Stevens Point, WI	L 6–12	
October 19	at La Crosse State	La Crosse, WI	L 12–21	
October 26	Oshkosh State	Milwaukee, WI	W 40–0	
November 2	St. Norbert*	Pearse Field; Milwaukee, WI	L 0–22	
November 9	Platteville State	Milwaukee, WI	W 24–12	
*Non-conference game

=== Platteville State ===
1946 Platteville State Pioneers football
- Conference: Wisconsin State Teachers College Conference
- Southern Division
- Record: 2–2 (2–2 WSTCC)
- Head coach: Lester Leitl (1st season)

The 1946 Platteville State Pioneers football team represented Wisconsin State College–Platteville (now known as University of Wisconsin–Platteville) of Platteville, Wisconsin. In their first year under head coach Lester Leitl, the Pioneers compiled a 2–2 record (2–2 against WSTCC opponents) and tied for third place in the WSTCC Southern Division.

Date	Opponent	Site	Result	Source
October 12	Whitewater State	Whitewater, WI	W 13–7	
October 19	Oshkosh State^{†}	Platteville, WI	W 7–0	
October 26	at Stevens Point State	Platteville, WI	L 0–7	
November 9	at Milwaukee State	Milwaukee, WI	L 12–24	
^{†}Homecoming

=== Oshkosh State ===
1946 Oshkosh State Titans football
- Conference: Wisconsin State Teachers College Conference
- Southern Division
- Record: 2–4 (2–2 WSTCC)
- Head coach: Robert Kolf (14th season)

The 1946 Oshkosh State Titans football team represented Wisconsin State College–Oshkosh (now known as University of Wisconsin–Oshkosh) of Oshkosh, Wisconsin. In their 14th year under head coach Robert Kolf, the Titans compiled a 2–4 record (2–2 against WSTCC opponents) and tied for third place in second place in the WSTCC Southern Division.

Date	Opponent	Site	Result	Source
September 28	at Northern Michigan*	Marquette, MI	L 0–6	
October 5	Stevens Point	Oshkosh, WI	W 27–13	
October 12	St. Norbert*	Oshkosh, WI	L 0–39	
October 19	at Platteville State	Platteville, WI	L 0–7	
October 26	at Milwaukee State	Milwaukee, WI	L 0–40	
November 2	at Whitewater State	Whitewater, WI	W 14–0	
*Non-conference game

=== Whitewater State ===
1946 Whitewater State Quakers football
- Conference: Wisconsin State Teachers College Conference
- Southern Division
- Record: 0–6 (0–5 WSTCC)
- Head coach: Ed Schwager (1st season)

The 1946 Whitewater State Quakers football team represented Whitewater State Teachers College (now known as University of Wisconsin–Whitewater) in the Wisconsin State Teachers College Conference (WSTCC) during the 1946 college football season. Led by head coach Ed Schwager, the Quakers compiled an 0–6 record (0–5 against WSTCC opponents), finished last in the WSTCC Southern Division, and were outscored by a total of 98 to 39.

Date	Opponent	Site	Result	Attendance	Source
September 28	at St. Norbert*	De Pere, WI	L 12–19	2,300	
October 5	Milwaukee State	Whitewater, WI	L 0–7		
October 12	Platteville State	Whitewater, WI	L 6–13		
October 19	Stevens Point	Whitewater, WI	L 14–25		
October 26	Eau Claire State	Whitewater, WI	L 6–20		
November 2	at Oshkosh State	Oshkosh, WI	L 0–14		
*Non-conference game
