= 1961 Wisconsin State College Conference football season =

- Sport: Football
- Teams: 10
- Champion: Stevens Point State

Football seasons
- 1960 1962

1961 Wisconsin State College Conference football standings
	Conf.					Overall
Team	W		L		T	W		L		T
Stevens Point State $	7	–	1	–	0	8	–	1	–	0
La Crosse State	5	–	1	–	0	5	–	3	–	0
River Falls State	4	–	2	–	0	5	–	4	–	0
Whitewater State	3	–	3	–	0	6	–	3	–	0
Superior State	2	–	3	–	1	3	–	4	–	2
Stout State	2	–	3	–	1	3	–	4	–	1
Eau Claire State	3	–	5	–	0	4	–	5	–	0
Oshkosh State	2	–	4	–	0	2	–	4	–	0
Milwaukee	2	–	4	–	0	2	–	6	–	0
Platteville State	1	–	5	–	0	1	–	6	–	0
$ – Conference champion

The 1961 Wisconsin State College Conference football season was the season of college football played by the ten (10) member schools of the Wisconsin State College Conference (WSCC) as part of the 1961 college football season. Stevens Point, led by head coach Duaine Counsell, compiled an 8–1 record (7–1 against WSCC opponents) and won the WSCC championship.

== Teams ==
=== Stevens Point State ===
1961 Stevens Point Pointers football
- Conference: Wisconsin State College Conference
- Record: 8–1 (7–1 WSCC)
- Head coach: Duaine Counsell (5th season)
- Home stadium: Goerke Field

The 1961 Stevens Point Pointers football team represented Central State College at Stevens Point (now known as University of Wisconsin–Stevens Point) in the Wisconsin State College Conference (WSCC) during the 1961 college football season. In their fifth year under head coach Duaine Counsell, the Pointers compiled an 8–1 record (7–1 against WSCC opponents) and won the WSCC championship.

Date	Opponent	Site	Result	Attendance	Source
September 9	at Eau Claire State	Carson Park; Eau Claire, WI	W 38–13		
September 16	Lakeland*	Goerke Field; Stevens Point, WI	W 39–0		
September 23	at Oshkosh State	Oshkosh, WI	W 33–6		
October 2	Whitewater State	Goerke Field; Stevens Point, WI	W 20–3	> 3,000	
October 7	Stout State	Goerke Field; Stevens Point, WI	W 14–7		
October 14	Wisconsin-Milwaukee^{†}	Goerke Field; Stevens Point, WI	W 27–0		
October 21	at Platteville State	Platteville, WI	W 27–0		
October 28	at River Falls State	River Falls, WI	W 26–0		
November 4	at La Crosse State	Memorial Field; La Crosse, WI	L 14–22	3,000	
*Non-conference game; ^{†}Homecoming

=== La Crosse State ===
1961 La Crosse State Indians football
- Conference: Wisconsin State College Conference
- Record: 5–3 (5–1 WSCC)
- Head coach: Bill Vickroy (11th season)
- Home stadium: Memorial Field

The 1961 La Crosse State Indians football team represented Wisconsin State College–La Crosse (now known as University of Wisconsin–La Crosse) of La Crosse, Wisconsin. In their tenth year under head coach Bill Vickroy, the Eagles compiled a 5–3 record (5–1 against WSCC opponents) and finished in second place in the WSCC.

Date	Opponent	Site	Result	Attendance	Source
September 16	at St. Norbert*	West De Pere, WI	L 3–14	2,800	
September 23	at Stout State	Menomonie, WI	W 3–0		
September 30	Oshkosh		Cancelled		
October 7	at Whitewater State	Whitewater, WI	W 21–13		
October 14	River Falls State	Memorial Field; La Crosse, WI	W 33–7		
October 21	at Eau Claire State	Eau Claire, WI	L 13–20		
October 28	Superior State^{†}	Memorial Field; La Crosse, WI	W 40–13		
November 4	Stevens Point	Memorial Field; La Crosse, WI	W 22–14	3,000	
November 11	at Southern Illinois*	McAndrew Stadium; Carbondale, IL	L 13–47	8,000	
*Non-conference game; ^{†}Homecoming

=== River Falls State ===
1961 River Falls State Falcons football
- Conference: Wisconsin State College Conference
- Record: 5–4 (4–1 WSCC)
- Head coach: Fran Polsfoot (5th season)

The 1961 River Falls State Falcons football team represented River Falls State College (now known as University of Wisconsin–River Falls) in the Wisconsin State College Conference (WSCC) during the 1961 college football season. In their fifth and final year under head coach Fran Polsfoot, the Falcons compiled a 5–4 record (4–1 against WSCC opponents) and finished third in the WSCC.

Date	Opponent	Site	Result	Attendance	Source
September 9	Augsburg*	River Falls, WI	L 7–19		
September 16	Northland*	River Falls, WI	W 19–6		
September 22	at Superior State	Superior, WI	W 6–0		
September 30	Eau Claire State	River Falls, WI	W 7–6		
October 7	at Oshkosh State	Oshkosh, WI	W 12–6		
October 14	at La Crosse State	Memorial Field; La Crosse, WI	L 7–33		
October 21	Stout State	River Falls, WI	W 19–6		
October 28	Stevens Point	River Falls, WI	L 0–26		
November 4	at Winona State*	Winona, MN	L 7–31		
*Non-conference game

=== Whitewater State ===
1961 Whitewater State Warhawks football
- Conference: Wisconsin State College Conference
- Record: 6–3 (3–3 WSCC)
- Head coach: Forrest Perkins (16th season)

The 1961 Whitewater State Warhawks football team represented Whitewater State College (now known as University of Wisconsin–Whitewater) in the Wisconsin State College Conference (WSCC) during the 1961 college football season. In their sixth year under head coach Forrest Perkins, the Quakers compiled a 6–3 record (3–3 against WSCC opponents) and finished in fourth place in the WSCC.

Date	Opponent	Site	Result	Attendance	Source
September 16	Carroll (WI)*	Whitewater, WI	W 28–6		
September 23	Platteville State	Whitewater, WI	W 38–0		
October 2	at Stevens Point State	Goerke Field; Stevens Point, WI	L 3–20	> 3,000	
October 7	La Crosse State	Whitewater, WI	L 13–21		
October 14	at Oshkosh State	Oshkosh, WI	W 12–0		
October 21	at Superior State	Superior, WI	L 0–31		
October 28	Wisconsin-Milwaukee	Whitewater, WI	W 28–0		
November 4	St. Norbert*	Whitewater, WI	W 12–7		
November 11	at Arkansas State*	Kays Stadium; Jonesboro, AR	W 8–7		
*Non-conference game

=== Superior State ===
1961 Superior State Yellowjackets football
- Conference: Wisconsin State College Conference
- Record: 3–4–2 (2–3–1 WSCC)
- Head coach: Mertz Mortorelli (8th season)

The 1961 Superior State Yellowjackets football team represented Superior State College (now known as University of Wisconsin–Superior) in the Wisconsin State College Conference (WSCC) during the 1961 college football season. In their eighth year under head coach Mertz Mortorelli, the Yellowjackets compiled a 3–4–2 record (2–3–1 against WSCC opponents) and finished in a tie for fifth place in the WSCC.

Date	Opponent	Site	Result	Attendance	Source
September 9	at Minnesota–Duluth*	Duluth, MN	L 6–43	3,901	
September 16	Michigan Tech*	Superior, WI	T 0–0	1,500	
September 22	River Falls State	Superior, WI	L 0–6		
	Stout State		T 0–0		
October 7	at Milwaukee	Milwaukee, WI	W 14–0		
October 14	at Eau Claire State	Eau Claire, WI	L 14–34		
October 21	Whitewater State	Superior, WI	W 31–0		
October 28	at La Crosse State	Memorial Field; La Crosse, WI	L 13–40		
	Bemidji State*		W 13–9		
*Non-conference game

=== Stout State ===
1961 Stout State Blue Devils football
- Conference: Wisconsin State College Conference
- Record: 3–4–1 (2–3–1 WSCC)
- Head coach: Bob Bostwick (4th season)

The 1961 Stout State Blue Devils football team represented Stout State College (now known as University of Wisconsin–Stout) in the Wisconsin State College Conference (WSCC) during the 1961 college football season. In their fourth year under head coach Bob Bostwick, the Blue Devils compiled a 3–4–1 record (2–3–1 against WSCC opponents) and finished in a tie for fifth place in the WSCC.

Date	Opponent	Site	Result	Attendance	Source
	Winona State*		L 0–12		
	St. Cloud State*		W 19–6		
September 23	La Crosse State	Menomonie, WI	L 0–3		
	Superior State		T 0–0		
October 7	at Stevens Point State	Goerke Field; Stevens Point, WI	L 7–14		
October 14	Platteville	Menomonie, WI	W 19–14		
October 21	at River Falls	River Falls, WI	L 6–19		
October 28	Eau Claire State	Menomonie, WI	W 18–6		
*Non-conference game

=== Eau Claire State ===
1961 Eau Claire State Blugolds football
- Conference: Wisconsin State College Conference
- Record: 4–5 (3–5 WSCC)
- Head coach: James J. Rice (5th season)
- Home stadium: Carson Park

The 1961 Eau Claire State Blugolds football team represented Eau Claire State College (now known as University of Wisconsin–Eau Claire) in the Wisconsin State College Conference (WSCC) during the 1961 college football season. In their fifth year under head coach James J. Rice, the Blugolds compiled a 4–5 record (3–5 against WSCC opponents) and placed seventh in the WSCC.

Date	Opponent	Site	Result	Attendance	Source
September 9	Stevens Point	Carson Park; Eau Claire, WI	L 13–38		
September 16	Winona State*	Eau Claire, WI	W 6–0		
September 23	Wisconsin-Milwaukee	Carson Park; Eau Claire, WI	W 26–6		
September 30	at River Falls	River Falls, WI	L 6–7		
October 7	Platteville State	Platteville, WI	L 0–6		
October 14	Superior State	Eau Claire, WI	W 34–14		
October 21	La Crosse State	Eau Claire, WI	W 20–13		
October 28	at Stout State	Menomonie, WI	L 6–18		
November 4	at Oshkosh State	Oshkosh, WI	L 0–13		
*Non-conference game

=== Oshkosh State ===
1961 Oshkosh State Titans football
- Conference: Wisconsin State College Conference
- Record: 2–4 (2–4 WSCC)
- Head coach: Robert Kolf (30th season)

The 1961 Oshkosh State Titans football team represented Wisconsin State College–Oshkosh (now known as University of Wisconsin–Oshkosh) of Oshkosh, Wisconsin. In their 30th year under head coach Robert Kolf, the Eagles compiled a 2–4 record (2–4 against WSCC opponents) and tied for eighth place in second place in the WSCC.

Date	Opponent	Site	Result	Attendance	Source
September 23	Stevens Point State	Oshkosh, WI	L 6–33		
October 7	River Falls State	Oshkosh, WI	L 6–12		
October 14	Whitewater State	Oshkosh, WI	L 0–12		
October 21	at Wisconsin-Milwaukee	Milwaukee, WI	L 12–27		
October 28	at Platteville State	Platteville, WI	W 19–14		
November 4	Eau Claire State	Oshkosh, WI	W 13–0		

=== Milwaukee ===
1961 Milwaukee Cardinals football
- Conference: Wisconsin State College Conference
- Record: 2–6 (2–4 WSCC)
- Head coach: Wally Dreyer (2nd season)

The 1961 Milwaukee Cardinals football team represented Wisconsin State College-Milwaukee (now known as University of Wisconsin–Milwaukee) in the Wisconsin State College Conference (WSCC) during the 1961 college football season. In their second year under head coach Wally Dreyer, the Cardinals compiled a 2–6 record (2–4 against WSCC opponents) and tied for seventh place in the WSCC.

Date	Opponent	Site	Result	Attendance	Source
September 16	at Ferris Institute*	Top Taggart Field; Big Rapids, MI	L 6–32		
September 23	at Eau Claire State	Carson Park; Eau Claire, WI	L 6–26		
September 30	Platteville State	Pearse Field; Milwaukee, WI	W 6–0		
October 7	Superior State	Pearse Field; Milwaukee, WI	L 0–14		
October 14	at Stevens Point	Goerke Field; Stevens Point, WI	L 0–27		
October 21	Oshkosh State	Pearse Field; Milwaukee, WI	W 27–17		
October 28	at Whitewater State	Hamilton Field; Whitewater, WI	L 0–28		
November 4	Bradley*	Pearse Field; Milwaukee, WI	L 0–33		
*Non-conference game

=== Platteville State ===
1961 Platteville State Pioneers football
- Conference: Wisconsin State College Conference
- Record: 1–7 (1–5 WSCC)
- Head coach: Lester Leitl (16th season)

The 1961 Platteville State Pioneers football team represented Wisconsin State College–Platteville (now known as University of Wisconsin–Platteville) of Platteville, Wisconsin. In their 16th year under head coach Lester Leitl, the Pioneers compiled a 1–7 record (1–6 against WSCC opponents) and finished in last place in second place in the WSCC.

Date	Opponent	Site	Result	Attendance	Source
September 16	St. Thomas (MN)*	Saint Paul, MN	L 0–20		
September 23	at Whitewater State	Whitewater, WI	L 0–38		
September 30	at Wisconsin-Milwaukee	Milwaukee, WI	L 0–6		
October 7	Eau Claire State	Platteville, WI	W 6–0		
October 14	Stout State	Menomonie, WI	L 14–19		
October 21	Stevens Point State	Platteville, WI	L 0–27		
October 28	Oshkosh State	Platteville, WI	L 14–19		
November 4	Mankato State*	Platteville, WI	L 12–13		
*Non-conference game
