= 1946 Minnesota Teachers College Conference football season =

- Sport: Football
- Number of teams: 6
- Co-champions: Mankato State, Duluth State

Football seasons
- ← 1945 1947 →

1946 Minnesota Teachers College Conference football standings
| | Conf. | | | | | Overall |
| Team | W | | L | | T | W | | L | | T |
|---|---|---|---|---|---|---|---|---|---|---|
| Mankato State + | 3 | – | 0 | – | 1 | 5 | – | 1 | – | 1 |
| Duluth State + | 2 | – | 0 | – | 2 | 4 | – | 1 | – | 2 |
| Bemidji State | 2 | – | 2 | – | 0 | 3 | – | 4 | – | 0 |
| St. Cloud State | 2 | – | 2 | – | 0 | 3 | – | 4 | – | 0 |
| Moorhead State | 1 | – | 2 | – | 1 | 2 | – | 3 | – | 2 |
| Winona State | 0 | – | 4 | – | 0 | 0 | – | 6 | – | 0 |
+ – Conference co-champions

The 1946 Minnesota Teachers College Conference football season was the season of college football played by the six member schools of the Minnesota Teachers College Conference as part of the 1946 college football season. Mankato State and Duluth State were co-champions of the conference. None of the Minnesota Teachers College Conference teams was ranked in the Associated Press poll or played in a bowl game.

== Conference overview ==
| Conf. rank | Team | Head coach | Conf. record | Overall record | Points scored | Points against |
|---|---|---|---|---|---|---|
| 1 (tie) | Mankato State | Jim Clark | 3–0–1 | 5–1–1 | 83 | 45 |
| 1 (tie) | Duluth State | Lloyd Peterson | 2–0–2 | 4–1–2 | 60 | 33 |
| 3 (tie) | Bemidji State | Hjalmer J. Erickson | 2–2 | 3–4 | 76 | 90 |
| 3 (tie) | St. Cloud State | Edward M. Colletti | 2–2 | 3–4 | 58 | 74 |
| 5 | Moorhead State | Neil Wohlwend | 1–2–1 | 2–3–2 | 46 | 57 |
| 6 | Winona State | Eugene Brodhagen | 0–4 | 0–6 | 25 | 89 |

== All-conference team ==
The conference coaches picked an all-conference team consisting of first-team and second-team selections. The first team picks were:

- Ends: Gus Novotny, Duluth; Wallace Spielman, Mankato; Lee Hooslien, Bemidji
- Tackles: Robert Fielder, Moorhead; Wesley Olson, Duluth; Delos Wilcox, Bemidji
- Guards: George Rinelsub, Mankato; Dan Mestnick, St. Cloud; Don Peterson, Bemidji
- Center: Henry Lewer, Mankato
- Backs: Robert Galinski, Duluth; Richard Otterstad, Bemidji; Roy Walters, Mankato; Jerry Krenz, Moorhead

== Teams ==
=== Mankato State ===
1946 Mankato State Indians football

MTCC co-champion
- Conference: Minnesota Teachers College Conference
- Record: 5–1–1 (3–0–1 MTCC)
- Head coach: Jim Clark (5th season)

The 1946 Mankato State Indians football team was an American football team that represented Mankato State Teachers College (now known as Minnesota State University, Mankato) as a member of the Minnesota Teachers College Conference (MTCC) during the 1946 college football season. In their fifth, non-consecutive season under head coach Jim Clark, and after a three-year hiatus during World War II, the Indians compiled a 5–1–1 record (3–0–1 against MTCC opponents), tied with Duluth State for the MTCC championship, and outscored opponents by a total of 83 to 48.

| Date | Opponent | Site | Result | Source |
|---|---|---|---|---|
| September 21 | Augsburg* | Mankato, MN | W 13–0 | |
| September 27 | at Superior State* | Superior, WI | W 14–12 | |
| October 4 | at Duluth State | Duluth, MN | T 0–0 | |
| October 12 | St. Cloud State | Mankato, MN | W 14–2 | |
| October 18 | Bemidji State | Mankato, MN | W 21–12 | |
| October 25 | at Winona State | Winona, MN | W 21–7 | |
| November 11 | at Gustavus Adolphus* | St. Peter, MN (Armistice Day) | L 0–14 | |
*Non-conference game

=== Duluth State ===
1946 Duluth State Bulldogs football

MTCC co-champion
- Conference: Minnesota Teachers College Conference
- Record: 3–1–2 (2–0–2 MTCC)
- Head coach: Lloyd Peterson (13th season)

The 1946 Duluth State Bulldogs football team was an American football team that represented Duluth State Teachers College (now known as University of Minnesota Duluth) as a member of the Minnesota Teachers College Conference (MTCC) during the 1946 college football season. Led by head coach Lloyd Peterson, the Bulldogs compiled a 3–1–2 record (2–0–2 against MTCC opponents), tied with Mankato State for the MTCC championship, and outscored opponents by a total of 60 to 33.

| Date | Opponent | Site | Result | Source |
|---|---|---|---|---|
| | Duluth JC | | W 13–7 | |
| October 4 | Mankato State | Duluth, MN | T 0–0 | |
| October 12 | at Winona State | Maxwell Field; Winona, MN | W 22–6 | |
| October 18 | at Moorhead State | Moorhead, MN | T 7–7 | |
| October 23 | Bemidji State | Duluth, MN | W 12–0 | |
| November 2 | Superior State* | | L 6–13 | |
*Non-conference game

=== Bemidji State ===
1946 Bemidji State Beavers football
- Conference: Minnesota Teachers College Conference
- Record: 3–4 (2–2 MTCC)
- Head coach: Hjalmer J. Erickson (9th season)

The 1946 Bemidji State Beavers football team was an American football team that represented Bemidji State Teachers College (later renamed Bemidji State University) as a member of the Minnesota Teachers College Conference (MTCC) during the 1946 college football season. Led by head coach Hjalmer J. Erickson, the Bulldogs compiled a 3–4 record (2–2 against MTCC opponents), tied for third place in the MTCC, and were outscored by a total of 90 to 76.

| Date | Opponent | Site | Result | Source |
|---|---|---|---|---|
| September 13 | North Dakota | Bemidji, MN | L 0–25 | |
| September 20 | Saint John's | Beidji, MN | L 0–32 | |
| September 27 | at Mayville (ND) | Mayville, ND | W 39–0 | |
| October 5 | St. Cloud State | Bemidji, MN | W 18–0 | |
| October 11 | Moorhead State | Bemidji, MN | W 7–0 | |
| October 18 | at Mankato State | Mankato, MN | L 12–21 | |
| October 23 | at Duluth State | Duluth, MN | L 0–12 | |

=== St. Cloud State ===
1946 St. Cloud State Huskies football
- Conference: Minnesota Teachers College Conference
- Record: 3–4 (2–2 MTCC)
- Head coach: Edward M. Colletti

The 1946 St. Cloud State Huskies football team was an American football team that represented St. Cloud State Teachers College (later renamed St. Cloud State University) as a member of the Minnesota Teachers College Conference (MTCC) during the 1946 college football season. Led by head coach Edward M. Colletti, the Huskies compiled a 3–4 record (2–2 against MTCC opponents), tied for third place in the MTCC, and were outscored by a total of 74 to 58.

| Date | Opponent | Site | Result | Source |
|---|---|---|---|---|
| September 27 | at River Falls State | River Falls, WI | L 6–12 | |
| October 5 | at Bemidji State | Bemidji, MN | L 0–18 | |
| October 12 | at Mankato State | Mankato, MN | L 0–14 | |
| October 19 | Winona State | St. Cloud, MN | W 14–12 | |
| October 23 | Aberdeen Teachers | Tech Stadium; St. Cloud, MN | W 24–0 | |
| November 2 | Moorhead State | St. Cloud, MN | W 14–0 | |
| November 9 | at Saint John's (MN) | Collegeville, MN | L 0–18 | |

=== Moorhead State ===
1946 Moorhead State Dragons football
- Conference: Minnesota Teachers College Conference
- Record: 2–3–2 (1–2–1 MTCC)
- Head coach: Neil Wohlwend (1st season)

The 1946 Moorhead State Dragons football team was an American football team that represented Moorhead State Teachers College (later renamed Minnesota State University Moorhead) as a member of the Minnesota Teachers College Conference (MTCC) during the 1946 college football season. Led by head coach Neil Wohlwend, the Dragons compiled a 2–3–2 record (1–2–1 against MTCC opponents), finished in fifth place in the MTCC, and were outscored by a total of 57 to 46.

Roy Domek and Marco Gotta were assistant coaches.

| Date | Opponent | Site | Result | Source |
|---|---|---|---|---|
| September 21 | Concordia (MN) | Moorhead, MN | T 7–7 | |
| September 27 | at Wahpeton State School of Science | Wahpeton, ND | W 14–7 | |
| October 5 | Winona State | Moorhead, MN | W 6–0 | |
| October 11 | at Bemidji State | Bemidji, MN | L 0–7 | |
| October 18 | Duluth State | Moorhead, MN | T 7–7 | |
| October 26 | Stout Institute | Moorhead, MN | L 12–15 | |
| November 2 | at St. Cloud State | St. Cloud, MN | L 0–14 | |

=== Winona State ===
1946 Winona State Warriors football
- Conference: Minnesota Teachers College Conference
- Record: 0–6 (0–4 MTCC)
- Head coach: Eugene Brodhagen (1st season)
- Home stadium: Maxwell Field

The 1946 Winona State Warriors football team was an American football team that represented Winona State Teachers College (later renamed Winona State University) as a member of the Minnesota Teachers College Conference (MTCC) during the 1946 college football season. Led by head coach Eugene Brodhagen, the Warriors compiled a 0–6 record (0–4 against MTCC opponents), finished in last place in the MTCC, and were outscored by a total of 89 to 25.

It was Winona's first winless season since 1935.

| Date | Opponent | Site | Result | Source |
|---|---|---|---|---|
| September 21 | at Macalester | Shaw Field; Winona, MN | L 0–13 | |
| October 5 | at Moorhead State | Moorhead, MN | L 0–6 | |
| October 12 | Duluth State | Maxwell Field; Winona, MN | L 6–22 | |
| October 19 | at St. Cloud State | St. Cloud, MN | L 13–14 | |
| October 25 | Mankato State | Maxwell Field; Winona, MN | L 7–21 | |
| November 2 | Saint Mary's (MN) | Maxwell Field; Winona, MN | L 0–13 | |
