= Frank Conroy =

Frank Conroy may refer to:

- Frank Conroy (actor) (1890–1964), British film and stage actor
- Frank Conroy (American football) (c. 1939–2016), American football coach
- Frank Conroy (author) (1936–2005), American author
- A character in The Equalizer 3
