= Arthur Meyer =

Arthur Meyer may refer to:

- Arthur Meyer (journalist) (1844–1924), French journalist and newspaper magnate
- Arthur Meyer (botanist) (1850–1922), German botanist
- Arthur Meyer (American football) (1890–?), American college football and basketball player and coach

== See also ==
- Arthur Meier (disambiguation)
- Arthur Myers (disambiguation)
