= Wohlwend =

Wohlwend is a surname. Notable people with the surname include:

- Christine Wohlwend (born 1978), Liechtensteiner politician
- Fabienne Wohlwend (born 1997), Liechtenstein racing driver
- Greg Wohlwend, American video game developer
- Johannes Wohlwend (born 1964), Liechtenstein judoka
- Mario Wohlwend (born 1973), Liechtenstein politician
- Neil Wohlwend (1913–1978), American football and basketball coach, and politician
