= Peter Jennings (disambiguation) =

Peter Jennings (1938–2005) was a Canadian-American television journalist.

Peter Jennings may also refer to:

- Sir Peter Jennings (serjeant-at-arms) (born 1934), British public servant and serjeant-at-arms
- Peter Jennings (American football), American college football coach
- Peter R. Jennings (born 1950), Canadian scientist and entrepreneur
- Peter Jennings, executive director of Australian Strategic Policy Institute
- Peter Jennings, scientist, International Rice Research Institute
- Peter Jennings, keyboardist for Cressida (band).
