= Eddie Suech =

American sports coach and administrator (1903–1977)

Biographical details
- Born: 1903
- Died: February 13, 1977 (aged 77); Youngtown, Arizona, U.S.

Coaching career (HC unless noted)

Football
- 1936–1938: Cretin HS (MN)
- 1939–1947: Saint Mary's (MN)

Basketball
- 1931–?: Duluth Cathedral HS (MN)
- 1936–1939: Cretin HS (MN)
- 1939–1948: Saint Mary's (MN)

Baseball
- 1940: Saint Mary's (MN)

Administrative career (AD unless noted)
- 1939–1948: Saint Mary's (MN)

Head coaching record
- Overall: 24–36–1 (college football); 97–68 (college basketball); 2–9 (college baseball)

Edward D. Suech (1903 – February 13, 1977) was an American football, basketball, and baseball coach and college athletics administrator. He served as the head football coach at Saint Mary's College—now known as Saint Mary's University of Minnesota—in Winona, Minnesota from 1939 to 1947, compiling a record of 24–36–1. Suech was also the head basketball coach at Saint Mary's from 1939 to 1948, amassing a record of 97–68, the school's head baseball coach in 1940, tallying a mark of 2–9, and the athletic director at Saint Mary's from 1939 to 1948.

Suech attended Duluth Cathedral High School in Duluth, Minnesota. He was captain of the basketball team in 1922–23 and a teammate of Joe Benda. Suech later played football and basketball at Superior State Teachers College—now known as University of Wisconsin–Superior. He was appointed basketball coach at Duluth Cathedral in 1931.

Suech came to Saint Mary's in 1939 after coaching football and basketball for three years at Cretin High School in Saint Paul, Minnesota.

Suech died at the age of 77, on February 13, 1977, at Valley View Hospital in Youngtown, Arizona.

== Head coaching record ==
=== College football ===
Year	Team	Overall	Conference	Standing	Bowl/playoffs
Saint Mary's Redmen (Minnesota Intercollegiate Athletic Conference) (1939–1947)
1939	Saint Mary's	5–2	4–1	2nd	
1940	Saint Mary's	5–3	4–2	4th	
1941	Saint Mary's	4–3	3–2	T–3rd	
1942	Saint Mary's	1–7	0–5	T–8th	
1943	Saint Mary's	3–1	NA	NA	
1944	Saint Mary's	1–6	NA		
1945	Saint Mary's	0–5	0–1	T–6th	
1946	Saint Mary's	4–3–1	1–2–1	6th	
1947	Saint Mary's	1–6	0–4	8th	
Saint Mary's:		24–36–1	12–17–1		
Total:		24–36–1			
