= Duaine Counsell =

American football and baseball coach (1924–2007)

Biographical details
- Born: July 9, 1924; Wisconsin Dells, Wisconsin, U.S.
- Died: December 24, 2007 (aged 83); La Crosse, Wisconsin, U.S.

Playing career

Football
- 1946–1949: Stevens Point State

Coaching career (HC unless noted)

Football
- 1957–1965: Stevens Point State
- 1967–1968: Stevens Point State

Baseball
- 1959–1962: Stevens Point State

Head coaching record
- Overall: 56–33–4 (football); 40–14 (baseball)

Accomplishments and honors

Championships
- Football; 1 WSCC (1961)

Duaine K. Counsell (July 9, 1924 – December 24, 2007) was an American football and baseball coach. He served as the head football coach at the University of Wisconsin–Stevens Point from 1957 to 1965 and from 1967 to 1968, compiling a record of 56–33–4. Counsell was also the head baseball coach at Wisconsin–Stevens Point from 1959 to 1962, tallying a mark of 40–14.

== Head coaching record ==
=== Football ===
Year	Team	Overall	Conference	Standing	Bowl/playoffs
Stevens Point State Pointers (Wisconsin State College Conference / Wisconsin State University Conference) (1957–1965)
1957	Stevens Point State	3–4	2–4	8th	
1958	Stevens Point State	7–0–1	5–0–1	2nd	
1959	Stevens Point State	4–3–1	3–3–1	4th	
1960	Stevens Point State	5–3	4–3	4th	
1961	Stevens Point State	8–1	7–1	1st	
1962	Stevens Point State	6–2	5–2	T–3rd	
1963	Stevens Point State	6–2	6–1	2nd	
1964	Stevens Point State	3–6	3–4	T–6th	
1965	Stevens Point State	6–3	4–2	4th	
Stevens Point State Pointers (Wisconsin State University Conference) (1967–1968)
1967	Stevens Point State	6–2–1	6–1–1	2nd	
1968	Stevens Point State	2–7–1	2–5–1	T–6th	
Stevens Point State:		56–33–4	47–27–4		
Total:		56–33–4			
National championship Conference title Conference division title or championship game berth
