= Louis H. Galbreath =

American educator (1861–1899)

Louis Hutchinson Galbreath
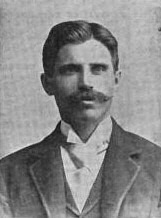
- Galbreath, c. 1899
- Born: December 22, 1861; Ashmore, Illinois, U.S.
- Died: August 14, 1899 (aged 37); New York, New York, U.S.
- Resting place: Angola, New York, U.S.
- Education: Illinois State University; Cornell University
- Occupations: educator; football coach
- Employers: Winona State University; Illinois State University; University at Buffalo; Eastern Illinois University
- Spouse: Julia Aver Tifft (m. 1895)
- Children: 2

Louis Hutchinson Galbreath (December 22, 1861 – August 14, 1899) was an American educator who specialized in training teachers and advocated educational psychology and scientific pedagogy. A graduate of both Illinois State University and Cornell University, he had his career cut short when he died from typhoid fever. In 1896, while a professor at Illinois State, he became the second head football coach at the school.

== Early years ==
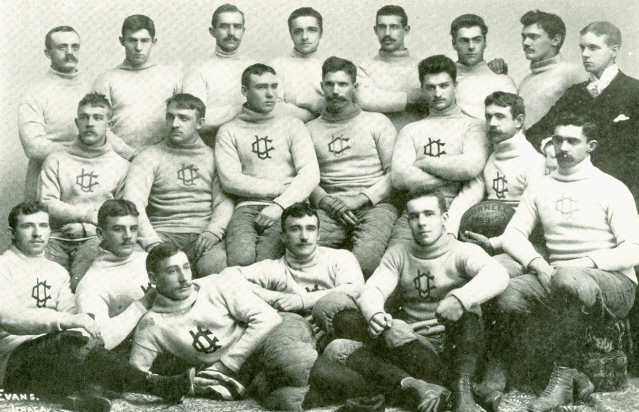
1889 Cornell football team: Galbreath is the fourth from the left in the middle row

Galbreath was born on December 22, 1861, in the Eastern Illinois town of Ashmore. He attended the Illinois State University (then known as Illinois State Normal University), where he graduated in 1885. Galbreath then attended Cornell University in Ithaca, New York as a member of the class of 1890. After some interruptions, he graduated from Cornell with a B.L. While at Cornell, he was known as a standout center on the football team. He lettered in football in 1888, 1889, 1890 and 1891, when he opened running lanes for College Football Hall of Fame running back Winchester Osgood. In the four years he played football, Cornell's record was a combined 25 wins and 11 losses. He was also active at Cornell with the Christian Association, and was a member of Sphinx Head.

== Educator ==
Eventually, Galbreath worked at several colleges training future teachers. He was known as persistent advocate of educational psychology, and scientific pedagogy. He was very involved in his profession by speaking before many institutes and educational associations and writing in Educational Journals. He taught pedagogy and psychology at the State Normal School at Winona, Minnesota (now known as Winona State University). In 1896, he left Winona State and joined the faculty of the Illinois State in Normal, Illinois taking the place of noted educator Dr. Charles Alexander McMurry, who moved on to the University of Chicago. The next year, he became the Chair of Psychology and Child Studies at the School of Pedagogy at University at Buffalo (now known as The State University of New York at Buffalo). He held this position until it closed in 1898. After he left Buffalo he moved to New York City, accepting a fellowship in Columbia University. Before the 1899 school year, he accepted the chair of Pedagogy at Eastern Illinois University (then known as Eastern Illinois State Normal School) before taking the position he died from typhoid fever in New York City, and was buried at Angola, New York.

== Football coach ==
While teaching at Illinois State, Galbreath became the second head football coach for the Illinois State Redbirds football team, serving for one season, in 1896, and compiling a record of 2–0.

== Family ==
Born on December 22, 1861, northwest of Ashmore in Coles County, Illinois, he was the second youngest of 13 children of James and Martha Houston Mitchell Galbreath. In 1895, Galbreath married Julia Aver Tifft of Ithaca, New York. Like her husband, she was a graduate of Cornell University (class of 1893). They had two boys, who were very young when their father died in 1899.

== Head coaching record ==
=== Football ===
Year	Team	Overall	Conference	Standing	Bowl/playoffs
Winona State Warriors (Independent) (1895)
1895	Winona State	0–3			
Winona State:		0–3			
Illinois State Redbirds (Independent) (1896)
1896	Illinois State	2–0			
Illinois State:		2–0			
Total:		2–3			
