= Madeo Molinari =

American Athlete and Sports Coach

Biographical details
- Born: March 23, 1920; Chicago, Illinois, U.S.
- Died: October 20, 2011 (aged 91)

Playing career

Football
- c. 1938–1942: Ripon

Basketball
- c. 1938–1942: Ripon

Track and field
- c. 1938–1942: Ripon
- Position: End (football)

Coaching career (HC unless noted)

Football
- c. 1943: Ripon HS (WI)?
- 1946: Ripon (ends)
- c. 1948–1952: Sandwich HS (IL)
- 1954–1955: Iron Mountain HS (MI)
- 1956–1957: Winona State (assistant)
- 1958–1970: Winona State

Basketball
- 1946–1947: Ripon (JV)
- c. 1948–1953: Sandwich HS (IL)

Tennis
- 1946: Ripon

Track and field
- c. 1948–1953: Sandwich HS (IL)
- 1955–c. 1956: Iron Mountain HS (MI)

Baseball
- c. 1948–1953: Sandwich HS (IL)
- c. 1954–1956: Iron Mountain HS (MI)
- 1957–1958: Winona State

Golf
- 1954–1956: Iron Mountain HS (MI)
- 1959–1978: Winona State

Administrative career (AD unless noted)
- c. 1948–1953: Sandwich HS (IL)
- 1954–1956: Iron Mountain HS (MI)

Head coaching record
- Overall: 49–53–4 (college football); 66–33–9 (college golf)

Accomplishments and honors

Championships
- Football; 3 NSCC/NIC (1962, 1964, 1968)

Madeo "Moon" Molinari (March 23, 1920 – October 20, 2011) was an American athlete and sports coach. He was best known for his time at Winona State University, where he coached football, baseball, and golf for many years.

A native of Chicago, Molinari graduated from Steinmetz College Prep in 1938 and afterwards played three sports at Ripon College in Wisconsin. An all-conference end and participant in the discus throw and basketball player, Molinari graduated in 1943. He served in World War II, and after being discharged, began coaching multiple sports and serving as athletic director at Sandwich High School in c. 1948, with which he served through 1953.

After a stint at Iron Mountain High School which lasted from 1954 to 1956, Molinari became assistant football coach and head baseball coach at Winona State University. After helping the football team win two consecutive conference championships, he was promoted to head coach in 1958, a position in which he served through 1970. He developed some of the most successful teams in school history, winning three conference championships as head coach before resigning after his 13th season. An inductee into the school's hall of fame in 1989, he lived in retirement in Florida and died in 2011.

== Early life and education ==
Molinari was born on March 23, 1920, in Chicago, Illinois, to an Italian family. His father died when he was young and his older brother had to work to support the family. Molinari attended Steinmetz College Prep where he was a star athlete. He graduated from Steinmetz in 1938 and afterwards enrolled at Ripon College in Wisconsin. Molinari majored in biology and physical education and played for the school's football, basketball, and track and field teams. It was here where he acquired his lifelong nickname "Moon." Playing end in football, he was an all-conference selection and helped them to two consecutive conference championships, while serving as team captain in his senior year. He also threw discus for the track team and was a member of the graduating class of 1943. Molinari received a bachelor's degree from Ripon.

Molinari served in World War II after his time at Ripon, eventually achieving the rank of captain. He served for a time at the Miami Beach OCS, before being sent to Barksdale Air Force Base in Louisiana, where he was the Base PT Officer. At Barksdale, he married his college sweetheart Rosemary Middleton, whom he had three children with and remained married to until his death. Molinari was later reassigned to Morris Field in North Carolina.

== Coaching career ==
External videos
- Madeo "Moon" Molinari (2008). Video about the life of Molinari.

According to Barksdale's Bark, Molinari coached a high school team in Ripon, Wisconsin, after his graduation from college but before serving in the war. In 1946, he was hired by his alma mater of Ripon as a physical education instructor, football end coach, junior varsity basketball coach, and head tennis coach. Molinari served in these positions for one year, before leaving in May 1947 to study at Indiana University Bloomington.

Around 1948, Molinari became head football coach, track and field coach, baseball coach, basketball coach, athletic director, and boys physical education teacher at Sandwich High School. He led his football team to four consecutive undefeated seasons and conference championships, before resigning in 1953 to study at the University of Wisconsin–Madison, from which he received a master's degree.

Molinari returned to coaching in 1954 as head of the football team at Iron Mountain High School in Michigan. He also served as athletic director, baseball coach, and golf coach, and in his second season added the role of track coach. After being told by a friend about an opening at Winona State University, he resigned from Iron Mountain in June 1956 to accept the job. "I didn't know anything about it," Molinari later said, "but it turned out to be ... perfect."

Molinari began as assistant football coach, and added on the title of baseball coach in 1957. His baseball teams won three conference championships (two NIC, one Bi-State Conference) over a period of two years, and he helped the football team win championships in 1956 and 1957. In 1958, Molinari was promoted to head football coach. He stopped coaching baseball in order to accept the position.

Molinari went on to serve a total of 13 seasons as head football coach, and developed several of the best teams in school history. He led them to conference championships three times as head coach, in addition to several seasons as conference runner-up. They ranked top ten nationally in defense from 1961 to 1962, and in the latter, as well as 1964, went undefeated in conference play.

Molinari was named the conference coach of the year in 1968, but resigned two years later after a 2–7 record in 1970. He finished with an overall record of 49–53–4, which is the second-highest number of wins as well as the fourth-highest winning percentage (.481) in school history as of 2021. Molinari was also the golf coach at Winona State, having received the position in 1959, and continued serving in the position even after resigning as football coach. He left the program following the 1978 season, and finished with a 66–33–9 record. He was inducted into the Winona State Athletic Hall of Fame in 1989.

== Later life and death ==
After retiring as a coach, Molinari joined the Chicago Mercantile Exchange, where he worked for several years. Afterwards, he moved with his wife to a retirement beach home in Florida. After living there for around 20 years, he moved back to the midwest, where he spent the final years of his life. Molinari died on October 20, 2011, at the age of 91.

== Head coaching record ==
=== College football ===
Year	Team	Overall	Conference	Standing	Bowl/playoffs
Winona State Warriors (Northern State College Conference / Northern Intercollegiate Conference) (1958–1970)
1958	Winona State	3–4–1	1–3–1	4th	
1959	Winona State	2–5	2–3	4th	
1960	Winona State	4–3–1	1–3–1	5th	
1961	Winona State	4–3–1	2–2–1	4th	
1962	Winona State	6–1–1	5–0	1st	
1963	Winona State	1–7	0–5	6th	
1964	Winona State	6–1	5–0	1st	
1965	Winona State	6–2	3–2	T–2nd	
1966	Winona State	2–6	2–3	T–4th	
1967	Winona State	6–3	4–1	2nd	
1968	Winona State	5–4	4–1	T–1st	
1969	Winona State	2–7	0–4	6th	
1970	Winona State	2–7	1–5	T–5th	
Winona State:		49–53–4	30–32–3		
Total:		49–53–4			
National championship Conference title Conference division title or championship game berth
