= Russell Young (American football) =

American football and basketball coach (1912–1983)

Biographical details
- Born: March 19, 1912; Portage, Wisconsin, U.S.
- Died: January 19, 1983 (aged 70); Portage, Wisconsin, U.S.

Coaching career (HC unless noted)

Football
- 1943–1955: West De Pere HS (WI)
- 1956–1957: Ripon (assistant)
- 1958: Wayne State (MI)
- 1959–1962: Wisconsin–Oshkosh (assistant)
- 1963–1976: Wisconsin–Oshkosh
- 1977–1981: Wisconsin–Whitewater (assistant)

Basketball
- 1956–1958: Ripon
- 1962–1964: Wisconsin–Oshkosh

Head coaching record
- Overall: 72–68–2 (college football); 48–61 (college basketball)

Accomplishments and honors

Championships
- Football; 3 WSUC (1968, 1972, 1976)

Russell Kenneth Young (March 19, 1912 – January 19, 1983) was an American football and basketball coach. He served as the head football coach at Nebraska State Teachers College at Wayne—now known as Wayne State College—in 1958 and the University of Wisconsin–Oshkosh in Oshkosh, Wisconsin from 1963 to 1976, compiling a career college football coaching 72–68–2 record of. Young was also the head basketball coach at Ripon College in Ripon, Wisconsin from 1956 to 1958 and Wisconsin–Oshkosh from 1962 o 1964, tallying a career college basketball coaching mark of 48–61.

== Head coaching record ==
=== College football ===
Year	Team	Overall	Conference	Standing	Bowl/playoffs
Wayne State Wildcats (Nebraska College Conference) (1958)
1958	Wayne State	4–5	4–4	6th	
Wayne State:		4–5	4–4		
Wisconsin–Oshkosh Titans (Wisconsin State College Conference / Wisconsin State University Conference) (1963–1976)
1963	Wisconsin–Oshkosh	0–5–2	0–5–2	9th	
1964	Wisconsin–Oshkosh	5–4	3–4	T–6th	
1965	Wisconsin–Oshkosh	5–4	3–4	6th	
1966	Wisconsin–Oshkosh	3–6	3–5	6th	
1967	Wisconsin–Oshkosh	6–3	6–2	3rd	
1968	Wisconsin–Oshkosh	8–2	7–1	T–st	
1969	Wisconsin–Oshkosh	6–4	5–3	T–3rd	
1970	Wisconsin–Oshkosh	5–5	5–3	T–2nd	
1971	Wisconsin–Oshkosh	4–6	4–4	T–4th	
1972	Wisconsin–Oshkosh	8–2	8–0	1st	
1973	Wisconsin–Oshkosh	4–6	4–4	T–4th	
1974	Wisconsin–Oshkosh	3–7	2–6	T–6th	
1975	Wisconsin–Oshkosh	3–7	3–5	T–5th	
1976	Wisconsin–Oshkosh	8–2	6–2	T–1st	
Wisconsin–Oshkosh:		68–63–2	59–48–2		
Total:		72–68–2			
National championship Conference title Conference division title or championship game berth
