= Herman Kluge =

American football and swimming coach (1905–1991)

Biographical details
- Born: January 12, 1905; Milwaukee, Wisconsin, U.S.
- Died: June 22, 1991 (aged 86); Milwaukee, Wisconsin, U.S.

Coaching career (HC unless noted)

Football
- 1931–1955: Milwaukee State

Administrative career (AD unless noted)
- 1956–1969: Milwaukee

Head coaching record
- Overall: 76–83–14 (football)

Accomplishments and honors

Championships
- Football; 1 WSTCC (1931); 5 WSTCC South Division (1938, 1939, 1942, 1947–1948)

Herman Kluge (January 12, 1905 – June 22, 1991) was an American football and swimming coach. He was born in Milwaukee, graduated from Riverside High School, and graduated from Milwaukee State Teachers College (later renamed University of Wisconsin–Milwaukee) in 1927, where he competed for the football and track teams. He received a master's degree in physical education from New York University. He served as the head football and swimming coach at his alma mater from 1931 to 1969. He led the football team to six conference championships (1931, 1938, 1939, 1942, 1947 and 1948). He was also the school's athletic director from 1937 to 1970 and chairman of the physical education department. He continued teaching at the school until 1974. He was inducted into the University of Wisconsin-Milwaukee Hall of Fame as part of its inaugural class in 1972.

== Head coaching record ==
=== Football ===
Year	Team	Overall	Conference	Standing	Bowl/playoffs
Milwaukee State Green Gulls (Wisconsin State Teachers College Conference / Wisconsin State College Conference) (1931–1955)
1931	Milwaukee State	5–2	4–0	1st	
1932	Milwaukee State	5–3	3–2	5th	
1933	Milwaukee State	5–3	3–1	2nd	
1934	Milwaukee State	3–4–1	3–1	2nd (Southern)	
1935	Milwaukee State	4–3	2–2	3rd (Southern)	
1936	Milwaukee State	3–6	2–2	T–3rd (Southern)	
1937	Milwaukee State	3–3–1	3–1	2nd (Southern)	
1938	Milwaukee State	4–3	3–1	T–1st (Southern)	
1939	Milwaukee State	5–1–1	4–0	1st (Southern)	
1940	Milwaukee State	4–4	2–2	3rd (Southern)	
1941	Milwaukee State	1–6	1–3	4th (Southern)	
1942	Milwaukee State	3–0–3	3–0–1	T–1st (Southern)	
1943	No team—World War II				
1944	No team—World War II				
1945	Milwaukee State	3–1			
1946	Milwaukee State	3–3–1	3–1	T–1st (Southern)	
1947	Milwaukee State	6–2	4–0	1st (Southern)	
1948	Milwaukee State	4–3–1	4–1–1	T–2nd	
1949	Milwaukee State	3–4–1	3–2–1	4th	
1950	Milwaukee State	3–4–1	2–3–1	T–5th	
1951	Milwaukee State	1–4–3	1–2–3	6th	
1952	Milwaukee State	0–8	0–4	5th (Southern)	
1953	Milwaukee State	2–6	2–3	T–6th	
1954	Milwaukee State	4–4–1	2–2–1	T–6th	
1955	Milwaukee State	2–6	2–3	6th	
Milwaukee State:		76–83–14	56–36–8		
Total:		76–83–14			
National championship Conference title Conference division title or championship game berth
