= Arthur Myers (disambiguation) =

Sir Arthur Myers (1868–1926) was an Australian-born New Zealand politician.

Arthur Myers may also refer to:

- Arthur Thomas Myers (1851–1894), British physician and sportsman
- Arthur Wallis Myers (1878–1939), British journalist and sportsman
- Sir Arthur Douglas Myers (1938–2017), New Zealand businessman

== See also ==
- Arthur Meier (disambiguation)
- Arthur Meyer (disambiguation)
