= Robert Kolf =

American football coach (1898–1990)

Biographical details
- Born: February 1, 1898; Minneapolis, Minnesota, U.S.
- Died: March 31, 1990 (aged 92); Oshkosh, Wisconsin, U.S.

Playing career

Football
- 1919–1921: Oshkosh Normal

Basketball
- 1919–1922: Oshkosh Normal

Baseball
- c. 1920: Oshkosh Normal
- Positions: Quarterback (football); Guard (basketball)

Coaching career (HC unless noted)

Football
- 1926: Ripon (backfield)
- 1929: Oshkosh State
- 1931–1942: Oshkosh State
- 1946–1962: Oshkosh State

Basketball
- 1922–1923: Shawano HS (WI)
- 1926–1927: Ripon

Head coaching record
- Overall: 59–123–16 (college football)

Accomplishments and honors

Championships
- Football; 1 WSTCC Southern Division (1935)

Robert Maguire Kolf (February 1, 1898 – May 31, 1990) was an American football coach and college athletics administrator. He was an alumnus of Oshkosh Normal School (later renamed the University of Wisconsin–Oshkosh). He returned to the school as an instructor and coach in 1923. He was an athletic coach at the school for 45 years, leading the school to 29 conference championships in 10 sports. He was the football coach in 1929, from 1931 to 1942, and 1946 to 1962. He also served as the athletic director and coached basketball, tennis, track and field, and golf, among other sports. He was part of the inaugural class inducted into the UW Oshkosh Athletic Hall of Fame in 1974. The Kolf Sports Center at Oshkosh opened in 1971 and was named in his honor.

== Head coaching record ==
=== Football ===
Year	Team	Overall	Conference	Standing	Bowl/playoffs
Oshkosh State Titans (Wisconsin State Teachers College Conference) (1929)
1929	Oshkosh State	3–4	3–2	T–5th	
Oshkosh State Titans (Wisconsin State Teachers College Conference) (1931–1942)
1931	Oshkosh State	3–4–1	2–3–1	6th	
1932	Oshkosh State	2–4–1	1–3–1	8th	
1933	Oshkosh State	4–1–2	2–1–1	T–3rd	
1934	Oshkosh State	3–3–1	1–3	4th (Southern)	
1935	Oshkosh State	6–0–1	4–0	1st (Southern)	
1936	Oshkosh State	3–3–2	1–1–2	T–2nd (Southern)	
1937	Oshkosh State	0–7	0–4	5th (Southern)	
1938	Oshkosh State	1–6	0–4	5th (Southern)	
1939	Oshkosh State	1–5	0–4	5th (Southern)	
1940	Oshkosh State	1–5	0–4	5th (Southern)	
1941	Oshkosh State	0–6	0–4	5th (Southern)	
1942	Oshkosh State	0–5	0–4	5th (Southern)	
Oshkosh State Titans (Wisconsin State Teachers College Conference / Wisconsin State College Conference) (1946–1962)
1946	Oshkosh State	2–4	2–2	T–3rd (Southern)	
1947	Oshkosh State	3–4	1–3	5th (Southern)	
1948	Oshkosh State	1–4–1	1–4–1	T–8th	
1949	Oshkosh State	1–5	1–5	10th	
1950	Oshkosh State	0–6	0–6	10th	
1951	Oshkosh State	0–4–1	0–4–1	10th	
1952	Oshkosh State	2–3	2–2	3rd (Southern)	
1953	Oshkosh State	0–6	0–5	T–9th	
1954	Oshkosh State	2–2–2	2–2–2	T–6th	
1955	Oshkosh State	0–5–2	0–5–1	10th	
1956	Oshkosh State	3–4	2–4	8th	
1957	Oshkosh State	4–3	3–3	4th	
1958	Oshkosh State	6–2	4–2	T–3rd	
1959	Oshkosh State	3–3–2	2–3–2	6th	
1960	Oshkosh State	3–4	3–4	6th	
1961	Oshkosh State	2–4	2–4	T–8th	
1962	Oshkosh State	0–7	0–7	10th	
Oshkosh State:		59–123–16	39–102–12		
Total:		59–123–16			
National championship Conference title Conference division title or championship game berth
