= Bob Carlson =

American football and baseball player and coach

Biographical details
- Born: August 6, 1913; Alexandria, Minnesota, U.S.
- Died: December 9, 2000 (aged 87); Minneapolis, Minnesota, U.S.
- Education: University of Minnesota (1938)

Playing career

Football
- 1935–1936: Minnesota

Baseball
- 1937: Minnesota
- Position: End

Coaching career (HC unless noted)

Football
- 1937: Minnesota (B team)
- 1938–1939: Glenwood HS (MN)
- 1940–1941: Augsburg
- 1946: Augsburg
- 1949–1950: Wichita (freshmen)
- 1951–1952: Wichita

Basketball
- 1938–1940: Glenwood HS (MN)
- 1940–?: Augsburg (assistant)

Baseball
- 1939–1940: Glenwood HS (MN)
- 1941–?: Augsburg (assistant)
- 1951: Wichita

Head coaching record
- Overall: 8–30–1 (college football); 1–4 (college baseball)

Robert Stewart Carlson (August 6, 1913 – December 9, 2000) was an American college football and college baseball player and coach. He served as the head football coach at Augsburg College from 1940 to 1941 and again in 1946 and at the Municipal University of Wichita—now Wichita State University—from 1951 to 1952, compiling a career college football head coaching record of 8–30–1.

Carlson played football at the University of Minnesota as an end in 1935 and 1936, on teams coached by Bernie Bierman. In 1937, he coached the "B" football team at Minnesota. After graduating from University of Minnesota, Carlson was hired, in 1938, as coach at Glennwood High School in Glenwood, Minnesota, where he also taught physical education. In 1940, he was hired by Augsburg College as head football coach and assistant coach in basketball, and baseball.

Carlson died on December 9, 2000.

== Head coaching record ==
=== Football ===
Year	Team	Overall	Conference	Standing	Bowl/playoffs
Augsburg Auggies (Minnesota Intercollegiate Athletic Conference) (1940–1941)
1940	Augsburg	1–5	0–4	8th	
1941	Augsburg	1–6	0–5	8th	
Augsburg Auggies (Minnesota Intercollegiate Athletic Conference) (1946)
1946	Augsburg	1–6	1–5	7th	
Augsburg:		3–17	1–14		
Wichita Shockers (Missouri Valley Conference) (1951–1952)
1951	Wichita	2–7	2–4	T–5th	
1952	Wichita	3–6	0–3	5th	
Wichita:		5–13	2–7		
Total:		8–30–1			
