= Neil Wohlwend =

American football and basketball coach and politician

Biographical details
- Born: May 12, 1913; Barnesville, Minnesota, U.S.
- Died: February 8, 1978 (aged 64)
- Education: Moorhead State

Coaching career (HC unless noted)

Football
- 1938–1941: Frazee HS (MN)
- 1942: Breckenridge HS (MN)
- 1946–1948: Moorhead State

Basketball
- 1943–1944: Moorhead State

Head coaching record
- Overall: 10–12–2 (college football); 5–3 (college basketball)

Neil Edward Wohlwend (May 12, 1913 – February 8, 1978) was an American football and basketball coach and member of the Minnesota House of Representatives.

== Background ==
Wohlwend was born in Barnesville, Minnesota and was involved in the insurance business. He served in the United States Navy and went to graduated school at University of Minnesota.

== Career ==
He served as the head football coach at Minnesota State University at Moorhead from 1946 to 1948 before embarking on a career in politics. Wohlwend served as a Minnesota state representative from 1973 to 1974.

== Head coaching record ==
=== College football ===
Year	Team	Overall	Conference	Standing	Bowl/playoffs
Moorhead State Dragons (Minnesota Teachers College Conference) (1946–1948)
1946	Moorhead State	2–3–2	1–2–1	5th	
1947	Moorhead State	6–2	2–2	T–3rd	
1948	Moorhead State	2–7 (Note: In 1948, Moorhead State forfeited conference wins over St. Cloud State, Bemidji State, and Winona State because of an ineligible player.)	0–5	6th	
Moorhead State:		10–12–2	3–9–1		
Total:		10–12–2			
