= Dave Bassore =

American football player and coach (1954–2006)

Biographical details
- Born: December 29, 1954; Aurora, Missouri, U.S.
- Died: April 3, 2006 (aged 51); Kansas City, Missouri, U.S.

Playing career
- 1973–1976: William Jewell

Coaching career (HC unless noted)
- 1982–1986: Sam Houston State (assistant)
- 1987–1989: Winona State
- 2001–2004: William Jewell
- 2005: Olathe North HS (KS)

Head coaching record
- Overall: 25–48 (college)

David Kent Bassore (September 29, 1954 – April 3, 2006) was an American football coach. He served as the head football coach at Winona State University in Winona, Minnesota from 1987 to 1989 and at his alma mater, William Jewell College in Liberty, Missouri, from 2001 to 2004, compiling a career college football coaching record of 25–48. Bassore was killed in an automobile accident on April 3, 2006, in Kansas City, Missouri.

== Head coaching record ==
=== College ===
Year	Team	Overall	Conference	Standing	Bowl/playoffs
Winona State Warriors (Northern Intercollegiate Conference) (1987–1989)
1987	Winona State	3–8	2–4	5th	
1988	Winona State	3–8	1–5	6th	
1989	Winona State	1–9	0–6	7th	
Winona State:		7–25	3–15		
William Jewell Cardinals (Heart of America Athletic Conference) (2001–2004)
2001	William Jewell	4–6	4–6	8th	
2002	William Jewell	6–5	6–4	5th	
2003	William Jewell	3–7	3–7	9th	
2004	William Jewell	5–5	5–5	T–4th	
William Jewell:		18–23	18–22		
Total:		25–48			
