= 1946 Minnesota Intercollegiate Athletic Conference football season =

- Sport: Football
- Number of teams: 8
- Champion: Gustavus Adolphus

Football seasons
- ← 1945 1947 →

1946 Minnesota Intercollegiate Athletic Conference football standings
	Conf.					Overall
Team	W		L		T	W		L		T
Gustavus Adolphus $	6	–	0	–	0	7	–	0	–	1
St. Olaf	3	–	1	–	0	6	–	2	–	0
St. Thomas (MN)	3	–	1	–	0	4	–	3	–	0
Concordia (MN)	2	–	2	–	0	3	–	3	–	1
Saint John's (MN)	2	–	3	–	0	5	–	3	–	0
Saint Mary's (MN)	1	–	2	–	1	4	–	3	–	1
Augsburg	1	–	5	–	0	1	–	6	–	0
Macalester	0	–	4	–	1	1	–	6	–	1
$ – Conference champion

The 1946 Minnesota Intercollegiate Athletic Conference football season was the season of college football played by the eight member schools of the Minnesota Intercollegiate Athletic Conference (MIAC), sometimes referred to as the Minnesota College Conference, as part of the 1946 college football season.

The Gustavus Adolphus Golden Gusties, in their second season under head coach Lloyd Hollingsworth, won the MIAC championship with a 7–0–1 record (6–0 against MIAC opponents). The Gusties led the conference in scoring offense (23.4 points per game) and defense (6.5 point per game) also dominated the 1946 All-MIAC football team, claiming eight of eleven first-team positions.

== Conference overview ==
Conf. rank	Team	Head coach	Conf. record	Overall record	Points scored	Points against
1	Gustavus Adolphus	Lloyd Hollingsworth	6–0	7–0–1	187	52
2	St. Olaf	Adrian Christianson	3–1	6–2	104	91
3	St. Thomas (MN)	Frank Deig	3–1	4–3	94	70
4	Concordia (MN)	Jake Christiansen	2–2	3–3–1	91	92
5	Saint John's (MN)	Joe Benda	2–3	5–3	131	73
6	Saint Mary's (MN)	Eddie Suech	1–2–1	4–3–1	91	84
7	Augsburg	Bob Carlson	1–5	1–6	26	118
8	Macalester	Dwight Stuessy	0–4–1	1–6–1	25	124

== Teams ==
=== Gustavus Adolphus ===
1946 Gustavus Adolphus Golden Gusties football

MIAC champion
- Conference: Minnesota Intercollegiate Athletic Conference
- Record: 7–0–1 (6–0 MIAC)
- Head coach: Lloyd Hollingsworth (2nd season)

The 1946 Gustavus Adolphus Golden Gusties football team represented Gustavus Adolphus College of St. Peter, Minnesota. In their second, non-consecutive year under head coach Lloyd Hollingsworth, the Gusties compiled a 7–0–1 record (6–0 against MIAC teams), won the MIAC championship, and outscored opponents by a total of 187 to 52.

Gustavus Adolphus players took eight of the eleven first-team spots on the 1946 All-MIAC football team. The Gustavus Adolphus honorees were: back Babe Fiebiger; halfback Bob Collison; fullback Bennie Langsjoen; center Harold Swanson; end William Haldy; tackles Vic Pedersen and Gerald Cady; and guard Keith Skogman.

Date	Opponent	Site	Result	Attendance	Source
September 21	at Augustana (SD)*	Sioux Falls, SD	T 6–6		
September 26	vs. Augsburg	Nicollet Park; Minneapolis, MN	W 32–7	2,000	
October 4	at St. Thomas (MN)	St. Peter, MN	W 25–6		
October 12	at Saint John's (MN)	Collegeville, MN	W 30–14		
October 18	Saint Mary's (MN)	St. Peter, MN	W 33–7		
October 26	Concordia (MN)^{†}	St. Peter, MN	W 26–6		
November 2	at St. Olaf	Northfield, MN	W 21–6	4,000	
November 11	Mankato State*	St. Peter, MN	W 14–0		
*Non-conference game; ^{†}Homecoming

=== St. Olaf ===
1946 St. Olaf Oles football
- Conference: Minnesota Intercollegiate Athletic Conference
- Record: 6–2 (3–1 MIAC)
- Head coach: Adrian Christianson

The 1946 St. Olaf Oles football team represented Gustavus Adolphus College of Northfield, Minnesota. Led by head coach Adrian Christianson, the Oles compiled a 6–2 record (3–1 against MIAC teams), finished in a tie for second place in the MIAC, and outscored opponents by a total of 104 to 91.

Date	Opponent	Site	Result	Attendance	Source
September 21	River Falls State*	Northfield, MN	W 13–6		
September 28	Macalester	Shaw Field; St. Paul, MN	W 19–6		
October 5	Concordia (MN)	Northfield, MN	W 20–0		
October 12	at Luther*	Decorah, IA	W 19–13		
October 19	Carleton*	Northfield, MN	W 14–13	> 6,000	
October 25	at Augsburg	Nicollet Park; Minneapolis, MN	W 7–0	1,500	
November 2	Gustavus Adolphus	Northfield, MN	L 6–21	4,000	
November 8	Minnesota "B" team*	Northfield, MN	L 6–32		
*Non-conference game

=== St. Thomas ===
1946 St. Thomas Tommies football
- Conference: Minnesota Intercollegiate Athletic Conference
- Record: 4–3 (3–1 MIAC)
- Head coach: Frank Deig (1st season)

The 1946 St. Thomas Tommies football team represented the University of St. Thomas of St. Paul, Minnesota. In their first year under head coach Frank Deig, the Tommies compiled a 4–3 record (3–1 against MIAC teams), finished in a tie for second place in the MIAC, and outscored opponents by a total of 94 to 70.

Date	Opponent	Site	Result	Attendance	Source
September 22	Saint Mary's (MN)	Central Stadium; St. Paul, MN	W 14–6	2,000	
September 27	at North Dakota*	Memorial Stadium; Grand Forks, ND	L 6–13	6,000	
October 4	Gustavus Adolphus	St. Peter, MN	L 6–25		
October 12	Macalester	Central Stadium; St. Paul, MN	W 19–6	2,500	
October 20	St. Ambrose*	Central Stadium; St. Paul, MN	L 12–13	3,000	
October 26	Saint John's (MN)^{†}	Central Stadium; St. Paul, MN	W 18–0	3,500	
November 3	at Loras*	Dubuque, IA	W 19–7		
*Non-conference game; ^{†}Homecoming

=== Concordia ===
1946 Concordia Cobbers football
- Conference: Minnesota Intercollegiate Athletic Conference
- Record: 3–3–1 (2–2 MIAC)
- Head coach: Jake Christiansen (6th season)

The 1946 Concordia Cobbers football team represented Concordia College of Moorhead, Minnesota. In their sixth year under head coach Jake Christiansen, the Cobblers compiled a 3–3–1 record (2–2 against MIAC teams), finished in fourth place in the MIAC, and were outscored by a total of 92 to 91.

Date	Opponent	Site	Result	Attendance	Source
September 21	at Moorhead State*	Moorhead, MN	T 7–7		
September 27	at North Dakota Agricultural*	Dacotah Field; Fargo, ND	L 6–26		
October 5	at St. Olaf	Northfield, MN	L 0–20		
October 12	at Valparaiso*	Valparaiso, IN	W 28–7		
October 19	Augsburg^{†}	Moorhead, MN	W 25–0		
October 26	at Gustavus Adolphus	St. Peter, MN	L 6–26		
November 2	Saint John's (MN)	Moorhead, MN	W 19–6		
*Non-conference game; ^{†}Homecoming

=== Saint John's ===
1946 Saint John's Johnnies football
- Conference: Minnesota Intercollegiate Athletic Conference
- Record: 5–3 (2–3 MIAC)
- Head coach: Joe Benda (11th season)

The 1946 Saint John's Johnnies football team represented Saint John's University of Collegeville, Minnesota. In their 11th year under head coach Joe Benda, the Johnnies compiled a 5–3 record (2–4 against MIAC teams), finished in fifth place in the MIAC, and outscored opponents by a total of 131 to 73.

Date	Opponent	Site	Result	Attendance	Source
September 20	at Bemidji State*	Bemidji, MN	W 32–0		
September 28	Loras*	Collegeville, MN	W 27–0		
October 5	Augsburg	Collegeville, MN	W 8–6		
October 12	Gustavus Adolphus	St. Peter, MN	L 14–30		
October 19	Macalester	Collegeville, MN	W 26–0		
October 26	St. Thomas (MN)	Central Stadium; St. Paul, MN	L 0–18	3,500	
November 2	at Concordia (MN)	Moorhead, MN	L 6–19		
November 9	St. Cloud State*	Collegeville, MN	W 18–0		
*Non-conference game

=== Saint Mary's ===
1946 Saint Mary's Redmen football
- Conference: Minnesota Intercollegiate Athletic Conference
- Record: 4–3–1 (1–2–1 MIAC)
- Head coach: Eddie Suech (8th season)

The 1946 Saint Mary's Redmen football team represented Saint Mary's College of Winona, Minnesota. In their eighth year under head coach Eddie Suech, the Redmen compiled a 4–3–1 record (1–2–1 against MIAC teams), finished in sixth place in the MIAC, and outscored opponents by a total of 91 to 84.

Date	Opponent	Site	Result	Attendance	Source
September 22	at St. Thomas (MN)	Central Stadium; St. Paul, MN	L 6–14	2,000	
September 28	La Crosse State*		W 6–0		
October 6	at Canisius*	Buffalo, NY	L 0–31	8,946	
October 12	Augsburg^{†}	Winona, MN	W 33–6		
October 18	at Gustavus Adolphus	St. Peter, MN	L 7–33		
October 27	at Loras*	Dubuque, IA	W 26–0	5,000	
November 2	Winona*	Maxwell Field; Winona, MN	W 13–0		
	Macalester		T 0–0		
*Non-conference game; ^{†}Homecoming

=== Augsburg ===
1946 Augsburg Auggies football
- Conference: Minnesota Intercollegiate Athletic Conference
- Record: 1–6 (1–5 MIAC)
- Head coach: Bob Carlson (3rd season)

The 1946 Augsburg Auggies football team represented Augsburg University of Minneapolis. In their third year under head coach Bob Carlson, the Auggies compiled a 1–6 record (1–5 against MIAC teams), finished in seventh place in the MIAC, and were outscored by a total of 118 to 26.

Date	Opponent	Site	Result	Attendance	Source
September 21	at Mankato State*	Mankato, MN	L 0–13		
September 26	Gustavus Adolphus	Nicollet Park; Minneapolis, MN	L 7–32	2,000	
October 5	at Saint John's (MN)	Collegeville, MN	L 6–8		
	Saint Mary's (MN)		L 6–33		
October 19	Concordia (MN)	Moorhead, MN	L 0–25		
October 25	St. Olaf	Nicollet Park; Minneapolis, MN	L 0–7	1,500	
	Macalester		W 7–0		
*Non-conference game

=== Macalester ===
1946 Macalester Scots football
- Conference: Minnesota Intercollegiate Athletic Conference
- Record: 1–6–1 (0–4–1 MIAC)
- Head coach: Dwight Stuessy (3rd season)

The 1946 Macalester Scots football team represented Macalester College of Saint Paul, Minnesota. In their third year under head coach Dwight Stuessy, the Scots compiled a 1–6–1 record (0–4–1 against MIAC teams), finished in eighth place in the MIAC, and were outscored by a total of 124 to 25.

== All-conference team ==
First team

- Backs: Jack Salscheider, St. Thomas; Babe Fiebiger, Gustavus Adolphus; Bob Collison, Gustavus Adolphus; Beanie Langsjoen, Gustavus Adolphus
- Ends: Ralph Opatz, St. John's; William Haldy, Gustavus Adolphus
- Tackles: Vic Pedersen, Gustavus Adolphus; Gerald Cady, Gustavus Adolphus
- Guards: Stan Tostengaard, St. Olaf; Keith Skogman Gustavus Adolphus
- Center: Harold Swanson, Gustavus Adolphus

Second team

- Backs: Royal Peterson, St. Olaf; Dave Dillon, Augsburg; Charles Miller, St. John's; Ronald Malcolm, Gustavus Adolphus
- Ends: Henry Epstein, St. Mary's; Charles Beck, Concordia
- Tackles: Konnie Prem, St. John's; Eldon Lehrke, St. Olaf
- Guards: Ronald Henricksen, St. Olaf; Clarence Modin, Concordia
- Center: Tony Graham, St. Mary's
