= Eugene Brodhagen =

American football and wrestling coach (1917–1986)

Biographical details
- Born: October 28, 1917; Bonduel, Wisconsin, U.S.
- Died: June 13, 1986 (aged 68); Tomahawk, Wisconsin, U.S.

Playing career

Football
- 1936–1938: Wisconsin

Coaching career (HC unless noted)

Football
- 1939: Grinnell
- 1940–1941: Phillips HS (WI)
- 1946–1950: Winona State
- 1952–1954: Winona State
- 1956–1967: Wisconsin–Stevens Point (DC)

Basketball
- 1940–1942: Phillips HS (WI)

Baseball
- 1941–1942: Phillips HS (WI)

Wrestling
- 1956–1968: Wisconsin–Stevens Point

Head coaching record
- Overall: 19–38–3 (college football)

Accomplishments and honors

Championships
- Football; 1 MSCC (1947)

Eugene Norman Brodhagen (October 28, 1917 – June 13, 1986) was an American football and wrestling coach. He served two stints as the head football coach at Winona State University in Winona, Minnesota, from 1946 to 1950 and again from 1952 to 1954, compiling a record of 19–38–3. Brodhagen played college football at the University of Wisconsin, lettering from 1936 to 1938.

Brodhagen was born on October 28, 1917, in Bonduel, Wisconsin. He began his coaching career in 1939 as an assistant football coach Grinnell College in Grinnell, Iowa, working under head football coach at Guy Lookabaugh. In 1940, he was named head of the athletic department at Phillips High School in Phillips, Wisconsin, where coached football, basketball, and baseball.

Brodhagen served in the United States Navy during World War II, from February 1943 until his discharge in 1945. He remained in the United States Naval Reserve until 1976, when he retired as a lieutentenant commander. He died unexpectedly on June 13, 1986, at his cottage near Tomahawk, Wisconsin.

== Head coaching record ==
=== College football ===
Year	Team	Overall	Conference	Standing	Bowl/playoffs
Winona State Warriors (Minnesota State College Conference) (1946–1950)
1946	Winona State	0–6	0–4	6th	
1947	Winona State	4–3–1	3–1	T–1st	
1948	Winona State	1–7	1–4	T–4th	
1949	Winona State	2–5	1–3	T–4th	
1950	Winona State	2–5	1–3	4th	
Winona State Warriors (State Teacher's College Conference of Minnesota) (1952–1954)
1952	Winona State	1–6–1	1–3	4th	
1953	Winona State	4–4	2–2	T–2nd	
1954	Winona State	5–2–1	2–1–1	2nd	
Winona State:		19–38–3	11–21–1		
Total:		18–39–3			
National championship Conference title Conference division title or championship game berth
