= Pat Cerroni =

American football player and coach

Current position
- Title: Defensive quality control coach
- Team: Kansas
- Conference: Big 12

Biographical details
- Born: c. 1965 (age 60–61)

Playing career
- 1988–1991: Carroll (WI)

Coaching career (HC unless noted)
- c. 1990: Arrowhead HS (WI) (assistant)
- c. 1995: Catholic Memorial HS (WI) (assistant)
- 1997–1999: Menomonee Falls HS (WI)
- 2000–2006: Wisconsin–Oshkosh (assistant)
- 2007–2021: Wisconsin–Oshkosh
- 2022–2023: Dothan HS (AL) (assistant)
- 2024–present: Kansas (DQC)

Head coaching record
- Overall: 109–45 (college)
- Tournaments: 12–5 (NCAA D-III playoffs)

Accomplishments and honors

Championships
- 4 WIAC (2002, 2015, 2017, 2019)

Pat Cerroni (born c. 1965) is an American college football coach. He is a defensive quality control coach for the University of Kansas, a position he has held since 2024. He was the head football coach at the University of Wisconsin–Oshkosh from 2007 to 2021, compiling a record of 109–45. Cerroni was named interim head coach at Wisconsin–Oshkosh in January 2007. The interim tag was removed in December of that year. He grew up near Johnson Creek, Wisconsin.

== Head coaching record ==
=== College ===
Year	Team	Overall	Conference	Standing	Bowl/playoffs	D3^{#}
Wisconsin–Oshkosh Titans (Wisconsin Intercollegiate Athletic Conference) (2007–2021)
2007	Wisconsin–Oshkosh	7–3	4–3	3rd		
2008	Wisconsin–Oshkosh	4–5	2–5	T–6th		
2009	Wisconsin–Oshkosh	4–6	2–5	T–5th		
2010	Wisconsin–Oshkosh	4–6	3–4	T–4th		
2011	Wisconsin–Oshkosh	7–3	5–2	T–2nd		
2012	Wisconsin–Oshkosh	13–1	7–0	1st	L NCAA Division III Semifinal	4
2013	Wisconsin–Oshkosh	8–2	5–2	3rd		11
2014	Wisconsin–Oshkosh	6–4	6–1	2nd		20
2015	Wisconsin–Oshkosh	11–2	7–0	1st	L NCAA Division III Quarterfinal	5
2016	Wisconsin–Oshkosh	13–2	6–1	2nd	L NCAA Division III Championship	2
2017	Wisconsin–Oshkosh	12–1	7–0	1st	L NCAA Division III Semifinal	3
2018	Wisconsin–Oshkosh	6–4	4–3	3rd		
2019	Wisconsin–Oshkosh	8–3	6–1	T–1st	L NCAA Division III First Round	22
2020–21	No team—COVID-19					
2021	Wisconsin–Oshkosh	6–3	4–3	4th		
Wisconsin–Oshkosh:		109–45	58–32			
Total:		109–45				
National championship Conference title Conference division title or championship game berth
