= Lloyd Hollingsworth =

American athletics coach

Biographical details
- Born: October 23, 1911
- Died: August 9, 2004 (aged 92); St. Peter, Minnesota, U.S.

Playing career

Football
- c. 1935: Gustavus Adolphus

Baseball
- c. 1935: Gustavus Adolphus

Gymnastics
- c. 1935: Gustavus Adolphus

Coaching career (HC unless noted)

Football
- 1942: Gustavus Adolphus
- 1946–1950: Gustavus Adolphus
- 1952–1960: Gustavus Adolphus

Basketball
- 1942–1943: Gustavus Adolphus

Baseball
- 1943: Gustavus Adolphus
- 1946–1947: Gustavus Adolphus

Ice hockey
- 1953–1956: Gustavus Adolphus

Administrative career (AD unless noted)
- 1942–1974: Gustavus Adolphus

Head coaching record
- Overall: 94–33–5 (football); 11–8 (basketball); 17–18 (baseball); 17–14 (ice hockey)
- Bowls: 0–1
- Tournaments: Football; 0–1 (NAIA playoffs)

Accomplishments and honors

Championships
- Football; 8 MIAC (1946, 1950, 1952–1955, 1958–1959)

Lloyd E. "Holly" Hollingsworth (October 23, 1911 – August 9, 2004) was an American football, basketball, baseball, ice hockey, tennis, and gymnastics coach. He served three stints as the head football coach at Gustavus Adolphus College in St. Peter, Minnesota, in 1942, from 1946 to 1950, and from 1952 to 1960, compiling a record of 94–33–5. His tenure was interrupted by service in the United States Navy during World War II and the United States Army during the Korean War.

Hollingsworth attended Roosevelt High School in Minneapolis, Minnesota. He moved on to Gustavus Adolphus, where he earned 11 varsity letters in football, baseball, and gymnastics. After graduating in 1936, he coached as high schools in Clinton, Madison, and Waseca, Minnesota. He returned to Gustavus Adolphus in 1942 as athletic director and head coach in football, basketball, and baseball. Hollingsworth resigned as athletic director at Gustavus Adolphus in 1974 and retired from his post of chairman of the school's Department of Health and Physical Education in 1978.

Hollingsworth earned a master's degree from the University of Minnesota and a doctorate in education from New York University (NYU) in 1958. He died on August 9, 2004.

== Head coaching record ==
=== Football ===
| Year | Team | Overall | Conference | Standing | Bowl/playoffs |
|---|---|---|---|---|---|
Gustavus Adolphus Gusties (Minnesota Intercollegiate Athletic Conference) (1942)
| 1942 | Gustavus Adolphus | 5–3 | 2–2 | 5th | |
Gustavus Adolphus Gusties (Minnesota Intercollegiate Athletic Conference) (1946–1950)
| 1946 | Gustavus Adolphus | 7–0–1 | 6–0 | 1st | |
| 1947 | Gustavus Adolphus | 7–1–1 | 4–1 | 3rd | |
| 1948 | Gustavus Adolphus | 7–1–1 | 4–1 | T–2nd | |
| 1949 | Gustavus Adolphus | 8–1 | 5–1 | 2nd | |
| 1950 | Gustavus Adolphus | 9–2 | 6–0 | 1st | L Refrigerator |
Gustavus Adolphus Gusties (Minnesota Intercollegiate Athletic Conference) (1952–1950)
| 1952 | Gustavus Adolphus | 7–1 | 6–0 | T–1st | |
| 1953 | Gustavus Adolphus | 6–2 | 5–1 | T–1st | |
| 1954 | Gustavus Adolphus | 7–2 | 6–0 | 1st | |
| 1955 | Gustavus Adolphus | 5–3 | 5–1 | 1st | |
| 1956 | Gustavus Adolphus | 4–5 | 4–3 | T–3rd | |
| 1957 | Gustavus Adolphus | 5–3–1 | 5–1–1 | T–2nd | |
| 1958 | Gustavus Adolphus | 8–1 | 7–0 | 1st | L NAIA Semifinal |
| 1959 | Gustavus Adolphus | 8–1 | 7–0 | 1st | |
| 1960 | Gustavus Adolphus | 3–5–1 | 3–3–1 | T–5th | |
| Gustavus Adolphus: | | 63–20–6 | 49–17–3 | | |
| Total: | | 62–20–6 | | | |
National championship Conference title Conference division title or championship game berth
