= Tom Sawyer (American football) =

American football coach

Playing career
- c. 1982: Winona State
- Positions: Linebacker, punter

Coaching career (HC unless noted)
- 1987–1989: Winona State (assistant)
- 1991–1994: Winona State (assistant)
- 1996–2021: Winona State

Head coaching record
- Overall: 197–89
- Bowls: 2–2
- Tournaments: 1–6 (NCAA D-II playoffs)

Accomplishments and honors

Championships
- 8 NSIC (1997–1998, 2000–2001, 2003–2005, 2007); 2 NSIC South Division (2010, 2012)

Tom Sawyer is an American former college football coach. He served as the head football coach at Winona State University in Winona, Minnesota, from 1996 to 2021, compiling a record of 197–89. A native of Barron, Wisconsin, Sawyer played college football at Winona State, lettering for four years as a linebacker and punter. He retired after the 2021 season.

== Head coaching record ==
Year	Team	Overall	Conference	Standing	Bowl/playoffs	NCAA^{#}	AFCA^{°}
Winona State Warriors (Northern Sun Intercollegiate Conference) (1996–2021)
1996	Winona State	4–7	3–3	4th			
1997	Winona State	9–2	6–0	1st			
1998	Winona State	9–2	6–0	1st		20	
1999	Winona State	7–4	6–2	T–2nd			
2000	Winona State	9–3	7–1	1st	W Mineral Water		
2001	Winona State	10–2	9–0	1st	L NCAA Division II First Round		13
2002	Winona State	8–4	8–1	2nd	L Mineral Water		
2003	Winona State	11–2	7–1	T–1st	L NCAA Division II Quarterfinal		9
2004	Winona State	10–2	7–0	1st	L NCAA Division II First Round		13
2005	Winona State	8–3	6–1	T–1st			
2006	Winona State	9–3	7–1	2nd	L NCAA Division II First Round		19
2007	Winona State	10–2	9–0	1st	L NCAA Division II First Round		23
2008	Winona State	6–5	6–4 / 3–3	T–6th / T–4th (South)			
2009	Winona State	7–4	6–4 / 4–2	7th / T–2nd (South)			
2010	Winona State	7–4	6–4 / 5–1	T–5th / T–1st (South)			
2011	Winona State	7–4	7–3 / 4–2	T–4th / T–2nd (South)			
2012	Winona State	10–2	9–2 / 6–1	T–2nd / 1st (South)	W Mineral Water		
2013	Winona State	6–5	6–5 / 4–3	T–5th / T–3rd (South)			
2014	Winona State	4–7	4–7 / 1–6	12th / 8th (South)			
2015	Winona State	5–6	5–6 / 3–4	11th / T–5th (South)			
2016	Winona State	8–3	8–3 / 5–2	T–3rd / T–2nd (South)			
2017	Winona State	10–2	10–1 / 6–1	2nd / 2nd (South)	L NCAA Division II First Round		15
2018	Winona State	8–3	8–3 / 5–2	T–3rd / T–2nd (South)			
2019	Winona State	8–4	8–3 / 4–3	T–3rd / T–3rd (South)	L Mineral Water		
2020–21	No team—COVID-19						
2021	Winona State	7–4	7–4 / 4–2	T–5th / 3rd (South)			
Winona State:		197–89	171–59				
Total:		197–89					
National championship Conference title Conference division title or championship game berth
