= Lloyd Peterson =

American sports coach (1900–1986)

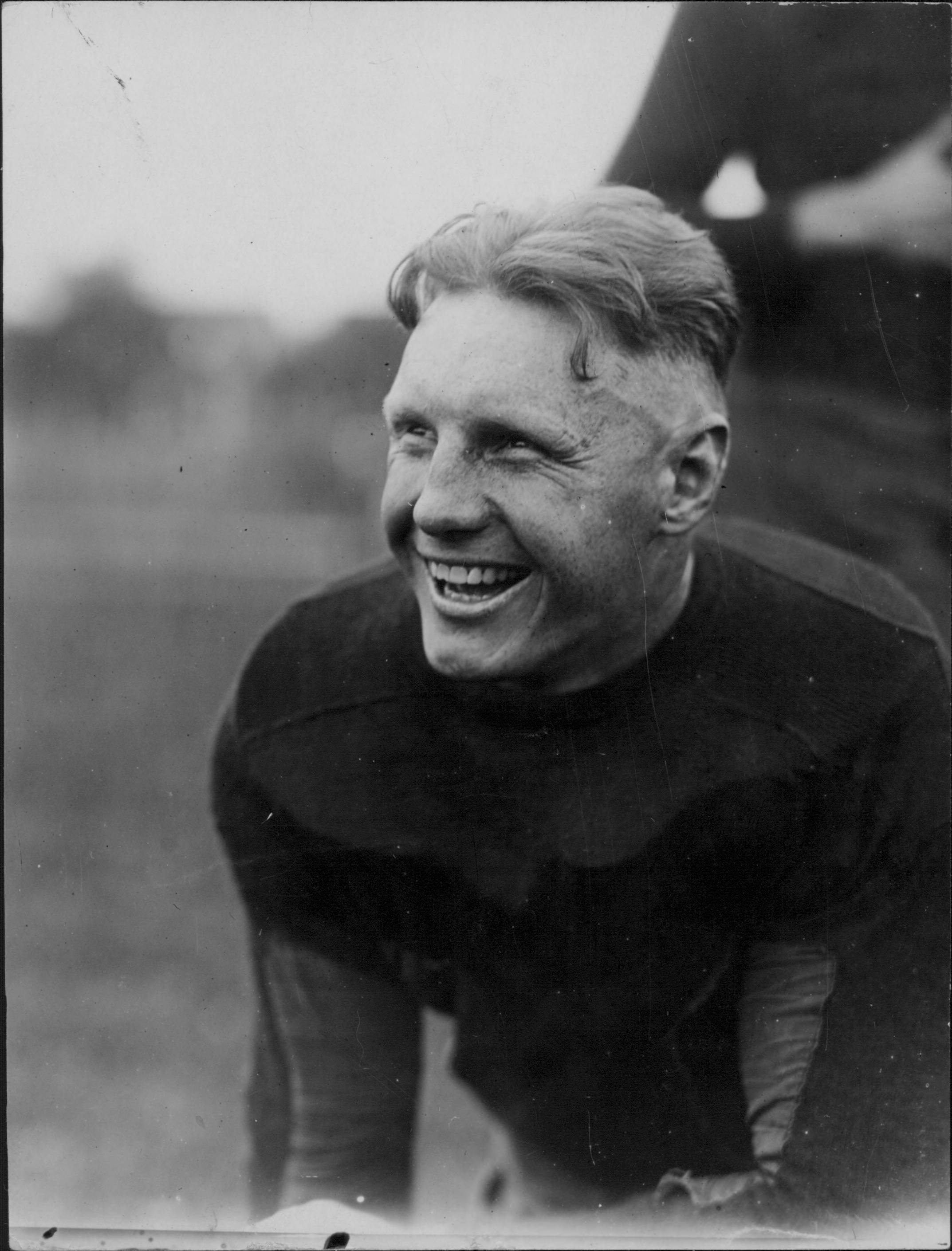

Biographical details
- Born: August 16, 1900; Willmar, Minnesota, U.S.
- Died: September 22, 1986 (aged 86); Duluth, Minnesota, U.S.

Playing career

Football
- 1922–1924: Minnesota
- Position: Fullback

Coaching career (HC unless noted)

Football
- 1925: Owatonna HS (MN)
- 1926–1930: University HS (MN)
- 1931–1957: Duluth State / Minnesota–Duluth

Basketball
- 1932–1943: Duluth State

Wrestling
- 1966–1968: Minnesota–Duluth

Administrative career (AD unless noted)
- 1955–1969: Minnesota–Duluth

Head coaching record
- Overall: 84–76–9 (college football); 105–70 (college basketball)

Accomplishments and honors

Championships
- Football; 6 NTAC/MSCC (1932, 1934, 1937–1938, 1946, 1948)

Lloyd William Peterson (August 16, 1900 – September 22, 1986) was an American college football, basketball, and wrestling coach. He served as the head football coach at the University of Minnesota Duluth from 1931 to 1957, compiling a record of 84–76–9. Peterson was also the head basketball coach at Minnesota–Duluth from 1932 to 1943 and the school's athletic director from 1955 until his retirement in 1969.

Peterson played college football at the University of Minnesota as a fullback from 1922 to 1924 before graduating in 1925. He coached football for one year at Owatonna High School in Owatonna, Minnesota and then five years at University High School in Minneapolis before he was hired at Minnesota Duluth.

Peterson died on September 22, 1986, at his home in Duluth, Minnesota.

== Head coaching record ==
Year	Team	Overall	Conference	Standing	Bowl/playoffs
Duluth State Bulldogs (Independent) (1931)
1931	Duluth State	1–5			
Duluth State Bulldogs (Northern Teachers Athletic Conference / Minnesota State College Conference) (1932–1948)
1932	Duluth State	3–3	2–1	T–1st	
1933	Duluth State	3–3–1	2–1–1	3rd	
1934	Duluth State	6–1	3–1	1st	
1935	Duluth State	4–2	2–2	3rd	
1936	Duluth State	4–1	2–1	T–2nd	
1937	Duluth State	5–2	3–0	1st	
1938	Duluth State	7–0–1	3–0	T–1st	
1939	Duluth State	5–1–1	3–1	T–2nd	
1940	Duluth State	2–5	2–3	T–4th	
1941	Duluth State	1–6	1–4	5th	
1942	Duluth State	2–3–1	2–3	4th	
1943	No team—World War II				
1944	No team—World War II				
1945	No team—World War II				
1946	Duluth State	4–1–2	2–0–2	T–1st	
1947	Minnesota–Duluth	3–4	1–3	T–5th	
1948	Minnesota–Duluth	4–3	4–1	T–1st	
Minnesota–Duluth Bulldogs (Independent) (1949)
1949	Minnesota–Duluth	4–3			
Minnesota–Duluth Bulldogs (Minnesota Intercollegiate Athletic Conference) (1950–1957)
1950	Minnesota–Duluth	4–3	3–3	T–5th	
1951	Minnesota–Duluth	5–2–1	5–1	T–2nd	
1952	Minnesota–Duluth	0–7–1	0–6	9th	
1953	Minnesota–Duluth	3–4	3–3	T–5th	
1954	Minnesota–Duluth	5–3	4–2	T–3rd	
1955	Minnesota–Duluth	3–5	1–5	7th	
1956	Minnesota–Duluth	4–4	3–4	5th	
1957	Minnesota–Duluth	2–5–1	2–5	6th	
Duluth State / Minnesota–Duluth:		84–76–9	53–50–3		
Total:		84–76–9			
National championship Conference title Conference division title or championship game berth
