= Fran Polsfoot =

American football player and coach (1927–1985)

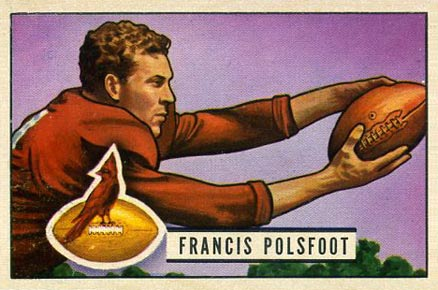
- Polsfoot on a 1951 Bowman football card

No. 41, 81, 82
- Position: End

Personal information
- Born: April 19, 1927; Montesano, Washington, U.S.
- Died: April 5, 1985 (aged 57); Denver, Colorado, U.S.
- Listed height: 6 ft 3 in (1.91 m)
- Listed weight: 203 lb (92 kg)

Career information
- High school: Montesano
- College: Washington State
- NFL draft: 1950: 3rd round, 35th overall pick

Career history

Playing
- Chicago Cardinals (1950–1952); Washington Redskins (1953)

Coaching
- River Falls State (1954–1956) Assistant; River Falls State (1957–1961) Head coach; St. Louis Cardinals (1962–1967) Wide receiver; Houston Oilers (1968–1971) Wide receiver; Cleveland Browns (1972–1974) Wide receiver; Houston Oilers (1975–1976) Wide receiver; Denver Broncos (1977–1980) Wide receiver; Denver Broncos (1981) Tight end; Denver Broncos (1982–1984) Tight end/special teams

Awards and highlights
- Pro Bowl (1951); Second-team All-PCC (1948)

Career NFL statistics
- Receptions: 106
- Receiving yards: 1,613
- Touchdowns: 10
- Stats at Pro Football Reference

Francis Charles Polsfoot (April 19, 1927 – April 5, 1985) was an American professional football player and coach. He played professionally as an end in the National Football League (NFL) with the Chicago Cardinals from 1950 to 1952 and the Washington Redskins in 1953. Polsfoot played college football at Washington State and was drafted in the third round of the 1950 NFL draft. He caught 57 passes in the 1951 season for the Chicago Cardinals and was selected to the Pro Bowl.

After Polsfoot suffered a knee injury and was forced to retire following the 1953 season, he started his coaching career at the University of Wisconsin–River Falls. In 1962, he returned to the NFL as an assistant coach with the St. Louis Cardinals. Polsfoot later coached with the Houston Oilers, Cleveland Browns and Denver Broncos. His NFL coaching career lasted over 20 years and he was an assistant coach for the Broncos in Super Bowl XII.

Polsfoot was also a high hurdle champion for Washington State.

Polsfoot was married to Mary Eileen (née Hesterman) and the couple had two children, Sally Baldwin and Thomas Polsfoot. He had a brother, Curtis Frederic Polsfoot, and a sister, Bea Polsfoot. Both Francis and Curt served in the United States Merchant Marine during World War II. Polsfoot died on April 5, 1985, after suffering from brain cancer.

== Head coaching record ==
=== Football ===
Year	Team	Overall	Conference	Standing	Bowl/playoffs
River Falls State Falcons (Wisconsin State College Conference) (1957–1961)
1957	River Falls State	6–2	4–1	2nd	
1958	River Falls State	7–2	6–0	1st	
1959	River Falls State	2–6–1	2–4–1	T–7th	
1960	River Falls State	2–6–1	1–4–1	T–8th	
1961	River Falls State	5–4	4–2	3rd	
River Falls State:		22–20–2	17–11–2		
Total:		22–20–2			
National championship Conference title Conference division title or championship game berth
