= Mertz Mortorelli =

American football coach (1921–1985)

Biographical details
- Born: March 3, 1921; Ironwood, Michigan, U.S.
- Died: July 1, 1985 (aged 64); Superior, Wisconsin, U.S.

Playing career

Football
- c. 1945: Superior State

Coaching career (HC unless noted)

Football
- 1954–1969: Superior State
- 1975–1983: Wisconsin–Superior

Administrative career (AD unless noted)
- 1954–1985: Superior State / Wisconsin–Superior

Head coaching record
- Overall: 52–176–13 (college football)

Americo J. "Mertz" Mortorelli (March 3, 1921 – July 1, 1985) was an American college football coach. He served as the head football coach at the University of Wisconsin–Superior from 1954 to 1969 and from 1975 to 1983, compiling a record of 52–176–13. Mortorelli attended Wisconsin–Superior when it was known as Superior State Teachers College, lettering in football, basketball, and boxing. In 1949 he received master's degrees in education and physical education from the University of Wisconsin–Madison. At Wisconsin–Superior, Mortorelli also coached wrestling, basketball, tennis, golf, and track. He died on July 1, 1985, in Superior, Wisconsin, after suffering a heart attack.

== Head coaching record ==
=== College ===
| Year | Team | Overall | Conference | Standing | Bowl/playoffs |
|---|---|---|---|---|---|
Superior State Yellowjackets (Wisconsin State College Conference / Wisconsin State University Athletic Conference) (1954–1969)
| 1954 | Superior State | 3–5 | 0–5 | T–9th | |
| 1955 | Superior State | 0–7–2 | 0–4–1 | T–8th | |
| 1956 | Superior State | 4–5 | 2–3 | T–5th | |
| 1957 | Superior State | 4–4–1 | 2–3 | T–6th | |
| 1958 | Superior State | 3–6 | 1–5 | T–8th | |
| 1959 | Superior State | 4–3–2 | 3–1–2 | 3rd | |
| 1960 | Superior State | 2–5–2 | 1–4–1 | T–8th | |
| 1961 | Superior State | 3–4–2 | 2–3–1 | T–5th | |
| 1962 | Superior State | 7–1–1 | 4–1–1 | 2nd | |
| 1963 | Superior State | 5–4 | 4–2 | 4th | |
| 1964 | Superior State | 3–6 | 3–3 | 5th | |
| 1965 | Superior State | 0–9 | 0–6 | 9th | |
| 1966 | Superior State | 1–8 | 1–7 | 9th | |
| 1967 | Superior State | 3–6 | 3–5 | 6th | |
| 1968 | Superior State | 0–9–1 | 0–7–1 | 9th | |
| 1969 | Superior State | 2–8 | 3–6 | T–7th | |
Wisconsin–Superior Yellowjackets (Wisconsin State University Athletic Conference) (1975–1983)
| 1975 | Wisconsin–Superior | 1–9 | 0–8 | 9th | |
| 1976 | Wisconsin–Superior | 0–10 | 0–8 | 9th | |
| 1977 | Wisconsin–Superior | 2–9 | 1–7 | 9th | |
| 1978 | Wisconsin–Superior | 1–8–2 | 1–7 | 9th | |
| 1979 | Wisconsin–Superior | 1–10 | 0–8 | 9th | |
| 1980 | Wisconsin–Superior | 0–10 | 0–8 | 9th | |
| 1981 | Wisconsin–Superior | 0–11 | 0–8 | 9th | |
| 1982 | Wisconsin–Superior | 2–9 | 1–7 | T–8th | |
| 1983 | Wisconsin–Superior | 1–10 | 0–8 | 9th | |
| Wisconsin–Superior: | | 52–176–13 | 32–134–7 | | |
| Total: | | 52–176–13 | | | |
