= Arthur Meier =

Arthur Meier may refer to:

- Dutch Meier (Arthur Ernst Meier, 1879–1948), American baseball player
- Arthur Meier (cross-country skier) (1925–2016), Liechtenstein cross-country skier

== See also ==
- Arthur Meyer (disambiguation)
- Arthur Myers (disambiguation)
