= Hjalmer J. Erickson =

American football and basketball coach

Biographical details
- Born: January 7, 1906; Moorhead, Minnesota, U.S.
- Died: February 6, 1959 (aged 53); Beltrami County, Minnesota, U.S.

Coaching career (HC unless noted)

Football
- 1938–1954: Bemidji State

Basketball
- 1944–1946: Bemidji State

Head coaching record
- Overall: 54–54–5 (football); 23–6 (basketball)

Accomplishments and honors

Championships
- 2 MSCC (1947, 1950)

Hjalmer J. "Jolly" Erickson (January 7, 1906 – February 6, 1959) was an American football and basketball coach. He served as the head football coach at Bemidji State Teachers College in Bemidji, Minnesota from 1938 to 1954, compiling a record of 54–54–5. He was also the school's head basketball coach from 1944 to 1946, tallying a mark of 23–6.

== Head coaching record ==
=== Football ===
Year	Team	Overall	Conference	Standing	Bowl/playoffs
Bemidji State Beavers (Northern Teachers Athletic Conference / Minnesota State College Conference) (1938–1954)
1938	Bemidji State	1–5	0–4	6th	
1939	Bemidji State	3–3–1	1–3–1	4th	
1940	Bemidji State	4–2–1	3–2	3rd	
1941	Bemidji State	6–2	3–2	3rd	
1942	Bemidji State	3–4	2–2	T–3rd	
1943	Bemidji State	1–1			
1944	Bemidji State	4–0			
1945	Bemidji State	3–4			
1946	Bemidji State	3–4	2–2	T–3rd	
1947	Bemidji State	4–3	3–1	T–1st	
1948	Bemidji State	3–5	1–4	T–4th	
1949	Bemidji State	4–3–1	2–1–1	T–2nd	
1950	Bemidji State	5–1–1	3–0–1	T–1st	
1951	Bemidji State	6–2	3–1	2nd	
1952	Bemidji State	2–4	0–4	5th	
1953	Bemidji State	1–6	1–3	T–4th	
1954	Bemidji State	1–5–1	0–3–1	5th	
Bemidji State:		54–54–5	24–32–4		
Total:		54–54–5			
National championship Conference title Conference division title or championship game berth
