= Phillips High School (Phillips, Wisconsin) =

- U.S. National Register of Historic Places
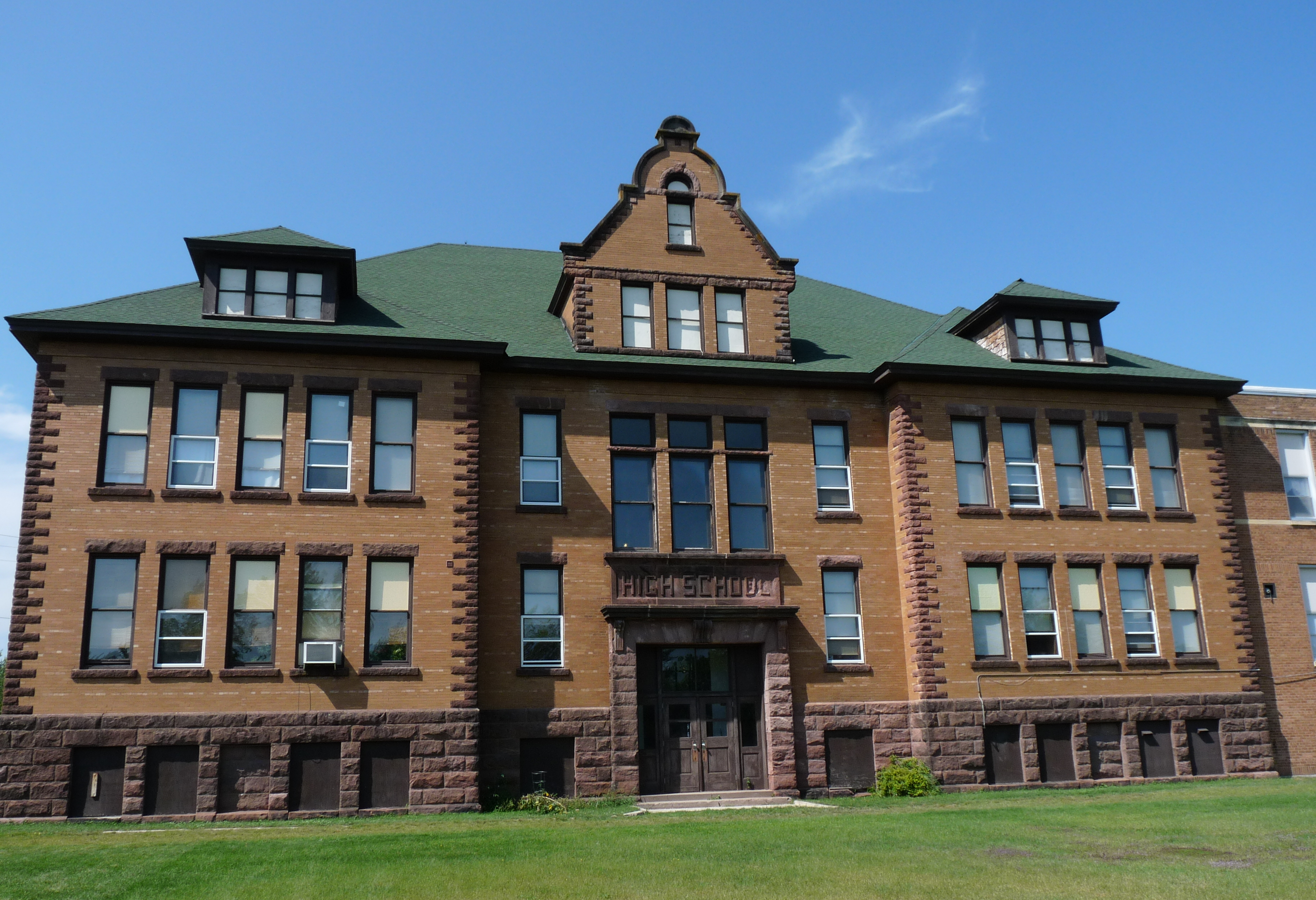
- Phillips High School
- Location: 300 Cherry St. Phillips, Wisconsin
- Coordinates: 45.68943°N 90.40076°W
- Architect: Henry Wildhagen
- Architectural style: Romanesque Revival
- NRHP reference No.: 95000156
- Added to NRHP: February 24, 1995

Phillips High School was a public high school in Phillips, Wisconsin. The original three-story block was built in 1907 and the Public Works Administration added the gymnasium section in 1937. The building was added to the National Register of Historic Places in 1995.

== History ==
The building stopped being used as a high school in 1972 after the construction of a new one. It now serves as an apartment building.

== Notable alumni ==
- Adolph Bieberstein (1902–1981), American football guard and attorney
- Frank Boyle (born 1945), retired Democratic politician
- Eugene Brodhagen (1917–1986), American football and wrestling coach
- Clayton Hicks (1919–1999), member of the Wisconsin State Senate (1949–1953)
- Willis J. Hutnik (1915–1996), member of the Wisconsin State Assembly (1954–1970)
