= Joe Benda =

American sports coach (1905–1950)

Biographical details
- Born: March 20, 1905; Minnesota, U.S.
- Died: June 20, 1950 (aged 45); Collegeville, Minnesota, U.S.

Playing career

Football
- 1925–1927: Notre Dame
- Position: End

Coaching career (HC unless noted)

Football
- 1929: Duluth Cathedral HS (MN)
- 1930–1936: Saint John's (MN)
- 1937–1940: Notre Dame (ends)
- 1941–1942: Saint John's (MN)
- 1944: Cleveland Rams (assistant)
- 1945–1949: Saint John's (MN)

Basketball
- 1930–1948: Saint John's (MN)

Baseball
- 1945: Saint John's (MN)

Head coaching record
- Overall: 57–32–8 (college football); 68–152 (college basketball); 2–4 (college baseball)

Accomplishments and honors

Championships
- 3 MIAC (1932, 1935–1936)

Joseph Francis Benda (March 20, 1905 – June 20, 1950) was an American football, basketball and baseball coach.

He served three stints head football coach at Saint John's University in Collegeville, Minnesota, from 1930 to 1936, 1941 to 1942, and 1945 to 1949, compiling a record of 57–32–8. Benda was also the school's head basketball coach and head baseball coach.

Benda played college football at the University of Notre Dame in South Bend, Indiana, lettering three years from 1925 to 1927. He came St. John's after spending a year as the head coach at his old high school, leading Central to a 7–1 finish in 1929. He inherited a Johnnies' squad that finished 0–6 the year before. St. John's finished 1–4–1 in 1930, including an 82–0 loss at St. Olaf.

Benda died on June 20, 1950, in Collegeville, after suffering from Hodgkin's lymphoma.

== Head coaching record ==
=== College football ===
Year	Team	Overall	Conference	Standing	Bowl/playoffs
Saint John's Johnnies (Minnesota Intercollegiate Athletic Conference) (1930–1936)
1930	Saint John's	1–4–1	0–3–1	T–6th	
1931	Saint John's	4–2–1	3–2	4th	
1932	Saint John's	6–0–1	4–0–1	1st	
1933	Saint John's	3–3–2	1–2–2	7th	
1934	Saint John's	5–1–1	2–1–1	T–4th	
1935	Saint John's	5–0–1	3–0–1	T–1st	
1936	Saint John's	5–2	4–0	T–1st	
Saint John's Johnnies (Minnesota Intercollegiate Athletic Conference) (1941–1942)
1941	Saint John's	3–4	1–3	7th	
1942	Saint John's	4–1–1	4–1–1	3rd	
Saint John's Johnnies (Minnesota Intercollegiate Athletic Conference) (1945–1949)
1945	Saint John's	1–6	1–4	5th	
1946	Saint John's	5–3	2–3	5th	
1947	Saint John's	3–2	3–2	T–4th	
1948	Saint John's	6–2	3–2	4th	
1949	Saint John's	6–2	4–2	3rd	
Saint John's:		57–32–8	10–7		
Total:		57–32–8			
National championship Conference title Conference division title or championship game berth
