= Arthur Meyer (American football) =

American football and basketball player and coach

Biographical details
- Born: February 2, 1890

Playing career

Football
- 1907–1911: Marquette

Basketball
- 1909–1911: Marquette

Coaching career (HC unless noted)
- 1912–1917: Oshkosh Normal

Head coaching record
- Overall: 12–25–1

Arthur E. Meyer (born February 2, 1890) was an American college football and basketball player and coach. He served as the head football coach at Wisconsin State Normal School at Oshkosh—now known as the University of Wisconsin–Oshkosh—from 1912 to 1917, compiling a record of 12–25–1. Meyer played college football at Marquette University under head coach William Juneau.

== Head coaching record ==
Year	Team	Overall	Conference	Standing	Bowl/playoffs
Oshkosh Normal Titans (Independent) (1912)
1912	Oshkosh Normal	5–1			
Oshkosh Normal Titans (Inter-Normal Athletic Conference of Wisconsin) (1913–1917)
1913	Oshkosh Normal	1–5	1–2	T–5th	
1914	Oshkosh Normal	2–5	1–2	T–5th	
1915	Oshkosh Normal	2–5	1–2	T–5th	
1916	Oshkosh Normal	0–5	0–3	T–8th	
1917	Oshkosh Normal	2–4–1	1–2	8th	
Oshkosh Normal:		12–25–1	4–11		
Total:		12–25–1			
