= Frank Conroy (American football) =

Biographical details
- Born: c. 1939
- Died: March 29, 2016 (aged 76)

Playing career
- c. 1960: East Stroudsburg
- c. 1965: Winona State

Coaching career (HC unless noted)
- 1976–1977: Winona State

Head coaching record
- Overall: 4–16

Frank A. Conroy (c. 1939 – March 29, 2016) was an American football coach. He served as the head football coach at Winona State University in Winona, Minnesota from 1976 to 1977, compiling a record of 4–16.

A native of Langhorne, Pennsylvania, Conroy attended East Stroudsburg State College—now known as the East Stroudsburg University of Pennsylvania—where he played college football for two years. He left East Stroudsburg to serve in the United States Army, playing for the U.S. Army All-Star team while stationed in Germany. After three years in the Army, Conroy went to Winona State, where he played for a year on the football team before earning undergraduate and graduate degrees in health and physical education. Conroy spent eight years as a teacher and assistant football coach in Pennsauken Public Schools district in Pennsauken Township, New Jersey and Neshaminy School District in his hometown of Langhorne, Pennsylvania. He returned to Winona State in 1975 to work as a residence hall director before he was hired in March 1976 to succeed Bob Keister as head football coach.

== Head coaching record ==
=== College ===
Year	Team	Overall	Conference	Standing	Bowl/playoffs
Winona State Warriors (Northern Intercollegiate Conference) (1976–1977)
1976	Winona State	1–9	1–6	7th	
1977	Winona State	3–7	1–6	T–6th	
Winona State:		4–16	2–12		
Total:		4–16			
