= Cliff Fagan =

American basketball official

Clifford B. Fagan (March 3, 1911 – January 18, 1995) was a high school basketball referee who became executive director of the National Federation of State High School Athletic Associations (NFHS) and eventually president of the Basketball Hall of Fame and board member for FIBA, the international governing body for the sport of basketball. He was born in Mankato, Minnesota.

For his contributions to the sport of basketball, including his service as a member of the board of directors for the United States Olympic Committee, Fagan was inducted into the Basketball Hall of Fame as a contributor in 1984. He was awarded the FIBA Order of Merit, in 1994.
