= Peter Jennings (American football) =

American football coach (born c. 1984)

Current position
- Title: Head coach
- Team: Wisconsin–Oshkosh
- Conference: WIAC
- Record: 23–17

Biographical details
- Born: c. 1984 (age 41–42); Fort Madison, Iowa, U.S.
- Education: Walden University (2007, 2009)

Playing career
- 2003: Bemidji State
- 2004–2007: Illinois College
- Position: Quarterback

Coaching career (HC unless noted)
- 2008–2011: Iowa Wesleyan (OC)
- 2012: Carroll (WI) (QB)
- 2013–2015: Carroll (WI) (OC)
- 2016: Rhodes (OC/WR)
- 2017: Rhodes (OC/QB)
- 2018–2021: Wisconsin–Whitewater (OC/QB)
- 2022–present: Wisconsin–Oshkosh

Head coaching record
- Overall: 23–17

Peter Jennings (born c. 1984) is an American college football coach. He is the head football coach for the University of Wisconsin–Oshkosh, a position he has held since 2022. He also coached for Iowa Wesleyan, Carroll, Rhodes, and Wisconsin–Whitewater. He played college football for Bemidji State and Illinois College as a quarterback.

== Head coaching record ==
Year	Team	Overall	Conference	Standing	Bowl/playoffs	D3^{#}	AFCA^{°}
Wisconsin–Oshkosh Titans (Wisconsin Intercollegiate Athletic Conference) (2022–present)
2022	Wisconsin–Oshkosh	6–4	4–3	T–3rd			
2023	Wisconsin–Oshkosh	6–4	4–3	T–3rd			
2024	Wisconsin–Oshkosh	6–4	4–3	T–3rd		19	23
2025	Wisconsin–Oshkosh	5–5	3–4	T–5th			
2026	Wisconsin–Oshkosh	0–0	0–0				
Wisconsin–Oshkosh:		23–17	15–13				
Total:		23–17					
