= Lester Leitl =

American football player and coach (1899–1980)

Biographical details
- Born: August 19, 1899; Sturgeon Bay, Wisconsin, U.S.
- Died: October 14, 1980 (aged 81); Dubuque, Iowa, U.S.

Playing career

Football
- 1919–1921: Wisconsin–Oshkosh
- 1924–1926: Wisconsin
- Position: Tackle

Coaching career (HC unless noted)

Football
- 1927–1963: Wisconsin–Platteville

Basketball
- 1930–1943: Wisconsin–Platteville

Administrative career (AD unless noted)
- 1927–1964: Wisconsin–Platteville

Head coaching record
- Overall: 88–99–15 (football); 48–98 (basketball)

Accomplishments and honors

Awards
- Wisconsin–Oshkosh Hall of Fame (1975)

Lester J. "Butch" Leitl (August 19, 1899 – October 14, 1980) was an American college football player and coach. He served as the head football coach at the University of Wisconsin–Platteville from 1927 to 1963, compiling a record of 88–99–15.

Leitl was inducted into the University of Wisconsin–Oshkosh athletics Hall of Fame in 1975 as an athlete. He died on October 14, 1980, at a hospital in Dubuque, Iowa.
