= Wisconsin–Oshkosh Titans football =

D3 College Football Team

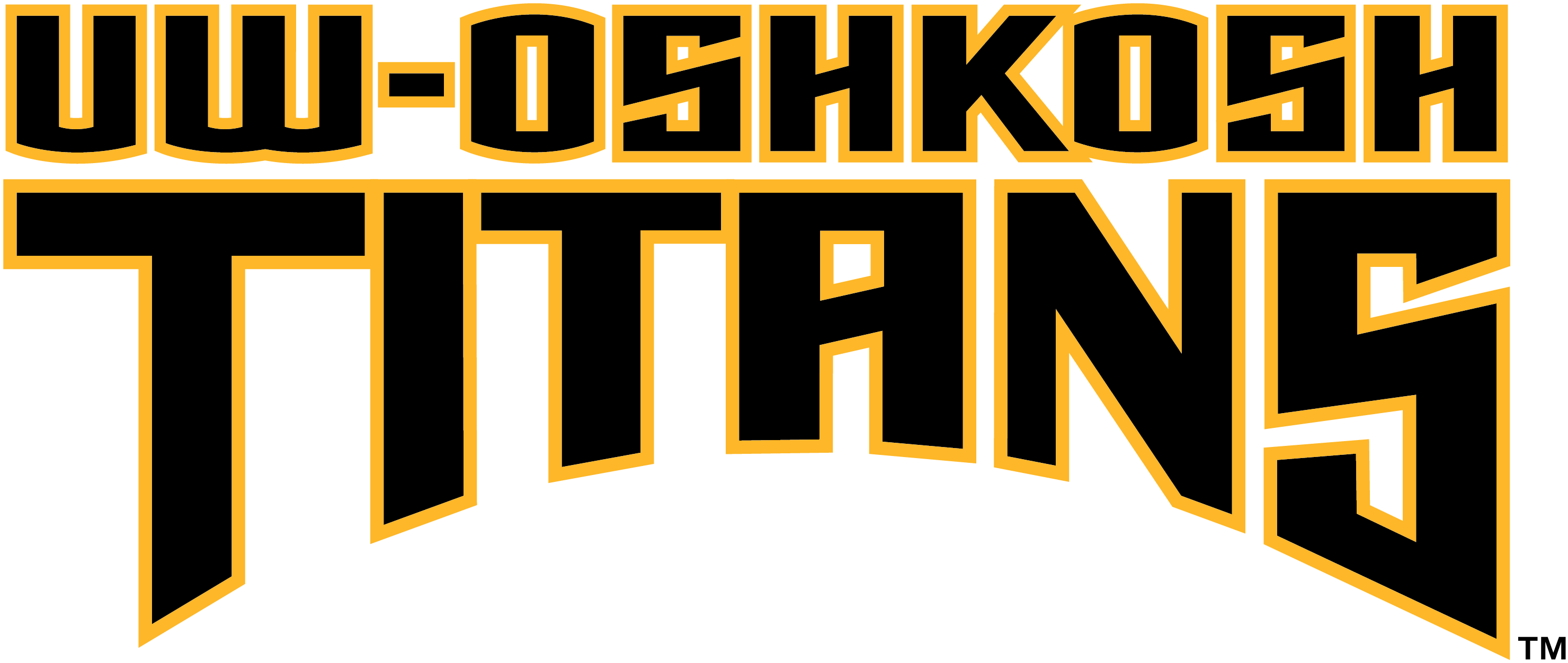
- First season: 1893; 133 years ago
- Head coach: Peter Jennings; 4th season, 23–17 (.575)
- Location: Oshkosh, Wisconsin
- Stadium: Titan Stadium (capacity: 9,800)
- NCAA division: Division III
- Conference: WIAC
- Colors: Black and yellow
- All-time record: 493–522–45 (.486)
- Playoff record: 12–5 (.706)

Conference championships
- WIAC: 11 (1920, 1923, 1928, 1935, 1968, 1972, 1976, 2012, 2015, 2017, 2019)
- Rivalries: Wisconsin–Whitewater Warhawks
- Website: uwoshkoshtitans.com/football

The Wisconsin–Oshkosh Titans football program is the intercollegiate American football team for the University of Wisconsin–Oshkosh located in the U.S. state of Wisconsin. The team competes in the NCAA Division III and are members of the Wisconsin Intercollegiate Athletic Conference (WIAC). Wisconsin–Oshkosh's first football team was fielded in 1893. The team plays its home games at the 9,800 seat Titan Stadium in Oshkosh, Wisconsin. Peter Jennings has served as the head coach for Titans since 2022.

== Head coaching history ==
Wisconsin–Oshkosh has had 23 head coaches in their history. No teams were fielded in 1943 or 1944 due to World War II. Additionally, no team was fielded in 2020 due to the COVID-19 pandemic.

Coach	Seasons	Term	Wins	Losses	Ties	Win %	Conference titles	Playoff appearances
Roy Lewis Morse	4	1893–1896	3	8	0	.273	N/A	N/A
Banno Smith	1	1897	4	2	1	.643	N/A	N/A
John Jones	1	1898	2	4	1	.357	N/A	N/A
William McMaster	1	1899	1	6	1	.188	N/A	N/A
George Senn	1	1900	2	5	1	.313	N/A	N/A
William Blair	1	1901	3	3	0	.500	N/A	N/A
Walter Coolidge	4	1902–1905	21	15	2	.579	N/A	N/A
Vincent Poor	1	1906	3	3	2	.500	N/A	N/A
Walter McMillian	3	1907–1909	10	11	0	.476	N/A	N/A
Raymond Manchester	2	1910–1911	9	4	2	.667	N/A	N/A
Arthur Meyer	6	1912–1917	12	25	1	.329	0	N/A
Frank Karnes	1	1918	4	2	0	.667	0	N/A
Arthur Strum	1	1919	5	1	0	.833	0	N/A
Chester C. Dillon	1	1920	6	1	1	.813	1	N/A
Howard Hancock	9	1921–1928, 1930	38	19	10	.642	2	N/A
Robert Kolf	30	1929, 1931–1942, 1946–1962	59	121	16	.342	1	N/A
William Bulfer	1	1945	1	3	0	.250	0	N/A
Russell Young	14	1963–1976	68	63	2	.519	3	0
Dave Hochtritt	7	1977–1983	31	38	1	.450	0	0
Ron Cardo	16	1984–1999	58	98	4	.375	0	0
Phil Meyer	7	2000–2006	31	38	0	.449	0	0
Pat Cerroni	14	2007–2019, 2021	109	45	0	.708	4	5
Peter Jennings	4	2022–present	23	17	0	.575	0	0

== Championships ==
=== Conference championships ===
The Titans have won the Wisconsin Intercollegiate Athletic Conference (WIAC) championship 11 times.

Year	Coach	Overall record	WIAC record
1920	Chester C. Dillon	6–1–1	4–0–1
1923	Howard Hancock	7–0	5–0
1928†	Howard Hancock	5–1–2	3–0–2
1935†	Robert Kolf	5–0–1	4–0
1968†	Russell Young	8–2	7–1
1972	Russell Young	8–2	8–0
1976†	Russell Young	8–2	6–2
2012	Pat Cerroni	13–1	7–0
2015	Pat Cerroni	11–2	7–0
2017	Pat Cerroni	12–1	7–0
2019†	Pat Cerroni	8–3	6–1

† Co-champions

=== National championship game ===
The Titans played for the national championship in the 2016 Stagg Bowl, losing a close game to Mary Hardin–Baylor by a score of 7–10. The NCAA later required Mary Hardin–Baylor to vacate its title due to an improper benefit to a student–athlete.

Year	Coach	Division	Opponent	Result	Record
2016	Pat Cerroni	NCAA Division III	Mary Hardin–Baylor	L 7–10	13–2

== Postseason appearances ==
=== NCAA Division III ===
The Titans have made five appearances in the NCAA Division III playoffs with an overall record of 12–5, with their most notable being a Stagg Bowl appearance in 2016, where they were defeated by Mary Hardin–Baylor.

Year	Round	Opponent	Score
2012	First round Second round Quarterfinals; Semifinals	St. Scholastica; Bethel (MN); Linfield; St. Thomas (MN)	W, 55–10; W, 37–14; W, 31–24 ^{OT} L, 14–28
2015	First round Second round Quarterfinals	St. Norbert; Wheaton (IL); Wisconsin–Whitewater	W, 48–0; W, 31–17; L, 29–31
2016	First round Second round Quarterfinals; Semifinals; Finals	Washington (MO); Saint John's (MN); St. Thomas (MN); John Carroll; Mary Hardin–Baylor	W, 49–13; W, 31–14; W, 34–31; W, 10–3; L, 7–10
2017	First round Second round Quarterfinals; Semifinals	Lakeland; North Central (IL); Wartburg; Mount Union	W, 63–0; W, 42–21; W, 41–27; L, 40–43
2019	First round	Central (IA)	L, 37–38 ^{OT}

== Ranked teams ==
Starting in 1999, the American Football Coaches Association (AFCA) began publishing rankings for Division III football. The AFCA Division III poll records are not well kept online, so the table will read "Unknown" if rankings weren't able to be found for that particular season. In 2003, D3football.com started publishing its own rankings for Division III football. Since the inception of both polls, Wisconsin–Oshkosh has been ranked at least five times in the AFCA Coaches Poll and seven times in the D3football.com poll to end the season. Additionally, while not being ranked in the Top 25 to end the season, the Titans have received votes (RV) at least six times in the AFCA poll and seven times in the D3football.com poll.

Year	D3	AFCA	Record
2005	RV	RV	7–3
2007	RV	Unknown	7–3
2011	RV	RV	7–3
2012	4	4	13–1
2013	11	15	8–2
2014	20	25	6–4
2015	5	5	11–2
2016	2	Unknown	13–2
2017	3	Unknown	12–1
2018	NR	RV	6–4
2019	22	21	8–3
2021	RV	RV	6–3
2022	RV	NR	6–4
2023	RV	RV	6–4
2024	RV	RV	6–4

== Border Battle ==
From 1984 to 2000 the Hubert H. Humphrey Metrodome, home to the Minnesota Vikings and Minnesota Golden Gophers, hosted games in November between WIAC teams and Northern Sun Intercollegiate Conference (NSIC) teams at the NCAA Division II level in what came to be known as the "Border Battle". The Titans played at the Metrodome two times, and had a 1–1 record.

Date	Opponent	Result
November 14, 1999	Minnesota State–Moorhead	L 7–56
November 10, 2000	Minnesota Morris	W 54–0

== Notable former players ==
Name	Position	Drafted	Pro team	Years active
Milt Wilson	G	— (Note: The NFL draft was not created until 1936.)	Green Bay Packers	1919–1921
Pahl Davis	G, FB	—	Green Bay Packers	1922
Eber Simpson	QB	—	St. Louis All-Stars	1923
Hal Robl	LB	Undrafted, 1945	Chicago Cardinals	1945
Myles Strasser	RB	17th round (452), 1968	New York Jets	Did not play
Clair Rasmussen	OG	14th round (352), 1970	Houston Oilers	Did not play
Ron Cardo	RB	10th round (236), 1971	San Francisco 49ers	Did not play
Marty Below	T	Did not play professionally		
Barry Derickson	LT	Did not play professionally		
Lester Leitl	T	Did not play professionally		
John Thome	QB, HB, DB	Did not play professionally		
