= Winona State Warriors football =

College football team

- First season: 1895; 131 years ago
- Athletic director: Jennifer Flowers
- Head coach: Brian Curtin; 2nd season, 11–11 (.500)
- Field: Maxwell Field at Warrior Stadium
- NCAA division: Division II
- Conference: Northern Sun Intercollegiate Conference
- Colors: Purple and white
- Bowl record: 2–2 (.500)

College Football Playoff appearances
- NCAA Div. II: 7 (2001, 2003, 2004, 2006, 2007, 2017, 2022) NAIA Div. I: 1 (1993)

Conference championships
- NSIC: 18 (1939, 1947, 1956, 1957, 1962, 1964, 1968, 1983, 1993, 1994, 1997, 1998, 2000, 2001, 2003, 2004, 2005, 2007)

Division championships
- NSIC South: 3 (2010, 2012, 2022)
- Rivalries: Minnesota State Mavericks; Southwest Minnesota State Mustangs
- Website: winonastatewarriors.com

The Winona State Warriors football program is the intercollegiate American football team for Winona State University located in Winona, Minnesota. Winona State competes at the NCAA Division II level and is a member of the Northern Sun Intercollegiate Conference (NSIC). The Warriors play their home games at Maxwell Field at Warrior Stadium. The Warriors are currently coached by Brian Curtin.

== Head coaching history ==
Winona State has had at least 24 coaches in the program's history.

Seasons	Years	Coach	Wins	Losses	Ties	Win %
1895	1	Louis H. Galbreath	0	3	0	.000
1896–1899	4	Damon Roberts	8	5	1	.615
1911–1912	2	Unknown	2	4	0	.333
1915–1916	2	Floyd W. Moore	3	8	0	.273
1917, 1919–1920	3	Talmage O. Dillon	8	14	2	.375
1921–1922	2	Edgar W. Everts	3	8	1	.292
1923–1926	4	Ray Habermann	18	7	3	.696
1927–1933, 1935	8	Glen Galligan	30	23	4	.561
1934	1	Earl Greene	2	5	0	.286
1936–1941	6	Harry Jackson	18	20	4	.476
1942	1	Luther McCown	2	4	1	.357
1946–1950, 1952–1954	8	Eugene Brodhagen	18	39	3	.325
1951	1	Lyle Arns	0	6	0	.000
1955–1957	3	Russ Owen	11	13	0	.458
1958–1970	13	Madeo Molinari	49	53	4	.481
1971–1975	5	Bob Keister	18	29	0	.383
1976–1977	2	Frank Conroy	4	16	0	.200
1978–1985	8	Myron Smith	21	62	0	.253
1986	1	John Martin	3	7	1	.318
1987–1989	3	Dave Bassore	7	25	0	.219
1990–1995	6	Tom Hosier	25	38	1	.398
1996–2021	25	Tom Sawyer	197	89	0	.689
2022–2024	3	Brian Bergstrom	18	16	0	.529
2025–present	2	Brian Curtin	11	11	0	.500

== Championships ==
=== Conference championships ===
Winona State has won the Northern Sun Intercollegiate Conference championship 18 times.

Year	Coach	Overall record	NSIC record
1939	Harry Jackson	7–1	4–0
1947†	Eugene Brodhagen	4–3–1	3–1
1956	Russ Owen	4–4	3–1
1957†	Russ Owen	5–3	3–1
1962	Madeo Molinari	6–1–1	5–0
1964	Madeo Molinari	6–1	5–0
1968†	Madeo Molinari	5–4	4–1
1983	Myron Smith	7–4	5–1
1993	Tom Hosier	7–4	5–1
1994	Tom Hosier	7–3–1	5–0–1
1997	Tom Sawyer	9–2	6–0
1998	Tom Sawyer	9–2	6–0
2000	Tom Sawyer	9–3	7–1
2001	Tom Sawyer	10–2	9–0
2003†	Tom Sawyer	11–2	7–1
2004	Tom Sawyer	10–2	7–0
2005†	Tom Sawyer	8–3	6–1
2007	Tom Sawyer	10–2	9–0

† Co-champions

=== Division championships ===
Winona State has won three NSIC South division championships.

Year	Coach	Overall record	NSIC record	Division record
2010†	Tom Sawyer	7–4	6–4	5–1
2012	Tom Sawyer	10–2	9–2	6–1
2022†	Brian Bergstrom	8–4	8–3	5–1

† Co-champions

== Postseason ==
=== Bowl games ===
Winona State has played in the Mineral Water Bowl four times, winning two and losing two.

Year	Bowl	Coach	Opponent	Result	Record
2000	Mineral Water Bowl	Tom Sawyer	Missouri Western	W 43–41 ^{3OT}	9–3
2002	Mineral Water Bowl	Tom Sawyer	Emporia State	L 27–34 ^{OT}	8–4
2012	Mineral Water Bowl	Tom Sawyer	Lindenwood	W 41–21	10–2
2019	Mineral Water Bowl	Tom Sawyer	Nebraska–Kearney	L 33–50	8–4

=== NCAA Division II playoffs ===
The Warriors have competed in the NCAA Division II playoffs seven times, with their only win coming in 2003 before losing in the quarterfinals.

Year	Round	Opponent	Result	Record
2001	First round	North Dakota	L 28–42	10–2
2003	First round	Emporia State	W 10–3	11–2
2003	Quarterfinals	North Dakota	L 29–36	11–2
2004	First round	Grand Valley State	L 13–16	10–2
2006	First round	North Dakota	L 0–42	9–3
2007	First round	North Dakota	L 2–44	10–2
2017	First round	Texas A&M–Commerce	L 6–20	10–2
2022	First Round	Bemidji State	L 7–31	8–4

=== NAIA Division I playoffs ===
Winona State participated in the NAIA Division I playoffs one time in 1993, losing in the quarterfinals.

Year	Round	Opponent	Result	Record
1993	Quarterfinals	Central State (OH)	L 7–58	7–4

== Notable former players ==
- Jim Althoff
- David Braun
- Frank Conroy
- Brian Curtin
- Tom Sawyer
- Jerry Seeman
- Brian Wrobel
