= List of Croatian women writers =

This is a list of women writers who were born in Croatia or whose writings are closely associated with that country.

== A ==
- Ivana Brlić-Mažuranić (1874–1938), children's writer

== B ==
- Morea Banićević (born 1981), writer for children and young adults
- Jelica Belović-Bernardzikowska (1870–1946), feminist, pedagogic writer, ethnographer
- Ivanka Brađašević (born 1955), poet
- Lukrecija Bogašinović Budmani (1710–1784), early poet
- Anica Bošković (1714–1804), early poet and song writer

== C ==
- Aloïse de Carlowitz (1797 – 1863) was a translator and author who was born in Rijeka
- Nives Celsius (born 1981), columnist

== D ==
- Slavenka Drakulić (born 1949), novelist, essayist, and non-fiction writer
- Daša Drndić (1946–2018), novelist
- Malkica Dugeč (1936–2026), poet

== G ==
- Stanka Gjurić (born 1966), poet and lyric essayist

== I ==
- Rada Iveković (born 1945), non-fiction writers
- Nada Iveljić (1931–2009), children's writer

== J ==
- Marija Jambrišak (1847–1937), educator, writer, magazine editor
- Dragojla Jarnević (1813–1875), poet
- Marija Jurić Zagorka (1873–1957), journalist, novelist and dramatist

== K ==
- Lada Kaštelan (born 1961), dramatist, screenwriter
- Nada Klaić (1920–1988), historian
- Zlata Kolarić-Kišur (1894–1990), novelist, autobiographer
- Sida Košutić, writer, poet and journalist (1902–1965)
- Vesna Krmpotić (1932–2018), novelist

== M ==
- Julijana Matanović (born 1959), short story writer and novelist
- Mara Matočec (1885–1967), folk writer, poet and playwright

== R ==
- Smiljana Rendić (1926-1994), journalist, translator and poet
- Nasta Rojc (1883–1964), autobiographer, letter writer, painter

== Š ==
- Danica Širola (1900-1926), poet and school teacher
- Sunčana Škrinjarić (1931–2004), writer, poet and journalist
- Marina Šur Puhlovski, short story and travel writer, novelist and essayist

== T ==
- Sonja Tomić (born 1947), children's writer and illustrator
- Jagoda Truhelka (1864–1957), novelist and pedagogist

== U ==
- Dubravka Ugrešić (1949–2023), novelist

== Z ==
- Katarina Zrinska (c. 1625–1673), noblewoman, poet
- Cvijeta Zuzorić (1552–1648), lyric poet

== See also ==
- List of women writers
- List of Croatian writers
- Croatian literature
