= Ivo Lendić =

Croatian poet, journalist, essayist and dissident (1908–1982)

- Born: June 4, 1908; Janjina (Pelješac), Kingdom of Dalmatia
- Died: April 1, 1982 (aged 73); Puerto Iguazú, Argentina
- Education: Faculty of Philosophy, Zagreb
- Occupations: poet, journalist
- Writing career
- Pen name: Jan Jinar
- Language: Croatian, Spanish
- Years active: 1930−1982
- Genre: poetry
- Notable works: Lirika (1930); Angelusi (1936)
- Movement: Croatian Catholic Movement

Ivo Lendić (4 June 1908 – 1 April 1982) was a Croatian poet and journalist, influental Catholic writer and polemicist, member of Croatian Catholic Movement and Croatian diaspora in Argentina. His literary work and personal life were marked by illness and exile, and he published his only two poetry collections in his youth: Lirika ("Lyrics", 1930) and Angelusi ("Angeluses", 1936). Nevertheless, he left a noticeable mark on Croatian poetry, and his poems have been featured in several anthologies and reviews of Croatian literature.

== Bibliography ==
Published works:

- Lendić, Ivo (1930). Lirika [Lyrics] (in Croatian). Zagreb.
- Jinar, Jan (1935). U Meksiku [In Mexico] (in Croatian). Zagreb.
- Lendić, Ivo (1936). Angelusi [Angeluses] (in Croatian). Zagreb.
- Lendić, Ivo (1938). Psihoanaliza [Psychoanalysis] (in Croatian). Zagreb.
- Lendić, Ivo; Bogdan, Ivo (1964). "Las relaciones entre Yugoslavia y Santa Sede" [Relations between Yugoslavia and the Holy See]. Studia Croatica (in Spanish).

Posthumously published:

- Lendić, Ivo (2001). Božji kotači [God's wheels]. Split.
- Lendić, Ivo (2000). Angelusi [Angeluses] (in Croatian). Zagreb: Kršćanska sadašnjost. ISBN 953-151-348-1. (collected literary works)

His works are included in the following anthologies:

- Dušan Žanko, ed. (1935). Hrvatska marijanska lirika [Croatian Marian lyrics] (in Croatian). Zagreb.
- Vinko Nikolić, ed. (1957). Pod tuđim nebom [Under a foreign sky] (in Croatian). Buenos Aires.

== Literature ==
- Armanda, Ivo (2013). "LENDIĆ, Ivo". Croatian Biographical Lexicon (HBL) (in Croatian). Miroslav Krleža Lexicographic Institute.
- "Lendić, Ivo". Croatian Encyclopedia (in Croatian). Miroslav Krleža Lexicographic Institute. 2013–2026.
- Lončarević, Vladimir (2008). Ivo Lendić, Katolicizam i kultura. Eseji, članci i polemike [Ivo Lendić, Catholicism and Culture. Essays, Articles and Controversies]. Zagreb: Glas Koncila. ISBN 978-953-241-148-5.
- Šel., M. (1993–1999). "LENDIĆ, Ivo". Krležijana (in Croatian). Miroslav Krleža Lexicographic Institute.
