= Miss Universe Croatia 2019 =

Beauty and fashion pageant

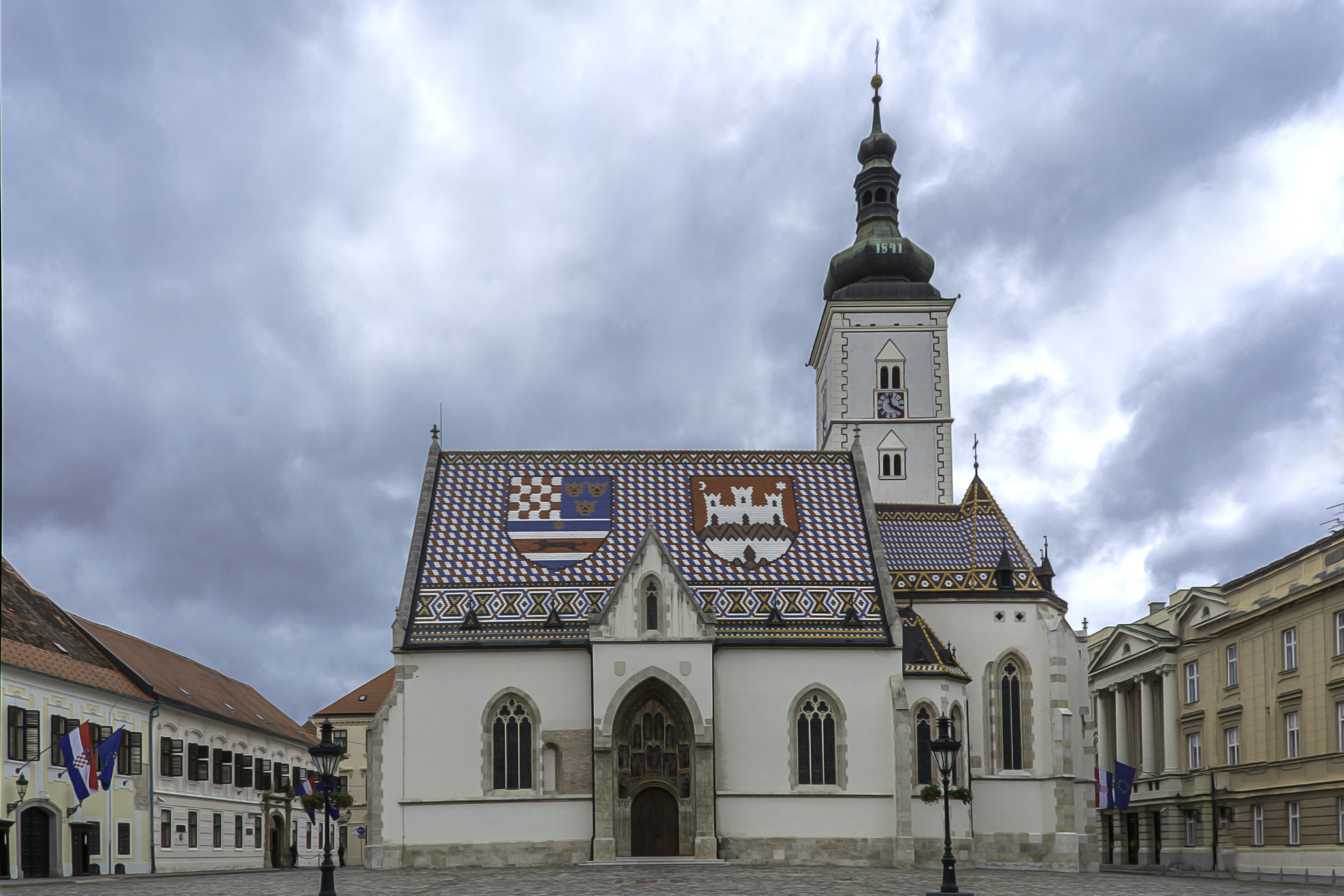
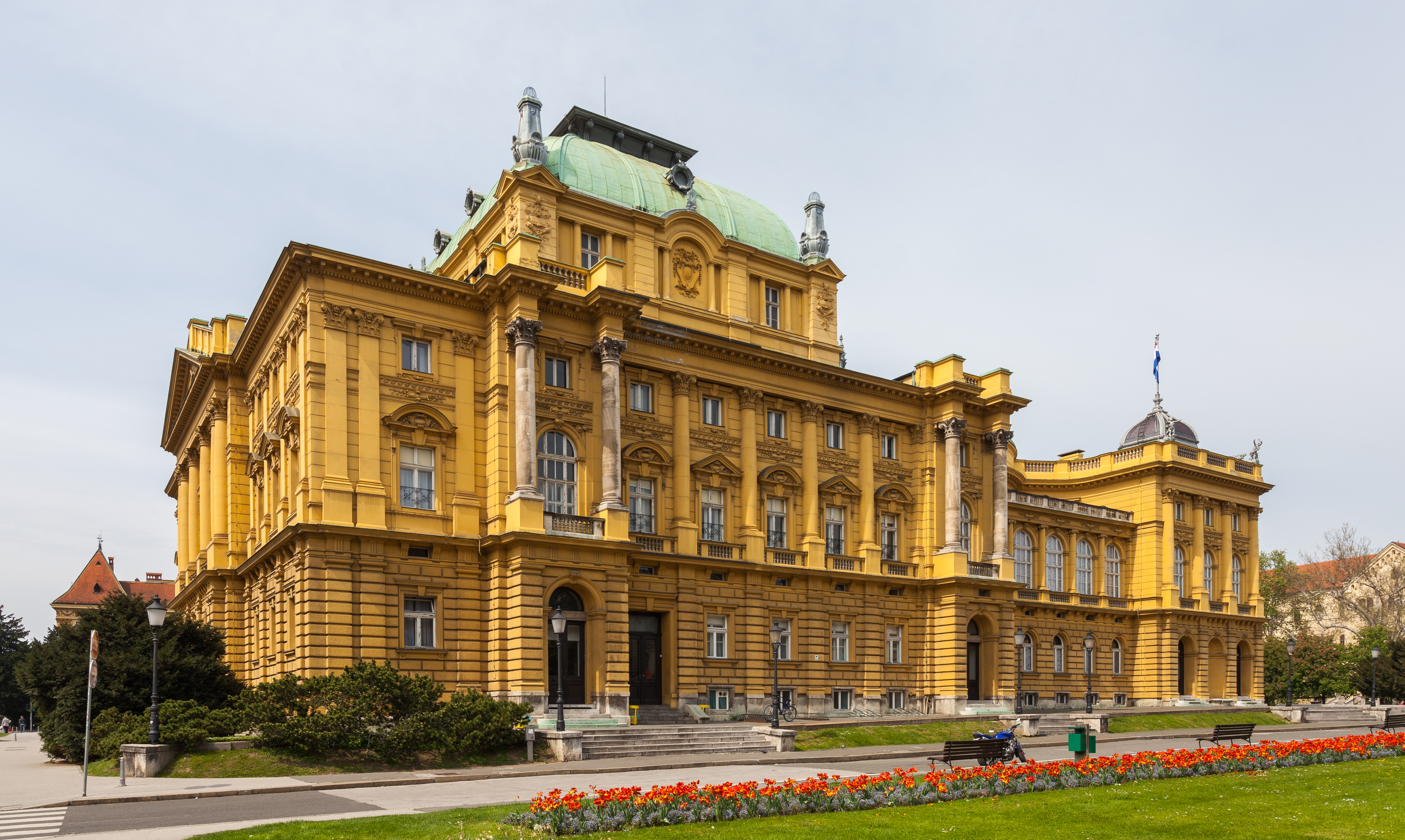
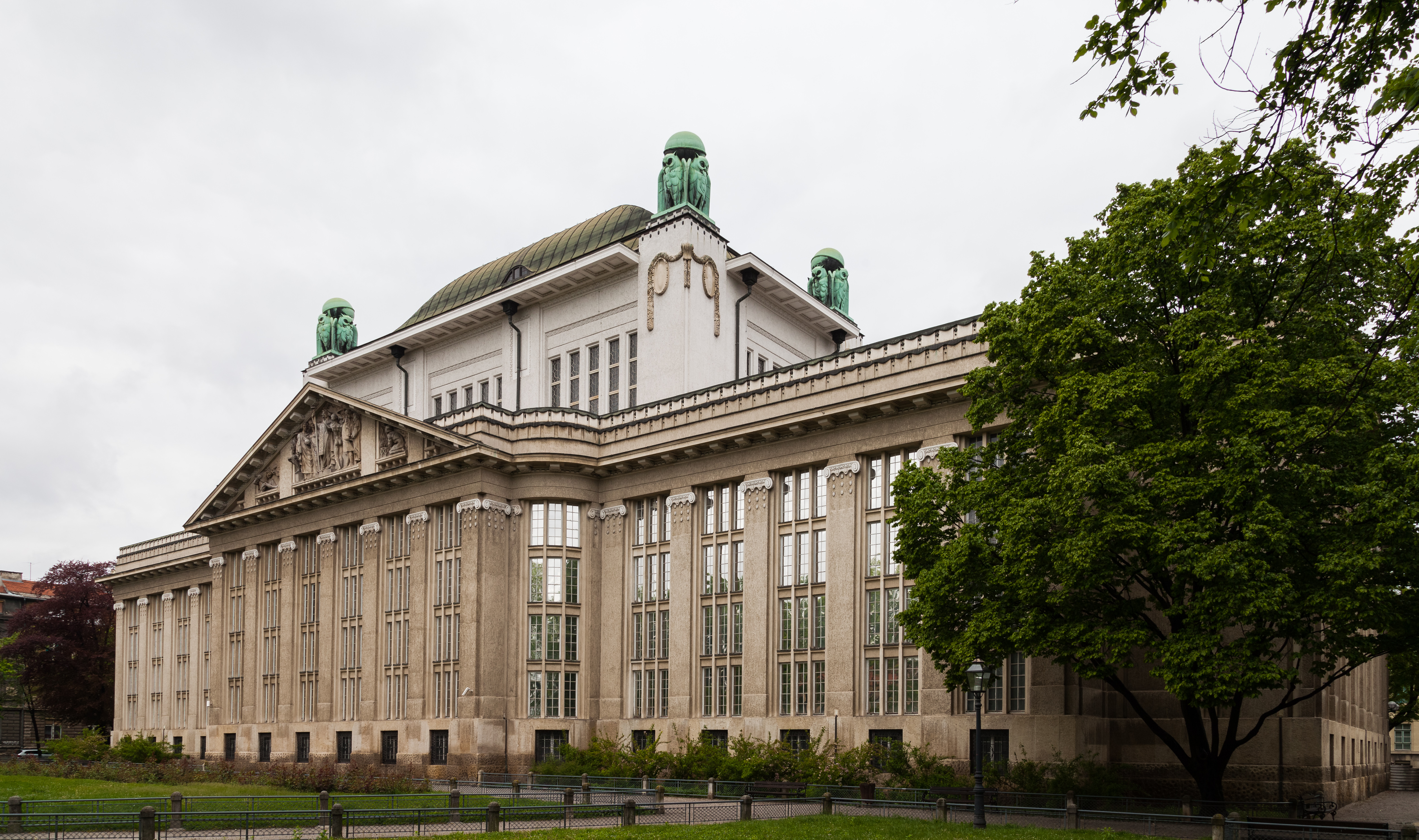
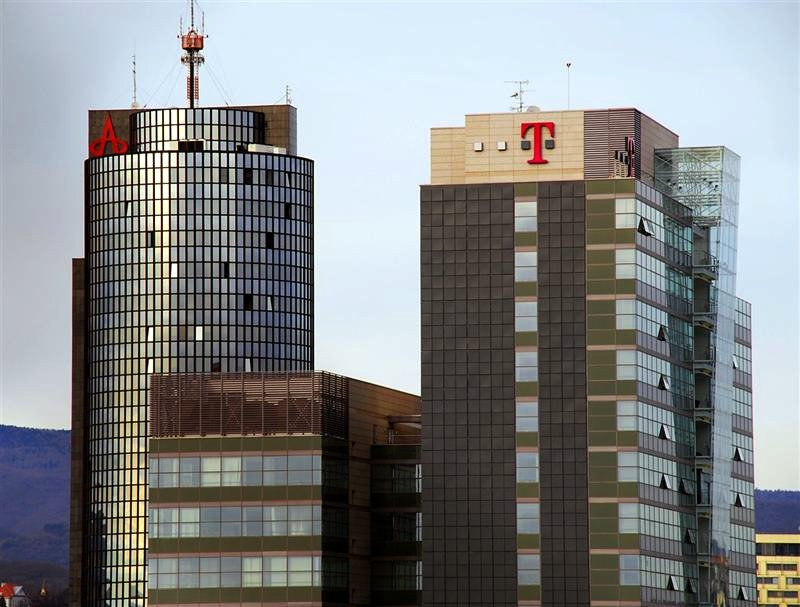
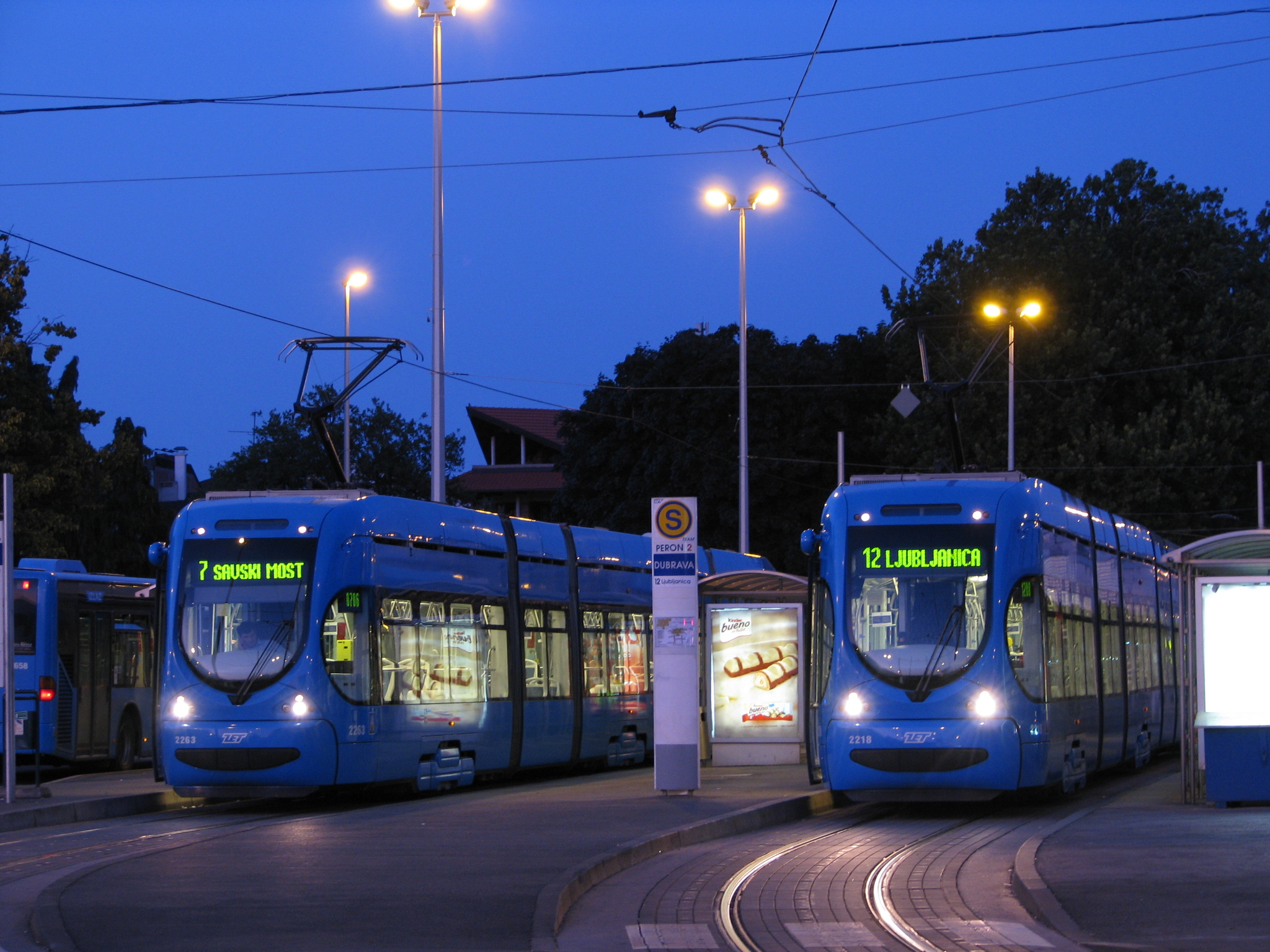
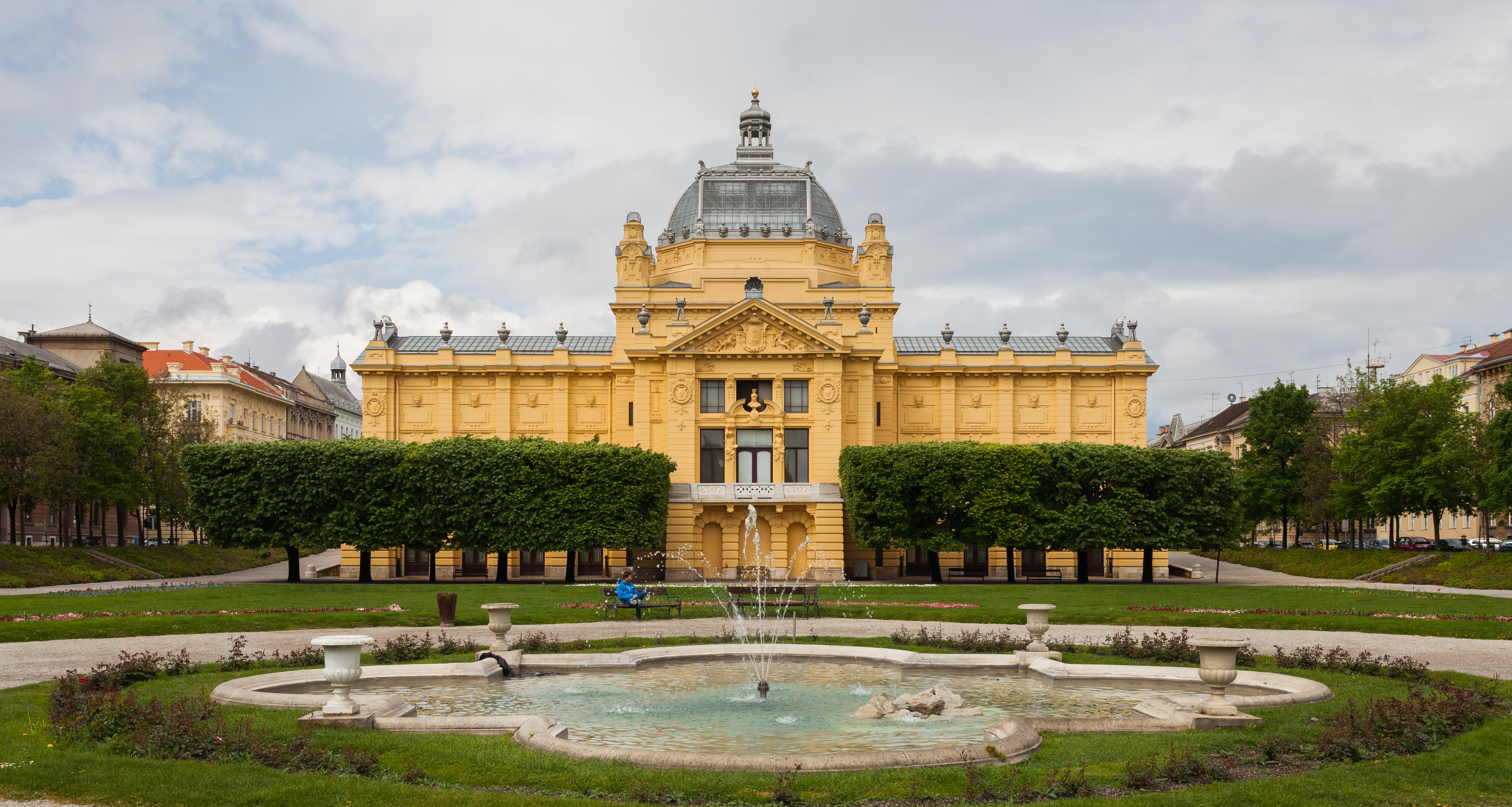
- Zagreb, the host city of the pageant
- Date: April 27, 2019
- Entertainment: Jacques Houdek; Roko Blažević; Goran Karan
- Venue: Zagreb, Croatia
- Broadcaster: Croatian television
- Entrants: 18
- Placements: 10
- Winner: Mia Rkman

Miss Universe Croatia 2019 was the 20th edition of Miss Universe Croatia pageant held on April 27, 2019, in Zagreb. 18 contestants around Croatia competed for the prestigious crown. Mia Pojatina of Nova Gradiška crowned Mia Rkman of Korčula at the end of the event.

Mia Rkman represented Croatia at Miss Universe 2019 pageant and placed in the Top 20.

== Delegates ==
18 contestants competed for the title.

Delegate	Age	Hometown	Placement
Dora Viajić	22	Žrnovnica	
Marijana Slišković	19	Sinj	
Tea Slavica	19	Zagreb	1st Runner Up
Petra Krivić	18	Zagreb	Miss Photogenic
Karla Karamatić	18	Zagreb	
Rebeka Raić	18	Zagreb	
Nives Jekić	22	Zagreb	
Nika Glasnović	21	Zagreb	
Ana Marjolović	22	Zagreb	
Barbara Jakovljević	19	Zagreb	
Mia Rkman	21	Korčula	Miss Universe Croatia 2019
Ivana Radić	23	Knin	
Tea Peranić	25	Rijeka	
Ivana Matić	19	Bjelovar	
Eva Kijajić	19	Poreč	
Nicole Ivković	20	Vukovar	
Maja Čatlak	19	Makarska	2nd Runner Up
Karla Bartolin	23	Zabok	
