= Obad =

Obad may refer to:

- Obad, Romania, a village administered by the town of Ciacova, Timiș County, Romania
- Obad (surname), a South Slavic surname
