= Kirchmayer =

Kirchmayer is a surname. Notable people with the surname include:

- Eva Kirchmayer-Bilić (born 1971), Croatian musician and writer
- Jerzy Kirchmayer (1895–1959), Polish historian and military officer
- Johannes Kirchmayer (1860–1930), American woodcarver
- Kálmán Kirchmayer (1897–1990), Hungarian tennis player
- Wanda Kirchmayer (1901–1944), Polish engineer and soldier

== See also ==
- Kirchmeyer
