= Kirchmeyer =

Kirchmeyer is a surname. Notable people with the surname include:

- Helmut Kirchmeyer (born 1930), German musicologist and historian
- Ray Kirchmeyer (fl. 1923–1946), American football player and coach

== See also ==
- Kirchmayer
