= Stjepan Lice =

Croatian jurist, poet, essayist and columnist

- Born: 1954 (age 71–72); Zagreb, Croatia
- Education: Faculty of Law, University of Zagreb
- Occupations: Jurist, writer
- Spouse: Ružica Lice
- Children: 3
- Writing career
- Language: Croatian
- Period: Short story, prose poem, meditative prose

Stjepan Lice is a Croatian jurist, poet, essayist and columnist for Kolo, Glas Koncila, Kana and other Croatian periodicals. Lice is one of the most popular contemporary Croatian Christian writers.

He collaborates with writers (Sonja Tomić, Ivanka Brađašević), historians (Vladimir Lončarević) and other influential Catholic intellectuals. Lice works as a secretary of the Faculty of Law, University of Zagreb. Lice is author of several scientific papers. He is a member of Secular Franciscan Order and collaborator for Croatian Catholic Radio and Radio Maria, as well as for Croatian Catholic Network and member of a Committee of the Croatian Radiotelevision.

== Works ==
(incomplete)

- Kako su rasli zemlja i nebo, Diocese of Đakovo, 1990
- Govor tišine, Durieux, 1992
- Dobra sreća, Kršćanska sadašnjost, 1993
- Govor tišine: ime nade, 1993
- Božić u orahovoj ljusci, Teovizija, 1994
- Djeca Betanija, Teovizija, 1995
- Ljudskost Božića: Božicńi razgovori s Bonaventurom Dudom, 1995 (co-author)
- Krist i naši svagdani: razgovori s Bonaventurom Dudom, 1996 (co-author)
- Otkriće blizine, Kršćanska sadašnjost, 1996
- Pohvala vedrini, Teovizija, 1996
- Znakovi prisutnosti: mala knjiga simbola, 1997
- Na putu bez odlaska, Kršćanska sadašnjost, 1998
- Litanije mojih svetih, Teovizija, 1999
- Nevidljive priče, 2000
- S dobrim vjetrom, 2003
- Tragovi dobrote, 2005
- Neka te sreća prati, Kršćanska sadašnjost, 2006
- Ozbiljnost nade, 2010
- Prostranije ogledalo, 2011
- Bubekovo gnijezdo, 2012
- Fra Zvjezdan: trag zahvalnosti, Teovizija, 2016
- Božićna blaženstva: zapisi i priče, Kršćanska sadašnjost, 2018

=== Translated works ===
- Dárek pro Ježíška (in Czech)
