= Obad (surname) =

Obad is a surname. Notable people with the surname include:

- Adis Obad (born 1971), Bosnian footballer
- Lana Obad (born 1988), Croatian beauty pageant contestant
- Stanko Obad (1911—1979), Yugoslav engineer
