= Drače, Croatia =

Drače
- Village
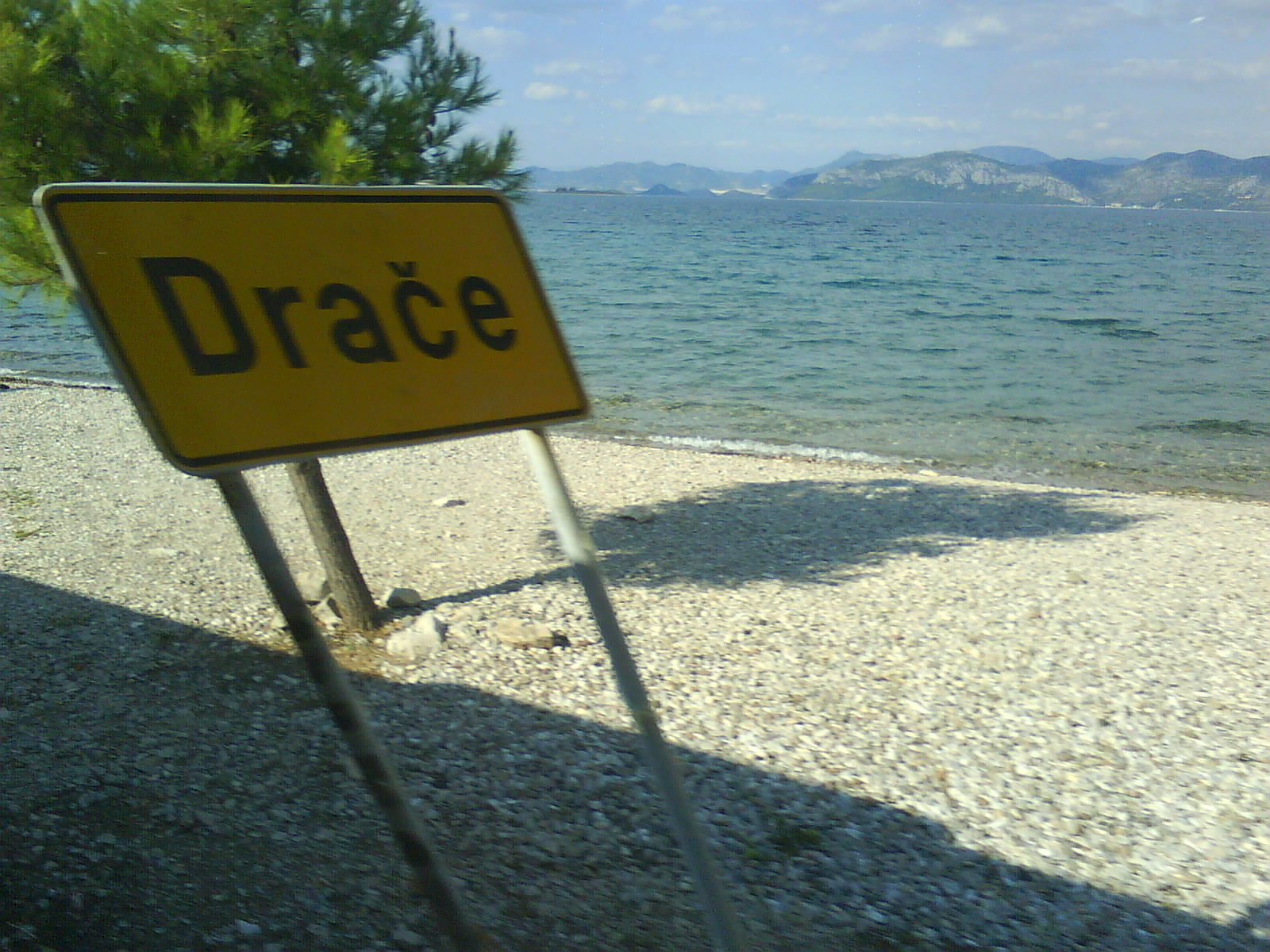

- Location within Croatia
- Coordinates: 42.9200636°N 17.4352536°E
- Country: Croatia
- County: Dubrovnik-Neretva County
- Municipality: Janjina

Area
  - Total: 0.69 sq mi (1.8 km^{2})

Population (2021)
  - Total: 116
  - Density: 170/sq mi (64/km^{2})
- Time zone: UTC+1 (CET)
  - Summer (DST): UTC+2 (CEST)

Drače is a village in Croatia, located on the Pelješac peninsula.

== Demographics ==
According to the 2021 census, its population was 116.
