= Melita Fabečić =

Croatian model (born 1994)

- Born: 1994 (age 31–32)
- Height: 1.73 m (5 ft 8 in)
- Beauty pageant titleholder
- Title: Miss Universe Hrvatske 2013 Hailed for most beautiful and sexiest Croat in 2012 by Globus magazine
- Hair color: Brown
- Eye color: Brown
- Major competitions: Miss Universe Hrvatske 2013 (Winner); Miss Universe 2013

Melita Fabečić (born c. December 1994) is a Croatian beauty pageant titleholder who was crowned Miss Universe Croatia 2013. She represented her country in the 2013 Miss Universe, where she failed to place in the semi-final.

== Miss Universe Hrvatske 2013 ==
Melita Fabečić, from Zagreb, was crowned Miss Universe Hrvatske 2013 among 20 contestants during the annual beauty competition which took place on May 10. Her measurements are 32-23-36.

Awards and achievements
Preceded by Elizabeta Burg	Miss Universe Croatia; 2013	Succeeded by Ivana Mišura
