= Elizabeta Burg =

Miss Universe Croatia 2012

- Born: Elizabeta Burg; 1 October 1993 (age 33); Vrbanja, Croatia
- Height: 1.78 m (5 ft 10 in)
- Beauty pageant titleholder
- Title: Miss Universe Hrvatske 2012
- Hair color: Brown
- Eye color: Green
- Major competitions: Miss Hrvatske 2011; (Unplaced); Miss Universe Hrvatske 2012; (Winner); Miss Universe 2012; (Top 16)

Elizabeta Burg (born 1 October 1993) is a Croatian model and beauty pageant titleholder who was crowned Miss Universe Croatia 2012 and represented her country in Miss Universe 2012.

== Early life ==
Burg is Senior School of Public Health Dr. of Medical and Veterinary School in FC.

== Miss Hrvatske 2011 ==
Elizabeta Burg competed for the title of Miss Hrvatske for Miss World in 2011 but failed to place in the top three.

== Miss Universe Hrvatske 2012 ==
Elizabeta Burg has been crowned Miss Universe Hrvatske 2012 at the grand finale of Miss Universe Hrvatske 2012, at the Crystal Ballroom of the Westin Hotel in Zagreb on 1 April 2012. She represented Croatia in Miss Universe 2012 which was held in Las Vegas on 19 December and placed in the top 16.

Awards and achievements
Preceded by Natalija Prica	Miss Universe Croatia; 2012	Succeeded by Melita Fabečić
