= Barbara Filipović =

Croatian model

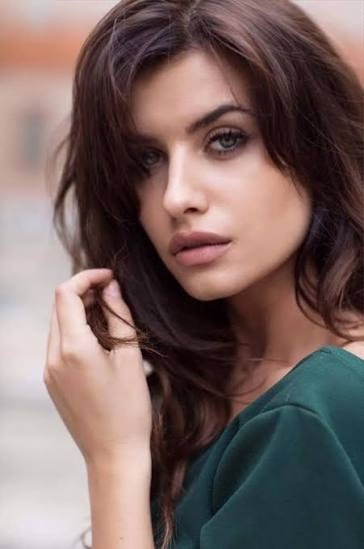
- Born: Barbara Filipović; May 31, 1997 (age 29); Zagreb, Croatia
- Height: 1.76 m (5 ft 9 1/2 in)
- Beauty pageant titleholder
- Title: Miss Universe Croatia 2016
- Hair color: Brown
- Eye color: Green
- Major competitions: Miss Universe Croatia 2016 (Winner); Miss Universe 2016 (Unplaced)

Barbara Filipović (born May 31, 1997) is a Croatian model and beauty pageant titleholder who was crowned Miss Universe Croatia 2016.

She represented Croatia at the Miss Universe 2016 pageant but Unplaced.

== Early life ==
Filipović was born in Zagreb. She graduated from V. Gimnazija in Zagreb.

== Pageantry ==
=== Miss Universe Croatia 2016 ===
Filipović was crowned as Miss Universe Croatia 2016 on April 15, 2016, at the Crystal Ballroom, Hotel Westin in Zagreb. Paula Čaić was adjudged as first runner-up and Marija Kljajić the second runner-up.

=== Miss Universe 2016 ===
Filipović competed at Miss Universe 2016 pageant in Manila, Philippines but Unplaced.

Awards and achievements
Preceded by Barbara Ljiljak	Miss Universe Croatia; 2016	Succeeded by Shanaelle Petty
