= Shanaelle Petty =

Croatian-American model (born 1998)

- Born: 28 February 1998 (age 28); Bad Kreuznach, Germany
- Height: 1.85 m (6 ft 1 in)
- Beauty pageant titleholder
- Title: Miss Universe Croatia 2017
- Hair color: Brown
- Eye color: Brown
- Major competitions: Miss Universe Croatia 2017 (Winner); Miss Universe 2017 (Top 16)

Shanaelle Petty (born 28 February 1998) is a Croatian-American model and beauty pageant titleholder who was crowned Miss Universe Croatia 2017 and represented Croatia at Miss Universe 2017 pageant where she made the top 16.

== Early life ==
Petty was born in Bad Kreuznach, Germany to an African American father and a Croatian mother. She graduated from Terry Sanford High School in Fayetteville, North Carolina, and speaks fluent English, Spanish, and Croatian. She aspires to work for NASA, and attends the Massachusetts Institute of Technology.

== Pageantry ==
=== Miss Universe Croatia 2017 ===
On 28 April 2017, Petty was crowned Miss Universe Croatia 2017. More than 300 girls applied to compete, and 18 finalists were chosen. Petty ended up being crowned the winner by outgoing titleholder Barbara Filipović.

=== Miss Universe 2017 ===
Petty represented Croatia at Miss Universe 2017 and she became the third woman from Croatia to reach the Top 16.

Awards and achievements
Preceded by Barbara Filipović	Miss Universe Croatia; 2017	Succeeded by Mia Pojatina
