= Osobjava =

- Village
- Location within Croatia
- Coordinates: 42.9573519°N 17.3730341°E
- Country: Croatia
- County: Dubrovnik-Neretva County
- Municipality: Janjina

Area
  - Total: 2.7 sq mi (7.1 km^{2})

Population (2021)
  - Total: 61
  - Density: 22/sq mi (8.6/km^{2})
- Time zone: UTC+1 (CET)
  - Summer (DST): UTC+2 (CEST)

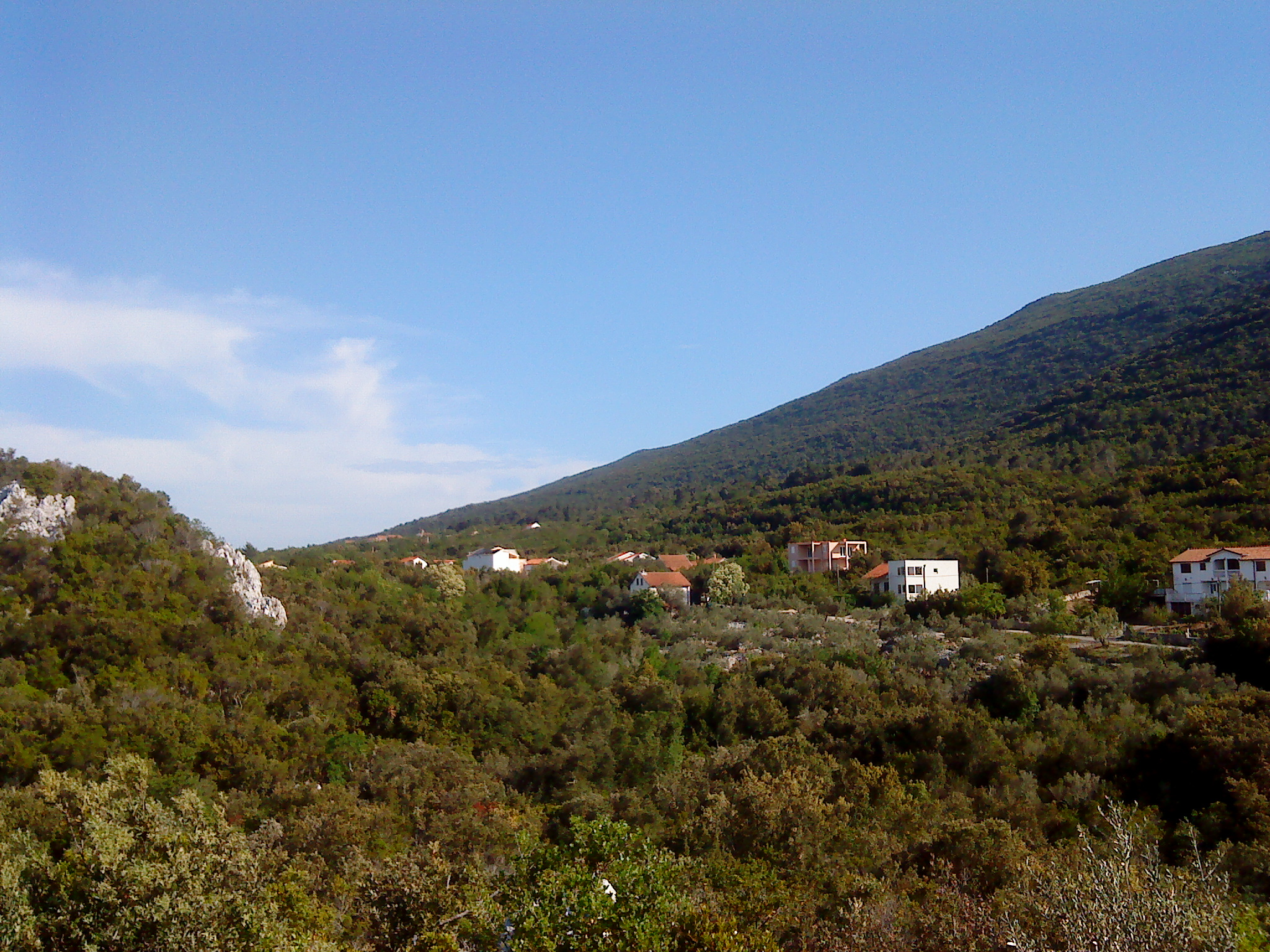
Osobjava

Osobjava is a village in Croatia, located on the Pelješac peninsula.

== Demographics ==
According to the 2021 census, its population was 61.
