= Nova Gradiška =

Town in Croatia

- Town
- Grad Nova Gradiška; Town of Nova Gradiška
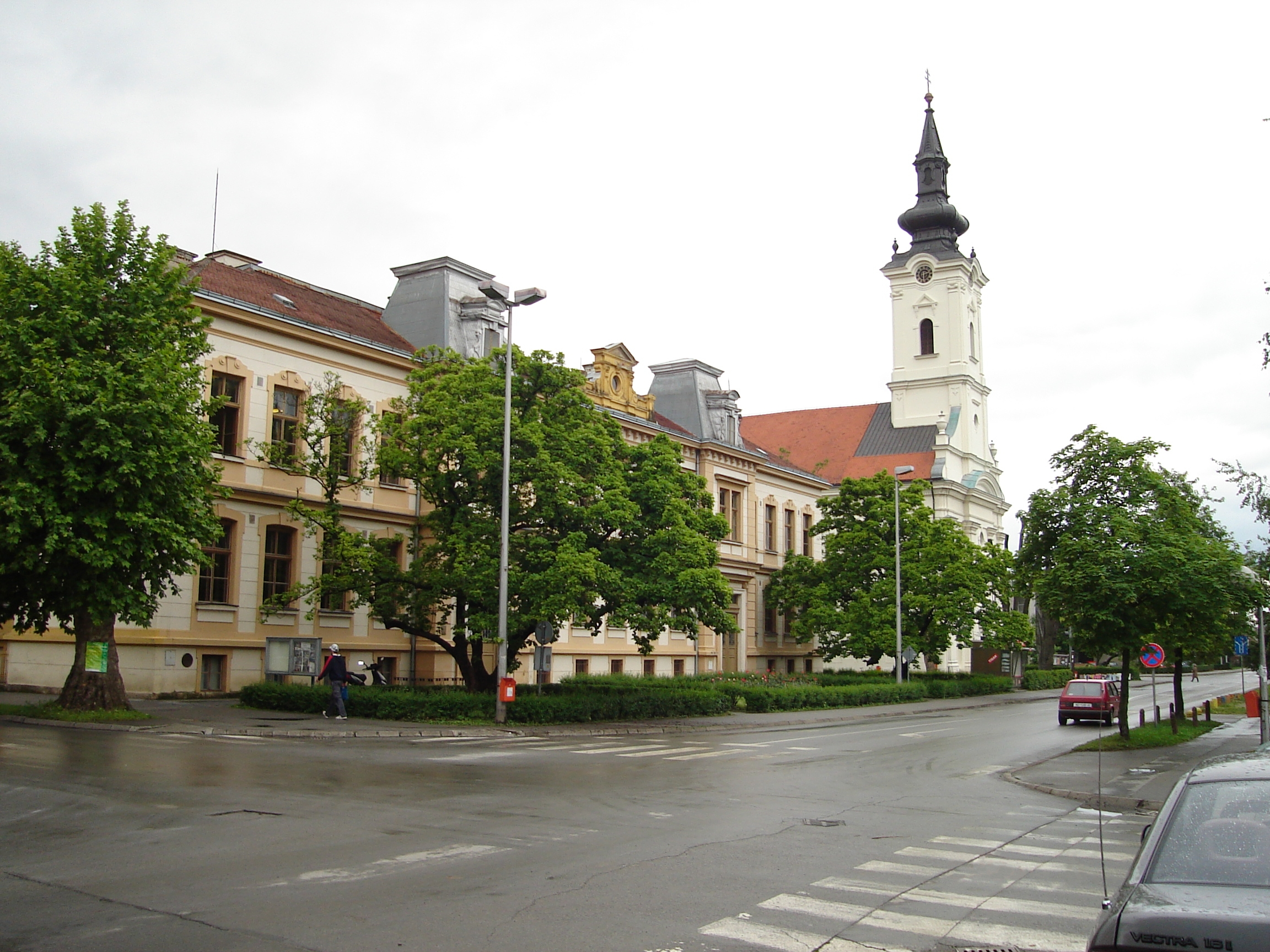
- Nova Gradiška town center
- Interactive map of Nova Gradiška
- Location within Croatia
- Coordinates: 45°15′N 17°23′E
- Country: Croatia
- Region: Slavonia (Posavina)
- County: Brod-Posavina County

Government
  - Mayor: Sabina Vlaović (Ind.)

Area
  - Town: 48.9 km^{2} (18.9 sq mi)
  - Urban: 15.3 km^{2} (5.9 sq mi)

Population (2021)
  - Town: 11,690
  - Density: 239/km^{2} (619/sq mi)
  - Urban: 9,820
  - Urban density: 642/km^{2} (1,660/sq mi)
- Time zone: UTC+1 (CET)
  - Summer (DST): UTC+2 (CEST)
- Website: novagradiska.hr

Nova Gradiška is a town located in the Brod-Posavina County of Croatia, population 14,229 (2011). It is located in the historic region of Slavonia, near the border to Bosnia and Herzegovina.

The first word in the name means New, and there's also an Old Gradiška nearby, the village of Stara Gradiška and the Bosnian town of Gradiška.

== History ==
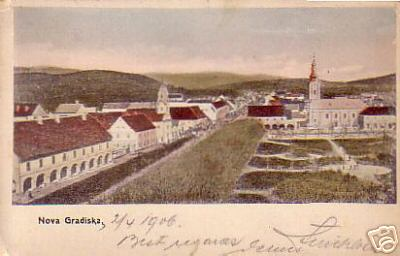
Nova Gradiška in 1906

Nova Gradiška is often referred to as The Youngest Town.

The town of Nova Gradiška was founded in 1748 as an outpost in the Military Frontier and was first named Friedrichsdorf in German. Already in 1750 it was renamed Neu-Gradischka which later became Nova Gradiška in Croatian. The Hungarian name is Újgradiska.

Before 1881, Nova Gradiška (named NEU-GRADISKA before 1850) was part of the Austrian monarchy (Kingdom of Croatia-Slavonia after the compromise of 1867), in the Slavonian Military Frontier, Gradiskaner Regiment N°VIII.

The first building constructed was the church of Saint Tereza, which is an important monument of baroque architecture in Slavonia. The old core of the town comprises the church of Saint Terezija and the old court house and prison from the 18th century.

Between 1881 and 1918, Nova Gradiška was a district capital in the Požega County of the Kingdom.

On 5 July 2021, a brief tornado hit Nova Gradiška.

== Climate ==
Since records began in 1981, the highest temperature recorded at the local weather station was 41.8 °C (107.2 °F), on 28 August 2012. The coldest temperature was −24.8 °C (−12.6 °F), on 13 January 2003.

== Communications ==
The town is located on the M104 railway line, frequently served by passenger trains at the local Nova Gradiška railway station. The A3 motorway also passes nearby. The highway and railway are part of the Pan European corridor X. Bus traffic within the town as well as suburban traffic is very well developed. There is also a connection to Požega via the D51 road and the nearby border crossing to Bosnia and Herzegovina, located in Stara Gradiška.

== Settlements ==
The administrative area of Nova Gradiška includes the following settlements:

- Kovačevac, population 669
- Ljupina, population 987
- Nova Gradiška, population 11,821
- Prvča, population 752
Town of Nova Gradiška: Population trends 1857–2021
v

population	3039	3756	4265	4611	5369	6390	6246	7110	8808	10181	12081	14581	16351	17071	15833	14229	11690
	1857	1869	1880	1890	1900	1910	1921	1931	1948	1953	1961	1971	1981	1991	2001	2011	2021

Sources: Croatian Bureau of Statistics publications

== Politics ==
=== Minority councils ===
Directly elected minority councils and representatives are tasked with consulting tasks for the local or regional authorities in which they are advocating for minority rights and interests, integration into public life and participation in the management of local affairs. At the 2023 Croatian national minorities councils and representatives elections Serbs of Croatia fulfilled legal requirements to elect 15 members minority councils of the Town of Nova Gradiška.

== Tourism ==
Here are several hotels and other tourist resorts present. The Tourist board is also present and well developed in Nova Gradiška. There are a number of townfaires. Some of the most important ones are:

- Carnival festivities "Pokladne svečanosti"
- Flower show "Izložba cvijeća"
- The Folklore Show ("međužupanijska smotra folklora")
- The display of traditional wind instruments ("smotra tradicijskih puhačkih instrumenata")
- Nova Gradiška Music Summer ("Novogradiško glazbeno Ljeto")
- Oldtimer car meeting ("susreti oldtimera")
- Fishfaire ("fišijada")
- Mushroom festival ("izložba gljiva")
- Motorcycle riders meeting "Strmac" ("Motoristički susreti Strmac")

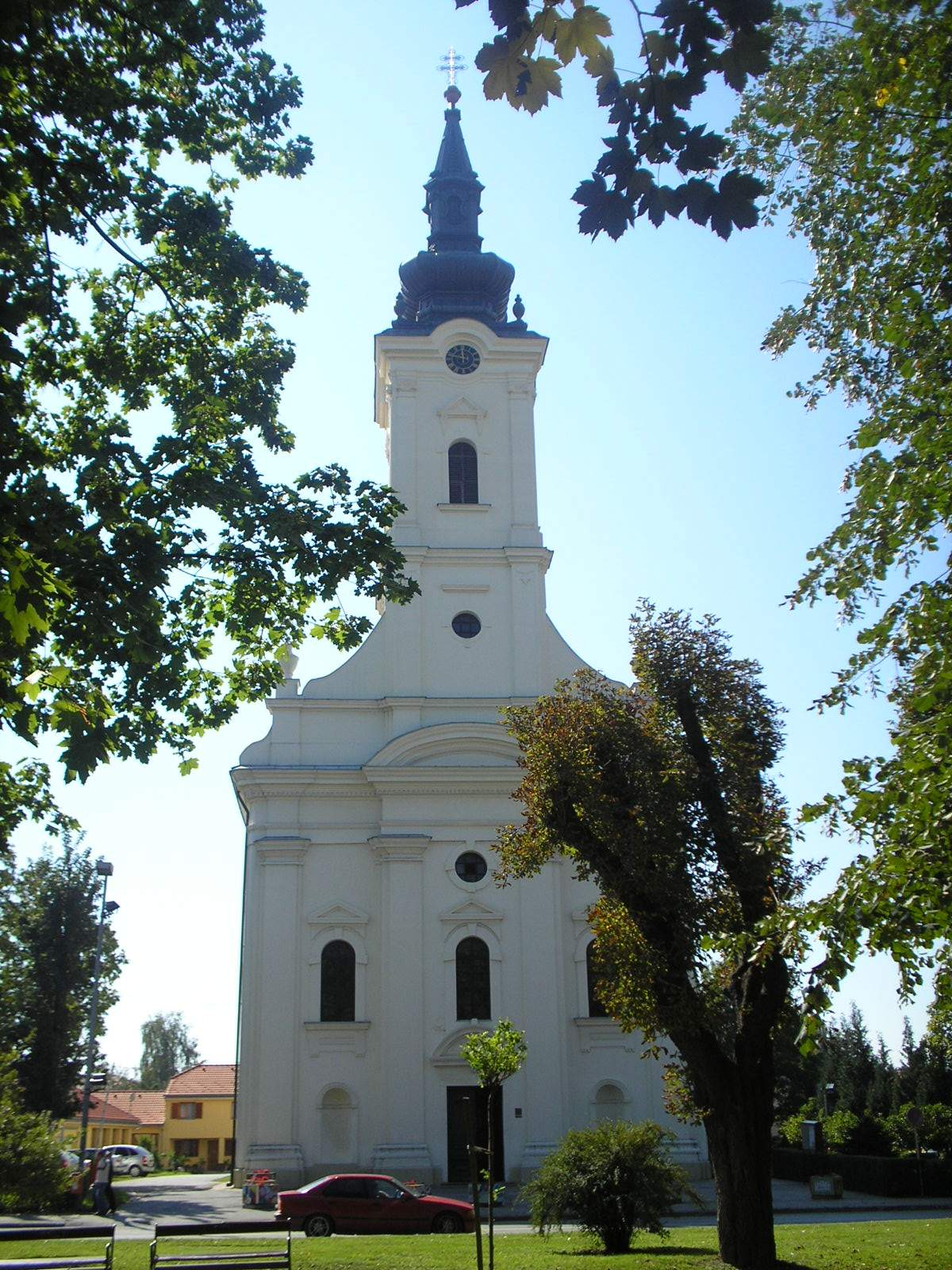
Nova Gradiška Roman Catholic church

== Sports ==
The local chapter of the HPS is HPD "Strmac", which had 37 members in 1936 under the Niko Gržetić presidency. Membership fell to 30 in 1937. Membership rose to 38 in 1938 under the Ivan Baretić presidency.

== Religion ==
Maria Theresa granted the rights for construction of the Roman Catholic Chapel of Teresa of Ávila in Nova Gradiška in 1756. The church was damaged by the forces of the Republic of Serbian Krajina during the Croatian War of Independence. In the 19th century the new Church of Virgin Mary on the town square was initiated. Aulic Council prevented the authorities of the Slavonian Military Frontier from destroying the church with intention to build a school at its place.

Historically, there were also two Serbian Orthodox Churches in Nova Gradiška, one of them destroyed during World War II and one during the Croatian War of Independence. Those were the Church of Saint Nicholas and the Church of the Holy Trinity. The Church of the Holy Trinity was the central orthodox church located at the town square. It was erected in 1824 at the spot of an earlier wooden church from 1755. The church was destructed by the Ustasha regime in 1941. The new neo-Byzantine Church of the Holy Trinity was complete in 1982 but it was detonated 9 times and destroyed during the Croatian War of Independence. The second church of Saint Nicholas was constructed in 1818 on the local cemetery, it was reconstructed in 1866 but it was also destroyed during the Croatian War of Independence.

== Local electronic media ==
Croatian Radio Nova Gradiška (Croatian: Hrvatski Radio Nova Gradiška, HRNG) is the local radio station.

== Commerce ==
Today some furniture industry and beer industry exists in small parts. There is an initiative to extend the industry park.

Before the Croatian War of Independence, there was metallurgy industry in the town, which went bankrupt.

== People ==
- Đura Horvatović – Serbian Officer
- Slavko Brill – sculptor and ceramics artist
- Goran Vlaović – footballer
- Milan Rapaić – footballer
- Marko Malenica – footballer
- Kim Verson – singer
- Mia Pojatina – model and Miss Universe Croatia 2018
- Imakulata Malinka – organist, nun, music pedagogue
- Svetlana Čanak – Scientist
- Adolf Dado Topic - singer
