= Prvča =

- Location within Croatia
- Coordinates: 45°14′35″N 17°21′36″E
- Country: Croatia
- County: Brod-Posavina County
- Municipality: Nova Gradiška

Area
  - Total: 10.6 km^{2} (4.1 sq mi)

Population (2021)
  - Total: 550
  - Density: 52/km^{2} (130/sq mi)
- Time zone: UTC+1 (CET)
  - Summer (DST): UTC+2 (CEST)

Prvča is a village in Brod-Posavina County in Croatia.
