= Janjina =

- Municipality
- Općina Janjina
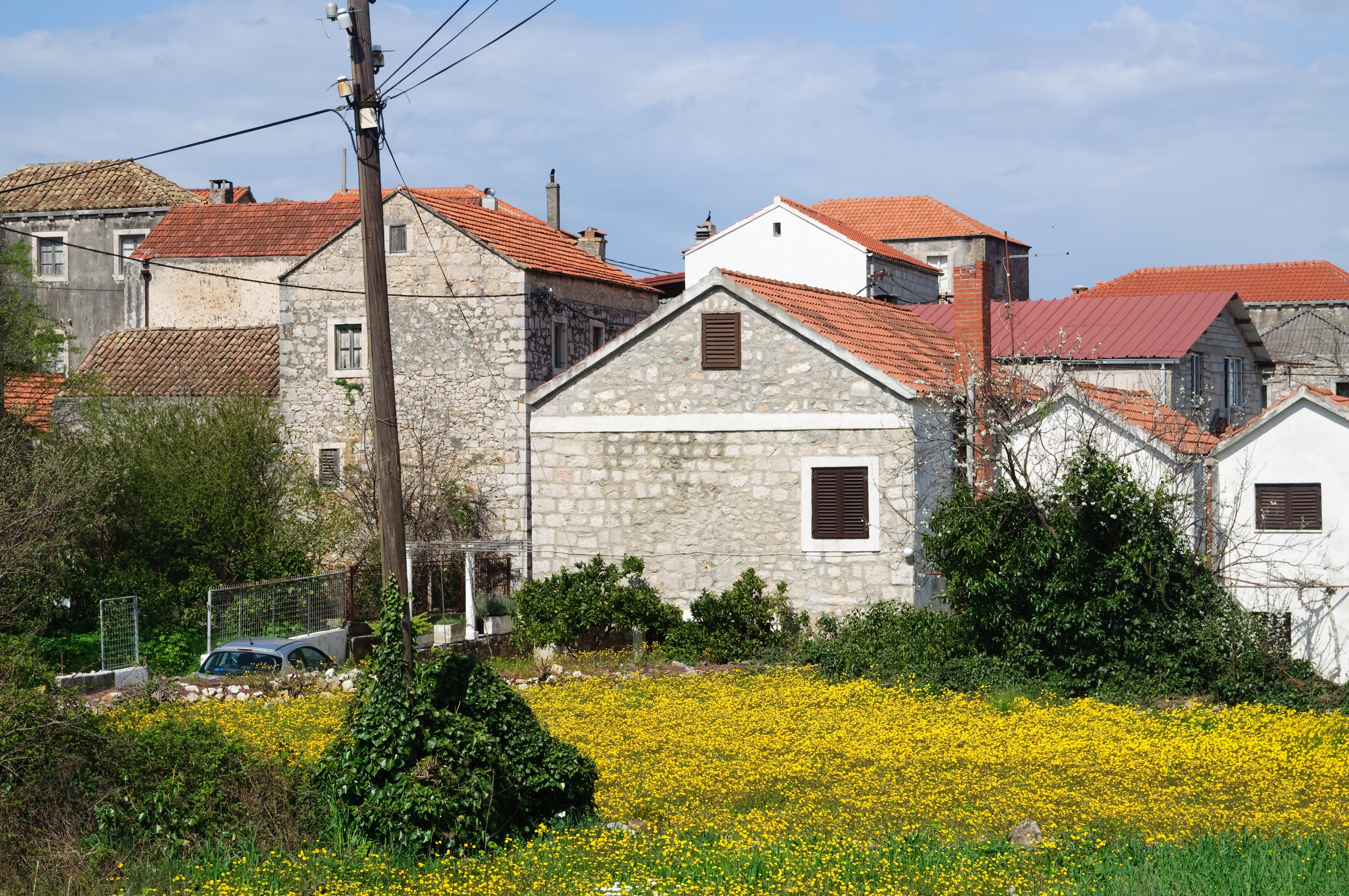

- Location within Croatia
- Coordinates: 42°55′N 17°25′E
- Country: Croatia
- County: Dubrovnik-Neretva County

Government
  - Municipal mayor: Vlatko Mratović (HDZ)

Area
  - Municipality: 30.1 km^{2} (11.6 sq mi)
  - Urban: 6.9 km^{2} (2.7 sq mi)

Population (2021)
  - Municipality: 522
  - Density: 17.3/km^{2} (44.9/sq mi)
  - Urban: 185
  - Urban density: 27/km^{2} (69/sq mi)
- Time zone: UTC+1 (CET)
  - Summer (DST): UTC+2 (CEST)
- Postal code: 20246
- Area code: 020
- Website: janjina.hr

Janjina is a village and a municipality located in the center of the Pelješac peninsula, in the Dubrovnik-Neretva County, Croatia. The municipality was established in 1997; previously this area was part of the Ston municipality.

== Village ==
The village of Janjina includes a tiny fishing harbor and a hamlet called Zabreže (Behind the hill), the name describing its geographic situation. It is divided into five parts: Gornje Selo (The Upper Village) comprising Lovrovići, which together with Bara are known to exist from the 4th century AD. Jaspričići, Prišlići and Dežulovići seem to have been established between the 15th and 16th century.

The meaning of Janjina remains uncertain, but the local belief is that it derives from the female Christian name Janja, a Slavic form of the Hebrew Johanna. The oldest written records about Janjina date back from 1222 AD.

== Demographics ==
According to the 2001 census there were 593 people living in the municipality of Janjina, and the absolute majority were Croats (97.65%).

In 2021, the municipality had 522 residents in the following settlements:

- Drače, population 116
- Janjina, population 185
- Osobjava, population 61
- Popova Luka, population 20
- Sreser, population 140
Janjina: Population trends 1857–2021
v

population	1287	1259	1324	1273	1510	1385	1372	1322	956	926	881	769	595	555	593	551	522
	1857	1869	1880	1890	1900	1910	1921	1931	1948	1953	1961	1971	1981	1991	2001	2011	2021

Sources: Croatian Bureau of Statistics publications

== Notable people ==
- Ivo Lendić (1908–1982), poet

== See also ==
- Croatia
- Dalmatia
