= Danica Širola =

- Born: Danica Vilma Franciska Širola; April 18, 1900; Karlovac, Kingdom of Croatia-Slavonia
- Died: September 2, 1926 (aged 26); Zagreb, Kingdom of Yugoslavia
- Cause of death: tuberculosis
- Venerated in: Archdiocese of Zagreb
- Influences: Ivan Merz
- Major works: Dnevnik ('Diary')

Danica Vilma Franciska Širola (18 April 1900 - 2 September 1926) was a Croatian school teacher, poet and Catholic laywoman, known as a "Teacher of the holy life" and "Croatian Little Flower". Her poems were published in several Croatian Catholic magazines, and during her lifetime she wrote a spiritual diary and an autobiography. At the age of twenty, she took a vow of virginity. She died at the age of 26, with a reputation for holiness, after a two-year battle with tuberculosis. Her collected works were published in 2021 in Zagreb.

== Biography ==
=== Early life and education ===
She was born on 18 April 1900 in Karlovac, as a fourth child of her father Stjepan Širola, school teacher, and mother Ćirila Wyronbaul, a noblewoman. She was baptised as Danica Vilma Franciska. At the age of 2, her family moved to Zagreb due to a father's job. Danica had three brothers (Božidar, Mladen, Branko) and five sisters (Zorka, Marijana, Zlata, Ruža, Mira). Her father Stjepan was also translator and writer, her brother Božidar musicologist and composer, while other brother Mladen was theater and film director and screenwriter.

She attended Donjogradska škola ('Lower Town's School') in Zagreb; although she wanted to attend a convent, she didn't dare express her wish to her parents. After school, she usually stopped by the church of the Sisters of Charity in Frankopanska Street to pray before the Blessed Sacrament. She received her First Communion in 1908, about which she wrote in her autobiography:

It was a great day for me. I repeated to Jesus all my promises and all my desires. Jesus was in my heart. Since the day of my first Holy Communion, I don't think a single Sunday or holiday has passed without Jesus coming into my heart. And I did it because I imagined that Jesus had told me himself that He wanted me to receive Him often. No one had ever told me about receiving Holy Communion frequently, nor did anyone know that I went to Holy Communion so often. I went because I was convinced that Jesus wanted me to do so.

Observing the taking of religious vows in the Church of St. Vincent de Paul in 1911, she desired to become a nun. After finishing elementary school, she enrolled in a girls' high school. In the fourth grade, she was accepted into the Congregation of Mary. At that time, she rejected the courtship of a young pharmacist who often wrote her letters from the battlefields of World War I, which she explained in her diary: "I promised Jesus a long time ago, not only promised but gave my heart and soul. Yes, I gave my whole self to the Savior."

She attended preparatory school led by nuns. She regularly went to Holy Mass and developed a devotion to the Eucharist and the Sacred Heart. She soon began to bleed, causing her health to deteriorate in the third grade; parents sent her to Primorje, where she recovered.

=== Teaching ===
As a young teacher in 1919, she was first employed as a visiting lecturer at the Borongaj School, where her father Stjepan was the principal, and then at the Girls' Elementary School on Kaptol. Although she wanted to go to the Ursuline convent in Varaždin immediately after graduation, her parents and brothers were against it.

At the age of twenty, on the Feast of Corpus Christi, she took a lifelong vow of virginity, about which she wrote on June 3, 1920 in her autobiography:

Jesus, I have You and I seek nothing more. I have You, I have everything. Who is richer and happier than me? For Jesus has become today the eternal fiancé of my soul. Jesus, nothing in me is mine anymore, everything is Yours, and You work with me as with Your own property, according to Your holy will. Jesus, guard what is Yours.

Soon, she went to work as a teacher in Krašić, where, at the urging of the parish priest, she taught religious education (vjeronauk) and prepared children for their First Communion. She used her teaching salary to support her family and her brother Branko, who was studying in Prague. She was saving the rest of the money for her severance pay to the monastery, and the sisters forgave her dowry. Father wanted her to enroll in the Higher Pedagogical School and to go to the Sisters of Charity in Zagreb, not the Ursulines, which she accepted. Her parents opposed her religious vocation, and she wrote her father's words in her diary: "As long as I am alive, Danica will not enter a monastery!"

=== Catholic and social work ===
She made a pilgrimage to Rome, and traveled to Vienna, Prague and Belgrade. In Sarajevo, she visited archbishop Ivan Šarić, with whom she discussed her vocation; they later exchanged several letters. She also visited Knin, Šibenik, Split, Makarska, Omiš, Metković, Mostar and Herceg-Novi. From Krašić, she wrote to the Jesuits in Zagreb, especially to Father Josip Vrbanek, her high school spiritual director, who was also the editor of the Glasnik ('Herald') and Kalendar Srca Isusova ('Calendar of the Sacred Heart'), in which her poems were published. She often asked Father Vrbanek for the issues of Glasnik and prayer books to the Heart of Jesus, which she promoted among pupils and people of Krašić. Danica corresponded with the Ursulines in Varaždin, who addressed her in their letters as "our dear Danica".

== Memory ==
She was included in Famous and meritorius Croats and noteworthy people in Croatian history from 925-1925 with a biographical article.

On the occasion of the 95th anniversary of her death, a memorial plaque was placed on her family grave at Zagreb's Mirogoj Cemetery.

== Sources ==
Literature

- Buljan, Slavica (2017). Miomiris Božje ljubavi : Danica Širola 1900.-1926 (in Croatian). Zagreb. ISBN 9789539748676.
- Buljan, Slavica (2020). Danica Širola : djevojka sveta života i blažene smrti : Karlovac 1900. - Zagreb 1926 (in Croatian). Zagreb. (Web)
- Buljan, Slavica (2021). Autobiografija, dnevnik, korespodencija i pjesme Danice Širola [Autobiography, diary, correspondence and poems of Danica Širola] (in Croatian). Zagreb: Filozofsko-teološki institut Družbe Isusove. ISBN 9789532311877.

Web

- Buljan, Slavica (9 May 2021). "Uz 25. godišnjicu smrti uzorne djevojke Danice Širole otkrivamo njezin portret: Djevojka sveta života i blažene smrti" [On the 25th anniversary of the death of the exemplary girl Danica Širola, we reveal her portrait: A girl of holy life and blessed death]. Prilika (Glas Koncila) (in Croatian). No. 4.
- "Danica Širola". putksuncu.hr (in Croatian). Bl. Ivan Merz Postulature.
- "Postavljena nadgrobna ploča Božjoj ugodnici Danici Široli" [Tombstone erected for the God's servant Danica Širola]. ika.hkm.hr (in Croatian). Informativna katolička agencija. 16 October 2021.
