= Sarah Ćosić =

Croatian model and beauty pageant titleholder

- Born: 14 April 1989 (age 37); Split, SR Croatia, SFR Yugoslavia
- Height: 1.78 m (5 ft 10 in)
- Beauty pageant titleholder
- Title: Miss Universe Hrvatske 2009
- Hair color: Brown
- Eye color: Brown
- Major competitions: Miss Universe Hrvatske 2009 (Winner); Miss Universe 2009 (Top 15)

Sarah Ćosić (born 14 April 1989) is a Croatian model and beauty pageant titleholder who was crowned Miss Universe Hrvatske 2009. She represented her country in the Miss Universe 2009 and was placed Top 15.

== Early life ==
Ćosić works as a model in Split, Croatia.

== Pageantry ==
=== Miss Universe Hrvatske 2009 ===
Ćosić was crowned as Miss Universe Hrvatske 2009.

=== Miss Universe 2009 ===
Ćosić competed at the Miss Universe 2009 in Bahamas. She was the first Croatian representative to place in Miss Universe.

Awards and achievements
Preceded by Snježana Lončarević	Miss Universe Croatia; 2009	Succeeded by Lana Obad
