= Živko Kustić =

Croatian writer (1930–2014)

- Born: 12 December 1930; Split, Kingdom of Yugoslavia
- Died: 19 July 2014 (aged 83); Zagreb, Croatia
- Education: University of Zagreb
- Occupation: Writer

Živko Kustić (12 December 1930 – 19 July 2014) was a Croatian journalist and writer. Kustić studied mathematics, physics, and theology at the University of Zagreb before being ordained as a priest of the Greek Catholic Church of Croatia and Serbia in Žumberak in 1958. He was the editor of Roman Catholic Archdiocese of Zagreb-published weekly Glas Koncila from 1963 until 1990. In 1993, Kustić was appointed the first editor-in-chief of the Information Catholic Agency established by the Episcopal Conference of Croatia. He held the position until 1999. Kustić died in Zagreb in 2014. During the Croatian Spring, among many others, Kustić was accused of stirring up Croatian nationalist views.
