= Zvonik =

Croatian Roman Catholic magazine

Zvonik is a Roman Catholic magazine founded by Croat priests from the Roman Catholic Diocese of Subotica. It is published in Croatian.

== History and mission ==
It was founded on September 19, 1994, in Bač, "in the shadow of the campanile of a 13th century Franciscan church". The first issue of this magazine came out in November 1994, on the feast of All Saints. The magazine is named after that campanile, the oldest one in the Roman Catholic Bishopric of Subotica. Initial financing for the publishing of this magazine came from the Croat priests themselves. Formally, the publisher of Zvonik is Vicariate of St. Roque in Subotica, but in reality, it's being published by the Publishing Section of Roman Catholic Institute for Culture, History and Spirituality Ivan Antunović from Subotica. On October 20, 1994, the magazine was registered with the Ministry of information of the Republic of Serbia. The purpose and goals of the magazine were described in the first issue of Zvonik: "following of events in the life of Church at Croats in Bishopric of Subotica, as well as events in the life of other Roman Catholic believers – Hungarians, Slovaks, Germans and other peoples that live in this Bishopric – the life of Church in general and reporting about all important events." Also, it was announced that this magazine "will promote prayer, gratitude and glorifying of God or acts of contrition because of personal sins and sins of the world.". Regular sections are: "Upoznajmo Bibliju", "Katekizam katoličke crkve", "II. vatikanski koncil", "Obitelj", "Mladi", "Djeca", "Meditacija", "Zajedno na liturgiji", "Svetac mjeseca", "Vjernici pitaju", "Kreposti naših predaka" (Let's learn more about Bible, Catechism of Catholic Church, Vatican Council II, Family, Youth, Children, Meditation, Together on Liturgy, Saint of the Month, Believers Ask, Virility of Our Ancestors).

== Editors ==
Andrija Anišić was the editor for many years. Ervin and Katarina Čeliković were part of Editorial Council.

== Known associates ==
- Marija Maja Dulić, Croatian writer from Bačka
- Andrija Kopilović, Croatian writer, priest and theologist from Bačka
- Ivanka Brađašević, Croatian writer

== Awards ==
In 2000, the multiannual editor of Zvonik, Andrija Anišić, won Antušova nagrada for his work as editor, a prestigious award of Croats of Vojvodina.
