= Ivana Mišura =

Croatian model and beauty pageant titleholder

- Born: Ivana Mišura; 1989 (age 36–37); Zagreb, Croatia
- Height: 1.71 m (5 ft 7 1/2 in)
- Beauty pageant titleholder
- Title: Miss Universe Hrvatske 2014
- Hair color: Dark brown
- Eye color: Blue
- Major competitions: Miss Universe Hrvatske 2014 (Winner); Miss Universe 2014 (Unplaced)

Ivana Mišura (born 1989) is a Croatian model and beauty pageant titleholder who was crowned Miss Universe Hrvatske 2014. She represented her country in the Miss Universe 2014 pageant.

== Early life ==
Ivana Mišura works as a model in Zagreb, Croatia.

== Pageantry ==
=== Miss Universe Hrvatske 2014 ===
Mišura was crowned as Miss Universe Hrvatske 2014, held at the Marina Cvetkovića Sports Complex in the coastal resort town of Opatija.

=== Miss Universe 2014 ===
Mišura competed at the Miss Universe 2014 but Unplaced.

Awards and achievements
Preceded by Melita Fabečić	Miss Universe Croatia; 2014	Succeeded by Barbara Ljiljak
