= Sreser =

- Village
- Location within Croatia
- Coordinates: 42.9452487°N 17.4064871°E
- Country: Croatia
- County: Dubrovnik-Neretva County
- Municipality: Janjina

Area
  - Total: 2.8 sq mi (7.2 km^{2})

Population (2021)
  - Total: 140
  - Density: 50/sq mi (19/km^{2})
- Time zone: UTC+1 (CET)
  - Summer (DST): UTC+2 (CEST)

Sreser is a village in Croatia, located on the Pelješac peninsula.

== Demographics ==
According to the 2021 census, its population was 140.
