= Marijana Rupčić =

Croatian model (born 1986)

- Born: 1986 (age 39–40)
- Occupation: Model

Marijana Rupčić (born c. 1986) is a Croatian model. She was Miss Universe Croatia in 2004.
