= Kovačevac (Nova Gradiška) =

- Location within Croatia
- Coordinates: 45°15′54″N 17°21′22″E
- Country: Croatia
- County: Brod-Posavina County
- Municipality: Nova Gradiška

Area
  - Total: 8.8 km^{2} (3.4 sq mi)

Population (2021)
  - Total: 562
  - Density: 64/km^{2} (170/sq mi)
- Time zone: UTC+1 (CET)
  - Summer (DST): UTC+2 (CEST)

Kovačevac is a village in Brod-Posavina County in Croatia.

== Religion ==
Local Roman Catholic chapel of Saint Vinko was erected in the village in mid-1960s.
