= Barbara Ljiljak =

Croatian model

- Born: Barbara Ljiljak; February 7, 1989 (age 37); Split, Split-Dalmatia, Croatia
- Height: 1.76 m (5 ft 9 in)
- Beauty pageant titleholder
- Title: Miss Universe Hrvatske 2015
- Hair color: Brown
- Eye color: Green
- Major competitions: Miss Universe Hrvatske 2015 (Winner)

Barbara Ljiljak (born 1989) is a Croatian model and beauty pageant titleholder who was crowned Miss Universe Hrvatske 2015. She was supposed to represent Croatia at Miss Universe 2015 but withdrew due to an arm injury.

== Personal life ==
Ljiljak is working as a Fashion Designer in Croatia.

=== Miss Universe Croatia 2015 ===
On June 7, 2015, Ljiljak crowned Miss Universe Croatia 2015 in the Crystal Ballroom at Hotel The Westin Zagreb, Croatia represented Split. Twenty contestants from across Croatia competed for the crown. While Miss Zadar, Alma Fabulić and Miss Krapina-Zagorje, Mirta Laura Kustan crowned the runners-up of the event

Awards and achievements
Preceded by Ivana Mišura	Miss Universe Croatia; 2015	Succeeded by Barbara Filipović
