= Ljupina =

- Location within Croatia
- Coordinates: 45°12′50″N 17°22′23″E
- Country: Croatia
- County: Brod-Posavina County
- Municipality: Nova Gradiška

Area
  - Total: 14.2 km^{2} (5.5 sq mi)

Population (2021)
  - Total: 758
  - Density: 53.4/km^{2} (138/sq mi)
- Time zone: UTC+1 (CET)
  - Summer (DST): UTC+2 (CEST)

Ljupina is a village in Brod-Posavina County in Croatia.

== Religion ==
Local Roman Catholic church was firstly mentioned in 1758. It was a wooden structure next to which a new brick construction was contented in 1980.
