= Eva Kirchmayer-Bilić =

Croatian musician and professor

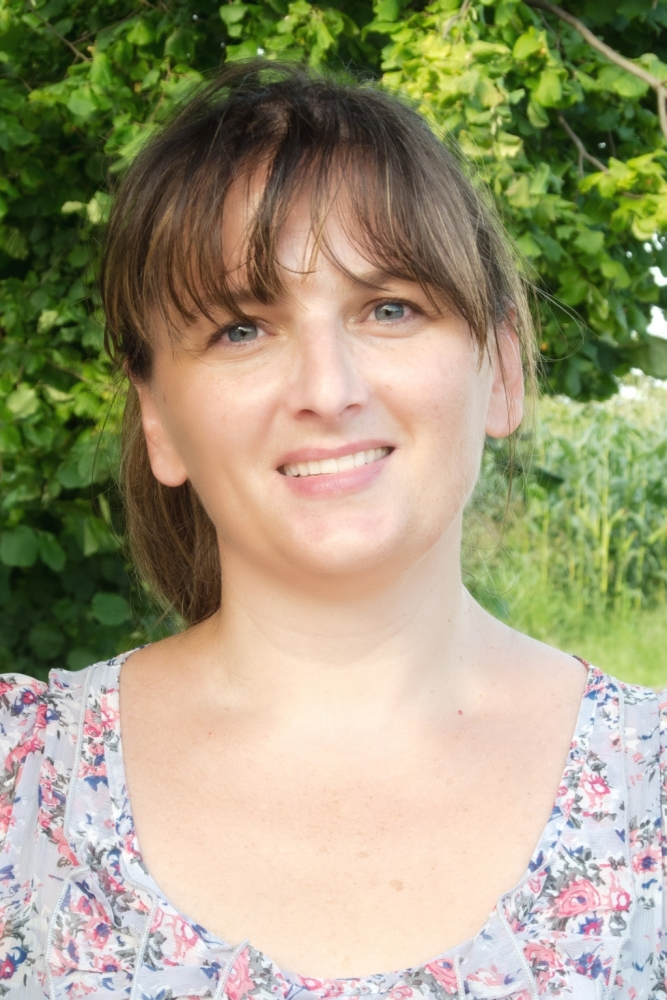
Eva Kirchmayer-Bilić

Eva Kirchmayer-Bilić (born 1971), is a Croatian pianist, organist, university professor at the Academy of Music in Zagreb, journalist and publicist.

She graduated (1992) and received her master's degree at the Academy of Music in Zagreb in the class of the professor Stjepan Radić. She also studied organ at the Institute of the liturgical music "Albe Vidaković" (1985–1990) in the class of Imakulata Malinka and later, thanks to the DAAD scholarship, at the Hochschule für Musik und darstellende Kunst in Frankfurt am Main in the class of the professor Andreas Meyer-Hermann. She attended seminars by Melita Lorković, Rudolf Kehrer, Vladimir Krpan, Charles Spencer, Jurica Murai et al. She organised a concert tour of piano-vocal duos, performing with Hartmut Höll, Marciej Pikulski, Peter Schreier, Valentina Fijačko, Kristina Beck-Kukavčić in Belgium, Croatia, (Germany), Poland as a part of Masterclass for duo voice & piano 2010/11 season.

She performed with musical ensembles (Collegium pro musica sacra), choirs (Zagrebački dječaci), Croatian Armed Forces Band, Zagreb Philharmonic Orchestra, Zagreb Soloists in Slovenia, Italy, Austria, (Germany), Ireland, Ukraine and Egypt, United States (Wisconsin).

She is and editor of the musical section in Hrvatsko slovo. She writes for Glas Koncila and Saint Cecilia. She was a co-author of the several musical textbooks, member of Croatian society of musicians and of the Senate of the Academy of Music in Zagreb (since 2013). She actively participated in the Second Sinode of the Archdiocese of Zagreb.
