= Miss Universe Croatia =

National beauty pageant competition in Croatia

Miss Universe Croatia National Beauty Pageant
- Formation: 1997; 29 years ago
- Type: Beauty pageant
- Headquarters: Zagreb
- Location: Croatia
- Members: Miss Universe
- Official language: Croatian
- President: Vladimir Kraljević
- Website: www.miss-universe-croatia.hr

Miss Universe Croatia (Croatian: Miss Universe Hrvatske) is a national beauty pageant which decides Croatia's contestant at the Miss Universe finals.

== History ==
The Miss Universe Croatia has been held annually since 1997 in under Vladimir Kraljevic who also successfully took the official franchise of Miss Universe Slovenia in 2013. In 2015 Barbara Ljiljak of Split-Dalmatia won the 2015 edition of the pageant but was not able to participate in Miss Universe due to an arm injury. 2nd-Runner Up of Miss Universe Croatia 2015 Mirta Kuštan of Krapinske Toplice took over as Croatia's representative to Miss Universe 2015. Ljiljak was never stripped of her title.

== Titleholders ==
- : Declared as Winner
- : Ended as runner-up or top 5/6 qualification
- : Ended as one of the finalists or semifinalists
- : Ended as special awards winner

Year	County	Hometown	Miss Universe Hrvatske	Placement at Miss Universe	Special Award(s)
2026	City of Zagreb	Zagreb	Antea Mršić	TBA	
2025	Zadar	Zadar	Laura Gnjatović	Top 30	
2024	Dubrovnik-Neretva	Dubrovnik	Zrinka Ćorić	Unplaced	
2023	Lika-Senj	Perušić	Andrea Erjavec	Unplaced	
2022	Krapina-Zagorje	Krapina	Arijana Podgajski	Unplaced	
2021	Dubrovnik	Dubrovnik	Ora Antonia Ivanišević	Unplaced	
2020	Zadar	Zadar	Mirna Naiia Marić	Unplaced	
2019	Dubrovnik-Neretva	Korčula	Mia Rkman	Top 20	
2018	Brod-Posavina	Nova Gradiška	Mia Pojatina	Unplaced	
2017	Brod-Posavina	Slavonski Brod	Shanaelle Petty	Top 16	
2016	City of Zagreb	Zagreb	Barbara Filipović	Unplaced	
2015	Krapina-Zagorje	Krapinske Toplice	Mirta Kuštan	Unplaced	
2015	Split-Dalmatia	Split	Barbara Ljiljak	Did not compete ― Withdrew at Miss Universe 2015, due to accident. A Second Runner-up took over the title of Miss Universe Croatia after the main winner or the first runner-up did not present at Miss Universe 2015.	
2014	City of Zagreb	Zagreb	Ivana Mišura	Unplaced	
2013	City of Zagreb	Zagreb	Melita Fabečić	Unplaced	
2012	Vukovar-Srijem	Vrbanja	Elizabeta Burg	Top 16	
2011	City of Zagreb	Zagreb	Natalija Prica	Unplaced	
2010	City of Zagreb	Zagreb	Lana Obad	Unplaced	
2009	Split-Dalmatia	Split	Sarah Ćosić	Top 15	
2008	City of Zagreb	Zagreb	Snježana Lončarević	Unplaced	
2007	Split-Dalmatia	Split	Jelena Maros	Unplaced	
2006	Split-Dalmatia	Split	Biljana Mančić	Unplaced	
2005	Karlovac	Plaški	Jelena Glišić	Unplaced	
2004	Vukovar-Srijem	Nuštar	Marijana Rupčić	Unplaced	
2003	Primorje-Gorski Kotar	Rijeka	Ivana Delač	Unplaced	
2002	Istria	Pazin	Ivana Paris	Unplaced	
2001	Primorje-Gorski Kotar	Rijeka	Maja Cecić-Vidoš	Unplaced	
2000	Split-Dalmatia	Split	Renata Lovrinčević	Unplaced	
1999	Šibenik-Knin	Šibenik	Marijana Kužina	Unplaced	
1998	Dubrovnik-Neretva	Dubrovnik	Ivana Gržetić	Unplaced	
1997	Split-Dalmatia	Split	Kristina Čerina	Unplaced	

== 2015 ==
Miss Universe Croatia
- Date: June 7, 2015
- Venue: Hotel Westin, Zagreb, Croatia
- Entrants: 20
- Winner: Barbara Ljiljak, Split-Dalmatia, Split

Miss Universe Croatia 2015, the 19th Miss Universe Croatia pageant, was held on June 7, 2015, in the Crystal Ballroom at Hotel The Westin Zagreb, Croatia. Ivana Mišura, Miss Universe Croatia 2014 of Zagreb crowned Barbara Ljiljak as her successor at the end of the event. Ljiljak broke her arm days before the Miss Universe 2015 competition began and was replaced by Mirta Laura Kustan as Croatia's representative to Miss Universe that year. Ljiljak retained the title. Twenty contestants from across Croatia competed for the crown.

=== Results ===
Final Results	Contestant
Miss Universe Croatia 2015	Barbara Ljiljak - Split-Dalmatia, Split
1st Runner-up	Alma Fabulić - Zadar County, Zadar
2nd Runner-up	Mirta Laura Kuštan - Krapina-Zagorje, Krapinske Toplice
Top 5	Biljana Ikić - Vukovar-Syrmia County, Vukovar; Matea Kovačević - Zagreb County, Sesvetski Kraljevac

=== Contestants ===
20 Contestants were selected from across Croatia, below are Miss Universe Croatia candidates in the Top 20 of the pageant selection.

Contestant	Hometown	Age	Height	Background
Barbara Gaković	City of Zagreb, Zagreb	25	175	Student of Economics
Ivella Petričić	City of Zagreb, Zagreb	21	177	Student of Law
Klara Babić	City of Zagreb, Zagreb	18	176	Student of Tourism
Lucija Soldo	City of Zagreb, Zagreb	20	170	Student of Economics
Marija Ujević	City of Zagreb, Zagreb	22	176	Student of Economics
Mateja Martinović	City of Zagreb, Zagreb	19	174	Student of Tourism
Zrinka Kučinić	Dubrovnik-Neretva, Ploče	19	178	Student of Law
Ivana Jakin	Karlovac County, Karlovac	20	170	Student of Law
Mirta Kuštan	Krapina-Zagorje, Krapinske Toplice	22	178	Student of Law
Robertina Preklushaj	Lika-Senj, Senj	21	178	Student of Textile
Ana Juretić	Primorje-Gorski Kotar, Rijeka	19	176	Pianist
Adriana Bekavac	Split-Dalmatia, Brela	22	169	Model
Emanuela Polić	Split-Dalmatia, Kaštel Kambelovac	20	176	Director
Doris Bajkuša	Split-Dalmatia, Omiš	23	173	Student of Economics
Barbara Ljiljak	Split-Dalmatia, Split	26	176	Fashion Designer
Biljana Ikić	Vukovar-Syrmia County, Vukovar	21	178	Student of Education Science
Alma Fabulić	Zadar County, Zadar	19	171	Ballerina
Katarina Čičak	Zagreb County, Rugvica	19	175	Restaurant Owner
Matea Kovačević	Zagreb County, Sesvetski Kraljevac	21	175	Interior Designer
Marina Barun	Zagreb County, Zaprešić	18	167	Make-up Artist

== 2016 ==
Miss Universe Croatia
- Date: April 15, 2016
- Venue: Hotel Westin, Zagreb, Croatia
- Entrants: 19
- Placements: 10
- Winner: Barbara Filipović, Zagreb

Miss Universe Croatia 2016, the 20th Miss Universe Croatia pageant, was held on April 15, 2016, in the Crystal Ballroom at Hotel Westin in Zagreb, Croatia. Barbara Ljiljak, Miss Universe Croatia 2015 of Split-Dalmatia crowned Barbara Filipović as her successor at the end of the event. Nineteen contestants from across Croatia competed for the crown.

=== Results ===
Final Results	Contestant
Miss Universe Croatia 2016	Barbara Filipović - Zagreb
1st Runner-up	Paula Čaić - Vukovar
2nd Runner-up	Marija Kljajić - Slavonski Brod
Top 5	Anna Maria Matoina; Antonela Zupčić
Top 10	Josipa Rašić; Ivona Blažun; Ivana Klobasa; Petra Jakšić; Jeanette Tadić
Awards	Miss fotogeničnosti - Marija Kljajić; Miss simpatičnosti - Paula Čaić

=== Contestants ===
Contestant	Hometown	Age
Antea Ćelić	Split	20
Antonela Zupčić	Zadar	26
Barbara Filipović	Zagreb	18
Doris Pranjić	Poreč	19
Doris Smogar	Donji Stupnik	25
Ivana Klobasa	Mljet	21
Ivona Blažun	Zagreb	18
Jeanette Tadić	Ogulin	26
Josipa Rašić	Sesvete	22
Marija Kljajić	Slavonski Brod	25
Marina Kralj	Zagreb	24
Minea Pejić	Zagreb	20
Nives Jekić	Zagreb	19
Paula Čaić	Split-Dalmatia, Vukovar	18
Petra Jakšić	Brač	20
Valentina Violić	Dubrovnik	23
Suzana Violić	Dubrovnik	20
Anna Maria Matoina	Zagreb	20
Iva Petrinšak	Murter	25
