= Morea Banićević =

Croatian writer

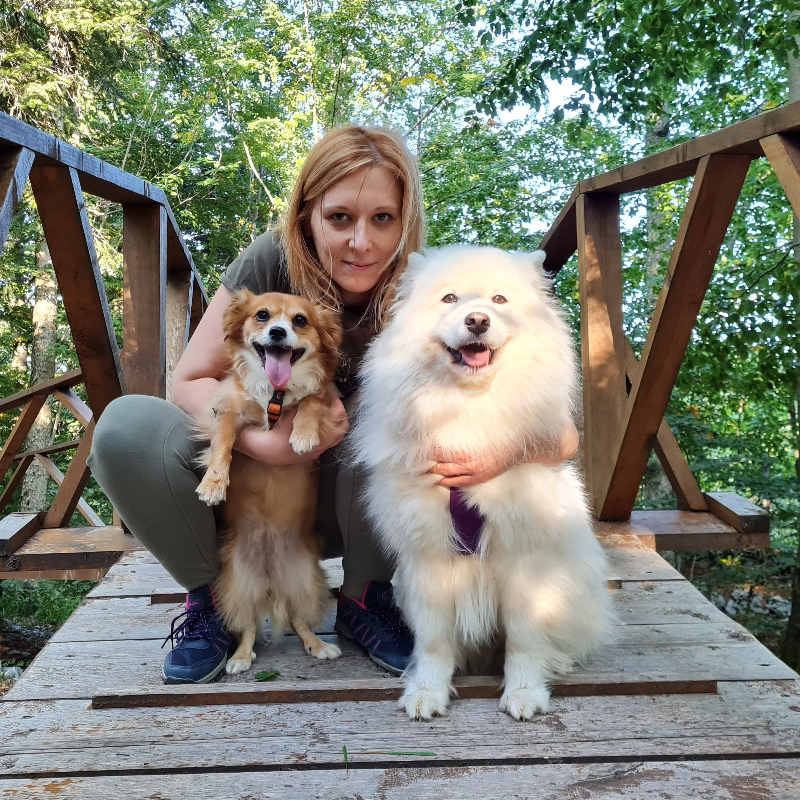
- Born: 13 February 1981 (age 45); Rijeka, Croatia
- Occupation: writer

Morea Banićević (born 13 February 1981) is a Croatian writer.

== Biography ==
Morea Banićević was born in Rijeka and graduated from the Faculty of Humanities and Social Sciences in Rijeka, majoring in Croatian and English language. Over the years, she has written a number of novels for children and young adults, which are being published in Croatia and abroad.

== Awards and honours ==
- Demon školske knjižnice (School library demon) - Sfera award in the category of best novel, 2015
- Demon školske knjižnice (School library demon) was also selected for the National Project to encourage reading and promote the reading culture of children and young people by Reading to the Stars
- Dvojnici iz tame (Doubles from Darkness) - Sfera award in the category of best novel for children and the Grigor Vitez Pticica award for the best novel as chosen by the children's jury, as well as the praise of the Grigor Vitez award for popularizing the fantasy genre among children and young people, 2019
- Mjesečari Monteriera (The Sleepwalkers of Monterier) - Anto Gardaš award for the best children's novel, 2022
- Izgubljeni gospodin Kovač (The Lost Mr. Kovač) - Sfera award in the category of best novel for children, 2025
- Izgubljeni gospodin Kovač (The Lost Mr. Kovač) - Grigor Vitez for literary text for young people (Naklada Ljevak, Zagreb) and Grigor Vitez Ptičica in the category of best prose, poetry or drama book (Naklada Ljevak, Zagreb), 2025.
- Izgubljeni gospodin Kovač (The Lost Mr. Kovač) - Croatian candidate for the IBBY Honorary List 2026.
- Izgubljeni gospodin Kovač - „Artefakt“ prize (for the best literary work in the fantasy, science fiction and horror genres)
- Izgubljeni gospodin Kovač - regional award „Mali princ“ (for the best children's book in the linguistic area of Bosnia and Herzegovina, Montenegro, Croatia and Serbia)

== Bibliography ==
Croatia

- Demon školske knjižnice (Algoritam, Zagreb, 2015)
- Demon školske knjižnice (Hangar 7, Zagreb, 2019)
- Dvojnici iz tame (Hangar 7, Zagreb, 2019)
- Mjesečari Monteriera (Naklada Ljevak, Zagreb, 2022)
- Izgubljeni gospodin Kovač (Naklada Ljevak, Zagreb, 2024)
- Sreća se ne mjeri decibelima (Naklada Ljevak, Zagreb, 2026)

Serbia

- Demon školske biblioteke (Laguna, Belgrade, 2016)
- Dvojnici iz tame (Laguna, Belgrade, 2017)
- Tragovima Crnog Petra (Laguna, Belgrade, 2019)
- Mjesečari Monteriera (Laguna, Belgrade, 2021)

North Macedonia

- Демонот од училишната библиотека (Antolog, Skopje, 2021)
- Двојниците од темнината (Antolog, Skopje, 2022)
- По трагите на Црниот Петар (Antolog, Skopje, 2023)
