= Ray Kirchmeyer =

American football player and coach

Playing career

Football
- 1923–1925: Columbia

Basketball
- 1923–1926: Columbia
- Positions: Fullback (football); Center (basketball)

Coaching career (HC unless noted)

Football
- 1928–1932: Wagner College
- 1937–1946: Wagner College

Basketball
- 1929–1934: Wagner College

Head coaching record
- Overall: 29–39–4 (football); 16–36 (basketball)

Ray Kirchmeyer was an American college football and college basketball player and coach. He played football at Columbia University from 1923 to 1925 and was later the head football and basketball coach at Wagner College on Staten Island.

== Early years ==
Kirchmeyer attended Technical High School in Buffalo, New York, where he played football and basketball.

Kirchmeyer played college football as a fullback for Columbia from 1923 to 1925. In a game rated as one of the greatest upsets in Columbia's football history, Kirchmeyer ran 60 yards for a touchdown against Army in 1925. He also starred for the Columbia basketball team that won the Eastern Intercollegiate Basketball League championship of 1925–26.

He also reportedly played professional football for Dan Blaine's Staten Island Stapletons in the National Football League.

== Coaching career ==
In September 1928, Kirchmeyer was hired as the head football coach at Wagner College on Staten Island.

He served as the head football coach at Wagner College in Staten Island, New York from 1928 to 1932 and 1937 to 1946. Wagner did not field a team from 1942 to 1945 due to World War II. In 11 seasons as head football coach at Wagner, he compiled a 29–39–4 record.

Kirchmeyer also practice law on Staten Island.

== Head coaching record ==
=== Football ===
Year	Team	Overall	Conference	Standing	Bowl/playoffs
Wagner College (Metropolitan Collegiate Conference) (1928–1929)
1928	Wagner College	1–3–1	1–2–1	4th	
1929	Wagner College	1–7	0–4	5th	
Wagner College (Independent) (1930–1932)
1930	Wagner College	4–5			
1931	Wagner College	3–4			
1932	Wagner College	2–2–2			
Wagner College (Independent) (1937–1946)
1937	Wagner College	0–5			
1938	Wagner College	4–2			
1939	Wagner College	4–1–1			
1940	Wagner College	4–2			
1941	Wagner College	5–1			
1942	No team—World War II				
1943	No team—World War II				
1944	No team—World War II				
1945	No team—World War II				
1946	Wagner College	1–6			
Wagner College:		29–39–4	1–6–1		
Total:		29–39–4			
