= Mia Pojatina =

Croatian beauty pageant winner

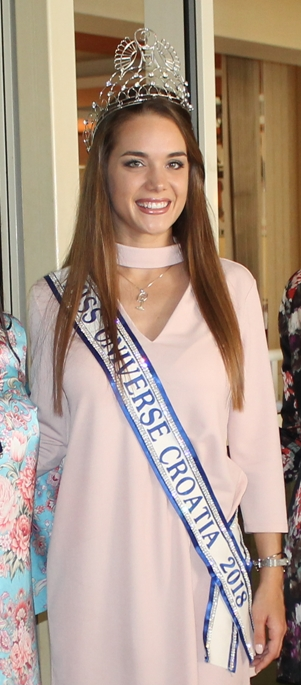
- Pojatina in 2018
- Born: Mia Pojatina; 1995 (age 30–31); Nova Gradiška, Croatia
- Height: 1.78 m (5 ft 10 in)
- Beauty pageant titleholder
- Title: Miss Universe Croatia 2018
- Hair color: Brown
- Eye color: Green
- Major competitions: Miss Universe Croatia 2018 (Winner) (Miss Photogenic); Miss Universe 2018 (Unplaced)

Mia Pojatina (born 1995) is a Croatian model and beauty pageant who was crowned Miss Universe Croatia 2018 on 22 April 2018. She represented Croatia at Miss Universe 2018 pageant in Bangkok, Thailand.

== Personal life ==
Pojatina graduated from Medical Laboratory Diagnosis at the Zagreb University in Healthcare Department. She is a Volleyball player and a pianist for fifteen years. She married Filip Žaja in September 2021.

== Pageantry ==
=== Miss Universe Croatia 2018 ===
Pojatina was crowned Miss Universe Croatia 2018 held on 21 April 2018 in Zagreb. She was crowned by last year's winner and Miss Universe 2017 Top 16 Semifinalist Shanaelle Petty.

=== Miss Universe 2018 ===
Pojatina represented her country at 2018 year's Miss Universe 2018 competition, but didn't reach the top 20.

Awards and achievements
Preceded by Shanaelle Petty	Miss Universe Croatia; 2018	Succeeded by Mia Rkman
