= Imakulata Malinka =

Croatian organist (1935–2019)

Imakulata Malinka (21 February 1935 – 23 August 2019) was a Croatian organist, nun, music pedagogue, choirmaster and church musician, longstanding organist of the Zagreb cathedral. She is an author of several scientific papers known for their efforts to respect, reconcile and combine Gregorian chant and classic polyphonical traditions with popular ecclesiastical music (folk songs).

She was born as a sixth child in the family of Rudolf and Marija (née Kovačević) in Nova Gradiška and baptized as Bernardica. On 25 August 1951 she entered the monastery of the Our Lady's nuns in Zagreb, where she studied organs and musical theory at the Academy of Music in Zagreb (1960–65), under the mentorship of Vlasta Hranilović. Furthermore, she educated at the Papal Institute of sacral music in Regensburg (1967) as well as lectured piano, organ and musical theory at the Institute for church music "Albe Vidaković" in Zagreb for thirty-one years (1968–99). She performed in St. Gallen, Überlingen, Regensburg, and Weingarten (West Germany).

In the collaboration with Željko Petrač in 1972 Malinka established Collegium pro musica sacra, that in 1996 won silver medal at the International church choirs competition "Perluigi da Palestrina" in Jerusalem. Under her guidance Collegium held more than a thousand concerts, not only in Croatia but also internationally.

Bibliography

- "Naši pjevački zborovi - Sveta glazba u redovničkim novicijatima" Sveta Cecilija: a sacred music magazine 39 (1), 1969, 24.
- "Naši pjevački zborovi - Glazba u redovničkim novicijatima" Sveta Cecilija 39 (2), 1969, 60.
- "Naš glazbeni život: Franjo Dugan i Oskar Sigmund", Sveta Cecilija 40 (4), 1970, 125-126.
- "In memoriam: Franjo Lučić", Sveta Cecilija 42 (1), 1972, 2.
- "Vijesti iz inozemstva: Gloria Deo - Pax hominibus Slava Bogu - mir ljudima", Sveta Cecilija 45 (1), 1975, 27.
- "Iz naših župa: Kolaudicija novih orgulja u samostanu sestara dominikanki na Korčuli; Prigodni koncert uz kolaudaciju orgulja 15. svibnja 1979. u samostanu ss. dominikanki na Korčuli", Sveta Cecilija 49 (4), 1979, 116-117.
- "Obljetnice: Oskar Sigmund", Sveta Cecilija 50 (4), 1980, 102.
- "Iz naših župa: Sretno uskrsnuće prekrasnih orgulja u Čazmi", Sveta Cecilija 53 (3), 1983, 65.
- "Iz naših župa: Čovjek koji je udario pečat vjere u srce svoga naroda", Sveta Cecilija 53 (4), 1983, 93-94.
- "Reproduktivni problemi u opusu Ivana Marka Lukačića", in: Maračić, Ljudevit: Lukačić - Zbornik radova znanstvenog skupa održanog u povodu 400. obljetnice rođenja Ivana Marka Lukačića (1585-1985), Provincijalat franjevaca konventualaca: Zagreb, 1987.
- "Štovanje Bogorodice pomoću ansambla Collegium pro musica sacra", Sveta Cecilija 63 (1-2), 1993, 209-218.
