= Aloïse de Carlowitz =

French author and translator (1797–1863)

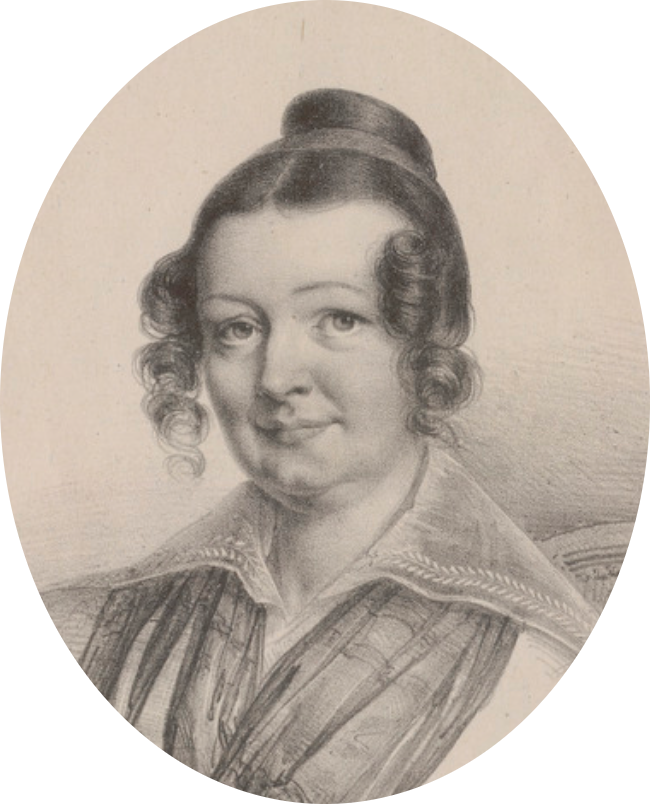
- Born: 1797; Rijeka
- Died: 1863 (aged 65–66); Gallardon
- Occupations: writer, translator

Aloïse de Carlowitz (1797 – 1863) was a French writer and translator known for her writings on divorce in France during its illegitimacy. She translated several notable works from German into French. She was born in Croatia.

== Life ==
Carlowitz was born in Rijeka in what is now Croatia in 1797. Her parents were Baron Wenceslas-Gustave and his wife. She was their only surviving child. Her father had moved the family to Austria where he was employed by Marie-Thérèse as a Colonel of the guards. She was given a first class educations as she was her parents surrogate for the sons they had lost. She showed a gift for languages learning English, Italian and in particular French. During a childhood bout of scarlet fever she was treated by Franz Joseph Gall, a doctor who was also interested in the pseudoscience of phrenology. He said that the shape of her head showed her to be exceptional. She was widely read and her reading included that classic Aristotle, Plato and Seneca as well as Kant and Leibniz.

She moved to France where she began with difficulty to publish her work. An early work in 1823 was on philosophy and it was titled, The Absolution, or John the Parricide.

In the 1830s in France there was optimism that divorce may have been made legal by Louis Philippe I. de Carlowitz's novel Le Pair de France ou Le Divorce was published in 1835. Divorce in France had been briefly permitted in about 1815 but it was then remade illegal and despite the optimism and de Carlowitz's novel it remained so.

Carlowitz died in Gallardon in 1863.

== Works ==
=== Studies, essays and works ===
- Le Danube, les Hongrois et les Slaves: voyage pictoresque et historique en six parties, Paris, impr. by Firmin-Didot, 1850–1851.
- La femme du progrès, ou l'Emancipation , Paris, Desforges, 1838.
- Le Pair de France, ou le Divorce , Paris, 1835.

=== German translations ===
- Schobri, chef de brigands, d'après les mémoires hongrois de son compatriot Ladislas Holics-Szekhely, Paris et Leipzig, Desforges, 1839.
- Correspondance between Goethe and Schiller, 1863.
- Herder, Histoire de la poésie des Hébreux, 1844.
- Schiller, Histoire de la guerre de trente ans, 1841.
- Klopstock, La Messiade, par Klopstock, 1853.
- Goethe, Wilhelm Meister, 1843.
- Goethe, Les Affinités électives, 1844.

=== Narrative ===
- Caroline, ou le Confesseur , 1833.
- La Famille de Tavora
