= Lana Obad =

- Born: Lana Obad; 20 May 1988 (age 38); Zagreb, Croatia
- Height: 5 ft 8 in (1.73 m)
- Beauty pageant titleholder
- Title: Miss Universe Croatia 2010
- Major competitions: Miss Universe Croatia 2010 (Winner); Miss Universe 2010 (Unplaced)

Lana Obad (born 20 May 1988) is a Croatian beauty pageant titleholder who was crowned Miss Universe Croatia 2010 and represented her country at Miss Universe 2010 pageant.

She studied at the Faculty of Economics and Business at University of Zagreb. Lana Obad stands 173 cm and represented her country at the Miss Universe 2010 pageant on 23 August 2010 in Las Vegas, Nevada.

Awards and achievements
Preceded by Sarah Ćosić	Miss Universe Croatia; 2010	Succeeded by Natalija Prica
