= Sonja Tomić =

Croatian writer, translator, illustrator, theologian and germanist

Sonja Tomić (born 29 May 1947) is a contemporary Croatian writer, translator, illustrator, croatist, Germanist and radio presenter. She has been noted for her works in children's literature and travelogues. She won the 2011 Literary Kranjčić.

== Education ==
Born in Dubrovnik in 1947, she graduated in theology (Faculty of Theology), mathematics (at the Faculty of Science), germanistics and Croatian language and literature at the Faculty of Philosophy, University of Zagreb. She lectured Croatian language for foreigners and both mathematics and physics at the monastic gymnasium Marianum, as well as German at the XVIII gymnasium in Zagreb and at the Catholic Faculty of Theology of the University of Zagreb.

== Work ==
She is a member of the Croatian Writers' Association. She writes for Kolo, Glas Koncila, Kana, Veritas, as well for children magazines Smib, Zvrk and Mak. She is an editor of children radio emissions at the Croatian Radio, Croatian Catholic Radio of the Croatian Catholic Radio and Radio Maria. Her literary works were translated in Slovak, Swedish, German, English, French and Italian, partially by her. Her husband Stjepan is also writer and co-author of two works. She collaborated with Stjepan Lice, Bonaventura Duda, Ivanka Brađašević and other noted Croatian Catholic writers and intellectuals.

Her children's literature corresponds with biblical-inspired literature of Selma Lagerlöf.
