= Ivanka Brađašević =

Croatian poet, writer and librarian (born 1955)

- Born: 1955 (age 70–71)
- Occupations: Librarian; poet
- Writing career
- Genre: Poetry

Ivanka Brađašević is a contemporary Croatian poet, writer and librarian.

Brađašević was born in 1955 in Nova Kapela near Slavonski Brod. She graduated Croatian language, Croatian literature and librarianship at the Faculty of Philosophy in Zagreb. She worked as a professor and librarian both in Labin and Zagreb. She collaborated with Stjepan Lice, Sonja Tomić, Željka Horvat-Vukelja and other prominent Croatian writers of Catholic orientation.

Her works were published in Zagorski list, Zvonik, Križ života, Kapelanija MUP-a, as well as by the Press agency of the Episcopal Conference of Bosnia and Herzegovina, "Katolici na internetu" and many other Catholic media. Brađašević was awarded several times by the Ministry of Tourism and Brod-Posavina County for her work. She contributed to both the Sida Košutić Days, literary manifestation in Radoboj and Poetry meetings of Stjepan Kranjčić in Križevci.
