= Smiljana Rendić =

Croatian woman journalist, translator, vaticanist, judaist scholar, poet

- Born: 27 August 1926; Split, Croatia
- Died: 26 May 1994 (aged 67); Trsat, Rijeka, Croatia
- Occupations: Journalist, translator, vaticanist, judaist scholar, poet
- Notable work: The genitive exit (1971)

Smiljana Rendić (27 August 1926 – 26 May 1994) was a Croatian woman journalist, translator, vaticanist, judaist scholar, poet, notable for her reporting from Second Vatican Council and for her censorship by ruling Communist authorities of Yugoslavia due to her Catholicism and Croatian nationality.

== Biography ==
Rendić was born in Split, Croatia in 1926, in the family of Marko and Ivana (née Ruzinović) Rendić, where she attended the gymnasium. Her family's property was confiscated by the Communist authorities due to her father's activity in Croatian Peasants' Party. Hence she was unable to finish her higher education, she was firstly employed in Jugovinil factory. Later she moved to Rijeka, where thanks to her knowledge of Italian Rendić started working in the editorial committee of La Voce del Popolo newspaper. She also wrote for Pomorstvo ('Seamanship') magazine until 1972, as well as reported for Glas Koncila and other Catholic periodicals under the guise of her pseudonyms Vjera Marini and Madam Berith. Rendić also published her poems (mostly sonnets) in various periodicals.

Rendić was sued by the Communist authorities for her article The genitive exit or the Second Croatian revival in Kritika magazine (no. 18) in 1971, in which she criticized Yugoslav integralism and "linguistic colonisation" of Croatian language (as partially stated in Declaration on the Name and Status of the Croatian Literary Language) and endorsed intellectual and academical requests of Croatian Spring. Rendić's advocate was Milan Vuković, who will later become president of the Supreme Court of Croatia. As a result of the show trial at the Supreme Court of SFRY in November 1973, Rendić was forcibly retired and sentenced to one-year prison punishment, while Kritika magazine was censored.

She was a member of the editorial committee of the Glas Koncila 1963–1994. For hers biblistic, judaistic and journalist work, she was awarded by Croatian Bishops' Conference's unique award Zlatno pero ('Golden feather') in 1988. Besides her, it wasn't awarded to anybody else.

Rendić died in May 1994 in her apartment in Trsat.

== Works ==
- Crni šator (Black tent), Glas Koncila, 1967.
- Crkva u getu (The Church in a ghetto), 1969. (manuscript)
- Katolički identitet i hrvatski preporod (Catholic identity and the Croatian national revival: Discussions, Criticism, Reports), Glas Koncila, Zagreb, 2012, ISBN 978-953-241-368-7.

== Legacy ==
The Smiljana Rendić Collection of the Archdiocesan Archives in Zagreb contains Rendić's documents, books, newspapers, articles and press clippings. Founded in 1930 in Split, it was enlarged by donations of Glas Koncila in 1994 and acquisition by the Archives in 2005.
