= Glas Koncila =

- Front page of a 2005 issue
- Type: Weekly newspaper
- Format: Compact
- Owner: Archdiocesan Cathedra in Zagreb
- Editor: Branimir Stanić
- Founded: October 4, 1962
- Language: Croatian
- Headquarters: Zagreb, Croatia
- ISSN: 0436-0311
- Website: www.glas-koncila.hr

Glas Koncila ("Voice of the Council") is a Croatian, Roman Catholic, weekly newspaper published in Zagreb and distributed throughout the country, as well as among Croats of Bosnia and Herzegovina and Croatian diaspora. It is also a publishing house.

== Publishing history ==
The newspaper (whose title means "Voice of the Council") began publication on October 4, 1962, by the name Glas s Koncila, at the initiative of the Zagreb Franciscans and based upon a decision made by the archbishop of Zagreb, Franjo Šeper, as a mimeographed bulletin which reported on the events of the Second Vatican Council. First editor was Franciscan Zorislav Lajoš. In 1963, the Franciscans handed over the publication of the newspaper to the Archdiocesan Cathedra in Zagreb. The newspaper began to be published as a semi-monthly under the name Glas Koncila (printed in the Informator printing house in Zagreb), and Vladimir Pavlinić was appointed editor. During the 1970s newspaper had a circulation of circa 140 000 copies weekly. Newspaper played decisive role in theological discuss following confrontations of various post-Council theological trends.

It was first printed on September 29, 1963, with the motto "The New Face of the Church". The 1963 Christmas edition was printed in 40,000 copies. The publisher was the Archdiocesan Cathedral in Zagreb and the editor-in-chief was the head of this institution. It was issued every two weeks until the end of 1984. In December 1984, the publication's editor Živko Kustić was put under investigation for disseminating "misinformation" and was sentenced to two months in jail the following month.

Since January 1985, Glas Koncila has been a weekly newspaper, published jointly by the archdioceses of Zagreb, Split, Sarajevo, Rijeka and Zadar. From 1987 to 1991, the Archdiocese of Belgrade was also one of the publishers. Since 2004, the publisher is again the Archdiocesan Cathedra in Zagreb.

== Notable contributors ==
Notable contributors include Bonaventura Duda, Celestin Tomić, Vladimir Lončarević, Sonja Tomić, Stjepan Lice, Živko Kustić, Smiljana Rendić, Eva Kirchmayer-Bilić, Tomislav Šagi-Bunić...

=== Editors-in-chief ===
- Zorislav Lajoš, OFM (1962-3)
- Vladimir Pavlinić (1963-1972)
- Živko Kustić (1972-1990)
- Ivan Miklenić (1990-2020)
- Branimir Stanić (2020- )

== Awards ==
Since 2010, Glas Koncila Prize (Nagrada Glasa Koncila) is conferred annually for the best unpublished novel that promotes Christian values in a universal sense. The winners of the award receive the right to publish the novel in Glas Koncila, as well as a money prize.
