= Vladimir Lončarević =

Croatian literary historian and theorist

Vladimir Lončarević (born 26 July 1960) is a Croatian literary historian, literary theorist, Croatist, essayist and publicist.

== Biography ==
Lončarević was born in Zagreb, where he graduated in Croatian studies from the Faculty of Humanities and Social Sciences in 1985 with thesis Historijski roman Augusta Šenoe ("Historical romans of August Šenoa"). As a student, he edited Jordan, a religious-cultural magazine. He was a redactor and lector for INA (1986-7) and Zagrebačka banka (1989-94) as well as in the religious-philosophical magazine Obnovljeni Život ("Renewed Life", 1988-9). While working for the Croatian embassy in Ljubljana (1994-6) he was also editor of the magazine Korijeni ("Roots") of the Slovenian Croats published in Ljubljana. Returning to Croatia, since 1997 he worked as a counselor in the Minister of Construction, Housing-Communal Works. He was also an auxiliary counselor in the Office of the President of the Republic since January 1999. Later, he was a university professor at the Faculty of Philosophy and Religious Studies in Zagreb (hr). His essays and literary criticisms were published in the literary revue Marulić (hr). Lončarević earned his master's degree in Croatian with a dissertation about the life and work of Ljubomir Maraković and his connections with the Croatian Catholic movement.

He was a consultant for analytics and domestic politics of the Croatian president Kolinda Grabar-Kitarović. Lončarević is a regular columnist for Glas Koncila and Vijenac.

He is member of the Croatian Writers' Association.

He was decorated with Order of the Croatian Trefoil and Order of Danica Hrvatska with the face of Marko Marulić.
