= 1948 Big Nine Conference football season =

- Sport: American football
- Teams: 9
- Top draft pick: Bob DeMoss
- Champion: Michigan
- Runners-up: Northwestern
- Season MVP: Art Murakowski

Seasons
- 1947 1949

1948 Big Nine Conference football standings
	Conf.					Overall
Team	W		L		T	W		L		T
No. 1 Michigan $	6	–	0	–	0	9	–	0	–	0
No. 7 Northwestern	5	–	1	–	0	8	–	2	–	0
No. 16 Minnesota	5	–	2	–	0	7	–	2	–	0
Ohio State	3	–	3	–	0	6	–	3	–	0
Iowa	2	–	4	–	0	4	–	5	–	0
Purdue	2	–	4	–	0	3	–	6	–	0
Indiana	2	–	4	–	0	2	–	7	–	0
Illinois	2	–	5	–	0	3	–	6	–	0
Wisconsin	1	–	5	–	0	2	–	7	–	0
$ – Conference champion; Rankings from AP Poll

The 1948 Big Nine Conference football season was the 53rd season of college football played by the member schools of the Big Nine Conference (also known as the Western Conference and the Big Ten Conference) and was a part of the 1948 college football season.

The 1948 Big Nine champion was Michigan. The Wolverines compiled a 9–0 record, shut out five of nine opponents, led the conference in both scoring offense (28.0 points per game) and scoring defense (4.9 points allowed per game), and were ranked No. 1 in the final AP Poll. The 1948 season was Michigan's second straight undefeated, untied season. The Wolverines entered the 1948 season with a 14-game winning streak dating back to October 1946 and extended the streak to 23 games. End Dick Rifenburg and tackle Alvin Wistert were consensus first-team All-Americans. Guard Dominic Tomasi was selected as the team's most valuable player.

Northwestern finished in second place with an 8–2 record and was ranked No. 7 in the final AP Poll. Under conference rules preventing the same team from returning to the Rose Bowl in consecutive seasons, Northwestern received the conference's bid to play in the 1949 Rose Bowl where the Wildcats defeated the California Golden Bears, 20–14. Northwestern fullback Art Murakowski won the Chicago Tribune Silver Football trophy as the conference's most valuable player.

Minnesota finished in third place with a 7–2 and was ranked No. 16 in the final AP Poll. Minnesota was led by Bernie Bierman in his 14th year as head coach and by tackle Leo Nomellini who was a consensus first-team All-American.

== Season overview ==
=== Results and team statistics ===
Conf. Rank	Team	Head coach	AP final	AP high	Overall record	Conf. record	PPG	PAG	MVP
1	Michigan	B. Oosterbaan	1	1	9–0	6–0	**28.0**	**4.9**	Dominic Tomasi
2	Northwestern	Robert Voigts	7	3	8–2	5–1	19.1	9.1	**Art Murakowski**
3	Minnesota	Bernie Bierman	16	8	7–2	5–2	22.6	10.4	Ev Faunce
4	Ohio State	Wes Fesler	NR	11	6–3	3–3	20.4	10.4	Joe Whisler
5 (tie)	Iowa	Eddie Anderson	NR	NR	4–5	2–4	14.1	15.8	Al DiMarco
5 (tie)	Purdue	Stuart Holcomb	NR	15	3–6	2–4	14.0	19.4	Harry Szulborski
5 (tie)	Indiana	Clyde Smith	NR	17	2–7	2–4	8.3	24.1	George Taliaferro
8	Illinois	Ray Eliot	NR	NR	3–6	2–5	15.0	15.6	Jim Valek
9	Wisconsin	Harry Stuhldreher	NR	NR	2–7	1–5	14.0	21.4	Red Wilson

Key
AP final = Team's rank in the final AP Poll of the 1948 season
AP high = Team's highest rank in the AP Poll throughout the 1948 season
PPG = Average of points scored per game
PAG = Average of points allowed per game Source: SR/College Football
MVP = Most valuable player as voted by players on each team as part of the voting process to determine the winner of the Chicago Tribune Silver Football trophy; trophy winner in bold

=== Pre-season ===
Prior to the start of the 1948 season, two of the Big Nine teams changed their head coaches:

- On February 19, 1948, Indiana's head football coach Bo McMillin resigned to become general manager and head coach of the Detroit Lions. McMillin had been Indiana's head coach for 14 years. Clyde B. Smith, who had been the head coach at the LaCrosse State Teachers College since 1938, was announced as the team's new head coach on March 16, 1948.
- On March 15, 1948, Fritz Crisler "surprised the football world" when he announced his resignation as Michigan's head football coach after leading the 1947 team to an undefeated season. Crisler, who remained as athletic director, named backfield coach Bennie Oosterbaan as the Wolverines' new head football coach.

=== Regular season ===
==== September 25 ====
On September 25, 1948, all nine conference teams opened their schedules. Seven of the teams played non-conference opponents, compiling a 6–1 record in those games.

Indiana 35, Wisconsin 7. In the only conference game of the day, Indiana defeated Wisconsin, 35–7, before a crowd of 40,000 at Camp Randall Stadium in Madison, Wisconsin. The game was the first for Clyde B. Smith as Indiana's head coach. Indiana halfback George Taliaferro scored three touchdowns and played 51 minutes.

Michigan 13, Michigan State 7. Michigan defeated Michigan State, 13–7, in East Lansing. The game was also the first to be played at Michigan State's new Macklin Stadium. Early in the opening quarter, fullback Don Peterson threw a 40-yard touchdown pass to Dick Rifenburg. Peterson kicked the extra point, and Michigan's 7–0 lead held through halftime. Michigan State tied the game in the third quarter on a disputed play in which a pass from Lynn Chandnois was caught by both Hank Minarik and Wally Teninga. The official ruled that possession went to the offensive player as a touchdown. Peterson scored the winning touchdown for Michigan on a five-yard run in the fourth quarter, but failed to convert the extra point attempt. Late in the fourth quarter, Michigan State drove the ball to Michigan's two-yard line. With time running out, Teninga intercepted a Michigan State pass. Michigan's offense was held to 106 rushing yards and 117 passing yards in the game. The Spartans, under second-year head coach Biggie Munn, finished the season ranked No. 14 in the final AP Poll.

Northwestern 19, UCLA 0. Northwestern defeated UCLA, 19–0, before a crowd of 55,156 in Los Angeles. Northwestern scored three touchdown and, on defense, held UCLA scoreless with only two first downs.

Notre Dame 28, Purdue 27. Purdue lost to Notre Dame, 28–27, before a crowd of 59,343 at Notre Dame Stadium in South Bend, Indiana. Notre Dame did not lose a game from 1946 to 1949, and Purdue's one-game loss was regarded as a strong performance.

Minnesota 20, Washington 0. Minnesota defeated Washington, 20–0, before a crowd of 40,487 at Husky Stadium in Seattle. The game was scoreless in the fourth quarter before the Golden Gophers scored 20 points. Halfback Ev Faunce ran 68 yards for the first touchdown.

Illinois 40, Kansas State 0. Illinois defeated Kansas State, 40–0, before a crowd of 29,593 at Memorial Stadium in Champaign, Illinois. The Illinois offense was led by quarterback Tom Stewart who completed nine of 13 passes for 160 yards and helped secure a touchdown with a lateral to Paul Patterson.

Ohio State 21, Missouri 7. After finishing in last place in the Big Nine during the 1947 season, Ohio State opened the 1948 season with a 21–7 victory over Missouri before a crowd of 57,042 at Ohio Stadium in Columbus, Ohio.

Iowa 14, Marquette 12. Iowa defeated Marquette, 14–12, before a crowd of 30,208 at Iowa Stadium in Iowa City. Marquette missed two extra point kicks, which was the difference in the game.

==== October 2 ====
On October 2, 1948, the Big Nine football team participated in three conference games and three non-conference games. The conference teams won all three non-conference games, extending their non-conference record to 9–1.

Northwestern 21, Purdue 0. Northwestern shut out Purdue, 21–0, before a crowd of 48,000 at Dyche Stadium in Evanston, Illinois. The victory was the second consecutive shutout for Northwestern to open the season. Northwestern intercepted five Purdue passes in the game.

Indiana 7, Iowa 0. Indiana shut out Iowa, 7–0, before a crowd of 26,000 at Memorial Stadium in Bloomington, Indiana. Indiana fullback Chick Jagade intercepted a pass and then scored the game's only touchdown on a 30-yard touchdown run in the third quarter.

Wisconsin 20, Illinois 16. Wisconsin defeated Illinois, 20–16, before a crowd of 45,000 at Camp Randall Stadium in Madison. Wisconsin halfback Clarence Self scored two touchdowns, including the game-winning touchdown with less than three minutes left to play.

Michigan 14, Oregon 0. Michigan defeated Oregon, 14–0, before a crowd of 65,800 at Michigan Stadium in Ann Arbor, Michigan. Oregon came into the game with a highly touted passing game led by quarterback Norm Van Brocklin, who was later inducted into both the College and Pro Football Halls of Fame. Michigan's defensive fullback, Dick Kempthorn, was credited with playing a major role in stopping Van Brocklin's passing game. Northwestern coach Bob Voigts said he would pick Kempthorn if he had his choice of all the players in college football. In the second quarter, Michigan drove 93 yards, culminating in a 60-yard touchdown pass (30 yards in the air) from halfback Chuck Ortmann to Dick Rifenburg, and Michigan led 7–0 at halftime. An Oregon drive into Michigan territory was stopped in the third quarter when Ortmann intercepted a Van Brocklin pass. On the next drive, Charlie Lentz threw a 42-yard pass to Pete Elliott who was downed inside the Oregon ten-yard line. Lentz then threw a short pass to Tom Peterson for the final touchdown. In the fourth quarter, Oregon drove the ball to the Michigan two-yard line, but Michigan's defense held and the ball went to Michigan on downs. The 1948 Oregon Ducks finished the season with a record of 9–1, as co-champion of the Pacific Coast Conference, and ranked No. 9 in the final AP Poll.

Minnesota 39, Nebraska 13. Minnesota defeated Nebraska, 39–13, before a crowd of 57,209 at Memorial Stadium in Minneapolis. The Golden Gophers scored on four touchdown passes and a 68-yard interception return by Dale Wagner. The Gophers also fumbled eight times.

Ohio State 20, USC 0. Ohio State defeated USC, 20–0, before a crowd of 75,102 at Ohio Stadium in Columbus, Ohio. Joe Whisler scored two touchdowns for Ohio State.

==== October 9 ====
On October 9, 1948, the Big Nine football teams participated in three conference games and three non-conference games. All three non-conference games resulted in losses, bringing the conference's non-conference record to 9–4.

Michigan 40, Purdue 0. Michigan (ranked No. 7 in the AP Poll) defeated Purdue (ranked No. 15), 40–0, in West Lafayette, Indiana. The crowd of 45,996 was the largest in the history of Ross–Ade Stadium up to that time. Michigan's offense confused Purdue with a fake T formation that disguised a single-wing formation. Michigan took a 19–0 in the first half on touchdown runs by Leo Koceski and Peterson and a 23-yard touchdown pass from Chuck Ortmann to Dick Rifenburg. The Wolverines extended their lead in the second half on a 57-yard touchdown pass from Wally Teninga to Rifenburg, a 10-yard run by Teninga, and a six-yard run by Charlie Lentz. Michigan's defense forced five turnovers (three interceptions and two fumble recoveries) and held Purdue to only 36 rushing yards and 122 passing yards in the game.

Northwestern 19, Minnesota 16. Northwestern (ranked No.3 in the AP Poll) defeated Minnesota (ranked No. 8 in the AP Poll), 19–16, before a crowd of 47,000 at Dyche Stadium in Evanston. In the first 10 minutes of the game, Northwestern fumbled three times, and Minnesota took a 16–0 lead. Northwestern rallied back on touchdowns by Aschenbrenner, Hagmann, and Worthington.

Iowa 14, Ohio State 7. Iowa defeated Ohio State, 14–7, before a crowd of 63,394 at Ohio Stadium in Columbus. The victory was the first for Iowa at Ohio Stadium since 1928. Jerry Faske returned a kickoff 65 yards in the first quarter and then scored on a 12-yard run.

California 40, Wisconsin 14. Wisconsin lost to California, 40–14, before a crowd of 66,000 at California Memorial Stadium in Berkeley, California.

Texas Christian 7, Indiana 6. Indiana lost to Texas Christian, 7–6, before a crowd of 28,000 at Memorial Stadium in Bloomington. Indiana took a 6–0 lead in the third quarter on a touchdown pass from George Taliaferro to Joe Bartkiewicz, but the Hoosiers missed the extra point kick. With less three minutes left, Lindy Berry led TCU on a touchdown drive, and Homer Ludiker kicked the extra point.

Army 26, Illinois 21. Illinois lost to Army (ranked No. 5 in the AP Poll), 26–21, before a crowd of 71,119 at Memorial Stadium in Champaign. Army took a 26–0 lead early in the third quarter. Illinois responded with 21 unanswered points, including two touchdowns in the fourth quarter, but the comeback fell short.

==== October 16 ====
On October 16, 1948, the Big Nine football teams played four conference games and one non-conference game. The non-conference game was a loss, leaving the conference with a non-conference record of 9–5.

Michigan 28, Northwestern 0. Michigan (ranked No. 4 in the AP Poll) defeated Northwestern, 28–0, before a crowd of 87,782 at Michigan Stadium in Ann Arbor. The Wolverines outgained the Wildcats 166 to 47 in rushing yards, as halfback Leo Koceski scored three touchdowns. The game remained close with Michigan leading 7–0 until late in the third quarter. Then, Michigan scored three touchdowns on seven plays. The scoring flurry began with a 45-yard punt return by Koceski to the Northwestern 22-yard line. With two seconds remaining in the third period, Teninga threw a jump pass to Koceski in the end zone to give Michigan a 14–0 lead. George Sundheim of Purdue fumbled the kickoff, and Harry Allis recovered the ball. On Michigan's second play from scrimmage, Chuck Ortmann threw a touchdown pass to Koceski. On Northwestern's first play from scrimmage after the next kickoff, Northwestern's Don Burson threw a pass that was intercepted by Irv Wisniewski at the 35-yard line. Wisniewski returned the ball to Northwestern's 13-yard line. On Michigan's second play after the interception, Koceski fumbled the ball into the end zone, but the ball was recovered by center Bob Erben to give Michigan a 28–0 lead. Michigan's defense forced four turnovers in the game, three on interceptions and one on a fumble recovery. Through the first four games, Michigan had given up only seven points, and those points came on a disputed touchdown call against Michigan State. Allison Danzig in The New York Times called Michigan the "Defensive Standout Among Nation's College Elevens" and singled out two players: "Two players, in particular, are credited with the success of the Wolverine defense. Dan Dworsky, center and fullback Dick Kempthorn would seem to be the best pair of backers-up in the inter-collegiate ranks."

Minnesota 6, Illinois 0. Minnesota (ranked No. 11 in the AP Poll) defeated Illinois, 6–0, before a crowd of 62,066 at Memorial Stadium in Minneapolis. The game remained scoreless until late in the fourth quarter when Minnesota drove 75 yards for a touchdown. James S. Malosky, who later coached the Minnesota–Duluth Bulldogs from 1958 to 1997, scored the winning touchdown for the Gophers.

Purdue 20, Iowa 13. Purdue defeated Iowa, 20–13, before a homecoming crowd of 47,000 at Iowa Stadium in Iowa City.

Ohio State 17, Indiana 0. Ohio State defeated Indiana, 17–0, before a homecoming crowd of 33,000 at Memorial Stadium in Bloomington.

Yale 17, Wisconsin 7. Wisconsin lost to Yale, 17–7, before a crowd of 45,000 at Camp Randall Stadium in Madison.

==== October 23 ====
On October 23, 1948, the Big Nine teams played three conference games and three non-conference games. The Big Nine teams won one and lost two, giving the conference a 10–7 record in non-conference games.

Michigan 27, Minnesota 14. Michigan (ranked No. 1 in the AP Poll) defeated Minnesota (ranked No. 13), 27–14, before a crowd of 65,130 at Memorial Stadium in Minneapolis. Despite being held to 22 rushing yards, Michigan gained 261 yards on forward passes. At the start of the second quarter, Gene Derricotte fumbled a punt on Michigan's 15-yard line, recovered the ball, ran backward to the two-yard line, and fumbled again. All-American Leo Nomellini recovered the ball and carried it into the end zone to give Minnesota a 7–0 lead. Michigan drove to the Minnesota one-yard line on the next drive, but Tom Peterson fumbled and Minnesota recovered the ball at the 16-yard line. Two drives later, Michigan finally converted on a seven-yard touchdown pass from Wally Teninga to Tom Peterson. Less than 90 seconds after Peterson's tying touchdown, Michigan took the lead when Ed McNeill blocked a Minnesota punt, and Quentin Sickels recovered the ball at the one-yard line. Peterson ran it in for his second touchdown. Minnesota drove to Michigan's one-yard line at the end of the second quarter, but the clock expired and Michigan led 13–7 at halftime. Minnesota took a 14–13 lead in the third quarter on a 69-yard drive capped by a touchdown run by Ev Faunce. On the next possession, Michigan drove 77 yards and took a 20–14 lead on a 37-yard touchdown pass to Dick Rifenburg. Rifenburg fumbled the ball at the five-yard line, but recovered his own fumble and continued into the end zone. In the fourth quarter, Wally Teninga intercepted a Bill Elliott pass on Michigan's 11-yard line and returned the ball 26 yards. Chuck Ortman connected with Leo Koceski on a jump pass that covered 62 yards (the last 50 by Koceski after the reception) to give Michigan its fourth touchdown.

Northwestern 48, Syracuse 0. Northwestern (ranked No. 10 in the AP Poll) defeated Syracuse, 48–0, before a crowd of 35,000 at Dyche Stadium in Evanston, Illinois. Syracuse's star, Bernie Custis, was injured in the first quarter and was unable to play for the remainder of the game. Art Murakowski scored two touchdowns.

Ohio State 34, Wisconsin 32. Ohio State defeated Wisconsin, 34–32, before a crowd of 77,205 at Ohio Stadium in Columbus. Ohio State rallied from behind twice, including deficits of 19-7 and 33–20, in a game that The Cincinnati Enquirer called "one of the most scintillating, hair-raising games ever staged in Buckeye Stadium". Each team scored five touchdowns, but Wisconsin was able to convert only two kicks for extra point. Wisconsin's line prevented Ohio State from advancing the ball on the ground, and the Buckeyes opened up a passing attack, led by Pandel Savic, that accounted for 211 yards and all five Ohio State touchdowns.

Illinois 10, Purdue 6. Illinois defeated Purdue, 10–6, before a crowd of 56,451 at Memorial Stadium in Champaign, Illinois. Don Maechtle kicked the game-winning extra point and field goal.

Notre Dame 27, Iowa 12. Iowa lost to Notre Dame, 27–12, before a crowd of 53,000 in Iowa City.

Pittsburgh 21, Indiana 14. Pittsburgh defeated Indiana, 21–14, before a crowd of 17,118 in Pittsburgh. Halfback Louis "Bimbo" Cecconi threw a 63-yard touchdown pass to Jimmy Joe Robinson with less than two minutes left in the game to deliver the win to Pittsburgh.

==== October 30 ====
On October 30, 1948, the Big Nine football teams played four conference games and one non-conference games. The non-conference game ended in a victory, giving the conference an 11–7 record in non-conference games.

Michigan 28, Illinois 20. Michigan (ranked No. 1 in the AP Poll) defeated Illinois, 28–20, before a homecoming crowd of 85,938 at Michigan Stadium in Ann Arbor. Michigan held on a goal-line stand in the first quarter (first-and-goal from the five-yard line), and Illinois failed to convert a field goal on fourth down. After a scoreless first quarter, Michigan went 98 yards on a drive that included a Statue of Liberty play by Leo Koceski and ended with a 15-yard bullet pass from Pete Elliott to Ed McNeill. The game was tied 7–7 at halftime. Michigan reclaimed the lead in the third quarter with 14-yard touchdown pass from Peterson to Rifenburg. Michigan extended its lead to 21–7 on a two-yard run by Wally Teninga later in the third quarter. Illinois scored its own third-quarter touchdown after Leo Koceski fumbled and Illinois recovered the ball at the Michigan 29-yard line. Early in the fourth quarter, Bernie Krueger scored on a quarterback sneak to cut Michigan's lead to 21–20. Michigan's final touchdown came on a 38-yard pass from Chuck Ortmann to Harry Allis. Michigan outgained Illinois on the ground 102 to 40, but Illinois dominated in the air with 256 passing yards to 132 for Michigan. The New York Times called the game, witnessed by a homecoming crowd of 85,938, "one of the wildest fights in Big Nine history" and added, "What a battle this was! Not for a second could one be sure of the outcome."

Northwestern 21, Ohio State 7. Northwestern (ranked No. 9 in the AP Poll) defeated Ohio State, 21–7, before a homecoming crowd of 47,000 at Dyche Stadium in Evanston, Illinois. The game was tied, 7–7 at halftime, but Northwestern pulled away with two touchdowns in the third quarter. Johnny Miller, a backup halfback, scored the winning touchdown on a 22-yard carry.

Minnesota 30, Indiana 7. Minnesota (ranked No. 15 in the AP Poll) defeated Indiana, 30–7, in Minneapolis. The game attracted a crowd of 64,926, the second largest in the history of Memorial Stadium to that point. Minnesota outgained Indiana, 308 yards to 73 yards.

Iowa 19, Wisconsin 13. After falling behind at halftime by a 13–0 score, Iowa staged a comeback and won, 19–13, in Iowa City.

Purdue 14, Marquette 9. Purdue defeated Marquette, 14–9, before a crowd of 32,000 at Ross–Ade Stadium in Lafayette, Indiana. Purdue trailed 9-7 but scored the winning touchdown in the fourth quarter. Harry Szulborski gained 171 yards on 29 carries for Purdue.

==== November 6 ====
On November 6, 1948, the Big Nine football teams played three conference games and three non-conference games. The Big Ten teams won two of the non-conference games, giving the conference a 13–8 record in non-conference games.

Michigan 35, Navy 0. Michigan (ranked No. 2 in the AP Poll) defeated Navy, 35–0, in front of a sellout crowd of 85,938 at Michigan Stadium. Michigan scored in the first quarter on a one-yard run by Chuck Ortmann. Tom Peterson extended Michigan's lead with a touchdown run in the second quarter. Michigan added two touchdowns in the third quarter on a run by Wally Teninga and an 18-yard touchdown pass from Bob Van Summern to Dick Rifenburg. The final touchdown came in the fourth quarter on a 60-yard touchdown pass from Ortmann to Rifenburg. Michigan outgained Navy on the ground 231 yards to 73 yards. Michigan's defense allowed only 119 yards of total offense (73 rushing yards and 46 passing yards), recovered three Navy fumbles and intercepted two passes, one by Dick Kempthorn and the other by Dan Dworsky. With the game in hand, Oosterbaan played the reserves, reportedly placing 44 players into the game.

Northwestern 16, Wisconsin 7. Northwestern (ranked No. 10 in the AP Poll) defeated Wisconsin, 16–7, before a homecoming crowd of 45,000 at Camp Randall Stadium in Madison, Wisconsin. Northwestern led 2–0 at halftime, as the only points of the half came on a safety. Northwestern then added two touchdowns in the third quarter.

Minnesota 34, Purdue 7. Minnesota (ranked No. 19 in the AP Poll) defeated Purdue, 34–7, in 45 degree weather in Minneapolis. The game drew a crowd of 66,953, the largest ever at Memorial Stadium up to that time.

Illinois 14, Iowa 0. Illinois shut out Iowa, 14–0, before a crowd of 41,502 at Memorial Stadium in Champaign, Illinois. Mumey Lazier returned a punt 56 yards for a touchdown in the second quarter.

Ohio State 41, Pittsburgh 0. Ohio State shut out Pittsburgh, 41–0, before a crowd of 68,966 at Ohio Stadium in Columbus.

Notre Dame 42, Indiana 6. Indiana lost to Notre Dame, 42–6, at Memorial Stadium in Bloomington, Indiana.

==== November 13 ====
On November 13, 1948, the Big Nine schools played three conference games and three non-conference games. The Big Ten teams lost two of the non-conference games, giving the conference a 14–10 record in non-conference games.

Michigan 54, Indiana 0. Michigan (ranked No. 1 in the AP Poll) defeated Indiana, 54–0, at Michigan Stadium in Ann Arbor. Michigan gained 435 yards of total offense, and held Indiana to 159 yards. In its account of the game, the 1949 Michiganensian quipped, "Every man on the Michigan bench got into the ball game, and some spectators claimed that it was Hank Hatch, the equipment manager, who tallied the last Wolverine touchdown."

Notre Dame 12, Northwestern 7. Northwestern (ranked No. 8 in the AP Poll) lost to Notre Dame (ranked No. 2 in the AP Poll), 12–7, before a crowd of 59,305 at Notre Dame Stadium in South Bend. Northeastern led, 7–6, six minutes into the fourth quarter, but Notre Dame rallied to extend its winning streak to 20 games.

Minnesota 28, Iowa 21. In the annual battle for the Floyd of Rosedale trophy, Minnesota (ranked No. 14 in the AP Poll) defeated Iowa, 28–21, before a crowd of 44,000 at Iowa Stadium in Iowa City.

Ohio State 34, Illinois 7. Ohio State defeated Illinois, 34–7, before a homecoming crowd of 65,732 at Memorial Stadium in Champaign, Illinois. Ohio State gained 449 yards to 120 yards for Illinois.

Wisconsin 26, Marquette 0. Wisconsin shut out Marquette, 26–0, before a crowd of 43,000 at Camp Randall Stadium in Madison, Wisconsin. Wally Dreyer was the star for Wisconsin.

Pittsburgh 20, Purdue 13. Purdue lost to Pittsburgh, 20–13, before a crowd of 30,000 at Ross–Ade Stadium in West Lafayette. Pittsburgh halfback Jimmy Joe Robinson returned a kickoff 100 yards.

==== November 20 ====
In the final week of the season, the Big Nine football teams played four conference games and one non-conference game. The conference game resulted in a victory, leaving the Big Nine with a 15–10 record in non-conference games.

Michigan 13, Ohio State 3. In the annual Michigan–Ohio State football rivalry game, Michigan (ranked No. 1 in the AP Poll) defeated Ohio State, 13–3, at Ohio Stadium in Columbus. The game was played in front of a crowd of 82,754 spectators – the second largest crowd in Ohio Stadium history up to that time. Although Michigan was favored by 14 points, Ohio State dominated the line of scrimmage in the first half, allowing only three first downs by Michigan, one of which came on a penalty. Ohio State took a 3–0 lead in the first quarter on a 26-yard field goal by Jim Hague. The kick followed a fumble recovery by Jack Lininger after an errant lateral by Chuck Ortmann. Michigan took the lead in the second quarter on a 92-yard drive culminating with a 44-yard touchdown pass from Ortmann to Harry Allis. In the fourth quarter, Michigan drove 62 yards for a second touchdown led by the passing of Wally Teninga and Pete Elliott. The touchdown was scored by fullback Tom Peterson. Allis converted the first extra point, but missed on the second. Ohio State outgained Michigan on the ground 130 yards to 54, but Michigan outgained Ohio State in the air 116 yards to 73.

Northwestern 20, Illinois 7. In the annual Illinois–Northwestern football rivalry game, Northwestern (ranked No. 7 in the AP Poll) defeated Illinois, 20–7, before a crowd of 48,000 at Dyche Stadium in Evanston. With the victory, Northwestern clinched a berth in the 1949 Rose Bowl. After the game, Northwestern's players lifted their coach Bob Voigts to their shoulders and carried him from the field.

Minnesota 16, Wisconsin 0. In the annual Minnesota–Wisconsin football rivalry game, Minnesota (ranked No. 15 in the AP Poll) defeated Wisconsin, 16–0, before a crowd of 45,000 at Camp Randall Stadium in Madison. Minnesota exceeded Wisconsin in total yards by a tally of 425 to 88. The Golden Gophers concluded their season with only two losses, against No. 1 Michigan and No. 7 Northwestern.

Purdue 39, Indiana 0. In the annual Old Oaken Bucket rivalry game, Purdue defeated Indiana, 39–0, in West Lafayette. The 39-point margin of victory was the largest in the history of the rivalry.

Iowa 34, Boston University 14. Iowa defeated the Boston University Terriers, 34–14, on a muddy field at Fenway Park in Boston. Boston University led 14–7 at halftime, but the Hawkeyes scored 27 unanswered points in the second half led by the passing combination of Al DiMarco to Jack Dittmer.

=== Post-season ===
On December 11, 1948, four days before a student referendum on whether he should keep his job, and in the face of "Goodbye Harry" signs, Harry Stuhldreher resigned as Wisconsin's head football coach, though he retained his job as athletic director.

=== 1949 Rose Bowl ===
Under Big Nine Conference rules, the conference champion played in the Rose Bowl, except that there was a further rule providing that the same team could not participate in the Rose Bowl two years in a row. Accordingly, Northwestern, which finished in second place, received the Big Nine's bid to play in the Rose Bowl.

In the 1949 Rose Bowl, Northwestern faced an undefeated 1948 California Golden Bears football team that was ranked No. 4 in the final AP Poll. Northwestern upset California, 20 to 14. The Wildcats opened the scoring in the first quarter with a 73-yard touchdown run by Frank Aschenbrenner, the longest gain from scrimmage in Rose Bowl history up to that time. California then tied the score on a 67-yard run by Jackie Jensen. Art Murakowski scored Northwestern's second touchdown (extra point missed) to give Northwestern a 13 to 7 lead at halftime. California took a 14 to 13 lead in the third quarter. In the fourth quarter, Northwestern halfback Ed Tunnicliff took a direct snap from center and ran 42 yards for the winning touchdown.

== All-conference players ==
In 1948, All-Big Nine football teams were selected by the Associated Press (AP), United Press (UP), and International News Service (INS). The following players were selected to the first team by at least one of those selectors:

Position	Name	Team	Selectors
End	Dick Rifenburg	Michigan	AP, INS, UP
End	Bud Grant	Minnesota	AP, INS, UP
Tackle	Alvin Wistert	Michigan	AP, INS, UP
Tackle	Bill Kay	Iowa	AP, UP
Tackle	Phil O'Reilly	Purdue	INS
Guard	Dominic Tomasi	Michigan	AP, INS, UP
Guard	Leo Nomellini	Minnesota	AP, INS, UP
Center	Alex Sarkisian	Northwestern	AP, INS, UP
Quarterback	Pete Elliott	Michigan	AP, INS, UP
Halfback	Harry Szulborski	Purdue	AP, INS, UP
Halfback	George Taliaferro	Indiana	AP, INS, UP
Fullback	Art Murakowski	Northwestern	AP, INS, UP

== All-Americans ==
Three Big Nine players were recognized as consensus first-team players on the 1948 College Football All-America Team. They are:

Position	Name	Team	Selectors
End	Dick Rifenberg	Michigan	AP, FWAA, INS, NEA, TSN, UP, CP, Look, NYS, WCFF
Tackle	Leo Nomellini	Minnesota	AFCA, AP, FWAA, INS, NEA, TSN, UP, CP, Look, CT, NYS, WCFF
Tackle	Al Wistert	Michigan	AFCA, UP, CP, TSN, CT, WCFF

Other Big Nine players receiving first-team honors from at least one selector were:

Position	Name	Team	Selectors
Center	Alex Sarkisian	Northwestern	INS, NYS
Back	Art Murakowski	Northwestern	AP
Back	Pete Elliott	Michigan	INS
Back	George Taliaferro	Indiana	INS

== 1949 NFL draft ==
The following Big Nine players were selected among the first 100 picks in the 1949 NFL draft:

Name	Position	Team	Round	Overall pick
Bob DeMoss	Back	Purdue	2	13
Dan Dworsky	Center	Michigan	2	15
Bill Kay	Tackle	Iowa	4	35
Bill Bendrick	Back	Wisconsin	4	39
John Goldsberry	Tackle	Indiana	4	40
Abe Gibron	Guard	Purdue	6	55
Jerry Krall	Back	Ohio State	6	59
Ev Faunce	Back	Minnesota	9	83
Joe Soboleski	Guard	Michigan	9	86
Ed McNeil	End	Michigan	9	88
George Buksar	Back	Purdue	10	94
