= 1949 Rose Bowl =

American college football game

- 35th Rose Bowl Game
| Northwestern Wildcats | California Golden Bears |
| (7–2) | (10–0) |
| Big Nine | Pacific Coast |
| 20 | 14 |
| Head coach: Bob Voigts | Head coach: Pappy Waldorf |
| AP 7 | AP 4 |
| | 1 | 2 | 3 | 4 | Total |
|---|---|---|---|---|---|
| Northwestern | 7 | 6 | 0 | 7 | 20 |
| California | 7 | 0 | 7 | 0 | 14 |
- Date: January 1, 1949
- Season: 1948
- Stadium: Rose Bowl
- Location: Pasadena, California
- MVP: Frank Aschenbrenner (Northwestern HB)
- Favorite: Northwestern by 6½ points
- Referee: James M. Cain (Pacific Coast; split crew: Pacific Coast, Big Nine)
- Attendance: 93,000

The 1949 Rose Bowl was the 35th edition of the college football bowl game, played at the Rose Bowl in Pasadena, California, on Saturday, January 1. The seventh-ranked Northwestern Wildcats of the Big Nine Conference defeated the #4 California Golden Bears, champions of the Pacific Coast Conference, 20–14.

Northwestern halfback Frank Aschenbrenner was named the Player of the Game when the award was created in 1953 and selections were made retroactively.

It was the third Rose Bowl since the Big Nine and PCC made an exclusive agreement to match their conference champions; the Big Nine team won for the third straight year.

Northwestern has played in just one Rose Bowl since, 47 years later in January 1996. Until the 2013 Gator Bowl, this was the program's only bowl game win.

== Teams ==
=== Northwestern Wildcats ===
Northwestern had finished 8–2 in the Big 9 Conference, losing only to perennial powerhouses Michigan (0–28) and Notre Dame (7–12). Northwestern blanked UCLA 19–0, Purdue 21–0, and Syracuse 48–0. Northwestern rallied from three turnovers and a 16-point deficit to defeat Minnesota 19–16 as well as defeating Ohio State 21–7, Wisconsin 16–7, and Illinois 20–7. The Big Nine's "no repeat" rule prevented two-time champion Michigan from making a consecutive trip to the Rose Bowl, so second-place Northwestern received the invitation to the game.

=== California Golden Bears ===
California had a perfect record going into the game and had averaged 28 points per game over the course of the season. Although neither team had faced each other before, Coach Waldorf had previously been the Wildcats coach from 1935 to 1946 before leaving for the Golden Bears. Northwestern head coach Bob Voigts was only 33-years-old and had been named an All-American in 1938 playing for Waldorf.

California and Oregon both had perfect records in the Pacific Coast Conference. California was undefeated overall, and Oregon's only loss was at undefeated Michigan, that year's national champions, and the Ducks had seven victories in the PCC to Cal's six. Oregon, led by quarterback Norm Van Brocklin and halfback John McKay, opted for a playoff game, but California declined. The tiebreaker format the PCC elected to use was that the championship team be elected by the schools. The PCC had ten members in 1948, six in the Northwest and four in California, so it was assumed that Oregon would be the team playing in the Rose Bowl, as even a 5–5 tie vote would be in their favor. Instead California was voted champion of the PCC, because the University of Washington had persuaded the University of Montana, then a member of the PCC, to vote for California, something that has not been forgotten by Oregon fans. (The PCC allowed a second bowl team that season and Oregon went to the Cotton Bowl, but lost 21–13 to hometown SMU in Dallas.)

== Game summary ==
Frank Aschenbrenner ran 73 yards, the longest touchdown run in Rose Bowl history. In the second quarter, the Wildcats were awarded a touchdown in a controversial call when Art Murakowski fumbled the ball entering the endzone, but missed the point-after. Although Jensen is injured early in the third quarter, Cal mounted a 56-yard drive for a touchdown and point-after giving them a one-point lead.

In the fourth quarter, with less than three minutes and 88 yards to go, the Wildcats launched a historic drive: Aschenbrenner made the only complete pass of the game to Stonesifer for 18 yards, followed by a 14-yard run by Perricone, a 5-yard penalty against Cal, and then a Statue of Liberty play and 45-yard run by Ed Tunnicliff for a touchdown. The Bears attempted a passing drive in the last minute, but PeeWee Day intercepted a pass to end Cal's hopes of a title.

Both Aschenbrenner's and Jensen's runs were from scrimmage. The final touchdown was a direct snap from center to a running back (Tunnicliff) from a T-formation set.
