= 1948 Michigan Wolverines football team =

American college football season

1948 Michigan Wolverines football

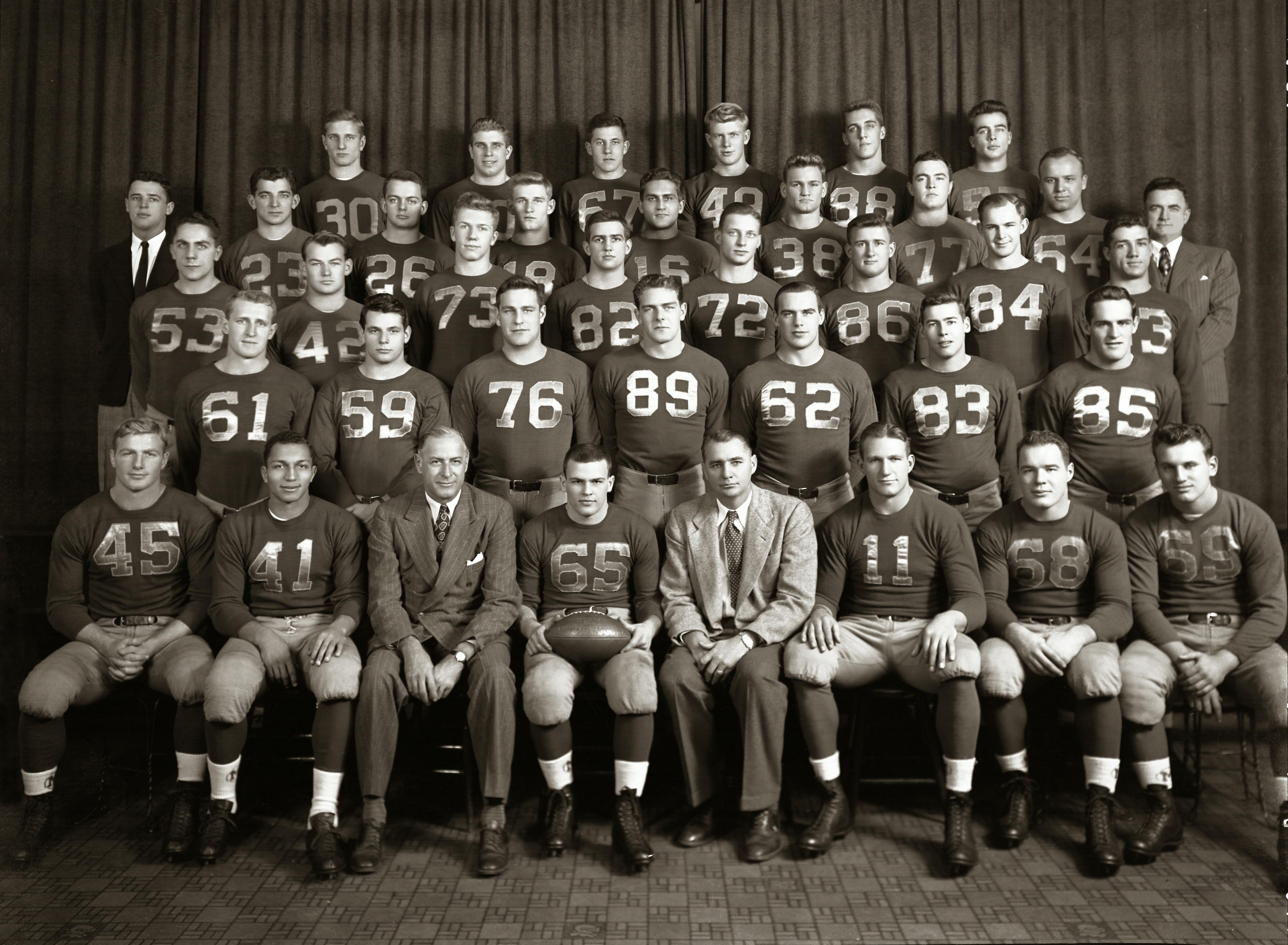

AP Poll national champion Big Nine champion
- Conference: Big Nine Conference

Ranking
- AP: No. 1
- Record: 9–0 (6–0 Big Nine)
- Head coach: Bennie Oosterbaan (1st season)
- MVP: Dominic Tomasi
- Captain: Bruce Hilkene
- Home stadium: Michigan Stadium

1948 Big Nine Conference football standings
	Conf.					Overall
Team	W		L		T	W		L		T
No. 1 Michigan $	6	–	0	–	0	9	–	0	–	0
No. 7 Northwestern	5	–	1	–	0	8	–	2	–	0
No. 16 Minnesota	5	–	2	–	0	7	–	2	–	0
Ohio State	3	–	3	–	0	6	–	3	–	0
Iowa	2	–	4	–	0	4	–	5	–	0
Purdue	2	–	4	–	0	3	–	6	–	0
Indiana	2	–	4	–	0	2	–	7	–	0
Illinois	2	–	5	–	0	3	–	6	–	0
Wisconsin	1	–	5	–	0	2	–	7	–	0
$ – Conference champion; Rankings from AP Poll

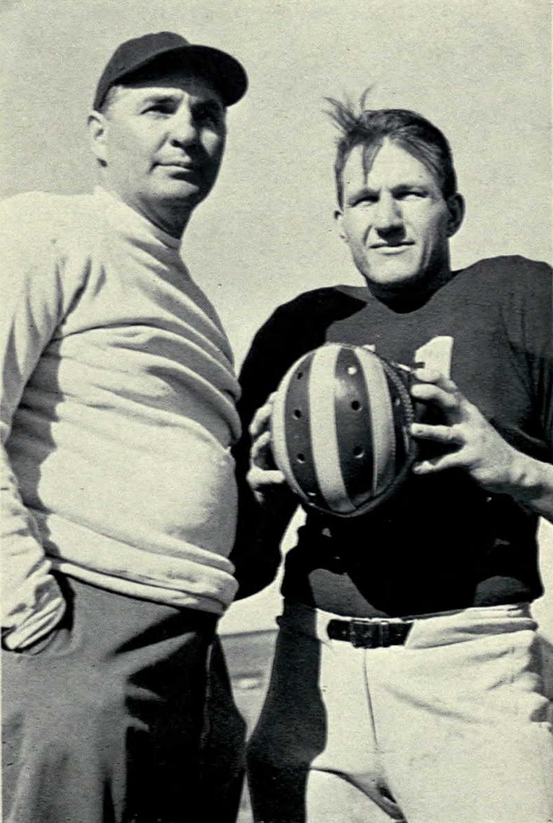
Coach Oosterbaan and All-American Al Wistert

The 1948 Michigan Wolverines football team represented the University of Michigan during the 1948 Big Nine Conference football season. In its first year under head coach Bennie Oosterbaan, Michigan compiled a 9–0 record, defeated six ranked opponents by a combined score of 122–17, won the Big Nine Conference and repeated as national champions. In the final AP Poll, Michigan received 192 first place votes, twice as many as second-place Notre Dame which garnered 97 first place votes. This remained the last national title won by the Wolverines until 1997, and was the last consensus national title won by the Wolverines overall until 2023.

The 1948 season was Michigan's second straight undefeated, untied season. After Fritz Crisler led the 1947 team to a perfect 10–0 record, the Wolverines entered the 1948 season with a 14-game winning streak dating back to October 1946. Despite the loss of all four backfield starters from the 1947 team (including Big Nine MVP Bump Elliott and Heisman Trophy runner-up Bob Chappuis), the 1948 team extended the winning streak to 23 games.

On offense, Michigan was led by a new backfield that included All-American quarterback Pete Elliott and halfbacks Chuck Ortmann and Leo Koceski. The team scored 252 points, an average of 28 points per game. With Ortmann as the principal passer, the Wolverines relied on an air attack, gaining more yards in the air (1,355) than on the ground (1,262). Dick Rifenburg, the team's leading receiver, was picked as a first-team All-American at the end position. Team captain Dominic Tomasi was selected as the team's Most Valuable Player. The 1949 Michiganensian wrote of the 250-pound guard, "Famous for his sharp shattering blocking, Dom tore huge gaps in the opposing lines to pave the way for Michigan's steam roller offense."

On defense, the Wolverines allowed only 44 points, an average of 4.8 points per game. The defense was led by tackles Alvin Wistert and Al Wahl, center Dan Dworsky, and fullback Dick Kempthorn. Michigan gave up 935 passing yards and 851 rushing yards. The team shut out Oregon despite the passing game of College and Pro Football Hall of Fame quarterback Norm Van Brocklin. It also held ranked Purdue and Northwestern teams to 36 and 47 rushing yards, respectively. The defense forced a total of 32 turnovers (including 21 interceptions), an average of three-and-a-half turnovers per game.

As of 2026, the 1947–48 Michigan Wolverines remain the last Big Ten team to repeat as national champions.

== Schedule ==
Date	Opponent	Rank	Site	Result	Attendance
September 25	at Michigan State*		Macklin Stadium; East Lansing, MI (rivalry)	W 13–7	51,526
October 2	Oregon*		Michigan Stadium; Ann Arbor, MI	W 14–0	66,642
October 9	at No. 15 Purdue	No. 7	Ross–Ade Stadium; West Lafayette, IN	W 40–0	47,152
October 16	No. 3 Northwestern	No. 4	Michigan Stadium; Ann Arbor, MI (rivalry)	W 28–0	87,782
October 23	at No. 13 Minnesota	No. 1	Memorial Stadium; Minneapolis, MN (Little Brown Jug)	W 27–14	64,076
October 30	Illinois^{†}	No. 1	Michigan Stadium; Ann Arbor, MI (rivalry)	W 28–20	85,872
November 6	Navy*	No. 2	Michigan Stadium; Ann Arbor, MI	W 35–0	85,808
November 13	Indiana	No. 1	Michigan Stadium; Ann Arbor, MI	W 54–0	84,043
November 20	at No. 18 Ohio State	No. 1	Ohio Stadium; Columbus, OH (rivalry)	W 13–3	78,603
*Non-conference game; ^{†}Homecoming; Rankings from AP Poll released prior to the game

== Rankings ==
Ranking movements Legend: ██ Increase in ranking ██ Decrease in ranking ( ) = First-place votes
	Week								
Poll	1	2	3	4	5	6	7	8	Final
AP	7 (2)	4 (24)	1 (74)	1 (117)	2 (68)	1 (77)	1 (130)	1 (105)	1 (192)

== Season summary ==
=== Pre-season ===
The 1947 Michigan team finished undefeated and untied with a 10–0 record, splitting the national championship with Notre Dame. In March 1948, Fritz Crisler, who had been the Wolverine's head football coach since 1938, resigned as head coach but stayed on as athletic director. Crisler selected his backfield coach, Bennie Oosterbaan, as the new head coach. Oosterbaan had been affiliated with the Michigan football program for 24 years, as an All-American end from 1925 to 1927 and as an assistant football coach from 1928 to 1947. When the selection of Oosterbaan was announced, Crisler told the press, "Bennie has the best offense mind in football. He is the ablest assistant that I have ever had." Others questioned the choice, noting that Oosterbaan had compiled only a middling 81–72 record as Michigan's basketball coach from 1938 to 1946.

Michigan entered the 1948 season with a 14-game winning streak dating back to October 29, 1946. Despite the winning streak, Michigan entered the 1948 season expected by many to finish third in the Big Nine behind Minnesota and Purdue. In addition to the coaching change, the team lost a number of key players from the 1947 team, including all four backfield starters. Bob Chappuis, who was the runner-up in voting for the 1947 Heisman Trophy, and Bump Elliott, who won the 1947 Big Nine MVP Trophy, were both gone, as were fullback Jack Weisenburger (the 1948 Big Nine rushing leader) and quarterback Howard Yerges. The 1948 team also lost its top two scorers (Chappuis and kicker Jim Brieske), two starting tackles (Bruce Hilkene and Bill Pritula), starting center (J. T. White), and two ends (Len Ford and Bob Mann) who went on to have successful careers in the NFL.

The Wolverines suffered another setback when Gene Derricotte sustained an injury that limited his playing time. The Sporting News had picked Derricotte to be one of the Big Nine's two most valuable players in a pre-season feature story, calling him Michigan's best broken field runner since Tom Harmon. Derricotte began the season as Michigan's starting left halfback, but was injured in the first game against Michigan State. The new starting backfield in 1948 consisted of quarterback Pete Elliott, left halfback Chuck Ortmann, fullback Tom Peterson, and right halfbacks Leo Koceski and Wally Teninga.

=== Week 1: at Michigan State ===
Week 1: Michigan at Michigan State

Team	1	2	3	4	Total
• Michigan	7	0	0	6	13
Michigan St.	0	0	7	0	7

- Date: September 25, 1948
- Location: Macklin Stadium
  East Lansing, Michigan
- Game attendance: 51,526
- Referee: George W. Rennix

Michigan opened the Oosterbaan era with a 13–7 victory over Michigan State College in East Lansing. The game was also the first to be played at Michigan State's new Macklin Stadium. Early in the opening quarter, fullback Tom Peterson threw a 40-yard touchdown pass to Dick Rifenburg. Peterson kicked the extra point, and Michigan's 7–0 lead held through halftime. Michigan State tied the game in the third quarter on a disputed play in which a pass from Lynn Chandnois was caught by both Hank Minarik and Wally Teninga. The official ruled that possession went to the offensive player as a touchdown. Peterson scored the winning touchdown for Michigan on a five-yard run in the fourth quarter, but failed to convert the extra point attempt. Late in the fourth quarter, Michigan State drove the ball to Michigan's two-yard line. With time running out, Teninga intercepted a Michigan State pass. Michigan's offense was held to 106 rushing yards and 117 passing yards in the game.

A sluggish offensive performance and a narrow margin of victory over a team the Wolverines had beaten 55–0 in 1947 led some in the media to question Oosterbaan's selection as Michigan's new coach. The New York Times opined that Michigan's performance "lacked most of the precision which it had last year under H. O. Crisler." H. G. Salsinger of The Detroit News wrote:

"Michigan's first game under Oosterbaan . . . was not impressive. They lacked the spark that distinguished them through the 1947 season. The offense was dull and poorly directed. . . . The critics who had judged Oosterbaan's football coaching skills on his record as a basketball coach considered their appraisal justified. The future looked dark for Michigan and Oosterbaan."

Opinions of Oosterbaan changed as Michigan shut out ranked opponents in each of the next three games. The Spartans, under second-year head coach Biggie Munn proved to be stronger than expected, finishing the season ranked No. 14 in the final AP Poll.

Michigan's starting lineup against Michigan State was Rifenburg (left end), Atchison (left tackle), Tomasi (left guard), Dworsky (center), Heneveld (right guard), Wistert (right tackle), McNeill (right end), Elliott (quarterback), Derricotte (left halfback), Van Summern (right halfback), and Ghindia (fullback).

Oosterbaan was the last Michigan head coach to win against Michigan State in their first year until 2024, when Sherrone Moore defeated Michigan State in his first year.

=== Week 2: Oregon ===
Week 2: Oregon at Michigan

Team	1	2	3	4	Total
Oregon	0	0	0	0	0
• Michigan	0	7	7	0	14

- Date: October 2, 1948
- Location: Michigan Stadium
  Ann Arbor, Michigan
- Game attendance: 65,800
- Referee: Rollie A. Barnum

In its home opener, Michigan defeated the Oregon Ducks, 14–0. Oregon came into the game with a highly touted passing game led by quarterback Norm Van Brocklin, who was later inducted into both the College and Pro Football Halls of Fame. Michigan's defensive fullback, Dick Kempthorn, was credited with playing a major role in stopping Van Brocklin's passing game. Northwestern coach Bob Voigts said he would pick Kempthorn if he had his choice of all the players in college football. In the second quarter, Michigan drove 93 yards, culminating in a 60-yard touchdown pass (30 yards in the air) from halfback Chuck Ortmann to Dick Rifenburg. Harry Allis kicked the extra point, and Michigan led 7–0 at halftime.

An Oregon drive into Michigan territory was stopped in the third quarter when Ortmann intercepted a Van Brocklin pass. On the next drive, Charlie Lentz made his season debut for Michigan and threw a 42-yard pass to Pete Elliott who was downed inside the Oregon ten-yard line. Lentz then threw a short pass to Tom Peterson for the final touchdown, and Allis kicked the extra point. In the fourth quarter, Oregon drove the ball to the Michigan two-yard line, but Michigan's defense held and the ball went to Michigan on downs. Despite Van Brocklin's reputation, Michigan outgained Oregon 217 to 194 in passing yardage. The 1948 Oregon Ducks finished the season with a record of 9–1, as co-champion of the Pacific Coast Conference, and ranked No. 9 in the final AP Poll.

Michigan's starting lineup against Oregon was Rifenburg (left end), Soboleski (left tackle), Tomasi (left guard), Erben (center), Wilkins (right guard), Kohl (right tackle), McNeill (right end), Elliott (quarterback), Ortmann (left halfback), Koceski (right halfback), and Peterson (fullback).

=== Week 3: at Purdue ===
Week 3: Michigan at Purdue

Team	1	2	3	4	Total
• Michigan	13	6	7	14	40
Purdue	0	0	0	0	0

- Date: October 9, 1948
- Location: Ross–Ade Stadium
  West Lafayette, Indiana
- Game attendance: 45,996

In its third game, Michigan went on the road against a Purdue team that was ranked No. 15 in the AP Poll. Michigan won by a convincing score of 40–0. The game drew a crowd of 45,996, the largest in the history of Ross–Ade Stadium up to that time. Michigan's offense confused Purdue with a fake T formation that disguised a single-wing formation. Leo Koceski scored on a three-yard run to cap Michigan's opening drive. Michigan scored another first-quarter touchdown after Dan Dworsky intercepted a Bob DeMoss pass near midfield. Peterson scored on a two-yard run on a fake buck-lateral. Harry Allis converted the first extra point but missed on his second attempt. In the second quarter, Purdue drove the ball to Michigan's one-yard line, but Michigan's line, led by Wistert and Wahl, and backed up by Dworsky and Kempthorn, held and took over on downs. Michigan scored again in the second quarter on a 23-yard touchdown pass from Chuck Ortmann to Dick Rifenburg. Allis missed the extra point, and Michigan led 19–0 at halftime.

In the third quarter, Wally Teninga threw a 57-yard touchdown pass to Rifenburg to extend the lead to 26–0. Early in the fourth quarter, Dick Kempthorn intercepted a DeMoss pass on the Purdue 22-yard line, and Teninga scored on a 10-yard run. On the next drive, Bob Samsen of Purdue fumbled, and Dworsky recovered the ball at the Purdue 34-yard line. Michigan did not score on that possession, but Purdue fumbled again, this time at its own 23-yard line. Once again, Michigan failed to capitalize on the turnover. Michigan scored its final touchdown later in the fourth quarter on a six-yard run by Charlie Lentz. Michigan's defense forced five turnovers (three interceptions and two fumble recoveries) and held Purdue to only 36 rushing yards and 122 passing yards in the game.

Michigan's starting lineup against Purdue was Rifenburg (left end), Soboleski (left tackle), Tomasi (left guard), Dworsky (center), Wilkins (right guard), Kohl (right tackle), McNeill (right end), Elliott (quarterback), Ortmann (left halfback), Koceski (right halfback), and Peterson (fullback).

=== Week 4: Northwestern ===
Week 4: Northwestern at Michigan

Team	1	2	3	4	Total
Northwestern (3–0)	0	0	0	0	0
• Michigan (3–0)	7	0	7	14	28

- Date: October 16, 1948
- Location: Michigan Stadium
  Ann Arbor, Michigan
- Game attendance: 85,938
- Referee: William A. Blake

In the fourth game of the season, Michigan faced Northwestern in Ann Arbor. The game matched the No. 3 team in the country (Northwestern) against the No. 4 team (Michigan). The Wolverines outgained the Wildcats 166 to 47 in rushing yards, as halfback Leo Koceski scored three touchdowns. Michigan scored late in the first quarter after Koceski returned a punt 37 yards to the Northwestern 33-yard line. In the third quarter, Michigan drove inside Northwestern's one-yard line, but the Wildcats' defense held and took over on downs.

The game remained close with Michigan leading 7–0 until late in the third quarter. Then, Michigan scored three touchdowns on seven plays. The scoring flurry began with a 45-yard punt return by Koceski to the Northwestern 22-yard line. With two seconds remaining in the third period, Teninga threw a jump pass to Koceski in the end zone to give Michigan a 14–0 lead. George Sundheim of Purdue fumbled the kickoff, and Harry Allis recovered the ball. On Michigan's second play from scrimmage, Chuck Ortmann threw a touchdown pass to Koceski. On Northwestern's first play from scrimmage after the next kickoff, Northwestern's Don Burson threw a pass that was intercepted by Irv Wisniewski at the 35-yard line. Wisniewski returned the ball to Northwestern's 13-yard line. On Michigan's second play after the interception, Koceski fumbled the ball into the endzone, but the ball was recovered by center Bob Erben to give Michigan a 28–0 lead. Northwestern drove deep into Michigan territory late in the fourth quarter, but the drive ended when Charlie Lentz intercepted a Don Burson pass at the seven-yard line. Michigan's defense forced four turnovers in the game, three on interceptions and one on a fumble recovery.

Through the first four games, Michigan had given up only seven points, and those points came on a disputed touchdown call against Michigan State. Allison Danzig in The New York Times called Michigan the "Defensive Standout Among Nation's College Elevens" and singled out two players: "Two players, in particular, are credited with the success of the Wolverine defense. Dan Dworsky, center and Fullback Dick Kempthorn would seem to be the best pair of backers-up in the inter-collegiate ranks."

Michigan's starting lineup against Northwestern was Wisniewski (left end), Wistert (left tackle), Heneveld (left guard), Dworsky (center), Sickels (right guard), Wahl (right tackle), Clark (right end), Elliott (quarterback), Allis (left halfback), Teninga (right halfback), and Kempthorn (fullback).

=== Week 5: at Minnesota ===
Week 5: Michigan at Minnesota

Team	1	2	3	4	Total
• Michigan (4–0)	0	13	7	7	27
Minnesota (3–1)	0	7	7	0	14

- Date: October 23, 1948
- Location: Memorial Stadium
  Minneapolis
- Game attendance: 65,130

In week 5, Michigan traveled to Minneapolis for the annual Little Brown Jug game. The game was matched No. 1 Michigan against No. 13 Minnesota. Michigan won the game, 27–14. Despite being held to 22 rushing yards, Michigan gained 261 yards on forward passes. At the start of the second quarter, Gene Derricotte fumbled a punt on Michigan's 15-yard line, recovered the ball, ran backward to the two-yard line, and fumbled again. All-American Leo Nomellini recovered the ball and carried it into the endzone to give Minnesota a 7–0 lead. Michigan drove to the Minnesota one-yard line on the next drive, but Tom Peterson fumbled and Minnesota recovered the ball at the 16-yard line. Two drives later, Michigan finally converted on a seven-yard touchdown pass from Wally Teninga to Tom Peterson. Less than 90 seconds after Peterson's tying touchdown, Michigan took the lead when Ed McNeill blocked a Minnesota punt, and Quentin Sickels recovered the ball at the one-yard line. Peterson ran it in for his second touchdown. Minnesota drove to Michigan's one-yard line at the end of the second quarter, but the clock expired and Michigan led 13–7 at halftime.

Minnesota took a 14–13 lead in the third quarter on a 69-yard drive capped by a touchdown run by Everett Faunce. On the next possession, Michigan drove 77 yards and took a 20–14 lead on a 37-yard touchdown pass to Dick Rifenburg. Rifenburg fumbled the ball at the five-yard line, but recovered his own fumble and continued into the endzone. In the fourth quarter, Wally Teninga intercepted a Bill Elliott pass on Michigan's 11-yard line and returned the ball 26 yards. Chuck Ortman connected with Leo Koceski on a jump pass that covered 62 yards (the last 50 by Koceski after the reception) to give Michigan its fourth touchdown. After watching Michigan's dominating performances over the best teams in the Big Nine Conference, Walter W. Ruch wrote in The New York Times that there could not be much doubt that "Oosterbaan has fashioned perhaps the finest team in the country."

Michigan's starting lineup against Minnesota was Rifenburg (left end), Soboleski (left tackle), Tomasi (left guard), Erben (center), Wilkins (right guard), Kohl (right tackle), McNeill (right end), Elliott (quarterback), Ortmann (left halfback), Koceski (right halfback), and Peterson (fullback).

=== Week 6: Illinois ===
Week 6: Illinois at Michigan

Team	1	2	3	4	Total
Illinois (2–3)	0	7	6	7	20
• Michigan (5–0)	0	7	14	7	28

- Date: October 30, 1948
- Location: Michigan Stadium
  Ann Arbor, Michigan
- Game attendance: 85,938
- Referee: Rollie Barnum

In the sixth week of the season, Michigan held its homecoming festivities and extended its winning streak to 20 games with a 28–20 win over Illinois. Michigan held on a goal-line stand in the first quarter (first-and-goal from the five-yard line), and Illinois failed to convert a field goal on fourth down. After a scoreless first quarter, Michigan went 98 yards on a drive that included a Statue of Liberty play by Leo Koceski and ended with a 15-yard bullet pass from Pete Elliott to Ed McNeill. Illinois followed with its own touchdown drive, capped by long touchdown run off a screen pass to Paul Patterson. The game was tied 7–7 at halftime.

On the opening kickoff in the second half, Illinois' Dwight Eddleman returned the kick 95 yards for an apparent touchdown, but the play was nullified due to an offside penalty. Michigan reclaimed the lead in the third quarter with 14-yard touchdown pass from Peterson to Rifenburg. Michigan extended its lead to 21–7 on a two-yard run by Wally Teninga later in the third quarter. Illinois scored its own third-quarter touchdown after Leo Koceski fumbled and Illinois recovered the ball at the Michigan 29-yard line. Early in the fourth quarter, Bernie Krueger scored on a quarterback sneak to cut Michigan's lead to 21–20. Michigan's final touchdown came on a 38-yard pass from Chuck Ortmann to Harry Allis. Allis converted all four extra point attempts in the game. Michigan outgained Illinois on the ground 102 to 40, but Illinois dominated in the air with 256 passing yards to 132 for Michigan. The New York Times called the game, witnessed by a homecoming crowd of 85,938, "one of the wildest fights in Big Nine history" and added, "What a battle this was! Not for a second could one be sure of the outcome."

Michigan's starting lineup against Illinois was Rifenburg (left end), Soboleski (left tackle), Tomasi (left guard), Erben (center), Wilkins (right guard), Kohl (right tackle), McNeill (right end), Elliott (quarterback), Ortmann (left halfback), Koceski (right halfback), and Peterson (fullback).

=== Week 7: Navy ===
Week 7: Navy at Michigan

Team	1	2	3	4	Total
Navy (0–6)	0	0	0	0	0
• Michigan (6–0)	7	7	14	7	35

- Date: November 6, 1948
- Location: Michigan Stadium
  Ann Arbor, Michigan
- Game attendance: 85,938
- Referee: Rupp (Lebanon Valley)

In the seventh game of the 1948 season, Michigan defeated Navy, 35–0, in front of a sellout crowd at Michigan Stadium. Michigan scored in the first quarter on a one-yard run by Chuck Ortmann. Tom Peterson extended Michigan's lead with a touchdown run in the second quarter. Michigan added two touchdowns in the third quarter on a run by Wally Teninga and an 18-yard touchdown pass from Bob Van Summern to Dick Rifenburg. The final touchdown came in the fourth quarter on a 60-yard touchdown pass from Ortmann to Rifenburg. Michigan outgained Navy on the ground 231 yards to 73 yards. Michigan's defense allowed only 119 yards of total offense (73 rushing yards and 46 passing yards), recovered three Navy fumbles and intercepted two passes, one by Dick Kempthorn and the other by Dan Dworsky. With the game in hand, Oosterbaan played the reserves, reportedly placing 44 players into the game.

Michigan's starting lineup against Navy was Rifenburg (left end), Soboleski (left tackle), Tomasi (left guard), Erben (center), Wilkins (right guard), Kohl (right tackle), McNeill (right end), Elliott (quarterback), Ortmann (left halfback), Koceski (right halfback), and Peterson (fullback).

=== Week 8: Indiana ===
Week 8: Indiana at Michigan

Team	1	2	3	4	Total
Indiana (2–5)	0	0	0	0	0
• Michigan (7–0)	7	14	13	20	54

- Date: November 13, 1948
- Location: Michigan Stadium
  Ann Arbor, Michigan
- Game attendance: 84,043

In the eighth game of the 1948 season, Michigan defeated Indiana, 54–0, for its most decisive win of the year. Michigan gained 435 yards of total offense, 285 on the ground and 150 in the air. The defense held Indiana, which was led by George Taliaferro, to 159 yards of total offense, 96 rushing and 63 passing. Michigan's eight touchdowns were scored by Tom Peterson, Dick Kempthorn, Harry Allis, Chuck Ortmann, Dick Rifenburg, Wally Teninga, Don Dufek and fullback Al Jackson. Ortmann completed eight of 15 passes for 123 yards, including a 13-yard touchdown toss to Allis in the second quarter. Pete Elliott also threw a five-yard touchdown pass to Rifenburg in the third quarter. Allis's streak of 14 straight extra point conversions was broken, as he kicked six extra points on eight tries. In its account of the game, the 1949 Michiganensian quipped, "Every man on the Michigan bench got into the ball game, and some spectators claimed that it was Hank Hatch, the equipment manager, who tallied the last Wolverine touchdown."

Michigan's starting lineup against Indiana was Clark (left end), Wistert (left tackle), Heneveld (left guard), Dworsky (center), Sickels (right guard), Allis (right tackle), McNeill (right end), Elliott (quarterback), Derricotte (left halfback), Teninga (right halfback), and Kempthorn (fullback).

=== Week 9: at Ohio State ===
Week 9: Michigan at Ohio State

Team	1	2	3	4	Total
• Michigan (8–0)	0	7	0	6	13
Ohio State (6–2)	3	0	0	0	3

- Date: November 20, 1948
- Location: Ohio Stadium
  Columbus, Ohio
- Game attendance: 78,603

Michigan concluded its 1948 season with a 13–3 win over Ohio State in Columbus. The game was played in front of a crowd of 82,754 spectators – the second largest crowd in Ohio Stadium history up to that time. Although Michigan was favored in the game by 14 points, Ohio State dominated the line of scrimmage in the first half, allowing only three first downs by Michigan, one of which came on a penalty. Ohio State took a 3–0 lead in the first quarter on a 26-yard field goal by Jim Hague. The kick followed a fumble recovery by Jack Lininger after an errant lateral by Chuck Ortmann. Michigan took the lead in the second quarter on a 92-yard drive culminating with a 44-yard touchdown pass from Ortmann to Harry Allis. In the fourth quarter, Michigan drove 62 yards for a second touchdown led by the passing of Wally Teninga and Pete Elliott. The touchdown was scored by fullback Tom Peterson. Allis converted the first extra point, but missed on the second. Ohio State outgained Michigan on the ground 130 yards to 54, but Michigan outgained Ohio State in the air 116 yards to 73.

Michigan's starting lineup against Ohio State was Rifenburg (left end), Soboleski (left tackle), Tomasi (left guard), Erben (center), Wilkins (right guard), Kohl (right tackle), McNeill (right end), Elliott (quarterback), Ortmann (left halfback), Koceski (right halfback), and Peterson (fullback).

=== National championship and post-season honors ===
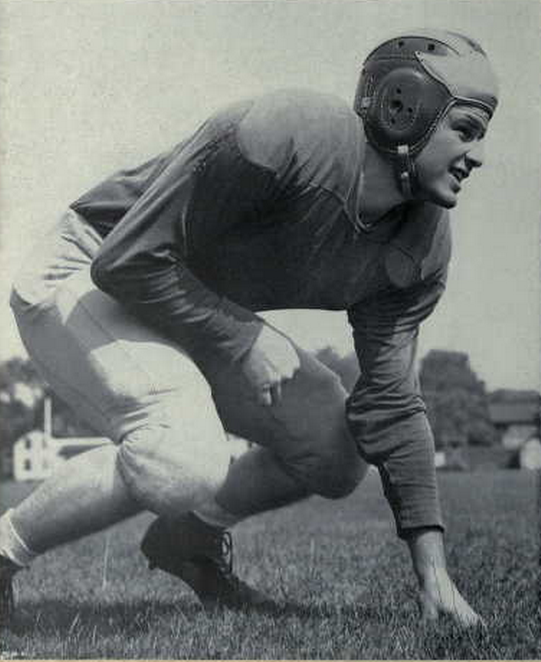
Team captain and MVP Dominic Tomasi

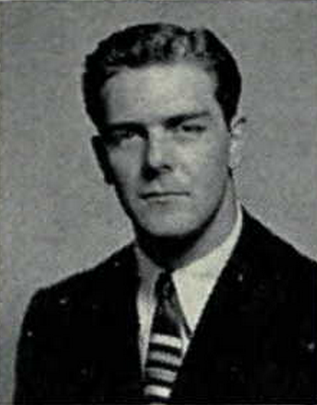
Consensus All-American Dick Rifenburg

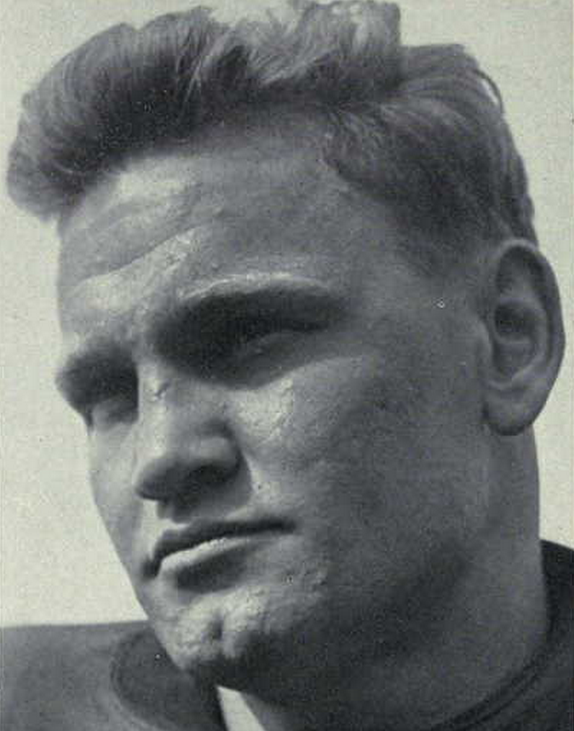
Defender Dick Kempthorn, known as "the Killer"

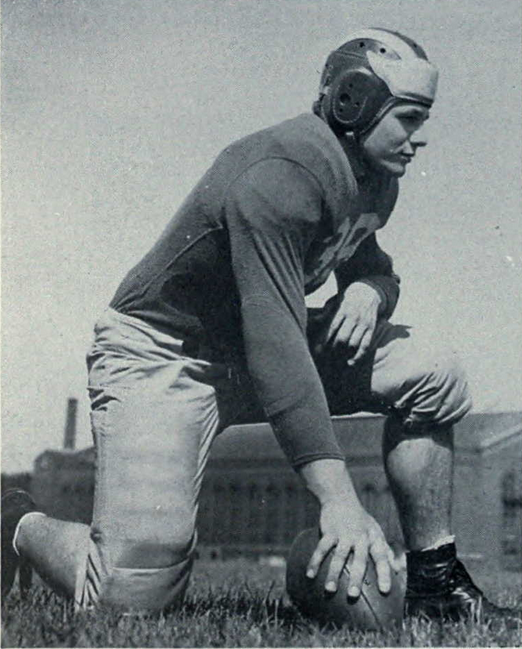
Center Dan Dworsky later designed Crisler Arena.

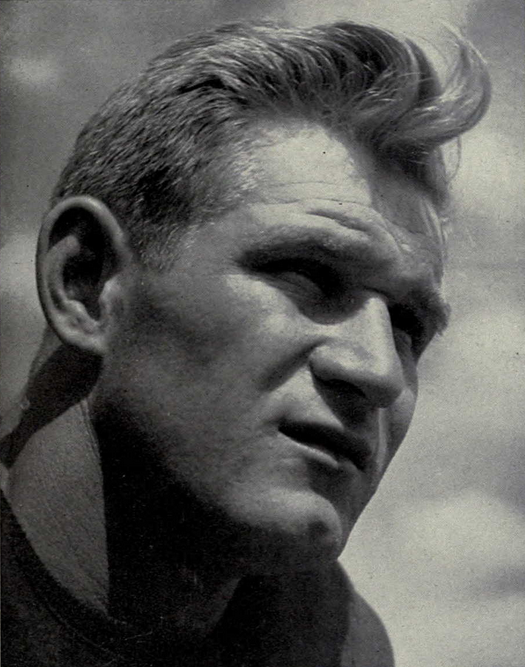
Halfback Leo Koceski, the "Canonsburg Comet"

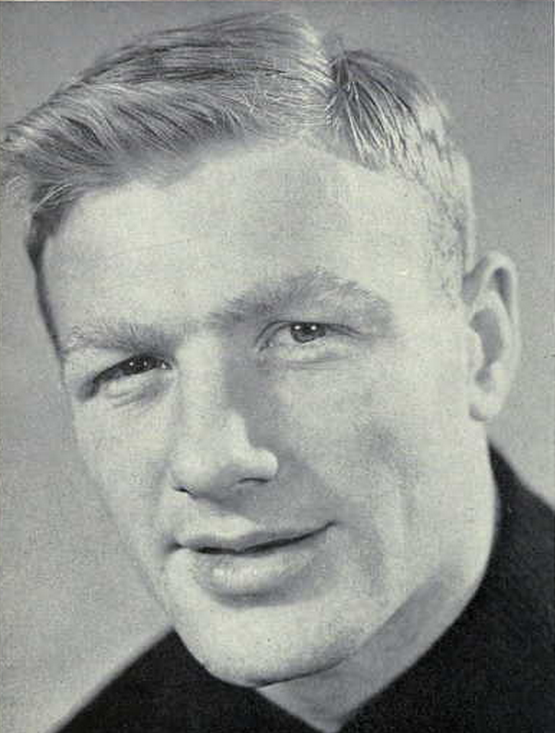
All-American quarterback Pete Elliott

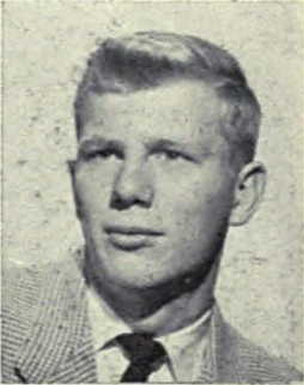
Halfback Chuck Ortmann led Michigan's passing attack in 1948.

In the final AP Poll released at the end of November 1948, Michigan was the pick for "the mythical national football championship." The sports writers voting in the final poll cast their first place votes as follows: Michigan (192), Notre Dame (97), North Carolina (31), and Oklahoma (30). Notre Dame finished the 1948 season with an undefeated 9–0–1 record, but Michigan's record was better against four of five common opponents. Writing in The New York Times, sports writer Allison Danzig wrote: "Another college football season ends with Michigan and Notre Dame again at the top."

Despite winning the Big Nine championship, Michigan was ineligible to represent the conference in the 1949 Rose Bowl. A Big Nine rule prohibited any team from making more than one Rose Bowl appearance in three years. Having represented the Big Nine in the 1948 Rose Bowl, Michigan would not be eligible to return to Pasadena until the 1950 season. The New York Times wrote that Michigan's victories "made a mockery of the arrangement which prevents a Big Nine team from succeeding itself in the Rose Bowl assignment."

In early December 1948, Bennie Oosterbaan was selected as the "Coach of the Year" in a nationwide poll of football coaches. Oosterbaan received 61 first place votes, nearly double the 33 first place votes cast for runner-up Lynn Waldorf of California. With Fritz Crisler having received the honor in 1947, Oosterbaan's selection was the first time the award had been given in consecutive years to coaches from the same university. Writing in the New York World-Telegram, Lawrence Robinson described the coaches' rationale for honoring Oosterbaan:

"They knew what Oosterbaan must have faced, taking over a championship team, generally rated No. 1 in the country in 1947 . . . and that had lost its entire backfield, both tackles, the center and the star end. They realize what it took to rebuild a team and keep it at a winning tempo. . . . They also knew that in all football there is no more solid citizen than quiet, modest Bennie Oosterbaan . . ."

End Dick Rifenburg and tackle Al Wistert were also honored in the post-season as consensus first-team players on the 1948 College Football All-America Team. Pete Elliott was also picked by the INS (the Hearst newspaper wire service) as a first-team All-American at defensive quarterback. Those same three players, as well as guard Dominic Tomasi, were selected as first-team All-Big Nine Conference players. Although Chuck Ortmann was not selected as a first-team All-American, Tommy Devine opined in The Sporting News:

"This blond, tousled-haired youngster from Milwaukee played the key role in moving Michigan to its second straight Western Conference championship and another claim to the national title. . . . Off his 1948 performance, Ortmann already is being rated along with the scintillating Tom Harmon and brilliant Bob Chappuis among Michigan's modern great backs."

== Statistics ==
=== Team ===
	Michigan	Opponents
Scoring	252	44
Points per game	28.0	4.8
First downs	134	100
Rushing	1,262	789
Passing	1,355	1,059
Total offense	2,617	1,848
Avg per game	290.7	205.3
Penalties-yards	277	318
Avg per game	30.7	35.3

== Players ==
=== Letterwinners ===
The following 34 players received varsity letters for their participation on the 1948 football team.

- Harry Allis – placekicker, punter, also started 2 games at left end and 1 game at left halfback; appeared in all 9 games
- Jim Atchison – left tackle (started 1 game); appeared in games against MSC, NW, Navy, Ind.
- Bill Bartlett – quarterback; appeared in games against Purdue, NW, Navy, Ind.
- Ozzie Clark – left end (started 4 games); appeared in all 9 games
- Gene Derricotte – left halfback (started 1 game); appeared in games against MSC, Minn., Ill., Navy, Ind., OSU
- Don Dufek, Sr. – fullback; appeared in games against NW, Navy, Ind.
- Dan Dworsky – center (defense); appeared in all 9 games
- Pete Elliott – quarterback (9 games); appeared in all 9 games
- Bob Erben – center (offense); appeared in all 9 games
- Dick Farrer – center; appeared in games against Purdue, Minn., Navy, Ind.
- John Ghindia – fullback (started 1 game); appeared in games against MSC, Navy, Ind.
- Lloyd A. Heneveld – left guard (started 2 games); right guard (started 1 game); appeared in all 9 games
- Don Hershberger – end; appeared in games against Purdue, NW, Navy, Ind., OSU
- Robert Hollway – end; appeared in games against Purdue, NW, Navy, Ind.
- Al Jackson – fullback; appeared in games against NW, Navy, Ind., OSU
- Dick Kempthorn – fullback (defense); appeared in games against Oregon, Purdue, NW, Minn., Ill., Navy, Ind., OSU
- Leo Koceski – right halfback (started 6 games); appeared in all 9 games
- Ralph Kohl – right tackle (started 6 games); appeared in games against MSC, Oregon, Purdue, NW, Minn., Navy, Ind., OSU
- Charles W. Lentz – halfback; appeared in games against Oregon, Purdue, NW, Minn., Navy, Ind.
- Don McClelland – left guard (started 1 game); appeared in games against MSC, Purdue, NW, Navy, Ind., OSU
- Edward D. McNeill – right end (started 7 games); appeared in games against MSC, Oregon, Purdue, Minn., Navy, Ind., OSU
- Bill Ohlenroth – tackle; appeared in games against Purdue, Navy, Ind.
- Chuck Ortmann – left halfback (started 7 games); appeared in all 9 games
- Tom Peterson – fullback (offense); appeared in all 9 games
- Dick Rifenburg – left end (started 3 games); appeared in all 9 games
- Quentin Sickels – left guard (started 1 game); right guard (started 1 game); appeared in all 9 games
- Joe Soboleski – left tackle (started 6 games); appeared in games against Oregon, Purdue, NW, Minn., Ill., Navy, Ind., OSU
- Wally Teninga – right halfback (started 3 games); appeared in all 9 games
- Dominic Tomasi – left guard (started 6 games); appeared in all 9 games
- Bob Van Summern – halfback; appeared in games against MSC, Oregon, Purdue, NW, Navy, Ind., OSU
- Robert Wahl – right tackle (started 3 games); appeared in games against MSC, Oregon, Purdue, NW, Minn., Navy, OSU
- Stu Wilkins – right guard (started 6 games); appeared in games against MSC, Oregon, Purdue, NW, Minn., Navy, Ind., OSU
- Irv Wisniewski – right end (started 2 games); appeared in games against MSC, Oregon, Purdue, NW, Navy, Ind., OSU
- Alvin Wistert – left tackle (started 2 games); appeared in all 9 games

=== Reserves ===
- John M. Anderson – end
- James F. Bremer – halfback
- Charles Cerecke – guard
- John Eizonas – tackle; appeared in game against Ind.
- Alan Fitch – guard; appeared in games against Navy, Ind.
- Leo M. Flynn – tackle
- Robert Freeman – end
- David L. Gomberg – tackle
- Remsen Henry – end
- John H. Hess – end; appeared in games against NW, Navy
- Norman E. Jackson – fullback
- William A. Jennings – halfback
- Carl A. Kreager – center; appeared in games against Navy, Ind.
- Irving Laker – end
- Byron Laksey – center
- Floyd Lasser – tackle
- Warren Lull – back
- S. James Manilla – halfback
- John E. Maturo – guard
- James Morrish – halfback
- John E. Obee – halfback
- Charles Olsen – halfback
- Peter Palmer – quarterback; appeared in games against Purdue, NW, Navy, Ind.
- Harold Pink – quarterback
- John E. Powers – guard
- Harold Raymond – guard; appeared in games against Navy, Ind.
- Sy Reiff – end
- Reginald G. Sauls – center
- Irwin Small – quarterback; appeared in games against Navy, Ind.
- Donald O. Souchek – halfback; appeared in games against Navy, Ind.
- Ralph A. Straffon – fullback; appeared in games against Purdue, Navy, Ind.
- George Sutherland – end; appeared in games against Minn., Navy, Ind.
- Rostom Tandoujian – tackle
- Walter H. Young – quarterback

== Awards and honors ==
- Captain: Dominic Tomasi
- All-Americans: Dick Rifenburg, Pete Elliott, Alvin Wistert
- All-Conference: Dick Rifenburg, Alvin Wistert, Dominic Tomasi, Pete Elliott
- Most Valuable Player: Dominic Tomasi
- Meyer Morton Award: Leo Koceski

== Coaches and staff ==
- Head coach: Bennie Oosterbaan
- Assistant coaches:

- Jack Blott – line coach
- George Ceithaml – backfield coach
- Cliff Keen – head wrestling coach and assistant football coach
- Ernie McCoy – head basketball coach and football scout and assistant to Wally Weber on the "B" team
- Bill Orwig – end coach
- Don Robinson – junior varsity coach
- Wally Weber – freshman coach
- J. T. White – junior varsity coach

- Trainer: Jim Hunt
- Manager: Bill Hickey
