= Art Murakowski =

American football player and politician (1925–1985)

No. 35
- Positions: Fullback, linebacker, halfback

Personal information
- Born: March 15, 1925; East Chicago, Indiana, U.S.
- Died: September 13, 1985 (aged 60); Hammond, Indiana, U.S.
- Listed height: 6 ft 0 in (1.83 m)
- Listed weight: 195 lb (88 kg)

Career information
- High school: Washington (East Chicago)
- College: Northwestern (1946–1949)
- NFL draft: 1950: 3rd round, 31st overall pick

Career history
- Detroit Lions (1951)

Awards and highlights
- First-team All-American (1948); Chicago Tribune Silver Football (1948); First-team All-Big Nine (1948)

Career NFL statistics
- Games played: 12
- Stats at Pro Football Reference

Arthur Raymond Murakowski (March 15, 1925 – September 13, 1985) was an American professional football player. He played fullback for the Northwestern University football team from 1946 to 1949. He was selected as a first-team All-American and won the Chicago Tribune Silver Football trophy in 1948 as the most valuable player in the Big Ten Conference. He played professional football for the Detroit Lions in 1951 and served as an Indiana state legislator and civil servant from 1954 to 1985.

== Early life ==
Murakowski was born in East Chicago, Indiana, in 1925. He attended East Chicago's Washington High School where he won four varsity letters in football and was selected as an Indiana all-state fullback. He also won a letter in track and field as a shot putter. Murakowski played on a Washington High School team that also featured future Northwestern teammates Alex Sarkisian and Ed Nemeth. The Los Angeles Times described Murakowski's high school play as follows: "Virtually as big then as now Murakowski was one of those battering-ram, interference-follow me fullbacks in high school. It must have been some fearsome!"

=== Military service ===
Murakowski graduated from high school during World War II and served 32 months in the U.S. Navy. He played football for Tony Hinkle on the Great Lakes Naval Training Station team in 1944 before being assigned to sea duty. He served for 18 months as a fireman first class on a destroyer mine layer that participated in the Battle of Okinawa in the spring of 1945. Off Okinawa, a Japanese kamikaze plane crashed into the ship's superstructure, killing 19 crew members. Murakowski was unharmed in the attack and later recalled, "I felt a little funny. I was below handling five inch ammunition."

== Northwestern ==
=== 1946 season ===
In 1946, Murakowski was discharged from the Navy and enrolled at Northwestern University. As a freshman, he won a varsity letter for Pappy Waldorf's Wildcats football team.

=== 1947 season ===
In 1947, Northwestern's new coach Bob Voigts moved Murakowski to the right halfback, but the experiment was not successful and Murakowski was returned to the fullback position. He was the leading ground gainer and scorer for the 1947 Wildcats and was selected as the team's most valuable player.

=== 1948 season ===
Murakowski won his greatest acclaim as a junior in 1948. For the second consecutive year, he was Northwestern's starting fullback and its leading ground gainer and scorer. The Chicago Daily Tribune called him the "key" to the Wildcats' offense

As long as the Wildcats retain the services of Art Murakowski, line smasher extraordinary, their full backing worries will be practically non-existent. ... It's no secret Northwestern's attack centers around the power plunges and sweeps of Mr. Murakowski. He's been the key to the offense since 1946 and last year [1948] he reached his peak performance as he gained 622 yards in 119 carries for a 5.2 average.

In addition to playing offense in 1948, he also played on defense as a right halfback. He had game-saving tackles against Ohio State and Wisconsin that helped the Wildcats win a berth in the 1949 Rose Bowl. Murakowski noted at the time, "It's tough for the guys on the bench, but when you're playing you want to keep on playing -- and defense is just as interesting as offense." Northwestern coach Voigts in late 1948 praised Murakowski for adapting to the defensive assignment

He has terrific speed. We started using him on defense midway in the season and he adapted to that very quickly. He's as good a defensive back as there is in the conference, being exceptionally fine on trap plays. His speed makes him very good on end sweeps.

One of the highlights of the 1948 season for Murakowski was his 91-yard touchdown run after intercepting a pass against Notre Dame. In a post-season poll by the Associated Press, Murakowski's interception return tied with Bobby Stuart's 103-yard kickoff return for Army as the most spectacular play of the 1948 season.

At the end of the 1948 football season, Murakowski was selected as a first-team All-American by the Associated Press. In selecting him as an All-American, the Associated Press wrote: "Art Murakowski, Northwestern's 195-pound fullback, played a prominent part in the success of the Wildcats. He excelled both on offense and defense."

Murakowski also won the Chicago Tribune Silver Football trophy in 1948 as the most valuable player in the Big Ten Conference. The Silver Football award was based on voting by the conference's football coaches, Big Ten Commissioner Kenneth L. Wilson and the Chicago Tribune's sports editor and football writer.

==== 1949 Rose Bowl ====
The 1948 Northwestern Wildcats finished in second place in the Big Ten Conference, but conference rules prevented conference champion Michigan from playing in consecutive Rose Bowl games. Accordingly, the Wildcats were invited to play in the 1949 Rose Bowl against the University of California. Northwestern won the game 20–14 on the strength of a controversial touchdown scored by Murakowski in the second quarter. Murakowski fumbled the ball as he ran into the endzone from the one-yard line, and field judge Jay Berwanger ruled that the ball crossed the goal line before the fumble, thus allowing the touchdown to stand. Photographs published the next day by the Los Angeles Times showed the ball having left Murakowski's arms while his feet were still short of the goal line. The Times reported: "The Times picture clearly shows that Murakowski's feet still are on the field of play and that he has lost the ball. If his was the case, Cal's recovery of the fumble made it Cal's ball on the 20-yard line." The Associated Press article featured the headline, "Did Murakowski Score or Didn't He?" and noted, "Photographs show clearly that Murakowski fumbled about a yard out when he scored the Wildcat's second touchdown in Saturday's Rose Bowl game." Murakowski said at the time, "I was sure I was across. There was only a yard to go on the play and I was over. Somebody tackled me from behind and pulled me back. That's when I fumbled." California fans protested the "phantom touchdown" and continued decades later to insist that the Rose Bowl committee should put an asterisk in the record book next to the game's final score, because of the disputed touchdown.

=== 1949 season ===
As a senior in 1949, Murakowski shared the starting fullback position with Gaspar Perricone. In September, he ran for a 30-yard touchdown against Purdue. for 20-6 Victory And in early November, Murakowski scored Northwestern's only touchdown against Wisconsin on a 79-yard punt return. The Racine Journal Times described the return as follows: "As he made the catch Murakowski bobbled the ball a bit. Then getting the thing tucked away under his arm he set out for the sidelines. At the 30 Wisconsin tacklers appeared to have him pinned against the sideline, but he slipped through and after another 10 yards was out in front with only Christensen having a chance to pursue him." He was honored at the end of the 1949 season by being selected to play for the East team in the East-West Shrine Game. Murakowski helped lead the East team to 28–6 win and tied for the most yards gained in the 1949 Shrine Game with 108 yards on 21 carries.

== Professional football ==
Murakowski was selected by the Detroit Lions in the third round (31st overall pick) in the 1950 NFL draft. He did not sign a contract with the Lions in 1950 and did not play professional football that year. He signed with the Lions in January 1951 and was the first player signed by the Lions' new coach Buddy Parker. Murakowski appeared in all 12 games for the 1951 Detroit Lions, mostly as a linebacker on defense.

In March 1952, the Lions traded Murakowski and Bob Momsen to the Chicago Cardinals for veteran quarterback Jim Hardy. Although the Chicago Tribune reports that Murakowski played for the Chicago Cardinals, he apparently did not play in any regular season games for the team.

== Government service ==
After retiring as a football player, Murakowski worked for 31 years for county and local government in Lake County and North Township, Indiana. He was the chief clerk in the county assessor's office from 1954 to 1968. In 1968, he took a position as a supervisor in the assessor's office of North Township. He was also elected as a Democrat to several terms in the Indiana House of Representatives starting in 1964 and continuing into the 1970s.

== Family and death ==
Murakowski died in 1985 at age 60 at his home in Hammond, Indiana. He was survived by his wife, Lucille Murakowski, three sons, and three daughters.
