= 1948 Indiana Hoosiers football team =

American college football season

1948 Indiana Hoosiers football
- Conference: Big Nine Conference
- Record: 2–7 (2–4 Big Nine)
- Head coach: Clyde B. Smith (1st season)
- MVP: George Taliaferro
- Captain: John Goldsberry
- Home stadium: Memorial Stadium

1948 Big Nine Conference football standings
	Conf.					Overall
Team	W		L		T	W		L		T
No. 1 Michigan $	6	–	0	–	0	9	–	0	–	0
No. 7 Northwestern	5	–	1	–	0	8	–	2	–	0
No. 16 Minnesota	5	–	2	–	0	7	–	2	–	0
Ohio State	3	–	3	–	0	6	–	3	–	0
Iowa	2	–	4	–	0	4	–	5	–	0
Purdue	2	–	4	–	0	3	–	6	–	0
Indiana	2	–	4	–	0	2	–	7	–	0
Illinois	2	–	5	–	0	3	–	6	–	0
Wisconsin	1	–	5	–	0	2	–	7	–	0
$ – Conference champion; Rankings from AP Poll

The 1948 Indiana Hoosiers football team represented the Indiana Hoosiers in the 1948 Big Nine Conference football season. They participated as members of the Big Nine Conference. The Hoosiers played their home games at Memorial Stadium in Bloomington, Indiana. The team was coached by Clyde B. Smith, in his first year as head coach of the Hoosiers.

Indiana was ranked at No. 63 in the final Litkenhous Difference by Score System ratings for 1948.

== Schedule ==
Date	Opponent	Rank	Site	Result	Attendance	Source
September 25	at Wisconsin		Camp Randall Stadium; Madison, WI	W 35–7	40,000	
October 2	Iowa		Memorial Stadium; Bloomington, IN	W 7–0		
October 9	TCU*	No. 17	Memorial Stadium; Bloomington, IN	L 6–7	28,000	
October 16	Ohio State		Memorial Stadium; Bloomington, IN	L 0–17	32,000	
October 23	at Pittsburgh*		Pitt Stadium; Pittsburgh, PA	L 14–21	17,118	
October 30	at No. 15 Minnesota		Memorial Stadium; Minneapolis, MN	L 7–30	64,926	
November 6	No. 1 Notre Dame*		Memorial Stadium; Bloomington, IN	L 6–42	34,000	
November 13	at No. 1 Michigan		Michigan Stadium; Ann Arbor, MI	L 0–54	84,043	
November 20	at Purdue		Ross–Ade Stadium; West Lafayette, IN (Old Oaken Bucket)	L 0–39	47,000	
*Non-conference game; Rankings from AP Poll released prior to the game

== Rankings ==
Ranking movements Legend: ██ Increase in ranking ██ Decrease in ranking — = Not ranked
	Week								
Poll	1	2	3	4	5	6	7	8	Final
AP	17	—	—	—	—	—	—	—	—

== 1949 NFL draftees ==
Player	Position	Round	Pick	NFL club
John Goldsberry	Tackle	4	40	Chicago Cardinals
George Taliaferro	Back	13	129	Chicago Bears
Jerry Morrical	Tackle	16	155	New York Giants
Nick Sebek	Back	25	248	Los Angeles Rams
