= 1948 Northwestern Wildcats football team =

American college football season

1948 Northwestern Wildcats football

Rose Bowl champion

Rose Bowl, W 20–14 vs. California
- Conference: Big Nine Conference

Ranking
- AP: No. 7
- Record: 8–2 (5–1 Big Nine)
- Head coach: Bob Voigts (2nd season)
- MVP: Art Murakowski
- Captain: Alex Sarkisian
- Home stadium: Dyche Stadium

1948 Big Nine Conference football standings
	Conf.					Overall
Team	W		L		T	W		L		T
No. 1 Michigan $	6	–	0	–	0	9	–	0	–	0
No. 7 Northwestern	5	–	1	–	0	8	–	2	–	0
No. 16 Minnesota	5	–	2	–	0	7	–	2	–	0
Ohio State	3	–	3	–	0	6	–	3	–	0
Iowa	2	–	4	–	0	4	–	5	–	0
Purdue	2	–	4	–	0	3	–	6	–	0
Indiana	2	–	4	–	0	2	–	7	–	0
Illinois	2	–	5	–	0	3	–	6	–	0
Wisconsin	1	–	5	–	0	2	–	7	–	0
$ – Conference champion; Rankings from AP Poll

The 1948 Northwestern Wildcats football team represented Northwestern University in the 1948 Big Nine Conference football season. The Wildcats won their first Rose Bowl in program history.

Northwestern finished the season with an 8–2 record, losing only to perennial powerhouses Michigan, 28–0, and Notre Dame, 17–12. Northwestern blanked UCLA, 19–0, Purdue, 21–0, and Syracuse, 48–0. The Wildcats rallied from three turnovers and a 16-point deficit to defeat Minnesota, 19–16, and beat Ohio State, 21–7, Wisconsin, 16–7, and Illinois, 20–7. Big Nine Conference rules prevented conference champion Michigan from making a successive trip to the Rose Bowl, so second-place Northwestern won the bid instead.

== Schedule ==
Date	Opponent	Rank	Site	Result	Attendance	Source
September 25	at UCLA*		Los Angeles Memorial Coliseum; Los Angeles, CA	W 19–0	55,156	
October 2	Purdue		Dyche Stadium; Evanston, IL	W 21–0	37,000	
October 9	No. 8 Minnesota	No. 3	Dyche Stadium; Evanston, IL	W 19–16	47,000	
October 16	at No. 4 Michigan	No. 3	Michigan Stadium; Ann Arbor, MI (rivalry)	L 0–28	87,782	
October 23	Syracuse*	No. 10	Dyche Stadium; Evanston, IL	W 48–0	35,000	
October 30	Ohio State	No. 9	Dyche Stadium; Evanston, IL	W 21–7	47,000	
November 6	at Wisconsin	No. 10	Camp Randall Stadium; Madison, WI	W 16–7	45,000	
November 13	at No. 2 Notre Dame*	No. 8	Notre Dame Stadium; Notre Dame, IN (rivalry)	L 7–12	59,305	
November 20	Illinois	No. 7	Dyche Stadium; Evanston, IL (rivalry)	W 20–7	47,000	
January 1	vs. No. 5 California*	No. 7	Rose Bowl; Pasadena, CA (Rose Bowl)	W 20–14	93,000	
*Non-conference game; Rankings from AP Poll released prior to the game

== Rankings ==
Ranking movements Legend: ██ Increase in ranking ██ Decrease in ranking ( ) = First-place votes
	Week								
Poll	1	2	3	4	5	6	7	8	Final
AP	3 (21)	3 (25)	10	9	10	8	7	7	7

== Roster ==
1. 10 Bob Nelson
2. 11 Loran "PeeWee" Day (halfback and safety)
3. 14 Gene Miller
4. 15 Ed Tunnicliff(halfback)
5. 16 Tom Worthington (halfback)
6. 19 Bob Meeder
7. 20 Lloyd Hawkinson
8. 21 Don Burson (quarterback)
9. 22 Frank Aschenbrenner (halfback)
10. 23 Pat Keefe (quarterback)
11. 25 John Yungwirth
12. 26 Jim Farrar (extra points)
13. 29 Dick Flowers (quarterback)
14. 30 Art Murakowski (fullback)
15. 32 Armandy Cureau
16. 33 Ralph Rossi
17. 34 Gasper Perricone (fullback)
18. 36 George Hlebasko
19. 37 George Sundheim
20. 42 Johnny Miller
21. 54 Alex Sarkisian (center). (team captain)
22. 55 Chuck Petter
23. 56 Ray Wietecha
24. 57 Dick Price
25. 60 Lawrence "Fatso" Day (linemen)
26. 61 Francis De Pauw
27. 62 Richard Anderson
28. 63 Bob Nowicki(guard)
29. 67 Ed Nemeth (left guard)
30. 68 Jim Parseigan
31. 69 LeRoy Pantera
32. 70 Joe Sewell
33. 73 Bill Ford
34. 71 Bill Forman (tackle)
35. 74 Steve Sawle (tackle)
36. 75 Rudy Cernoch (tackle)
37. 77 George Maddock (kick offs)
38. 78 Paul Barkal
39. 79 Dick Eggers
40. 80 Charles Hagmann (end)
41. 82 Burton Keddie (end)
42. 83 Don Stonesifer (end),
43. 85 Joe Zuravleff (end)
44. 87 Al Thomas
45. 88 Littrell Clark
46. 97 Paul Balog

== Awards and honors ==
- Art Murakowski, Chicago Tribune Silver Football

== 1949 NFL draft ==
Player	Position	Round	Pick	NFL club
George Sundheim	Back	12	115	New York Giants
