= 1948 Iowa Hawkeyes football team =

American college football season

1948 Iowa Hawkeyes football
- Conference: Big Nine Conference
- Record: 4–5 (2–4 Big Nine)
- Head coach: Eddie Anderson (7th season)
- MVP: Al DiMarco
- Home stadium: Iowa Stadium

1948 Big Nine Conference football standings
| | Conf. | | | | | Overall |
| Team | W | | L | | T | W | | L | | T |
|---|---|---|---|---|---|---|---|---|---|---|
| No. 1 Michigan $ | 6 | – | 0 | – | 0 | 9 | – | 0 | – | 0 |
| No. 7 Northwestern | 5 | – | 1 | – | 0 | 8 | – | 2 | – | 0 |
| No. 16 Minnesota | 5 | – | 2 | – | 0 | 7 | – | 2 | – | 0 |
| Ohio State | 3 | – | 3 | – | 0 | 6 | – | 3 | – | 0 |
| Iowa | 2 | – | 4 | – | 0 | 4 | – | 5 | – | 0 |
| Purdue | 2 | – | 4 | – | 0 | 3 | – | 6 | – | 0 |
| Indiana | 2 | – | 4 | – | 0 | 2 | – | 7 | – | 0 |
| Illinois | 2 | – | 5 | – | 0 | 3 | – | 6 | – | 0 |
| Wisconsin | 1 | – | 5 | – | 0 | 2 | – | 7 | – | 0 |
$ – Conference champion; Rankings from AP Poll

The 1948 Iowa Hawkeyes football team was an American football team that represented the University of Iowa in the 1948 Big Nine Conference football season. The team compiled a 4–5 record (2–4 against conference opponents) and finished in a tie for fifth place in the Big Nine Conference.

Iowa was ranked at No. 42 in the final Litkenhous Difference by Score System ratings for 1948.

Head coach Eddie Anderson was in his seventh and final season as Iowa's head coach; he was inducted into the College Football Hall of Fame in 1971.

The team's statistical leaders included Jerry Faske with 491 rushing yards, quarterback Al DiMarco with 1,105 passing yards, and Bob McKenzie with 382 receiving yards. DiMarco was selected as the team's most valuable player. Three Iowa players received either All-American or All-Big Nine honors in 1948:

- Tackle and future NFLer Bill Kay was selected by the Associated Press (AP) as a second-team honoree on the 1948 College Football All-America Team. He was also selected by both the AP and United Press (UP) as a first-team honoree on the 1948 All-Big Nine Conference football team.
- End Bob McKenzie was selected by the AP and UP as a second-team player on the All-Big Nine team.
- Al DiMarco was selected by the International News Service as a second-team player on its All-Big Nine team.

Other players of note on the 1948 team included Jack Dittmer, who later played six years in Major League Baseball.

The team played its home games at Iowa Stadium (now Kinnick Stadium). It drew 212,708 spectators at five home games, an average of 42,542 per game.

== Schedule ==
| Date | Opponent | Site | Result | Attendance | Source |
|---|---|---|---|---|---|
| September 25 | Marquette* | Iowa Stadium; Iowa City, IA | W 14–12 | | |
| October 2 | at Indiana | Memorial Stadium; Bloomington, IN | L 0–7 | | |
| October 9 | at No. 11 Ohio State | Ohio Stadium; Columbus, OH | W 14–7 | 63,394 | |
| October 16 | Purdue^{†} | Iowa Stadium; Iowa City, IA | L 13–20 | 47,000 | |
| October 23 | No. 2 Notre Dame* | Iowa Stadium; Iowa City, IA | L 12–27 | 53,000 | |
| October 30 | Wisconsin | Iowa Stadium; Iowa City, IA (rivalry) | W 19–13 | 38,000 | |
| November 6 | at Illinois | Memorial Stadium; Champaign, IL | L 0–14 | 41,502 | |
| November 13 | No. 14 Minnesota | Iowa Stadium; Iowa City, IA (rivalry) | L 21–28 | 44,000 | |
| November 20 | at Boston University* | Fenway Park; Boston, MA | W 34–14 | 12,848 | |
*Non-conference game; ^{†}Homecoming; Rankings from AP Poll released prior to the game
