= John Goldsberry (American football) =

American football player (1926–1972)

- John Goldsberry, 1947

No. 82
- Positions: Tackle, guard

Personal information
- Born: November 22, 1926; Indianapolis, Indiana, U.S.
- Died: January 23, 1972 (aged 45); South Bend, Indiana, U.S.
- Listed height: 6 ft 2 in (1.88 m)
- Listed weight: 245 lb (111 kg)

Career information
- High school: John Adams (Indiana)
- College: Indiana
- NFL draft: 1949: 4th round, 40th overall pick

Career history
- Chicago Cardinals (1949–1950)

Career NFL statistics
- Games: 20
- Stats at Pro Football Reference

John Gerard Goldsberry (November 22, 1926 – January 23, 1972) was an American professional football defensive tackle and tackle.

Goldsberry was born in 1926 in Indianapolis. As a boy, Goldsberry's father, Alonzo Goldsberry, coached various Indiana football teams, including Wabash College. The younger Goldsberry attended John Adams High School in South Bend, Indiana. In April 1945, he became only the third Indiana high school athlete to exceed 53 feet in the 12-pound shot put. He also won the state shot put title in both his junior and senior years and starred in football and basketball in high school.

He played college football for the Indiana Hoosiers from 1945 to 1948. He was the regular right tackle on the 1945 Indiana team that won the Big Ten Conference championship. He missed the last half of the 1947 after suffering a knee injury and undergoing surgery to repair the knee. He was selected as captain of the 1948 Indiana Hoosiers football team.

Goldsberry was selected by the Chicago Cardinals in the fourth round (40th overall pick) of the 1948 NFL draft. He played professional football in the National Football League (NFL) for the Chicago Cardinals in the 1949 and 1950 seasons, appearing in a total of 21 NFL games at the guard and tackle positions.

After retiring from football, he worked as an agent for Jefferson National Life Insurance Co. for 22 years. He died in 1972 at age 45.
