= 1948 Wisconsin Badgers football team =

American college football season

1948 Wisconsin Badgers football
- Conference: Big Nine Conference
- Record: 2–7 (1–5 Big Nine)
- Head coach: Harry Stuhldreher (13th season)
- MVP: Red Wilson
- Captain: Wally Dreyer
- Home stadium: Camp Randall Stadium

1948 Big Nine Conference football standings
	Conf.					Overall
Team	W		L		T	W		L		T
No. 1 Michigan $	6	–	0	–	0	9	–	0	–	0
No. 7 Northwestern	5	–	1	–	0	8	–	2	–	0
No. 16 Minnesota	5	–	2	–	0	7	–	2	–	0
Ohio State	3	–	3	–	0	6	–	3	–	0
Iowa	2	–	4	–	0	4	–	5	–	0
Purdue	2	–	4	–	0	3	–	6	–	0
Indiana	2	–	4	–	0	2	–	7	–	0
Illinois	2	–	5	–	0	3	–	6	–	0
Wisconsin	1	–	5	–	0	2	–	7	–	0
$ – Conference champion; Rankings from AP Poll

The 1948 Wisconsin Badgers football team was an American football team that represented the University of Wisconsin in the 1948 Big Nine Conference football season. The team compiled a 2–7 record (1–5 against conference opponents) and finished in last place in the Big Nine Conference. Harry Stuhldreher was in his 13th and final year as Wisconsin's head coach. The team averaged 258.6 yards per game of total offense, 200.6 yards per game by rushing, and 58.0 yards by passing.

The team's statistical leaders included Ben Bendrick with 327 rushing yards, Bob Petruska with 125 passing yards, Jim Embach with 92 receiving yards, and Wally Dreyer with 24 points scored. Center Red Wilson received the team's most valuable player award for the second consecutive year. Wilson also received second-team honors from the International News Service on the 1948 All-Big Nine Conference football team. Wally Dreyer was the team captain.

At the annual Minnesota–Wisconsin football rivalry game held on November 20, Paul Bunyan's Axe was introduced as a trophy to be awarded to the winner. Minnesota won the 1948 game, 16–0.

On December 11, four days before a student referendum on whether he should keep his job, and in the face of "Goodbye Harry" signs, Stuhldreher resigned as Wisconsin's head football coach, though he retained his job as athletic director.

Wisconsin was ranked at No. 52 in the final Litkenhous Difference by Score System ratings for 1948.

The team played its home games at Camp Randall Stadium. During the 1948 season, the average attendance at home games was 44,167.

== Schedule ==
Date	Opponent	Site	Result	Attendance
September 25	Indiana	Camp Randall Stadium; Madison, WI	L 7–35	40,000
October 2	Illinois	Camp Randall Stadium; Madison, WI	W 20–16	45,000
October 9	at No. 9 California*	California Memorial Stadium; Berkeley, CA	L 14–40	66,000
October 16	Yale*	Camp Randall Stadium; Madison, WI	L 7–17	44,000–45,000
October 23	at Ohio State	Ohio Stadium; Columbus, OH	L 32–34	76,677
October 30	at Iowa	Iowa Stadium; Iowa City, IA (rivalry)	L 13–19	38,000
November 6	No. 10 Northwestern^{†}	Camp Randall Stadium; Madison, WI	L 7–16	45,000
November 13	Marquette*	Camp Randall Stadium; Madison, WI	W 26–0	45,000
November 20	No. 15 Minnesota	Camp Randall Stadium; Madison, WI (rivalry)	L 0–16	45,000
*Non-conference game; ^{†}Homecoming; Rankings from AP Poll released prior to the game

== Game summaries ==
On September 25, Indiana defeated Wisconsin, 35–7, before a crowd of 40,000 at Camp Randall Stadium in Madison, Wisconsin. The game was the first for Clyde B. Smith as Indiana's head coach. Indiana halfback George Taliaferro scored three touchdowns and played 51 minutes.

On October 2, Wisconsin defeated Illinois, 20–16, before a crowd of 45,000 at Camp Randall Stadium in Madison. Wisconsin halfback Clarence Self scored two touchdowns, including the game-winning touchdown with less than three minutes left to play.

On October 9, Wisconsin lost to California, 40–14, before a crowd of 66,000 at California Memorial Stadium in Berkeley, California.

On October 16, Wisconsin lost to Yale, 17–7, before a crowd of 44,000 to 45,000 at Camp Randall Stadium in Madison.

On October 23, Ohio State defeated Wisconsin, 34–32, before a crowd of 77,205 at Ohio Stadium in Columbus. Ohio State rallied from behind twice, including deficits of 19-7 and 33–20, in a game that The Cincinnati Enquirer called "one of the most scintillating, hair-raising games ever staged in Buckeye Stadium". Each team scored five touchdowns, but Wisconsin was able to convert only two kicks for extra point. Wisconsin's line prevented Ohio State from advancing the ball on the ground, and the Buckeyes opened up a passing attack, led by Pandel Savic, that accounted for 211 yards and all five Ohio State touchdowns.

On October 30, Wisconsin lost to Iowa. After Wisconsin took a 13–0 lead, Iowa staged a comeback and won, 19–13, in Iowa City.

On November 6, Northwestern (ranked No. 10 in the AP Poll) defeated Wisconsin, 16–7, before a homecoming crowd of 45,000 at Camp Randall Stadium in Madison, Wisconsin. Northwestern led 2–0 at halftime, as the only points of the half came on a safety. Northwestern then added two touchdowns in the third quarter.

On November 13, Wisconsin shut out Marquette, 26–0, before a crowd of 43,000 at Camp Randall Stadium in Madison, Wisconsin. Wally Dreyer was the star for Wisconsin.

On November 20, in the annual Minnesota–Wisconsin football rivalry game, Minnesota (ranked No. 15 in the AP Poll) defeated Wisconsin, 16–0, before a crowd of 45,000 at Camp Randall Stadium in Madison. Minnesota exceeded Wisconsin in total yards by a tally of 425 to 88.
