= Warren Beson =

American football player and coach (1923–1959)

Biographical details
- Born: November 16, 1923; Minneapolis, Minnesota, U.S.
- Died: October 25, 1959 (aged 35); Northfield, Minnesota, U.S.

Playing career

Football
- 1945–1948: Minnesota
- 1949: Baltimore Colts
- Positions: Guard, center

Coaching career (HC unless noted)

Football
- 1950: La Crosse Central HS (WI)
- 1951–1955: Edina HS (MN)
- 1956–1959: Carleton

Baseball
- 1952–1956: Edina HS (MN)

Administrative career (AD unless noted)
- 1956–1959: Carleton

Head coaching record
- Overall: 21–9–2 (college football); 72–12 (high school baseball)

Accomplishments and honors

Championships
- Football; 1 MWC (1956)

Warren Lawson Beson (November 16, 1923 – October 25, 1959) was an American football player and coach. He played college football at the University of Minnesota in 1942 and from 1945 to 1948. He also played professional football in 1949 for the Baltimore Colts. He later worked as a high school football and baseball coach. From 1956 until his death in 1959, he was the head football coach and athletic director at Carleton College.

== Early years ==
Beson was born in Minneapolis in 1923. He attended West High School in that city, where he was an all-city football player in 1941.

Beson enrolled at the University of Minnesota in the fall of 1942 and played on the school's freshman football team. He enlisted in the United States Army in March 1943 and served for three years, reaching the rank of corporal. He was discharged in February 1946.

== Football player ==
Beson played guard and center on Bernie Bierman's Minnesota teams in 1947 and 1948 and was the captain of the 1948 team. He earned a reputation as an "iron man" due to the extensive minutes per game that he played on both offense and defense. The Gophers offensive line of those years has been called one of the great lines in the history of college football.

In January 1949, Beson signed to play professional football for the Baltimore Colts of the All-America Football Conference. He appeared in three games for the 1949 Colts, none as a starter. He was released by the Colts on September 29, 1949.

== Coaching career ==
Beson started coaching football and baseball at Edina High School in Minnesota in 1951, two years after the school's founding. In the next five years, each sport won three conference championships. His football record was 35–3–2, while in baseball, his teams were 72–12. Beson was inducted into the Edina Hornets Hall of Fame in 2001.

In May 1956, Beson left Edina to become head football coach, athletic director, and associate professor at Carleton College. In his first year, the Knights were tri-champions in the Midwest Conference. Through 1959, Beson's teams were 21–7–2, outscoring opponents by 632–397.

Beson suffered heart attacks in January 1958 and April 1959. He experienced shortness of breath during an October 1959 football game against Monmouth College, refused to leave the game, and continued coaching from a chair on the sidelines during the second half. He died early the next morning at age 35.

== Head coaching record ==
=== College football ===
Year	Team	Overall	Conference	Standing	Bowl/playoffs
Carleton Knights (Midwest Conference) (1956–1959)
1956	Carleton	6–2	6–2	T–1st	
1957	Carleton	6–1–1	6–1–1	2nd	
1958	Carleton	6–1–1	6–1–1	2nd	
1959	Carleton	3–5	3–5	7th	
Carleton:		21–9–2	21–9–2		
Total:		21–9–2			
National championship Conference title Conference division title or championship game berth
