= 1948 Purdue Boilermakers football team =

American college football season

1948 Purdue Boilermakers football
- Conference: Big Nine Conference
- Record: 3–6 (2–4 Big Nine)
- Head coach: Stu Holcomb (2nd season)
- MVP: Harry Szulborski
- Captain: Phil O'Reilly
- Home stadium: Ross–Ade Stadium

1948 Big Nine Conference football standings
	Conf.					Overall
Team	W		L		T	W		L		T
No. 1 Michigan $	6	–	0	–	0	9	–	0	–	0
No. 7 Northwestern	5	–	1	–	0	8	–	2	–	0
No. 16 Minnesota	5	–	2	–	0	7	–	2	–	0
Ohio State	3	–	3	–	0	6	–	3	–	0
Iowa	2	–	4	–	0	4	–	5	–	0
Purdue	2	–	4	–	0	3	–	6	–	0
Indiana	2	–	4	–	0	2	–	7	–	0
Illinois	2	–	5	–	0	3	–	6	–	0
Wisconsin	1	–	5	–	0	2	–	7	–	0
$ – Conference champion; Rankings from AP Poll

The 1948 Purdue Boilermakers football team was an American football team that represented Purdue University during the 1948 Big Nine Conference football season. In their second season under head coach Stu Holcomb, the Boilermakers compiled a 3–6 record, finished in a tie for fifth place in the Big Ten Conference with a 2–4 record against conference opponents, and were outscored by their opponents by a total of 175 to 126.

Several players from the 1948 team went on to have successful careers in football, both at the professional level and in coaching. Notable players from the 1948 Purdue team included halfback Harry Szulborski and tackle Phil O'Reilly.

Purdue was ranked at No. 34 in the final Litkenhous Difference by Score System ratings for 1948. Despite the challenges, the season helped lay the groundwork for future improvements in the program under Coach Holcomb's leadership.

== Schedule ==
Date	Opponent	Rank	Site	Result	Attendance	Source
September 25	at Notre Dame*		Notre Dame Stadium; Notre Dame, IN (rivalry)	L 27–28	59,343	
October 2	at Northwestern		Dyche Stadium; Evanston, IL	L 0–21	37,000	
October 9	No. 7 Michigan^{†}	No. 15	Ross–Ade Stadium; West Lafayette, IN	L 0–40	47,152	
October 16	at Iowa		Iowa Stadium; Iowa City, IA	W 20–13	47,000	
October 23	at Illinois		Memorial Stadium; Champaign, IL (rivalry)	L 6–10	56,451	
October 30	Marquette*		Ross–Ade Stadium; West Lafayette, IN	W 14–9	32,000	
November 6	at No. 19 Minnesota		Memorial Stadium; Minneapolis, MN	L 7–34	66,953	
November 13	Pittsburgh*		Ross–Ade Stadium; West Lafayette, IN	L 13–20	30,000–35,000	
November 20	Indiana		Ross–Ade Stadium; West Lafayette, IN (Old Oaken Bucket)	W 39–0	47,000	
*Non-conference game; ^{†}Homecoming; Rankings from AP Poll released prior to the game

== Rankings ==
Ranking movements Legend: ██ Increase in ranking ██ Decrease in ranking — = Not ranked
	Week								
Poll	1	2	3	4	5	6	7	8	Final
AP	15	—	—	—	—	—	—	—	—

== Game summaries ==
=== Marquette ===
- Harry Szulborski 29 rushes, 171 yards

=== Minnesota ===
- Harry Szulborski 15 rushes, 160 yards

=== Indiana ===
- Harry Szulborski 34 rushes, 197 yards
- Norbert Adams 24 rushes, 148 yards

== Roster ==
- Norbert Adams, HB
- Bob Agnew, FB
- Pete Barbolak, T
- John Beletic, T
- Ronald Bland, E
- Herb Campfield, FB
- John Considine, T
- Clement Crowe, C
- Bill Deem, G
- Bob DeMoss, QB
- Bill Feldkircher, QB
- Abe Gibron, G
- Ken Gorgal, QB
- Bob Grant, T
- Clyde Grimenstein, E
- Thomas Hard, G
- Bob Hartman, QB
- Bob Heck, E
- Bill Horvath, G-E
- Harley Jeffery, E
- Mike Kalapos, T
- Lou Karras, T
- John Kerestes, FB
- Steve Manich, HB
- Kenneth McCaffry, E
- Jack Milito, FB
- Bill Murray, G
- Phil O'Reilly, T
- George Punzelt, QB
- Elmer Scallish, G
- Stu Scheer, E
- Neil Schmidt, HB
- Rex Sebastian, E
- Kenneth Smith, G
- Bill Sprang, C
- Harry Szulborski, HB
- Jim Tate, T
- Rudy Trbovich, T
- Jim Weizer, G
- Bob Whitmer, E
