= 1948 Illinois Fighting Illini football team =

American college football season

1948 Illinois Fighting Illini football
- Conference: Big Nine Conference
- Record: 3–6 (2–5 Big Nine)
- Head coach: Ray Eliot (7th season)
- MVP: Jim Valek
- Captain: Herb Siegert
- Home stadium: Memorial Stadium

1948 Big Nine Conference football standings
	Conf.					Overall
Team	W		L		T	W		L		T
No. 1 Michigan $	6	–	0	–	0	9	–	0	–	0
No. 7 Northwestern	5	–	1	–	0	8	–	2	–	0
No. 16 Minnesota	5	–	2	–	0	7	–	2	–	0
Ohio State	3	–	3	–	0	6	–	3	–	0
Iowa	2	–	4	–	0	4	–	5	–	0
Purdue	2	–	4	–	0	3	–	6	–	0
Indiana	2	–	4	–	0	2	–	7	–	0
Illinois	2	–	5	–	0	3	–	6	–	0
Wisconsin	1	–	5	–	0	2	–	7	–	0
$ – Conference champion; Rankings from AP Poll

The 1948 Illinois Fighting Illini football team was an American football team that represented the University of Illinois as a member of the Big Nine Conference during the 1948 Big Nine season. In their seventh year under head coach Ray Eliot, the Fighting Illini compiled a 3–6 record (2–5 in conference games), finished in eighth place in the Big Nine, and were outscored by a total of 140 to 135. Illinois was ranked at No. 23 in the final Litkenhous Difference by Score System ratings for 1948.

End James Valek was selected as the team's most valuable player. Four Illinois players received first-team honors on the 1948 All-Big Nine Conference football team: guard Herb Siegert (AP-2, INS-2, UP-2); end Walt Kersulis (AP-2, UP-2); end Tony Klimek (INS-2); and Dwight Eddleman (INS-2).

The team played its home games at Memorial Stadium in Champaign, Illinois.

== Schedule ==
Date	Opponent	Site	Result	Attendance	Source
September 25	Kansas State*	Memorial Stadium; Champaign, IL	W 40–0	29,593	
October 2	at Wisconsin	Camp Randall Stadium; Madison, WI	L 16–20	45,000	
October 9	No. 5 Army*	Memorial Stadium; Champaign, IL	L 21–26	71,119	
October 16	at No. 11 Minnesota	Memorial Stadium; Minneapolis, MN	L 0–6	62,066	
October 23	Purdue	Memorial Stadium; Champaign, IL (rivalry)	W 10–6	56,451	
October 30	at No. 1 Michigan	Michigan Stadium; Ann Arbor, MI (rivalry)	L 20–28	85,872	
November 6	Iowa	Memorial Stadium; Champaign, IL	W 14–0	41,502	
November 13	Ohio State	Memorial Stadium; Champaign, IL (Illibuck)	L 7–34	65,732	
November 20	at No. 7 Northwestern	Dyche Stadium; Evanston, IL (rivalry)	L 7–20	47,000	
*Non-conference game; Rankings from AP Poll released prior to the game
