= 1948 Ohio State Buckeyes football team =

American college football season

1948 Ohio State Buckeyes football
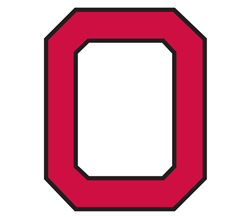
- Conference: Big Nine Conference
- Record: 6–3 (3–3 Big Nine)
- Head coach: Wes Fesler (2nd season)
- MVP: Joe Whisler
- Home stadium: Ohio Stadium

1948 Big Nine Conference football standings
| | Conf. | | | | | Overall |
| Team | W | | L | | T | W | | L | | T |
|---|---|---|---|---|---|---|---|---|---|---|
| No. 1 Michigan $ | 6 | – | 0 | – | 0 | 9 | – | 0 | – | 0 |
| No. 7 Northwestern | 5 | – | 1 | – | 0 | 8 | – | 2 | – | 0 |
| No. 16 Minnesota | 5 | – | 2 | – | 0 | 7 | – | 2 | – | 0 |
| Ohio State | 3 | – | 3 | – | 0 | 6 | – | 3 | – | 0 |
| Iowa | 2 | – | 4 | – | 0 | 4 | – | 5 | – | 0 |
| Purdue | 2 | – | 4 | – | 0 | 3 | – | 6 | – | 0 |
| Indiana | 2 | – | 4 | – | 0 | 2 | – | 7 | – | 0 |
| Illinois | 2 | – | 5 | – | 0 | 3 | – | 6 | – | 0 |
| Wisconsin | 1 | – | 5 | – | 0 | 2 | – | 7 | – | 0 |
$ – Conference champion; Rankings from AP Poll

The 1948 Ohio State Buckeyes football team represented Ohio State University in the 1948 Big Nine Conference football season. The Buckeyes compiled a 6–3 record, but lost to Michigan in the season finale. Ohio State outscored their opponents, 184–94, on the season.

Though unranked in the final AP Poll, Ohio State was ranked at No. 9 in the final Litkenhous Difference by Score System ratings for 1948.

== Schedule ==
| Date | Opponent | Rank | Site | Result | Attendance | Source |
|---|---|---|---|---|---|---|
| September 25 | Missouri* | | Ohio Stadium; Columbus, OH | W 21–7 | 57,042 | |
| October 2 | USC* | | Ohio Stadium; Columbus, OH | W 20–0 | 75,102 | |
| October 9 | Iowa | No. 11 | Ohio Stadium; Columbus, OH | L 7–14 | 63,394 | |
| October 16 | at Indiana | | Memorial Stadium; Bloomington, IN | W 17–0 | 32,000 | |
| October 23 | Wisconsin | | Ohio Stadium; Columbus, OH | W 34–32 | 76,677 | |
| October 30 | at No. 9 Northwestern | | Dyche Stadium; Evanston, IL | L 7–21 | 47,000 | |
| November 6 | Pittsburgh* | | Ohio Stadium; Columbus, OH | W 41–0 | 68,966 | |
| November 13 | at Illinois | | Memorial Stadium; Champaign, IL (Illibuck) | W 34–7 | 65,732 | |
| November 20 | No. 1 Michigan | No. 18 | Ohio Stadium; Columbus, OH (rivalry) | L 3–13 | 82,754 | |
*Non-conference game; Rankings from AP Poll released prior to the game

== Rankings ==
Ranking movements Legend: ██ Increase in ranking ██ Decrease in ranking — = Not ranked
| | Week | | | | | | | | |
| Poll | 1 | 2 | 3 | 4 | 5 | 6 | 7 | 8 | Final |
|---|---|---|---|---|---|---|---|---|---|
| AP | 11 | — | — | — | — | — | 18 | 17 | — |

== Coaching staff ==
- Wes Fesler, head coach, second year

== 1949 NFL draftees ==
| Player | Round | Pick | Position | NFL club |
|---|---|---|---|---|
| Gerry Krall | 6 | 59 | Defensive back | Chicago Bears |
| Jack Lininger | 21 | 202 | Linebacker | Detroit Lions |
