= 1948 Minnesota Golden Gophers football team =

American college football season

1948 Minnesota Golden Gophers football
- Conference: Big Nine Conference

Ranking
- AP: No. 16
- Record: 7–2 (5–2 Big Nine)
- Head coach: Bernie Bierman (14th season)
- MVP: Ev Faunce
- Captain: Warren Beson
- Home stadium: Memorial Stadium

1948 Big Nine Conference football standings
	Conf.					Overall
Team	W		L		T	W		L		T
No. 1 Michigan $	6	–	0	–	0	9	–	0	–	0
No. 7 Northwestern	5	–	1	–	0	8	–	2	–	0
No. 16 Minnesota	5	–	2	–	0	7	–	2	–	0
Ohio State	3	–	3	–	0	6	–	3	–	0
Iowa	2	–	4	–	0	4	–	5	–	0
Purdue	2	–	4	–	0	3	–	6	–	0
Indiana	2	–	4	–	0	2	–	7	–	0
Illinois	2	–	5	–	0	3	–	6	–	0
Wisconsin	1	–	5	–	0	2	–	7	–	0
$ – Conference champion; Rankings from AP Poll

The 1948 Minnesota Golden Gophers football team represented the University of Minnesota in the 1948 Big Nine Conference football season. In their 14th year under head coach Bernie Bierman, the Golden Gophers compiled a 7–2 record and outscored their opponents by a combined total of 203 to 94.

Guard Leo Nomellini was named All-American by Walter Camp Football Foundation, Associated Press (AP), Collier's Weekly/Grantland Rice, The Sporting News, INS, Look Magazine, Football Writers Association of America and the American Football Coaches Association. Nomellini and end Bud Grant were also named All-Big Ten.

Halfback Ev Faunce was awarded the Team MVP Award.

Total attendance for the season was 308,556, which averaged to 61,711. The season high for attendance was against Purdue.

== Schedule ==
Date	Opponent	Rank	Site	Result	Attendance	Source
September 25	at Washington*		Husky Stadium; Seattle, WA	W 20–0	40,000	
October 2	Nebraska*		Memorial Stadium; Minneapolis, MN (rivalry)	W 39–13	57,206	
October 9	at No. 3 Northwestern	No. 8	Dyche Stadium; Evanston, IL	L 16–19	47,000	
October 16	Illinois	No. 11	Memorial Stadium; Minneapolis, MN	W 6–0	62,066	
October 23	No. 1 Michigan	No. 13	Memorial Stadium; Minneapolis, MN (Little Brown Jug)	L 14–27	65,130	
October 30	Indiana^{†}	No. 15	Memorial Stadium; Minneapolis, MN	W 30–7	64,926	
November 6	Purdue	No. 19	Memorial Stadium; Minneapolis, MN	W 34–7	66,953	
November 13	at Iowa	No. 14	Iowa Stadium; Iowa City, IA (rivalry)	W 28–21	44,000	
November 20	at Wisconsin	No. 15	Camp Randall Stadium; Madison, WI (rivalry)	W 16–0	45,000	
*Non-conference game; ^{†}Homecoming; Rankings from AP Poll released prior to the game

== Rankings ==
Ranking movements Legend: ██ Increase in ranking ██ Decrease in ranking
	Week								
Poll	1	2	3	4	5	6	7	8	Final
AP	8	11	13	15	19	14	15	13	16

== Game summaries ==
=== Michigan ===
Week 5: Michigan at Minnesota

Team	1	2	3	4	Total
• Michigan (4–0)	0	13	7	7	27
Minnesota (3–1)	0	7	7	0	14

- Date: October 23, 1948
- Location: Memorial Stadium
  Minneapolis
- Game attendance: 65,130

In week 5, Minnesota met Michigan in the annual Little Brown Jug game. The game was matched No. 1 Michigan against No. 13 Minnesota. Michigan won the game, 27–14. Despite being held to 22 rushing yards, Michigan gained 261 yards on forward passes. At the start of the second quarter, Gene Derricotte fumbled a punt on Michigan's 15-yard line, recovered the ball, ran backward to the two-yard line, and fumbled again. All-American Leo Nomellini recovered the ball and carried it into the end zone to give Minnesota a 7–0 lead. Michigan drove to the Minnesota one-yard line on the next drive, but Tom Peterson fumbled and Minnesota recovered the ball at the 16-yard line. Two drives later, Michigan finally converted on a seven-yard touchdown pass from Wally Teninga to Tom Peterson. Less than 90 seconds after Peterson's tying touchdown, Michigan took the lead when Ed McNeill blocked a Minnesota punt, and Quentin Sickels recovered the ball at the one-yard line. Peterson ran it in for his second touchdown. Minnesota drove to Michigan's one-yard line at the end of the second quarter, but the clock expired and Michigan led 13–7 at halftime.

Minnesota took a 14–13 lead in the third quarter on a 69-yard drive capped by a touchdown run by Everett Faunce. On the next possession, Michigan drove 77 yards and took a 20–14 lead on a 37-yard touchdown pass to Dick Rifenburg, who fumbled at the five-yard line, but the ball and continued into the endzone. In the fourth quarter, Wally Teninga intercepted a Bill Elliott pass on Michigan's 11-yard line and returned the ball 26 yards. Chuck Ortman connected with Leo Koceski on a jump pass that covered 62 yards (the last 50 by Koceski after the reception) to give Michigan its fourth touchdown. After watching Michigan's dominating performances over the best teams in the Big Nine Conference, Walter W. Ruch wrote in The New York Times that there could not be much doubt that "Oosterbaan has fashioned perhaps the finest team in the country."
