= Pandel Savic =

American football player (1925–2018)

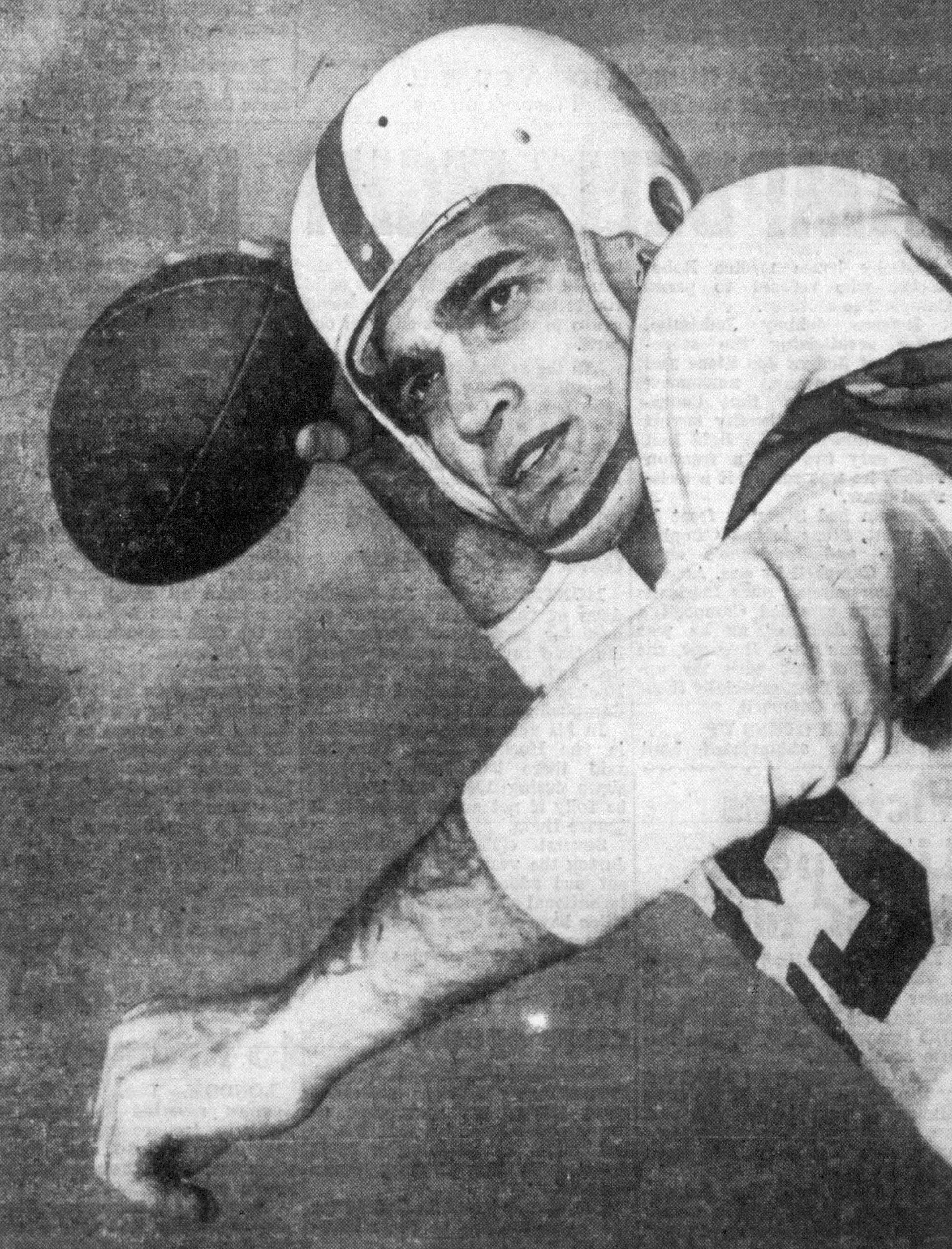
Savic, circa 1949

Pandel Savic (July 15, 1925 – June 12, 2018) was an American football player, starting at quarterback for two years with the Ohio State Buckeyes. He originated from the village of Dragoš, then in the Kingdom of Yugoslavia.

Pandel Savic came to Girard, Ohio, United States, through Ellis Island when he was a little boy. "It was the Steel Valley, and the only way to get out of there was to make it in sports," Savic said. "So I played basketball, baseball, track -- anything I could get my hands on." And so he did, he became a college football player for Ohio State. Savic joined the US Marine Corps in 1943, despite having landed a scholarship to Ohio State. He is a veteran of the Peleliu and Okinawa battles. After World War II he went to Ohio State.

He helped the 1949 Buckeyes to Ohio State's first Rose Bowl win over California, gaining 16 total yards rushing and passing, including an important 6 yards on the ground to close out the remaining time and seal the Buckeye victory. The 1949 team also won a share of the Big Ten title, with Savic throwing for 581 yards and six touchdowns on the season.

In his later life, Savic went on to play an important role in the golf community and served as longtime chairman of the PGA's Memorial Tournament which he created with his friend Jack Nicklaus. In 2009, he was inducted into the Ohio State Hall of Fame. He died on June 12, 2018, at the age of 92.
