= 1948 Notre Dame Fighting Irish football team =

American college football season

1948 Notre Dame Fighting Irish football
- Conference: Independent

Ranking
- AP: No. 2
- Record: 9–0–1
- Head coach: Frank Leahy (6th season)
- Offensive scheme: T formation
- Captain: Bill Fischer
- Home stadium: Notre Dame Stadium

1948 Midwestern major college football independents records
	Conf.			Overall
Team	W	L	T	W		L		T
No. 2 Notre Dame		–		9	–	0	–	1
Michigan State		–		6	–	2	–	2
Detroit		–		6	–	3	–	0
Marquette		–		2	–	8	–	0
Rankings from AP Poll

The 1948 Notre Dame Fighting Irish football team was an American football team that represented the University of Notre Dame as an independent during the 1948 college football season. In their sixth year under head coach Frank Leahy, the Irish compiled a 9–0–1 record, outscored opponents by a total of 320 to 93, and were ranked No. 2 in the final AP poll. In their only game against a ranked opponent, they defeated No. 8 Northwestern by a 12–7 score. In the final game of the season, they tied with unranked USC.

Three Notre Dame players were consensus first-team selections on the 1948 All-America college football team: guard and team captain Bill Fischer; end Leon Hart; and halfback Emil Sitko. In addition, guard Marty Wendell received first-team All-America honors from the American Football Coaches Association.

The team played its home games at Notre Dame Stadium in Notre Dame, Indiana.

== Schedule ==
Date	Opponent	Rank	Site	Result	Attendance	Source
September 25	Purdue		Notre Dame Stadium; Notre Dame, IN (rivalry)	W 28–27	59,343	
October 2	at Pittsburgh		Pitt Stadium; Pittsburgh, PA (rivalry)	W 40–0	63,000–64,000	
October 9	Michigan State	No. 1	Notre Dame Stadium; Notre Dame, IN (rivalry)	W 26–7	58,126	
October 16	at Nebraska	No. 2	Memorial Stadium; Lincoln, NE (rivalry)	W 44–13	38,000	
October 23	at Iowa	No. 2	Iowa Stadium; Iowa City, IA	W 27–12	53,000	
October 30	vs. Navy	No. 2	Memorial Stadium; Baltimore, MD (rivalry)	W 41–7	63,314	
November 6	at Indiana	No. 1	Memorial Stadium; Bloomington, IN	W 42–6	34,000	
November 13	No. 8 Northwestern	No. 2	Notre Dame Stadium; Notre Dame, IN (rivalry)	W 12–7	59,305	
November 27	Washington	No. 2	Notre Dame Stadium; Notre Dame, IN	W 46–0	50,609	
December 4	at USC	No. 2	Los Angeles Memorial Coliseum; Los Angeles, CA (rivalry)	T 14–14	100,571	
Rankings from AP Poll released prior to the game

== Rankings ==
Ranking movements Legend: ██ Increase in ranking ██ Decrease in ranking ( ) = First-place votes
	Week								
Poll	1	2	3	4	5	6	7	8	Final
AP	1 (50)	2 (34)	2 (23)	2 (19)	1 (56)	2 (80)	2 (27)	2 (38)	2 (97)
