= Harry Szulborski =

American football player and coach (1927–2017)

Purdue Boilermakers
- Position: Halfback

Personal information
- Born: May 23, 1927; Detroit, Michigan, U.S.
- Died: August 4, 2017; Merrillville, Indiana, U.S.
- Listed height: 5 ft 9 in (1.75 m)
- Listed weight: 175 lb (79 kg)

Career information
- High school: Pershing (Detroit)
- College: Purdue University (1946–1949)

Awards and highlights
- Third-team All-American (1947); NCAA All-American Honorable Mention (1948); First-team All-Big Ten (1947, 1948); Nation's Leading Rusher (1947); Big Ten rushing leader (1947, 1948); Senior Bowl (1950); East-West Shrine Bowl (1949); Named Purdue Football MVP (1948); Indiana Football Hall of Fame inductee (1995); Purdue Intercollegiate Hall of Fame inductee (2004); Two-Time High School 1944, 1945 ALL-STATE Selection for Football (State of Michigan); Two-time High School 1944, 1945 ALL- CITY (Detroit) Football; Voted for First Half Century Team for the city of Detroit High School Football

Harry Marion Szulborski (May 23, 1927 – August 4, 2017) was an American football player and coach.

Szulborski played college football as a halfback for Purdue University from 1946 to 1949 and was selected a first-team player on the 1947 and 1948 All-Big Nine Conference football teams. He led the conference with 631 rushing yards in 1948. He was named to the inaugural Senior Bowl He was later inducted into the Purdue Hall of Fame and Indiana Football Hall of Fame.

Szulborski was drafted 95th overall by the Green Bay Packers in the eighth round of the 1950 NFL draft but did not play for the team. He spent part of the 1951 season with his hometown Detroit Lions but did not appear in a game for them.

In the early 1950s, he became an assistant football coach at Emerson High School in Gary, Indiana. He served as the school's head football coach from 1962 to 1974 and compiled a 36–81–3 record in that position. He also served as the school's athletic director from 1960 to 1969 and 1976 to 1981.
