= Henry Hatch =

American equipment manager (1900–1964)

- Henry Hatch posing with retired football jerseys and Little Brown Jug
- Born: June 13, 1900
- Died: April 4, 1964 (aged 63); Ann Arbor, Michigan, U.S.
- Occupation(s): University of Michigan, 1919–1964

W. Henry Hatch (June 13, 1900 – April 4, 1964) was the equipment manager for the University of Michigan varsity sports programs for 43 years from 1921 to 1964. For many years, he lived with his wife and daughter in a house on the grounds of Michigan Stadium and was considered a legendary figure in Michigan sports history. The Hatch-Falk Award is named in his honor, and he was posthumously inducted into the University of Michigan Athletic Hall of Honor in 1992. Hatch is responsible for the tradition of retiring Michigan Wolverines football jerseys and is part of the lore of the Little Brown Jug.

== Michigan's equipment manager for 45 years ==
Hatch was hired as Michigan's equipment manager under legendary coach Fielding H. Yost. He held the position for 45 years until his death in 1964. He served under seven head football coaches, including Yost, Harry Kipke, Fritz Crisler and Bennie Oosterbaan. In its obituary on Hatch, the Associated Press described him as follows: "A stocky, white-haired man, Hatch was familiar to thousands of Michigan football fans as the man scampering on and off the stadium gridiron on game errands."

During his time as Michigan's equipment manager, Hatch became a legendary figure on campus. He worked out of the equipment room at Yost Arena and lived with his wife and daughter in a house on the grounds of Michigan Stadium. In a book by Jim Brandstatter published in 2002 about the stadium's history, Hatch's daughter recalled calling Michigan Stadium home 1952-1964. The house was located just outside the stadium walls but inside the fence at the south end of the stadium. Even though the football team played games there only seven or eight days a year, Hatch and his family lived on the stadium grounds 365 days a year. They watched over the stadium at night and were responsible for locking and unlocking the gates each day.

Hatch was reportedly beloved by Michigan athletes. All-American Albert Wistert told a story about Hatch's kindness to him. Wistert's older brothers, Francis "Whitey" and Alvin, had also played for Michigan, and had been All-Americans wearing the No. 11 jersey. The youngest Wistert said he never asked for the No. 11 jersey, but Hatch had saved it for him. When Wistert picked up his uniform in 1940, Hatch reached under the counter and pulled out the No. 11 jersey. Wistert later recalled, "I never needed a pep talk after that. Every time I put on that jersey, that was all I needed."

== Hatch and the tradition of retiring jerseys ==
Hatch also began the tradition of retiring jersey numbers at Michigan. The first jersey Hatch retired was the No. 47 jersey worn by Bennie Oosterbaan. After Oosterbaan graduated in the 1920s, Hatch said, "Nobody's ever going to make All-American three years running again. I'm not going to give Bennie's number out." As Tom Harmon finished his playing career at Michigan, Hatch decided Harmon's No. 98 jersey would join Oosterbaan's as the second to be retired. One newspaper reported: "Ol' 98 will be folded carefully and laid away to rest in the Michigan Niche of Fame. That is the decree announced by Henry Hatch, Ann Arbor equipment manager." And when Harmon completed his final game, the United Press reported: "The book was closed on number 98 today, and Equipment Manager Henry Hatch of Michigan university put it reverently away in a musty trunk beside number 47." The other of the four original retired numbers (see main image above) are No. 87, which belongs to Ron Kramer and No. 11, which belongs to the Wistert brothers.

== Little Brown Jug ==
As Michigan's equipment manager, Hatch played a role in the early history of the Little Brown Jug, one of the most famous trophies in college athletics. In 1903, the Michigan Wolverines traveled to Minneapolis, Minnesota, where the unbeaten Wolverines played the unbeaten Minnesota Golden Gophers. At the end of the game (a 6-6 tie), the crowd poured onto the field, and Michigan left its earthenware water jug on the field. Michigan asked to have it returned, but Minnesota refused, saying Michigan would have to win the jug back. Michigan reclaimed the jug several years later. In 1919, Minnesota beat Michigan on the Wolverines' home field in Ann Arbor. When Minnesota asked for the symbolic trophy at the end of the game, Michigan officials said they could not locate it. Eventually, Hatch came up with it. Hatch recalled, "When Minnesota made such a fuss about getting it back, I started looking around and found it behind a clump of shrubbery near the gym. I shined it up and shipped it on to Doc Cooke." Minnesota fans have long doubted Hatch's story, raising their suspicions that Hatch did not find the jug in a clump of shrubbery, but more likely "in a trophy case inside the gymnasium, easily dusted off and proudly brought back to Minnesota."

In the decades that followed, one of Hatch's jobs was to serve as the custodian of the jug during the time it was in Ann Arbor and to print each year's game score on the side of the jug. In 1953, the NEA wire service distributed a photograph of Hatch placing the score on the jug on the 50th anniversary of the first Little Brown Jug match.

== Death and honors ==
Hatch died at his Ann Arbor, Michigan home in April 1964 of a heart attack, the day after being released from the hospital for surgery on an intestinal ailment. He was survived by his wife, Wanda, and his daughter, Patricia Ann.

In 1993, Hatch was posthumously inducted into the University of Michigan Athletic Hall of Honor. As a further tribute to Hatch, the University of Michigan Club of Greater Detroit presents the "Hatch-Falk Award" each year to the university's senior manager. The award is named after Henry Hatch and his successor, Jon Falk, and provides a full tuition grant to the current Senior Manager. The Award refers to Hatch as the "legendary Equipment Manager in the early years of Michigan Athletics." Hatch was awarded an honorary varsity letter from the M Club (as W. Henry Hatch) for outstanding service to the Athletic Department.

== See also ==
- University of Michigan Athletic Hall of Honor
