= Bob Voigts =

American football, basketball player and coach

- Voigts and Northwestern center Alex Sarkisian kiss the game ball after winning the Rose Bowl in 1949.

Biographical details
- Born: March 29, 1916; Evanston, Illinois, U.S.
- Died: December 7, 2000 (aged 84); Wilmette, Illinois, U.S.

Playing career

Football
- 1936–1938: Northwestern

Basketball
- 1936–1939: Northwestern
- Position: Tackle (football)

Coaching career (HC unless noted)

Football
- 1939–1940: Illinois Wesleyan (assistant)
- 1941: Yale (line)
- 1942–1943: Great Lakes (assistant)
- 1946: Cleveland Browns (assistant)
- 1947–1954: Northwestern

Basketball
- 1939–1941: Illinois Wesleyan

Baseball
- 1940: Illinois Wesleyan

Head coaching record
- Overall: 33–39–1 (football); 25–16 (basketball)
- Bowls: 1–0

Accomplishments and honors

Awards
- First-team All-American (1938); First-team All-Big Ten (1938)

Werner Robert Voigts (March 29, 1916 – December 7, 2000) was an American football and basketball player and coach. He served as the head football coach at Northwestern University from 1947 to 1954, compiling a record of 33–39–1. Voigts led the 1948 Northwestern Wildcats team to the Rose Bowl, the first in school history, where they defeated California, 20–14.

Voigts was a native of Evanston, Illinois, where Northwestern's main campus is located. He attended Northwestern and played on the school's football team between 1936 and 1938. In his sophomore year, the Wildcats won the Big Ten Conference, and Voigts was named an All-American tackle. After college, Voigts served as an assistant football coach and head basketball coach at Illinois Wesleyan University before moving briefly to Yale University, where he was a football line coach. He entered the U.S. Navy during World War II in 1942 and was stationed outside of Chicago where he met Paul Brown, the head coach of the base's football team. When Brown became head coach of the Cleveland Browns after the war, he hired Voigts as a tackle coach. After a year with the Browns, Voigts became head coach at Northwestern.

Voigts resigned as Northwestern's head coach in 1955, citing growing criticism of his coaching after a string of losing seasons. He left football but stayed in Evanston, where he ran a real estate business for 30 years. He died in 2000.

== Early life and college ==
Voigts grew up in Evanston, Illinois, and attended Northwestern University, based in his hometown. He played tackle on the school's football team starting as a sophomore in 1936. That year, the Northwestern Wildcats posted a 7–1 win–loss record under coach Pappy Waldorf and were champions of the Big Ten Conference, a grouping of large schools from the Midwestern United States. Voigts was selected by news outlets as an All-American. He was named to an all-Big Ten squad after his senior year in 1938 and played in the College All-Star Game, a now-defunct matchup between the National Football League champions and a selection of the country's best college players. Voigts also played on Northwestern's basketball team.

== Coaching career ==
Voigts became head coach of the basketball team at Illinois Wesleyan University in 1939 and was co-coach of the football team alongside Don Heap. In two years at the school, Voigts's basketball teams posted a 25–16 win–loss record. Voigts in 1941 became a line coach for the Yale Bulldogs football team at Yale University.

After one season at Yale, Voigts entered the U.S. Navy during World War II. He was stationed at Great Lakes Naval Training Station outside of Chicago and served as a line coach on the base's Bluejackets football team from 1942 to 1943. When the war ended, Paul Brown, who had been head football coach at Great Lakes, hired Voigts as a tackle coach for the Cleveland Browns, a new team in the All-America Football Conference (AAFC) that was to start play in 1946. He joined the Browns in March 1945, making him the first assistant signed by the team.

Voigts coached tackles Lou Rymkus and Lou Groza as the Browns won the first AAFC championship in 1946. He stayed in Cleveland for only one season, however, accepting the head coaching job at Northwestern in February 1947. He signed a three-year contract, succeeding his old coach Waldorf. At 31 years old, he was one of the youngest men ever hired to coach a Big Ten football team.

Voigts spent eight seasons at Northwestern, during which his teams compiled a 33–39–1 record. This ranks him sixth all-time among Northwestern football coaches in total wins and 12th in winning percentage. His most successful year was his second season, when the Wildcats finished with an 8–2 record and won the Rose Bowl 20–14 over a University of California, Berkeley team coached by Waldorf. It was Northwestern's first-ever bowl victory and remained the only one in the school's history until the Wildcats won the 2013 Gator Bowl game in Jacksonville, Florida. Northwestern ended the season ranked seventh in the AP Poll of the best college teams in the country. Throughout his entire career at Northwestern, Voigts was an assistant coach in the College All-Star Game, a now-defunct annual matchup between the champion of the National Football League and a selection of the best college players from around the country.

While Voigts's tenure at Northwestern started successfully, he came under increasing pressure in the early 1950s after posting a string of losing records. He resigned in February 1955, citing his failure to put together winning teams. "It was just an increasing amount of criticism over my coaching, and it was probably hurting the school so I just quit", he said at the time. He said he had "no future plans" and had not considered whether he would return to pro football. He is sixth among Northwestern coaches in total wins and 12th in winning percentage. Lou Saban, a former Browns lineman who had served as assistant to Voigts, replaced him as head coach.

== Later life and death ==
Voigts stayed in Evanston after resigning and operated a real estate business out of an office across the street from Northwestern's Dyche Stadium for 30 years. He died in the Chicago suburb of Wilmette, Illinois in 2000 following a long illness. Northwestern in 2004 started the Bob Voigts Coach of the Year award, given to the best head coach at the school as selected by other coaches.

== Head coaching record ==
=== Football ===
Year	Team	Overall	Conference	Standing	Bowl/playoffs	AP^{#}
Northwestern Wildcats (Big Ten Conference) (1947–1954)
1947	Northwestern	3–6	2–4	8th		
1948	Northwestern	8–2	5–1	2nd	W Rose	7
1949	Northwestern	4–5	3–4	7th		
1950	Northwestern	6–3	3–3	5th		
1951	Northwestern	5–4	2–4	6th		
1952	Northwestern	2–6–1	2–5	T–6th		
1953	Northwestern	3–6	0–6	10th		
1954	Northwestern	2–7	1–5	T–8th		
Northwestern:		33–39–1	18–32			
Total:		33–39–1				
^{#}Rankings from final AP Poll.
