= Tenth Street Stadium =

Former stadium of Indiana University

Coordinates: 39°10′16″N 86°31′8″W

- Interactive map of Tenth Street Stadium
- Former names: Memorial Stadium (1925–1971)
- Owner: Indiana University Bloomington
- Operator: Indiana University Bloomington
- Capacity: 20,000
- Surface: Natural grass (1925–1982)

Construction
- Groundbreaking: 1922
- Opened: 1925
- Demolished: 1982
- Cost: $250,000

Tenant
- Indiana Hoosiers (NCAA) (1925–1959)

Tenth Street Stadium was a stadium in Bloomington, Indiana, United States. Originally named Memorial Stadium, it was primarily used for college football, and was the home field of the Indiana University football team between 1925 and 1959, prior to the opening of the new Memorial Stadium. The stadium held 20,000 people and was built in 1925. It replaced Jordan Field which had been the home field for the program since 1887. The stadium was renamed Tenth Street Stadium in 1971. It was later used to host the Little 500 and was used in the 1979 movie Breaking Away. The stadium was demolished in 1982 and the site on which it once stood is now a green space and recreation fields in the center of campus known as the Arboretum.
