= 1950 Big Ten Conference football season =

- Sport: American football
- Teams: 9
- Top draft pick: Chuck Ortmann
- Champion: Michigan
- Runners-up: Ohio State, Wisconsin
- Season MVP: Vic Janowicz

Football seasons
- ← 1949 1951 →

1950 Big Ten Conference football standings
	Conf.					Overall
Team	W		L		T	W		L		T
No. 9 Michigan $	4	–	1	–	1	6	–	3	–	1
No. 14 Ohio State	5	–	2	–	0	6	–	3	–	0
Wisconsin	5	–	2	–	0	6	–	3	–	0
No. 13 Illinois	4	–	2	–	0	7	–	2	–	0
Northwestern	3	–	3	–	0	6	–	3	–	0
Iowa	2	–	4	–	0	3	–	5	–	1
Minnesota	1	–	4	–	1	1	–	7	–	1
Indiana	1	–	4	–	0	3	–	5	–	1
Purdue	1	–	4	–	0	2	–	7	–	0
$ – Conference champion; Rankings from AP Poll

The 1950 Big Ten Conference football season was the 55th season of college football played by the member schools of the Big Ten Conference and was a part of the 1950 college football season.

The 1950 Michigan Wolverines football team, under head coach Bennie Oosterbaan, won the 1950 Big Ten championship with a 6–3–1 record (4–1–1 against Big Ten opponents) and was ranked No. 9 in the final AP Poll. In the last game of the regular season, Michigan defeated Ohio State, 9–3, in the Snow Bowl, played in a blizzard, at 10 degrees above zero, on an icy field, and with winds gusting over 30 miles per hour. Michigan then defeated California in the 1951 Rose Bowl. Don Dufek was selected as the team's most valuable player. Tackle Allen Wahl was a first-team All-American.

The 1950 Ohio State Buckeyes football team, under head coach Wes Fesler, compiled a 6–3 record, led the conference in scoring offense (31.8 points per game), and was ranked No. 14 in the final AP Poll. Halfback Vic Janowicz was a consensus first-team All-American and won both the Chicago Tribune Silver Football trophy as the Big Ten's most valuable player and the Heisman Trophy as the best player in college football.

The 1950 Illinois Fighting Illini football team, under head coach Ray Eliot, compiled a 7–2 record, led the conference in scoring defense (6.2 points allowed per game), and was ranked No. 13 in the final AP Poll. End Tony Klimek was selected as the team's most valuable player. Tackle Albert Tate and center Bill Vohaska both received first-team All-American honors.

== Season overview ==
=== Results and team statistics ===
Conf. Rank	Team	Head coach	AP final	AP high	Overall record	Conf. record	PPG	PAG	MVP
1	Michigan	Bennie Oosterbaan	#9	#3	6–3–1	4–1–1	15.0	11.4	Don Dufek
2	Ohio State	Wes Fesler	#14	#1	6–3	5–2	**31.8**	12.3	**Vic Janowicz**
3	Wisconsin	Ivy Williamson	NR	#15	6–3	5–2	15.1	10.8	Bob Radcliffe
4	Illinois	Ray Eliot	#13	#6	7–2	4–2	15.2	**6.2**	Tony Klimek
5	Northwestern	Bob Voigts	NR	#9	6–3	3–3	17.2	15.9	Chuck Hagmann
6	Iowa	Leonard Raffensperger	NR	#17	3–5–1	2–4	13.4	22.3	Harold Bradley
7	Minnesota	Bernie Bierman	NR	#18	1–7–1	1–4–1	8.8	21.8	Wayne Robinson
8 (tie)	Indiana	Clyde B. Smith	NR	#19	3–5–1	1–4	11.0	17.2	Bob Robertson
8 (tie)	Purdue	Stu Holcomb	NR	#9	2–7	1–4	15.9	22.2	James Janosek

Key
AP final = Team's rank in the final AP Poll of the 1950 season
AP high = Team's highest rank in the AP Poll throughout the 1950 season
PPG = Average of points scored per game
PAG = Average of points allowed per game
MVP = Most valuable player as voted by players on each team as part of the voting process to determine the winner of the Chicago Tribune Silver Football trophy; trophy winner in bold

=== Regular season ===
==== September 30 ====
On September 30, 1950, the Big Ten football teams played nine non-conference games, resulting in four wins, four losses, and one tie.

- Michigan State 14, Michigan 7
- SMU 32, Ohio State 27.
- Wisconsin 28, Marquette 6.
- Illinois 28, Ohio 2.
- Northwestern 23, Iowa State 13.
- Iowa 20, USC 14.
- Washington 28, Minnesota 13.
- Indiana 20, Nebraska 20.
- Texas 34, Purdue 26.

==== October 7 ====
On October 7, 1950, the Big Ten played two conference games and five non-conference games. The non-conference games resulted in four wins and a loss, bringing the Big Nine's non-conference record to 8–5–1.

- Michigan 27, Dartmouth 7.
- Ohio State 41, Pittsburgh 7.
- Wisconsin 7, Illinois 6.
- Northwestern 22, Navy 0.
- Indiana 20, Iowa 7.
- Nebraska 32, Minnesota 26.
- Purdue 28, Notre Dame 14.

==== October 14 ====
On October 13 and 14, 1950, the Big Ten played three conference games and three non-conference games. The non-conference games resulted in one win and two losses, bringing the Big Nine's non-conference record to 9–7–1.

- Illinois 14, UCLA 6. (Friday, October 13)
- Army 27, Michigan 6.
- Ohio State 26, Indiana 14.
- Wisconsin 14, Iowa 0.
- Northwestern 13, Minnesota 6.
- Miami (FL) 20, Purdue 14.

==== October 21 ====
On October 21, 1950, the Big Ten played three conference games and three non-conference games. The non-conference games resulted in three wins, bringing the Big Nine's non-conference record to 12–7–1.

- Michigan 26, Wisconsin 13.
- Ohio State 48, Minnesota 0.
- Illinois 20, Washington 13.
- Northwestern 28, Pittsburgh 23.
- Iowa 33, Purdue 21.
- Indiana 20, Notre Dame 7.

==== October 28 ====
On October 28, 1950, the Big Ten played four conference games and one non-conference game. The non-conference game was a loss, bringing the Big Nine's non-conference record to 12–8–1.

- Michigan 7, Minnesota 7.
- Ohio State 83, Iowa 21.
- Wisconsin 14, Northwestern 13.
- Illinois 20, Indiana 0.
- UCLA 20, Purdue 6.

==== November 4 ====
On November 4, 1950, the Big Ten played four conference games and one non-conference game. The non-conference game was a loss, bringing the Big Nine's non-conference record to 12–9–1.

- Illinois 7, Michigan 0'.
- Ohio State 32, Northwestern 0.
- Wisconsin 33, Purdue 7.
- Iowa 13, Minnesota 0.
- Michigan State 35, Indiana 0.

==== November 11 ====
On November 11, 1950, the Big Ten played four conference games and one non-conference game. The non-conference game was a loss, bringing the Big Nine's non-conference record to 12–10–1.

- Michigan 20, Indiana 7.
- Ohio State 19, Wisconsin 14.
- Illinois 21, Iowa 7.
- Northwestern 19, Purdue 14.
- Michigan State 27, Minnesota 0.

==== November 18 ====
On November 18, 1950, the Big Ten played three conference games and three non-conference games. The non-conferences game resulted in two wins and a loss, bringing the Big Nine's non-conference record to 14–11–1.

- Michigan 34, Northwestern 23.
- Illinois 14, Ohio State 7.
- Penn 20, Wisconsin 0.
- Iowa 14, Notre Dame 14.
- Minnesota 27, Purdue 14.
- Indiana 18, Marquette 7.

==== November 25 ====
On November 25, 1950, the Big Ten played four conference games and one non-conference game. The non-conference game was a loss, bringing the Big Nine's non-conference record to 14–12–1. Three of the non-conference losses were to Michigan State.

- Miami (FL) 14, Iowa 6. (Friday, November 24)
- Michigan 9, Ohio State 3.
- Wisconsin 14, Minnesota 0.
- Northwestern 14, Illinois 7.
- Purdue 13, Indiana 0.

=== Bowl games ===
- Michigan 14, California 6. On January 1, 1951, Michigan defeated California, 14–6, in the 1951 Rose Bowl. California scored on a 39-yard touchdown pass in the second quarter and led, 6–0, at the start of the fourth quarter. Michigan fullback Don Dufek, Sr. scored two rushing touchdowns in the fourth quarter and Harry Allis kicked both extra points. Dufek had 23 carries for 113 rushing yards, and Michigan halfback Chuck Ortmann completed 15 of 19 passes for 146 yards. Ortmann and Dufek were both seniors appearing in their final game for Michigan. Dufek was named the game's most valuable player. The game was the fifth consecutive victory for the Big Nine over the Pacific Coast Conference in Rose Bowl games.

== All-conference players ==
The following players were picked by the Associated Press (AP) and/or the United Press (UP) as first-team players on the 1950 All-Big Ten Conference football team.

Position	Name	Team	Selectors
Quarterback	Vic Janowicz	Ohio State	AP, UP
Halfback	Chuck Ortmann	Michigan	AP, UP
Halfback	Dick Raklovits	Illinois	AP, UP
Fullback	Don Dufek, Sr.	Michigan	AP
Fullback	Bill Reichardt	Iowa	UP
End	Tony Klimek	Illinois	AP, UP
End	Don Stonesifer	Northwestern	AP, UP
Tackle	Bill Trautwein	Ohio State	AP, UP
Tackle	Robert Wahl	Michigan	AP, UP
Guard	Chuck Brown	Illinois	AP, UP
Guard	John Biltz	Ohio State	AP, UP
Center	Bill Vohaska	Illinois	AP, UP

== All-Americans ==
At the end of the 1950 season, Big Ten players secured only one of the consensus first-team picks for the 1950 College Football All-America Team. The Big Ten's consensus All-American was:

Position	Name	Team	Selectors
Halfback	Vic Janowicz	Ohio State	AAB, AFCA, AP, FWAA, INS, TSN, UP, CP, WCFF

Other Big Ten players who were named first-team All-Americans by at least one selector were:

Position	Name	Team	Selectors
End	Don Stonesifer	Northwestern	AP
Tackle	Robert Wahl	Michigan	AAB, AP, INS
Tackle	Albert Tate	Illinois	FWAA
Guard	Bob Momsen	Ohio State	FWAA
Center	Bill Vohaska	Illinois	AP
Center	Bob McCullough	Ohio State	AFCA

== 1951 NFL draft ==
The following Big Ten players were among the first 100 picks in the 1951 NFL draft:

Name	Position	Team	Round	Overall pick
Chuck Ortmann	Running back	Michigan	2	20
Don Stonesifer	End	Northwestern	3	30
Barry "Bear" French	Tackle	Purdue	4	45
Lynn Lynch	Guard	Illinois	5	51
Tony Momsen	Center	Michigan	5	59
Bob Momsen	Tackle	Ohio	7	80
Dick Raklovits	Back	Illinois	8	91
Dick McWilliams	Tackle	Michigan	9	99
