= 1950 All-Big Ten Conference football team =

American college football all-star team

The 1950 All-Big Ten Conference football team consists of American football players chosen by various organizations for All-Big Ten Conference teams for the 1950 Big Nine Conference football season. The selectors for the 1950 season were the Associated Press (AP), based on a vote of the conference coaches, and the United Press (UP). Players selected as first-team players by both the AP and UP are designated in bold.

Michigan captured the Big Ten championship, was ranked #9 in the final AP Poll, defeated California in the 1951 Rose Bowl, and placed three of its players on one or both of the first teams. Michigan's honorees were halfback Chuck Ortmann, fullback Don Dufek, and tackle Robert Wahl.

Illinois compiled a 7–2 record and a #13 ranking in the final AP Poll and had four players selected as first-team honorees. The Illinois first-team honorees were halfback Dick Raklovits, end Tony Klimek, center Bill Vohaska and guard Chuck Brown.

Ohio State compiled a 6–3 record and a #14 ranking in the final AP Poll and placed four players on the first team. The Ohio State first-team honorees were quarterback and 1950 Heisman Trophy winner Vic Janowicz, tackle Bill Trautwein, and guard John Biltz

== All Big-Ten selections ==
=== Quarterbacks ===
- **Vic Janowicz**, Ohio State (AP-1; UP-1)
- Tony Curcillo, Ohio State (AP-2)
- Dick Flowers, Northwestern (UP-2)

=== Halfbacks ===
- **Chuck Ortmann**, Michigan (AP-1; UP-1)
- **Dick Raklovits**, Illinois (AP-1; UP-1)
- Johnny Karras, Illinois (AP-2; UP-2)
- Walt Klevay, Ohio State (AP-2; UP-2)

=== Fullbacks ===
- Don Dufek, Sr., Michigan (AP-1; UP-2)
- Bill Reichardt, Iowa (AP-2; UP-1)

=== Ends ===
- **Tony Klimek**, Illinois (AP-1; UP-1)
- **Don Stonesifer**, Northwestern (AP-1; UP-1)
- Leo Sugar, Purdue (AP-2; UP-2)
- Thomas G. Watson, Ohio State (AP-2)
- Cliff Anderson, Indiana (UP-2)

=== Tackles ===
- **Bill Trautwein**, Ohio State (AP-1; UP-1)
- **Robert Wahl**, Michigan (AP-1; UP-1)
- Ken Huxhold, Wisconsin (AP-2; UP-2)
- Al Tate, Illinois (AP-2; UP-2)

=== Guards ===
- **Charles E. "Chuck" Brown**, Illinois (AP-1; UP-1)
- **John Biltz**, Ohio State (AP-1; UP-1)
- Lynn Lynch, Illinois (AP-2; UP-2)
- John Simcic, Wisconsin (AP-2; UP-2)

=== Centers ===
- **Bill Vohaska**, Illinois (AP-1; UP-1)
- Tony Momsen, Michigan (AP-2; UP-2)

== Key ==
AP = Associated Press, chosen by conference coaches

UP = United Press

Bold = Consensus first-team selection of both the AP and UP

== See also ==
- 1950 College Football All-America Team
