= Don Dufek =

American football player (born 1954)

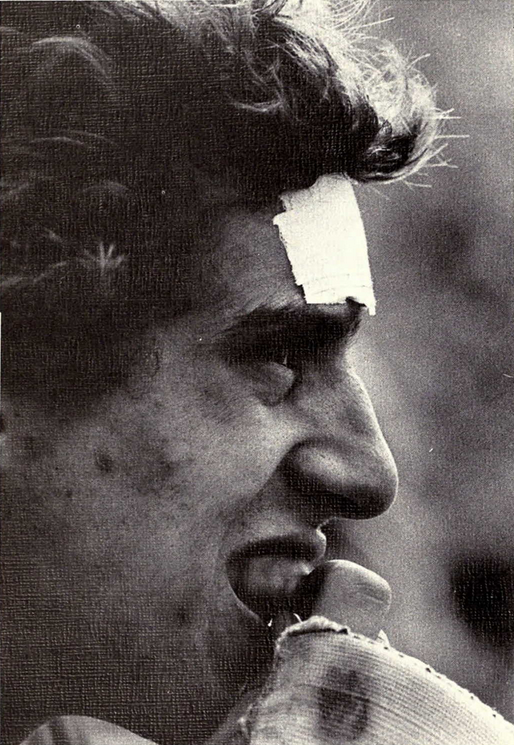
- Dufek from 1974 Michiganensian

No. 25, 35
- Position: S/KR

Personal information
- Born: April 28, 1954 (age 72); Ann Arbor, Michigan, U.S.
- Listed height: 6 ft 0 in (1.83 m)
- Listed weight: 195 lb (88 kg)

Career information
- High school: Pioneer (MI)
- College: Michigan
- NFL draft: 1976: 5th round, 126th overall pick

Career history
- Seattle Seahawks (1976–1984)

Awards and highlights
- First-team All-American (1975); 2× First-team All-Big Ten (1974, 1975)

Career NFL statistics
- Quarterback sacks: 2.0
- Interceptions: 3
- Fumble recoveries: 2
- Stats at Pro Football Reference

Donald Patrick Dufek Jr. (born April 28, 1954) is an American former professional football player who was a safety and special teamer for eight seasons with the Seattle Seahawks of the National Football League (NFL). He played college football for the Michigan Wolverines from 1973 to 1975. He was chosen to serve as team captain for both the Seahawks and Wolverines.

At the University of Michigan, he was following in the footsteps of his father Don Dufek Sr. who had been a Wolverine team Most Valuable Player. As a graduate of Pioneer High School in Ann Arbor, Dufek was able to stay close to home while performing as a two-sport star at the University of Michigan, where he played for the Wolverines football and hockey teams. In football, he was a member of back-to-back Big Ten Conference championship teams at Michigan and became an All-American as well as a team captain.

Dufek, was sought after as a professional athlete in two sports: Dufek was selected by teams in the National Hockey League, World Hockey Association and National Football League. He opted for football and played his entire professional career with the Seahawks. He endured several unsuccessful seasons in Seattle, but the team made the playoffs in his final two years. In his role as a special teams player, he again became a team captain.

== Early life ==
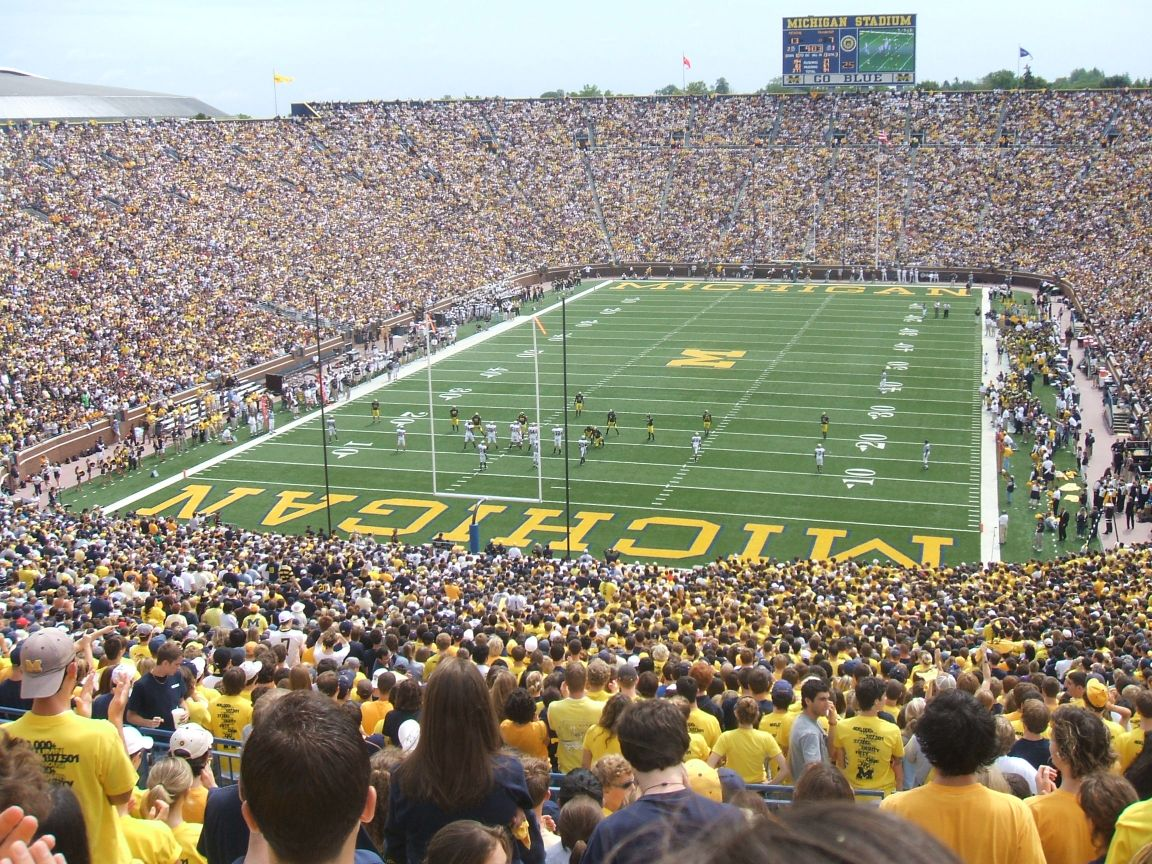
Dufek grew up attending games at Michigan Stadium.

Dufek grew up in Ann Arbor, the son of former fullback, Don Dufek Sr., who was named Most Valuable Player of the 1950 Michigan Wolverines football team and the MVP of the 1951 Rose Bowl. In 1971, Dufek played linebacker for Ann Arbor Pioneer High School and was one of only three unanimous picks for the major All-State football teams in the State of Michigan, as selected by the United Press International (UPI), Associated Press (AP), and Detroit Free Press. The coach of Pioneer's cross-town rival Huron High School said of Dufek in 1971: "He's the best I've seen."

In a 2003 interview with the Grand Rapids Press, Dufek recalled growing up in Ann Arbor and meeting his father's Michigan teammates. "Living in Ann Arbor, and seeing all the things that embody a great university, you learned that there were highly successful people in athletics, and it just made you want to feel a part of it. Then, as you got older, and you got more deeply involved in the game yourself, you just hoped that you had a chance to play in college -- and after watching all those games at Michigan Stadium, that maybe Michigan would take a chance on you."

== College career ==
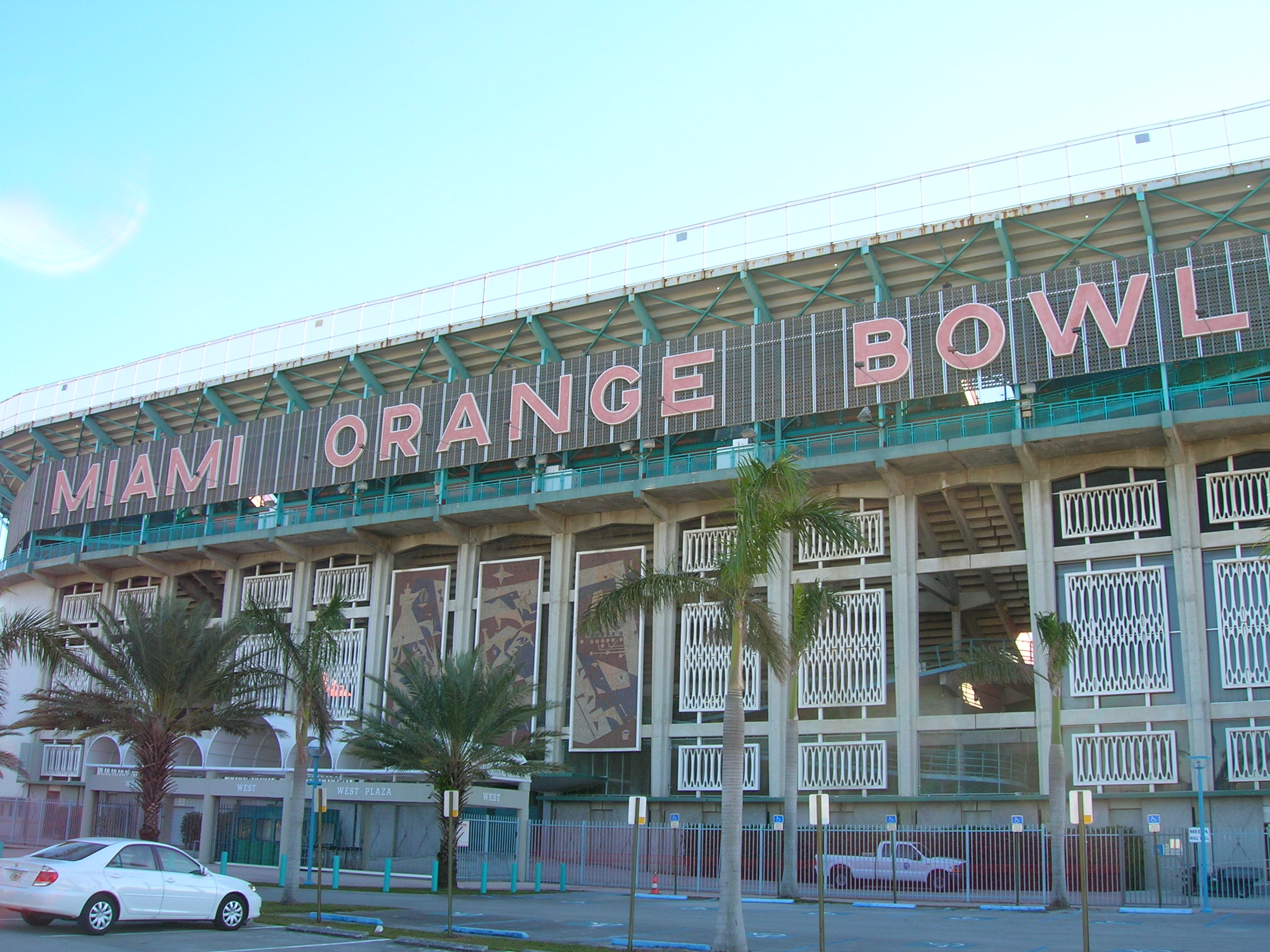
Dufek's only bowl game was in the 1976 Orange Bowl.

=== Football ===
Michigan provided Dufek with the opportunity that he had hoped for. He played defensive back for the Wolverines from 1973 to 1975 and was named a team co-captain and an All-American as a member of the 1975 Wolverines team. He was chosen as a first-team All-American by the Football Writers Association of America, and the Walter Camp Football Foundation, and as a second-team All-American by UPI. Twice named an All-Big Ten safety, Dufek had 249 tackles, nine fumble recoveries and four interceptions for the Wolverines. Although the 1973 and 1974 Michigan teams were Big Ten co-champions, the Ohio State Buckeyes advanced to the Rose Bowl both years, and Dufek's only bowl game appearance was in a 14–6 loss to the Oklahoma in the 1976 Orange Bowl.

=== Hockey ===
In addition to receiving three varsity letters in football, Dufek also received four letters as a left wing for the Michigan Wolverines hockey team. Dufek played with the hockey team only after the football season ended, and he managed to score about 10 goals a year in the shortened seasons he played. Dufek made a sufficiently solid showing in his freshman and sophomore years at Michigan that the Detroit Red Wings selected him in the sixth round of the 1974 NHL amateur draft. He was also drafted by the Minnesota Fighting Saints of the World Hockey Association with the 162nd overall selection in the eleventh round of the 1974 WHA Amateur Draft.

In a 1975 interview, Dufek noted his love of both sports: "There are times when I've thought of dropping one or the other, but heck, I've been doing this since high school and it would be pretty tough to quit them both now." Dufek added: "Hockey is a more relaxed thing. It's a smaller atmosphere and you have to deal with only one or two coaches. You can be more individual and flashy. Football has certain assignments and you can't really express yourself." In the end, however, Dufek chose the NFL over the NHL. He explained: "I've decided to pursue professional football because I would probably have an extensive tour in the hockey minor leagues and I don't want that."

== Professional career ==
Dufek was selected by the Seahawks with the second selection of fifth round and 126th overall selection of the 1976 NFL draft. Dufek was one of the original Seahawks in 1976, the franchise's first year in the NFL, and he played for them until 1984. He was the captain of the Seahawks' special teams units in 1981 and 1982. During both of these seasons he was co-captain along with eventual Pro Football Hall of Famer and four-term representative in United States House of Representatives, Steve Largent, the captain of the offensive unit and Keith Simpson, captain of the defensive unit. Over the course of his career he had three interceptions, two quarterback sacks, a fumble recovery and thirteen kickoff returns. Sportswriter Richard Kucner once wrote: "Don Dufek was the kind of guy who just won't take 'No' for an answer. He was released in training camp four times during his eight-year Seahawks career. But each time, Seattle had a change of heart, bringing him back. Today, he is remembered as one of the best special teams performers the team has had."

After numerous seasons under Jack Patera from 1976 to 1982 and interim coach Mike McCormack in 1982, the Seahawks finally reached the playoffs in Dufek's final two seasons under Chuck Knox. During the 1983 NFL season, the Seahawks went 9–7 and reached the AFC Championship Game where they lost to the Oakland Raiders. Then, during the 1984 NFL season, the Seahawks went 12–4 and failed to reach the Conference Championships during the 1984–85 Playoffs.

Dufek was interviewed by the Ann Arbor News in 2006 about life in Seattle. He said: "It's a bigger version of Ann Arbor. It's overcast, and it's green and clean." And there's the coffee. "It's really comical," says Dufek of all the coffee stops in Seattle. "Even the gas stations have coffee bars."

== Personal life ==
Dufek now lives in Ann Arbor with his wife Candi Dufek. Dufek ran his own construction company, Dufek Wolverine Construction. In December 2006, the Detroit Free Press did a feature about the Dufek family and their big U-M tailgate parties. The article noted: "It's hard to get more maize and blue than the Dufek family. Candy Dufek met Donnie Dufek in the first grade in Ann Arbor, and cheered as he played under Bo Schembechler in the 1970s. Younger brother, Bill also played for U-M from 1974 to 1978, also attaining All-American status. Their younger brother Joe, however, played for Yale (as well as pro ball as a quarterback for the Buffalo Bills and San Diego Chargers). They are the sons of legendary U-M Hall of Famer, Don Dufek Sr., who scored two touchdowns in U-M's 1951 Rose Bowl win." Dufek has two children, Jacqueline and Frank.
