= 1950 Illinois Fighting Illini football team =

American college football season

1950 Illinois Fighting Illini football
- Conference: Big Ten Conference

Ranking
- Coaches: No. 11
- AP: No. 13
- Record: 7–2 (4–2 Big Ten)
- Head coach: Ray Eliot (9th season)
- MVP: Tony Klimek
- Captain: Bill Vohaska
- Home stadium: Memorial Stadium

1950 Big Ten Conference football standings
	Conf.					Overall
Team	W		L		T	W		L		T
No. 9 Michigan $	4	–	1	–	1	6	–	3	–	1
No. 14 Ohio State	5	–	2	–	0	6	–	3	–	0
Wisconsin	5	–	2	–	0	6	–	3	–	0
No. 13 Illinois	4	–	2	–	0	7	–	2	–	0
Northwestern	3	–	3	–	0	6	–	3	–	0
Iowa	2	–	4	–	0	3	–	5	–	1
Minnesota	1	–	4	–	1	1	–	7	–	1
Indiana	1	–	4	–	0	3	–	5	–	1
Purdue	1	–	4	–	0	2	–	7	–	0
$ – Conference champion; Rankings from AP Poll

The 1950 Illinois Fighting Illini football team was an American football team that represented the University of Illinois as a member of the Big Nine Conference during the 1950 Big Nine season. In their ninth year under head coach Ray Eliot, the Fighting Illini compiled a 7–2 record (4–2 in conference games), finished in fourth place in the Big Nine, and outscored opponents by a total of 137 to 56. They were ranked No. 13 in the final AP poll. The lone setbacks were losses Wisconsin and Northwestern.

End Tony Klimek was selected as the team's most valuable player. Seven Illinois players received honors on the 1950 All-Big Ten Conference football team: halfback Dick Raklovits (AP-1, UP-1); end Tony Klimek (AP-1, UP-1); guard Chuck Brown (AP-1, UP-1); center Bill Vohaska (AP-1, UP-1); halfback Johnny Karras (AP-2, UP-2); tackle Al Tate (AP-2, UP-2); and guard Lynn Lynch (AP-2, UP-2).

The team played its home games at Memorial Stadium in Champaign, Illinois.

== Schedule ==
Date	Opponent	Rank	Site	Result	Attendance
September 30	Ohio*	No. 8	Memorial Stadium; Champaign, IL	W 28–2	
October 7	Wisconsin	No. 15	Memorial Stadium; Champaign, IL	L 6–7	54,230
October 13	at UCLA*		Los Angeles Memorial Coliseum; Los Angeles, CA	W 14–6	45,619
October 21	No. 10 Washington*		Memorial Stadium; Champaign, IL	W 20–13	35,930
October 28	No. 19 Indiana	No. 12	Memorial Stadium; Champaign, IL (rivalry)	W 20–0	65,021
November 4	at Michigan	No. 10	Michigan Stadium; Ann Arbor, MI (rivalry)	W 7–0	96,517–96,577
November 11	at Iowa	No. 10	Iowa Stadium; Iowa City, IA	W 21–7	45,104
November 18	No. 1 Ohio State	No. 8	Memorial Stadium; Champaign, IL (Illibuck)	W 14–7	71,119
November 25	at Northwestern	No. 6	Dyche Stadium; Evanston, IL (rivalry)	L 7–14	50,000
*Non-conference game; Rankings from AP Poll released prior to the game

== Players ==
- Charles E. "Chuck" Brown - guard (1st-team All-Big Ten pick by AP and UP)
- Johnny Karras - halfback (2nd-team All-Big Ten pick by AP and UP)
- Tony Klimek - end (1st-team All-Big Ten pick by AP and UP)
- Lynn Lynch - guard (2nd-team All-Big Ten pick by AP and UP)
- Dick Raklovits - halfback (1st-team All-Big Ten pick by AP and UP)
- Al Tate - tackle (1st-team All-America pick by Football Writers; 2nd-team All-Big Ten pick by AP and UP)
- Bill Vohaska - center (1st-team All-America pick by AP; 1st-team All-Big Ten pick by AP and UP)
