= Robert Wahl =

American football player (1927–2023)

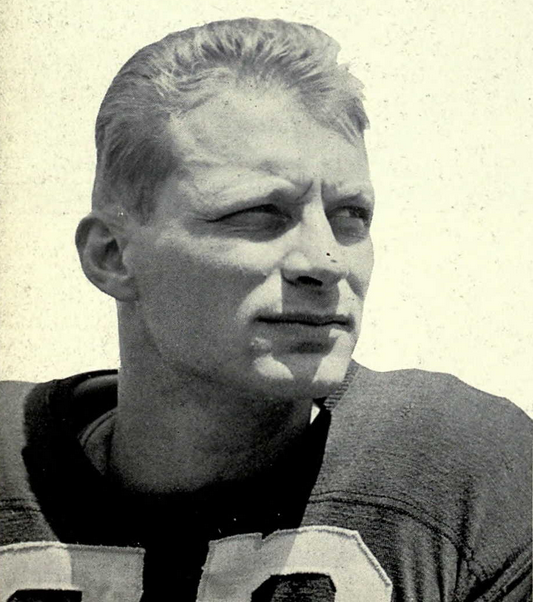

Profile
- Position: T

Personal information
- Born: November 7, 1927; Oak Park, Illinois, U.S.
- Died: December 17, 2023 (aged 96); Dallas, Texas, U.S.
- Listed height: 6 ft 3 in (1.91 m)
- Listed weight: 225 lb (102 kg)

Career information
- College: Michigan
- NFL draft: 1949: 16th round, 159th overall pick

Awards and highlights
- National champion (1948); 2× First-team All-American (1949, 1950); First-team All-Big Ten (1950); Second-team All-Big Nine (1949)

Robert Allen Wahl (November 7, 1927 – December 17, 2023), nicknamed "Brick" Wahl, was a football player who was a two-time All-American for the University of Michigan Wolverines in 1949 and 1950. Wahl was also a U.S. Army heavyweight boxing champion (European theater) who went on to become the president of a Fortune 500 company, Valmont Industries.

== All-American at the University of Michigan ==
=== Freshman year and military service ===
Wahl went to high school in Oak Park, Illinois and played for the Wolverines as a freshman in 1945. He played as a 17-year-old under wartime rules but injuries handicapped him. One news report noted: "A 17-year-old lad with a great high school reputation he was touted as a regular starter before the '45 season opened. But an ankle injury sidelined him and it also shook his confidence."

Wahl missed the 1946 and 1947 seasons due to service in the U.S. Army in Germany. While serving in the Army, Wahl became the Army's heavyweight boxing champion in occupied Germany with 14 knockouts in 17 bouts. Wahl said he took up boxing to keep in shape and found that boxing "not only developed him physically, but it gave him the quickness with his hands and taught him footwork."

=== 1948 season ===
As a sophomore, Wahl played for the undefeated 1948 Michigan Wolverines team that won the National Championship. In Bennie Oosterbaan's first year as head coach, the Wolverines outscored their opponents, 252–44.

=== 1949 season ===
In 1949, Michigan had two All-Americans at tackle, with Wahl being named All-American at right tackle and teammate Alvin Wistert getting the nod at left tackle. With Wahl and Wistert leading the way, the 1949 Wolverines went 6-2-1, finished in a tie for the Big Ten Conference football championship, and were ranked #2 in the final Associated Press poll.

The 1950 Michigan yearbook, called the Michiganensian, had a full-page profile of Wahl and noted: "Two years of steady performance as one of the nation's outstanding tackles paid off in All-American honors for Al 'Brick' Wahl last season. Captain elect of the '50 squad, the 215-pounder lifted the Wolverines out of their mid-season slump in the upset over Minnesota. He was brilliant in the closing battle with the Buckeye's, a 7-7 game that tied the Maize and Blue for the Big Ten championship."

=== 1950 season and Rose Bowl ===
As a senior in 1950, Wahl was named team captain and was the Wolverines' lone All-American selection. The team won the Big Ten championship and played in the 1951 Rose Bowl, defeating the University of California, 14–6. The Wolverines had failed to score at half-time when press accounts following the game reported that Wahl's halftime speech inspired the team: "Giant Al Wahl, a 220 pound tackle who played a whale of a game on the field, was credited today with providing the spark that won the Rose Bowl game for Michigan ... Badly battered through the first half and trailing the California Bears, 6-0, at the intermission, team captain Wahl stood before his mates as they rested at halftime and told them of Michigan's winning tradition." Coach Oosterbaan noted that he didn't say anything at halftime: "Al Wahl did it for us." The speech apparently worked, as Michigan scored 14 points in the second half and held the Bears scoreless.

=== A key blocked punt in the "Snow Bowl" ===
In the 1950 season, Wahl played a key role in the famed Snow Bowl game against Ohio State on November 25, 1950. The Snow Bowl was played in Columbus in a blizzard, at 10 degrees above zero, on an icy field, and with wind gusting over 30 miles per hour. Michigan defeated the Buckeyes without gaining a single first down or completing a pass, and despite punting 24 times and gaining 27 yards of total offense. Both Michigan scores came off blocked punts, one resulting in a safety and the other in a touchdown. Wahl was responsible for the safety, blocking a punt by OSU's Heisman Trophy winner Vic Janowicz. The Michigan Daily reported the next day on Wahl's block: "In tallying the safety it was Michigan's captain Al Wahl, who crashed in Janowicz' well-exercised kicking leg. The ball bounced erratically to the right of the onrushing Maize and Blue lineman and was floundering less than a foot outside the end zone border when speedy Al Jackson caught up with it. Six inches closer and the Wolverines could have added six more points."

=== Three straight championships and the NFL draft ===
Wahl also played in the 1951 All-Star Game.

Between 1948 and 1950, Wahl played for teams that won three consecutive Big Ten Conference football championships and had a record of 21-5-2.

Wahl was eligible for the 1949 NFL draft, and was selected 159th overall by the Chicago Bears in the 16th round, but opted to stay at Michigan for the 1949 and 1950 seasons and earn his degree. He then served two more years with the Army upon graduation. A 1951 newspaper account reported on Wahl's return to the Army: "Al Wahl, captain of the 1950 University of Michigan football team, has been called for Army service early next month ... Wahl, who comes from Oak Park, Ill. is the second ex-Wolverine grid start to be called by the Army."

=== A recovered memento ===
In 1981, The New York Times published an article about Wahl's recovery of an inscribed watch that was a memento of Michigan's victory in the 1951 Rose Bowl. Wahl reported that he lost the watch during a street fight in Chicago in 1953, while he was running an Army prison at Fort Sheridan, Illinois. He said: "We got into a little fight. I didn't miss the watch until I was back in the car and headed to the fort." Asked who won the fight, Wahl said: "I'd like to think we did. During my time in the Army, I was also the European golden gloves heavyweight champ." A local newspaper in Missouri tracked down Wahl through the University of Michigan alumni office. The newspaper found that Wahl worked for Valmont Industries in Omaha, Nebraska and called the company. The reporter asked: "Do you have a Mr. Wahl working there and would it be possible for him to come to the phone?" "I suppose so," the secretary said. "He's the president."

=== Honors and awards ===
In 2004, Wahl was inducted into the University of Michigan's Hall of Honor. In 2005, Wahl was selected as one of the 100 greatest Michigan football players of all time by the "Motown Sports Revival," ranking 32nd on the all-time team.

== Business career ==
Wahl spent twenty years with Valmont Industries, a company that manufactures irrigation equipment. He joined the company in 1965 as a vice president of marketing and was named president of the company in 1977. He served as the company's president and chief operating officer until 1985, and helped build it into a Fortune 500 company. In 1987, Wahl acquired a $60-million sales distribution company serving a 20-state market. After restructuring the company and making strategic acquisitions, he negotiated a sale of the company to a British conglomerate.

From 1991, Wahl was an independent consultant. He also served as an Executive Vice President of DreamScape Development Group, Inc., a group involved in the development of the Las Vegas Domed Stadium Project, a proposed 80,000 seat domed sports stadium.

From 1997, Wahl was an independent business consultant and director of Phazar Corp., a company in Mineral Wells, Texas that makes antennas, wireless mesh network solutions and other products.

== Death ==
Wahl died on December 17, 2023, at the age of 96.

== See also ==
- 1950 Michigan Wolverines football team
- University of Michigan Athletic Hall of Honor
