= 1950 Michigan Wolverines football team =

American college football season

1950 Michigan Wolverines football

Big Ten champion Rose Bowl champion

Rose Bowl, W 14–6 vs. California
- Conference: Big Ten Conference

Ranking
- Coaches: No. 6
- AP: No. 9
- Record: 6–3–1 (4–1–1 Big Ten)
- Head coach: Bennie Oosterbaan (3rd season)
- MVP: Don Dufek Sr.
- Captain: Robert Wahl
- Home stadium: Michigan Stadium

1950 Big Ten Conference football standings
	Conf.					Overall
Team	W		L		T	W		L		T
No. 9 Michigan $	4	–	1	–	1	6	–	3	–	1
No. 14 Ohio State	5	–	2	–	0	6	–	3	–	0
Wisconsin	5	–	2	–	0	6	–	3	–	0
No. 13 Illinois	4	–	2	–	0	7	–	2	–	0
Northwestern	3	–	3	–	0	6	–	3	–	0
Iowa	2	–	4	–	0	3	–	5	–	1
Minnesota	1	–	4	–	1	1	–	7	–	1
Indiana	1	–	4	–	0	3	–	5	–	1
Purdue	1	–	4	–	0	2	–	7	–	0
$ – Conference champion; Rankings from AP Poll

The 1950 Michigan Wolverines football team was an American football team that represented the University of Michigan in the 1950 Big Ten Conference football season. Coached by Bennie Oosterbaan, the Wolverines won the Big Ten Conference championship with a record of 6–3–1 (4–1–1 in conference) and defeated California in the 1951 Rose Bowl, 14–6. The team had two All-Big 10 backs in Don Dufek and Chuck Ortmann and All-American tackle R. Allen "Brick" Wahl. Despite losing three times and tying once, Michigan was ranked No. 9 in the AP Poll and No. 6 in the UPI Poll at season's end. The Wolverines played a regular season game at Yankee Stadium against Army on October 14, 1950. They lost that game 27–6.

== Schedule ==
Date	Opponent	Rank	Site	Result	Attendance
September 30	No. 19 Michigan State*	No. 3	Michigan Stadium; Ann Arbor, MI (rivalry)	L 7–14	96,602
October 7	Dartmouth*	No. 19	Michigan Stadium; Ann Arbor, MI	W 27–7	70,262
October 14	vs. No. 1 Army*	No. 18	Yankee Stadium; Bronx, NY	L 6–27	61,472
October 21	No. 16 Wisconsin^{†}		Michigan Stadium; Ann Arbor, MI	W 26–13	88,657
October 28	at Minnesota	No. 14	Memorial Stadium; Minneapolis, MN (Little Brown Jug)	T 7–7	59,412
November 4	No. 10 Illinois		Michigan Stadium; Ann Arbor, MI (rivalry)	L 0–7	96,517
November 11	Indiana		Michigan Stadium; Ann Arbor, MI	W 20–7	65,754
November 18	Northwestern		Michigan Stadium; Ann Arbor, MI (rivalry)	W 34–23	75,075
November 25	at No. 8 Ohio State		Ohio Stadium; Columbus, OH (rivalry, Snow Bowl)	W 9–3	79,868
January 1, 1951	vs. No. 5 California*	No. 9	Rose Bowl; Pasadena, CA (Rose Bowl)	W 14–6	98,939
*Non-conference game; ^{†}Homecoming; Rankings from AP Poll released prior to the game

== Game summaries ==
=== Week 1: Michigan State ===
Week 1: Michigan State at Michigan

Team	1	2	3	4	Total
• Michigan St.	7	0	0	7	14
Michigan	0	0	7	0	7

- Date: September 30, 1950
- Location: Michigan Stadium
  Ann Arbor, MI
- Game attendance: 97,239

Michigan, ranked No. 3 in the country, opened the 1950 season playing against Michigan State College in Ann Arbor. Though favored by two touchdowns, the Wolverines were upset by the Spartans 14-7. The defeat was Michigan's first loss in the opening game of a season since 1937. Michigan played most of the game without its leading player, Chuck Ortmann. Ortmann was injured while being tackled on a 35-yard kickoff return in the first quarter. On the next play, Ortmann dropped back to pass but fell to the ground and was unable to return to the game. Michigan State took a 7-0 lead in the first quarter on a touchdown run by Sonny Grandelius. Michigan tied the score in the third quarter on a touchdown pass from Don Peterson to Fred Pickard. Michigan's touchdown was set up when Frank Howell intercepted a Michigan State pass and returned it 32 yards to the Michigan State 20-yard line. In the fourth quarter, Michigan State returned a punt to the Michigan 19-yard line and scored on a run by Michigan State fullback Leroy Crane. Michigan drove to the Michigan State 10-yard line in the fourth quarter, but the drive ended when quarterback Bill Putich threw an interception.

=== Week 2: Dartmouth ===
Week 2: Dartmouth at Michigan

Team	1	2	3	4	Total
Dartmouth	7	0	0	0	7
• Michigan	6	7	14	0	27

- Date: October 7, 1950
- Location: Michigan Stadium
  Ann Arbor, MI
- Game attendance: 70,262
- Referee: Mike Layden

Michigan rebounded in the second week of the season with a 27-7 win over Dartmouth at Michigan Stadium. Dartmouth scored first with a touchdown pass from Johnny Clayton to John McDonald. Leo Koceski scored Michigan's first touchdown on 36-yard end run in the first quarter. Sophomore Lowell Perry caught a 21-yard touchdown pass from Bill Putich near the end of the first half to give Michigan a 13-7 lead at halftime. Perry also had three interceptions on defense. Michigan scored two touchdowns in the third quarter, one on a long pass from Don Peterson to Harry Allis. The final touchdown came after Tony Momsen recovered a blocked punt at the Dartmouth two-yard line. Fullback Ralph Staffon ran for the touchdown.

=== Week 3: vs. Army ===
Week 3: Michigan vs. Army

Team	1	2	3	4	Total
Michigan	6	0	0	0	6
• Army	0	6	7	14	27

- Date: October 14, 1950
- Location: Yankee Stadium
  New York, NY
- Game attendance: 61,472

In the third game of the 1950 season, Michigan faced an Army team that was ranked No. 1 in the AP and Coaches' Polls at Yankee Stadium in New York. The two teams played to a 6-6 tie at halftime, but Army shut out the Wolverines 21-0 in the second half for a final score of 27-6. The game marked the 23rd consecutive victory by Army. Chuck Ortmann threw for 118 yards, and Don Dufek gained 66 yards on the ground and scored Michigan's one touchdown.

=== Week 4: Wisconsin ===
Week 4: Wisconsin at Michigan

Team	1	2	3	4	Total
Wisconsin	0	0	0	13	13
• Michigan	7	7	12	0	26

- Date: October 21, 1950
- Location: Michigan Stadium
  Ann Arbor, MI
- Game attendance: 91,202

In the fourth game of the season, Michigan played Wisconsin in Ann Arbor. Michigan came into the game unranked with a 1-2 record, while Wisconsin was undefeated and ranked No. 15 in the Coaches' Poll. Chuck Ortmann ran 16 yards for a touchdown in the first quarter and threw a 29-yard touchdown pass to Bill Putich in the second quarter to give Michigan a 14-0 lead at halftime. Don Dufek ran one yard for a touchdown in the third quarter. Dufek scored Michigan's final touchdown after intercepting a pass thrown by Wisconsin quarterback Bob Petruska. In the fourth quarter, Wisconsin closed the gap, scoring two touchdowns while playing against Michigan's reserves.

=== Week 5: at Minnesota ===
Week 5: Michigan at Minnesota

Team	1	2	3	4	Total
Michigan	0	0	7	0	7
Minnesota	0	0	0	7	7

- Date: October 28, 1950
- Location: Memorial Stadium
  Minneapolis, MN
- Game attendance: 60,158

In its fifth game, Michigan traveled to Minneapolis to play Minnesota. After a scoreless first half, Michigan drove down the field culminating in a two-yard run by Don Dufek. Minnesota tied the game with a touchdown in the final two minutes to tie the game at 7-7. Dufek rushed for 63 yards, but the Minnesota team held Michigan to a total of only 46 yards rushing as Chuck Ortmann was held to -38 rushing yards. With the tie game, Michigan retained possession of the Little Brown Jug.

=== Week 6: Illinois ===
Week 6: Illinois at Michigan

Team	1	2	3	4	Total
• Illinois	0	7	0	7	14
Michigan	0	0	0	0	0

- Date: November 4, 1950
- Location: Michigan Stadium
  Ann Arbor, MI
- Game attendance: 96,517

In the sixth game of the year, Michigan played Illinois in a swirling snowstorm at Michigan Stadium. The cold temperature and slippery playing surface kept the offensive units of both teams in check. Chuck Ortmann went 0 for 11 passing, and the Michigan offense was limited to 119 yards of total offense—all gained on the ground. Because of the inclement weather, the game was reduced to a punting duel between Don Laz of Illinois and Tony Momsen of Michigan. There were 25 punts in the game, 14 by Michigan and 11 by Illinois. Near the end of the first half, Illinois put together the only sustained drive of the game. Starting at its own 20-yard line, Illinois drove 80 yards for the game's only touchdown, converting on a ten-yard pass from Fred Major to Tony Klimek.

=== Week 7: Indiana ===
Week 7: Indiana at Michigan

Team	1	2	3	4	Total
Indiana	0	0	7	0	7
• Michigan	6	7	7	0	20

- Date: November 11, 1950
- Location: Michigan Stadium
  Ann Arbor, MI
- Game attendance: 67,379

In the seventh game of the season, Michigan defeated Indiana 20-7 at Michigan Stadium. Michigan scored on the third play of the game when Harry Allis intercepted a pass thrown by Lou D'Achille and returned it 33 yards for a touchdown. The Wolverines' offense received help from an unexpected source in Wes Bradford, a 155-pound, fifth-string scatback from Troy, Ohio. Bradford rushed for 105 yards on 15 carries and scored his first career touchdown on a 41-yard run in the second quarter. Don Dufek scored Michigan's final touchdown on a 54-yard run on the first running play of the second half.

=== Week 8: Northwestern ===
Week 8: Northwestern at Michigan

Team	1	2	3	4	Total
Northwestern	0	9	0	14	23
• Michigan	13	7	7	7	34

- Date: November 18, 1950
- Location: Michigan Stadium
  Ann Arbor, MI
- Game attendance: 78,201

In the eighth game of the season, Michigan had its biggest offensive output of the year, defeating Northwestern 34-23 at Michigan Stadium. Having averaged only 13 points a game in the first seven-game, Michigan scored in touchdowns in all four quarters against the Wildcats. Michigan's offense was led by a running game that gained 291 net yards, including 110 yards from Don Dufek and 76 yards from Ralph Straffon. Dufek scored two touchdowns and also intercepted a Dick Flowers' pass.

=== Week 9: at Ohio State (Snow Bowl) ===
Week 9: Michigan at Ohio State

Team	1	2	3	4	Total
• Michigan	2	7	0	0	9
Ohio State	3	0	0	0	3

- Date: November 28, 1950
- Location: Ohio Stadium
  Columbus, OH
- Game attendance: 50,303
- Game weather: Blizzard

The 1950 team is probably most remembered for its 9–3 victory over Ohio State in the famous Snow Bowl game played on November 25. The game was played at Ohio Stadium in Columbus in a blizzard, at 10 degrees above zero, on an icy field, and with winds gusting over 30 miles per hour. U-M did not get a first down or complete a pass in the blizzard, punted 24 times, and rushed for only 27 yards, but won 9–3 on a touchdown and a safety, both off blocked punts. Michigan back Don Dufek recalled: "It was very cold. We kept our hands under our armpits in the huddle. Our center (Carl Kreager) didn't wear any gloves. You couldn't get up a head of steam for anything. It was bad news, period."

Both Michigan scores came off blocked punts, one resulting in a safety and the other in a touchdown. All-American "Brick" Wahl was responsible for the safety, blocking a punt by OSU's Heisman Trophy winner Vic Janowicz. The Michigan Daily reported the next day on Wahl's block: "In tallying the safety it was Michigan's captain Al Wahl, who crashed in Janowicz' well-exercised kicking leg. The ball bounced erratically to the right of the onrushing Maize and Blue lineman and was floundering less than a foot outside the end zone border when speedy Al Jackson caught up with it. Six inches closer and the Wolverines could have added six more points."

=== Rose Bowl: vs. California ===
Rose Bowl: Michigan vs. California

Team	1	2	3	4	Total
• Michigan (5–3–1)	0	0	0	14	14
California (9–0–1)	0	6	0	0	6

- Date: January 1, 1951
- Location: Rose Bowl
  Pasadena, CA
- Game attendance: 98,939

The Wolverines then advanced to the Rose Bowl where they beat the previously undefeated California Bears (9–0–1) by a score of 14–6. Michigan was held scoreless and trailed 6–0 after three quarters, but Dufek took over in the fourth quarter. He ran for 113 yards in the game and scored two touchdowns in the final six minutes of the game. Dufek was named MVP of the game.

== Statistical leaders ==
=== Scoring ===
Player	TD	FG	XPT	Points
Don Dufek	7	0	0	42
Harry Allis	3	0	14	32

=== Rushing ===
Player	Attempts	Net yards	Yards per attempt	Touchdowns
Don Dufek	174	702	4.0	8
Wes Bradford	26	132	5.1	1
Ralph Straffon	34	127	3.7	2

=== Passing ===
Player	Attempts	Completions	Interceptions	Comp %	Yards	Yds/Comp	TD	Long
Chuck Ortmann	120	56	8	46.7	736	13.1	1	29
Bill Putich	55	21	8	38.2	233	11.1	1	47
Don Peterson	23	8	0	34.8	114	14.3	2	48

=== Receiving ===
Player	Receptions	Yards	Yds/Recp	TD	Long
Lowell Perry	24	374	15.6	1	47
Don Dufek	13	201	15.5	0	24
Fred Pickard	15	179	11.9	1	15

=== Kickoff returns ===
Player	Returns	Yards	Yds/Return	TD	Long
Don Dufek	4	73	18.3	0	34
Chuck Ortmann	2	63	31.5	0	35
Leo Koceski	2	55	27.5	0	30

=== Punt returns ===
Player	Returns	Yards	Yds/Return	TD	Long
Lowell Perry	11	75	6.8	0	18
Chuck Ortmann	10	73	7.3	0	23
Leo Koceski	9	47	5.2	0	28

== Starting lineups ==
=== Offense ===
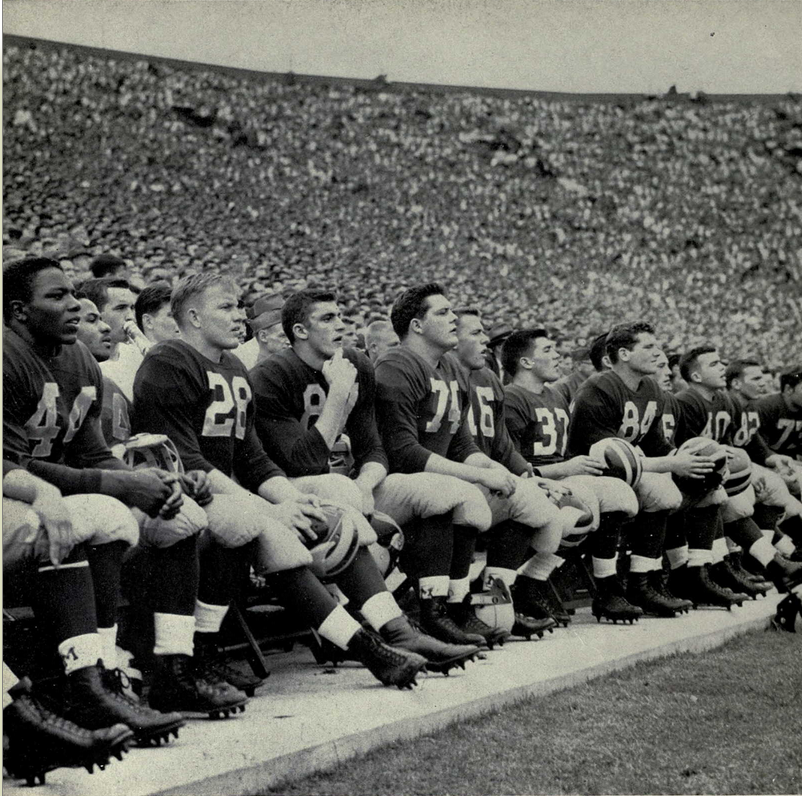
Michigan players on the sidelines at Michigan Stadium, 1950

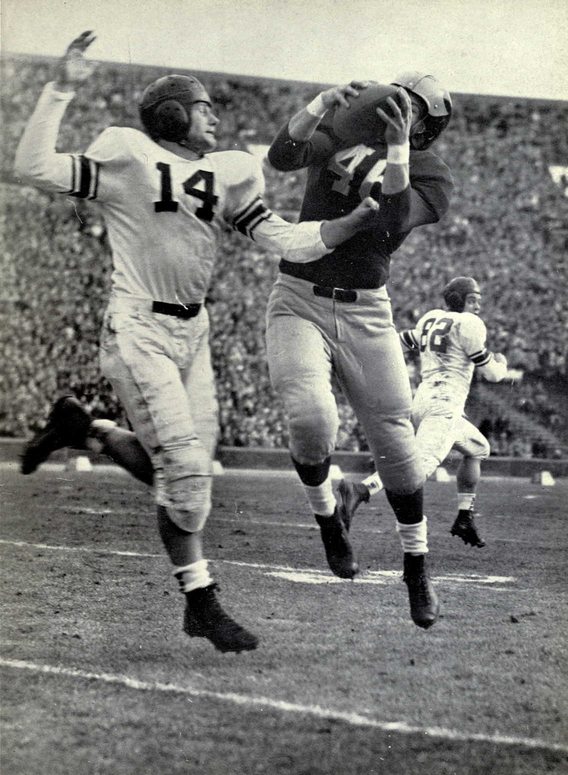
Don Peterson catches ball

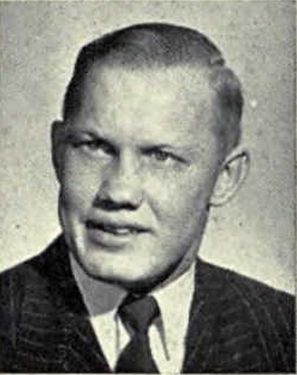
Peter N. Palmer, backup QB 1948-1950

- Left end: Lowell Perry (6 games); Oswald Clark (4 games)
- Left tackle: Thomas Johnson (6 games); John Hess (4 games)
- Left guard: Peter Kinyon (9 games)
- Center: Carl Kreager (5 games); Jon Padjen (5 games)
- Right guard: Thomas Kelsey (5 games); Jim Wolter (4 games)
- Right tackle: Robert Allen "Brick" Wahl (6 games); Ralph Stribe (3 games)
- Right end: Harry Allis (9 games)
- Quarterback: Bill Putich (10 games)
- Fullback: Don Dufek (10 games)
- Left halfback: Chuck Ortmann (9 games)
- Right halfback: Leo Koceski (4 games); Don Peterson (2 games); Frank Howll (2 games)

=== Defense ===
- Left end: Harry Allis (6 games); Merritt Green (4 games)
- Left tackle: Thomas Johnson (10 games)
- Left guard: Dick McWilliams (5 games); Robert Timm (2 games); Thomas Kelsey (1 game); John Powers (1 game); Allen Jackson (1 game)
- Right guard: Allen Jackson (9 games); Dick McWilliams (1 game)
- Right tackle: Robert Allen "Brick" Wahl (10 games)
- Right end: Oswald Clark (9 games); Fred Pickard (1 game)
- Linebacker: Roger Zatkoff (9 games); Ted Topor (1 game)
- Linebacker: Tony Momsen (10 games)
- Left halfback: Don Dufek (9 games); Leo Koceski (1 game)
- Right halfback: Don Peterson (3 games); Don Oldham (2 games); Frank Howell (2 games); Thomas Witherspoon (1); Leo Koceski (2 games)
- Safety: Chuck Ortmann (7 games); Leo Koceski (3 games); Lowell Perry (1 game)

== Awards and honors ==
- Captain: Robert Allen "Brick" Wahl
- All-Americans: Robert Allen "Brick" Wahl
- All-Conference: Robert Allen "Brick" Wahl, Chuck Ortmann, Don Dufek
- Most Valuable Player: Don Dufek
- Meyer Morton Award: Roger Zatkoff

== Coaching staff ==
- Head coach: Bennie Oosterbaan
- Assistant coaches: Jack Blott, George Ceithaml, Forrest Jordan, Cliff Keen, Ernest McCoy, Bill Orwig, Don Robinson, Walter Weber, J. T. White
- Trainer: Jim Hunt
- Manager: William Searle

== See also ==
- 1950 in Michigan
