= Tony Momsen =

American football player (1928–1994)

No. 55, 51, 57
- Position: Center

Personal information
- Born: January 29, 1928; Toledo, Ohio, U.S.
- Died: March 6, 1994 (aged 66); Columbus, Ohio, U.S.
- Listed height: 6 ft 1 in (1.85 m)
- Listed weight: 215 lb (98 kg)

Career information
- High school: Libbey (Toledo)
- College: Michigan (1945–1946, 1949–1950)
- NFL draft: 1951: 5th round, 59th overall pick

Career history
- Pittsburgh Steelers (1951); Washington Redskins (1952); Calgary Stampeders (1953)

Awards and highlights
- CFL All-Star (1953); Second-team All-Big Ten (1950)

Career NFL statistics
- Games played: 13
- Games started: 1
- Fumble recoveries: 1
- Stats at Pro Football Reference

Anton Henry "Tony" Momsen, Jr. (January 29, 1928 – March 6, 1994) was an American professional football center in the National Football League (NFL) for the Pittsburgh Steelers and the Washington Redskins. He played college football at the University of Michigan in 1945, 1949 and 1950, and is most remembered for scoring the winning touchdown in the 1950 Snow Bowl game between Michigan and Ohio State.

== Early life ==
Momsen was born in Toledo, Ohio in 1928. He was the son of Rose and Anton Momsen, Sr. He attended Toledo's Libbey High School where he was a star athlete in football, basketball and track. In 1944, he was selected as the first-team center on the Associated Press All-Ohio football team. In announcing the selection, the AP quoted an Ohio coach who said, "Momsen was one of the finest linebackers I have ever seen. He diagnoses plays rapidly, is extremely fast and is a terrific tackler." He was also an all-city and all-state basketball player.

== University of Michigan ==
Momsen enrolled at the University of Michigan in 1945. In November 1945, when Michigan's starting center, Harold Watts, was transferred for additional Navy training, Momsen became a starter at center for the 1945 football team.

After the 1945 season, Momsen withdrew from school. He entered the military. He also married and had two children. In 1947, he played football for Bob Snyder's Grills in the City Federation football league.

In the winter of 1949, Momsen returned to the University of Michigan. Momsen played center and linebacker for the 1949 and 1950 Michigan football teams.

Momsen is most remembered for his role in the famed 1950 Snow Bowl game against Ohio State. The game matched Momsen against his younger brother, Robert "Buckeye Bob" Momsen, who was a starter for Ohio State. The game was played in a blizzard, with weather conditions so inclement that Michigan punted on first down for its first two plays from scrimmage, after concluding that the best strategy was to keep the slick ball on the other side of the field and in the hands of Ohio State. The Buckeyes scored when Vic Janowicz kicked a field goal after Robert Momsen recovered a blocked Wolverine kick. With 47 seconds remaining in the first half, Tony Momsen blocked a Janowicz punt and fell on the ball in the end zone for a touchdown. The Wolverines won by a final score of 9-3. Momsen, who scored the game's only touchdown was remembered as "the hero of a brilliant forward wall." Bob Momsen later recalled, "Two brothers got more publicity for playing in a terrible football game than anyone ever deserves."

The win over Ohio State sent Michigan to the 1951 Rose Bowl against California. In the lead-up to the Rose Bowl, the Los Angeles Times gave credit to linement Roger Zatkoff and Momsen for leading Michigan's defense: "Zatkoff and Tony Momsen, the other backer-upper in Michigan's usual six-man line defense, are the main reasons why Michigan topped the Big Ten in throttling opponents."

== Professional football ==
The Los Angeles Rams selected Momsen 59th overall in the fifth round of the 1951 NFL draft. He signed with the Rams in July 1951, but was traded to the Pittsburgh Steelers before the 1951 NFL season started. Momsen appeared in 11 games, all as a backup for the 1951 Steelers. In August 1952, Momsen was traded to the Washington Redskins. Momsen appeared in two games for the 1952 Redskins before being released on October 7, 1952.

In 1953, Momsen played for the Calgary Stampeders of the Western Interprovincial Football League. In 1954, Momsen was in the Toronto Argonauts organization. He quit the Argonauts in August 1954 after being told he would play for the Argonauts' farm team.

== Later life ==
After retiring from football, Momsen worked as a cement contractor and built customized golf clubs. He lived in Sunrise, Florida for the last 25 years of his life. In March 1994, he died at Riverside Methodist Hospital in Columbus, Ohio, due to complications following hip replacement surgery. Three weeks after Momsen's death, Libbey High School announced that Momsen would be included among the initial inductees into the Libbey High School Hall of Fame.
