= 1950 Iowa Hawkeyes football team =

American college football season

1950 Iowa Hawkeyes football
- Conference: Big Ten Conference
- Record: 3–5–1 (2–4 Big Ten)
- Head coach: Leonard Raffensperger (1st season)
- MVP: Harold Bradley Jr.
- Home stadium: Iowa Stadium

1950 Big Ten Conference football standings
	Conf.					Overall
Team	W		L		T	W		L		T
No. 9 Michigan $	4	–	1	–	1	6	–	3	–	1
No. 14 Ohio State	5	–	2	–	0	6	–	3	–	0
Wisconsin	5	–	2	–	0	6	–	3	–	0
No. 13 Illinois	4	–	2	–	0	7	–	2	–	0
Northwestern	3	–	3	–	0	6	–	3	–	0
Iowa	2	–	4	–	0	3	–	5	–	1
Minnesota	1	–	4	–	1	1	–	7	–	1
Indiana	1	–	4	–	0	3	–	5	–	1
Purdue	1	–	4	–	0	2	–	7	–	0
$ – Conference champion; Rankings from AP Poll

The 1950 Iowa Hawkeyes football team was an American football team that represented the University of Iowa as a member of the Big Nine Conference during the 1950 Big Nine football season. In their first season under head coach Leonard Raffensperger, the Hawkeyes compiled a 4–5 record (3–3 in conference games), finished in sixth place in the Big Nine, and were outscored by a total of 201 to 121.

The 1950 Hawkeyes gained 1,650 rushing yards and 994 passing yards. On defense, they gave up 1,242 rushing yards and 1,107 passing yards.

On October 28, 1950, Ohio State scored 83 points against Iowa. The Buckeyes' 83 points remains the largest point total given up by an Iowa team since 1902 when Michigan's Point-a-Minute team scored 107 points against the Hawkeyes.

The team's statistical leaders included Glenn Drahn (585 rushing yards, 55-of-168 passing for 835 yards); Bill Reichardt (11 receptions for 95 yards); and Jerry Faske (24 points scored). Tackle Harold Bradley Jr. was selected as the team's most valuable player.

The team played its home games at Iowa Stadium in Iowa City, Iowa. Home attendance was 222,921, an average of 44,584 per game.

== Schedule ==
Date	Opponent	Rank	Site	Result	Attendance	Source
September 29	at No. 12 USC*		Los Angeles Memorial Coliseum; Los Angeles, CA	W 20–14	45,167	
October 7	at Indiana	No. 17	Memorial Stadium; Bloomington, IN	L 7–20		
October 14	No. 15 Wisconsin		Iowa Stadium; Iowa City, IA (rivalry)	L 0–14	46,333	
October 21	Purdue^{†}		Iowa Stadium; Iowa City, IA	W 33–21	52,261	
October 28	at No. 6 Ohio State		Ohio Stadium; Columbus, OH	L 21–83	82,174	
November 4	at Minnesota		Memorial Stadium; Minneapolis, MN (rivalry)	W 13–0	60,321	
November 11	No. 10 Illinois		Iowa Stadium; Iowa City, IA	L 7–21	45,104	
November 18	Notre Dame*		Iowa Stadium; Iowa City, IA	T 14–14	52,863	
November 24	at No. 14 Miami (FL)*		Burdine Stadium; Miami, FL	L 6–14	44,999	
*Non-conference game; ^{†}Homecoming; Rankings from AP Poll released prior to the game

== Players ==
The following players won varsity letters for their performance on the 1950 Iowa football team:

- Bernie Bennett, halfback, 175 pounds, Mason City, IA
- Don Bjork, end, Albert City, IA
- Robert Bostwick
- Harold Bradley Jr., tackle and MVP, 215 pounds, Chicago
- Duane Brandt, halfback, Waverly, IA
- Joe Bristol
- Burt Britzman, quarterback, Hawarden, IA
- Andy Buntz, tackle, Des Moines, IA
- Arnold Caplan, end, Des Moines, IA
- Don Commack, halfback, 180 pounds, Waterloo, IA
- Chuck Denning, fullback
- David DeProspero, end
- Jack Dittmer
- Glenn Drahn, quarterback, 185 pounds, Monona, IA
- Ron Fairchild, guard, Coralville, IA
- Jerry Faske, halfback, 185 pounds, Brooklyn, NY
- Lou Ginsberg, guard, Cedar Rapids, IA
- Bill Greene, fullback, Iowa City, IA
- Bob Hoff, end, 190 pounds, Cedar Rapids, IA
- Hubert Johnston, tackle, 240 pounds, Wheeling, WV
- Robert Lage, guard, 190 pounds, Long Grove, IA
- Jerry Long, end, 210 pounds, Ottumwa, IA
- Dick Meyer, end, Burlington, IA
- Dudley Noble, tackle, Ft. Madison, IA
- Joe Paulsen, tackle, Davenport, IA
- Ron Petersen, center, Clear Lake, IA
- Bill Reichart, fullback, 205 pounds, Iowa City, IA (All-Big Ten)
- Donald (Mike) Riley, fullback
- Fred Ruck, quarterback, Davenport, IA
- Jim Sangster, quarterback, Iowa City, IA
- Pete Spanjers, tackle, Milbank, SD
- Donald Swartzendruber, end, Wellman, IA
- John Towner, center, 205 pounds, Des Moines, IA
- Austin Turner, guard, 205 pounds, Corning, IA
- Bob Wilson, halfback, 185 pounds, Iowa City, IA
- Donald A. Woodhause (or Woodhouse), tackle, Harlan, IA
