= UPI College Football Player of the Year =

American football award

UPI Player of the year
- Awarded for: The Most Outstanding Offensive or Defensive College Football Player of the Year
- Country: United States
- Presented by: United Press International

History
- First award: 1950
- Final award: 1991

The United Press International (UPI) College Football Player of the Year Award was among the first and most recognized college football awards. With the second bankruptcy of UPI in 1991, along with that of its parent company, the award was discontinued. Offensive and defensive players were eligible. Unlike the Heisman, it was never affiliated with a civic organization or named after a player (like the Walter Camp Award). Like all UPI college awards at the time, it was based on the votes of NCAA coaches. Billy Cannon, O.J. Simpson, and Archie Griffin are the only two-time winners.

== Winners ==
Year	Player	Position	School
1950	Vic Janowicz	Halfback	Ohio State
1951	Dick Kazmaier	Halfback	Princeton
1952	Billy Vessels	Halfback	Oklahoma
1953	Paul Giel	Halfback	Minnesota
1954	Alan Ameche	Fullback	Wisconsin
1955	Howard Cassady	Halfback	Ohio State
1956	Johnny Majors	Halfback	Tennessee
1957	John David Crow	Halfback	Texas A&M
1958	Billy Cannon	Halfback	LSU
1959	Billy Cannon (2)	Halfback	LSU
1960	Joe Bellino	Halfback	Navy
1961	Bob Ferguson	Fullback	Ohio State
1962	Terry Baker	Quarterback	Oregon State
1963	Roger Staubach	Quarterback	Navy
1964	John Huarte	Quarterback	Notre Dame
1965	Mike Garrett	Halfback	USC
1966	Steve Spurrier	Quarterback	Florida
1967	O. J. Simpson	Halfback	USC
1968	O. J. Simpson (2)	Halfback	USC
1969	Steve Owens	Halfback	Oklahoma
1970	Jim Plunkett	Quarterback	Stanford
1971	Ed Marinaro	Halfback	Cornell
1972	Johnny Rodgers	Wide receiver	Nebraska
1973	John Cappelletti	Halfback	Penn State
1974	Archie Griffin	Halfback	Ohio State
1975	Archie Griffin (2)	Halfback	Ohio State
1976	Tony Dorsett	Halfback	Pittsburgh
1977	Earl Campbell	Halfback	Texas
1978	Billy Sims	Halfback	Oklahoma
1979	Charles White	Halfback	USC
1980	Hugh Green	Defensive end	Pittsburgh
1981	Marcus Allen	Running back	USC
1982	Herschel Walker	Running back	Georgia
1983	Mike Rozier	Running back	Nebraska
1984	Doug Flutie	Quarterback	Boston College
1985	Bo Jackson	Running back	Auburn
1986	Vinny Testaverde	Quarterback	Miami (FL)
1987	Tim Brown	Wide receiver	Notre Dame
1988	Barry Sanders	Running back	Oklahoma State
1989	Andre Ware	Quarterback	Houston
1990	Ty Detmer	Quarterback	BYU
1991	Desmond Howard	Wide receiver	Michigan
