= 1950 Wisconsin Badgers football team =

American college football season

1950 Wisconsin Badgers football
- Conference: Big Ten Conference

Ranking
- Coaches: No. T–20
- Record: 6–3 (5–2 Big Ten)
- Head coach: Ivy Williamson (2nd season)
- MVP: Bob Radcliffe
- Captain: Ken Huxhold
- Home stadium: Camp Randall Stadium

1950 Big Ten Conference football standings
	Conf.					Overall
Team	W		L		T	W		L		T
No. 9 Michigan $	4	–	1	–	1	6	–	3	–	1
No. 14 Ohio State	5	–	2	–	0	6	–	3	–	0
Wisconsin	5	–	2	–	0	6	–	3	–	0
No. 13 Illinois	4	–	2	–	0	7	–	2	–	0
Northwestern	3	–	3	–	0	6	–	3	–	0
Iowa	2	–	4	–	0	3	–	5	–	1
Minnesota	1	–	4	–	1	1	–	7	–	1
Indiana	1	–	4	–	0	3	–	5	–	1
Purdue	1	–	4	–	0	2	–	7	–	0
$ – Conference champion; Rankings from AP Poll

The 1950 Wisconsin Badgers football team represented the University of Wisconsin in the 1950 Big Ten Conference football season. Led by second-year head coach Ivy Williamson, the Badgers compiled an overall record of 6–3 with a mark of 5–2 in conference play, tying for second place in the Big Ten. Bob Radcliffe was the team's MVP and Ken Huxhold was team captain.

== Schedule ==
Date	Opponent	Rank	Site	Result	Attendance	Source
September 30	Marquette*		Camp Randall Stadium; Madison, WI	W 28–6	45,000	
October 7	at No. 15 Illinois		Memorial Stadium; Champaign, IL	W 7–6	54,230	
October 14	at Iowa	No. 15	Iowa Stadium; Iowa City, IA (rivalry)	W 14–0	46,333	
October 21	at Michigan	No. 16	Michigan Stadium; Ann Arbor, MI	L 13–26	91,202	
October 28	No. 9 Northwestern		Camp Randall Stadium; Madison, WI	W 14–13	45,000	
November 4	Purdue^{†}	No. 20	Camp Randall Stadium; Madison, WI	W 33–7	45,000	
November 11	at No. 2 Ohio State	No. 15	Ohio Stadium; Columbus, OH	L 14–19	81,535	
November 18	at No. 20 Penn	No. 15	Franklin Field; Philadelphia, PA	L 0–20	60,000	
November 25	Minnesota		Camp Randall Stadium; Madison, WI (rivalry)	W 14–0	45,000	
*Non-conference game; ^{†}Homecoming; Rankings from AP Poll released prior to the game
