= 1950 Minnesota Golden Gophers football team =

American college football season

1950 Minnesota Golden Gophers football
- Conference: Big Ten Conference
- Record: 1–7–1 (1–4–1 Big Ten)
- Head coach: Bernie Bierman (16th season)
- MVP: Wayne Robinson
- Captain: Dave Skrien
- Home stadium: Memorial Stadium

1950 Big Ten Conference football standings
	Conf.					Overall
Team	W		L		T	W		L		T
No. 9 Michigan $	4	–	1	–	1	6	–	3	–	1
No. 14 Ohio State	5	–	2	–	0	6	–	3	–	0
Wisconsin	5	–	2	–	0	6	–	3	–	0
No. 13 Illinois	4	–	2	–	0	7	–	2	–	0
Northwestern	3	–	3	–	0	6	–	3	–	0
Iowa	2	–	4	–	0	3	–	5	–	1
Minnesota	1	–	4	–	1	1	–	7	–	1
Indiana	1	–	4	–	0	3	–	5	–	1
Purdue	1	–	4	–	0	2	–	7	–	0
$ – Conference champion; Rankings from AP Poll

The 1950 Minnesota Golden Gophers football team represented the University of Minnesota in the 1950 Big Nine Conference football season. In their 16th year under head coach Bernie Bierman, the Golden Gophers compiled a 1–7–1 record and were outscored by their opponents by a combined total of 196 to 79.

Wayne Robinson was awarded the Team MVP Award.

Total attendance for the season was 267,015, which averaged to 53,403. The season high for attendance was against Iowa.

== Schedule ==
Date	Opponent	Rank	Site	Result	Attendance	Source
September 30	at Washington*	No. 18	Husky Stadium; Seattle, WA	L 13–28	49,500	
October 7	Nebraska*		Memorial Stadium; Minneapolis, MN (rivalry)	L 26–32	47,710	
October 14	at Northwestern		Dyche Stadium; Evanston, IL	L 6–13	45,000	
October 21	No. 9 Ohio State		Memorial Stadium; Minneapolis, MN	L 0–48	53,192	
October 28	No. 14 Michigan		Memorial Stadium; Minneapolis, MN (Little Brown Jug)	T 7–7	59,412	
November 4	Iowa^{†}		Memorial Stadium; Minneapolis, MN (rivalry)	L 0–13	60,321	
November 11	at No. 12 Michigan State*		Spartan Stadium; East Lansing, MI	L 0–27	47,461	
November 18	Purdue		Memorial Stadium; Minneapolis, MN	W 27–14	46,389	
November 25	at Wisconsin		Camp Randall Stadium; Madison, WI (rivalry)	L 0–14	45,000	
*Non-conference game; ^{†}Homecoming; Rankings from AP Poll released prior to the game

== Game summaries ==
=== Michigan ===
Week 5: Michigan at Minnesota

Team	1	2	3	4	Total
Michigan	0	0	7	0	7
Minnesota	0	0	0	7	7

- Date: October 28, 1950
- Location: Memorial Stadium
  Minneapolis
- Game attendance: 60,158

In its fifth game, Minnesota tied Michigan. After a scoreless first half, Michigan drove down the field culminating in a two-yard run by Don Dufek. Minnesota tied the game with a touchdown in the final two minutes to tie the game at 7-7. Dufek rushed for 63 yards, but the Minnesota team held Michigan to a total of only 46 yards rushing as Chuck Ortmann was held to -38 rushing yards. With the tie game, Michigan retained possession of the Little Brown Jug.
