= Leonard Raffensperger =

American athlete and coach (1903–1974)

Biographical details
- Born: November 6, 1903; Victor, Iowa, U.S.
- Died: September 19, 1974 (aged 70); Iowa City, Iowa, U.S.

Playing career

Football
- 1924–1925: Iowa

Basketball
- 1924–1925: Iowa
- Position: Lineman (football)

Coaching career (HC unless noted)

Football
- 1931–1947: Waterloo East HS (IA)
- 1948–1949: Iowa (freshmen)
- 1950–1951: Iowa

Head coaching record
- Overall: 5–10–3 (college); 110–48–14 (high school)

Leonard Raffensperger (November 6, 1903 – September 19, 1974) was an American football and basketball player and coach. He served as the head football coach at the University of Iowa for two seasons in 1950 and 1951, compiling a record of 5–10–3. Raffensperger played football and basketball at Iowa and then served as a high school football coach for 21 years before joining the Iowa Hawkeyes football staff as an assistant coach in 1948.

== Playing career ==
Born in Victor, Iowa, Raffensperger did not play high school football, but he tried out for the football team at the University of Iowa and made the squad. He was a reserve lineman for coach Burt Ingwersen who did not see much playing time on the football field, though he did earn a letter with the Iowa basketball team as a sophomore in 1924–25.

Before Iowa's homecoming football game against Illinois in 1925, the Hawkeye team received a telegram from Ledrue Galloway, a talented black tackle from the 1924 team, who was fighting tuberculosis. Galloway's telegram said, "There will be twelve Iowa men on the field to beat Illinois. I am with you." Things looked bleak at first, when Red Grange returned the opening kickoff 89 yards for a touchdown. But Iowa fought back and delivered a 12–10 victory for their teammate Galloway, who died less than a year later. Raffensperger, a junior, suffered a career-ending knee injury in the game, and his playing career at Iowa was over.

== Coaching career ==
Raffensperger graduated from Iowa in 1927 and took a high school coaching job in Reinbeck, Iowa. His football teams posted a 20–7–6 record in four years, from 1927 to 1930. Waterloo East High School in Waterloo, Iowa, hired Raffensperger in 1931, and he spent the next 17 seasons there, compiling a 90–41–8 record.

Iowa's football coach Eddie Anderson was granted a larger coaching staff after the 1947 season, and he used it to hire Raffensperger as the coach of his freshman team. Raffensperger served as an assistant to Anderson in this capacity for two seasons. At the conclusion of the 1949 football season, Anderson left Iowa for Holy Cross.

Iowa fans seemed to want an Iowa graduate to head the football program after Anderson's departure. Although the search was not limited to Iowa graduates, many of the top candidates had Iowa ties, including Wesley Fry. However, Raffensperger was already on staff, so he had the inside track. Raffensperger signed a three-year contract to become Iowa's 18th head football coach, beginning with the 1950 season. He was the second Iowa graduate to be named as Iowa's head coach, following John G. Griffith in 1909.

In 1950, Iowa had a 3–5–1 record, upsetting Purdue and battling Notre Dame to a 14–14 tie. The following season, Iowa posted a 2–5–2 record and failed to win a Big Ten game. However, Iowa was led by fullback Bill Reichardt, who was named the Big Ten MVP in 1951.

== Later life and death ==
Raffensperger still had one year left on his contract. Iowa athletic director Paul Brechler only wanted to make a coaching change if he could find a "top man". He had targeted Forest Evashevski as that man. When Evashevski decided to take the Iowa job in 1952, Raffensperger was offered full salary for the final year of his contract and another position in the Iowa athletic department. Raffensperger accepted the offer, and he worked for the Iowa athletic department for over a decade until he decided to retire. Raffensperger died of cancer in Iowa City, Iowa, on September 19, 1974, at age 70.

== Head coaching record ==
=== College ===
Year	Team	Overall	Conference	Standing	Bowl/playoffs
Iowa Hawkeyes (Big Ten Conference) (1950–1951)
1950	Iowa	3–5–1	2–4	6th	
1951	Iowa	2–5–2	0–5–1	9th	
Iowa:		5–10–3	2–9–1		
Total:		5–10–3			
