= 1950 All-America college football team =

Official list of the best college football players of 1950

The 1950 All-America college football team is composed of college football players who were selected as All-Americans by various organizations and writers that chose All-America college football teams in 1950. The eight selectors recognized by the NCAA as "official" for the 1950 season are (1) the All-America Board (AAB), (2) the American Football Coaches Association (AFCA), (3) the Associated Press (AP), (4) the Football Writers Association of America (FW), (5) the International News Service (INS), (6) the Newspaper Enterprise Association (NEA), (7) the Sporting News (SN), and (8) the United Press (UP).

Ohio State halfback Vic Janowicz, Army end Dan Foldberg, and Texas guard Bud McFadin were the only three players to be unanimously named first-team All-Americans by all eight official selectors. Janowicz was awarded the 1950 Heisman Trophy.

== Consensus All-Americans ==
For the year 1950, the NCAA recognizes eight published All-American teams as "official" designations for purposes of its consensus determinations. The following chart identifies the NCAA-recognized consensus All-Americans and displays which first-team designations they received.

Name	Position	School	Number	Official	Other
Dan Foldberg	End	Army	8/8	AAB, AFCA, APO, FWO, INSO, NEA, SN, UP	CP, WC
Bud McFadin	Guard	Texas	8/8	AAB, AFCA, APO, FWO, INSO, NEA, SN, UP	CP, WC
Vic Janowicz	Halfback	Ohio State	8/8	AAB, AFCA, APD, FW, INSD, NEA, SN, UP	CP, WC
Kyle Rote	Halfback	SMU	7/8	AAB, AFCA, FWO, INSO, NEA, SN, UP	CP, WC
Bill McColl	End	Stanford	7/8	AAB, AFCA, FWD, INSD, NEA, SN, UP	CP, WC
Bob Gain	Tackle	Kentucky	7/8	AAB, APO, FWO, INSD, NEA, SN, UP	CP, WC
Jim Weatherall	Tackle	Oklahoma	7/8	AFCA, APO, FWO, INSO, NEA, SN, UP	CP, WC
Les Richter	Guard	California	6/8	AAB, APD, FWD, INSO, SN, UP	CP, WC
Babe Parilli	Quarterback	Kentucky	5/8	AAB, AFCA, INSO, NEA, SN	WC
Leon Heath	Fullback	Oklahoma	4/8	AAB, AFCA, INSD, UP	WC
Jerry Groom	Center	Notre Dame	3/8	NEA, SN, UP	CP, WC

== All-American selections for 1950 ==
=== Ends ===
- Dan Foldberg, Army (AAB; AFCA; APO-1; FWO; INSO-1; SN; UP-1; CP-1; WC)
- Bill McColl, Stanford (College Football Hall of Fame) (AAB; AFCA; APD-2; FWD; INSD-1; SN; UP-1; CP-1; WC)
- Bucky Curtis, Vanderbilt (APO-2; FWO; INSD-1; CP-2)
- Don Stonesifer, Northwestern (APO-1; UP-2)
- Jim Doran, Iowa State (APO-2; INSO-1)
- Don Menasco, Texas (APD-1)
- Blaine Earon, Duke (APD-1)
- Frank Anderson, Oklahoma (APD-1)
- Dorne Dibble, Michigan State (FWD)
- Bob Carey, Michigan State (UP-2; CP-3)
- Herb Agocs, Penn (CP-2)
- Tony Klimek, Illinois (CP-3)

=== Tackles ===
- Bob Gain, Kentucky (College Football Hall of Fame) (AAB; APO-1; FWO; INSD; SN; UP-1; CP-1; WC)
- Jim Weatherall, Oklahoma (College Football Hall of Fame) (AFCA; APO-1; FWO; INSO; SN; UP-1; CP-1; WC)
- Allen Wahl, Michigan (AAB; APD-1; INSO; UP-2; CP-2)
- Hollie Donan, Princeton (College Football Hall of Fame) (AFCA; FWD)
- Charles Shira, Army (INSD; CP-3)
- Al Carapella, Miami (APD-1)
- Albert Tate, Illinois (FWD)
- Bill Trautwein, Ohio State (UP-2; CP-2)
- Jim Staton, Wake Forest (APO-2)
- C.T. Hewgley, Wyoming (APO-2)
- Paul Lea, Tulane (APD-2)
- Elmer Costa, North Carolina State (APD-2)
- Paul Giroski, Rice (CP-3)

=== Guards ===
- Bud McFadin, Texas (College Football Hall of Fame) (AFCA; AAB; APO-1; FWO; INSO; SN; UP-1; CP-1; WC)
- Les Richter, California (College Football Hall of Fame) (AAB; APD-1; FWD [LB]; INSO; SN; UP-1; CP-1; WC)
- Bob Ward, Maryland (College Football Hall of Fame) (APO-1; FWO; UP-2; CP-2)
- Ted Daffer, Tennessee (AFCA; APD-1; FWD; INSD; CP-3)
- Elmer Stout, Army (APD-1 [LB]; FWD [LB])
- Donn Moomaw, UCLA (College Football Hall of Fame) (AP-2 [LB]; INSD [LB])
- Bob Momsen, Ohio State (FWD)
- Bill Ciaravino, Lehigh (INSD)
- Bernie Lemonick, Penn (APD-2; UP-2)
- Mike Mizerany, Alabama (APD-2)
- Pat Cannamela, USC (APO-2)
- John Biltz, Ohio State (APO-2)
- Jerry Audette, Columbia (CP-2)
- Brad Glass, Princeton (CP-3)
- Leo Cahill, Illinois (UP-3)

=== Centers ===
- Jerry Groom, Notre Dame (College Football Hall of Fame) (APD-2 [LB]; SN; UP-1; CP-1; WC)
- Irv Holdash, North Carolina (AAB; APD-1 [LB]; UP-2; CP-2)
- Redmond Finney, Princeton (INSO; FWO)
- Bill Vohaska, Illinois (APO-1)
- Bob McCullough, Ohio State (AFCA)
- John Pierik, Cornell (APO-2; CP-3)

=== Quarterbacks ===
- Babe Parilli, Kentucky (AAB; AFCA; APO-2; INSO; SN; UP-2; CP-2; WC)
- Bob Williams, Notre Dame (College Football Hall of Fame) (APD-1; FW-1 [qb]; SN; UP-1; CP-1)
- Don Heinrich, Washington (College Football Hall of Fame) (APO-1)

=== Halfbacks ===
- Vic Janowicz, Ohio State (College Football Hall of Fame) (1950 Heisman Trophy winner) (AAB; AFCA; APD-1; FW-1 [hb]; INSD; SN; UP-1; CP-1; WC)
- Kyle Rote, SMU (College Football Hall of Fame) (AAB; AFCA; APO-2; FWO [fb]; INSO; SN; UP-1; CP-1; WC)
- Bobby Reynolds, Nebraska (College Football Hall of Fame) (APO-1; FWO [hb]; INSD; UP-2; CP-2)
- Eddie Talboom, Wyoming (College Football Hall of Fame) (APO-2; INSO; CP-3)
- Dick Kazmaier, Princeton (College Football Hall of Fame) (1951 Heisman Trophy winner) (APO-1; CP-2)
- Johnny Bright, Drake (College and Canadian Football Hall of Fame) (APO-2; INSD)
- Reds Bagnell, Penn (College Football Hall of Fame) (UP-2; CP-2)
- Chuck Ortmann, Michigan (CP-3)
- Bill Cox, Duke (CP-3)

=== Fullbacks ===
- Leon Heath, Oklahoma (AAB; AFCA; APD-2; INSD; UP-1; CP-3; WC)
- Sonny Grandelius, Michigan State (APO-1; INSO; UP-2; CP-1)
- John Dottley, Ole Miss (APD-2)

=== Defensive backs ===
- Ed Salem, Alabama (APD-1)
- Dick Sprague, Washington (FWD)
- Ed Withers, Wisconsin (FWD)
- Buddy Jones, Oklahoma (FWD)
- Wilford White, Arizona State (APD-2)

== Key ==
- **Bold** – Consensus All-American
- -1 – First-team selection
- -2 – Second-team selection
- -3 – Third-team selection

=== Official selectors ===
- AAB = All-America Board
- AFCA = American Football Coaches Association
- APO/APD = Associated Press: "For the first time in history, the Associated Press All-American football team was divided into two platoons, offensive and defensive." The "APO" designation refers to players selected for the offensive squad, and "APD" refers to selections for the defensive squad.
- FWO/FWD = Football Writers Association of America. The "FWO" designation refers to players selected for the offensive squad, and "FWD" refers to selections for the defensive squad
- INSO/INSD = International News Service: "The 22-man All-America, divided for the third straight year into offensive and defensive platoons of equal merit, was pioneered by INS in 1948 in keeping with the new age of football specialization, and since has come into national favor. As usual, all eight backs on the INS team are offensive standouts. The only distinction drawn is that the four backs on the offensive side of the team saw no work on defense." The "INSO" designation refers to players selected for the offensive squad, and "INSD" refers to selections for the defensive squad.
- NEA = Newspaper Enterprise Association
- SN = Sporting News
- UP = United Press

=== Other selectors ===
- CP = Central Press Association
- WC = Walter Camp Football Foundation

== See also ==
- 1950 All-Big Seven Conference football team
- 1950 All-Big Ten Conference football team
- 1950 All-Pacific Coast Conference football team
- 1950 All-SEC football team
- 1950 All-Skyline Conference football team
- 1950 All-Southwest Conference football team
