= 1950 Indiana Hoosiers football team =

American college football season

1950 Indiana Hoosiers football
- Conference: Big Ten Conference
- Record: 3–5–1 (1–4 Big Ten)
- Head coach: Clyde B. Smith (3rd season)
- MVP: Bob Robertson
- Captain: Ernest Kovatch
- Home stadium: Memorial Stadium

1950 Big Ten Conference football standings
	Conf.					Overall
Team	W		L		T	W		L		T
No. 9 Michigan $	4	–	1	–	1	6	–	3	–	1
No. 14 Ohio State	5	–	2	–	0	6	–	3	–	0
Wisconsin	5	–	2	–	0	6	–	3	–	0
No. 13 Illinois	4	–	2	–	0	7	–	2	–	0
Northwestern	3	–	3	–	0	6	–	3	–	0
Iowa	2	–	4	–	0	3	–	5	–	1
Minnesota	1	–	4	–	1	1	–	7	–	1
Indiana	1	–	4	–	0	3	–	5	–	1
Purdue	1	–	4	–	0	2	–	7	–	0
$ – Conference champion; Rankings from AP Poll

The 1950 Indiana Hoosiers football team represented the Indiana Hoosiers in the 1950 Big Ten Conference football season. The Hoosiers played their home games at Memorial Stadium in Bloomington, Indiana. The team was coached by Clyde B. Smith, in his third year as head coach of the Hoosiers.

== Schedule ==
Date	Time	Opponent	Rank	Site	Result	Attendance	Source
September 30	3:00 p.m.	at Nebraska*		Memorial Stadium; Lincoln, NE	T 20–20	33,000	
October 7		No. 17 Iowa		Memorial Stadium; Bloomington, IN	W 20–7		
October 14		No. 12 Ohio State		Memorial Stadium; Bloomington, IN	L 14–26	29,000	
October 21		No. 11 Notre Dame*		Memorial Stadium; Bloomington, IN	W 20–7	34,100	
October 28		at No. 12 Illinois	No. 19	Memorial Stadium; Champaign, IL (rivalry)	L 0–20	65,021	
November 4		at No. 13 Michigan State*		Macklin Stadium; East Lansing, MI (rivalry)	L 0–35	45,237	
November 11		at Michigan		Michigan Stadium; Ann Arbor, MI	L 7–20	96,517	
November 18		Marquette*		Memorial Stadium; Bloomington, IN	W 18–7		
November 25		at Purdue		Ross–Ade Stadium; West Lafayette, IN (Old Oaken Bucket)	L 0–13	45,000	
*Non-conference game; Rankings from AP Poll released prior to the game; All times are in Eastern time
