= 1950 Northwestern Wildcats football team =

American college football season

1950 Northwestern Wildcats football
- Conference: Big Ten Conference
- Record: 6–3 (3–3 Big Ten)
- Head coach: Bob Voigts (4th season)
- MVP: Chuck Hagmann
- Captain: Don Stonesifer
- Home stadium: Dyche Stadium

1950 Big Ten Conference football standings
	Conf.					Overall
Team	W		L		T	W		L		T
No. 9 Michigan $	4	–	1	–	1	6	–	3	–	1
No. 14 Ohio State	5	–	2	–	0	6	–	3	–	0
Wisconsin	5	–	2	–	0	6	–	3	–	0
No. 13 Illinois	4	–	2	–	0	7	–	2	–	0
Northwestern	3	–	3	–	0	6	–	3	–	0
Iowa	2	–	4	–	0	3	–	5	–	1
Minnesota	1	–	4	–	1	1	–	7	–	1
Indiana	1	–	4	–	0	3	–	5	–	1
Purdue	1	–	4	–	0	2	–	7	–	0
$ – Conference champion; Rankings from AP Poll

The 1950 Northwestern Wildcats team represented Northwestern University during the 1950 Big Ten Conference football season. In their fourth year under head coach Bob Voigts, the Wildcats compiled a 6–3 record (3–3 against Big Ten Conference opponents), finished in fifth in the Big Ten, and outscored their opponents by a combined total of 155 to 143.

== Schedule ==
Date	Opponent	Rank	Site	Result	Attendance	Source
September 30	Iowa State*		Dyche Stadium; Evanston, IL	W 23–13	38,473	
October 7	at Navy*		Memorial Stadium; Baltimore, MD	W 22–0	12,000	
October 14	Minnesota		Dyche Stadium; Evanston, IL	W 13–6	45,000	
October 21	Pittsburgh*	No. 20	Dyche Stadium; Evanston, IL	W 28–23	35,000	
October 28	at Wisconsin	No. 9	Camp Randall Stadium; Madison, WI	L 13–14	45,000	
November 4	No. 4 Ohio State		Dyche Stadium; Evanston, IL	L 0–32	50,000	
November 11	at Purdue		Ross–Ade Stadium; West Lafayette, IN	W 19–14	30,000	
November 18	at Michigan		Michigan Stadium; Ann Arbor, MI (rivalry)	L 23–34	75,075	
November 25	Illinois		Dyche Stadium; Evanston, IL (rivalry)	W 14–7	50,000	
*Non-conference game; Rankings from AP Poll released prior to the game
