= 1950 Purdue Boilermakers football team =

American college football season

1950 Purdue Boilermakers football
- Conference: Big Ten Conference
- Record: 2–7 (1–4 Big Ten)
- Head coach: Stu Holcomb (4th season)
- MVP: James Janosek
- Captains: John Beletic; John Kerestes
- Home stadium: Ross–Ade Stadium

1950 Big Ten Conference football standings
	Conf.					Overall
Team	W		L		T	W		L		T
No. 9 Michigan $	4	–	1	–	1	6	–	3	–	1
No. 14 Ohio State	5	–	2	–	0	6	–	3	–	0
Wisconsin	5	–	2	–	0	6	–	3	–	0
No. 13 Illinois	4	–	2	–	0	7	–	2	–	0
Northwestern	3	–	3	–	0	6	–	3	–	0
Iowa	2	–	4	–	0	3	–	5	–	1
Minnesota	1	–	4	–	1	1	–	7	–	1
Indiana	1	–	4	–	0	3	–	5	–	1
Purdue	1	–	4	–	0	2	–	7	–	0
$ – Conference champion; Rankings from AP Poll

The 1950 Purdue Boilermakers football team was an American football team that represented Purdue University during the 1950 Big Ten Conference football season. In their fourth season under head coach Stu Holcomb, the Boilermakers compiled a 2–7 record, finished in a three-way tie for last place in the Big Ten Conference with a 1–4 record against conference opponents, and were outscored by their opponents by a total of 200 to 143.

Notable players from the 1950 Purdue team included end Leo Sugar.

== Schedule ==
Date	Opponent	Rank	Site	Result	Attendance	Source
September 30	at No. 5 Texas*		Memorial Stadium; Austin, TX	L 26–34	40,000	
October 7	at No. 1 Notre Dame*		Notre Dame Stadium; Notre Dame, IN	W 28–14	56,746	
October 14	Miami (FL)*	No. 9	Ross–Ade Stadium; West Lafayette, IN	L 14–20	32,000	
October 21	at Iowa		Iowa Stadium; Iowa City, IA	L 21–33	52,261	
October 28	No. 18 UCLA*^{†}		Ross–Ade Stadium; West Lafayette, IN	L 6–20	39,000	
November 4	at No. 20 Wisconsin		Camp Randall Stadium; Madison, WI	L 7–33	45,000	
November 11	Northwestern		Ross–Ade Stadium; West Lafayette, IN	L 14–19	30,000	
November 18	at Minnesota		Memorial Stadium; Minneapolis, MN	L 14–27	46,389	
November 25	Indiana		Ross–Ade Stadium; West Lafayette, IN (Old Oaken Bucket)	W 13–0	45,000	
*Non-conference game; ^{†}Homecoming; Rankings from AP Poll released prior to the game

== Roster ==
- John Beletic, T
- Ronald Bland, E
- Pete Brewster, E
- Robert Bringer, E
- Bill Bruner, T
- Herb Campfield, FB
- Bill Deem, G
- John Durham, HB
- Bernie Flowers, E
- Allen Hager, G
- Earl Heninger, HB
- Jack Houston, G
- Don Jackson, G
- Jim Janosek, T
- Curt Jones, HB
- Don Kasperan, FB
- John Kerestes, FB
- Philip Klezek, HB
- Clinton Knitz, C
- Mike Maccioli, HB
- Norman Montgomery, FB
- Bill Reed, C
- Dale Samuels, QB
- Stan Sawczuk, E
- Elmer Scallish, G
- Neil Schmidt, HB
- Dick Schnaible, QB
- Joe Skibinski, G
- Leo Sugar, E
- Glenn Young, FB
