= Don Stonesifer =

American football player (1927–2021)

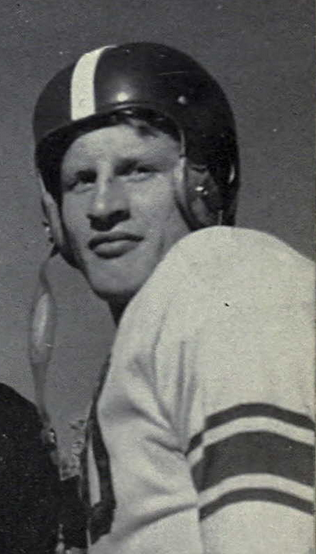
- Stonesifer in 1950

No. 80
- Position: Wide receiver

Personal information
- Born: January 29, 1927; Chicago, Illinois, U.S.
- Died: October 15, 2021 (aged 94); Bloomington, Illinois, U.S.
- Listed height: 6 ft 0 in (1.83 m)
- Listed weight: 200 lb (91 kg)

Career information
- High school: Carl Schurz (Chicago)
- College: Northwestern (1947–1950)
- NFL draft: 1951: 3rd round, 30th overall pick

Career history
- Chicago Cardinals (1951–1956)

Awards and highlights
- First-team All-American (1950); First-team All-Big Ten (1950)

Career NFL statistics
- Receptions: 231
- Receiving yards: 2,901
- Touchdowns: 14
- Stats at Pro Football Reference

Donald Humphrey Stonesifer (January 29, 1927 – October 15, 2021) was an American professional football wide receiver who played six seasons in the National Football League (NFL).

== NFL career statistics ==
Legend
**Bold**	Career high

Year	Team	Games		Receiving				
Year	Team	GP	GS	Rec	Yds	Avg	Lng	TD
1951	CRD	12	10	27	343	12.7	48	2
1952	CRD	12	12	54	617	11.4	26	0
1953	CRD	12	12	**56**	**684**	12.2	46	2
1954	CRD	12	11	44	607	13.8	39	3
1955	CRD	12	9	28	330	11.8	28	**5**
1956	CRD	12	12	22	320	**14.5**	**58**	2
Career		72	66	231	2,901	12.6	58	14
