= Bill Vohaska =

American football player (1929–2004)

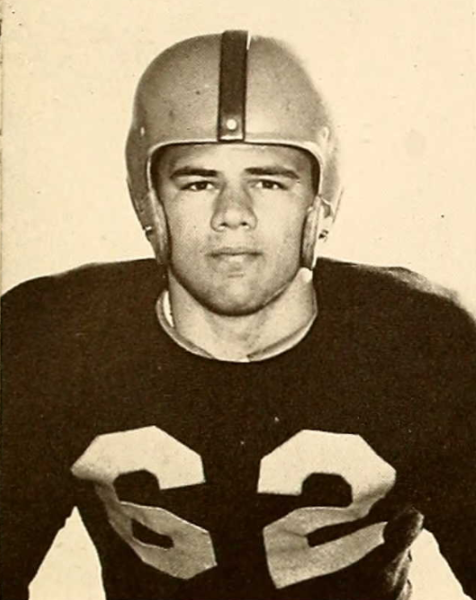
- Vohaska from 1950 Illio

Profile
- Positions: Center, linebacker

Personal information
- Born: May 17, 1929; Riverside, Illinois, U.S.
- Died: December 24, 2004 (aged 75); Venice, Florida, U.S.
- Listed weight: 180 lb (82 kg)

Career information
- High school: Cicero (IL) Morton
- College: Illinois

Awards and highlights
- First-team All-American (1950); First-team All-Big Ten (1950)

William John Vohaska (May 17, 1929 – December 24, 2004) was an American football player.

Vohaska was born in 1929 in Riverside, Illinois. He attended Morton High School in Cicero.

He played college football for the Illinois Fighting Illini football team at the center position from 1948 to 1950. He was selected as captain of the 1950 Illinois Fighting Illini football team that was ranked No. 11 in the final UPI poll. He was selected by the Associated Press as the first-team center on its 1950 College Football All-America Team. Illinois head coach Ray Eliot called Vohaska a "hustler and a perfectionist" and "the finest player I have ever worked with". Vohaska also competed for the Illinois wrestling team, but he forfeited his senior year of wrestling eligibility to participate in an all-star bowl game in Hawaii.

Vohaska later worked as a coach and teacher. He taught at Morton High School beginning in 1954 and later at Morton College. He also founded and operated the Riverside Day Camp in Riverside, Illinois.

Vohaska died in 2000 at a hospice home in Venice, Florida.
