= Don Dufek Sr. =

American football player and administrator (1929–2014)

Don Dufek
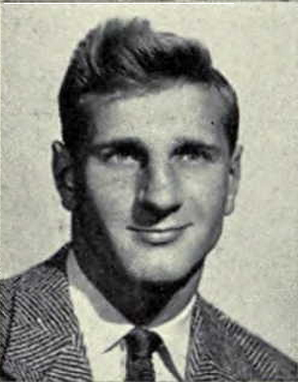
- Dufek Sr. from 1951 Michiganensian

Profile
- Position: Fullback

Personal information
- Born: May 28, 1929; Chicago, Illinois, U.S.
- Died: December 10, 2014 (aged 85); Ann Arbor, Michigan, U.S.

Career information
- College: University of Michigan

Awards and highlights
- National champion (1948); First-team All-Big Ten (1950)

Donald Edward Dufek Sr. (May 28, 1929 – December 10, 2014) was an American football player and athletic director at Grand Valley State University and Kent State University. He is the father of All-American football players Don, and Bill as well as Joe who all played in the National Football League (NFL).

== University of Michigan football player ==
Donald Edward Dufek was born on May 28, 1929. A native of Evanston, Illinois, Dufek was a fullback for the University of Michigan Wolverines football team from 1948 to 1950. He won the Meyer Morton Award in 1949 (given to the player who shows the greatest development and most promise as a result of the annual spring practice) and was chosen as Michigan's Most Valuable Player and All Big Ten in 1950.

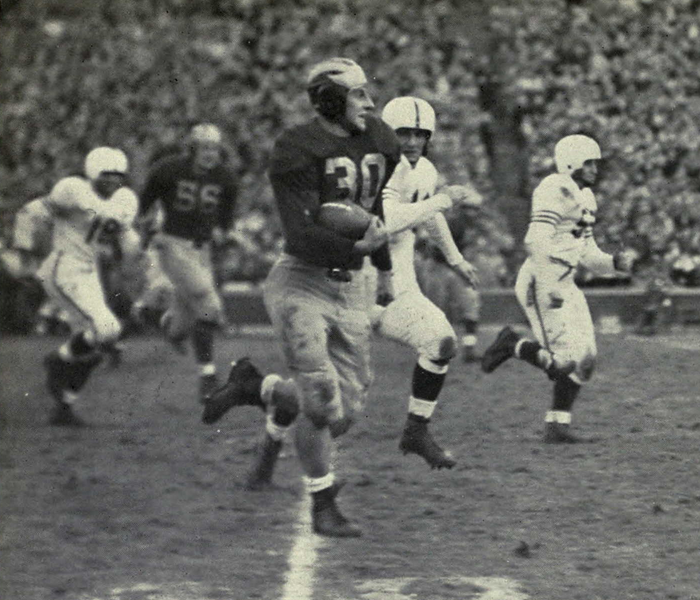
Don Dufek Sr. running with ball in 1950

In 1950, the Wolverines won the Big Ten Conference championship and beat Ohio State 9–3 in the famed Snow Bowl on November 25, 1950. The Snow Bowl was played in Columbus in a blizzard, at 10 degrees above zero, on an icy field, and with wind gusting over 30 miles per hour. U-M did not get a first down or complete a pass in the blizzard and rushed for only 27 yards, but won 9–3 on a touchdown and a safety, both off of blocked punts. Dufek recalled: "It was very cold. We kept our hands under our armpits in the huddle. Our center (Carl Kreager) didn't wear any gloves. You couldn't get up a head of steam for anything. It was bad news, period."

The 1950 Wolverines then advanced to the Rose Bowl where they beat the previously undefeated University of California Bears (9–0–1) by a score of 14–6. Michigan was held scoreless and trailed 6–0 after three quarters, but Dufek took over in the fourth quarter. Dufek ran for 113 yards in the game and scored two touchdowns in the final six minutes of the game. Dufek was named MVP of the 1951 Rose Bowl game and was selected by the Chicago Bears in the 17th round of the 1951 NFL draft.

== Athletic director at Grand Valley State and Kent State ==
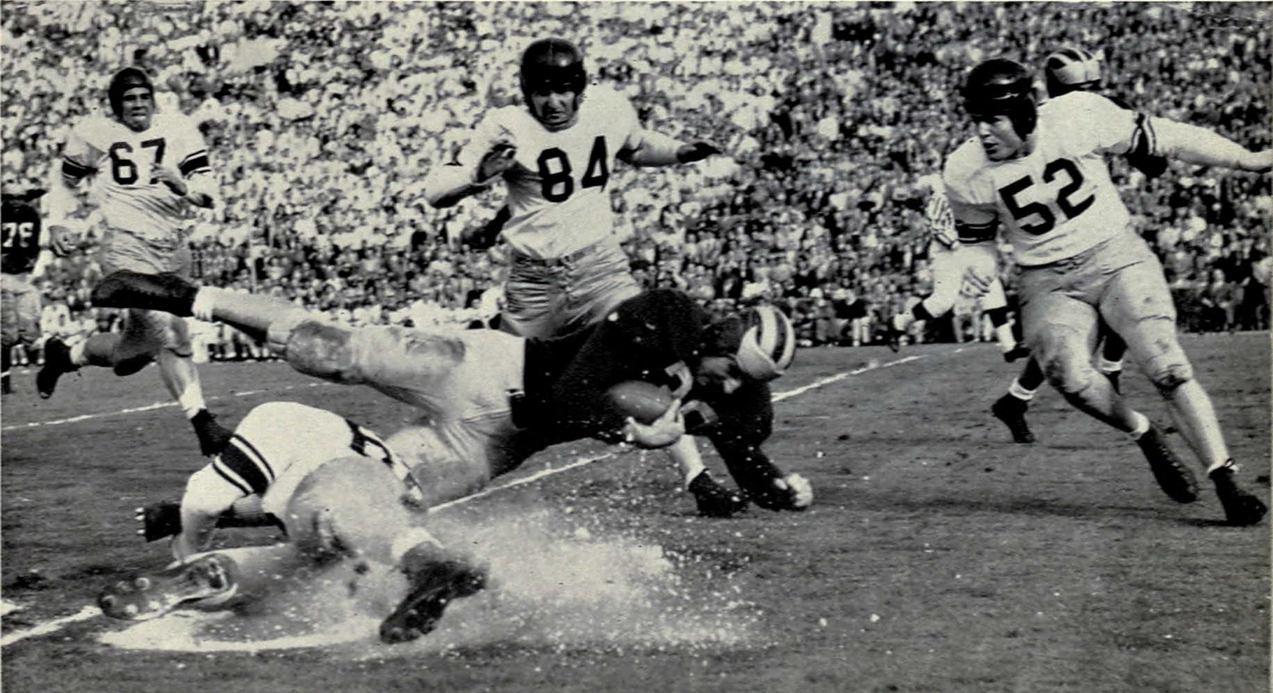
Dufek tackled in 1951 Rose Bowl

In 1972, Don Canham recommended Dufek for the position of athletic director at Grand Valley State University. Dufek served as Grand Valley State's second athletic director from 1972 to 1976. Dufek helped turn Grand Valley into a sports power. Grand Valley coach Jim Scott noted: "Don helped to start some of the football stadium project here and was the one who hired Jim Harkema as our head football coach, which was a pick that really got Laker football off and running."

Dufek recalled that Grand Valley had gone 0–13 in 1971 and 1972. "When I got there, they had never won a football game, which is hard to believe given the great success of football up there now. ... I hired Jim (Harkema) away from Triton College outside Chicago, and the program started to head in the right direction."

In June 1976, Dufek was named athletic director at Kent State University. Dufek held the A.D. position at Kent State until he resigned in April 1980.

== Honors and family ==
Dufek served as the director of the University of Michigan Alumni Association in the early 1970s.

In 2006, he was inducted in the University of Michigan Hall of Honor.

Two of Dufek's sons were All-American football players for the Michigan Wolverines: Bill, and Don Dufek Jr., who was one of the original members of the Seattle Seahawks. Another son, Joe, played quarterback at Yale and with the Buffalo Bills and San Diego Chargers. Joe's son, Mike, who was an All-Big Ten performer played his senior season for the Michigan Wolverines baseball team in 2010.

Dufek died on December 10, 2014, at the age of 85.

== See also ==
- 1950 Michigan Wolverines football team
- University of Michigan Athletic Hall of Honor
