= Chuck Ortmann =

American football player, coach and athletic director (1929–2018)

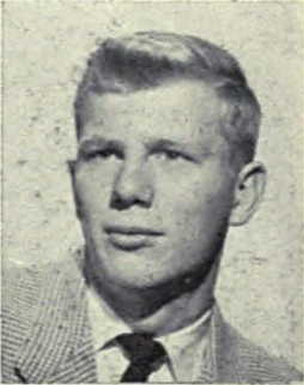
- Ortmann, 1951

No. 49, 10
- Position: Back

Personal information
- Born: June 1, 1929; Milwaukee, Wisconsin, U.S.
- Died: March 7, 2018 (aged 88); Gig Harbor, Washington, U.S.
- Listed height: 6 ft 1 in (1.85 m)
- Listed weight: 190 lb (86 kg)

Career information
- High school: Riverside University (Milwaukee)
- College: Michigan (1947–1950)
- NFL draft: 1951: 2nd round, 20th overall pick

Career history
- Pittsburgh Steelers (1951); Dallas Texans (1952)

Awards and highlights
- National champion (1948); 2× Second-team All-American (1948, 1949); 2× First-team All-Big Ten (1949, 1950); Second-team All-Big Nine (1948); Rose Bowl Hall of Fame, 2007

Career NFL statistics
- Passing attempts: 154
- Passing completions: 61
- Completion percentage: 39.6%
- TD–INT: 3–14
- Passing yards: 744
- Passer rating: 23.8
- Stats at Pro Football Reference

Charles H. Ortmann (June 1, 1929 – March 7, 2018) was an American professional football player who played for the University of Michigan Wolverines from 1948 to 1950 and in the National Football League (NFL) for the Pittsburgh Steelers in 1951 and the Dallas Texans in 1952.

== University of Michigan ==
Ortmann was raised in Milwaukee, Wisconsin. He turned down offers from the University of Wisconsin and nearby Marquette University, as well as coach Bear Bryant at the University of Kentucky, to attend the University of Michigan and play football for Fritz Crisler. Ortmann recalled: "My high school coach would say, 'Chuck, if you pick Michigan, you're picking the best. After you graduate, people will know you and remember you.' I made the right decision." He was a versatile player, starting at safety on defense and halfback on offense, as well as punting, placekicking, and returning punts and kickoffs. He was a starter as a sophomore for the undefeated 1948 Michigan Wolverines football team that won the National Championship. As a senior in 1950, he was responsible for 90% of Michigan's total offense. He was inducted into the Rose Bowl Hall of Fame on December 31, 2009.

=== The Snow Bowl ===
Ortmann is most known for his role in the famed 1950 Snow Bowl game against Ohio State, in which he punted 24 times in a blizzard for 723 yards – still a Michigan record. The weather conditions were so inclement that Michigan punted on first down for its first two plays from scrimmage, after concluding that the best strategy was to keep the slick ball on the other side of the field and in the hands of Ohio State. The strategy worked, as the game's only touchdown was scored after Ortman punted the ball out of bounds at the Ohio State six-yard line, Ohio State was forced to punt from deep in its own territory, and Tony Momsen recovered a blocked punt in the endzone. Ortmann recalled: "You and I would not have gone outside to get the newspaper on a day like that. But here we were, trying to play football." Michigan did not get a first down and had only 27 yards of total offense, while Ortman was 0 for 8 passing and gained only 9 yards in 10 rushing attempts. The fierce weather conditions stifled both offenses, and the Wolverines won 9–3 on a safety and Momsen's touchdown after the blocked punt. Interviewed about the Snow Bowl in 2006, Ortmann, then retired and living in Savannah, Georgia, recalled: "Twice during the game, playing as the safety, I couldn't see [Heisman Trophy winner] Vic Janowicz and his backfield, the snow was falling so heavily. Tony Momsen was our regular punter and as we were ready to go out, he said, 'Charlie, I don't feel like punting today, you punt.' I hadn't punted in three months. But the hero of that game was not Chuck Ortmann, it was Carl Kreager, our center. I just put my hands down and the ball was always there. I still remind him every time we talk, 'Carl, you never got enough credit for that game.' It was so boring. I have a film of the game, and I haven't watched it since, if that tells you something."

=== Other highlights ===
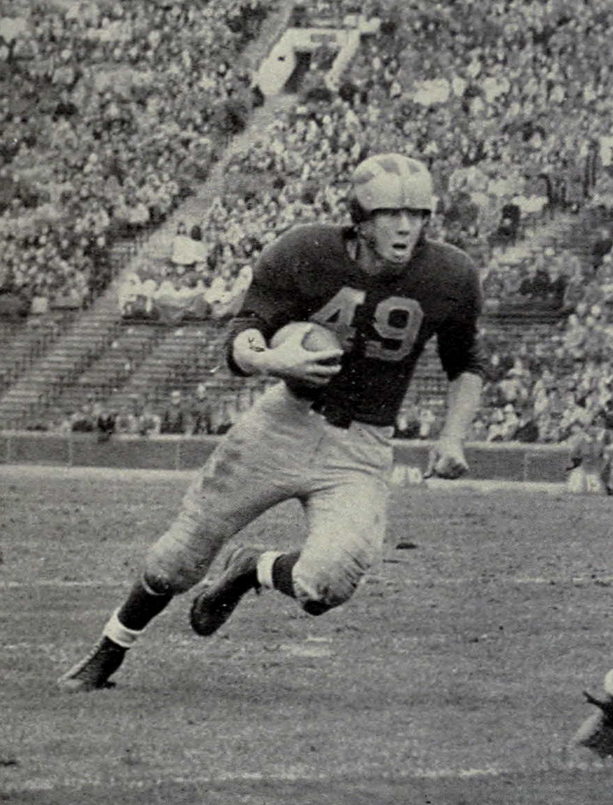
Ortmann running with the ball, 1950

Other highlights of Ortmann's playing career at Michigan include:

- Passing for 146 yards (15 for 19) in a 14–6 win over California, including six passes for 80 yards in the fourth quarter to lead Michigan's comeback from a 6–0 deficit, at the 1951 Rose Bowl game;
- Rushing for 115 yards and passing for another 92 (207 total yards) in a 14–7 win over Minnesota in the 1949 Little Brown Jug game;
- Passing for a career-high 186 yards passing in the 1950 Little Brown Jug game; and
- Returning a kickoff 82 yards against Purdue in 1949.

In his three years as a starter at Michigan, Ortmann had 2,078 yards passing (127 of 314) and 676 yards rushing (273 carries and six touchdowns). He was named an All-Big Ten halfback in 1950 and was also third-team All-American.

== Professional football ==
Ortmann was selected by the Pittsburgh Steelers as the 20th overall pick in the second round of the 1951 NFL draft and played in all 12 of the Steelers' games in 1951. He was the Steelers' leading passer in 1951, throwing 56 completions for 671 yards, three touchdowns and 13 interceptions. He also had 327 yards rushing, 62 yards receiving, and 62 yards on an interception return. Ortmann was also the Steelers' backup punter, kicking seven times for a 43.1 yard average, including a 72-yard punt. Ortmann was waived by the Steelers after the 1951 season and signed by the Dallas Texans in 1952. However, he injured his ankle and finished his playing career after playing only three games for the Texans, including two starts at quarterback.

== Later years, family and honors ==
After his football career ended, Ortmann accepted a job with a Chicago nonferrous metals company owned by former Michigan All-American Ernie Vick. Ortmann retired in 1991 and moved to Savannah, Georgia. He was married to his high school sweetheart from Milwaukee, Betty Ortmann; they had four children. They settled in Glen Ellyn, where Chuck established a youth football program. Together with Tom Hoffman, Chuck coached both the Churchill Blue Raiders and Glen Ellyn Rams. During the Rams' first year, Larry Krupp served as student manager of the team. In 2004, Ortmann was inducted into the University of Michigan Athletic Hall of Honor. Asked about the honor, Ortmann modestly said: "When fans start talking about putting an all-time Michigan team together, I think they're wrong to pick someone from the old era. I led the Big Ten one year with 750 yards running and passing. A guy like John Navarre has as many yards and passes in a game as I did in a season. Guys I played with were as good as they come, but nothing like the players today. Dominic Tomasi was a lineman at 5-8 and 180 pounds. They have cheerleaders that big today." Ortmann died on March 7, 2018, in Gig Harbor, Washington, at the age of 88.
