= Lynn Lynch =

American football player (1929–2022)

No. 75
- Position: Guard

Personal information
- Born: August 10, 1929; Indianapolis, Indiana, U.S.
- Died: June 30, 2022 (aged 92); Jacksonville, Florida, U.S.
- Listed height: 6 ft 2 in (1.88 m)
- Listed weight: 225 lb (102 kg)

Career information
- High school: Indianapolis Tech
- College: Illinois
- NFL draft: 1951: 5th round, 51st overall pick

Career history
- Chicago Cardinals (1951)

Awards and highlights
- Second-team All-Big Ten (1950)

Career NFL statistics
- Games played: 3
- Stats at Pro Football Reference

Lynn Edward Lynch (August 10, 1929 – June 30, 2022) was an American professional football guard who played for the Chicago Cardinals. He played college football at University of Illinois at Urbana–Champaign after attending Indianapolis Technical High School. Lynch died in Jacksonville, Florida on June 30, 2022, at the age of 92.
