= 1951 Rose Bowl =

American college football game

- 37th Rose Bowl Game
| Michigan Wolverines | California Golden Bears |
| (5–3–1) | (9–0–1) |
| Big Ten | Pacific Coast |
| 14 | 6 |
| Head coach: Bennie Oosterbaan | Head coach: Pappy Waldorf |
| AP / Coaches; 9 / 6 | AP / Coaches; 5 / 4 |
| | 1 | 2 | 3 | 4 | Total |
|---|---|---|---|---|---|
| Michigan | 0 | 0 | 0 | 14 | 14 |
| California | 0 | 6 | 0 | 0 | 6 |
- Date: January 1, 1951
- Season: 1950
- Stadium: Rose Bowl
- Location: Pasadena, California
- MVP: Don Dufek (Michigan FB)
- Favorite: California by 1 to 3 points
- Referee: Charles Brown (Pacific Coast; split crew: Pacific Coast, Big Ten)
- Attendance: 98,939

The 1951 Rose Bowl was the 37th edition of the college football bowl game, played at the Rose Bowl in Pasadena, California on Monday, January 1. The ninth-ranked Michigan Wolverines, champions of the Big Ten Conference, defeated the California Golden Bears, champions of the Pacific Coast Conference, 14–6.

Michigan fullback Don Dufek scored two touchdowns in the fourth quarter and was named the Player of the Game. With a record of 9–0–1, the Golden Bears were ranked fourth in the nation.

It was the Big Ten's fifth consecutive win in the Rose Bowl, and California's third straight loss.

== Teams ==
=== Michigan Wolverines ===
Michigan upset rival Ohio State 9–3 in the notorious Snow Bowl game, played in 21 inches (53 cm) of snow in Columbus.

=== California Golden Bears ===
This was California's third consecutive trip to the Rose Bowl and were slightly favored. Pete Schabarum broke a 77-yard run on the second play of the game, but a backfield-in-motion penalty nullified the score to stop the Cal momentum.

== Scoring ==
=== First quarter ===
No scoring

=== Second quarter ===
- California - Bob Cummings, 39-yard pass from Jim Marinos (Les Richter kick failed)

=== Third quarter ===
No scoring

=== Fourth quarter ===
- Michigan - Don Dufek, 1-yard run (Harry Allis kick)
- Michigan - Dufek, 7-yard run (Allis kick)

== Game notes ==
- Chuck Ortmann completed 15 of 19 passes for 146 yards for Michigan and Jim Marinos was 4 for 7 completions for 69 yards for Cal.
- This was Michigan's third victory in the Rose Bowl (1902, 1948, 1951) in as many attempts.
- California back Pete Schabarum became a member of the Los Angeles County Board of Supervisors in 1972.
- California's record in the Rose Bowl fell to 2–4–1; their next (and most recent) appearance was eight years away, also a loss.

== Aftermath ==
After this third consecutive loss by California, the Pacific Coast Conference enacted a "no-repeat" rule, similar to the Big Ten's. Future teams affected were UCLA in 1955 and Oregon State in 1958, and both resulted in wins for the Big Ten. With the PCC's dissolution in the spring of 1959, the succeeding AAWU (Big Five) abolished that rule, and Washington won the next two Rose Bowls in 1960 and 1961.

Although Minnesota appeared in consecutive Rose Bowls in 1961 and 1962, (both as "at-large" invitations, the latter after champion Ohio State declined), the Big Ten kept its rule until the early 1970s; the last team affected was Michigan State in 1967, when runner-up Purdue edged unranked USC by a point. The first Big Ten team to make a repeat appearance in the 1970s was Ohio State in 1974, the conference's only win in Pasadena that decade.
