= Bill Reichardt =

American football player (1930–2004)

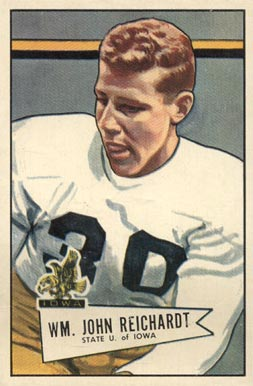
- Reichardt on a 1952 Bowman football card

No. 37
- Positions: Fullback, placekicker

Personal information
- Born: June 24, 1930; Iowa City, Iowa, U.S.
- Died: June 1, 2004 (aged 73); Des Moines, Iowa, U.S.
- Listed height: 5 ft 11 in (1.80 m)
- Listed weight: 210 lb (95 kg)

Career information
- High school: Iowa City
- College: Iowa (1948–1951)
- NFL draft: 1952: 7th round, 76th overall pick

Career history
- Green Bay Packers (1952)

Awards and highlights
- Chicago Tribune Silver Football (1951); 2× First-team All-Big Ten (1950, 1951)

Career NFL statistics
- Rushing yards: 121
- Rushing average: 3.1
- Receptions: 5
- Receiving yards: 18
- Touchdowns: 1
- Stats at Pro Football Reference

William John Reichardt (June 24, 1930 – June 1, 2004) was a fullback and placekicker in the National Football League (NFL) who played for the Green Bay Packers. Reichardt played collegiate ball for the University of Iowa before being drafted by Green Bay Packers in the seventh round of the 1952 NFL draft. He played professionally for one season, in 1952.

Reichardt subsequently opened a men's clothing store in Des Moines, Ia., and became a prominent businessman and community leader. An engaging speaker with homespun charm, Reichardt's business motto was that no sale was ever final and that if there was ever a problem with one of his suits, he would make sure to make things right. He died of cancer on June 1, 2004.

Born to Herb Reichardt on June 24, 1930, William "Bill" Reichardt attended Iowa City public schools until his graduation in 1948. In recognition for his high school football exploits, Reichardt received a place on the All-State football team in 1946 and 1947. Continuing to play football, he received a Bachelor of Science degree in economics from the University of Iowa in 1952.

After graduation, Reichardt spent one season with the Green Bay Packers and then joined the Air Force, where he served as a First Lieutenant for two years during the Korean War. He founded Reichardt's Inc.--a chain of men's clothing stores—and has been very active in community affairs. In addition, Reichardt started the Little All-American Football League in Des Moines and coached for 30 years.

In 1964 Reichardt was elected to the Iowa State Legislature where he served Polk County for two years in the Iowa House of Representatives; in 1966 won election to the Iowa State Senate, where he served four years. During his tenure in state government Reichardt sponsored the bill to resume an annual Iowa – Iowa State football game.

In 1994, Reichardt was a Democratic candidate for governor during the primary elections and in 1999 he circulated a petition to become a mayoral candidate for the City of Des Moines, but did not pursue the position.

== Legacy ==
Camerado Publishing released a novel entitled The Best Seller, written by Bill's son, Doug Reichardt and granddaughter, Katie Bishop. The novel chronicles Reichardt's early business career and the relationship principles which led to his notoriety in the community.
