= Snow Bowl (1950) =

The Snow Bowl
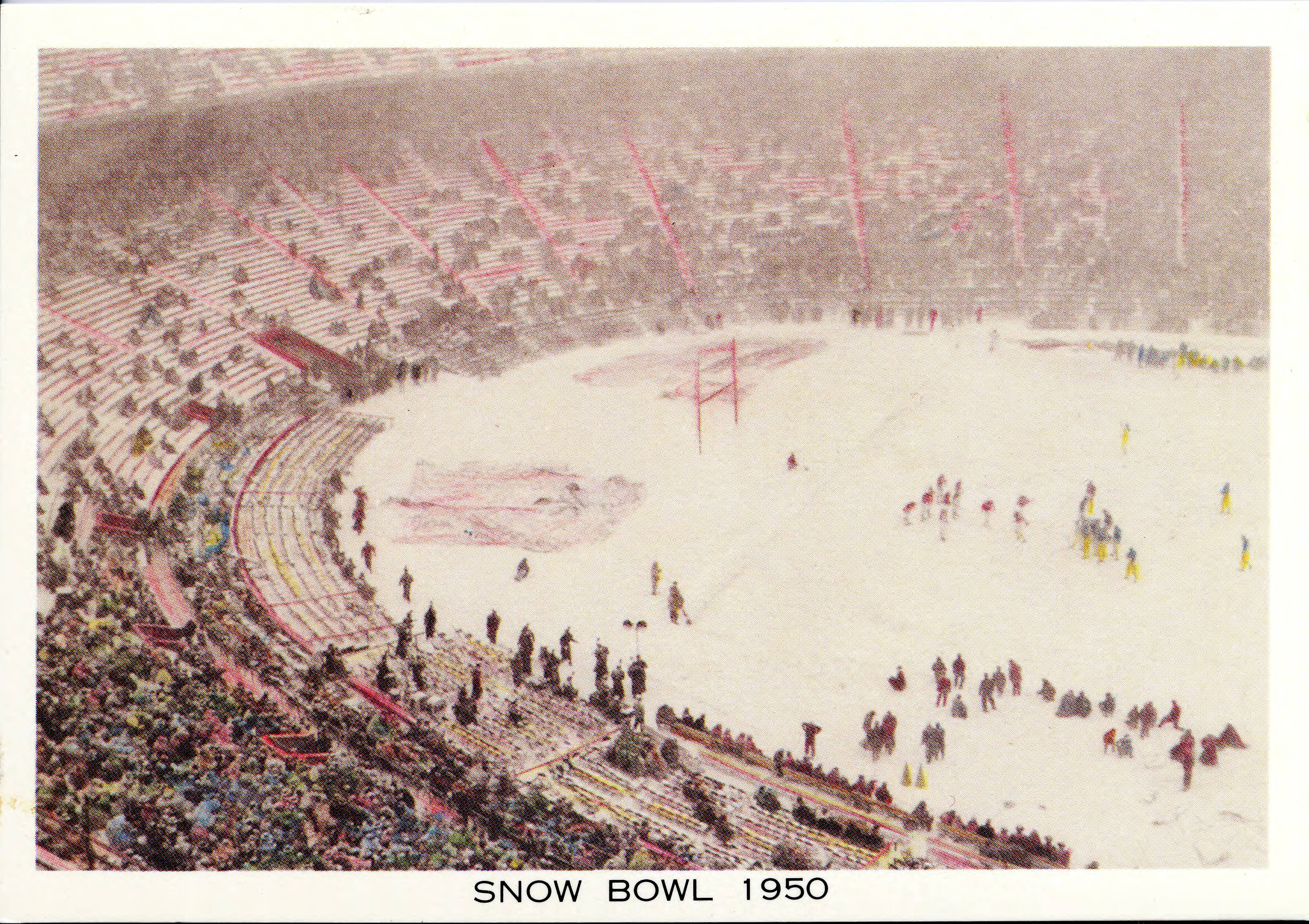
- Postcard for the game
Michigan Wolverines	Ohio State Buckeyes
(4–3–1)	(6–2)
9	3
Head coach: Bennie Oosterbaan	Head coach: Wes Fesler
	AP 8
	1	2	3	4	Total
Michigan	2	7	0	0	9
Ohio State	3	0	0	0	3
- Date: November 25, 1950
- Season: 1950
- Stadium: Ohio Stadium
- Location: Columbus, Ohio
- Attendance: 79,868

The Snow Bowl is the nickname of a college football game played on November 25, 1950, between the teams of the University of Michigan and Ohio State University. The Michigan Wolverines defeated the Ohio State Buckeyes, 9–3, earning the Big Ten Conference championship and a berth in the 1951 Rose Bowl. The game was one of the most noted in the storied history of the Michigan–Ohio State football rivalry.

== What was at stake ==
The Big Ten Conference football championship in the 1950 college football season was on the line. The Wolverines were playing also for a berth in the 1951 Rose Bowl game. Ohio State had gone the previous year; the Big Ten Conference had a no-repeat rule regarding the Rose Bowl representative at that time. If Michigan had lost this game, the likely Rose Bowl representative would have been second place Wisconsin, which finished with a 5–2 record. If the game had not been played, which was a proposal put forth at game time, Ohio State would have been the Big Ten champion.

== Game summary ==
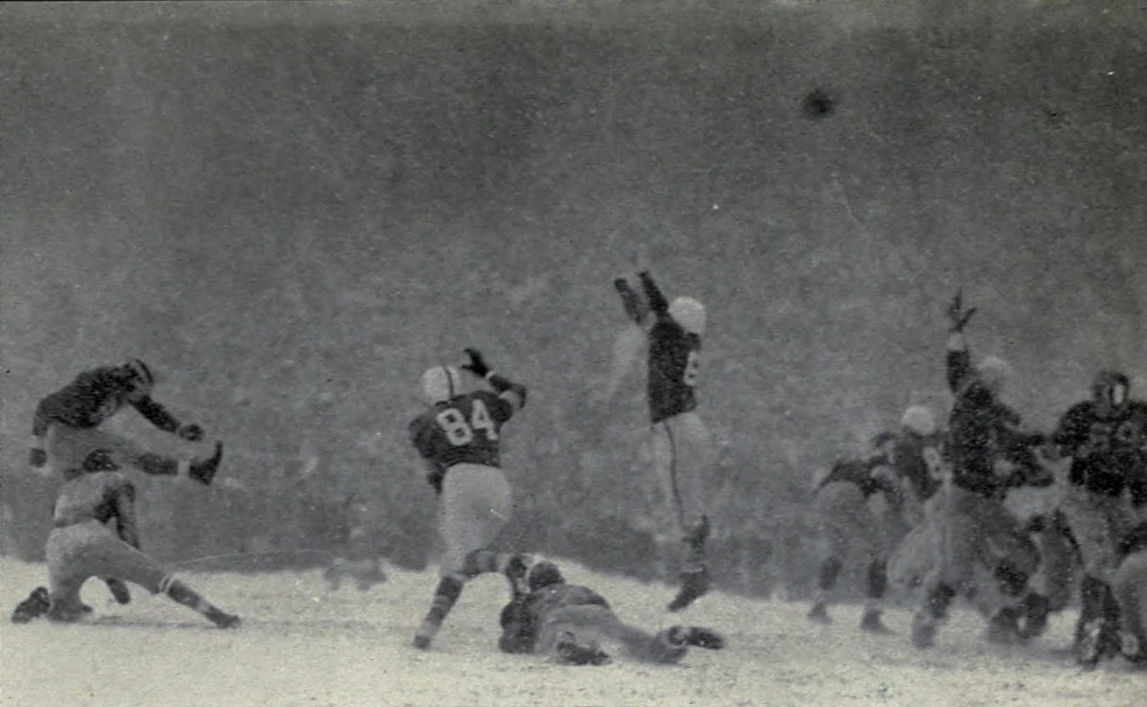
Harry Allis kicks the extra point after the game's only touchdown

The game was played at Ohio Stadium, in Columbus, Ohio, under severe weather that altered the normal playing of the game dramatically. The conditions were deplorable with the temperature at 10 degrees, winds gusting to 28 miles per hour out of the northwest and snow falling at two inches per hour. Snow banks lined the field, yard lines were obliterated and at times so, too, were the goal posts.

Before the game, Ohio State coach Wes Fesler and OSU athletic director Dick Larkins went to talk to Michigan athletic director Fritz Crisler and coach Bennie Oosterbaan about whether or not to play the game. Neither Fesler nor Oosterbaan wanted to play the game and Crisler indicated that Michigan would forfeit but would not reschedule the game. Larkins would not accept the forfeit and the game proceeded as scheduled.

The game was set to be played in front of 50,535 fans, some of whom built small bonfires in the stands to keep warm. Others sat with boxes over their heads to shield from the cold, with holes cut in to peer out. As the game was set to begin, grounds crews struggled to get the tarp off of the frozen field with four feet of snow on top of it. Local Boy Scouts and fans had to help with the tarps, finally removing them 2:21 hours late.

Michigan won the game 9–3, despite never getting a first down, failing on all nine pass attempts and punting 24 times. The Buckeyes had just three first downs, passed for a total of 18 yards, rushed for 16 yards (11 fewer than U-M) and punted 21 times, four of which were blocked. Overall, the teams punted 45 times during the game, sometimes on first down based on the strategy that both teams felt it better to have the ball in the hands of their opponents near the end zone and hope for a fumble of the slippery ball. In the end, Ohio State Halfback Vic Janowicz (who went on to win the Heisman Trophy) punted for 685 yards while Michigan's Chuck Ortmann punted for 723 yards.

The first score of the game came when Buckeye defensive guard Bob Momsen blocked an Ortmann punt and fell on it at the Michigan 8-yard line late in the first quarter of the game. The Buckeyes ran three straight running plays that went for minus-13 yards, putting the ball back to the 21. Janowicz was called upon to kick a 38-yard field goal into the swirling wind with the goal posts barely in view. He made it to give the Buckeyes a 3–0 lead. The kick would later be called one of the "Greatest Feats in American Sports" by a panel of sports writers.

In the second quarter, Michigan tackle Al Wahl blocked a Janowicz punt deep in Ohio State territory. The blocked ball rolled out of the back of the end zone for a safety, giving Michigan their first score of the game and trimming the Buckeyes' lead to 3–2. Michigan scored what proved to be the winning touchdown when with 20 seconds remaining in the first half, Janowicz attempted a third down punt, only to have Michigan's Tony Momsen (brother of Ohio State's Bob Momsen) break through the line and block the punt. Momsen fell on the ball in the end zone for a touchdown and U-M kicked the extra-point to go up 9–3. OSU coach Fesler could have run another play instead of punting on third down and let the clock expire on the half, but he feared a fumble (there were 10 that day) that would be recovered as a touchdown by Michigan.

Neither team would threaten to score again, and Michigan went on to win the game 9–3 and claim the conference title and chance to go to the Rose Bowl. The loss was Fesler's fourth straight to Michigan, and he submitted his resignation 18 days later. Fesler was replaced by Woody Hayes.

== Other uses ==
The nickname has also been more recently used to refer to various other games, including the 2000 Independence Bowl, a 43–41 overtime win by Mississippi State over Texas A&M. The 1992 meeting of Penn State and Notre Dame at Notre Dame Stadium is also sometimes referred to as the "Snow Bowl." Heavy snow slowed both teams, with Notre Dame coming from behind to win, 17–16.
