= 1950 Ohio State Buckeyes football team =

American college football season

1950 Ohio State Buckeyes football
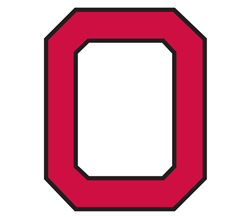
- Conference: Big Ten Conference

Ranking
- Coaches: No. 10
- AP: No. 14
- Record: 6–3 (5–2 Big Ten)
- Head coach: Wes Fesler (4th season)
- MVP: Vic Janowicz
- Captain: Henry Bill Trautwein
- Home stadium: Ohio Stadium

1950 Big Ten Conference football standings
	Conf.					Overall
Team	W		L		T	W		L		T
No. 9 Michigan $	4	–	1	–	1	6	–	3	–	1
No. 14 Ohio State	5	–	2	–	0	6	–	3	–	0
Wisconsin	5	–	2	–	0	6	–	3	–	0
No. 13 Illinois	4	–	2	–	0	7	–	2	–	0
Northwestern	3	–	3	–	0	6	–	3	–	0
Iowa	2	–	4	–	0	3	–	5	–	1
Minnesota	1	–	4	–	1	1	–	7	–	1
Indiana	1	–	4	–	0	3	–	5	–	1
Purdue	1	–	4	–	0	2	–	7	–	0
$ – Conference champion; Rankings from AP Poll

The 1950 Ohio State Buckeyes football team represented Ohio State University in the 1950 Big Nine Conference football season. The Buckeyes compiled a 6–3 record. The season finale against Michigan was the infamous game later known as the Snow Bowl as the teams combined for 45 punts in wintry weather. Ohio State outscored their opponents, 286–111, on the season, but head coach Wes Fesler's record against Michigan fell to 0–3–1.

== Schedule ==
Date	Opponent	Rank	Site	Result	Attendance	Source
September 30	No. 10 SMU*	No. 11	Ohio Stadium; Columbus, OH	L 27–32	80,672	
October 7	Pittsburgh*		Ohio Stadium; Columbus, OH	W 41–7	73,137	
October 14	at Indiana	No. 12	Memorial Stadium; Bloomington, IN	W 26–14	29,000	
October 21	at Minnesota	No. 9	Memorial Stadium; Minneapolis, MN	W 48–0	52,115	
October 28	Iowa	No. 6	Ohio Stadium; Columbus, OH	W 83–21	82,174	
November 4	at Northwestern	No. 4	Dyche Stadium; Evanston, IL	W 32–0	50,000	
November 11	No. 15 Wisconsin	No. 2	Ohio Stadium; Columbus, OH	W 19–14	81,535	
November 18	at No. 8 Illinois	No. 1	Memorial Stadium; Champaign, IL (Illibuck)	L 7–14	71,119	
November 25	Michigan	No. 8	Ohio Stadium; Columbus, OH (rivalry, Snow Bowl)	L 3–9	50,503	
*Non-conference game; Rankings from AP Poll released prior to the game

== Coaching staff ==
- Wes Fesler, head coach, fourth year

== Awards and honors ==
- Vic Janowicz, Heisman Trophy

== 1951 NFL draftees ==
Player	Round	Pick	Position	NFL club
Bob Momsen	7	80	Middle Guard	Detroit Lions
Bill Miller	26	305	Tackle	Green Bay Packers
