= Vic Janowicz =

American baseball and football player (1930–1996)

- Janowicz, circa 1951
- Born: Victor Felix Janowicz; February 26, 1930; Elyria, Ohio, U.S.
- Died: February 27, 1996 (aged 66); Columbus, Ohio, U.S.
- Football career

No. 43
- Position: Halfback

Personal information
- Listed height: 5 ft 9 in (1.75 m)
- Listed weight: 187 lb (85 kg)

Career information
- High school: Elyria
- College: Ohio State (1949–1951)
- NFL draft: 1952: 7th round, 79th overall pick

Career history
- Washington Redskins (1954–1955)

Awards and highlights
- Heisman Trophy (1950); UPI Player of the Year (1950); SN Player of the Year (1950); Unanimous All-American (1950); Second-team All-All-American (1951); Chicago Tribune Silver Football (1950); 2× First-team All-Big Ten (1950, 1951); Ohio State Buckeyes No. 31 retired

Career NFL statistics
- Rushing yards: 410
- Rushing average: 4.1
- Rushing touchdowns: 4
- Receptions: 12
- Receiving yards: 148
- Receiving touchdowns: 3
- Stats at Pro Football Reference
- College Football Hall of Fame
- Baseball career
- Catcher
- Batted: Right Threw: Right

MLB debut
- May 31, 1953, for the Pittsburgh Pirates

Last MLB appearance
- September 10, 1954, for the Pittsburgh Pirates

MLB statistics
- Batting average: .214
- Home runs: 2
- RBI: 10
- Stats at Baseball Reference

Teams
- Pittsburgh Pirates (1953–1954)

Victor Felix "Crash" Janowicz (February 26, 1930 – February 27, 1996) was an American football halfback and baseball catcher whose promising National Football League (NFL) career was cut short by a serious automobile accident in southern California. In 1950, he was awarded the Heisman Trophy and selected as the UPI College Football Player of the Year while a member of the Ohio State Buckeyes team. He went on to become the first Heisman Trophy winner to play major league baseball, a feat that Auburn Tigers halfback Bo Jackson duplicated 35 years later.

Janowicz was selected in the seventh round of the 1952 NFL draft and played professionally for the Washington Redskins in the 1954 and 1955 seasons. He was one of the few athletes in the post-World War II era to play in both the NFL and Major League Baseball, where he spent two seasons (1953-54) as a catcher and third baseman for the Pittsburgh Pirates. Janowicz was inducted into the College Football Hall of Fame in 1976.

At 5-foot-9, 187 pounds, Janowicz played bigger than his somewhat modest size on the gridiron. The fan favorite was known to run over defenders if he couldn't run around them, a bruising style that prompted local supporters and media to call him "Crash" before long.

== Early life ==
Janowicz was born and raised in Elyria, Ohio as son of Polish immigrants. He attended Holy Cross Elementary School and graduated from Elyria High School. The stretch of Seventh Street which runs along the south side of Elyria High is named Vic Janowicz Drive in his honor. In addition, a life-size painting of Janowicz hangs in the lobby of the school. The Little League Baseball field located on Wittenburg Ave in Elyria is named Vic Janowicz Park.

== College career ==
Janowicz starred at Ohio State University, where as a tailback in the single wing offense, he was among the first triple-threats in college football." The junior was awarded the Heisman Trophy in the 1950 season.

Said Woody Hayes, who coached Janowicz as a senior, "He was not only a great runner, but also passed, was a placekicker and punter, played safety on defense and was an outstanding blocker. Janowicz epitomized the so-called triple-threat football player.

== Professional career ==
After graduation from college, Janowicz passed up offers to play professional football in order to pursue a baseball career. He reached the major leagues with the Pittsburgh Pirates but hit only .214 over two seasons as a bench player. He returned to football with the Washington Redskins late in the 1954 season.

One year later, when Janowicz emerged as one of the best young players in the pro football, it appeared that he had made a wise career decision. League-wide, he ranked among the top 10 in points scored (88), touchdowns (seven), extra points (28), field goals (six) and field goal percentage (30.00). The second-place Redskins finished with an 8-4 record, their best in nine years.

In a 31-30 victory against the Philadelphia Eagles at Griffith Stadium that season, Janowicz was part of the three fastest three touchdowns in Redskins history. He caught a 19-yard pass for one TD then ran one yard for another in the third period. Janowicz later kicked a 20-yard field goal for what proved to be the margin of difference, as the home team scored 21 points in two minutes, 17 seconds to erase a 16-0 deficit.

== Tragic accident ==
Prior to the 1956 season, Janowicz suffered a severe brain injury in a two-car crash that left him partially paralyzed on the left side and ultimately ended his career as a professional athlete.

After a 39-21 win over the Rams in an exhibition game on Aug. 19 at the Los Angeles Coliseum, Janowicz attended a victory celebration at the home of Redskins teammate Gene Brito near San Bernardino, approximately 90 miles from the site of the game. On his way back to the team training facility at Occidental College, Janowicz sustained severe brain trauma, lacerations and bruises when the car driven by 21-year-old student nurse Barbara Wagner swerved out of control and struck a utility pole. Teammate Al Dorow suffered a back injury in the accident. The victims were taken to Hollywood Presbyterian Hospital for treatment and observation.

Janowicz returned to Ohio State in Columbus, Ohio to begin a rehabilitation program, but when his paralysis and occasional memory lapses lingered for nearly two years, it ended any hope for a return to the gridiron.

== Post-playing career ==
Janowicz eventually recovered well enough to broadcast Ohio State football games. Later he worked as an account executive at a Columbus manufacturing firm and as an administrative assistant to the state auditor.

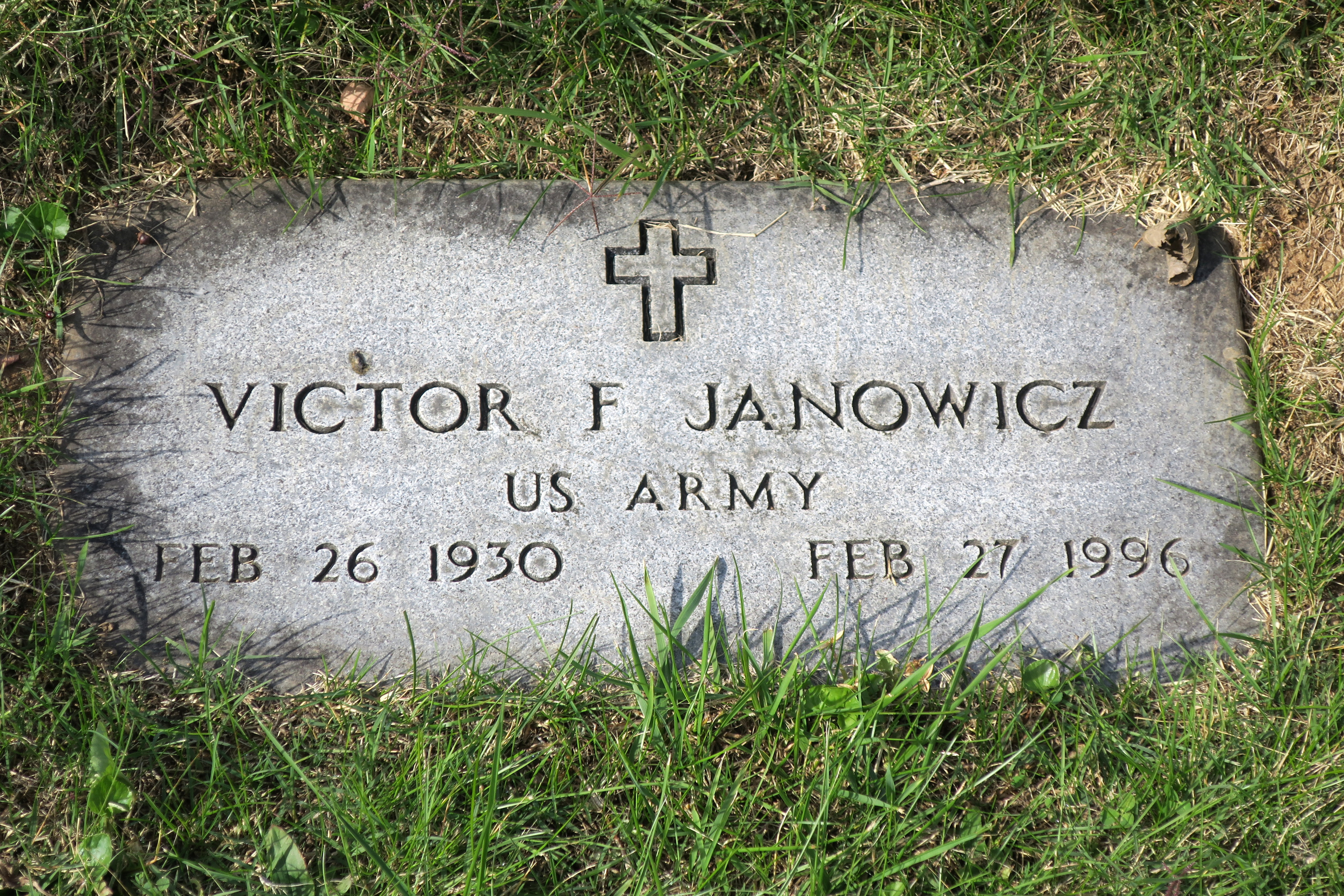
Janowicz's grave at St. Joseph Cemetery (Lockbourne, Ohio)

He died of cancer in Columbus on February 27, 1996, a day after his 66th birthday. He is buried at Saint Joseph Cemetery in Lockbourne, Ohio.
