= 1949 Big Nine Conference football season =

- Sport: American football
- Number of teams: 9
- Top draft pick: Clayton Tonnemaker
- Co-champions: Ohio State, Michigan
- Season MVP: Red Wilson

Football seasons
- ← 1948 1950 →

1949 Big Nine Conference football standings
	Conf.					Overall
Team	W		L		T	W		L		T
No. 6 Ohio State +	4	–	1	–	1	7	–	1	–	2
No. 7 Michigan +	4	–	1	–	1	6	–	2	–	1
No. 8 Minnesota	4	–	2	–	0	7	–	2	–	0
Wisconsin	3	–	2	–	1	5	–	3	–	1
Illinois	3	–	3	–	1	3	–	4	–	2
Iowa	3	–	3	–	0	4	–	5	–	0
Northwestern	3	–	4	–	0	4	–	5	–	0
Purdue	2	–	4	–	0	4	–	5	–	0
Indiana	0	–	6	–	0	1	–	8	–	0
+ – Conference co-champions; Rankings from AP Poll

The 1949 Big Nine Conference football season was the 54th season of college football played by the member schools of the Big Nine Conference (also known as the Western Conference and the Big Ten Conference) and was a part of the 1949 college football season.

Ohio State and Michigan tied for the 1949 Big Ten championship. Ohio State, under head coach Wes Fesler, compiled a 7–1–2 record and was ranked No. 6 in the final AP Poll. The Buckeyes defeated California in the 1950 Rose Bowl by a 17–14 score. Center Jack Lininger was selected as the team's most valuable player.

Michigan, under head coach Bennie Oosterbaan, compiled a 6–2–1 record and was ranked No. 7 in the final AP Poll. The Wolverines had a 25-game win streak broken with a loss to Army on October 8, 1949. Halfback Dick Kempthorn was selected as the team's most valuable player, and tackle Alvin Wistert was a consensus first-team All-American.

Minnesota, under head coach Bernie Bierman, finished in third place, compiled a 7–2 record, led the conference in both scoring offense (25.7 points per game) and scoring defense (8.9 points allowed per game), and was ranked No. 8 in the final AP Poll. Bud Grant and John Lundin were selected as the team's most valuable players. Tackle Leo Nomellini and center Clayton Tonnemaker were both consensus first-team All-Americans.

== Preseason ==
After the University of Chicago formally withdrew from the Big Ten Conference in 1946, conference officials began considering other schools to fill the vacancy. In December 1948, conference officials voted unanimously to admit Michigan State College, selecting the Spartans over a competing bid from the University of Pittsburgh. The decision was certified in May 1949, with Spartans' participation slated to begin in the fall of 1950 with the exception of football where their participation was delayed until 1953.

There was one coaching change between the 1948 and 1949 seasons. In December, 1948, Harry Stuhldreher resigned as Wisconsin's head football coach, though he retained his job as athletic director. In January, 1949, Wisconsin hired Ivy Williamson as its new head coach. Williamson had been a star football player at Michigan in the early 1930s and the head football coach at Lafayette from 1947 to 1948.

== Season overview ==
=== Results and team statistics ===
Conf. Rank	Team	Head coach	AP final	AP high	Overall record	Conf. record	PPG	PAG	MVP
1 (tie)	Ohio State	Wes Fesler	#6	#5	7–1–2	4–1–1	20.7	13.6	Jack Lininger
1 (tie)	Michigan	Bennie Oosterbaan	#7	#1	6–2–1	4–1–1	15.0	9.4	Dick Kempthorn
3	Minnesota	Bernie Bierman	#8	#3	7–2	4–2	**25.7**	**8.9**	Bud Grant; John Lundin
4	Wisconsin	Ivy Williamson	NR	NR	5–3–1	3–2–1	23.0	14.3	**Red Wilson**
5	Illinois	Ray Eliot	NR	NR	3–4–2	3–3–1	16.6	15.6	Johnny Karras
6 (tie)	Iowa	Eddie Anderson	NR	#15	4–5	3–3	20.4	27.4	Jack Dittmer
7	Northwestern	Robert Voigts	NR	#13	4–5	3–4	15.2	17.3	Don Burson; Gaspar Perricone
8	Purdue	Stu Holcomb	NR	NR	4–5	2–4	13.2	15.0	Lou Karras
9	Indiana	Bo McMillin	NR	NR	1–8	0–6	13.0	28.2	Nick Sebek

Key
AP final = Team's rank in the final AP Poll of the 1949 season
AP high = Team's highest rank in the AP Poll throughout the 1949 season
PPG = Average of points scored per game
PAG = Average of points allowed per game
MVP = Most valuable player as voted by players on each team as part of the voting process to determine the winner of the Chicago Tribune Silver Football trophy; trophy winner in bold

=== Regular season ===
==== September 24 ====
On September 24, 1949, the Big Ten football teams played one conference game and seven non-conference games. The non-conference games resulted in five wins and two losses.

- Ohio State 35, Missouri 34. Ohio State opened its season with a 35–34 victory over Missouri in front of a crowd of 66,510 at Ohio Stadium in Columbus, Ohio. In his debut for the Buckeyes, Ray Hamilton, an African-American player from Canton, Ohio, rushed for 111 yards on five carries, caught five passes for 118 yards, and scored two touchdowns. On defense, the Buckeyes gave up more than 540 yards (284 rushing and 257 passing). Missouri missed a field goal with three second left in the game.
- Michigan 7, Michigan State 3. Michigan defeated Michigan State, 7–3, before a crowd of 97,239 at Michigan Stadium in Ann Arbor, Michigan. Michigan State, playing with an unorthodox eight-man line, held Michigan to 89 rushing yards. Michigan's only score came on a touchdown pass from Bill Putich to Irv Wisniewski. Halfback Lynn Chandnois played every play for the Spartans.
- Minnesota 48, Washington 20. Minnesota defeated Washington, 48-20, before a crowd of 58,113 at Memorial Stadium in Minneapolis. The crowd was the largest opening crowd in Minneapolis to that date. Hugh McElhenny, playing in his first game at Washington, returned the opening kickoff 96 yards for a touchdown, but Minnesota rallied back with four touchdowns in the second quarter and one each in the other three quarters.
- Wisconsin 41, Marquette 0. Wisconsin routed Marquette, 41–0, before a crowd of 42,000 at Camp Randall Stadium in Madison, Wisconsin. Wisconsin tallied 304 rushing yards and 169 passing yards.
- UCLA 41, Iowa 25. UCLA end Bob Wilkinson caught two touchdown passes as UCLA defeated Iowa, 41–25, before a crowd of 43,510 at Iowa Stadium in Iowa City.
- Northwestern 20, Purdue 6. In the first conference game of the season, Northwestern, the 1949 Rose Bowl champion, defeated Purdue, 20-6, before a crowd of 48,000 at Dyche Stadium in Evanston, Illinois.
- Notre Dame 49, Indiana 6. Indiana lost to Notre Dame, 49-6, at Notre Dame Stadium. Notre Dame extended its unbeaten streak to 29 games and went on to a 10-0 and a national championship.
- Illinois 20, Iowa State 20. Illinois and Iowa State played to a 20-20 tie before a crowd of 31,106 at Memorial Stadium at Champaign, Illinois.

==== October 1 ====
On October 1, 1949, the Big Ten played three conference games and three non-conference games. The non-conference games resulted in two wins and a loss, giving the Big Ten a 7-3 record in non-conference games.

- Ohio State 46, Indiana 7.
- Michigan 27, Stanford 7. Michigan (ranked No. 2 in the AP Poll) defeated Stanford, 27–7, before a crowd of 88,000 at Stanford Stadium in Stanford, California. The crowd was the largest to that time to watch an inter-sectional game at Stanford. The win was the 25th in a row for Michigan, dating back to the 1946 season. Michigan out-gained Stanford in rushing yards, 264 to 95.
- Minnesota 28, Nebraska 6.
- Illinois 13, Wisconsin 13.
- Iowa 21, Purdue 7
- Pittsburgh 16, Northwestern 7.

==== October 8 ====
On October 8, 1949, the Big Ten played two conference games and five non-conference games. The non-conference games resulted in one win and four losses, giving the Big Ten an 8-7 record in non-conference games.

- Ohio State 13, USC 13.
- Army 21, Michigan 7. Michigan (ranked No. 1 in the AP Poll) lost to Earl Blaik's Army Cadets, 21-7, before a crowd of 97,239 at Michigan Stadium. Chuck Ortmann, the leader of Michigan's passing attack, suffered a concussion on the second play of the game, was carried off the field on a stretcher, and did not return to the game. Without Ortmann, Michigan was able to complete only three of 23 passes. With Michigan's passing game impaired, Army played six men at the line to stop Michigan's rushing attack. The Wolverines were unable to score until the fourth quarter when Don Dufek, Sr. scored on a short touchdown run. The loss snapped Michigan's 25-game winning streak dating back to 1946. The streak was the longest in college football since Cornell's 26-game win streak from 1921 to 1924.
- Minnesota 21, Northwestern 7.
- California 35, Wisconsin 20.
- Illinois 20, Iowa 14.
- TCU 13, Indiana 6.
- Notre Dame 35, Purdue 12.

==== October 15 ====
On October 15, 1949, the Big Ten played three conference games and three non-conference games. The non-conference games resulted in two wins and one loss, giving the Big Ten a 10-8 record in non-conference games.

- Minnesota 27, Ohio State 0. Minnesota shut out Ohio State, 27-0, before a capacity crowd of 82,111 at Ohio Stadium in Columbus. The crowd was the third largest in the history of Ohio Stadium to that point. Buckeyes were handicapped by the loss of Vic Janowicz and Dick Schnittker who were injured the prior week against USC. Minnesota scored touchdowns on a 14-yard run by Billy Bye in the first quarter, a 10-yard pass from Dale Warner to Dick Gregory, and a 20-yard pass from Bye to Jim Malosky.
- Northwestern 21, Michigan 20. Northwestern defeated Michigan, 21-20, before a capacity crowd of 55,000 at Dyche Stadium in Evanston. The game marked the first time Michigan had lost consecutive games in 10 years and Northwestern's first triumph over Michigan since 1937. Harry Allis kicked two extra points, but missed another that gave Northwestern its margin of victory.
- Wisconsin 48, Navy 13.
- Iowa 35, Indiana 9.
- Missouri 27, Illinois 20.
- Purdue 14, Miami (FL) 0.

==== October 22 ====
On October 22, 1949, the Big Ten played four conference games and one non-conference game. The non-conference game was a win, giving the Big Ten an 11-8 record against non-conference opponents.

- Ohio State 21, Wisconsin 0.
- Michigan 14, Minnesota 7.
- Iowa 28, Northwestern 21.
- Indiana 48, Pittsburgh 14.
- Illinois 19, Purdue 0.

==== October 29 ====
On October 29, 1949, the Big Ten played four conference games and one non-conference game. The non-conference game was a win, giving the Big Ten a 12-8 record against non-conference opponents.

- Ohio State 24, Northwestern 7.
- Michigan 13, Illinois 0.
- Purdue 13, Minnesota 7.
- Wisconsin 30, Indiana 14.
- Iowa 34, Oregon 31.

==== November 5 ====
On November 5, 1949, the Big Ten played four conference games and one non-conference game. The non-conference game was a win, giving the Big Ten a 13-8 record against non-conference opponents.

- Ohio State 14, Pittsburgh 10.
- Michigan 20, Purdue 12.
- Minnesota 24, Iowa 7.
- Wisconsin 14, Northwestern 6.
- Illinois 33, Indiana 14.

==== November 12 ====
On November 12, 1949, the Big Ten schools played three conference games and two non-conference games. The non-conference games both resulted in wins, giving the Big Ten a 15-8 record against non-conference opponents. Minnesota had a bye week.

- Ohio State 30, Illinois 17.
- Michigan 20, Indiana 7.
- Wisconsin 35, Iowa 13.
- Northwestern 39, Colgate 20.
- Purdue 41, Marquette 7

==== November 19 ====
On November 19, 1949, the Big Ten played four conference games and one non-conference game. The non-conference game was a loss.

- Michigan 7, Ohio State 7. Michigan and Ohio State played before a crowd of 97,239 at Michigan Stadium with the conference title at stake. The teams played to a 7-7 tie, resulting in a tie for the conference championship. Michigan scored in the first quarter on a touchdown pass from Wally Teninga to Leo Koceski. In the fourth quarter, Ohio State scored on a short run by Fred Morrison and missed the extra point on its first attempt. However, an offside penalty against Michigan end Ozzie Clark gave Ohio State a second attempt at the extra point, which it converted. Because Michigan had played in the 1949 Rose Bowl, Ohio State won the conference's bid to play in the 1950 Rose Bowl.
- Minnesota 14, Wisconsin 6. In a battle for third place in the conference, Minnesota defeated Wisconsin, 14-6, before a crowd of 64,110 in Minneapolis. Wisconsin fullback Gene Evans returned a punt 61 yards for a touchdown in the second quarter. In the third quarter, Minnesota halfback George Hudak threw a touchdown pass to Bud Hausken. Dick Gregory ran for Minnesota's second touchdown in the fourth quarter.
- Notre Dame 28, Iowa 7. Notre Dame extended its unbeaten streak to 36 games with a 28-7 victory over Iowa before a crowd of 56,790 at Notre Dame Stadium.
- Northwestern 9, Illinois 7. Northwestern defeated Illinois, 9-7, before a homecoming crowd of 67,872 at Memorial Stadium in Champaign. Northwestern's senior quarterback Don Burson, playing in his final college game, kicked a game-winning field goal with three minutes remaining in the game; Burson had never before attempted a field goal in his life.
- Purdue 14, Indiana 6. In the annual battle for the Old Oaken Bucket, Purdue defeated Indiana, 14-6, before a crowd of almost 34,000 at Memorial Stadium in Bloomington. Fullback John Kerestes scored both Purdue touchdowns on short runs. Purdue rushed for 327 yards.

=== Bowl games ===
On January 2, 1950, Ohio State defeated California, 17–14, in the 1950 Rose Bowl. The game's most valuable player was Fred "Curly" Morrison of Ohio State. The game was played on January 2, because the first fell on a Sunday.

== All-conference players ==
The following players were picked by the Associated Press (AP) and/or the United Press (UP) as first-team players on the 1949 All-Big Nine Conference football team.

Position	Name	Team	Selectors
End	Bud Grant	Minnesota	AP, UP
End	Bob Wilson	Wisconsin	AP, UP
Tackle	Leo Nomellini	Minnesota	AP, UP
Tackle	Alvin Wistert	Michigan	AP, UP
Guard	Lloyd Heneveld	Michigan	AP, UP
Guard	Jack Lininger	Ohio State	AP
Guard	Charles Gottfried	Illinois	UP
Center	Clayton Tonnemaker	Minnesota	AP, UP
Quarterback	Don Burson	Northwestern	AP, UP
Halfback	Chuck Ortmann	Michigan	AP, UP
Halfback	Johnny Karras	Illinois	AP, UP
Fullback	Gerry Krall	Ohio State	AP
Fullback	Bob Momsen	Ohio State	UP

== All-Americans ==
At the end of the 1949 season, Big Ten players secured three of the consensus first-team picks for the 1949 College Football All-America Team. The Big Ten's consensus All-Americans were:

Position	Name	Team	Selectors
Center	Clayton Tonnemaker	Minnesota	All-America Board (AAB), AP, UP, COL, FWAA, TSN, NEA, NYS, WCFF, All-Players
Tackle	Leo Nomellini	Minnesota	AAB, UP, COL, TSN, NEA, WCFF
Tackle	Alvin Wistert	Michigan	AAB, UP, TSN, INS, WCFF

Other Big Ten players who were named first-team All-Americans by at least one selector were:

Position	Name	Team	Selectors
Tackle	Robert Wahl	Michigan	FWAA, NEA

== 1950 NFL draft ==
The following Big Nine players were among the first 100 players selected in the 1950 NFL draft:

Name	Position	Team	Round	Overall pick
Clayton Tonnemaker	Center	Minnesota	1	4
Fred "Curly" Morrison	Back	Ohio State	1	10
Leo Nomellini	Tackle	Minnesota	1	11
Bud Grant	End	Minnesota	1	14
Jack Jennings	Tackle	Ohio State	2	21
Gordy Saltau	End	Minnesota	3	30
Art Murakowski	Back	Northwestern	3	31
Lou Karras	Tackle	Purdue	3	32
Earl Murray	Guard	Purdue	4	41
Red Wilson	Center	Wisconsin	4	52
Floyd Jaszewski	Tackle	Minnesota	6	70
Gaspar Perricone	Back	Northwestern	6	72
Ken Gorgal	Back	Purdue	6	78
Harry Szulborski	Back	Purdue	8	95
Ralph McAllister	Back	Minnesota	8	96
