= 1949 Michigan Wolverines football team =

American college football season

1949 Michigan Wolverines football
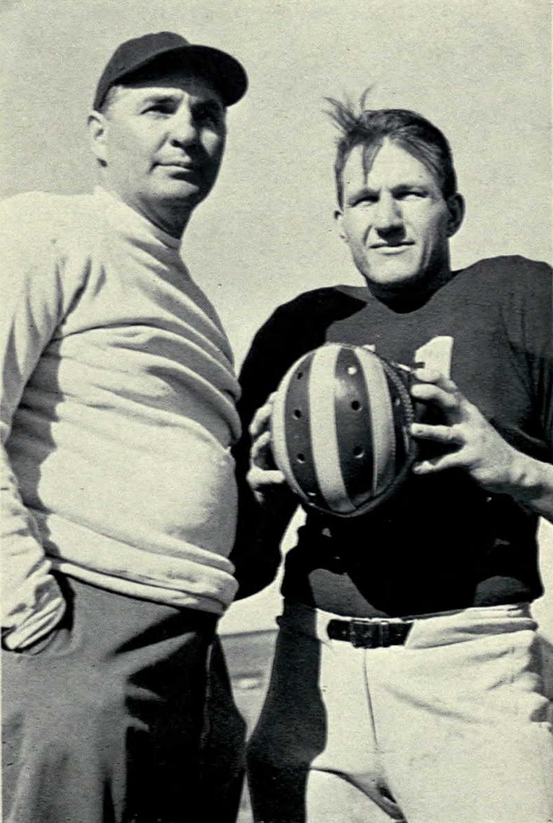

Big Nine co-champion
- Conference: Big Nine Conference

Ranking
- AP: No. 7
- Record: 6–2–1 (4–1–1 Big Nine)
- Head coach: Bennie Oosterbaan (2nd season)
- MVP: Dick Kempthorn
- Captain: Alvin Wistert
- Home stadium: Michigan Stadium

1949 Big Nine Conference football standings
	Conf.					Overall
Team	W		L		T	W		L		T
No. 6 Ohio State +	4	–	1	–	1	7	–	1	–	2
No. 7 Michigan +	4	–	1	–	1	6	–	2	–	1
No. 8 Minnesota	4	–	2	–	0	7	–	2	–	0
Wisconsin	3	–	2	–	1	5	–	3	–	1
Illinois	3	–	3	–	1	3	–	4	–	2
Iowa	3	–	3	–	0	4	–	5	–	0
Northwestern	3	–	4	–	0	4	–	5	–	0
Purdue	2	–	4	–	0	4	–	5	–	0
Indiana	0	–	6	–	0	1	–	8	–	0
+ – Conference co-champions; Rankings from AP Poll

The 1949 Michigan Wolverines football team represented the University of Michigan in the 1949 Big Nine Conference football season. In their second season under head coach Bennie Oosterbaan, the Wolverines compiled a 6–2–1 record (4–1–1 against conference opponents), tied with Ohio State for the Big Ten Conference championship, were ranked No. 7 in the final AP Poll, and outscored all opponents by a combined total of 135 to 85. On October 8, 1949, the Wolverines had their 25-game winning streak broken in 21–7 loss to Army.

On offense, the 1949 team averaged 12.3 points, 176.8 rushing yards, 94.9 passing yards, and 272.3 yards of total offense per game. In rushing yards per carry, the team averaged only 4.3 yards per carry, the lowest season average in team history, reaching a low against Army with only 0.7 yards per rushing attempt against (the second lowest single-game average in team history). Chuck Ortmann led the team with 956 yards of total offense, including 627 passing yards. Ortmann also rushed for 115 yards on 16 carries against Minnesota. Other statistical leaders on offense included Don Dufek with 392 rushing yards and 30 points scored and Harry Allis with 23 receptions for 338 yards.

On defense, the team allowed an average of 9.4 points, 116.4 rushing yards, 98.7 passing yards, and 215.1 yards of total offense per game. Chuck Lentz set a Michigan school record with nine interceptions in 1949. His record was broken by Tom Curtis in 1968. The defense as a whole recorded 25 interceptions, tied for second best in school history. Michigan allowed zero first downs by rushing in its game against Indiana.

Tackles Alvin Wistert and Robert Wahl received first-team All-America honors. Wistert, Lloyd Heneveld, and Chuck Ortmann received first-team All-Big Nine honors. Dick Kempthorn, who contributed at fullback and linebacker, was selected as the team's most valuable player.

The team played its home games at Michigan Stadium in Ann Arbor, Michigan. Prior to the 1949 season, Michigan replaced the stadium's wooden bleachers with permanent steel stands and increased the seating capacity to 97,239. Michigan led the NCAA in 1949 with average home attendance of 93,894 (563,363 in six games).

== Schedule ==
Date	Opponent	Rank	Site	Result	Attendance
September 24	Michigan State*		Michigan Stadium; Ann Arbor, MI (rivalry)	W 7–3	97,239
October 1	at Stanford*		Stanford Stadium; Stanford, CA	W 27–7	87,123
October 8	No. 7 Army*	No. 1	Michigan Stadium; Ann Arbor, MI	L 7–21	97,239
October 15	at Northwestern	No. 7	Dyche Stadium; Evanston, IL (rivalry)	L 20–21	54,816
October 22	No. 3 Minnesota^{†}	No. 12	Michigan Stadium; Ann Arbor, MI (Little Brown Jug)	W 14–7	97,239
October 29	at Illinois	No. 6	Memorial Stadium; Champaign, IL (rivalry)	W 13–0	71,119
November 5	Purdue	No. 5	Michigan Stadium; Ann Arbor, MI	W 20–12	95,207
November 12	Indiana	No. 5	Michigan Stadium; Ann Arbor, MI	W 20–7	79,200
November 19	No. 7 Ohio State	No. 5	Michigan Stadium; Ann Arbor, MI (rivalry)	T 7–7	97,239
*Non-conference game; ^{†}Homecoming; Rankings from AP Poll released prior to the game

== Rankings ==
Ranking movements Legend: ██ Increase in ranking ██ Decrease in ranking ( ) = First-place votes
	Week								
Poll	1	2	3	4	5	6	7	8	Final
AP	1 (34)	7	12	6	5	5	5	6	7

== Season summary ==
=== Pre-season ===
The 1948 Michigan team finished undefeated and untied with a 9–0 record and entered the 1949 season with a 23-game winning streak dating back to October 29, 1946. Several key players from the 1948 team were lost to graduation, including All-American end Dick Rifenberg, All-American quarterback Pete Elliott, center Dan Dworsky, guard Dominic Tomasi, and halfback Gene Derricotte. Finding a quarterback to replace Elliott and rebuilding the offensive line were rated as Michigan's biggest challenges in the 1949 pre-season.

Key players returning from the 1948 team were All-American tackle Alvin Wistert, halfback Chuck Ortmann, fullback Don Dufek, linebacker Dick Kempthorn, and tackle Robert Wahl.

=== Michigan State ===
Week 1: Michigan State at Michigan

Team	1	2	3	4	Total
Michigan State	3	0	0	0	3
• Michigan	0	7	0	0	7

- Date: September 24
- Location: Michigan Stadium
- Game attendance: 97,239

On September 24, Michigan opened its season with a 7–3 victory over Michigan State. The game was the first in the newly expanded Michigan Stadium and drew a record crowd of 97,239 persons. Michigan State recovered a Dick Kempthorn fumble early in the first quarter and took a 3–0 lead on a field goal by George Smith from the 18-yard line. Lloyd Heneveld recovered a fumble for Michigan at the end of the first quarter at the Michigan State 25-yard line. Four plays later, early in the second quarter, sophomore Bill Putich came off the bench for his collegiate debut on fourth down; he threw a 10-yard touchdown pass to Irv Wisniewski, and Harry Allis kicked the extra point.

The Wolverines held the Spartans to 92 rushing yards and 85 passing yards and intercepted as many passes (four) as the Spartans completed. On offense, the Wolverines turned the ball over four times (three times on fumbles, once on an interception) and tallied only 89 rushing yards and 115 passing yards. Michigan State halfback Lynn Chandnois gained acclaim for his efforts on both offense and defense, playing all 60 minutes of the game. Spartan guard Ed Bagdon, winner of the 1949 Outland Trophy, also played more than 55 minutes, as did Don Coleman.

=== At Stanford ===
Week 2: Michigan at Stanford

Team	1	2	3	4	Total
• Michigan	7	0	20	0	27
Stanford	0	0	0	7	7

- Date: October 1
- Location: Stanford Stadium
- Game attendance: 87,123

For its second game, Michigan traveled to Palo Alto, California, defeating Stanford by a 27–7 score before 87,123 spectators at Stanford Stadium. Stanford had outscored its first two opponents, San Jose and Harvard, by a combined 93 to 0. The victory extended Michigan's winning streak to 25 games, dating back to the 1946 season. On offense, Michigan totaled 286 rushing yards and 98 passing yards. Chuck Ortmann completed 5 of 16 passes for 81 yards and also rushed for 63 yards. Leo Koceski rushed for 90 yards and 12 carries and scored two touchdowns. Don Dufek, and Dick Kempthorn also scored touchdowns, and Harry Allis kicked three extra points. On defense, Michigan held Stanford to 116 rushing yards and 110 passing yards and forced six turnovers (three on interceptions and three on fumbles).

After its victory over Stanford, Michigan was ranked No. 1 in the weekly AP Poll.

=== Army ===
Week 3: Army at Michigan

Team	1	2	3	4	Total
• Army	7	7	0	7	21
Michigan	0	0	0	7	7

- Date: October 8
- Location: Michigan Stadium
- Game attendance: 97,239

On October 8, No. 1 Michigan's 25-game winning streak ended with a 21–7 loss to Army (ranked No. 7 in the weekly AP Poll) before a capacity crowd of 97,239 at Michigan Stadium. Army extended its own win streak to 14 games. On Michigan's second play from scrimmage, Chuck Ortmann, who had set the conference passing record in 1948, was kicked in the head, suffered a concussion, and was carried off the field on a stretcher. Without Ortmann to lead the passing game, Michigan completed only three of 23 passes for 16 yards and gave up four interceptions. With Michigan's passing game rendered ineffective, Army played six men on the line in an effort to neutralize Michigan's running game. Don Dufek scored Michigan's lone touchdown in the fourth quarter, and Harry Allis kicked the extra point. Later in the fourth quarter, with Army ahead 14–7, Michigan drove to Army's 16-yard line, but Michigan's Charley Lentz threw an interception into the end zone to end the threat.

=== At Northwestern ===
Week 4: Michigan at Northwestern

Team	1	2	3	4	Total
Michigan	0	7	6	7	20
• Northwestern	0	7	7	7	21

- Date: October 15
- Location: Dyche Stadium
- Game attendance: 54,816

On October 15, Michigan lost its second consecutive game, falling by a 21–20 score to Northwestern before a crowd of 54,816 at Dyche Stadium in Evanston, Illinois. Michigan entered the game as a 13-point favorite. Both teams scored three touchdowns, and the difference was a missed extra point. Harry Allis converted on the first and third extra points, but his kick after Michigan's second touchdown went wide to the right. The win ended Michigan's 15-game winning streak against Big Ten Conference opponents, dating back to 1946. It was also the first time since 1939 that Michigan had lost back-to-back contests; the first victory for Northwestern over Michigan since 1937; and Michigan's first one-point loss since 1940. Michigan dominated the game statistically with 17 first downs to eight for Northwestern, and 215 rushing yards to 159 for Northwestern.

=== Minnesota ===
Week 5: Minnesota at Michigan

Team	1	2	3	4	Total
Minnesota	0	0	7	0	7
• Michigan	7	7	0	0	14

- Date: October 22
- Location: Michigan Stadium
- Game attendance: 97,239

On October 22, Michigan (ranked No. 12 in the weekly AP Poll) upset undefeated Minnesota (ranked No. 3) by a 14–7 score before a capacity crowd of 97,239 at Michigan Stadium. Michigan was a two-touchdown underdog before the game. The Detroit Free Press credited "a heroic one-man show" from Chuck Ortmann for the victory. Ortmann accounted for 207 of Michigan's 228 yards. Ortmann ran for Michigan's first touchdown in the first quarter, and Wally Teninga followed with a rushing touchdown as time ran out in the second quarter to give Michigan a 14–0 lead at halftime. Harry Allis kicked both extra points. Michigan's scoring was limited by six turnovers, four on fumbles and two on interceptions. On defense, Michigan held Minnesota to 67 rushing yards (only four yards in the first half) and 77 passing yards. Chuck Lentz intercepted three Minnesota passes in the game. Minnesota's lone touchdown was scored off a blocked punt in the third quarter.

=== At Illinois ===
Week 6: Michigan at Illinois

Team	1	2	3	4	Total
• Michigan	0	7	6	0	13
Illinois	0	0	0	0	0

- Date: October 29
- Location: Memorial Stadium, Champaign, Illinois
- Game attendance: 71,119

On October 29, Michigan (ranked No. 6 in the weekly AP Poll) shut out Illinois, 13–0, before a crowd of 71,119 in Champaign. Illinois legends Red Grange and Robert Zuppke were on hand as the Illini celebrated Robert Zuppke Day and the 25th anniversary of the dedication of Memorial Stadium. Michigan gained 118 rushing yards and 145 passing yards and scored in the second quarter on a 51-yard touchdown pass from Chuck Ortmann to Harry Allis and in the third quarter on a short run by Don Peterson. Allis was successful on one of his two extra point kicks. Wally Teninga received praise for his performance, including a 61-yard punt from his own end zone and forcing an Illinois fumble at the Michigan two-yard line and then recovering the fumble. Johnny Karras gained 122 yards on 23 carries for Illinois, but Michigan's defense held the Illini scoreless.

=== Purdue ===
Week 7: Purdue at Michigan

Team	1	2	3	4	Total
Purdue	0	6	0	6	12
• Michigan	7	13	0	0	20

- Date: November 5
- Location: Michigan Stadium
- Game attendance: 95,207

On November 5, Michigan (ranked No. 5 in the weekly AP Poll) defeated Purdue by a 20–12 score before a crowd of 95,207 at Michigan Stadium. Michigan took a 7–0 lead on a short run by Don Dufek late in the first quarter. The teams then scored three touchdowns in a span of 90 seconds at the end of the second quarter. Purdue scored a touchdown but missed the extra point kick. Chuck Ortmann returned the ensuing kickoff 83 yards to the Purdue nine-yard line, and Michigan scored on nine-yard run off a reverse by Don Peterson. A short time later, Michigan's Chuck Lentz intercepted a Ken Gorgal pass near midfield and returned it to the Purdue 12-yard line. Bill Putich then threw a 12-yard touchdown pass to Harry Allis. Allis was successful on two of three extra point kicks, and Michigan led 20–6 at halftime.

=== Indiana ===
Week 8: Indiana at Michigan

Team	1	2	3	4	Total
Indiana	0	7	0	0	7
• Michigan	0	7	13	0	20

- Date: November 12
- Location: Michigan Stadium
- Game attendance: 79,200

On November 12, Michigan (ranked No. 5 in the weekly AP Poll) defeated Indiana by a 20–7 score before a crowd of 79,200 at Michigan Stadium. The game was tied at 7–7 at halftime as the teams traded touchdowns in the second quarter – a one-yard scoring run by Michigan's Wally Teninga followed by a seven-yard touchdown by Indiana quarterback Nick Sebek. Michigan then took the lead with two touchdowns in the third quarter – a six-yard touchdown run on a reverse by Robert Van Summern and a 12-yard touchdown pass from Chuck Ortmann to Don Peterson. Ortmann completed 10 of 19 passes for 160 yards, and Don Dufek rushed for 83 yards on 22 carries. Harry Allis was successful on two of three extra point kicks.

=== Ohio State ===
Week 9: Ohio State at Michigan

Team	1	2	3	4	Total
Ohio State	0	0	0	7	7
Michigan	7	0	0	0	7

- Date: November 19
- Location: Michigan Stadium
- Game attendance: 97,239

On November 19, Michigan (ranked No. 5) and Ohio State (ranked No. 7) played to a 7–7 tie before a capacity crowd of 97,239 at Michigan Stadium. With the tie, Michigan and Ohio State shared the 1949 Big Nine Conference championship. Michigan took a 7–0 lead in the first quarter on a 10-yard pass from Wally Teninga to Leo Koceski, and Harry Allis kicked the extra point. Ohio State scored its touchdown in the fourth quarter on a one-yard run by fullback Fred "Curly" Morrison. Jimmy Hague's extra point attempt went wide, but the officials ruled that Michigan end Ozzie Clark was offside. Hague split the uprights with his second attempt, and the game ended in a tie.

=== Post-season honors and developments ===
At the end of November the Associated Press (AP) released its final poll with unbeaten Notre Dame rated as the national champion. Michigan was rated at No. 7. The AP also analyzed the top programs' strength of schedule. With three opponents ranked among the top 10 in its final polling (Ohio State, Minnesota, and Army), the AP rated Michigan as having played the toughest schedule in 1949.

On November 24, the Michigan players selected fullback/linebacker Dick Kempthorn as the team's most valuable player. The United Press described him as "one of the top linebackers in Michigan history", citing his "keen analysis" and "vicious tackling". Don Dufek received the Meyer Morton Award.

Four Michigan players received first- or second-team All-America honors as follows:

- Tackle Alvin Wistert was a consensus All-American, receiving first-team honors from the All-America Board (AAB), the International News Service (INS), The Sporting News (TSN), and the United Press (UP).
- Tackle Robert Wahl received first-team All-America honors from the Football Writers Association of America (FWAA) and the Newspaper Enterprise Association (NEA).
- Halfback Chuck Ortmann received second-team honors from the Associated Press (AP) and UP and third-team honors from the FWAA.
- Kempthorn received second-team honors from the FWAA.

Several Michigan players also received all-conference honors as follows:

- On November 22, the Associated Press announced its all-conference team. Wistert, Ortmann, and guard Lloyd Heneveld received first-team honors. Wahl received second-team honors. Four Wolverines received honorable mention: end Harry Allis, tackle Thomas Johnson, guard Donald McClelland, and back Don Dufek.
- On November 30, the United Press announced its all-conference team. Three Michigan players received first-team honors: Heneveld, Wistert, and Ortmann. Wahl received second-team honors.

== Players ==
=== Letter winners ===
The following players won varsity letters for their participation on the 1949 Michigan football team. Players who started at least four games are shown in bold.

- **Harry Allis**, Flint, Michigan – started 9 games at left end; also placekicker and punter
- James L. Atchison, Cleveland – started 3 games at right tackle
- William H. Bartlett, Muskegon, Michigan – quarterback
- Oswald V. Clark, Montclair, New Jersey – started 2 games at right end
- Don Dufek, Evanston, Illinois – started 2 games at fullback, 1 game at right halfback
- **Robert F. Erben**, Akron, Ohio – started 6 games at center
- Richard D. Farrer, Trenton, Michigan – center
- Alan Fitch, Kensington, Maryland – guard
- **John Ghindia**, Ecorse, Michigan – started 7 games at quarterback
- **Lloyd A. Heneveld**, Holland, Michigan – started 3 games at left guard, 1 game at right guard
- John H. Hess, Grand Rapids, Michigan – tackle
- Gene Hinton, Drumright, Oklahoma – tackle
- Robert C. Holloway, Ann Arbor, Michigan – end
- Allen M. Jackson, Dearborn, Michigan – started 4 games at left guard; later, wrote an article for the Atlantic Monthly, "Too Much Football", decrying overemphasis of football in universities.
- Thomas Johnson, Muskegon Heights, Michigan – started 3 games at left tackle
- Ray Thomas Kelsey, Lakewood, Ohio – end
- **Dick Kempthorn**, Canton, Ohio – started 7 games at fullback
- **Leo Koceski**, Canonsburg, Pennsylvania – started 5 games at right halfback
- Carl A. Kreager, Detroit – center
- Charles W. Lentz, Toledo, Ohio – halfback
- **Donald B. McClelland**, Calumet, Michigan – started 8 games at right guard, 1 game at left guard
- Richard McWilliams, Cleveland, Ohio – tackle
- Tony Momsen – started 3 games at center
- William Ohlenroth, Chicago – tackle
- **Chuck Ortmann**, Milwaukee – started 7 games at left halfback
- Don Peterson, Racine, Wisconsin – halfback
- Thomas R. Peterson, Racine, Wisconsin – fullback
- Leslie Popp, Fort Wayne, Indiana – end
- John E. Powers, Tulsa, Oklahoma – guard
- Bill Putich, Cleveland – quarterback
- Ralph A. Straffon, Croswell, Michigan – fullback
- George Sutherland, Montclair, New Jersey – end
- Wally Teninga, Chicago – started 3 games at right halfback
- Robert Van Summern, Kenmore, New York – halfback
- **Robert Wahl**, Oak Park, Illinois – started 4 games at right tackle
- **Irv Wisniewski**, Lambertville, Michigan – started 7 games at right end, 2 games at right tackle
- **Alvin Wistert**, Chicago – started 6 games at left tackle
- James R. Wolter, Ypsilanti, Michigan – guard

=== Awards and honors ===
- Captain: Alvin Wistert

=== Statistical leaders ===
==== Rushing ====
Player	Attempts	Net yards	Yards per attempt	Touchdowns
Don Dufek	122	392	3.2	2
Chuck Ortmann	105	329	3.1	0
Leo Koceski	55	247	4.5	2

==== Passing ====
Player	Attempts	Completions	Interceptions	Comp %	Yards	Yds/Comp	TD	Long
Chuck Ortmann	126	45	3	35.7	627	13.9	2	51
Wally Teninga	32	8	4	25.0	62	7.8	1	16
Bill Putich	8	5	0	62.5	45	9.0	2	12

==== Receiving ====
Player	Receptions	Yards	Yds/Recp	TD	Long
Harry Allis	23	338	14.7	2	51
Irv Wisniewski	11	126	11.4	1	14
John Ghindia	8	77	9.6	0	16

==== Kickoff returns ====
Player	Returns	Yards	Yds/Return	TD	Long
Leo Koceski	8	158	19.8	0	24
Chuck Ortmann	4	149	37.3	0	82

==== Punt returns ====
Player	Returns	Yards	Yds/Return	TD	Long
Charlie Lentz	17	169	9.9	0	17
Wally Teninga	16	160	10.0	0	13

== Coaching staff ==
- Head coach: Bennie Oosterbaan
- Assistant coaches: Jack Blott, George Ceithaml, Cliff Keen, Ernest McCoy, Bill Orwig, Don Robinson, Walter Weber, J. T. White
- Trainer: Jim Hunt
- Manager: Howard Cooper
