= 1949 Illinois Fighting Illini football team =

American college football season

1949 Illinois Fighting Illini football
- Conference: Big Nine Conference
- Record: 3–4–2 (3–3–1 Big Nine)
- Head coach: Ray Eliot (8th season)
- MVP: Johnny Karras
- Captain: Lyle Button
- Home stadium: Memorial Stadium

1949 Big Nine Conference football standings
	Conf.					Overall
Team	W		L		T	W		L		T
No. 6 Ohio State +	4	–	1	–	1	7	–	1	–	2
No. 7 Michigan +	4	–	1	–	1	6	–	2	–	1
No. 8 Minnesota	4	–	2	–	0	7	–	2	–	0
Wisconsin	3	–	2	–	1	5	–	3	–	1
Illinois	3	–	3	–	1	3	–	4	–	2
Iowa	3	–	3	–	0	4	–	5	–	0
Northwestern	3	–	4	–	0	4	–	5	–	0
Purdue	2	–	4	–	0	4	–	5	–	0
Indiana	0	–	6	–	0	1	–	8	–	0
+ – Conference co-champions; Rankings from AP Poll

The 1949 Illinois Fighting Illini football team was an American football team that represented the University of Illinois as a member of the Big Nine Conference during the 1949 Big Nine season. In their eighth year under head coach Ray Eliot, the Fighting Illini compiled a 3–4–2 record (3–3–1 in conference games), finished in fifth place in the Big Nine, and outscored opponents by a total of 149 to 140.

Halfback Johnny Karras was selected as the team's most valuable player. Karras and guard Charles Gottfried received first-team honors on the 1949 All-Big Nine Conference football team.

The team played its home games at Memorial Stadium in Champaign, Illinois.

== Schedule ==
Date	Opponent	Site	Result	Attendance	Source
September 24	Iowa State*	Memorial Stadium; Champaign, IL	T 20–20	31,106–31,883	
October 1	Wisconsin	Memorial Stadium; Champaign, IL	T 13–13	38,332	
October 8	at Iowa	Iowa Stadium; Iowa City, IA	W 20–14	45,066	
October 15	Missouri*	Memorial Stadium; Champaign, IL (rivalry)	L 20–27	42,184	
October 22	at Purdue	Ross–Ade Stadium; West Lafayette, IN (rivalry)	W 19–0	48,000	
October 29	No. 6 Michigan	Memorial Stadium; Champaign, IL (rivalry)	L 0–13	71,119	
November 5	Indiana	Memorial Stadium; Champaign, IL (rivalry)	W 33–14	40,457	
November 12	at No. 11 Ohio State	Ohio Stadium; Columbus, OH (Illibuck)	L 17–30	81,805	
November 19	Northwestern	Memorial Stadium; Champaign, IL (rivalry)	L 7–9	67,872	
*Non-conference game; Rankings from AP Poll released prior to the game
