= 1949 Ohio State Buckeyes football team =

American college football season

1949 Ohio State Buckeyes football
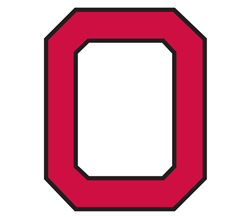

Big Nine co-champion Rose Bowl champion

Rose Bowl, W 17–14 vs. California
- Conference: Big Nine Conference

Ranking
- AP: No. 6
- Record: 7–1–2 (4–1–1 Big Nine)
- Head coach: Wes Fesler (3rd season)
- MVP: Jack Lininger
- Captain: A. Jack Wilson
- Home stadium: Ohio Stadium

1949 Big Nine Conference football standings
	Conf.					Overall
Team	W		L		T	W		L		T
No. 6 Ohio State +	4	–	1	–	1	7	–	1	–	2
No. 7 Michigan +	4	–	1	–	1	6	–	2	–	1
No. 8 Minnesota	4	–	2	–	0	7	–	2	–	0
Wisconsin	3	–	2	–	1	5	–	3	–	1
Illinois	3	–	3	–	1	3	–	4	–	2
Iowa	3	–	3	–	0	4	–	5	–	0
Northwestern	3	–	4	–	0	4	–	5	–	0
Purdue	2	–	4	–	0	4	–	5	–	0
Indiana	0	–	6	–	0	1	–	8	–	0
+ – Conference co-champions; Rankings from AP Poll

The 1949 Ohio State Buckeyes football team represented Ohio State University in the 1949 Big Nine Conference football season. The Buckeyes compiled a 7–1–2 record to win a share of the Big Ten Conference title and win their first Rose Bowl against California.

== Schedule ==
Date	Opponent	Rank	Site	Result	Attendance	Source
September 24	Missouri*		Ohio Stadium; Columbus, OH	W 35–34	66,510	
October 1	Indiana		Ohio Stadium; Columbus, OH	W 46–7	70,568	
October 8	at No. 8 USC*	No. 11	Los Angeles Memorial Coliseum; Los Angeles, CA	T 13–13	62,877	
October 15	No. 5 Minnesota	No. 11	Ohio Stadium; Columbus, OH	L 0–27	82,111	
October 22	at Wisconsin		Camp Randall Stadium; Madison, WI	W 21–0	45,000	
October 29	Northwestern	No. 18	Ohio Stadium; Columbus, OH	W 24–7	81,872	
November 5	at Pittsburgh*	No. 11	Pitt Stadium; Pittsburgh, PA	W 14–10	54,789	
November 12	Illinois	No. 11	Ohio Stadium; Columbus, OH (Illibuck)	W 30–17	81,805	
November 19	at No. 5 Michigan	No. 7	Michigan Stadium; Ann Arbor, MI (rivalry)	T 7–7	97,239	
January 2, 1950	vs. No. 2 California*	No. 5	Rose Bowl; Pasadena, CA (Rose Bowl)	W 17–14	100,963	
*Non-conference game; Rankings from AP Poll released prior to the game

== Rankings ==
Ranking movements Legend: ██ Increase in ranking ██ Decrease in ranking — = Not ranked
	Week								
Poll	1	2	3	4	5	6	7	8	Final
AP	11	11	—	18	11	11	7	5	6

== Game summaries ==
=== USC ===
- Fred "Curly" Morrison 134 rushing yards, Gerald Krall 103 rushing yards

== Coaching staff ==
- Wes Fesler, head coach, third year
- Lyal Clark, assistant
- Gene Fekete, assistant
- Richard Fisher, assistant
- Esco Sarkkinen, assistant
- Harry Strobel, assistant

== Statistics ==
- Rushing: Gerald Krall 128 attempts, 606 yards, 4 TD
- Passing: Pandel Savic 35/84, 581 yards, 6 TD, 4 INT
- Receiving: Ray Hamilton 15 receptions, 347 yards
- Points: Fred Morrison 54 points (9 TD)

== Awards and honors ==
- All-Big Ten: C Jack Lininger, HB Gerry Krall

== 1950 NFL draftees ==
Player	Round	Pick	Position	NFL club
Fred "Curly" Morrison	1	10	Fullback	Chicago Bears
Jack Jennings	2	21	Tackle	Chicago Cardinals
Dick O'Hanlon	8	105	Tackle	Philadelphia Eagles
Jack Wilson	11	135	Tackle	Detroit Lions
Bill Trautwein	14	181	Tackle	Los Angeles Rams
Jim Hague	22	287	End	Philadelphia Eagles
George Mattey	23	290	Guard	Green Bay Packers
