= 1949 Indiana Hoosiers football team =

American college football season

1949 Indiana Hoosiers football
- Conference: Big Nine Conference
- Record: 1–8 (0–6 Big Nine)
- Head coach: Clyde B. Smith (2nd season)
- MVP: Nick Sebek
- Captain: Walter Bartkiewicz
- Home stadium: Memorial Stadium

1949 Big Nine Conference football standings
	Conf.					Overall
Team	W		L		T	W		L		T
No. 6 Ohio State +	4	–	1	–	1	7	–	1	–	2
No. 7 Michigan +	4	–	1	–	1	6	–	2	–	1
No. 8 Minnesota	4	–	2	–	0	7	–	2	–	0
Wisconsin	3	–	2	–	1	5	–	3	–	1
Illinois	3	–	3	–	1	3	–	4	–	2
Iowa	3	–	3	–	0	4	–	5	–	0
Northwestern	3	–	4	–	0	4	–	5	–	0
Purdue	2	–	4	–	0	4	–	5	–	0
Indiana	0	–	6	–	0	1	–	8	–	0
+ – Conference co-champions; Rankings from AP Poll

The 1949 Indiana Hoosiers football team represented the Indiana Hoosiers in the 1949 Big Nine Conference football season. They participated as members of the Big Ten Conference. The Hoosiers played their home games at Memorial Stadium in Bloomington, Indiana. The team was coached by Clyde B. Smith, in his second year as head coach of the Hoosiers.

== Schedule ==
Date	Opponent	Site	Result	Attendance	Source
September 24	at Notre Dame*	Notre Dame Stadium; Notre Dame, IN	L 6–49	53,844	
October 1	at Ohio State	Ohio Stadium; Columbus, OH	L 7–46	70,568	
October 8	TCU*	Memorial Stadium; Bloomington, IN	L 6–13	20,000	
October 15	at Iowa	Iowa Stadium; Iowa City, IA	L 9–35		
October 22	No. 16 Pittsburgh*	Memorial Stadium; Bloomington, IN	W 48–14	16,000	
October 29	Wisconsin	Memorial Stadium; Bloomington, IN	L 14–30	30,000	
November 5	at Illinois	Memorial Stadium; Champaign, IL (rivalry)	L 14–33	40,457	
November 12	at No. 5 Michigan	Michigan Stadium; Ann Arbor, MI	L 7–20	79,200	
November 19	Purdue	Memorial Stadium; Bloomington, IN (Old Oaken Bucket)	L 6–14	34,000	
*Non-conference game; Rankings from AP Poll released prior to the game

== After the season ==
=== NFL draft ===
One Hoosier was selected in the 1950 NFL draft, held in January.

Round	Pick	Player	Position	NFL team
21	266	Cas "Slug" Witucki	Guard	Washington Redskins
