= Wistert =

Wistert may refer to any of the three Wistert brothers who played college football at the University of Michigan:

- Al Wistert (1920–2016), 1942 All-American, 1968 College Football Hall of Fame inductee, Philadelphia Eagle player
- Alvin Wistert (1916–2005), 1948 and 1949 All-American, 1981 College Football Hall of Fame inductee
- Whitey Wistert (1912–1985), 1933 All-American, 1967 College Football Hall of Fame inductee, 1934 Big Ten Baseball MVP, Cincinnati Reds player
