= 1949 Purdue Boilermakers football team =

American college football season

1949 Purdue Boilermakers football
- Conference: Big Nine Conference
- Record: 4–5 (2–4 Big Nine)
- Head coach: Stu Holcomb (3rd season)
- MVP: Lou Karras
- Captain: Angelo Carnaghi
- Home stadium: Ross–Ade Stadium

1949 Big Nine Conference football standings
	Conf.					Overall
Team	W		L		T	W		L		T
No. 6 Ohio State +	4	–	1	–	1	7	–	1	–	2
No. 7 Michigan +	4	–	1	–	1	6	–	2	–	1
No. 8 Minnesota	4	–	2	–	0	7	–	2	–	0
Wisconsin	3	–	2	–	1	5	–	3	–	1
Illinois	3	–	3	–	1	3	–	4	–	2
Iowa	3	–	3	–	0	4	–	5	–	0
Northwestern	3	–	4	–	0	4	–	5	–	0
Purdue	2	–	4	–	0	4	–	5	–	0
Indiana	0	–	6	–	0	1	–	8	–	0
+ – Conference co-champions; Rankings from AP Poll

The 1949 Purdue Boilermakers football team was an American football team that represented Purdue University during the 1949 Big Nine Conference football season. In their third season under head coach Stu Holcomb, the Boilermakers compiled a 4–5 record, finished in eighth place in the Big Ten Conference with a 2–4 record against conference opponents, and were outscored by their opponents by a total of 175 to 126.

Notable players from the 1949 Purdue team included tackle Lou Karras and fullback John Kerestes.

== Schedule ==
Date	Opponent	Site	Result	Attendance	Source
September 24	at Northwestern	Dyche Stadium; Evanston, IL	L 6–20	35,000	
October 1	Iowa	Ross–Ade Stadium; West Lafayette, IN	L 7–21	32,000	
October 8	No. 2 Notre Dame*	Ross–Ade Stadium; West Lafayette, IN (rivalry)	L 12–35	52,000	
October 14	at Miami (FL)*	Burdine Stadium; Miami, FL	W 14–0	47,835	
October 22	Illinois^{†}	Ross–Ade Stadium; West Lafayette, IN (rivalry)	L 0–19	48,000	
October 29	at No. 7 Minnesota	Memorial Stadium; Minneapolis, MN	W 13–7	61,154	
November 5	at No. 5 Michigan	Michigan Stadium; Ann Arbor, MI	L 12–20	95,207	
November 12	Marquette*	Ross–Ade Stadium; West Lafayette, IN	W 41–7	28,000	
November 19	at Indiana	Memorial Stadium; Bloomington, IN (Old Oaken Bucket)	W 14–6	34,000	
*Non-conference game; ^{†}Homecoming; Rankings from AP Poll released prior to the game

== Game summaries ==
=== Iowa ===
- John Kerestes 24 rushes, 150 yards

=== Marquette ===
- Harry Szulborski 15 rushes, 162 yards
- Norbert Adams 8 rushes, 113 yards

=== Indiana ===
- Harry Szulborski 20 rushes, 110 yards

== Roster ==
- Norbert Adams, HB
- John Beletic, T
- Ronald Bland, E
- Pete Brewster, E
- Andy Butchko, E
- Angelo Carnaghi, HB-C
- Clement Crowe, C
- Bill Deem, G
- Ken Gorgal, QB
- Bob Hartman, QB
- Don Jackson, G
- Jim Janosek, T
- Mike Kalapos, T
- Lou Karras, T
- Don Kasperan, FB
- John Kerestes, FB
- Clinton Knitz, C
- Mike Maccioli, HB
- Kenneth McCaffry, E
- Steve Manich, HB
- Bill Murray, G
- Lyle Myrice, C
- Bill Reed, C
- Elmer Scallish, G
- Neil Schmidt, HB
- Dick Schnaible, QB
- Joe Skibinski, G
- Bill Skowron, HB-K
- Kenneth Smith, G
- Leo Sugar, E
- Harry Szulborski, HB
- Jim Tate, T
- Rudy Trbovich, T
- Jim Weizer, G
- Bob Whitmer, E
