= John Ghindia =

American football player (1925–2012)

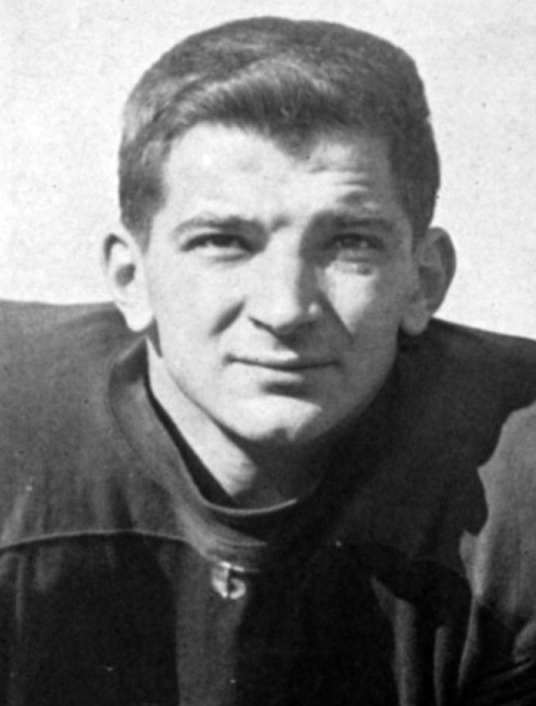
- Ghindia in 1949

No. 23
- Positions: Quarterback, Linebacker

Personal information
- Born: October 12, 1925; Niles, Ohio, U.S.
- Died: March 16, 2012 (aged 86); Trenton, Michigan, U.S.
- Listed height: 5 ft 10 in (1.78 m)
- Listed weight: 180 lb (82 kg)

Career information
- High school: Ecorse High School, Ecorse, Michigan
- College: University of Michigan

Career history
- 1946–1949: Michigan

Awards and highlights
- National champion (1948); Starting QB, 1949 Michigan Big Ten Co-Champions; Inductee, Michigan HS Coaches Hall of Fame; Inductee, Michigan Tennis Hall of Fame; Inductee, Michigan Catholic Hall of Fame

John Verle Ghindia (October 12, 1925 – March 16, 2012) was an American football player, high school coach, educator, and municipal recreation director.

Ghindia went straight from the Army Air Corp to playing college football at the University of Michigan from 1946 to 1949 under legendary head coaches Fritz Crisler and Bennie Oosterbaan. He was the starting quarterback for the 1949 Michigan Wolverines football team that compiled a 6-2-1 record, tied for the Big Ten Conference championship, and finished the season ranked No. 7 in the final AP Poll. He also appeared in one game at the fullback position in 1948 campaign, before a knee injury ended his season. Ghindia was a member of the undefeated 1947 and 1948 teams, both crowned national champions. The 1947 team is considered one of college football's all-time greats after beating USC 49–0 in the 1948 Rose Bowl. In 1946–1949, Michigan won the Big Ten Football Championship three (3) times.

After earning his bachelors and masters degrees in mathematics, Ghindia served as a high school math teacher and coach at Wyandotte Saint Patrick's, Lincoln Park High School, and Ecorse High School in Michigan. At St Pat's, John coached football, basketball and baseball for 7 years, winning numerous Catholic League titles, and never losing to arch-rival Wyandotte Our Lady of Mt Carmel. At Ecorse High, in 1967, he coached the varsity hockey team (as a last-minute emergency replacement) to a State Runner-up in his only year. Ghindia was the tennis coach from 1964 to 1985, and led his teams to numerous conference and state regional championships, compiling a record of 251-82. He was inducted into the Michigan High School Coaches Hall of Fame, Michigan Catholic Coaches Hall of Fame, and the Michigan Tennis Hall of Fame. He also served as director of the Ecorse Recreation Department.

== Early life ==
Ghindia was born in Niles, Ohio, in 1925. His father, John N. Ghindia, was a Romanian immigrant who came to the United States in 1915 and worked in various steel mills as a millwright. As a youth, Ghindia moved with his family to Ecorse, Michigan. Ghindia attended Ecorse High School, and earned 12 Letters competing in football, basketball, baseball and rowing. At age 16, he was the player-coach on the Ecorse basketball team that won the League Title with a 15-3 record. There was no State Basketball Tournaments during World War II. In 1942 Ghindia led Ecorse High School to a League Championship in football, and his team was State Class B Basketball Runner-up. In 1943, the Ecorse High School Rowing Eight Oar Crew won both the National High School Championship and North America Open Championship, upsetting the NCAA Champions.

After graduating from high school in 1943, Ghindia enlisted in the United States Army Air Corps. He was in the military from 1943 to 1945, attained the rank of a second lieutenant, and served as a bombardier on a B-24 heavy bomber.

== University of Michigan ==
After being discharged from the military, Ghindia enrolled at the University of Michigan. He played college football at Michigan from 1946 to 1949 under head coaches Fritz Crisler and Bennie Oosterbaan. Ghindia was a member of the Phi Delta Theta fraternity at Michigan. He earned a Bachelor of Science degree from Michigan in 1950 and a Masters of Science degree in 1962.

=== 1946 to 1948 seasons ===
As a freshman in 1946, Ghindia was a reserve on Fritz Crisler's football team and captained Michigan's undefeated freshman team. As a sophomore, he was a reserve player on the undefeated 10-0 1947 Michigan Wolverines football team, which won the Big Ten Championship, and was dubbed the "Mad Magicians" after dismantling USC 48-0 in the 1948 Rose Bowl. Michigan won a share of the National Championship with Notre Dame .

As a junior in 1948, Ghindia started the first game of the season against Michigan State, playing at the fullback position. However, he missed the rest of the season after suffering a knee injury that required surgery in the off-season. The 1948 team compiled Michigan's second straight undefeated season and was recognized as the national champion in the final AP Poll.

=== 1949 season ===
In 1949, Bill Bartlett began the season as Michigan's starting quarterback. For the second game of the season, head coach Bennie Oosterbaan announced that Ghindia would be the starting quarterback. Ghindia led the Wolverines to a 27-8 win over Stanford. According to the Chicago Daily Tribune, Ghindia "called a masterful game" against Stanford. Another newspaper described Ghindia's performance as follows:

"Michigan's 'new' quarterback, the veteran John Ghindia of Ecorse, Mich., a lad who came up the hard way, from the reserves, and who started his first game at the signal calling position against Stanford, will handle the field general spot Saturday. The 179-pound blocking back, who handled the generalship assignment reminiscent of Howard Yerges and Pete Elliott, quarterbacks on the 1947 and 1948 championship teams respectively, pulled a shaky first half team together and knitted into a confident, coordinated outfit. Significant was the fact that his precision blocking paved the way for the Wolverine running attack."

The following week, Ghindia fumbled on Michigan's 13-yard line leading to an Army touchdown and a 14-0 deficit in the second quarter; Army defeated Michigan 21-7, ending Michigan's 25-game winning streak dating back to the 1946 season. After consecutive losses to Army and Northwestern, Ghindia led the Wolverines to a 14-7 win against No. 1 ranked Minnesota. After the Minnesota game, Arch Ward of the Chicago Daily Tribune wrote, "John Ghindia's performance today should dispel all doubt about the caliber of Michigan's field generalship. He called plays expertly."

Ghindia started seven of nine games for the 1949 Michigan team that finished with a record of 6-2-1, tied for the Big Ten Conference championship and was ranked No. 7 in the final AP poll. Ghindia's value was as a play-caller and blocking back rather than as a passer or rusher. Under Fritz Crisler and Bennie Oosterbaan, the QB called the plays and ran the offense. Run blocking was a key assignment on many plays. In 1949, Ghindia caught eight passes for 77 yards (#3 on team), but completed only one of seven passes for 11 yards and threw two interceptions; halfback Chuck Ortmann was the team's leading passer with 627 passing yards. Ghindia carried the ball only four times in 1949 for negative seven rushing yards. Quarterbacks in Crisler's single-wing offense, adopted by Oosterbaan, mainly called the plays and blocked.

== Coaching career ==
After graduating from Michigan, Ghindia worked as a math teacher. He taught math for 33 years at Lincoln Park High School, Ecorse High School, and Henry Ford Community College. In July 1953, he accepted the position of head coach of all sports at St. Patrick High School in Wyandotte, Michigan. He was the school's first full-time coach, coaching football, basketball and baseball. Ghindia coached all sports at St. Pat's 1951-1958 compiling a record of 192-92-1 (tie). St Pat's won the Detroit Catholic League Championship in 1952. Ghindia's 1956 baseball team was undefeated and beat Austin High School, led by Dave DeBusschere, at Tiger/Briggs Stadium to win the Detroit Catholic Championship.

Ghindia later served as a tennis and ice hockey (one year, State Runner-up) coach at Ecorse High School in his home town of Ecorse, Michigan. He coached the Ecorse High School tennis team from 1964 to 1986, leading the team to a number of league and regional championships and compiling a record of 251-82. Ghindia retired from teaching in 1986.

Ghindia also served as the Director of the Ecorse Recreation Department for 16 years starting in 1956. The Ecorse Parks & Recreation program offered hundreds of kids from 14 parks throughout the city the opportunity to go on field trips such as BoB-Lo Island Amusement Park, Detroit Tiger baseball games, Detroit Zoo, and other outings. In Ecorse, he co-hosted an annual Winter Carnival and July 4 Festival with no charges. He used his position as recreation director to particularly promote youth sports in the Ecorse community. He also helped pioneer the youth hockey programs for boys and girls in the Downriver area of metropolitan Detroit. Everything was provided free of costs. For adults, Ecorse provided a Touch Football League, Softball League, and Senior Citizen Program. Under Ghindia's watch, Ecorse built the first outdoor ice rink in the Downriver Detroit area in 1957. In 1968, he led the conversion of Ecorse's Ice Rink into an indoor facility. Lastly, Ecorse held one of the largest Hockey and Softball annual tournaments in the midwest.

Ghindia has been inducted into the Michigan Catholic High School Hall of Fame, Michigan High School Coaches Hall of Fame, Michigan Tennis Hall of Fame, and Michigan High School Officials Hall of Fame.

== Family and later years ==
Ghindia was married in 1956. He and his wife, Katherine Sue, lived for many years in Trenton, Michigan. They had three daughters, Mary Beth, Suzanne, and Janet, and two sons, John and George. Ghindia was a parishioner and usher at St. Joseph Catholic Church in Trenton for 40 years. He was also a member of the Kiwanis club for 50 years.

Ghindia's son, John R. Ghindia, was an offensive lineman at the University of Michigan under head coach Bo Schembechler from 1981 to 1984. His son, George W. Ghindia, played football as a tight end at Western Michigan University, and his daughter Suzanne competed in tennis at Western Michigan. George later recalled:

"He was a champion and Hall of Famer in all areas of his life, especially husband (56 years) and father. . . . My sisters, brother and I learned to play hockey (from him) on outdoor rinks, and we banged tennis balls against gymnasium walls and the plywood boards in our garage. Three of us earned athletic scholarships to college."

In March 2012, he died from congestive heart failure at age 86 in Trenton. His son John said at the time that Ghindia "kept teaching us and providing a great example right up to the end," and added, "Alleluia & Go Blue!" Rick Leach, who followed Ghindia as Michigan's quarterback in the 1970s, noted: "He set a very high standard for the rest of us who consider ourselves to be 'good' M Men. When someone asks you what's the definition of a 'Michigan Man,' think of John V. Ghindia." Buried at Woodmere Cemetery, Detroit, Michigan.
