= 1949 Minnesota Golden Gophers football team =

American college football season

1949 Minnesota Golden Gophers football
- Conference: Big Nine Conference

Ranking
- AP: No. 8
- Record: 7–2 (4–2 Big Nine)
- Head coach: Bernie Bierman (15th season)
- MVPs: Bud Grant; John Lundin
- Captains: Howard Brennan; Clayton Tonnemaker
- Home stadium: Memorial Stadium

1949 Big Nine Conference football standings
	Conf.					Overall
Team	W		L		T	W		L		T
No. 6 Ohio State +	4	–	1	–	1	7	–	1	–	2
No. 7 Michigan +	4	–	1	–	1	6	–	2	–	1
No. 8 Minnesota	4	–	2	–	0	7	–	2	–	0
Wisconsin	3	–	2	–	1	5	–	3	–	1
Illinois	3	–	3	–	1	3	–	4	–	2
Iowa	3	–	3	–	0	4	–	5	–	0
Northwestern	3	–	4	–	0	4	–	5	–	0
Purdue	2	–	4	–	0	4	–	5	–	0
Indiana	0	–	6	–	0	1	–	8	–	0
+ – Conference co-champions; Rankings from AP Poll

The 1949 Minnesota Golden Gophers football team represented the University of Minnesota in the 1949 Big Nine Conference football season. In their 15th year under head coach Bernie Bierman, the Golden Gophers compiled a 7–2 record and outscored their opponents by a combined total of 231 to 80.

Tackle Leo Nomellini was named an All-American by Walter Camp Football Foundation, Associated Press (AP), Look Magazine, and the American Football Coaches Association (AFCA). Center Clayton Tonnemaker was named an All-American by Walter Camp Football Foundation, AP, Collier's/Grantland Rice, Look Magazine, Football Writers Association of America and the AFCA. Nomellini, Tonnemaker and end Bud Grant were named All-Big Ten first team. Guard John Lundin was named All-Big Ten second team.

Bud Grant, end, and John Lundin, guard, were awarded the Team MVP Awards.

Total attendance for the season was 305,200, which averaged to 61,040. The season high for attendance was against Wisconsin.

== Schedule ==
Date	Opponent	Rank	Site	Result	Attendance	Source
September 24	Washington*		Memorial Stadium; Minneapolis, MN	W 48–20	55,256	
October 1	at Nebraska*		Memorial Stadium; Lincoln, NE (rivalry)	W 28–6	34,000	
October 8	No. 20 Northwestern	No. 5	Memorial Stadium; Minneapolis, MN	W 21–7	63,063	
October 15	at No. 11 Ohio State	No. 5	Ohio Stadium; Columbus, OH	W 27–0	82,111	
October 22	at No. 12 Michigan	No. 3	Michigan Stadium; Ann Arbor, MI (Little Brown Jug)	L 7–14	97,239	
October 29	Purdue^{†}	No. 7	Memorial Stadium; Minneapolis, MN	L 7–13	61,154	
November 5	No. 15 Iowa		Memorial Stadium; Minneapolis, MN (rivalry)	W 55–7	62,089	
November 12	at Pittsburgh	No. 9	Pitt Stadium; Pittsburgh, PA	W 24–7	42,515	
November 19	Wisconsin	No. 8	Memorial Stadium; Minneapolis, MN (rivalry)	W 14–6	63,139	
*Non-conference game; ^{†}Homecoming; Rankings from AP Poll released prior to the game

== Rankings ==
Ranking movements Legend: ██ Increase in ranking ██ Decrease in ranking — = Not ranked ( ) = First-place votes
	Week								
Poll	1	2	3	4	5	6	7	8	Final
AP	5 (2)	5 (6)	3 (8)	7	—	9	8	8	8

== Roster ==
Dick Anonsen, QB

Jim Malosky, QB

Billy Bye, LHB

Dick Gregory, LHB

George Hudak, LHB

Ralph McAlister, RHB

Dale Warner, RHB

Dick Moy, RHB

Frank Kuzma, FB

Ken Beiersdorf, FB

Bud Grant, E

Gordy Soltau, E

Clayton Tonnemaker, C

Jerry Ekberg, T

Leo Nomellini, T/G

Gene Fritz, G

Johnny Lundin, G

Cal Stoll, E

Russell James Reed, G

== After the season ==
The following Golden Gophers were selected in the 1950 NFL draft after the season.

Round	Pick	Player	Position	NFL team
1	4	Clayton Tonnemaker	Center	Green Bay Packers
1	11	Leo Nomellini	Defensive tackle	San Francisco 49ers
1	14	Bud Grant	End	Philadelphia Eagles
3	30	Gordy Soltau	End	Green Bay Packers
6	70	Floyd Jaszewski	Tackle	Detroit Lions
8	96	Ralph McAlister	Back	Detroit Lions
10	121	Bob Mealey	Tackle	Green Bay Packers
14	176	Gene Fritz	Tackle	New York Giants
16	199	Frank Kuzma	Back	Green Bay Packers
19	244	Billy Bye	Back	Chicago Bears
25	319	Ken Beiersdorf	Back	New York Giants
29	370	Johnny Lundin	Guard	Washington Redskins
30	388	Allen Markert	Tackle	Chicago Bears
