= 1949 Northwestern Wildcats football team =

American college football season

1949 Northwestern Wildcats football
- Conference: Big Nine Conference
- Record: 4–5 (3–4 Big Nine)
- Head coach: Bob Voigts (3rd season)
- MVPs: Don Burson; Gaspar Perricone
- Captain: Steve Sawle
- Home stadium: Dyche Stadium

1949 Big Nine Conference football standings
	Conf.					Overall
Team	W		L		T	W		L		T
No. 6 Ohio State +	4	–	1	–	1	7	–	1	–	2
No. 7 Michigan +	4	–	1	–	1	6	–	2	–	1
No. 8 Minnesota	4	–	2	–	0	7	–	2	–	0
Wisconsin	3	–	2	–	1	5	–	3	–	1
Illinois	3	–	3	–	1	3	–	4	–	2
Iowa	3	–	3	–	0	4	–	5	–	0
Northwestern	3	–	4	–	0	4	–	5	–	0
Purdue	2	–	4	–	0	4	–	5	–	0
Indiana	0	–	6	–	0	1	–	8	–	0
+ – Conference co-champions; Rankings from AP Poll

The 1949 Northwestern Wildcats team represented Northwestern University during the 1949 Big Nine Conference football season. In their third year under head coach Bob Voigts, the Wildcats compiled a 4–5 record (3–4 against Big Ten Conference opponents) and finished in seventh place in the Big Ten Conference. Quarterback Don Burson was selected as a first-team All-Big Ten player by both the Associated Press and the United Press.

== Schedule ==
Date	Opponent	Rank	Site	Result	Attendance	Source
September 24	Purdue		Dyche Stadium; Evanston, IL	W 20–6	35,000	
October 1	Pittsburgh*		Dyche Stadium; Evanston, IL	L 7–16	41,000	
October 8	at No. 5 Minnesota	No. 20	Memorial Stadium; Minneapolis, MN	L 7–21	63,063	
October 15	No. 7 Michigan		Dyche Stadium; Evanston, IL (rivalry)	W 21–20	54,816	
October 22	at Iowa	No. 13	Iowa Stadium; Iowa City, IA	L 21–28		
October 29	at No. 18 Ohio State		Ohio Stadium; Columbus, OH	L 7–24	81,872	
November 5	Wisconsin		Dyche Stadium; Evanston, IL	L 6–14	51,000	
November 12	Colgate*		Dyche Stadium; Evanston, IL	W 39–20	40,000	
November 19	at Illinois		Memorial Stadium; Champaign, Illinois, IL (rivalry)	W 9–7	67,872	
*Non-conference game; Rankings from AP Poll released prior to the game

== Rankings ==
Ranking movements Legend: ██ Increase in ranking ██ Decrease in ranking — = Not ranked т = Tied with team above or below
	Week								
Poll	1	2	3	4	5	6	7	8	Final
AP	20т	—	13	—	—	—	—	—	—
