= 1949 Iowa Hawkeyes football team =

American college football season

1949 Iowa Hawkeyes football
- Conference: Big Nine Conference
- Record: 4–5 (3–3 Big Nine)
- Head coach: Eddie Anderson (8th season)
- MVP: Jack Dittmer
- Home stadium: Iowa Stadium

1949 Big Nine Conference football standings
	Conf.					Overall
Team	W		L		T	W		L		T
No. 6 Ohio State +	4	–	1	–	1	7	–	1	–	2
No. 7 Michigan +	4	–	1	–	1	6	–	2	–	1
No. 8 Minnesota	4	–	2	–	0	7	–	2	–	0
Wisconsin	3	–	2	–	1	5	–	3	–	1
Illinois	3	–	3	–	1	3	–	4	–	2
Iowa	3	–	3	–	0	4	–	5	–	0
Northwestern	3	–	4	–	0	4	–	5	–	0
Purdue	2	–	4	–	0	4	–	5	–	0
Indiana	0	–	6	–	0	1	–	8	–	0
+ – Conference co-champions; Rankings from AP Poll

The 1949 Iowa Hawkeyes football team was an American football team that represented the University of Iowa as a member of the Big Nine Conference during the 1949 Big Nine football season. In their eighth and final season under head coach Eddie Anderson, the Hawkeyes compiled a 4–5 record (3–3 in conference games), finished in sixth place in the Big Nine, and were outscored by a total of 247 to 184.

The team played its home games at Iowa Stadium in Iowa City, Iowa.

== Schedule ==
Date	Opponent	Rank	Site	Result	Attendance
September 24	UCLA*		Iowa Stadium; Iowa City, IA	L 25–41	43,546
October 1	at Purdue		Ross–Ade Stadium; West Lafayette, IN	W 21–7	32,000
October 8	Illinois		Iowa Stadium; Iowa City, IA	L 14–20	45,066
October 15	Indiana^{†}		Iowa Stadium; Iowa City, IA	W 35–9	
October 22	No. 13 Northwestern		Iowa Stadium; Iowa City, IA	W 28–21	
October 29	Oregon*		Iowa Stadium; Iowa City, IA	W 34–31	
November 5	at Minnesota	No. 15	Memorial Stadium; Minneapolis, MN (rivalry)	L 7–55	62,089
November 12	at Wisconsin		Camp Randall Stadium; Madison, WI (rivalry)	L 13–35	45,000
November 19	at No. 1 Notre Dame*		Notre Dame Stadium; Notre Dame, IN	L 7–28	56,790
*Non-conference game; ^{†}Homecoming; Rankings from AP Poll released prior to the game

== Rankings ==
Ranking movements Legend: ██ Increase in ranking ██ Decrease in ranking — = Not ranked
	Week								
Poll	1	2	3	4	5	6	7	8	Final
AP	—	—	—	—	15	—	—	—	—
