= 1949 Wisconsin Badgers football team =

American college football season

1949 Wisconsin Badgers football
- Conference: Big Nine Conference
- Record: 5–3–1 (3–2–1 Big Nine)
- Head coach: Ivy Williamson (1st season)
- MVP: Red Wilson
- Captain: Red Wilson
- Home stadium: Camp Randall Stadium

1949 Big Nine Conference football standings
	Conf.					Overall
Team	W		L		T	W		L		T
No. 6 Ohio State +	4	–	1	–	1	7	–	1	–	2
No. 7 Michigan +	4	–	1	–	1	6	–	2	–	1
No. 8 Minnesota	4	–	2	–	0	7	–	2	–	0
Wisconsin	3	–	2	–	1	5	–	3	–	1
Illinois	3	–	3	–	1	3	–	4	–	2
Iowa	3	–	3	–	0	4	–	5	–	0
Northwestern	3	–	4	–	0	4	–	5	–	0
Purdue	2	–	4	–	0	4	–	5	–	0
Indiana	0	–	6	–	0	1	–	8	–	0
+ – Conference co-champions; Rankings from AP Poll

The 1949 Wisconsin Badgers football team represented the University of Wisconsin in the 1949 Big Nine Conference football season. Led by first-year head coach Ivy Williamson, the Badgers compiled an overall record of 5–3–1 with a mark of 3–2–1 in conference play, placing fourth in the Big Nine. Red Wilson was the team's MVP for the third consecutive season and also the team's captain.

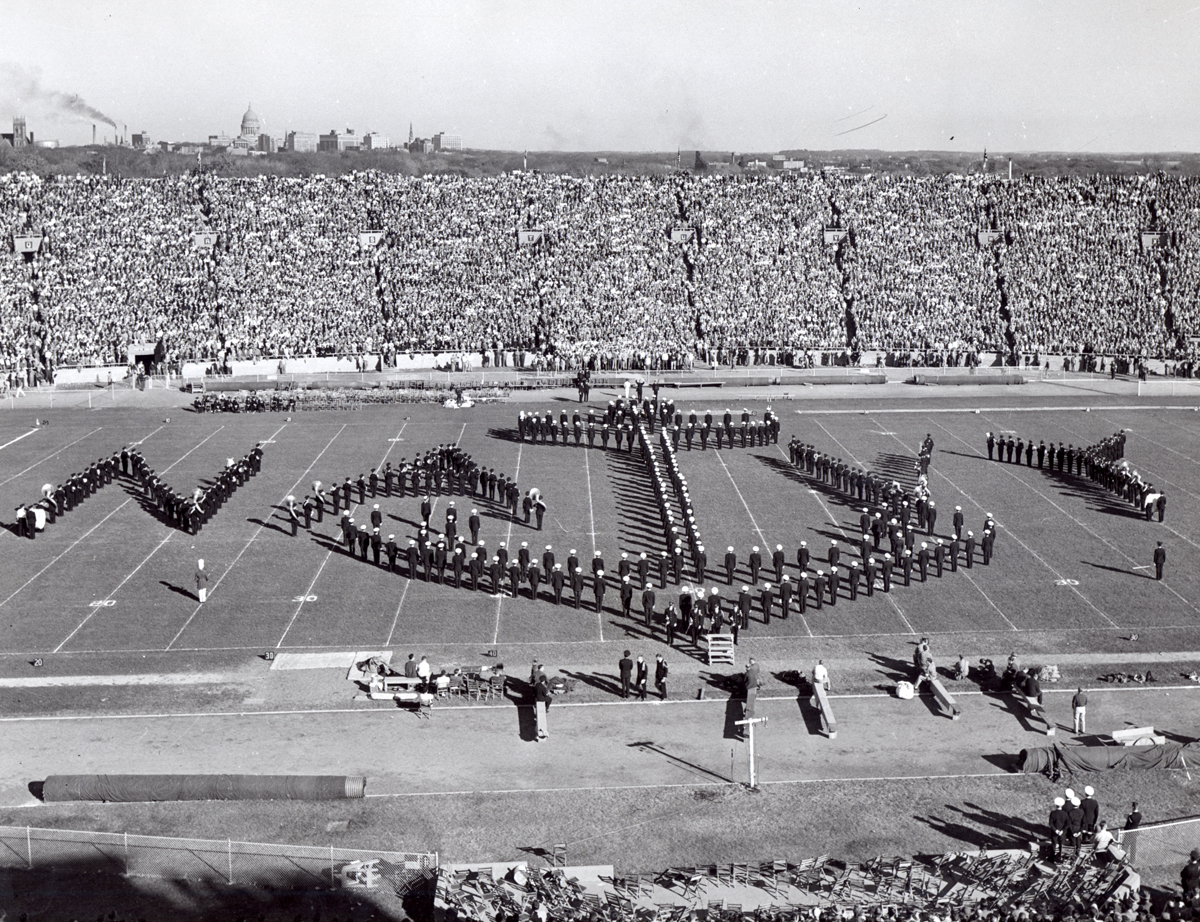
UW Band Greets Navy fans

== Schedule ==
Date	Opponent	Site	Result	Attendance
September 24	Marquette*	Camp Randall Stadium; Madison, WI	W 41–0	42,000
October 1	at Illinois	Memorial Stadium; Champaign, IL	T 13–13	38,332
October 8	No. 10 California*	Camp Randall Stadium; Madison, WI	L 20–35	44,000
October 15	No. 18 Navy*	Camp Randall Stadium; Madison, WI	W 48–13	45,000
October 22	Ohio State	Camp Randall Stadium; Madison, WI	L 0–21	45,000
October 29	at Indiana	Memorial Stadium; Bloomington, IN	W 30–14	30,000
November 5	at Northwestern	Dyche Field; Evanston, IL	W 14–6	51,000
November 12	Iowa^{†}	Camp Randall Stadium; Madison, WI (rivalry)	W 35-13	45,000
November 19	at No. 8 Minnesota	Memorial Stadium; Minneapolis, MN (rivalry)	L 6–14	64,110
*Non-conference game; ^{†}Homecoming; Rankings from AP Poll released prior to the game
