= Bob Momsen =

American football player (1929–2010)

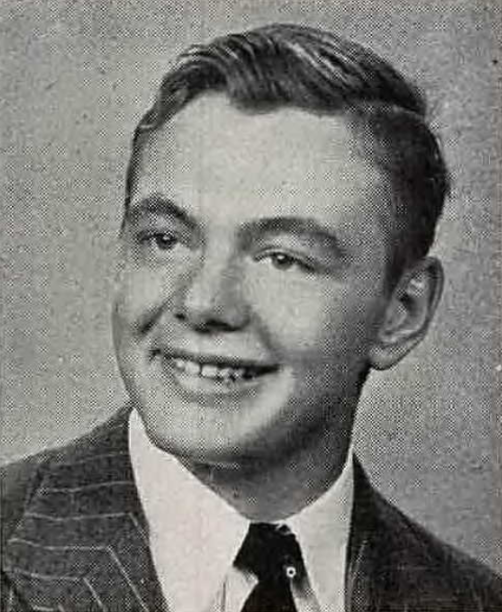
- Momsen from 1947 Edelian

No. 63, 68
- Positions: Guard, linebacker

Personal information
- Born: May 28, 1929; Toledo, Ohio, U.S.
- Died: May 25, 2010 (aged 80); Toledo, Ohio, U.S.
- Listed height: 6 ft 3 in (1.91 m)
- Listed weight: 225 lb (102 kg)

Career information
- High school: Libbey (Toledo)
- College: Ohio State
- NFL draft: 1951: 7th round, 80th overall pick

Career history
- Detroit Lions (1951); Chicago Cardinals (1952)*; San Francisco 49ers (1952)
- * Offseason or practice squad member only

Awards and highlights
- First-team All-American (1950); First-team All-Big Nine (1949)

Career NFL statistics
- Games played: 22
- Games started: 20
- Fumble recoveries: 2
- Stats at Pro Football Reference

Robert Edward Momsen (May 28, 1929 – May 25, 2010) was an American professional football player. He was a first-team All-American at Ohio State in 1950.

== Early life ==
Momsen was born in Toledo, Ohio, in 1929. He was the son of Rose and Anton Momsen, Sr., and the younger brother of Tony Momsen. Momsen and his brother Tony both attended Libbey High School.

== Ohio State ==
Brother Tony attended the University of Michigan, while Bob attended Ohio State University. Both brothers played college football and became adversaries in the Michigan–Ohio State football rivalry. Bob Momsen played at the guard and linebacker positions for the Ohio State Buckeyes while brother Tony played at the center and linebacker positions for the Michigan Wolverines. Bob Momsen was selected by the Football Writers Association of America as a first-team defensive player and on their 1950 College Football All-America Team.

The Momsen brothers are most remembered for their role in the famed 1950 Snow Bowl game between Michigan and Ohio State. The game was played in a blizzard, with weather conditions so inclement that Michigan punted on first down for its first two plays from scrimmage, after concluding that the best strategy was to keep the slick ball on the other side of the field and in the hands of Ohio State. The Buckeyes scored when Vic Janowicz kicked a field goal after Bob Momsen recovered a blocked Wolverine kick. With 47 seconds remaining in the first half, Tony Momsen blocked a Janowicz punt and fell on the ball in the end zone for a touchdown. The Wolverines won by a final score of 9–3. Bob Momsen later recalled, "Two brothers got more publicity for playing in a terrible football game than anyone ever deserves."

== Professional football ==
Both Momsen brothers went on to play in the National Football League (NFL). Bob was drafted by the Detroit Lions with the 80th pick in the 1951 NFL draft and played for the Lions during the 1951 NFL season. He also played for the San Francisco 49ers in the 1952 NFL season.

== Later life ==
After retiring as a professional football player, Momsen coached football at Northland College in Ashland, Wisconsin, before returning to Toledo in 1956. He coached high school football for 25 years at Libbey, Waite, and Macomber High Schools in Toledo. He was inducted into the Ohio State Athletics Hall of Fame in 2005. Momsen died in Toledo in 2010 at age 80.
