= Irv Wisniewski =

American football and basketball player and coach (1925–2014)

Biographical details
- Born: January 8, 1925; Toledo, Ohio, U.S.
- Died: February 26, 2014 (aged 89); Newark, Delaware, U.S.

Playing career

Football
- 1946–1949: Michigan

Basketball
- 1946–1950: Michigan
- Position: End (football)

Coaching career (HC unless noted)

Football
- 1951: Hillsdale
- 1952–1979: Delaware (assistant)

Basketball
- 1950–1952: Hillsdale
- 1954–1966: Delaware

Golf
- 1954–1963: Delaware

Head coaching record
- Overall: 2–6 (football); 124–179 (basketball)

Accomplishments and honors

Championships
- National (1948)

Irvin C. "Whiz" Wisniewski (January 8, 1925 – February 26, 2014) was an American football and basketball player and coach. He served as the head football coach at Hillsdale College in 1951, tallying a mark of 2–6. Wisniewski was also the head basketball coach at Hillsdale from 1950 to 1952 and at the University of Delaware from 1954 to 1966, compiling a career college basketball record of 124–179.

== Playing career ==
Wisniewski played football at the University of Michigan as an end from 1946 to 1949. He caught 11 passes for 126 yards and one touchdown as a senior for the 1949 Wolverines. He also played basketball at Michigan.

== Coaching career ==
Wisniewski was the head football coach at Hillsdale College in Hillsdale, Michigan for one season, in 1951, tallying a mark of 2–6.

== Legacy and honors ==
Wisniewski and his wife, Martha, owned and operated "Varsity Day Camp" a summer day camp for children located outside of Ann Arbor, Michigan. The camp started in 1950.

Wisniewski was inducted into the Woodward High School, Toledo, OH (Class of 1943) Hall of Fame in 1985. He was inducted into the Delaware Sports Hall of Fame in 2006.

== Death ==
Wisniewski died at his home in Delaware of a brief illness on February 26, 2014. He was 89 years old.

== Head coaching record ==
=== Football ===
Year	Team	Overall	Conference	Standing	Bowl/playoffs
Hillsdale Dales (Michigan Intercollegiate Athletic Association) (1951)
1951	Hillsdale	2–6	2–3	T–4th	
Hillsdale:		2–6	2–3		
Total:		2–6			
