= Harry Allis =

American football player (1928–2006)

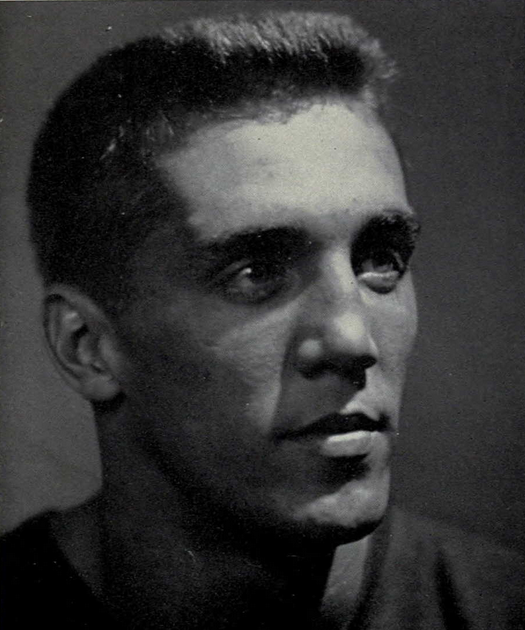

No. 88
- Positions: End, defensive end, placekicker, punter

Personal information
- Born: April 22, 1928
- Died: September 6, 2006 (aged 78)

Career information
- College: Michigan
- NFL draft: 1951: 27th round, 322nd overall pick

Career history
- 1948–1950: Michigan Wolverines

Awards and highlights
- National champion (1948)

Harry Dean Allis (April 22, 1928 – September 6, 2006) was an American football placekicker. He played college football for the University of Michigan from 1948 to 1950. He was the leading scorer in the Big Ten Conference during the 1948 season and helped lead the 1948 Michigan Wolverines football team to an undefeated 10–0 record and a national championship. He also helped lead the 1950 Michigan Wolverines football team to a Big Ten championship, including victories in the Snow Bowl and the 1951 Rose Bowl.

== Early life ==
Allis was born in 1928. He was raised in Flint, Michigan.

== University of Michigan ==
Allis enrolled at the University of Michigan in 1947. He played on the all-freshman football team coached by Wally Weber in 1947.

=== 1948 season ===
As a sophomore, Allis played for Michigan's 1948 national championship team that finished undefeated and untied with a 10–0 record. As a 20-year-old sophomore, Allis played at the end position for the 1948 and also handled placekicking and punting responsibilities. Serving in multiple roles, Allis scored 47 points for the Wolverines (three touchdowns and 29 extra point kicks) to become the leading scorer in the Big Ten Conference during the 1948 season. He also completed a streak of 14 straight extra point conversions without a miss. His scoring tally was as follows:

- 10/2/1948: 2 points on 2 extra point kicks against Oregon.
- 10/9/1948: 4 points on 4 extra point kicks against Purdue.
- 10/16/1948: 4 points on 4 extra point kicks against Northwestern.
- 10/23/1948: 3 points on 3 extra point kicks against Minnesota.
- 10/30/1948: 10 points on a 45-yard touchdown reception in the fourth quarter and 4 extra point kicks against Illinois. Allis also did most of the punting. The United Press noted: "End Harry Allis, a 20-year-old sophomore, and sheer luck were the biggest factor in Michigan's win triumph ..."
- 11/6/1948: 5 points on 5 extra point kicks against Navy.
- 11/13/1948: 12 points on a touchdown reception and 6 extra point kicks against Indiana. With 12 points against Indiana, Allis became the leading scorer in the Big Ten Conference with 33 points.
- 11/20/1948: 7 points on a 44-yard game-winning touchdown reception and an extra point kick in a 13–7 win over Ohio State.

=== 1949 team ===
As a junior, Allis started all nine games at the left end position for the 1949 Michigan Wolverines football team. The 1949 team finished the season with a 6–2–1 ranked #7 in the final AP Poll. He had a career-long 51-yard touchdown reception in a 13–0 win over Illinois in October 1949.

=== 1950 team ===
As a senior, Allis helped lead the 1950 Michigan Wolverines football team to the Big Ten Conference championship and a victory over California in the 1951 Rose Bowl. In the second game of the season, Allis had a 48-yard touchdown reception against Dartmouth. Allis also returned an interception 32 yards for a touchdown against Indiana and a punt 23 yards for a touchdown against Northwestern.

After the 1950 season, Allis was invited to play in the 1951 College All-Star Game in Chicago.

== Professional football ==
Allis was selected by the Detroit Lions in the 27th round of the 1951 NFL draft. He turned down an offer to play for the Lions to remain at the University of Michigan for graduate school studies in pharmacy. He signed with the Lions a year later in June 1952, but he was traded to the Chicago Cardinals in August 1952.

== Medical career and death ==
Allis ultimately chose medical school over professional football. He received his M.D. degree from the University of Michigan in 1959. He performed his internship and residency at Blodgett Memorial Hospital in Grand Rapids, Michigan, from 1959 to 1964. He took postgraduate training in lower extremity prosthetics and juvenile amputee management at Northwestern University. He practiced for many years as an orthopedic surgeon in East Lansing, Michigan. A malpractice case against Allis arising out of his treatment of a broken arm in 1981 resulted in a published decision affirming the jury's verdict in favor of Allis.

He died in September 2006.
