= 1949 All-Big Nine Conference football team =

The 1949 All-Big Nine Conference football team consists of American football players selected to the All-Big Nine Conference teams selected by the Associated Press (AP), United Press (UP) and the International News Service (INS) for the 1949 Big Nine Conference football season.

== All Big-Nine selections ==
=== Ends ===
- Bud Grant, Minnesota (AP-1, UP-1)
- Bob Wilson, Wisconsin (AP-1, UP-1)
- Jack Dittmer, Iowa (AP-2)
- Cliff Anderson, Indiana (AP-2)

=== Tackles ===
- Leo Nomellini, Minnesota (AP-1, UP-1)
- Alvin Wistert, Michigan (AP-1, UP-1)
- Dick O'Hanlon, Ohio State (AP-2)
- Lou Karras, Purdue (AP-2)

=== Guards ===
- Lloyd Heneveld, Michigan (AP-1, UP-1)
- Jack Lininger, Ohio State (AP-1)
- Charles Gottfried, Illinois (AP-2, UP-1)
- Robert Wahl, Michigan (AP-2)

=== Centers ===
- Clayton Tonnemaker, Minnesota (AP-1, UP-1)
- Joe Kelley, Wisconsin (AP-2)

=== Quarterbacks ===
- Don Burson, Northwestern (AP-1, UP-1)
- Pandel Savic, Ohio State (AP-2)

=== Halfbacks ===
- Chuck Ortmann, Michigan (AP-1, UP-1)
- Johnny Karras, Illinois (AP-1, UP-1)
- Bill Bye, Minnesota (AP-2)
- Bob Teague, Wisconsin (AP-2)

=== Fullbacks ===
- Jerry Krall, Ohio State (AP-1)
- Bob Momsen, Ohio State (UP-1)
- John Kerestes, Purdue (AP-2)

== Key ==
AP = Associated Press, chosen by conference coaches

UP = United Press

== See also ==
- 1949 College Football All-America Team
