= 1950 Rose Bowl =

American college football game

- 36th Rose Bowl Game
California Golden Bears	Ohio State Buckeyes
(10–0)	(6–1–2)
Pacific Coast	Big Ten
14	17
Head coach: Pappy Waldorf	Head coach: Wes Fesler
AP 3	AP 6
	1	2	3	4	Total
California	0	7	7	0	14
Ohio State	0	0	14	3	17
- Date: January 2, 1950
- Season: 1949
- Stadium: Rose Bowl
- Location: Pasadena, California
- MVP: Fred "Curly" Morrison (Ohio State FB)
- Favorite: California by 6 points
- Referee: William Blake (Big Ten; split crew: Big Ten, Pacific Coast)
- Attendance: 100,963

The 1950 Rose Bowl was the 36th edition of the college football bowl game, played at the Rose Bowl in Pasadena, California on Monday, January 2. The sixth-ranked Ohio State Buckeyes, champions of the Big Ten Conference, upset the undefeated No. 3 California Golden Bears, champions of the Pacific Coast Conference, 17–14.

Ohio State fullback Fred "Curly" Morrison was named the Player of the Game. Because New Year's Day was on Sunday in 1950, the bowl games were played the following day.

It was the Big Ten's fourth consecutive win in the Rose Bowl, and California's second straight loss.

== Scoring ==
First quarter

No scoring

Second quarter

- Cal – Jim Monachino 7-yard run (Cullom kick)

Third quarter

- OSU – Fred Morrison 1-yard run (Jimmy Hague kick)
- OSU – Jerry Krall 6-yard run (Hague kick)
- Cal – Monachino 40-yard run (Cullom kick)

Fourth quarter

- OSU – Hague 18-yard field goal

== Notes ==
- It was a rematch of the 1921 Rose Bowl, the first bowl game for both teams, won by Cal, 28–0.
- This was the first bowl game to have 100,000 spectators in attendance; the stadium's fourth expansion increased the capacity to 100,983.
