= Wally Teninga =

American football player and businessman (1928–2018)

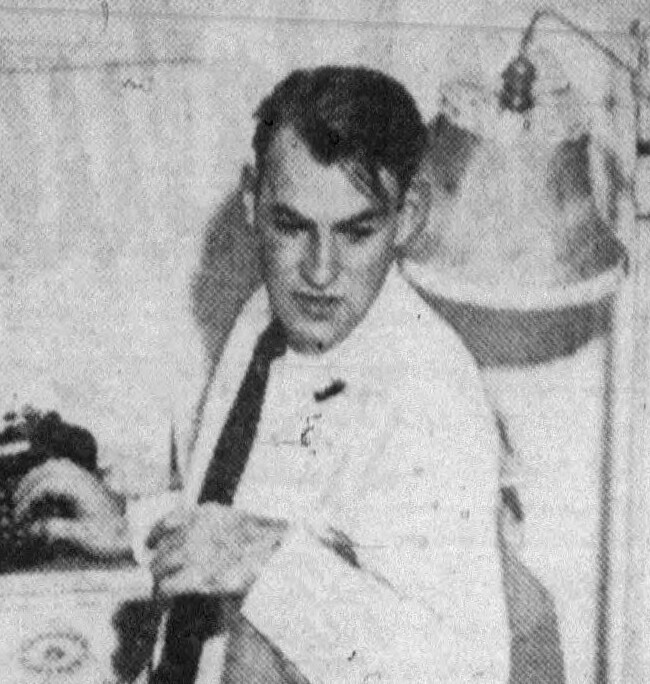
- Teninga in December 1947

Profile
- Position: Halfback

Personal information
- Born: February 14, 1928; Roseland, Chicago, Illinois, U.S.
- Died: September 24, 2018 (aged 90)

Career information
- College: Michigan
- NFL draft: 1949: 17th round, 166 (by the New York Giants)th overall pick

Awards and highlights
- National champion (1948)

Walter Henry "Wally" Teninga (February 14, 1928 - September 24, 2018) was an American football halfback and businessman. He played for the University of Michigan's undefeated national championship teams in 1947 and 1948 and later became the vice chairman and chief financial officer of the Kmart Corporation.

== Early life ==
A native of Chicago, Teninga was the son of Cornelius and Emma Teninga. He was the youngest of five children and grew up at 10718 Normal Avenue in the Roseland section of Chicago's south side. He attended Morgan Park High School where he was a starting halfback for three years on the varsity team.

== University of Michigan ==
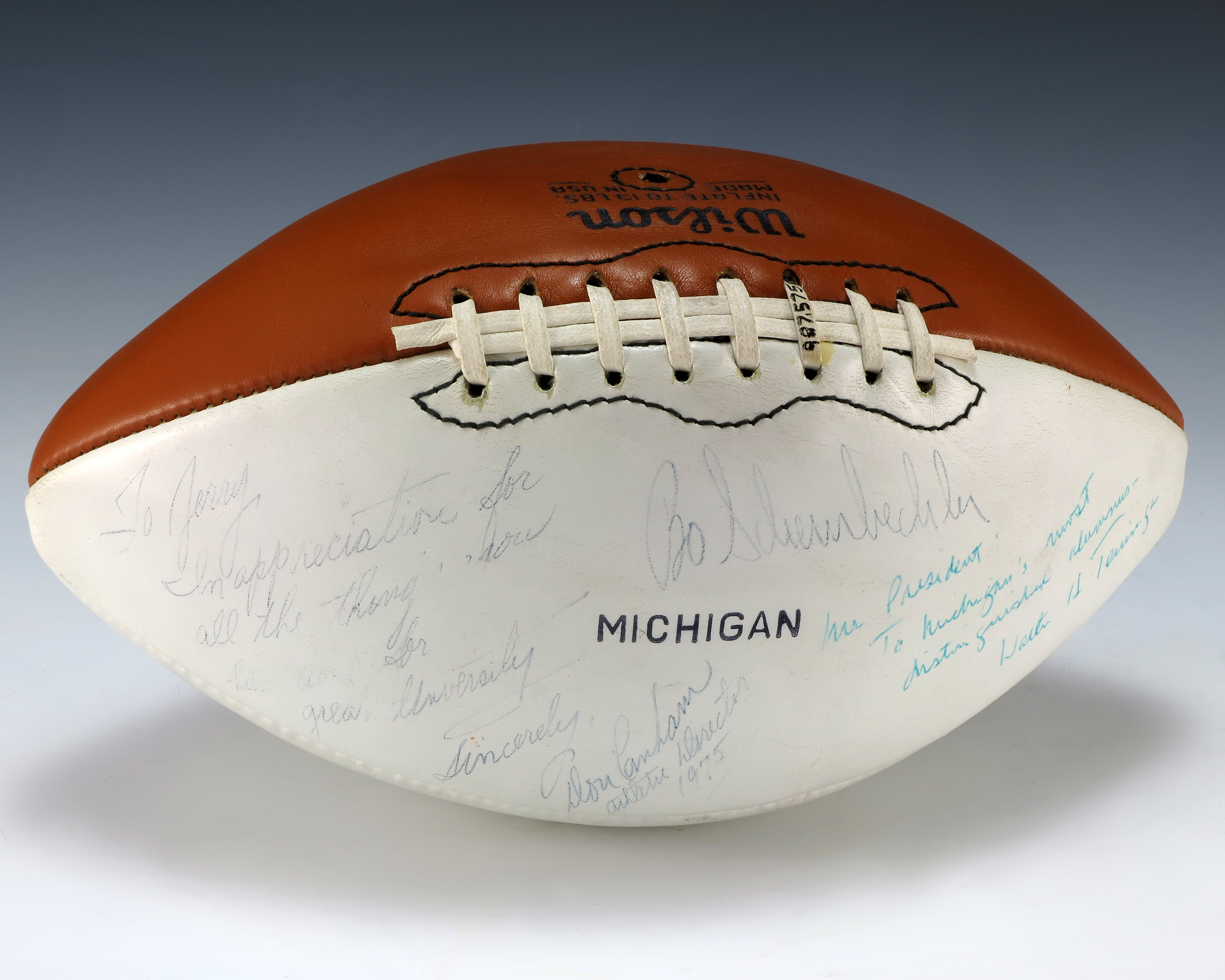
A football signed by Don Canham, Bo Schembechler, and Wally Teninga, and given to President Gerald Ford, who had himself played football for the Michigan Wolverines

Teninga enrolled at the University of Michigan where he played football for the Michigan Wolverines football teams from 1945 and 1947 to 1949. He was a member of the 1945 team that first employed the two-platoon system of football in a game against Army in Yankee Stadium. At age 17, Teninga started seven games at left halfback for the 1945 Wolverines, and was the Wolverines' leading ground gainer.

Teninga missed the 1946 season while serving in the U.S. Army. He returned to Ann Arbor in 1947 and was a member of the university's undefeated national championship teams of 1947 and 1948. In 1947, Teninga was the team's punter, defensive right halfback, and second string offensive halfback behind Bob Chappuis and Bump Elliott.

In 1948, he shared the right halfback position with Leo Koceski and also handled punting duties, averaging 41.5 yards per punt. A newspaper profile of Teninga in 1949 described his versatility as a backfield player:

"He passes sufficiently well and Oosterbaan has no doubts of his ability to handle Michigan's multipronged offense. . . . Teninga, now taking reserve officer's training at Camp Lee, has had an odd career at Michigan. One of Fritz Crisler's gallant 17 year olds in '45, he divided the tailback with Pete Elliott. Then he was in the Army for two years. When Teninga returned in '47, Fritz Crisler had his Magicians, Yerges, Bump Elliott, Bob Chappuis and Jack Weisenberger. Walt became the handy man, drilling at four positions but seeing little play at any. Teninga's punting is one reason Oosterbaan would like to have him a regular. Under new substitution rules, a coach needs a solid kicker in his offensive unit at all times. Otherwise he may have to use a valuable time out."

Sports writer John Mayhew called Teninga "one of Michigan's finest all-around football players," and referred to him as "a great 'insurance' member of the squad, often filling in the backfield at critical times without taking anything from the squad effort." After Teninga graduated in 1950, Mayhew posed the question of who would become the "Teninga" of the 1950 squad.

Teninga was drafted 166th overall in the 17th round of the 1949 NFL draft by the New York Giants. He elected instead to return to Michigan to play his fourth season of college football for the Michigan Wolverines. In the 1949 college football season, Teninga scored the game-winning touchdown in a 14–7 win over Minnesota and threw a touchdown pass to Leo Koceski for Michigan's only score in a 7–7 tie with Ohio State. He was also a major contributor in Michigan's 14–0 win over Illinois in 1949, forcing and recovering an Illinois fumble, launching a 69-yard punt, and making key tackles on defense. After the 1949 season, Teninga played on the East All-Star team at the East-West Shrine Game in San Francisco. Teninga intercepted a pass thrown by the Western All-Stars' quarterback to help lead the East team to a 28–6 victory.

Teninga was elected as Michigan's senior class president in 1949 with a campaign that included passing out little white candy balls and the slogan emphasizing his halfback duties for the football team: "Carry the ball for Teninga — and let Teninga carry the ball for you."

== Business career ==
Teninga graduated in 1950 with a degree in economics and returned to Chicago to work in his father's real estate business, Teninga Real Estate Co. Teninga worked for his father's company for five-and-a-half years before accepting a position in the mid-1950s with S.S. Kresge Co. With the Kresge company, Teninga was originally assigned to work in Detroit. He later spent seven years in Los Angeles, during which time he became the company's western region manager. Subsequently, he returned to the Detroit area while he was serving Director of Corporate Growth he enrolled as a candidate for an MBA degree in a 2-year evening program conducted by Michigan State University from which he graduated in 1971. He was promoted in April 1972 to vice chairman and chief financial and development officer of S.S. Kresge Co. and Kmart. Teninga lived for many years in Bloomfield Hills, Michigan with his wife, the former Nancy Anne Neumann of Birmingham, Michigan. Teninga retired from Kmart in 1979, and went to work for Sol Price's company, Price Club, an innovator in the retail warehouse store concept. He later returned to Chicago where he started and ran Wholesale Club, Inc., doing business as "The Warehouse Club," a competitor of the Price Club in the 1980s. Teninga also served on the board of directors of SITE Centers, a real estate investment trust, from the time of its initial public offering in 1993 until his retirement in 1998.

In 1975, Teninga was inducted into the Roseland-Pullman area Sports Hall of Fame.
