= Lou Karras =

American football player (1927–2018)

No. 70
- Position: Defensive tackle

Personal information
- Born: September 19, 1927; Gary, Indiana, U.S.
- Died: September 20, 2018 (aged 91); Coral Springs, Florida, U.S.
- Listed height: 6 ft 4 in (1.93 m)
- Listed weight: 241 lb (109 kg)

Career information
- High school: Emerson (Gary)
- College: Purdue
- NFL draft: 1950: 3rd round, 32nd overall pick

Career history
- Washington Redskins (1950–1952)

Awards and highlights
- Second-team All-Big Nine (1949)

Career NFL statistics
- Fumble recoveries: 2
- Stats at Pro Football Reference

Louis George Karras (September 19, 1927 – September 20, 2018) was an American professional football defensive tackle in the National Football League (NFL) for the Washington Redskins, until an eye injury prematurely ended his career. He played college football at Purdue University. Karras was drafted 32nd overall in the third round of the 1950 NFL draft. He had two younger brothers, former pro football player Ted Karras and former pro-football player/actor Alex Karras.

Karras had a college career at Purdue; he was a three-year starter (1946, 1948–49), was selected 2nd Team All-Big Ten in 1949. He was named the MVP for Purdue in 1949. Following his college career, he was selected for the 1949 East-West Shrine Game, the 1950 Chicago-based College All-Star Game and the 1950 Hula Bowl. After his professional football career ended, he founded a successful tire business. He was also on the city council of Gary, Indiana.
