= Alvin Wistert =

American football player (1916–2005)

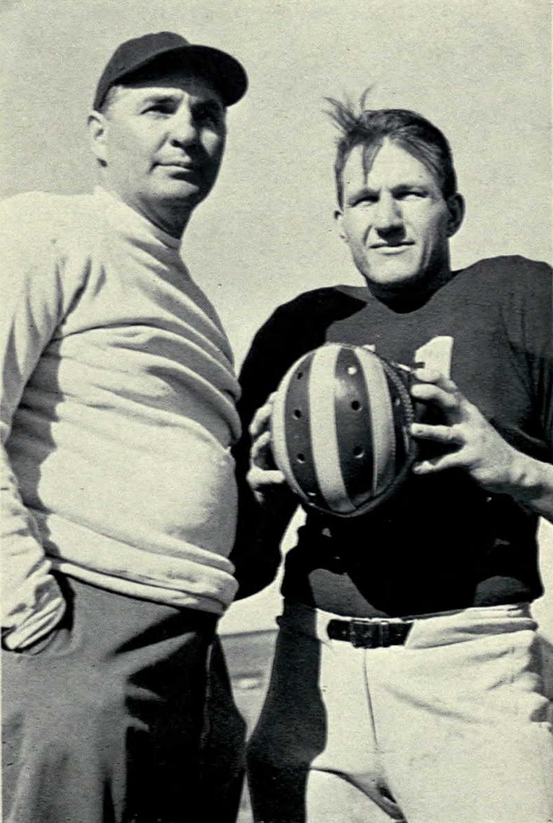
- Wistert (right) with Coach Bennie Oosterbaan in 1949

No. 11
- Positions: Offensive tackle, defensive tackle

Personal information
- Born: June 26, 1916; Chicago, Illinois, U.S.
- Died: October 3, 2005 (aged 89); Northville, Michigan, U.S.
- Listed height: 6 ft 3 in (1.91 m)
- Listed weight: 223 lb (101 kg)

Career information
- College: Boston University (1946); Michigan (1946–1949)

Awards and highlights
- 2× National champion (1947, 1948); Consensus All-American (1948, 1949); 2× First-team All-Big Nine (1948, 1949); Michigan Wolverines No. 11 retired
- College Football Hall of Fame (Class of 1981)

Alvin Lawrence "Moose" Wistert (June 26, 1916 – October 3, 2005) was an American football offensive tackle. He played college football for the Boston University Terriers in 1946 and for the Michigan Wolverines from 1947 to 1949. He began his collegiate football career at age 30 following 12 years of working in a factory and serving in the United States Marine Corps during World War II. He played at the defensive tackle position for the undefeated 1947 and 1948 Michigan Wolverines football teams, both of which finished the season ranked No. 1 in the final Associated Press poll. He was the oldest college football player selected as a College Football All-American, having been selected to the 1948 College Football All-America Team at age 32 and the 1949 team at age 33.

He was the last of the three Wistert brothers—along with older brother Whitey and younger brother Albert—to play for the Michigan Wolverines football team. All three Wistert brothers played at the tackle position, were selected as consensus All-Americans, and were later inducted into the College Football Hall of Fame. Alvin was the last of the three brothers to be inducted into the College Football Hall of Fame, receiving the honor in 1973. The Wistert brothers all wore jersey No. 11 at Michigan and are among the seven players who have had their numbers retired by the Michigan Wolverines football program. Their number will be put back into circulation starting on November 10, 2012, before a Michigan home game against the Northwestern Wildcats as part of the Michigan Football Legend program. The Legends program was discontinued in July 2015, and the numbers again permanently retired.

== Early life ==
Wistert was born in 1916 in Chicago, Illinois. His parents, Kazimir J. Wistert and Josephine (Shukis) Wistert, immigrated to the United States from Lithuania in 1894 and were married at Chicago in 1907. His father was a policeman in Chicago from at least 1910 to 1927. At the time of the 1920 United States census, Wistert's family lived at 5647 Waveland Avenue in Chicago's 27th Ward and consisted of parents, Kazimir and Josephine, and five children: Josephine (age 11), Isabelle (age 10), Francis (age 7), Evelyn (age 6), and Alvin (age 3-1/2).

Wistert's father was shot while on duty and pursuing a robbery suspect in July 1926. By the spring of 1927, Wistert's father, who had served in the U.S. Army from 1898 to 1901, was disabled due to "chest emphysema with draining sinus" and was admitted to the U.S. National Home for Disabled Volunteer Soldiers in Milwaukee, Wisconsin. He died in June 1927 when Alvin was 10 years old.

Wistert's mother, Josephine, used money from her husband's war pension and the Policemen's Benefit Association to keep the family together and to educate her six children. At the time of the 1930 United States census, Wistert's family continued to live at 5647 Waveland Avenue in Chicago. The household at that time consisted of Wistert's mother, Josephine, and five children: Josephine (age 22, employed as a bookkeeper), Francis (age 18, employed as a tube maker for a radio company), Evelyn (age 16, employed as a "saleslady" at a variety store), Alvin (age 13), and Albert (age 8).

Wistert attended Carl Schurz High School in Chicago, but dropped out. He did not play football in high school. After leaving high school, Wistert worked in a factory for several years. With the income from his factory job, he helped pay for his younger brother, Albert, to attend the University of Michigan. His mother later recalled, "He told me he'd stay out of school for a few years and work so Albert, the baby boy of the family, could go on to school."

In 1940, he enlisted in the United States Marine Corps, spending four years overseas during World War II. Wistert later recalled that he was often confused with his brother Al Wistert who played both college and professional football. In 1982, he told an interviewer that an officer approached him in 1944, "shook my hand and said 'I saw you play in Philly and at Michigan.'" When Wistert explained that it was his younger brother Albert who had played football, the officer "wiped off his handshake, turned on his heels and walked away." According to Wistert, "that so affronted me that I wrote my kid brother and said I'm going to try to get back to school."

== College athletics ==
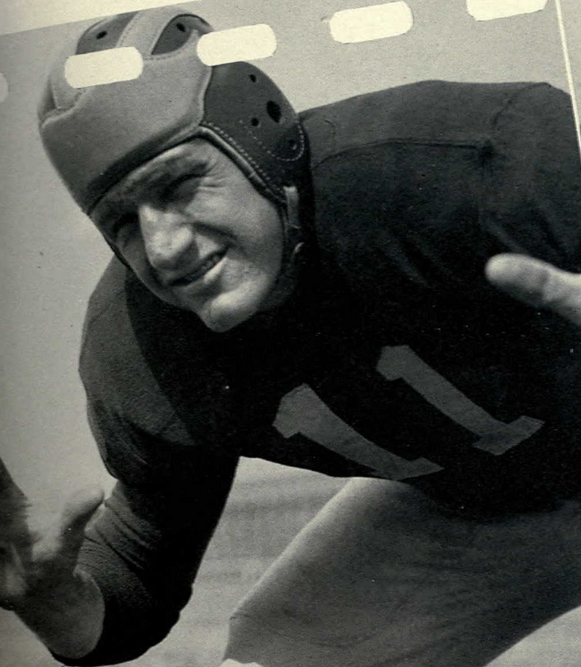
Wistert from the 1950 Michiganensian

After his discharge from the Marine Corps, Wistert worked for Procter & Gamble Soap Company in Massachusetts. He learned that Boston University was offering high school equivalency tests that would allow him to enroll there. Using the post-war G.I. Bill, Wistert spent one semester at Boston University and played for the school's football team as a 30-year-old freshman.

After one semester at Boston University, Wistert transferred to the University of Michigan. He was the last of the Wistert brothers to play for the Michigan Wolverines football team where he, like his brothers Francis and Albert before him, wore number 11, which was retired by the University of Michigan but will be re-issued starting November 10, 2012, before a home game against Northwestern as part of the new Michigan Football Legend program. In the spring of 1947, Wistert won the Meyer Morton Award as the most improved player during Michigan's spring football practice. Wistert played defensive left tackle for the undefeated 1947 Michigan Wolverines football team that became known as "The Mad Magicians", and is considered to be the greatest Michigan football team of all time. Wistert later recalled the tight competition to play for the 1947 team: "There were players of almost equal ability on the first two teams. You had to play at your peak because there was someone who could always step in. Also, there was a good balance. A good mixture of youth and maturity." At 230 pounds, Wistert was the largest player on the 1947 Michigan team. In addition to being the largest player, he was also the oldest. Wistert recalled, "When I played football for Michigan in 1947, opponents would say, 'Here comes Pappy and his kids again.' I was a 30-year-old college freshman. I was 13 years older than some of the other players."

As a junior, Wistert was selected as a consensus All-American while playing for the undefeated 1948 Michigan team that finished the season ranked #1 in the Associated Press poll. In October 1948, Michigan helped secure Michigan's 19th consecutive victory with a blocked punt at the 12-yard-line of the Minnesota Golden Gophers. Michigan recovered the ball at the one-yard line and scored a touchdown on the next play. The 1948 team also set a Rose Bowl record defeating U.S.C. 49–0.

After the 1948 season, Wistert was unanimously chosen as the team captain of the 1949 team. He was selected as a consensus All-American for the second straight year in 1949.

When Wistert played his final game for Michigan in November 1949, the Detroit Free Press offered to fly his mother, Josephine, to the game to watch her son play. She had never seen one of her sons' football games in person but listened to the games on the radio. She declined the invitation, noting that she had been ill would listen to the game on the radio while looking at her sons' pictures. Interviewed by Lyall Smith, she expressed her particular pride for Alvin's accomplishments:

I am the proudest mother in the world. But I am proudest of all about Alvin. It hasn't been easy for him to go to school, you know. He had the hard way and that's why I am so happy his teammates made him captain this year and that he was picked by you sportswriters as an All-America ...

The Sporting News published a photograph in December 1949 of Wistert's mother "Cheering Alvin's Final Game" while listening on the radio with a Michigan pennant and photographs of her three sons visible in the background.

Wistert was inducted into the College Football Hall of Fame in 1973 as the third Wistert brother so honored. In 1981, he was also inducted into the University of Michigan Athletic Hall of Honor in the fourth class of inductees alongside his brothers. Only five Michigan football players earned this honor before him.

== Later life and family ==
After graduating from Michigan, Wistert worked in the insurance business. In 1950, he was employed as a general agent for Federal Life & Casualty in Ann Arbor. He later worked as a manufacturer's representative. In November 1982, the 66-year-old Wistert was working as a sales representative for Owens-Illinois. He lived in Northville, Michigan, in his later years and died in October 2005 at age 89.

Wistert had two daughters and four grandchildren. His only grandson, Jason Alvin Neeser, played basketball at Dartmouth College.

== See also ==
- List of Michigan Wolverines football All-Americans
- University of Michigan Athletic Hall of Honor
