= Fred Morrison (American football) =

American football player and executive (1926–2020)

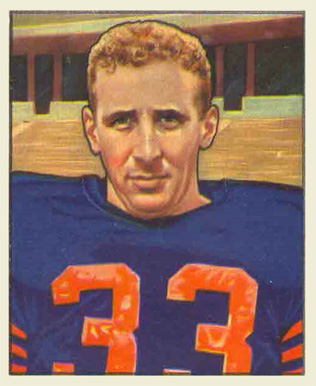
- Morrison on a 1950 Bowman football card

No. 15, 32
- Positions: Fullback, halfback

Personal information
- Born: October 7, 1926; Columbus, Ohio, U.S.
- Died: November 15, 2020 (aged 94); Murrieta, California, U.S.
- Listed height: 6 ft 2 in (1.88 m)
- Listed weight: 215 lb (98 kg)

Career information
- High school: Upper Arlington (Upper Arlington, Ohio)
- College: Ohio State (1946–1949)
- NFL draft: 1950: 1st round, 10th overall pick

Career history
- Chicago Bears (1950–1953); Cleveland Browns (1954–1956)

Awards and highlights
- 2× NFL champion (1954, 1955); Second-team All-Pro (1955); Pro Bowl (1955)

Career NFL statistics
- Rushing yards: 2,420
- Rushing average: 4.2
- Receptions: 67
- Receiving yards: 721
- Total touchdowns: 14
- Stats at Pro Football Reference

Fred Lew "Curly" Morrison (October 7, 1926 – November 15, 2020) was an American professional football player and executive. He played professionally in the National Football League (NFL) with the Chicago Bears, from 1950 to 1953, and the Cleveland Browns, from 1954 to 1956. Morrison played college football at the Ohio State University.

== College career ==
Morrison played for the Ohio State Buckeyes from 1947 to 1949. As a sophomore, he was an end and led the Buckeyes in receptions, with seven for 113 yards. In his junior year, he moved to fullback when starter Joe Whistler was injured in the first game of the 1948 season. When Whistler returned, Morrison continued at fullback as a backup.

Morrison took over the fullback position as a senior in 1949 and led the Buckeyes in scoring, with nine touchdowns. His best rushing game as a college student was against the USC Trojans, in Los Angeles, on October 8, 1949 when he rushed for 134 yards. Later that season, the Buckeyes returned to Southern California for the 1950 Rose Bowl against the California Golden Bears. In that game, Morrison rushed for 119 yards, and the Buckeyes won 17–14. Morrison was named the game's MVP. He was inducted into the Rose Bowl Hall of Fame in 1993.

== Professional career ==
Morrison was drafted by the Chicago Bears with the tenth pick in the 1950 NFL draft. He was with the Bears for four years, leading the team in rushing two of those years. He was traded to the Cleveland Browns, where he spent three more years and played in three championship games. He led the Browns in rushing once (1955), making his only Pro Bowl appearance that year.

== NFL career statistics ==
Legend
	Won the NFL championship
	Led the league
**Bold**	Career high

=== Regular season ===
Year	Team	Games		Rushing					Receiving				
Year	Team	GP	GS	Att	Yds	Avg	Lng	TD	Rec	Yds	Avg	Lng	TD
1950	CHI	12	2	66	252	3.8	25	1	13	86	6.6	15	0
1951	CHI	12	3	29	96	3.3	26	0	1	-3	-3.0	-3	0
1952	CHI	12	7	95	367	3.9	**57**	**3**	10	129	12.9	39	**1**
1953	CHI	12	8	95	307	3.2	17	2	**16**	**214**	13.4	44	0
1954	CLE	12	2	54	234	4.3	26	2	12	81	6.8	16	0
1955	CLE	12	8	**156**	**824**	**5.3**	56	**3**	9	185	**20.6**	**49**	0
1956	CLE	12	6	83	340	4.1	41	1	6	29	4.8	10	**1**
		84	36	578	2,420	4.2	57	12	67	721	10.8	49	2

=== Playoffs ===
Year	Team	Games		Rushing					Receiving				
Year	Team	GP	GS	Att	Yds	Avg	Lng	TD	Rec	Yds	Avg	Lng	TD
1950	CHI	1	1	5	14	2.8	8	**1**	**2**	**44**	**22.0**	**26**	0
1954	CLE	1	0	10	19	1.9	**13**	**1**	0	0	0.0	0	0
1955	CLE	1	1	**11**	**33**	**3.0**	5	0	1	7	7.0	7	0
		3	2	26	66	2.5	13	2	3	51	17.0	26	0

== Executive career and retirement ==
Following his NFL career, Morrison stayed active in football. He was the chief operating officer and general manager for the Los Angeles Express of the United States Football League (USFL) and the general manager of the Southern California Sun of the World Football League (WFL). He was an advocate for retired NFL players and was active in several charities. He and his wife, Sophie, produced the NFL Legends golf tournament in Pebble Beach, California every November benefiting The Boys and Girls Clubs of California.

He died of complications from a broken hip on November 15, 2020.
