= Dick Kempthorn =

American football player (1926–2019)

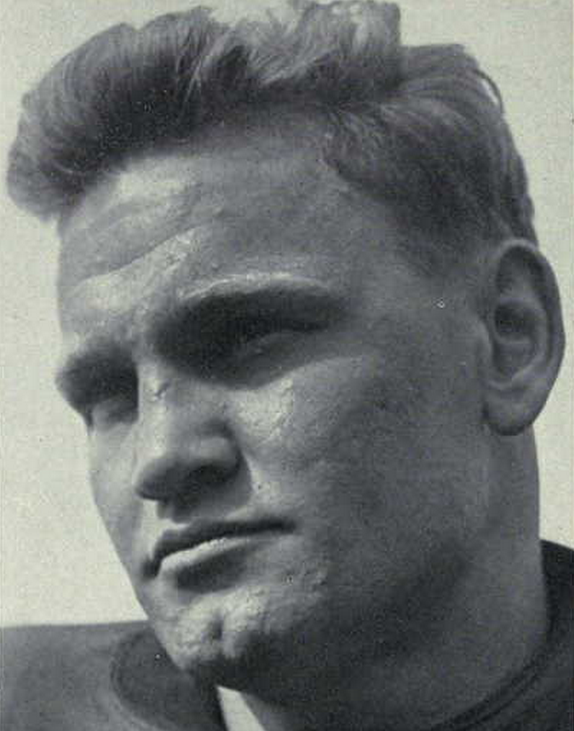
- Kempthorn, 1948

Profile
- Position: Fullback

Personal information
- Born: October 23, 1926; Canton, Ohio, U.S.
- Died: February 8, 2019 (aged 92); Canton, Ohio, U.S.

Career information
- College: Michigan

Awards and highlights
- National champion (1948); Second-team All-American (1949)

Richard James Kempthorn (October 23, 1926 – February 8, 2019) was an American collegiate athlete, Air Force pilot, and businessman from Canton, Ohio, US. He played college football on the undefeated national champion 1947 and 1948 Michigan Wolverines football teams and was the Most Valuable Player on the 1949 team. He later served as a jet fighter pilot in the Korean War where he received the Distinguished Flying Cross. He turned down an opportunity to play professional football to join his father in the automobile business. Over the next 50 years, Kempthorn built a series of automobile dealerships in Canton, Ohio.

== Youth ==
Kempthorn is a native of Canton, Ohio. He played high school football for Canton McKinley High School. Kempthorn was a starter at quarterback and linebacker in high school, and in two years of varsity football, his teams went 16–2–2 and won a state championship.

== College football ==
=== Miami University and the Merchant Marine ===
After graduating from high school, he was admitted to the United States Merchant Marine Academy in San Mateo, California. Before starting at the Academy, Kempthorn attended the Miami University in Oxford, Ohio, where he played in six football games for the Redskins under Coach Sid Gillman.

After several weeks of training at the Merchant Marine Academy, Kempthorn was assigned to serve as an engine cadet on the crew of the cargo ship, USS Wild Hunter, which participated in the invasion of the Philippines.

=== Transfer to Michigan ===
After the end of World War II, Kempthorn visited Michigan and decided to transfer to Michigan rather than returning to complete his studies at the Merchant Marine Academy. Unable to play in 1946 due to the transfer rule, Kempthorn played with Coach Wally Weber's team of reserve players and ineligibles. When Kempthorn laid out two varsity players in a scrimmage, Coach Fritz Crisler reportedly told Weber to "get that wild man out of there." Weber said, "He's the roughest young man we've had around here since the late Bill Hewitt. He's strewn the landscape with football humanity."

Kempthorn first played with the Wolverines during 1947 spring practice. At that time, Kempthorn impressed Michigan's coaches with his drive on offense and hard tackling on defense; he was described as "rugged and beautifully proportioned but green and crude." Even before he played a regular season game, Kempthorn was tagged as "one of the finest fullbacks ever to enroll at Michigan."

=== 1947 season ===
Kempthorn joined a 1947 Michigan football team that was loaded with talent returning from the war. The team went undefeated in the regular season, beat USC 49–0 in the 1948 Rose Bowl game, outscored its opponents 394–53 and was selected by the ESPN Big Ten College Football Encyclopedia as the best team in the history of Michigan football. The 1947 team is also remembered as the first team fully to embrace the concept of defensive and offensive specialization. Previously, most players had played their positions on both offense and defense. But in 1947, Coach Fritz Crisler established separate offensive and defensive squads.

At the outset of the season, Kempthorn won the starting job at fullback. Kempthorn scored a touchdown on his second carry in the 1947 season opener, a 55–0 win against Michigan State. In only his third game for Michigan, against Pittsburgh, Kempthorn sustained a knee injury. Kempthorn missed three games due to the knee injury and returned to star on defense against Indiana. Kempthorn was back on the injury list after the Indiana game and later recalled that, after the knee injury, he was unable to execute the spinning movement required of a back in the single wing offense.

In the 1948 Rose Bowl, USC penetrated deep into Michigan's territory only once, and Kempthorn ended that drive with an interception on the 11-yard line.

=== 1948 season ===
After missing the opening game of the 1948 season with a pulled muscle, Kempthorn did not see much action on offense but won respect for his play at linebacker with the defensive unit. In the second game of the season, Kempthorn stood out on defense, leading a defensive stand in which the Wolverines stopped the Oregon on four straight plays from inside the five-yard line. The United Press called linebackers Kempthorn and Dan Dworsky the "defensive mainstays" of a defense that gave up only 44 points in the 1948 season. The 1948 team finished 8–0 and was ranked No. 1 in the final Associated Press poll.

=== 1949 season ===
During his senior season in 1949, Kempthorn was used chiefly as a linebacker on the defensive squad, although he also saw considerable offensive duty as a fullback. After a victory of Minnesota, the Associated Press published a profile of Kempthorn describing him as follows

Dick Kempthorn, Michigan's touch blond fullback, is good at both offense and defense. That's on the record book and none can dispute it. But he'll go down in the fan's book as a line backer deluxe, a role he played with magnificent effect as Michigan went unbeaten in 1947–48. ... His vicious tackling was the keynote of the inspired Michigan line that made a shambles of a Minnesota team that was rated one of the best in years.

After the 1949 season, the Michigan players voted to award the Most Valuable Player award to Kempthorn.

The 1950 Michiganensian Yearbook said of Kempthorn

Dick Kempthorn – Destined to go down in football history as one of the finest line backers ever to come from the Mid-West, Dick Kempthorn wound up his grid career with a resounding pat on the back from his teammates who voted him the well-deserved honor of 'Most Valuable Player.' Seeing only limited offensive action 'the Killer' was generally overlooked by All-American selectors, an omission disputed by those who had witnessed explosive Kempthorn tackles on play after play of every Wolverine contest.

Kempthorn was selected to play on three College All-Star teams while playing at Michigan from 1947–1949.

=== Kempthorn's gloves in the 1950 "Snow Bowl" ===
Kempthorn stayed on briefly to help Bennie Oosterbaan as an assistant backfield coach in 1950. That fall, his pigskin gloves played a key role in the infamous "Snow Bowl" victory over Ohio State. The game was played in a blizzard that shut down both offenses, and the punting game became the key. Michigan won the game, 9–3, despite never getting a first down. The teams punted 45 times, sometimes on first down. The strategy was based on the weather in that both teams felt it better to have the ball in the hands of their opponents near the end zone and hope for a fumble of the slippery ball. In the end, Michigan won with a touchdown scored after blocking a punt.

Chuck Ortmann was Michigan's punter, and his fingers were becoming numb in the freezing weather. Kempthorn had purchased a new pair of pigskin gloves for the Ohio trip and gave them to Ortmann early in the game when Ortmann complained that his hands were getting numb. Ortmann later joked that they "were not masculine gloves but dainty tight fitting little numbers." But the gloves gave Ortmann a perfect grip on the ball. Ortmann noted that even though the gloves became soaked, "the wet ball stuck to them like glue." It was Ortmann's error-free punting that won the game for the Wolverines. Kempthorn's gloves, described in may articles as formal "junior prom" gloves, were credited with having won Michigan the game and a trip to the Rose Bowl.

== Later life ==
=== Rejection of professional football ===
Kempthorn was the 123rd pick in the 1948 NFL draft (by the Philadelphia Eagles) and the second round pick of the Cleveland Browns in the 1949 AAFC Secret Draft. However, Kempthorn bypassed professional football and instead opted to return to Canton, Ohio to join his father's Dodge-Plymouth automobile dealership. One sports columnist wrote the following about Kempthorn's decision

Dick Kempthorn, Michigan's great linebacker who could name his own price in pro football, says he wants no part of pro ball. He'll work for his father, who is in the automotive business in Canton, Ohio, after graduation. Draft rights for Kempthorn, rated the deadliest tackler Michigan has produced in almost three decades, are held by the Cleveland Browns and Philadelphia Eagles.

=== Heroism in the Korean War ===
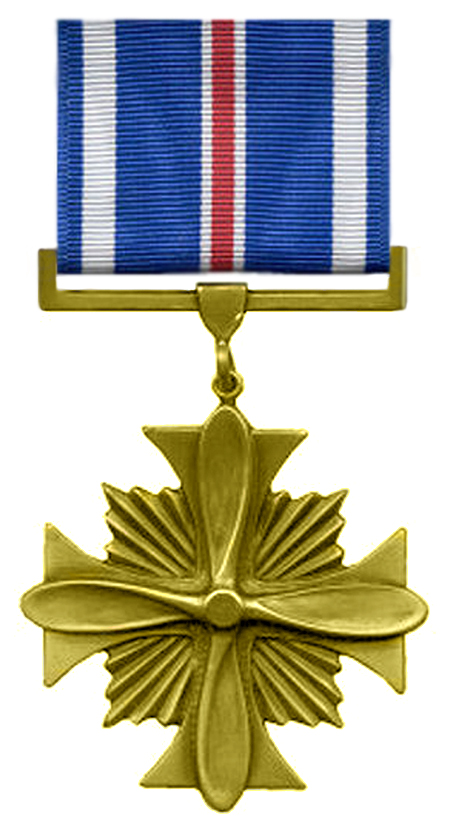
Kempthorn received the Distinguished Flying Cross

When the Korean War broke out, Kempthorn joined the United States Air Force and spent three years as a pilot. He flew more than 100 missions as a jet fighter pilot and received the Distinguished Flying Cross for bravery. In March 1953, Kempthorn was recognized for heroism after he rescued fellow pilot, Henry Rock, from a burning fighter plane in Japan. After Rock's plane crashed on the runway, Kempthorn sprinted 200 yards to the crash scene, jumped on the wing and ripped loose the bullet-proof glass canopy. With Rock trapped by the gunsight as flames burned Rock's face and hands, Kempthorn took the gunsight in his bare hands and broke off the mounting. Shortly after Rock was freed, the plane exploded.

In June 1953, three months after Kempthorn was cited for bravery, the 1947 team held a five-year reunion. Kempthorn's former teammates and Coach Crisler all signed a football and sent it to him in Korea. Newspapers covered the long-distance gift, and one reporter wrote

Lt. Richard Kempthorn, jet fighter pilot with the army airforce in Korea, doesn't know it yet but he's about to receive a present that he'll undoubtedly cherish the rest of his life. Mighty Dick, one of the great linebackers in football history, was one of the line-wrecking crew of Michigan's championship 1947–48 teams, and now he's doing an even finer job as a fighter pilot with more than 60 missions behind him in Korea.

=== Kempthorn Automall in Canton ===
In 1953, Kempthorn returned to Canton, Ohio where he returned to work in his father's car dealership. Cleveland Browns Coach Paul Brown tried to persuade Kempthorn to play professional football, but Kempthorn decided to work for his father. Kempthorn bought the business from his father in 1964 and expanded it from a Dodge-Plymouth dealership into a business called "Dick Kempthorn Car Sales" selling multiple brands of automobiles and trucks. As of 2004, the 77-year-old Kempthorn was still working at the car dealership with his three children. The business has now expanded into the Kempthorn Auto Mall in Canton, which includes Kempthorn-owned dealerships for Mercedes-Benz, Volvo, Mazda, Volkswagen, and Jaguar.

== University of Michigan Athletic Hall of Honor ==
In 1992, Kempthorn was inducted into the University of Michigan Athletic Hall of Honor.

== See also ==
- University of Michigan Athletic Hall of Honor
