= Jack Lininger =

American football player (1927–2002)

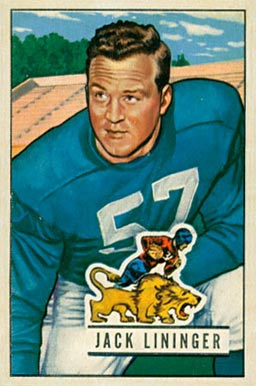
- Lininger on a 1951 Bowman football card

No. 57, 55
- Positions: Linebacker, center

Personal information
- Born: June 27, 1927; Van Wert, Ohio, U.S.
- Died: August 30, 2002 (aged 75); Kennesaw, Georgia, U.S.
- Listed height: 5 ft 11 in (1.80 m)
- Listed weight: 217 lb (98 kg)

Career information
- High school: Van Wert
- College: Ohio State (1945–1949)
- NFL draft: 1949: 21st round, 202nd overall pick

Career history
- Detroit Lions (1950–1951)

Awards and highlights
- Third-team All-American (1949); First-team All-Big Nine (1949)

Career NFL statistics
- Games played: 24
- Games started: 15
- Interceptions: 3
- Stats at Pro Football Reference

Raymond Jack Lininger (June 27, 1927 – August 30, 2002) was an American professional football linebacker who played two seasons with the Detroit Lions of the National Football League (NFL). He was selected by the Lions in the 21st round of the 1949 NFL draft after playing college football at Ohio State University.

== Early life ==
Raymond Jack Lininger was born on June 27, 1927, in Van Wert, Ohio. He attended Van Wert High School in Van Wert.

== College career ==
Lininger played college football for the Ohio State Buckeyes of Ohio State University. He was a starting center on offense and a starting linebacker on defense. He was a letterman in 1945. Lininger missed the 1946 season due to service in the Army Corps of Engineers. He was then a three-year letterman at Ohio State from 1947 to 1949. As a senior in 1949, Lininger earned Associated Press (AP) third-team All-American and AP first-team All-Big Nine honors. He was inducted into the Ohio State athletics hall of fame in 2003.

== Professional career ==
Lininger was selected by the Detroit Lions in the 21st round, with the 202nd overall pick, of the 1949 NFL draft. He signed with the Lions on May 9, 1950. He started all 12 games during his rookie year in 1950 and recorded three interceptions. Lininger appeared in all 12 games, starting three, during the 1951 season. He became a free agent after the season.

== Personal life ==
Lininger served in the United States Army. He died on August 30, 2002, in Kennesaw, Georgia.
