= Nick Sebek =

American football player (1927–2007)

No. 42
- Position: Quarterback

Personal information
- Born: October 11, 1927; Niagara Falls, New York, U.S.
- Died: November 27, 2007 (aged 80); Buffalo, New York, U.S.
- Listed height: 6 ft 1 in (1.85 m)
- Listed weight: 194 lb (88 kg)

Career information
- High school: North Tonawanda (North Tonawanda, New York)
- College: Indiana
- NFL draft: 1949: 25th round, 248th overall pick

Career history
- Washington Redskins (1950)

Career NFL statistics
- Passing yards: 0
- TD–INT: 0-2
- Stats at Pro Football Reference

Nicholas Sebek (October 11, 1927 – November 27, 2007) was an American professional football player who was a quarterback in the National Football League (NFL) for the Washington Redskins. He played college football for the Indiana Hoosiers and was selected in the 25th round of the 1949 NFL draft.
