= Johnny Karras =

American football player (1928–2008)

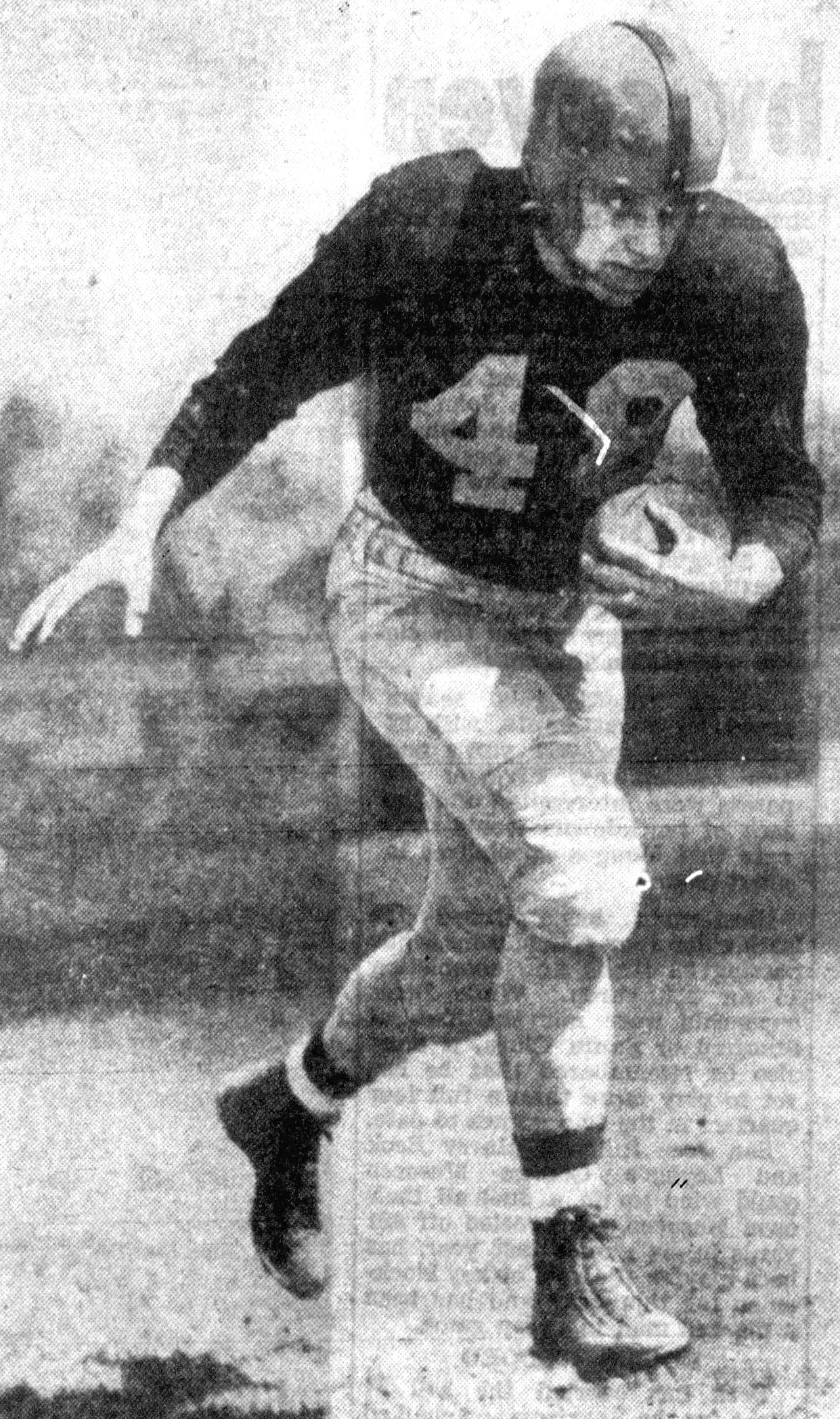
- Karras, circa 1950

No. 44
- Position: Halfback

Personal information
- Born: January 29, 1928; Chicago, Illinois, U.S.
- Died: November 6, 2008 (aged 80); Hinsdale, Illinois, U.S.
- Listed height: 5 ft 11 in (1.80 m)
- Listed weight: 187 lb (85 kg)

Career information
- High school: Argo (Summit, Illinois)
- College: Illinois
- NFL draft: 1952: 2nd round, 16th overall pick

Career history
- Chicago Cardinals (1952)

Awards and highlights
- Consensus All-American (1951); Third-team All-American (1949); 2× First-team All-Big Ten (1949, 1951); Second-team All-Big Ten (1950)

Career NFL statistics
- Rushing yards: 42
- Rushing average: 1.8
- Receptions: 5
- Receiving yards: 63
- Total touchdowns: 1
- Stats at Pro Football Reference

John J. "Argo Express" Karras (January 29, 1928 – November 6, 2008) was an American professional football halfback who played one season with the Chicago Cardinals of the National Football League (NFL). He was selected by the Cardinals in the second round of the 1952 NFL draft. Karras had previously played college football at the University of Illinois at Urbana–Champaign and attended Argo Community High School in Summit, Illinois. He was a consensus All-American in 1951.

== College career ==
Karras first enrolled at the University of Illinois as a freshman in 1946 and then spent 18 months in the United States Army holding the rank of private first class. He returned to Illinois in 1949, accumulating seven rushing touchdowns and 826 yards rushing. He led the Illinois Fighting Illini football team in rushing yards in 1950 and 1951. Karras was a consensus All-American in 1951 after gaining 716 yards rushing and scoring 13 touchdowns. Illinois went 16–3–1 and won the 1952 Rose Bowl against Stanford. In 1990, he was named to Illinois' All-Century team.

== Professional career ==
Karras was selected by the Chicago Cardinals with the sixteenth pick in the 1952 NFL draft. He played in ten games and scored one receiving touchdown in 1952.
