= Leo Koceski =

American football player (1929–2021)

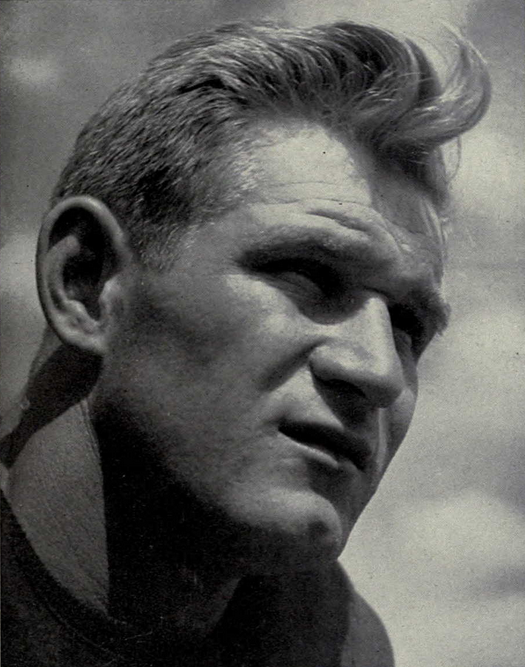
- Leo Koceski in 1948

Michigan Wolverines
- Position: Halfback

Personal information
- Born: January 28, 1929; Canonsburg, Pennsylvania, U.S.
- Died: September 21, 2021 (aged 92); Dearborn Heights, Michigan, U.S.

Career information
- College: Michigan

Awards and highlights
- National champion (1948); Pennsylvania Sports Hall of Fame

Leo Robert "Bugsy" Koceski Jr. (January 28, 1929 – September 21, 2021), also known as the "Canonsburg Comet," was an American football halfback. He played for Michigan's undefeated national championship team in 1948 and the 1950 Big Ten championship team that defeated the California in the 1951 Rose Bowl.

== Early life ==
Koceski was born in 1929, the youngest of nine children. His father, Leo Robert Koceski, Sr., died in 1938 when Koceski was 11 years old. Koceski began his football career at Canonsburg High School in Canonsburg, Pennsylvania. He played football at Canonsburg from 1943 to 1946, was selected as an All-WPIAL player in both 1945 and 1946, and led the WPIAL in scoring as a senior in 1946. Koceski scored 19 touchdowns in 1946 and was also a sprinter and long jumper for Canonsburg's track team.

== University of Michigan ==
Koceski was recruited as a football player by Pitt, Penn State, Army, Navy, Notre Dame, Alabama, Tennessee, and Columbia, but he chose the University of Michigan. In a 1948 interview, Koceski explained his selection of Michigan, "Ever since I was in the sixth grade at First Ward public school, I had wanted to go to Michigan. It seemed too good to be true when they accepted me." In 1947, he played on the freshman team coached by Wally Weber. Koceski joined the varsity team in 1948 and helped the Wolverines to an undefeated season and national championship. In Michigan's 28–0 victory over Northwestern in 1948, Koceski scored three touchdowns. Michigan's fourth touchdown in the Northwestern game resulted from a Koceski fumble as he crossed the goal line, with the ball being recovered in the end zone by teammate Bob Erben. Following the Northwestern game, the Associated Press wrote:

"Koceski carried the ball only six times for 20 yards, a running figure exceeded by both Ortmann and End Dick Rifenburg, but the little right halfback who stepped into the man-sized shoes of the departed Bump Elliott and fills 'em like they were made for him caught three passes for 40 yards more."

After his performance against Northwestern, the Los Angeles Times called Koceski "a sawed-off 163 pound squirt from Canonsburg, Pa." Koceski also helped the 1948 Wolverines maintain their undefeated record by catching a pass at midfield against Minnesota and running for a touchdown on a play that covered 64 yards.

In 1949, Koceski scored two touchdowns in an early game against Stanford, as the Wolverines extended their winning streak to 25 games. He was the Wolverines' leading ground gainer until he suffered a cracked rib in a practice scrimmage in mid-October. In 1949, a Detroit newspaper reported that Koceski and Chuck Ortmann were being investigated by former FBI agents hired by the Big Ten Conference to determine whether the two were actually performing services for a company that employed them. A report by the investigators concluded that Ortmann and Koceski were actually performing work, "not just punching a time clock." In early December 1949, athletic director Fritz Crisler announced that the two players had been given a clean slate: "There was no question of reinstatement of the players. They were never in a position for such a thing as reinstatement to arise."

Koceski continued to suffer from injuries during the 1950 football season and was able to start only four games. In the third game of the season against Army, Koceski suffered pulled knee ligaments and was out of action for several games. Koceski returned to the lineup in time for the Ohio State game—the infamous Snow Bowl game of 1950. Late in the game, Koceski entered the game from the sidelines with the news that Northwestern had upset Illinois, which meant that Michigan would be the Big Ten champion and advance to the Rose Bowl with a victory over Ohio State. With the wind blowing at 28 miles per hour in a blizzard, Koceski recalled the conditions at the Snow Bowl as follows: "It was cold, it was nasty, and it wasn't any fun." The Wolverines won the Snow Bowl by a score of 9 to 3 and advanced to the 1951 Rose Bowl.

In the weeks leading up to the Rose Bowl, Koceski's knee became the subject of extensive coverage in the press. On Christmas Eve, the Los Angeles Times reported that Coach Bennie Oosterbaan's hopes for Koceski faded when Koceski complained of a "'very tired' feeling in his gimpy right knee and was excused early in the forenoon workout." Two days, later the Times reported that "Michigan Hopes Soar" on news that Koceski was "looking better." Two days before the Rose Bowl game, Oosterbaan told the press that Koceski was in his best shape since the Army game. Oosterbaan said, "Leo will play both on offense and defense. How effectively I cannot say, but he will play." Koceski's final game for the Michigan team was the 1951 Rose Bowl victory over California. After the game, Coach Oosterbaan cited Koceski as one of the standouts of the game for Michigan along with Don Dufek, Al "Brick" Wahl, and Chuck Ortmann.

Koceski also played baseball for the Michigan Wolverines baseball teams that won two Big 10 championships. He was an outfielder who was elected team captain in 1951.

== Later life and death ==
Koceski worked as a sales representative for Wilsonart Co. in Michigan. He was married and had three sons. In 1989, he was inducted into the Pennsylvania Sports Hall of Fame.

Koceski lived in Dearborn Heights, Michigan, where he died on September 21, 2021, at the age of 92.
