= 1948 Oregon State Beavers football team =

American college football season

1948 Oregon State Beavers football
- Head coach Lon Stiner

Pineapple Bowl, W 47–27 vs. Hawaii
- Conference: Pacific Coast Conference
- Record: 5–4–3 (2–3–2 PCC)
- Head coach: Lon Stiner (14th season)
- Home stadium: Bell Field; Multnomah Stadium

1948 Pacific Coast Conference football standings
	Conf.					Overall
Team	W		L		T	W		L		T
No. 4 California ^ +	6	–	0	–	0	10	–	1	–	0
No. 9 Oregon +	7	–	0	–	0	9	–	2	–	0
USC	4	–	2	–	0	6	–	3	–	1
Washington State	4	–	3	–	1	4	–	5	–	1
Stanford	3	–	4	–	0	4	–	6	–	0
Oregon State	2	–	3	–	2	5	–	4	–	3
Washington	2	–	5	–	1	2	–	7	–	1
UCLA	2	–	6	–	0	3	–	7	–	0
Idaho	1	–	5	–	0	3	–	6	–	0
Montana	0	–	3	–	0	3	–	7	–	0
+ – Conference co-champions; ^ – Selected as Rose Bowl representative; Rankings from AP Poll

The 1948 Oregon State Beavers football team represented Oregon State College in the Pacific Coast Conference (PCC) during the 1948 college football season. In their fourteenth season under head coach Lon Stiner, the Beavers compiled a 5–4–3 record (2–3–2 in PCC, sixth) and outscored their opponents 249 to 236.

Oregon State was ranked at No. 54 in the final Litkenhous Difference by Score System ratings for 1948.

The team played its home games on campus at Bell Field in Corvallis and at Multnomah Stadium in Portland. The Beavers were invited to participate in the 1949 Pineapple Bowl on New Year's Day, where they defeated the home team from the University of Hawaii by a score of 47–27.

== Schedule ==
Date	Opponent	Site	Result	Attendance	Source
September 18	Idaho	Bell Field; Corvallis, OR	W 27–12	8,400	
September 24	at USC	Los Angeles Memorial Coliseum; Los Angeles, CA	L 6–21	50,237	
October 2	Washington	Multnomah Stadium; Portland, OR	T 14–14	25,000	
October 9	Portland*	Bell Field; Corvallis, OR	W 26–3	6,500	
October 16	at No. 6 California	California Memorial Stadium; Berkeley, CA	L 0–42	55,000	
October 23	at UCLA	Los Angeles Memorial Coliseum; Los Angeles, CA	W 28–0	30,933	
October 30	No. 17 Michigan State*	Bell Field; Corvallis, OR	L 21–46	12,000	
November 6	at Washington State	Rogers Field; Pullman, WA	T 26–26	12,000	
November 13	Utah*	Bell Field; Corvallis, OR	T 20–20	8,000	
November 20	No. 13 Oregon	Bell Field; Corvallis, OR	L 0–10	22,000	
November 27	Nebraska*	Multnomah Stadium; Portland, OR	W 28–12	13,000	
January 1, 1949	at Hawaii*	Honolulu Stadium; Honolulu, Territory of Hawaii (Pineapple Bowl)	W 47–27	14,000	
*Non-conference game; Rankings from AP Poll released prior to the game

== Background ==
The 1947 season had been a bitter one for fans of the Oregon State College Beavers, a significant power in the ten team Pacific Coast Intercollegiate Athletic Conference (PCC). A close second-place finish to UCLA in 1946 had given way to a 3–4 conference record and a sixth place finish for the Orangemen of coach Lon Stiner, dean of the conference's coaches.

Even worse, another year of mediocrity appeared to be in the offing, with national football journalist Paul Zimmerman projecting the Beavers for a fifth place finish in 1948, with only "an outside chance of...figuring in the final reckoning." The 1948 edition of national preview magazine Illustrated Football Annual noted that "graduation took a thick slick out of the Orange line" of the middling 1947 squad, leaving "unsung reserves, plus a sprinkling of precocious sophs" to "plug some cavernous gaps if Lon Stiner's big boys are to plunk their outsize feet in the middle of the pie."

In short, another disappointing middle-of-the-pack finish was anticipated going into the season, the 14th of Lon Stiner's OSC coaching career.

== Preseason ==
=== Spring practice ===
Spring practice for Oregon State opened in earnest in Corvallis on Friday, April 30, when two intersquad teams ran onto the grass at Bell Field. The "Orange squad", dominated by upperclassmen, dominated the sophomore-laden "White squad" by a score of 20 to 0, with the Orange backfield consisting of single-wing left halfback Dick Gray, right halfback Don Samuel, and fullback Dick Twenge proving too much for the younger players to handle.

Portland's Dick Gray was the third of three brothers to play halfback for OSC.

A second spring scrimmage game was held May 7, with the domination of the older lettermen only amplified, with the Orange this time winning by a one-sided score of 33–0. In a contest held in the pounding rain, left half Dick Gray was again the star, spinning a 15-yard touchdown to quarterback Rudy Ruppe and racing 42-yards for another in an intrasquad game that was never close.

The final intrasquad game, held at Bell Field on May 14, offered the best showing by the OSC varsity's white-clad newcomers, with the sophomores threatening an upset before ultimately falling to former Portland Roosevelt High School star Dick Gray and the Orange team, 27–13. Gray was said to have offered "an excellent exhibition of passing and running" in leading the upperclassmen to their third straight victory. Dick was the third Gray brother to play halfback for OSC, following in the footsteps of his older brothers Joe (from 1936) and Al (from 1941).

With a lack of leadership believed to be the chief failing of the 1947 team, Portland Oregonian sports editor L.H. Gregory touted halfback Gray as a key piece of the 1948 equation. The performance and leadership of Gray — a somewhat fragile player who had already undergone meniscus operations to both knees — was believed to be a key element of the team in 1948. "What he did this spring practice held the key to the fall Oregon State football outlook," Gregory wrote.

Gray had been the star in a 1947 Beaver victory over Nebraska, throwing three touchdown passes in the effort, and appeared poised to go off as a legitimate star. One unnamed Corvallis observer gushed that Gray had done "about everything" in spring practice: "called signals, passed, run, punted, and showed great form on defense." The observer added that Gray "throws passes two ways, hard and soft, with full accuracy" and that he was so athletic that he was able to high jump 5'6" in full football garb following a strenuous two-hour practice.

=== Fall practice ===
Coach Stiner opened up fall practice for the Orangemen the afternoon of Wednesday, September 1, with an optimistic projection of the team's chances in 1948. A total of 55 prospective players took the field to be led in a series of conditioning exercises and drills in passing and punting, concluding with a short scrimmage session.

Junior Ken Carpenter emerged as a star during fall practice. He would play four seasons for the Cleveland Browns and six more in Canada before finishing with the Denver Broncos of the AFL.

Stiner announced that he would be modifying his "deep wing" offense slightly in 1948 to make the quarterback more of an offensive weapon, he having previously used that position primarily as a blocking back for his halfback-centric offensive attack. After four days of "daily double" practices to build conditioning, Stiner began to install new offensive plays for the September 18 season opener in Corvallis.

With the season opener against Idaho just over two weeks away, immediate attention was paid to rebuilding the line, which had suffered the loss of four of seven starters to graduation — the left tackle, left guard, right guard, and right end. Additionally, four reserve linemen were similarly lost to graduation, adding to the complexity of line coach Jim Dixon's restructuring task. Dixon took a look at 13 prospects coming from the ranks of last year's reserves, new sophomores, and transfers to the program trying to plug the massive gap.

Dixon ultimately solved the problem by converting two returning juniors, Tom DeSylvia and Ed Carmichael — the latter the second heaviest player on the team at 222 pounds — from tackle to guard, thereby plugging the center of his line with experienced players.

The thin line was offset by a bountiful backfield, judged by one sportswriter as "two and three deep for almost every backfield position. This included the critical left halfback position. Fall practice brought forward a new name — Ken Carpenter, a 6-foot, 185-pound junior from Seattle that was a triple threat of such a magnitude that the strong spring session of Dick Gray was all but forgotten. Going into the season Carpenter was being penned in as the starting left half, which Gray his substitute. Both would supply OSC with a one-two punch over the course of the coming year.

While the offense seemed promising as the season approached, misgivings began to be expressed about the defensive capabilities of OSC, with an Associated Press reporter near the team noting that Stiner had stared "bleakly" during defensive drills and to have later stated that everything was "bad", with the exception of pass defense, which was proclaimed "extra bad".

== Regular season ==
=== Week 1: Idaho Vandals ===
Southpaw Don Samuel starred against the Vandals. The right halfback was an effective passer rolling to his left.

A newly renovated Bell Field in Corvallis was the site for the season-opener between the Oregon State College Beavers and the Idaho Vandals, with a kickoff scheduled for 2 pm. The Vandals returned a nearly full complement of players from the 1947 squad that shocked West coast powerhouse Stanford by three points, and, while remaining underdogs on the road against OSC, were still reckoned to be among the strongest teams in school history.

The Beavers easily overmatched their guests, however, tearing apart Idaho with a passing attack led by southpaw halfback Don Samuel, a senior from Hood River. OSC backs combined to complete 16 passes on 22 attempts for 269 yards — regarded as exceptional both for accuracy and yardage for a team of this era with a history steeped in the running game.

The Beavers took the initiative from the opening kickoff, starting from their own 31 yard line and taking it to the Idaho 20 before bogging down. After stopping the Vandals and forcing them to punt, OSC began its second drive around midfield and marched in for the initial score with just over six minutes off the clock. The 6–0 score held until halftime.

In the third quarter, the Beavers and Vandals matched touchdowns, with Idaho finally breaking ice late in the period off an intercepted pass by Don Ditz. A touchdown run by Don Samuel and pass from Dick Gray to fullback Dick Twenge for seven more points broke the game open for the Orangemen in the final quarter. The Vandals managed a garbagetime touchdown with 30 seconds on the clock via an OSC fumble to reduce the margin of their defeat to 27–12.

Despite losing the turnover battle 5 to 2, the Beavers dominated Idaho in total offense, 445 yards to 177, forcing the Vandals to punt the ball 8 times.

The following Thursday, September 23, OSC was invited to provide the opposition to the University of Hawaii in their annual "Pineapple Bowl". Oregon State athletic director Roy "Spec" Keen was quick to accept the offer to play in the New Year's Day game in Honolulu, declaring that the Beavers were "happy to be invited." A final contract was said to be forthcoming shortly.

=== Week 2: at USC Trojans ===
Senior center Jim Swarbrick's bad snap set up the second USC touchdown in Oregon State's loss to the Trojans.

After a season opener in front of a small Corvallis crowd, the Beavers headed for Los Angeles to take on the reigning Pacific Coast Conference champion USC Trojans at Los Angeles Memorial Coliseum. The 8:30 pm game was not expected to be competitive, with gamblers having proclaimed the Trojans a 19-point favorite, with the Beavers a 4-to-1 underdog on the money line. A crowd of 40,000 was expected.

The final result proved to be no different than any of the preceding 19 trips by a Pacific Northwest team to face the Trojans or the Bruins at the Coliseum, with the home team taking a 14–6 lead to the locker room at halftime and never looking back.

The first USC score was set up by a miserable 17-yard out-of-bounds quick-kick punt by Don Samuel that started the Trojans out for their first series on the OSC 40-yard line. While the visitors managed to turn over the Trojans at the 4 on a fumble, the rough start was indicative of the way the evening would go for OSC.

After trading the ball again on the Beaver end of the field, the Trojans drove and scored on a 2-yard run by left halfback Don Doll with two minutes remaining in the first quarter. A second USC touchdown was added in the second quarter when Beaver center Jim Swarbrick hiked the ball 15 yards past everyone, with the Trojans recovering at the OSC 36-yard line. This set up a screen pass to USC reserve Jay Roundy on the next play, with the right halfback taking it to the house for a 14–0 lead. It seemed to the crowd of 50,237 that the rout was on.

But the Beavers hung tough. With time running out before halftime, Beaver halfbacks Ken Carpenter and Don Samuel began tag-teaming with runs and passes, with Carpenter hitting to Samuel with passes of 15 and 14 yards in marching the Orangemen down the field. An 8-yard sweep around left end by Samuel for a touchdown sealed the deal with 22 seconds on the clock. The point after touchdown was missed, however, leaving it a two score game at halftime, Trojans 14, Beavers 6.

The Beavers battled gamely through the second half, with back-to-back motion penalties derailing one drive and a clipping call short-circuiting another. After a scoreless third quarter, USC hit on a 44-yard touchdown pass to score a third and final touchdown with just 38 seconds remaining, sealing a 21–6 win for the men of Troy.

Quarterback Dean Dill starred for the Trojans, connecting on 11 of his 15 pass attempts in the USC victory. USC outgained Oregon State 356 yards to 249; each team suffered two turnovers.

=== Week 3: Washington Huskies ===
Quarterback Rudy Ruppe was largely a blocker and pass receiver out of the single-wing.

With OSC in the place it figured to be with a record of 1–1, preparations were made for the third contest of 1948 — the 35th meeting of the Beavers and the Washington Huskies. Oregon State came in confidently, victors over Washington in their last three meetings, and seven out of the last 10.

The 1948 Huskies featured a new head coach, the 37-year old Howie Odell, a staunch advocate of the T formation following a 1944 conversion from the single-wing when he was head coach at Yale. One of the youngest head coaches at major universities, Odell was an advocate of exhaustive film study as a key component of game preparation.

Anticipating a large crowd, the game was scheduled for Multnomah Stadium in Portland, a more spacious venue than little Bell Field in Corvallis. Both teams arrived in the city on the Friday before the game — the Beavers by bus in the afternoon and the Huskies aboard a United Airlines flight in the early evening. Clear weather and a temperature of 73 degrees was projected for the game's 2 pm start.

Cover of the program for the Beavers' October 23 game at UCLA.

Program for the Beavers' October 30 home game with Michigan State.

Program cover for the October 23 game at Washington State.

Program for the Beavers' November 27 game against Nebraska, held in Portland.

== Aftermath ==
The strong season of the arch-rival University of Oregon, who finished an undefeated 7–0 in conference and 9–2 with a #9 ranking in the final Associated Press coaches' poll, accentuated the general feeling of malaise in Corvallis. The Beavers' bowl appearance was no great achievement, a scheduled game agreed to by the athletic director after just one week of the season. The 1948 season would prove to be the last for 45-year old Oregon State head coach Stiner.

On March 7, 1949, Lon Stiner resigned his position with the Beaver football team. He said at the time, "A football coach must have full support in his job. I have had excellent support in the past but when the full support no longer exists, a change is for the best for all parties concerned." With 16 years of service, he was the dean of the PCC football coaches. He concluded his head coaching stint at OSC with a record of 74–49–17 — although just 49–42–13 against Pacific Coast Conference opponents.

== Coaching staff ==
Line coach Jim Dixon, namesake of Dixon Recreation Center.

During the 1948 season, Lon Stiner made use of three assistant coaches. As the team essentially playing its starting eleven in a single-platoon manner, OSC's coaches taught both offensive and defensive principles.

- Jim Dixon, line
- Bob Dethman, backs
- Lee Gustafson, backs

The school also employed two coaches to run its junior varsity football program:

- Al Cox, freshmen
- Jack Begelman, freshman

== Roster ==
Quarterbacks
• 26 - Don Mast (Junior)
• 34 - Rudy Ruppe (Junior) *
• 38 - Cliff Snider (Sophomore)
• 43 - Garth Rouse (Junior)

Halfbacks
• 11 - Ronald Newton (Sophomore)
• 22 - Walt Kelly (Sophomore)
• 24 - Don Ditz (Junior)
• 25 - Dick Gray (Junior) *
• 29 - Duke Byers (Sophomore)
• 42 - Bob Laidlaw (Junior)
• 46 - Ken Carpenter (Junior) †
• 57 - Dick Vaillancour (Junior)
• 66 - Don Samuel (Senior) *

Fullbacks
• 33 - Andy Knudsen (Junior) *
• 36 - Dick Twenge (Junior)
• 49 - Duane Moore (Junior)

Ends
• 81 - Bud Gibbs (Junior) *
• 82 - Bob Grove (Senior)
• 83 - Dick Lorenz (Senior) *
• 84 - Don Nibblett (Sophomore)
• 85 - Stan McGuire (Sophomore)
• 86 - Craig McMicken (Junior)
• 87 - Dave Oliver (Sophomore)
• 88 - Harry Barnes (Junior)

Tackles
• 55 - Hal Hermansen (Sophomore)
• 69 - Al Abraham (Sophomore)
• 70 - Bill McGee (Junior)
• 72 - Jay Simon (Junior)
• 73 - Bill Austin (Senior) * †
• 75 - Jim Conroy (Junior)
• 76 - Jim Inglesby (Junior)
• 77 - Ray Zielinski (Sophomore)
• 78 - Ralph Davis (Senior)
• 79 - Arvid Niemi (Sophomore) *

Guards
• 41 - Bill Peden (Sophomore)
• 48 - Jim Clements (Junior)
• 61 - Ray Koch (Junior)
• 62 - Bill Marsters (Sophomore)
• 64 - Jim Hanker (Sophomore)
• 65 - Bud Cahill (Sophomore)
• 68 - Ron McReary (Junior)
• 71 - Ed Carmichael (Junior) * †
• 74 - Tom DeSylvia (Junior) * †
• 89 - Bruce Ecklund (Sophomore)

Centers
• 53 - Bob Krell (Senior)
• 54 - Jim Swarbrick (Senior) *
• 56 - Bill Overman (Junior)
• 58 - Al Gray (Junior)
• 63 - Jim English (Junior)

Kickers
• Stan McGuire

Punter
• XX - NNNNNNNNN

Projected opening day starters marked with *
Eventual NFL or AAFC draft pick marked with †
Source: Oregon State vs. University of Washington, October 2, 1948, Multnomah Stadium; pp. 13–14.
