= Oregon–Washington football rivalry =

American college football rivalry

- Oregon Ducks Washington Huskies
- First meeting: December 1, 1900; Oregon, 43–0
- Latest meeting: November 29, 2025; Oregon, 26–14
- Next meeting: November 28, 2026
- Stadiums: Autzen Stadium; Husky Stadium

Statistics
- Total meetings: 118
- All-time series: Washington leads, 63–50–5 (.555)
- Largest victory: Oregon: 58–0 (1973); Washington: 66–0 (1974)
- Longest win streak: Oregon: 12 (2004–2015)
- Current win streak: Oregon: 2 (2024–present)

Location of campuses in the Northwest

The Oregon–Washington football rivalry is an American college football rivalry between the Washington Huskies and Oregon Ducks of the Big Ten Conference. Previously they both played in the legacy Pac-12 Conference and were opponents in its final Pac-12 Championship Game. Their respective campuses in Seattle and Eugene are 285 miles (460 km) apart, via Interstate 5. Washington leads the series 63–50–5 as of 2024.

It is one of the 25 most played rivalries in NCAA Division I FBS history, and has been played regularly since 1900. Since 1922, the two teams have met on the field in every year except 1943, 1944, 2001, and 2020. In two years, 1945 and 2023, this rivalry game occurred twice in the same year, with Washington winning both games in those seasons. Like many rivalry games, the game is played during the final week of the college football season.

The programs of this rivalry have recently played in one College Football Playoff National Championship game each, with Oregon contesting the 2015 NCAA Championship Game and Washington contesting the 2024 NCAA Championship Game. In those games they lost to future Big Ten stablemates Ohio State and Michigan, respectively, the latter of which Washington coincidentally defeated for its 1991 National Championship. (Note: There were two national champions that year, as Washington finished ranked No. 1 in the Coaches poll while Miami (Fla.) was No. 1 in the AP poll.)

== Series history ==
=== Early years ===
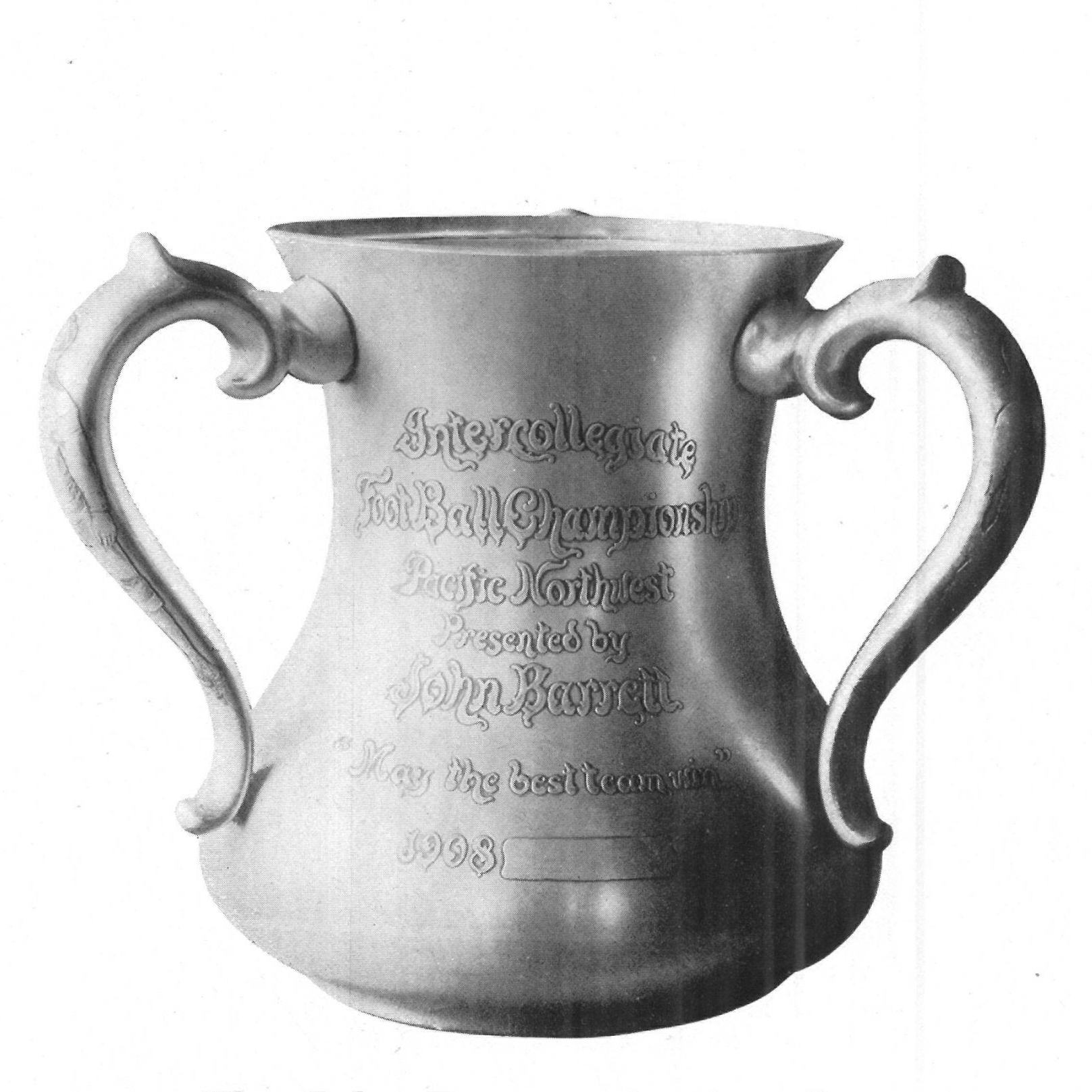
The 1909 Washington–Oregon game decided the Northwest Conference championship and ownership of the John Barrett Cup, with Washington winning 20–6.

The series opened in 1900, with Oregon dominating Washington 43–0 in Eugene.

==== Northwest Conference ====
In 1909 the teams met in Seattle on Thanksgiving Day for the final game of the season, with both teams undefeated in Northwest Conference league play. The game decided the Northwest intercollegiate championship and ownership of the Tiffany & Co. silver loving cup awarded by John Barrett. Washington won the Northwest championship 20–6 due largely to their use of the still-new forward pass while Oregon played an older style of football.

In 1911 Dobie successfully ran his "Bunk Play", a hidden ball trick in which Washington quarterback "Wee" Coyle removed his leather headgear and held it to his chest to simulate the football.

==== Pacific Coast Conference ====
The rivalry became heated from Oregon's perspective in 1948, when Oregon and California both went undefeated in the Pacific Coast Conference. California was undefeated overall, and Oregon's only loss was at undefeated Michigan, that year's national champions. The Ducks had seven victories in the PCC to Cal's six. The winner of the PCC, as was the case for most of the Pac-12's history, played in the Rose Bowl. Oregon, led by quarterback Norm Van Brocklin and halfback John McKay, opted for a playoff game, but California declined. The tiebreaker format the PCC elected to use was that the championship team be elected by the schools. The PCC had ten member schools in 1948, six in the Northwest (with Idaho and Montana) and four in California, so it was assumed that Oregon would be the team playing in the Rose Bowl, as even a 5–5 tie vote would be in their favor. Instead California was voted champion of the PCC, because Washington had persuaded Montana to vote for California, something that has not been forgotten by Oregon fans.

The PCC allowed a second bowl team that season and Oregon went to the 1949 Cotton Bowl Classic, but lost 21–13 to Southern Methodist. California lost to Northwestern, 20–14, in the Rose Bowl.

=== 1950s and 1960s ===
All-Pacific Coast Conference fullback Hugh McElhenny and the Huskies ran up the score on Oregon, 63–6 in 1951 in what was at the time the most lopsided score of the series.

In 1962, Larry Hill of Oregon was tackled by Washington fans who had rushed onto the field at Husky Stadium while he was trying to catch the tie-breaking touchdown on the game's final play.

=== 1970s and 1980s ===
In 1973, the Ducks exceeded the 57 point loss margin that the Huskies had inflicted on them back in 1951 with a 58–0 shutout in Eugene. The following season, the Huskies more than returned the favor, shutting out the Ducks 66–0 in Seattle. This remains the largest margin of victory in this series to date.

From 1974 through 1986, the Huskies won 12 of 13 games against the Ducks.

=== 1990s and later ===
In 1995, Washington head coach Jim Lambright unsuccessfully lobbied for the Huskies to be selected to play in the Cotton Bowl instead of the Ducks. Seattle Post Intelligencer columnist Bud Withers wrote that Lambright's actions "invited at least another half-century worth of bile from Oregon fans."

After winning four of six over Lambright in the 1990s, the rivalry was given another boost in Oregon eyes when Colorado head coach Rick Neuheisel moved to Washington in 1999. At the 1996 Cotton Bowl between #12 Oregon and #7 Colorado, Neuheisel called for a fake punt while the Buffaloes led 32–6 with less than five minutes left. Oregon coach Mike Bellotti was also accused of turning Neuheisel in for recruiting during the dead period. The Ducks were 1–2 against the Huskies under Neuheisel, and the rivalry grew even more when Neuheisel celebrated by taking photos and jumping up and down on the "O" in the middle of the field after a win at Autzen Stadium in 2002. Two years earlier, the Ducks' victory in 2000 in Eugene spoiled an otherwise undefeated season for the Huskies, who won the Rose Bowl and finished third in the nation. Due to Pac-10 scheduling, the teams did not meet in 2001, the first break in the rivalry since the hiatus in 1943 and 1944 due to World War II.

Through 2023, Washington leads 63–48–5 (.565). The Huskies went 18–4 from 1972 to 1993 (mostly under Don James, 15–3), but Oregon then went 17–4 from 1994 through 2015. The Ducks won 12 straight from 2004 to 2015, the longest run by either team in the series; the closest margin was six points (26–20) in 2015. It ended in 2016 when the fifth-ranked Huskies won 70–21 in Eugene, a game that set series scoring records for one team (70 points) and both teams (91). Washington followed it up with a 38–3 home win in 2017. Oregon ended their 2-game losing streak in the series in 2018 with a 30–27 overtime win over Washington in Eugene, the first overtime game in the rivalry's history. In the 2019 rendition in Seattle, the Ducks came back from a 14-point deficit in the 2nd half to prevail 35–31 over the Huskies. It was the 2nd consecutive meeting in which both teams were ranked, and 7th all-time. The 2020 game was canceled due to increasing COVID-19 cases in the Washington football program.

==== Notable events after 1990 ====
===== "The Pick" =====
Arguably the most iconic moment in the history of the rivalry for Ducks fans happened in 1994, when Oregon freshman cornerback Kenny Wheaton intercepted Washington quarterback Damon Huard and returned the ball 97 yards for a touchdown with under a minute to play to seal a 31–20 upset win that snapped a five-game losing streak in the series for the Ducks and set them on course for what would become their first conference championship (and trip to the Rose Bowl) since 1957. This play, coined "The Pick", is widely credited as the turning point for the Oregon football program on their way to becoming nationally relevant in the decades that followed. It also swung momentum in the rivalry that was until then mostly dominated by the Huskies, 54–28–5, with Oregon notching a 17–4 record against Washington from The Pick until the end of The Streak. Just before kickoff of every Ducks home game, a replay of "The Pick" is shown on the Autzen Stadium video board, always accompanied by a loud and gleeful reaction.

===== "The Streak" =====
Oregon beat Washington in 12 straight games from 2004–2015, the longest winning streak in the rivalry.

This streak correlated with Oregon's most successful era of football and Washington's least. The Ducks went 120–36 (.769) over these 12 seasons, with two national championship game appearances, four conference titles, two Rose Bowl victories, and a Heisman Trophy winner. Meanwhile, the Huskies went 62–88 (.413) including a winless 0–12 in 2008.

===== "The Point" and 70 point victory =====
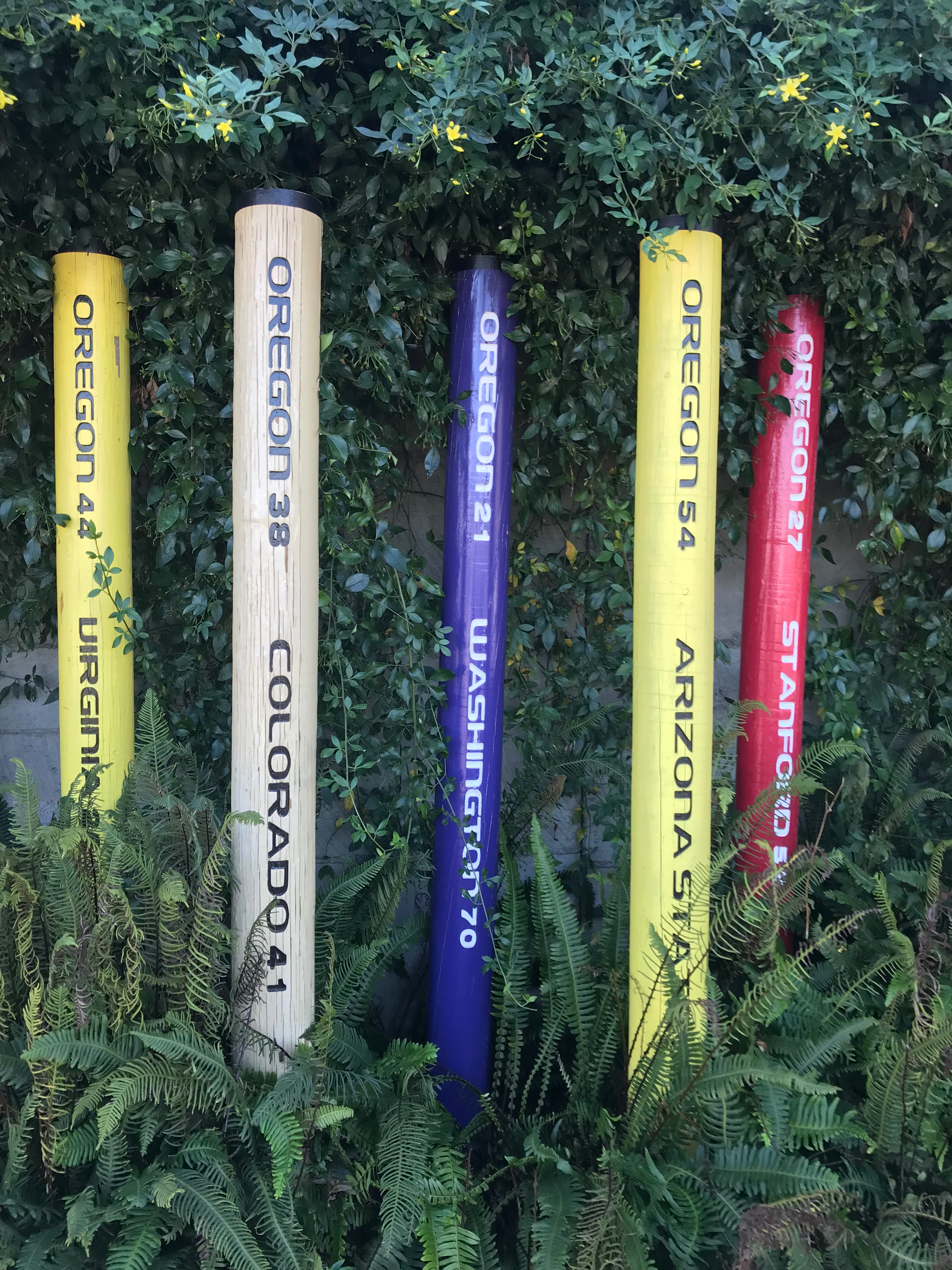
Score stick at Autzen Stadium commemorating Washington's 2016 70-point victory.

The Huskies finally snapped their losing streak in 2016 with a dominating 70–21 win over the Ducks in Eugene. This was the first time an opponent had scored 70 points in Autzen Stadium's history, and the first time an Oregon team had allowed 70 points or more in a game since a 71–7 loss to the Texas Longhorns in 1941. The 2016 Huskies would go on to finish the regular season 12–1, win the Pac-12 Championship, and face Alabama in the CFP semifinal Peach Bowl. Their win vs. Oregon was seen as a major realignment in the power ranking of the Pac-12 North. In contrast to the Huskies, Oregon would go on to finish the season 4-8, resulting in head coach Mark Helfrich being fired at the end of the season.

On the game's first play from scrimmage, Ducks quarterback Justin Herbert, making his first college start, was intercepted by Huskies cornerback Budda Baker. Four plays later, QB Jake Browning scored the first of the Huskies' ten touchdowns on a 1-yard run. As he crossed the goal line Browning pointed his left index finger at trailing linebacker Jimmie Swain, who was clad in a throwback blue and yellow Oregon Webfoots jersey. This gesture became known as "The Point" after sideline photographs of the play went viral across social media during and after the game.

===== 2023: Top 10, Top 5, and the last Pac-12 crown =====
====== First ever Top 10 matchup ======
The 2023 matchup between AP No. 7 Washington and No. 8 Oregon was the first ever where both teams were ranked within the top ten of the AP Poll. In front of a sold out Husky Stadium, Washington defeated Oregon 36–33 in what was immediately considered one of the greatest games in the history of the rivalry. Despite having stopped two red zone fourth down conversion attempts by Oregon, Washington trailed by four with two minutes remaining in the fourth quarter. After Oregon failed to convert another fourth down to end the game, Washington's quarterback Michael Penix Jr. connected with receiver Rome Odunze for a game-winning touchdown after a drive spanning just two plays. With four seconds on the clock and one timeout remaining, Oregon kicker Camden Lewis missed a 43 yard field goal attempt, giving the Huskies the three-point win.

====== Final Pac-12 Championship and first Top 5 matchup ======
The 2023 Pac-12 Football Championship Game, the last before the collapse of the traditional Pac-12 Conference as a result of the 2021–2024 NCAA conference realignment, was a seasonal rematch between No. 3 Washington (12–0) and No. 5 Oregon (11–1). Oregon's sole loss had been the earlier road defeat to Washington, and they had looked dominant in the second half of the season. Washington, while remaining undefeated, had won all its games by ten points or fewer throughout October and November. The Ducks thus entered this December 1st game as the betting favorite. Adding even more suspense to this final Pac-12 Championship played between two rivals, it was widely predicted before the game that the winner would go to the four-team College Football Playoff. Washington's offense caught the Ducks by surprise early in the game, jumping out to a 20–3 lead, before the Ducks, led by quarterback Bo Nix, responded with 21 straight points. After a series of turnovers, the momentum swung back in the Huskies' favor. Washington came back to score two touchdowns in the fourth quarter to win the game 34–31 after a key first down by running back Dillon Johnson allowed them to run out the clock. Michael Penix Jr. received the Pac-12 Championship MVP.

This was the first and last Pac-12 Football Championship Game to be played between the rivals.

== Game results ==
Oregon victories	Washington victories	Tie games

No.	Date	Location	Winning team		Losing team	
1	December 1, 1900	Eugene, OR	Oregon	43	Washington	0
2	November 14, 1903	Seattle, WA	Washington	6	Oregon	5
3	November 12, 1904	Eugene, OR	Oregon	18	Washington	0
4	November 18, 1905	Eugene, OR	Tie	12	Tie	12
5	November 20, 1906	Eugene, OR	Oregon	16	Washington	6
6	November 16, 1907	Seattle, WA	Oregon	6	Washington	0
7	November 14, 1908	Eugene, OR	Washington	15	Oregon	0
8	November 25, 1909	Seattle, WA	Washington	20	Oregon	6
9	November 18, 1911	Portland, OR	Washington	29	Oregon	3
10	November 16, 1912	Seattle, WA	Washington	30	Oregon	14
11	November 15, 1913	Portland, OR	Washington	10	Oregon	7
12	November 14, 1914	Seattle, WA	Washington	10	Oregon	0
13	November 4, 1916	Eugene, OR	Tie	0	Tie	0
14	November 30, 1918	Eugene, OR	Oregon	7	Washington	0
15	November 1, 1919	Seattle, WA	Oregon	24	Washington	13
16	November 13, 1920	Eugene, OR	Oregon	17	Washington	0
17	November 30, 1922	Seattle, WA	Tie	3	Tie	3
18	December 1, 1923	Seattle, WA	Washington	26	Oregon	7
19	November 1, 1924	Eugene, OR	Oregon	7	Washington	3
20	November 26, 1925	Seattle, WA	Washington	15	Oregon	14
21	October 9, 1926	Portland, OR	Washington	23	Oregon	9
22	November 24, 1927	Seattle, WA	Washington	7	Oregon	0
23	October 20, 1928	Portland, OR	Oregon	27	Washington	0
24	October 26, 1929	Seattle, WA	Oregon	14	Washington	0
25	October 18, 1930	Portland, OR	Oregon	7	Washington	0
26	October 10, 1931	Seattle, WA	Oregon	13	Washington	0
27	October 8, 1932	Portland, OR	Tie	0	Tie	0
28	October 14, 1933	Seattle, WA	Oregon	6	Washington	0
29	October 13, 1934	Portland, OR	Washington	16	Oregon	6
30	November 23, 1935	Seattle, WA	Oregon	7	Washington	6
31	October 31, 1936	Portland, OR	#4 Washington	7	Oregon	0
32	November 20, 1937	Seattle, WA	Washington	14	Oregon	0
33	November 19, 1938	Portland, OR	Oregon	3	Washington	0
34	November 25, 1939	Seattle, WA	Washington	20	Oregon	13
35	October 12, 1940	Portland, OR	Washington	10	Oregon	0
36	November 22, 1941	Seattle, WA	Oregon	19	#20 Washington	16
37	October 10, 1942	Portland, OR	Washington	15	Oregon	7
38	September 29, 1945	Seattle, WA	Washington	20	Oregon	6
39	November 3, 1945	Portland, OR	#18 Washington	7	Oregon	0
40	November 16, 1946	Seattle, WA	Washington	16	Oregon	0
41	October 18, 1947	Portland, OR	Oregon	6	Washington	0
42	November 6, 1948	Seattle, WA	#16 Oregon	13	Washington	7
43	November 5, 1949	Portland, OR	Washington	28	Oregon	7
44	November 11, 1950	Seattle, WA	#17 Washington	27	Oregon	13
45	October 13, 1951	Portland, OR	Washington	63	Oregon	6
46	October 18, 1952	Seattle, WA	Washington	49	Oregon	0
47	October 17, 1953	Portland, OR	Washington	14	Oregon	6
48	October 30, 1954	Seattle, WA	Oregon	26	Washington	7
49	October 1, 1955	Portland, OR	#19 Washington	19	Oregon	7
50	October 13, 1956	Seattle, WA	Washington	20	Oregon	7
51	November 9, 1957	Portland, OR	Washington	13	Oregon	6
52	November 1, 1958	Seattle, WA	Washington	6	Oregon	0
53	October 24, 1959	Portland, OR	Washington	13	#11 Oregon	12
54	October 29, 1960	Seattle, WA	#9 Washington	7	Oregon	6
55	October 28, 1961	Portland, OR	Oregon	7	Washington	6
56	October 27, 1962	Seattle, WA	Tie	21	Tie	21
57	October 26, 1963	Portland, OR	Washington	26	Oregon	19
58	October 24, 1964	Seattle, WA	Oregon	7	Washington	0
59	October 23, 1965	Portland, OR	Washington	24	Oregon	0
60	October 22, 1966	Seattle, WA	Washington	10	Oregon	7

No.	Date	Location	Winning team		Losing team	
61	October 14, 1967	Eugene, OR	Washington	26	Oregon	0
62	October 12, 1968	Seattle, WA	Oregon	3	Washington	0
63	October 25, 1969	Eugene, OR	Oregon	22	Washington	7
64	October 31, 1970	Seattle, WA	Washington	25	#16 Oregon	23
65	October 16, 1971	Eugene, OR	Oregon	23	#18 Washington	21
66	October 7, 1972	Seattle, WA	#11 Washington	23	Oregon	17
67	October 27, 1973	Eugene, OR	Oregon	58	Washington	0
68	October 26, 1974	Seattle, WA	Washington	66	Oregon	0
69	October 4, 1975	Eugene, OR	Washington	27	Oregon	17
70	October 23, 1976	Seattle, WA	Washington	14	Oregon	7
71	October 8, 1977	Eugene, OR	Washington	54	Oregon	0
72	October 21, 1978	Seattle, WA	Washington	20	Oregon	14
73	September 22, 1979	Eugene, OR	#12 Washington	21	Oregon	17
74	September 27, 1980	Seattle, WA	Oregon	34	#13 Washington	10
75	September 26, 1981	Eugene, OR	#16 Washington	17	Oregon	3
76	September 25, 1982	Seattle, WA	#1 Washington	37	Oregon	21
77	October 22, 1983	Eugene, OR	#14 Washington	32	Oregon	3
78	October 20, 1984	Seattle, WA	#1 Washington	17	Oregon	3
79	October 5, 1985	Eugene, OR	Washington	19	Oregon	13
80	October 25, 1986	Seattle, WA	#8 Washington	38	Oregon	3
81	October 3, 1987	Eugene, OR	Oregon	29	#16 Washington	22
82	October 22, 1988	Eugene, OR	Oregon	17	#17 Washington	14
83	October 14, 1989	Seattle, WA	Washington	20	Oregon	14
84	October 13, 1990	Seattle, WA	#17 Washington	38	#19 Oregon	17
85	October 26, 1991	Seattle, WA	#3 Washington	29	Oregon	7
86	October 17, 1992	Eugene, OR	#1 Washington	24	Oregon	3
87	October 23, 1993	Seattle, WA	#22 Washington	21	Oregon	6
88	October 22, 1994	Eugene, OR	Oregon	31	#9 Washington	20
89	November 4, 1995	Seattle, WA	#19 Oregon	24	#15 Washington	22
90	October 26, 1996	Eugene, OR	#23 Washington	33	Oregon	14
91	November 8, 1997	Seattle, WA	Oregon	31	#6 Washington	28
92	November 7, 1998	Eugene, OR	#21 Oregon	27	Washington	22
93	October 2, 1999	Seattle, WA	Washington	34	#25 Oregon	20
94	September 30, 2000	Eugene, OR	#20 Oregon	23	#6 Washington	16
95	November 16, 2002	Eugene, OR	Washington	42	#23 Oregon	14
96	November 1, 2003	Seattle, WA	Washington	42	Oregon	10
97	October 30, 2004	Eugene, OR	Oregon	31	Washington	6
98	October 15, 2005	Eugene, OR	#20 Oregon	45	Washington	21
99	November 4, 2006	Eugene, OR	#24 Oregon	34	Washington	14
100	October 20, 2007	Seattle, WA	#7 Oregon	55	Washington	34
101	August 30, 2008	Eugene, OR	#21 Oregon	44	Washington	10
102	October 24, 2009	Seattle, WA	#12 Oregon	43	Washington	19
103	November 6, 2010	Eugene, OR	#1 Oregon	53	Washington	16
104	November 5, 2011	Seattle, WA	#6 Oregon	34	Washington	17
105	October 6, 2012	Eugene, OR	#2 Oregon	52	#23 Washington	21
106	October 12, 2013	Seattle, WA	#2 Oregon	45	#16 Washington	24
107	October 18, 2014	Eugene, OR	#9 Oregon	45	Washington	20
108	October 17, 2015	Seattle, WA	Oregon	26	Washington	20
109	October 8, 2016	Eugene, OR	#5 Washington	70	Oregon	21
110	November 4, 2017	Seattle, WA	#12 Washington	38	Oregon	3
111	October 13, 2018	Eugene, OR	#17 Oregon	30	#7 Washington	27^{OT}
112	October 19, 2019	Seattle, WA	#12 Oregon	35	#25 Washington	31
113	November 6, 2021	Seattle, WA	#4 Oregon	26	Washington	16
114	November 12, 2022	Eugene, OR	#25 Washington	37	#6 Oregon	34
115	October 14, 2023	Seattle, WA	#7 Washington	36	#8 Oregon	33
116	December 1, 2023	Paradise, NV	#3 Washington	34	#5 Oregon	31
117	November 30, 2024	Eugene, OR	#1 Oregon	49	Washington	21
118	November 29, 2025	Seattle, WA	#6 Oregon	26	Washington	14
Series: Washington leads 63–50–5

- Oregon's home games against Washington were played in Portland from 1911–1913 and 1926–1965.

=== Results by location ===
As of November 29, 2025

State	City	Games	Washington victories	Oregon victories	Ties	Years played
Washington	Seattle	57	33	22	2	1903–present
Oregon	Eugene	38	13	23	2	1900–24, 1967–present
Oregon	Portland	22	16	5	1	1911–13, 1926–65
Nevada	Paradise	1	1	0	0	2023

== Coaching records ==
- Since 1945

=== Oregon ===
Head coach	Games	Seasons	Wins	Losses	Ties	Pct.
Tex Oliver	3	1945–1946	0	3	0	.000
Jim Aiken	4	1947–1950	2	2	0	.500
Len Casanova	16	1951–1966	3	12	1	.219
Jerry Frei	5	1967–1971	3	2	0	.600
Dick Enright	2	1972–1973	1	1	0	.500
Don Read	3	1974–1976	1	2	0	.333
Rich Brooks	18	1977–1994	4	14	0	.222
Mike Bellotti	13	1995–2008	9	4	0	.692
Chip Kelly	4	2009–2012	4	0		1.000
Mark Helfrich	4	2013–2016	3	1		.750
Willie Taggart	1	2017	0	1		.000
Mario Cristobal	3	2018–2021	3	0		1.000
Dan Lanning	5	2022–2025	2	3		.400

=== Washington ===
Head coach	Games	Seasons	Wins	Losses	Ties	Pct.
Ralph Welch	4	1945–1947	3	1	0	.750
Howard Odell	5	1948–1952	4	1	0	.800
John Cherberg	3	1953–1955	2	1	0	.667
Darrell Royal	1	1956	1	0	0	1.000
Jim Owens	18	1957–1974	11	6	1	.639
Don James	18	1975–1992	15	3	0	.833
Jim Lambright	6	1993–1998	2	4	0	.333
Rick Neuheisel	3	1999–2002	2	1		.667
Keith Gilbertson	2	2003–2004	1	1		.500
Tyrone Willingham	4	2005–2008	0	4		.000
Steve Sarkisian	5	2009–2013	0	5		.000
Chris Petersen	6	2014–2019	2	4		.333
Jimmy Lake	1	2020–2021	0	1		.000
Kalen DeBoer	3	2022–2023	3	0		1.000
Jedd Fisch	2	2024–2025	0	2		.000

- Last tie was in 1962, overtime began in 1996 in Division I-A (once, 2018)
- Two games were played in 1945 and 2023
- Not scheduled in 2001, canceled (COVID-19) in 2020

== See also ==
- List of NCAA college football rivalry games
- List of most-played college football series in NCAA Division I
