= Ruppe =

Ruppe is a surname. Notable people with the surname include:

- Loret Miller Ruppe (1936–1996), American civic leader and diplomat
- Philip Ruppe (1926–2026), American politician
- Rudy Ruppe (1925–1976), American college football player, high school sports coach and administrator

== See also ==
- Rappe, another surname
- Rippe, another surname
