= 1948 California Golden Bears football team =

American college football season

1948 California Golden Bears football

PCC co-champion

Rose Bowl, L 14–20 vs. Northwestern
- Conference: Pacific Coast Conference

Ranking
- AP: No. 4
- Record: 10–1 (6–0 PCC)
- Head coach: Pappy Waldorf (2nd season)
- Home stadium: California Memorial Stadium

1948 Pacific Coast Conference football standings
	Conf.					Overall
Team	W		L		T	W		L		T
No. 4 California ^ +	6	–	0	–	0	10	–	1	–	0
No. 9 Oregon +	7	–	0	–	0	9	–	2	–	0
USC	4	–	2	–	0	6	–	3	–	1
Washington State	4	–	3	–	1	4	–	5	–	1
Stanford	3	–	4	–	0	4	–	6	–	0
Oregon State	2	–	3	–	2	5	–	4	–	3
Washington	2	–	5	–	1	2	–	7	–	1
UCLA	2	–	6	–	0	3	–	7	–	0
Idaho	1	–	5	–	0	3	–	6	–	0
Montana	0	–	3	–	0	3	–	7	–	0
+ – Conference co-champions; ^ – Selected as Rose Bowl representative; Rankings from AP Poll

The 1948 California Golden Bears football team was an American football team that represented the University of California, Berkeley in the Pacific Coast Conference (PCC) during the 1948 college football season. In their second year under head coach Pappy Waldorf, the Golden Bears compiled a 10–1 record (6–0 in PCC, first), tied for the PCC championship, lost to Northwestern in the Rose Bowl, and outscored its opponents 291 to 100. Home games were played on campus at California Memorial Stadium in Berkeley, California.

California was granted the Rose Bowl berth by a conference vote, but the PCC allowed a second bowl bid this season. Co-champion Oregon played SMU in the Cotton Bowl in Dallas on New Year's Day, and also lost.

A controversial moment in the Rose Bowl game is now known as the "phantom touchdown," when Northwestern's player was given a touchdown even though he fumbled the ball as while he was crossing the line, California disputed the touchdown arguing that the ball was fumbled prior to its crossing the line. California's claim is supported by a photograph taken at that moment.

== Schedule ==
Date	Opponent	Rank	Site	Result	Attendance	Source
September 18	Santa Clara*		California Memorial Stadium; Berkeley, CA	W 41–19	45,000	
September 25	at Navy*		Memorial Stadium; Baltimore, MD	W 21–7	30,000	
October 2	Saint Mary's*		California Memorial Stadium; Berkeley, CA	W 20–0	54,000	
October 9	Wisconsin*	No. 9	California Memorial Stadium; Berkeley, CA	W 40–14	66,000	
October 16	Oregon State	No. 6	California Memorial Stadium; Berkeley, CA	W 42–0	55,000	
October 23	at Washington	No. 4	Husky Stadium; Seattle, WA	W 21–0	38,000	
October 30	at USC	No. 4	Los Angeles Memorial Coliseum; Los Angeles, CA	W 13–7	90,890	
November 6	UCLA	No. 5	California Memorial Stadium; Berkeley, CA (rivalry)	W 28–13	65,000	
November 13	Washington State	No. 4	California Memorial Stadium; Berkeley, CA	W 44–14	52,000	
November 20	Stanford	No. 4	California Memorial Stadium; Berkeley, CA (Big Game)	W 7–6	80,000	
January 1, 1949	vs. No. 7 Northwestern*	No. 4	Rose Bowl; Pasadena, CA (Rose Bowl)	L 14–20	92,000	
*Non-conference game; Rankings from AP Poll released prior to the game; Source:

== Rankings ==
Ranking movements Legend: ██ Increase in ranking ██ Decrease in ranking ( ) = First-place votes
	Week								
Poll	1	2	3	4	5	6	7	8	Final
AP	9 (3)	6 (10)	4 (14)	4 (13)	5 (16)	4 (11)	4 (16)	5 (3)	4 (5)
