= 1948 Portland Pilots football team =

American college football season

1948 Portland Pilots football
- Conference: Independent
- Record: 2–5–1
- Head coach: Hal Moe (3rd season)
- Home stadium: Multnomah Stadium

1948 Western major college football independents records
	Conf.			Overall
Team	W	L	T	W		L		T
Nevada		–		9	–	2	–	0
Santa Clara		–		7	–	2	–	1
Saint Mary's		–		4	–	6	–	0
Portland		–		2	–	5	–	1
San Francisco		–		2	–	7	–	0

The 1948 Portland Pilots football team was an American football team that represented the University of Portland as an independent during the 1948 college football season. In its third and final year under head coach Hal Moe, the team compiled a 2–5–1 record. The team played its home games at Multnomah Stadium in Portland, Oregon.

Key players included quarterback Danny Christianson, left halfback John Freeman, right halfback Larry Wissbaum, and ends Joe Marshello, Ray Utz, and Bill Connell.

Portland was ranked at No. 197 in the final Litkenhous Difference by Score System ratings for 1948.

== Schedule ==
Date	Opponent	Site	Result	Attendance	Source
September 18	Willamette	Multnomah Stadium; Portland, OR	L 6–9		
September 25	Fresno State	Multnomah Stadium; Portland, OR	T 6–6		
October 9	at Oregon State	Bell Field; Corvallis, OR	L 6–32	6,500	
October 16	at Pacific (CA)	Baxter Stadium; Stockton, CA	L 15–61		
October 23	Montana State	Multnomah Stadium; Portland, OR	W 7–0		
October 30	Pepperdine	Portland, OR	W 21–0		
November 6	at Saint Mary's	Kezar Stadium; San Francisco, CA	L 0–19	3,500	
November 13	at Idaho	Neale Stadium; Moscow, ID	L 0–28	4,500	
