= 1948 Washington Huskies football team =

American college football season

1948 Washington Huskies football
- Conference: Pacific Coast Conference
- Record: 2–7–1 (2–5–1 PCC)
- Head coach: Howie Odell (1st season)
- Captain: Alf Hemsted
- Home stadium: University of Washington Stadium

1948 Pacific Coast Conference football standings
	Conf.					Overall
Team	W		L		T	W		L		T
No. 4 California ^ +	6	–	0	–	0	10	–	1	–	0
No. 9 Oregon +	7	–	0	–	0	9	–	2	–	0
USC	4	–	2	–	0	6	–	3	–	1
Washington State	4	–	3	–	1	4	–	5	–	1
Stanford	3	–	4	–	0	4	–	6	–	0
Oregon State	2	–	3	–	2	5	–	4	–	3
Washington	2	–	5	–	1	2	–	7	–	1
UCLA	2	–	6	–	0	3	–	7	–	0
Idaho	1	–	5	–	0	3	–	6	–	0
Montana	0	–	3	–	0	3	–	7	–	0
+ – Conference co-champions; ^ – Selected as Rose Bowl representative; Rankings from AP Poll

The 1948 Washington Huskies football team was an American football team that represented the University of Washington during the 1948 college football season. In its first season under head coach Howie Odell, the team compiled a 2–7–1 record, finished in seventh place in the Pacific Coast Conference, and was outscored 189 to 89. Alf Hemsted was the team captain.

Washington was ranked at No. 62 in the final Litkenhous Difference by Score System ratings for 1948.

== Schedule ==
Date	Opponent	Site	Result	Attendance	Source
September 25	Minnesota*	University of Washington Stadium; Seattle, WA	L 0–20	42,000	
October 2	at Oregon State	Multnomah Stadium; Portland, OR	T 14–14	25,000	
October 9	UCLA	University of Washington Stadium; Seattle, WA	W 27–6	28,500	
October 16	at Washington State	Rogers Field; Pullman, WA (rivalry)	L 0–10	23,000	
October 23	No. 4 California	University of Washington Stadium; Seattle, WA	L 0–21	38,000	
October 30	at Stanford	Stanford Stadium; Stanford, CA	L 0–20	35,000	
November 6	No. 16 Oregon	University of Washington Stadium; Seattle, WA (rivalry)	L 7–13	33,000	
November 13	at USC	Los Angeles Memorial Coliseum; Los Angeles, CA	L 7–32	44,345	
November 20	Idaho	University of Washington Stadium; Seattle, WA	W 34–7	20,000	
November 27	at No. 2 Notre Dame*	Notre Dame Stadium; Notre Dame, IN	L 0–46	50,609	
*Non-conference game; Rankings from AP Poll released prior to the game; Source:

== Professional football draft selections ==
One University of Washington Husky was selected in the 1949 AAFC Draft, which lasted 29 rounds with 136 selections.

= Husky Hall of Fame

Player	Position	Round	Pick	Club
Larry Hatch	Back	18	5	Los Angeles Dons
