= 1948 Oregon Ducks football team =

American college football season

1948 Oregon Ducks football

PCC co-champion

Cotton Bowl, L 13–21 vs. SMU
- Conference: Pacific Coast Conference

Ranking
- AP: No. 9
- Record: 9–2 (7–0 PCC)
- Head coach: Jim Aiken (2nd season)
- Captains: Brad Ecklund; Dan Garza; Don Stanton
- Home stadium: Hayward Field

1948 Pacific Coast Conference football standings
	Conf.					Overall
Team	W		L		T	W		L		T
No. 4 California ^ +	6	–	0	–	0	10	–	1	–	0
No. 9 Oregon +	7	–	0	–	0	9	–	2	–	0
USC	4	–	2	–	0	6	–	3	–	1
Washington State	4	–	3	–	1	4	–	5	–	1
Stanford	3	–	4	–	0	4	–	6	–	0
Oregon State	2	–	3	–	2	5	–	4	–	3
Washington	2	–	5	–	1	2	–	7	–	1
UCLA	2	–	6	–	0	3	–	7	–	0
Idaho	1	–	5	–	0	3	–	6	–	0
Montana	0	–	3	–	0	3	–	7	–	0
+ – Conference co-champions; ^ – Selected as Rose Bowl representative; Rankings from AP Poll

The 1948 Oregon Ducks football team represented the University of Oregon in the 1948 college football season. The Ducks competed as a member of the Pacific Coast Conference (PCC). The team was led by head coach Jim Aiken, in his second year, and played their home games at Hayward Field in Eugene and at Multnomah Field in Portland. Oregon finished the regular season ranked ninth, with nine wins and one loss, and won all seven conference games in the PCC. They did not play Montana or #4 California; the Golden Bears won all ten games during the regular season.

Denied a Rose Bowl berth by a conference vote, the PCC allowed a second bowl bid this season; Oregon played SMU in the Cotton Bowl in Dallas on New Year's Day.

== Schedule ==
Date	Opponent	Rank	Site	Result	Attendance	Source
September 18	Santa Barbara*		Hayward Field; Eugene, OR	W 55–7	10,000	
September 25	at Stanford		Stanford Stadium; Stanford, CA	W 20–12	32,000	
October 2	at No. 7 Michigan*		Michigan Stadium; Ann Arbor, MI	L 0–14	65,800	
October 9	at Idaho		Neale Stadium; Moscow, ID	W 15–8	12,000	
October 16	USC		Multnomah Stadium; Portland, OR	W 8–7	33,000	
October 23	Washington State^{†}		Hayward Field; Eugene, OR	W 33–7	19,500	
October 30	Saint Mary's*	No. 14	Hayward Field; Eugene, OR (Governors' Trophy Game)	W 14–13	10,000	
November 6	at Washington	No. 16	Husky Stadium (rivalry)	W 13–7	33,000	
November 12	at UCLA	No. 15	Los Angeles Memorial Coliseum; Los Angeles, CA	W 26–7	42,700	
November 20	at Oregon State	No. 13	Bell Field; Corvallis, OR (Civil War)	W 10–0	22,000	
January 1, 1949	vs. No. 10 SMU	No. 9	Cotton Bowl; Dallas, TX (Cotton Bowl)	L 13–21	69,000	
*Non-conference game; ^{†}Homecoming; Rankings from AP Poll released prior to the game

== Rankings ==
Ranking movements Legend: ██ Increase in ranking ██ Decrease in ranking — = Not ranked
	Week								
Poll	1	2	3	4	5	6	7	8	Final
AP	—	—	—	14	16	15	13	10	9

== Personnel ==
Notable players included quarterback Norm Van Brocklin, center Brad Ecklund, and halfback John McKay.
