= 1948 UCLA Bruins football team =

American college football season

1948 UCLA Bruins football
- Program for Oct. 23 game against OSC
- Conference: Pacific Coast Conference
- Record: 3–7 (2–6 PCC)
- Head coach: Bert LaBrucherie (4th season)
- Home stadium: Los Angeles Memorial Coliseum

1948 Pacific Coast Conference football standings
	Conf.					Overall
Team	W		L		T	W		L		T
No. 4 California ^ +	6	–	0	–	0	10	–	1	–	0
No. 9 Oregon +	7	–	0	–	0	9	–	2	–	0
USC	4	–	2	–	0	6	–	3	–	1
Washington State	4	–	3	–	1	4	–	5	–	1
Stanford	3	–	4	–	0	4	–	6	–	0
Oregon State	2	–	3	–	2	5	–	4	–	3
Washington	2	–	5	–	1	2	–	7	–	1
UCLA	2	–	6	–	0	3	–	7	–	0
Idaho	1	–	5	–	0	3	–	6	–	0
Montana	0	–	3	–	0	3	–	7	–	0
+ – Conference co-champions; ^ – Selected as Rose Bowl representative; Rankings from AP Poll

The 1948 UCLA Bruins football team was an American football team that represented the University of California, Los Angeles in the Pacific Coast Conference (PCC) during the 1948 college football season. In their fourth and final year under head coach Bert LaBrucherie, the Bruins compiled a 3–7 record (2–6 in PCC, eighth). Home games were played at the Los Angeles Memorial Coliseum.

UCLA was ranked at No. 69 in the final Litkenhous Difference by Score System ratings for 1948.

== Schedule ==
Date	Opponent	Site	Result	Attendance	Source
September 18	Washington State	Los Angeles Memorial Coliseum; Los Angeles, CA	W 48–26	43,399	
September 25	Northwestern*	Los Angeles Memorial Coliseum; Los Angeles, CA	L 0–19	55,156	
October 2	Idaho	Los Angeles Memorial Coliseum; Los Angeles, CA	W 28–12	21,024	
October 9	at Washington	Husky Stadium; Seattle, WA	L 6–27	28,500	
October 16	Stanford	Los Angeles Memorial Coliseum; Los Angeles, CA	L 14–34	40,341	
October 23	Oregon State	Los Angeles Memorial Coliseum; Los Angeles, CA	L 0–28	30,933	
October 30	at Nebraska*	Memorial Stadium; Lincoln, NE	W 27–15	36,000	
November 6	at No. 5 California	California Memorial Stadium; Berkeley, CA (rivalry)	L 13–28	65,000	
November 12	No. 15 Oregon	Los Angeles Memorial Coliseum; Los Angeles, CA	L 7–26	42,700	
November 20	USC	Los Angeles Memorial Coliseum; Los Angeles, CA (Victory Bell)	L 13–20	76,577	
*Non-conference game; Rankings from AP Poll released prior to the game; Source:
