= Joe Sheeketski =

American football player, coach, and administrator (1908–1995)

Biographical details
- Born: April 15, 1908; Pennsylvania, U.S.
- Died: April 22, 1995 (aged 87); Carson City, Nevada, U.S.

Playing career
- 1930–1932: Notre Dame
- Position: Halfback

Coaching career (HC unless noted)
- 1933–1938: Holy Cross (backfield)
- 1939–1941: Holy Cross
- 1945: Notre Dame (backfield)
- 1946: Iowa (line)
- 1947–1950: Nevada
- 1951: New York Yanks (backfield)
- 1954: Dayton (backfield)

Administrative career (AD unless noted)
- 1947–1951: Nevada

Head coaching record
- Overall: 39–29–3
- Bowls: 1–1

Joseph L. Sheeketski (April 15, 1908 – April 22, 1995) was an American football player, coach, and college athletics administrator. He served as the head football coach at the College of the Holy Cross from 1939 to 1941 and at the University of Nevada, Reno from 1947 to 1950, compiling a career college football record of 39–29–3.

== Early life and playing career ==
Sheeketski attended prep school in Shadyside, Ohio. He played halfback at the University of Notre Dame from 1930 to 1932 and graduated from the university in 1933.

== Coaching career ==
From 1933 to 1938, Sheeketski served as the backfield coach at the College of the Holy Cross in Worcester, Massachusetts, working under fellow Notre Dame alumnus, Eddie Anderson. Sheeketski succeeded Anderson as head coach in 1939 when Anderson left for the University of Iowa. Sheeketski was a special agent for the Federal Bureau of Investigation from 1942 to 1945. After World War II, Sheeketski returned to his alma mater as an assistant football coach for part of the 1945 season. The following year, he reunited with Anderson at Iowa and coached the line for the Hawkeyes.

== Head coaching record ==
Year	Team	Overall	Conference	Standing	Bowl/playoffs
Holy Cross Crusaders (Independent) (1939–1941)
1939	Holy Cross	7–2			
1940	Holy Cross	4–5–1			
1941	Holy Cross	4–4–2			
Holy Cross:		15–11–3			
Nevada Wolf Pack (Independent) (1947–1950)
1947	Nevada	9–2			W Salad
1948	Nevada	9–2			L Harbor
1949	Nevada	5–5			
1950	Nevada	1–9			
Nevada:		24–18			
Total:		39–29–3			
