= 1948 San Francisco Dons football team =

American college football season

1948 San Francisco Dons football
- Conference: Independent
- Record: 2–7
- Head coach: Joe Kuharich (1st season)
- Home stadium: Kezar Stadium

1948 Western major college football independents records
	Conf.			Overall
Team	W	L	T	W		L		T
Nevada		–		9	–	2	–	0
Santa Clara		–		7	–	2	–	1
Saint Mary's		–		4	–	6	–	0
Portland		–		2	–	5	–	1
San Francisco		–		2	–	7	–	0

The 1948 San Francisco Dons football team was an American football team that represented the University of San Francisco as an independent during the 1948 college football season. In their first season under head coach Joe Kuharich, the Dons compiled a 2–7 record and were outscored by their opponents by a combined total of 216 to 123.

San Francisco was ranked at No. 89 in the final Litkenhous Difference by Score System ratings for 1948.

== Schedule ==
Date	Opponent	Site	Result	Attendance	Source
September 26	Saint Mary's	Kezar Stadium; San Francisco, CA	W 7–0	30,000	
October 3	Nevada	Kezar Stadium; San Francisco, CA	L 7–26	32,500	
October 8	at Detroit	University of Detroit Stadium; Detroit, MI	L 7–40	16,123	
October 16	Oklahoma A&M	Kezar Stadium; San Francisco, CA	L 20–27	20,000	
October 31	Santa Clara	Kezar Stadium; San Francisco, CA	L 13–25	18,000	
November 5	at Loyola (CA)	Gilmore Stadium; Los Angeles, CA	W 28–0	5,785	
November 13	Pacific (CA)	Kezar Stadium; San Francisco, CA	L 14–32	10,000	
November 20	at Villanova	Shibe Park; Philadelphia, PA	L 13–46	10,000	
November 25	at St. Bonaventure	Forness Stadium; Olean, NY	L 14–20	9,000	
