= Howard Bliss =

American football player and coach (1916–2005)

Biographical details
- Born: July 26, 1916; Farmville, Virginia, U.S.
- Died: June 7, 2005 (aged 88); Crossville, Tennessee, U.S.

Playing career
- 1938: Purdue
- Position: Quarterback

Coaching career (HC unless noted)
- 1939–1940: Montpelier HS (OH)
- 1946: Miami (OH) (assistant)
- 1947: Valley City State
- 1948–1949: North Dakota State

Administrative career (AD unless noted)
- 1947–1948: Valley City State

Head coaching record
- Overall: 9–17 (college); 6–10 (high school)

Accomplishments and honors

Championships
- 1 NDIC (1947)

Clyde Howard Bliss (July 26, 1916 – June 7, 2005) was an American football player and coach. He served as the head football coach at Valley City State Teachers College—now known as Valley City State University—in 1947 and North Dakota Agricultural College—now known as North Dakota State University—compiling a career college football coaching record of 9–17.

== Playing career ==
Bliss was a quarterback at Purdue University, earning a varsity letter in 1938.

== Military service ==
Bliss served in the United States army from July 5, 1942 to May 18, 1946. He was a captain in field artillery.

== Coaching career ==
Bliss began his coaching career at the Montpelier High School in Montpelier, Ohio. After briefly attending the University of Michigan and serving in World War II, he became an assistant coach at Miami University in Oxford, Ohio. He was hired as the head football coach and athletic director at Valley City State University in Valley City, North Dakota in 1947.

Bliss was then hired as the head football coach at North Dakota State University–then known as North Dakota Agricultural College–where he served from 1948 to 1949.

== Later life and death ==
After retiring from coaching, Bliss worked for General Tire Company. He died in 2005.

== Head coaching record ==
=== College ===
Year	Team	Overall	Conference	Standing	Bowl/playoffs
Valley City State Vikings (North Dakota Intercollegiate Conference) (1947)
1947	Valley City State	6–1	6–1	1st	
Valley City State:		6–1	6–1		
North Dakota State Bison (North Central Conference) (1948–1949)
1948	North Dakota State	3–7	2–4	T–4th	
1949	North Dakota State	0–9	0–6	7th	
North Dakota State:		3–16	2–10		
Total:		9–17			
National championship Conference title Conference division title or championship game berth
