= 1948 USC Trojans football team =

American college football season

1948 USC Trojans football
- Conference: Pacific Coast Conference
- Record: 6–3–1 (4–2 PCC)
- Head coach: Jeff Cravath (7th season)
- Home stadium: Los Angeles Memorial Coliseum

1948 Pacific Coast Conference football standings
	Conf.					Overall
Team	W		L		T	W		L		T
No. 4 California ^ +	6	–	0	–	0	10	–	1	–	0
No. 9 Oregon +	7	–	0	–	0	9	–	2	–	0
USC	4	–	2	–	0	6	–	3	–	1
Washington State	4	–	3	–	1	4	–	5	–	1
Stanford	3	–	4	–	0	4	–	6	–	0
Oregon State	2	–	3	–	2	5	–	4	–	3
Washington	2	–	5	–	1	2	–	7	–	1
UCLA	2	–	6	–	0	3	–	7	–	0
Idaho	1	–	5	–	0	3	–	6	–	0
Montana	0	–	3	–	0	3	–	7	–	0
+ – Conference co-champions; ^ – Selected as Rose Bowl representative; Rankings from AP Poll

The 1948 USC Trojans football team represented the University of Southern California (USC) in the 1948 college football season. In their seventh year under head coach Jeff Cravath, the Trojans compiled a 6–3–1 record (4–2 against conference opponents), finished in third place in the Pacific Coast Conference, and outscored their opponents by a combined total of 142 to 87.

Though unranked in the final AP Poll, USC was ranked at No. 18 in the final Litkenhous Difference by Score System ratings for 1948.

== Schedule ==
Date	Opponent	Site	Result	Attendance	Source
September 17	Utah*	Los Angeles Memorial Coliseum; Los Angeles, CA	W 27–0	55,211	
September 24	Oregon State	Los Angeles Memorial Coliseum; Los Angeles, CA	W 21–6	50,237	
October 2	at Ohio State*	Ohio Stadium; Columbus, OH	L 0–20	75,102	
October 9	Rice*	Los Angeles Memorial Coliseum; Los Angeles, CA	W 7–0	49,531	
October 16	at Oregon	Multnomah Stadium; Portland, OR	L 7–8	33,000	
October 23	at Stanford	Stanford Stadium; Stanford, CA (rivalry)	W 7–6	40,000	
October 30	No. 6 California	Los Angeles Memorial Coliseum; Los Angeles, CA	L 7–13	90,890	
November 13	Washington	Los Angeles Memorial Coliseum; Los Angeles, CA	W 32–7	44,345	
November 20	at UCLA	Los Angeles Memorial Coliseum; Los Angeles, CA (Victory Bell)	W 20–13	76,577	
December 4	No. 2 Notre Dame*^{†}	Los Angeles Memorial Coliseum; Los Angeles, CA (rivalry)	T 14–14	100,571	
*Non-conference game; ^{†}Homecoming; Rankings from AP Poll released prior to the game; Source:

== Coaching staff ==
- Head coach: Jeff Cravath
- Assistant coaches: Bob Winslow, Sam Barry, Bob Snyder, Norm Verry, Roy Engle, Roy "Bullet" Baker, Raymond George
