= 1948 Washington State Cougars football team =

American college football season

1948 Washington State Cougars football
- Program for Nov. 6 game vs. OSC
- Conference: Pacific Coast Conference
- Record: 4–5–1 (4–3–1 PCC)
- Head coach: Phil Sarboe (4th season)
- Home stadium: Rogers Field, Tacoma Stadium

1948 Pacific Coast Conference football standings
	Conf.					Overall
Team	W		L		T	W		L		T
No. 4 California ^ +	6	–	0	–	0	10	–	1	–	0
No. 9 Oregon +	7	–	0	–	0	9	–	2	–	0
USC	4	–	2	–	0	6	–	3	–	1
Washington State	4	–	3	–	1	4	–	5	–	1
Stanford	3	–	4	–	0	4	–	6	–	0
Oregon State	2	–	3	–	2	5	–	4	–	3
Washington	2	–	5	–	1	2	–	7	–	1
UCLA	2	–	6	–	0	3	–	7	–	0
Idaho	1	–	5	–	0	3	–	6	–	0
Montana	0	–	3	–	0	3	–	7	–	0
+ – Conference co-champions; ^ – Selected as Rose Bowl representative; Rankings from AP Poll

The 1948 Washington State Cougars football team was an American football team that represented Washington State College during the 1948 college football season. Fourth-year head coach Phil Sarboe led the team to a 4–3–1 mark in the Pacific Coast Conference (PCC) and 4–5–1 overall.

Washington State was ranked at No. 64 in the final Litkenhous Difference by Score System ratings for 1948.

The Cougars' had four home games on campus in Pullman at Rogers Field, with the season finale in Tacoma.

== Schedule ==
Date	Opponent	Site	Result	Attendance	Source
September 18	at UCLA	Los Angeles Memorial Coliseum; Los Angeles, CA	L 26–48	43,399	
October 2	Stanford	Rogers Field; Pullman, WA	W 14–7	17,300	
October 9	at Montana	Dornblaser Field; Missoula, MT	W 48–0	9,000	
October 16	Washington	Rogers Field; Pullman, WA (rivalry)	W 10–0	23,000	
October 23	at Oregon	Hayward Field; Eugene, OR	L 7–33	20,000	
October 30	Idaho	Rogers Field; Pullman, WA (rivalry)	W 19–14	17,000	
November 6	Oregon State	Rogers Field; Pullman, WA	T 26–26	12,000	
November 13	at No. 4 California	California Memorial Stadium; Berkeley, CA	L 14–44	52,000	
November 20	at No. 12 Michigan State*	Macklin Stadium; East Lansing, MI	L 0–40	36,045	
November 27	No. 18 Penn State*	Tacoma Stadium; Tacoma, WA	L 0–7	18,000	
*Non-conference game; Rankings from AP Poll released prior to the game; Source:
