= 1948 Santa Clara Broncos football team =

American college football season

1948 Santa Clara Broncos football
- Conference: Independent
- Record: 7–2–1
- Head coach: Len Casanova (3rd season)
- Home stadium: Kezar Stadium

1948 Western major college football independents records
	Conf.			Overall
Team	W	L	T	W		L		T
Nevada		–		9	–	2	–	0
Santa Clara		–		7	–	2	–	1
Saint Mary's		–		4	–	6	–	0
Portland		–		2	–	5	–	1
San Francisco		–		2	–	7	–	0

The 1948 Santa Clara Broncos football team was an American football team that represented Santa Clara University as an independent during the 1948 college football season. In their third season under head coach Len Casanova, the Broncos compiled a 7–2–1 record and outscored their opponents by a combined total of 228 to 153. They played a schedule that included elite programs of the era, defeating Oklahoma and Stanford and playing a tie against Michigan State. (Oklahoma won 31 straight games after the loss to Santa Clara.) Santa Clara's sole losses in 1948 were to California and No. 10 SMU featuring Doak Walker.

Santa Clara was ranked at No. 26 in the final Litkenhous Difference by Score System ratings for 1948.

== Schedule ==
Date	Opponent	Rank	Site	Result	Attendance	Source
September 18	at California		California Memorial Stadium; Berkeley, CA	L 19–41	45,000	
September 25	Oklahoma		Kezar Stadium; San Francisco, CA	W 20–17	5,000	
October 2	at Fresno State		Ratcliffe Stadium; Fresno, CA	W 45–7	12,081	
October 9	at Stanford		Stanford Stadium; Stanford, CA	W 27–14	35,000	
October 15	at Loyola (CA)		Gilmore Stadium; Los Angeles, CA	W 47–0	10,000	
October 23	at No. 11 SMU		Cotton Bowl; Dallas, TX	L 0–33	50,000	
October 31	vs. San Francisco		Kezar Stadium; San Francisco, CA	W 25–13	18,000	
November 7	vs. No. 11 Nevada		Charles C. Hughes Stadium; Sacramento, CA	W 14–0	24,876	
November 14	vs. Saint Mary's		Kezar Stadium; San Francisco, CA	W 10–7	35,000	
November 27	No. 11 Michigan State		Kezar Stadium; San Francisco, CA	T 21–21	20,000	
Rankings from AP Poll released prior to the game
