= 1948 Idaho Vandals football team =

American college football season

1948 Idaho Vandals football
- Conference: Pacific Coast Conference
- Record: 3–6 (1–5 PCC)
- Head coach: Dixie Howell (2nd season)
- Home stadium: Neale Stadium

1948 Pacific Coast Conference football standings
	Conf.					Overall
Team	W		L		T	W		L		T
No. 4 California ^ +	6	–	0	–	0	10	–	1	–	0
No. 9 Oregon +	7	–	0	–	0	9	–	2	–	0
USC	4	–	2	–	0	6	–	3	–	1
Washington State	4	–	3	–	1	4	–	5	–	1
Stanford	3	–	4	–	0	4	–	6	–	0
Oregon State	2	–	3	–	2	5	–	4	–	3
Washington	2	–	5	–	1	2	–	7	–	1
UCLA	2	–	6	–	0	3	–	7	–	0
Idaho	1	–	5	–	0	3	–	6	–	0
Montana	0	–	3	–	0	3	–	7	–	0
+ – Conference co-champions; ^ – Selected as Rose Bowl representative; Rankings from AP Poll

The 1948 Idaho Vandals football team represented the University of Idaho in the 1948 college football season. The Vandals were led by second-year head coach Dixie Howell and were members of the Pacific Coast Conference.

Idaho was ranked at No. 90 in the final Litkenhous Difference by Score System ratings for 1948.

Home games were played on campus at Neale Stadium in Moscow, with one game in Boise at Public School Field.

Idaho was 3–6 overall and won one of their six PCC games; future schedules had fewer conference matchups. A night game was played in late September in Salt Lake City, a loss to Utah.

The Vandals' losing streak in the Battle of the Palouse with neighbor Washington State reached twenty games, with a 14–19 loss in Pullman on October 30. Idaho tied the Cougars two years later, but the winless streak continued until 1954.

In the rivalry game with Montana in Moscow a week earlier, Idaho won 39–0 to regain the Little Brown Stein. Montana won it back two years later with a one-point upset, then the Vandals won eight straight, through 1959.

== Schedule ==
Date	Time	Opponent	Site	Result	Attendance	Source
September 18	2:00 pm	at Oregon State	Bell Field; Corvallis, OR	L 12–27	8,400	
September 25	7:00 pm	at Utah*	Ute Stadium; Salt Lake City, UT	L 6–21	18,099	
October 2	2:00 pm	at UCLA	Los Angeles Memorial Coliseum; Los Angeles, CA	L 12–28	21,024	
October 9	2:00 pm	Oregon^{†}	Neale Stadium; Moscow, ID	L 8–15	12,000	
October 23	2:00 pm	Montana	Neale Stadium; Moscow, ID (Little Brown Stein)	W 39–0	7,500	
October 30	2:00 pm	at Washington State	Rogers Field; Pullman, WA (Battle of the Palouse)	L 14–19	17,000	
November 6	1:00 pm	vs. Montana State*	Public School Field; Boise, ID	W 28–12	5,500	
November 13	2:00 pm	Portland*	Neale Stadium; Moscow, ID	W 28–0	4,500	
November 20	2:00 pm	at Washington	Husky Stadium; Seattle, WA	L 7–34	20,000	
*Non-conference game; ^{†}Homecoming; All times are in Pacific time

== Coaching staff ==
- Ben Enis, line
- Gene Harlow, guards
- Perron Shoemaker, ends
- Steve Belko, freshmen

== All-conference ==
No Vandals were named to the All-Coast team; honorable mention were tackles Carl Kiilsgaard and Will Overgaard, guard Wilbur Ruleman, and back John Brogan.

== NFL draft ==
Two juniors from the 1948 Vandals were selected in the 1950 NFL draft:

Player	Position	Round	Pick	Franchise
Carl Kiilsgaard	T	5th	61	Chicago Cardinals
Jerry Diehl	HB	28th	360	Pittsburgh Steelers

Three sophomores were selected in the 1951 NFL draft:

Player	Position	Round	Pick	Franchise
Bill Fray	T	16th	191	New York Yanks
King Block	FB	21st	250	Detroit Lions
Jim Chadband	HB	28th	335	New York Yanks
