= 1948 Montana State Bobcats football team =

American college football season

1948 Montana State Bobcats football
- Conference: Rocky Mountain Conference
- Record: 2–7 (0–0 RMC)
- Head coach: Clyde Carpenter (3rd season)
- Home stadium: Gatton Field

1948 Rocky Mountain Conference football standings
	Conf.					Overall
Team	W		L		T	W		L		T
Colorado State–Greeley $	3	–	0	–	0	4	–	4	–	0
Western State (CO)	2	–	1	–	0	6	–	4	–	0
Colorado College	1	–	2	–	0	2	–	7	–	1
Colorado Mines	0	–	3	–	0	3	–	6	–	0
Montana State	0	–	0	–	0	2	–	7	–	0
$ – Conference champion

The 1948 Montana State Bobcats football team was an American football team that represented Montana State University in the Rocky Mountain Conference (RMC) during the 1948 college football season. In its third season under head coach Clyde Carpenter, the team compiled a 2–7 record.

Montana State was ranked at No. 225 in the final Litkenhous Difference by Score System ratings for 1948.

== Schedule ==
Date	Opponent	Site	Result	Attendance	Source
September 17	at Utah State	Aggie Stadium; Logan, UT	L 6–31		
September 25	North Dakota State	Gatton Field; Bozeman, MT	W 33–0		
October 2	Eastern Washington	Gatton Field; Bozeman, MT	L 6–13		
October 9	North Dakota^{†}	Gatton Field; Bozeman, MT	W 12–6	5,000	
October 16	vs. Montana	Naranche Stadium; Butte, MT (rivalry)	L 0–14	10,000	
October 23	at Portland	Multnomah Stadium; Portland, OR	L 0–7		
October 30	at Idaho State	Spud Bowl; Pocatello, ID	L 14–20		
November 6	vs. Idaho	Public School Field; Boise, ID	L 12–28	5,500	
November 13	vs. Wyoming	Daylis Stadium; Billings, MT (Midland Roundtable Grid Classic)	L 12–46	5,000	
^{†}Homecoming
