= 1948 Saint Mary's Gaels football team =

American college football season

1948 Saint Mary's Gaels football
- Conference: Independent
- Record: 4–6
- Head coach: Joe Verducci (1st season)
- Home stadium: Kezar Stadium

1948 Western major college football independents records
	Conf.			Overall
Team	W	L	T	W		L		T
Nevada		–		9	–	2	–	0
Santa Clara		–		7	–	2	–	1
Saint Mary's		–		4	–	6	–	0
Portland		–		2	–	5	–	1
San Francisco		–		2	–	7	–	0

The 1948 Saint Mary's Gaels football team was an American football team that represented Saint Mary's College of California during the 1948 college football season. In their first season under head coach Joe Verducci, the Gaels compiled a 4–6 record and were outscored by opponents by a combined total of 161 to 150.

Saint Mary's was ranked at No. 68 in the final Litkenhous Difference by Score System ratings for 1948.

== Schedule ==
Date	Opponent	Site	Result	Attendance	Source
September 19	at Loyola (CA)	Rose Bowl; Pasadena, CA	W 32–7	22,102	
September 26	vs. San Francisco	Kezar Stadium; San Francisco, CA	L 0–7	30,000	
October 2	at California	California Memorial Stadium; Berkeley, CA	L 0–20	54,000	
October 17	No. 17 Nevada	Kezar Stadium; San Francisco, CA	L 20–48	27,314	
October 23	at Denver	Hilltop Stadium; Denver, CO	W 33–22	15,712	
October 30	at No. 14 Oregon	Hayward Field; Eugene, OR (Governors' Trophy Game)	L 13–14	10,000	
November 6	Portland	Kezar Stadium; San Francisco, CA	W 19–0	3,500	
November 14	vs. Santa Clara	Kezar Stadium; San Francisco, CA	L 7–10	35,000	
November 20	at Boston College	Braves Field; Boston	L 7–19	13,693	
November 26	at San Jose State	Spartan Stadium; San Jose, California	W 19–14	14,000	
Rankings from AP Poll released prior to the game
