= 1948 Iowa State Teachers Panthers football team =

American college football season

1948 Iowa State Teachers Panthers football

NCC champion
- Conference: North Central Conference
- Record: 7–3 (5–0 NCC)
- Head coach: Clyde Starbeck (11th season)
- Home stadium: O. R. Latham Stadium

1948 North Central Conference football standings
	Conf.					Overall
Team	W		L		T	W		L		T
Iowa State Teachers $	5	–	0	–	0	7	–	3	–	0
South Dakota	4	–	1	–	0	7	–	3	–	0
North Dakota	3	–	3	–	0	3	–	7	–	0
South Dakota State	2	–	4	–	0	4	–	6	–	0
Morningside	2	–	4	–	0	3	–	6	–	0
Augustana (SD)	2	–	4	–	0	3	–	6	–	0
North Dakota State	2	–	4	–	0	3	–	7	–	0
$ – Conference champion

The 1948 Iowa State Teachers Panthers football team represented Iowa State Teachers College in the North Central Conference during the 1948 college football season. In its 11th season under head coach Clyde Starbeck, the team compiled a 7–3 record (5–0 against NCC opponents) and won the conference championship.

Five players were named to the all-conference team: halfbacks Paul Devan and Elvin Goodvin; tackles Jason Loving and Lee Wachenheim; and guard Harvey Wissler.

Iowa State Teachers was ranked at No. 131 in the final Litkenhous Difference by Score System ratings for 1948.

== Schedule ==
Date	Opponent	Site	Result	Attendance	Source
September 18	at Iowa State*	Clyde Williams Field; Ames, IA	L 7–27	10,867	
September 25	at Morningside	Sioux City, IA	W 32–0		
October 2	Drake*	O. R. Latham Field; Cedar Falls, IA	W 6–0		
October 9	South Dakota State	O.R. Latham Field; Cedar Falls, IA	W 33–7		
October 16	Western Michigan*	O. R. Latham Field; Cedar Falls, IA	W 13–6	5,500	
October 23	at North Dakota	Grand Forks, ND	W 26–14		
October 30	at Augustana (SD)	Sioux Falls, SD	W 34–0		
November 6	at Emporia State*	Emporia, KS	L 0–26		
November 13	North Dakota State	O. R. Latham Field; Cedar Falls, IA	W 19–0	3,000	
November 20	at Dayton*	Dayton, OH	L 7–33		
*Non-conference game
