= 1948 South Dakota State Jackrabbits football team =

American college football season

1948 South Dakota State Jackrabbits football
- Conference: North Central Conference
- Record: 4–6 (2–4 NCC)
- Head coach: Ralph Ginn (2nd season)

1948 North Central Conference football standings
	Conf.					Overall
Team	W		L		T	W		L		T
Iowa State Teachers $	5	–	0	–	0	7	–	3	–	0
South Dakota	4	–	1	–	0	7	–	3	–	0
North Dakota	3	–	3	–	0	3	–	7	–	0
South Dakota State	2	–	4	–	0	4	–	6	–	0
Morningside	2	–	4	–	0	3	–	6	–	0
Augustana (SD)	2	–	4	–	0	3	–	6	–	0
North Dakota State	2	–	4	–	0	3	–	7	–	0
$ – Conference champion

The 1948 South Dakota State Jackrabbits football team was an American football team that represented South Dakota State University in the North Central Conference during the 1948 college football season. In its second season under head coach Ralph Ginn, the team compiled a 4–6 record and outscored opponents by a total of 203 to 107.

== Schedule ==
Date	Opponent	Site	Result	Attendance	Source
September 10	Moorhead Teachers	Brookings, SD	W 21–7		
September 18	at Drake	Drake Stadium; Des Moines, IA	L 0–47		
September 24	Loras	Brookings, SD	L 6–20	3,500	
October 2	North Dakota	Brookings, SD	L 6–31		
October 9	at Iowa State Teachers	O. R. Latham Field; Cedar Falls, IA	L 7–33		
October 16	at North Dakota State	Dacotah Field; Fargo, ND (rivalry)	W 7–6		
October 23	Augustana (SD)	Brookings, SD	W 20–6		
October 30	at South Dakota	Vermillion, SD (rivalry, Dakota Day)	L 0–33	9,000	
November 5	Morningside	Brookings, SD	L 13–18		
November 13	at Colorado State–Greeley	Greeley, CO	W 27–2		
