= 1948 Nevada Wolf Pack football team =

American college football season

1948 Nevada Wolf Pack football

Harbor Bowl, L 7–27 vs. Villanova
- Conference: Independent
- Record: 9–2
- Head coach: Joe Sheeketski (2nd season)
- Home stadium: Mackay Stadium

1948 Western major college football independents records
	Conf.			Overall
Team	W	L	T	W		L		T
Nevada		–		9	–	2	–	0
Santa Clara		–		7	–	2	–	1
Saint Mary's		–		4	–	6	–	0
Portland		–		2	–	5	–	1
San Francisco		–		2	–	7	–	0

The 1948 Nevada Wolf Pack football team was an American football team that represented the University of Nevada as an independent during the 1948 college football season. In its second season under head coach Joe Sheeketski, the Wolf Pack compiled a 9–2 record, outscored opponents 480 to 133, and lost to Villanova 27–7 in the Harbor Bowl at San Diego.

Though unranked in the final AP poll, Nevada was ranked at No. 15 in the final Litkenhous Difference by Score System ratings for 1948.

Stan Heath and Alva Tabor played quarterback for Nevada this season. Tabor was one of the first African-Americans to play quarterback for a major college football team. Heath was fifth in the balloting for the Heisman Trophy.

== Schedule ==
Date	Opponent	Rank	Site	Result	Attendance	Source
September 24	at San Jose State		Spartan Stadium; San Jose, CA	W 39–0		
October 3	at San Francisco		Kezar Stadium; San Francisco, CA	W 26–7	32,500	
October 9	North Texas State	No. 19	Mackay Stadium; Reno, NV	W 48–7	8,600	
October 17	at Saint Mary's	No. 17	Kezar Stadium; San Francisco, CA	W 48–20	27,314	
October 23	at Tulsa	No. 15	Skelly Stadium; Tulsa, OK	W 65–14		
October 30	Oklahoma City^{†}	No. 10	Mackay Stadium; Reno, NV	W 79–13		
November 7	vs. Santa Clara	No. 11	Charles C. Hughes Stadium; Sacramento, CA	L 0–14	24,876	
November 11	at Fresno State	No. 16	Ratcliffe Stadium; Fresno, CA	W 53–7	13,500	
November 25	at Wichita		Mackay Stadium; Reno, NV	W 42–13		
December 17	at Hawaii		Honolulu Stadium; Honolulu, Territory of Hawaii	W 73–12	11,000	
January 1, 1949	vs. Villanova		Balboa Stadium; San Diego, CA (Harbor Bowl)	L 7–27	20,000	
^{†}Homecoming; Rankings from AP Poll released prior to the game

== Rankings ==
Ranking movements Legend: ██ Increase in ranking ██ Decrease in ranking — = Not ranked т = Tied with team above or below ( ) = First-place votes
	Week								
Poll	1	2	3	4	5	6	7	8	Final
AP	19	17	15т (1)	10 (3)	11 (5)	16	—	—	—
