= 1948 Stanford Indians football team =

American college football season

1948 Stanford Indians football
- Conference: Pacific Coast Conference
- Record: 4–6 (3–4 PCC)
- Head coach: Marchmont Schwartz (4th season)
- Home stadium: Stanford Stadium

1948 Pacific Coast Conference football standings
	Conf.					Overall
Team	W		L		T	W		L		T
No. 4 California ^ +	6	–	0	–	0	10	–	1	–	0
No. 9 Oregon +	7	–	0	–	0	9	–	2	–	0
USC	4	–	2	–	0	6	–	3	–	1
Washington State	4	–	3	–	1	4	–	5	–	1
Stanford	3	–	4	–	0	4	–	6	–	0
Oregon State	2	–	3	–	2	5	–	4	–	3
Washington	2	–	5	–	1	2	–	7	–	1
UCLA	2	–	6	–	0	3	–	7	–	0
Idaho	1	–	5	–	0	3	–	6	–	0
Montana	0	–	3	–	0	3	–	7	–	0
+ – Conference co-champions; ^ – Selected as Rose Bowl representative; Rankings from AP Poll

The 1948 Stanford Indians football team represented Stanford University in the 1948 college football season. Stanford was led by fourth-year head coach Marchmont Schwartz. The team was a member of the Pacific Coast Conference and played its home games at Stanford Stadium in Stanford, California.

Stanford was ranked at No. 45 in the final Litkenhous Difference by Score System ratings for 1948.

== Schedule ==
Date	Opponent	Site	Result	Attendance	Source
September 18	San Jose State*	Stanford Stadium; Stanford, CA (rivalry)	W 26–20	20,000	
September 25	Oregon	Stanford Stadium; Stanford, CA	L 12–20	32,000	
October 2	at Washington State	Rogers Field; Pullman, WA	L 7–14	17,300	
October 9	Santa Clara*	Stanford Stadium; Stanford, CA	L 14–27	35,000	
October 16	at UCLA	Los Angeles Memorial Coliseum; Los Angeles, CA	W 34–14	40,341	
October 23	USC	Stanford Stadium; Stanford, CA (rivalry)	L 6–7	40,000	
October 30	Washington	Stanford Stadium; Stanford, CA	W 20–0	35,000	
November 6	vs. No. 5 Army*	Yankee Stadium; Bronx, NY	L 0–43	55,000	
November 13	Montana	Stanford Stadium; Stanford, CA	W 39–7	7,500	
November 20	at No. 4 California	California Memorial Stadium; Berkeley, CA (Big Game)	L 6–7	80,000	
*Non-conference game; Rankings from AP Poll released prior to the game; Source:
