= 1948 South Dakota Coyotes football team =

American college football season

1948 South Dakota Coyotes football
- Conference: North Central Conference
- Record: 7–3 (4–1 NCC)
- Head coach: Harry Gamage (11th season)
- Home stadium: Inman Field

1948 North Central Conference football standings
	Conf.					Overall
Team	W		L		T	W		L		T
Iowa State Teachers $	5	–	0	–	0	7	–	3	–	0
South Dakota	4	–	1	–	0	7	–	3	–	0
North Dakota	3	–	3	–	0	3	–	7	–	0
South Dakota State	2	–	4	–	0	4	–	6	–	0
Morningside	2	–	4	–	0	3	–	6	–	0
Augustana (SD)	2	–	4	–	0	3	–	6	–	0
North Dakota State	2	–	4	–	0	3	–	7	–	0
$ – Conference champion

The 1948 South Dakota Coyotes football team was an American football team that represented the University of South Dakota as a member of the North Central Conference (NCC) during the 1948 college football season. In their 11th season under head coach Harry Gamage, the Coyotes compiled a 7–3 record (4–1 against NCC opponents), finished in second place out of seven teams in the NCC, and were outscored by a total of 292 to 129.

South Dakota was ranked at No. 165 in the final Litkenhous Difference by Score System ratings for 1948.

They played their home games at Inman Field in Vermillion, South Dakota.

== Schedule ==
Date	Opponent	Site	Result	Attendance	Source
September 17	Westmar*	Inman Field; Vermillion, SD	W 52–0		
September 24	Omaha*	Inman Field; Vermillion, SD	W 26–6		
October 1	Dakota Wesleyan*	Inman Field; Vermillion, SD	W 54–0		
October 9	Augustana (SD)	Inman Field; Vermillion, SD	W 39–12		
October 16	North Dakota	Memorial Stadium; Grand Forks, ND (rivalry)	L 7–13		
October 23	at Morningside	Public Schools Stadium; Sioux City, IA	W 14–7	7,000	
October 30	South Dakota State	Inman Field; Vermillion, SD (rivalry, Dakota Day)	W 33–0	9,000	
November 6	North Dakota State	Inman Field; Vermillion, SD	W 41–6		
November 13	Bradley	Peoria, IL	L 27–53		
November 20	Marquette	Marquette Stadium; Milwaukee, WI	L 0–32	6,000	
*Non-conference game
