= 1948 North Dakota Fighting Sioux football team =

American college football season

1948 North Dakota Fighting Sioux football
- Conference: North Central Conference
- Record: 3–7 (3–3 NCC)
- Head coach: Red Jarrett (4th season)
- Home stadium: Memorial Stadium

1948 North Central Conference football standings
	Conf.					Overall
Team	W		L		T	W		L		T
Iowa State Teachers $	5	–	0	–	0	7	–	3	–	0
South Dakota	4	–	1	–	0	7	–	3	–	0
North Dakota	3	–	3	–	0	3	–	7	–	0
South Dakota State	2	–	4	–	0	4	–	6	–	0
Morningside	2	–	4	–	0	3	–	6	–	0
Augustana (SD)	2	–	4	–	0	3	–	6	–	0
North Dakota State	2	–	4	–	0	3	–	7	–	0
$ – Conference champion

The 1948 North Dakota Fighting Sioux football team, also known as the Nodaks, was an American football team that represented the University of North Dakota in the North Central Conference (NCC) during the 1948 college football season. In its fourth year under head coach Red Jarrett, the team compiled a 3–7 record (3–3 against NCC opponents), finished in third place out of seven teams in the NCC, and was outscored opponents by a total of 179 to 123. The team played its home games at Memorial Stadium in Grand Forks, North Dakota.

== Schedule ==
Date	Opponent	Site	Result	Source
September 10	Oklahoma City*	Memorial Stadium; Grand Forks, ND	L 12–27	
September 17	Morningside	Memorial Stadium; Grand Forks, ND	W 20–7	
September 24	Saint John's (MN)*	Memorial Stadium; Grand Forks, ND	L 0–14	
October 2	at South Dakota State	Brookings, SD	W 31–6	
October 9	at Montana State*	Bozeman, MT	L 6–12	
October 16	South Dakota	Memorial Stadium; Grand Forks, ND (rivalry)	W 13–7	
October 22	Iowa State Teachers	Memorial Stadium; Grand Forks, ND	L 14–26	
October 30	North Dakota State	Memorial Stadium; Grand Forks, ND (rivalry)	L 7–19	
November 6	at Augustana (SD)	Sioux Falls, SD	L 13–14	
November 20	at Montana*	Dornblaser Field; Missoula, MT	L 7–14	
*Non-conference game
