= 1948 North Dakota State Bison football team =

American college football season

1948 North Dakota State Bison football
- Conference: North Central Conference
- Record: 3–7 (2–4 NCC)
- Head coach: Howard Bliss (1st season)
- Home stadium: Dacotah Field

1948 North Central Conference football standings
| | Conf. | | | | | Overall |
| Team | W | | L | | T | W | | L | | T |
|---|---|---|---|---|---|---|---|---|---|---|
| Iowa State Teachers $ | 5 | – | 0 | – | 0 | 7 | – | 3 | – | 0 |
| South Dakota | 4 | – | 1 | – | 0 | 7 | – | 3 | – | 0 |
| North Dakota | 3 | – | 3 | – | 0 | 3 | – | 7 | – | 0 |
| South Dakota State | 2 | – | 4 | – | 0 | 4 | – | 6 | – | 0 |
| Morningside | 2 | – | 4 | – | 0 | 3 | – | 6 | – | 0 |
| Augustana (SD) | 2 | – | 4 | – | 0 | 3 | – | 6 | – | 0 |
| North Dakota State | 2 | – | 4 | – | 0 | 3 | – | 7 | – | 0 |
$ – Conference champion

The 1948 North Dakota State Bison football team was an American football team that represented North Dakota Agricultural College (now known as North Dakota State University) in the North Central Conference (NCC) during the 1948 college football season. In its first season under head coach Howard Bliss, the team compiled a 3–7 record (2–4 against NCC opponents) and finished in a four-way tie for fourth/last place out of seven teams in the NCC.

The team played its home games at Dacotah Field in Fargo, North Dakota.

== Schedule ==
| Date | Opponent | Site | Result | Attendance | Source |
|---|---|---|---|---|---|
| September 11 | Bemidji State* | Dacotah Field; Fargo, ND | L 0–13 | | |
| September 17 | Concordia–Moorhead* | Dacotah Field; Fargo, ND | L 13–20 | | |
| September 25 | at Montana State* | Gatton Field; Bozeman, MT | L 0–33 | | |
| October 1 | Augustana (SD) | Dacotah Field; Fargo, ND | W 14–6 | | |
| October 8 | Morningside | Dacotah Field; Fargo, ND | L 7–22 | | |
| October 16 | South Dakota State | Dacotah Field; Fargo, ND (rivalry) | L 6–7 | | |
| October 23 | at Manitoba* | (Canada) Winnipeg, MB | W 28–6 | 1,000 | |
| October 30 | at North Dakota | Memorial Stadium; Grand Forks, ND (Nickel Trophy) | W 19–7 | | |
| November 6 | at South Dakota | Inman Field; Vermillion, SD | L 6–41 | | |
| November 13 | at Iowa State Teachers | O. R. Latham Stadium; Cedar Falls, IA | L 0–19 | 3,000 | |
*Non-conference game
