= Jim Aiken =

American football player and coach

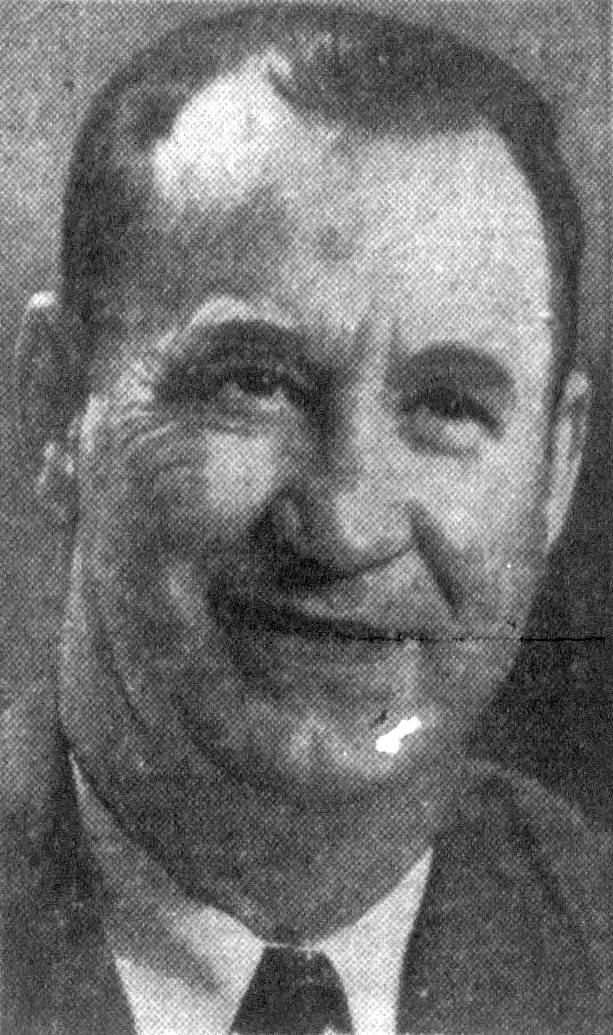
- Aiken, circa 1949

Biographical details
- Born: May 26, 1899; Wheeling, West Virginia, U.S.
- Died: October 31, 1961 (aged 62); Medford, Oregon, U.S.
- Education: Washington & Jefferson (1922)

Playing career

Football
- 191?–1921: Washington & Jefferson
- Position: End

Coaching career (HC unless noted)

Football
- 1922: Washington HS (PA)
- 1924–1925: Findlay HS (OH)
- 1926–1931: Toledo Scott HS (OH)
- 1932–1935: Canton McKinley HS (OH)
- 1936–1938: Akron
- 1939–1946: Nevada
- 1947–1950: Oregon

Basketball
- 1944–1945: Nevada

Administrative career (AD unless noted)
- 1939–1947: Nevada
- 1960–1961: Roseburg HS (OR)

Head coaching record
- Overall: 78–53–5 (college football); 8–9 (college basketball)
- Bowls: 0–1

Accomplishments and honors

Championships
- 1 FWC (1939); 1 PCC (1948)

James Wilson Aiken (May 26, 1899 – October 31, 1961) was an American football player and coach of football and basketball. He served as the head football coach at the University of Akron (1936–1938), the University of Nevada (1939–1946), and the University of Oregon (1947–1950), compiling a career college football record of 78–53–5. Aiken was also the head basketball coach at Nevada for a season in 1944–45, tallying a mark of 8–9.

== Early years ==
The son of a farmer, Aiken was born near Wheeling, West Virginia, and later moved to nearby Tiltonsville, Ohio. He attended Martins Ferry High School and was a standout athlete.

Following the First World War, Aiken enrolled at Washington & Jefferson College in Washington, Pennsylvania, and earned four letters in football as an end for the Presidents. He was a senior on the 1921 team under head coach Greasy Neale which played California to a scoreless tie in the Rose Bowl.

== High school coach ==
After graduation from college in 1922, Aiken was a successful high school football coach in Pennsylvania and Ohio, at Findlay High School in Findlay, Ohio, where he won a state championship in 1925, Scott in Toledo (1926–1931), and McKinley in Canton (1932–1935).

== College coach ==
From 1936 to 1938 at Akron, Aiken's teams posted a 19–7–1 record, which is the best mark in school history. From 1939 to 1946, at Nevada in Reno, he posted a 38–26–3 record. He moved to Oregon in 1947, and compiled a 21–20 record. In his first year in Eugene, he led the Ducks to a 7–3 record, followed by an undefeated conference record in 1948 and an appearance in the Cotton Bowl. In those first two seasons, the team was led on the field by quarterback Norm Van Brocklin, a future member of the Pro Football Hall of Fame. Halfback John McKay, future head coach at USC and the expansion Tampa Bay Buccaneers, transferred from Purdue and was a key member of the 1948 and 1949 teams.

== After coaching ==
After four seasons in Eugene, Aiken resigned as head coach at Oregon in June 1951, and entered the lumber business in Roseburg. Aiken had several mild heart attacks in the late 1950s and was later the athletic director at Roseburg High School. After giving a speech at a sports dinner in 1961 in Medford, he suffered a heart attack and died at age 62.

== Head coaching record ==
=== College football ===
Year	Team	Overall	Conference	Standing	Bowl/playoffs	AP^{#}
Akron Zips (Ohio Athletic Conference) (1936)
1936	Akron	6–2–1	5–1–1	3rd		
Akron Zips (Independent) (1937–1938)
1937	Akron	7–2				
1938	Akron	6–3				
Akron:		19–7–1	5–1–1			
Nevada Wolf Pack (Far Western Conference) (1939)
1939	Nevada	5–4	3–1	2nd (Note: The 1939 Fresno State Bulldogs football team had the best record in the Far Western Conference (FWC), but was ineligible for the conference championship because they only played two league games.)		
Nevada Wolf Pack (Independent) (1940–1945)
1940	Nevada	4–4–1				
1941	Nevada	3–5–1				
1942	Nevada	4–3–1				
1943	Nevada	4–1–1				
1944	Nevada	4–4				
1945	Nevada	7–3				
1946	Nevada	7–2				
Nevada:		38–26–4	3–1			
Oregon Ducks (Pacific Coast Conference) (1947–1950)
1947	Oregon	7–3	5–1	T–2nd		
1948	Oregon	9–2	7–0	T–1st	L Cotton	9
1949	Oregon	4–6	2–5	T–6th		
1950	Oregon	1–9	0–7	9th		
Oregon:		21–20	14–13			
Total:		78–53–5				
National championship Conference title Conference division title or championship game berth
^{#}Rankings from final AP Poll.
