= Reedsport Community Charter School =

Reedsport Community Charter High School
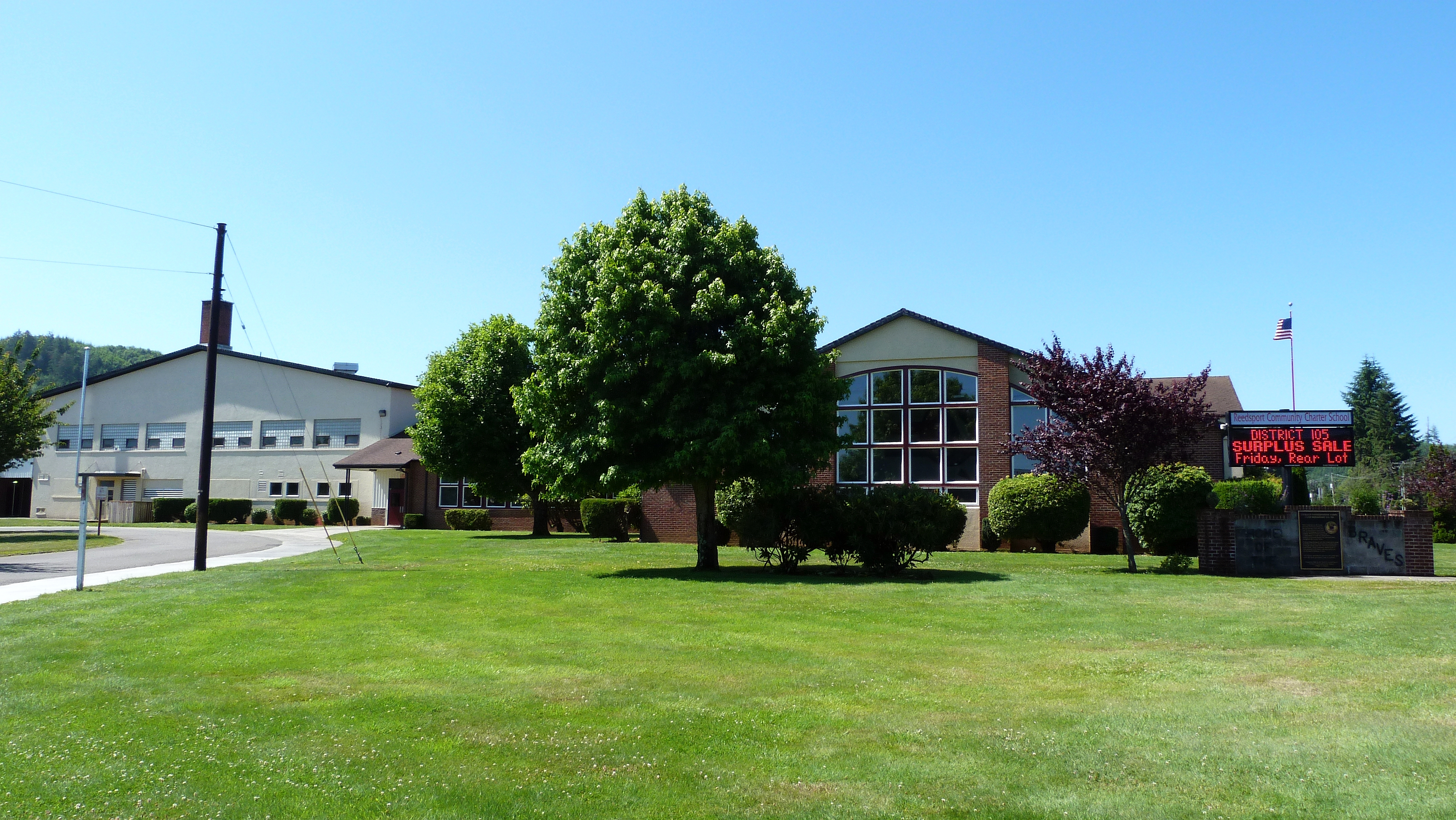

Location
- 2260 Longwood Drive; Reedsport, Douglas County, Oregon 97467; United States; 43.694347°N 124.123256°W

Information
- Type: Public charter school
- School district: Reedsport School District
- CEEB code: 380975
- NCES School ID: 411041000330
- Principal: Jerry Uhling
- Grades: 7–12
- Enrollment: 302 (2011-2012)
- Colors: Red and black
- Athletics conference: OSAA Sunset Conference 3A-4
- Mascot: Brave (compass)
- Team name: Brave
- Rival: Myrtle Point Bobcats
- Website: Reedsport Community Charter School website

Reedsport Community Charter School is a public school in Reedsport, Oregon, United States. It serves middle- and high school-aged students.

The school has roots in Reedsport Union High School, established in 1921.

== History ==
According to a 1959 newspaper history, the first dedicated high school in the Lower Umpqua region of Oregon's south coast was established in Gardiner in 1913 in a house owned by the Gardiner Lumber Company. The first graduating class came in 1918, when five local students received their high school diplomas. In Reedsport, high school classes were held in a tent in 1911, and as part of a one room schoolhouse starting in 1912.

With the coming of the railroad the isolated community grew, with 60 students packing the one-room schoolhouse in 1918. The growth in enrollment required the hiring of a second teacher, and in 1919 a four room school building was constructed, with one of these rooms designated for high school use.

This period of community growth continued during the years after World War I. In 1921 the Reedsport Union High School district was formed as part of process of establishing a permanent dedicated high school building. Construction was begun and finished in time for the new high school to graduate its first nine students in June 1922. A period of consolidation followed, with small schools such as Scottsburg discontinuing their high school program and sending students to Reedsport.

A new building for Reedsport High School was constructed in 1949, funded by a $416,000 bond issue. It was subsequently expanded, with four more classrooms added in 1955. By that juncture Reedsport Union had grown to the point that 70 diplomas were awarded to its class of 1955.

== Charter school ==
The school was formerly named the Reedsport Junior/Senior High School, but became a public charter school in February 2010. The school was remodeled just prior to the renaming.

== Academics ==
In 2017 the school offers English, social studies, REAP, credit recovery, shop, government, British lit, culinary, Spanish, health.

== Athletics ==
The Reedsport Braves compete as part of the Oregon School Activities Association's Sunset Conference. The school offers cheer, cross country, volleyball, football, bowling, basketball, wrestling, track and field, baseball, and swimming.

=== State championships ===
- Boys' basketball: 1946
- Football: 1945, 1956
