= Rippe =

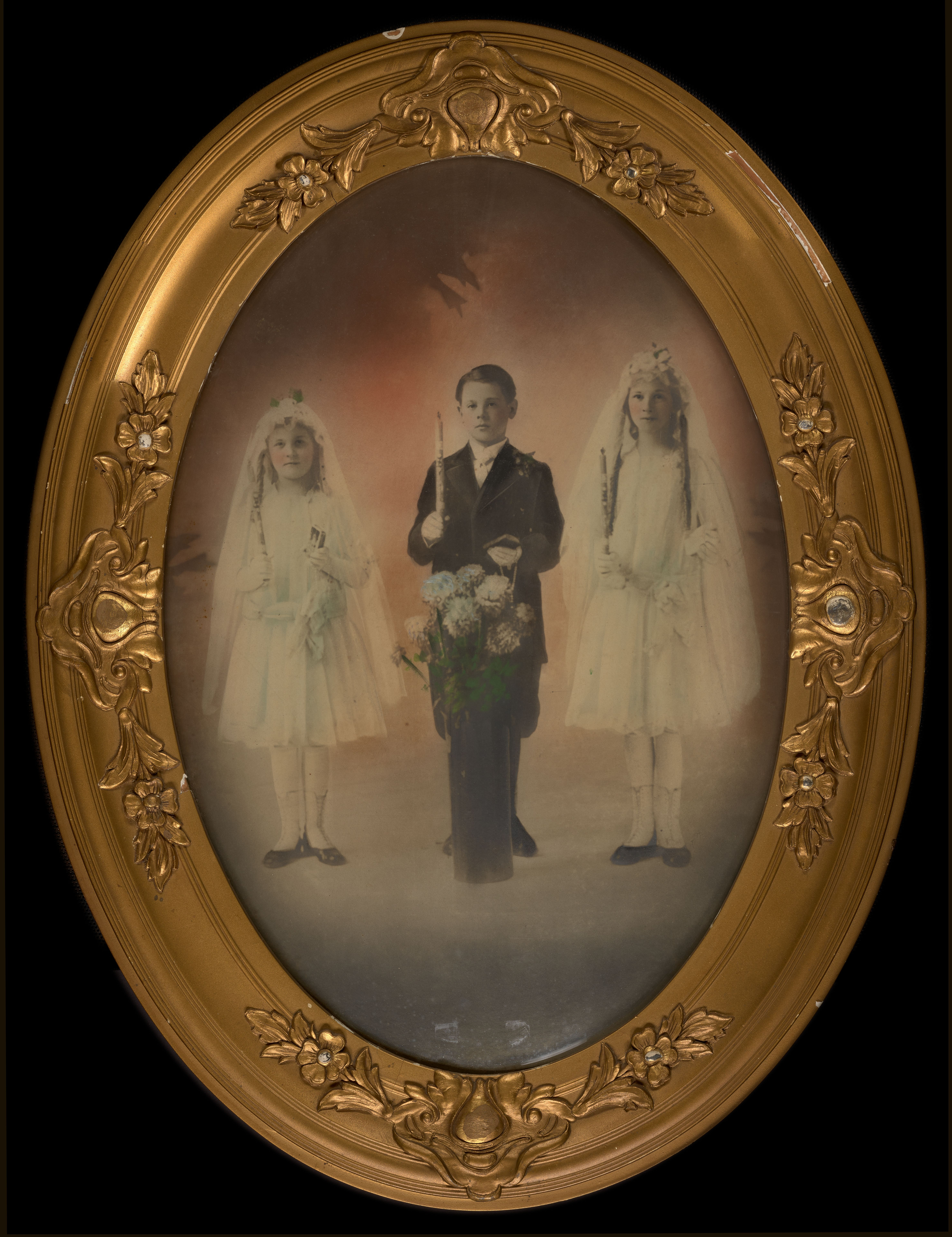
Three Rippe children from Plymouth, Minnesota, receiving first communion circa 1917.

Rippe is a surname. Notable people with this surname include:

- Albert de Rippe (1500–1551), Italian musician
- James Rippe (born 1947), American cardiologist
- Jan Rippe (born 1955), Swedish actor, singer, and comedian
- Siegbert Rippe (born 1936), Uruguayan lawyer

== See also ==
- La Rippe, Switzerland
