= Rudy Ruppe =

American football player and coach (1924–2002)

- Ruppe in 1948

Biographical details
- Born: April 13, 1925; North Bend, Oregon, U.S.
- Died: October 6, 1976 (aged 51); Coos Bay, Oregon, U.S.

Playing career

Football
- 1946–1949: Oregon State
- Positions: Quarterback, end, linebacker

Coaching career (HC unless noted)

Football
- 1952–1967: Reedsport HS (OR)

Basketball
- 1957–1958: Reedsport HS (OR)

Administrative career (AD unless noted)
- 1958–1968: Reedsport HS (OR)

Head coaching record
- Overall: 77–61–4 (football); 11–10 (basketball)

Accomplishments and honors

Championships
- Football; Oregon A-2 (1956)

Rudolph Robert Ruppe (April 13, 1925 – October 6, 1976) was an American college football player and high school sports coach and administrator. He was the starting quarterback at Oregon State College—now known as Oregon State University—in the late 1940s. A longtime coach and the first athletic director at Reedsport Union High School, Ruppe is the namesake of the Reedsport High School football field.

== Early life and playing career ==
Ruppe was born April 13, 1925. He attended North Bend High School, where he distinguished himself as an athlete, being regarded as among the best football players in the history of the school. Ruppe graduated from North Bend High in 1943 and enlisted in the United States Navy to serve during World War II. He remained in uniform for two years.

After the war, Ruppe enrolled at Oregon State College in Corvallis, Oregon, originally on a basketball scholarship. His best sport proved to be football, however, as he became a four-year football letterman for OSC. Ruppespent time as an end and as a single-wing quarterback (blocking back) on offense and at linebacker on the defensive side of the ball.

== Coaching career ==
Ruppe joined the coaching staff at Reedsport High School, the sole secondary school of a small community on the Southern Oregon coast, in 1952.

Ruppe's career coaching highlight came in the 1956 season, when the Reedsport Braves turned in a record of 11–1 en route to winning the Oregon state A-2 football championship. In addition, he was able to guide Reedsport to the state quarterfinals for their division in 1953, 1954, and 1961.

In 1957, Ruppe was also named the head basketball coach at Reedsport High. He turned in a record of 11–10 as head coach of the Reedsport roundball squad during his single season in charge.

In May 1958, Ruppe was named the first athletic director of Reedsport High, resigning his position as basketball coach to take the job. He remained at the helm of the Reedsport football team even after assuming athletic director's duties. He remained at the post for a total of 16 years, resigning in May 1968 at the age of 42. He closed his gridiron coaching career with the one state championship and an overall record of 77–61–4, for a winning percentage of .556.

Ruppe retained his role as the school's athletic director following the hanging up of the coaching whistle, also heading the school's physical education department and working as a school counselor. Ruppe expressed a feeling of joylessness at the time of his resignation from coaching, telling a local reporter, "While I have enjoyed working with boys, some of the fun has gone out of coaching. Possibly I can help them more in being able to devote more time to other phases of physical education and counseling."

Near the end of his life he revisited his decision to quit coaching more bitterly, however, declaring "the inability...of the kids to take orders, either from within or without" was the primary reason for his change of heart. "Parents and others who deal with kids were responsible for the breakdown in kids' discipline," Ruppe complained. "They let kids do whatever they wanted, and it simply backfired. The kids lost their ability to take orders."

== Later years, death, and legacy ==
Ruppe was a member of the Reedsport city council for six years.

In November 1973, with news of Ruppe's affliction amyotrophic lateral sclerosis (ALS), a degenerative and fatal motor neuron disease associated with former New York Yankees baseball star Lou Gehrig, having become widespread, a special halftime pause was held in Ruppe's honor during the regularly scheduled Friday night football game of the Reedsport Braves. Ruppe was also lauded with a lead editorial in the Coos Bay World as "a great teacher, a great citizen" and one who put the task of education ahead of athletic competition.

Ruppe's public words to irate boosters at the end of a relatively unsuccessful football season were recalled. "Gentlemen," he said, "if you expect me to win football games for you, then you have the wrong man. That is not my job."

Ruppe was further lauded at that November 2 game with the naming of the Reedsport football venue as "Rudy Ruppe Field" in his honor.

Ruppe died October 6, 1976, in a nursing home in Coos Bay, Oregon. He was 51 years old at the time of his death. He was buried at Reedsport Cemetery.
