= 1948 Montana Grizzlies football team =

American college football season

1948 Montana Grizzlies football
- Conference: Pacific Coast Conference
- Record: 3–7 (0–3 PCC)
- Head coach: Doug Fessenden (10th season)
- Home stadium: Dornblaser Field

1948 Pacific Coast Conference football standings
	Conf.					Overall
Team	W		L		T	W		L		T
No. 4 California ^ +	6	–	0	–	0	10	–	1	–	0
No. 9 Oregon +	7	–	0	–	0	9	–	2	–	0
USC	4	–	2	–	0	6	–	3	–	1
Washington State	4	–	3	–	1	4	–	5	–	1
Stanford	3	–	4	–	0	4	–	6	–	0
Oregon State	2	–	3	–	2	5	–	4	–	3
Washington	2	–	5	–	1	2	–	7	–	1
UCLA	2	–	6	–	0	3	–	7	–	0
Idaho	1	–	5	–	0	3	–	6	–	0
Montana	0	–	3	–	0	3	–	7	–	0
+ – Conference co-champions; ^ – Selected as Rose Bowl representative; Rankings from AP Poll

The 1948 Montana Grizzlies football team represented the University of Montana in the 1948 college football season as a member of the Pacific Coast Conference (PCC). The Grizzlies were led by tenth-year head coach Doug Fessenden, played their home games at Dornblaser Field and finished the season with a record of three wins and seven losses (3–7, 0–3 PCC).

Montana was ranked at No. 163 in the final Litkenhous Difference by Score System ratings for 1948.

== Schedule ==
Date	Opponent	Site	Result	Attendance	Source
September 18	vs. Eastern Washington*	Memorial Stadium; Great Falls, MT (rivalry)	L 7–12	5,000	
September 25	Utah State*	Dornblaser Field; Missoula, MT	L 7–18		
October 2	Pacific (OR)*	Dornblaser Field; Missoula, MT	W 27–0		
October 9	Washington State	Dornblaser Field; Missoula, MT	L 0–48	9,000	
October 16	vs. Montana State*	Naranche Stadium; Butte, MT (rivalry)	W 14–0	10,000	
October 23	at Idaho	Neale Stadium; Moscow, ID (Little Brown Stein)	L 0–39	7,500	
October 30	at BYU*	Cougar Stadium; Provo, UT	L 20–26		
November 6	Pacific (CA)*	Dornblaser Field; Missoula, MT	L 14–32	4,000	
November 13	at Stanford	Stanford Stadium; Stanford, CA	L 7–39	7,500	
November 20	North Dakota*	Dornblaser Field; Missoula, MT	W 47–7		
*Non-conference game; Source:
