= Dixon Recreation Center =

Building on the Oregon State University campus in Corvallis, Oregon, U.S.

Coordinates: 44.56310°N 123.27856°W

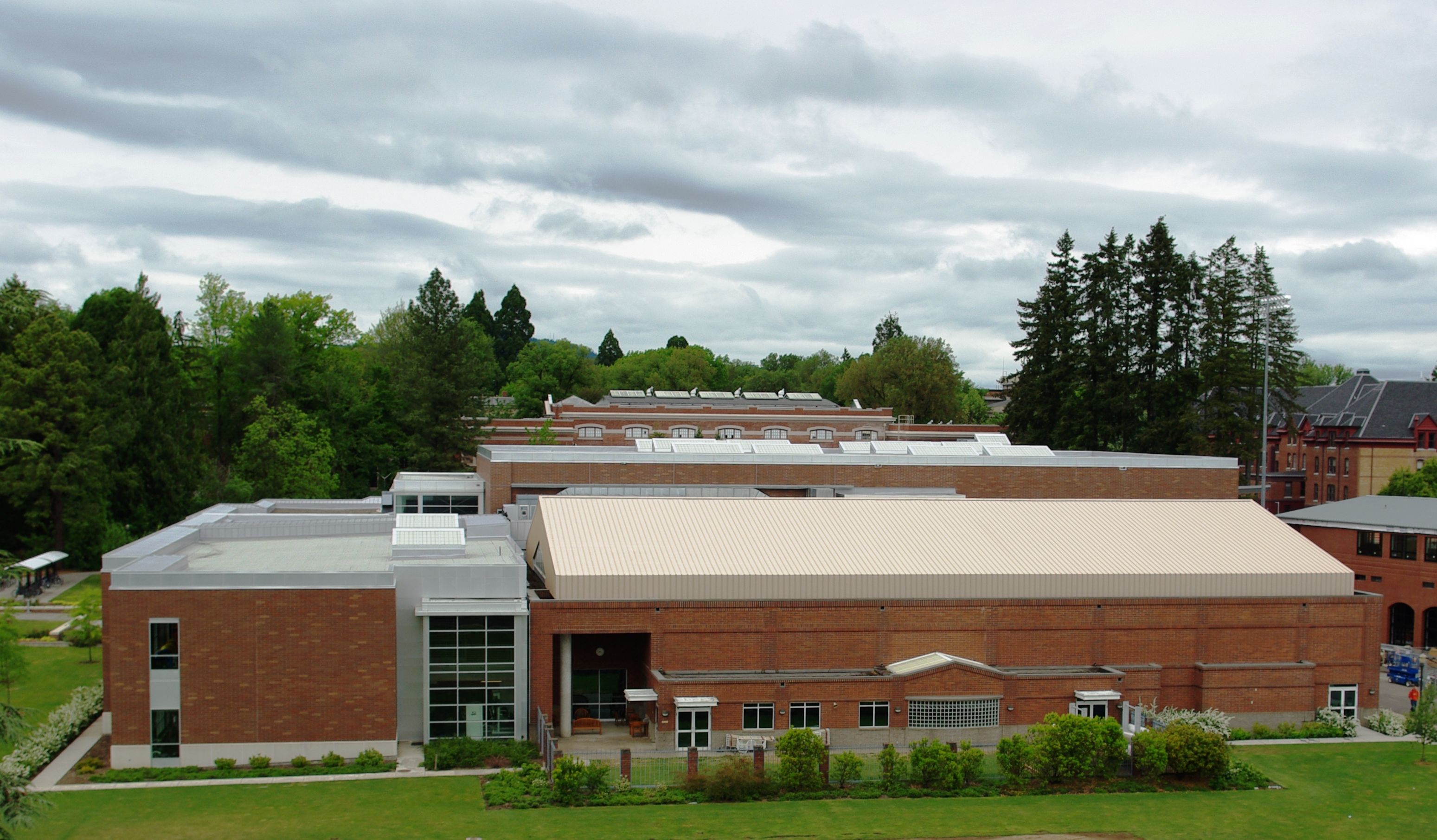
The center's exterior in 2008

Dixon Recreation Center is located on the Oregon State University campus in Corvallis, Oregon, United States.

The recreation center features two gyms, beach volleyball courts, a climbing area, multi-purpose rooms, a pool and dive well, racquetball courts, squash courts, indoor track and weight rooms.
