= Howie Odell =

American football player and coach (1910–2000)

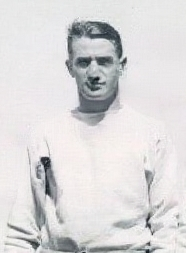
- Odell in 1937

Biographical details
- Born: November 30, 1910, U.S. Brooks, Iowa, U.S.
- Died: October 30, 2000 (aged 89); Portland, Oregon, U.S.

Playing career
- 1932–1933: Pittsburgh
- Positions: Running back, punter

Coaching career (HC unless noted)
- 1934–1935: Pittsburgh (backfield)
- 1936–1937: Harvard (assistant)
- 1938–1941: Penn (assistant)
- 1942 (spring): Wisconsin (backfield)
- 1942–1947: Yale
- 1948–1952: Washington

Head coaching record
- Overall: 58–40–4

King County Commissioner
- In office August 1, 1957 – February 1, 1962
- Preceded by: James A. Gibbs
- Succeeded by: Robert MacDonald Ford

Personal details
- Party: Democratic

Howard Odell (November 30, 1910 – October 30, 2000) was an American college football player and coach. He was the head coach at Yale University from 1943 to 1947, and at the University of Washington from 1948 to 1952, compiling a career record of 58–40–4 (.588). Born to Harry H. Odell, Howie Odell was one of six children.

Odell missed his first season with Washington in 1948 with a kidney ailment. He was fired by the athletic director after his fifth season with the Huskies in December 1952, after a 7–3 season and a third-place finish in the Pacific Coast Conference. Odell was officially let go by the university's board of regents a month later.

Odell opened a used car lot and was a television sportscaster, and ran for the Seattle City Council in 1954. He was elected to the King County Commission in 1957 and served until 1962. He then retired and moved to southern California, and spent his later years teaching ballroom dancing, working on hydroplanes, and playing golf.

== Head coaching record ==
Year	Team	Overall	Conference	Standing	Bowl/playoffs	Coaches^{#}	AP^{°}
Yale Bulldogs (Independent) (1942–1947)
1942	Yale	5–3					
1943	Yale	4–5					
1944	Yale	7–0–1					
1945	Yale	6–3					
1946	Yale	7–1–1					12
1947	Yale	6–3					
Yale:		35–15–2					
Washington Huskies (Pacific Coast Conference) (1948–1952)
1948	Washington	2–7–1	2–5–1	7th			
1949	Washington	3–7	2–5	T–6th			
1950	Washington	8–2	6–1	2nd		15	11
1951	Washington	3–6–1	1–5–1	7th			
1952	Washington	7–3	6–2	3rd			
Washington:		23–25–2	17–18–2				
Total:		58–40–0					
^{#}Rankings from final Coaches Poll.; ^{°}Rankings from final AP Poll.
