= 1949 Cotton Bowl Classic =

- 13th Cotton Bowl Classic
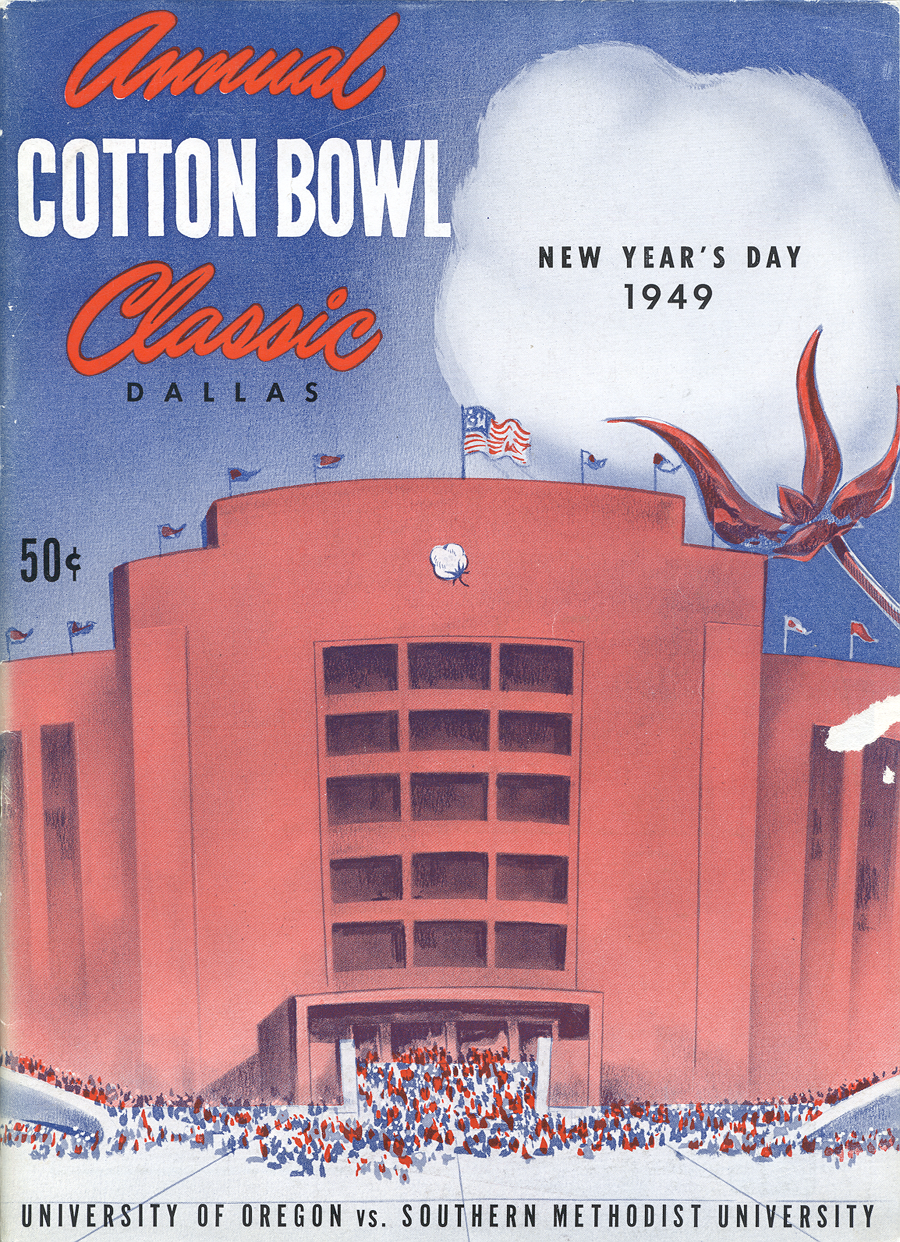
Oregon Ducks	SMU Mustangs
(9–1)	(8–1–1)
PCC	SWC
13	21
Head coach: Jim Aiken	Head coach: Matty Bell
AP 9	AP 10
	1	2	3	4	Total
Oregon	0	0	0	13	13
SMU	7	0	7	7	21
- Date: January 1, 1949
- Season: 1948
- Stadium: Cotton Bowl
- Location: Dallas, Texas
- MVP: RB Kyle Rote (SMU); RB Doak Walker (SMU); C Brad Ecklund (Oregon); QB Norm Van Brocklin (Oregon)
- Referee: Abb Curtis (SWC; split crew: SWC, Pacific Coast)
- Attendance: 69,000

The Cotton Bowl in Dallas, Texas, hosted the Cotton Bowl Classic.

The 1949 Cotton Bowl Classic was a post-season game between the SMU Mustangs and the Oregon Ducks. 20 points were scored in the final quarter.

== Background ==
SMU, despite losing for the first time in 1946, had a banner year once again as Doak Walker won the Heisman Trophy and led SMU to their 2nd consecutive Southwest Conference championship and 2nd straight Cotton Bowl. Oregon had only played in two bowl games, the last being the 1920 Rose Bowl. They shared the Pacific Coast Conference championship with California, who they did not play that season. While the Bears got the Rose Bowl, the Ducks (in a break of PCC tradition) were sent to the Cotton Bowl. They were coached by Jim Aiken and led by Norm Van Brocklin.

== Game summary ==
For the second straight Cotton Bowl, Doak Walker started the scoring, this time with a 1-yard touchdown run. Most notable in the game was SMU's deep punts, one by Doak Walker for 79 and one by Kyle Rote for 84, which was crucial in pinning the Ducks in their own territory. In the third quarter, Kyle Rote added to the lead with a 36-yard touchdown run. As the fourth quarter began, so did the scoring. Norm Van Brocklin threw a pass to Dick Wilkins to narrow the lead, but the kick failed, making it only 14–6. But SMU retaliated with their own score on a Chicken Roberts touchdown run. Oregon scored once more on a Bob Sanders touchdown run, but that was their last score as the game ended 21–13 in SMU's favor.

== Statistics ==
Statistics	SMU	Oregon
First downs	19	19
Yards rushing	226	242
Yards passing	111	145
Total yards	337	387
Punts-Average	3-68.7	3-31.0
Fumbles-Lost	0-0	2-1
Interceptions	0	2
Penalties-Yards	1-5	6-30
