= Bell Field =

Former outdoor athletic stadium in Corvallis, Oregon, USA

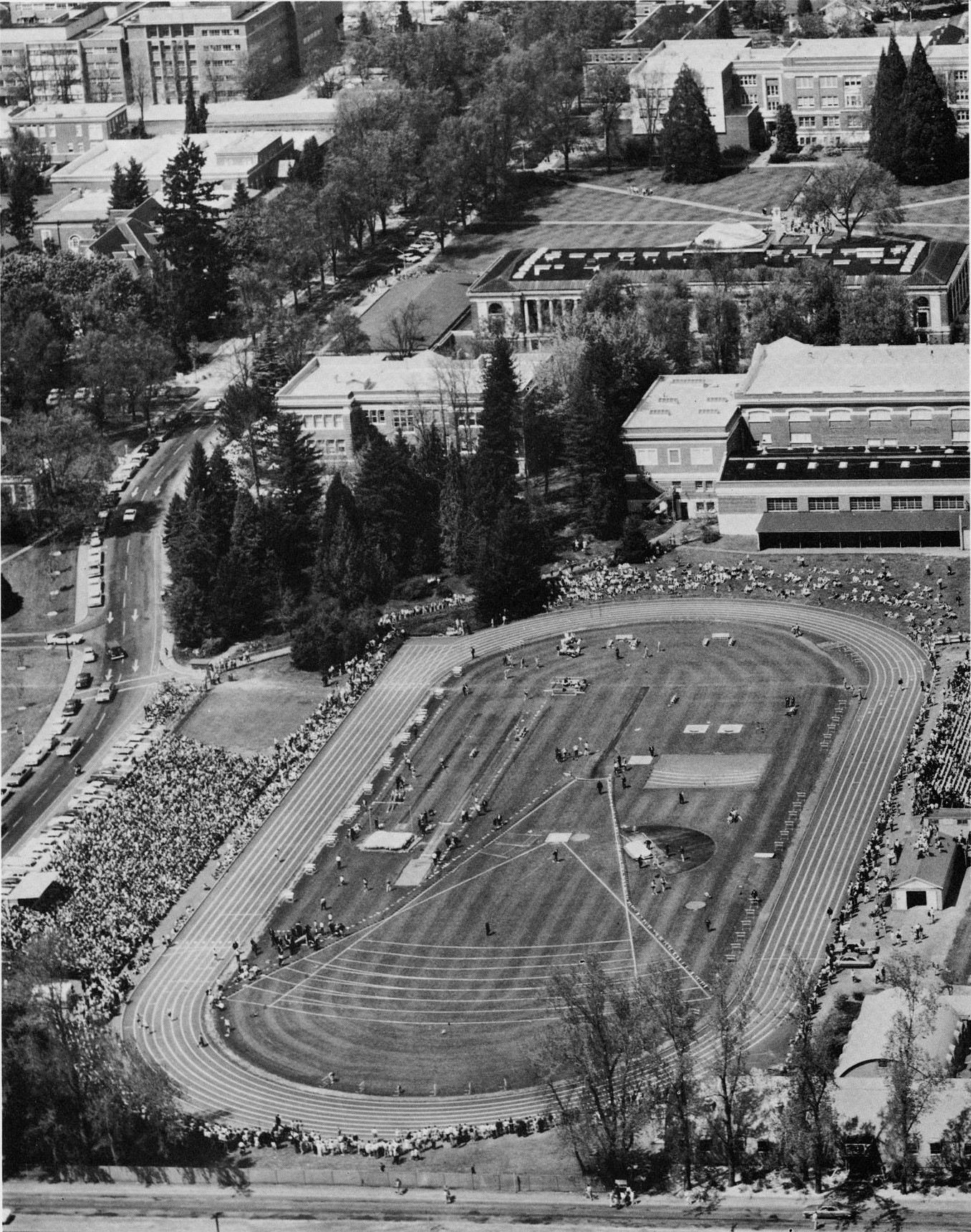
- Aerial view of track meet from the southeast

- Location in the United States Location in Oregon
- Interactive map of Bell Field
- Full name: Bell Field (from 1921)
- Former names: College Field
- Address: SW 26th Street & SW Washington Way
- Location: Oregon State University; Corvallis, Oregon, U.S.
- Coordinates: 44.563°N 123.279°W
- Capacity: 3,000 (1913); 7,000 (1920); 18,000 (1924); 21,000 (1947)
- Surface: Cinder track Grass infield (1937–1974); Dirt / sawdust (1910–1936)

Construction
- Opened: 1910
- Demolished: 1974

Tenants
- Oregon State Beavers (NCAA); Football: (1910–1952); Track and Field: (1911–1974)

Bell Field was an outdoor athletic stadium in the northwest United States, on the campus of Oregon State College (now University) in Corvallis, Oregon. Constructed in 1910, it was the home venue of Oregon State Beavers football prior to the opening of Parker Stadium (now Reser Stadium) in November 1953. Track and field continued at Bell Field until its demolition in 1974.

== History ==
=== Establishment ===
Bell Field opened at Oregon Agricultural College (OAC, today's Oregon State University) in 1909.

With a conventional north-south orientation, its low-profile seating was mostly covered in a horseshoe configuration, opening to the north, at an elevation of 230 feet (70 m) above sea level.

=== Namesake ===
The facility was as named after J.R.N. "Doc" Bell, an early supporter of the college and its athletic teams.

"Doc" J.R.N. Bell — popular "mascot" of early OAC football and namesake of Bell Field.

John Richard Newton Bell was born January 25, 1846, in Pulaski County, Virginia and fought in the 26th Virginia Infantry Battalion of the Confederate States Army during the American Civil War.

After the war ended, he attended Wytheville College in Virginia, from which he would eventually earn a Doctor of Divinity degree in 1871. He made his way to Oregon by way of Arkansas in the spring of 1874, becoming a minister of the First Presbyterian Church of Corvallis.

Bell was named a regent of Corvallis College — the religious academy which was later transformed into the state-owned Oregon Agricultural College — in 1874 and served in that capacity for several years, retaining a close personal sympathy for that institution throughout his life.

An early fan of American football, Bell boasted to Corvallis friends in the fall of 1894 that he would throw his best fedora hat into the Willamette River in celebration if the Aggies defeated their rivals from the University of Oregon on the gridiron. The Agrics won, 18–0, Bell's hat became a small boat to the Pacific Ocean, and a popular tradition was born. Henceforth, whenever the orange-and-black team beat the lemon-yellow team, a crowd would make their way to the river and Doc Bell would sail another hat to the sea.

Because of his quirky super-fan reputation, he soon became known as the "mascot" of the OAC football team. In 1921, the OAC Board of Regents named the field in his honor.

Bell died in Corvallis on June 3, 1928, age 82, following a protracted period of ill health. He was touted as the "oldest grand lodge chaplain in the history of Masonry," with 47 years of continuous service, at the time of his death.

=== Facility modifications ===
Originally a standing-room venue, the first seats were installed in 1913 — wooden bleachers on the east sideline, seating 3,000. The first covered grandstand was built on the west sideline in 1920, adding another 4,000 seats for a total capacity of 7,000.

Bell Field's east side bleachers, facing north, in 1914.

A covered two-deck bleacher seating 11,000, built in a horseshoe configuration around the south end of the field, was built in 1924, to be ready in time for use that same season. This construction, costing $21,000 (about $385,000 in 2025 dollars) increased total seating at the facility to 18,000.

A final seating expansion, taking place in 1947, replaced the stands on the east sideline with new bleachers, boosting total capacity to approximately 21,000. Even this proved insufficient, however, as by the early 1950s, Oregon State played its most important home football games in Portland at Multnomah Stadium.

A natural grass field for football was first installed at Bell Field in 1937; the surface was previously a mixture of dirt and sawdust. Such a field surface was not unique in the Northwest in the Pacific Coast Conference (PCC) — Hayward Field in Eugene, Multnomah Stadium in Portland, and Husky Stadium in Seattle made similar transitions to natural grass in this era.

The final varsity game at Bell Field was the only game on campus in 1952, a 27–6 homecoming loss to conference foe Idaho on November 15, with an approximate attendance of 8,000. The Beavers' sole win in the PCC that season was the following week in the Civil War game in Portland. The only game in 1953 in Corvallis was the opener for Parker Stadium on November 14, a 7–0 win over Washington State.

=== As a track-only facility ===
After Parker Stadium opened in 1953, most of the seating at Bell Field was removed, but it continued to host the school's track and field program on a cinder track until March 1974, after which it was torn down. Bell Field was located directly west of the baseball field (today's Goss Stadium at Coleman Field) and parallel to its first base line. The Dixon Recreation Center, opened in 1976, occupies the former Bell Field site.

A new all-weather track facility opened on the south end of campus in 1974, aligned northeast-southwest, and was named Wayne Valley Field the following year. OSU dropped its track programs (men & women) after the 1988 season, and the facility was removed in the 1990s, now occupied by the softball stadium and a gravel parking lot.

The women's track team was reintroduced at OSU in fall 2004 and the new Whyte Track and Field Center opened in September 2012. Adjacent to the southeast and lighted for night use, its alignment is nearly east-west, angled slightly northeast. It is bounded by 15th Street on the east and Philomath Boulevard (US 20) on the south.
