= Bill Ciaravino =

American football player (1929–2009)

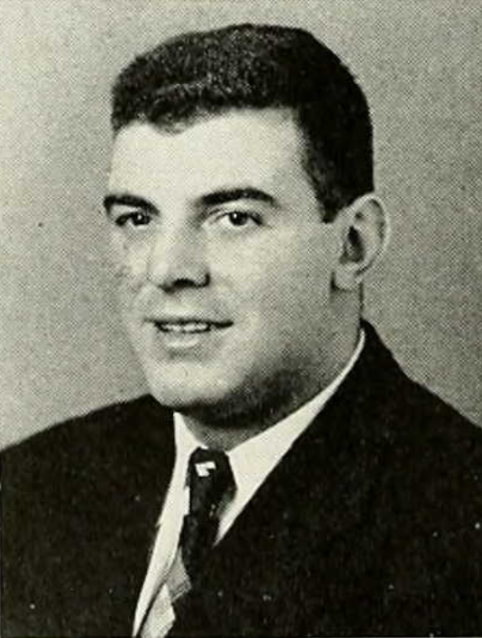
- Ciaravino from 1951 Epitome

Profile
- Positions: Guard, Linebacker

Personal information
- Born: December 20, 1929; New York
- Died: January 16, 2009 (aged 79); Huntington, New York

Career information
- College: Lehigh

Awards and highlights
- First-team All-American (1950)

Ignatius William Ciaravino (December 20, 1929 – January 16, 2009) was an American football player. He played college football for the Lehigh Mountain Hawks football team at the linebacker and guard positions. He was the defensive captain of the 1950 Lehigh team that compiled an undefeated 9–0 record, and he was selected by the International News Service as a first-team defensive player and on its 1950 College Football All-America Team. Ciararvino later attended medical school at Columbia School of Medicine. After serving two years serving as a medic in the United States Army, he established a medical practice, first in Brooklyn and later in Huntington, New York. He died in 2009 at age 79 in Huntington, New York. He was survived by his wife Helen and their three daughters, Francesca, Helene, and Maureen.
