= 1948 Pepperdine Waves football team =

American college football season

1948 Pepperdine Waves football
- Conference: Independent
- Record: 4–5
- Head coach: Warren Gaer (3rd season)
- Home stadium: Wrigley Field

1948 Western non-major college football independents records
| | Conf. | | | Overall |
| Team | W | L | T | W | | L | | T |
|---|---|---|---|---|---|---|---|---|
| Hawaii | | – | | 7 | – | 4 | – | 1 |
| Idaho State | | – | | 6 | – | 1 | – | 1 |
| Cal Poly San Dimas | | – | | 6 | – | 4 | – | 0 |
| Pepperdine | | – | | 4 | – | 5 | – | 0 |
| Loyola (CA) | | – | | 3 | – | 5 | – | 1 |
| La Verne | | – | | 3 | – | 5 | – | 0 |

The 1948 Pepperdine Waves football team represented George Pepperdine College (Note: Pepperdine University was known as George Pepperdine College from 1937 to 1970.) as an independent during the 1948 college football season. The team was led by third-year head coach Warren Gaer. For the 1948 season only, the Waves played home games at Wrigley Field in Los Angeles. Pepperdine finished the season with a record of 4–5.

== Schedule ==
| Date | Opponent | Site | Result | Attendance | Source |
|---|---|---|---|---|---|
| September 24 | at BYU | Cougar Stadium (Note: This stadium is the predecessor to the current Cougar Stadium on the BYU campus, which was opened for the 1964 season); Provo, UT | L 0–13 | | |
| October 2 | at Arizona State | Goodwin Stadium; Tempe, AZ | L 7–33 | | |
| October 9 | San Jose State | Wrigley Field; Los Angeles, CA | L 6–61 | 5,100 | |
| October 16 | at San Diego State | Balboa Stadium; San Diego, CA | L 6–7 | 18,000 | |
| October 23 | Fresno State | Wrigley Field; Los Angeles, CA | W 14–13 | 5,000 | |
| October 30 | at Portland | Multnomah Stadium; Portland, OR | L 0–21 | | |
| November 13 | Arizona State–Flagstaff | Wrigley Field; Los Angeles, CA | W 34–20 | 3,700 | |
| November 20 | Caltech | Wrigley Field; Los Angeles, CA | W 14–12 | | |
| November 27 | at Loyola (CA) | Gilmore Stadium; Los Angeles, CA | W 14–13 | 7,500 | |

== Team players in the NFL ==
No Pepperdine players were selected in the 1949 NFL draft.

The following player finished his collegiate playing career in 1948 at Pepperdine. He had played in the NFL during World War II, at age 19, and prior to playing football at Pepperdine.

| Player | Position | NFL team |
| Tom Bedore | Guard – Linebacker | 1944 Washington Redskins |
