= Duane Whitehead =

American college football player and coach (1925–1994)

Biographical details
- Born: May 13, 1925; Pomona, California, U.S.
- Died: May 8, 1994 (aged 68)

Playing career

Football
- 1943–1946: USC
- Position: Fullback

Coaching career (HC unless noted)

Football
- 1947: Covina HS (CA)
- 1948–1950: Cal Poly San Dimas
- 1952: Cal Poly San Dimas
- 1953–1954: San Mateo

Baseball
- 1949: Covina HS (CA)

Track and field
- 1954: San Mateo

Head coaching record
- Overall: 13–22–1 (college football); 1–16 (junior college football)

Duane Brower "Deber" Whitehead (May 13, 1925 – May 8, 1994) was an American college football player and coach. He served two stints as the head football coach at California Polytechnic School Vorhees Unit—then known commonly as California Poly San Dimas and now called California State Polytechnic University, Pomona—from 1948 to 1950 and again in 1952. Whitehead was also the head football coach at the College of San Mateo, a junior college in San Mateo, California, from 1953 to 1954.

Whitehead played football at Bonita High School in La Verne, California, when he was a teammate of Glenn Davis, and then at the University of Southern California (USC). He began his coaching career in 1947, when he was appointed head football coach at Covina High School in Covina, California. Whitehead also coached baseball at Covina before leaving for Cal Poly San Dimas in 1948. He was originally slated to assist Bob Ashton in coaching the 1948 Cal Poly San Dimas Broncos football team, but was elevated to head coach when Ashton left for Excelsior High School in Norwalk, California.

Whitehead left Cal Poly San Dimas in 1951, when he was called into active duty as a first lieutenant in the United States Marine Corps. He returned to Cal Poly San Dimas in 1952, after 14 months in the Marines. A year later, he left Cal Poly San Dimas again to become head football coach at the College of San Mateo. White also coached track at San Mateo in the spring of 1954 and taught hygiene before resigning from the college in 1955.

Whitehead later worked in the construction industry. He died on May 8, 1994.

== Head coaching record ==
=== College ===
Year	Team	Overall	Conference	Standing	Bowl/playoffs	UPI small college^{#}
Cal Poly San Dimas Broncos (Independent) (1948–1950)
1948	Cal Poly San Dimas	6–4				
1949	Cal Poly San Dimas	2–8				
1950	Cal Poly San Dimas	1–6–1				
Cal Poly San Dimas Broncos (Independent) (1952)
1952	Cal Poly San Dimas	4–4				
Cal Poly San Dimas:		13–22–1				
Total:		13–22–1				

=== Junior college football ===
Year	Team	Overall	Conference	Standing	Bowl/playoffs
San Mateo Bulldogs (Big Seven Conference) (1953–1954)
1953	San Mateo	1–8	0–6	7th	
1954	San Mateo	0–8	0–6	7th	
San Mateo:		1–16	0–12		
Total:		1–16			
