= Bill Sargent =

American football player and coach (1907–1963)

Biographical details
- Born: February 25, 1907
- Died: March 18, 1963 (aged 56); Lynwood, California, U.S.

Playing career
- 1928–1930: Loyola (CA)
- Position: End

Coaching career (HC unless noted)
- 1931–1936: Loyola (CA) (freshmen)
- 1937–1938: Loyola HS (CA)
- 1939–1940: Loyola (CA) (line)
- 1941–1946: Loyola HS (CA)
- 1944: Hollywood Rangers
- 1945–1946: Los Angeles Bulldogs
- 1947–1948: Loyola (CA)

Administrative career (AD unless noted)
- 1947–1948: Loyola (CA)

Head coaching record
- Overall: 6–12–1 (college); 11–0 (AFL); 14–7–2 (PCPFL)

Accomplishments and honors

Championships
- 1 American Football League (1944); 1 Pacific Coast Professional Football League (1946); 3 Catholic League (H.S.) (1944–1946)

William Hilton Sargent (February 25, 1907 – March 18, 1963) was an American college, high school, and professional football coach. He served as the head coach at Loyola Marymount University from 1947 to 1948. Sargent also coached the Los Angeles Bulldogs and Hollywood Rangers, professional teams that played in California-based leagues. He led those clubs to capture the Pacific Coast Professional Football League and the American Football League championships, respectively.

== Early life ==
Sargent attended Loyola Marymount University, where he played on the football team as a left end from 1928 to 1930, including a year under head coach Mike Pecarovich. In 1930, he played alongside two of his brothers on the Loyola line; Ted and George Sargent played at left tackle and left guard, respectively.

== Coaching career ==
After college, Sargent remained at his alma mater as its freshman team coach, a role in which he served through the 1936 season. Sargent resigned in April 1937 to take over as head coach at Loyola High School, also in Los Angeles, California, "where he built up an enviable record," according to the Spokane Daily Chronicle.

In November 1938, Loyola Marymount head coach Tom Lieb stepped down, and some favored Sargent as his replacement. The Loyola newspaper described him as a popular choice on campus due to his reputation as one of the best ends in school history, his experience as the freshman coach, and because many students had attended Loyola High. However, the position ultimately went to Mike Pecarovich, his former college coach who returned for a second stint at the school. The following February, Pecarovich hired Sargent as a line coach.

In 1941, Sargent was again coach at Loyola High School. In February, he was mentioned as a candidate for the vacant head coaching position at Ventura Junior College. He led the Loyola High Cubs to three consecutive Catholic League championships from 1944 to 1946.

=== California professional teams ===
In 1944, Sargent also coached the Hollywood Rangers in the short-lived American Football League of the Pacific Coast. He led the team to a perfect 11–0 record for the best finish in the eight-team league during its only season. The United Press credited some of the success to Sargent's decision to move former USC end Bob Winslow to quarterback, which it called a "brilliant stroke of genius."

In June 1945, Sargent took over as head coach for the Los Angeles Mustangs, formerly of the AFL, which continued to play as an independent. By November, Sargent was coach of the Los Angeles Bulldogs, a member of the Pacific Coast Professional Football League. That month, the club signed Frankie Albert, famed former Stanford quarterback. Sargent held that position through the 1946 season. On January 19, 1947, Los Angeles beat the Tacoma Indians, 38–7, to capture the league championship.

Around this time, boxer Joe Louis organized an all-star game intended to pit a collegiate team of recently graduated players—possibly to feature such stars as Charley Trippi, Buddy Young, Alex Agase, and Burr Baldwin—against a team of professional players. The game was scheduled for January 26, and the pros were to be coached by Sargent. In response, the PCPFL announced that it would bar its players from participating. Rufus J. Klawans, the league president, threatened to "blacklist" any of the league's players who participated in the unsanctioned event. However, members of the Bulldogs vowed to play in the all-star game anyway. Sargent devised a remedy for the situation: he would release the players before the game and re-sign them shortly afterward. The organizers ran into difficulty when the league players demanded more money after they learned Buddy Young, former University of Illinois star halfback, would be paid $5,000 for his professional debut in the contest. The Friday before the game, Sargent instructed his players not to participate. The game was cancelled due to the financial difficulties, which caused Louis to lose the $7,500 he had invested.

=== Return to college ===
In February 1947, Loyola Marymount hired Sargent as its head coach and athletic director, and awarded him a five-year contract. He said that he aimed to field the best possible team immediately and to rebuild the program for the future. The Lions managed only three wins in each of his two seasons, and Sargent compiled a 6–12–1 record. He did accomplish his second goal, however, and was credited with recruiting an excellent class in 1948. He resigned both of his athletic posts mid-season on November 10, 1948, at the recommendation of his physician.

Sargent later worked in the petroleum industry and traveled extensively. He was a vice president and the director of oil tool sales for the Sargent Engineering Corp.

== Death ==
Sargent died on March 18, 1963, in Lynwood, California, at the age of 56. Sargent suffered an apparent heart attack while at St. Francis Hospital.

== Head coaching record ==
=== College ===
Year	Team	Overall	Conference	Standing	Bowl/playoffs
Loyola Lions (Independent) (1947–1948)
1947	Loyola	3–7			
1948	Loyola	3–5–1			
Loyola:		6–12–1			
Total:		6–12–1			
