= Mike Casteel =

American football player and coach (1895–1977)

Miles W. Casteel
Biographical details
- Born: December 30, 1895; Elmira, New York, U.S.
- Died: March 27, 1977 (aged 81); Phoenix, Arizona, U.S.

Playing career

Football
- c. 1920: Kalamazoo
- 1922: Rock Island Independents
- Position: Quarterback

Coaching career (HC unless noted)

Football
- 1924–1938: Michigan State (assistant)
- 1939–1948: Arizona

Head coaching record
- Overall: 46–26–3
- Bowls: 0–1

Accomplishments and honors

Championships
- 1 Border (1941)

Miles Webster "Mike" Casteel (December 30, 1895 – March 27, 1977) was an American football player and coach. He played college football as the quarterback at Kalamazoo College and also played one season in the National Football League (NFL) for the Rock Island Independents. He later served as the head football coach at the University of Arizona in from 1939 to 1948, compiling a record of 46–26–3.

== Early years ==
Casteel was born in Elmira, New York. He attended Kalamazoo College where he played football, basketball and track. He also served in the United States Army during World War I, receiving the Silver Star for his performance in the artillery service at Verdun's north front. He returned to Kalamazoo after completing his military service, graduating in 1922.

He played in the National Football League as a back for the Rock Island Independents during the 1922 season, appearing in six games.

== Coaching ==
He began coaching at East Lansing High School in 1923 before joining Michigan Agricultural College as an assistant football coach in 1924. He also served as an assistant track coach at Michigan State and as a scout for the Green Bay Packers and Detroit Lions between 1934 and 1938.

In February 1939, he became the head football coach at the University of Arizona. He held that position until 1948, compiling a 46–26–3 record. In January 1949, the school's board of regents voted to terminate Casteel as head football coach.

== Later years ==
Casteel later served as director of Arizona State University's Sun Angel Foundation from 1950 to 1973. He died in 1977 at age 81.

== Head coaching record ==
Year	Team	Overall	Conference	Standing	Bowl/playoffs
Arizona Wildcats (Border Conference) (1939–1948)
1939	Arizona	6–4	1–2	5th	
1940	Arizona	7–2	3–1	2nd	
1941	Arizona	7–3	5–0	1st	
1942	Arizona	6–4	4–2	4th	
1943	No team—World War II				
1944	No team—World War II				
1945	Arizona	5–0			
1946	Arizona	4–4–2	2–2–1	4th	
1947	Arizona	5–4–1	3–2	4th	
1948	Arizona	6–5	3–2	T–3rd	L Salad
Arizona:		46–26–3	21–11–1		
Total:		46–26–3			
