= 1948 Detroit Titans football team =

American college football season

1948 Detroit Titans football
- Conference: Independent
- Record: 6–3
- Head coach: Chuck Baer (4th season)
- Home stadium: University of Detroit Stadium

1948 Midwestern major college football independents records
	Conf.			Overall
Team	W	L	T	W		L		T
No. 2 Notre Dame		–		9	–	0	–	1
Michigan State		–		6	–	2	–	2
Detroit		–		6	–	3	–	0
Marquette		–		2	–	8	–	0
Rankings from AP Poll

The 1948 Detroit Titans football team represented the University of Detroit as an independent during the 1948 college football season. Detroit outscored its opponents by a combined total of 209 to 112 and finished with a 6–3 record in its fourth year under head coach Chuck Baer.

Detroit was ranked at No. 60 in the final Litkenhous Difference by Score System ratings for 1948.

== Schedule ==
Date	Time	Opponent	Site	Result	Attendance	Source
September 24		Toledo	University of Detroit Stadium; Detroit, MI	W 36–0	20,741	
October 1		Marquette	University of Detroit Stadium; Detroit, MI	W 34–6	22,643	
October 8		San Francisco	University of Detroit Stadium; Detroit, MI	W 40–7	16,123	
October 15		Miami (FL)	University of Detroit Stadium; Detroit, MI	L 0–6	18,451	
October 22		Wayne	University of Detroit Stadium; Detroit, MI	W 13–0	24,321	
October 29		Villanova	University of Detroit Stadium; Detroit, MI	L 6–27	24,381	
November 6		at Denver	Hilltop Stadium; Denver, CO	L 27–30		
November 14	3:00 p.m.	at Saint Louis	Walsh Stadium; St. Louis, MO	W 27–14	6,387	
November 27		at Tulsa	Skelly Stadium; Tulsa, OK	W 26–22	3,406	
All times are in Eastern time

== See also ==
- 1948 in Michigan
