= 1948 Arizona State Sun Devils football team =

American college football season

1948 Arizona State Sun Devils football
- Conference: Border Conference
- Record: 5–5 (3–2 Border)
- Head coach: Ed Doherty (2nd season)
- Home stadium: Goodwin Stadium

1948 Border Conference football standings
| | Conf. | | | | | Overall |
| Team | W | | L | | T | W | | L | | T |
|---|---|---|---|---|---|---|---|---|---|---|
| Texas Tech $ | 5 | – | 0 | – | 0 | 7 | – | 3 | – | 0 |
| Texas Mines | 4 | – | 1 | – | 1 | 8 | – | 2 | – | 1 |
| Arizona | 3 | – | 2 | – | 0 | 6 | – | 5 | – | 0 |
| Arizona State | 3 | – | 2 | – | 0 | 5 | – | 5 | – | 0 |
| Hardin–Simmons | 3 | – | 2 | – | 1 | 6 | – | 2 | – | 3 |
| West Texas State | 2 | – | 3 | – | 0 | 6 | – | 5 | – | 0 |
| Arizona State–Flagstaff | 1 | – | 2 | – | 0 | 4 | – | 5 | – | 0 |
| New Mexico | 1 | – | 6 | – | 0 | 2 | – | 9 | – | 0 |
| New Mexico A&M | 0 | – | 4 | – | 0 | 3 | – | 7 | – | 0 |
$ – Conference champion

The 1948 Arizona State Sun Devils football team was an American football team that represented Arizona State College (later renamed Arizona State University) in the Border Conference during the 1948 college football season. In their second season under head coach Ed Doherty, the Sun Devils compiled a 5–5 record (3–2 against Border opponents) and outscored their opponents by a combined total of 276 to 192.

Arizona State was ranked at No. 168 in the final Litkenhous Difference by Score System ratings for 1948.

== Schedule ==
| Date | Opponent | Site | Result | Attendance | Source |
|---|---|---|---|---|---|
| September 25 | Western State (CO)* | Goodwin Stadium; Tempe, AZ | W 23–0 | | |
| October 2 | Pepperdine* | Goodwin Stadium; Tempe, AZ | W 33–7 | | |
| October 9 | at Utah State* | Aggie Stadium; Logan, UT | L 17–22 | | |
| October 16 | Arizona State–Flagstaff | Goodwin Stadium; Tempe, AZ | W 40–0 | | |
| October 30 | at Arizona | Arizona Stadium; Tucson, AZ (Territorial Cup) | L 21–33 | 16,200 | |
| November 5 | at New Mexico A&M | Quesenberry Field; Las Cruces, NM | W 52–7 | 2,500 | |
| November 12 | at Loyola (CA)* | Gilmore Stadium; Los Angeles, CA | L 12–16 | 4,000 | |
| November 20 | at Hardin–Simmons | Fair Park Stadium; Abilene, TX | L 25–63 | 4,500 | |
| November 26 | BYU* | Goodwin Stadium; Tempe, AZ | L 25–27 | | |
| December 4 | New Mexico^{†} | Goodwin Stadium; Tempe, AZ | W 28–17 | 10,000 | |
*Non-conference game; ^{†}Homecoming
