= 1948 Occidental Tigers football team =

American college football season

1948 Occidental Tigers football

SCC champion

Raisin Bowl, W 21–20 vs. Colorado A&M
- Conference: Southern California Conference
- Record: 9–0 (4–0 SCC)
- Head coach: Roy Dennis (4th season)
- Home stadium: Patterson Field

1948 Southern California Conference football standings
	Conf.					Overall
Team	W		L		T	W		L		T
Occidental $	4	–	0	–	0	9	–	0	–	0
Pomona	3	–	1	–	0	6	–	2	–	0
Whittier	2	–	2	–	0	6	–	4	–	0
Redlands	1	–	3	–	0	1	–	7	–	0
Caltech	0	–	4	–	0	1	–	6	–	0
$ – Conference champion

The 1948 Occidental Tigers football team represented Occidental College in the Southern California Conference (SCC) during the 1948 college football season. In their fourth season under head coach Roy Dennis, the Tigers compiled a perfect 9–0 record (4–0 against SCC opponents), won the SCC championship, and outscored all opponents by a total of 206 to 46.

The team concluded its season with a victory over Colorado A&M in the 1949 Raisin Bowl. Los Angeles Rams quarterback Bob Waterfield served as an advisory backfield coach as the team prepared for its bowl game.

Occidental was led on offense by halfback Johnny Trump and quarterback Joe Johnson.

== Schedule ==
Date	Opponent	Site	Result	Attendance	Source
October 2	at Cal Aggies*	A Street field; Davis, CA	W 28–0		
October 9	at Santa Barbara State*	La Playa Stadium; Santa Barbara, CA	W 8–7		
October 16	Cal Poly San Dimas*	Patterson Field; Los Angeles, CA	W 40–0		
October 23	at Whittier	Hadley Field; Whittier, CA (rivalry)	W 21–0	6,500	
October 29	vs. Caltech	Rose Bowl; Pasadena, CA	W 25–13	5,000	
November 6	at Redlands	Orange Bowl Stadium; San Bernardino, CA	W 28–6	4,000	
November 13	San Francisco State	Patterson Field; Los Angeles, CA	W 21–0	4,000	
November 20	Pomona^{†}	Patterson Field; Los Angeles, CA	W 14–0	9,000	
January 1, 1949	vs. Colorado A&M	Ratcliffe Stadium; Fresno, CA (Raisin Bowl)	W 21–20	10,000	
*Non-conference game; ^{†}Homecoming
