= 1948 Arizona Wildcats football team =

American college football season

1948 Arizona Wildcats football

Salad Bowl, L 13–14 vs. Drake
- Conference: Border Conference
- Record: 6–5 (3–2 Border)
- Head coach: Mike Casteel (8th season)
- Captains: Harry Varner; Art Converse
- Home stadium: Arizona Stadium

1948 Border Conference football standings
	Conf.					Overall
Team	W		L		T	W		L		T
Texas Tech $	5	–	0	–	0	7	–	3	–	0
Texas Mines	4	–	1	–	1	8	–	2	–	1
Arizona	3	–	2	–	0	6	–	5	–	0
Arizona State	3	–	2	–	0	5	–	5	–	0
Hardin–Simmons	3	–	2	–	1	6	–	2	–	3
West Texas State	2	–	3	–	0	6	–	5	–	0
Arizona State–Flagstaff	1	–	2	–	0	4	–	5	–	0
New Mexico	1	–	6	–	0	2	–	9	–	0
New Mexico A&M	0	–	4	–	0	3	–	7	–	0
$ – Conference champion

The 1948 Arizona Wildcats football team represented the University of Arizona in the Border Conference during the 1948 college football season. In their eighth and final season under head coach Mike Casteel, the Wildcats compiled a 6–5 record (3–2 against Border opponents), finished in a tie for third place in the conference, lost to Drake in the 1949 Salad Bowl, and were outscored by their opponents, 246 to 167. The team captains were Harry Varner and Art Converse.

Arizona was ranked at No. 114 in the final Litkenhous Difference by Score System ratings for 1948.

The team played its home games in Arizona Stadium in Tucson, Arizona.

== Schedule ==
Date	Opponent	Site	Result	Attendance	Source
September 25	San Diego State*	Arizona Stadium; Tucson, AZ	W 14–6	14,000	
October 2	at Utah*	Ute Stadium; Salt Lake City, UT	L 14–47	21,355	
October 9	Hardin–Simmons	Arizona Stadium; Tucson, AZ	W 20–14	14,000	
October 16	at Michigan State*	Macklin Stadium; East Lansing, MI	L 7–61	36,616	
October 23	Texas Tech	Arizona Stadium; Tucson, AZ	L 0–31	17,000	
October 30	Arizona State	Arizona Stadium; Tucson, AZ (rivalry)	W 33–21	16,200	
November 6	at New Mexico	Zimmerman Field; Albuquerque, NM (rivalry)	W 14–6	13,000	
November 13	Texas Mines	Arizona Stadium; Tucson, AZ	L 14–25	13,500	
November 20	Iowa State*	Arizona Stadium; Tucson, AZ	W 14–7	13,771	
November 27	vs. Marquette*	Montgomery Stadium; Phoenix, AZ	W 24–14	11,000	
January 1, 1949	vs. Drake*	Montgomery Stadium; Phoenix, AZ (Salad Bowl)	L 13–14	17,500	
*Non-conference game
