= 1949 Salad Bowl =

Drake Bulldogs	Arizona Wildcats
(6–3)	(6–3)
14	13
Head coach: Albert Kawal	Head coach: Mike Casteel
	1	2	3	4	Total
Drake	7	7	0	0	14
Arizona	0	7	6	0	13
- Date: January 1, 1949
- Season: 1948
- Stadium: Montgomery Stadium
- Location: Phoenix, Arizona
- MVP: Floyd Miller (Drake)
- National anthem: Marching Bands
- Attendance: 17,500

The 1949 Salad Bowl was a college football bowl game played between Drake Bulldogs and Arizona Wildcats at Montgomery Stadium in Phoenix, Arizona. The game marked the second bowl game for each school. Drake had previously played in the 1946 Raisin Bowl, while Arizona was featured in the 1921 San Diego E-W Christmas Classic. The game was sponsored by Phoenix Kiwanis Club.

The Wildcats out-gained Drake in total yards 355-206; however, the Bulldogs capitalized from three costly Arizona turnovers during the contest.

== Game summary ==
Drake's Frank Metzger scored on a 1-yard run to give the Bulldogs an early 7–0 lead. The second quarter would see the Bulldogs go up 14–0 thanks to a Floyd Miller 20-yard interception return. An Ed Walgast 15-yard run would cut the lead to 14–7 at half. Late in the third quarter, Charlie Hall returned a punt 79-yards for a touchdown, but the ensuing extra point by one of the nation's top kickers Tackett hit the upright, preserving a 14–13 lead. Neither team would score in the four quarter. With time running out Arizona fumbled at the Drake 11-yard line on a potential game-winning drive, allowing Drake to capture a 14–13 victory.

The victory improved Drake's bowl record to 2–0. Arizona fell to 0–2 in bowl games.

== Scoring summary ==
First quarter

- Drake- Frank Metzger 1 yard touchdown run (Steere kick)

Second quarter

- Drake- Floyd Miller 20-yard interception return (Steere kick)
- Arizona- Ed Wolgast 15 yard touchdown run (Tackett kick)

Third quarter

- Arizona- Ed Wolgast 6 yard touchdown run (failed PAT)

Fourth quarter

- None

== Statistics ==
Statistics	Drake	Arizona
First downs	9	15
Rushing yards	119	278
Passing yards	30	31
Total offense	149	309
Interceptions	1	2
Punts–average	9–41.3	4–40.3
Fumbles–lost	2–2	2–1
Penalties–yards	3–25	4–40

== Individual statistics ==
Rushing

- Drake: Baer - 11 carries for 36 yards
- Drake: Rooker - 12 carries for 38 yards
- Drake: Tarazewich 3 rushes for 14 yards
- Arizona: Wolgast - 22 rushes for 133 yards
- Arizona: Carillo 7 rushes for 22 yards
- Arizona: Hall 15 rushes for 37 yards
- Arizona: Carpenter 6 rushes for 37 yards
- Arizona: Hodges 2 rushes for 49 yards

Passing

- Drake: Handke 3-of-4 for 30 yards
- Arizona: Wolgast 4-of-15 for 31 yards

Receiving

- Drake: Bienemann 2 catches for 10 yards
- Drake: Bunting 1 catches for 20 yards
- Arizona: Petersen - 1 catch for 7 yards
- Arizona: Woodburn - 1 catch for 9 yards
- Arizona: Ackerman - 1 catch for 11 yards
- Arizona: Spillsbury - 1 catch for 4 yards
