= 1948 Pacific Tigers football team =

American college football season

1948 Pacific Tigers football

Grape Bowl, T 35–35 vs. Hardin–Simmons
- Conference: California Collegiate Athletic Association
- Record: 7–1–2 (4–1 CCAA)
- Head coach: Larry Siemering (2nd season)
- Home stadium: Baxter Stadium, Grape Bowl

1948 California Collegiate Athletic Association football standings
	Conf.					Overall
Team	W		L		T	W		L		T
San Jose State $	5	–	0	–	0	9	–	3	–	0
Pacific (CA)	4	–	1	–	0	7	–	1	–	2
Santa Barbara	2	–	3	–	0	6	–	5	–	0
Fresno State	2	–	3	–	0	3	–	6	–	1
San Diego State	1	–	4	–	0	4	–	7	–	0
Cal Poly	1	–	4	–	0	3	–	5	–	0
$ – Conference champion

The 1948 Pacific Tigers football team was an American football team that represented the College of the Pacific—now known as the University of the Pacific—as a member of the California Collegiate Athletic Association (CCAA) during the 1948 college football season. In their second season under head coach Larry Siemering, the Tigers compiled an overall record of 7–1–2 with a mark 4–1 in conference play, placing second in the CCAA. They outscored all opponents by a combined total of 356 to 147. At the end of the season, the Tigers were invited to the Grape Bowl in Lodi, California, where they tied Hardin–Simmons, 35–35.

Pacific was ranked at No. 67 in the final Litkenhous Difference by Score System ratings for 1948.

== Schedule ==
Date	Opponent	Site	Result	Attendance	Source
September 25	Cal Poly	Baxter Stadium; Stockton, CA	W 33–13	10,000	
October 2	Loyola (CA)*	Baxter Stadium; Stockton, CA	T 14–14	10,500	
October 9	at San Diego State	Aztec Bowl; San Diego, CA	W 41–14	9,000	
October 16	Portland*	Baxter Stadium; Stockton, CA	W 61–15		
October 30	San Jose State^{†}	Grape Bowl; Lodi, CA (rivalry)	L 7–14		
November 6	at Montana*	Dornblaser Field; Missoula, MT	W 32–14		
November 13	at San Francisco*	Kezar Stadium; San Francisco, CA	W 32–14	10,000	
November 20	Santa Barbara	Baxter Stadium; Stockton, CA	W 46–14		
November 25	at Fresno State	Ratcliffe Stadium; Fresno, CA	W 55–0	6,487	
December 11	Hardin–Simmons*	Grape Bowl; Lodi, CA (Grape Bowl)	T 35–35	12,000	
*Non-conference game; ^{†}Homecoming
