= Grape Bowl =

Cover of 1947 Official Program

The Grape Bowl was a postseason college football bowl game played in 1947 and 1948. It was held at the Grape Bowl stadium, in Lodi, California.

Both games featured the College of the Pacific (now University of the Pacific), who defeated Utah State in 1947, and played Hardin–Simmons to a tie in 1948. Like some other postseason match-ups of the era, such as the Glass Bowl and the Optimist Bowl, results are listed in NCAA records, but the games were not considered NCAA-sanctioned bowls.

== Game results ==
Season	Date Played	Winning Team		Losing Team		Attendance (est.)
1947	December 13, 1947	Pacific (CA)	35	Utah State	21	12,000
1948	December 11, 1948	Hardin–Simmons	35	Pacific (CA)	35	10,000

=== 1947: Pacific 35, Utah State 21 ===
Scoring summary

Quarter	Time	Drive			Team	Scoring information	Score	
Quarter	Time	Plays	Yards	TOP	Team	Scoring information	USU	COP
1			72		COP	Harry Kane 1-yard touchdown run, Wayne Hardin kick good	0	7
1					COP	Fumble recovery returned 99 yards for touchdown by Bruce Orvis, Wayne Hardin kick good	0	14
2			55		COP	Eddie LeBaron 1-yard touchdown run, Wayne Hardin kick good	0	21
2			50		COP	John Rohde 14-yard touchdown reception from Eddie LeBaron, Wayne Hardin kick good	0	28
3			40		USU	Ernie Groll 4-yard touchdown run, Buss Williams kick good	7	28
3					COP	Don Brown 53-yard touchdown run, Wayne Hardin kick good	7	35
3		4	19		USU	Tony Sutich 4-yard touchdown run, Tony Sutich kick good	14	35
4					USU	Interception returned 42 yards for touchdown by Ernie Groll, Buss Williams kick good	21	35
"TOP" = time of possession. For other American football terms, see Glossary of American football.							21	35

=== 1948: Hardin–Simmons 35, Pacific 35 ===
Scoring summary

Quarter	Time	Drive			Team	Scoring information	Score	
Quarter	Time	Plays	Yards	TOP	Team	Scoring information	HSU	COP
1		9	70		HSU	Wilton Davis 5-yard touchdown run, Paul Bailey kick good	7	0
2		3	6		HSU	Wilton Davis 2-yard touchdown run, Paul Bailey kick good	14	0
2		4	21		HSU	Bob McChesney 18-yard touchdown reception from John Ford, Paul Bailey kick good	21	0
3		13	82		COP	Don Hardy 18-yard touchdown run, Bill McFarland kick good	21	7
3		2			HSU	Bob McChesney 45-yard touchdown reception from John Ford, Paul Bailey kick good	28	7
3		10	65		COP	Phil Ortiz 16-yard touchdown reception from Eddie LeBaron, Bill McFarland kick good	28	14
3		6	25		COP	Jim Price 1-yard touchdown run, Bill McFarland kick good	28	21
4					COP	Don Hardy 22-yard touchdown run, Bill McFarland kick good	28	28
4					COP	Don Hardy 27-yard touchdown run, Bill McFarland kick good	28	35
4	0:55	5	20		HSU	Bob McChesney 3-yard touchdown reception from John Ford, Paul Bailey kick good	35	35
"TOP" = time of possession. For other American football terms, see Glossary of American football.							35	35

== LeBaron-Celeri game ==
While the Grape Bowl game did not continue past 1948, a game following the 1949 season was also held at the same venue, between senior players from Pacific and Cal. Organized to showcase quarterbacks Eddie LeBaron of Pacific and Bob Celeri of Cal, the game drew over 20,000 fans, and was also called the "Cash Bowl", as proceeds from the game were divided among players. The game was played on February 12, 1950, and resulted in a 7–6 victory for Pacific, the difference being a missed extra point.

== See also ==
- List of college bowl games
