= 1948 Fresno State Bulldogs football team =

American college football season

1948 Fresno State Bulldogs football
- Conference: California Collegiate Athletic Association
- Record: 3–6–1 (2–3 CCAA)
- Head coach: Ken Gleason (2nd season)
- Home stadium: Ratcliffe Stadium

1948 California Collegiate Athletic Association football standings
	Conf.					Overall
Team	W		L		T	W		L		T
San Jose State $	5	–	0	–	0	9	–	3	–	0
Pacific (CA)	4	–	1	–	0	7	–	1	–	2
Santa Barbara	2	–	3	–	0	6	–	5	–	0
Fresno State	2	–	3	–	0	3	–	6	–	1
San Diego State	1	–	4	–	0	4	–	7	–	0
Cal Poly	1	–	4	–	0	3	–	5	–	0
$ – Conference champion

The 1948 Fresno State Bulldogs football team represented Fresno State Normal School—now known as California State University, Fresno—during the 1948 college football season. Fresno State competed in the California Collegiate Athletic Association (CCAA). The team was led by second-year head coach Ken Gleason and played home games at Ratcliffe Stadium on the campus of Fresno City College in Fresno, California. They finished the season with a record of three wins, six losses and one tie (3–6–1, 2–3 CCAA). The Bulldogs were outscored 108–267 for the season.

Fresno State was ranked at No. 236 in the final Litkenhous Difference by Score System ratings for 1948.

== Schedule ==
Date	Opponent	Site	Result	Attendance	Source
September 25	at Portland	Multnomah Stadium; Portland, OR	T 6–6		
October 2	Santa Clara*	Ratcliffe Stadium; Fresno, CA	L 7–45	12,081	
October 9	at Cal Poly*	Mustang Stadium; San Luis Obispo, CA	L 14–26		
October 16	Santa Barbara	Ratcliffe Stadium; Fresno, CA	W 28–7	5,218	
October 23	at Pepperdine*	Wrigley Field; Los Angeles, CA	L 13–14	5,000	
October 30	New Mexico*	Ratcliffe Stadium; Fresno, CA	W 20–14	4,698–6,000	
November 6	at San Diego State	Aztec Bowl; San Diego, CA (rivalry)	W 7–6	5,000	
November 11	Nevada*	Ratcliffe Stadium; Fresno, CA	L 7–53	11,554	
November 19	at San Jose State*	Spartan Stadium; San Jose, CA (rivalry)	L 6–41	10,000	
November 25	Pacific (CA)	Ratcliffe Stadium; Fresno, CA	L 0–55	6,487	
*Non-conference game
