= 1948 Texas Tech Red Raiders football team =

American college football season

1948 Texas Tech Red Raiders football

Border champion
- Conference: Border Conference
- Record: 7–3 (5–0 Border)
- Head coach: Dell Morgan (8th season)
- Offensive scheme: Single-wing
- Base defense: 6–2
- Home stadium: Jones Stadium

1948 Border Conference football standings
	Conf.					Overall
Team	W		L		T	W		L		T
Texas Tech $	5	–	0	–	0	7	–	3	–	0
Texas Mines	4	–	1	–	1	8	–	2	–	1
Arizona	3	–	2	–	0	6	–	5	–	0
Arizona State	3	–	2	–	0	5	–	5	–	0
Hardin–Simmons	3	–	2	–	1	6	–	2	–	3
West Texas State	2	–	3	–	0	6	–	5	–	0
Arizona State–Flagstaff	1	–	2	–	0	4	–	5	–	0
New Mexico	1	–	6	–	0	2	–	9	–	0
New Mexico A&M	0	–	4	–	0	3	–	7	–	0
$ – Conference champion

The 1948 Texas Tech Red Raiders football team represented Texas Technological College—now known as Texas Tech University—as a member of the Border Conference during the 1948 college football season. Led by eighth-year head coach Dell Morgan, the Red Raiders compiled an overall record of 7–3 with a mark of 5–0 in conference play, winning the Border Conference title for the second consecutive season.

Texas Tech was ranked at No. 56 in the final Litkenhous Difference by Score System ratings for 1948.

== Schedule ==
The Red Raiders were invited to play a game in Mexico City on December 11. The proposition was discussed at length by the Texas Tech athletic council, who eventually voted against it due to the team's ten-game schedule.

Date	Opponent	Site	Result	Attendance	Source
September 18	West Texas State	Jones Stadium; Lubbock, TX	W 19–0	16,000	
September 25	vs. Texas A&M*	Alamo Stadium; San Antonio, TX (rivalry)	W 20–14	20,860	
October 2	at SMU*	Ownby Stadium; University Park, TX	L 6–41	23,000	
October 9	at Tulsa*	Skelly Stadium; Tulsa, OK	W 41–20	11,226–11,277	
October 16	at No. 19 Baylor*	Municipal Stadium; Waco, TX (rivalry)	L 0–13	9,000	
October 23	at Arizona	Arizona Stadium; Tucson, AZ	W 31–0	17,000	
October 30	Rice*^{†}	Jones Stadium; Lubbock, TX	L 7–14	19,000	
November 6	Texas Mines	Jones Stadium; Lubbock, TX	W 46–16	14,000	
November 20	New Mexico	Jones Stadium; Lubbock, TX	W 14–7	11,500	
November 27	at Hardin–Simmons	Fair Park Stadium; Abilene, TX	W 28–20	11,000	
*Non-conference game; ^{†}Homecoming; Rankings from AP Poll released prior to the game
