= 1948 San Diego State Aztecs football team =

American college football season

1948 San Diego State Aztecs football
- Conference: California Collegiate Athletic Association
- Record: 4–7 (1–4 CCAA)
- Head coach: Bill Schutte (2nd season)
- Home stadium: Aztec Bowl

1948 California Collegiate Athletic Association football standings
	Conf.					Overall
Team	W		L		T	W		L		T
San Jose State $	5	–	0	–	0	9	–	3	–	0
Pacific (CA)	4	–	1	–	0	7	–	1	–	2
Santa Barbara	2	–	3	–	0	6	–	5	–	0
Fresno State	2	–	3	–	0	3	–	6	–	1
San Diego State	1	–	4	–	0	4	–	7	–	0
Cal Poly	1	–	4	–	0	3	–	5	–	0
$ – Conference champion

The 1948 San Diego State Aztecs football team represented San Diego State College (Note: San Diego State University was known as San Diego State College from 1935 to 1971.) during the 1948 college football season.

San Diego State competed in the California Collegiate Athletic Association (CCAA). The team was led by second-year head coach Bill Schutte, and played home games at both Aztec Bowl and Balboa Stadium. They finished the season with four wins and seven losses (4–7, 1–4 CCAA). Overall, the team was outscored by its opponents 158–190 for the season.

San Diego State was ranked at No. 194 in the final Litkenhous Difference by Score System ratings for 1948.

== Schedule ==
Date	Opponent	Site	Result	Attendance	Source
September 18	at BYU*	Cougar Stadium (Note: This stadium is the predecessor to the current Cougar Stadium on the BYU campus, which was opened for the 1964 season); Provo, UT	L 6–14	11,000	
September 25	at Arizona*	Arizona Stadium; Tucson, AZ	L 6–14	14,000	
October 2	Redlands*	Aztec Bowl; San Diego, CA	W 38–7	9,000	
October 9	Pacific (CA)	Aztec Bowl; San Diego, CA	L 14–41	9,000	
October 16	Pepperdine*	Balboa Stadium; San Diego, CA	W 7–6	18,000	
October 30	Loyola (CA)*	Aztec Bowl; San Diego, CA	L 6–20	7,500	
November 6	Fresno State	Aztec Bowl; San Diego, CA (rivalry)	L 6–7	5,000	
November 12	at San Jose State	Spartan Stadium; San Jose, CA	L 13–21	7,500	
November 20	at Cal Poly	Mustang Stadium; San Luis Obispo, CA	W 28–14	4,500	
November 27	at Santa Barbara	La Playa Stadium; Santa Barbara, CA	L 6–27	4,500	
December 4	Utah State*^{†}	Aztec Bowl; San Diego, CA	W 28–19	5,000	
*Non-conference game; ^{†}Homecoming
