= 1948 BYU Cougars football team =

American college football season

1948 BYU Cougars football
- Conference: Skyline Six Conference
- Record: 5–6 (1–3 Skyline Six)
- Head coach: Eddie Kimball (8th season)

1948 Skyline Six Conference football standings
	Conf.					Overall
Team	W		L		T	W		L		T
Utah $	5	–	0	–	0	8	–	1	–	1
Colorado A&M	4	–	1	–	0	8	–	3	–	0
Denver	2	–	2	–	0	4	–	5	–	1
Utah State	2	–	3	–	0	5	–	6	–	0
BYU	1	–	3	–	0	5	–	6	–	0
Wyoming	0	–	5	–	0	4	–	5	–	0
$ – Conference champion

The 1948 BYU Cougars football team was an American football team that represented Brigham Young University (BYU) as a member of the Skyline Six Conference during the 1948 college football season. In their eighth and final season under head coach Eddie Kimball, the Cougars compiled an overall record of 5–6 with a mark of 1–3 against conference opponents, finished fifth in the Skyline Six, and were outscored by a total of 199 to 135.

BYU was ranked at No. 157 in the final Litkenhous Difference by Score System ratings for 1948.

== Schedule ==
Date	Opponent	Site	Result	Attendance	Source
September 18	San Diego State*	Cougar Stadium; Provo, UT	W 14–6	11,000	
September 24	Pepperdine*	Cougar Stadium; Provo, UT	W 13–0		
October 1	Pacific Fleet*	Cougar Stadium; Provo, UT	L 7–9	6,500	
October 9	Utah	Cougar Stadium; Provo, UT (rivalry)	L 0–30	14,000	
October 15	at Texas Mines*	Kidd Field; El Paso, TX	L 20–34	8,500	
October 23	at Utah State	Aggie Stadium; Logan, UT (rivalry)	L 20–7	12,000	
October 30	Montana*^{†}	Cougar Stadium; Provo, UT	W 26–20		
November 5	at San Jose State*	Spartan Stadium; San Jose, CA	L 6–21		
November 13	at Colorado A&M	Colorado Field; Fort Collins, CO	L 0–20		
November 20	Wyoming	Cougar Stadium; Provo, UT	W 15–14	15,000	
November 26	at Arizona State*	Goodwin Stadium; Tempe, AZ	W 27–25		
*Non-conference game; ^{†}Homecoming
