= 1948 Santa Barbara Gauchos football team =

American college football season

1948 Santa Barbara Gauchos football

Potato Bowl, W 46–7 vs. Willamette
- Conference: California Collegiate Athletic Association
- Record: 6–5 (2–3 CCAA)
- Head coach: Stan Williamson (4th season)
- Home stadium: La Playa Stadium

1948 California Collegiate Athletic Association football standings
	Conf.					Overall
Team	W		L		T	W		L		T
San Jose State $	5	–	0	–	0	9	–	3	–	0
Pacific (CA)	4	–	1	–	0	7	–	1	–	2
Santa Barbara	2	–	3	–	0	6	–	5	–	0
Fresno State	2	–	3	–	0	3	–	6	–	1
San Diego State	1	–	4	–	0	4	–	7	–	0
Cal Poly	1	–	4	–	0	3	–	5	–	0
$ – Conference champion

The 1948 UC Santa Barbara Gauchos football team represented Santa Barbara College (Note: University of California, Santa Barbara was known as Santa Barbara College of the University of California from 1944 to 1957.) during the 1948 college football season.

Santa Barbara competed in the California Collegiate Athletic Association (CCAA). The team was led by fourth-year head coach Stan Williamson and played home games at La Playa Stadium in Santa Barbara, California. They finished the season with a record of six wins and five losses (6–5, 2–3 CCAA). At the end of the season, the Gauchos played in the first Potato Bowl, in Bakersfield, California. (Note: The Potato Bowl was played as a charity benefit in Bakersfield from 1948–1967. In later years, instead of four-year institutions it was played between Junior College teams. This Bowl game has no relation to the Famous Idaho Potato Bowl which was founded in 1997.)

== Schedule ==
Date	Opponent	Site	Result	Attendance	Source
September 18	at Oregon*	Hayward Field; Eugene, OR	L 7–55		
September 25	at Whittier*	Hadley Field; Whittier, CA	W 21–19		
October 1	Pomona*	La Playa Stadium; Santa Barbara, CA	W 32–14		
October 9	Occidental*	La Playa Stadium; Santa Barbara, CA	L 7–8		
October 16	at Fresno State	Ratcliffe Stadium; Fresno, CA	L 7–28		
October 22	San Jose State	La Playa Stadium; Santa Barbara, CA	L 13–43		
November 6	vs. Cal Aggies (Note: The game against the Cal Aggies was part of an "All-UC Doubleheader" that was held annually from 1948 to 1963. The other game of the double-header was California vs. UCLA. The games were always held at the home stadium of either Cal or UCLA.)*	California Memorial Stadium; Berkeley, CA	W 27–6		
November 11	Cal Poly*	La Playa Stadium; Santa Barbara, CA	W 35–19		
November 20	at Pacific (CA)	Baxter Stadium; Stockton, CA	L 14–46		
November 27	San Diego State	La Playa Stadium; Santa Barbara, CA	W 27–6	4,500	
December 4	vs. Willamette	Griffith Stadium; Bakersfield, CA (Potato Bowl)	W 46–7		
*Non-conference game

== Team players in the NFL ==
No Santa Barbara Gaucho players were selected in the 1949 NFL draft. The following finished their Santa Barbara Gauchos career in 1948, were not drafted, but played in the NFL.

Player	Position	First NFL team
Sam Cathcart	Defensive back, halfback	1949 San Francisco 49ers
