= 1948 New Mexico A&M Aggies football team =

American college football season

1948 New Mexico A&M Aggies football
- Conference: Border Conference
- Record: 3–7 (0–4 Border)
- Head coach: Vaughn Corley (1st season)
- Home stadium: Quesenberry Field

1948 Border Conference football standings
	Conf.					Overall
Team	W		L		T	W		L		T
Texas Tech $	5	–	0	–	0	7	–	3	–	0
Texas Mines	4	–	1	–	1	8	–	2	–	1
Arizona	3	–	2	–	0	6	–	5	–	0
Arizona State	3	–	2	–	0	5	–	5	–	0
Hardin–Simmons	3	–	2	–	1	6	–	2	–	3
West Texas State	2	–	3	–	0	6	–	5	–	0
Arizona State–Flagstaff	1	–	2	–	0	4	–	5	–	0
New Mexico	1	–	6	–	0	2	–	9	–	0
New Mexico A&M	0	–	4	–	0	3	–	7	–	0
$ – Conference champion

The 1948 New Mexico A&M Aggies football team was an American football team that represented New Mexico College of Agriculture and Mechanical Arts (now known as New Mexico State University) as a member of the Border Conference during the 1948 college football season. In their first year under head coach Vaughn Corley, the Aggies compiled a 3–7 record (0–4 against conference opponents), finished last in the conference, and were outscored by a total of 391 to 138. The team played home games on Quesenberry Field in Las Cruces, New Mexico.

== Schedule ==
Date	Opponent	Site	Result	Attendance	Source
September 18	at Arizona State–Flagstaff	Skidmore Field; Flagstaff, AZ	L 7–13		
September 25	at Colorado A&M*	Colorado Field; Fort Collins, CO	L 6–41	5,000	
October 2	Fort Bliss*	Quesenberry Field; Las Cruces, NM	W 33–12	7,500	
October 9	at New Mexico	Zimmerman Field; Albuquerque, NM (rivalry)	L 0–61		
October 16	at Sul Ross*	Jackson Field; Alpine, TX	L 12–47		
October 29	New Mexico Highlands*	Quesenberry Field; Las Cruces, NM	W 26–0	2,500	
November 5	Arizona State	Quesenberry Field; Las Cruces, NM	L 7–52	2,500	
November 12	Fort Hays State*	Quesenberry Field; Las Cruces, NM	W 27–12		
November 20	Western State (CO)*	Quesenberry Field; Las Cruces, NM	L 13–61		
November 25	at Texas Mines	Kidd Field; El Paso, TX (rivalry)	L 7–92	8,000	
*Non-conference game
