= 1948 San Jose State Spartans football team =

American college football season

1948 San Jose State Spartans football

CCAA champion
- Conference: California Collegiate Athletic Association
- Record: 9–3 (5–0 CCAA)
- Head coach: Wilbur V. Hubbard (3rd season)
- Home stadium: Spartan Stadium

1948 California Collegiate Athletic Association football standings
	Conf.					Overall
Team	W		L		T	W		L		T
San Jose State $	5	–	0	–	0	9	–	3	–	0
Pacific (CA)	4	–	1	–	0	7	–	1	–	2
Santa Barbara	2	–	3	–	0	6	–	5	–	0
Fresno State	2	–	3	–	0	3	–	6	–	1
San Diego State	1	–	4	–	0	4	–	7	–	0
Cal Poly	1	–	4	–	0	3	–	5	–	0
$ – Conference champion

The 1948 San Jose State Spartans football team represented San Jose State College (Note: San Jose State University was known as San Jose State College from 1935 to 1971.) during the 1948 college football season.

San Jose State competed in the California Collegiate Athletic Association. The team was led by head coach Wilbur V. Hubbard, in his third year, and played home games at Spartan Stadium in San Jose, California. They finished the season as champion of the CCAA with a record of nine wins and three losses (9–3, 5–0 CCAA).

San Jose State was ranked at No. 81 in the final Litkenhous Difference by Score System ratings for 1948.

== Schedule ==
Date	Opponent	Site	Result	Attendance	Source
September 18	at Stanford*	Stanford Stadium; Stanford, CA (rivalry)	L 20–26		
September 24	Nevada*	Spartan Stadium; San Jose, CA	L 0–39		
October 1	Puget Sound*	Spartan Stadium; San Jose, CA	W 20–7		
October 9	at Pepperdine*	Wrigley Field; Los Angeles, CA	W 61–6	5,100	
October 16	at Cal Poly	Mustang Stadium; San Luis Obispo, CA	W 47–7		
October 22	at Santa Barbara	La Playa Stadium; Santa Barbara, CA	W 43–13		
October 30	at Pacific (CA)	Grape Bowl; Lodi, CA (rivalry)	W 14–7		
November 5	BYU*	Spartan Stadium; San Jose, CA	W 21–6		
November 12	San Diego State	Spartan Stadium; San Jose, CA	W 21–13	7,500	
November 19	Fresno State	Spartan Stadium; San Jose, CA (rivalry)	W 41–6	10,000	
November 26	Saint Mary's*	Spartan Stadium; San Jose, CA	L 14–19	14,000	
December 4	University of Mexico*	Spartan Stadium; San Jose, CA	W 71–19		
*Non-conference game

== Team players in the NFL ==
The following San Jose State players were selected in the 1949 NFL draft.

Player	Position	Round	Overall	NFL team
Bob Pifferini	Center	15	142	Detroit Lions
