= 1948 Cal Poly San Dimas Broncos football team =

American college football season

1948 Cal Poly San Dimas Broncos football
- Conference: Independent
- Record: 6–4
- Head coach: Duane Whitehead (1st season)

1948 Western non-major college football independents records
	Conf.			Overall
Team	W	L	T	W		L		T
Hawaii		–		7	–	4	–	1
Idaho State		–		6	–	1	–	1
Cal Poly San Dimas		–		6	–	4	–	0
Pepperdine		–		4	–	5	–	0
Loyola (CA)		–		3	–	5	–	1
La Verne		–		3	–	5	–	0

The 1948 Cal Poly San Dimas Broncos football team represented the Cal Poly Voorhis Unit—now known as California State Polytechnic University, Pomona—as an independent during the 1948 college football season. Led by first-year head coach Duane Whitehead, Cal Poly San Dimas compiled a record of 6–4. The team outscored its opponents 159 to 158 for the season.

Whitee was originally slated to assist Bob Ashton in coaching the team, but was elevated to head coach when Ashton left for Excelsior High School in Norwalk, California.

== Schedule ==
Date	Opponent	Site	Result
September 17	at Santa Ana	Santa Ana Stadium; Santa Ana, CA	L 0–14
September 25	Napa	Covina High School; Covina, CA	W 14–6
October 2	Pierce	Covina High School; Covina, CA	W 20–6
October 9	at Whittier	Hadley Field; Whittier, CA	L 7–20
October 16	at Occidental	D.W. Patterson Field; Los Angeles, CA	L 0–40
October 23	Palomar	Escondido, CA?	W 42–14
October 29	at Humboldt State	Redwood Bowl; Arcata, CA	L 6–26
November 5	at Mt. San Antonio	Mt. San Antonio College; Walnut, CA	W 27–14
November 11	at Palo Verde	Blythe, CA	W 18–12
November 19	La Verne	Covina High School; Covina, CA	W 25–6
