= 1948 Cal Poly Mustangs football team =

American college football season

1948 Cal Poly Mustangs football
- Conference: California Collegiate Athletic Association
- Record: 3–5 (1–4 CCAA)
- Head coach: Chuck Pavelko (1st season)
- Home stadium: Mustang Stadium

1948 California Collegiate Athletic Association football standings
	Conf.					Overall
Team	W		L		T	W		L		T
San Jose State $	5	–	0	–	0	9	–	3	–	0
Pacific (CA)	4	–	1	–	0	7	–	1	–	2
Santa Barbara	2	–	3	–	0	6	–	5	–	0
Fresno State	2	–	3	–	0	3	–	6	–	1
San Diego State	1	–	4	–	0	4	–	7	–	0
Cal Poly	1	–	4	–	0	3	–	5	–	0
$ – Conference champion

The 1948 Cal Poly Mustangs football team represented California Polytechnic State College—now known as California Polytechnic State University, San Luis Obispo—as a member of the California Collegiate Athletic Association (CCAA) during the 1948 college football season. Led by first-year head coach Chuck Pavelko, Cal Poly compiled an overall record of 3–5 with a mark of 1–4 in conference play, tying for fifth place in the CCAA. The Mustangs played home games at Mustang Stadium in San Luis Obispo, California.

== Schedule ==
Date	Opponent	Site	Result	Attendance	Source
September 25	at Pacific (CA)	Baxter Stadium; Stockton, CA	L 13–33	10,000	
October 2	Caltech*	Mustang Stadium; San Luis Obispo, CA	W 27–6		
October 9	Fresno State	Mustang Stadium; San Luis Obispo, CA	W 26–14		
October 16	San Jose State	Mustang Stadium; San Luis Obispo, CA	L 7–47		
October 30	Whittier*	Mustang Stadium; San Luis Obispo, CA	L 13–26		
November 5	at San Francisco State*	Cox Stadium; San Francisco, CA	W 40–0		
November 11	at Santa Barbara	La Playa Stadium; Santa Barbara, CA	L 19–35		
November 20	San Diego State	Mustang Stadium; San Luis Obispo, CA	L 14–28	4,500	
*Non-conference game
