= 1948 Hawaii Rainbows football team =

American college football season

1948 Hawaii Rainbows football

Pineapple Bowl, L 27–47 vs. Oregon State
- Conference: Independent
- Record: 7–4–1
- Head coach: Tom Kaulukukui (4th season)
- Home stadium: Honolulu Stadium

1948 Western non-major college football independents records
	Conf.			Overall
Team	W	L	T	W		L		T
Hawaii		–		7	–	4	–	1
Idaho State		–		6	–	1	–	1
Cal Poly San Dimas		–		6	–	4	–	0
Pepperdine		–		4	–	5	–	0
Loyola (CA)		–		3	–	5	–	1
La Verne		–		3	–	5	–	0

The 1948 Hawaii Rainbows football team represented the University of Hawaiʻi as an independent during the 1948 college football season. In their fourth season under head coach Tom Kaulukukui, the Rainbows compiled a 7–4–1 record.

Hawaii was ranked at No. 162 in the final Litkenhous Difference by Score System ratings for 1948.

== Schedule ==
Date	Opponent	Site	Result	Attendance	Source
September 7	Kauai Broncos	Honolulu Stadium; Honolulu, Territory of Hawaii	W 20–0	2,000	
September 17	Cardinals	Honolulu Stadium; Honolulu, Territory of Hawaii	W 47–0	7,000	
September 22	Islanders	Honolulu Stadium; Honolulu, Territory of Hawaii	T 20–20	2,000	
October 2	at Michigan State	Macklin Stadium; East Lansing, MI	L 21–68	30,281	
October 9	at Redlands	Redlands, CA	W 55–0		
October 21	Olympic	Honolulu Stadium; Honolulu, Territory of Hawaii	W 52–12	2,000	
November 3	Leilehua Vandals	Honolulu Stadium; Honolulu, Territory of Hawaii	W 53–7	18,000	
November 11	Ford Island	Honolulu Stadium; Honolulu, Territory of Hawaii	W 39–6	14,000	
November 24	Leilehua Vandals	Honolulu Stadium; Honolulu, Territory of Hawaii	W 14–7		
December 4	Texas Mines	Honolulu Stadium; Honolulu, Territory of Hawaii	L 6–49	14,000	
December 17	Nevada	Honolulu Stadium; Honolulu, Territory of Hawaii	L 12–73	11,000	
January 1, 1949	Oregon State	Honolulu Stadium; Honolulu, Territory of Hawaii (Pineapple Bowl)	L 27–47	14,000	
