= 1948 Drake Bulldogs football team =

American college football season

1948 Drake Bulldogs football

Salad Bowl champion

Salad Bowl, W 14–13 vs. Arizona
- Conference: Missouri Valley Conference
- Record: 7–3 (1–1 MVC)
- Head coach: Albert Kawal (2nd season)
- Home stadium: Drake Stadium

1948 Missouri Valley Conference football standings
	Conf.					Overall
Team	W		L		T	W		L		T
Oklahoma A&M $	2	–	0	–	0	6	–	4	–	0
Wichita	2	–	1	–	1	5	–	4	–	1
Drake	1	–	1	–	0	7	–	3	–	0
Tulsa	0	–	1	–	1	0	–	9	–	1
Saint Louis	0	–	2	–	0	4	–	7	–	0
$ – Conference champion

The 1948 Drake Bulldogs football team was an American football team that represented Drake University as a member of the Missouri Valley Conference during the 1948 college football season. In its second season under head coach Albert Kawal, the team compiled a 7–3 record (1–1 against MVC opponents), finished third in the conference, defeated Arizona in the 1949 Salad Bowl, and outscored all opponents by a total of 199 to 105.

Drake was ranked at No. 93 in the final Litkenhous Difference by Score System ratings for 1948.

The team played its home games at Drake Stadium in Des Moines, Iowa.

== Schedule ==
Date	Time	Opponent	Site	Result	Attendance	Source
September 18		South Dakota State*	Drake Stadium; Des Moines, IA	W 47–0		
September 24	8:15 p.m.	Saint Louis	Drake Stadium; Des Moines, IA	W 14–0	10,000	
October 2		at Iowa State Teachers*	O. R. Latham FieldCedar Falls, IA (rivalry)	L 0–6		
October 8		Wichita	Drake Stadium; Des Moines, IA	L 20–21		
October 16		Bradley*	Drake Stadium; Des Moines, IA	W 17–14		
October 23		at Colorado A&M*	Colorado Field; Fort Collins, CO	W 31–29	11,000	
October 30		Emporia State*	Drake Stadium; Des Moines, IA	W 43–20		
November 6		at Iowa State*	Clyde Williams Field; Ames, IA	L 0–2	12,826	
November 13		New Mexico*	Drake Stadium; Des Moines, IA	W 13–0	7,000	
January 1, 1949		vs. Arizona*	Montgomery Stadium; Phoenix (Salad Bowl)	W 14–13	17,500	
*Non-conference game; All times are in Central time
