= 1948 Hardin–Simmons Cowboys football team =

American college football season

1948 Hardin–Simmons Cowboys football

Grape Bowl, T 35–35 at Pacific (CA) Shrine Bowl, W 40–12 vs. Ouachita Baptist Camellia Bowl, W 49–12 vs. Wichita
- Conference: Border Conference
- Record: 6–2–3 (3–2–1 Border)
- Head coach: Warren B. Woodson (5th season)
- Home stadium: Fair Park Stadium

1948 Border Conference football standings
	Conf.					Overall
Team	W		L		T	W		L		T
Texas Tech $	5	–	0	–	0	7	–	3	–	0
Texas Mines	4	–	1	–	1	8	–	2	–	1
Arizona	3	–	2	–	0	6	–	5	–	0
Arizona State	3	–	2	–	0	5	–	5	–	0
Hardin–Simmons	3	–	2	–	1	6	–	2	–	3
West Texas State	2	–	3	–	0	6	–	5	–	0
Arizona State–Flagstaff	1	–	2	–	0	4	–	5	–	0
New Mexico	1	–	6	–	0	2	–	9	–	0
New Mexico A&M	0	–	4	–	0	3	–	7	–	0
$ – Conference champion

The 1948 Hardin–Simmons Cowboys football team was an American football team that represented Hardin–Simmons University in the Border Conference during the 1948 college football season. In its fifth season under head coach Warren B. Woodson, the team compiled a 6–2–3 record (3–2–1 against conference opponents) and outscored all opponents by a total of 345 to 212.

Hardin-Simmons was ranked at No. 84 in the final Litkenhous Difference by Score System ratings for 1948.

== Schedule ==
Date	Opponent	Site	Result	Attendance	Source
September 25	at Cincinnati*	Nippert Stadium; Cincinnati, OH	T 7–7	22,000	
October 9	at Arizona	Arizona Stadium; Tucson, AZ	L 14–20	14,000	
October 16	at New Mexico	Zimmerman Field; Albuquerque, NM	W 28–19		
October 30	at Texas Mines	Kidd Field; El Paso, TX	T 27–27	14,000	
November 6	Oklahoma City*	Fair Park Stadium; Abilene, TX	W 34–21	4,000	
November 11	West Texas State	Fair Park Stadium; Abilene, TX	W 28–6	3,500	
November 20	Arizona State	Fair Park Stadium; Abilene, TX	W 63–25	4,500	
November 27	Texas Tech	Fair Park Stadium; Abilene, TX	L 20–28	12,000	
December 11	at Pacific (CA)*	Grape Bowl; Lodi, CA (Grape Bowl)	T 35–35	12,000	
December 18	vs. Ouachita Baptist*	War Memorial Stadium; Little Rock, AR (Shrine Bowl)	W 40–12	5,000	
December 30	vs. Wichita*	McNaspy Stadium; Lafayette, LA (Camellia Bowl)	W 49–12	< 5,000	
*Non-conference game
