= 1948 Marquette Hilltoppers football team =

American college football season

1948 Marquette Hilltoppers football
- Conference: Independent
- Record: 2–8
- Head coach: Frank Murray (18th season)
- Home stadium: Marquette Stadium

1948 Midwestern major college football independents records
	Conf.			Overall
Team	W	L	T	W		L		T
No. 2 Notre Dame		–		9	–	0	–	1
Michigan State		–		6	–	2	–	2
Detroit		–		6	–	3	–	0
Marquette		–		2	–	8	–	0
Rankings from AP Poll

The 1948 Marquette Hilltoppers football team was an American football team that represented Marquette University as an independent during the 1948 college football season. In its 18th season under head coach Frank Murray, the team compiled a 2–8 record and was outscored by a total of 212 to 127.

Marquette was ranked at No. 88 in the final Litkenhous Difference by Score System ratings for 1948.

The team played its home games at Marquette Stadium in Milwaukee.

== Schedule ==
Date	Opponent	Site	Result	Attendance	Source
September 25	at Iowa	Iowa Stadium; Iowa City, IA	L 12–14		
October 1	at Detroit	University of Detroit Stadium; Detroit, MI	L 6–34	20,741	
October 9	Saint Louis	Marquette Stadium; Milwaukee, MI	W 47–7	11,000	
October 16	at Pittsburgh	Pitt Stadium; Pittsburgh, PA	L 7–21	15,830	
October 23	Kentucky	Marquette Stadium; Milwaukee, MI	L 0–25	15,000	
October 30	at Purdue	Ross–Ade Stadium; West Lafayette, IN	L 9–14	32,000	
November 6	at No. 17 Michigan State	Macklin Stadium; East Lansing, MI	L 0–47	37,131	
November 13	at Wisconsin	Camp Randall Stadium; Madison, WI	L 0–26	45,000	
November 20	South Dakota	Marquette Stadium; Milwaukee, MI	W 32–0	6,000	
November 27	vs. Arizona	Montgomery Stadium; Phoenix, AZ	L 14–24	11,000	
Rankings from AP Poll released prior to the game
