= 1948 West Texas State Buffaloes football team =

American college football season

1948 West Texas State Buffaloes football
- Conference: Border Conference
- Record: 6–5 (2–3 Border)
- Head coach: Frank Kimbrough (2nd season)
- Home stadium: Buffalo Stadium

1948 Border Conference football standings
	Conf.					Overall
Team	W		L		T	W		L		T
Texas Tech $	5	–	0	–	0	7	–	3	–	0
Texas Mines	4	–	1	–	1	8	–	2	–	1
Arizona	3	–	2	–	0	6	–	5	–	0
Arizona State	3	–	2	–	0	5	–	5	–	0
Hardin–Simmons	3	–	2	–	1	6	–	2	–	3
West Texas State	2	–	3	–	0	6	–	5	–	0
Arizona State–Flagstaff	1	–	2	–	0	4	–	5	–	0
New Mexico	1	–	6	–	0	2	–	9	–	0
New Mexico A&M	0	–	4	–	0	3	–	7	–	0
$ – Conference champion

The 1948 West Texas State Buffaloes football team was an American football team that represented West Texas State College (now known as West Texas A&M University) in the Border Conference during the 1948 college football season. In its second season under head coach Frank Kimbrough, the team compiled a 6–5 record (2–3 against conference opponents) and outscored opponents by a total of 192 to 153.

West Texas was ranked at No. 126 in the final Litkenhous Difference by Score System ratings for 1948.

== Schedule ==
Date	Time	Opponent	Site	Result	Attendance	Source
September 11		Arizona State–Flagstaff	Buffalo Stadium; Canyon, TX	W 28–0		
September 18		at Texas Tech	Jones Stadium; Lubbock, TX	L 0–19	16,000	
September 25		Abilene Christian*	Buffalo Stadium; Canyon, TX	W 41–19		
October 2		North Texas State*	Buffalo Stadium; Canyon, TX	L 7–20		
October 9		at Texas Mines	Kidd Field; El Paso, TX	L 7–21	10,000	
October 16	8:00 p.m.	at Hardin*	Coyote Stadium; Wichita Falls, TX	W 28–7	4,500	
October 23	3:00 p.m.	vs. East Texas State*	Cotton Bowl; Dallas, TX	L 7–13	3,000	
October 30		Houston*^{†}	Buffalo Stadium; Canyon, TX	W 28–13	6,000	
November 11		at Hardin–Simmons	Fair Park Stadium; Abilene, TX	L 6–28	3,500	
November 27		New Mexico	Buffalo Stadium; Canyon, TX	W 19–0		
December 3		at Corpus Christi*	Buccaneer Field; Corpus Christi, TX	W 21–13	3,000	
*Non-conference game; ^{†}Homecoming; All times are in Central time
