= 1948 Arizona State–Flagstaff Lumberjacks football team =

American college football season

1948 Arizona State–Flagstaff Lumberjacks football
- Conference: Border Conference
- Record: 4–5 (2–3 Border)
- Head coach: Nick Ragus (2nd season)
- Home stadium: Skidmore Field

1948 Border Conference football standings
	Conf.					Overall
Team	W		L		T	W		L		T
Texas Tech $	5	–	0	–	0	7	–	3	–	0
Texas Mines	4	–	1	–	1	8	–	2	–	1
Arizona	3	–	2	–	0	6	–	5	–	0
Arizona State	3	–	2	–	0	5	–	5	–	0
Hardin–Simmons	3	–	2	–	1	6	–	2	–	3
West Texas State	2	–	3	–	0	6	–	5	–	0
Arizona State–Flagstaff	1	–	2	–	0	4	–	5	–	0
New Mexico	1	–	6	–	0	2	–	9	–	0
New Mexico A&M	0	–	4	–	0	3	–	7	–	0
$ – Conference champion

The 1948 Arizona State–Flagstaff Lumberjacks football team was an American football team that represented Arizona State Teachers College at Flagstaff (now known as Northern Arizona University) in the Border Conference during the 1948 college football season. In their second and final year under head coach Nick Ragus, the team compiled a 4–5 record (1–2 against conference opponents), was outscored by a total of 187 to 144, and finished in seventh place out of nine teams in the Border Conference. The team played its home games at Skidmore Field in Flagstaff, Arizona.

== Schedule ==
Date	Opponent	Site	Result	Attendance	Source
September 11	at West Texas State	Buffalo Stadium; Canyon, TX	L 0–28		
September 18	New Mexico A&M	Skidmore Field; Flagstaff, AZ	W 13–7		
October 2	San Pedro Athletic Club	Skidmore Field; Flagstaff, AZ	W 21–12		
October 16	at Arizona State	Goodwin Stadium; Tempe, AZ	L 0–40		
October 23	Redlands^{†}*	Skidmore Field; Flagstaff, AZ	W 25–7	5,000	
October 30	at Western State (CO)*	Gunnison, CO	L 6–26		
November 6	vs. La Verne*	Union High School field; Kingman, AZ	W 47–6		
November 13	Pepperdine*	Skidmore Field; Flagstaff, AZ	L 20–34	3,700	
November 27	at Whittier*	Hadley Field; Whittier, CA	L 12–27		
*Non-conference game; ^{†}Homecoming
