= 1949 Sun Bowl =

American college football game

- 15th Sun Bowl
West Virginia Mountaineers	Texas Mines Miners
(8–3)	(8–1–1)
Independent	Border Conference
21	12
Head coach: Dudley DeGroot	Head coach: Jack Curtice
	1	2	3	4	Total
West Virginia	0	7	14	0	21
Texas Mines	0	6	0	6	12
- Date: January 1, 1949
- Season: 1948
- Stadium: Kidd Field
- Location: El Paso, Texas
- Referee: Harry Phillips
- Attendance: 13,000

The 1949 Sun Bowl was a college football postseason bowl game between the Texas Mines Miners and the West Virginia Mountaineers.

== Background ==
Controversy surrounded this game before it was played. In late November, the independent Lafayette Leopards of Easton, Pennsylvania, were invited to play in the Sun Bowl against Texas Mines, the second-place team in the Border Conference, under the condition that their star halfback, David Showell, an African-American, did not play. Four days later, Lafayette rejected the bid. West Virginia was selected to play against the Miners. The Lafayette–Texas Mines contest that was not held is referred to as "The Greatest Game They Never Played", which was turned into a song.

This was the second bowl appearance for Texas Mines, and first since 1937, which was also in the Sun Bowl. This was West Virginia's first bowl game since 1938.

== Game summary ==
After a scoreless first quarter, the Miners struck first quickly on a Harvey Gabrel touchdown dive. The extra point was not converted, leaving it at 6–0. The Mountaineers soon responded when James Walthall threw a 25-yard pass to Clarence Cox, who ran into the end zone to give West Virginia a 7–6 lead at halftime. They struck back in the second half with two James Devonshire touchdown runs before the third quarter ended to make the lead 21–6. Texas Mines closed the score to 21–12 on a Fred Wendt 60-yard kickoff return, but did not score again as West Virginia won.

== Statistics ==
Statistics	West Virginia	Texas Mines
First downs	13	12
Rushing yards	183	245
Passing yards	122	57
Passes intercepted	1	0
Total offense	305	302
Fumbles–lost	1–0	4–4
Penalties–yards	6–50	3–25
Punts–average	9–27.0	5–42.5
Punt returns–yards	3–25	3–18
Kickoff returns–average	3–27	2–34

== Aftermath ==
This was the final Sun Bowl played with no MVP awarded. The following year, the C. M. Hendricks Most Valuable Player Trophy was awarded. West Virginia did not win a bowl game again until 1969. The Miners returned to the Sun Bowl the following year and won, while going to four Sun Bowls in the decade.
