= 1948 New Mexico Lobos football team =

American college football season

1948 New Mexico Lobos football
- Conference: Border Conference
- Record: 2–9 (1–6 Border)
- Head coach: Berl Huffman (2nd season)
- Home stadium: Zimmerman Field

1948 Border Conference football standings
	Conf.					Overall
Team	W		L		T	W		L		T
Texas Tech $	5	–	0	–	0	7	–	3	–	0
Texas Mines	4	–	1	–	1	8	–	2	–	1
Arizona	3	–	2	–	0	6	–	5	–	0
Arizona State	3	–	2	–	0	5	–	5	–	0
Hardin–Simmons	3	–	2	–	1	6	–	2	–	3
West Texas State	2	–	3	–	0	6	–	5	–	0
Arizona State–Flagstaff	1	–	2	–	0	4	–	5	–	0
New Mexico	1	–	6	–	0	2	–	9	–	0
New Mexico A&M	0	–	4	–	0	3	–	7	–	0
$ – Conference champion

The 1948 New Mexico Lobos football team represented the University of New Mexico in the Border Conference during the 1948 college football season. In their second season under head coach Berl Huffman, the Lobos compiled a 2–9 record (1–6 against conference opponents), finished eighth in the Border Conference, and were outscored by opponents by a total of 216 to 146.

New Mexico was ranked at No. 138 in the final Litkenhous Difference by Score System ratings for 1948.

== Schedule ==
Date	Opponent	Site	Result	Attendance	Source
September 25	at Colorado*	Folsom Field; Boulder, CO	W 9–6	16,000–16,125	
October 2	at Texas*	Memorial Stadium; Austin, TX	L 0–47	31,000	
October 9	New Mexico A&M	Zimmerman Field; Albuquerque, NM (rivalry)	W 61–0		
October 16	Hardin–Simmons	Zimmerman Field; Albuquerque, NM	L 19–28		
October 23	Texas Mines	Zimmerman Field; Albuquerque, NM	L 13–27		
October 30	at Fresno State*	Ratcliffe Stadium; Fresno, CA	L 14–20	4,698–6,000	
November 6	Arizona^{†}	Zimmerman Field; Albuquerque, NM (rivalry)	L 6–14	13,000	
November 13	at Drake*	Drake Stadium; Des Moines, IA	L 0–13	7,000	
November 20	at Texas Tech	Jones Stadium; Lubbock, TX	L 7–14	11,500	
November 27	at West Texas State	Buffalo Stadium; Canyon, TX	L 0–19		
December 14	at Arizona State	Goodwin Stadium; Tempe, AZ	L 17–28	10,000	
*Non-conference game; ^{†}Homecoming
