= 1948 Wyoming Cowboys football team =

American college football season

1948 Wyoming Cowboys football
- Conference: Skyline Six Conference
- Record: 4–5 (0–5 Skyline Six)
- Head coach: Bowden Wyatt (2nd season)
- Captain: George Waters
- Home stadium: Corbett Field

1948 Skyline Six Conference football standings
	Conf.					Overall
Team	W		L		T	W		L		T
Utah $	5	–	0	–	0	8	–	1	–	1
Colorado A&M	4	–	1	–	0	8	–	3	–	0
Denver	2	–	2	–	0	4	–	5	–	1
Utah State	2	–	3	–	0	5	–	6	–	0
BYU	1	–	3	–	0	5	–	6	–	0
Wyoming	0	–	5	–	0	4	–	5	–	0
$ – Conference champion

The 1948 Wyoming Cowboys football team represented the University of Wyoming in the Skyline Six Conference during the 1948 college football season. In their second season under head coach Bowden Wyatt, the Cowboys compiled a 4–5 record (0–5 against Skyline Six opponents), finished sixth in the conference, and outscored all opponents by a total of 270 to 145.

Eddie Talboom played in the backfield. He later became the first Wyoming player to be inducted into the College Football Hall of Fame. Head coach Bowden Wyatt was also inducted into the College Football Hall of Fame as a coach in 1997.

In the final Litkenhous Difference by Score System ratings for 1948, Wyoming was ranked at No. 95.

== Schedule ==
Date	Opponent	Site	Result	Attendance	Source
September 25	Colorado College*	Corbett Field; Laramie, WY	W 61–7		
October 2	Colorado State–Greeley*	Corbett Field; Laramie, WY	W 48–0		
October 9	Idaho State*	Corbett Field; Laramie, WY	W 40–13		
October 16	Colorado A&M	Corbett Field; Laramie, WY (rivalry)	L 20–21	8,000	
October 23	at Utah	Ute Stadium; Salt Lake City, UT	L 7–19	22,275	
October 30	at Utah State	Aggie Stadium; Logan, UT (rivalry)	L 34–45	7,000	
November 13	vs. Montana State*	Daylis Stadium; Billings, MT (Midland Roundtable Grid Classic)	W 46–12	5,000	
November 20	at BYU	Cougar Stadium; Provo, UT	L 14–15	15,000	
November 25	at Denver	Hilltop Stadium; Denver, CO	L 0–13	20,000	
*Non-conference game
