= 1948 Utah Utes football team =

American college football season

1948 Utah Utes football

Skyline Six champion
- Conference: Skyline Six Conference
- Record: 8–1–1 (5–0 Skyline Six)
- Head coach: Ike Armstrong (24th season)
- Home stadium: Ute Stadium

1948 Skyline Six Conference football standings
	Conf.					Overall
Team	W		L		T	W		L		T
Utah $	5	–	0	–	0	8	–	1	–	1
Colorado A&M	4	–	1	–	0	8	–	3	–	0
Denver	2	–	2	–	0	4	–	5	–	1
Utah State	2	–	3	–	0	5	–	6	–	0
BYU	1	–	3	–	0	5	–	6	–	0
Wyoming	0	–	5	–	0	4	–	5	–	0
$ – Conference champion

The 1948 Utah Utes football team, or also commonly known as the Utah Redskins, was an American football team that represented the University of Utah as a member of the Skyline Six Conference during the 1948 college football season. In their 24th season under head coach Ike Armstrong, the Utes compiled an overall record of 8–1–1 with a mark of 5–0 against conference opponents, winning the Skyline Six title.

Utah was ranked at No. 48 in the final Litkenhous Difference by Score System ratings for 1948.

== Schedule ==
Date	Opponent	Site	Result	Attendance	Source
September 17	at USC*	Los Angeles Memorial Coliseum; Los Angeles, CA	L 0–27	55,211	
September 25	Idaho*	Ute Stadium; Salt Lake City, UT	W 21–6	18,099	
October 2	Arizona*	Ute Stadium; Salt Lake City, UT	W 47–14	21,355	
October 9	at BYU	Cougar Stadium; Provo, UT (rivalry)	W 30–0	14,000	
October 16	at Denver	Hilltop Stadium; Denver, CO	W 17–0	13,572	
October 23	Wyoming	Ute Stadium; Salt Lake City, UT	W 19–7	22,275	
October 30	Colorado*^{†}	Ute Stadium; Salt Lake City, UT (rivalry)	W 14–12	17,003	
November 6	at Colorado A&M	Colorado Field; Fort Collins, CO	W 12–3	10,500	
November 13	at Oregon State*	Bell Field; Corvallis, OR	T 20–20	8,000	
November 25	Utah State	Ute Stadium; Salt Lake City, UT (rivalry)	W 41–7	23,109	
*Non-conference game; ^{†}Homecoming

== After the season ==
=== NFL draft ===
Utah had two players selected in the 1949 NFL draft.

Player	Position	Round	Pick	NFL team
Bob Summerhays	Back	4	34	Green Bay Packers
Gil Tobler	Back	22	212	Detroit Lions
