= 1948 Loyola Lions football team =

American college football season

1948 Loyola Lions football
- Conference: Independent
- Record: 3–5–1
- Head coach: Bill Sargent (2nd season)
- Home stadium: Gilmore Stadium; Rose Bowl

1948 Western non-major college football independents records
| | Conf. | | | Overall |
| Team | W | L | T | W | | L | | T |
|---|---|---|---|---|---|---|---|---|
| Hawaii | | – | | 7 | – | 4 | – | 1 |
| Idaho State | | – | | 6 | – | 1 | – | 1 |
| Cal Poly San Dimas | | – | | 6 | – | 4 | – | 0 |
| Pepperdine | | – | | 4 | – | 5 | – | 0 |
| Loyola (CA) | | – | | 3 | – | 5 | – | 1 |
| La Verne | | – | | 3 | – | 5 | – | 0 |

The 1948 Loyola Lions football team was an American football team that represented Loyola University of Los Angeles (now known as Loyola Marymount University) as an independent during the 1948 college football season. In their second and final season under head coach Bill Sargent, the Lions compiled a 3–5–1 record and were outscored, 199 to 151.

Loyola was ranked at No. 169 in the final Litkenhous Difference by Score System ratings for 1948.

== Schedule ==
| Date | Opponent | Site | Result | Attendance | Source |
|---|---|---|---|---|---|
| September 19 | Saint Mary's | Rose Bowl; Pasadena, CA | L 7–32 | 22,102 | |
| September 24 | Redlands | Gilmore Stadium; Los Angeles, CA | W 57–12 | 9,000 | |
| October 2 | Pacific | Baxter Stadium; Stockton, CA | T 14–14 | 10,500 | |
| October 15 | Santa Clara | Gilmore Stadium; Los Angeles, CA | L 0–47 | 10,000 | |
| October 22 | Pomona | Gilmore Stadium; Los Angeles, CA | L 32–34 | | |
| October 30 | at San Diego State | Aztec Bowl; San Diego, CA | W 20–6 | 7,500 | |
| November 5 | San Francisco | Gilmore Stadium; Los Angeles, CA | L 0–28 | 5,785 | |
| November 12 | Arizona State | Gilmore Stadium; Los Angeles, CA | W 16–12 | 4,000 | |
| November 27 | Pepperdine | Gilmore Stadium; Los Angeles, CA | L 13–14 | 7,500 | |
