= 1948 Utah State Aggies football team =

American college football season

1948 Utah State Aggies football
- Conference: Skyline Six Conference
- Record: 5–6 (2–3 Skyline Six)
- Head coach: Dick Romney (29th season)
- Home stadium: Aggie Stadium

1948 Skyline Six Conference football standings
	Conf.					Overall
Team	W		L		T	W		L		T
Utah $	5	–	0	–	0	8	–	1	–	1
Colorado A&M	4	–	1	–	0	8	–	3	–	0
Denver	2	–	2	–	0	4	–	5	–	1
Utah State	2	–	3	–	0	5	–	6	–	0
BYU	1	–	3	–	0	5	–	6	–	0
Wyoming	0	–	5	–	0	4	–	5	–	0
$ – Conference champion

The 1948 Utah State Aggies football team was an American football team that represented Utah State Agricultural College in the Skyline Six Conference during the 1948 college football season. In their 29th season under head coach Dick Romney, the Aggies compiled a 5–6 record (2–3 against MSC opponents), finished fourth in the MSC, and were outscored by a total of 238 to 196.

Utah State was ranked at No. 133 in the final Litkenhous Difference by Score System ratings for 1948.

== Schedule ==
Date	Opponent	Site	Result	Attendance	Source
September 17	Montana State*	Aggie Stadium; Logan, UT	W 31–6		
September 25	at Montana*	Dornblaser Field; Missoula, MT	W 18–7		
October 2	Colorado A&M	Aggie Stadium; Logan, UT	L 7–9	10,000	
October 9	Arizona State*	Aggie Stadium; Logan, UT	W 22–17		
October 16	at Wichita*	Veterans Field; Wichita, KS	L 7–20	9,000	
October 23	BYU^{†}	Aggie Stadium; Logan, UT (rivalry)	W 20–7	12,000	
October 30	Wyoming	Aggie Stadium; Logan, UT (rivalry)	W 45–34	7,000	
November 6	at Colorado*	Folsom Field; Boulder, CO	L 14–28	10,322–15,000	
November 13	at Denver	Hilltop Stadium; Denver, CO	L 6–41	13,297	
November 25	at Utah	Ute Stadium; Salt Lake City, UT (rivalry)	L 7–41	23,109	
December 4	at San Diego State*	Aztec Bowl; San Diego, CA	L 19–28	4,500	
*Non-conference game; ^{†}Homecoming
