= 1948 Michigan State Spartans football team =

American college football season

1948 Michigan State Spartans football
- Conference: Independent

Ranking
- AP: No. 14
- Record: 6–2–2
- Head coach: Biggie Munn (2nd season)
- MVP: Lynn Chandnois
- Captain: Robert B. McCurry
- Home stadium: Macklin Field Stadium

1948 Midwestern major college football independents records
	Conf.			Overall
Team	W	L	T	W		L		T
No. 2 Notre Dame		–		9	–	0	–	1
Michigan State		–		6	–	2	–	2
Detroit		–		6	–	3	–	0
Marquette		–		2	–	8	–	0
Rankings from AP Poll

The 1948 Michigan State Spartans football team was an American football team that represented Michigan State College (now known as Michigan State University) as an independent the 1948 college football season. In their second season under head coach Biggie Munn, the Spartans compiled a 6–2–2 record, outscored opponents by a total of 359 to 130, and were ranked No. 14 in the final AP poll. The Spartans were also ranked at No. 3 in the final Litkenhous Difference by Score System ratings for 1948.

The 1948 Spartans sustained their two losses in annual rivalry games against Notre Dame (26–7) and national champion Michigan (13–7). In intersectional play, the Spartans beat Hawaii (68–21), Arizona (61–7), Oregon State (46–21), and Washington State (40–0), and tied with Penn State (14–14) and Santa Clara (21–21).

The Spartans' offense was led by left halfback George Guerre and right halfback Lynn Chandnois. Guerre tallied 734 rushing yards on 118 carries, and Chadnois gained 681 yards on 91 carries. Two Spartans received All-America recognition: guard Don Mason (Associated Press, second team), and end Warren Huey (Football Writers Association of America, second team).

The team played its home games at the expanded Macklin Field Stadium in East Lansing, Michigan. The stadium was enlarged to a seating capacity of 50,410 and increased from 46 to 66 rows along the sidelines and from 11 to 47 rows in the end zones.

== Schedule ==
Date	Opponent	Rank	Site	Result	Attendance	Source
September 25	Michigan		Macklin Field Stadium; East Lansing, MI (rivalry)	L 7–13	51,511	
October 2	Hawaii		Macklin Field Stadium; East Lansing, MI	W 68–21	30,281	
October 9	at No. 1 Notre Dame		Notre Dame Stadium; Notre Dame, IN (rivalry)	L 7–26	58,126	
October 16	Arizona^{†}		Macklin Field Stadium; East Lansing, MI	W 61–7	36,616	
October 23	at No. 8 Penn State	No. 19	New Beaver Field; State College, PA (rivalry)	T 14–14	24,579	
October 30	at Oregon State	No. 17	Bell Field; Corvallis, OR	W 46–21	12,000	
November 6	Marquette	No. 17	Macklin Field Stadium; East Lansing, MI	W 47–0	37,131	
November 13	at Iowa State	No. 12	Clyde Williams Field; Ames, IA	W 48–7	7,847	
November 20	Washington State	No. 12	Macklin Field Stadium; East Lansing, MI	W 40–0	36,313	
November 27	at Santa Clara	No. 11	Kezar Stadium; San Francisco, CA	T 21–21	20,000	
^{†}Homecoming; Rankings from AP Poll released prior to the game

== Rankings ==
Ranking movements Legend: ██ Increase in ranking ██ Decrease in ranking — = Not ranked ( ) = First-place votes
	Week								
Poll	1	2	3	4	5	6	7	8	Final
AP	—	—	19	17	17	12 (1)	12 (2)	11 (3)	14 (2)

== Game summaries ==
=== Michigan ===
Week 1: Michigan at Michigan State

Team	1	2	3	4	Total
• Michigan	7	0	0	6	13
Michigan St.	0	0	7	0	7

- Date: September 25, 1948
- Location: Macklin Stadium
  East Lansing, MI
- Game attendance: 51,511
- Referee: George W. Rennix

Michigan State opened it 1948 season with a 13–7 loss to Michigan in East Lansing. The game was also the first to be played at Michigan State's new Macklin Stadium. Early in the opening quarter, fullback Don Peterson threw a 40-yard touchdown pass to Dick Rifenburg. Peterson kicked the extra point, and Michigan's 7–0 lead held through halftime. Michigan State tied the game in the third quarter on a disputed play in which a pass from Lynn Chandnois was caught by both Hank Minarik and Wally Teninga. The official ruled that possession went to the offensive player as a touchdown. Peterson scored the winning touchdown for Michigan on a five-yard run in the fourth quarter, but failed to convert the extra point attempt. Late in the fourth quarter, Michigan State drove the ball to Michigan's two-yard line. With time running out, Teninga intercepted a Michigan State pass. Michigan's offense was held to 106 rushing yards and 117 passing yards in the game.

A sluggish offensive performance and a narrow margin of victory over a team the Wolverines had beaten 55–0 in 1947 led some in the media to question Oosterbaan's selection as Michigan's new coach. The New York Times opined that Michigan's performance "lacked most of the precision which it had last year under H. O. Crisler." H. G. Salsinger of The Detroit News wrote:

"Michigan's first game under Oosterbaan . . . was not impressive. They lacked the spark that distinguished them through the 1947 season. The offense was dull and poorly directed . . . . The critics who had judged Oosterbaan's football coaching skills on his record as a basketball coach considered their appraisal justified. The future looked dark for Michigan and Oosterbaan."

Opinions of Oosterbaan changed as Michigan shut out ranked opponents in each of the next three games.
