= 1948 Texas Mines Miners football team =

American college football season

1948 Texas Mines Miners football

Sun Bowl, L 12–21 vs. West Virginia
- Conference: Border Conference
- Record: 8–2–1 (4–1–1 Border)
- Head coach: Jack Curtice (3rd season)
- Home stadium: Kidd Field

1948 Border Conference football standings
	Conf.					Overall
Team	W		L		T	W		L		T
Texas Tech $	5	–	0	–	0	7	–	3	–	0
Texas Mines	4	–	1	–	1	8	–	2	–	1
Arizona	3	–	2	–	0	6	–	5	–	0
Arizona State	3	–	2	–	0	5	–	5	–	0
Hardin–Simmons	3	–	2	–	1	6	–	2	–	3
West Texas State	2	–	3	–	0	6	–	5	–	0
Arizona State–Flagstaff	1	–	2	–	0	4	–	5	–	0
New Mexico	1	–	6	–	0	2	–	9	–	0
New Mexico A&M	0	–	4	–	0	3	–	7	–	0
$ – Conference champion

The 1948 Texas Mines Miners football team was an American football team that represented Texas School of Mines (now known as University of Texas at El Paso) as a member of the Border Conference during the 1948 college football season. In its third season under head coach Jack Curtice, the team compiled an 8–2–1 record (4–1–1 against Border Conference opponents), finished second in the conference, defeated West Virginia in the 1949 Sun Bowl, and outscored all opponents by a total of 361 to 182.

Texas Mines was ranked at No. 73 in the final Litkenhous Difference by Score System ratings for 1948.

== Schedule ==
Date	Opponent	Site	Result	Attendance	Source
September 18	vs. McMurry*	Fly Field; Odessa, TX	W 33–14	5,500	
September 25	Houston*	Kidd Field; El Paso, TX	W 35–7	6,000	
October 9	West Texas State	Kidd Field; El Paso, TX	W 21–7	10,000	
October 15	BYU*	Kidd Field; El Paso, TX	W 34–20	8,500	
October 23	at New Mexico	Zimmerman Field; Albuquerque, NM	W 27–13		
October 30	Hardin–Simmons^{†}	Kidd Field; El Paso, TX	T 27–27	14,000	
November 6	at Texas Tech	Jones Stadium; Lubbock, TX	L 6–46	14,000	
November 13	at Arizona	Arizona Stadium; Tucson, AZ	W 25–14	13,500	
November 25	New Mexico A&M	Kidd Field; El Paso, TX	W 92–7	8,000	
December 4	at Hawaii*	Honolulu Stadium; Honolulu, HI	W 49–6	14,000	
January 1, 1949	vs. West Virginia*	Kidd Field; El Paso, TX (Sun Bowl)	L 12–21	13,000	
*Non-conference game; ^{†}Homecoming
