= 1949 Raisin Bowl (January) =

Occidental Tigers	Colorado A&M Aggies
(8–0)	(8–2)
21	20
Head coach: Roy Dennis	Head coach: Bob Davis
	1	2	3	4	Total
Occidental	0	0	7	14	21
Colorado A&M	0	13	0	7	20
- Date: January 1, 1949
- Season: 1948
- Stadium: Ratcliffe Stadium
- Location: Fresno, California
- Attendance: 10,000

The 1949 Raisin Bowl was held on January 1, 1949 at Ratcliffe Stadium in Fresno, California. This was the fourth annual Raisin Bowl and the last one played in January. The Occidental Tigers defeated the Colorado A&M Aggies by a score of 21–20. The game was the highest scoring of the five Raisin Bowls played.

== Scoring summary ==
The first quarter was scoreless, but the action happened as soon as the second quarter began. Bob Hainlen attempted a field goal for the Aggies which was good, but it was nullified by a penalty. On the next play, he faked a field goal attempt, throwing the ball to a wide open Keith Thompson for a touchdown. Frank Faucett's kick was blocked, however, leaving it at 6-0. With 35 seconds remaining, Eddie Hanna ran for a 71-yard touchdown run to make it 13-0 before halftime. In the second half, the Tigers came roaring back. Don Ross connected on a touchdown pass to Bill Pearson from 17 yards out to narrow the lead with 7:16 in the 3rd quarter. Early into the fourth quarter, Ross threw another touchdown pass to Pearson to take the lead for Occidental. On the second play after the kickoff, Eddie Hanna took the ball and ran 79 yards down the sideline to make it 20-14. Less than two minutes later, Ross connected on a 69-yard pass to Bob Levin for a touchdown, which proved to be the winning points as Occidental held on for the rest of the game.

== Aftermath ==
On the way home, the Aggies were forced to stop the plane-ride back to Colorado in Rock Springs, Wyoming for refueling. Due to the high altitude weighing the plane down, 19 of the players (and Athletic Director Harry Hughes) had to be left behind, alongside the equipment. They took a train ride back to Fort Collins, while the other players flew home. They did not return to a bowl game for 41 years, with that game also being played in California.
