= 1948 Colorado A&M Aggies football team =

American college football season

1948 Colorado A&M Aggies football

Raisin Bowl, L 20–21 vs. Occidental
- Conference: Skyline Six Conference
- Record: 8–3 (4–1 Skyline Six)
- Head coach: Bob Davis (2nd season)
- Home stadium: Colorado Field

1948 Skyline Six Conference football standings
	Conf.					Overall
Team	W		L		T	W		L		T
Utah $	5	–	0	–	0	8	–	1	–	1
Colorado A&M	4	–	1	–	0	8	–	3	–	0
Denver	2	–	2	–	0	4	–	5	–	1
Utah State	2	–	3	–	0	5	–	6	–	0
BYU	1	–	3	–	0	5	–	6	–	0
Wyoming	0	–	5	–	0	4	–	5	–	0
$ – Conference champion

The 1948 Colorado A&M Aggies football team represented Colorado State College of Agriculture and Mechanic Arts in the Skyline Six Conference during the 1948 college football season. In their second season under head coach Bob Davis, the Aggies compiled an 8–3 record (4–1 against MSC opponents), lost to Occidental in the 1949 Raisin Bowl, and outscored all opponents by a total of 244 to 138.

Eight Colorado Agricultural players received all-conference honors in 1948: fullback Don Mullison, fullback Thurman "Fum" McGraw, end George Jones, halfback Eddie Hana, guard Dale Dodrill, halfback Ollie Woods, quarterback Bob Hainlen, and tackle Don Hoch. Bob Davis was also named Skyline Conference Coach of the Year.

In the final Litkenhous Difference by Score System ratings for 1948, Colorado A&M was ranked at No. 97.

== Schedule ==
Date	Opponent	Site	Result	Attendance	Source
September 18	Colorado College*	Colorado Field; Fort Collins, CO	W 25–6	7,500	
September 25	New Mexico A&M*	Colorado Field; Fort Collins, CO	W 41–6	5,000	
October 2	at Utah State	Romney Stadium; Logan, UT	W 9–7	10,000	
October 9	at Denver	Hilltop Stadium; Denver, CO	W 14–10	23,000	
October 16	at Wyoming	Corbett Field; Laramie, WY (rivalry)	W 21–20	8,000	
October 23	Drake*^{†}	Colorado Field; Fort Collins, CO	L 29–31	11,000	
October 30	at Colorado Mines*	Brooks Field; Golden, CO	W 33–0	5,000	
November 6	Utah	Colorado Field; Fort Collins, CO	L 3–12	10,500	
November 13	BYU	Colorado Field; Fort Collins, CO	W 20–0		
November 20	at Colorado*	Folsom Field; Boulder, CO (rivalry)	W 29–25	13,998–18,000	
January 1, 1949	vs. Occidental*	Ratcliffe Stadium; Fresno, CA (Raisin Bowl)	L 20–21	10,000	
*Non-conference game; ^{†}Homecoming

== After the season ==
=== NFL draft ===
The following Aggie was selected in the 1949 NFL draft following the season.

Round	Pick	Player	Position	NFL club
19	188	Bob Hainlen	Back	Washington Redskins
