= Tom Bedore =

American football player (born 1924)

No. 46
- Position: End

Personal information
- Born: November 14, 1924; Faust, New York
- Died: August 27, 2012 (aged 87)

Career information
- College: Pepperdine University

Career history
- 1944: Washington Redskins
- Stats at Pro Football Reference

Raymond Thomas Bedore (November 14, 1924 – August 27, 2012), better known as Tom Bedore, was an American football end in the National Football League for the Washington Redskins. He was born in Faust, New York on November 14, 1924, and attended Pepperdine University. Bedore died on August 27, 2012, at the age of 87.
