= Shrine Bowl =

Postseason football bowl game

The Shrine Bowl was a postseason college football bowl game. The first game was played on December 18, 1948, at War Memorial Stadium in Little Rock, Arkansas, between Hardin–Simmons University and Ouachita Baptist College. The 1949 edition was held in Carbondale, Illinois, as the Indiana State Sycamores faced the Southern Illinois Salukis.

== Game result ==
Date	Winner		Loser		Location
December 18, 1948	Hardin–Simmons	41	Ouachita Baptist	12	Little Rock, Arkansas
November 26, 1949	Southern Illinois	41	Indiana State	14	Carbondale, Illinois

A series of games sponsored by the Shriners as a charity event in Honolulu in December 1941 and referred to by some as the Shrine Bowl was interrupted by the Japanese attack on Pearl Harbor. The Willamette University Bearcats and the San Jose State University Spartans travelled to Hawaii to play against each other and the University of Hawaii Rainbow Warriors. The Willamette team lost to the Hawaiians in the opening game on Saturday, December 6, but other games were cancelled when the U.S. Navy base at Pearl Harbor was attacked on December 7, 1941. The teams were among the first civilians evacuated in a convoy to San Francisco a couple of weeks later.

== See also ==
- List of college bowl games
