= 1948 college football season =

American college football season

- First AP No. 1 of season: Notre Dame
- Number of bowls: 14
- Champion: Michigan (AP)
- Heisman: Doak Walker (halfback, SMU)

The 1948 college football season finished with SMU halfback Doak Walker as the Heisman Trophy winner and six teams in contention for the national championship:

1. Bennie Oosterbaan's Michigan compiled a 9–0 record, defeated six ranked opponents, and was the consensus national champion, receiving 192 of 333 first-place votes in the final AP poll. It was Michigan's second consecutive undefeated season, extending the program's winning streak to 23 games.
2. Frank Leahy's Notre Dame Fighting Irish compiled a 9–0–1 record and had a 21-game winning streak dating back to the 1946 season before playing a 14–14 tie with USC in the final game of the 1948 season. Notre Dame was ranked No. 2 in the final AP Poll, receiving 97 of 333 first-place votes, with the same record as Michigan due to the final poll being taken prior to their season-ending tie.
3. Carl Snavely's No. 3 North Carolina Tar Heels, led by Heisman Trophy runner-up Charlie Justice, were undefeated in the regular season (9–0–1) but lost to Oklahoma in the 1949 Sugar Bowl.
4. Pappy Waldorf's No. 4 California Golden Bears, led by Jackie Jensen who finished fourth in the 1948 Heisman Trophy voting, were undefeated in the regular season (10–0), but lost to Northwestern in the 1949 Rose Bowl.
5. Bud Wilkinson's No. 5 Oklahoma Sooners compiled a 10–1 record, including a victory over No. 3 North Carolina in the 1949 Sugar Bowl.
6. Earl Blaik's No. 6 Army Cadets finished the season undefeated (8–0–1). They won the first eight games of the season and were ranked No. 3 in the AP Poll before playing Navy to a tie in the annual Army–Navy Game.

Eight other teams finished the season undefeated and untied: Southern (12–0, black college national champion); Clemson (11–0, SoCon and Gator Bowl champion, AP No. 11); Bloomsburg (9–0, PSTCC champion); Heidelberg (9–0, OAC champion); Occidental (9–0 SCC and Raisin Bowl champion); Alma (8–0 MIAA champion); and Wesleyan (8–0, third consecutive perfect season); Michigan Tech (7–0, independent).

Air travel to away games (as opposed to rail travel) became increasingly popular with college football programs in the late 1940s.

The NCAA began permitting the use of small 1-inch rubber "tees" (not the same tee used for kickoffs) for extra point and field goal attempts beginning this year; they were outlawed in 1989.

== Conference and program changes ==
=== Conference changes ===
- One conferences began play in 1948:
  - Ohio Valley Conference – an active NCAA Division I FCS conference; began play with six teams from Kentucky and Indiana.
- One conference played its final season in 1948:
  - Dakota-Iowa Athletic Conference – conference active since the 1946 season
- Two conferences changed their names prior to the season:
  - After the Big Six Conference, still officially known as the Missouri Valley Intercollegiate Athletic Association, added Colorado, the conference's unofficial name became the Big Seven Conference.
  - The Washington Intercollegiate Conference changed its name to the Evergreen Conference, the name it would retain until the conference's demise after the 1984 season.

=== Membership changes ===
School	1947 conference	1948 conference
Bradley Braves	Independent	Missouri Valley
Centenary Gentlemen	LIC	Dropped program
Colorado Buffaloes	Skyline (Mountain States)	Big Seven (MVIAA)
Eastern Kentucky State Colonels	KIAC	Ohio Valley
Evansville Purple Aces	Independent	Ohio Valley
Louisville Cardinals	KIAC	Ohio Valley
Morehead State Eagles	KIAC	Ohio Valley
Murray State Racers	KIAC	Ohio Valley
Western Kentucky State Hilltoppers	KIAC	Ohio Valley

== Season chronology ==
=== September ===
The Associated Press did not poll the writers until the fourth week of the season. Among the five teams that had been ranked highest in 1947 (Notre Dame, Michigan, SMU, Penn State, and Texas), all but Penn State began play on September 25. Notre Dame edged Purdue 28–27, Michigan won at Michigan State, 13–7, and SMU won at Pittsburgh, 33–14. The Texas Longhorns lost at North Carolina, 34–7. Northwestern beat UCLA, in Los Angeles, 19–0. In Baltimore, California beat Navy, 21–7. Army beat visiting Villanova 28–0.

=== October ===
October 2: In Pittsburgh, Notre Dame shut out Pitt, 40–0, while in Dallas, SMU defeated Texas Tech 41–6. Penn State beat Bucknell 35–0, Michigan beat Oregon 14–0. North Carolina won at Georgia 21–14. Army beat Lafayette 54–7. Northwestern beat Purdue 21–0. When the first poll was issued, Notre Dame had fewer first place votes than North Carolina (50 vs. 55), but ten more points overall (1,200 to 1,190) Northwestern was third, followed by SMU and Army. Though unbeaten, Michigan was ranked 7th, after Georgia Tech.

October 9: No. 1 Notre Dame beat Michigan State 26–7. No. 2 North Carolina won at Wake Forest, 28–6, and was ranked first in the next poll. No. 3 Northwestern beat No. 8 Minnesota 19–16. No. 4 SMU lost at Missouri, 20–14. No. 5 Army won at Illinois, 26–21. No. 7 Michigan, which had won at No. 15 Purdue, 40–0, rose to 4th.

October 16: No. 1 North Carolina beat N.C. State 14–0, but dropped to third in the next poll. No. 2 Notre Dame won at Nebraska 44–13. In Ann Arbor, Michigan, No. 3 Northwestern faced Big Nine rival No. 4 Michigan, and the home team Wolverines won 28–0. No. 5 Army defeated Harvard 20–7. Michigan moved up to first place in the next poll, and No. 6 California (which beat Oregon State 42–0) moved to No. 4, with Northwestern dropping out of the Top Five.

October 23: In Minneapolis, No. 1 Michigan beat No. 13 Minnesota 27–14, and No. 2 Notre Dame won at Iowa 27–12. No. 3 North Carolina beat visiting LSU 34–7. In Seattle, No. 4 California blanked Washington 21–0, and No. 5 Army won at No. 12 Cornell 27–6. The top five remained the same in the next poll.

October 30: No. 1 Michigan beat Illinois 28–20, while in Baltimore, No. 2 Notre Dame beat Navy 41–7. No. 3 North Carolina won at Tennessee 14–7. In Los Angeles, No. 4 California beat USC, 13–7. No. 5 Army beat Virginia Tech 49–7. In the next poll, Notre Dame was ranked at the new number one, followed by Michigan, North Carolina, Army, and California.

=== November ===
November 6: No. 1 Notre Dame won at Indiana 42–6. No. 2 Michigan beat visiting Navy 35–0. No. 3 North Carolina was tied by William & Mary, 7–7. No. 4 Army defeated Stanford at Yankee Stadium in New York, 43–0, while No. 5 California beat visiting UCLA 28–13. Michigan was elevated to No. 1 in the next poll, followed by Notre Dame, Army, and California. No. 14 Penn State, which had shut out No. 7 Pennsylvania in Philadelphia 13–0, was moved up to No. 5.

November 13: No. 1 Michigan beat Indiana 54–0. No. 2 Notre Dame beat No. 8 Northwestern 12–7. No. 3 Army won at No. 17 Pennsylvania 26–20. No. 4 California beat Washington State 44–14. No. 5 Penn State beat Temple 47–0, but still dropped in the next poll. It switched spots with No. 6 North Carolina, which moved up after a win at Maryland 49–20.

November 20: No. 1 Michigan closed its season with a 13–3 win at No. 18 Ohio State. No. 2 Notre Dame and No. 3 Army were both idle. No. 4 California beat Stanford 7–6. No. 5 North Carolina beat Duke 20–0. The next poll switched North Carolina to No. 4 and California to No. 5, with the top three remaining the same.

November 27: No. 1 Michigan, which had completed its season, had 105 of 190 first place votes. No. 2 Notre Dame defeated Washington 46–0. The annual Army–Navy Game in Philadelphia pitted unbeaten (8–0–0) and No. 3 Army against winless (0–8–0) Navy, and 102,000 fans turned out to watch the mismatch, including President Truman. It was a surprise when the Midshipmen scored first, but Army went ahead 21–14 after three quarters. In the fourth quarter, Navy pushed the Cadets back to their own goal line, and took the punt at midfield. In six plays, Navy drove down to the four yard line, and Bill Hawkins crashed into the end zone to make it 21–20. Roger Drew added the point after to ruin Army's perfect record, 21–21. No. 4 North Carolina won at Virginia 34–12, and No. 5 California had finished its season. The final poll was released on November 29, although some colleges had not completed their schedules. Michigan, Notre Dame, North Carolina, and California were the top four, with Oklahoma (which had won its last nine games in a row after a narrow season-opening loss to Santa Clara) at No. 5.

On December 4, No. 2 Notre Dame's perfect record was compromised in Los Angeles with a 14–14 tie against unranked USC.

== Conference standings ==
=== Major conference standings ===
1948 Big Nine Conference football standings
	Conf.					Overall
Team	W		L		T	W		L		T
No. 1 Michigan $	6	–	0	–	0	9	–	0	–	0
No. 7 Northwestern	5	–	1	–	0	8	–	2	–	0
No. 16 Minnesota	5	–	2	–	0	7	–	2	–	0
Ohio State	3	–	3	–	0	6	–	3	–	0
Iowa	2	–	4	–	0	4	–	5	–	0
Purdue	2	–	4	–	0	3	–	6	–	0
Indiana	2	–	4	–	0	2	–	7	–	0
Illinois	2	–	5	–	0	3	–	6	–	0
Wisconsin	1	–	5	–	0	2	–	7	–	0
$ – Conference champion; Rankings from AP Poll

1948 Big Seven Conference football standings
	Conf.					Overall
Team	W		L		T	W		L		T
No. 5 Oklahoma $	5	–	0	–	0	10	–	1	–	0
Missouri	5	–	1	–	0	8	–	3	–	0
Kansas	4	–	2	–	0	7	–	3	–	0
Colorado	2	–	3	–	0	3	–	6	–	0
Iowa State	2	–	4	–	0	4	–	6	–	0
Nebraska	2	–	4	–	0	2	–	8	–	0
Kansas State	0	–	6	–	0	1	–	9	–	0
$ – Conference champion; Rankings from AP Poll

1948 Border Conference football standings
	Conf.					Overall
Team	W		L		T	W		L		T
Texas Tech $	5	–	0	–	0	7	–	3	–	0
Texas Mines	4	–	1	–	1	8	–	2	–	1
Arizona	3	–	2	–	0	6	–	5	–	0
Arizona State	3	–	2	–	0	5	–	5	–	0
Hardin–Simmons	3	–	2	–	1	6	–	2	–	3
West Texas State	2	–	3	–	0	6	–	5	–	0
Arizona State–Flagstaff	1	–	2	–	0	4	–	5	–	0
New Mexico	1	–	6	–	0	2	–	9	–	0
New Mexico A&M	0	–	4	–	0	3	–	7	–	0
$ – Conference champion

1948 Ivy Group football standings
	Conf.					Overall
Team	W		L		T	W		L		T
No. 19 Cornell	4	–	0	–	0	8	–	1	–	0
Penn	3	–	1	–	0	5	–	3	–	0
Dartmouth	4	–	2	–	0	6	–	2	–	0
Brown	1	–	2	–	0	7	–	2	–	0
Princeton	3	–	3	–	0	4	–	4	–	0
Harvard	3	–	3	–	0	4	–	4	–	0
Yale	1	–	4	–	0	4	–	5	–	0
Columbia	1	–	5	–	0	4	–	5	–	0
Rankings from AP Poll

1948 Missouri Valley Conference football standings
	Conf.					Overall
Team	W		L		T	W		L		T
Oklahoma A&M $	2	–	0	–	0	6	–	4	–	0
Wichita	2	–	1	–	1	5	–	4	–	1
Drake	1	–	1	–	0	7	–	3	–	0
Tulsa	0	–	1	–	1	0	–	9	–	1
Saint Louis	0	–	2	–	0	4	–	7	–	0
$ – Conference champion

1948 Pacific Coast Conference football standings
	Conf.					Overall
Team	W		L		T	W		L		T
No. 4 California ^ +	6	–	0	–	0	10	–	1	–	0
No. 9 Oregon +	7	–	0	–	0	9	–	2	–	0
USC	4	–	2	–	0	6	–	3	–	1
Washington State	4	–	3	–	1	4	–	5	–	1
Stanford	3	–	4	–	0	4	–	6	–	0
Oregon State	2	–	3	–	2	5	–	4	–	3
Washington	2	–	5	–	1	2	–	7	–	1
UCLA	2	–	6	–	0	3	–	7	–	0
Idaho	1	–	5	–	0	3	–	6	–	0
Montana	0	–	3	–	0	3	–	7	–	0
+ – Conference co-champions; ^ – Selected as Rose Bowl representative; Rankings from AP Poll

1948 Skyline Six Conference football standings
	Conf.					Overall
Team	W		L		T	W		L		T
Utah $	5	–	0	–	0	8	–	1	–	1
Colorado A&M	4	–	1	–	0	8	–	3	–	0
Denver	2	–	2	–	0	4	–	5	–	1
Utah State	2	–	3	–	0	5	–	6	–	0
BYU	1	–	3	–	0	5	–	6	–	0
Wyoming	0	–	5	–	0	4	–	5	–	0
$ – Conference champion

1948 Southeastern Conference football standings
	Conf.					Overall
Team	W		L		T	W		L		T
No. 8 Georgia $	6	–	0	–	0	9	–	2	–	0
No. 15 Ole Miss	6	–	1	–	0	8	–	1	–	0
No. 13 Tulane	5	–	1	–	0	9	–	1	–	0
No. 12 Vanderbilt	4	–	2	–	1	8	–	2	–	1
Georgia Tech	4	–	3	–	0	7	–	3	–	0
Alabama	4	–	4	–	1	6	–	4	–	1
Mississippi State	3	–	3	–	0	4	–	4	–	1
Tennessee	2	–	3	–	1	4	–	4	–	2
Kentucky	1	–	3	–	1	5	–	3	–	2
Florida	1	–	5	–	0	5	–	5	–	0
LSU	1	–	5	–	0	3	–	7	–	0
Auburn	0	–	7	–	0	1	–	8	–	1
$ – Conference champion; Rankings from AP Poll

1948 Southern Conference football standings
	Conf.					Overall
Team	W		L		T	W		L		T
No. 11 Clemson $	5	–	0	–	0	11	–	0	–	0
No. 3 North Carolina	4	–	0	–	1	9	–	1	–	1
VMI	5	–	1	–	0	6	–	3	–	0
No. 17 William & Mary	5	–	1	–	1	7	–	2	–	2
No. 20 Wake Forest	5	–	2	–	0	6	–	4	–	0
Maryland	4	–	2	–	0	6	–	4	–	0
Duke	3	–	2	–	1	4	–	3	–	2
Richmond	3	–	3	–	1	5	–	3	–	2
Washington and Lee	2	–	2	–	0	4	–	6	–	0
Furman	2	–	4	–	0	2	–	6	–	1
George Washington	2	–	4	–	0	4	–	6	–	0
Davidson	2	–	5	–	0	3	–	5	–	1
South Carolina	1	–	3	–	0	3	–	5	–	0
NC State	1	–	4	–	1	3	–	6	–	1
VPI	0	–	6	–	1	0	–	8	–	1
The Citadel	0	–	5	–	0	2	–	7	–	0
$ – Conference champion; Rankings from AP Poll

1948 Southwest Conference football standings
	Conf.					Overall
Team	W		L		T	W		L		T
No. 10 SMU $	5	–	0	–	1	9	–	1	–	1
Texas	4	–	1	–	1	7	–	3	–	1
Baylor	3	–	2	–	1	6	–	3	–	2
Rice	3	–	2	–	1	5	–	4	–	1
Arkansas	2	–	4	–	0	5	–	5	–	0
TCU	1	–	4	–	1	4	–	5	–	1
Texas A&M	0	–	5	–	1	0	–	9	–	1
$ – Conference champion; Rankings from AP Poll

=== Major independents ===
1948 Eastern major college football independents records
	Conf.			Overall
Team	W	L	T	W		L		T
No. 6 Army		–		8	–	0	–	1
Penn State		–		7	–	1	–	1
Villanova		–		8	–	2	–	1
Boston University		–		6	–	2	–	0
Boston College		–		5	–	2	–	2
Pittsburgh		–		6	–	3	–	0
Holy Cross		–		5	–	5	–	0
Colgate		–		3	–	6	–	0
Fordham		–		3	–	6	–	0
NYU		–		3	–	6	–	0
Temple		–		2	–	6	–	1
Duquesne		–		2	–	7	–	0
Syracuse		–		1	–	8	–	0
Rankings from AP Poll

1948 Midwestern major college football independents records
	Conf.			Overall
Team	W	L	T	W		L		T
No. 2 Notre Dame		–		9	–	0	–	1
Michigan State		–		6	–	2	–	2
Detroit		–		6	–	3	–	0
Marquette		–		2	–	8	–	0
Rankings from AP Poll

1948 Southern major college football independents records
	Conf.			Overall
Team	W	L	T	W		L		T
West Virginia		–		9	–	3	–	0
Virginia		–		5	–	3	–	1
Chattanooga		–		4	–	5	–	0
Georgetown		–		3	–	4	–	1
Miami (FL)		–		4	–	6	–	0
Navy		–		0	–	8	–	1

1948 Western major college football independents records
	Conf.			Overall
Team	W	L	T	W		L		T
Nevada		–		9	–	2	–	0
Santa Clara		–		7	–	2	–	1
Saint Mary's		–		4	–	6	–	0
Portland		–		2	–	5	–	1
San Francisco		–		2	–	7	–	0

=== Minor conferences ===
Conference	Champion(s)	Record
Alabama Intercollegiate Conference	Jacksonville State	8–1-1
California Collegiate Athletic Association	San Jose State	5–0
Colored Intercollegiate Athletic Association	West Virginia State	5–1
Central Intercollegiate Athletic Conference	Kansas State Teachers (Emporia State)	5–0
College Conference of Illinois	Illinois Wesleyan	5–0
Dakota-Iowa Athletic Conference	Buena Vista	3–0–1
Evergreen Conference	Eastern Washington College; Puget Sound	5–1
Far Western Conference	Chico State College; Southern Oregon College	3–1
Iowa Intercollegiate Athletic Conference	Dubuque	5–0
Kansas Collegiate Athletic Conference	Ottawa (KS)	6–0
Lone Star Conference	Southwest Texas State Teachers	6–0
Michigan Intercollegiate Athletic Association	Alma	5–0
Mid-American Conference	Miami (OH)	4–0
Midwest Collegiate Athletic Conference	Ripon	6–0
Minnesota Intercollegiate Athletic Conference	Saint Thomas (MN)	5–0
Missouri Intercollegiate Athletic Association	Northwest Missouri State; Southwest Missouri State	4–1
Nebraska College Conference	Charon State; Wayne State (NE)	6–1
New Mexico Intercollegiate Conference	Sul Ross	5–0
North Central Intercollegiate Athletic Conference	Iowa State Teachers (Northern Iowa)	5–0
North Dakota College Athletic Conference	Minot State College; North Dakota Science	5–0
Ohio Athletic Conference	Heidelberg	7–0
Ohio Valley Conference	Murray State College	3–1
Oklahoma Collegiate Athletic Conference	Central State College (OK); Southeastern State College (OK)	4–1
Pacific Northwest Conference	College of Idaho	5–1
Pennsylvania State Athletic Conference	Bloomsburg State Teachers; California State Teachers	6–0
Rocky Mountain Athletic Conference	Colorado State College	3–0
South Dakota Intercollegiate Conference	Northern State Teachers (SD)	6–0
Southern California Intercollegiate Athletic Conference	Occidental	4–0
Southern Intercollegiate Athletic Conference	Florida A&M College	6–0
Southwestern Athletic Conference	Southern	7–0
State Teacher's College Conference of Minnesota	Duluth State Teachers; Mankato State Teachers; St. Cloud State Teachers	4–1
Texas Collegiate Athletic Conference	McMurry (TX)	4–1
Wisconsin State Teachers College Conference	Eau Claire State Teachers	5–1

=== Minor conference standings ===
1948 Badger-Illini Conference football standings
	Conf.					Overall
Team	W		L		T	W		L		T
Lewis +	5	–	1	–	0	6	–	2	–	0
Northwestern (WI) +	5	–	1	–	0	6	–	2	–	0
Aurora	4	–	2	–	0	5	–	2	–	0
Mission House	3	–	3	–	1	3	–	4	–	1
Milton	2	–	3	–	0	3	–	4	–	0
Wisconsin Tech	1	–	3	–	0	1	–	5	–	0
Wisconsin–Extension	1	–	5	–	1	1	–	5	–	1
Concordia (IL)	1	–	4	–	0	1	–	5	–	0
+ – Conference co-champions

1948 California Collegiate Athletic Association football standings
	Conf.					Overall
Team	W		L		T	W		L		T
San Jose State $	5	–	0	–	0	9	–	3	–	0
Pacific (CA)	4	–	1	–	0	7	–	1	–	2
Santa Barbara	2	–	3	–	0	6	–	5	–	0
Fresno State	2	–	3	–	0	3	–	6	–	1
San Diego State	1	–	4	–	0	4	–	7	–	0
Cal Poly	1	–	4	–	0	3	–	5	–	0
$ – Conference champion

1948 Central Intercollegiate Conference football standings
	Conf.					Overall
Team	W		L		T	W		L		T
Emporia State $	5	–	0	–	0	8	–	2	–	0
Fort Hays State	3	–	1	–	1	5	–	4	–	0
Southwestern (KS)	3	–	2	–	0	7	–	3	–	0
Washburn	2	–	2	–	1	3	–	5	–	1
Pittsburg State	1	–	4	–	0	2	–	6	–	2
St. Benedict's	0	–	5	–	0	0	–	9	–	0
Rockhurst	0	–	0	–	0	3	–	5	–	1
$ – Conference champion

1948 College Conference of Illinois football standings
	Conf.					Overall
Team	W		L		T	W		L		T
Illinois Wesleyan $	5	–	0	–	0	7	–	3	–	0
Wheaton (IL)	4	–	1	–	0	6	–	2	–	0
Lake Forest	4	–	1	–	0	5	–	3	–	0
Millikin	3	–	3	–	0	3	–	6	–	0
Augustana (IL)	2	–	3	–	0	4	–	3	–	1
Illinois College	2	–	3	–	0	5	–	4	–	0
Carthage	2	–	3	–	0	4	–	4	–	0
North Central (IL)	1	–	4	–	0	1	–	7	–	0
Elmhurst	0	–	5	–	0	1	–	7	–	0
$ – Conference champion

1948 Colored Intercollegiate Athletic Association football standings
	Conf.					Overall
Team	W		L		T	W		L		T
No. 4 West Virginia State $	5	–	1	–	0	5	–	2	–	2
Winston-Salem State	5	–	1	–	0	8	–	1	–	0
Howard	7	–	2	–	0	7	–	4	–	0
No. 8 Lincoln (PA)	4	–	2	–	0	5	–	2	–	0
North Carolina A&T	4	–	2	–	1	4	–	4	–	1
No. 9 Morgan State	5	–	3	–	0	5	–	3	–	0
Virginia State	5	–	3	–	0	5	–	3	–	0
North Carolina College	4	–	3	–	1	6	–	3	–	1
Shaw	4	–	3	–	0	4	–	3	–	0
Delaware State	4	–	4	–	0	4	–	5	–	0
No. 10 Virginia Union	3	–	5	–	0	6	–	5	–	0
Hampton	2	–	5	–	1	4	–	5	–	1
Bluefield State	1	–	5	–	0	2	–	7	–	0
Johnson C. Smith	0	–	7	–	1	0	–	7	–	1
St. Augustine's	1	–	4	–	0	4	–	4	–	0
Saint Paul's (VA)	0	–	4	–	0	0	–	4	–	0
$ – Conference champion; Conference standings were based on the Dickinson System.; Rankings from the Pittsburgh Courier

1948 Dakota-Iowa Athletic Conference football standings
	Conf.					Overall
Team	W		L		T	W		L		T
Buena Vista $	3	–	0	–	1	4	–	3	–	1
Dakota Wesleyan	3	–	1	–	0	4	–	5	–	0
Huron	2	–	2	–	1	4	–	4	–	1
Westmar	2	–	2	–	1	2	–	6	–	1
Yankton	1	–	2	–	1	3	–	4	–	1
Sioux Falls	0	–	4	–	0	1	–	6	–	1
$ – Conference champion

1948 Dixie Conference football standings
	Conf.					Overall
Team	W		L		T	W		L		T
Florida State $	4	–	0	–	0	7	–	1	–	0
Mississippi College	2	–	1	–	0	4	–	5	–	0
Tampa	1	–	1	–	0	2	–	6	–	0
Stetson	1	–	3	–	0	2	–	7	–	0
Millsaps	0	–	3	–	0	2	–	3	–	1
$ – Conference champion

1948 Eastern Intercollegiate Athletic Conference football standings
	Conf.					Overall
Team	W		L		T	W		L		T
Elizabeth City State $	4	–	0	–	1	5	–	1	–	1
Fayetteville State	3	–	0	–	2	4	–	3	–	2
Norfolk State	3	–	1	–	1	5	–	3	–	1
Morristown	2	–	2	–	0	3	–	4	–	0
Livingstone	2	–	3	–	0	2	–	7	–	0
Miner Teachers	1	–	2	–	0	?	–	?	–	0
Friendship	0	–	2	–	0	?	–	?	–	?
Storer	0	–	5	–	0	?	–	?	–	?
$ – Conference champion

1948 Evergreen Conference football standings
	Conf.					Overall
Team	W		L		T	W		L		T
Eastern Washington +	5	–	1	–	0	8	–	1	–	0
Puget Sound +	5	–	1	–	0	6	–	2	–	1
Pacific Lutheran	4	–	2	–	0	6	–	2	–	1
Whitworth	2	–	3	–	1	4	–	4	–	1
Central Washington	2	–	3	–	1	5	–	3	–	1
Western Washington	2	–	4	–	0	5	–	4	–	0
Saint Martin's	0	–	6	–	0	2	–	8	–	0
+ – Conference co-champions

1948 Far Western Conference football standings
	Conf.					Overall
Team	W		L		T	W		L		T
Chico State +	3	–	1	–	0	5	–	3	–	0
Southern Oregon +	3	–	1	–	0	5	–	5	–	0
San Francisco State	2	–	2	–	0	3	–	5	–	0
Humboldt State	1	–	3	–	0	6	–	3	–	0
Cal Aggies	1	–	3	–	0	2	–	6	–	0
+ – Conference co-champions

1948 Gulf States Conference football standings
	Conf.					Overall
Team	W		L		T	W		L		T
Mississippi Southern $	4	–	0	–	0	7	–	3	–	0
Louisiana Tech	4	–	1	–	0	7	–	2	–	1
Southwestern Louisiana	3	–	2	–	0	6	–	3	–	1
Northwestern State	2	–	3	–	0	5	–	3	–	1
Louisiana College	1	–	3	–	0	2	–	8	–	0
Southeastern Louisiana	0	–	5	–	0	3	–	6	–	1
$ – Conference champion

1948 Hoosier Conference football standings
	Conf.					Overall
Team	W		L		T	W		L		T
Hanover +	6	–	0	–	0	6	–	2	–	0
Anderson (IN) +	5	–	0	–	0	6	–	2	–	0
Indiana Central	4	–	2	–	0	4	–	4	–	0
Canterbury	1	–	3	–	2	2	–	4	–	2
Rose Poly	1	–	3	–	1	3	–	3	–	1
Manchester (IN)	1	–	3	–	1	1	–	6	–	1
Franklin (IN)	1	–	4	–	2	1	–	5	–	2
Earlham	0	–	4	–	0	0	–	8	–	0
+ – Conference co-champions

1948 Illinois Intercollegiate Athletic Conference football standings
	Conf.					Overall
Team	W		L		T	W		L		T
Eastern Illinois $	4	–	0	–	0	7	–	3	–	0
Illinois State Normal	3	–	1	–	0	7	–	2	–	0
Northern Illinois State	2	–	2	–	0	6	–	4	–	0
Western Illinois	1	–	3	–	0	4	–	4	–	0
Southern Illinois	0	–	4	–	0	2	–	6	–	0
$ – Conference champion

1948 Iowa Conference football standings
	Conf.					Overall
Team	W		L		T	W		L		T
Dubuque +	5	–	0	–	0	7	–	1	–	0
Upper Iowa +	4	–	0	–	0	5	–	2	–	0
Wartburg	5	–	2	–	0	5	–	3	–	0
Central (IA)	3	–	2	–	0	5	–	2	–	1
Luther	3	–	2	–	0	3	–	5	–	0
Parsons	3	–	3	–	0	3	–	5	–	0
Buena Vista	1	–	2	–	0	4	–	3	–	1
Simpson (IA)	1	–	5	–	0	2	–	7	–	0
Iowa Wesleyan	1	–	5	–	0	1	–	6	–	0
Westmar	0	–	1	–	0	2	–	6	–	1
William Penn	0	–	4	–	0	0	–	6	–	0
+ – Conference co-champions

1948 Kansas Collegiate Athletic Conference football standings
	Conf.					Overall
Team	W		L		T	W		L		T
Ottawa $	6	–	0	–	0	7	–	3	–	0
Bethany (KS)	5	–	1	–	0	6	–	3	–	0
College of Emporia	3	–	3	–	0	4	–	3	–	1
Kansas Wesleyan	3	–	3	–	0	5	–	4	–	0
Baker	3	–	3	–	0	4	–	5	–	0
Bethel (KS)	1	–	5	–	0	2	–	7	–	0
McPherson	0	–	6	–	0	0	–	8	–	0
$ – Conference champion

1948 Lone Star Conference football standings
	Conf.					Overall
Team	W		L		T	W		L		T
Southwest Texas State $	6	–	0	–	0	8	–	1	–	0
North Texas State	4	–	2	–	0	6	–	4	–	0
Stephen F. Austin	3	–	2	–	1	7	–	2	–	1
Trinity (TX)	2	–	2	–	2	6	–	2	–	2
Houston	3	–	3	–	0	5	–	6	–	0
East Texas State	1	–	4	–	1	3	–	6	–	1
Sam Houston State	0	–	6	–	0	0	–	9	–	1
$ – Conference champion

1948 Mason–Dixon Conference football standings
	Conf.					Overall
Team	W		L		T	W		L		T
Johns Hopkins $	3	–	0	–	0	7	–	1	–	0
Hampden–Sydney	2	–	0	–	0	6	–	2	–	1
Western Maryland	4	–	1	–	0	5	–	2	–	0
Mount St. Mary's	2	–	1	–	0	2	–	6	–	0
Randolph–Macon	3	–	2	–	0	4	–	6	–	0
Washington College	2	–	4	–	0	2	–	4	–	0
Gallaudet	0	–	3	–	0	1	–	5	–	0
Catholic University	0	–	5	–	0	1	–	7	–	0
$ – Conference champion; Conference standings were based on the Dickinson Scoring System; three conference games were necessary to be eligible for conference title.

1948 Michigan Intercollegiate Athletic Association football standings
	Conf.					Overall
Team	W		L		T	W		L		T
Alma $	5	–	0	–	0	8	–	0	–	0
Kalamazoo	3	–	1	–	1	4	–	4	–	1
Hillsdale	2	–	2	–	1	6	–	2	–	1
Hope	2	–	3	–	0	5	–	3	–	0
Adrian	2	–	3	–	0	5	–	4	–	0
Albion	0	–	5	–	0	2	–	6	–	0
$ – Conference champion

1948 Midlands Conference football standings
	Conf.					Overall
Team	W		L		T	W		L		T
Loras +	2	–	1	–	0	7	–	1	–	0
St. Ambrose +	2	–	1	–	0	7	–	3	–	0
St. Norbert	1	–	2	–	0	4	–	5	–	0
Saint Joseph's (IN)	1	–	2	–	0	3	–	5	–	0
+ – Conference co-champions

1948 Midwest Athletic Association football standings
	Conf.					Overall
Team	W		L		T	W		L		T
No. 3 Wilberforce State $	3	–	0	–	0	9	–	1	–	1
No. 6 Kentucky State	2	–	1	–	1	7	–	2	–	1
Tennessee A&I	2	–	2	–	0	5	–	3	–	1
Lincoln (MO)	1	–	2	–	1	2	–	3	–	2
Louisville Municipal	0	–	3	–	0	3	–	5	–	0
$ – Conference champion; Rankings from the Pittsburgh Courier

1948 Midwest Conference football standings
	Conf.					Overall
Team	W		L		T	W		L		T
Ripon $	6	–	0	–	0	6	–	2	–	0
Lawrence	5	–	1	–	0	7	–	1	–	0
Carleton	4	–	2	–	0	6	–	2	–	0
Knox	3	–	3	–	0	4	–	3	–	1
Cornell (IA)	3	–	3	–	0	4	–	4	–	0
Monmouth (IL)	3	–	3	–	0	4	–	5	–	0
Coe	1	–	4	–	1	1	–	5	–	2
Grinnell	1	–	5	–	0	1	–	7	–	0
Beloit	0	–	5	–	1	0	–	7	–	1
$ – Conference champion

1948 Minnesota Intercollegiate Athletic Conference football standings
	Conf.					Overall
Team	W		L		T	W		L		T
St. Thomas (MN) $	5	–	0	–	0	7	–	1	–	1
Gustavus Adolphus	4	–	1	–	0	7	–	1	–	1
Macalester	4	–	1	–	0	6	–	2	–	0
Saint John's (MN)	3	–	2	–	0	6	–	2	–	0
Hamline	2	–	2	–	2	3	–	2	–	2
St. Olaf	2	–	2	–	1	3	–	4	–	1
Augsburg	0	–	3	–	2	1	–	3	–	2
Concordia (MN)	0	–	4	–	1	3	–	4	–	1
Saint Mary's (MN)	0	–	5	–	0	0	–	8	–	0
$ – Conference champion

1948 Minnesota Teachers College Conference football standings
	Conf.					Overall
Team	W		L		T	W		L		T
Mankato State +	4	–	1	–	0	5	–	2	–	0
Duluth State +	4	–	1	–	0	4	–	3	–	0
St. Cloud State +	4	–	1	–	0	4	–	3	–	0
Bemidji State	2	–	3	–	0	3	–	5	–	0
Winona State	1	–	4	–	0	1	–	7	–	0
Moorhead State	0	–	5	–	0	2	–	7	–	0
+ – Conference co-champions; Moorhead State forfeited a conference wins over St. Cloud State, Bemidji State, and Winona State because of an ineligible player.

1948 Missouri College Athletic Union football standings
	Conf.					Overall
Team	W		L		T	W		L		T
Missouri Valley $	4	–	0	–	0	9	–	1	–	1
Culver–Stockton	3	–	1	–	0	4	–	5	–	0
Central (MO)	2	–	2	–	0	5	–	3	–	0
William Jewell	1	–	3	–	0	3	–	6	–	0
Tarkio	0	–	4	–	0	2	–	5	–	0
$ – Conference champion

1948 Missouri Intercollegiate Athletic Association football standings
	Conf.					Overall
Team	W		L		T	W		L		T
SW Missouri State +	4	–	1	–	0	9	–	2	–	0
NW Missouri State +	4	–	1	–	0	6	–	2	–	0
Missouri Mines	2	–	1	–	2	4	–	3	–	2
Kirksville State	2	–	2	–	1	4	–	3	–	2
SE Missouri State	0	–	3	–	2	0	–	7	–	2
Central Missouri State	0	–	4	–	1	0	–	7	–	2
+ – Conference co-champions

1948 Mid-American Conference football standings
	Conf.					Overall
Team	W		L		T	W		L		T
Miami (OH) $	4	–	0	–	0	7	–	1	–	1
Western Michigan	3	–	1	–	0	6	–	3	–	0
Cincinnati	3	–	1	–	0	3	–	6	–	1
Ohio	2	–	3	–	0	3	–	6	–	0
Western Reserve	1	–	4	–	0	1	–	8	–	1
Butler	0	–	4	–	0	3	–	5	–	0
$ – Conference champion

1948 Nebraska College Conference football standings
	Conf.					Overall
Team	W		L		T	W		L		T
Wayne State (NE) +	6	–	1	–	0	8	–	1	–	0
Chadron State +	6	–	1	–	0	7	–	1	–	0
Nebraska Wesleyan	5	–	2	–	0	6	–	3	–	0
Doane	4	–	2	–	0	5	–	4	–	0
Kearney State	3	–	3	–	0	5	–	3	–	0
Peru State	3	–	3	–	0	4	–	4	–	0
Hastings	1	–	5	–	0	2	–	7	–	0
York (NE)	0	–	5	–	0	2	–	6	–	0
Midland	0	–	6	–	0	0	–	10	–	0
+ – Conference co-champions

1948 New Mexico Conference football standings
	Conf.					Overall
Team	W		L		T	W		L		T
Sul Ross $	5	–	0	–	0	10	–	0	–	1
Adams State	3	–	1	–	0	6	–	2	–	0
Eastern New Mexico	5	–	2	–	0	6	–	3	–	0
New Mexico Highlands	2	–	3	–	1	?	–	?	–	?
New Mexico Teachers	2	–	3	–	1	3	–	4	–	1
New Mexico Military	2	–	3	–	0	4	–	5	–	0
Panhandle A&M	1	–	5	–	1	1	–	7	–	1
St. Michael's (NM)	0	–	3	–	1	0	–	5	–	1
$ – Conference champion

1948 North Central Conference football standings
	Conf.					Overall
Team	W		L		T	W		L		T
Iowa State Teachers $	5	–	0	–	0	7	–	3	–	0
South Dakota	4	–	1	–	0	7	–	3	–	0
North Dakota	3	–	3	–	0	3	–	7	–	0
South Dakota State	2	–	4	–	0	4	–	6	–	0
Morningside	2	–	4	–	0	3	–	6	–	0
Augustana (SD)	2	–	4	–	0	3	–	6	–	0
North Dakota State	2	–	4	–	0	3	–	7	–	0
$ – Conference champion

1948 North Dakota Intercollegiate Conference football standings
	Conf.					Overall
Team	W		L		T	W		L		T
Minot State +	5	–	0	–	0	6	–	1	–	0
Wahpeton Science +	5	–	0	–	0	5	–	2	–	0
Valley City State	4	–	2	–	0	5	–	3	–	0
Bottineau	3	–	2	–	0	3	–	2	–	1
Ellendale	3	–	3	–	0	3	–	3	–	0
Dickinson State	2	–	3	–	0	3	–	5	–	0
Mayville State	2	–	3	–	0	2	–	3	–	0
Jamestown	0	–	5	–	0	0	–	8	–	0
Bismarck JC	0	–	6	–	0	0	–	6	–	0
+ – Conference co-champions

1948 North State Conference football standings
	Conf.					Overall
Team	W		L		T	W		L		T
Appalachian State $	7	–	0	–	1	8	–	1	–	1
Western Carolina	3	–	1	–	0	7	–	3	–	0
Catawba	5	–	2	–	0	5	–	4	–	1
Lenoir Rhyne	5	–	2	–	1	6	–	3	–	1
High Point	4	–	3	–	1	5	–	3	–	2
Elon	3	–	4	–	1	4	–	5	–	1
Guilford	1	–	5	–	0	4	–	6	–	0
Atlantic Christian	1	–	6	–	0	2	–	7	–	0
East Carolina	0	–	6	–	0	0	–	9	–	0
$ – Conference champion

1948 Northwest Conference football standings
	Conf.					Overall
Team	W		L		T	W		L		T
College of Idaho $	5	–	1	–	0	9	–	1	–	0
Pacific (OR)	4	–	1	–	1	5	–	3	–	1
Lewis & Clark	4	–	2	–	0	6	–	2	–	0
Willamette	4	–	2	–	0	6	–	5	–	0
Whitman	2	–	3	–	1	4	–	4	–	1
Linfield	1	–	5	–	0	3	–	6	–	0
British Columbia	0	–	5	–	1	0	–	7	–	1
$ – Conference champion

1948 Ohio Athletic Conference football standings
	Conf.					Overall
Team	W		L		T	W		L		T
Heidelberg $	7	–	0	–	0	9	–	0	–	0
Denison	6	–	0	–	0	8	–	0	–	0
Kent State	3	–	0	–	0	6	–	2	–	1
Ohio Wesleyan	2	–	0	–	0	6	–	2	–	0
Wilmington (OH)	1	–	0	–	0	5	–	3	–	1
Mount Union	6	–	2	–	0	6	–	3	–	0
Ohio Northern	2	–	2	–	0	5	–	3	–	1
Muskingum	3	–	3	–	1	3	–	4	–	1
Capital	3	–	4	–	0	4	–	4	–	0
Findlay	1	–	2	–	0	4	–	3	–	1
Marietta	1	–	2	–	0	4	–	4	–	0
Wooster	2	–	5	–	1	3	–	6	–	1
Oberlin	1	–	3	–	0	3	–	5	–	0
Akron	1	–	4	–	0	2	–	6	–	0
Wittenberg	1	–	6	–	0	1	–	7	–	0
Otterbein	0	–	4	–	0	2	–	6	–	1
Kenyon	0	–	3	–	0	1	–	6	–	1
$ – Conference champion

1948 Ohio Valley Conference football standings
	Conf.					Overall
Team	W		L		T	W		L		T
Murray State +	3	–	1	–	0	9	–	1	–	1
Evansville +	3	–	1	–	0	6	–	3	–	0
Eastern Kentucky	2	–	2	–	0	8	–	3	–	0
Louisville	1	–	1	–	0	5	–	5	–	0
Western Kentucky	2	–	3	–	0	5	–	4	–	0
Morehead State	0	–	3	–	0	3	–	5	–	0
+ – Conference co-champions

1948 Oklahoma Collegiate Conference football standings
	Conf.					Overall
Team	W		L		T	W		L		T
SE Oklahoma State +	4	–	1	–	0	7	–	2	–	0
Central State (OK) +	4	–	1	–	0	6	–	2	–	0
East Central	3	–	2	–	0	6	–	4	–	0
NW Oklahoma State	1	–	3	–	1	2	–	5	–	1
SW Oklahoma State	1	–	3	–	1	1	–	7	–	1
Northeastern State	1	–	4	–	0	2	–	7	–	0
+ – Conference co-champions

1948 Pennsylvania State Teachers College Conference football standings
	Conf.					Overall
Team	W		L		T	W		L		T
Bloomsburg $	6	–	0	–	0	9	–	0	–	0
California (PA)	6	–	0	–	0	6	–	1	–	0
West Chester	3	–	0	–	0	7	–	1	–	0
Slippery Rock	3	–	2	–	0	7	–	2	–	0
Lock Haven	3	–	2	–	0	6	–	4	–	0
East Stroudsburg	3	–	2	–	0	4	–	3	–	1
Shippensburg	4	–	3	–	0	5	–	3	–	0
Clarion	2	–	2	–	0	4	–	4	–	0
Mansfield	3	–	3	–	0	3	–	4	–	1
Millersville	1	–	6	–	0	1	–	7	–	0
Indiana (PA)	1	–	6	–	0	1	–	8	–	0
Kutztown	0	–	4	–	0	3	–	4	–	1
Edinboro	0	–	5	–	0	1	–	7	–	0
$ – Conference champion

1948 Pioneer Conference (Illinois) football standings
	Conf.					Overall
Team	W		L		T	W		L		T
Quincy (IL) $	3	–	0	–	0	7	–	2	–	0
Shurtleff	2	–	1	–	0	4	–	4	–	0
Eureka	1	–	2	–	0	4	–	3	–	0
McKendree	0	–	3	–	0	1	–	7	–	0
$ – Conference champion

1948 Rocky Mountain Conference football standings
	Conf.					Overall
Team	W		L		T	W		L		T
Colorado State–Greeley $	3	–	0	–	0	4	–	4	–	0
Western State (CO)	2	–	1	–	0	6	–	4	–	0
Colorado College	1	–	2	–	0	2	–	7	–	1
Colorado Mines	0	–	3	–	0	3	–	6	–	0
Montana State	0	–	0	–	0	2	–	7	–	0
$ – Conference champion

1948 Smoky Mountain Conference football standings
	Conf.					Overall
Team	W		L		T	W		L		T
Milligan *	3	–	0	–	0	9	–	1	–	1
Emory and Henry	1	–	1	–	0	2	–	8	–	0
Carson–Newman	1	–	2	–	0	4	–	6	–	0
Tusculum	0	–	2	–	0	2	–	7	–	0
* – Milligan was suspended from title eligibility for using an ineligible player.

1948 South Dakota Intercollegiate Conference football standings
	Conf.					Overall
Team	W		L		T	W		L		T
Northern State $	5	–	0	–	0	7	–	1	–	0
Southern State (SD)	4	–	3	–	0	5	–	3	–	0
South Dakota Mines	2	–	2	–	0	5	–	3	–	0
General Beadle	2	–	2	–	1	4	–	3	–	1
Huron	2	–	2	–	0	4	–	4	–	1
Yankton	2	–	3	–	0	3	–	4	–	1
Black Hills	1	–	3	–	0	2	–	7	–	0
Sioux Falls	0	–	3	–	1	1	–	6	–	1
$ – Conference champion

1948 Southern California Conference football standings
	Conf.					Overall
Team	W		L		T	W		L		T
Occidental $	4	–	0	–	0	9	–	0	–	0
Pomona	3	–	1	–	0	6	–	2	–	0
Whittier	2	–	2	–	0	6	–	4	–	0
Redlands	1	–	3	–	0	1	–	7	–	0
Caltech	0	–	4	–	0	1	–	6	–	0
$ – Conference champion

1948 Southern Intercollegiate Athletic Conference football standings
	Conf.					Overall
Team	W		L		T	W		L		T
Florida A&M $	6	–	0	–	0	8	–	2	–	0
Lane	4	–	0	–	1	7	–	1	–	1
Allen	3	–	0	–	0	7	–	1	–	0
South Carolina State	3	–	1	–	1	4	–	3	–	1
Tuskegee	3	–	2	–	1	4	–	4	–	1
Fort Valley State	5	–	1	–	0	7	–	1	–	0
Alabama A&M	3	–	2	–	1	4	–	2	–	1
Morehouse	3	–	3	–	0	4	–	4	–	0
Morris Brown	3	–	4	–	0	3	–	6	–	0
Benedict	1	–	4	–	1	1	–	4	–	2
Clark (GA)	3	–	3	–	1	4	–	3	–	1
Fisk	2	–	2	–	0	3	–	4	–	0
Xavier (LA)	0	–	4	–	1	1	–	6	–	1
Alabama State	1	–	7	–	1	1	–	8	–	1
LeMoyne	0	–	4	–	0	0	–	7	–	1
Knoxville	0	–	3	–	0	?	–	?	–	?
$ – Conference champion; Conference standings were based on the Dickinson System.

1948 Southwestern Athletic Conference football standings
	Conf.					Overall
Team	W		L		T	W		L		T
No. 1 Southern $	7	–	0	–	0	12	–	0	–	0
No. 7 Texas College	5	–	2	–	0	8	–	3	–	0
Langston	5	–	2	–	0	7	–	3	–	0
Prairie View A&M	4	–	2	–	1	6	–	4	–	1
Samuel Huston	3	–	4	–	0	5	–	5	–	0
Arkansas AM&N	2	–	5	–	0	4	–	5	–	1
Bishop	1	–	5	–	1	2	–	7	–	1
Wiley	0	–	7	–	0	0	–	9	–	1
$ – Conference champion; Rankings from The Pittsburgh Courier

1948 Texas Conference football standings
	Conf.					Overall
Team	W		L		T	W		L		T
McMurry $	4	–	1	–	0	6	–	4	–	0
Abilene Christian	3	–	1	–	1	5	–	3	–	1
Hardin	3	–	1	–	1	4	–	5	–	1
Howard Payne	2	–	3	–	0	5	–	5	–	0
Southwestern (TX)	2	–	3	–	0	6	–	3	–	0
Austin	0	–	5	–	0	2	–	9	–	0
$ – Conference champion

1948 Volunteer State Athletic Conference football standings
	Conf.					Overall
Team	W		L		T	W		L		T
Austin Peay +	2	–	0	–	0	8	–	2	–	0
Tennessee Tech +	2	–	0	–	0	5	–	6	–	0
Milligan	1	–	0	–	0	9	–	1	–	1
Middle Tennessee	2	–	2	–	0	5	–	5	–	0
Union (TN)	1	–	3	–	0	3	–	7	–	0
Cumberland (TN)	0	–	3	–	0	3	–	6	–	0
+ – Conference co-champions

1948 West Virginia Intercollegiate Athletic Conference football standings
	Conf.					Overall
Team	W		L		T	W		L		T
Morris Harvey $	3	–	0	–	1	5	–	2	–	2
West Liberty State	4	–	1	–	0	8	–	1	–	0
Davis & Elkins	7	–	2	–	0	7	–	2	–	0
Salem	2	–	1	–	1	3	–	4	–	3
West Virginia Tech	5	–	3	–	0	0	–	5	–	5
West Virginia Wesleyan	3	–	2	–	2	4	–	4	–	2
Fairmont State	3	–	3	–	1	3	–	4	–	1
Shepherd	2	–	3	–	1	3	–	3	–	1
Concord	2	–	4	–	0	4	–	5	–	0
Potomac State	1	–	3	–	0	3	–	4	–	1
Bethany (WV)	1	–	3	–	0	1	–	6	–	0
Glenville State	0	–	7	–	0	0	–	7	–	0
$ – Conference champion; Ties did not count in conference standings.

1948 Wisconsin State Teachers College Conference football standings
	Conf.					Overall
Team	W		L		T	W		L		T
Eau Claire State $	5	–	1	–	0	6	–	1	–	0
La Crosse State	4	–	1	–	1	7	–	1	–	1
Milwaukee State	4	–	1	–	1	4	–	3	–	1
River Falls State	4	–	2	–	0	4	–	4	–	0
Superior State	3	–	3	–	0	5	–	3	–	0
Stevens Point State	3	–	3	–	0	4	–	4	–	1
Stout Institute	3	–	3	–	0	3	–	4	–	1
Oshkosh State	1	–	4	–	1	1	–	4	–	1
Whitewater State	1	–	4	–	1	2	–	5	–	1
Platteville State	0	–	6	–	0	0	–	6	–	0
$ – Conference champion; The La Crosse State–Whitewater State game and the Stevens Point State–Stout State game on November 6 did not count in the conference standings.

1948 Yankee Conference football standings
	Conf.					Overall
Team	W		L		T	W		L		T
New Hampshire $	3	–	1	–	0	5	–	3	–	0
Connecticut	2	–	1	–	0	3	–	5	–	0
Vermont	1	–	1	–	0	4	–	3	–	1
UMass	1	–	1	–	1	3	–	4	–	1
Maine	1	–	2	–	0	4	–	3	–	0
Rhode Island State	1	–	3	–	0	2	–	4	–	1
$ – Conference champion

=== Non-major independents ===
1948 Eastern non-major college football independents records
	Conf.			Overall
Team	W	L	T	W		L		T
Buffalo		–		6	–	1	–	1
Franklin & Marshall		–		5	–	3	–	1
CCNY		–		3	–	4	–	1
Tufts		–		3	–	4	–	1
Northeastern		–		1	–	4	–	1
Carnegie Tech		–		1	–	7	–	0
Hofstra		–		0	–	6	–	2
Bucknell		–		1	–	8	–	0
Drexel		–		0	–	8	–	0

1948 Midwestern non-major college football independents records
	Conf.			Overall
Team	W	L	T	W		L		T
Michigan Tech		–		7	–	0	–	0
Bowling Green		–		8	–	0	–	1
Washington University		–		9	–	1	–	0
John Carroll		–		7	–	1	–	2
Ashland		–		6	–	1	–	2
Ball State		–		6	–	2	–	0
Dayton		–		7	–	2	–	1
Baldwin–Wallace		–		5	–	2	–	2
Indiana State		–		4	–	4	–	0
Wabash		–		4	–	4	–	0
Wayne		–		4	–	4	–	0
Valparaiso		–		4	–	5	–	0
Toledo		–		5	–	6	–	0
Michigan State Normal		–		3	–	5	–	0
Xavier		–		4	–	6	–	0
Central Michigan		–		3	–	6	–	0

1948 Southern non-major college football independents records
	Conf.			Overall
Team	W	L	T	W		L		T
Maryland State		–		7	–	1	–	0
Sewanee		–		6	–	1	–	1
Grambling		–		8	–	2	–	0
East Tennessee State		–		6	–	2	–	1
Delaware		–		5	–	3	–	0
Memphis State		–		6	–	5	–	0
Tennessee Tech		–		5	–	6	–	0
Oklahoma City		–		4	–	5	–	1
Marshall		–		2	–	7	–	1
Tampa		–		2	–	6	–	0
Texas State		–		0	–	8	–	1
CCUNC		–		0	–	5	–	0

1948 Western non-major college football independents records
	Conf.			Overall
Team	W	L	T	W		L		T
Hawaii		–		7	–	4	–	1
Idaho State		–		6	–	1	–	1
Cal Poly San Dimas		–		6	–	4	–	0
Pepperdine		–		4	–	5	–	0
Loyola (CA)		–		3	–	5	–	1
La Verne		–		3	–	5	–	0

== Bowl games ==
=== Major bowls ===
Bowl game	Winning team		Losing team	
Rose Bowl	No. 7 Northwestern	20	No. 4 California	14
Sugar Bowl	No. 5 Oklahoma	14	No. 3 North Carolina	6
Orange Bowl	Texas	41	No. 8 Georgia	28
Cotton Bowl	No. 10 SMU	21	No. 9 Oregon	13

=== Other bowls ===
Bowl game	Winning team		Losing team	
Sun Bowl	West Virginia	21	Texas Mines	12
Gator Bowl	No. 11 Clemson	24	Missouri	23
Tangerine Bowl	Murray State	21	Sul Ross	21
Dixie Bowl	Baylor	20	No. 20 Wake Forest	7
Raisin Bowl	Occidental	21	Colorado A&M	20
Harbor Bowl	Villanova	27	Nevada	7
Salad Bowl	Drake	14	Arizona	13
Delta Bowl	No. 17 William & Mary	20	Oklahoma A&M	0
Fruit Bowl	Southern	30	San Francisco State	0
Grape Bowl	Hardin–Simmons	35	Pacific	35
Shrine Bowl	Hardin–Simmons	40	Ouachita Baptist	12
Camellia Bowl	Hardin–Simmons	49	Wichita	12

== Heisman Trophy voting ==
The Heisman Trophy is given to the year's most outstanding player

Player	School	Position	Total
Doak Walker	SMU	HB	778
Charlie Justice	North Carolina	HB	443
Chuck Bednarik	Penn	C	336
Jackie Jensen	California	HB	143
Stan Heath	Nevada	QB	113
Norm Van Brocklin	Oregon	QB	83
Emil Sitko	Notre Dame	FB/HB	73
Jack Mitchell	Oklahoma	QB	68

== See also ==
- 1948 College Football All-America Team
