= 1948 college football rankings =

- Season: 1948
- Bowl season: 1948–49 bowl games
- End of season champions: Michigan

One human poll comprised the 1948 college football rankings. Unlike most sports, college football's governing body, the NCAA, does not bestow a national championship, instead that title is bestowed by one or more different polling agencies. There are two main weekly polls that begin in the preseason—the AP Poll and the Coaches' Poll. The Coaches' Poll began operation in 1950; in addition, the AP Poll did not begin conducting preseason polls until that same year.

== Legend ==
	Increase in ranking
	Decrease in ranking
	Not ranked previous week
	National champion
(#–#)	Win–loss record
(Italics)	Number of first place votes
т	Tied with team above or below also with this symbol

== AP Poll ==
The final AP Poll was released on November 29, at the end of the regular season, weeks before the major bowls. The AP did not release a January final poll regularly until the 1968 season (January 1969).

	Week 1 Oct 4	Week 2 Oct 11	Week 3 Oct 18	Week 4 Oct 25	Week 5 Nov 1	Week 6 Nov 8	Week 7 Nov 15	Week 8 Nov 22	Week 9 (Final) Nov 29	
1.	Notre Dame (2–0) (50)	North Carolina (3–0) (52)	Michigan (4–0) (74)	Michigan (5–0) (117)	Notre Dame (6–0) (56)	Michigan (7–0) (77)	Michigan (8–0) (130)	Michigan (9–0) (105)	Michigan (9–0) (192)	1.
2.	North Carolina (2–0) (55)	Notre Dame (3–0) (34)	Notre Dame (4–0) (23)	Notre Dame (5–0) (19)	Michigan (6–0) (68)	Notre Dame (7–0) (80)	Notre Dame (8–0) (27)	Notre Dame (8–0) (38)	Notre Dame (9–0) (97)	2.
3.	Northwestern (2–0) (21)	Northwestern (3–0) (25)	North Carolina (4–0) (32)	North Carolina (5–0) (46)	North Carolina (6–0) (36)	Army (7–0) (14)	Army (8–0) (3)	Army (8–0) (5)	North Carolina (9–0–1) (31)	3.
4.	SMU (2–0) (13)	Michigan (3–0) (24)	California (5–0) (14)	California (6–0) (13)	Army (6–0) (5)	California (8–0) (11)	California (9–0) (16)	North Carolina (8–0–1) (14)	California (10–0) (5)	4.
5.	Army (2–0) (7)	Army (3–0) (5)	Army (4–0) (1)	Army (5–0) (4)	California (7–0) (16)	Penn State (5–0–1) (1)	North Carolina (7–0–1) (11)	California (10–0) (3)	Oklahoma (9–1) (30)	5.
6.	Georgia Tech (2–0)	California (4–0) (10)	Georgia Tech (4–0)	Georgia Tech (5–0) (1)	Georgia Tech (6–0) (7)	North Carolina (6–0–1) (7)	Penn State (6–0–1) (3)	Oklahoma (8–1) (13)	Army (8–0–1)	6.
7.	Michigan (2–0) (2)	Georgia Tech (3–0)	Penn (3–0)	Penn (4–0)	Penn (5–0)	SMU (6–1)	Northwestern (6–2)	Northwestern (7–2)	Northwestern (7–2)	7.
8.	Minnesota (2–0)	Penn (2–0) (7)	Penn State (3–0) (1)	Missouri (4–1) (1)	SMU (5–1) (1)	Northwestern (6–1)	Oklahoma (7–1) (5)	SMU (8–1)	Georgia (9–1) (5)	8.
9.	California (3–0) (3)	Penn State (2–0) (1)	Missouri (3–1) (2)	Northwestern (4–1)	Missouri (5–1) (4)	Oklahoma (6–1) (5)	Clemson (7–0) (9)	Clemson (8–0) (8)	Oregon (9–1)	9.
10.	Penn State (1–0) (2)	Ole Miss (3–0)	Northwestern (3–1)	Nevada (5–0) (3)	Northwestern (5–1)	Clemson (6–0) (8)	SMU (7–1)	Oregon (9–1)	SMU (8–1–1)	10.
11.	Ohio State (2–0)	Minnesota (3–0)	SMU (3–1)	SMU (4–1)	Nevada (6–0) (5)	Georgia Tech (6–1)	Georgia (7–1) (2)	Michigan State (6–2–1) (3)	Clemson (9–0) (6)	11.
12.	Penn (1–0)	Missouri (2–1) (1)	Cornell (4–0)	Penn State (3–0–1) (1)	Clemson (5–0) (6)	Michigan State (4–2–1) (1)	Michigan State (5–2–1) (2)	Georgia (8–1) (1)	Vanderbilt (7–2–1) (2)	12.
13.	Arkansas (2–0) т	Cornell (3–0)	Minnesota (3–1)	Clemson (4–0)	Georgia (5–1)	Georgia (6–1) (1)	Oregon (8–1)	Minnesota (7–2)	Tulane (9–1)	13.
14.	Ole Miss (2–0) т	SMU (2–1)	Clemson (3–0)	Oregon (5–1)	Penn State (4–0–1) (1)	Minnesota (5–2)	Tulane (7–1)	Tulane (8–1)	Michigan State (6–2–2) (2)	14.
15.	Purdue (0–2)	Clemson (2–0)	Duke (2–0–2) т	Minnesota (3–2)	Oklahoma (5–1) (2)	Oregon (7–1)	Minnesota (6–2)	Vanderbilt (6–2–1)	Ole Miss (8–1) (13)	15.
16.	Texas (1–0)	Georgia (2–1)	Nevada (4–0) (1) т	Oklahoma (4–1) (1)	Oregon (6–1)	Nevada (6–1)	Penn (5–2)	Ole Miss (7–1)	Minnesota (7–2)	16.
17.	Indiana (2–0)	Nevada (3–0)	Tulane (3–1)	Michigan State (2–2–1)	Michigan State (3–2–1)	Penn (5–1)	Ole Miss (7–1)	Ohio State (6–3)	William & Mary (6–2–2)	17.
18.	Harvard (1–0)	Duke (1–0–2)	Oklahoma (3–1)	Georgia (4–1)	Wake Forest (4–2)	Tennessee (4–2–1)	Ohio State (6–2)	Penn State (6–1–1)	Penn State (7–1–1)	18.
19.	Nevada (2–0)	Baylor (2–0–1)	Michigan State (2–2)	Tulane (4–1)	Minnesota (4–2)	Wake Forest (5–2)	Cornell (7–1)	Penn (5–2)	Cornell (8–1)	19.
20.	Tennessee (0–1–1)	Oklahoma (2–1)	Ole Miss (3–1)	Baylor (4–0–1) т; Texas (4–2) т	Tulane (5–1)	Missouri (5–2)	Georgia Tech (6–2)	William & Mary (5–2–2)	Wake Forest (6–3)	20.
	Week 1 Oct 4	Week 2 Oct 11	Week 3 Oct 18	Week 4 Oct 25	Week 5 Nov 1	Week 6 Nov 8	Week 7 Nov 15	Week 8 Nov 22	Week 9 (Final) Nov 29	
		Dropped: Arkansas; Harvard; Indiana; Ohio State; Purdue; Tennessee; Texas	Dropped: Baylor; Georgia	Dropped: Duke; Ole Miss; Cornell	Dropped: Baylor	Dropped: Tulane	Dropped: Missouri; Nevada; Tennessee; Wake Forest	Dropped: Cornell; Georgia Tech	Dropped: Ohio State; Penn	

== Litkenhous Ratings ==
The final Litkenhous Ratings released in December 1948 provided numerical rankings to more than 700 college and military football programs. The top 100 ranked teams were:

1. Michigan (9–0) - 114.1
2. Notre Dame (9–0–1) - 106.9
3. Michigan State (6–2–2) - 103.6
4. Army (8–0–1) - 102.1
5. Oklahoma (10–1) - 99.6
6. North Carolina (9–1–1) - 99.4
7. California (10–1) - 99.1
8. Vanderbilt (8–2–1) - 99.1
9. Ohio State (6–3) - 98.4
10. Northwestern (8–2) - 98.0
11. SMU (9–1–1) - 97.9
12. Ole Miss (8–1) - 97.8
13. Minnesota (7–2) - 97.1
14. Georgia (9–2) - 95.7
15. Nevada (9–2) - 93.9
16. Georgia Tech (7–3) - 93.2
17. Missouri - 93.1
18. USC (6–3–1) - 92.1
19. Tulane (9–1) - 91.7
20. Texas (7–3–1) - 90.1
21. Penn State (7–1–1) - 89.8
22. Penn (5–3) - 89.8
23. Illinois (3–6) - 89.5
24. Villanova (8–2–1) - 89.2
25. Cornell (8–1) - 88.7
26. Santa Clara (7–2–1) - 88.6
27. Dartmouth (6–2) - 88.4
28. Oregon (9–2) - 88.3
29. Tennessee (4–4–2) - 88.3
30. Kentucky (5–3–2) - 88.1
31. Pittsburgh (6–3) - 85.7
32. Alabama (6–4–1) - 84.8
33. Baylor (6–3–2) - 84.6
34. Purdue (3–6) - 84.5
35. Clemson (11–0) - 84.2
36. Arkansas (5–5) - 83.9
37. Duke (4–3–2) - 83.9
38. Rice (5–4–1) - 83.9
39. Wake Forest (6–4) - 83.5
40. TCU (4–5–1) - 83.5
41. Princeton (4–4) - 82.5
42. Iowa (4–5) - 82.3
43. Mississippi State (4–4–1) - 82.3
44. William & Mary (7–2–2) - 82.3
45. Stanford (4–6) - 81.6
46. Boston College (5–2–2) - 81.4
47. Kansas (7–3) - 80.1
48. Utah (8–1–1) - 79.9
49. Columbia (4–5) - 79.8
50. Oklahoma A&M (6–4) - 79.5
51. Maryland (6–4) - 79.4
52. Wisconsin (2–7) - 78.5
53. Navy (0–8–1) - 78.4
54. Oregon State (5–4–3) - 78.4
55. Brown (7–2) - 78.3
56. Texas Tech (7–3) - 77.9
57. Miami (OH) (7–1–1) - 77.7
58. Rutgers (7–2) - 76.7
59. Florida (5–5) - 76.1
60. Detroit (6–3) - 75.9
61. Harvard (4–4) - 75.9
62. Washington (2–7–1) - 75.9
63. Indiana (2–7) - 75.8
64. Washington State (4–5–1) - 75.4
65. Miami (FL) (4–6) - 75.2
66. NC State (3–6–1) - 74.8
67. Pacific (7–1–2) - 74.5
68. Saint Mary's (4–6) - 74.4
69. UCLA (3–7) - 74.3
70. Texas A&M (0–9–1) - 74.2
71. Dayton (7–2–1) - 73.8
72. Virginia (5–3–1) - 73.2
73. Texas Mines (8–2–1) - 72.0
74. LSU (3–7) - 71.8
75. Yale (4–5) - 71.8
76. St. Bonaventure (7–1–1) - 71.7
77. West Virginia (9–3) - 71.6
78. Chattanooga (4–5) - 71.1
79. Iowa State (4–6) - 70.4
80. Lafayette (7–2) - 70.3
81. San Jose State (9–3) - 70.2
82. Colorado (3–6) - 69.9
83. Holy Cross (5–5) - 69.5
84. Hardin–Simmons - 69.3
85. VMI (6–3) - 68.8
86. John Carroll (7–1–2) - 68.3
87. Nebraska (2–8) - 68.2
88. Marquette (2–8) - 67.6
89. San Francisco (2–7) - 67.5
90. Idaho (3–6) - 67.4
91. Canisius - 67.2
92. Denver (4–5–1) - 67.2
93. Drake (7–3) - 67.1
94. Colgate (3–6) - 66.7
95. Wyoming (4–5) - 65.8
96. Xavier - 65.7
97. Colorado A&M (8–3) - 65.6
98. South Carolina (3–5) - 65.3
99. Georgetown (3–4–1) - 64.2
100. Bowling Green (8–0–1) - 64.1
101. Wichita (5–4–1) - 64.0
102. Boston University (6–2) - 64.2
103. Auburn (1–8–1) - 62.3
104. Kent State (6–2–1) - 61.9
105. Western Michigan (6–3) - 61.6
106. St. Thomas - 61.3
107. Murray (KY) - 60.7
108. Mississippi Southern (7–3) - 60.5
109. Youngstown - 60.5
110. Baldwin Wallace - 60.2
111. Compton - 60.1
112. Muhlenberg - 60.0
113. Cincinnati (3–6–1) - 59.9
114. Arizona (6–5) - 59.7
115. Bradley - 59.3
116. Ohio Wesleyan - 59.3
117. Richmond - 58.7
118. Heidelberg - 58.0
119. North Texas (6–4) - 57.4
120. Sul Ross - 57.4
121. Trinity (CT) - 57.3
122. Scranton - 57.1
123. Denison - 56.8
124. George Washington (4–6) - 56.7
125. Washington & Lee (4–6) - 56.7
126. West Texas (6–5) - 56.6
127. Buffalo - 56.4
128. Wayne (4–4) - 56.3
129. Syracuse (1–8) - 56.2
130. Gustavus Adolphus - 56.0
131. Iowa State Teachers (7–3) - 56.0
132. Loras - 55.9
133. Utah State - 55.7
134. Illinois Normal - 55.6
135. Eastern Washington - 55.5
136. Temple - 55.4
137. Abilene Christian - 55.1
138. New Mexico - 55.1
139. Toledo (5–6) - 55.0
140. Washington Univ. - 54.9
141. Stephen Austin - 54.8
142. Wesleyan (8–0) - 54.8
143. Delaware (5–3) - 54.7
144. Fordham (3–6) - 54.7
145. Lehigh (5–4) - 54.7
146. Emporia Teachers - 54.4
147. McMurry - 54.4
148. Eastern Kentucky - 54.3
149. Texas Southwest - 54.0
150. Tulsa (0–9–1) - 54.0

== Pittsburgh Courier ==
The Pittsburgh Courier, a leading African American newspaper, ranked the top 1948 teams from historically black colleges and universities in an era when college football was largely segregated. The rankings were published on December 11.

1. Southern (12–0)
2. Grambling (8–2)
3. Wilberforce State (9–1–1)
4. West Virginia State (5–2–2)
5. Florida A&M (8–2)
6. Kentucky State (7–2–1)
7. Texas College (8–3)
8. Lincoln (PA) (5–2)
9. Morgan State (5–3)
10. Virginia Union (6–5)

== See also ==
- 1948 College Football All-America Team
