= 1948 Pittsburgh Panthers football team =

American college football season

1948 Pittsburgh Panthers football
- Conference: Independent
- Record: 6–3
- Head coach: Mike Milligan (2nd season)
- Home stadium: Pitt Stadium

1948 Eastern major college football independents records
	Conf.			Overall
Team	W	L	T	W		L		T
No. 6 Army		–		8	–	0	–	1
Penn State		–		7	–	1	–	1
Villanova		–		8	–	2	–	1
Boston University		–		6	–	2	–	0
Boston College		–		5	–	2	–	2
Pittsburgh		–		6	–	3	–	0
Holy Cross		–		5	–	5	–	0
Colgate		–		3	–	6	–	0
Fordham		–		3	–	6	–	0
NYU		–		3	–	6	–	0
Temple		–		2	–	6	–	1
Duquesne		–		2	–	7	–	0
Syracuse		–		1	–	8	–	0
Rankings from AP Poll

The 1948 Pittsburgh Panthers football team represented the University of Pittsburgh as an independent during the 1948 college football season. The team compiled a 6–3 record under head coach Mike Milligan.

Pittsburgh was ranked at No. 31 in the final Litkenhous Difference by Score System ratings for 1948.

== Schedule ==
Date	Opponent	Site	Result	Attendance	Source
September 25	SMU	Pitt Stadium; Pittsburgh, PA	L 14–33	31,469	
October 2	Notre Dame	Pitt Stadium; Pittsburgh, PA (rivalry)	L 0–40	63,000	
October 9	West Virginia	Pitt Stadium; Pittsburgh, PA (rivalry)	W 16–6	18,401	
October 16	Marquette	Pitt Stadium; Pittsburgh, PA	W 21–7	15,830	
October 23	Indiana	Pitt Stadium; Pittsburgh, PA	W 21–14	17,118	
October 30	at Western Reserve	League Park; Cleveland, OH	W 20–0	12,000	
November 6	at Ohio State	Ohio Stadium; Columbus, OH	L 0–41	68,966	
November 13	at Purdue	Ross–Ade Stadium; West Lafayette, IN	W 20–13	30,000–35,000	
November 20	No. 6 Penn State	Pitt Stadium; Pittsburgh, PA (rivalry)	W 7–0	49,444–51,075	
Rankings from AP Poll released prior to the game

== Preseason ==
After the disastrous 1947 season, the University's Faculty Committee on Athletic Policy and Chancellor Fitzgerald's Temporary Student-Alumni Athletic Committee, both recommended changes to better the football situation. The results were made public on February 26. The Faculty Committee recommended: that Coach Milligan be asked to resign; that the committee have some control of scheduling; that the Athletic Director, James Hagan, provide an organizational chart of his Department; that a uniform program of employment for student-athletes be established; and that the Faculty Committee on Athletic Policy be reorganized. The Student-Alumni Committee agreed with some issues, but recommended that the Athletic Director, James Hagan, be fired and Coach Milligan be retained. They also recommended upgrades to Pitt's athletic facilities and equipment. After receiving the conflicting reports, the Chancellor formed another committee, the Panel of Five, led by long-time supporter Floyd Rose to come to a consensus. On April 12, the Board of Trustees accepted the Panel of Five's recommendations. Coach Milligan and Athletic Director James Hagan both kept their jobs and a new athletic committee consisting of eight voting members and the Athletic Director was formed. The Athletic Director was given more duties and was to consult with coaches on scheduling. However, the animosity between the coach and athletic director continued. When the committee convened on June 1, the rift was addressed and Mr. Hagan was unanimously asked to resign. On June 7, James Hagan resigned as Athletic Director effective July 1. Frank Carver, Pitt's Sports Publicist, was named acting director.

On March 29, Coach Milligan opened the 6-week spring practice session. Thirty-one lettermen and thirty-five aspirants from the 1947 freshmen squad were joined by another thirty newcomers. Fifty-four of these prospects were invited to the two-week preseason fall camp at Bedford Springs Resort. The Panthers squad then returned to Pittsburgh and resumed two-a-day practices in preparation for the 9-game fall schedule.

On April 11, the Pitt community was in mourning when Jock Sutherland died from a brain tumor at the age of 59.

== Coaching staff ==
1948 Pittsburgh Panthers football staff
Coaching staff: Walter “Mike” Milligan – head coach; Harold Williams – assistant coach; Dick Cassiano – assistant backfield coach; Robert Timmons – assistant end coach; Jesse Quatse – assistant line coach; John Kosh – assistant guard coach; Ted Schmitt– freshman coach; Edmund Shedlosky– assistant freshman coach	Support staff: Frank Carver – publicity director/ interim athletic director; Dr. Ralph Shanor – team physician; Dr. Dan Dickinson – team physician; Howard Waite – trainer; Bill Haines – equipment manager; Velton Castrodale – student manager

== Roster ==
1948 Pittsburgh Panthers football roster
Player	Position	Games	Weight	Height	Class	Prep School	Hometown
William Abraham (USN)*	halfback	9	195	5 ft 8 in	junior	Jeannette H. S.	Jeanette, PA
Bernard Barkouskie*	guard	8	190	5 ft 10 in	junior	Wilkes-Barre H. S.	Kulpmont, PA
Robert Becker (AC)*	fullback	9	190	6 ft	junior	Westinghouse H. S.	Pittsburgh, PA
James Black (USMC)	tackle	0	200	6 ft	sophomore	Altoona H. S.	Altoona, PA
Michael Boldin (Army)*	tackle	9	210	6 ft	sophomore	Johnstown H. S.	Johnstown, PA
Nick Bolkovac*	tackle	9	210	6 ft 1 in	sophomore	Youngstown H. S.	Youngstown, OH
Fred Botti (USN)	quarterback	0	195	6 ft	junior	Connellsville H. S.	Connellsville, PA
William Bruno (USMC)*	halfback	2	180	5 ft 11 in	junior	Penn H. S.	Verona, PA
Frank Capello (Army)	end	1	180	6 ft	junior	Elwood City H. S.	Elwood City, PA
Louis Cecconi*	halfback	8	165	5 ft 7 in	junior	Donora H. S.	Donora, PA
Joe Cherol (USN)	halfback	3	175	5 ft 6 in	junior	Youngstown H. S.	Youngstown, OH
Fred Cimino (Army)	tackle	0	190	6 ft	sophomore	Weirton H. S.	Weirton, WV
Ralph Coleman (USN)*	tackle	9	210	6 ft	senior	Ambridge H. S.	Ambridge, PA
William Coury (AC) *	guard	0	185	5 ft 9 in	sophomore	Arnold H.S.	Arnold, PA
Walter Cummins (Army) *	quarterback	9	205	6 ft 1 in	senior	Greensburg H. S.	Greensburg, PA
Sam DeFede	tackle	0	200	6 ft	sophomore	Martins Ferry H. S.	Martins Ferry, OH
James Delong (USN)	tackle	0	215	6 ft 2 in	senior	Reading H. S.	Reading, OH
Carl DePasqua*	quarterback	8	170	5 ft 9 in	junior	Williamsport. H.S.	Williamsport, PA
Nick DeRosa*	end	8	185	6 ft	sophomore	Donora H. S.	Donora, PA
Anthony DiMatteo (AC)	halfback	1	185	5 ft 11 in	senior	Perry H. S.	Pittsburgh, PA
Donald Fisher (USMC)*	center	7	185	5 ft 10 in	senior	Williamsport H. S.	Williamsport, PA
Wilbur Forsythe (AC)*	tackle	5	210	6 ft 3 in	senior	East Huntingdon H. S.	East Huntingdon, PA
Peter Fuderich (USN)*	quarterback	8	175	5 ft 7 in	senior	Aliquippa H. S.	Aliquippa, PA
George Gallino	tackle	0	200	6 ft	sophomore	Freeport H. S.	Freeport, PA
Gene Gaugler (USMC)	quarterback	0	200	6 ft 1 in	junior	Beaver Falls H. S.	Beaver Falls, PA
Ted Geremsky (USN)*	end	7	205	6 ft 4 in	sophomore	Braddock H. S.	Braddock, PA
Flint Greene*	guard	7	200	5 ft 9 in	sophomore	New Kensington H. S.	New Kensington, PA
Sam Haddad (USMC)*	tackle	0	215	6 ft 3 in	junior	New Castle H. S.	New Castle, PA
William Hardisty (USN)*	halflback	8	210	6 ft 2 in	junior	Langley H. S.	Pittsburgh, PA
Harry Hollihan	end	0	200	6 ft 1 in	sophomore	Glenshaw H. S.	Glenshaw, PA
Robert Hum	end	0	180	5 ft 11 in	junior	Columbiana H. S.	Columbiana, OH
Ray Johnson (Army)	tackle	1	210	6 ft 3 in	freshman	Oliver H. S.	Pittsburgh, PA
David Karanovich	guard	1	195	6 ft 2 in	sophomore	Irwin H. S.	Irwin, PA
Andrew Kisiday (USN)	guard	3	188	5 ft 11 in	junior	Ambridge H. S.	Ambridge, PA
John LaFrankie (USMC)	guard	0	195	5 ft 11 in	junior	Elizabeth H. S.	Elizabeth, PA
Lindaro Lauro (AC)*	halfback	5	195	5 ft 10 in	junior	New Castle H. S.	New Castle, PA
Robert Lee (USMC)*	halfback	9	185	5 ft 10 in	junior	New Castle H. S.	New Castle, PA
John Masarick	quarterback	0	195	6 ft	sophomore	Har-Brack H. S.	Tarentum, PA
George Matich (S)	quarterback	0	180	5 ft 11 in	junior	Clairton H. S.	Clairton, PA
Mark Maystrovich (Army)	quarterback	0	200	6 ft	sophomore	Irwin H. S.	Irwin, PA
William McPeak (USN)*	end	9	195	6 ft	senior	New Castle H. S.	New Castle, PA
Louis Melillo*	quarterback	8	180	5 ft 10 in	junior	Kittanning H. S.	Kittanning, PA
Robert Mihm*	tackle	9	220	6 ft	sophomore	Westinghouse H. S.	Pittsburgh, PA
Malcolm Morgan (Army)	halfback	0	175	5 ft 11 in	sophomore	Charleroi H.S.	Charleroi, PA
Joseph O'Bara (USN)	halfback	2	165	5 ft 9 in	sophomore	Johnstown H. S.	Johnstown, PA
Russell Phillips	end	1	175	6 ft	sophomore	Sharon H. S.	Sharon, PA
Laurice Pierce	guard	2	175	5 ft 9 in	sophomore	Jeannette H. S.	Jeannette, PA
Robert Plotz*	tackle	8	205	6 ft	junior	Martins Ferry H. S.	Martins Ferry, OH
Emil Rader (Army)	halfback	2	200	5 ft 11 in	sophomore	Wheeling H. S.	Boggs Run, WVA
Leonard Radnor*	center	9	185	5 ft 10 in	junior	Plymouth H. S.	Plymouth, PA
George Radosevich*	center	6	200	6 ft 2 in	sophomore	Brentwood H. S.	Brentwood, PA
Anthony Razzano (Army)	guard	1	185	5 ft 8 in	junior	New Castle H. S.	New Castle, PA
James Robinson (Army)*	halfback	8	190	5 ft 11 in	junior	Connellsville H. S.	Connellsville, PA
William Samer	end	1	185	6 ft 1 in	junior	Donora H. S.	Donora, PA
Ralph Short	tackle	0	195	6 ft	junior	Martins Ferry H. S.	Martins Ferry, OH
Leo Skladany*	end	9	205	6 ft 1 in	senior	Plymouth H. S.	Plymouth, PA
Jack Smodic*	halfback	5	165	5 ft 11 in	senior	German Twp. H. S.	Adah, PA
George Steingraber*	center	4	185	6 ft 1 in	sophomore	St. George H. S.	Pittsburgh, PA
Earl Sumpter*	guard	6	175	5 ft 10 in	junior	Clairton H. S.	Clairton, PA
Charles Thomas*	guard	9	190	6 ft 3 in	junior	Dormont H. S.	Dormont, PA
Fred Thomas	tackle	0	195	5 ft 11 in	junior	Tarentum H. S.	Tarentum, PA
John Vrable	fullback	0	185	5 ft 11 in	sophomore	Greensburg H. S.	Greensburg, PA
Lee Ward (Army)	center	0	175	5 ft 11 in	junior	Mt. Lebanon H. S.	Mt. Lebanon, PA
Charles Yost*	guard	9	195	6 ft	sophomore	Youngstown H. S.	Youngstown, OH
* Letterman

== Game summaries ==
=== SMU ===
Week 1: SMU at Pitt

Team	1	2	3	4	Total
• SMU	7	7	6	13	33
Pitt	0	0	0	14	14

- Date: September 25, 1948
- Location: Pitt Stadium
  Pittsburgh, PA
- Game start: 2:00 p.m.
- Game attendance: 31,469
- Game weather: cool and partly cloudy
- Referee: Lloyd Larson (Wisconsin)

Scoring summary
1	SMU	Raleigh Blakely 13-yard pass from Doak Walker (Walker kick)	SMU 7–0
2	SMU	Walker 60-yard pass from Gil Johnson (Walker kick)	SMU 14–0
3	SMU	Walker 74-yard punt return (kick missed)	SMU 20–0
4	PITT	Bill Bruno 16-yard pass from Bimbo Cecconi (Nick Bolkovac kick)	SMU 20–7
4	SMU	Blakely 40-yard pass from Johnson (Walker kick)	SMU 27–7
4	SMU	Kyle Rote 47-yard pass from Johnson (kick missed)	SMU 33–7
4	PITT	Bill McPeak 13-yard pass from Bobby Lee (Nick Bolkovac kick)	SMU 33–14

On September 25, the Panthers opened the season at Pitt Stadium against the SMU Mustangs. Pitt led the all-time series 2–0–1. Coach Matty Bell's squad returned 15 lettermen from their 1947 unbeaten season (9–0–2), and were ranked No. 3 in the preseason. 1948 Heisman Trophy winner, Doak Walker, and future All-American, Kyle Rote, led the Mustangs offense.

Coach Milligan had 10 returning players in the starting line-up along with sophomore tackle Nick Bolkovac. The Panthers were a 20-point underdog.

The SMU Mustangs, on their seventh attempt, won their first game in the state of Pennsylvania by defeating the Panthers 33 to 14. Doak Walker scored two touchdowns, passed for a third and booted 3 of 5 extra points. End Raleigh Blakely caught 2 touchdown passes and Kyle Rote capped the Mustangs scoring with a 47-yard touchdown reception from Gil Johnson. Pitt managed to score 2 touchdowns in the final period. Bimbo Cecconi hooked up with Bill Bruno for a 16-yard touchdown pass, and Bobby Lee threw a 13-yard scoring toss to Bill McPeak to cap an 88-yard drive.

The Pitt starting lineup for the game against SMU was Leo Skladany (left end), Nick Bolkovac (left tackle), Bernie Barkouskie (left guard), Len Radnor (center), Michael Boldin (right guard), Robert Plotz (right tackle), Bill McPeak (right end), Walt Cummins (quarterback), Bobby Lee (left halfback), Bill Bruno (right halfback) and Bill Abraham (fullback). Substitutes appearing in the game for the Panthers were Nick DeRosa, Earl Sumpter, Robert Mihm, Ralph Coleman, Charles Thomas, Charles Yost, Anthony Razzano, Laurice Pierce, Flint Greene, George Steingraber, Donald Fisher, William Hardisty, Bimbo Cecconi, Carl DePasqua, Louis Meillo, Robert Becker, Peter Fuderich and Joseph Cherol.

=== Notre Dame ===
Week 2: Notre Dame at Pitt

Team	1	2	3	4	Total
• Notre Dame	7	21	6	6	40
Pitt	0	0	0	0	0

- Date: October 2, 1948
- Location: Pitt Stadium
  Pittsburgh, PA
- Game start: 2:00 p.m.
- Game attendance: 63,000
- Game weather: sunny and hot
- Referee: George Rennix (Minnesota)

Scoring summary
1	ND	Leon Hart 6-yard pass from Frank Tripucka (Steve Oracko kick)	ND 7–0
2	ND	Emil Sitko 2-yard run (Oracko kick)	ND 14–0
2	ND	Frank Spaniel 1-yard run (Oracko kick)	ND 21–0
2	ND	Jack Landry (Nick Bolkovac kick)	ND 28–0
3	ND	Lancaster Smith 85-yard punt return ( kick missed)	ND 34–0
4	ND	Bill McKillip 9-yard run (kick missed)	ND 40–0

For Pitt's second home game, Frank Leahy brought his Notre Dame Fighting Irish to Pitt Stadium. The Irish were 1–0 on the season, having defeated Purdue 28–27 in their home opener. The Irish line-up had three consensus All-Americans – end Leon Hart, guard Bill Fischer and halfback, Emil Sitko. Guard Marty Wendell and end Jim Martin also received some All-America recognition. Notre Dame led the all-time series 10–6–1, and had outscored the Panthers 211–15 in the previous 5 games.

Coach Milligan decided to alter the Pitt line-up against the 26–point favorite Irish. On the line, Don Fisher replaced Len Radnor at center, and Charles Thomas and Charles Yost started at guard instead of Bernie Barkouskie and Mike Boldin. In the backfield, Pete Fuderich took over at quarterback for Walt Cummins, and Bob Becker replaced Bill Abraham at fullback.

The Irish were not impressed with the Panthers line-up changes and routed Pitt 40–0. Notre Dame led 28–0 at halftime, and Coach Leahy used his reserves for the second half. The Pitt offense threatened the Irish goal line three times. After the first Irish score, Bobby Lee and Jimmy Robinson combined for a 60-yard lateral rush to the Irish 9-yard line. The Irish defense held, then punted and the Panthers came right back to the Notre Dame 15-yard line. The Notre Dame defense held again. Late in the game, the Panthers offense advanced 75 yards, but Jimmy Robinson was tackled on the 6–yard line on the last play of the game.

The Pitt starting lineup for the game against Notre Dame was Leo Skladany (left end), Nick Bolkovac (left tackle), Charles Yost (left guard), Don Fisher (center), Charles Thomas (right guard), Robert Plotz (right tackle), Bill McPeak (right end), Pete Fuderich (quarterback), Bobby Lee (left halfback), Jimmy Robinson (right halfback) and Bob Becker (fullback). Substitutes appearing in the game for Pitt were Earl Sumpter, Nick DeRosa, Ted Geremsky, Russell Phillips, Frank Capello, Robert Mihm, Ralph Coleman, Ray Johnson, George Radosevich, Bernie Barkouskie, Mike Boldin, Len Radnor, George Steingraber, Bimbo Cecconi, Louis Melillo, Tony DeMatteo, Bill Abraham, Walt Cummins, Joseph O'Bara, Jack Smodic, Carl DePasqua, William Hardisty and Joseph Cherol.

=== West Virginia ===
Week 3: West Virginia at Pitt

Team	1	2	3	4	Total
West Virginia	0	0	6	0	6
• Pitt	7	7	2	0	16

- Date: October 9, 1948
- Location: Pitt Stadium
  Pittsburgh, PA
- Game start: 2:00 p.m.
- Game attendance: 18,401
- Game weather: partly cloudy
- Referee: Francis Keating (Fitchburg)

Scoring summary
1	PITT	Leo Skladany 14-yard pass from Bimbo Cecconi (Nick Bolkovac kick)	PITT 7–0
2	PITT	Jimmy Robinson 5-yard run (Bolkovac kick)	PITT 14–0
3	WVU	Pete Zinaich 11-yard run ( kick missed)	PITT 14–6
3	PITT	Bernie Barkouskie tackled Vic Bonfeli in the end zone for a safety	PITT 16–6

On October 9, Pitt and West Virginia engaged in the forty-first edition of the Backyard Brawl. The Panthers led the series 30–9–1, but the Mountaineers broke their 15-game losing streak in 1947 by defeating Pitt 17–2. The Mountaineers, led by first-year coach Dudley DeGroot, came into this game undefeated (3–0), having beaten Waynesburg, Wooster and Temple.

Coach Milligan's Panthers were healthy, but he replaced Pete Fuderich at quarterback with Louis Melillo. Pitt was a 3–point underdog, but had not lost back-to-back games to the Mountaineers since the 1922 and 1923 seasons.

In front of 18,401 fans, the Panthers notched their first win of the season 16–6. In the first quarter, Leo Skladany recovered a Charley Becca fumble on the Mountaineers 36–yard line. Five plays later, Bimbo Cecconi connected with Leo Skladany on a 14–yard touchdown pass. Nick Bolkovac added the extra point. In the second quarter, West Virginia punter Len Bellas shanked a 19–yard punt from his own 18–yard line. Two pass plays advanced the ball to the 5–yard line, from where Jimmy Joe Robinson scored on a reverse. Bolkovac added the placement. Early in the second half the Mountaineers drove 56–yards, with Pete Zinaich carrying the ball the final 11–yards for the score. Pitt guard Bernie Barkouskie tackled Vic Bonfeli in the end zone for a safety to cap the scoring. The Mountaineers finished the season with a 9–3 record.

The Pitt starting lineup for the game against West Virginia was Leo Skladany (left end), Nick Bolkovac (left tackle), Charles Yost (guard), Don Fisher (center), Charles Thomas (right guard), Robert Plotz (right tackle), Bill McPeak (right end), Louis Melillo (quarterback), Bobby Lee (left halfback), Jimmy Robinson (right halfback) and Bob Becker (fullback). Substitutes appearing in the game for Pitt were Earl Sumpter, Ted Geremski, Robert Mihm, Ralph Coleman, George Radosevich, Bernie Barkouskie, Len Radnor, Mike Boldin, Nick DeRosa, Walt Cummins, Pete Fuderich, Bimbo Cecconi, Bill Bruno, Lindaro Lauro, William Hardisty, Jack Smodic, Emil Rader, Carl DePasqua and Bill Abraham.

=== Marquette ===
Week 4: Marquette at Pitt

Team	1	2	3	4	Total
Marquette	0	0	7	0	7
• Pitt	0	0	7	14	21

- Date: October 16, 1948
- Location: Pitt Stadium
  Pittsburgh, PA
- Game start: 2:00 p.m.
- Game attendance: 15,830
- Game weather: cloudy, warm and windy
- Referee: Jay Berwanger (Chicago)

Scoring summary
3	PITT	Bob Becker 1-yard run (Nick Bolkovac kick)	PITT 7–0
3	MARQ	William Hickey 1-yard run (Howdy Miller kick)	TIE 7–7
4	PITT	Nick DeRosa 82-yard pass from Bimbo Cecconi ( Bolkovac kick)	PITT 14–7
4	PITT	Jack Smodic 45-yard interception return	PITT 21–7

The fourth game of the season was against the Marquette Hilltoppers. In their only previous meeting, in 1946, Pitt edged Marquette (7–6). Coach Frank J. Murray's squad was 1–2 on the season. They lost to Iowa (14–12) and Detroit (34–6), and beat St. Louis (47–7).

After the first three games, Pitt halfback Louis “Bimbo” Cecconi was third in the East in total offense with 401 yards in 80 plays. Due to injuries, the Panthers lost guard Tony Razzano and halfback Bill Bruno for the season. In addition, plus tackles, Sam Haddad, Ralph Short and Wilbur Forsythe, were not available for this contest. Starting guard Bernie Barkouskie was back in the line-up. The favored Panthers got an attendance boost by selling 3,500 discounted tickets for High School Day.

The Panthers won their second game in a row 21–7, by out-dueling Marquette in the second half. It took Pitt seven plays to score in the second half. A 64-yard pass from Bobby Lee to Jimmy Robinson advanced the ball to the Marquette 7-yard line. Bob Becker scored from the 1-yard line on second down and Nick Bolkovac added the extra point. Marquette answered with a 50-yard kick-off return and four rushes to tie the score. Bill Hickey scored the touchdown on a 1-yard plunge and Howard Miller added the point. The Panthers gained possession on their 15-yard line to start the final period. On second down, Bimbo Cecconi threw an 82-yard touchdown pass to Nick DeRosa and Bolkovac's kick was good. With less than a minute remaining in the game, Pitt's Jack Smodic intercepted a deflected Dick Melka pass and raced 45-yards for the final touchdown. Bolkovac's kick made the final: Pitt 21– Marquette 7.

After the West Virginia victory, the Pitt students and fans tore down the goalposts. The powers to be replaced them with wooden goal posts for the Marquette game. The Pittsburgh faithful tore them down again in celebration.

The Pitt starting lineup for the game against Marquette was Leo Skladany (left end), Nick Bolkovac (left tackle), Bernie Barkouskie (left guard), Don Fisher (center), Charles Thomas (right guard), Robert Plotz (right tackle), Bill McPeak (right end), Louis Melillo (quarterback), Bobby Lee (left halfback), Jimmy Robinson (right halfback) and Bob Becker (fullback). Substitutes appearing in the game for Pitt were Ted Geremsky, Nick DeRosa, Earl Sumpter, Robert Mihm, George Radosevich, Charles Yost, Flint Greene, Len Radnor, Mike Boldin, Ralph Coleman, William Samer, Pete Fuderich, Walt Cummins, Bimbo Cecconi, Jack Smodic, Lindaro Lauro, Bill Abraham and Carl DePasqua.

=== Indiana ===
Week 5: Indiana at Pitt

Team	1	2	3	4	Total
Indiana	0	0	7	7	14
• Pitt	7	7	0	7	21

- Date: October 23, 1948
- Location: Pitt Stadium
  Pittsburgh, PA
- Game start: 2:00 p.m.
- Game attendance: 17,118
- Game weather: cloudy
- Referee: Lyle Clarno (Bradley)

Scoring summary
1	PITT	Bill McPeak 23-yard pass from Jimmy Robinson (Nick Bolkovac kick)	PITT 7–0
2	PITT	Bob Becker 2-yard run (Bolkovac kick)	PITT 14–0
3	IND	John McDonnell 60-yard pass from George Taliaferro ( George Parker kick)	PITT 14–7
4	IND	George Taliaferro 80-yard pass from Nick Sebek (Parker kick)	TIE 14–14
4	PITT	Jimmy Robinson 62-yard pass from Bimbo Cecconi (Bolkovac kick)	PITT 21–14

On October 23, the Panthers played the Indiana Hoosiers. Indiana led the all-time series 5–0, and had outscored the Panthers 146–19. First-year Coach Clyde Smith's squad was 2–2. They beat Wisconsin (35–7) and Iowa (7–0) to open their season and then lost to TCU (7–6) and Ohio State (17–0). Indiana back George Taliaferro was named to the defensive first team All-America by the International News Service.

The Pitt fans tore down the goalposts for the third straight game, after the Panthers beat the Hoosiers in the final minute 21–14. The Pitt offense drove 62-yards after the opening kick-off and scored on a 23-yard pass from Jimmy Robinson to end Bill McPeak. In the second period, McPeak recovered a George Taliaferro fumble and the Pitt offense advanced the ball 71-yards, with Bob Becker carrying it into the end zone from the 2-yard line. Nick Bolkovac kicked both extra points and Pitt led 14–0 at halftime. Early in the third quarter, John McConnell scored on a 60-yard pass from Taliaferro. Seven plays into the final stanza, Taliaferro caught a screen pass from Nick Sebek, and he raced 80-yards for the tying touchdown. George Parker converted both placements. With one minute and ten seconds remaining in the game, Bimbo Cecconi fair caught Taliaferro's punt on the Panther 38-yard line. On first down Cecconi dropped back and threw a ″Hail Mary″ pass to Robinson. The Pitt News reported: "Jimmy Joe juggled the ball, wheeled caught it again and sped off into the promised land with a grin on his face that extended from one side of the Stadium to the other."

The Pitt starting lineup for the game against Indiana was Leo Skladany (left end), Nick Bolkovac (left tackle), Bernie Barkouskie (left guard), Don Fisher (center), Mike Boldin (right guard), Robert Plotz (right tackle), Bill McPeak (right end), Louis Melillo (quarterback), Bobby Lee (left halfback), Jimmy Robinson (right halfback) and Bob Becker (fullback). Substitutes appearing in the game for Pitt were Ted Germenski, Nick DeRosa, Robert Mihm, Flint Greene, Ralph Coleman, Wilbur Forsythe, Charles Yost, Andy Kisiday, Charles Thomas, Len Radnor, Walt Cummins, Pete Federich, Bimbo Cecconi, Joseph O'Bara, Bill Abraham, William Hardisty, Jack Smodic and Carl DePaqua.

=== at Western Reserve ===
Week 6: Pitt at Western Reserve

Team	1	2	3	4	Total
• Pitt	7	0	6	7	20
Western Reserve	0	0	0	0	0

- Date: October 30, 1948
- Location: League Park
  Cleveland, OH
- Game start: 2:00 p.m.
- Game attendance: 12,000
- Game weather: partly cloudy
- Referee: Paul Cain (Xavier)

Scoring summary
1	PITT	Bob Becker 12-yard run (Nick Bolkovac kick)	PITT 7–0
3	PITT	Bob Becker 2-yard run ( kick miss)	PITT 13–0
4	PITT	Bob Becker 3-yard run ( Bolkovac kick)	PITT 20–0

The Panthers first road game was against Western Reserve University on October 30, in Cleveland, OH. The Panthers led the all-time series 2–0 and had outscored the Red Cats 84–0. First-year coach Mike Scarry's squad was 1–3–1 on the season. They beat Butler and tied Kent State, and lost to Western Michigan, Miami (OH), and Ohio U. This was Homecoming at Western Reserve and the game was televised.

Coach Milligan was named 'Coach of the Week' by the United Press. Pitt center, Don Fisher, and guard, Bernie Barkouskie, injured in the Indiana game were replaced in the starting line-up by Len Radnor and Charles Yost. Louis 'Bimbo' Cecconi was ranked eighth in the country with 666 yards of total offense in 124 plays.

The Panthers made it four wins in a row by beating the Red Cats 20–0. Pitt running back Bob Becker scored all three touchdowns and Nick Bolkovac converted two extra points (the third was blocked). Western threatened to score twice. The Red Cats kicked off to start the second half, and Western end, Leo Spann, recovered the loose ball on the Panthers 6-yard line. The Panthers defense held and took over on the 2-yard line. Late in the game, Western recovered Bill Abraham's fumble on the Panther 37-yard line. They advanced the ball to the Panther 12-yard line as time ran out. The Panthers out-gained the Red Cats 238 yards to 53 on the ground.

The Pitt starting lineup for the game against Western Reserve was Leo Skladany (left end), Nick Bolkovac (left tackle), Charles Yost (left guard), Len Radnor (center), Charles Thomas (right guard), Robert Platz (right tackle), Bill McPeak (right end), Louis Melillo (quarterback), Bobby Lee (left halfback), Bill Abraham (right halfback) and Bob Becker (fullback). Substitutes appearing in the game for Pitt were Nick DeRosa, Ted Geremsky, Flint Greene, Robert Mihm, Andy Kisaday, George Steingraber, Mike Boldin, Wilbur Forsythe, Ralph Coleman, Earl Sumpter, Walt Cummins, Pete Fuderich, William Hardisty, Bobby Lee, Rader, Jack Smodic, Jimmy Robinson, Carl DePasqua and Joseph Cherol.

=== at Ohio State ===
Week 7: Pitt at Ohio State

Team	1	2	3	4	Total
Pitt	0	0	0	0	0
• Ohio State	0	20	21	0	41

- Date: November 6, 1948
- Location: Ohio Stadium
  Columbus, OH
- Game start: 2:00 p.m.
- Game attendance: 68,966
- Game weather: cloudy
- Referee: Mike Layden (Notre Dame)

Scoring summary
2	OSU	Joe Whisler 1-yard run (kick missed)	OSU 6–0
2	OSU	Jerry Krall 3-yard run ( James Hague kick)	OSU 13–0
2	OSU	Alex Verdona 10-yard pass from Pandel Savic ( Hague kick)	OSU 20–0
3	OSU	Whisler 7-yard run ( Hague kick )	OSU 27–0
3	OSU	Sonny Gandee 22-yard interception return ( Hague kick )	OSU 34–0
3	OSU	Hague 27-yard pass from George Wertz ( Hague kick)	OSU 41–0

On November 6, the Panthers travelled to Columbus, OH to take on the Ohio State Buckeyes. Wes Fesler's squad was 4–2. They beat Missouri, USC, Indiana and Wisconsin. They lost to Big Nine foes Iowa and Northwestern. The Buckeyes led the series 8–3–1, but were still smarting from last season, when the Panthers upset them for Pitt's only victory of 1947. Coach Fesler was worried: “The mental condition of my squad is going to be alright. It's the physical condition that has me worried.”

The two-touchdown underdog Panthers stayed at the Deshler-Wallick Hotel, and the Buckeyes spent the night there also. The Panthers and Buckeyes Jayvee teams played a game prior to the varsity attraction. Louis 'Bimbo' Cecconi was sixteenth nationally in total offense with 735 yards in 134 plays. He rushed for 216 yards and passed for 519 after 6 games.

The Panthers four game win streak ended as the Buckeyes got their revenge 41–0. The Buckeyes scored three touchdowns in both the second and third quarters. Five players scored touchdowns – Joe Whisler (2), Gerry Krall, Alex Verdova, Sonny Gandee and James Hague. Hague made 5 of 6 extra points. The Panthers threatened twice in the first period, but their offense stalled on the Ohio 16-yard line, and again on the Buckeye 23-yard line. The Ohio offense racked up 15 first downs and 370 total yards. An 80-yard punt return by Ohio back Jimmy Clark was negated by an off-side penalty, and the Buckeyes were on the Pitt 1-yard line as the game ended, or the score could have been worse.

The Pitt starting lineup for the game against Ohio State was Leo Skladany (left end), Nick Bolkovac (left tackle), Bernie Barkouskie (left guard), Len Radnor (center), Charles Thomas (right tackle), Robert Plotz (right guard), Bill McPeak (right end), Walt Cummins (quarterback), Bimbo Cecconi (left halfback), Jimmy Robinson (right halfback) and Carl DePasqua (fullback). Substitutes appearing in the game for Pitt were Earl Sumpter, Ted Geremsky, Nick DeRosa, Flint Greene, Robert Mihm, Ralph Coleman, Wilbur Forsythe, Charles Yost, Andy Kisaday, Earl Thomas, Mike Boldin, Laurice Pierce, George Steingraber, George Radosevich, Louis Melillo, Pete Fuderich, Bobby Lee, Lindaro Lauro, William Hardisty, Bill Abraham and Bob Becker.

=== at Purdue ===
Week 8: Pitt at Purdue

Team	1	2	3	4	Total
• Pitt	7	7	0	6	20
Purdue	0	6		7	13

- Date: November 13, 1948
- Location: Ross-Ade Stadium
  Lafayette, OH
- Game start: 2:30 p.m.
- Game attendance: 30,000–35,000
- Game weather: cloudy
- Referee: George Rennix (Minnesota)

Scoring summary
1	PITT	Carl DePasqua 1-yard run (Nick Bolkovac kick)	PITT 7–0
2	PURD	Harry Szulborski 56-yard run ( kick blocked)	PITT 7–6
2	PITT	Jimmy Robinson 100-yard kick-off return ( Bolkovac kick)	PITT 14–6
4	PITT	Robinson 8-yard run ( kick missed )	PITT 20–6
4	PURD	Kenny Gorgal 82-yard punt return ( Hague kick )	PITT 20–13

The final road game of the season was to Lafayette, IN to play the Purdue Boilermakers. Purdue led the series 4–0, outscoring the Panthers 72–8. After leading the Boilermakers to a 5–4 record in his initial season at the helm, Coach Stuart Holcomb's present squad was 2–5 on the season. His lineup had two players who received All-America recognition – tackle Phillip O'Reilly and halfback Harry Szulborski.

The Panthers injured list grew to 15 after the Ohio State game. Third-string center, George Steingraber, was lost for the season with a fractured cheekbone. Starting center, Don Fisher, was nursing a knee injury, and his back-up, Len Radnor, had an ankle sprain. Fourth-string center, George Radosevich, was named starter. Ralph Coleman replaced Robert Plotz (leg injury) at right tackle. Left end, Leo Skladany, right guard, Charles Thomas, halfback, Jack Smodic and quarterback, Pete Fuderich, all had hip problems. Tackles Ralph Coleman and Wilbur Forsythe had sore ankles. Fullback, Bob Becker, and guards, Laurice Pierce and Mike Boldin were just sore all over.

Coach Milligan's banged-up Panthers defied the oddsmakers, and ran their record to 5–3, by upsetting the two-touchdown favored Boilermakers 20–13. Purdue made 13 first downs to the Panthers 7. Purdue had 239-yards rushing (Harry Szulborski had 133) and 40-yards passing, while the Panthers managed 96-yards rushing and 21-yards passing. The Panthers scored first. Purdue halfback, Roger Raggatz, fumbled the opening kick-off and Pitt end, Ted Geremsky, recovered on the Purdue 25-yard line. The Panther offense drove the ball to the 7-yard line. On fourth down, Bimbo Cecconi was tackled on the 1-yard line. Purdue halfback, George Punzelt punted out to the 42-yard line, and Cecconi returned it to the 1-yard line. Carl DePasqua vaulted into the end zone for the touchdown and Nick Bolkovac converted the extra point. Purdue answered in the second period, when halfback Harry Szulborski ran 56-yards through the porous Pitt defense. Pitt guard, Bernie Barkouskie blocked Rudy Trbovich's placement and Pitt led 7–6 with just over 3 minutes left in the half. Trbovich's kick-off went to Jimmy Robinson, and he ran goal line to goal line for a 100-yard touchdown. Bolkovac added the placement. The halftime score: Pitt 14–Purdue 6. The third period was scoreless. In the final stanza Bolkovac blocked a Purdue punt and Bill McPeak recovered for the Panthers on the Purdue 6-yard line. Pitt halfback Robinson scored on a reverse. Bolkovac made the extra point but the Panthers were off-sides and he missed the retry. With less than a minute to play, Purdue back Kenny Gorgal returned an Andy Hardisty punt 82-yards for a touchdown and Trbovich added the placement. The game ended with McPeak recovering the on-side kick.

The Pitt starting lineup for the Purdue game was Ted Geremsky (left end), Nick Bolkovac (left tackle), Bernie Barkouskie (left guard), George Radosevich (center), Mike Boldin (right guard), Ralph Coleman (right tackle), Bill McPeak (right end), Lois Melillo (quarterback), Bimbo Cecconi (left halfback), Jimmy Robinson (right halfback) and Carl DePasqua (fullback). Substitutes appearing in the game for Pitt were Leo Skladany, Nick DeRosa, Flint Greene, Robert Mihm, Wilbur Forsythe, Charles Yost, Charles Thomas, David Karanovich, Don Fisher, Len Radnor, Walt Cummins, Pete Fuderich, Bobby Lee, William Hardisty, Lindaro Lauro, Bill Abraham and Bob Becker.

=== Penn State ===
Week 9: Penn State at Pitt

Team	1	2	3	4	Total
Penn State	0	0	0	0	0
• Pitt	0	0	0	7	7

- Date: November 20, 1948
- Location: Pitt Stadium
  Pittsburgh, PA
- Game start: 2:00 p.m.
- Game attendance: 49,444–51,075
- Game weather: cloudy, windy and cold
- Referee: H. D. Dayhoff (Bucknell)

Scoring summary
4	PITT	Nick Bolkovac 23-yard interception (Bolkovac kick)	PITT 7–0

On November 20, Pitt closed out its season against the undefeated and sixth-ranked Penn State Nittany Lions. Pitt led the all-time series 27–18–2. Coach Bob Higgins squad was 6–0–1 on the season. Their only blemish was a 14–14 tie with Michigan State. The Lions were on a 17-game unbeaten streak, having suffered their last loss to Pitt in final game of the 1946 season. Halfbacks, Fran Rogel and Elwood Petchel, and linemen, Sam Tamburo and Paul Kelly received All-America recognition.

The Panthers were three touchdown underdogs. Coach Milligan had starters Leo Skladany (end) and Don Fisher (center) back in the lineup. Bobby Lee replaced Louis Melillo at quarterback. Nine seniors on the Panthers squad played their final college game: Bill McPeak and Leo Skladany, ends; Wilbur Forsythe and Ralph Coleman, tackles; Don Fisher, center; Walt Cummins and Pete Fuderich, quarterbacks; and Tony Matteo and Jack Smodic, halfbacks. On Friday night, Coach Milligan sequestered the squad at the Penn-Lincoln Hotel in Wilkinsburg.

The Pitt Panthers eked out a 7–0 upset victory. They defied logic for the second week in a row by dashing Penn State's hopes for a major bowl bid. Pitt earned 4 first downs and gained 77 total yards. Penn State had 15 first downs and 240 total yards. State threatened in each quarter, but the Panther defense held. The closest the Lons advanced into Pitt territory before the final stanza was the 16-yard line. Early in the fourth period, Pitt halfback, William Hardisty punted into the end zone. On third down Lion quarterback, Elwood Petchel's pass was deflected by Pitt tackle Ralph Coleman into teammate Nick Bolkovac's hands and he ran untouched 23-yards to the end zone. Bolkovac's placement was good and Pitt led 7–0 with 12 minutes remaining. Penn State advanced the ball deep into Pitt territory but Bobby Lee intercepted Petchel's pass on the 5-yard line. The Panthers were forced to punt. Jimmie Robinson intercepted another Petchel toss, but the officials called pass interference on the Panthers 21-yard line. On first down, Pitt defensive back Carl DePasqua batted down a pass in the end zone. On second down, Petchel found Larry Cooney for a first down completion on the Pitt 11-yard line with 30 seconds remaining. Petchel threw to John Smidansky on the 2-yard line. On the last play of the game Fran Rogel went through tackle and was stopped on the 1-yard line. The Panthers fans once again tore down the goal posts.

The Pitt starting lineup for the game against Penn State was Leo Skladany (left end), Nick Bolkovac (left tackle), Bernie Barkouskie (left guard), Don Fisher (center), Mike Boldin (right guard), Ralph Coleman (right tackle), Bill McPeak (right end), Bobby Lee (quarterback), Bimbo Cecconi (left halfback), Jimmy Robinson (right halfback), and Carl DePasqua (fullback). Substitutes appearing in the game for Pitt were Ted Geremsky, Flint Greene, Robert Mihm, Charles Yost, Len Radnor, George Radosevich, Charles Thomas, Wilbur Forsythe, Robert Plotz, Pete Fuderich, Walt Cummins, Lindaro Lauro, Bill Hardisty, Bill Abraham and Bob Becker.

== Individual scoring summary ==
1948 Pittsburgh Panthers scoring summary
Player	Touchdowns	Extra points	Field goals	Safety	Points
Bob Becker	5	0	0	0	30
Jimmy Joe Robinson	4	0	0	0	24
Nick Bolkovac	1	15	0	0	21
William McPeak	2	0	0	0	12
Bill Bruno	1	0	0	0	6
Leo Skladany	1	0	0	0	6
Nick DeRosa	1	0	0	0	6
Jack Smodic	1	0	0	0	6
Carl DePasqua	1	0	0	0	6
Bernie Barkouskie	0	0	0	1	2
Totals	17	15	0	1	119

== Postseason ==
William McPeak, Leo Skladaney, Nick Bolkovac, Louis Cecconi, Jimmy Robinson and Bernie Berkouskie received numerous All-East team and All-State team recognition.

On December 6, Navy Athletic Director, Tom Hamilton, officially accepted the job as Pitt Athletic Director. He took over on February 1, 1949 and held the position for 10 years.

== Team players drafted into the NFL ==
The following player was selected in the 1949 NFL draft.

Player	Position	Round	Pick	NFL club
Leo Skladany	end	17	171	Philadelphia Eagles
