= 1948 NYU Violets football team =

American college football season

1948 NYU Violets football
- Conference: Independent
- Record: 3–6
- Head coach: Edward Mylin (2nd season)
- Home stadium: Yankee Stadium

1948 Eastern major college football independents records
	Conf.			Overall
Team	W	L	T	W		L		T
No. 6 Army		–		8	–	0	–	1
Penn State		–		7	–	1	–	1
Villanova		–		8	–	2	–	1
Boston University		–		6	–	2	–	0
Boston College		–		5	–	2	–	2
Pittsburgh		–		6	–	3	–	0
Holy Cross		–		5	–	5	–	0
Colgate		–		3	–	6	–	0
Fordham		–		3	–	6	–	0
NYU		–		3	–	6	–	0
Temple		–		2	–	6	–	1
Duquesne		–		2	–	7	–	0
Syracuse		–		1	–	8	–	0
Rankings from AP Poll

The 1948 NYU Violets football team was an American football team that represented New York University as an independent during the 1948 college football season.

In their second season under head coach Edward "Hook" Mylin, the Violets compiled a 3–6 record, and were outscored 190–96.

NYU was ranked at No. 210 in the final Litkenhous Difference by Score System ratings for 1948.

The team played one home game at Yankee Stadium in The Bronx, with the rest of its schedule on the road. NYU played no games at its on-campus home field, Ohio Field in University Heights, Bronx

== Schedule ==
Date	Opponent	Site	Result	Attendance	Source
September 25	at Cornell	Schoellkopf Field; Ithaca, NY	L 6–47	14,000	
October 2	at Springfield)	Pratt Field; Springfield, MA	L 0–3	4,000	
October 9	at Brooklyn	Ebbets Field; Brooklyn, NY	W 21–7	15,000	
October 22	at Boston University	Fenway Park; Boston, MA	L 7–28	8,280	
October 30	at Lehigh	Taylor Stadium; Bethlehem, PA	W 21–20	9,000	
November 5	at Georgetown	Griffith Stadium; Washington, DC	L 6–13	5,892	
November 13	Rutgers	Yankee Stadium; Bronx, NY	L 0–40	4,000	
November 20	at Merchant Marine	Tomb Field; Kings Point, NY	W 35–6		
November 16	at Fordham	Polo Grounds; New York, NY	L 0–26	26,000	
