= 1948 Duquesne Dukes football team =

American college football season

1948 Duquesne Dukes football
- Conference: Independent
- Record: 2–7
- Head coach: Kass Kovalcheck (2nd season)
- Home stadium: Forbes Field

1948 Eastern major college football independents records
	Conf.			Overall
Team	W	L	T	W		L		T
No. 6 Army		–		8	–	0	–	1
Penn State		–		7	–	1	–	1
Villanova		–		8	–	2	–	1
Boston University		–		6	–	2	–	0
Boston College		–		5	–	2	–	2
Pittsburgh		–		6	–	3	–	0
Holy Cross		–		5	–	5	–	0
Colgate		–		3	–	6	–	0
Fordham		–		3	–	6	–	0
NYU		–		3	–	6	–	0
Temple		–		2	–	6	–	1
Duquesne		–		2	–	7	–	0
Syracuse		–		1	–	8	–	0
Rankings from AP Poll

The 1948 Duquesne Dukes football team was an American football team that represented Duquesne University as an independent during the 1948 college football season. In its second season under head coach Kass Kovalcheck, Duquesne compiled a 2–7 record and was outscored by a total of 240 to 102.

Duquesne was ranked at No. 159 in the final Litkenhous Difference by Score System ratings for 1948.

== Schedule ==
Date	Time	Opponent	Site	Result	Attendance	Source
September 18		West Virginia Wesleyan	Forbes Field; Pittsburgh, PA	W 34–6		
September 26		vs. Alliance	Erie Stadium; Erie, PA	W 15–7	3,000	
October 1		at Villanova	Villanova Stadium; Villanova, PA	L 0–46		
October 8		at Alabama	Denny Stadium; Tuscaloosa, AL	L 6–48	20,000	
October 16	8:30 p.m.	Wake Forest	Forbes Field; Pittsburgh, PA	L 15–41	6,549	
October 30		at Ohio	Peden Stadium; Athens, OH	L 13–14		
November 6		Holy Cross	Forbes Field; Pittsburgh, PA	L 13–16	4,500	
November 16		NC State	Forbes Field; Pittsburgh, PA	L 6–20	4,610	
November 20		at No. 9 Clemson	Memorial Stadium; Clemson, SC	L 0–42	17,500	
Rankings from AP Poll released prior to the game
