= 1948 Boston University Terriers football team =

American college football season

1948 Boston University Terriers football
- Conference: Independent
- Record: 6–2
- Head coach: Aldo Donelli (2nd season)
- Captain: Robert W. Hatch
- Home stadium: Fenway Park

1948 Eastern major college football independents records
	Conf.			Overall
Team	W	L	T	W		L		T
No. 6 Army		–		8	–	0	–	1
Penn State		–		7	–	1	–	1
Villanova		–		8	–	2	–	1
Boston University		–		6	–	2	–	0
Boston College		–		5	–	2	–	2
Pittsburgh		–		6	–	3	–	0
Holy Cross		–		5	–	5	–	0
Colgate		–		3	–	6	–	0
Fordham		–		3	–	6	–	0
NYU		–		3	–	6	–	0
Temple		–		2	–	6	–	1
Duquesne		–		2	–	7	–	0
Syracuse		–		1	–	8	–	0
Rankings from AP Poll

The 1948 Boston University Terriers football team was an American football team that represented Boston University as an independent during the 1948 college football season. In its second season under head coach Aldo Donelli, the team compiled a 6–2 record and outscored their opponents by a total of 127 to 102. Robert W. Hatch was elected team captain.

Boston University was ranked at No. 102 in the final Litkenhous Difference by Score System ratings for 1948.

== Schedule ==
Date	Time	Opponent	Site	Result	Attendance	Source
September 25	8:00 p.m.	at Muhlenberg	Allentown High Stadium; Allentown, PA	L 0–27	15,000	
October 2		at Scranton	Scranton Stadium; Scranton, PA	W 13–0	5,000	
October 9		Colgate	Fenway Park; Boston, MA	W 14–13	4,598	
October 15		Temple	Fenway Park; Boston, MA	W 13–7	10,000	
October 22		NYU	Fenway Park; Boston, MA	W 28–7	8,280	
October 30	2:00 p.m.	Syracuse	Fenway Park; Boston, MA	W 12–7	7,257	
November 6		at Fordham	Polo Grounds; New York, NY	W 33–7	6,000	
November 20	2:00 p.m.	Iowa	Fenway Park; Boston, MA	L 14–34	12,848	
All times are in Eastern time
