= Jim Wulff =

American football player (1936–2000)

No. 32
- Positions: Defensive back, halfback

Personal information
- Born: March 22, 1936; Chicago, Illinois, U.S.
- Died: February 19, 2000 (aged 63); Traverse City, Michigan, U.S.
- Listed height: 5 ft 10 in (1.78 m)
- Listed weight: 184 lb (83 kg)

Career information
- High school: St. George (Illinois)
- College: Michigan State
- NFL draft: 1958: 6th round, 72nd overall pick

Career history
- Washington Redskins (1960–1961)

Career NFL statistics
- Interceptions: 3
- Stats at Pro Football Reference

James Francis Wulff (March 22, 1936 – February 19, 2000) was an American professional football defensive back and halfback in the National Football League (NFL) for the Washington Redskins. He played college football at Michigan State University.

== Early life ==
Wulff was born in Chicago, Illinois, to the late James and Frances (Huber) Wulff. He attended St. George High School in Evanston, Illinois, where he played football and basketball. In 1993, Wulff was inducted into the Chicago Catholic League Athletic Coaches Association Hall of Fame.

== College career ==
Wulff attended and played college football at Michigan State University. He played in the 1956 Rose Bowl, in which Michigan State Spartans defeated the UCLA Bruins, 17–14. He graduated in 1958.

== Professional career ==
Wulff was drafted in the sixth round (72nd overall) of the 1958 NFL draft by the Cleveland Browns. He was traded to the Washington Redskins for a tenth-round pick in the 1961 NFL draft. He played for the Redskins in 1960 and 1961, before retiring with a knee injury.

== Personal life ==
After retiring from professional football, Wulff moved from Washington, D.C., to St. Charles, Illinois, and opened Jim Wulff Chevrolet, which operated for nine years. He then moved to Michigan, where he purchased and operated the Elk River Motel in Elk Rapids, Michigan. He was married to Mary Kay Georgen, with two children( Susan Wulff and Cathy Wulff Merz), and died on February 19, 2000, at Munson Medical Center in Traverse City, Michigan.

Wulff served in the National Guard of the United States.
