= 1948 Colgate Red Raiders football team =

American college football season

1948 Colgate Red Raiders football
- Conference: Independent
- Record: 3–6
- Head coach: Paul Bixler (2nd season)
- Captain: Thomas Zetkoff
- Home stadium: Colgate Athletic Field

1948 Eastern major college football independents records
	Conf.			Overall
Team	W	L	T	W		L		T
No. 6 Army		–		8	–	0	–	1
Penn State		–		7	–	1	–	1
Villanova		–		8	–	2	–	1
Boston University		–		6	–	2	–	0
Boston College		–		5	–	2	–	2
Pittsburgh		–		6	–	3	–	0
Holy Cross		–		5	–	5	–	0
Colgate		–		3	–	6	–	0
Fordham		–		3	–	6	–	0
NYU		–		3	–	6	–	0
Temple		–		2	–	6	–	1
Duquesne		–		2	–	7	–	0
Syracuse		–		1	–	8	–	0
Rankings from AP Poll

The 1948 Colgate Red Raiders football team was an American football team that represented Colgate University as an independent during the 1948 college football season. In its second season under head coach Paul Bixler, the team compiled a 3–6 record and was outscored by a total of 196 to 133. Thomas Zetkov was the team captain.

Colgate was ranked at No. 94 in the final Litkenhous Difference by Score System ratings for 1948.

The team played its home games at Colgate Athletic Field in Hamilton, New York.

== Schedule ==
Date	Opponent	Site	Result	Attendance	Source
September 25	Buffalo	Colgate Athletic Field; Hamilton, NY	W 25–0	7,000	
October 2	at Rutgers	Rutgers Stadium; Piscataway, NJ	L 19–34	16,000	
October 9	at Boston University	Fenway Park; Boston, MA	L 13–14	4,598	
October 16	at Dartmouth	Memorial Field; Hanover, NH	L 16–41	12,000	
October 23	at Holy Cross	Fitton Field; Worcester, MA	W 14–13	12,000	
October 30	No. 12 Penn State	Colgate Athletic Field; Hamilton, NY	L 13–32	10,000	
November 6	at Cornell	Schoellkopf Field; Ithaca, NY (rivalry)	L 6–14	18,000	
November 13	at Syracuse	Archbold Stadium; Syracuse, NY (rivalry)	W 20–13	36,232	
November 25	at Brown	Brown Stadium; Providence, RI	L 7–35	20,000	
Rankings from AP Poll released prior to the game
