= 1948 West Virginia Mountaineers football team =

American college football season

1948 West Virginia Mountaineers football

Sun Bowl champion

Sun Bowl, W 21–12 vs. Texas Mines
- Conference: Independent
- Record: 9–3
- Head coach: Dudley DeGroot (1st season)
- Captains: Victor Bonfili; Russell Combs; Frank Reno
- Home stadium: Mountaineer Field

1948 Southern major college football independents records
	Conf.			Overall
Team	W	L	T	W		L		T
West Virginia		–		9	–	3	–	0
Virginia		–		5	–	3	–	1
Chattanooga		–		4	–	5	–	0
Georgetown		–		3	–	4	–	1
Miami (FL)		–		4	–	6	–	0
Navy		–		0	–	8	–	1

The 1948 West Virginia Mountaineers football team was an American football team that represented West Virginia University as an independent during the 1948 college football season. In its first season under head coach Dudley DeGroot, the team compiled a 9–3 record and outscored opponents by a total of 257 to 140. The team played home games at Mountaineer Field in Morgantown, West Virginia. Victor Bonfili, Russell Combs, and Frank Reno were the team captains.

West Virginia was ranked at No. 77 in the final Litkenhous Difference by Score System ratings for 1948.

== Schedule ==
Date	Opponent	Site	Result	Attendance	Source
September 18	Waynesburg	Mountaineer Field; Morgantown, WV	W 29–16		
September 25	Wooster	Mountaineer Field; Morgantown, WV	W 34–6		
October 2	vs. Temple	Hershey Sports Stadium; Hershey, PA	W 27–7	8,000	
October 9	at Pittsburgh	Pitt Stadium; Pittsburgh, PA (rivalry)	L 6–16	18,401	
October 16	at No. 9 Penn State	New Beaver Field; State College, PA (rivalry)	L 7–37	17,814	
October 23	vs. Washington and Lee	Laidley Field; Charleston, WV	W 14–7	11,000	
October 30	South Carolina^{†}	Mountaineer Field; Morgantown, WV	W 35–12	24,000	
November 6	Ohio	Mountaineer Field; Morgantown, WV	W 48–6	5,000	
November 13	at Virginia	Scott Stadium; Charlottesville, VA	L 0–7	17,000	
November 20	Western Reserve	Mountaineer Field; Morgantown, WV	W 20–0	10,000	
November 27	Maryland	Mountaineer Field; Morgantown, WV (rivalry)	W 16–14	18,000	
January 1, 1949	at Texas Mines	Kidd Field; El Paso, TX (Sun Bowl)	W 21–12	13,000	
^{†}Homecoming; Rankings from AP Poll released prior to the game
