= 1948 Villanova Wildcats football team =

American college football season

1948 Villanova Wildcats football

Harbor Bowl champion

Harbor Bowl, W 27–7 vs. Nevada
- Conference: Independent
- Record: 8–2–1
- Head coach: Jordan Olivar (6th season)
- Captain: Louis Ferry
- Home stadium: Franklin Field, Shibe Park, Villanova Stadium

1948 Eastern major college football independents records
	Conf.			Overall
Team	W	L	T	W		L		T
No. 6 Army		–		8	–	0	–	1
Penn State		–		7	–	1	–	1
Villanova		–		8	–	2	–	1
Boston University		–		6	–	2	–	0
Boston College		–		5	–	2	–	2
Pittsburgh		–		6	–	3	–	0
Holy Cross		–		5	–	5	–	0
Colgate		–		3	–	6	–	0
Fordham		–		3	–	6	–	0
NYU		–		3	–	6	–	0
Temple		–		2	–	6	–	1
Duquesne		–		2	–	7	–	0
Syracuse		–		1	–	8	–	0
Rankings from AP Poll

The 1948 Villanova Wildcats football team represented the Villanova University during the 1948 college football season. The head coach was Jordan Olivar, coaching his sixth season with the Wildcats.

Villanova was ranked at No. 24 in the final Litkenhous Difference by Score System ratings for 1948.

The team played their home games at Villanova Stadium in Villanova, Pennsylvania.

== Schedule ==
Date	Opponent	Site	Result	Attendance	Source
September 18	Texas A&M	Franklin Field; Philadelphia, PA	W 34–14	35,000	
September 25	at Army	Michie Stadium; West Point, NY	L 0–28		
October 1	Duquesne	Villanova Stadium; Villanova, PA	W 46–0		
October 8	at Miami (FL)	Burdine Stadium; Miami, FL	W 19–10	42,847	
October 15	at Boston College	Braves Field; Boston, MA	L 13–20	30,178	
October 30	at Detroit	University of Detroit Stadium; Detroit, MI	W 27–6	24,381	
November 6	at Kentucky	Stoll Field/McLean Stadium; Lexington, KY	T 13–13	22,000	
November 13	Georgetown	Shibe Park; Philadelphia, PA	W 36–7	16,500	
November 20	San Francisco	Shibe Park; Philadelphia, PA	W 46–13	10,000	
November 27	at NC State	Riddick Stadium; Raleigh, NC	W 21–7	8,500	
January 1, 1949	vs. Nevada	Balboa Stadium; San Diego, CA (Harbor Bowl)	W 27–7	20,000	
