= Saint George High School (Evanston, Illinois) =

Coordinates: 42°01′29.3″N 87°40′54.4″W

Location
- 350 Sherman Avenue; Evanston, Illinois; United States

Information
- School type: Catholic secondary
- Opened: 1927
- Status: closed
- Closed: 1969
- Grades: 9–12
- Campus: suburban
- Athletics conference: Chicago Catholic League
- Nickname: Dragons

Saint George High School was a Catholic secondary school operated by the Brothers of the Christian Schools in Evanston, Illinois between 1927 and 1969.

== Athletics ==
St. George competed as a member of the Chicago Catholic League from the 1920s until 1961, and the Chicagoland Prep League until its closing in 1969. Starting in 1961, it was a member of the Illinois High School Association (IHSA), which governs most athletic competition in Illinois.

The Catholic League was not part of the IHSA in 1961 and its teams could not participate in state tournaments in any sports. Because they wanted to participate on the state level, St. George and three other Christian Brother schools (DeLaSalle, St. Mel, and St. Patrick) left to form the Chicagoland Prep League (CPL).

Football: The school won the Chicago Prep Bowl on two occasions, 1943 and 1953. In addition to the two Chicago Prep Bowl titles, the school won eight Catholic League division titles, had nine appearances in the Catholic League championship game, plus two conference titles in the Chicagoland Prep League.

Their 1943 record was 9-1-1. Coach Max Burnell. The Dragons tied with Mt. Carmel 0-0 in Catholic League Championship game. They won a coin flip to decide who would face Phillips (Public League champion) in the Chicago Prep Bowl. The Dragons beat Phillips 19-12 in Soldier Field (attendance: 80,000). The Dragons then traveled to New York City to play Mount St. Michael's of the Bronx in a special interdivisional game at the Polo Grounds for the "National Championship". The Dragons won 25-20 with two desperate goal line stands at the end of the game.

Cross Country: St. George's cross country program, under Coach Don Amidei, won seven Catholic League titles (1953, 1954, 1955, 1956, 1958, 1959, 1960) and two Chicagoland Prep League titles (1961, 1962).

Track & Field: The Dragons had one of the best runners in the nation in 1961. Tom Sullivan ran the 1600 in 4:02.4 (a converted time from mile of 4:03.5 to 1600 meters), which was the nation's best until future Olympian Jim Ryun broke the record three years later at 3:59.0.

Basketball: 1943-44 Co-Catholic League Varsity Champs w/Mt. Carmel. 1952-53 Catholic League Varsity Champions.

Baseball: Chicagoland Prep League Champs 1969.

== Closing ==
The school closed after the 1968-1969 school year, despite students still attending and in all four years. The students who had not finished their high school education were sent to other schools, such as Notre Dame High School. These students came to be known colloquially as the 'Bastard Sons of St. George" or the "Bastard Sons of St. George's". The last yearbook issued by the school was titled The Last Georgian.

== Notable alumni ==
- Tony Barone
- Tom Dundee, born Tom Callinan, singer, songwriter
- Frank Ehmann, All-American college basketball player at Northwestern
- Congressman Henry John Hyde (class of 1942)
- John H. Leims (class of 1940) Marine awarded the Medal of Honor
- Marty Wendell, American football player
- Jim Wulff, American football player in the National Football League
