= Hal Herring =

American football player and coach (1924–2014)

No. 26, 20, 50
- Positions: Center, linebacker

Personal information
- Born: February 24, 1924; Lanett, Alabama, U.S.
- Died: February 9, 2014 (aged 89); Cumming, Georgia, U.S.
- Listed height: 6 ft 1 in (1.85 m)
- Listed weight: 211 lb (96 kg)

Career information
- High school: Lanett; West Point (AL)
- College: Auburn (1942, 1946–1948)
- NFL draft: 1949: 9th round, 90th overall pick

Career history

Playing
- Buffalo Bills (1949); Cleveland Browns (1950–1952)

Coaching
- Auburn (1953–1965) Defensive coordinator; Atlanta Falcons (1966–1968) Defensive coordinator; San Diego Chargers (1970) Linebacker

Awards and highlights
- NFL champion (1950); Second-team All-SEC (1948); Auburn MVP (1948); Alabama Sports Hall of Fame (2002)

Career NFL/AAFC statistics
- Games played: 46
- Games started: 25
- Interceptions: 4
- Fumble recoveries: 6
- Stats at Pro Football Reference
- Coaching profile at Pro Football Reference

Harold Moreland Herring (February 24, 1924 – February 9, 2014) was an American professional football player and coach. He played college football at Auburn University and professionally as a center and linebacker for the Buffalo Bills in the All-America Football Conference (AAFC) and the Cleveland Browns in the National Football League (NFL). He later was a defensive coach at Auburn and for the NFL's Atlanta Falcons and San Diego Chargers.

After graduating from high school in Alabama, Herring enrolled at Auburn in 1942 before quitting to serve in the military during World War II. He returned in 1946 and played football at Auburn through the 1948 season, when he was team captain and was named an All-Southeastern Conference (SEC) player by sportswriters. After graduating in 1949, he joined the Bills and played there one season before the AAFC dissolved. The Browns then selected him in a special dispersal draft created to reassign team-less former AAFC players. He was an occasional starter at linebacker in Cleveland for three seasons. The Browns won the NFL championship in his first year and reached the title game but lost in his second and third years.

Herring ended his playing career to accept a position overseeing Auburn's defense in 1953. In his 13 years there, his defenses ranked first in the nation six times and were in the top 10 every season. Auburn won the college football national championship in 1957, when the defense allowed only 28 points. Although Herring was a successful coach, Auburn was fined $2,000 by the SEC and was placed on a three-year probation by the National Collegiate Athletic Association in 1956 after Herring allegedly gave $500 each to two halfback recruits. Herring was hired in 1966 as the Falcons' first defensive coordinator, serving in the position for three seasons. He was the linebackers coach for the Chargers in 1970, but then left the professional ranks to oversee sports at a junior college outside of Atlanta.

== Early life and college ==
Herring grew up in Lanett, Alabama and attended the local Lanett High School. He later went to West Point High School in Cullman, Alabama. After graduating, he enrolled at Auburn University in Auburn, Alabama, where he played on the football team starting in 1942. Herring was named an All-Southeastern Conference (SEC) player that year, when Auburn finished with a 6–4–1 win–loss–tie record under head coach Jack Meagher. He then left Auburn to serve in the U.S. military during World War II and was stationed in France and Germany.

Herring came back to Auburn after the war and played on the football team as a center in the 1946, 1947 and 1948 seasons. Auburn posted losing records in all three of those seasons, but Herring was named an All-SEC player and was Auburn's Most Valuable Player in 1948, his senior year. In addition to center, he played as a quarterback, fullback and linebacker, and was team captain in his senior year. He also participated on Auburn's track and field team. Herring graduated in 1949 with a bachelor's degree in education. He joined Phi Kappa Tau fraternity while in college and was later inducted into its Hall of Fame.

== Professional career ==
Herring was selected 90th overall by the Chicago Cardinals of the National Football League (NFL) in the ninth round of the 1949 draft, but chose instead to sign with the Buffalo Bills of the rival All-America Football Conference (AAFC). He had one interception playing as a linebacker for the Bills during the 1949 season, when the team had a 5–5–2 record. Struggling financially, the AAFC dissolved in late 1949 and three of its teams – the Cleveland Browns, San Francisco 49ers and Baltimore Colts – were absorbed by the NFL. The Bills disbanded and its players were placed in a dispersal draft. The Browns selected Herring in the first round of the draft.

In Cleveland, Herring joined a team that had won all four of the AAFC's championships behind an offense that featured quarterback Otto Graham and fullback Marion Motley. The team finished with a 10–2 record in 1950 and beat the Los Angeles Rams to win the NFL championship in its first year in the league. Herring played as a linebacker, helping replace Lou Saban following his retirement, and had two interceptions. He remained with the Browns for the 1951 and 1952 seasons, both of which ended with a loss in the NFL championship game. He was captain of the defense during his Browns career.

== Coaching career ==
Herring ended his playing career in April 1953 to accept an assistant coaching position at Auburn, replacing former Auburn and New York Giants player Travis Tidwell. Working under head coach Ralph Jordan, he became one of the first coaches to focus exclusively on defense at a time when football teams were transitioning from having players play both offense and defense to two-platoon systems. Auburn posted a 7–3–1 record in Herring's first year, followed by an 8–3 record in 1954, when the team beat Baylor in the Gator Bowl. Auburn finished with an 8–2–1 record in 1955 and again played in the Gator Bowl, but lost to Vanderbilt.

Auburn was fined $2,000 by the SEC in December 1955 after Herring gave $500 each to Harry and Robert Beaube, a pair of twins he was recruiting to play halfback. The twins returned the money the day after Herring gave it to them in November. The following February, Auburn was placed on probation by the SEC and barred indefinitely from participation in bowl games. The fine was the largest the SEC had levied since 1950, and the indefinite probation was unprecedented. The conference called Herring's behavior "inexcusable". In May, the National Collegiate Athletic Association (NCAA), the body that oversees collegiate sports nationally, also put Auburn on probation for three years, the longest such penalty it had ever issued. The school was barred from participating in all NCAA events, including bowl games, for the first two years of the probation.

Auburn posted a 7–3 record in 1956 and went undefeated in 1957, when Herring's defense allowed only 28 points all season. Despite not playing in a bowl game, Auburn won the college football national championship by finishing first in the AP Poll. The team continued to post winning records through the late 1950s and early 1960s. Herring stayed through the 1965 season, a 13-year tenure during which his defenses led the nation in fewest points allowed six times and were always among the top ten.

The NFL's Atlanta Falcons hired Herring as their defensive coach in early 1966, shortly after Norb Hecker became the team's first head coach. He coached for the Falcons for three seasons before being released in 1968 in the wake of Hecker's firing and replacement by Norm Van Brocklin. The Falcons did not win more than three games in any of Herring's seasons coaching in Atlanta. In 1970, Herring was named linebackers coach for the San Diego Chargers, a position he held for one season.

== Later life ==
Herring was named sports director at DeKalb Junior College outside Atlanta, Georgia in July 1971. He stayed there through the 1970s and 1980s, overseeing sports and coaching the tennis and golf teams. In addition to his playing and coaching pursuits, Herring was an academic and writer. He attended graduate school following his playing career, and wrote a doctoral dissertation entitled "Defensive Tactics and Techniques in Professional Football". He also wrote about sports for the Atlanta Journal-Constitution. Herring won a lifetime achievement award for assistant coaches from the All-American Football Foundation, and was inducted into the Alabama Sports Hall of Fame in 2002. He and his wife, Virginia, had five children and were married for 58 years before her death in 2005. He died on February 9, 2014, at age 89.
