= Paul Bixler =

American football player and coach (1907–1985)

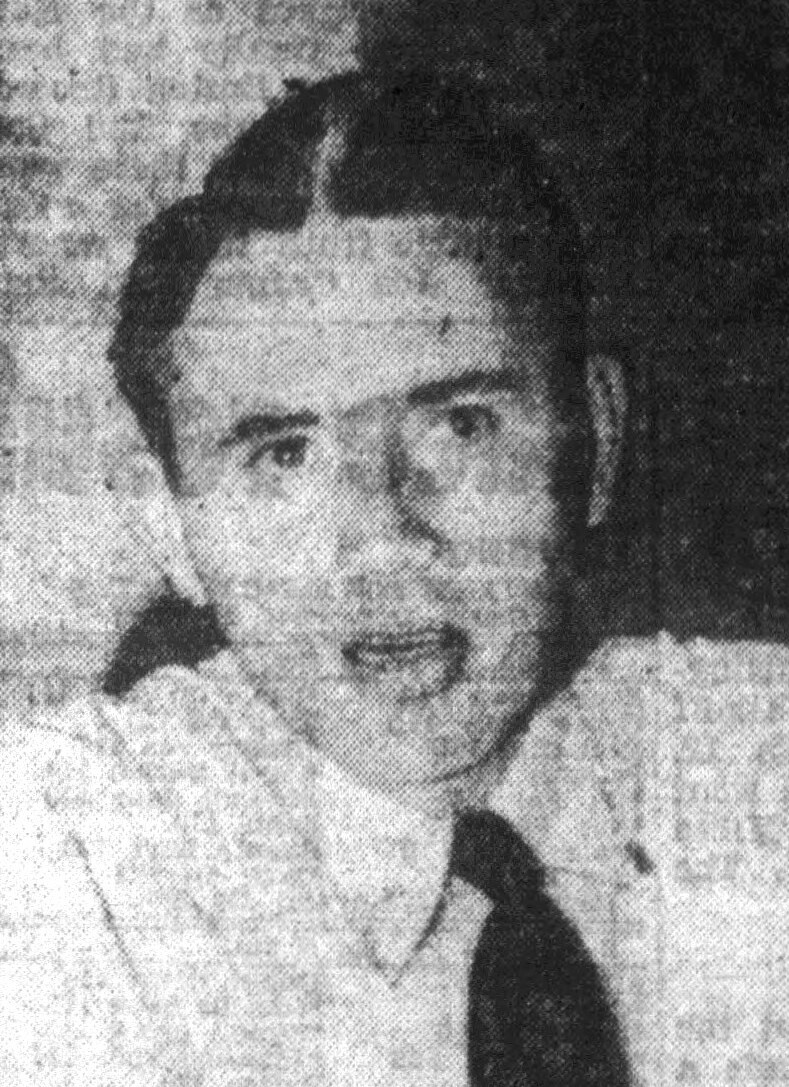
- Bixler, circa 1946

Biographical details
- Born: January 25, 1907
- Died: November 18, 1985 (aged 78); Cleveland, Ohio, U.S.

Playing career

Football
- 1928: Mount Union
- Positions: Guard, fullback

Coaching career (HC unless noted)

Football
- 1939–1941: Colgate (assistant)
- 1945: Ohio State (assistant)
- 1946: Ohio State
- 1947–1951: Colgate

Basketball
- 1936–1939: Akron
- 1939–1941: Colgate

Head coaching record
- Overall: 18–30–4 (football); 52–27 (basketball)

Paul O. Bixler (January 25, 1907 – November 18, 1985) was an American football player, coach, and administrator and basketball coach. He served as the head football coach at Ohio State University for one season in 1946 and at Colgate University from 1947 to 1951, compiling a career record of 18–30–4. Bixler was also the head basketball coach at the University of Akron (1936–1939) and Colgate (1939–1941), tallying a mark of 52–27. He later served as director of player personnel for the Cleveland Browns of the National Football League (NFL).

Bixler was a 1929 graduate of Mount Union College where he was a member of Phi Kappa Tau fraternity and played guard and fullback on the football team. He started his coaching career in Canton, Ohio at Canton Central Junior High and then at Canton McKinley High School. He then became an assistant football coach at the University of Akron where he also served as head basketball coach.

Bixler was the 24th head football coach at Colgate University located in Hamilton, New York and he held that position for five seasons, from 1947 until 1951. His overall coaching record at Colgate was 14–27–2.

Bixler died after suffering a heart attack in 1985.

== Head coaching record ==
=== Football ===
Year	Team	Overall	Conference	Standing	Bowl/playoffs
Ohio State Buckeyes (Big Ten Conference) (1946)
1946	Ohio State	4–3–2	2–3–1	T–6th	
Ohio State:		4–3–2	2–3–1		
Colgate Red Raiders (Independent) (1947–1951)
1947	Colgate	1–5–2			
1948	Colgate	3–6			
1949	Colgate	1–8			
1950	Colgate	5–3			
1951	Colgate	4–5			
Colgate:		14–27–2			
Total:		18–30–4			
