= Joe Sutton (American football) =

American football player (1924–2012)

No. 45
- Positions: Defensive back, fullback

Personal information
- Born: April 26, 1924; Philadelphia, Pennsylvania, U.S.
- Died: November 12, 2012 (aged 88); Bradenton, Florida, U.S.
- Listed height: 6 ft 1 in (1.85 m)
- Listed weight: 180 lb (82 kg)

Career information
- High school: Northeast Catholic (Philadelphia)
- College: Temple

Career history
- Buffalo Bills (1949); Philadelphia Eagles (1950–1952)

Career statistics
- Rushing yards: 64
- Receiving yards: 63
- Receiving touchdowns: 1
- Interceptions: 13
- Fumble recoveries: 4
- Stats at Pro Football Reference

Joe Sutton (April 26, 1924 – November 12, 2012) was an American professional football player who was a defensive back and fullback in the All-America Football Conference (AAFC) and National Football League (NFL). He played college football for the Temple Owls.

== Early life ==
Sutton was born and grew up in Philadelphia, Pennsylvania, and attended Northeast Catholic High School. He helped the Northeast Catholic win the City title in 1942. Sutton joined in the US Army during WWII following graduation.

== College career ==
Sutton was selected to play for the Third Army's all-star football team while his unit was taking part in the Occupation of Germany. After his discharge from the Army, Sutton enrolled at Temple University and played football for one season in 1946. Sutton scored the Owls only touchdown in his first collegiate game, a 7–7 tie with SMU on September 27, 1946.

== Professional career ==
Sutton was signed by the Buffalo Bills of the All-America Football Conference (AAFC) in 1949 after attending a tryout for the team. He originally expected to be cut but made the team after scoring four touchdowns in an exhibition match against the Jersey City Giants of the minor league American Association. He primarily played running back and rushed nine times for 63 yards and caught five passes for 63 yards and one touchdown. His lone touchdown was a 21-yard reception in a 51–7 loss to the San Francisco 49ers. After the league folded he was selected in the fifth round of the 1950 AAFC dispersal draft by the Philadelphia Eagles. He moved to defensive back and set a team record with eight interceptions in his first season with the team and had a three-interception game on September 24, 1950, against the Chicago Cardinals. Sutton played three seasons with the Eagles and intercepted 13 passes.
