= 1948 CCNY Beavers football team =

American college football season

1948 CCNY Beavers football
- Conference: Independent
- Record: 3–4–1
- Head coach: Harold J. Parker (12th season)
- Home stadium: Lewisohn Stadium

1948 Eastern non-major college football independents records
| | Conf. | | | Overall |
| Team | W | L | T | W | | L | | T |
|---|---|---|---|---|---|---|---|---|
| Buffalo | | – | | 6 | – | 1 | – | 1 |
| Franklin & Marshall | | – | | 5 | – | 3 | – | 1 |
| CCNY | | – | | 3 | – | 4 | – | 1 |
| Tufts | | – | | 3 | – | 4 | – | 1 |
| Carnegie Tech | | – | | 1 | – | 7 | – | 0 |
| Hofstra | | – | | 0 | – | 6 | – | 2 |
| Bucknell | | – | | 1 | – | 8 | – | 0 |
| Drexel | | – | | 0 | – | 8 | – | 0 |
Rankings from AP Poll

The 1948 CCNY Beavers football team was an American football team that represented the City College of New York (CCNY) as an independent during the 1948 college football season. In their twelfth season under Harold J. Parker, the Beavers team compiled a 3–4–1 record.

== Schedule ==
| Date | Opponent | Site | Result | Attendance | Source |
|---|---|---|---|---|---|
| September 25 | at Susquehanna | Selinsgrove, PA | L 7–13 | 1,500 | |
| October 1 | at Rider | Trenton, NJ | L 6–49 | | |
| October 9 | Panzer College | Lewisohn Stadium; New York, NY | L 7–12 | 3,500 | |
| October 16 | Lowell Textile | Lewisohn Stadium; New York, NY | W 13–0 | | |
| October 23 | Wagner | Lewisohn Stadium; New York, NY | T 19–19 | | |
| October 30 | Connecticut Teachers | Lewisohn Stadium; New York, NY | W 33–12 | | |
| November 6 | at Brooklyn | Ebbets Field; Brooklyn, NY | L 7–45 | | |
| November 13 | at Hofstra | Hofstra Field; Hempstead, NY | W 47–6 | | |
