= 1948 Fordham Rams football team =

American college football season

1948 Fordham Rams football
- Conference: Independent
- Record: 3–6
- Head coach: Ed Danowski (3rd season)
- Offensive scheme: T formation
- Home stadium: Polo Grounds

1948 Eastern major college football independents records
	Conf.			Overall
Team	W	L	T	W		L		T
No. 6 Army		–		8	–	0	–	1
Penn State		–		7	–	1	–	1
Villanova		–		8	–	2	–	1
Boston University		–		6	–	2	–	0
Boston College		–		5	–	2	–	2
Pittsburgh		–		6	–	3	–	0
Holy Cross		–		5	–	5	–	0
Colgate		–		3	–	6	–	0
Fordham		–		3	–	6	–	0
NYU		–		3	–	6	–	0
Temple		–		2	–	6	–	1
Duquesne		–		2	–	7	–	0
Syracuse		–		1	–	8	–	0
Rankings from AP Poll

The 1948 Fordham Rams football team represented Fordham University as an independent during the 1948 college football season. The Rams went 3-6 and amassed 182 points while their defense allowed 192 points.

Fordham was ranked at No. 144 in the final Litkenhous Difference by Score System ratings for 1948.

== Schedule ==
Date	Opponent	Site	Result	Attendance	Source
September 25	at Lafayette	Fisher Field; Easton, PA	L 14–53	12,000	
October 2	at Merchant Marine	Tomb Field; Kings Point, NY	W 48–0	9,000	
October 9	at Canisius	Civic Stadium; Buffalo, NY	L 21–30	5,000	
October 16	at Saint Francis (PA)	Point Stadium; Johnstown, PA	W 41–0	7,000	
October 22	at Georgetown	Griffith Stadium; Washington, DC	L 0–35	10,036	
November 6	Boston University	Polo Grounds; New York, NY	L 7–33	6,000	
November 13	at Holy Cross	Fitton Field; Worcester, MA	L 6–13	5,000	
November 20	at Rutgers	Rutgers Stadium; Piscataway, NJ	L 19–28	10,000	
November 27	NYU	Polo Grounds; New York, NY	W 26–0	26,000	
