= Frank Ehmann =

American basketball player

Personal information
- Born: December 23, 1933 Chicago, Illinois, U.S.
- Died: August 27, 2023 (aged 89)
- Listed height: 6 ft 3 in (1.91 m)
- Listed weight: 180 lb (82 kg)

Career information
- High school: St. George (Evanston, Illinois)
- College: Northwestern (1951–1955)
- NBA draft: 1955: 4th round, 32nd overall pick
- Drafted by: Syracuse Nationals
- Position: Forward
- Number: 11

Career highlights
- First-team All-American – Look (1955); First-team All-Big Ten (1955); Second-team All-Big Ten (1954)
- Stats at Basketball Reference

Frank A. Ehmann (December 23, 1933 – August 27, 2023) was an American basketball player known for his All-American college career at Northwestern University.

Ehmann joined Northwestern from nearby St. George High School in Evanston, Illinois. He was able to play for the Wildcats as a freshman due to a temporary relaxation of NCAA eligibility rules due to the Korean War. He made the most of his opportunity, earning a starting role that he would hold for four varsity seasons. After two solid years, Ehmann became a primary scorer for the Wildcats as a junior in the 1953–54 season. He averaged 18.2 points per game and at the end of the season was named second-team All-Big Ten Conference and Northwestern's most valuable player for the season.

As a senior, Ehmann spent the year in contention for the Big Ten scoring title as he upped his average to 23.9 points per game. He was recognized as a first-team All-Big Ten performer and earned a spot on Look Magazine's 10-man All-American team. Ehmann left Northwestern as the school's all-time leading scorer for a career (1,291), season (501 his senior year) and single-game (38) – all since broken.

Following the close of his college career, Ehmann toured with a college All-Star team in a series of exhibition games against the Harlem Globetrotters. In the 1955 NBA draft, he was selected by the Syracuse Nationals in the fourth round, but never played in the league. Instead he joined the United States Navy and played amateur basketball on service teams. After his military service, Ehmann entered a career in business in the Chicago area. He once contemplated a return to the business side of basketball in 1989 as a candidate for commissioner of the Continental Basketball Association (CBA), though he ultimately withdrew his name from consideration.

Ehmann died on August 27, 2023.
