= Kass Kovalcheck =

American football player and coach (1907–1969)

Biographical details
- Born: March 31, 1907
- Died: October 26, 1969 (aged 62) near Irwin, Pennsylvania, U.S.

Playing career
- 1927–1930: Duquesne
- Position: Fullback

Coaching career (HC unless noted)
- 1931–1940: Duquesne Prep (PA)
- 1941: McDonell Central Catholic HS (WI)
- 1942: Bridgeville HS (PA)
- 1945: Jacksonville NAS (assistant)
- 1947–1948: Duquesne

Head coaching record
- Overall: 4–15 (college)

Kassian A. Kovalcheck (March 31, 1907 – October 26, 1969) was an American football player and coach. He served as the head football coach at Duquesne University from 1947 to 1948, compiling a record of 4–15. Kovalcheck played college football as a fullback at Duquesne from 1927 to 1930. He died at the age of 62, on October 26, 1969, after suffering from heart attack while driving near Irwin, Pennsylvania.

== Head coaching record ==
=== College ===
Year	Team	Overall	Conference	Standing	Bowl/playoffs
Duquesne Dukes (Independent) (1947–1948)
1947	Duquesne	2–8			
1948	Duquesne	2–7			
Duquesne:		4–15			
Total:		4–15			
