= 1948 Boston College Eagles football team =

American college football season

1948 Boston College Eagles football
- Conference: Independent
- Record: 5–2–2
- Head coach: Denny Myers (5th season)
- Captain: John Furey
- Home stadium: Braves Field

1948 Eastern major college football independents records
	Conf.			Overall
Team	W	L	T	W		L		T
No. 6 Army		–		8	–	0	–	1
Penn State		–		7	–	1	–	1
Villanova		–		8	–	2	–	1
Boston University		–		6	–	2	–	0
Boston College		–		5	–	2	–	2
Pittsburgh		–		6	–	3	–	0
Holy Cross		–		5	–	5	–	0
Colgate		–		3	–	6	–	0
Fordham		–		3	–	6	–	0
NYU		–		3	–	6	–	0
Temple		–		2	–	6	–	1
Duquesne		–		2	–	7	–	0
Syracuse		–		1	–	8	–	0
Rankings from AP Poll

The 1948 Boston College Eagles football team represented Boston College as an independent during the 1948 college football season. The Eagles were led by fifth-year head coach Denny Myers.

Boston College was ranked at No. 46 in the final Litkenhous Difference by Score System ratings for 1948.

The team played its home games at Braves Field in Boston, Massachusetts. Boston College finished with a record of 5–2–2.

== Schedule ==
Date	Opponent	Site	Result	Attendance	Source
September 24	Wake Forest	Braves Field; Boston, MA	W 26–9	26,302	
October 1	at Georgetown	Griffith Stadium; Washington, DC	W 13–6	16,766	
October 9	St. Bonaventure	Braves Field; Boston, MA	T 7–7	16,000	
October 15	Villanova	Braves Field; Boston, MA	W 20–13	30,178	
October 23	at No. 20 Ole Miss	Crump Stadium; Memphis, TN	L 13–32	20,312–23,000	
October 29	No. 13 Clemson	Braves Field; Boston, MA (rivalry)	L 19–26	25,269	
November 13	William & Mary	Braves Field; Boston, MA	T 14–14	15,112	
November 20	Saint Mary's	Braves Field; Boston, MA	W 19–7	13,693	
November 27	Holy Cross	Braves Field; Boston, MA (rivalry)	W 21–20	46,132	
Rankings from AP Poll released prior to the game
