= 1950 AAFC dispersal draft =

Selection of former AAFC players for the NFL

General information
- Date: June 2, 1950

Overview
- 140 total selections in 10 rounds
- League: NFL
- First selection: Chester Mutryn, HB; Baltimore Colts
- Mr. Irrelevant: Gil Johnson, QB/HB; Philadelphia Eagles

On December 9, 1949, the National Football League absorbed three teams from the All-America Football Conference (AAFC) (Cleveland Browns, San Francisco 49ers, Baltimore Colts).

The NFL held a dispersal draft on June 2, 1950 for players from the AAFC teams of the New York Yankees, Buffalo Bills, Chicago Hornets, and Los Angeles Dons. Most of the players from the Yankees had already been divided between the New York Giants and New York Yanks (formerly Bulldogs).

The draft order was determined by the order of finish (worst to best) of the 1949 season. Therefore, the draft order was:

1. Baltimore Colts (AAFC)
2. New York Yanks (New York Bulldogs in 1949)
3. Green Bay Packers
4. Detroit Lions
5. Washington Redskins
6. New York Giants
7. Pittsburgh Steelers
8. Chicago Cardinals (tied with the Steelers)
9. Chicago Bears
10. San Francisco 49ers (AAFC) (tied with the Bears)
11. Los Angeles Rams
12. Cleveland Browns (AAFC)
13. Philadelphia Eagles

Since the Colts and the Packers were the weakest teams, they were given a total of five extra draft picks each, divided at the end of rounds: 3 (2 picks), 5 (1 pick), 7 (1 pick) and 9 (1 pick).

Teams chose 140 players during the ten-round selection meeting.

== Round 1 ==
Pick #	Player	Position	NFL team	AAFC team	College
1	Chester Mutryn	HB	Baltimore Colts	Buffalo Bills	
2	George Taliaferro	HB	New York Yanks	Los Angeles Dons	
3	Billy Grimes	HB	Green Bay Packers	Los Angeles Dons	
4	Robert Hoernschemeyer	HB	Detroit Lions	Chicago Hornets	
5	Jim Spavital	FB	Washington Redskins	Los Angeles Dons	
6	John Rapacz	OL	New York Giants	Chicago Hornets	
7	Buddy Tinsley	T	Pittsburgh Steelers	Los Angeles Dons	
8	Robert Reinhard	T	Chicago Cardinals	Los Angeles Dons	
9	Harper Davis	HB	Chicago Bears	Los Angeles Dons	
10	Knox Ramsey	G	San Francisco 49ers	Los Angeles Dons	
11	Arthur Statuto	C	Los Angeles Rams	Buffalo Bills	
12	Hal Herring	C	Cleveland Browns	Buffalo Bills	
13	Lindy Pearson	HB	Philadelphia Eagles		

== Round 2 ==
Pick #	Player	Position	NFL team	AAFC team	College
14	Robert Livingstone	HB	Baltimore Colts	Buffalo Bills	
15	Nate Johnson	T	New York Yanks	Chicago Hornets	
16	Alton Baldwin	E	Green Bay Packers	Buffalo Bills	
17	Louis Creekmur	T	Detroit Lions		
18	Chuck Drazenovich	FB	Washington Redskins		
19	Ollie Cline	FB	New York Giants	Buffalo Bills	
20	Thomas Ray Richeson	G	Pittsburgh Steelers	Chicago Hornets	
21	Martin Wendell	G	Chicago Cardinals	Chicago Hornets	
22	Fred Negus	C	Chicago Bears	Chicago Hornets	
23	Ed Henke	T	San Francisco 49ers	Los Angeles Dons	
24	Vic Vasicek	G	Los Angeles Rams	Buffalo Bills	
25	Len Ford	E	Cleveland Browns	Los Angeles Dons	
26	Jerry Krall	FB	Philadelphia Eagles	Los Angeles Dons	

== Round 3 ==
Pick #	Player	Position	NFL team	AAFC team	College
27	Albin Collins	HB	Baltimore Colts	Chicago Hornets	
28	Dan Edwards	E	New York Yanks	Chicago Hornets	
29	Homer Paine	T	Green Bay Packers	Chicago Hornets	
30	Bob Jensen	E	Detroit Lions	Chicago Hornets	
31	Roland Dale	T	Washington Redskins		
32	Vince Mazza	E	New York Giants	Buffalo Bills	
33	Tom McWilliams	HB	Pittsburgh Steelers	Los Angeles Dons	
34	Ray Ramsey	HB	Chicago Cardinals	Chicago Hornets	
35	James Clark	T	Chicago Bears		
36	Odell Stautzenberger	G	San Francisco 49ers	Buffalo Bills	
37	Dick Wilkins	E	Los Angeles Rams	Los Angeles Dons	
38	Bill Schroll	HB	Cleveland Browns	Buffalo Bills	
39	George Pastre	T	Philadelphia Eagles	Los Angeles Dons	

== Extra picks ==
Pick #	Player	Position	NFL team	AAFC team	College
40	Arthur Donovan	G	Baltimore Colts	Buffalo Bills	Boston College
41	James Lukens	E	Green Bay Packers	Buffalo Bills	
42	Edward King	G	Baltimore Colts	Buffalo Bills	
43	Abner Wimberly	E	Green Bay Packers	Los Angeles Dons	

== Round 4 ==
Pick #	Player	Position	NFL team	AAFC team	College
44	George Buksar	FB	Baltimore Colts	Chicago Hornets	Purdue
45	Johnny Clowes	T	New York Yanks	Chicago Hornets	William & Mary
46	Wilbur Volz	HB	Green Bay Packers	Buffalo Bills	
47	William Kay	T	Detroit Lions	Buffalo Bills	
48	Lloyd Eisenberg	T	Washington Redskins	Los Angeles Dons	
49	Alfred Schmid	E	New York Giants		
50	Dan Dworsky	C	Pittsburgh Steelers	Los Angeles Dons	
51	Ted Hazelwood	T	Chicago Cardinals	Chicago Hornets	
52	Glenn Dobbs	QB-HB	Chicago Bears	Los Angeles Dons	
53	Earl Howell	HB	San Francisco 49ers	Los Angeles Dons	
54	Wade Walker	T	Los Angeles Rams	Buffalo Bills	
55	Alex Wizbicki	HB	Cleveland Browns	Buffalo Bills	
56	Paul Gibson	E	Philadelphia Eagles	Buffalo Bills	

== Round 5 ==
Pick #	Player	Position	NFL team	AAFC team	College
57	Robert Oristaglio	E	Baltimore Colts	Buffalo Bills	
58	Bob Kennedy	FB	New York Yanks	New York Yankees	
59	John Kerns	T	Green Bay Packers	Buffalo Bills	
60	Richard Rifenberg	E	Detroit Lions	New York Yankees	
61	Hardy Brown	FB	Washington Redskins	Chicago Hornets	
62	Joe Sullivan	QB	New York Giants		
63	Herbert St. John	G	Pittsburgh Steelers	Chicago Hornets	
64	Jim Still	QB	Chicago Cardinals	Buffalo Bills	
65	Al Beasley	G	Chicago Bears	New York Yankees	
66	John Brown	C	San Francisco 49ers	Los Angeles Dons	
67	Ernest Williamson	T	Los Angeles Rams	Los Angeles Dons	
68	Walter Clay	FB	Cleveland Browns	Los Angeles Dons	
69	Joseph Sutton	HB	Philadelphia Eagles	Buffalo Bills	

== Extra picks ==
Pick #	Player	Position	NFL team	AAFC team	College
70	Robert Deuber	HB	Baltimore Colts		
71	Ted Cook	E	Green Bay Packers		

== Round 6 ==
Pick #	Player	Position	NFL team	AAFC team	College
72	Michael Perrotti	T	Baltimore Colts	Los Angeles Dons	
73	Chester Adams	T	New York Yanks	Buffalo Bills	
74	Jason A. Bailey	T	Green Bay Packers	Chicago Hornets	
75	Joyce Pipkin	E	Detroit Lions	Los Angeles Dons	
76	Ed Hirsch	LB	Washington Redskins	Buffalo Bills	
77	Richard Woodard	C	New York Giants	Los Angeles Dons	
78	George Grimes	HB	Pittsburgh Steelers	Buffalo Bills	
79	Jim Turner	T	Chicago Cardinals	Chicago Hornets	
80	John Cunningham	E	Chicago Bears		
81	George Murphy	QB	San Francisco 49ers	Los Angeles Dons	
82	Bill Renna	C	Los Angeles Rams	Los Angeles Dons	
83	George Strohmeyer	C	Cleveland Browns	Chicago Hornets	
84	Hosea Rodgers	FB	Philadelphia Eagles	Los Angeles Dons	

== Round 7 ==
Pick #	Player	Position	NFL team	AAFC team	College
85	Bill Gompers	HB	Baltimore Colts	Buffalo Bills	
86	Paul Crowe	HB	New York Yanks	Los Angeles Dons	
87	Denny Crawford	T	Green Bay Packers	New York Yankees	
88	George Benigni	E	Detroit Lions	Chicago Hornets	
89	Ed Smith	B	Washington Redskins		
90	Henry Foldberg	E	New York Giants	Chicago Hornets	
91	Ben Verick	FB	Pittsburgh Steelers		
92	Alex Sarkisian	C	Chicago Cardinals		Northwestern
93	John Donaldson	HB	Chicago Bears	Los Angeles Dons	
94	John Maskas	T	San Francisco 49ers	Buffalo Bills	
95	Jack Swaner	HB	Los Angeles Rams	Chicago Hornets	
96	Lynn Chewing	FB	Cleveland Browns	New York Yankees	
97	Don Panciera	QB	Philadelphia Eagles	New York Yankees	

== Extra picks ==
Pick #	Player	Position	NFL team	AAFC team	College
98	William Stanton	E	Baltimore Colts	Buffalo Bills	
99	Carl Schuette	C	Green Bay Packers	Buffalo Bills	

== Round 8 ==
Pick #	Player	Position	NFL team	AAFC team	College
100	Veto Kissell	FB	Baltimore Colts	Buffalo Bills	
101	John "Mickey" Colmer	FB	New York Yanks	New York Yankees	
102	Zygmont Czarobski	T	Green Bay Packers	Chicago Hornets	
103	Gerald Morrical	T	Detroit Lions	New York Yankees	
104	Leon McLaughlin	C	Los Angeles Dons		
105	Robert Heck	E	New York Giants	Chicago Hornets	Purdue
106	James Pearcy	G	Pittsburgh Steelers	Chicago Hornets	
107	Phil O'Reilly	T	Chicago Cardinals		Purdue
108	George Maddock	T	Chicago Bears	Chicago Hornets	
109	Paul Cleary	E	San Francisco 49ers	Chicago Hornets	
110	Richard Scott	C	Los Angeles Rams	Brooklyn Dodgers	
111	Paul Patterson	HB	Cleveland Browns	Chicago Hornets	
112	Caleb Washington	C	Philadelphia Eagles	Brooklyn Dodgers	

== Round 9 ==
Pick #	Player	Position	NFL team	AAFC team	College
113	Robert Hatch	QB-HB	Baltimore Colts		
114	Spec Sanders	HB	New York Yanks	New York Yankees	
115	Vic Schleich	T	Green Bay Packers	Chicago Rockets	
116	Warren Huey	E	Detroit Lions	Chicago Hornets	
117	Murray Alexander	E	Washington Redskins	Brooklyn Dodgers	
118	Henry Kalver	T	New York Giants		
119	Robert Forbes	HB	Pittsburgh Steelers		
120	Ralph Sazio	T	Chicago Cardinals	Buffalo Bills	
121	Robert Leonetti	G	Chicago Bears	Buffalo Bills	
122	Ernest Tolman	E	San Francisco 49ers	New York Yankees	
123	Edward Kelley	T	Los Angeles Rams	Los Angeles Dons	
124	William Reinhard	HB	Cleveland Browns	Los Angeles Dons	
125	Carmen Falcone	QB	Philadelphia Eagles		

== Extra picks ==
Pick #	Player	Position	NFL team	AAFC team	College
126	Lou Tomasetti	FB	Baltimore Colts	Buffalo Bills	Bucknell
127	Paul Duke	C	Green Bay Packers	New York Yankees	

== Round 10 ==
Pick #	Player	Position	NFL team	AAFC team	College
128	Lou Agase	T	Baltimore Colts	Chicago Hornets	Illinois
129	Tommy Colella	HB	New York Yanks	Buffalo Bills	
130	R. M. Patterson	T	Green Bay Packers	Chicago Hornets	
131	Ray Coates	HB	Detroit Lions	New York Giants	
132	Dewey Nelson	HB	Washington Redskins		
133	Dwight Eddleman	HB	New York Giants		
134	Robert Meinert	LB	Pittsburgh Steelers	Los Angeles Dons	
135	Vaughn Mancha	C	Chicago Cardinals		
136	George Bernhardt	G	Chicago Bears	Chicago Hornets	Illinois
137	Dick Lorenz	E	San Francisco 49ers	Los Angeles Dons	
138	Dale Armstrong	E	Los Angeles Rams	Brooklyn Dodgers	
139	Lewis Holder	E	Cleveland Browns	Los Angeles Dons	
140	Gil Johnson	QB-HB	Philadelphia Eagles	New York Yankees	
