= 1948 Army Cadets football team =

American college football season

1948 Army Cadets football

Eastern champion
- Conference: Independent

Ranking
- AP: No. 6
- Record: 8–0–1
- Head coach: Earl Blaik (8th season)
- Captain: Bill Yeoman
- Home stadium: Michie Stadium

1948 Eastern major college football independents records
	Conf.			Overall
Team	W	L	T	W		L		T
No. 6 Army		–		8	–	0	–	1
Penn State		–		7	–	1	–	1
Villanova		–		8	–	2	–	1
Boston University		–		6	–	2	–	0
Boston College		–		5	–	2	–	2
Pittsburgh		–		6	–	3	–	0
Holy Cross		–		5	–	5	–	0
Colgate		–		3	–	6	–	0
Fordham		–		3	–	6	–	0
NYU		–		3	–	6	–	0
Temple		–		2	–	6	–	1
Duquesne		–		2	–	7	–	0
Syracuse		–		1	–	8	–	0
Rankings from AP Poll

The 1948 Army Cadets football team represented the United States Military Academy as an independent during the 1948 college football season. Led by head coach Earl Blaik, the Cadets offense scored 294 points while the defense allowed 89 points. At season’s end, Army was ranked sixth in the nation.

== Schedule ==
Date	Opponent	Rank	Site	Result	Attendance	Source
September 25	Villanova		Michie Stadium; West Point, NY	W 28–0		
October 2	Lafayette		Michie Stadium; West Point, NY	W 54–7	20,123	
October 9	at Illinois	No. 5	Memorial Stadium; Champaign, IL	W 26–21	71,119	
October 16	Harvard	No. 5	Michie Stadium; West Point, NY	W 20–7	26,921	
October 23	at No. 12 Cornell	No. 5	Schoellkopf Field; Ithaca, NY	W 27–6	35,000	
October 30	VPI	No. 5	Michie Stadium; West Point, NY	W 49–7	27,000	
November 6	vs. Stanford	No. 4	Yankee Stadium; Bronx, NY	W 43–0		
November 13	at No. 17 Penn	No. 3	Franklin Field; Philadelphia, PA	W 26–20	78,205	
November 27	vs. Navy	No. 3	Philadelphia Municipal Stadium; Philadelphia, PA (Army–Navy Game)	T 21–21		
Rankings from AP Poll released prior to the game

== Rankings ==
Ranking movements Legend: ██ Increase in ranking ██ Decrease in ranking ( ) = First-place votes
	Week								
Poll	1	2	3	4	5	6	7	8	Final
AP	5 (7)	5 (5)	5 (1)	5 (4)	4 (5)	3 (14)	3 (3)	3 (5)	6

== Coaching staff ==
Head coach Earl Blaik implemented a two-platoon system, using specialists strictly for offense and defense. Offensive coach Sid Gillman left Army after the season to become the head coach at the University of Cincinnati.
