= 1948 Syracuse Orangemen football team =

American college football season

1948 Syracuse Orangemen football
- Conference: Independent
- Record: 1–8
- Head coach: Reaves Baysinger (2nd season)
- Captain: Robert Schiffner
- Home stadium: Archbold Stadium

1948 Eastern major college football independents records
	Conf.			Overall
Team	W	L	T	W		L		T
No. 6 Army		–		8	–	0	–	1
Penn State		–		7	–	1	–	1
Villanova		–		8	–	2	–	1
Boston University		–		6	–	2	–	0
Boston College		–		5	–	2	–	2
Pittsburgh		–		6	–	3	–	0
Holy Cross		–		5	–	5	–	0
Colgate		–		3	–	6	–	0
Fordham		–		3	–	6	–	0
NYU		–		3	–	6	–	0
Temple		–		2	–	6	–	1
Duquesne		–		2	–	7	–	0
Syracuse		–		1	–	8	–	0
Rankings from AP Poll

The 1948 Syracuse Orangemen football team represented Syracuse University as an independent during the 1948 college football season. The Orangemen were led by second-year head coach Reaves Baysinger and played their home games at Archbold Stadium in Syracuse, New York. After a dismal 1–8 season, Baysinger was fired.

Syracuse was ranked at No. 129 in the final Litkenhous Difference by Score System ratings for 1948.

== Schedule ==
Date	Time	Opponent	Site	Result	Attendance	Source
September 28		Niagara	Archbold Stadium; Syracuse, NY	W 13–9	25,000	
October 2		at Holy Cross	Fitton Field; Worcester, MA	L 7–33	15,000	
October 8		No. 10 Penn State	Archbold Stadium; Syracuse, NY (rivalry)	L 14–34	14,000	
October 16		No. 13 Cornell	Archbold Stadium; Syracuse, NY	L 7–34	33,000	
October 23		at No. 10 Northwestern	Dyche Stadium; Evanston, IL	L 0–48	35,000	
October 30	2:00 p.m.	at Boston University	Fenway Park; Boston, MA	L 7–12	7,257	
November 6		at Temple	Temple Stadium; Philadelphia, PA	L 0–20	8,500	
November 13		Colgate	Archbold Stadium; Syracuse, NY (rivalry)	L 13–20	36,232	
November 20		at Columbia	Baker Field; New York, NY	L 28–34	20,000	
Rankings from AP Poll released prior to the game
