= 1948 Temple Owls football team =

American college football season

1948 Temple Owls football
- Conference: Independent
- Record: 2–6–1
- Head coach: Ray Morrison (9th season)
- Home stadium: Temple Stadium

1948 Eastern major college football independents records
	Conf.			Overall
Team	W	L	T	W		L		T
No. 6 Army		–		8	–	0	–	1
Penn State		–		7	–	1	–	1
Villanova		–		8	–	2	–	1
Boston University		–		6	–	2	–	0
Boston College		–		5	–	2	–	2
Pittsburgh		–		6	–	3	–	0
Holy Cross		–		5	–	5	–	0
Colgate		–		3	–	6	–	0
Fordham		–		3	–	6	–	0
NYU		–		3	–	6	–	0
Temple		–		2	–	6	–	1
Duquesne		–		2	–	7	–	0
Syracuse		–		1	–	8	–	0
Rankings from AP Poll

The 1948 Temple Owls football team was an American football team that represented Temple University as an independent during the 1948 college football season. In its ninth season under head coach Ray Morrison, the team compiled a 2–6–1 record and was outscored by a total of 182 to 95.

Temple was ranked at No. 136 in the final Litkenhous Difference by Score System ratings for 1948.

The team played its home games at Temple Stadium in Philadelphia.

== Schedule ==
Date	Opponent	Site	Result	Attendance	Source
September 25	Lebanon Valley	Temple Stadium; Philadelphia, PA	T 7–7	10,000	
October 2	vs. West Virginia	Hershey Sports Stadium; Hershey, PA	L 7–27	8,000	
October 9	at Rutgers	Rutgers Stadium; New Brunswick, NJ	L 20–34	13,000	
October 15	Boston University	Temple Stadium; Philadelphia, PA	L 7–13	10,000	
October 23	at Oklahoma A&M	Lewis Field; Stillwater, OK	L 7–41	20,000	
October 29	Bucknell	Temple Stadium; Philadelphia, PA	W 20–0	3,000	
November 6	Syracuse	Temple Stadium; Philadelphia, PA	W 20–0	8,500	
November 13	at No. 5 Penn State	New Beaver Field; State College, PA	L 0–47	16,000	
November 20	Holy Cross	Temple Stadium; Philadelphia, PA	L 7–13	5,000	
Rankings from AP Poll released prior to the game
