= 1948 Holy Cross Crusaders football team =

American college football season

1948 Holy Cross Crusaders football
- Conference: Independent
- Record: 5–5
- Head coach: Bill Osmanski (1st season)
- Home stadium: Fitton Field

1948 Eastern major college football independents records
	Conf.			Overall
Team	W	L	T	W		L		T
No. 6 Army		–		8	–	0	–	1
Penn State		–		7	–	1	–	1
Villanova		–		8	–	2	–	1
Boston University		–		6	–	2	–	0
Boston College		–		5	–	2	–	2
Pittsburgh		–		6	–	3	–	0
Holy Cross		–		5	–	5	–	0
Colgate		–		3	–	6	–	0
Fordham		–		3	–	6	–	0
NYU		–		3	–	6	–	0
Temple		–		2	–	6	–	1
Duquesne		–		2	–	7	–	0
Syracuse		–		1	–	8	–	0
Rankings from AP Poll

The 1948 Holy Cross Crusaders football team was an American football team that represented the College of the Holy Cross as an independent during the 1948 college football season. In its first year under head coach Bill Osmanski, the team compiled a 5–5 record.

Holy Cross was ranked at No. 83 in the final Litkenhous Difference by Score System ratings for 1948.

The team played its home games at Fitton Field in Worcester, Massachusetts.

== Schedule ==
Date	Opponent	Site	Result	Attendance	Source
September 25	Georgetown	Fitton Field; Worcester, MA	W 18–7	21,000	
October 2	Syracuse	Fitton Field; Worcester, MA	W 33–7	15,000	
October 9	at Dartmouth	Memorial Field; Hanover, NH	L 6–19	55,000	
October 16	Brown	Fitton Field; Worcester, MA	L 6–14	20,000	
October 23	Colgate^{†}	Fitton Field; Worcester, MA	L 13–14	12,000	
October 30	at Harvard	Harvard Stadium; Boston, MA	L 13–20	35,000	
November 6	at Duquesne	Forbes Field; Pittsburgh, PA	W 16–13	4,500	
November 13	Fordham	Fitton Field; Worcester, MA (rivalry)	W 13–6	5,000	
November 20	at Temple	Temple Stadium; Philadelphia, PA	W 13–7	5,000	
November 27	vs. Boston College	Braves Field; Boston, MA (rivalry)	L 20–21	46,132	
^{†}Homecoming
