= 1948 Penn State Nittany Lions football team =

American college football season

1948 Penn State Nittany Lions football
- Conference: Independent

Ranking
- AP: No. 18
- Record: 7–1–1
- Head coach: Bob Higgins (19th season)
- Captain: Joe Colone
- Home stadium: New Beaver Field

1948 Eastern major college football independents records
| | Conf. | | | Overall |
| Team | W | L | T | W | | L | | T |
|---|---|---|---|---|---|---|---|---|
| No. 6 Army | | – | | 8 | – | 0 | – | 1 |
| Penn State | | – | | 7 | – | 1 | – | 1 |
| Villanova | | – | | 8 | – | 2 | – | 1 |
| Boston University | | – | | 6 | – | 2 | – | 0 |
| Boston College | | – | | 5 | – | 2 | – | 2 |
| Pittsburgh | | – | | 6 | – | 3 | – | 0 |
| Holy Cross | | – | | 5 | – | 5 | – | 0 |
| Colgate | | – | | 3 | – | 6 | – | 0 |
| Fordham | | – | | 3 | – | 6 | – | 0 |
| NYU | | – | | 3 | – | 6 | – | 0 |
| Temple | | – | | 2 | – | 6 | – | 1 |
| Duquesne | | – | | 2 | – | 7 | – | 0 |
| Syracuse | | – | | 1 | – | 8 | – | 0 |
Rankings from AP Poll

The 1948 Penn State Nittany Lions football team represented the Pennsylvania State University as an independent during the 1948 college football season. The team was coached by Bob Higgins and played its home games in New Beaver Field in State College, Pennsylvania.

== Schedule ==
| Date | Opponent | Rank | Site | Result | Attendance | Source |
|---|---|---|---|---|---|---|
| October 2 | Bucknell | | New Beaver Field; State College, PA | W 35–0 | 14,423 | |
| October 8 | at Syracuse | No. 10 | Archbold Stadium; Syracuse, NY (rivalry) | W 34–14 | 14,000 | |
| October 16 | West Virginia | No. 9 | New Beaver Field; State College, PA (rivalry) | W 37–7 | 17,814 | |
| October 23 | No. 19 Michigan State^{†} | No. 8 | New Beaver Field; State College, PA (rivalry) | T 14–14 | 24,579 | |
| October 30 | at Colgate | No. 12 | Colgate Athletic Field; Hamilton, NY | W 32–13 | 10,000 | |
| November 6 | at No. 7 Penn | No. 14 | Franklin Field; Philadelphia, PA | W 13–0 | 71,180–78,205 | |
| November 13 | Temple | No. 5 | New Beaver Field; State College, PA | W 47–0 | 16,555 | |
| November 20 | at Pittsburgh | No. 6 | Pitt Stadium; Pittsburgh, PA (rivalry) | L 0–7 | 49,444–51,075 | |
| November 27 | at Washington State | No. 18 | Tacoma Stadium; Tacoma, WA | W 7–0 | 18,000 | |
^{†}Homecoming; Rankings from AP Poll released prior to the game

== Rankings ==
Ranking movements Legend: ██ Increase in ranking ██ Decrease in ranking ( ) = First-place votes
| | Week | | | | | | | | |
| Poll | 1 | 2 | 3 | 4 | 5 | 6 | 7 | 8 | Final |
|---|---|---|---|---|---|---|---|---|---|
| AP | 10 (2) | 9 (1) | 8 (1) | 12 (1) | 14 (1) | 5 (1) | 6 (3) | 18 | 18 |
