= 1948 Bucknell Bison football team =

American college football season

1948 Bucknell Bison football
- Conference: Independent
- Record: 1–8
- Head coach: Harry Lawrence (2nd season)
- Captain: John G. Geosits
- Home stadium: Memorial Stadium

1948 Eastern non-major college football independents records
| | Conf. | | | Overall |
| Team | W | L | T | W | | L | | T |
|---|---|---|---|---|---|---|---|---|
| Buffalo | | – | | 6 | – | 1 | – | 1 |
| Franklin & Marshall | | – | | 5 | – | 3 | – | 1 |
| CCNY | | – | | 3 | – | 4 | – | 1 |
| Tufts | | – | | 3 | – | 4 | – | 1 |
| Carnegie Tech | | – | | 1 | – | 7 | – | 0 |
| Hofstra | | – | | 0 | – | 6 | – | 2 |
| Bucknell | | – | | 1 | – | 8 | – | 0 |
| Drexel | | – | | 0 | – | 8 | – | 0 |
Rankings from AP Poll

The 1948 Bucknell Bison football team was an American football team that represented Bucknell University as an independent during the 1948 college football season.

In its second season under head coach Harry Lawrence, the team compiled a 1–8 record. John G. Geosits was the team captain.

Bucknell was ranked at No. 249 in the final Litkenhous Difference by Score System ratings for 1948.

The team played its home games at Memorial Stadium on the university campus in Lewisburg, Pennsylvania.

== Schedule ==
| Date | Opponent | Site | Result | Attendance | Source |
|---|---|---|---|---|---|
| September 25 | Alfred | Memorial Stadium; Lewisburg, PA | W 29–6 | | |
| October 2 | at Penn State | New Beaver Field; State College, PA | L 0–35 | 15,000 | |
| October 9 | Gettysburg | Memorial Stadium; Lewisburg, PA | L 0–13 | 6,000 | |
| October 15 | at Delaware | Wilmington Park; Wilmington, DE | L 0–7 | 8,500 | |
| October 23 | Lafayette^{†} | Memorial Stadium; Lewisburg, PA | L 7–19 | 5,000 | |
| October 29 | at Temple | Temple Stadium; Philadelphia, PA | L 0–20 | 3,000 | |
| November 6 | at Washington & Jefferson | College Park; Washington, PA | L 13–18 | 4,500 | |
| November 13 | at Buffalo | Civic Stadium; Buffalo, NY | L 13–47 | 3,000 | |
| November 20 | Muhlenberg | Memorial Stadium; Lewisburg, PA | L 14–44 | | |
^{†}Homecoming
