= Harry Lawrence (American football) =

American football coach

Biographical details
- Born: November 16, 1908; Baltimore, Maryland, U.S.
- Died: February 20, 1987 (aged 78); Towson, Maryland, U.S.

Playing career
- 1928–1930: Western Maryland
- Position(s): Halfback

Coaching career (HC unless noted)
- 1934–1941: Baltimore City College (MD)
- 1946: Baltimore City College (MD)
- 1947–1957: Bucknell

Head coaching record
- Overall: 45–51–1 (college); 69–10–6 (high school)

Harry Louis Lawrence (November 16, 1908 – February 20, 1987) was an American football coach. He served as the head football coach at Bucknell University from 1947 to 1957, compiling a record of 45–51–1. Lawrence began his coaching career in 1934 at Baltimore City College, a high school in Baltimore, Maryland. He was the head football coach at Baltimore City College from 1934 to 1941 and again in 1946, tallying a mark of 69–10–6. During World War II, he served an officer in the United States Navy with the Atlantic Fleet in the Caribbean, reaching the rank of lieutenant commander. Lawrence attended Baltimore Polytechnic Institute, where he starred in football. He then moved on to Western Maryland College—now known as McDaniel College, playing football as a halfback under head coach Dick Harlow. At Western Maryland, he also competing in basketball, baseball, lacrosse, and rifle. Lawrence resigned from his post at Bucknell in early 1958 to return to Baltimore City College as a guidance counselor. He died at the age of 78, on February 20, 1987, at St. Joseph Hospital in Towson, Maryland.

== Head coaching record ==
=== College ===
Year	Team	Overall	Conference	Standing	Bowl/playoffs
Bucknell Bison (Independent) (1947–1957)
1947	Bucknell	2–7			
1948	Bucknell	1–8			
1949	Bucknell	6–2			
1950	Bucknell	6–3			
1951	Bucknell	9–0			
1952	Bucknell	6–3			
1953	Bucknell	1–8			
1954	Bucknell	6–3			
1955	Bucknell	2–6–1			
1956	Bucknell	3–5			
1957	Bucknell	3–6			
Bucknell:		45–51–1			
Total:		45–51–1			
