= 1948 Drexel Dragons football team =

American college football season

1948 Drexel Dragons football
- Conference: Independent
- Record: 0–8
- Head coach: Ralph Chase (3rd season; first 5 games); Maury McMains (final 3 games)
- Captain: Charlie Pascale
- Home stadium: Drexel Field

1948 Eastern non-major college football independents records
	Conf.			Overall
Team	W	L	T	W		L		T
Buffalo		–		6	–	1	–	1
Franklin & Marshall		–		5	–	3	–	1
CCNY		–		3	–	4	–	1
Tufts		–		3	–	4	–	1
Carnegie Tech		–		1	–	7	–	0
Hofstra		–		0	–	6	–	2
Bucknell		–		1	–	8	–	0
Drexel		–		0	–	8	–	0
Rankings from AP Poll

The 1948 Drexel Dragons football team represented the Drexel Institute of Technology (renamed Drexel University in 1970) as an independent during the 1948 college football season. Ralph Chase was the team's head coach for the first five games of the season, when Maury McMains took over head coaching duties in order to allow Chase to focus on coaching the basketball team.

== Schedule ==
Date	Opponent	Site	Result	Attendance	Source
September 25	Gettysburg	Drexel Field; Philadelphia, PA	L 0–28		
October 2	at Ursinus	Collegeville, PA	L 7–19		
October 9	at Lehigh	Taylor Stadium; Bethlehem, PA	L 0–45	5,000	
October 16	Haverford^{†}	Drexel Field; Philadelphia, PA	L 6–7		
October 23	at Pennsylvania Military	Chester, PA	L 6–33		
October 30	Johns Hopkins	Drexel Field; Philadelphia, PA	L 0–22		
November 6	Dickinson	Drexel Field; Philadelphia, PA	L 12–14		
November 13	at Swarthmore		L 13–33		
^{†}Homecoming

== Roster ==
1948 Drexel Dragons football team roster
Players			Coaches
Offense: Pos. / # / Name / Class; OT / / Charlie Pascale (C) / Jr	Defense: Pos. / # / Name / Class	Special teams: Pos. / # / Name / Class	Head coach: Ralph Chase (Pittsburgh); Maury McMains (Quantico Marine Base); Coordinators/assistant coaches: Herman Epstein (Maryland); Bud Bossick; Otis Douglas (William & Mary); Legend: (C) Team captain; (S) Suspended; (I) Ineligible; Injured; Redshirt
