= 1948 Lafayette Leopards football team =

American college football season

1948 Lafayette Leopards football
- Conference: Middle Three Conference
- Record: 7–2 (1-1 Middle Three)
- Head coach: Ivy Williamson (2nd season)
- Captain: Daniel Kovacs
- Home stadium: Fisher Field

1948 Middle Three Conference football standings
	Conf.					Overall
Team	W		L		T	W		L		T
Rutgers $	2	–	0	–	0	7	–	2	–	0
Lafayette	1	–	1	–	0	7	–	2	–	0
Lehigh	0	–	2	–	0	5	–	4	–	0
$ – Conference champion

The 1948 Lafayette Leopards football team was an American football team that represented Lafayette College during the 1948 college football season. In its second season under head coach Ivy Williamson, the team compiled a 7–2 record and outscored its opponents by a total of 277 to 171. Lafayette declined an invitation to the 1949 Sun Bowl, as African-American running back David Showell would not have been allowed to play in the game. The team played home games at Fisher Field in Easton, Pennsylvania.

Lafayette was ranked at No. 80 in the final Litkenhous Difference by Score System ratings for 1948.

== Schedule ==
Date	Opponent	Site	Result	Attendance	Source
September 25	Fordham*	Fisher Field; Easton, PA	W 53–14	12,000	
October 2	at Army*	Michie Stadium; West Point, NY	L 7–54	20,123	
October 9	Washington & Jefferson*	Fisher Field; Easton, PA	W 56–15	8,000	
October 16	at Muhlenberg*	Muhlenberg Field; Allentown, PA	W 46–13	21,000	
October 23	at Bucknell*	Memorial Stadium; Lewisburg, PA	W 19–7	5,000	
October 30	George Washington*	Fisher Field; Easton, PA	W 33–14	12,000	
November 6	at Rutgers	Rutgers Stadium; New Brunswick, NJ	L 13–34	18,000	
November 13	Ohio Wesleyan*	Fisher Field; Easton, PA	W 27–7	6,000	
November 20	Lehigh	Fisher Field; Easton, PA (The Rivalry)	W 23–13	21,000	
*Non-conference game
