= Gil Johnson =

American football player (1923–1999)

No. 61
- Position: Quarterback

Personal information
- Born: December 4, 1923; Tyler, Texas, U.S.
- Died: July 10, 1999 (aged 75); Dallas, Texas, U.S.
- Listed height: 5 ft 11 in (1.80 m)
- Listed weight: 195 lb (88 kg)

Career information
- High school: John Tyler (Tyler)
- College: SMU (1947-1948)
- NFL draft: 1948: 11th round, 93rd overall pick

Career history
- New York Yankees (1949); Detroit Lions (1950)*; Philadelphia Eagles (1951)*
- * Offseason or practice squad member only

Career AAFC statistics
- TD–INT: 0-5
- Passing yards: 179
- Passer rating: 11
- Stats at Pro Football Reference

Gilbert Johnson (December 4, 1923 – July 10, 1999) was an American professional football player who was a quarterback in the All-America Football Conference (AAFC). He played college football for the SMU Mustangs.

== Early life ==
Johnson was born and grew up in Tyler, Texas, and attended John Tyler High School.

== College career ==
Johnson played four seasons at Southern Methodist University for the Mustangs. He was the team's starting quarterback as a junior and as a senior after sharing passing duties with Doak Walker as a sophomore. In his first year as a starter he passed for 565 yards with eight touchdowns and five interceptions as SMU won the 1947 Southwest Conference championship. As a senior, Johnson led the conference and was sixth in the nation with 1,026 passing yards on 78-for-128 passing with 13 touchdowns and nine interceptions as the Mustangs went 9–1–1 and repeated as SWC champions.

== Professional career ==
Johnson was selected 93rd overall in the 11th round of the 1948 NFL draft by the Philadelphia Eagles. He ultimately missed the 1948 season after he did not agree to a contract with the Eagles and ultimately signed with the New York Yankees of the All-America Football Conference. He played in nine games for the Yankees, completing 12 of 36 pass attempts for 179 yards and five interceptions with no touchdowns. Johnson was selected a second time by the Eagles with the last pick in the 1950 AAFC dispersal draft after the league folded and was subsequently given to the Detroit Lions, who released him before the beginning of the season. Johnson was signed by the Eagles in 1951 but was cut during training camp.
