= 1948 Rutgers Queensmen football team =

American college football season

1948 Rutgers Queensmen football

Middle Three champion
- Conference: Middle Three Conference
- Record: 7–2 (2–0 Middle Three)
- Head coach: Harvey Harman (7th season)
- Home stadium: Rutgers Stadium

1948 Middle Three Conference football standings
	Conf.					Overall
Team	W		L		T	W		L		T
Rutgers $	2	–	0	–	0	7	–	2	–	0
Lafayette	1	–	1	–	0	7	–	2	–	0
Lehigh	0	–	2	–	0	5	–	4	–	0
$ – Conference champion

The 1948 Rutgers Queensmen football team represented Rutgers University in the 1948 college football season. In their seventh season under head coach Harvey Harman, the Queensmen compiled a 7–2 record, won the Middle Three Conference championship, and outscored their opponents 224 to 130.

On October 16, 1948, Rutgers defeated Princeton, 22-6, in front of a crowd of 41,000 at Palmer Stadium in Princeton, New Jersey. This was the first Rutgers victory at Princeton in 79 years of play between the two schools, ending what the Associated Press called "the oldest jinx in intercollegiate football history."

Rutgers was ranked at No. 58 in the final Litkenhous Difference by Score System ratings for 1948.

== Schedule ==
Date	Opponent	Site	Result	Attendance	Source
September 25	at Columbia*	Baker Field; New York, NY	L 6–27	28,000	
October 2	Colgate*	Rutgers Stadium; Piscataway, NJ	W 34–19	16,000	
October 9	Temple*	Rutgers Stadium; Piscataway, NJ	W 34–20	13,000	
October 16	at Princeton*	Palmer Stadium; Princeton, NJ (rivalry)	W 22–7	41,000	
October 23	at Lehigh	Taylor Stadium; Behtlehem, PA	W 20–6	8,000	
October 30	Brown*	Rutgers Stadium; Piscataway, NJ	L 6–20	20,000	
November 6	Lafayette^{†}	Rutgers Stadium; Piscataway, NJ	W 34–13	18,000	
November 13	at NYU*	Yankee Stadium; Bronx, NY	W 40–0	4,000	
November 20	Fordham*	Rutgers Stadium; Piscataway, NJ	W 28–19	10,000	
*Non-conference game; ^{†}Homecoming
