= 1948 Buffalo Bulls football team =

American college football season

1948 Buffalo Bulls football
- Conference: Independent
- Record: 6–1–1
- Head coach: Frank Clair (1st season)
- Captain: Bill Rudick
- Home stadium: Civic Stadium

1948 Eastern non-major college football independents records
	Conf.			Overall
Team	W	L	T	W		L		T
Buffalo		–		6	–	1	–	1
Franklin & Marshall		–		5	–	3	–	1
CCNY		–		3	–	4	–	1
Tufts		–		3	–	4	–	1
Carnegie Tech		–		1	–	7	–	0
Hofstra		–		0	–	6	–	2
Bucknell		–		1	–	8	–	0
Drexel		–		0	–	8	–	0
Rankings from AP Poll

The 1948 Buffalo Bulls football team was an American football team that represented the University of Buffalo as an independent during the 1948 college football season. In its first season under head coach Frank Clair, the team compiled a 6–1–1 record.

Buffalo was ranked at No. 127 in the final Litkenhous Difference by Score System ratings for 1948.

The team played its home games at Civic Stadium in Buffalo, New York.

== Schedule ==
Date	Opponent	Site	Result	Attendance	Source
September 25	at Colgate	Colgate Athletic Field; Hamilton, NY	L 0–25	7,000	
October 2	Hobart	Civic Stadium; Buffalo, NY	W 39–0		
October 9	at RPI	Troy, NY	W 39–21		
October 16	Alfred	Civic Stadium; Buffalo, NY	W 8–0		
October 23	at Washington & Jefferson	Washington, PA	W 41–14		
October 30	at Louisville	Parkway Field; Louisville, KY	W 48–13		
November 6	Niagara	Civic Stadium; Buffalo, NY	T 13–13		
November 13	Bucknell	Civic Stadium; Buffalo, NY	W 47–13	3,000	
