= Robert W. Hatch =

American athletic director and football/baseball coach

Biographical details
- Born: November 16, 1924
- Died: February 13, 2010 (aged 85); Lewiston, Maine, U.S.

Playing career

Football
- 1946–1948: Boston University
- Position: Halfback

Coaching career (HC unless noted)

Football
- 1949–1951: Bates (freshmen)
- 1952–1972: Bates

Baseball
- 1951–1954: Bates

Administrative career (AD unless noted)
- 1959–1974: Bates (assistant AD)
- 1974–1991: Bates

Head coaching record
- Overall: 59–93–8 (football)

Accomplishments and honors

Championships
- Football; 5 MIAA (1956–1957, 1965–1967)

Robert W. Hatch (November 16, 1924 – February 13, 2010) was an American college football and college baseball coach. He served as the head football coach (1952–1972) and head baseball coach (1951–1954) at Bates College in Lewiston, Maine. He also served as the school's athletic director and instructor in physical education.

Hatch as a graduate of Boston University, where he played college football. He was twice drafted by teams in the National Football League (NFL), first by the New York Giants in the 1948 NFL draft and later by the Baltimore Colts in the 1950 AAFC dispersal draft.

== Head coaching record ==
=== Football ===
Year	Team	Overall	Conference	Standing	Bowl/playoffs
Bates Bobcats (Maine Intercollegiate Athletic Association) (1952–1972)
1952	Bates	2–5–1	1–2		
1953	Bates	1–6	0–3	4th	
1954	Bates	2–4–1	2–1		
1955	Bates	2–5	1–2		
1956	Bates	5–2	3–0	1st	
1957	Bates	4–3	2–1	T–1st	
1958	Bates	2–4–1	1–1–1		
1959	Bates	1–5–1	0–2–1		
1960	Bates	2–3–2	0–2–1		
1961	Bates	2–4–2	0–2–1		
1962	Bates	5–3	1–2		
1963	Bates	2–5	0–3	4th	
1964	Bates	3–5	1–2		
1965	Bates	6–2	1–1	T–1st	
1966	Bates	6–2	2–0	1st	
1967	Bates	5–3	2–0	1st	
1968	Bates	5–4	1–1	2nd	
1969	Bates	3–5	0–2	3rd	
1970	Bates	0–8	0–2	3rd	
1971	Bates	0–8	0–2	3rd	
1972	Bates	1–7	0–2	3rd	
Bates:		59–93–8	18–33–4		
Total:		59–93–8			
National championship Conference title Conference division title or championship game berth
