= 1948 Georgetown Hoyas football team =

American college football season

1948 Georgetown Hoyas football
- Conference: Independent
- Record: 3–4–1
- Head coach: Jack Hagerty (14th season)
- Captain: Game captains
- Home stadium: Griffith Stadium

1948 Southern major college football independents records
	Conf.			Overall
Team	W	L	T	W		L		T
West Virginia		–		9	–	3	–	0
Virginia		–		5	–	3	–	1
Chattanooga		–		4	–	5	–	0
Georgetown		–		3	–	4	–	1
Miami (FL)		–		4	–	6	–	0
Navy		–		0	–	8	–	1

The 1948 Georgetown Hoyas football team was an American football team that represented Georgetown University as an independent during the 1948 college football season. In their 14th and final season under head coach Jack Hagerty, the Hoyas compiled a 3–4–1 record and were outscored by a total of 103 to 98.

In the final Litkenhous Difference by Score System ratings for 1948, Georgetown was ranked at No. 99.

The team played its home games at Griffith Stadium in Washington, D.C.

== Schedule ==
Date	Opponent	Site	Result	Attendance	Source
September 25	at Holy Cross	Fitton Field; Worcester, MA	L 7–18	21,000	
October 1	Boston College	Griffith Stadium; Washington, DC	L 6–13	16,766	
October 16	at Tulsa	Skelly Field; Tulsa, OK	W 13–7	7,206	
October 22	Fordham	Griffith Stadium; Washington, DC	W 35–0	10,036	
October 29	Denver	Griffith Stadium; Washington, DC	T 10–10	7,394	
November 5	NYU	Griffith Stadium; Washington, DC	W 13–6	5,892	
November 13	at Villanova	Shibe Park; Philadelphia, PA	L 7–36	16,500	
November 20	at George Washington	Griffith Stadium; Washington, DC	L 7–13	11,828	
