= Marty Wendell =

American football player (1926–2012)

No. 31
- Position: Guard

Personal information
- Born: November 22, 1926; Chicago, Illinois, U.S.
- Died: March 7, 2012 (aged 85); Wheeling, Illinois, U.S.
- Listed height: 5 ft 10 in (1.78 m)
- Listed weight: 215 lb (98 kg)

Career information
- High school: St. George (Evanston, Illinois)
- College: Notre Dame (1944, 1946-1948)
- NFL draft: 1948: 8th round, 63rd overall pick

Career history
- Chicago Hornets (1949)

Awards and highlights
- 2× National champion (1946, 1947); First-team All-American (1948)

Career AAFC statistics
- Games played: 10
- Games started: 8
- Stats at Pro Football Reference

Martin Peter Wendell (November 22, 1926 – March 7, 2012) was an American football guard who played one season with the Chicago Hornets of the All-America Football Conference (AAFC). He was drafted by the Philadelphia Eagles in the eighth round of the 1948 NFL draft. He played college football at the University of Notre Dame.

== Early life ==
Wendell played high school football at St. George High School in Evanston, Illinois as a quarterback.

== College career ==
Wendell joined the Notre Dame Fighting Irish in 1944 as a fullback and linebacker. He did not play for Notre Dame in 1945 due to being in the United States Navy. However, he did play football for the Great Lakes Navy Bluejackets. Wendell returned to Notre Dame in 1946 was moved from fullback on offense to center while still playing linebacker on defense. In 1947, he was moved to guard on offense while still playing linebacker. He started at guard and linebacker his senior year in 1948 and earned All-American honors. After the 1948 season, head coach Frank Leahy called him the best linebacker he had ever coached. Wendell lettered all four years he played for the Fighting Irish and was later billed as the first Notre Dame player to win three letters at three different positions (FB/C/G). He majored in business administration at Notre Dame.

== Professional career ==
Wendell was selected by the Buffalo Bills with the 33rd pick in the 1948 AAFC Draft. He was also selected by the Philadelphia Eagles with the 63rd pick in the eighth round of the 1948 NFL draft.

Wendell played in ten games, starting eight, for the Chicago Hornets in 1949.

He was later selected by the Chicago Cardinals in the second round of the 1950 AAFC dispersal draft.

== Personal life ==
Wendell became a successful businessman in his hometown after his football career. He was later inducted in the Chicago Sports Hall of Fame.
