= 1948 Lehigh Engineers football team =

American college football season

1948 Lehigh Engineers football
- Conference: Middle Three Conference
- Record: 5–4 (0–2 Middle Three)
- Head coach: Bill Leckonby (3rd season)
- Captain: DeForrest Bast
- Home stadium: Taylor Stadium

1948 Middle Three Conference football standings
	Conf.					Overall
Team	W		L		T	W		L		T
Rutgers $	2	–	0	–	0	7	–	2	–	0
Lafayette	1	–	1	–	0	7	–	2	–	0
Lehigh	0	–	2	–	0	5	–	4	–	0
$ – Conference champion

The 1948 Lehigh Engineers football team was an American football team that represented Lehigh University as an independent during the 1948 college football season. Lehigh finished last in the Middle Three Conference In their third year under head coach Bill Leckonby, the Engineers compiled a 5–4 record, 0–2 against conference opponents. DeForrest Bast was the team captain. Lehigh played home games at Taylor Stadium in Bethlehem, Pennsylvania.

Lehigh was ranked at No. 145 in the final Litkenhous Difference by Score System ratings for 1948.

== Schedule ==
Date	Opponent	Site	Result	Attendance	Source
September 25	at Franklin & Marshall*	Sponaugle-Williamson Field; Lancaster, PA	L 12–13	7,500	
October 2	at Case Tech*	Shaw Stadium; East Cleveland, OH	W 26–18	1,200	
October 9	Drexel*	Taylor Stadium; Bethlehem, PA	W 45–0	5,000	
October 16	Gettysburg*	Taylor Stadium; Bethlehem, PA	W 14–13	8,000	
October 23	Rutgers	Taylor Stadium; Bethlehem, PA	L 6–20	8,000	
October 30	NYU*	Taylor Stadium; Bethlehem, PA	L 20–21	9,000	
November 6	Muhlenberg*	Taylor Stadium; Bethlehem, PA	W 35–20	10,000	
November 13	Carnegie Tech*	Taylor Stadium; Bethlehem, PA	W 20–0	7,500	
November 20	at Lafayette	Fisher Field; Easton, PA (The Rivalry)	L 13–23	21,000	
*Non-conference game
