= 1949 NFL draft =

National Football League draft

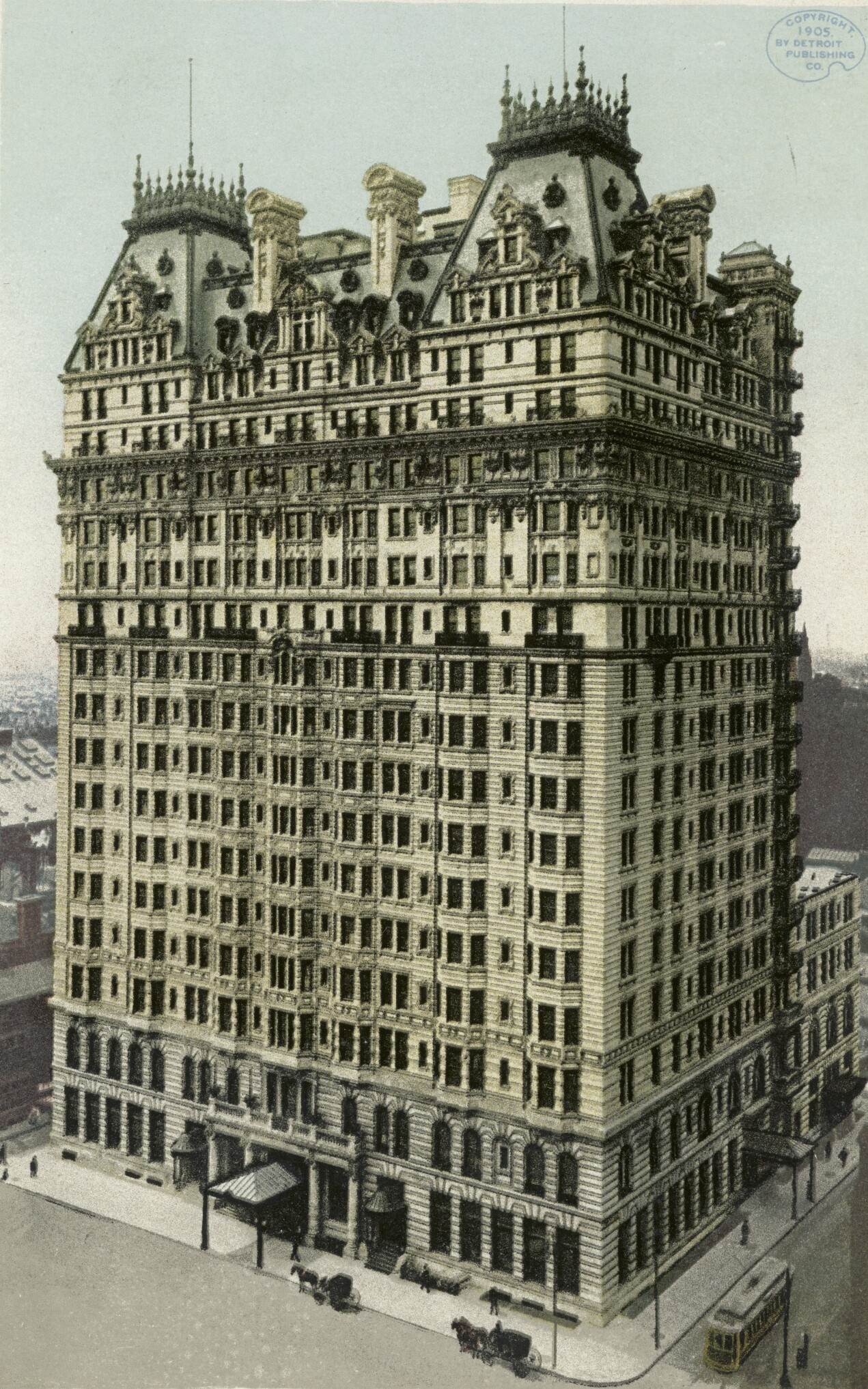
- Bellevue-Stafford Hotel (location of the draft)

General information
- Date: December 21, 1948
- Location: The Bellevue-Stratford Hotel in Philadelphia, Pennsylvania

Overview
- 251 total selections in 25 rounds
- League: NFL
- First selection: Chuck Bednarik, C Philadelphia Eagles
- Most selections (27): Los Angeles Rams; New York Bulldogs
- Fewest selections (23): Detroit Lions; Green Bay Packers
- Hall of Famers: 5: LB/C Chuck Bednarik; RB Doak Walker; QB Norm Van Brocklin; QB Jim Finks; QB George Blanda

The 1949 NFL draft was held on December 21, 1948, at The Bellevue-Stratford Hotel in Philadelphia. The draft was preceded by a secret draft meeting held November 15, 1948, at the Hotel Schenley in Pittsburgh.

This was the third year that the first overall pick was a bonus pick determined by lottery, with the previous two winners (Chicago Bears in 1947 and Washington Redskins in 1948) ineligible from the draw; it was won by the Philadelphia Eagles, who selected center/linebacker Chuck Bednarik.

== Player selections ==
= Pro Bowler	= Hall of Famer

=== Round 1 ===
Pick #	NFL team	Player	Position	College
1	Philadelphia Eagles ^{(Lottery bonus pick)}	Chuck Bednarik	Center	Penn
2	Detroit Lions	John Rauch	Quarterback	Georgia
3	New York Bulldogs	Doak Walker	Halfback	SMU
4	New York Giants	Paul Page	Halfback	SMU
5	Green Bay Packers	Stan Heath	Quarterback	Nevada
6	Pittsburgh Steelers	Bobby Gage	Back	Clemson
7	Los Angeles Rams	Bobby Thomason	Quarterback	VMI
8	Washington Redskins	Rob Goode	Back	Texas A&M
9	Philadelphia Eagles	Frank Tripucka	Quarterback	Notre Dame
10	Chicago Cardinals	Bill Fischer	Guard	Notre Dame
11	Chicago Bears	Dick Harris	Center	Texas

=== Round 2 ===
Pick #	NFL team	Player	Position	College
12	Detroit Lions	John Panelli	Back	Notre Dame
13	New York Bulldogs	Bob DeMoss	Back	Purdue
14	New York Giants	Al DeRogatis	Tackle	Duke
15	Green Bay Packers	Dan Dworsky	Center	Michigan
16	Pittsburgh Steelers	Harper Davis	Back	Mississippi State
17	Los Angeles Rams	George Sims	Back	Baylor
18	Washington Redskins	Laurie Niemi	Tackle	Washington State
19	Philadelphia Eagles	Frank R. Burns	Back	Rutgers
20	Chicago Bears	Billy Grimes	Back	Oklahoma A&M
21	Chicago Cardinals	Dick McKissack	Back	SMU

=== Round 3 ===
Pick #	NFL team	Player	Position	College
22	Detroit Lions	Lou Kusserow	Back	Columbia
23	New York Bulldogs	Phil Colella	Back	St. Bonaventure
24	New York Giants	Bill Olson	Back	Columbia
25	Green Bay Packers	Lou Ferry	Tackle	Villanova
26	Pittsburgh Steelers	Bill Walsh	Center	Notre Dame
27	Los Angeles Rams	Jim Winkler	Tackle	Texas A&M
28	Washington Redskins	Len Szafaryn	Tackle	North Carolina
29	Philadelphia Eagles	Frank Ziegler	Back	Georgia Tech
30	New York Bulldogs	Lynn Chewning	Back	Hampden–Sydney
31	Chicago Bears	Red O'Quinn	End	Wake Forest

=== Round 4 ===
Pick #	NFL team	Player	Position	College
32	Detroit Lions	Joe Sullivan	Back	Dartmouth
33	New York Bulldogs	Huey Keeney	Back	Rice
34	Green Bay Packers	Bob Summerhays	Back	Utah
35	New York Giants	Bill Kay	Tackle	Iowa
36	Pittsburgh Steelers	Joe Geri	Back	Georgia
37	Los Angeles Rams	Norm Van Brocklin	Quarterback	Oregon
38	Washington Redskins	Mike DeNoia	Back	Scranton
39	Chicago Bears	Ben Bendrick	Back	Wisconsin
40	Chicago Cardinals	John Goldsberry	Tackle	Indiana
41	Philadelphia Eagles	Don Panciera	Back	San Francisco

=== Round 5 ===
Pick #	NFL team	Player	Position	College
42	Detroit Lions	George Brodnax	End	Georgia Tech
43	Green Bay Packers	Glenn Lewis	Back	Texas Tech
44	New York Bulldogs	Mike Boyda	Back	Washington & Lee
45	Pittsburgh Steelers	Bill Long	End	Oklahoma A&M
46	New York Giants	J. D. Cheek	Guard	Oklahoma A&M
47	Los Angeles Rams	Dixie Howell	Back	Ole Miss
48	Washington Redskins	Eddie Berrang	End	Villanova
49	Chicago Bears	John Hoffman	Back	Arkansas
50	Chicago Cardinals	Tom Wham	End	Furman
51	Philadelphia Eagles	Terry Brennan	Back	Notre Dame

=== Round 6 ===
Pick #	NFL team	Player	Position	College
52	Detroit Lions	Bob Meinert	Back	Oklahoma A&M
53	New York Bulldogs	Albin Collins	Back	LSU
54	Green Bay Packers	Joe Ethridge	Tackle	SMU
55	New York Giants	Abe Gibron	Guard	Purdue
56	Pittsburgh Steelers	Doug Brightwell	Center	TCU
57	Los Angeles Rams	Charles Reynolds	Back	Texas Tech
58	Philadelphia Eagles	Warren Huey	End	Michigan State
59	Chicago Bears	Jerry Krall	Back	Ohio State
60	Chicago Cardinals	Bernie Hanula	Tackle	Wake Forest
61	New York Bulldogs	Sam Tamburo	End	Penn State

=== Round 7 ===
Pick #	NFL team	Player	Position	College
62	Chicago Cardinals	Myrl Greathouse	Back	Oklahoma
63	Los Angeles Rams	Jerry Williams	Back	Washington State
64	New York Bulldogs	Pete Wismann	Center	St. Louis
65	Pittsburgh Steelers	Bill Talarico	Back	Penn
66	New York Giants	Frank LoVuolo	End	St. Bonaventure
67	Los Angeles Rams	Jon Baker	Guard	California
68	Washington Redskins	Chet Fritz	Guard	Missouri
69	Chicago Bears	Wallace Jones	End	Kentucky
70	Chicago Cardinals	Jim Cain	End	Alabama
71	Philadelphia Eagles	Frank Gillespie	Guard	Clemson

=== Round 8 ===
Pick #	NFL team	Player	Position	College
72	Chicago Bears	Bones Weatherly	Center	Rice
73	New York Bulldogs	Mike Rubish	End	North Carolina
74	Green Bay Packers	Dan Orlich	End	Nevada
75	New York Giants	John Salscheider	Back	St. Thomas (MN)
76	Pittsburgh Steelers	George Brown	Guard	TCU
77	Los Angeles Rams	John Waldrum	Guard	Sul Ross
78	Washington Redskins	Bob Kennedy	Back	North Carolina
79	Chicago Bears	Bill Wightkin	End	Notre Dame
80	Chicago Cardinals	Joe E. Brown	Back	Georgia Tech
81	Philadelphia Eagles	Bob Dean	Back	Cornell

=== Round 9 ===
Pick #	NFL team	Player	Position	College
82	Detroit Lions	Chuck Drazenovich	Back	Penn State
83	Green Bay Packers	Ev Faunce	Back	Minnesota
84	New York Bulldogs	Bernie Craig	Tackle	Denver
85	Pittsburgh Steelers	Tom Brennan	Tackle	Boston College
86	New York Giants	Joe Soboleski	Guard	Michigan
87	Los Angeles Rams	Johnny Smith	End	Arizona
88	Washington Redskins	Ed McNeil	End	Michigan
89	Chicago Bears	Dolph Tokarczyk	Guard	Penn
90	Chicago Cardinals	Hal Herring	Center	Auburn
91	Philadelphia Eagles	Jonathan Jenkins	Tackle	Dartmouth

=== Round 10 ===
Pick #	NFL team	Player	Position	College
92	Detroit Lions	Bill Davis	Guard	Duke
93	New York Bulldogs	John Geary	Tackle	Wesleyan
94	Los Angeles Rams	George Buksar	Back	Purdue
95	New York Giants	Gene Rossides	Back	Columbia
96	Pittsburgh Steelers	Bob Hood	End	Alabama
97	Los Angeles Rams	Max Minnich	Back	Bowling Green
98	Washington Redskins	Vic Vasicek	Guard	Texas
99	Chicago Bears	Lee Nalley	Back	Vanderbilt
100	Chicago Cardinals	Bob Hecker	Back	Baldwin Wallace
101	Philadelphia Eagles	Roy Lester	End	West Virginia

=== Round 11 ===
Pick #	NFL team	Player	Position	College
102	Detroit Lions	Ernie Settembre	Tackle	Miami (FL)
103	Green Bay Packers	Harry Larche	Tackle	Arkansas State
104	New York Bulldogs	Edo Mencotti	Back	Detroit
105	Pittsburgh Steelers	Al Sanders	Center	Mississippi Southern
106	New York Giants	Dick Hensley	End	Kentucky
107	Los Angeles Rams	Jim Cozad	Tackle	Iowa
108	Washington Redskins	Homer Hobbs	Guard	Georgia
109	Chicago Bears	Jerry Tiblier	Back	Ole Miss
110	Chicago Cardinals	Stan Flowers	End	Redlands
111	Philadelphia Eagles	Bobby Wilson	Back	Ole Miss

=== Round 12 ===
Pick #	NFL team	Player	Position	College
112	Detroit Lions	Virgil Boteler	Center	New Mexico
113	New York Bulldogs	Mornane Maenhout	End	St. John's (MN)
114	Green Bay Packers	Rebel Roy Steiner	End	Alabama
115	New York Giants	George Sundheim	Back	Northwestern
116	Pittsburgh Steelers	Jim Finks	Quarterback	Tulsa
117	Los Angeles Rams	Bill Renna	Center	Santa Clara
118	Washington Redskins	Harry Varner	Tackle	Arizona
119	Chicago Bears	George Blanda	Quarterback	Kentucky
120	Chicago Cardinals	Billy Stone	Back	Bradley
121	Philadelphia Eagles	Dale Armstrong	End	Dartmouth

=== Round 13 ===
Pick #	NFL team	Player	Position	College
122	Detroit Lions	Al Russas	End	Tennessee
123	Green Bay Packers	Al Mastrangeli	Center	Illinois
124	New York Bulldogs	Jim Dieckelman	End	Holy Cross
125	Pittsburgh Steelers	R. R. Walston	Guard	North Texas State Teachers
126	New York Giants	Bill Austin	Tackle	Oregon State
127	Los Angeles Rams	Paul Barry	Back	Tulsa
128	Washington Redskins	Ed Henke	Tackle	USC
129	Chicago Bears	George Taliaferro	Back	Indiana
130	Chicago Cardinals	Bob Todd	Tackle	Louisville
131	Philadelphia Eagles	Lyle Button	Tackle	Illinois

=== Round 14 ===
Pick #	NFL team	Player	Position	College
132	Detroit Lions	Dale Panter	Tackle	Utah State
133	New York Bulldogs	Ed Toscani	Back	Dayton
134	Green Bay Packers	Bobby Williams	Center	Texas Tech
135	New York Giants	Norb Adams	Back	Purdue
136	Pittsburgh Steelers	Dave Moon	Back	SMU
137	Los Angeles Rams	Ed Carmichael	Tackle	Oregon State
138	Washington Redskins	Pat Haggerty	End	William & Mary
139	Chicago Bears	Ernie Kelly	Guard	Texas Mines
140	Chicago Cardinals	Tony Klimek	End	Illinois
141	Philadelphia Eagles	Bobby Lund	Back	Tennessee

=== Round 15 ===
Pick #	NFL team	Player	Position	College
142	Detroit Lions	Bob Pifferini	Center	San Jose State
143	Green Bay Packers	Ken Cooper	Guard	Vanderbilt
144	New York Bulldogs	George Ramacorti	Guard	Boston University
145	Pittsburgh Steelers	Ed Sobczak	End	Michigan
146	New York Giants	Ralph Pickelsimer	Center	Otterbein
147	Los Angeles Rams	J. C. Dodd	Back	Sul Ross
148	Washington Redskins	Gene Frassetto	Tackle	California
149	Chicago Bears	Hal Faverty	Guard	Wisconsin
150	Chicago Cardinals	Bob McQuade	Back	Xavier
151	Philadelphia Eagles	Carl Copp	Tackle	Vanderbilt

=== Round 16 ===
Pick #	NFL team	Player	Position	College
152	Detroit Lions	Kimball Merrill	Tackle	BYU
153	New York Bulldogs	Jack Bruce	Back	William & Mary
154	Green Bay Packers	Gene Remenar	Tackle	West Virginia
155	New York Giants	Jerry Morrical	Tackle	Indiana
156	Pittsburgh Steelers	Denvard Snell	Tackle	Auburn
157	Los Angeles Rams	Joe Morgan	Guard	Mississippi Southern
158	Washington Redskins	Dick Flowers	Tackle	Alabama
159	Chicago Bears	Al Wahl	Tackle	Michigan
160	Chicago Cardinals	Tom Murdock	Back	Appalachian State
161	Philadelphia Eagles	Frank Reno	End	West Virginia

=== Round 17 ===
Pick #	NFL team	Player	Position	College
162	Detroit Lions	Zealand Thigpen	Back	Vanderbilt
163	Green Bay Packers	Paul Devine	Back	Heidelberg
164	New York Bulldogs	Warren Beson	Center	Minnesota
165	Pittsburgh Steelers	Veto Kissell	Back	Holy Cross
166	New York Giants	Wally Teninga	Back	Michigan
167	Los Angeles Rams	Dick Sheffield	End	Tulane
168	Washington Redskins	Ross Pritchard	Back	Arkansas
169	Chicago Bears	John Corbisiero	Back	Middlebury
170	Chicago Cardinals	Eddie Rupp	Back	Denison
171	Philadelphia Eagles	Leo Skladany	End	Pittsburgh

=== Round 18 ===
Pick #	NFL team	Player	Position	College
172	Detroit Lions	Bill Wehr	Center	Denison
173	New York Bulldogs	Albie Gould	End	Boston College
174	Green Bay Packers	Floyd Lewis	Guard	SMU
175	New York Giants	Dick Nutt	Back	North Texas State Teachers
176	Pittsburgh Steelers	Clint Shipman	Tackle	East Texas State
177	Los Angeles Rams	Hillary Chollet	Back	Cornell
178	Washington Redskins	Herb Siegert	Guard	Illinois
179	Chicago Bears	Jim Moran	Back	John Carroll
180	Chicago Cardinals	Webb Halbert	Back	Iowa
181	Philadelphia Eagles	Russ Strait	Back	Muhlenberg

=== Round 19 ===
Pick #	NFL team	Player	Position	College
182	Detroit Lions	Wallace Triplett	Back	Penn State
183	Green Bay Packers	Robert Folsom	End	SMU
184	New York Bulldogs	Bob Reich	Tackle	Colgate
185	Pittsburgh Steelers	Jack McBride	End	Rice
186	New York Giants	Ken McCall	Back	Georgia
187	Los Angeles Rams	Joe Leonard	Tackle	Virginia
188	Washington Redskins	Bob Hainlen	Back	Colorado A&M
189	Chicago Bears	Robert Mitten	Guard	North Carolina
190	Chicago Cardinals	Dean Laun	End	Iowa State
191	Philadelphia Eagles	Paul Odom	Guard	Rollins

=== Round 20 ===
Pick #	NFL team	Player	Position	College
192	Detroit Lions	Joe Romano	Tackle	North Carolina
193	New York Bulldogs	Frank Gaul	Tackle	Notre Dame
194	Green Bay Packers	Larry Cooney	Back	Penn State
195	New York Giants	Pat O'Sullivan	Center	Alabama
196	Pittsburgh Steelers	Ben Mann	Guard	Ole Miss
197	Los Angeles Rams	Lloyd Eisenberg	Tackle	Duke
198	Washington Redskins	Oliver Fletcher	End	USC
199	Chicago Bears	Bob Heck	Back	Pacific
200	Chicago Cardinals	Earl Rowan	Tackle	Hardin–Simmons
201	Philadelphia Eagles	Lloyd Brinkman	Back	Missouri

=== Round 21 ===
Pick #	NFL team	Player	Position	College
202	Detroit Lions	Jack Lininger	Center	Ohio State
203	Green Bay Packers	Ken Kranz	Back	UW–Milwaukee
204	New York Bulldogs	Sammy Pierce	Back	Baylor
205	Pittsburgh Steelers	Joe Jackura	Center	Georgia
206	New York Giants	A. D. Cate	Guard	North Texas State Teachers
207	Los Angeles Rams	George Teufel	Back	Lock Haven
208	Washington Redskins	Tommy Hughes	Back	Duke
209	Chicago Bears	Jim Duncan	End	Duke
210	Chicago Cardinals	Leon Joslin	Back	TCU
211	Philadelphia Eagles	Lou Futrell	Back	USC

=== Round 22 ===
Pick #	NFL team	Player	Position	College
212	Detroit Lions	Gil Tobler	Back	Utah
213	New York Bulldogs	Jim Lail	Back	Wake Forest
214	Green Bay Packers	Jay Kordich	Back	USC
215	New York Giants	Tom Fetzer	Back	Wake Forest
216	Pittsburgh Steelers	Lloyd Johnson	Back	West Texas State
217	Los Angeles Rams	Ed Hamilton	End	Arkansas
218	Washington Redskins	Bill Clements	End	UCLA
219	Chicago Bears	Dick Bertuzzi	Back	Kansas
220	Chicago Cardinals	Bill Sprang	Center	Purdue
221	Philadelphia Eagles	Harvey Kingry	Back	Colorado Mines

=== Round 23 ===
Rnd.	Pick	Team	Player	Pos.	College	Notes
23	222	Detroit Lions	R. B. Patterson	G	Mississippi State	
23	223	Green Bay Packers	Bill Kelley	E	Texas Tech	
23	224	New York Bulldogs	Nick Lanza	B	Rice	
23	225	Pittsburgh Steelers	Jim Owens	E	Oklahoma	
23	226	New York Giants	Cletus Fischer	B	Nebraska	
23	227	Los Angeles Rams	Walt Kersulis	E	Illinois	
23	228	Washington Redskins	Frank Pattee	B	Kansas	
23	229	Chicago Bears	Harry Kane	C	Pacific	
23	230	Chicago Cardinals	Bob Cox	E	North Carolina	
23	231	Philadelphia Eagles	Hank Kalver	T	Oklahoma City	

=== Round 24 ===
Pick #	NFL team	Player	Position	College
232	Detroit Lions	Oswald Clark	End	Michigan
233	New York Bulldogs	Joe Ponsalle	Tackle	Trinity (CT)
234	Green Bay Packers	Jimmy Ford	Back	Tulsa
235	New York Giants	Don McAuliffe	Back	Notre Dame
236	Pittsburgh Steelers	Ivan Snowden	Tackle	Texas A&I
237	Los Angeles Rams	Fred Klemenok	Back	San Francisco
238	Washington Redskins	Jim Cullom	Guard	California
239	Chicago Bears	Bernie Smith	Tackle	Texas Mines
240	Chicago Cardinals	Stan Szymakowski	Back	Lehigh
241	Philadelphia Eagles	Fred Leon	Tackle	Nevada

=== Round 25 ===
Pick #	NFL team	Player	Position	College
242	Detroit Lions	Les Cowan	End	McMurry
243	Green Bay Packers	Frank Lambright	Guard	Arkansas
244	New York Bulldogs	Paul Girolamo	Back	Cornell
245	Pittsburgh Steelers	Bobby Gaff	Back	Texas A&M
246	New York Giants	Gene Degyanski	End	Baldwin Wallace
247	Los Angeles Rams	Clay Matthews	Tackle	Georgia Tech
248	Washington Redskins	Nick Sebek	Back	Indiana
249	Chicago Bears	Stan Marczyk	Tackle	North Carolina
250	New York Giants	Ralph Doran	Back	Iowa
251	Philadelphia Eagles	John Schweder	Guard	Penn

= Hall of Famer

== Hall of Famers ==
- Chuck Bednarik, center from the University of Pennsylvania taken 1st round 1st overall by the Philadelphia Eagles.

Inducted: Professional Football Hall of Fame class of 1967.

- Norm Van Brocklin, quarterback from the University of Oregon taken 4th round 37th overall by the Los Angeles Rams.

Inducted: Professional Football Hall of Fame class of 1971.

- George Blanda, quarterback from the University of Kentucky taken 12th round 119th overall by the Chicago Bears.

Inducted: Professional Football Hall of Fame class of 1981.

- Doak Walker, halfback from Southern Methodist University taken 1st round 3rd overall by the Boston Yanks.

Inducted: Professional Football Hall of Fame class of 1986.

- Jim Finks, quarterback from Tulsa taken 12th round 116th overall by the Pittsburgh Steelers.

Inducted: For his achievements as an Executive Professional Football Hall of Fame class of 1995.

- Although not an inductee, Wallace Triplett's photograph hangs in the Hall of Fame in recognition of his being the first African-American to be drafted by and play for a National Football League team.

== Notable undrafted players ==
^{†}	= Pro Bowler

Original NFL team	Player	Pos.	College	Notes
Los Angeles Rams	Vitamin Smith	HB	Abilene Christian	
Los Angeles Rams	Paul "Tank" Younger ^{†}	HB	Grambling State	
