= 1948 Alabama Crimson Tide football team =

American college football season

1948 Alabama Crimson Tide football
- Conference: Southeastern Conference
- Record: 6–4–1 (4–4–1 SEC)
- Head coach: Harold Drew (2nd season)
- Captain: T. Ray Richeson
- Home stadium: Denny Stadium; Legion Field; Ladd Stadium

1948 Southeastern Conference football standings
	Conf.					Overall
Team	W		L		T	W		L		T
No. 8 Georgia $	6	–	0	–	0	9	–	2	–	0
No. 15 Ole Miss	6	–	1	–	0	8	–	1	–	0
No. 13 Tulane	5	–	1	–	0	9	–	1	–	0
No. 12 Vanderbilt	4	–	2	–	1	8	–	2	–	1
Georgia Tech	4	–	3	–	0	7	–	3	–	0
Alabama	4	–	4	–	1	6	–	4	–	1
Mississippi State	3	–	3	–	0	4	–	4	–	1
Tennessee	2	–	3	–	1	4	–	4	–	2
Kentucky	1	–	3	–	1	5	–	3	–	2
Florida	1	–	5	–	0	5	–	5	–	0
LSU	1	–	5	–	0	3	–	7	–	0
Auburn	0	–	7	–	0	1	–	8	–	1
$ – Conference champion; Rankings from AP Poll

The 1948 Alabama Crimson Tide football team (variously "Alabama", "UA" or "Bama") represented the University of Alabama in the 1948 college football season. It was the Crimson Tide's 54th overall and 15th season as a member of the Southeastern Conference (SEC). The team was led by head coach Harold Drew, in his second year, and played their home games at Denny Stadium in Tuscaloosa, Legion Field in Birmingham and Ladd Stadium in Mobile, Alabama. They finished with a record of six wins, four losses and one tie (6–4–1 overall, 4–4–1 in the SEC).

Alabama opened the season with a loss to Tulane, the first for Alabama to open a season since 1903. The next week the Crimson Tide had to score a touchdown with ten seconds left to salvage a tie with Vanderbilt in the first game ever played at Ladd Stadium. Alabama then defeated Duquesne at home, lost at Tennessee and won at Mississippi State before their 35–0 loss to eventual SEC Champion Georgia. The Crimson Tide then rebounded with victories over Mississippi Southern and Georgia Tech before they lost at LSU. Alabama then closed their season with a homecoming victory over Florida and a 55–0 win over Auburn in the renewal of their rivalry. Alabama was ranked at No. 32 in the final Litkenhous Difference by Score System ratings for 1948.

After 41 years of dormancy, 1948 marked the return of the Iron Bowl rivalry with Auburn, the teams have played every year uninterrupted since 1948.

== Schedule ==
Date	Opponent	Site	Result	Attendance
September 25	at Tulane	Tulane Stadium; New Orleans, LA	L 14–21	65,000
October 2	Vanderbilt	Ladd Stadium; Mobile, AL	T 14–14	36,000
October 8	Duquesne*	Denny Stadium; Tuscaloosa, AL	W 48–6	20,000
October 16	at Tennessee	Shields-Watkins Field; Knoxville, TN (Third Saturday in October)	L 6–21	45,000
October 23	at Mississippi State	Scott Field; Starkville, MS (rivalry)	W 10–7	24,000
October 30	No. 18 Georgia	Legion Field; Birmingham, AL	L 0–35	45,000
November 6	Mississippi Southern*	Denny Stadium; Tuscaloosa, AL	W 27–0	20,000
November 13	at No. 11 Georgia Tech	Grant Field; Atlanta, GA (rivalry)	W 14–12	40,000
November 20	at LSU	Tiger Stadium; Baton Rouge, LA (rivalry)	L 6–26	25,000
November 27	Florida^{†}	Denny Stadium; Tuscaloosa, AL (rivalry)	W 34–28	24,000
December 4	vs. Auburn	Legion Field; Birmingham, AL (Iron Bowl)	W 55–0	46,000
*Non-conference game; ^{†}Homecoming; Rankings from AP Poll released prior to the game

== Game summaries ==
=== Tulane ===
Team	1	2	3	4	Total
Alabama	0	0	7	7	14
• Tulane	0	7	14	0	21

- Date: September 25
- Location: Tulane Stadium
  New Orleans, LA
- Game attendance: 65,000

To open the 1948 season, Alabama traveled to New Orleans and were upset by the Tulane Green Wave 21–14. After a scoreless first quarter, Tulane took a 7–0 halftime lead when Bobby Jones capped a 78-yard drive with his seven-yard touchdown run. The Green Wave extended their lead further to 21–0 in the third quarter after touchdowns were scored by Eddie Price on a four-yard run and on a 20-yard Joe Ernst pass to Dick Sheffield. Down by three touchdowns, the Crimson Tide began a comeback only to fall just short. Alabama points were scored on a four-yard Tom Calvin run in the third and on a nine-yard Charley Davis run in the fourth. The loss was the first for the Crimson Tide to open the season since the 1903 team kicked off with a 30–0 loss to Vanderbilt.

=== Vanderbilt ===
Team	1	2	3	4	Total
Vanderbilt	0	7	0	7	14
Alabama	0	0	0	14	14

- Date: October 2
- Location: Ladd Stadium
  Mobile, AL
- Game attendance: 36,000

Alabama played the Vanderbilt Commodores to a 14–14 tie game in what was the inaugural game played at Ladd Stadium in Mobile. After a scoreless first quarter for the second consecutive week, Vanderbilt took a 7–0 halftime lead after Herb Rich scored on a four-yard run. Alabama later tied the game at 7–7 in the fourth quarter after Ed Salem scored on a ten-yard run. The Commodores responded on the next possession with a three-yard Dean Davidson touchdown run for a 14–7 lead. Then Crimson Tide then tied the game at 14–14 as time expired in the fourth when Salem hit Jack Brown in the endzone.

=== Duquesne ===
Team	1	2	3	4	Total
Duquesne	0	0	6	0	6
• Alabama	7	20	7	14	48

- Date: October 8
- Location: Denny Stadium
  Tuscaloosa, AL
- Game attendance: 20,000

In their first Tuscaloosa game of the season, Alabama defeated the Duquesne Dukes 48–6 before 20,000 fans at Denny Stadium. Billy Cadenhead opened the scoring in the first quarter to cap a 94-yard drive with his four-yard touchdown run for a 7–0 Alabama lead. A trio of second quarter touchdowns extended the Crimson Tide lead to 27–0 at halftime. Points were scored on 42-yard Charles Davis reverse, a 72-yard Pete Pettus punt return and on a 17-yard Jim Burkett run.

The Crimson Tide continued their scoring with a 67-yard Cadenhead touchdown in the third run before the Dukes scored their only points of the game. Len Kubiak scored for Duquesne with his one-yard touchdown run to cap a ten-play, 62-yard drive. Alabama then closed the game with a pair of fourth-quarter touchdowns for the 48–6 victory. Points were scored on a 43-yard Travis Hoicks pass to Don Spurrell and later on a six-yard Paul Taylor run.

=== Tennessee ===
Third Saturday in October

Team	1	2	3	4	Total
Alabama	0	0	6	0	6
• Tennessee	7	0	0	14	21

- Date: October 16
- Location: Shields-Watkins Field
  Knoxville, TN
- Game attendance: 45,000

Against Tennessee, the Crimson Tide were defeated by the Volunteers 21–6 before a soldout crowd at Shields-Watkins Field. Tennessee opened the game with a 21-yard, W. C. Cooper touchdown pass to Bob Lund for a 7–0 Volunteer lead. In the third, Alabama scored their only points on a one-yard Charley Davis touchdown run, but a missed extra point allowed Tennessee to retain the lead 7–6. The Volunteers then scored a pair of fourth-quarter touchdowns to win 21–6.

=== Mississippi State ===
Team	1	2	3	4	Total
• Alabama	7	3	0	0	10
Mississippi State	0	0	0	7	7

- Date: October 23
- Location: Scott Field
  Starkville, MS
- Game attendance: 24,000

A week after their loss at Tennessee, Alabama responded the next week with a 10–7 victory against the Mississippi State Maroons on homecoming at Scott Field. The Crimson Tide scored all ten of their points in the first half. Billy Cadenhead scored in the first on a two-yard touchdown run and Ed Salem converted a 14-yard field goal in the second for a 10–0 halftime lead. The Maroons responded late with their only points scored on a 42-yard Tom McWilliams touchdown pass to Kenneth Davis to make the final score 10–7.

=== Georgia ===
Team	1	2	3	4	Total
• #18 Georgia	14	0	14	7	35
Alabama	0	0	0	0	0

- Date: October 30
- Location: Legion Field
  Birmingham, AL
- Game attendance: 45,000

Before what was the largest crowd to date to attend a game in the state of Alabama, the Crimson Tide suffered their worst defeat since the 1910 season with their 35–0 loss against the Georgia Bulldogs. The Bulldogs' first half touchdowns were scored in the first quarter on a 19-yard John Rauch pass to Bobby Walston and a 38-yard pass from Rauch to Joseph Geri. The Bulldogs' second half touchdowns were scored in the third quarter on a three-yard Bernie Reid run and on an 80-yard interception return by Joseph Jackura and in the fourth quarter on an 11-yard Billy Mixon run. The loss was the worst for the Crimson Tide since they were defeated 36–0 by Georgia Tech.

=== Mississippi Southern ===
Team	1	2	3	4	Total
Mississippi Southern	0	0	0	0	0
• Alabama	7	7	7	6	27

- Date: November 6
- Location: Denny Stadium
  Tuscaloosa, AL
- Game attendance: 20,000

A week after their worst defeat in 38 years, Alabama rebounded and defeated the Mississippi Southern Golden Eagles at Denny Stadium 27–0. The Crimson Tide scored touchdowns in four quarters in the victory. First half points were scored on a one-yard Butch Avinger run in the first quarter and on a 32-yard Ed Salem pass to Clem Welsh in the second quarter for a 14–0 halftime lead. Second half points were scored on a 20-yard Jim Franko interception return in the third quarter and on a 5-yard Salem pass to Welsh in the fourth quarter for the 27–0 win.

=== Georgia Tech ===
Team	1	2	3	4	Total
• Alabama	0	7	7	0	14
#11 Georgia Tech	0	0	6	6	12

- Date: November 13
- Location: Grant Field
  Atlanta, GA
- Game attendance: 40,000

Against the Yellow Jackets, the Crimson Tide entered the game as a two touchdown underdog, but left Atlanta with a 14–12 upset over Georgia Tech.

=== LSU ===
Team	1	2	3	4	Total
Alabama	0	0	0	0	0
LSU	0	0	0	0	0

- Date: November 20
- Location: Tiger Stadium
  Baton Rouge, LA
- Game attendance: 25,000

A week after their upset win over Georgia Tech, Alabama was defeated by LSU 26–6 at Tiger Stadium.

=== Florida ===
Team	1	2	3	4	Total
Florida	7	7	7	7	28
• Alabama	0	13	7	14	34

- Date: November 27
- Location: Denny Stadium
  Tuscaloosa, AL
- Game attendance: 24,000

On homecoming at Denny Stadium, Alabama defeated the Florida Gators 34–28.

=== Auburn ===
Iron Bowl

Team	1	2	3	4	Total
Auburn	0	0	0	0	0
• Alabama	7	14	14	20	55

- Date: December 4
- Location: Legion Field
  Birmingham, AL
- Game attendance: 46,000

This meeting against Auburn marked the resumption of their rivalry with the Tigers after a 41-year hiatus. The two schools had met regularly from 1892 through 1895 and then regularly from 1900 through 1907. However, trivial disputes led to the series being discontinued in 1908. Their disputes centered on disagreements on how much per diem to allow players for the trip to Birmingham, how many players each school should bring and where to find officials. By the time all these matters were resolved, it was too late to play in 1908, and the series ended. By 1947 pressure to renew the Iron Bowl had grown to the point that the state legislature threatened to withhold funding from the two schools unless they scheduled a game, and in 1948 Alabama and Auburn finally agreed to meet on a football field.

Prior to the game, Alabama had not played Auburn since their 6–6 tie in 1907. In the renewal of the dormant series, Alabama defeated Auburn 55–0 at Legion Field, in what remains the most lopsided win by either team in the history of the series. The Crimson Tide took a 7–0 lead in the first quarter after Gordon Pettus threw an eight-yard touchdown pass to Butch Avinger. Alabama then extended their lead to 21–0 at halftime with a pair of second-quarter touchdowns. Points were scored on a 20-yard Ed Salem pass to Clem Welsh and then on a six-yard Welsh reverse. The Crimson Tide then scored six second half touchdowns and continued to hold the Tigers scoreless in the 55–0 rout.

Third-quarter touchdowns were scored by Salem on a 17-yard run and on a 53-yard Salem pass to Rebel Steiner. Alabama then closed the game out with three touchdowns in the fourth quarter. Points were scored on a 20-yard Salem pass to Howard Pierson, a punt blocked by Larry Lauer and recovered in the endzone by Tom Salem and on a 20-yard Don Spurrell interception return.

== Personnel ==
=== Varsity letter winners ===
Player	Hometown	Position
Bill Abston	Peterson, Alabama	Halfback
Butch Avinger	Montgomery, Alabama	Quarterback
Jack Brown	Selma, Alabama	Quarterback
Billy Cadenhead	Greenville, Mississippi	Halfback
Jim Cain	Eudora, Arkansas	End
Tom Calvin	Athens, Alabama	Halfback
Bob Cochran	Hueytown, Alabama	Halfback
Charley Davis	Uniontown, Pennsylvania	Halfback
Steve Fortunato	Mingo Junction, Ohio	Guard
Jim Franko	Yorkville, Ohio	Guard
Clem Gryska	Steubenville, Ohio	Halfback
Herb Hannah	Athens, Alabama	Guard
Ed Holdnak	Kenvil, New Jersey	Guard
Bob Hood	Gadsden, Alabama	Tackle
Al Lary	Northport, Alabama	End
Larry Lauer	Wilmette, Illinois	Center
Doug Lockridge	Jasper, Alabama	Center
Floyd Miller	Oneonta, Alabama	Tackle
Mike Mizerany	Birmingham, Alabama	Guard
Lionel W. Noonan	Mobile, Alabama	Halfback
Pat O'Sullivan	New Orleans, Louisiana	Linebacker
Gordon Pettus	Birmingham, Alabama	Halfback
T. Ray Richeson	Russellville, Alabama	Tackle
Ed Salem	Birmingham, Alabama	Halfback
Elliott Speed	Selma, Alabama	Center
Rebel Steiner	Birmingham, Alabama	End
Paul Taylor	Hartford, Alabama	Fullback
Bill Theris	Mobile, Alabama	Tackle
Clem Welsh	Winchester, Illinois	Halfback
Ed White	Anniston, Alabama	End

=== Coaching staff ===
Name	Position	Seasons at Alabama	Alma mater
Harold Drew	Head coach	15	Bates (1916)
Lew Bostick	Assistant coach	5	Alabama (1939)
Tilden Campbell	Assistant coach	9	Alabama (1935)
Joe Kilgrow	Assistant coach	5	Alabama (1937)
Malcolm Laney	Assistant coach	5	Alabama (1932)
Tom Lieb	Assistant coach	3	Notre Dame (1923)
