= 1948 Harvard Crimson football team =

American college football season

1948 Harvard Crimson football
- Conference: Independent
- Record: 4–4
- Head coach: Arthur Valpey (1st season)
- Captain: Kenneth O'Donnell
- Home stadium: Harvard Stadium

1948 Ivy Group football standings
	Conf.					Overall
Team	W		L		T	W		L		T
No. 19 Cornell	4	–	0	–	0	8	–	1	–	0
Penn	3	–	1	–	0	5	–	3	–	0
Dartmouth	4	–	2	–	0	6	–	2	–	0
Brown	1	–	2	–	0	7	–	2	–	0
Princeton	3	–	3	–	0	4	–	4	–	0
Harvard	3	–	3	–	0	4	–	4	–	0
Yale	1	–	4	–	0	4	–	5	–	0
Columbia	1	–	5	–	0	4	–	5	–	0
Rankings from AP Poll

The 1948 Harvard Crimson football team was an American football team that represented Harvard University during the 1948 college football season. In its 1st season under head coach Arthur Valpey, the team compiled a 4–4 record and were outscored by a total of 184 to 130.

Harvard was ranked at No. 61 in the final Litkenhous Difference by Score System ratings for 1948.

Harvard played its home games at Harvard Stadium in the Allston neighborhood of Boston, Massachusetts.

== Schedule ==
Date	Opponent	Rank	Site	Result	Attendance	Source
October 2	Columbia		Harvard Stadium; Boston, MA	W 33–24	20,000	
October 9	at Cornell	No. 18	Schoellkopf Field; Ithaca, NY	L 6–40	25,000	
October 16	at No. 5 Army		Michie Stadium; West Point, NY	L 7–20	26,921	
October 23	Dartmouth		Harvard Stadium; Boston, MA (rivalry)	L 7–14	46,000	
October 30	Holy Cross		Harvard Stadium; Boston, MA	W 20–13	35,000	
November 6	at Princeton		Palmer Stadium; Princeton, NJ (rivalry)	L 7–47	37,000	
November 13	Brown		Harvard Stadium; Boston, MA	W 30–19	25,000	
November 20	Yale		Harvard Stadium; Boston, MA (The Game)	W 20–7	57,495	
Rankings from AP Poll released prior to the game

== Rankings ==
Ranking movements Legend: ██ Increase in ranking ██ Decrease in ranking — = Not ranked
	Week								
Poll	1	2	3	4	5	6	7	8	Final
AP	18	—	—	—	—	—	—	—	—
