= Ross Pritchard =

American academic administrator (1924–2020)

Ross Pritchard (September 3, 1924 – July 8, 2020) served as the fourteenth chancellor of the University of Denver from 1978 to 1984.

== Background ==
Pritchard was born September 3, 1924. He married Emily Gregg in 1948, and the couple had seven children, two of which were adopted Iranian nationals. Pritchard studied at the University of Arkansas and earned both his BA and his MA in political science and history in 1951. He also played college football at Arkansas, and was drafted in the 17th round of the 1949 NFL draft by the Washington Redskins, but chose not to play professional football. The next year, he earned an MA from the Tufts University Fletcher School of Law and Diplomacy, and in 1954 achieved his PhD in international economics. He was appointed to the faculty of Southwestern College at Memphis, Tennessee in 1955, where he combined teaching with football coaching.

In 1976, Ross Pritchard was awarded by the National Collegiate Athletic Association (NCAA) the Silver Anniversary Award recognizing his athletic and professional accomplishments.

== Career ==
Pritchard served as co-chairman of the Regional Export Expansion Committee from 1958 to 1960 under President Eisenhower, and again from 1960 to 1962 under President Kennedy. From 1961 to 1962 he was a member of Kennedy’s National Executive Committee on Foreign Aid. In 1962, Pritchard left Southwestern to take a position as Special Assistant to the Director of the Peace Corps, where he worked on program review and evaluation. He was later appointed Peace Corps Director in Turkey, and served there until 1965. From 1965 to 1968, Pritchard worked as Regional Director of the Peace Corps for East Asia and the Pacific, and in 1968 joined the Development and Resource Corporation where he would eventually become Resident Manager for the firm in Iran. In 1972, he served as president of Hood College, a private women’s liberal arts school in Maryland, which he is credited with saving from bankruptcy. In 1975 he assumed the presidency of Arkansas State University, making this university more competitive with the more popular University of Arkansas. He accepted the chancellorship at University of Denver in 1978.

Pritchard’s leadership skills benefited him as chancellor. He purchased the Colorado Women’s College campus, resurrected DU’s engineering school, and oversaw the building of the Driscoll University Center. He raised the University’s enrollment from 7700 in 1978 to 8600 in 1984, and increased the endowment fund from $18.5 million to $22.5 million over the same time period. Despite these achievements, financial troubles continued to plague the University. DU reported a $2.4 million deficit in 1983, and more than a $1 million deficit in 1984. As a result, Pritchard announced that in 1984 there would be no salary raises for faculty or staff. A majority of DU faculty members voted no confidence in Pritchard, and demanded he resign as chancellor. Reports published by committees of the University Faculty Senate and faculty of the arts and sciences claimed that Pritchard was responsible for “the deteriorating state of the University in general, and of enrollment and development (fund-raising) in particular.”[1] The board of trustees voted unanimously to terminate Pritchard’s employment on 1984, when the chairman of the board Lucien Wulsin declared it was “time for new blood” and named himself interim chancellor.[2] Sargent Shriver, who directed the Peace Corps when Pritchard worked as regional director, explains “American Indians always had two chiefs—one to rule in peace, the other to lead the tribe in war. They knew instinctively that the man who could hold a tribe together in peace could not push his people into battle…Ross Pritchard is the kind of guy you want to have around when there’s a war.”[3] This analogy fits Pritchard well, as he declared he “[didn’t] get...satisfaction from being the most popular guys that walks around that campus.”[4]

== Death ==
Pritchard died July 8, 2020.
