= Jack Salscheider =

American football player (1924–1998)

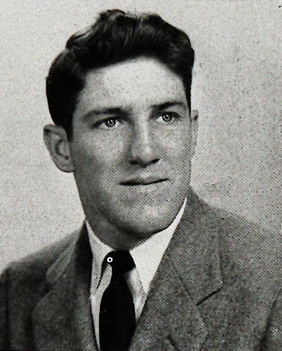
- Salscheider c. 1949

No. 40
- Position: Halfback

Personal information
- Born: December 17, 1924; St. Paul, Minnesota, U.S.
- Died: May 14, 1998 (aged 73); St. Croix Falls, Wisconsin, U.S.
- Listed height: 5 ft 10 in (1.78 m)
- Listed weight: 185 lb (84 kg)

Career information
- High school: Saint Thomas Academy
- College: St. Thomas
- NFL draft: 1949: 8th round, 75th overall pick

Career history
- New York Giants (1949)

Career NFL statistics
- Rushing yards: 105
- Rushing average: 4
- Receptions: 4
- Receiving yards: 9
- Return yards: 474
- Total touchdowns: 1
- Stats at Pro Football Reference

John Joseph Salscheider (December 17, 1924 – May 14, 1998) was an American professional football halfback who played for the New York Giants in the National Football League (NFL). He played college football at St. Thomas University.

== Professional career ==
Salscheider was drafted 75th overall by the New York Giants in 1949. He played 11-of-12 possible games in his rookie season. Not only did he run and return, but he also punted. He ran 26 times for 105 yards, as well as punted 14 times for 495 yards. He also returned 15 kicks for 474 yards.

His only touchdown came in week six against the Chicago Cardinals when he returned a kickoff in the third quarter for a 95-yard touchdown. His return was the longest of the entire season. The return also helped him have the most yards per return for that season as well.
