= Shaky Smithson =

- Smithson in 2011

Profile
- Position: Wide receiver

Personal information
- Born: August 23, 1987 (age 39); Baltimore, Maryland, U.S.
- Listed height: 5 ft 11 in (1.80 m)
- Listed weight: 202 lb (92 kg)

Career information
- College: Utah
- NFL draft: 2011: undrafted

Career history
- Green Bay Packers (2011); Calgary Stampeders (2013)*; New Orleans VooDoo (2015)*; Ottawa Redblacks (2017)*
- * Offseason or practice squad member only
- Stats at Pro Football Reference

Antoine "Shaky" Smithson (born August 23, 1987) is an American former football wide receiver. He played college football at Utah, and was signed as an undrafted free agent by the Green Bay Packers in 2011. In 2010, Smithson led the FBS in both punt return yards (572) and yards-per-punt return (19.1).

== College career ==
Smithson played junior college football at East Los Angeles College. He transferred to the University of Utah, where he played for the Utes from 2009 to 2010. He appeared in 23 career games for Utah, totaling 38 receptions for 483 yards and three touchdowns, 31 rushes for 132 yards and three touchdowns, three completions on nine passing attempts for 42 yards and one touchdown, 43 kick returns for 1,050 yards, and 43 punt returns for 695 yards and two touchdowns. In 2010, Smithson led the FBS in both punt return yards (572) and yards-per-punt return (19.1).

Smithson (#9) during training camp in August 2011.

== Professional career ==
=== Green Bay Packers ===
After going undrafted in the 2011 NFL draft, Smithson was signed by the Green Bay Packers as an undrafted free agent on July 25, 2011 and went on to play in two preseason games in 2011. He was placed on injured reserve for the 2011 season. He returned in 2012 and played in a preseason game on August 9, 2012 against the San Diego Chargers, but was waived with an injury settlement on August 30, 2012.

On October 30, 2012, Smithson had a tryout with the Oakland Raiders, but did not get a contract.

=== Calgary Stampeders ===
Smithson attended the Stampeders' training camp in 2013. On June 14, 2013, Smithson played in a preseason game against the BC Lions in which wore jersey number 72 (an eligible number in the CFL). The game was played at McMahon Stadium and he had one reception for 3 yards, three punt returns for 11 yards and two kickoff returns totaling 37 yards. Two days later, on June 16, 2013, his tenure with the Stampeders was cut short when he was released .

=== New Orleans VooDoo ===
Smithson was assigned to the New Orleans VooDoo on October 29, 2014. On March 12, 2015, Smithson was placed on the physically unable to perform list. Eight days later, on March 20, 2015, he was placed on recallable reassignment.

=== Ottawa Redblacks ===
On December 1, 2016, he signed with the Ottawa Redblacks. He was released on May 1, 2017, as the team trimmed their roster down to 75 players in preparation for the 2017 season.

== Personal life ==
Smithson's brother, Anthony "Fish" Smithson, played safety at the University of Kansas and was signed as an undrafted free agent by the Washington Redskins in 2017.

== See also ==
- List of NCAA major college football yearly punt and kickoff return leaders
