= 1948 Yale Bulldogs football team =

American college football season

1948 Yale Bulldogs football
- Conference: Independent
- Record: 4–5
- Head coach: Herman Hickman (1st season)
- Captain: William E. Conway
- Home stadium: Yale Bowl

1948 Ivy Group football standings
	Conf.					Overall
Team	W		L		T	W		L		T
No. 19 Cornell	4	–	0	–	0	8	–	1	–	0
Penn	3	–	1	–	0	5	–	3	–	0
Dartmouth	4	–	2	–	0	6	–	2	–	0
Brown	1	–	2	–	0	7	–	2	–	0
Princeton	3	–	3	–	0	4	–	4	–	0
Harvard	3	–	3	–	0	4	–	4	–	0
Yale	1	–	4	–	0	4	–	5	–	0
Columbia	1	–	5	–	0	4	–	5	–	0
Rankings from AP Poll

The 1948 Yale Bulldogs football team represented Yale University in the 1948 college football season. The Bulldogs were led by first year head coach Herman Hickman, played their home games at the Yale Bowl and finished the season with a 4–5 record.

Yale was ranked at No. 75 in the final Litkenhous Difference by Score System ratings for 1948.

== Schedule ==
Date	Opponent	Site	Result	Attendance	Source
September 25	Brown	Yale Bowl; New Haven, CT	W 28–13	31,000	
October 2	Connecticut	Yale Bowl; New Haven, CT	W 7–0	25,000	
October 9	Columbia	Yale Bowl; New Haven, CT	L 28–34	55,000	
October 16	at Wisconsin	Camp Randall Stadium; Madison, WI	W 17–7	44,000–45,000	
October 23	Vanderbilt	Yale Bowl; New Haven, CT	L 0–35	30,000	
October 30	Dartmouth	Yale Bowl; New Haven, CT	L 14–41	66,000	
November 6	Merchant Marine	Yale Bowl; New Haven, CT	W 52–0	16,000	
November 13	Princeton	Yale Bowl; New Haven, CT (rivalry)	L 14–20	57,000	
November 20	at Harvard	Harvard Stadium; Boston, MA (The Game)	L 7–20	57,495	
