= Tramaine Thompson =

American football player (born 1990)

No. 86 – Kansas State Wildcats
- Positions: Wide receiver, return specialist

Personal information
- Born: April 10, 1990 (age 36); Tulsa, Oklahoma, U.S.
- Listed height: 5 ft 8 in (1.73 m)
- Listed weight: 167 lb (76 kg)

Career information
- High school: Jenks (OK)
- College: Kansas State (2010–2013)

Awards and highlights
- NCAA punt return leader (2012)

Tramaine Thompson (born April 10, 1990) is an American college football wide receiver and return specialist.

Thompson was born in 1990 in Tulsa, Oklahoma. He attended Jenks High School in Jenks, Oklahoma. In 2008, he caught two touchdown passes, including a 54-yard reception, in the MidFirst Backyard Bowl.

Thompson played college football as a wide receiver and return specialist for the Kansas State Wildcats football team from 2010 to 2013. He sustained an ankle injury late in the 2010 season, but came back from the injury in 2011 with 21 receptions for 338 yards. As a junior in 2012, he returned 16 punts for 316 yards, including an 89-yard return for touchdown against Missouri State. He led all NCAA major college players that year with an average of 19.8 yards per punt return. During his four years at Kansas State, Thompson appeared in 43 games, totaling 109 receptions for 1,673 yards and 10 touchdowns.

== See also ==
- List of NCAA major college yearly punt and kickoff return leaders
