= Paul Copoulos =

Marquette Golden Eagles
- Position: Halfback

Personal information
- Born: March 21, 1922
- Died: December 17, 2008 (aged 86); Brookfield, Wisconsin, U.S.

Career information
- College: Marquette (1943–1945)

Awards and highlights
- NCAA kickoff return leader (1943, 1944)

Paul Copoulos (March 21, 1922 – December 17, 2008) was a Greek-American dentist and university professor. He played at the halfback position for the Marquette University football team from 1943 to 1945. He led the NCAA major colleges in kickoff return yardage in both 1943 and 1944 and set an intercollegiate single-game record that year with consecutive kickoff returns for touchdowns and a total of four returns for 229 yards.

Born in 1922, Copoulos grew up in Milwaukee, Wisconsin. He attended Marquette University as a dentistry student in the V-12 Navy College Training Program. He played college football for the Marquette Hilltops football team. In 1943, he led all NCAA major college players in both kickoff return yards (384 yards on 11 returns) and yards per kickoff return (34.9). On November 6, 1943, in a game against the Iowa Seahawks, he established a college football record with two consecutive kickoff returns for touchdowns (82 and 85 yards) and a total of four returns in the game for a total of 229 yards.

Copoulos was again among the national leader with 337 kickoff return yards in 1945, and he was also selected as the honorary captain of the 1945 Marquette football team. He missed part of the 1945 season due to service in the United States Navy during World War II, but returned to the Marquette football team for the last half of the 1945 season.

Copoulos later became a dentist with a practice in Milwaukee, Wisconsin. He died in 2008 in Brookfield, Wisconsin, at age 86.

== See also ==
- List of NCAA major college yearly punt and kickoff return leaders
