= List of NCAA major college football yearly punt and kickoff return leaders =

The list of NCAA major college football yearly punt and kickoff return leaders identifies the major college leaders for each season from 1939 to the present. It includes yearly leaders in four statistical categories: (1) total punt return yardage, and (2) yards per punt return, (3) total kickoff return yardage, and (4) yards per kickoff return. Prior to 1970, the NCAA determined the punt and kickoff return champions based on total yardage. Starting in 1970, the return champions were determined based on yards per return. Unless otherwise noted, return champions and yardage totals for the years 1939 to 2021 are taken from the NCAA's "Football Bowl Subdivision Records" publication.

== Return leaders ==
Key
^{†} = Winner of that year's Heisman Trophy
Bold = Figure established an NCAA major college record

Season	Player	Punt return yards	Player	Punt return average	Player	Kick return yards	Player	Kick return average
1939	Bosh Pritchard (VMI)	583	Jackie Robinson (UCLA)	20.0	Nile Kinnick^{†} (Iowa)	377	Nile Kinnick	25.1
1940	Junie Hovious (Ole Miss)	498	Jackie Robinson (UCLA)	**21.0**	Jack Emigh (Montana)	395	Bill Geyer (Colgate)	27.0
1941	Bill Geyer (Colgate)	**616**	Walt Slater (Tennessee)	20.4	Earl Ray (Wyoming)	496	Vern Lockard (Colorado)	24.4
1942	Billy Hillenbrand (Indiana)	481	Billy Hillenbrand (Indiana)	20.9	Frank Porto (California)	483	na	na
1943	Marion Flanagan (Texas A&M)	475	Otto Graham (Northwestern)	18.4	Paul Copoulos (Marquette)	384	Paul Copoulos	34.9
1944	Joe Stuart (California)	372	Glenn Davis (Army)	19.7	Paul Copoulos	337	na	na
1945	Jake Leicht (Oregon)	395	Jake Leicht	14.1	Al Dekdebrun	321	na	na
1946	Harry Gilmer (Alabama)	436	Harold Griffin (Florida)	20.1	Forrest Hall (San Francisco)	573	Forrest Hall	**38.2**
1947	Lindy Berry (TCU)	493	Gene Derricotte (Michigan)	**24.8**	Doak Walker (SMU)	387	Skip Minisi (Penn)	28.8
1948	Lee Nalley (Vanderbilt)	**791**	George Sims (Baylor)	**25.0**	Bill Gregus (Wake Forest)	503	Jerry Williams (Washington St.)	29.9
1949	Lee Nalley (Vanderbilt)	498	Gene Evans (Wisconsin)	21.8	Johnny Subda (Nevada)	444	Billy Conn (Georgetown)	31.1
1950	Dave Waters (Wash. & Lee)	445	Lindy Hanson (Boston U.)	22.5	Chuck Hill (New Mexico)	**729**	Johnny Turco (Holy Cross)	27.4
1951	Tom Murphy (Holy Cross)	533	Bill Blackstock (Tennessee)	**25.9**	Chuck Hill (New Mexico)	504	Bob Mischak (Army)	31.3
1952	Horton Nesrsta (Rice)	536	Gil Reich (Kansas)	17.2	Curly Powell (VMI)	517	Larry Spencer (Wake Forest)	**42.2**
1953	Paul Giel (Minnesota)	288	Bobby Lee (New Mexico)	19.4	Max McGee (Tulane)	371	Carl Bolt (Wash. & Lee)	27.1
1954	Dicky Moegle (Rice)	293	Dicky Moegle	19.5	Art Luppino (Tulane)	632	George Marinkov (No. Carolina St.)	35.8
1955	Mike Sommer (Geo. Washington)	330	Ron Lind (Drake)	19.5	Sam Woolwine (VMI)	471	Jim Brown (Syracuse)	32.0
1956	Billy Stacy (Mississippi St.)	290	Ron Lind (Drake)	19.1	Sam Woolwine (VMI)	503	Paul Hornung (Notre Dame)	31.0
1957	Bobby Mulgado (Arizona St.)	267	Bobby Mulgado	19.1	Overton Curtis (Utah St.)	695	Overton Curtis (Utah St.)	30.2
1958	Howard Cook (Colorado)	242	Herb Hallas (Yale)	23.4	Sonny Randle (Virginia)	506	Marshall Starks (Illinois)	26.3
1959	Pervis Atkins (New Mexico St.)	241	Jacque MacKinnon (Colgate)	17.5	Don Perkins (New Mexico)	520	Don Perkins	34.7
1960	Lance Alworth (Arkansas)	307	Pat Fischer (Nebraska)	21.2	Bruce Samples (BYU)	577	Tom Hennessey (Holy Cross)	33.4
1961	Lance Alworth (Arkansas)	336	Tom Larscheid (Utah St.)	23.4	Dick Mooney (Idaho)	494	Paul Allen (BYU)	**40.1**
1962	Darrell Roberts (Utah St.)	333	Darrell Roberts	20.8	Donny Frederic (Wake Forest)	660	Larry Coyer (Marshall)	30.2
1963	Ken Hatfield (Arkansas)	350	Rickie Harris (Arizona)	17.4	Gary Wood (Cornell)	618	Gary Wood	32.5
1964	Ken Hatfield (Arkansas)	518	Ken Hatfield	16.7	Dan Bland (Mississippi St.)	558	Bob Baker (Cornell)	35.1
1965	Nick Rassas (Notre Dame)	459	Floyd Little (Syracuse)	23.5	Eric Crabtree (Pittsburgh)	636	Tom Barrington (Ohio St.)	34.3
1966	Vic Washington (Wyoming)	443	Don Bean (Houston)	20.2	Marcus Rhoden (Mississippi St.)	572	Frank Moore (Louisville)	27.9
1967	Mike Battle (USC)	570	George Hoey (Michigan)	24.3	Joe Casas (New Mexico)	602	Altie Taylor (Utah St.)	31.9
1968	Roger Wehrli (Missouri)	478	Rob Bordley (Princeton)	20.5	Mike Adamle (Northwestern)	**732**	Kerry Reardon (Iowa)	32.1
1969	Chris Farasopoulos (BYU)	527	George Hannen (Davidson)	22.4	Stan Brown (Purdue)	698	Chris Farasopoulos; BYU	32.2
1970			Steve Holden (Arizona St.)	19.2			Stan Brown (Purdue)	33.6
1971			Golden Richards (BYU)	18.9			Paul Loughran (Temple)	33.5
1972			Randy Rhino; Georgia Tech	17.6			Larry Williams; Texas Tech	30.8
1973			Gary Hayman (Penn St.)	19.2			Steve Odom (Utah)	29.4
1974			John Provost; Holy Cross	18.3			Anthony Davis (USC)	**42.5**
1975			Donnie Ross (New Mexico St.)	16.1			John Schultz (Maryland)	31.0
1976			Henry Jenkins (Rutgers)	15.0			Ira Matthews (Wisconsin)	29.6
1977			Robert Woods (Grambling)	25.4			Tony Ball (Chattanooga)	36.4
1978			Ira Matthews; Wisconsin	16.9			Drew Hill (Georgia Tech)	30.0
1979			Jeffrey Shockley (Tennessee St.)	16.9			Stevie Nelson (Ball St.)	31.4
1980			Scott Woerner; Georgia	15.7			Mike Fox (San Diego St.)	32.8
1981			Glen Young (Mississippi St.)	16.2			Frank Minnifield; Louisville	30.4
1982			Lionel James (Auburn)	15.8			Carl Monroe (Utah)	30.1
1983			Jim Sandusky (San Diego St.)	19.0			Gizmo Williams (East Carolina)	31.1
1984			Ricky Nattiel (Florida)	15.7			Keith Henderson (Texas Tech)	28.9
1985			Erroll Tucker (Utah)	24.3			Erroll Tucker	29.1
1986			Rod Smith (Nebraska)	18.9			Terrance Roulhac (Clemson)	33
1987			Alan Grant (Stanford)	16.5			Barry Sanders (Oklahoma St.)	31.6
1988			Deion Sanders (Florida St.)	15.2			Raghib Ismail (Notre Dame)	36.1
1989			Larry Hargrove (Ohio)	18.2			Tony Smith (Southern Miss.)	32.5
1990			Dave McCloughan (Colorado)	16.4			Dale Carter (Tennessee)	29.8
1991			Bo Campbell (Virginia Tech)	18.2			Fred Montgomery (New Mexico St.)	29.4
1992			Lee Gissendaner (Northwestern)	21.8			Fred Montgomery (New Mexico St.)	32.6
1993			Aaron Glenn (Texas A&M)	19.9			Leeland McElroy (Texas A&M)	39.3
1994			Steve Clay (Eastern Mich.)	19.9			Eric Moulds (Mississippi St.)	32.8
1995			James Dye (BYU)	21.9			Robert Tate (Cincinnati)	34.3
1996			Allen Rossum (Notre Dame)	22.9			Tremain Mack (Miami-FL)	39.5
1997			Tim Dwight (Iowa)	19.3			Eric Booth (Southern Miss.)	34.8
1998			David Allen (Kansas St.)	22.1			Broderick McGrew (North Texas)	32.6
1999			Dennis Northcutt (Arizona)	19.0			James Williams (Marshall)	32.9
2000			Aaron Lockett (Kansas St.)	22.8			LaTarence Dunbar (TCU)	33.7
2001			Roman Hollowell (Colorado)	18.0			Chris Massey (Oklahoma St.)	34.8
2002	Steve Suter (Maryland)	**771**	Dan Sheldon (Northern Ill.)	22.7			Charles Pauley (San Jose St.)	31.6
2003			Skyler Green (LSU)	18.5			Michael Waddell (North Carolina); J. R. Reed (South Fla.)	31.7
2004			Ted Ginn Jr. (Ohio St.)	25.6			Justin Miller (Clemson)	33.1
2005			Maurice Jones-Drew (UCLA)	**28.5**			Jonathan Stewart (Oregon)	33.7
2006			DeSean Jackson (California)	18.2			Marcus Thigpen (Indiana)	30.1
2007			Kevin Robinson (Utah St.)	18.9			A. J. Jefferson (Fresno St.)	35.8
2008			Antonio Brown (Central Mich.)	20.5			Travis Shelton (Temple)	31.3
2009			Greg Reid (Florida St.)	18.4			Ray Fisher (Indiana)	37.4
2010	Shaky Smithson (Utah Sr.)	572	Shaky Smithson (Utah Sr.)	19.1			Nick Williams (Connecticut)	35.3
2011			Dustin Harris (Texas A&M)	18.2	Isaiah Burse (Fresno State)	**1,606**	Raheem Mostert (Purdue)	33.5
2012			Tramaine Thompson (Kansas St.)	19.8			Quincy McDuffie (UCF)	34.2
2013			Ryan Switzer (North Carolina)	20.9			Kermit Whitfield (Florida State)	36.4
2014			Tyler Lockett (Kansas State)	19.8			J. J. Nelson (UAB)	38.3
2015			Christian Kirk (Texas A&M)	24.4			Evan Berry (Tennessee)	38.3
2016			Christian Kirk (Texas A&M)	21.7			Kylen Towner (Western Kentucky)	40.3
2017			Dante Pettis (Washington)	20.4			Tony Pollard (Memphis)	40.0
2018			Marcus Hayes (New Mexico)	21.2			Savon Scarver (Utah State)	33.7
2019			Jaylen Waddle (Alabama)	24.4			Deion Hair-Griffin (North Texas)	40.8
2020			Marcus Jones (Houston)	19.8			De'Montre Tuggle (Ohio)	45.0
2021	Britain Covey (Utah)	427	Kalil Pimpleton (Central Michigan)	19.1	Alan Lamar (Arkansas State)	1,333	Zonovan Knight (NC State)	34.4
2022	Eric Garror (Louisiana)	392	Dee Williams (Tennessee)	18.7	Johnnie Lang (Arkansas State)	886	Liedeatrick Griffin (Mississippi State)	32.3
2023	Xavier Worthy (Texas)	371	Zachariah Branch (USC)	20.8	Zylan Perry (Louisiana)	862	Barion Brown (Kentucky)	36.0
2024	Kameron Shanks (UAB)	329	Josh Cameron (Baylor)	20.7	Kaden Wetjen (Iowa)	727	Jacquez Stuart (Toledo)	32.7
2025	Kaden Wetjen (Iowa)	563	Kaden Wetjen (Iowa)	26.8	Kole Wilson (Baylor)	705	Jadarian Price (Notre Dame)	37.5
