= Wally Triplett =

American football player (1926–2018)

Wallace Triplett
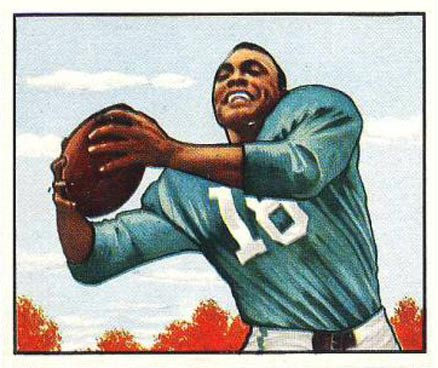
- Triplett on a 1950 Bowman football card

No. 18, 40, 47
- Positions: Halfback, defensive back

Personal information
- Born: April 18, 1926; La Mott, Pennsylvania, U.S.
- Died: November 8, 2018 (aged 92); Detroit, Michigan, U.S.
- Listed height: 5 ft 10 in (1.78 m)
- Listed weight: 170 lb (77 kg)

Career information
- High school: Cheltenham (Wyncote, Pennsylvania)
- College: Penn State (1946–1948)
- NFL draft: 1949: 19th round, 182nd overall pick

Career history
- Detroit Lions (1949–1950); Chicago Cardinals (1952–1953)

Career NFL statistics
- Rushing yards: 321
- Rushing average: 4.6
- Receptions: 17
- Receiving yards: 175
- Total touchdowns: 4
- Stats at Pro Football Reference

Wallace Triplett (April 18, 1926 – November 8, 2018) was an American professional football player, the first African-American draftee to play for a National Football League (NFL) team. For that reason, his portrait hangs in the Pro Football Hall of Fame in Canton, Ohio.

== Early life ==
Triplett, the son of a postal worker, was born and raised in the Philadelphia suburb of La Mott, Pennsylvania, part of Cheltenham Township. His reputation as a talented high school football player, combined with his upscale address, prompted the University of Miami to offer him a scholarship sight unseen, under the assumption Triplett was white. The then-segregated university rescinded the scholarship when they discovered Triplett was black. Triplett instead earned a Senatorial Scholarship for his academics and chose to attend Penn State University in the fall of 1945.

== Penn State ==
Along with Dennis Hoggard, Triplett was one of the first African-Americans to take the field in a varsity football game for the Penn State Nittany Lions. During the 1946 season, the Penn State team voted to cancel a regular-season game in Miami against the Miami Hurricanes, rather than compromise by not bringing their black players. Miami, like other southern schools at the time, refused to compete against integrated schools unless they left their black players at home.

In 1948, Triplett became the first African-American to play in the Cotton Bowl Classic, catching the tying touchdown in Penn State's 13–13 tie with Southern Methodist University.

Triplett also co-founded the Gamma Nu chapter of Alpha Phi Alpha while at Penn State. Triplett returned to Penn State on November 11, 2015, to meet with head coach James Franklin and the team after their bye-week scrimmage.

== NFL ==
Although Triplett was the third African-American chosen in the 1949 NFL draft, he was the first of the draftees to take the field in a league game. Undrafted "free agent" African-Americans had previously played in the league. The 5'-10", 173-pound running back and return specialist played for the Detroit Lions from 1949 to 1950.

On October 29, 1950, in a game against the Los Angeles Rams, Triplett set the Lions' single-game record for kickoff return yardage with 294 yards, the third-highest total (NFL record is 304 yards) in NFL history, including a 97-yard touchdown return. He accomplished this despite only returning four kicks, which gives him the single-game all-time NFL record for average yards-per-return (min. three returns).

== Later life and death ==
Following the 1950 season, Triplett became the first NFL player drafted into military service for the Korean War. When he returned from active duty, the Lions traded him to the Chicago Cardinals. He retired from professional football in 1953. After his playing days, Triplett worked as a teacher, in the insurance business, and in management for the Chrysler Corporation. Triplett died on November 8, 2018, at age 92.
