= 1948 Princeton Tigers football team =

American college football season

1948 Princeton Tigers football
- Conference: Independent
- Record: 4–4
- Head coach: Charlie Caldwell (4th season)
- Home stadium: Palmer Stadium

1948 Ivy Group football standings
| | Conf. | | | | | Overall |
| Team | W | | L | | T | W | | L | | T |
|---|---|---|---|---|---|---|---|---|---|---|
| No. 19 Cornell | 4 | – | 0 | – | 0 | 8 | – | 1 | – | 0 |
| Penn | 3 | – | 1 | – | 0 | 5 | – | 3 | – | 0 |
| Dartmouth | 4 | – | 2 | – | 0 | 6 | – | 2 | – | 0 |
| Brown | 1 | – | 2 | – | 0 | 7 | – | 2 | – | 0 |
| Princeton | 3 | – | 3 | – | 0 | 4 | – | 4 | – | 0 |
| Harvard | 3 | – | 3 | – | 0 | 4 | – | 4 | – | 0 |
| Yale | 1 | – | 4 | – | 0 | 4 | – | 5 | – | 0 |
| Columbia | 1 | – | 5 | – | 0 | 4 | – | 5 | – | 0 |
Rankings from AP Poll

The 1948 Princeton Tigers football team was an American football team that represented Princeton University as an independent during the 1948 college football season. In its fourth season under head coach Charlie Caldwell, the team compiled a 4–4 record and outscored opponents by a total of 184 to 156.

Princeton was ranked at No. 41 in the final Litkenhous Difference by Score System ratings for 1948.

Princeton played its 1948 home games at Palmer Stadium in Princeton, New Jersey.

== Schedule ==
| Date | Opponent | Site | Result | Attendance | Source |
|---|---|---|---|---|---|
| October 2 | Brown | Palmer Stadium; Princeton, NJ | L 20–23 | 26,000 | |
| October 9 | at No. 12 Penn | Franklin Field; Philadelphia, PA (rivalry) | L 7–29 | 60,000 | |
| October 16 | Rutgers | Palmer Stadium; Princeton, NJ (rivalry) | L 6–22 | 41,000 | |
| October 23 | at Columbia | Baker Field; New York, NY | W 16–14 | 30,000 | |
| October 30 | Virginia | Palmer Stadium; Princeton, NJ | W 55–14 | 23,000 | |
| November 6 | Harvard | Palmer Stadium; Princeton, NJ (rivalry) | W 47–7 | 37,000 | |
| November 13 | at Yale | Yale Bowl; New Haven, CT (rivalry) | W 20–14 | 57,000 | |
| November 20 | Dartmouth | Palmer Stadium; Princeton, NJ | L 13–33 | 40,000 | |
Rankings from AP Poll released prior to the game
