= Tom Wham (American football) =

American football player (1924–2006)

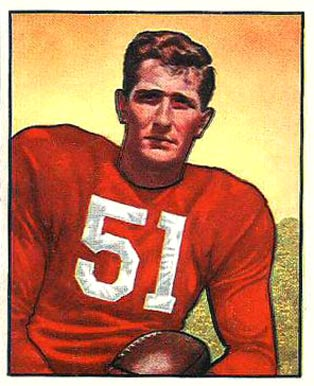

No. 51
- Positions: Defensive end, end

Personal information
- Born: November 22, 1924; Greenville, South Carolina, U.S.
- Died: December 25, 2006 (aged 82); Greenville, South Carolina, U.S.
- Listed height: 6 ft 2 in (1.88 m)
- Listed weight: 217 lb (98 kg)

Career information
- High school: Thornwell Orphanage (Clinton, South Carolina)
- College: Furman
- NFL draft: 1949: 5th round, 50th overall pick

Career history
- Chicago Cardinals (1949–1951)

Awards and highlights
- Pro Bowl (1951)

Career NFL statistics
- Receptions: 1
- Receiving yards: 11
- Interceptions: 1
- Total touchdowns: 2
- Stats at Pro Football Reference

Thomas Arthur Wham (November 22, 1924 – December 25, 2006) was an American professional football player who was a defensive end for the Chicago Cardinals of the National Football League (NFL). He played college football for the Furman Paladins.

Wham lived at the Thornwill Orphanage in Clinton, South Carolina, starting at age 12. He played college football at Furman University from 1946 to 1948 and was inducted into the Furman Athletic Hall of Fame in 1982. He served in the Navy during World War II. He later worked for the South Carolina Department of Corrections, eventually serving as directors of the state's pre-release centers. He died in 2006 at age 82 in Greenville, South Carolina.
