= 1948 Brown Bears football team =

American college football season

1948 Brown Bears football
- Conference: Independent
- Record: 7–2
- Head coach: Rip Engle (5th season)
- Captain: N. J. Lacuele
- Home stadium: Brown Stadium

1948 Ivy Group football standings
	Conf.					Overall
Team	W		L		T	W		L		T
No. 19 Cornell	4	–	0	–	0	8	–	1	–	0
Penn	3	–	1	–	0	5	–	3	–	0
Dartmouth	4	–	2	–	0	6	–	2	–	0
Brown	1	–	2	–	0	7	–	2	–	0
Princeton	3	–	3	–	0	4	–	4	–	0
Harvard	3	–	3	–	0	4	–	4	–	0
Yale	1	–	4	–	0	4	–	5	–	0
Columbia	1	–	5	–	0	4	–	5	–	0
Rankings from AP Poll

The 1948 Brown Bears football team represented Brown University during the 1948 college football season.

In their fifth season under head coach Charles "Rip" Engle, the Bears compiled a 7–2 record, and outscored their opponents 242 to 103. N.J. Lacuele was the team captain.

Brown was ranked at No. 55 in the final Litkenhous Difference by Score System ratings for 1948.

Brown played its home games at Brown Stadium in Providence, Rhode Island.

== Schedule ==
Date	Opponent	Site	Result	Attendance	Source
September 25	at Yale	Yale Bowl; New Haven, CT	L 13–28	31,000	
October 2	at Princeton	Palmer Stadium; Princeton, NJ	W 23–20	26,000	
October 9	Rhode Island State	Brown Stadium; Providence, RI (rivalry)	W 33–0	11,000	
October 16	at Holy Cross	Fitton Field; Worcester, MA	W 14–6	20,000	
October 23	Connecticut	Brown Stadium; Providence, RI	W 49–6	10,000	
October 30	at Rutgers	Rutgers Stadium; Piscataway, NJ	W 20–6	20,000	
November 6	Western Reserve	Brown Stadium; Providence, RI	W 36–0	8,000	
November 13	at Harvard	Harvard Stadium; Boston, MA	L 19–30	25,000	
November 25	Colgate	Brown Stadium; Providence, RI	W 35–7	20,000	
