= 1948 Navy Midshipmen football team =

American college football season

1948 Navy Midshipmen football
- Conference: Independent
- Record: 0–8–1
- Head coach: George Sauer (1st season)
- Captains: Pete Williams; Scott Emerson
- Home stadium: Thompson Stadium

1948 Southern major college football independents records
	Conf.			Overall
Team	W	L	T	W		L		T
West Virginia		–		9	–	3	–	0
Virginia		–		5	–	3	–	1
Chattanooga		–		4	–	5	–	0
Georgetown		–		3	–	4	–	1
Miami (FL)		–		4	–	6	–	0
Navy		–		0	–	8	–	1

The 1948 Navy Midshipmen football team represented the United States Naval Academy during the 1948 college football season. In their first season under head coach George Sauer, the Midshipmen compiled a 0–8–1 record and were outscored by their opponents by a combined score of 227 to 77.

Navy was ranked at No. 53 in the final Litkenhous Difference by Score System ratings for 1948.

== Schedule ==
Date	Opponent	Site	Result	Attendance	Source
September 25	California	Municipal Stadium; Baltimore, MD	L 7–21		
October 2	Cornell	Municipal Stadium; Baltimore, MD	L 7–13	25,000	
October 9	at Duke	Duke Stadium; Durham, NC	L 0–21	25,000	
October 16	No. 12 Missouri	Municipal Stadium; Baltimore, MD	L 14–35		
October 23	at No. 7 Penn	Franklin Field; Philadelphia, PA	L 14–20	75,000	
October 30	No. 2 Notre Dame	Municipal Stadium; Baltimore, MD (rivalry)	L 7–41	63,314	
November 6	at No. 2 Michigan	Michigan Stadium; Ann Arbor, MI	L 0–35	85,808	
November 13	at Columbia	Baker Field; New York, NY	L 0–13	35,000	
November 27	vs. No. 3 Army	Philadelphia Municipal Stadium; Philadelphia, PA (Army–Navy Game)	T 21–21		
Rankings from AP Poll released prior to the game
