= Oliver Fletcher =

American football player (1923–1994)

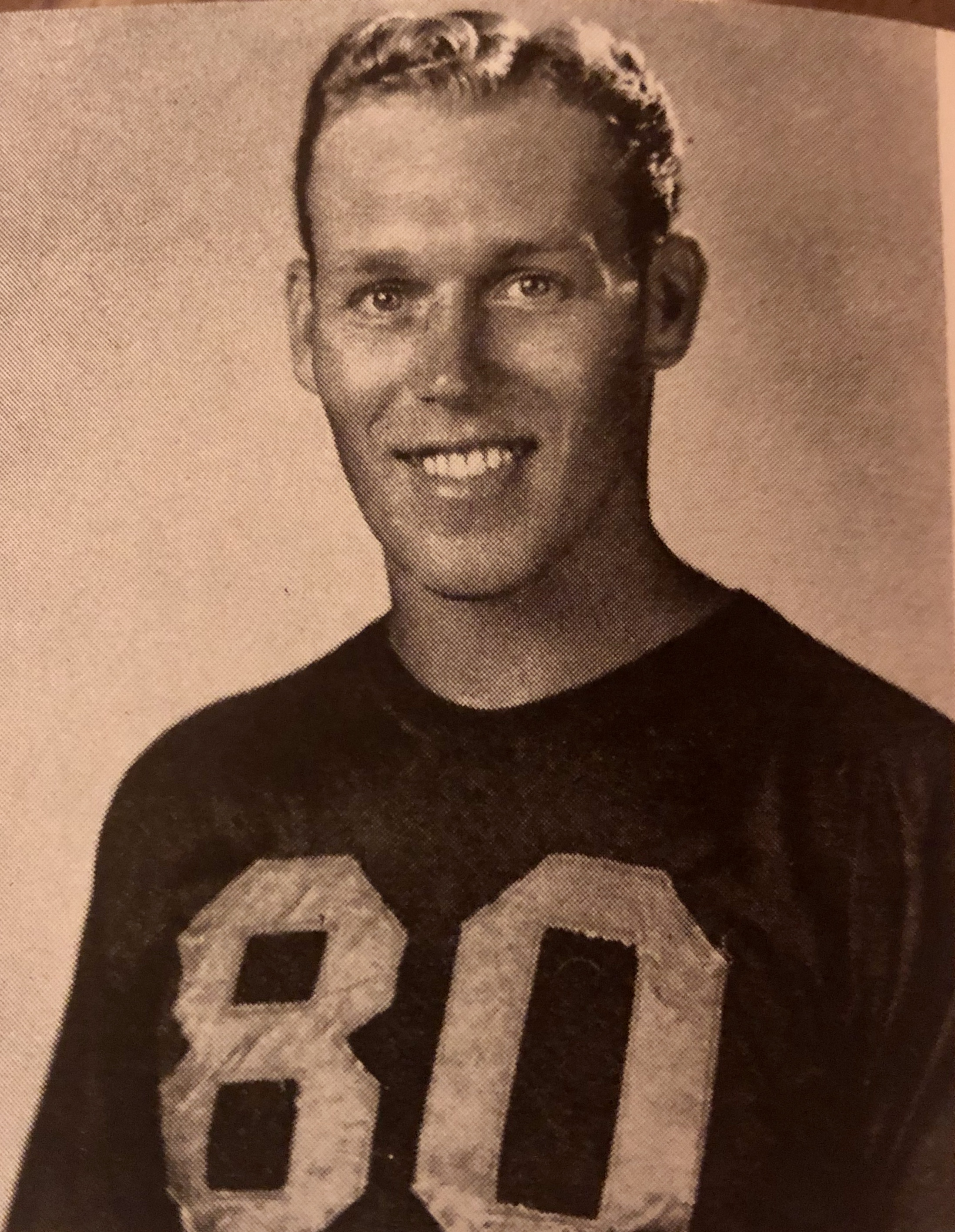
- Fletcher at USC c. 1948

No. 34
- Position: Guard

Personal information
- Born: February 5, 1923; San Diego, California, U.S.
- Died: May 10, 1994 (aged 71); Bullhead City, Arizona, U.S.
- Listed height: 6 ft 3 in (1.91 m)
- Listed weight: 210 lb (95 kg)

Career information
- High school: San Diego
- College: USC (1947–1948)
- NFL draft: 1949: 20th round, 198th overall pick

Career history
- Los Angeles Dons (1949)

Career AAFC statistics
- Games played: 3
- Stats at Pro Football Reference

Oliver C. Fletcher (February 5, 1923 – May 10, 1994) was an American football guard.

Born in San Diego in 1923, he attended San Diego High School. In the fall of 1941, he enrolled at Santa Ana Junior College and played for the football team at the end position. During World War II, he served in the United States Marine Corps, participating in the Battle of Okinawa and the Occupation of Japan. He was also a judo and bayonet instructor for the Marines.

Fletcher returned to Santa Ana Junior College in 1946 where he again played for the school's football team. He then played for the USC Trojans football team in 1947 and 1948. He signed a contract in December 1948 (and again in March 1949) to play professional football with the San Francisco 49ers of the All-America Football Conference (AAFC). He ended up playing for the Los Angeles Dons of the AAFC during the 1949 season, appearing in three games, none as a starter. He died in 1994 in Bullhead City, Arizona.
