= Jerry Krall =

American football player (1927–2019)

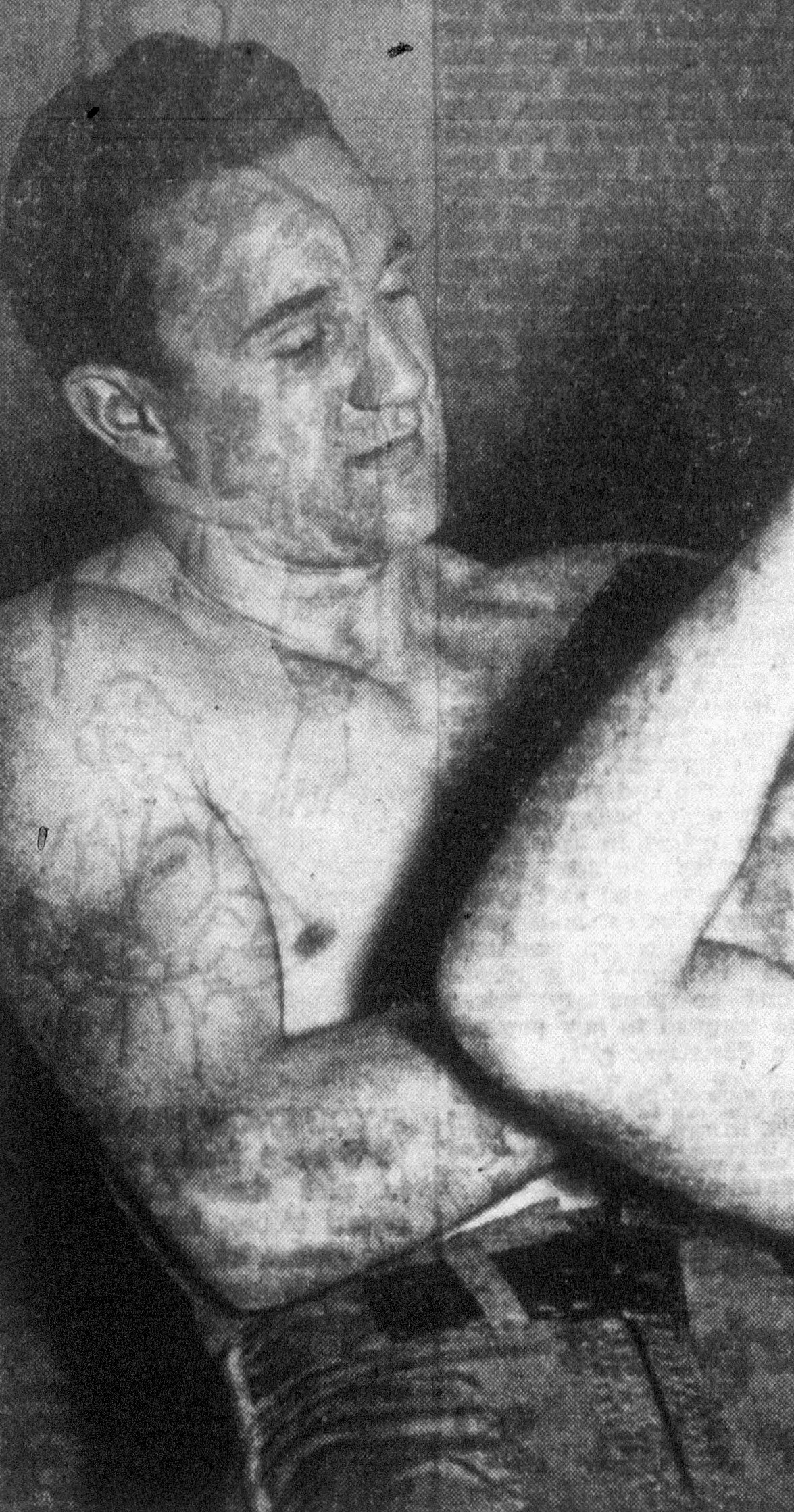
- Krall in 1949

No. 17
- Positions: Halfback, defensive back

Personal information
- Born: April 19, 1927; Toledo, Ohio, U.S.
- Died: June 2, 2019 (aged 92); Rossford, Ohio, U.S.
- Listed height: 6 ft 4 in (1.93 m)
- Listed weight: 240 lb (109 kg)

Career information
- High school: Libbey (Toledo)
- College: Ohio State (1945–1946, 1948–1949)
- NFL draft: 1949: 6th round, 59th overall pick

Career history
- Detroit Lions (1950)

Awards and highlights
- First-team All-Big Nine (1949)

Career NFL statistics
- Receptions: 2
- Receiving yards: 61
- Return yards: 9
- Stats at Pro Football Reference

Gerald Stanley Krall (April 19, 1927 – June 2, 2019) was an American professional football halfback and defensive back who played for the Detroit Lions. He played college football at Ohio State University, having previously attended Edward D. Libbey High School.
