= Ed Berrang =

American football player (1922–1992)

No. 18, 85, 82, 81
- Positions: Defensive end, end

Personal information
- Born: October 14, 1922; New Philadelphia, Pennsylvania, U.S.
- Died: July 3, 1992 (aged 69); Bethesda, Maryland, U.S.
- Listed height: 6 ft 2 in (1.88 m)
- Listed weight: 206 lb (93 kg)

Career information
- College: Villanova
- NFL draft: 1949: 5th round, 48th overall pick

Career history
- Washington Redskins (1949–1951); Detroit Lions (1951); Green Bay Packers (1952); Washington Redskins (1952)

Career NFL statistics
- Interceptions: 3
- Fumble recoveries: 10
- Receptions: 2
- Receiving yards: 19
- Stats at Pro Football Reference

Edward Patrick Berrang (October 14, 1922 – July 3, 1992) was an American professional football defensive end in the National Football League (NFL) for the Washington Redskins, the Detroit Lions and the Green Bay Packers. He played college football at Villanova University and was drafted in the fifth round of the 1949 NFL draft.
