= 1948 Chattanooga Moccasins football team =

American college football season

1948 Chattanooga Moccasins football
- Conference: Independent
- Record: 4–5
- Head coach: Scrappy Moore (18th season)
- Captain: Ralph Hutchinson
- Home stadium: Chamberlain Field

1948 Southern major college football independents records
	Conf.			Overall
Team	W	L	T	W		L		T
West Virginia		–		9	–	3	–	0
Virginia		–		5	–	3	–	1
Chattanooga		–		4	–	5	–	0
Georgetown		–		3	–	4	–	1
Miami (FL)		–		4	–	6	–	0
Navy		–		0	–	8	–	1

The 1948 Chattanooga Moccasins football team was an American football team that represented the University of Chattanooga (now known as the University of Tennessee at Chattanooga) as an independent during the 1948 college football season. In its 18th year under head coach Scrappy Moore, the team compiled a 4–5 record.

Chattanooga was ranked at No. 78 in the final Litkenhous Difference by Score System ratings for 1948.

== Schedule ==
Date	Opponent	Site	Result	Attendance	Source
September 25	at Georgia	Sanford Stadium; Athens, GA	L 7–14	12,500	
October 1	Tennessee Tech	Chamberlain Field; Chattanooga, TN	W 18–7	8,000	
October 9	at No. 20 Tennessee	Shields–Watkins Field; Knoxville, TN	L 0–26		
October 16	Presbyterian	Chamberlain Field; Chattanooga, TN	W 35–0	5,000	
October 23	NC State	Chamberlain Field; Chattanooga, TN	L 0–7	5,000	
October 30	at Evansville	Bosse Field; Evansville, IN	W 27–0	7,000	
November 6	Ole Miss^{†}	Chamberlain Field; Chattanooga, TN	L 7–34	7,500	
November 12	at Miami (FL)	Burdine Stadium; Miami, FL	L 0–19	28,548	
November 25	Dayton	Chamberlain Field; Chattanooga, TN	W 21–6	11,000	
^{†}Homecoming; Rankings from AP Poll released prior to the game
