= 1948 Florida Gators football team =

American college football season

1948 Florida Gators football
- Conference: Southeastern Conference
- Record: 5–5 (1–5 SEC)
- Head coach: Raymond Wolf (3rd season)
- Offensive scheme: T formation
- Captain: Fletcher Groves
- Home stadium: Florida Field

1948 Southeastern Conference football standings
| | Conf. | | | | | Overall |
| Team | W | | L | | T | W | | L | | T |
|---|---|---|---|---|---|---|---|---|---|---|
| No. 8 Georgia $ | 6 | – | 0 | – | 0 | 9 | – | 2 | – | 0 |
| No. 15 Ole Miss | 6 | – | 1 | – | 0 | 8 | – | 1 | – | 0 |
| No. 13 Tulane | 5 | – | 1 | – | 0 | 9 | – | 1 | – | 0 |
| No. 12 Vanderbilt | 4 | – | 2 | – | 1 | 8 | – | 2 | – | 1 |
| Georgia Tech | 4 | – | 3 | – | 0 | 7 | – | 3 | – | 0 |
| Alabama | 4 | – | 4 | – | 1 | 6 | – | 4 | – | 1 |
| Mississippi State | 3 | – | 3 | – | 0 | 4 | – | 4 | – | 1 |
| Tennessee | 2 | – | 3 | – | 1 | 4 | – | 4 | – | 2 |
| Kentucky | 1 | – | 3 | – | 1 | 5 | – | 3 | – | 2 |
| Florida | 1 | – | 5 | – | 0 | 5 | – | 5 | – | 0 |
| LSU | 1 | – | 5 | – | 0 | 3 | – | 7 | – | 0 |
| Auburn | 0 | – | 7 | – | 0 | 1 | – | 8 | – | 1 |
$ – Conference champion; Rankings from AP Poll

The 1948 Florida Gators football team represented the University of Florida during the 1948 college football season. The season was the third for Raymond Wolf as the Florida Gators football team's head coach. The season's highlights included the Gators' 16–9 win against the Auburn Tigers and their 27–13 homecoming victory over the Miami Hurricanes. Wolf's 1948 Florida Gators finished with a 5–5 overall record and a 1–5 record in the Southeastern Conference (SEC), placing tenth among twelve SEC teams.

Florida was ranked at No. 59 in the final Litkenhous Difference by Score System ratings for 1948.

== Schedule ==
| Date | Opponent | Site | Result | Attendance | Source |
|---|---|---|---|---|---|
| September 25 | Ole Miss | Florida Field; Gainesville, FL | L 0–14 | 24,000 | |
| October 2 | Tulsa* | Florida Field; Gainesville, FL | W 28–14 | 15,000 | |
| October 9 | vs. Auburn | Phillips Field; Tampa, FL (rivalry) | W 16–9 | 18,000 | |
| October 16 | Rollins* | Florida Field; Gainesville, FL | W 41–12 | 16,000 | |
| October 23 | at No. 6 Georgia Tech | Grant Field; Atlanta, GA | L 7–42 | 28,000 | |
| October 30 | at Furman* | Sirrine Stadium; Greenville, SC | W 39–14 | 6,500 | |
| November 6 | vs. No. 13 Georgia | Gator Bowl Stadium; Jacksonville, FL (rivalry) | L 12–20 | 34,129 | |
| November 13 | at Kentucky | McLean Stadium; Lexington, KY (rivalry) | L 15–34 | 22,000 | |
| November 20 | Miami (FL)*^{†} | Florida Field; Gainesville, FL (rivalry) | W 27–13 | 27,000 | |
| November 27 | at Alabama | Denny Stadium; Tuscaloosa, AL (rivalry) | L 28–34 | 24,000 | |
*Non-conference game; ^{†}Homecoming; Rankings from AP Poll released prior to the game

== Postseason ==
Several members of the Florida Board of Control and a number of Florida alumni called for Wolf to step down after the 1948 season, but football player-led student rallies in his support ended with Wolf's contract being extended for another year.
