= Bill Geyer =

American football player (1919–2004)

No. 7, 11
- Position: Halfback

Personal information
- Born: October 3, 1919; Bloomfield, New Jersey, U.S.
- Died: June 4, 2004 (aged 84); Glen Ridge, New Jersey, U.S.
- Listed height: 5 ft 10 in (1.78 m)
- Listed weight: 173 lb (78 kg)

Career information
- High school: Bloomfield
- College: Colgate
- NFL draft: 1942: 11th round, 100th overall pick

Career history
- Chicago Bears (1942–1943, 1946)

Awards and highlights
- 2× NFL champion (1943, 1946)

Career NFL statistics
- Rushing yards: 54
- Rushing average: 2.2
- Receptions: 6
- Receiving yards: 145
- Total touchdowns: 4
- Stats at Pro Football Reference

William Herbert Geyer Jr. (October 3, 1919 – June 4, 2004) was a professional American football halfback in the National Football League (NFL). He played three seasons for the Chicago Bears (1942–1943, 1946).

== See also ==
- List of NCAA major college yearly punt and kickoff return leaders
