= 1948 Auburn Tigers football team =

American college football season

1948 Auburn Tigers football
- Conference: Southeastern Conference
- Record: 1–8–1 (0–7 SEC)
- Head coach: Earl Brown (1st season)
- Home stadium: Auburn Stadium; Cramton Bowl; Ladd Memorial Stadium

1948 Southeastern Conference football standings
	Conf.					Overall
Team	W		L		T	W		L		T
No. 8 Georgia $	6	–	0	–	0	9	–	2	–	0
No. 15 Ole Miss	6	–	1	–	0	8	–	1	–	0
No. 13 Tulane	5	–	1	–	0	9	–	1	–	0
No. 12 Vanderbilt	4	–	2	–	1	8	–	2	–	1
Georgia Tech	4	–	3	–	0	7	–	3	–	0
Alabama	4	–	4	–	1	6	–	4	–	1
Mississippi State	3	–	3	–	0	4	–	4	–	1
Tennessee	2	–	3	–	1	4	–	4	–	2
Kentucky	1	–	3	–	1	5	–	3	–	2
Florida	1	–	5	–	0	5	–	5	–	0
LSU	1	–	5	–	0	3	–	7	–	0
Auburn	0	–	7	–	0	1	–	8	–	1
$ – Conference champion; Rankings from AP Poll

The 1948 Auburn Tigers football team represented Auburn University in the 1948 college football season. It was the Tigers' 57th overall and 16th season as a member of the Southeastern Conference (SEC). The team was led by head coach Earl Brown, in his first year, and played their home games at Auburn Stadium in Auburn, the Cramton Bowl in Montgomery and Ladd Memorial Stadium in Mobile, Alabama. They finished the season with a record of one win, eight losses and one tie (1–8–1 overall, 0–7 in the SEC). Auburn was ranked at No. 103 in the final Litkenhous Difference by Score System ratings for 1948.

After 41 years of dormancy, 1948 marked the return of the Iron Bowl rivalry with Alabama, the teams have played every year uninterrupted since 1948.

== Schedule ==
Date	Opponent	Site	Result	Attendance	Source
September 24	Mississippi Southern*	Cramton Bowl; Montgomery, AL	W 20–14	16,000	
October 2	Louisiana Tech*^{†}	Auburn Stadium; Auburn, AL	T 13–13	12,000	
October 9	vs. Florida	Phillips Field; Tampa, FL (rivalry)	L 9–16	18,000	
October 16	at No. 7 Georgia Tech	Grant Field; Atlanta, GA (rivalry)	L 0–27	38,000	
October 23	at No. 17 Tulane	Tulane Stadium; New Orleans, LA (rivalry)	L 6–21	35,000	
October 29	Vanderbilt	Cramton Bowl; Montgomery, AL	L 0–47	18,000	
November 6	Mississippi State	Legion Field; Birmingham, AL	L 0–20	15,000	
November 13	vs. No. 13 Georgia	Memorial Stadium; Columbus, GA (rivalry)	L 14–42	20,000	
November 27	No. 9 Clemson*	Ladd Memorial Stadium; Mobile, AL (rivalry)	L 6–7	14,110	
December 4	vs. Alabama	Legion Field; Birmingham, AL (Iron Bowl)	L 0–55	46,000	
*Non-conference game; ^{†}Homecoming; Rankings from AP Poll released prior to the game
