= 1948 Dartmouth Indians football team =

American college football season

1948 Dartmouth Indians football
- Conference: Independent
- Record: 6–2
- Head coach: Tuss McLaughry (6th season)
- Captain: Dale Armstrong
- Home stadium: Memorial Field

1948 Ivy Group football standings
	Conf.					Overall
Team	W		L		T	W		L		T
No. 19 Cornell	4	–	0	–	0	8	–	1	–	0
Penn	3	–	1	–	0	5	–	3	–	0
Dartmouth	4	–	2	–	0	6	–	2	–	0
Brown	1	–	2	–	0	7	–	2	–	0
Princeton	3	–	3	–	0	4	–	4	–	0
Harvard	3	–	3	–	0	4	–	4	–	0
Yale	1	–	4	–	0	4	–	5	–	0
Columbia	1	–	5	–	0	4	–	5	–	0
Rankings from AP Poll

The 1948 Dartmouth Indians football team was an American football team that represented Dartmouth College as an independent during the 1948 college football season. In their sixth season under head coach Tuss McLaughry, the Indians compiled a 6–2 record, and outscored their opponents 213 to 130. Dale Armstrong was the team captain.

Dartmouth was ranked at No. 27 in the final Litkenhous Difference by Score System ratings for 1948.

Dartmouth played its home games at Memorial Field on the college campus in Hanover, New Hampshire.

== Schedule ==
Date	Opponent	Site	Result	Attendance	Source
October 2	at Penn	Franklin Field; Philadelphia, PA	L 13–26	60,000	
October 9	Holy Cross	Memorial Field; Hanover, NH	W 19–6	55,000	
October 16	Colgate	Memorial Field; Hanover, NH	W 41–16	12,000	
October 23	at Harvard	Harvard Stadium; Boston, MA (rivalry)	W 14–7	46,000	
October 30	at Yale	Yale Bowl; New Haven, CT	W 41–14	66,000	
November 6	Columbia	Memorial Field; Hanover, NH	W 26–21	16,000	
November 13	at Cornell	Schoellkopf Field; Ithaca, NY (rivalry)	L 26–27	30,000	
November 20	at Princeton	Palmer Stadium; Princeton, NJ	W 33–13	40,000	
