= 1948 Cornell Big Red football team =

American college football season

1948 Cornell Big Red football
- Conference: Independent

Ranking
- AP: No. 19
- Record: 8–1
- Head coach: George K. James (2nd season)
- Home stadium: Schoellkopf Field

1948 Ivy Group football standings
	Conf.					Overall
Team	W		L		T	W		L		T
No. 19 Cornell	4	–	0	–	0	8	–	1	–	0
Penn	3	–	1	–	0	5	–	3	–	0
Dartmouth	4	–	2	–	0	6	–	2	–	0
Brown	1	–	2	–	0	7	–	2	–	0
Princeton	3	–	3	–	0	4	–	4	–	0
Harvard	3	–	3	–	0	4	–	4	–	0
Yale	1	–	4	–	0	4	–	5	–	0
Columbia	1	–	5	–	0	4	–	5	–	0
Rankings from AP Poll

The 1948 Cornell Big Red football team was an American football team that represented Cornell University during the 1948 college football season. In its second season under head coach George K. James, the team compiled a 8–1 record and outscored opponents 224 to 112.

Cornell played its home games in Schoellkopf Field in Ithaca, New York.

Bob Dean's point after touchdown kick gave Cornell a dramatic come-from behind win over Dartmouth.

== Schedule ==
Date	Opponent	Rank	Site	Result	Attendance	Source
September 25	NYU		Schoellkopf Field; Ithaca, NY	W 47–6	14,000	
October 2	at Navy		Municipal Stadium; Baltimore, MD	W 13–7	25,000	
October 9	No. 18 Harvard		Schoellkopf Field; Ithaca, NY	W 40–6	25,000	
October 16	at Syracuse	No. 13	Archbold Stadium; Syracuse, NY	W 34–7	30,000	
October 23	No. 5 Army	No. 12	Schoellkopf Field; Ithaca, NY	L 6–27	35,000	
October 30	at Columbia		Baker Field; New York, NY (rivalry)	W 20–13	35,000	
November 6	Colgate		Schoellkopf Field; Ithaca, NY (rivalry)	W 14–6	18,000	
November 13	Dartmouth		Schoellkopf Field; Ithaca, NY (rivalry)	W 27–26	30,000	
November 25	at No. 19 Penn		Franklin Field; Philadelphia, PA (rivalry)	W 23–14	78,000	
Rankings from AP Poll released prior to the game

== Rankings ==
Ranking movements Legend: ██ Increase in ranking ██ Decrease in ranking — = Not ranked
	Week								
Poll	1	2	3	4	5	6	7	8	Final
AP	—	13	12	—	—	—	19	—	19
