= 1948 Vanderbilt Commodores football team =

American college football season

1948 Vanderbilt Commodores football
- Conference: Southeastern Conference

Ranking
- AP: No. 12
- Record: 8–2–1 (4–2–1 SEC)
- Head coach: Red Sanders (6th season)
- Offensive scheme: Single-wing
- Captain: John Clark
- Home stadium: Dudley Field

1948 Southeastern Conference football standings
| | Conf. | | | | | Overall |
| Team | W | | L | | T | W | | L | | T |
|---|---|---|---|---|---|---|---|---|---|---|
| No. 8 Georgia $ | 6 | – | 0 | – | 0 | 9 | – | 2 | – | 0 |
| No. 15 Ole Miss | 6 | – | 1 | – | 0 | 8 | – | 1 | – | 0 |
| No. 13 Tulane | 5 | – | 1 | – | 0 | 9 | – | 1 | – | 0 |
| No. 12 Vanderbilt | 4 | – | 2 | – | 1 | 8 | – | 2 | – | 1 |
| Georgia Tech | 4 | – | 3 | – | 0 | 7 | – | 3 | – | 0 |
| Alabama | 4 | – | 4 | – | 1 | 6 | – | 4 | – | 1 |
| Mississippi State | 3 | – | 3 | – | 0 | 4 | – | 4 | – | 1 |
| Tennessee | 2 | – | 3 | – | 1 | 4 | – | 4 | – | 2 |
| Kentucky | 1 | – | 3 | – | 1 | 5 | – | 3 | – | 2 |
| Florida | 1 | – | 5 | – | 0 | 5 | – | 5 | – | 0 |
| LSU | 1 | – | 5 | – | 0 | 3 | – | 7 | – | 0 |
| Auburn | 0 | – | 7 | – | 0 | 1 | – | 8 | – | 1 |
$ – Conference champion; Rankings from AP Poll

The 1948 Vanderbilt Commodores football team was an American football team that represented Vanderbilt University as a member of the Southeastern Conference (SEC) during the 1948 college football season. In their sixth year under head coach Red Sanders, the Commodores compiled an overall record of 8–2–1, with a conference record of 4–2–1, and finished ninth in the SEC.

This was Red Sanders's last season as the Commodores' head coach. Vanderbilt lost their first game of the season to Georgia Tech, tied their second with Alabama, and then lost the next to Mississippi, who finished the season 8–1. Vanderbilt won the last eight games of the season, which ties as the school's second longest and remained the longest win streak for the program until a seven-game streak to end the 2012 season. The 1948 Vanderbilt team outscored their opponents 328 to 73 and posted four shutouts. The Commodores played only four home games at Dudley Field in Nashville, Tennessee. Lee Nalley broke the record for punt return yardage.

== Schedule ==
| Date | Opponent | Rank | Site | Result | Attendance | Source |
|---|---|---|---|---|---|---|
| September 25 | Georgia Tech | | Dudley Field; Nashville, TN (rivalry) | L 0–13 | 22,000 | |
| October 2 | at Alabama | | Ladd Stadium; Mobile, AL | T 14–14 | 36,000 | |
| October 9 | at No. 13 Ole Miss | | Hemingway Stadium; Oxford, MS (rivalry) | L 7–20 | 22,500 | |
| October 16 | at Kentucky | | McLean Stadium; Lexington, KY (rivalry) | W 26–7 | 25,000 | |
| October 23 | at Yale* | | Yale Bowl; New Haven, CT | W 35–0 | 30,000 | |
| October 29 | at Auburn | | Cramton Bowl; Montgomery, AL | W 47–0 | 18,000 | |
| November 6 | LSU | | Dudley Field; Nashville, TN | W 48–7 | 21,000 | |
| November 13 | Marshall* | | Dudley Field; Nashville, TN | W 56–0 | 16,000 | |
| November 20 | at Maryland* | | Griffith Stadium; Washington, DC | W 34–0 | 21,000 | |
| November 27 | Tennessee | No. 15 | Dudley Field; Nashville, TN (rivalry) | W 28–6 | 24,074 | |
| December 3 | at Miami (FL)* | No. 12 | Burdine Stadium; Miami, FL | W 33–6 | 28,952 | |
*Non-conference game; Rankings from AP Poll released prior to the game

== Rankings ==
Ranking movements Legend: ██ Increase in ranking ██ Decrease in ranking — = Not ranked ( ) = First-place votes
| | Week | | | | | | | | |
| Poll | 1 | 2 | 3 | 4 | 5 | 6 | 7 | 8 | Final |
|---|---|---|---|---|---|---|---|---|---|
| AP | — | — | — | — | — | — | — | 15 | 12 (2) |
