= 1948 Georgia Bulldogs football team =

American college football season

1948 Georgia Bulldogs football

SEC champion

Orange Bowl, L 28–41 vs. Texas
- Conference: Southeastern Conference

Ranking
- AP: No. 8
- Record: 9–2 (6–0 SEC)
- Head coach: Wally Butts (10th season)
- Home stadium: Sanford Stadium

1948 Southeastern Conference football standings
	Conf.					Overall
Team	W		L		T	W		L		T
No. 8 Georgia $	6	–	0	–	0	9	–	2	–	0
No. 15 Ole Miss	6	–	1	–	0	8	–	1	–	0
No. 13 Tulane	5	–	1	–	0	9	–	1	–	0
No. 12 Vanderbilt	4	–	2	–	1	8	–	2	–	1
Georgia Tech	4	–	3	–	0	7	–	3	–	0
Alabama	4	–	4	–	1	6	–	4	–	1
Mississippi State	3	–	3	–	0	4	–	4	–	1
Tennessee	2	–	3	–	1	4	–	4	–	2
Kentucky	1	–	3	–	1	5	–	3	–	2
Florida	1	–	5	–	0	5	–	5	–	0
LSU	1	–	5	–	0	3	–	7	–	0
Auburn	0	–	7	–	0	1	–	8	–	1
$ – Conference champion; Rankings from AP Poll

The 1948 Georgia Bulldogs football team represented the University of Georgia as a member of the Southeastern Conference (SEC) during the 1948 college football season. Led by tenth-year head coach Wally Butts, the Bulldogs compiled an overall record of 9–2 with a mark of 6–0 in conference play, winning the SEC title. Georgia was invited to the Orange Bowl, where the Bulldogs lost to Texas. The team played home games at Sanford Stadium in Athens, Georgia.

== Schedule ==
Date	Opponent	Rank	Site	Result	Attendance	Source
September 25	Chattanooga*		Sanford Stadium; Athens, GA	W 14–7	12,500	
October 2	North Carolina*		Sanford Stadium; Athens, GA	L 14–21	44,000	
October 9	Kentucky		Sanford Stadium; Athens, GA	W 35–12	23,000	
October 16	at LSU	No. 16	Tiger Stadium; Baton Rouge, LA	W 22–0	37,000	
October 22	at Miami (FL)*		Burdine Stadium; Miami, FL	W 42–21	46,127	
October 30	at Alabama	No. 18	Legion Field; Birmingham, AL (rivalry)	W 35–0	45,000	
November 6	vs. Florida	No. 13	Fairfield Stadium; Jacksonville, FL (rivalry)	W 20–12	34,129	
November 13	vs. Auburn	No. 13	Memorial Stadium; Columbus, GA (rivalry)	W 42–14	20,000	
November 20	Furman*	No. 11	Sanford Stadium; Athens, GA	W 33–0	17,000	
November 27	Georgia Tech^{†}	No. 12	Sanford Stadium; Athens, GA (rivalry)	W 21–13	52,000	
January 1, 1949	vs. Texas*	No. 8	Burdine Stadium; Miami, FL (Orange Bowl)	L 28–41	60,523	
*Non-conference game; ^{†}Homecoming; Rankings from AP Poll released prior to the game

== Rankings ==
Ranking movements Legend: ██ Increase in ranking ██ Decrease in ranking — = Not ranked ( ) = First-place votes
	Week								
Poll	1	2	3	4	5	6	7	8	Final
AP	—	16	—	18	13	13 (1)	11 (2)	12 (1)	8 (5)
