= Larry Lauer =

American football player (1927–1992)

No. 58
- Position: Center

Personal information
- Born: August 27, 1927; Chicago, Illinois, U.S.
- Died: January 3, 1992 (aged 64); Las Vegas, Nevada, U.S.
- Listed height: 6 ft 3 in (1.91 m)
- Listed weight: 232 lb (105 kg)

Career information
- High school: New Trier (Illinois)
- College: Alabama
- NFL draft: 1951: 8th round, 94th overall pick

Career history
- Green Bay Packers (1956–1957)

Career NFL statistics
- Games played: 18
- Fumble recoveries: 1
- Stats at Pro Football Reference

Larry Lauer (August 27, 1927 – January 3, 1992) was a center in the National Football League.

== Biography ==
Lauer was born Lawrence Gene Lauer on August 27, 1927, in Chicago, Illinois.

== Career ==
Lauer was drafted in the eighth round of the 1951 NFL draft by the New York Yanks and later played two seasons with the Green Bay Packers. He played at the collegiate level at the University of Alabama.
