= 1948 Tulane Green Wave football team =

American college football season

1948 Tulane Green Wave football
- Conference: Southeastern Conference

Ranking
- AP: No. 13
- Record: 9–1 (5–1 SEC)
- Head coach: Henry Frnka (3rd season)
- Captain: Emile O'Brien
- Home stadium: Tulane Stadium

1948 Southeastern Conference football standings
	Conf.					Overall
Team	W		L		T	W		L		T
No. 8 Georgia $	6	–	0	–	0	9	–	2	–	0
No. 15 Ole Miss	6	–	1	–	0	8	–	1	–	0
No. 13 Tulane	5	–	1	–	0	9	–	1	–	0
No. 12 Vanderbilt	4	–	2	–	1	8	–	2	–	1
Georgia Tech	4	–	3	–	0	7	–	3	–	0
Alabama	4	–	4	–	1	6	–	4	–	1
Mississippi State	3	–	3	–	0	4	–	4	–	1
Tennessee	2	–	3	–	1	4	–	4	–	2
Kentucky	1	–	3	–	1	5	–	3	–	2
Florida	1	–	5	–	0	5	–	5	–	0
LSU	1	–	5	–	0	3	–	7	–	0
Auburn	0	–	7	–	0	1	–	8	–	1
$ – Conference champion; Rankings from AP Poll

The 1948 Tulane Green Wave football team was an American football team that represented Tulane University as a member of the Southeastern Conference (SEC) during the 1948 college football season. In its third year under head coach Henry Frnka, Tulane compiled a 9–1 record (5–1 in conference games), finished third in the SEC, outscored opponents by a total of 207 to 60, and was ranked No. 13 in the final AP poll.

Fullback Eddie Price won first-team honors from both the Associated Press (AP) and United Press (UP) on the 1948 All-SEC football team. Tackle Paul Lea was named to the first team by the AP and the second team by the UP.

The Green Wave played its home games at Tulane Stadium in New Orleans.

== Schedule ==
Date	Opponent	Rank	Site	Result	Attendance	Source
September 25	Alabama		Tulane Stadium; New Orleans, LA	W 21–14	65,000	
October 2	at Georgia Tech		Grant Field; Atlanta, GA	L 7–13	35,000	
October 9	South Carolina*		Tulane Stadium; New Orleans, LA	W 14–0	35,000	
October 16	No. 10 Ole Miss		Tulane Stadium; New Orleans, LA (rivalry)	W 20–7	43,000	
October 23	Auburn	No. 17	Tulane Stadium; New Orleans, LA (rivalry)	W 21–6	35,000	
October 30	Mississippi State	No. 19	Tulane Stadium; New Orleans, LA	W 9–0	45,000	
November 6	VMI*	No. 20	Tulane Stadium; New Orleans, LA	W 28–7		
November 13	Baylor*		Tulane Stadium; New Orleans, LA	W 35–13	45,000	
November 20	at Cincinnati*	No. 14	Nippert Stadium; Cincinnati, OH	W 6–0	12,000	
November 27	at LSU	No. 14	Tiger Stadium; Baton Rouge, LA (Battle for the Rag)	W 46–0	45,000	
*Non-conference game; Rankings from AP Poll released prior to the game

== Rankings ==
Ranking movements Legend: ██ Increase in ranking ██ Decrease in ranking — = Not ranked
	Week								
Poll	1	2	3	4	5	6	7	8	Final
AP	—	—	17	19	20	—	14	14	13
