= 1948 Tennessee Volunteers football team =

American college football season

1948 Tennessee Volunteers football
- Conference: Southeastern Conference
- Record: 4–4–2 (2–3–1 SEC)
- Head coach: Robert Neyland (17th season)
- Offensive scheme: Single-wing
- Home stadium: Shields–Watkins Field

1948 Southeastern Conference football standings
	Conf.					Overall
Team	W		L		T	W		L		T
No. 8 Georgia $	6	–	0	–	0	9	–	2	–	0
No. 15 Ole Miss	6	–	1	–	0	8	–	1	–	0
No. 13 Tulane	5	–	1	–	0	9	–	1	–	0
No. 12 Vanderbilt	4	–	2	–	1	8	–	2	–	1
Georgia Tech	4	–	3	–	0	7	–	3	–	0
Alabama	4	–	4	–	1	6	–	4	–	1
Mississippi State	3	–	3	–	0	4	–	4	–	1
Tennessee	2	–	3	–	1	4	–	4	–	2
Kentucky	1	–	3	–	1	5	–	3	–	2
Florida	1	–	5	–	0	5	–	5	–	0
LSU	1	–	5	–	0	3	–	7	–	0
Auburn	0	–	7	–	0	1	–	8	–	1
$ – Conference champion; Rankings from AP Poll

The 1948 Tennessee Volunteers (variously Tennessee, UT, or the Vols) represented the University of Tennessee in the 1948 college football season. Playing as a member of the Southeastern Conference (SEC), the team was led by head coach Robert Neyland, in his 17th year, and played their home games at Shields–Watkins Field in Knoxville, Tennessee. They finished the season with a record of four wins, four losses and two ties (4–4–2 overall, 2–3–1 in the SEC).

Tennessee was ranked at No. 29 in the final Litkenhous Difference by Score System ratings for 1948.

== Schedule ==
Date	Opponent	Rank	Site	Result	Attendance	Source
September 25	Mississippi State		Shields–Watkins Field; Knoxville, TN	L 6–21	35,000	
October 2	at Duke*		Duke Stadium; Durham, NC	T 7–7	22,000	
October 9	Chattanooga*	No. 20	Shields–Watkins Field; Knoxville, TN	W 26–0		
October 16	Alabama^{†}		Shields–Watkins Field; Knoxville, TN (Third Saturday in October)	W 21–6	45,000	
October 23	Tennessee Tech*		Shields–Watkins Field; Knoxville, TN	W 41–0	12,000	
October 30	No. 3 North Carolina*		Shields–Watkins Field; Knoxville, Tennessee	L 7–14	50,000	
November 6	at No. 6 Georgia Tech		Grant Field; Atlanta, GA (rivalry)	W 13–6	38,000	
November 13	vs. Ole Miss	No. 18	Crump Stadium; Memphis, TN (rivalry)	L 13–16	31,000	
November 20	Kentucky		Shields–Watkins Field; Knoxville, TN (rivalry)	T 0–0	35,000	
November 27	at No. 15 Vanderbilt		Dudley Field; Nashville, TN (rivalry)	L 6–28	24,074	
*Non-conference game; ^{†}Homecoming; Rankings from AP Poll released prior to the game

== Rankings ==
Ranking movements Legend: ██ Increase in ranking ██ Decrease in ranking — = Not ranked
	Week								
Poll	1	2	3	4	5	6	7	8	Final
AP	20	—	—	—	—	18	—	—	—

== Team players drafted into the NFL ==
Player	Position	Round	Pick	NFL club
Al Russas	End	13	122	Detroit Lions
Bob Lund	Back	14	141	Philadelphia Eagles
