= Lee Nalley =

American football player (1925–2003)

No. 25
- Positions: Halfback, safety

Personal information
- Born: March 15, 1925; Nashville, Tennessee, U.S.
- Died: September 14, 2003 (aged 78); Rocky Mount, North Carolina, U.S.
- Listed height: 5 ft 9 in (1.75 m)
- Listed weight: 161 lb (73 kg)

Career information
- High school: Central
- College: Vanderbilt (1947–1949)

Awards and highlights
- NCAA punt return leader (1948, 1949); AP Southeast All-Time team (1920–1969 era)

Lee "Long Gone" Nalley Jr. (March 15, 1925 – September 14, 2003) was a college football player for the Vanderbilt Commodores football team from 1947 to 1949. A prominent halfback and safety man, he broke an NCAA record with 791 punt return yards in 1948. Nalley broke the record in the game against Maryland. He also had the record for return yardage in a career. He was chosen as the return man for an Associated Press Southeast Area All-Time football team 1920–1969 era.

Nalley graduated from Nashville's Central High School in 1943. He then spent two years in the Navy due to World War II before entering Vanderbilt University in 1946. Due to his small size, he had to make the football team as a walk-on. "I ran the 100 in 9.9 seconds, which was pretty fair for that time, and I had a good change of pace" recalled Nalley.

== See also ==
- List of NCAA major college yearly punt and kickoff return leaders
