= T. Ray Richeson =

American football coach (1923–2003)

Ray Richeson
No. 32
- Position: Guard

Personal information
- Born: September 27, 1923; Russellville, Alabama, U.S.
- Died: April 1, 2003 (aged 79); Birmingham, Alabama, U.S.
- Listed height: 6 ft 0 in (1.83 m)
- Listed weight: 235 lb (107 kg)

Career information
- College: Alabama (1946–1948)
- NFL draft: 1948: 10th round, 84th overall pick

Career history

Playing
- Chicago Hornets (1949)

Coaching
- Meridian (1952) Head coach; Livingston State (1953–1956) Head coach

Career AAFC statistics
- Games played: 12
- Games started: 1
- Stats at Pro Football Reference

Head coaching record
- Regular season: 4–31–1 (.125)

Thomas Ray Richeson (September 27, 1923 – April 1, 2003) was an American football player, head coach and businessman. He was born and raised in Russellville, Alabama before he served in the United States Army Air Forces during World War II. After his service, he earned a degree from the University of Alabama where he also played on the football team from 1946 through 1948 when he was a team captain. After he graduated, Richeson was taken in the tenth round of the 1948 NFL draft by the Philadelphia Eagles, but ultimately played the 1949 season with the Chicago Hornets.

Following his playing career, Richeson began his coaching career. After one season at Meridian Junior College, he was hired as the head coach at Livingston State College (now the University of West Alabama). From 1953 through the 1956 season he compiled an overall record of four wins, 31 losses and one tie during his tenure there (4–31–1). Following his tenure at Livingston, Richeson ended his coaching career and entered the private sector through his retirement in 1988.

== Head coaching record ==
Year	Team	Overall	Conference	Standing	Bowl/playoffs
Livingston State Tigers (Alabama Intercollegiate Conference) (1953–1956)
1953	Livingston State	2–7			
1954	Livingston State	0–10			
1955	Livingston State	1–7			
1956	Livingston State	1–7–1			
Livingston State:		4–31–1			
Total:		4–31–1			
