= 1948 Kentucky Wildcats football team =

American college football season

1948 Kentucky Wildcats football
- Conference: Southeastern Conference
- Record: 5–3–2 (1–3–1 SEC)
- Head coach: Bear Bryant (3rd season)
- Captain: George Blanda
- Home stadium: McLean Stadium

1948 Southeastern Conference football standings
	Conf.					Overall
Team	W		L		T	W		L		T
No. 8 Georgia $	6	–	0	–	0	9	–	2	–	0
No. 15 Ole Miss	6	–	1	–	0	8	–	1	–	0
No. 13 Tulane	5	–	1	–	0	9	–	1	–	0
No. 12 Vanderbilt	4	–	2	–	1	8	–	2	–	1
Georgia Tech	4	–	3	–	0	7	–	3	–	0
Alabama	4	–	4	–	1	6	–	4	–	1
Mississippi State	3	–	3	–	0	4	–	4	–	1
Tennessee	2	–	3	–	1	4	–	4	–	2
Kentucky	1	–	3	–	1	5	–	3	–	2
Florida	1	–	5	–	0	5	–	5	–	0
LSU	1	–	5	–	0	3	–	7	–	0
Auburn	0	–	7	–	0	1	–	8	–	1
$ – Conference champion; Rankings from AP Poll

The 1948 Kentucky Wildcats football team was an American football team that represented the University of Kentucky as a member of the Southeastern Conference (SEC) during the 1948 college football season. In their third year under head coach Bear Bryant, the Wildcats compiled an overall record of 5–3–2, with a conference record of 1–3–1, and finished ninth in the SEC.

Kentucky was ranked at No. 30 in the final Litkenhous Difference by Score System ratings for 1948.

== Schedule ==
Date	Opponent	Site	Result	Attendance	Source
September 25	Xavier*	McLean Stadium; Lexington, KY	W 48–7		
October 2	Ole Miss	McLean Stadium; Lexington, KY	L 7–20	30,000	
October 9	at Georgia	Sanford Stadium; Athens, GA	L 12–35	23,000	
October 16	Vanderbilt	McLean Stadium; Lexington, KY (rivalry)	L 7–26	25,000	
October 23	at Marquette*	Marquette Stadium; Milwaukee, WI	W 25–0	15,000	
October 30	at Cincinnati*	Nippert Stadium; Cincinnati, OH	W 28–7	24,000	
November 6	Villanova*	McLean Stadium; Lexington, KY	T 13–13	22,000	
November 13	Florida	McLean Stadium; Lexington, KY (rivalry)	W 34–15	22,000	
November 20	at Tennessee	Shields–Watkins Field; Knoxville, TN (rivalry)	T 0–0	35,000	
November 26	at Miami (FL)*	Burdine Stadium; Miami, FL	W 25–5	30,361	
*Non-conference game
