= 1948 Penn Quakers football team =

American college football season

1948 Penn Quakers football
- Conference: Independent
- Record: 5–3
- Head coach: George Munger (11th season)
- Home stadium: Franklin Field

1948 Ivy Group football standings
| | Conf. | | | | | Overall |
| Team | W | | L | | T | W | | L | | T |
|---|---|---|---|---|---|---|---|---|---|---|
| No. 19 Cornell | 4 | – | 0 | – | 0 | 8 | – | 1 | – | 0 |
| Penn | 3 | – | 1 | – | 0 | 5 | – | 3 | – | 0 |
| Dartmouth | 4 | – | 2 | – | 0 | 6 | – | 2 | – | 0 |
| Brown | 1 | – | 2 | – | 0 | 7 | – | 2 | – | 0 |
| Princeton | 3 | – | 3 | – | 0 | 4 | – | 4 | – | 0 |
| Harvard | 3 | – | 3 | – | 0 | 4 | – | 4 | – | 0 |
| Yale | 1 | – | 4 | – | 0 | 4 | – | 5 | – | 0 |
| Columbia | 1 | – | 5 | – | 0 | 4 | – | 5 | – | 0 |
Rankings from AP Poll

The 1948 Penn Quakers football team was an American football team that represented the University of Pennsylvania as an independent during the 1948 college football season.

In its eleventh season under head coach George Munger, the team compiled a 5–3 record and outscored opponents 169 to 117.

Penn won its first five games and was seventh in the AP poll, but lost the last three games, all at home, and fell out of the rankings. Center and linebacker Chuck Bednarik, a consensus All-American, was third in the balloting for the Heisman Trophy.

Penn was ranked at No. 22 in the final Litkenhous Difference by Score System ratings for 1948.

Home games were played on campus at Franklin Field in Philadelphia.

== Schedule ==
| Date | Opponent | Rank | Site | Result | Attendance | Source |
|---|---|---|---|---|---|---|
| October 2 | Dartmouth | | Franklin Field; Philadelphia, PA | W 26–13 | 60,000 | |
| October 9 | Princeton | No. 12 | Franklin Field; Philadelphia, PA (rivalry) | W 29–7 | 60,000 | |
| October 16 | at Columbia | No. 8 | Baker Field; New York, NY | W 20–14 | 35,000 | |
| October 23 | Navy | No. 7 | Franklin Field; Philadelphia, PA | W 20–14 | 75,000 | |
| October 30 | Washington and Lee | No. 7 | Franklin Field; Philadelphia, PA | W 40–7 | 50,000 | |
| November 6 | No. 14 Penn State | No. 7 | Franklin Field; Philadelphia, PA | L 0–13 | 78,205 | |
| November 13 | No. 3 Army | No. 17 | Franklin Field; Philadelphia, PA | L 20–26 | 78,205 | |
| November 25 | Cornell | No. 19 | Franklin Field; Philadelphia, PA (rivalry) | L 14–23 | 78,000 | |
Rankings from AP Poll released prior to the game

== Rankings ==
Ranking movements Legend: ██ Increase in ranking ██ Decrease in ranking — = Not ranked ( ) = First-place votes
| | Week | | | | | | | | |
| Poll | 1 | 2 | 3 | 4 | 5 | 6 | 7 | 8 | Final |
|---|---|---|---|---|---|---|---|---|---|
| AP | 12 | 8 (7) | 7 | 7 | 7 | 17 | 16 | 19 | — |
