= 1948 Miami Hurricanes football team =

American college football season

1948 Miami Hurricanes football
- Conference: Independent
- Record: 4–6
- Head coach: Andy Gustafson (1st season)
- Home stadium: Burdine Stadium

1948 Southern major college football independents records
	Conf.			Overall
Team	W	L	T	W		L		T
West Virginia		–		9	–	3	–	0
Virginia		–		5	–	3	–	1
Chattanooga		–		4	–	5	–	0
Georgetown		–		3	–	4	–	1
Miami (FL)		–		4	–	6	–	0
Navy		–		0	–	8	–	1

The 1948 Miami Hurricanes football team represented the University of Miami as an independent during the 1948 college football season. Led by first-year head coach Andy Gustafson, the Hurricanes played their home games at Burdine Stadium in Miami, Florida. Miami finished the season 4–6.

Miami was ranked at No. 65 in the final Litkenhous Difference by Score System ratings for 1948.

== Schedule ==
Date	Opponent	Site	Result	Attendance	Source
October 1	Rollins	Burdine Stadium; Miami, FL	W 25–0	34,557	
October 8	Villanova	Burdine Stadium; Miami, FL	L 10–19	42,847	
October 15	at Detroit	University of Detroit Stadium; Detroit, MI	W 6–0	18,451	
October 22	Georgia	Burdine Stadium; Miami, FL	L 21–42	46,127	
October 29	Maryland	Burdine Stadium; Miami, FL	L 13–27	33,304	
November 5	Cincinnati	Burdine Stadium; Miami, FL	W 36–6	31,561	
November 12	Chattanooga	Burdine Stadium; Miami, FL	W 19–0	28,548	
November 20	at Florida	Florida Field; Gainesville, FL (rivalry)	L 13–27	27,000	
November 26	Kentucky	Burdine Stadium; Miami, FL	L 5–25	30,361	
December 3	No. 12 Vanderbilt	Burdine Stadium; Miami, FL	L 6–33	28,952	
Rankings from AP Poll released prior to the game
