= Peterson, Alabama =

- Unincorporated community
- Location within Alabama Location within the United States
- Coordinates: 33°13′57″N 87°25′25″W
- Country: United States
- State: Alabama
- County: Tuscaloosa
- Elevation: 417 ft (127 m)
- Time zone: UTC-6 (Central (CST))
  - Summer (DST): UTC-5 (CDT)
- ZIP code: 35478
- Area codes: 205, 659
- GNIS feature ID: 152878

Peterson is an unincorporated community in Tuscaloosa County, Alabama, United States. Peterson is located on Alabama State Route 216, 8.6 miles (13.8 km) east-northeast of Tuscaloosa. Peterson has a post office with ZIP code 35478. Peterson was originally known as Peterson City, in honor of Charles M. Peterson, who purchased land in the surrounding area.
