= 1948 Mississippi State Maroons football team =

American college football season

1948 Mississippi State Maroons football
- Conference: Southeastern Conference
- Record: 4–4–1 (3–3 SEC)
- Head coach: Allyn McKeen (9th season)
- Home stadium: Scott Field

1948 Southeastern Conference football standings
	Conf.					Overall
Team	W		L		T	W		L		T
No. 8 Georgia $	6	–	0	–	0	9	–	2	–	0
No. 15 Ole Miss	6	–	1	–	0	8	–	1	–	0
No. 13 Tulane	5	–	1	–	0	9	–	1	–	0
No. 12 Vanderbilt	4	–	2	–	1	8	–	2	–	1
Georgia Tech	4	–	3	–	0	7	–	3	–	0
Alabama	4	–	4	–	1	6	–	4	–	1
Mississippi State	3	–	3	–	0	4	–	4	–	1
Tennessee	2	–	3	–	1	4	–	4	–	2
Kentucky	1	–	3	–	1	5	–	3	–	2
Florida	1	–	5	–	0	5	–	5	–	0
LSU	1	–	5	–	0	3	–	7	–	0
Auburn	0	–	7	–	0	1	–	8	–	1
$ – Conference champion; Rankings from AP Poll

The 1948 Mississippi State Maroons football team represented Mississippi State College during the 1948 college football season. This was the only of head coach Allyn McKeen's nine seasons that did not end in a winning record for the Maroons. Despite the strong record—his .764 (65–19–3) winning percentage is the best in school history—McKeen was fired after the season. The Maroons, who had won seven or more games in six of McKeen's nine seasons, did not post another seven-win season until 1963.

Mississippi State was ranked at No. 43 in the final Litkenhous Difference by Score System ratings for 1948.

== Schedule ==
Date	Opponent	Site	Result	Attendance	Source
September 25	at Tennessee	Shields–Watkins Field; Knoxville, TN	W 21–6	35,000	
October 2	Baylor*	Crump Stadium; Memphis, TN	T 7–7	23,802	
October 9	Clemson*	Scott Field; Starkville, MS	L 7–21	12,000	
October 16	Cincinnati*	Scott Field; Starkville, MS	W 27–0	10,000	
October 23	Alabama	Scott Field; Starkville, MS (rivalry)	L 7–10	24,000	
October 30	at No. 19 Tulane	Tulane Stadium; New Orleans, LA	L 0–9	45,000	
November 6	at Auburn	Legion Field; Birmingham, AL	W 20–0	15,000	
November 13	at LSU	Tiger Stadium; Baton Rouge, LA (rivalry)	W 7–0	30,000	
November 27	at No. 16 Ole Miss	Hemingway Stadium; Oxford, MS (Egg Bowl)	L 7–34	26,000	
*Non-conference game; Rankings from AP Poll released prior to the game
