= 1948 Georgia Tech Yellow Jackets football team =

American college football season

1948 Georgia Tech Yellow Jackets football
- Conference: Southeastern Conference
- Record: 7–3 (4–3 SEC)
- Head coach: Bobby Dodd (4th season)
- Captains: George Brodnax; Jim Castleberry
- Home stadium: Grant Field

1948 Southeastern Conference football standings
	Conf.					Overall
Team	W		L		T	W		L		T
No. 8 Georgia $	6	–	0	–	0	9	–	2	–	0
No. 15 Ole Miss	6	–	1	–	0	8	–	1	–	0
No. 13 Tulane	5	–	1	–	0	9	–	1	–	0
No. 12 Vanderbilt	4	–	2	–	1	8	–	2	–	1
Georgia Tech	4	–	3	–	0	7	–	3	–	0
Alabama	4	–	4	–	1	6	–	4	–	1
Mississippi State	3	–	3	–	0	4	–	4	–	1
Tennessee	2	–	3	–	1	4	–	4	–	2
Kentucky	1	–	3	–	1	5	–	3	–	2
Florida	1	–	5	–	0	5	–	5	–	0
LSU	1	–	5	–	0	3	–	7	–	0
Auburn	0	–	7	–	0	1	–	8	–	1
$ – Conference champion; Rankings from AP Poll

The 1948 Georgia Tech Yellow Jackets football team was an American football team that represented Georgia Tech as a member of the Southeastern Conference (SEC) during the 1948 college football season. In their fourth year under head coach Bobby Dodd, the Yellow Jackets compiled an overall record of 7–3, with a conference record of 4–3, and finished fifth in the SEC.

Clay Matthews Sr. and Frank Ziegler were on this team.

Though unranked in the final AP Poll, Georgia Tech was ranked at No. 16 in the final Litkenhous Difference by Score System ratings for 1948.

== Schedule ==
Date	Opponent	Rank	Site	Result	Attendance	Source
September 25	at Vanderbilt		Dudley Field; Nashville, TN (rivalry)	W 13–0	22,000	
October 2	Tulane		Grant Field; Atlanta, GA	W 13–7	35,000	
October 9	Washington and Lee*	No. 6	Grant Field; Atlanta, GA	W 27–0	25,000	
October 16	Auburn	No. 7	Grant Field; Atlanta, GA (rivalry)	W 27–0	38,000	
October 23	Florida	No. 6	Grant Field; Atlanta, GA	W 42–7	28,000	
October 30	at Duke*	No. 6	Duke Stadium; Durham, NC	W 19–7	32,000	
November 6	Tennessee	No. 6	Grant Field; Atlanta, GA (rivalry)	L 6–13	38,000	
November 13	Alabama	No. 11	Grant Field; Atlanta, GA (rivalry)	L 12–14	40,000	
November 20	The Citadel*	No. 20	Grant Field; Atlanta, GA	W 54–0	15,000	
November 27	at No. 12 Georgia		Sanford Stadium; Athens, GA (rivalry)	L 13–21	52,000	
*Non-conference game; Rankings from AP Poll released prior to the game

== Rankings ==
Ranking movements Legend: ██ Increase in ranking ██ Decrease in ranking — = Not ranked ( ) = First-place votes
	Week								
Poll	1	2	3	4	5	6	7	8	Final
AP	6	7	6	6 (1)	6 (7)	11	20	—	—
