= 1948 Columbia Lions football team =

American college football season

1948 Columbia Lions football
- Conference: Independent
- Record: 4–5
- Head coach: Lou Little (19th season)
- Home stadium: Baker Field

1948 Ivy Group football standings
	Conf.					Overall
Team	W		L		T	W		L		T
No. 19 Cornell	4	–	0	–	0	8	–	1	–	0
Penn	3	–	1	–	0	5	–	3	–	0
Dartmouth	4	–	2	–	0	6	–	2	–	0
Brown	1	–	2	–	0	7	–	2	–	0
Princeton	3	–	3	–	0	4	–	4	–	0
Harvard	3	–	3	–	0	4	–	4	–	0
Yale	1	–	4	–	0	4	–	5	–	0
Columbia	1	–	5	–	0	4	–	5	–	0
Rankings from AP Poll

The 1948 Columbia Lions football team was an American football team that represented Columbia University as an independent during the 1948 college football season.

In their 19th season under head coach Lou Little, the Lions compiled a 4–5 record, but outscored their opponents 194 to 177. Team captains were chosen on a game-by-game basis, and included, in schedule order, Gene Shekitka, Henry Briggs, Charles Klemovich, Lou Kusserow, Gene Rossides, John Nork, Joe Jaras, Bill Olson and Clyde Hampton.

Columbia was ranked at No. 49 in the final Litkenhous Difference by Score System ratings for 1948.

Columbia played its home games at Baker Field in Upper Manhattan, in New York City.

== Schedule ==
Date	Opponent	Site	Result	Attendance	Source
September 25	Rutgers	Baker Field; New York, NY	W 27–6	28,000	
October 2	at Harvard	Harvard Stadium; Boston, MA	L 24–33	20,000	
October 9	at Yale	Yale Bowl; New Haven, CT	W 34–28	55,000	
October 16	No. 8 Penn^{†}	Baker Field; New York, NY	L 14–20	35,000	
October 23	Princeton	Baker Field; New York, NY	L 14–16	30,000	
October 30	Cornell	Baker Field; New York, NY (rivalry)	L 13–20	35,000	
November 6	at Dartmouth	Memorial Field; Hanover, NH	L 21–26	16,000	
November 13	Navy	Baker Field; New York, NY	W 13–0	35,000	
November 20	Syracuse	Baker Field; New York, NY	W 34–28	20,000	
^{†}Homecoming; Rankings from AP Poll released prior to the game
