= 1948 Ole Miss Rebels football team =

American college football season

1948 Ole Miss Rebels football
- Conference: Southeastern Conference

Ranking
- AP: No. 15
- Record: 8–1 (6–1 SEC)
- Head coach: Johnny Vaught (2nd season)
- Captain: Doug Hamley
- Home stadium: Hemingway Stadium

1948 Southeastern Conference football standings
	Conf.					Overall
Team	W		L		T	W		L		T
No. 8 Georgia $	6	–	0	–	0	9	–	2	–	0
No. 15 Ole Miss	6	–	1	–	0	8	–	1	–	0
No. 13 Tulane	5	–	1	–	0	9	–	1	–	0
No. 12 Vanderbilt	4	–	2	–	1	8	–	2	–	1
Georgia Tech	4	–	3	–	0	7	–	3	–	0
Alabama	4	–	4	–	1	6	–	4	–	1
Mississippi State	3	–	3	–	0	4	–	4	–	1
Tennessee	2	–	3	–	1	4	–	4	–	2
Kentucky	1	–	3	–	1	5	–	3	–	2
Florida	1	–	5	–	0	5	–	5	–	0
LSU	1	–	5	–	0	3	–	7	–	0
Auburn	0	–	7	–	0	1	–	8	–	1
$ – Conference champion; Rankings from AP Poll

The 1948 Ole Miss Rebels football team represented the University of Mississippi during the 1948 college football season. The Rebels were led by second-year head coach Johnny Vaught and played their home games at Hemingway Stadium in Oxford, Mississippi. Ole Miss finished with just one loss, to rival Tulane, to place second in the Southeastern Conference and 15th in the final AP Poll. They were not invited to a bowl game.

== Schedule ==
Date	Opponent	Rank	Site	Result	Attendance	Source
September 25	at Florida		Florida Field; Gainesville, FL	W 14–0	24,000	
October 2	at Kentucky		McLean Stadium; Lexington, KY	W 20–7	30,000	
October 9	Vanderbilt^{†}	No. 13	Hemingway Stadium; Oxford, MS (rivalry)	W 20–7	22,500	
October 16	at Tulane	No. 10	Tulane Stadium; New Orleans, LA (rivalry)	L 7–20	43,000	
October 23	Boston College*	No. 20	Crump Stadium; Memphis, TN	W 32–13	23,000	
October 30	at LSU		Tiger Stadium; Baton Rouge, LA (rivalry)	W 49–19	40,000	
November 6	at Chattanooga*		Chamberlain Field; Chattanooga, TN	W 34–7	7,500	
November 13	vs. No. 18 Tennessee		Crump Stadium; Memphis, TN (rivalry)	W 16–13	31,000	
November 27	Mississippi State	No. 16	Hemingway Stadium; Oxford, MS (Egg Bowl)	W 34–7	26,000	
*Non-conference game; ^{†}Homecoming; Rankings from AP Poll released prior to the game

== Rankings ==
Ranking movements Legend: ██ Increase in ranking ██ Decrease in ranking — = Not ranked т = Tied with team above or below ( ) = First-place votes
	Week								
Poll	1	2	3	4	5	6	7	8	Final
AP	13т	10	20	—	—	—	17	16	15 (13)

== Roster ==
- E Barney Poole
- E Jackie Poole
- G Phillip Poole, Sr.
- Robert E. "Bob" Joiner
