= 1948 LSU Tigers football team =

American college football season

1948 LSU Tigers football
- Conference: Southeastern Conference
- Record: 3–7 (1–5 SEC)
- Head coach: Gaynell Tinsley (1st season)
- Home stadium: Tiger Stadium

1948 Southeastern Conference football standings
	Conf.					Overall
Team	W		L		T	W		L		T
No. 8 Georgia $	6	–	0	–	0	9	–	2	–	0
No. 15 Ole Miss	6	–	1	–	0	8	–	1	–	0
No. 13 Tulane	5	–	1	–	0	9	–	1	–	0
No. 12 Vanderbilt	4	–	2	–	1	8	–	2	–	1
Georgia Tech	4	–	3	–	0	7	–	3	–	0
Alabama	4	–	4	–	1	6	–	4	–	1
Mississippi State	3	–	3	–	0	4	–	4	–	1
Tennessee	2	–	3	–	1	4	–	4	–	2
Kentucky	1	–	3	–	1	5	–	3	–	2
Florida	1	–	5	–	0	5	–	5	–	0
LSU	1	–	5	–	0	3	–	7	–	0
Auburn	0	–	7	–	0	1	–	8	–	1
$ – Conference champion; Rankings from AP Poll

The 1948 LSU Tigers football team was an American football team that represented Louisiana State University (LSU) as a member of the Southeastern Conference (SEC) during the 1948 college football season. In their first year under head coach Gaynell Tinsley, the Tigers compiled an overall record of 3–7, with a conference record of 1–5, and finished 11th in the SEC.

LSU was ranked at No. 74 in the final Litkenhous Difference by Score System ratings for 1948.

== Schedule ==
Date	Opponent	Site	Result	Attendance	Source
September 18	at Texas*	Memorial Stadium; Austin, TX	L 0–33	47,500	
October 2	at Rice*	Rice Field; Houston, TX	W 26–13	29,000	
October 9	Texas A&M*	Tiger Stadium; Baton Rouge, LA (rivalry)	W 14–13	35,000	
October 16	No. 16 Georgia	Tiger Stadium; Baton Rouge, LA	L 0–22	36,000–37,000	
October 23	at No. 3 North Carolina	Kenan Memorial Stadium; Chapel Hill, NC	L 7–34	40,000–41,000	
October 30	Ole Miss^{†}	Tiger Stadium; Baton Rouge, LA (rivalry)	L 19–49	40,000–45,000	
November 6	at Vanderbilt	Dudley Field; Nashville, TN	L 7–48	21,000–22,000	
November 13	Mississippi State	Tiger Stadium; Baton Rouge, LA (rivalry)	L 0–7	30,000	
November 20	Alabama	Tiger Stadium; Baton Rouge, LA (rivalry)	W 26–6	25,000–27,000	
November 27	No. 14 Tulane	Tiger Stadium; Baton Rouge, LA (Battle for the Rag)	L 0–46	45,000–46,000	
*Non-conference game; ^{†}Homecoming; Rankings from AP Poll released prior to the game
