= 1949 Sugar Bowl =

American college football game

- 15th Sugar Bowl
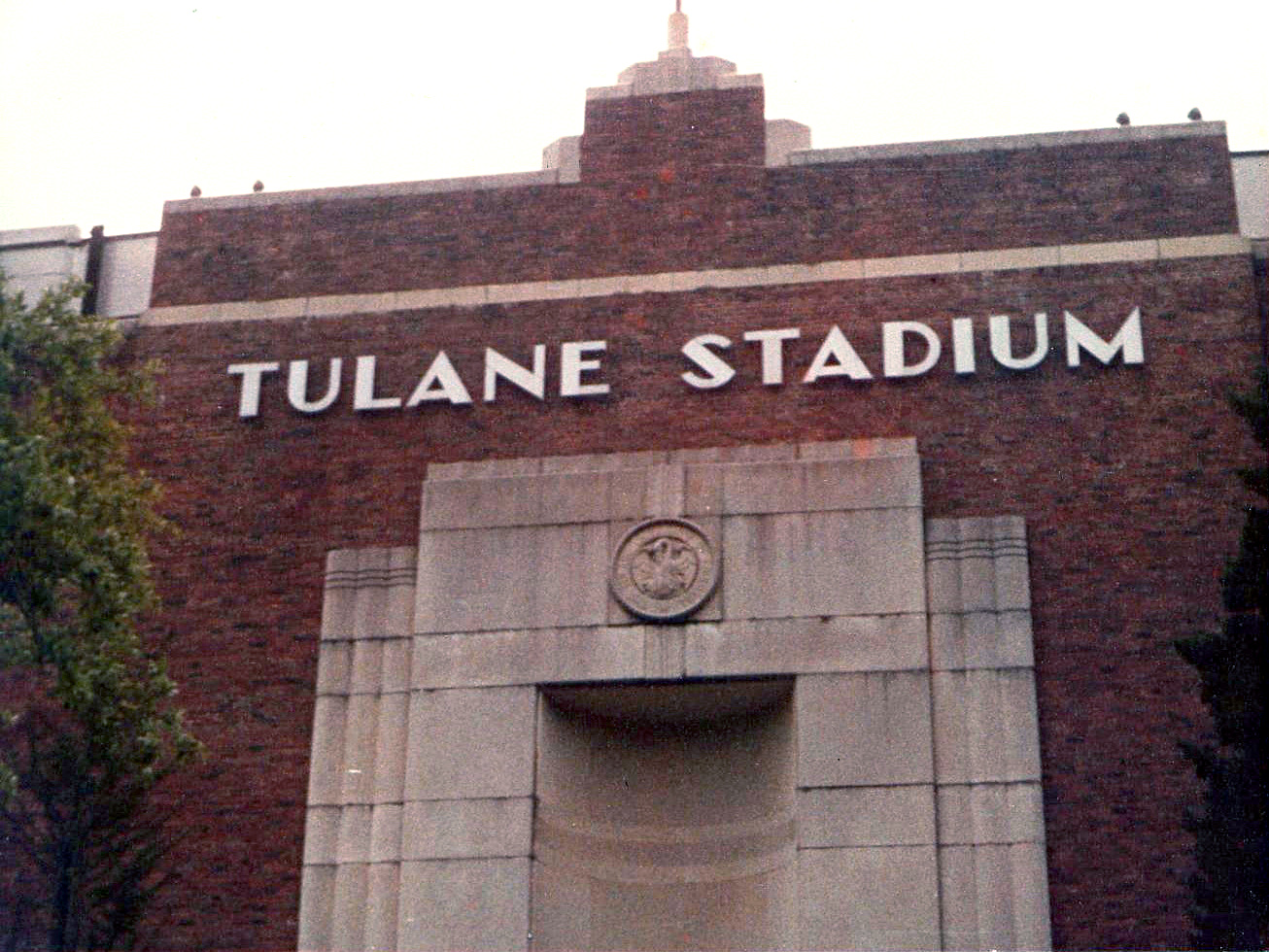
- Tulane Stadium in New Orleans, Louisiana, hosted the Sugar Bowl.
Oklahoma Sooners	North Carolina Tar Heels
(10–1)	(9–1–1)
Big 6	SoCon
14	6
Head coach: Bud Wilkinson	Head coach: Carl Snavely
AP 5	AP 3
	1	2	3	4	Total
Oklahoma	7	0	7	0	14
North Carolina	6	0	0	0	6
- Date: January 1, 1949
- Season: 1948
- Stadium: Tulane Stadium
- Location: New Orleans, Louisiana
- Referee: J.D. Rogers (Southern; split crew: Southern, Big Six)

The 1949 Sugar Bowl was the 15th edition of the college football bowl game, played at Tulane Stadium in New Orleans, Louisiana, on Saturday, January 1. Part of the 1948–49 bowl season, it matched the fifth-ranked Oklahoma Sooners of the Big Six Conference (later known as the now defunct Big Eight Conference) and the third-ranked North Carolina Tar Heels of the Southern Conference (SoCon). Oklahoma would win the bowl 14-6 in an upset victory in front of a record crowd of 80,383 attendees.

== Background ==
Three days before the game, North Carolina's star halfback Charlie "Choo Choo" Justice came down with a virus, weakening him to the point that the only meal he could eat was a small pre-game steak. Justice's health would prove a vital factor in the game, as his performance would diminish as the contest progressed.

== Game summary ==
The Justice-led Tar Heels seemed dominant early in the contest, eventually finding themselves on Oklahoma's 7-yard line. Taking a snap in the single-wing formation, Justice stumbled and tried to force a pass in the flat, resulting in an interception at the hands of Sooner linebacker Myrle Greathouse. “I made the mistake of throwing off-balance,” Justice later recounted. “He was in the right place at the right time.”

Greathouse continued on for 69 yards, eventually being tackled by Eddie Knox at the UNC 14. After a sequence of eight plays, Oklahoma quarterback Jack Mitchell scored from the 1-yard line, giving the Sooners the first points of the game. However, after a OU fumble and turnover, the Tar Heels ran a double reverse which resulted in halfback Bob Kennedy downing the ball at the OU 3. Hosea Rodgers ran the ball in for a touchdown, but kicker Bobby Cox missed the PAT. At the end of the first quarter, the score stood 7-6 Oklahoma.

In the second quarter, the Tar Heels found themselves on Oklahoma's 8-yard line shortly before halftime. Justice, however, would throw overthrow a pass in the end zone, ending the second quarter without a score for either team. The Tar Heels would go on to struggle to make it past their half of the field until the final stages of the contest.

In the third period, Sooner Darrell Royal underthrew a pass to end Frankie Anderson on a trick play. However, the pass was deflected into Anderson's hands by defender Dick Bunting at the 10-yard line. Halfback Lindell Pearson completed the drive, scoring on an 8-yard run. Oklahoma, enjoying a 14-6 lead, would focus on defense and ball control for the remainder of the game, and would go on to win the bowl after a scoreless fourth quarter.

=== Scoring ===
First quarter

- OU – Quarterback Jack Mitchell 1-yard run (PAT good)
- UNC – Hosea Rodgers 3-yard run (Cox PAT missed)

Second quarter

No scoring

Third quarter

- OU – Halfback Lindell Pearson 8-yard run (PAT good)

Fourth quarter

No scoring

== Statistics ==
Statistics	OU	UNC
First downs	15	12
Rushing yards	186	128
Passing	1–4–0	8–21–2
Passing yards	43	82
Total yards	229	210
Punts–avg.	5–36.8	7–38.0
Fumbles–lost	1–1	0–0
Turnovers	1	2
Penalty yards	40	30

== Aftermath ==
After the game, Justice largely blamed himself for North Carolina's loss. “I threw that one away,” he said, fighting back tears. “I gave them that first touchdown with that bad pass. They’ve got a great ball club. I lost it. You could say that.” The Tar Heels took their time showering and dressing after the game, letting the sting of their upset loss fade. Eventually, when the team left to board their buses back, they found an empty parking lot. The buses assigned to North Carolina had picked up the Sooners by mistake, leaving them stranded. Eventually, coach Carl Snavely waved down a truck which dropped the team off several blocks from a hotel.
