= Allegacy Federal Credit Union Stadium =

American football stadium in Winston-Salem, North Carolina

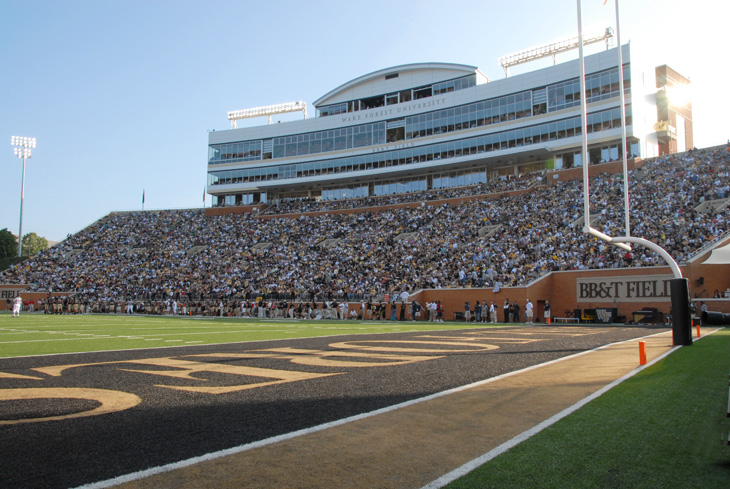
- The stadium during a Wake Forest vs. Ole Miss game, September 6, 2008

- Location in North Carolina Location in the United States
- Former names: Groves Stadium (1968–2007); BB&T Field (2007–20); Truist Field at Wake Forest (2020–23)
- Location: 411 Deacon Blvd, Winston-Salem, NC 27105
- Coordinates: 36°7′50″N 80°15′17″W
- Owner: Wake Forest University
- Operator: Wake Forest University
- Capacity: 31,500
- Surface: FieldTurf (2006–present); Natural grass (1968–2006)
- Record attendance: 37,623 (November 13, 2004)

Construction
- Groundbreaking: June 4, 1966
- Opened: September 14, 1968
- Renovated: 1996, 2005–2008, 2011
- Cost: $4 million ($37 million in 2025 dollars)
- Architects: Walter Robbs Callahan & Pierce (renovations)

Tenant
- Wake Forest Demon Deacons football (NCAA) (1968–present)

Website
- godeacs.com/truistfield

Allegacy Federal Credit Union Stadium is a football stadium in Winston-Salem, North Carolina. The stadium is just west of Gene Hooks Field at Wake Forest Baseball Park, home of the Wake Forest baseball team. It is primarily used for American football, and is the home field of the Wake Forest University Demon Deacons. The stadium opened in 1968 and holds 31,500 people. It is the smallest football stadium, by permanent capacity, in both the ACC and in all Power Four conferences. (Note: In both the 2022 and 2023 seasons, one Power Five stadium was smaller—respectively Oregon State's Reser Stadium (26,407) and Vanderbilt's FirstBank Stadium (28,500). However, both capacities were/are temporary. With renovation of Reser Stadium completed in 2023, its capacity is now 35,548. FirstBank Stadium is expected to have a capacity of about 34,000 when its ongoing renovation is completed in 2024.) Previously known as Groves Stadium, in September 2007, Wake Forest University and BB&T, which was headquartered in Winston-Salem, announced a 10-year deal to officially rename the stadium BB&T Field starting with the first 2007 home game against Nebraska. The deal was part of a larger development process to secure funds for stadium renovations and upgrades. On July 8, 2020, the name of the stadium was changed to Truist Field at Wake Forest following a merger between BB&T and SunTrust. On June 21, 2023, the stadium name was changed to Allegacy Federal Credit Union Stadium after Allegacy became an official banking partner with Wake Forest Athletics.

== History ==
The former stadium name of Groves Field goes back to the original stadium at the original location of Wake Forest (Wake Forest, North Carolina). The old stadium was financed by Henry Groves, and when the school announced the move to Winston-Salem, he and his brother, Earl, decided to make a further contribution to the school to keep their name on any new stadium. After moving to Winston-Salem, many games were played in Bowman Gray Stadium while the project to build a new stadium met with many setbacks. It was not until 1966 that the final fundraising was done, and the stadium opened in September 1968, with the Deacons losing to old rival NC State. The former Groves Stadium became the home football field for Wake Forest High School and is today known as Trentini Stadium. The stadium is part of a larger complex east of the main campus at the corner of Deacon Boulevard and University Parkway, which includes Gene Hooks Field at Wake Forest Baseball Park and Lawrence Joel Veterans Memorial Coliseum. The current stadium consists of two bowed grandstands on either side of the field. The southeast end zone is known as "Deacon Hill", and is used for berm seating during games. The Bridger Field House, originally built in 1968 with the stadium, was demolished in early 1996 and rebuilt during the 1996 football season. It opened midway through the 1997 football season. The structure is located behind the northwest end zone.

=== Renovations ===
In 2006, the Wake Forest Athletics Department announced plans to further the renovations on Truist Field (then Groves Stadium) with the construction of Deacon Tower which will house a new press box. Deacon Tower opened prior to the 2008 season. The press box is the centerpiece of the third of six levels of renovations set to take place at Truist Field. The old press box, built in 1968, was successfully imploded & demolished on the morning of January 14, 2007 as numerous Demon Deacon fans watched on. Previous renovations included the bricking of the facade of the grandstand in 2005 and the implementation of FieldTurf in 2006. In 2011, a new scoreboard was added, replacing the spot of the previous, smaller scoreboard at the top of Deacon Hill.

== Events ==
Notable events at Truist Field
Date	Artist	Event
August 11, 2017	Guns N' Roses	Not in This Lifetime... Tour
October 13, 2018	Billy Joel	Billy Joel in Concert
May 21, 2022	Paul McCartney	Got Back

== Gallery ==
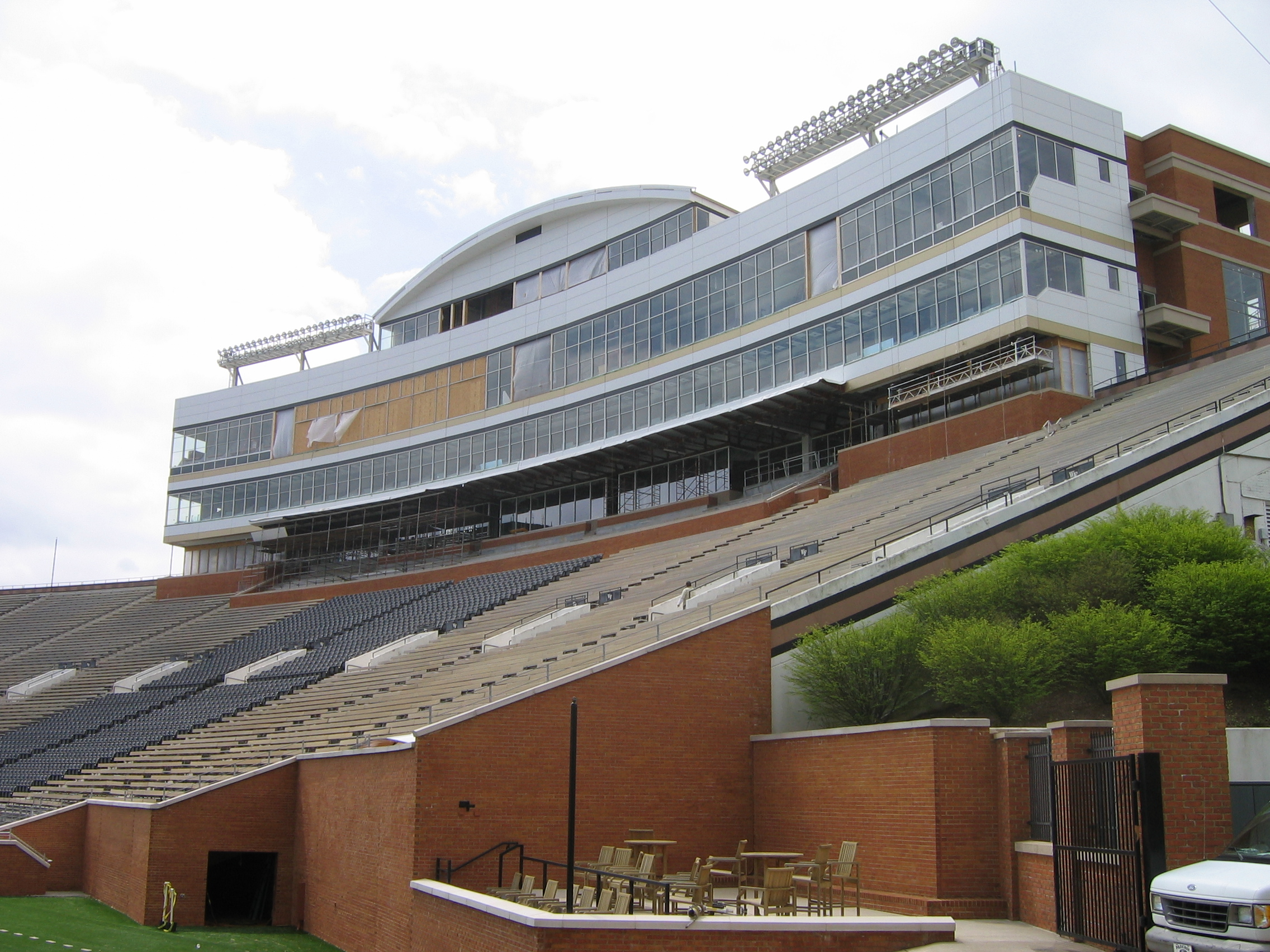
Picnic area

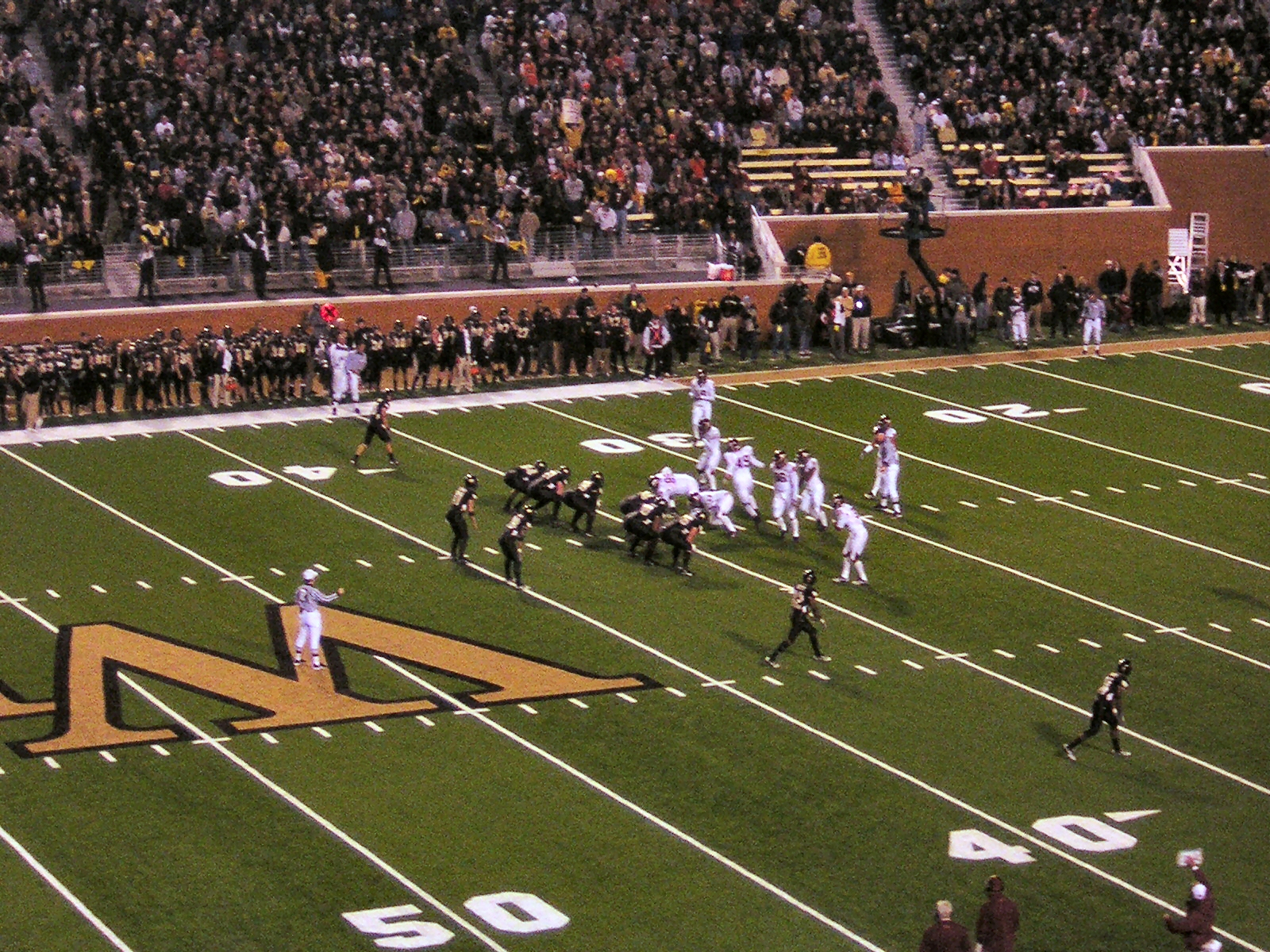
Wake Forest game, 2006

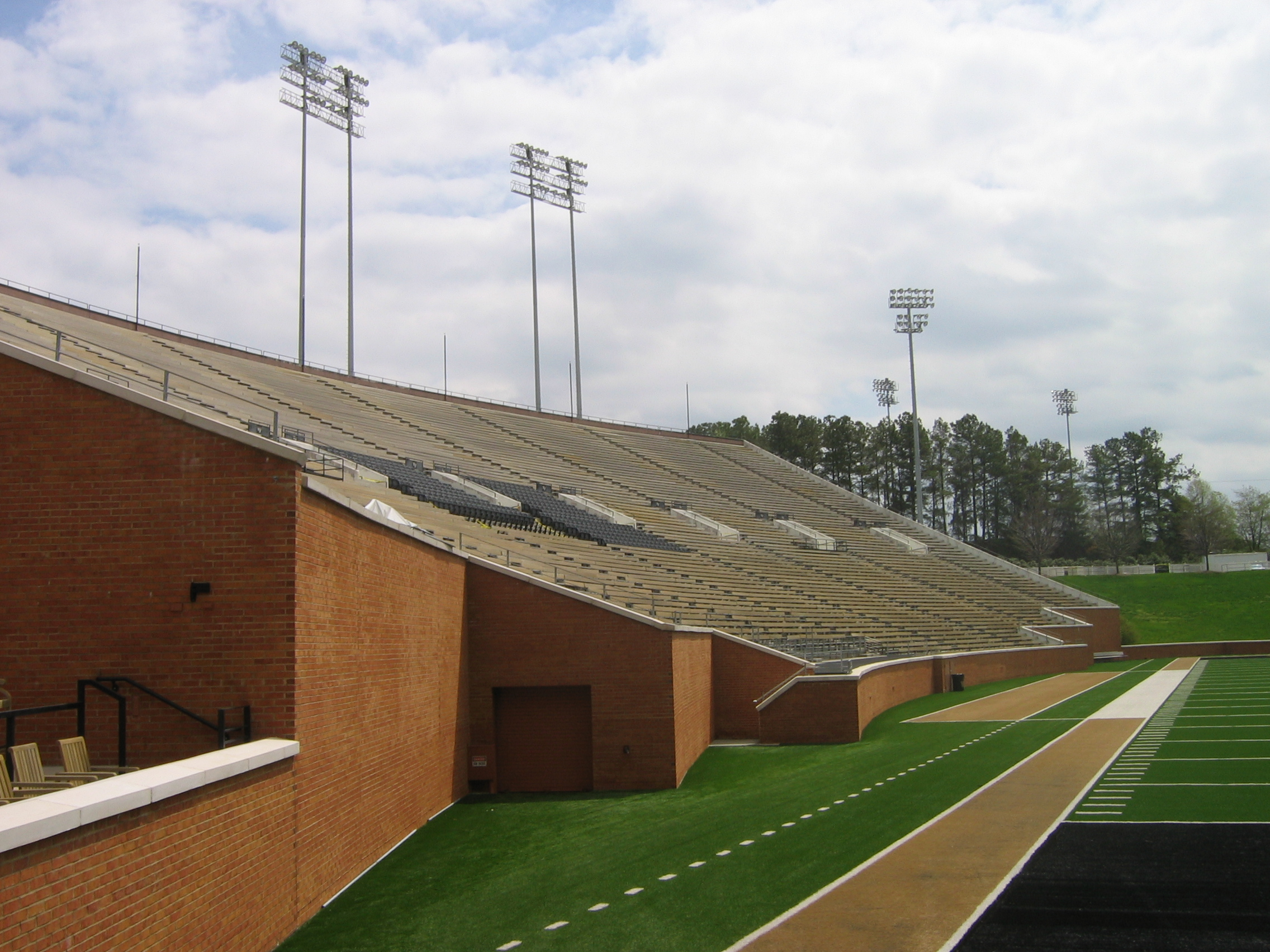
East sideline

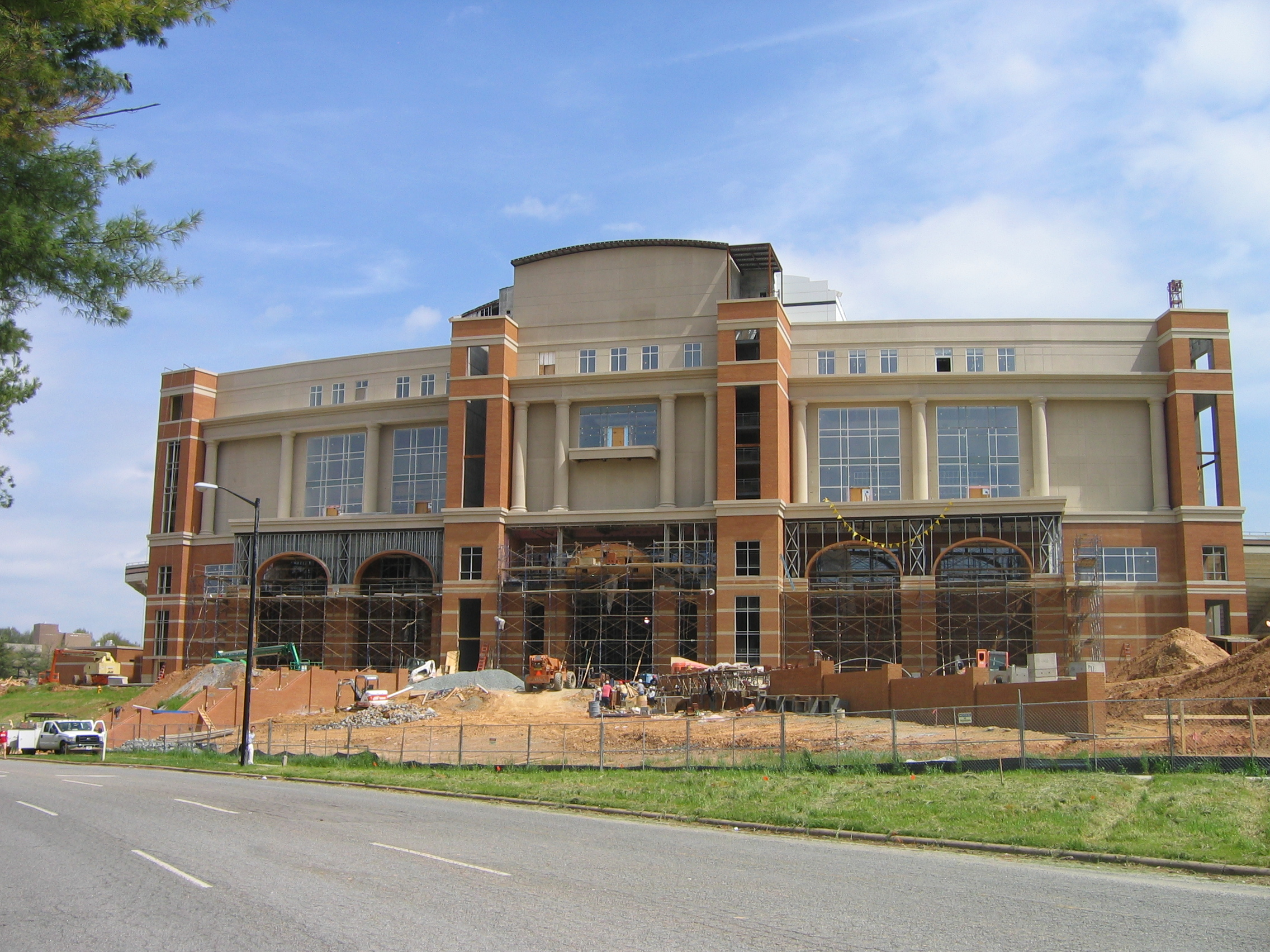
Exterior view

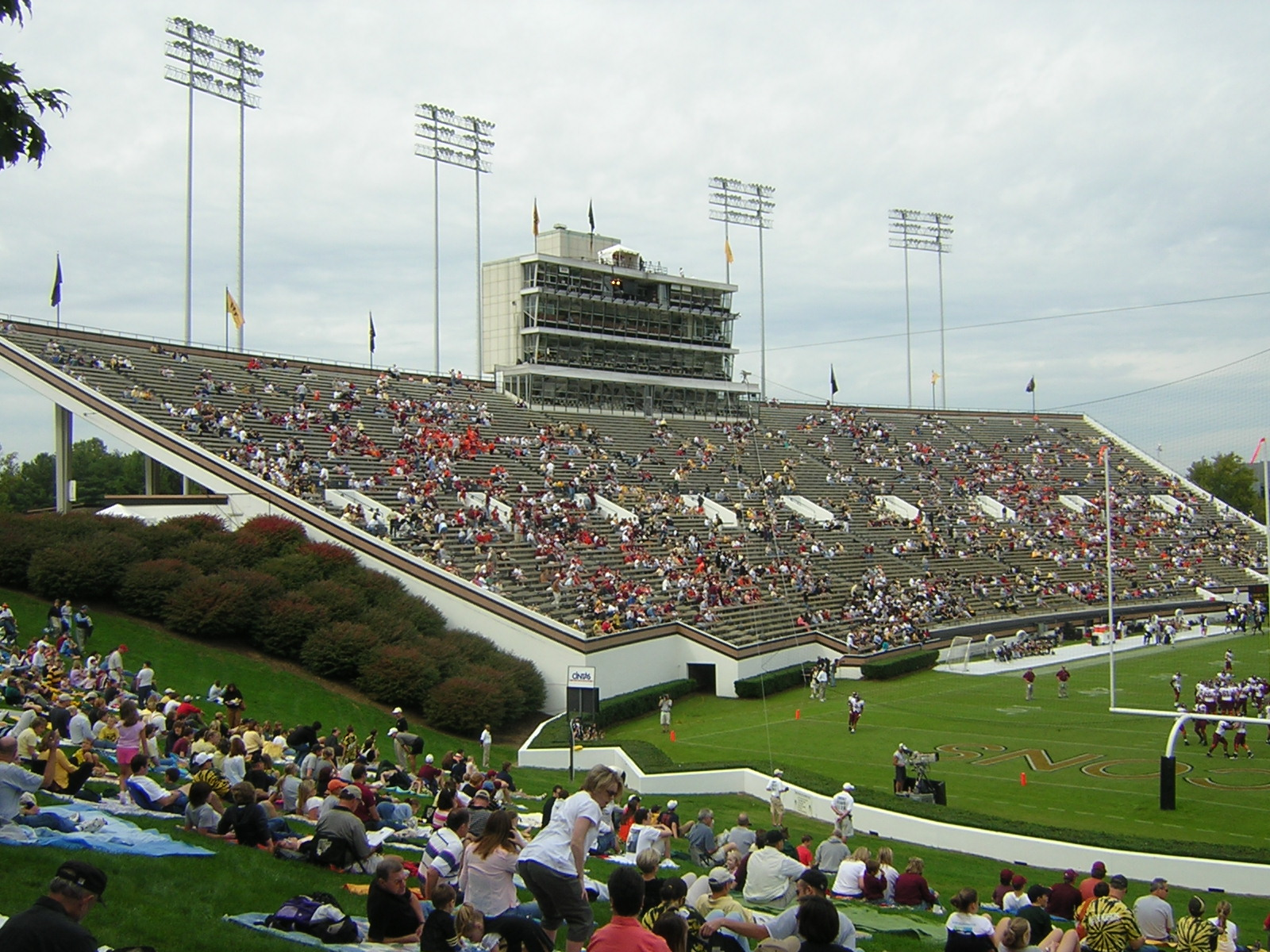
Lateral view, 2004

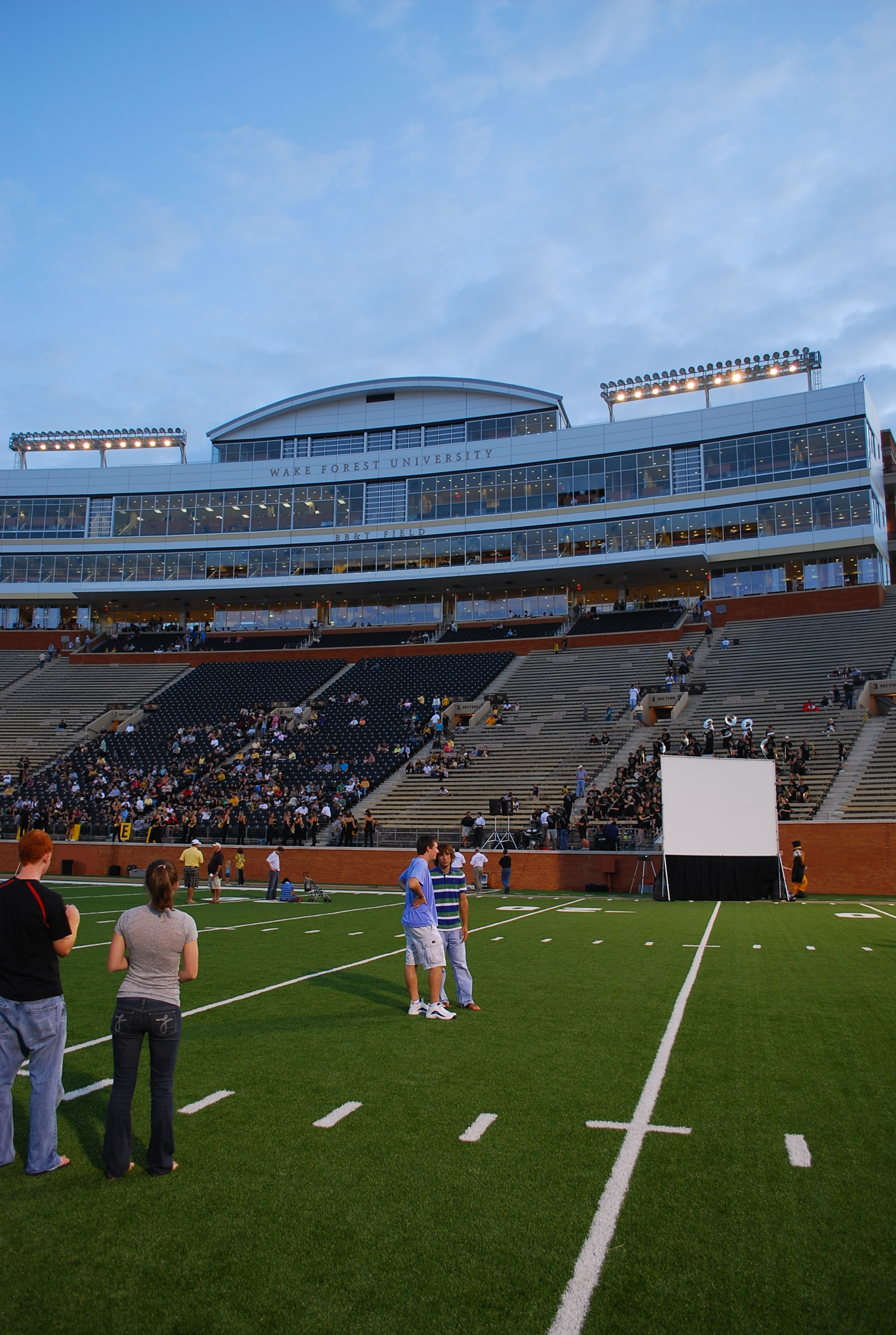
Press and luxury boxes

== See also ==
- List of NCAA Division I FBS football stadiums
