= 1948 NC State Wolfpack football team =

American college football season

1948 NC State Wolfpack football
- Conference: Southern Conference
- Record: 3–6–1 (1–4–1 SoCon)
- Head coach: Beattie Feathers (5th season)
- Home stadium: Riddick Stadium

1948 Southern Conference football standings
	Conf.					Overall
Team	W		L		T	W		L		T
No. 11 Clemson $	5	–	0	–	0	11	–	0	–	0
No. 3 North Carolina	4	–	0	–	1	9	–	1	–	1
VMI	5	–	1	–	0	6	–	3	–	0
No. 17 William & Mary	5	–	1	–	1	7	–	2	–	2
No. 20 Wake Forest	5	–	2	–	0	6	–	4	–	0
Maryland	4	–	2	–	0	6	–	4	–	0
Duke	3	–	2	–	1	4	–	3	–	2
Richmond	3	–	3	–	1	5	–	3	–	2
Washington and Lee	2	–	2	–	0	4	–	6	–	0
Furman	2	–	4	–	0	2	–	6	–	1
George Washington	2	–	4	–	0	4	–	6	–	0
Davidson	2	–	5	–	0	3	–	5	–	1
South Carolina	1	–	3	–	0	3	–	5	–	0
NC State	1	–	4	–	1	3	–	6	–	1
VPI	0	–	6	–	1	0	–	8	–	1
The Citadel	0	–	5	–	0	2	–	7	–	0
$ – Conference champion; Rankings from AP Poll

The 1948 NC State Wolfpack football team represented North Carolina State University during the 1948 college football season. The Wolfpack were led by fifth-year head coach Beattie Feathers and played their home games at Riddick Stadium in Raleigh, North Carolina. They competed as members of the Southern Conference.

NC State was ranked at No. 66 in the final Litkenhous Difference by Score System ratings for 1948.

== Schedule ==
Date	Opponent	Site	Result	Attendance	Source
September 25	Duke	Riddick Stadium; Raleigh, NC (rivalry)	T 0–0	20,000	
October 2	at Clemson	Memorial Stadium; Clemson, SC (rivalry)	L 0–6	20,500	
October 9	Davidson	Riddick Stadium; Raleigh, NC	W 40–0	17,500	
October 16	at No. 1 North Carolina	Kenan Memorial Stadium; Chapel Hill, NC (rivalry)	L 0–14	44,000	
October 23	at Chattanooga*	Chamberlain Field; Chattanooga, TN	W 7–0	5,000	
October 30	at Wake Forest	Groves Stadium; Wake Forest, NC (rivalry)	L 13–34	22,330	
November 6	Virginia*	Riddick Stadium; Raleigh, NC	L 14–21	15,000	
November 13	at Duquesne*	Forbes Field; Pittsburgh, PA	W 20–6	4,610	
November 20	at William & Mary	Cary Field; Williamsburg, VA	L 6–26	11,000	
November 27	Villanova*	Riddick Stadium; Raleigh, NC	L 7–21	8,500	
*Non-conference game; Rankings from AP Poll released prior to the game
