= 1948 North Carolina Tar Heels football team =

American college football season

1948 North Carolina Tar Heels football

Sugar Bowl, L 6–14 vs. Oklahoma
- Conference: Southern Conference

Ranking
- AP: No. 3
- Record: 9–1–1 (4–0–1 SoCon)
- Head coach: Carl Snavely (6th season)
- Captains: Hosea Rodgers; Dan Stiegman
- Home stadium: Kenan Memorial Stadium

1948 Southern Conference football standings
	Conf.					Overall
Team	W		L		T	W		L		T
No. 11 Clemson $	5	–	0	–	0	11	–	0	–	0
No. 3 North Carolina	4	–	0	–	1	9	–	1	–	1
VMI	5	–	1	–	0	6	–	3	–	0
No. 17 William & Mary	5	–	1	–	1	7	–	2	–	2
No. 20 Wake Forest	5	–	2	–	0	6	–	4	–	0
Maryland	4	–	2	–	0	6	–	4	–	0
Duke	3	–	2	–	1	4	–	3	–	2
Richmond	3	–	3	–	1	5	–	3	–	2
Washington and Lee	2	–	2	–	0	4	–	6	–	0
Furman	2	–	4	–	0	2	–	6	–	1
George Washington	2	–	4	–	0	4	–	6	–	0
Davidson	2	–	5	–	0	3	–	5	–	1
South Carolina	1	–	3	–	0	3	–	5	–	0
NC State	1	–	4	–	1	3	–	6	–	1
VPI	0	–	6	–	1	0	–	8	–	1
The Citadel	0	–	5	–	0	2	–	7	–	0
$ – Conference champion; Rankings from AP Poll

The 1948 North Carolina Tar Heels football team represented the University of North Carolina during the 1948 college football season. The Tar Heels were led by sixth-year head coach Carl Snavely and played their home games at Kenan Memorial Stadium. The team finished the regular season undefeated with a record of 9–0–1, and outscored their opponents 261–94. North Carolina was ranked third in the final AP Poll of the season (conducted before bowl season), which is to date the highest finish in school history. They were invited to the 1949 Sugar Bowl, where they lost to Big 7 Conference champion Oklahoma.

Halfback Charlie Justice was a consensus first-team All-American, and finished second in the voting for the Heisman Trophy. He led the team in rushing, passing, and punting, with 766 rushing yards, 854 passing yards, and 20 total touchdowns. End Art Weiner was also named an All-American, including first-team by the Football Writers Association of America and the New York Sun.

== Schedule ==
Date	Time	Opponent	Rank	Site	Result	Attendance	Source
September 25	2:30 p.m.	Texas*		Kenan Memorial Stadium; Chapel Hill, NC	W 34–7	43,500	
October 2	2:30 p.m.	at Georgia*		Sanford Stadium; Athens, GA	W 21–14	43,000	
October 9	2:30 p.m.	at Wake Forest	No. 2	Groves Stadium; Wake Forest, NC (rivalry)	W 28–6	27,500	
October 16	2:00 p.m.	NC State	No. 1	Kenan Memorial Stadium; Chapel Hill, NC (rivalry)	W 14–0	44,000	
October 23	2:00 p.m.	LSU*	No. 3	Kenan Memorial Stadium; Chapel Hill, NC	W 34–7	41,000	
October 30	2:30 p.m.	at Tennessee*	No. 3	Shields–Watkins Field; Knoxville, TN	W 14–7	50,000	
November 6	2:00 p.m.	William & Mary	No. 3	Kenan Memorial Stadium; Chapel Hill, NC	T 7–7	43,000	
November 13	2:00 p.m.	at Maryland	No. 6	Griffith Stadium; Washington, DC	W 49–20	36,000	
November 20	2:00 p.m.	Duke	No. 5	Kenan Memorial Stadium; Chapel Hill, NC (Victory Bell)	W 20–0	44,500	
November 27	2:00 p.m.	at Virginia	No. 4	Scott Stadium; Charlottesville, VA (South's Oldest Rivalry)	W 34–12	25,000–26,000	
January 1, 1949	2:48 p.m.	vs. No. 5 Oklahoma*	No. 3	Tulane Stadium; New Orleans, LA (Sugar Bowl)	L 6–14	85,000	
*Non-conference game; Rankings from AP Poll released prior to the game

== Rankings ==
Ranking movements Legend: ██ Increase in ranking ██ Decrease in ranking ( ) = First-place votes
	Week								
Poll	1	2	3	4	5	6	7	8	Final
AP	2 (55)	1 (52)	3 (32)	3 (46)	3 (36)	6 (7)	5 (11)	4 (14)	3 (31)
