= 1948 Wake Forest Demon Deacons football team =

American college football season

1948 Wake Forest Demon Deacons football

Dixie Bowl, L 7–20 vs. Baylor
- Conference: Southern Conference

Ranking
- AP: No. 20
- Record: 6–4 (5–2 SoCon)
- Head coach: Peahead Walker (12th season)
- Captain: Bernie Hanula
- Home stadium: Groves Stadium

1948 Southern Conference football standings
	Conf.					Overall
Team	W		L		T	W		L		T
No. 11 Clemson $	5	–	0	–	0	11	–	0	–	0
No. 3 North Carolina	4	–	0	–	1	9	–	1	–	1
VMI	5	–	1	–	0	6	–	3	–	0
No. 17 William & Mary	5	–	1	–	1	7	–	2	–	2
No. 20 Wake Forest	5	–	2	–	0	6	–	4	–	0
Maryland	4	–	2	–	0	6	–	4	–	0
Duke	3	–	2	–	1	4	–	3	–	2
Richmond	3	–	3	–	1	5	–	3	–	2
Washington and Lee	2	–	2	–	0	4	–	6	–	0
Furman	2	–	4	–	0	2	–	6	–	1
George Washington	2	–	4	–	0	4	–	6	–	0
Davidson	2	–	5	–	0	3	–	5	–	1
South Carolina	1	–	3	–	0	3	–	5	–	0
NC State	1	–	4	–	1	3	–	6	–	1
VPI	0	–	6	–	1	0	–	8	–	1
The Citadel	0	–	5	–	0	2	–	7	–	0
$ – Conference champion; Rankings from AP Poll

The 1948 Wake Forest Demon Deacons football team was an American football team that represented Wake Forest University during the 1948 college football season. In its 12th season under head coach Peahead Walker, the team compiled a 6–4 record, finished in fifth place in the Southern Conference, and lost to Baylor in the 1949 Dixie Bowl.

Back Bill Gregus and end John O'Quinn were selected by the Associated Press as first-team players on the 1948 All-Southern Conference football team.

Wake Forest was ranked at No. 39 in the final Litkenhous Difference by Score System ratings for 1948.

== Schedule ==
Date	Time	Opponent	Rank	Site	Result	Attendance	Source
September 18	3:00 p.m.	George Washington*		Groves Stadium; Wake Forest, NC	W 27–13	10,000	
September 24		at Boston College*		Braves Field; Boston, MA	L 9–26	26,302	
October 2		at William & Mary		Cary Field; Williamsburg, VA	W 21–12	16,000	
October 9		No. 2 North Carolina		Groves Stadium; Wake Forest, NC (rivalry)	L 6–28	27,000	
October 16	8:30 p.m.	at Duquesne*		Forbes Field; Pittsburgh, PA	W 41–15	6,549	
October 30		NC State		Groves Stadium; Wake Forest, NC (rivalry)	W 34–13	22,330	
November 6		at Duke	No. 18	Duke Stadium; Durham, NC (rivalry)	W 27–7	20,000	
November 13	2:00 p.m.	No. 10 Clemson	No. 19	Bowman Gray Stadium; Winston-Salem, NC	L 14–21	20,000	
November 25		at South Carolina		Carolina Stadium; Columbia, SC	W 38–0	18,000	
January 1, 1949		Baylor*	No. 20	Legion Field; Birmingham, AL (Dixie Bowl)	L 7–20	20,000	
*Non-conference game; Rankings from AP Poll released prior to the game

== Rankings ==
Ranking movements Legend: ██ Increase in ranking ██ Decrease in ranking — = Not ranked
	Week								
Poll	1	2	3	4	5	6	7	8	Final
AP	—	—	—	—	18	19	—	—	20
