= 1948 George Washington Colonials football team =

American college football season

1948 George Washington Colonials football
- Conference: Southern Conference
- Record: 4–6 (2–4 SoCon)
- Head coach: Bo Rowland (1st season)
- Home stadium: Griffith Stadium

1948 Southern Conference football standings
	Conf.					Overall
Team	W		L		T	W		L		T
No. 11 Clemson $	5	–	0	–	0	11	–	0	–	0
No. 3 North Carolina	4	–	0	–	1	9	–	1	–	1
VMI	5	–	1	–	0	6	–	3	–	0
No. 17 William & Mary	5	–	1	–	1	7	–	2	–	2
No. 20 Wake Forest	5	–	2	–	0	6	–	4	–	0
Maryland	4	–	2	–	0	6	–	4	–	0
Duke	3	–	2	–	1	4	–	3	–	2
Richmond	3	–	3	–	1	5	–	3	–	2
Washington and Lee	2	–	2	–	0	4	–	6	–	0
Furman	2	–	4	–	0	2	–	6	–	1
George Washington	2	–	4	–	0	4	–	6	–	0
Davidson	2	–	5	–	0	3	–	5	–	1
South Carolina	1	–	3	–	0	3	–	5	–	0
NC State	1	–	4	–	1	3	–	6	–	1
VPI	0	–	6	–	1	0	–	8	–	1
The Citadel	0	–	5	–	0	2	–	7	–	0
$ – Conference champion; Rankings from AP Poll

The 1948 George Washington Colonials football team was an American football team that represented George Washington University as part of the Southern Conference during the 1948 college football season. In their first season under head coach Bo Rowland, the team compiled a 4–6 record (2–4 in the SoCon).

George Washington was ranked at No. 124 in the final Litkenhous Difference by Score System ratings for 1948.

== Schedule ==
Date	Time	Opponent	Site	Result	Attendance	Source
September 18	3:00 p.m.	at Wake Forest	Groves Stadium; Wake Forest, NC	L 13–27	10,000	
September 25		at VPI	Miles Stadium; Blacksburg, VA	W 13–0	11,000	
October 2		VMI	Griffith Stadium; Washington, DC	L 26–6		
October 9		at Virginia*	Scott Stadium; Charlottesville, VA	W 20–12	17,000	
October 15		Kansas*	Griffith Stadium; Washington, DC	L 0–12	13,814	
October 23		Maryland	Griffith Stadium; Washington, DC	L 0–47	16,034	
October 30		at Lafayette*	Fisher Field; Easton, PA	L 14–33	13,000	
November 6		at The Citadel	Johnson Hagood Stadium; Charleston, SC	W 14–0	8,000	
November 13		at Duke	Duke Stadium; Durham, NC	L 0–62	12,000	
November 20		Georgetown*	Griffith Stadium; Washington, DC	W 13–7	11,828	
*Non-conference game
