= John Jiles =

American football player (born 2000)

Profile
- Position: Wide receiver

Personal information
- Born: July 8, 2000 (age 26); Wake Forest, North Carolina, U.S.
- Listed height: 6 ft 3 in (1.91 m)
- Listed weight: 220 lb (100 kg)

Career information
- High school: Wake Forest
- College: Fort Scott CC (2018–2019); Virginia Union (2020–2022); West Florida (2023)
- NFL draft: 2024: undrafted

Career history
- New York Giants (2024)*; New England Patriots (2024–2026)*
- * Offseason or practice squad member only
- Stats at Pro Football Reference

John Jiles (born July 8, 2000) is an American professional football wide receiver. He played college football for the Fort Scott Greyhounds, Virginia Union Panthers and West Florida Argonauts.

== Early life ==
Coming out of high school, Jiles was rated as a three star recruit. He helped the Wake Forest High School football team win back-to-back North Carolina 4AA state championships in 2016 and 2017. He committed to play college football for the Marshall Thundering Herd. However, he failed to meet academic requirements and instead signed with Fort Scott Community College.

== College career ==
=== Fort Scott CC ===
In Jiles' first two seasons at Fort Scott CC, he totaled 95 receptions for 1,543 yards and 12 touchdowns, before entering his name into the NCAA transfer portal.

=== Virginia Union ===
Jiles transferred to play for the Virginia Union Panthers. In his lone season at Virginia Union, Jiles notched 40 receptions for 627 yards and nine touchdowns. Jiles once again entered his name into the transfer portal after the conclusion of the 2022 season.

=== West Florida ===
Jiles transferred to play for the West Florida Argonauts. In Jiles lone season with West Florida, he hauled in 66 receptions for 1,255 yards and 16 touchdowns. For his performance in the 2023 season, Jiles was named a Division 2 All-American. After the conclusion of the 2023 season, Jiles declared for the 2024 NFL draft.

== Professional career ==
Pre-draft measurables
Height	Weight	Arm length	Hand span	Wingspan	40-yard dash	10-yard split	20-yard split	20-yard shuttle	Three-cone drill	Vertical jump	Broad jump	Bench press
6 ft 2 3/4 in (1.90 m)	219 lb (99 kg)	34 3/8 in (0.87 m)	9 3/4 in (0.25 m)	6 ft 9 3/4 in (2.08 m)	4.57 s	1.57 s	2.65 s	4.35 s	7.12 s	34 in (0.86 m)	10 ft 0 in (3.05 m)	17 reps
All values from Pro Day

=== New York Giants ===
After not being selected in the 2024 NFL draft, Jiles signed with the New York Giants as an undrafted free agent. He was waived on August 25.

=== New England Patriots ===
On September 24, Jiles signed to the practice squad of the New England Patriots. He signed a reserve/future contract with the Patriots on January 6, 2025.

On August 26, 2025, Jiles was released by the Patriots as part of final roster cuts. He joined the practice squad the following day. On February 11, 2026, Jiles signed a reserve/futures contract with New England.

On April 27, 2026, Jiles was released by the Patriots.
