= 1948 The Citadel Bulldogs football team =

American college football season

1948 The Citadel Bulldogs football
- Conference: Southern Conference
- Record: 2–7 (0–5 SoCon)
- Head coach: J. Quinn Decker (3rd season)
- Home stadium: Johnson Hagood Stadium

1948 Southern Conference football standings
	Conf.					Overall
Team	W		L		T	W		L		T
No. 11 Clemson $	5	–	0	–	0	11	–	0	–	0
No. 3 North Carolina	4	–	0	–	1	9	–	1	–	1
VMI	5	–	1	–	0	6	–	3	–	0
No. 17 William & Mary	5	–	1	–	1	7	–	2	–	2
No. 20 Wake Forest	5	–	2	–	0	6	–	4	–	0
Maryland	4	–	2	–	0	6	–	4	–	0
Duke	3	–	2	–	1	4	–	3	–	2
Richmond	3	–	3	–	1	5	–	3	–	2
Washington and Lee	2	–	2	–	0	4	–	6	–	0
Furman	2	–	4	–	0	2	–	6	–	1
George Washington	2	–	4	–	0	4	–	6	–	0
Davidson	2	–	5	–	0	3	–	5	–	1
South Carolina	1	–	3	–	0	3	–	5	–	0
NC State	1	–	4	–	1	3	–	6	–	1
VPI	0	–	6	–	1	0	–	8	–	1
The Citadel	0	–	5	–	0	2	–	7	–	0
$ – Conference champion; Rankings from AP Poll

The 1948 The Citadel Bulldogs football team represented The Citadel, The Military College of South Carolina in the 1948 college football season. J. Quinn Decker served as head coach for the third season. The Bulldogs played as members of the Southern Conference and played home games at the new Johnson Hagood Stadium.

The Citadel was ranked at No. 206 in the final Litkenhous Difference by Score System ratings for 1948.

== Schedule ==
Date	Opponent	Site	Result	Attendance	Source
October 1	Presbyterian*	Johnson Hagood Stadium; Charleston, SC	L 0–7		
October 9	at Newberry*	Setzler Field; Newberry, SC	W 14–0		
October 16	Davidson	Johnson Hagood Stadium; Charleston, SC	L 6–14	10,000	
October 23	at Furman	Sirrine Stadium; Greenville, SC (rivalry)	L 0–9	7,000	
October 30	vs. Erskine*	Orangeburg County Fairgrounds; Orangeburg, SC	W 19–0	5,000	
November 6	George Washington	Johnson Hagood Stadium; Charleston, SC	L 0–14	8,000	
November 13	at VMI	Alumni Field; Lexington, VA (rivalry)	L 6–34	3,000	
November 20	at No. 20 Georgia Tech*	Grant Field; Atlanta, GA	L 0–54	15,000	
December 4	No. 10 Clemson	Johnson Hagood Stadium; Charleston, SC	L 0–20	17,000	
*Non-conference game; Rankings from Coaches' Poll released prior to the game
