= 1948 VMI Keydets football team =

American college football season

1948 VMI Keydets football
- Conference: Southern Conference
- Record: 6–3 (5–1 SoCon)
- Head coach: Arthur Morton (2nd season)
- Home stadium: Alumni Field

1948 Southern Conference football standings
	Conf.					Overall
Team	W		L		T	W		L		T
No. 11 Clemson $	5	–	0	–	0	11	–	0	–	0
No. 3 North Carolina	4	–	0	–	1	9	–	1	–	1
VMI	5	–	1	–	0	6	–	3	–	0
No. 17 William & Mary	5	–	1	–	1	7	–	2	–	2
No. 20 Wake Forest	5	–	2	–	0	6	–	4	–	0
Maryland	4	–	2	–	0	6	–	4	–	0
Duke	3	–	2	–	1	4	–	3	–	2
Richmond	3	–	3	–	1	5	–	3	–	2
Washington and Lee	2	–	2	–	0	4	–	6	–	0
Furman	2	–	4	–	0	2	–	6	–	1
George Washington	2	–	4	–	0	4	–	6	–	0
Davidson	2	–	5	–	0	3	–	5	–	1
South Carolina	1	–	3	–	0	3	–	5	–	0
NC State	1	–	4	–	1	3	–	6	–	1
VPI	0	–	6	–	1	0	–	8	–	1
The Citadel	0	–	5	–	0	2	–	7	–	0
$ – Conference champion; Rankings from AP Poll

The 1948 VMI Keydets football team was an American football team that represented the Virginia Military Institute (VMI) during the 1948 college football season as a member of the Southern Conference. In their second year under head coach Arthur Morton, the team compiled an overall record of 6–3.

VMI was ranked at No. 85 in the final Litkenhous Difference by Score System ratings for 1948.

== Schedule ==
Date	Opponent	Site	Result	Attendance	Source
September 25	Catawba*	Alumni Field; Lexington, VA	W 28–6	3,500	
October 2	at George Washington	Griffith Stadium; Washington, DC	W 26–6		
October 9	vs. William & Mary	Foreman Field; Norfolk, VA (Oyster Bowl, rivalry)	L 0–31	21,000	
October 16	at Richmond	City Stadium; Richmond, VA (rivalry)	W 9–0	11,000	
October 23	at Virginia*	Scott Stadium; Charlottesville, VA	L 14–26	20,000	
October 30	Davidson^{†}	Alumni Field; Lexington, VA	W 33–6	5,000	
November 6	at No. 20 Tulane*	Tulane Stadium; New Orleans, LA	L 7–28		
November 13	The Citadel	Alumni Field; Lexington, VA (Rivalry)	W 34–6	3,000	
November 25	vs. VPI	Victory Stadium; Roanoke, VA (rivalry)	W 33–7	29,000	
*Non-conference game; ^{†}Homecoming; Rankings from AP Poll released prior to the game
