= 1948 Virginia Cavaliers football team =

American college football season

1948 Virginia Cavaliers football
- Conference: Independent
- Record: 5–3–1
- Head coach: Art Guepe (3rd season)
- Captain: Joe McCary
- Home stadium: Scott Stadium

1948 Southern major college football independents records
	Conf.			Overall
Team	W	L	T	W		L		T
West Virginia		–		9	–	3	–	0
Virginia		–		5	–	3	–	1
Chattanooga		–		4	–	5	–	0
Georgetown		–		3	–	4	–	1
Miami (FL)		–		4	–	6	–	0
Navy		–		0	–	8	–	1

The 1948 Virginia Cavaliers football team represented the University of Virginia during the 1948 college football season. The Cavaliers were led by third-year head coach Art Guepe and played their home games at Scott Stadium in Charlottesville, Virginia. They competed as independents, finishing with a record of 5–3–1.

Virginia was ranked at No. 72 in the final Litkenhous Difference by Score System ratings for 1948.

== Schedule ==
Date	Opponent	Site	Result	Attendance	Source
September 25	Miami (OH)	Scott Stadium; Charlottesville, VA	T 14–14	15,000	
October 2	vs. VPI	Victory Stadium; Roanoke, VA (rivalry)	W 28–0	17,500	
October 9	George Washington	Scott Stadium; Charlottesville, VA	L 12–20	17,000	
October 16	at Washington and Lee	Wilson Field; Lexington, VA	W 41–6	11,000	
October 23	VMI^{†}	Scott Stadium; Charlottesville, VA	W 26–14	20,000	
October 30	at Princeton	Palmer Stadium; Princeton, NJ	L 14–55	23,000	
November 6	at NC State	Riddick Stadium; Raleigh, NC	W 21–14	15,000	
November 13	West Virginia	Scott Stadium; Charlottesville, VA	W 7–0	17,000	
November 27	No. 4 North Carolina	Scott Stadium; Charlottesville, VA (South's Oldest Rivalry)	L 12–34	25,000–26,000	
^{†}Homecoming; Rankings from AP Poll released prior to the game
