= 1948 Richmond Spiders football team =

American college football season

1948 Richmond Spiders football
- Conference: Southern Conference
- Record: 5–3–2 (3–1–1 SoCon)
- Head coach: Karl Esleeck (1st season)
- Captains: Edward Ralston; Harry Bode
- Home stadium: City Stadium

1948 Southern Conference football standings
	Conf.					Overall
Team	W		L		T	W		L		T
No. 11 Clemson $	5	–	0	–	0	11	–	0	–	0
No. 3 North Carolina	4	–	0	–	1	9	–	1	–	1
VMI	5	–	1	–	0	6	–	3	–	0
No. 17 William & Mary	5	–	1	–	1	7	–	2	–	2
No. 20 Wake Forest	5	–	2	–	0	6	–	4	–	0
Maryland	4	–	2	–	0	6	–	4	–	0
Duke	3	–	2	–	1	4	–	3	–	2
Richmond	3	–	3	–	1	5	–	3	–	2
Washington and Lee	2	–	2	–	0	4	–	6	–	0
Furman	2	–	4	–	0	2	–	6	–	1
George Washington	2	–	4	–	0	4	–	6	–	0
Davidson	2	–	5	–	0	3	–	5	–	1
South Carolina	1	–	3	–	0	3	–	5	–	0
NC State	1	–	4	–	1	3	–	6	–	1
VPI	0	–	6	–	1	0	–	8	–	1
The Citadel	0	–	5	–	0	2	–	7	–	0
$ – Conference champion; Rankings from AP Poll

The 1948 Richmond Spiders football team was an American football team that represented the University of Richmond as a member of the Southern Conference (SoCon) during the 1948 college football season. In their first season under head coach Karl Esleeck, Richmond compiled a 5–3–2 record, with a mark of 3–1–1 in conference play, finishing in eighth place in the SoCon.

Richmond was ranked at No. 117 in the final Litkenhous Difference by Score System ratings for 1948.

== Schedule ==
Date	Opponent	Site	Result	Attendance	Source
September 18	Randolph–Macon*	City Stadium; Richmond, VA	W 35–0	8,000	
September 25	Maryland	City Stadium; Richmond, VA	L 0–19	12,000	
October 9	at Furman	Sirrine Stadium; Greenville, SC	W 7–0	8,000	
October 16	VMI	City Stadium; Richmond, VA (rivalry)	L 0–9	11,000	
October 23	Hampden–Sydney*	City Stadium; Richmond, VA	W 28–7	6,000	
October 30	at William & Mary	Cary Field; Williamsburg, VA (rivalry)	L 6–14	10,000	
November 6	at Davidson	Richardson Stadium; Davidson, NC	W 6–0	7,500	
November 13	VPI	City Stadium; Richmond, VA	T 7–7	12,000	
November 25	Washington and Lee	City Stadium; Richmond, VA	W 14–12		
December 3	at Rollins*	Tangerine Bowl; Orlando, FL	T 27–27		
*Non-conference game
