= 1948 Washington and Lee Generals football team =

American college football season

1948 Washington and Lee Generals football
- Conference: Southern Conference
- Record: 4–6 (2–2 SoCon)
- Head coach: Art Lewis (3rd season)
- Home stadium: Wilson Field

1948 Southern Conference football standings
	Conf.					Overall
Team	W		L		T	W		L		T
No. 11 Clemson $	5	–	0	–	0	11	–	0	–	0
No. 3 North Carolina	4	–	0	–	1	9	–	1	–	1
VMI	5	–	1	–	0	6	–	3	–	0
No. 17 William & Mary	5	–	1	–	1	7	–	2	–	2
No. 20 Wake Forest	5	–	2	–	0	6	–	4	–	0
Maryland	4	–	2	–	0	6	–	4	–	0
Duke	3	–	2	–	1	4	–	3	–	2
Richmond	3	–	3	–	1	5	–	3	–	2
Washington and Lee	2	–	2	–	0	4	–	6	–	0
Furman	2	–	4	–	0	2	–	6	–	1
George Washington	2	–	4	–	0	4	–	6	–	0
Davidson	2	–	5	–	0	3	–	5	–	1
South Carolina	1	–	3	–	0	3	–	5	–	0
NC State	1	–	4	–	1	3	–	6	–	1
VPI	0	–	6	–	1	0	–	8	–	1
The Citadel	0	–	5	–	0	2	–	7	–	0
$ – Conference champion; Rankings from AP Poll

The 1948 Washington and Lee Generals football team was an American football team that represented Washington and Lee University during the 1948 college football season as a member of the Southern Conference. In their third year under head coach Art Lewis, the team compiled an overall record of 4–6, with a mark of 2–2 in conference play.

Washington and Lee was ranked at No. 125 in the final Litkenhous Difference by Score System ratings for 1948.

== Schedule ==
Date	Opponent	Site	Result	Attendance	Source
September 25	Furman	Wilson Field; Lexington, VA	L 7–10		
October 2	Ohio*	Victory Stadium; Roanoke, VA	W 13–0		
October 9	at No. 6 Georgia Tech*	Grant Field; Atlanta, GA	L 0–27	25,000	
October 16	Virginia*	Wilson Field; Lexington, VA	L 6–41	11,000	
October 23	vs. West Virginia*	Laidley Field; Charleston, WV	L 7–14	11,000	
October 30	at No. 7 Penn*	Franklin Field; Philadelphia, PA	L 7–40	50,000	
November 6	vs. VPI	Municipal Stadium; Lynchburg, VA	W 14–7	8,000	
November 13	at Davidson	Richardson Field; Davidson, NC	W 21–20		
November 20	at Delaware*	Wilmington Park; Wilmington, DE	W 21–14	7,500	
November 25	at Richmond	City Stadium; Richmond, VA	L 12–14		
*Non-conference game; Rankings from AP Poll released prior to the game
