= 1948 William & Mary Indians football team =

American college football season

1948 William & Mary Indians football

Delta Bowl champion

Delta Bowl, W 20–0 vs. Oklahoma A&M
- Conference: Southern Conference

Ranking
- AP: No. 17
- Record: 7–2–2 (5–1–1 SoCon)
- Head coach: Rube McCray (5th season)
- Captains: Harry Caughron; Lou Hoitsma
- Home stadium: Cary Field

1948 Southern Conference football standings
	Conf.					Overall
Team	W		L		T	W		L		T
No. 11 Clemson $	5	–	0	–	0	11	–	0	–	0
No. 3 North Carolina	4	–	0	–	1	9	–	1	–	1
VMI	5	–	1	–	0	6	–	3	–	0
No. 17 William & Mary	5	–	1	–	1	7	–	2	–	2
No. 20 Wake Forest	5	–	2	–	0	6	–	4	–	0
Maryland	4	–	2	–	0	6	–	4	–	0
Duke	3	–	2	–	1	4	–	3	–	2
Richmond	3	–	3	–	1	5	–	3	–	2
Washington and Lee	2	–	2	–	0	4	–	6	–	0
Furman	2	–	4	–	0	2	–	6	–	1
George Washington	2	–	4	–	0	4	–	6	–	0
Davidson	2	–	5	–	0	3	–	5	–	1
South Carolina	1	–	3	–	0	3	–	5	–	0
NC State	1	–	4	–	1	3	–	6	–	1
VPI	0	–	6	–	1	0	–	8	–	1
The Citadel	0	–	5	–	0	2	–	7	–	0
$ – Conference champion; Rankings from AP Poll

The 1948 William & Mary Indians football team represented William & Mary during the 1948 college football season. The William & Mary Indians finished the regular season ranked #17 in the AP Poll after their 9–0 win over Arkansas. Also, the Indians tied #3 North Carolina, 7–7, in Chapel Hill.

William & Mary was ranked at No. 44 in the final Litkenhous Difference by Score System ratings for 1948.

== Schedule ==
Date	Opponent	Rank	Site	Result	Attendance	Source
September 25	at Davidson		American Legion Memorial Stadium; Charlotte, NC	W 14–6	8,000	
October 2	Wake Forest		Cary Field; Williamsburg, VA	L 12–21	16,000	
October 9	vs. VMI		Foreman Field; Norfolk, VA (Oyster Bowl, rivalry)	W 31–0	21,000	
October 16	at VPI		Miles Stadium; Blacksburg, VA	W 30–0	15,000	
October 23	at St. Bonaventure*		Forness Stadium; Olean, NY	L 6–7	11,500	
October 30	Richmond^{†}		Cary Field; Williamsburg, VA (rivalry)	W 14–6	10,000	
November 6	at No. 3 North Carolina		Kenan Memorial Stadium; Chapel Hill, NC	T 7–7	43,000	
November 13	at Boston College*		Braves Field; Boston, MA	T 14–14	15,112	
November 20	NC State		Cary Field; Williamsburg, VA	W 26–6	11,000	
November 27	at Arkansas*	No. 20	War Memorial Stadium; Little Rock, AR	W 9–0	26,000	
January 1, 1949	vs. Oklahoma A&M*	No. 17	Crump Stadium; Memphis, TN (Delta Bowl)	W 20–0	15,069	
*Non-conference game; ^{†}Homecoming; Rankings from AP Poll released prior to the game

== Rankings ==
Ranking movements Legend: ██ Increase in ranking ██ Decrease in ranking — = Not ranked
	Week								
Poll	1	2	3	4	5	6	7	8	Final
AP	—	—	—	—	—	—	—	20	17

== NFL draft selections ==
= Pro Football Hall of Fame	= Canadian Football Hall of Fame	= College Football Hall of Fame

Year	Round	Pick	Overall	Name	Team	Position
1949	14	7	138	Pat Haggerty	Washington Redskins	End
1949	16	2	153	Jack Bruce	Boston Yanks	Back
