= 1948 South Carolina Gamecocks football team =

American college football season

1948 South Carolina Gamecocks football
- Conference: Southern Conference
- Record: 3–5 (1–3 SoCon)
- Head coach: Rex Enright (8th season)
- Captains: Al Faress; Jack Crouch
- Home stadium: Carolina Municipal Stadium

1948 Southern Conference football standings
	Conf.					Overall
Team	W		L		T	W		L		T
No. 11 Clemson $	5	–	0	–	0	11	–	0	–	0
No. 3 North Carolina	4	–	0	–	1	9	–	1	–	1
VMI	5	–	1	–	0	6	–	3	–	0
No. 17 William & Mary	5	–	1	–	1	7	–	2	–	2
No. 20 Wake Forest	5	–	2	–	0	6	–	4	–	0
Maryland	4	–	2	–	0	6	–	4	–	0
Duke	3	–	2	–	1	4	–	3	–	2
Richmond	3	–	3	–	1	5	–	3	–	2
Washington and Lee	2	–	2	–	0	4	–	6	–	0
Furman	2	–	4	–	0	2	–	6	–	1
George Washington	2	–	4	–	0	4	–	6	–	0
Davidson	2	–	5	–	0	3	–	5	–	1
South Carolina	1	–	3	–	0	3	–	5	–	0
NC State	1	–	4	–	1	3	–	6	–	1
VPI	0	–	6	–	1	0	–	8	–	1
The Citadel	0	–	5	–	0	2	–	7	–	0
$ – Conference champion; Rankings from AP Poll

The 1948 South Carolina Gamecocks football team was an American football team that represented the University of South Carolina as a member of the Southern Conference (SoCon) during the 1948 college football season. In their eighth season under head coach Rex Enright, the Gamecocks compiled an overall record of 3–5 with a mark of 1–3 in conference play, placing 13th in the SoCon.

In the final Litkenhous Difference by Score System ratings for 1948, South Carolina was ranked at No. 98.

== Schedule ==
Date	Opponent	Site	Result	Attendance	Source
September 24	Newberry*	Carolina Stadium; Columbia, SC	W 46–0	14,500	
October 1	at Furman	Sirrine Stadium; Greenville, SC	W 7–0		
October 9	at Tulane*	Tulane Stadium; New Orleans, LA	L 0–14	35,000	
October 21	No. 14 Clemson	Carolina Stadium; Columbia, SC (rivalry)	L 7–13	25,000	
October 30	at West Virginia*	Mountaineer Field; Morgantown, WV	L 12–35	24,000	
November 6	Maryland	Carolina Stadium; Columbia, SC	L 7–19	11,000	
November 13	at Tulsa*	Skelly Field; Tulsa, OK	W 27–7	9,200	
November 25	Wake Forest	Carolina Stadium; Columbia, SC	L 0–38	18,000	
*Non-conference game; Rankings from AP Poll released prior to the game
