= 1948 Duke Blue Devils football team =

American college football season

1948 Duke Blue Devils football
- Conference: Southern Conference
- Record: 4–3–2 (3–2–1 SoCon)
- Head coach: Wallace Wade (14th season)
- MVP: Bill Davis
- Captain: Al DeRogatis
- Home stadium: Duke Stadium

1948 Southern Conference football standings
	Conf.					Overall
Team	W		L		T	W		L		T
No. 11 Clemson $	5	–	0	–	0	11	–	0	–	0
No. 3 North Carolina	4	–	0	–	1	9	–	1	–	1
VMI	5	–	1	–	0	6	–	3	–	0
No. 17 William & Mary	5	–	1	–	1	7	–	2	–	2
No. 20 Wake Forest	5	–	2	–	0	6	–	4	–	0
Maryland	4	–	2	–	0	6	–	4	–	0
Duke	3	–	2	–	1	4	–	3	–	2
Richmond	3	–	3	–	1	5	–	3	–	2
Washington and Lee	2	–	2	–	0	4	–	6	–	0
Furman	2	–	4	–	0	2	–	6	–	1
George Washington	2	–	4	–	0	4	–	6	–	0
Davidson	2	–	5	–	0	3	–	5	–	1
South Carolina	1	–	3	–	0	3	–	5	–	0
NC State	1	–	4	–	1	3	–	6	–	1
VPI	0	–	6	–	1	0	–	8	–	1
The Citadel	0	–	5	–	0	2	–	7	–	0
$ – Conference champion; Rankings from AP Poll

The 1948 Duke Blue Devils football team represented the Duke Blue Devils of Duke University during the 1948 college football season.

Duke was ranked at No. 37 in the final Litkenhous Difference by Score System ratings for 1948.

== Schedule ==
Date	Time	Opponent	Rank	Site	Result	Attendance	Source
September 25		at NC State		Riddick Stadium; Raleigh, NC (rivalry)	T 0–0	20,000	
October 2		Tennessee*		Duke Stadium; Durham, NC	T 7–7	22,000	
October 9		Navy*		Duke Stadium; Durham, NC	W 28–7	25,000	
October 16		at Maryland	No. 18	Griffith Stadium; Washington, DC	W 13–12	21,904	
October 23	2:30 p.m.	vs. VPI	No. 15	Victory Stadium; Roanoke, VA	W 7–0	13,500	
October 30		No. 6 Georgia Tech*^{†}		Duke Stadium; Durham, NC	L 7–19	32,000	
November 6		No. 18 Wake Forest		Duke Stadium; Durham, NC (rivalry)	L 20–27	20,000	
November 13		George Washington		Duke Stadium; Durham, NC	W 62–0	12,000	
November 20		at No. 5 North Carolina		Kenan Memorial Stadium; Chapel Hill, NC (Victory Bell)	L 0–20	44,500	
*Non-conference game; ^{†}Homecoming; Rankings from AP Poll released prior to the game

== Rankings ==
Ranking movements Legend: ██ Increase in ranking ██ Decrease in ranking — = Not ranked т = Tied with team above or below
	Week								
Poll	1	2	3	4	5	6	7	8	Final
AP	—	18	15т	—	—	—	—	—	—
