= Karl Esleeck =

American football player and coach (1903–1952)

Biographical details
- Born: August 18, 1903; Portsmouth, Virginia, U.S.
- Died: December 10, 1952 (aged 49); Portsmouth, Virginia, U.S.

Playing career
- 1924–1926: VPI
- Position: Halfback

Coaching career (HC unless noted)
- 1948–1950: Richmond

Head coaching record
- Overall: 10–18–2

Karl Augustus "Dick" Esleeck (August 18, 1903 – December 10, 1952) was an American college football coach. He served as the head football coach at the University of Richmond from 1948 until 1950, compiling a record of 10–18–2. Esleeck attended and played college football at Virginia Agricultural and Mechanical College and Polytechnic Institute—now known as Virginia Tech—finishing his career in 1926. His accomplishments at Tech led to his induction into the Virginia Tech Sports Hall of Fame.

Prior to his college coaching stint at Richmond, he coached several high school teams to state championship. He died after a long illness in 1952. In 1977, Esleeck was inducted into the Virginia Sports Hall of Fame, the state-wide organization that recognizes athletic achievements by state natives, or who played or coached for teams in the state.

== Head coaching record ==
Year	Team	Overall	Conference	Standing	Bowl/playoffs
Richmond Spiders (Southern Conference) (1948–1950)
1948	Richmond	5–3–2	3–3–1	T–8th	
1949	Richmond	3–7	2–6	15th	
1950	Richmond	2–8	1–8	16th	
Richmond:		10–18–2	6–17–1		
Total:		10–18–2			
