= Darius Hodge =

American football player (born 1998)

No. 44
- Position: Defensive lineman

Personal information
- Born: July 3, 1998 (age 28); Wake Forest, North Carolina, U.S.
- Listed height: 6 ft 1 in (1.85 m)
- Listed weight: 245 lb (111 kg)

Career information
- High school: Wake Forest
- College: Marshall
- NFL draft: 2021: undrafted

Career history
- Cincinnati Bengals (2021); Miami Dolphins (2021); Philadelphia Stars (2023); Calgary Stampeders (2024)*
- * Offseason or practice squad member only

Awards and highlights
- First-team All-C-USA (2020)
- Stats at Pro Football Reference

Darius Hodge (born July 3, 1998) is an American former professional football defensive lineman. He played college football for the Marshall Thundering Herd.

== Early life ==
Hodge attended Wake Forest High School, where he was teammates with Dexter Lawrence and Bryce Love.

== College career ==
Hodge played for the Marshall Thundering Herd for four seasons and redshirted his true freshman year. He finished his collegiate career with 117 tackles, 20.5 tackles for loss, and 15.5 sacks. Following the end of his redshirt junior season, Hodge announced that he would forgo his redshirt senior season to enter the 2021 NFL Draft.

== Professional career ==
=== Cincinnati Bengals ===
Hodge signed with the Cincinnati Bengals as an undrafted free agent on May 14, 2021. He made the Bengals' 53-man roster out of training camp. He played in four games before being waived on November 4, 2021.

=== Miami Dolphins ===
On November 5, 2021, Hodge was claimed off waivers by the Miami Dolphins. He was suspended two games on December 18 for violating the NFL's performance-enhancing drug policy.

On August 29, 2022, Hodge was waived/injured and placed on injured reserve. He was released on September 9.

=== Philadelphia Stars ===
On January 28, 2023, Hodge signed with the Philadelphia Stars of the United States Football League (USFL). He was placed on the injured reserve list on April 3, and moved to the inactive roster on May 16. The Stars folded when the XFL and USFL merged to create the United Football League (UFL).

=== Calgary Stampeders ===
Hodge signed with the Calgary Stampeders of the Canadian Football League (CFL) on February 13, 2024. He was released on June 2, 2024.
