= 1948 Maryland Terrapins football team =

American college football season

1948 Maryland Terrapins football
- Conference: Southern Conference
- Record: 6–4 (4–2 SoCon)
- Head coach: Jim Tatum (2nd season)
- Offensive scheme: Split-T
- Captain: Gene Kinney
- Home stadium: Griffith Stadium

1948 Southern Conference football standings
	Conf.					Overall
Team	W		L		T	W		L		T
No. 11 Clemson $	5	–	0	–	0	11	–	0	–	0
No. 3 North Carolina	4	–	0	–	1	9	–	1	–	1
VMI	5	–	1	–	0	6	–	3	–	0
No. 17 William & Mary	5	–	1	–	1	7	–	2	–	2
No. 20 Wake Forest	5	–	2	–	0	6	–	4	–	0
Maryland	4	–	2	–	0	6	–	4	–	0
Duke	3	–	2	–	1	4	–	3	–	2
Richmond	3	–	3	–	1	5	–	3	–	2
Washington and Lee	2	–	2	–	0	4	–	6	–	0
Furman	2	–	4	–	0	2	–	6	–	1
George Washington	2	–	4	–	0	4	–	6	–	0
Davidson	2	–	5	–	0	3	–	5	–	1
South Carolina	1	–	3	–	0	3	–	5	–	0
NC State	1	–	4	–	1	3	–	6	–	1
VPI	0	–	6	–	1	0	–	8	–	1
The Citadel	0	–	5	–	0	2	–	7	–	0
$ – Conference champion; Rankings from AP Poll

The 1948 Maryland Terrapins football team represented the University of Maryland in 1948 college football season as a member of the Southern Conference (SoCon). Jim Tatum served as the head coach for the second year of his nine-year tenure. The Terrapins compiled a 6–4 record, which proved to be the worst of Tatum's term at Maryland and the only one in which his team lost more than two games. Griffith Stadium was temporarily used as the home field, as an interim venue between the original Byrd Stadium and the much larger, newly constructed stadium of the same name.

Maryland was ranked at No. 51 in the final Litkenhous Difference by Score System ratings for 1948.

== Schedule ==
Date	Opponent	Site	Result	Attendance	Source
September 25	at Richmond	City Stadium; Richmond, VA	W 19–0	12,000	
October 2	at Delaware*	Wilmington Park; Wilmington, DE	W 21–0	14,000	
October 9	VPI	Griffith Stadium; Washington, DC	W 28–0	11,700	
October 16	No. 18 Duke^{†}	Griffith Stadium; Washington, DC	L 12–13	21,904	
October 23	George Washington	Griffith Stadium; Washington, DC	W 47–0	16,034	
October 29	at Miami (FL)*	Burdine Stadium; Miami, FL	W 27–13	33,304	
November 6	at South Carolina	Carolina Stadium; Columbia, SC	W 19–7	11,000	
November 13	No. 6 North Carolina	Griffith Stadium; Washington, DC	L 20–49	34,588	
November 20	Vanderbilt*	Griffith Stadium; Washington, DC	L 0–34	21,000	
November 27	at West Virginia*	Mountaineer Field; Morgantown, WV (rivalry)	L 14–16	18,000	
*Non-conference game; ^{†}Homecoming; Rankings from AP Poll released prior to the game

== Coaching staff ==
- Jim Tatum, head coach
- Flucie Stewart
- George Barclay
- Houston Elder
- Sully Krouse
- John Cudmore
- Warren Giese
- Bill Meek, freshman coach
- Duke Wyre, trainer
- W. W. Cobey, graduate manager
