= Carl Snavely =

American football and baseball coach (1894–1975)

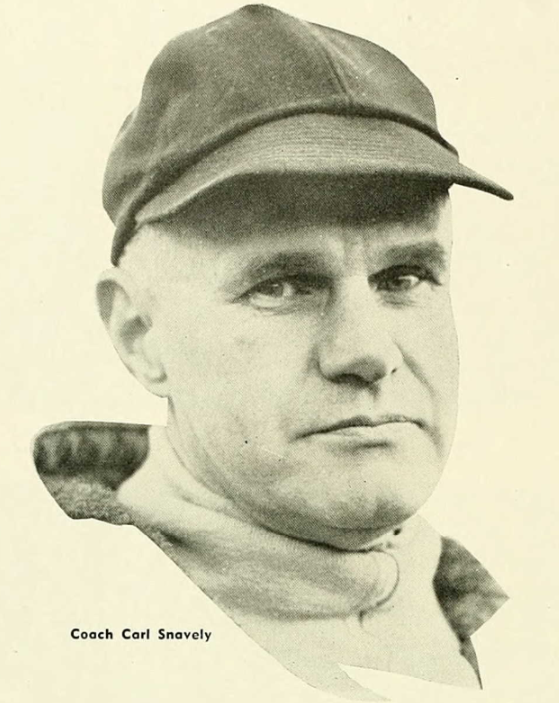
- Snavely from 1951 Yackety Yack, North Carolina yearbook

Biographical details
- Born: July 30, 1894; Omaha, Nebraska, U.S.
- Died: July 12, 1975 (aged 80); St. Louis, Missouri, U.S.

Playing career

Football
- 1911–1914: Lebanon Valley

Baseball
- c. 1914: Lebanon Valley
- 1914: York White Roses / Lancaster Red Roses
- 1915: Chambersburg Maroons
- Position: First baseman (baseball)

Coaching career (HC unless noted)

Football
- 1921: Marietta (backfield)
- 1922–1926: Bellefonte Academy (PA)
- 1927–1933: Bucknell
- 1934–1935: North Carolina
- 1936–1944: Cornell
- 1945–1952: North Carolina
- 1953–1958: Washington University

Basketball
- 1921–1922: Marietta

Baseball
- 1922: Marietta
- 1928–1934: Bucknell

Head coaching record
- Overall: 180–96–16 (college football); 4–14 (college basketball); 34–61 (college baseball); 40–2–3 (high school football)
- Bowls: 0–3

Accomplishments and honors

Championships
- 1 National (1939); 2 SoCon (1946, 1949)
- College Football Hall of Fame; Inducted in 1965 (profile)

Carl Gray "the Grey Fox" Snavely (July 30, 1894 – July 12, 1975) was an American football and baseball coach. He served as the head football coach at Bucknell University (1927–1933), the University of North Carolina at Chapel Hill (1934–1935, 1945–1952), Cornell University (1936–1944), and Washington University in St. Louis (1953–1958), compiling a career college football record of 180–96–16. Snavely was inducted into the College Football Hall of Fame as a coach in 1965.

Snavley was the head football coach at Bellefonte Academy in Bellefonte, Pennsylvania from 1922 to 1926, tallying a mark of 40–2–3 in five seasons. From 1927 to 1933, Snavely served as the head football coach at Bucknell, where he compiled a 42–16–8 record. From 1934 to 1935, and from 1945 to 1952, he served as the head football coach at North Carolina, where he compiled a 59–35–5 record. He was a proponent of the single wing offense. From 1936 to 1944, he served as the head football coach at Cornell, where he compiled a 46–26–3 record. He was a 1915 graduate of Lebanon Valley College in Annville, Pennsylvania, where he played four years on the football team. He was a 1976 inductee into their athletic Hall of Fame.

== Head coaching record ==
=== College football ===
Year	Team	Overall	Conference	Standing	Bowl/playoffs	AP^{#}
Bucknell (Independent) (1927–1933)
1927	Bucknell	6–3–1				
1928	Bucknell	5–2–3				
1929	Bucknell	8–2				
1930	Bucknell	6–3				
1931	Bucknell	6–0–3				
1932	Bucknell	4–4–1				
1933	Bucknell	7–2				
Bucknell:		42–16–8				
North Carolina Tar Heels (Southern Conference) (1934–1935)
1934	North Carolina	7–1–1	2–0–1	2nd		
1935	North Carolina	8–1	4–1	2nd		
Cornell Big Red (Independent) (1936–1944)
1936	Cornell	3–5				
1937	Cornell	5–2–1				
1938	Cornell	5–1–1				12
1939	Cornell	8–0				4
1940	Cornell	6–2				15
1941	Cornell	5–3				
1942	Cornell	3–5–1				
1943	Cornell	6–4				
1944	Cornell	5–4				
Cornell:		46–26–3				
North Carolina Tar Heels (Southern Conference) (1945–1952)
1945	North Carolina	5–5	2–2	7th		
1946	North Carolina	8–2–1	4–0–1	1st	L Sugar	9
1947	North Carolina	8–2	4–1	2nd		9
1948	North Carolina	9–1–1	4–0–1	2nd	L Sugar	3
1949	North Carolina	7–4	5–0	1st	L Cotton	16
1950	North Carolina	3–5–2	3–2–1	2nd		
1951	North Carolina	2–8	2–3	T–10th		
1952	North Carolina	2–6	1–2	T–9th		
North Carolina:		59–35–5	25–21–4			
Washington University Bears (Independent) (1953–1958)
1953	Washington University	7–2				
1954	Washington University	6–3				
1955	Washington University	5–4				
1956	Washington University	6–3				
1957	Washington University	5–3				
1958	Washington University	4–4				
Washington University:		33–19				
Total:		180–96–16				
National championship Conference title Conference division title or championship game berth
^{#}Rankings from final AP Poll.
