= 1948 VPI Gobblers football team =

American college football season

1948 VPI Gobblers football
- Conference: Southern Conference
- Record: 0–8–1 (0–6–1 SoCon)
- Head coach: Bob McNeish (1st season)
- Captain: Thomas C. Burns
- Home stadium: Miles Stadium

1948 Southern Conference football standings
	Conf.					Overall
Team	W		L		T	W		L		T
No. 11 Clemson $	5	–	0	–	0	11	–	0	–	0
No. 3 North Carolina	4	–	0	–	1	9	–	1	–	1
VMI	5	–	1	–	0	6	–	3	–	0
No. 17 William & Mary	5	–	1	–	1	7	–	2	–	2
No. 20 Wake Forest	5	–	2	–	0	6	–	4	–	0
Maryland	4	–	2	–	0	6	–	4	–	0
Duke	3	–	2	–	1	4	–	3	–	2
Richmond	3	–	3	–	1	5	–	3	–	2
Washington and Lee	2	–	2	–	0	4	–	6	–	0
Furman	2	–	4	–	0	2	–	6	–	1
George Washington	2	–	4	–	0	4	–	6	–	0
Davidson	2	–	5	–	0	3	–	5	–	1
South Carolina	1	–	3	–	0	3	–	5	–	0
NC State	1	–	4	–	1	3	–	6	–	1
VPI	0	–	6	–	1	0	–	8	–	1
The Citadel	0	–	5	–	0	2	–	7	–	0
$ – Conference champion; Rankings from AP Poll

The 1948 VPI Gobblers football team represented Virginia Polytechnic Institute in the 1948 college football season. The team was led by their head coach Bob McNeish and finished with a record of zero wins, eight losses and one tie (0–8–1).

VPI was ranked at No. 151 in the final Litkenhous Difference by Score System ratings for 1948.

== Schedule ==
Date	Time	Opponent	Site	Result	Attendance	Source
September 25	3:00 p.m.	George Washington	Miles Stadium; Blacksburg, VA	L 0–13	11,000	
October 2	3:00 p.m.	vs. Virginia*	Victory Stadium; Roanoke, VA (rivalry)	L 0–28	17,500	
October 9	2:00 p.m.	vs. Maryland	Griffith Stadium; Washington, DC	L 0–28	11,700	
October 16	2:30 p.m.	William & Mary^{†}	Miles Stadium; Blacksburg, VA	L 0–30	15,000	
October 23	2:30 p.m.	vs. No. 15 Duke	Victory Stadium; Roanoke, VA	L 0–7	13,500	
October 30	2:00 p.m.	at No. 5 Army*	Michie Stadium; West Point, NY	L 7–49	27,000	
November 6	2:30 p.m.	vs. Washington and Lee	Municipal Stadium; Lynchburg, VA	L 7–14	8,000	
November 13	2:30 p.m.	at Richmond	City Stadium; Richmond, VA	T 7–7	12,000	
November 25	2:00 p.m.	vs. VMI	Victory Stadium; Roanoke, VA (rivalry)	L 7–33	29,000	
*Non-conference game; ^{†}Homecoming; Rankings from AP Poll released prior to the game; All times are in Eastern time

== NFL draft selections ==
= Pro Football Hall of Fame	= Canadian Football Hall of Fame	= College Football Hall of Fame

Year	Round	Pick	Overall	Name	Team	Position
1951	28	10	337	Sterling Wingo	Los Angeles Rams	Back

== Roster ==
The following players were members of the 1948 football team according to the roster published in the 1949 edition of The Bugle, the Virginia Tech yearbook.

VPI 1948 roster
Victor Anderson; Ralph Coe Beard; Raymond Rucker Beasley; James William Blair; Thomas Craig Burns (Capt.); Ronald Herman Casto; Coy Lenard Chambers; Joseph Litton Church; Pete "Chip" Collum; Billy Patrick DeNardo; Hubert Wallace Dutton; Bruce Mills "Bud" Fisher; Charles Mugler Forbes; James Forrest; Robert Fracker; Richard "Bob" Gilley; Richard D. Goodman; Frank Hargrove; William Hughes Hegamyer	Robert Hess; Andre Hodgson; Holcomb; Oren Edward Hopkins; Tom Howard; Jack Ross Ittner; Johnson; Charles Edward Kernan; Jimmy Kitts; Timothy Lawler; Carl Leonard; Bill Loomis; Kerry Jennings McBroom; Hamilton Otey Meriwether; Roger Rowland Neel; Oliver; Ross Moore Orr; Erving Hascall Rand; Jay B. Ratliff	Charles Ronald Raugh; Roy Carrington Robinette; Pete Smith; Warren William Squires; C. William Stultz; Bob Taylor; Franklin Ray Taylor; David Lacy Thomas; Vernon; Robert James Wachter; W. Harry Walton; Robert Franklin Webb; Richard White; Donald Lindbergh Whiteman; Sterling Lagrand Wingo; Gerhard Charles Zekert; Paul Ethan "Zig" Zender
