= 1948 Furman Purple Hurricane football team =

American college football season

1948 Furman Purple Hurricane football
- Conference: Southern Conference
- Record: 2–6–1 (2–4 SoCon)
- Head coach: Red Smith (1st season)
- Captain: Sonny Byrd
- Home stadium: Sirrine Stadium

1948 Southern Conference football standings
	Conf.					Overall
Team	W		L		T	W		L		T
No. 11 Clemson $	5	–	0	–	0	11	–	0	–	0
No. 3 North Carolina	4	–	0	–	1	9	–	1	–	1
VMI	5	–	1	–	0	6	–	3	–	0
No. 17 William & Mary	5	–	1	–	1	7	–	2	–	2
No. 20 Wake Forest	5	–	2	–	0	6	–	4	–	0
Maryland	4	–	2	–	0	6	–	4	–	0
Duke	3	–	2	–	1	4	–	3	–	2
Richmond	3	–	3	–	1	5	–	3	–	2
Washington and Lee	2	–	2	–	0	4	–	6	–	0
Furman	2	–	4	–	0	2	–	6	–	1
George Washington	2	–	4	–	0	4	–	6	–	0
Davidson	2	–	5	–	0	3	–	5	–	1
South Carolina	1	–	3	–	0	3	–	5	–	0
NC State	1	–	4	–	1	3	–	6	–	1
VPI	0	–	6	–	1	0	–	8	–	1
The Citadel	0	–	5	–	0	2	–	7	–	0
$ – Conference champion; Rankings from AP Poll

The 1948 Furman Purple Hurricane football team was an American football team that represented Furman University as a member of the Southern Conference (SoCon) during the 1948 college football season. In their first year under head coach Red Smith, the Purple Hurricane compiled an overall record of 2–6–1, with a conference mark of 2–4, and finished tied for tenth in the SoCon.

Furman was ranked at No. 154 in the final Litkenhous Difference by Score System ratings for 1948.

== Schedule ==
Date	Opponent	Site	Result	Attendance	Source
September 25	at Washington and Lee	Wilson Field; Lexington, VA	W 10–7		
October 1	South Carolina	Sirrine Stadium; Greenville, SC	L 0–7		
October 9	Richmond	Sirrine Stadium; Greenville, SC	L 0–7	8,000	
October 16	Wofford*	Sirrine Stadium; Greenville, SC (rivalry)	T 7–7	7,000	
October 23	The Citadel	Sirrine Stadium; Greenville, SC (rivalry)	W 9–0	7,000	
October 30	Florida*	Sirrine Stadium; Greenville, SC	L 14–39	6,500	
November 6	at No. 12 Clemson	Memorial Stadium; Clemson, SC	L 0–41	15,000	
November 20	at No. 11 Georgia*	Sanford Stadium; Athens, GA	L 0–33	17,000	
November 25	at Davidson	American Legion Memorial Stadium; Charlotte, NC	L 0–7	8,500	
*Non-conference game; Rankings from AP Poll released prior to the game
