= 1948 Clemson Tigers football team =

American college football season

1948 Clemson Tigers football

SoCon champion Gator Bowl champion

Gator Bowl, W 24–23 vs. Missouri
- Conference: Southern Conference

Ranking
- AP: No. 11
- Record: 11–0 (5–0 SoCon)
- Head coach: Frank Howard (9th season)
- Captains: Bob Martin; Phil Prince
- Home stadium: Memorial Stadium

1948 Southern Conference football standings
	Conf.					Overall
Team	W		L		T	W		L		T
No. 11 Clemson $	5	–	0	–	0	11	–	0	–	0
No. 3 North Carolina	4	–	0	–	1	9	–	1	–	1
VMI	5	–	1	–	0	6	–	3	–	0
No. 17 William & Mary	5	–	1	–	1	7	–	2	–	2
No. 20 Wake Forest	5	–	2	–	0	6	–	4	–	0
Maryland	4	–	2	–	0	6	–	4	–	0
Duke	3	–	2	–	1	4	–	3	–	2
Richmond	3	–	3	–	1	5	–	3	–	2
Washington and Lee	2	–	2	–	0	4	–	6	–	0
Furman	2	–	4	–	0	2	–	6	–	1
George Washington	2	–	4	–	0	4	–	6	–	0
Davidson	2	–	5	–	0	3	–	5	–	1
South Carolina	1	–	3	–	0	3	–	5	–	0
NC State	1	–	4	–	1	3	–	6	–	1
VPI	0	–	6	–	1	0	–	8	–	1
The Citadel	0	–	5	–	0	2	–	7	–	0
$ – Conference champion; Rankings from AP Poll

The 1948 Clemson Tigers football team was an American football team that represented Clemson College in the Southern Conference during the 1948 college football season. In its ninth season under head coach Frank Howard, the team compiled an 11–0 record (5–0 against conference opponents), won the Southern Conference championship, was ranked No. 11 in the final AP Poll, defeated Missouri in the 1949 Gator Bowl, and outscored all opponents by a total of 274 to 76. This team was the only unbeaten and untied team in the 1948 NCAA season who also participated in post-season play in a bowl game versus Missouri. The team played its home games at Memorial Stadium in Clemson, South Carolina. Memorial Stadium hosted its first night game in the opener against Presbyterian College.

The team's statistical leaders included tailback Bobby Gage with 799 passing yards and wingback Ray Mathews with 646 rushing yards and 78 points scored (13 touchdowns).

Bob Martin and Phil Prince were the team captains. Guard Frank Gillespie and back Bobby Gage were selected as first-team players on the 1948 All-Southern Conference football team. Seven Clemson players were named to the All-South Carolina football team for 1948: tackle Phil Prince and Tom Salisbury; guard Frank Gillespie; center Gene Moore; and backs Bobby Gage, Ray Mathews, and Fred Cone.

== Schedule ==
Date	Time	Opponent	Rank	Site	Result	Attendance	Source
September 25	8:00 p.m.	Presbyterian*		Memorial Stadium; Clemson, SC	W 53–0	15,000	
October 2	8:00 p.m.	NC State		Memorial Stadium; Clemson, SC (rivlary)	W 6–0	20,500	
October 9	3:30 p.m.	at Mississippi State*		Scott Field; Starkville, MS	W 21–7	12,000	
October 21	2:00 p.m.	at South Carolina	No. 14	Carolina Stadium; Columbia, SC (rivalry)	W 13–7	25,000	
October 29	8:30 p.m.	at Boston College*	No. 13	Braves Field; Boston, MA (rivalry)	W 26–19	25,169	
November 6	2:00 p.m.	Furman	No. 12	Memorial Stadium; Clemson, SC	W 41–0	15,000	
November 13	2:00 p.m.	No. 19 Wake Forest	No. 10	Memorial Stadium; Clemson, SC	W 21–14	20,000	
November 20	2:00 p.m.	Duquesne*^{†}	No. 9	Memorial Stadium; Clemson, SC	W 42–0	17,500	
November 27	3:00 p.m.	at Auburn*	No. 9	Ladd Stadium; Mobile, AL (rivalry)	W 7–6	14,110	
December 4	2:30 p.m.	at The Citadel*	No. 11	Johnson Hagood Stadium; Charleston, SC	W 20–0	17,000	
January 1, 1949		vs. Missouri*	No. 11	Gator Bowl Stadium; Jacksonville, FL (Gator Bowl)	W 24–23	35,273	
*Non-conference game; ^{†}Homecoming; Rankings from AP Poll released prior to the game

== Rankings ==
Ranking movements Legend: ██ Increase in ranking ██ Decrease in ranking — = Not ranked ( ) = First-place votes
	Week								
Poll	1	2	3	4	5	6	7	8	Final
AP	—	15	14	13	12 (6)	10 (8)	9 (9)	9 (8)	11 (6)
