= 1948 Davidson Wildcats football team =

American college football season

1948 Davidson Wildcats football
- Conference: Southern Conference
- Record: 3–5–1 (2–5 SoCon)
- Head coach: Lefty Jamerson (1st season)
- Home stadium: Richardson Stadium; American Legion Memorial Stadium

1948 Southern Conference football standings
	Conf.					Overall
Team	W		L		T	W		L		T
No. 11 Clemson $	5	–	0	–	0	11	–	0	–	0
No. 3 North Carolina	4	–	0	–	1	9	–	1	–	1
VMI	5	–	1	–	0	6	–	3	–	0
No. 17 William & Mary	5	–	1	–	1	7	–	2	–	2
No. 20 Wake Forest	5	–	2	–	0	6	–	4	–	0
Maryland	4	–	2	–	0	6	–	4	–	0
Duke	3	–	2	–	1	4	–	3	–	2
Richmond	3	–	3	–	1	5	–	3	–	2
Washington and Lee	2	–	2	–	0	4	–	6	–	0
Furman	2	–	4	–	0	2	–	6	–	1
George Washington	2	–	4	–	0	4	–	6	–	0
Davidson	2	–	5	–	0	3	–	5	–	1
South Carolina	1	–	3	–	0	3	–	5	–	0
NC State	1	–	4	–	1	3	–	6	–	1
VPI	0	–	6	–	1	0	–	8	–	1
The Citadel	0	–	5	–	0	2	–	7	–	0
$ – Conference champion; Rankings from AP Poll

The 1948 Davidson Wildcats football team was an American football team that represented Davidson College during the 1948 college football season as a member of the Southern Conference. In their first year under head coach Lefty Jamerson, the team compiled an overall record of 3–5–1, with a mark of 2–5 in conference play, and finished in 12th place in the SoCon.

Davidson was ranked at No. 160 in the final Litkenhous Difference by Score System ratings for 1948.

== Schedule ==
Date	Opponent	Site	Result	Attendance	Source
September 18	Elon*	Richardson Stadium; Davidson, NC	W 25–0		
September 25	William & Mary	American Legion Memorial Stadium; Charlotte, NC	L 6–14	8,000	
October 9	at NC State	Riddick Stadium; Raleigh, NC	L 0–40	17,500	
October 16	at The Citadel	Johnson Hagood Stadium; Charleston, SC	W 14–6	10,000	
October 23	at Wofford*	Snyder Field; Spartanburg, SC	T 7–7	8,000	
October 30	at VMI	Alumni Field; Lexington, VA	L 6–33	5,000	
November 6	Richmond^{†}	Richardson Stadium; Davidson, NC	L 0–6	7,500	
November 13	Washington and Lee	Richardson Stadium; Davidson, NC	L 20–21		
November 25	Furman	American Legion Memorial Stadium; Charlotte, NC	W 7–0	8,500	
*Non-conference game; ^{†}Homecoming
