= Lindy Pearson =

American football player (1929–2011)

No. 42, 26
- Position: Halfback

Personal information
- Born: March 6, 1929; Oklahoma City, Oklahoma, U.S.
- Died: March 9, 2011 (aged 82); Oklahoma City, Oklahoma, U.S.
- Listed height: 6 ft 0 in (1.83 m)
- Listed weight: 198 lb (90 kg)

Career information
- College: Oklahoma

Career history
- Detroit Lions (1950–1952); Green Bay Packers (1952)

Career statistics
- Rushing attempts: 58
- Rushing yards: 172
- Touchdowns: 2
- Receptions: 7
- Receiving yards: 63
- Kick returns: 7
- Stats at Pro Football Reference

Lindell Eugene Pearson (March 6, 1929 – March 9, 2011) was an American football halfback who played in the National Football League (NFL). He was a member of the Detroit Lions for two seasons before splitting the 1952 NFL season between the Lions and the Green Bay Packers.
