= Wake Forest High School =

Public school in North Carolina, United States

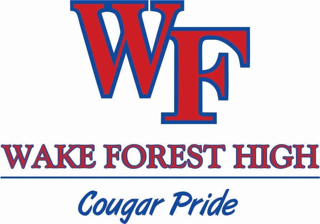

Location
- 420 West Stadium Drive; Wake Forest, North Carolina 27587; United States; 35°59′06″N 78°30′57″W

Information
- Former names: Wake Forest-Rolesville High School (1941–2013)
- Type: Public
- Founded: 1941 (85 years ago)
- School district: Wake County Public Schools
- School code: 370472001901
- CEEB code: 344115
- Principal: Melissa Thomas
- Staff: 108.57 (on an FTE basis)
- Enrollment: 2,043 (2024-2025)
- Student to teacher ratio: 18.82
- Colors: Royal blue, red, and white
- Slogan: Roll Coogs
- Athletics: NCHSAA 7A
- Athletics conference: Northern Six 6A/7A
- Team name: Cougars
- Website: Wake Forest High School

Wake Forest High School is a four-year high school (9–12) located in Wake Forest, North Carolina.

== History ==
Established in 1941 as Wake Forest-Rolesville High School, the school served the communities of Wake Forest and Rolesville. Due to growth in the area, the school was split when nearby Rolesville High School opened its doors to students in 2013.

== Demographics ==
In 2016–2017 there were just over 2,000 students attending Wake Forest High School. 59.4% of the student body was White, 23.0% was Black, 12.1% was Hispanic, 1.8% was Asian, and 3.7% was two or more races. Less than 1% of the students were Other.

== Academics ==
On the College Board SAT, the school had a participation rate of 66% with an average score of 1,024. On the North Carolina, Math I, End-of-Course Test 10.2% of the participants were at or above grade level. For Biology, the average was 65% compared to the state average of 46%. For English II, the average was 63% while the state's average was 51%.

== Athletics ==
Wake Forest High School is a member of the North Carolina High School Athletic Association (NCHSAA) and are classified as a 7A school. It is a part of the Northern Six 6A/7A Conference.

=== State Championships ===
NCHSAA State Championships
| Sport | Year(s) |
|---|---|
| Men's Basketball | 1971 (2A), 1972 (2A), 1973 (2A), 1977 (3A), 1978 (2A), 1979 (2A) |
| Football | 2016 (4AA), 2017 (4AA), 2018 (4AA) |
| Men's Soccer | 1996 (3A), 2019 (4A) |

== Notable alumni ==
- Ashlan Gorse Cousteau, journalist and ocean advocate
- Ryan Cretens, professional soccer player
- Ariana DeBose, Academy Award winning actress
- Darius Hodge, NFL outside linebacker
- Jamie Holland, NFL wide receiver
- John Jiles, NFL wide receiver
- Dexter Lawrence, NFL defensive end
- Bryce Love, NFL running back
- Brynn Rumfallo, reality TV star, dancer and model
- Alex Smalley, PGA Tour golfer
- Andrew Taylor, MLB pitcher
- Rena Wakama, basketball coach
- Eric Williams, professional basketball player
- Mac Williamson, MLB player
- Robert Yates, NASCAR engine builder and owner

== See also ==
- WCPSS
