= Groves Stadium (1940) =

Stadium in Wake Forest, North Carolina

Groves Stadium (1940–1957) Trentini Stadium (1957-current)
- Interactive map of Groves Stadium (1940–1957); Trentini Stadium (1957-current)
- Full name: Groves Stadium
- Location: Wake Forest, North Carolina, United States
- Coordinates: 35.986601°N 78.515629°W
- Owner: Wake Forest University (1940–1957); Wake Forest-Rolesville High School (1957–current)
- Operator: Wake Forest University (1940–1957); Wake Forest-Rolesville High School (1957–current)
- Capacity: 20,000 (peak)

Construction
- Opened: 1940

Tenants
- Wake Forest Demon Deacons football (1940–1956); Wake Forest-Rolesville High School (1957–current)

Groves Stadium, currently known as Trentini Stadium, is a stadium in Wake Forest, North Carolina, United States. It hosted the Wake Forest University Demon Deacons football team until the school moved to Winston-Salem, North Carolina and Bowman Gray Stadium. Since then, the stadium has hosted the homes games of Wake Forest High School. The stadium held 20,000 people at its peak and was opened in 1940. It is currently named after former Wake Forest University player and coach of Wake Forest-Rolesville High School, Tony Trentini. Wake Forest University's current home stadium was also known as Groves Stadium until 2006.
