= List of St. Bonaventure Bonnies football seasons =

This is a list of seasons completed by the St. Bonaventure Bonnies football team, also known at times at the Brown Indians and the Brown and White, formerly of the National Collegiate Athletic Association (NCAA). St. Bonaventure's first football team was fielded in 1895.

St. Bonaventure originally competed as a football independent, before competing for years as a member of the Western New York Little Three Conference with local Catholic rivals Canisius and Niagara. Football participation in the Little Three declined in the years following World War II, and, by the early 1950s, all three schools had discontinued their football programs.

== Seasons ==
NCAA Division I champions	NCAA Division I FCS champions	Conference champions	Division champions	Bowl Eligible	Undefeated Season

Year	NCAA Division	Conference	Conference Division	Overall					Conference						Coach	Final Ranking
Year	NCAA Division	Conference	Conference Division	Games	Win	Loss	Tie	Pct.	Games	Win	Loss	Tie	Pct.	Standing	Coach	Final Ranking
1895	N/A	Independent	N/A	4	4	0	0	1.000	0	0	0	0	.000	N/A	Unknown	-
1896	N/A	Independent	N/A	5	3	2	0	.600	0	0	0	0	.000	N/A	Unknown	-
1897	No team															
1898	No team															
1899	No team															
1900	No team															
1901	No team															
1902	No team															
1903	N/A	Independent	N/A	6	5	1	0	.833	0	0	0	0	.000	N/A	Jerry Delaney	-
1904	N/A	Independent	N/A	5	2	3	0	.400	0	0	0	0	.000	N/A	Jerry Delaney	-
1905	N/A	Independent	N/A	1	1	0	0	1.000	0	0	0	0	.000	N/A	William H. Burke	-
1906	N/A	Independent	N/A	2	2	0	0	1.000	0	0	0	0	.000	N/A	William H. Burke	-
1907	N/A	Independent	N/A	4	2	2	0	.500	0	0	0	0	.000	N/A	C. F. Collins	-
1908	N/A	Independent	N/A	5	3	1	1	.700	0	0	0	0	.000	N/A	T. Paul Neary	-
1909	N/A	Independent	N/A	6	4	0	2	.833	0	0	0	0	.000	N/A	T. Paul Neary	-
1910	N/A	Independent	N/A	6	1	4	1	.250	0	0	0	0	.000	N/A	T. Paul Neary	-
1911	N/A	Independent	N/A	5	3	2	0	.600	0	0	0	0	.000	N/A	D. Pickett	-
1912	N/A	Independent	N/A	2	1	1	0	.500	0	0	0	0	.000	N/A	D. Pickett	-
1913	N/A	Independent	N/A	8	4	4	0	.500	0	0	0	0	.000	N/A	D. Pickett	-
1914	N/A	Independent	N/A	6	4	2	0	.667	0	0	0	0	.000	N/A	R. Eustace	-
1915	N/A	Independent	N/A	5	0	4	1	.100	0	0	0	0	.000	N/A	Shine McLaughlin	-
1916	N/A	Independent	N/A	8	6	1	1	.813	0	0	0	0	.000	N/A	Shine McLaughlin	-
1917	N/A	Independent	N/A	5	1	4	0	.200	0	0	0	0	.000	N/A	Shine McLaughlin	-
1918	No team Due To World War I															
1919	N/A	Independent	N/A	6	1	4	1	.250	0	0	0	0	.000	N/A	Shine McLaughlin	-
1920	N/A	Independent	N/A	8	3	5	0	.375	0	0	0	0	.000	N/A	Shine McLaughlin	-
1921	N/A	Independent	N/A	10	2	5	3	.350	0	0	0	0	.000	N/A	Shine McLaughlin	-
1922	N/A	Independent	N/A	9	3	5	1	.389	0	0	0	0	.000	N/A	Alfred Carmont	-
1923	N/A	Independent	N/A	8	3	5	0	.375	0	0	0	0	.000	N/A	Alfred Carmont	-
1924	N/A	Independent	N/A	7	3	4	0	.429	0	0	0	0	.000	N/A	Glenn Carberry	-
1925	N/A	Independent	N/A	8	3	5	0	.375	0	0	0	0	.000	N/A	Glenn Carberry	-
1926	N/A	Little Three	N/A	8	3	5	0	.375	2	0	2	0	.000	N/A	Frederick V. Ostergren	-
1927	N/A	Little Three	N/A	9	4	4	1	.500	2	0	2	0	.000	N/A	Frederick V. Ostergren	-
1928	N/A	Little Three	N/A	8	3	4	1	.438	2	1	1	0	.500	N/A	Frederick V. Ostergren	-
1929	N/A	Little Three	N/A	8	3	4	1	.438	2	1	1	0	.500	N/A	Frederick V. Ostergren	-
1930	N/A	Little Three	N/A	8	3	5	0	.375	2	1	1	0	.500	N/A	Mike Reilly	-
1931	N/A	Little Three	N/A	8	4	2	2	.625	2	1	0	1	.750	N/A	Mike Reilly	-
1932	N/A	Little Three	N/A	7	4	2	1	.643	2	1	1	0	.500	N/A	Mike Reilly	-
1933	N/A	Little Three	N/A	8	4	2	2	.625	2	1	0	1	.750	N/A	Mike Reilly	-
1934	N/A	Little Three	N/A	7	2	5	0	.286	2	1	1	0	.500	N/A	Mike Reilly	-
1935	N/A	Little Three	N/A	9	6	2	1	.722	2	2	0	0	1.000	N/A	Mike Reilly	-
1936	N/A	Little Three	N/A	7	3	3	1	.500	2	1	1	0	.500	N/A	Mike Reilly	-
1937	N/A	Little Three	N/A	7	3	4	0	.429	2	1	1	0	.500	N/A	Mike Reilly	-
1938	N/A	Little Three	N/A	8	4	4	0	.500	2	0	2	0	.000	N/A	Mike Reilly	-
1939	N/A	Little Three	N/A	7	2	3	2	.429	2	0	1	1	.250	N/A	Mike Reilly	-
1940	N/A	Little Three	N/A	7	3	4	0	.429	2	0	2	0	.000	N/A	Mike Reilly	-
1941	N/A	Little Three	N/A	8	3	5	0	.375	2	1	1	0	.500	N/A	Mike Reilly	-
1942	N/A	Little Three	N/A	5	2	2	1	.500	2	0	1	1	.250	N/A	Mike Reilly	-
1943	No team Due To World War II															
1944	No team Due To World War II															
1945	No team Due To World War II															
1946	N/A	Little Three	N/A	8	6	2	0	.750	2	2	0	0	1.000	N/A	Hugh Devore	-
1947	N/A	Little Three	N/A	9	6	3	0	.667	2	1	1	0	.500	N/A	Hugh Devore	-
1948	N/A	Little Three	N/A	9	7	1	1	.833	2	1	1	0	.500	N/A	Hugh Devore	-
1949	N/A	Little Three	N/A	9	6	3	0	.667	3	2	1	0	.667	N/A	Hugh Devore	-
1950	N/A	Independent	N/A	9	7	2	0	.778	0	0	0	0	.000	N/A	Joe Bach	-
1951	N/A	Independent	N/A	9	5	4	0	.556	0	0	0	0	.000	N/A	Joe Bach	-
1952	No team															
1953	No team															
1954	No team															
1955	No team															
1956	No team															
1957	No team															
1958	No team															
1959	No team															
1960	No team															
1961	No team															
1962	No team															
1963	No team															
1964	No team															
1965	No team															
1966	No team															
1967	No team															
1968	N/A	Independent	N/A	7	2	4	1	.357	0	0	0	0	.000	N/A	Matt Conte	-
1969	N/A	Independent	N/A	7	1	6	0	.143	0	0	0	0	.000	N/A	Matt Conte	-
1970	N/A	Independent	N/A	9	1	8	0	.111	0	0	0	0	.000	N/A	Matt Conte	-
	Totals			344	161	157	26	.506	43	18	21	4	.465			
