= List of Canisius Golden Griffins football seasons =

This is a list of seasons completed by the Canisius Golden Griffins football team formerly of the National Collegiate Athletic Association (NCAA) Division I-AA. Canisius' first football team was fielded in 1918.

Canisius originally competed as a football independent, before competing for years as a member of the Western New York Little Three Conference with local Catholic rivals Niagara and St. Bonaventure. The team moved to Division III in the 1970s, before joining the I-AA's Metro Atlantic Athletic Conference in 1993. At the conclusion of the 2002 season, the Canisius football program was discontinued, along with seven other school athletic programs, as part of an effort to overhaul and streamline the school's athletic department.

== Seasons ==
NCAA Division I champions	NCAA Division I FCS champions	Conference champions	Division champions	Bowl eligible	Undefeated season

Year	NCAA Division	Conference	Conference Division	Overall					Conference						Coach	Final Ranking
Year	NCAA Division	Conference	Conference Division	Games	Win	Loss	Tie	Pct.	Games	Win	Loss	Tie	Pct.	Standing	Coach	Final Ranking
1918	N/A	Independent	N/A	6	1	5	0	.167	0	0	0	0	.000	N/A	No coach	-
1919	N/A	Independent	N/A	4	1	3	0	.250	0	0	0	0	.000	N/A	Herman Bleich	-
1920	N/A	Independent	N/A	7	3	3	1	.500	0	0	0	0	.000	N/A	Herman Bleich	-
1921	N/A	Independent	N/A	8	4	3	2	.625	0	0	0	0	.000	N/A	Luke Urban	-
1922	N/A	Independent	N/A	8	5	2	1	.688	0	0	0	0	.000	N/A	Luke Urban	-
1923	N/A	Independent	N/A	9	8	1	0	.889	0	0	0	0	.000	N/A	Luke Urban	-
1924	N/A	Independent	N/A	7	4	3	0	.571	0	0	0	0	.000	N/A	Luke Urban	-
1925	N/A	Independent	N/A	8	4	4	0	.500	0	0	0	0	.000	N/A	Luke Urban	-
1926	N/A	Little Three	N/A	8	2	5	1	.313	2	1	1	0	.500	N/A	Luke Urban	-
1927	N/A	Little Three	N/A	8	7	1	0	.875	1	1	0	0	1.000	N/A	Luke Urban	-
1928	N/A	Little Three	N/A	7	5	1	1	.786	1	1	0	0	1.000	N/A	Luke Urban	-
1929	N/A	Little Three	N/A	8	3	4	1	.438	1	0	1	0	.000	N/A	Luke Urban	-
1930	N/A	Little Three	N/A	8	4	3	1	.563	1	0	1	0	.000	N/A	Luke Urban	-
1931	N/A	Little Three	N/A	8	1	5	2	.250	2	0	1	1	.250	N/A	Eugene Oberst	-
1932	N/A	Little Three	N/A	8	1	5	2	.250	2	0	2	0	.000	N/A	Eugene Oberst / Mike Traynor	-
1933	N/A	Little Three	N/A	8	6	1	1	.813	2	0	1	1	.250	N/A	William Joy	-
1934	N/A	Little Three	N/A	6	4	2	0	.667	2	2	0	0	1.000	N/A	William Joy	-
1935	N/A	Little Three	N/A	7	3	3	1	.500	2	1	1	0	.500	N/A	William Joy	-
1936	N/A	Little Three	N/A	8	7	1	0	.875	2	2	0	0	1.000	N/A	William Joy	-
1937	N/A	Little Three	N/A	9	4	4	1	.500	2	1	1	0	.500	N/A	William Joy	-
1938	N/A	Little Three	N/A	8	2	6	0	.250	2	1	1	0	.500	N/A	William Joy	-
1939	N/A	Little Three	N/A	6	4	1	1	.750	2	2	0	0	1.000	N/A	James B. Wilson	-
1940	N/A	Little Three	N/A	8	5	3	0	.625	2	1	1	0	.500	N/A	James B. Wilson	-
1941	N/A	Little Three	N/A	8	3	4	1	.438	2	1	1	0	.500	N/A	James B. Wilson	-
1942	N/A	Little Three	N/A	8	4	3	1	.563	2	1	0	1	.750	N/A	James B. Wilson	-
1943	No team Due To World War II															
1944	No team Due To World War II															
1945	No team Due To World War II															
1946	N/A	Little Three	N/A	8	4	3	1	.563	2	1	1	0	.500	N/A	Earl Brown	-
1947	N/A	Little Three	N/A	9	7	2	0	.778	2	2	0	0	1.000	N/A	Earl Brown	-
1948	N/A	Little Three	N/A	10	7	2	1	.750	2	2	0	0	1.000	N/A	James B. Wilson	-
1949	N/A	Little Three	N/A	7	5	2	0	.714	3	2	1	0	.667	N/A	James B. Wilson	-
1950	No team															
1951	No team															
1952	No team															
1953	No team															
1954	No team															
1955	No team															
1956	No team															
1957	No team															
1958	No team															
1959	No team															
1960	No team															
1961	No team															
1962	No team															
1963	No team															
1964	No team															
1965	No team															
1966	No team															
1967	N/A	Independent	N/A	3	0	3	0	.000	0	0	0	0	.000	N/A	Unknown	-
1968	N/A	Independent	N/A	1	1	0	0	1.000	0	0	0	0	.000	N/A	Unknown	-
1969	N/A	Independent	N/A	2	2	0	0	1.000	0	0	0	0	.000	N/A	Unknown	-
1970	N/A	Independent	N/A	3	2	1	0	.667	0	0	0	0	.000	N/A	Unknown	-
1971	N/A	Independent	N/A	4	2	1	1	.625	0	0	0	0	.000	N/A	Unknown	-
1972	N/A	Independent	N/A	6	4	2	0	.667	0	0	0	0	.000	N/A	Unknown	-
1973	III	Division III Independent	N/A	4	0	4	0	.000	0	0	0	0	.000	N/A	Unknown	-
1974	III	Division III Independent	N/A	4	2	2	0	.500	0	0	0	0	.000	N/A	Unknown	-
1975	III	Division III Independent	N/A	9	5	4	0	.556	0	0	0	0	.000	N/A	Bill Brooks	-
1976	III	Division III Independent	N/A	9	4	5	0	.444	0	0	0	0	.000	N/A	Bill Brooks	-
1977	III	Division III Independent	N/A	9	5	2	2	.667	0	0	0	0	.000	N/A	Bill Brooks	-
1978	III	Division III Independent	N/A	9	4	5	0	.444	0	0	0	0	.000	N/A	Bill Brooks	-
1979	III	Division III Independent	N/A	9	5	4	0	.556	0	0	0	0	.000	N/A	Bill Brooks	-
1980	III	Division III Independent	N/A	10	6	4	0	.600	0	0	0	0	.000	N/A	Bill Brooks	-
1981	III	Division III Independent	N/A	10	4	6	0	.400	0	0	0	0	.000	N/A	Bill Brooks	-
1982	III	Division III Independent	N/A	9	6	3	0	.667	0	0	0	0	.000	N/A	Tom Hersey	-
1983	III	Division III Independent	N/A	9	5	4	0	.556	0	0	0	0	.000	N/A	Tom Hersey	-
1984	III	Division III Independent	N/A	10	2	8	0	.200	0	0	0	0	.000	N/A	Tom Hersey	-
1985	III	Division III Independent	N/A	9	6	2	1	.722	0	0	0	0	.000	N/A	Tom Hersey	-
1986	III	Division III Independent	N/A	9	5	4	0	.556	0	0	0	0	.000	N/A	Tom Hersey	-
1987	III	Division III Independent	N/A	10	6	3	1	.650	0	0	0	0	.000	N/A	Tom Hersey	-
1988	III	Division III Independent	N/A	9	6	3	0	.667	0	0	0	0	.000	N/A	Tom Hersey	-
1989	III	Division III Independent	N/A	9	5	4	0	.556	0	0	0	0	.000	N/A	Tom Hersey	-
1990	III	Division III Independent	N/A	10	6	4	0	.600	0	0	0	0	.000	N/A	Tom Hersey	-
1991	III	Division III Independent	N/A	9	2	7	0	.222	0	0	0	0	.000	N/A	Tom Hersey	-
1992	III	Division III Independent	N/A	10	3	6	1	.350	0	0	0	0	.000	N/A	Barry Mynter	-
1993	I-AA	MAAC	N/A	10	5	5	0	.500	5	4	1	0	.800	N/A	Barry Mynter	-
1994	I-AA	MAAC	N/A	10	2	8	0	.200	7	2	5	0	.286	N/A	Barry Mynter	-
1995	I-AA	MAAC	N/A	10	4	6	0	.400	7	4	3	0	.571	N/A	Chuck Williams	-
1996	I-AA	MAAC	N/A	9	5	4	0	.556	8	4	4	0	.500	N/A	Chuck Williams	-
1997	I-AA	MAAC	N/A	10	3	7	0	.300	8	2	6	0	.250	N/A	Chuck Williams	-
1998	I-AA	MAAC	N/A	10	3	7	0	.300	7	2	5	0	.286	N/A	Chuck Williams	-
1999	I-AA	MAAC	N/A	11	1	10	0	.091	8	0	8	0	.000	N/A	Chuck Williams	-
2000	I-AA	MAAC	N/A	10	0	10	0	.000	7	0	7	0	.000	N/A	Ed Argast	-
2001	I-AA	MAAC	N/A	10	1	9	0	.100	7	1	6	0	.143	N/A	Ed Argast	-
2002	I-AA	MAAC	N/A	11	2	9	0	.182	7	2	5	0	.286	N/A	Ed Argast	-
	Totals			518	241	251	26	.490	71	21	50	0	.296			
