= 1926 Buffalo Bisons football team =

American college football season

1926 Buffalo Bisons football
- Conference: New York State Conference
- Record: 0–8 (0–5 New York State)
- Head coach: Russ Carrick (3rd season)
- Home stadium: Rotary Field

1926 New York State Conference football standings
	Conf.					Overall
Team	W		L		T	W		L		T
Niagara $	2	–	0	–	1	4	–	3	–	1
Hobart	4	–	1	–	0	6	–	3	–	0
Clarkson	3	–	1	–	1	4	–	3	–	1
St. Lawrence	2	–	1	–	0	4	–	2	–	1
Rochester	2	–	2	–	1	3	–	5	–	1
St. Bonaventure	1	–	1	–	0	3	–	5	–	0
Hamilton	1	–	1	–	0	2	–	6	–	0
Alfred	1	–	4	–	1	1	–	6	–	2
Buffalo	0	–	5	–	0	0	–	8	–	0
$ – Conference champion

The 1926 Buffalo Bisons football team represented the University of Buffalo as a member of the New York State Conference during the 1926 college football season. Led by Russ Carrick in his third season as head coach, the team compiled an overall record of 0–8 with a mark of 0–5 in conference play, placing last out of nine teams.

== Schedule ==
Date	Opponent	Site	Result
October 2	at Westminster (PA)*	New Wilmington, PA	L 0–38
October 9	Niagara	Rotary Field; Buffalo, NY	L 0–60
October 16	Clarkson	Rotary Field; Buffalo, NY	L 2–20
October 23	Alfred	Rotary Field; Buffalo, NY	L 0–6
October 30	Rochester	Rotary Field; Buffalo, NY	L 0–32
November 6	Buffalo alumni*	Rotary Field; Buffalo, NY	L 4–6
November 13	Hobart	Rotary Field; Buffalo, NY	L 13–42
November 20	at Toledo*	Toledo, OH	L 7–33
*Non-conference game
