= 1949 St. Bonaventure Bonnies football team =

American college football season

1949 St. Bonaventure Bonnies football
- Conference: Western New York Little Three Conference
- Record: 6–3 (2–1 Little Three)
- Head coach: Hugh Devore (4th season)
- Home stadium: Forness Stadium

The 1949 St. Bonaventure Bonnies football team, sometimes also referred to as the St. Bonaventure Brown Indians, was an American football team that represented St. Bonaventure University during the 1949 college football season. In its fourth and final season under head coach Hugh Devore, the team compiled a 6–3 record and outscored opponents by a total of 211 to 110. The team played its home games at Forness Stadium in Olean, New York.

== Schedule ==
Date	Opponent	Site	Result	Attendance	Source
September 18	Scranton*	Forness Stadium; Olean, NY	W 26–0		
September 25	at San Francisco*	Kezar Stadium; San Francisco, CA	L 21–34		
October 2	at Dayton*	Dayton, OH	L 13–28	12,000	
October 8	Wayne*	Forness Stadium; Olean, NY	W 25–7		
October 16	Canisius	Forness Stadium; Olean, NY	W 46–13	12,000	
October 23	at Niagara	Varsity Stadium; Niagara Falls, NY	W 41–0	6,500	
October 30	at Canisius	Civic Stadium; Buffalo, NY	L 0–14	12,000	
November 5	Houston*	Forness Stadium; Olean, NY	W 20–14	5,000	
November 19	at Boston University*	Fenway Park; Boston, MA	W 19–0	16,657	
*Non-conference game
