= Pete Dwyer =

American sports coach and college athletics administrator

Biographical details
- Education: Notre Dame (1910)

Playing career

Football
- 1907–1909: Notre Dame
- Position: Halfback

Coaching career (HC unless noted)

Football
- 1923–1928: Niagara
- 1929–1930: Syracuse (assistant)
- 1931–1942: Clarkson

Basketball
- 1923–1927: Niagara
- 1930–1936: Clarkson

Baseball
- c. 1925: Niagara

Head coaching record
- Overall: 70–42–7 (football); 99–82 (basketball)

Accomplishments and honors

Championships
- Football; 3 New York State Conference (1926–1928); 2 Western New York Little Three (1926–1927)

Peter Dwyer was an American football, basketball, and baseball coach and college athletics administrator. He served as the head football coach and head basketball coach at Niagara University from 1923 to 1927. After working as an assistant coach at Syracuse University, Dwyer became the head football coach and head basketball coach at Clarkson University in Potsdam, New York. He was a 1910 graduate of the University of Notre Dame, where he played left halfback on the school's football team.

Dwyer was the Niagara head coach during the notorious 1923 Niagara vs. Colgate football game in which his players refused to tackle Colgate players unless they agreed to play a shortened game with 8-minute quarters.

== Head coaching record ==
=== Football ===
Year	Team	Overall	Conference	Standing	Bowl/playoffs
Niagara Purple Eagles (Western New York Little Three Conference) (1923–1925)
1923	Niagara	4–4			
1924	Niagara	4–4			
1925	Niagara	4–4			
Niagara Purple Eagles (New York State Conference / Western New York Little Three Conference) (1926–1928)
1926	Niagara	4–3–1	2–0–1 / 2–0	1st / 1st	
1927	Niagara	5–3	1–0	1st	
1928	Niagara	4–4	4–0	1st	
Niagara:		25–22–1			
Clarkson Golden Knights (Independent) (1931–1943)
1931	Clarkson	5–3			
1932	Clarkson	6–2			
1933	Clarkson	4–3–1			
1934	Clarkson	3–3			
1935	Clarkson	5–1–1			
1936	Clarkson	3–3–2			
1937	Clarkson	2–5			
1938	Clarkson	2–4–1			
1939	Clarkson	5–2			
1940	Clarkson	5–3			
1941	Clarkson	5–1–1			
Clarkson:		45–30–6			
Total:		70–42–7			
National championship Conference title Conference division title or championship game berth
