= 1928 Buffalo Bisons football team =

American college football season

1928 Buffalo Bisons football
- Conference: New York State Conference
- Record: 1–6 (0–5 New York State)
- Head coach: Russ Carrick (5th season)
- Home stadium: Rotary Field

1928 New York State Conference football standings
	Conf.					Overall
Team	W		L		T	W		L		T
Niagara $	4	–	0	–	0	4	–	4	–	0
Rochester	3	–	0	–	1	5	–	2	–	1
Hamilton	2	–	0	–	1	5	–	2	–	1
Hobart	3	–	1	–	0	5	–	4	–	0
St. Lawrence	2	–	1	–	0	3	–	3	–	0
Alfred	1	–	4	–	0	2	–	7	–	0
Clarkson	1	–	5	–	0	1	–	7	–	0
Buffalo	0	–	5	–	0	1	–	6	–	0
$ – Conference champion

The 1928 Buffalo Bisons football team represented the University of Buffalo as a member of the New York State Conference during the 1928 college football season. Led by Russ Carrick in his fifth and final season as head coach, the team compiled an overall record of 1–6 with a mark of 0–5 in conference play, placing last out of eight team in the New York State Conference.

== Schedule ==
Date	Opponent	Site	Result	Source
October 6	Edinboro*	Rotary Field; Buffalo, NY	L 0–35	
October 13	Niagara	Rotary Field; Buffalo, NY	L 0–38	
October 20	at Clarkson	Potsdam, NY	L 6–19	
October 27	at Rochester	Rochester, NY	L 0–36	
November 3	at St. Lawrence	Canton, NY	L 0–12	
November 10	Long Island*	Rotary Field; Buffalo, NY	W 13–0	
November 17	Hobart	Rotary Field; Buffalo, NY	L 0–38	
*Non-conference game
