= 1927 Buffalo Bisons football team =

American college football season

1927 Buffalo Bisons football
- Conference: New York State Conference
- Record: 0–6–1 (0–5–1 New York State)
- Head coach: Russ Carrick (4th season)
- Home stadium: Rotary Field

The 1927 Buffalo Bisons football team represented the University of Buffalo as a member of the New York State Conference during the 1927 college football season. Led by Rus Carrick in his fourth season as head coach, the team compiled an overall record of 0–6–1 with a mark of 0–5–1 in conference play.

== Schedule ==
Date	Opponent	Site	Result
October 1	Westminster (PA)*	Rotary Field; Buffalo, NY	L 0–43
October 8	Niagara	Rotary Field; Buffalo, NY	L 0–34
October 15	Clarkson	Rotary Field; Buffalo, NY	L 0–19
October 22	Rochester	Rotary Field; Buffalo, NY	L 0–47
October 29	St. Lawrence	Rotary Field; Buffalo, NY	L 7–20
November 12	at Hobart	Boswell Field; Geneva, NY	L 0–49
November 18	Alfred	Rotary Field; Buffalo, NY	T 0–0
*Non-conference game
