= 1947 St. Bonaventure Bonnies football team =

American college football season

1947 St. Bonaventure Bonnies football
- Conference: Western New York Little Three Conference
- Record: 6–3 (1–1 Little Three)
- Head coach: Hugh Devore (2nd season)
- Home stadium: Forness Stadium

The 1947 St. Bonaventure Bonnies football team, sometimes also referred to as the St. Bonaventure Brown Indians, was an American football team that represented St. Bonaventure University during the 1947 college football season. In its second season under head coach Hugh Devore, the team compiled a 6–3 record and outscored opponents by a total of 174 to 84.

St. Bonaventure was ranked at No. 88 (out of 500 college football teams) in the final Litkenhous Ratings for 1947.

The team played its home games at Forness Stadium in Olean, New York.

== Schedule ==
| Date | Opponent | Site | Result | Attendance | Source |
|---|---|---|---|---|---|
| September 21 | Saint Vincent* | Forness Stadium; Olean, NY | W 21–0 | | |
| October 4 | at Cincinnati* | Nippert Stadium; Cincinnati, OH | L 14–20 | 19,000 | |
| October 11 | Merchant Marine* | Forness Stadium; Olean, NY | W 25–0 | 6,500 | |
| October 19 | at Canisius | Civic Stadium; Buffalo, NY | L 14–17 | 19,504 | |
| October 26 | Saint Louis* | Forness Stadium; Olean, NY | W 47–13 | 9,200 | |
| November 2 | at Niagara | Civic Stadium; Buffalo, NY | W 13–6 | 7,189 | |
| November 8 | Bowling Green* | Forness Stadium; Olean, NY | W 21–14 | 6,500 | |
| November 16 | Scranton* | Forness Stadium; Olean, NY | W 13–7 | 9,000 | |
| November 22 | Dayton* | Dayton Stadium; Dayton, OH | L 6–7 | | |
*Non-conference game
