= 1933 Canisius Griffins football team =

American college football season

1933 Canisius Griffins football
- Conference: Western New York Little Three Conference
- Record: 6–1–1 (0–1–1 Little Three)
- Head coach: William Joy (1st season)
- Captain: Hank Turgeon
- Home stadium: Canisius Villa

The 1933 Canisius Griffins football team was an American football team that represented Canisius College in the Western New York Little Three Conference (Little Three) during the 1933 college football season. Canisius compiled a 6–1–1 record (0–1–1 in the Little Three), shut out six of eight opponents, and outscored all opponents by a total of 210 to 35. William "Hiker" Joy was the head coach for the first year. Quarterback Hank Turgeon was the team captain.

== Schedule ==
Date	Opponent	Site	Result	Attendance	Source
September 23	Albion*	Buffalo, NY	W 39–0		
October 1	Baltimore*	Buffalo, NY	W 34–0	1,000	
October 7	Georgetown*	Buffalo, NY	W 6–0		
October 21	at Saint Vincent*	Latrobe, PA	W 59–20		
October 29	Brooklyn*	Buffalo, NY	W 54–0		
November 4	St. Bonaventure	Canisius Villa; Buffalo, NY	L 6–15	11,000	
November 11	at Niagara	Niagara Falls, NY	T 0–0		
November 19	Dayton*	Buffalo, NY	W 12–0		
*Non-conference game
