= 1936 Canisius Griffins football team =

American college football season

1936 Canisius Griffins football

Little Three champion
- Conference: Western New York Little Three Conference
- Record: 7–1 (2–0 Little Three)
- Head coach: William Joy (4th season)
- Captain: Joe Szur

The 1936 Canisius Griffins football team was an American football team that represented Canisius College in the Western New York Little Three Conference (Little Three) during the 1936 college football season. Canisius compiled a 7–1 record, shut out five of eight opponents, won the Little Three championship, and outscored all opponents by a total of 199 to 27. William "Hiker" Joy was the head coach for the fourth year. Halfback Joe Szur was the team captain.

== Schedule ==
Date	Opponent	Site	Result	Attendance	Source
September 27	Assumption (ON)*	Buffalo, NY	W 56–0		
October 4	La Salle*	Buffalo, NY	L 14–19		
October 11	St. Thomas (PA)*	Buffalo, NY	W 20–0	6,500	
October 18	Saint Vincent*	Buffalo, NY	W 19–0		
October 25	Brooklyn*	Buffalo, NY	W 58–0		
November 1	St. Bonaventure	Buffalo, NY	W 13–0		
November 7	at Cortland*	Cortland, NY	W 13–6		
November 15	Niagara	Buffalo, NY	W 6–2	10,000	
*Non-conference game
