= Frederick V. Ostergren =

American sports coach

Fred Ostergren
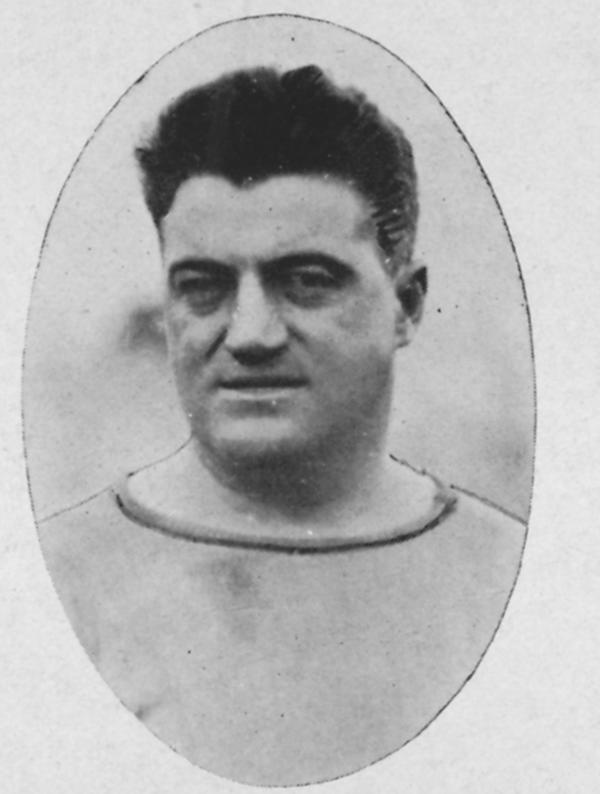

Biographical details
- Born: c. 1886
- Died: July 4, 1945

Playing career

Football
- 1910–1913: Holy Cross

Baseball
- 1911–1914: Holy Cross

Coaching career (HC unless noted)

Football
- 1921: Western Reserve
- 1921–1924: Bowdoin
- 1926–1929: St. Bonaventure

Basketball
- 1927–1928: St. Bonaventure

Baseball
- 1920–1922: Western Reserve
- 1926–1930: St. Bonaventure

Head coaching record
- Overall: 27–28–8 (football)

Accomplishments and honors

Championships
- 1 MIAA (1921)

Frederick V. Ostergren (c. 1886 – July 4, 1945) was an American football, basketball, and baseball coach.

Fred attended high school at the old Roxbury High School in Boston, Massachusetts, where he was a star fullback and outstanding first baseman. He played both college football and baseball at Holy Cross in Worcester, Massachusetts. He played professional baseball in the Boston Red Sox farm system for the Manchester Textiles (also known as the Fitchburg Burghers) in 1914 and the Lawrence Barristers in 1915 and 1916.

Collegiately, Ostegren coached at St. Bonaventure, Bowdoin, and Western Reserve. He also coached at Portland and Deering high schools in Maine and at Malden, Mass.

Ostergren began coaching at Arlington High School in 1931.

== Legacy ==
The Touchdown Club of Arlington annually gives the Ostergren Award for the outstanding athlete-scholar, male and female, of Arlington High School.

== Head coaching record ==
=== College football ===
Year	Team	Overall	Conference	Standing	Bowl/playoffs
Western Reserve Pioneers (Ohio Athletic Conference) (1921)
1921	Western Reserve	0–1–1	0–1–1		
Western Reserve:		0–1–1	0–1–1		
BowdoinPolar Bears (Maine Intercollegiate Athletic Association) (1921–1924)
1921	Bowdoin	5–0–1			
1922	Bowdoin	2–4–1			
1923	Bowdoin	3–3–1			
1924	Bowdoin	4–3–1			
Bowdoin:		14–10–4			
St. Bonaventure Brown and White (New York State Conference / Western New York Little Three Conference) (1926–1929)
1926	St. Bonaventure	3–5	1–1 /	T–5th /	
1927	St. Bonaventure	4–4–1			
St. Bonaventure Brown Indians (Western New York Little Three Conference) (1928–1929)
1928	St. Bonaventure	3–4–1			
1929	St. Bonaventure	3–4–1			
St. Bonaventure:		13–17–3			
Total:		27–28–8			
National championship Conference title Conference division title or championship game berth
