= 1940 Niagara Purple Eagles football team =

American college football season

1940 Niagara Purple Eagles football

Little Three champion
- Conference: Western New York Little Three Conference
- Record: 6–1–1 (2–0 Little Three)
- Head coach: Joe Bach (4th season)

The 1940 Niagara Purple Eagles football team was an American football team that represented Niagara University in the Western New York Little Three Conference (Little Three) during the 1940 college football season. Niagara compiled a 6–1–1 record (2–0 in the Little Three), won the Little Three championship, and outscored opponents by a total of 102 to 31. Joe Bach was the head coach for the fourth year.

Niagara was ranked at No. 155 (out of 697 college football teams) in the final rankings under the Litkenhous Difference by Score system for 1940.

== Schedule ==
Date	Opponent	Site	Result	Attendance	Source
September 22	La Salle*	Niagara Falls, NY	W 21–6		
September 29	at Saint Vincent*	Bearcat Stadium; Latrobe, PA	L 0–6	6,500	
October 6	Canisius	Niagara Falls, NY	W 26–7		
October 13	Providence*	Niagara Falls, NY	W 14–0		
October 20	vs. St. Bonaventure	Buffalo, NY	W 20–0		
November 2	at Detroit Tech*	Robinson Field; Detroit, MI	W 7–6		
November 9	Waynesburg*	Niagara Falls, NY	W 14–6		
November 17	Scranton*	Niagara Falls, NY	T 0–0		
*Non-conference game
