= James Moran Sr. =

American football player and coach (1912–1983)

Jim Moran
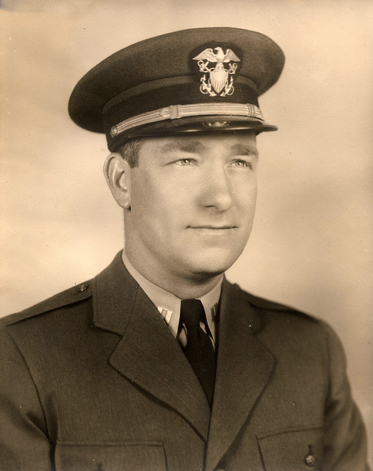
- Moran as a lieutenant in the Navy

Biographical details
- Born: September 27, 1912; Boston, Massachusetts, U.S.
- Died: August 18, 1983 (aged 70); Natick, Massachusetts, U.S.

Playing career
- 1932–1934: Holy Cross
- 1935–1936: Boston Redskins
- Position: Guard

Coaching career (HC unless noted)
- 1943: South Carolina
- 1946–1948: Niagara
- 1949: Holy Cross (line)

Head coaching record
- Overall: 15–17–2

James Patrick Moran (September 27, 1912 – August 18, 1983) was an American football player and coach. A standout guard in high school and college, he played professionally for a total of 17 games with the Boston Redskins of the National Football League (NFL) in 1935 and 1936. While stationed there with the Navy during World War II, Moran was head football coach at the University of South Carolina for the 1943 season. Later, he was head coach at Niagara University from 1946 to 1948, compiling a career college football coaching record of 15–17–2.

== Early life and education ==
Moran was born on September 27, 1912, in the South Boston neighborhood of Boston, Massachusetts. He was the third child of Irish immigrants John Francis Xavier Moran and Agnes Moran (née Dowd). The two met on a ship, immigrating to the United States. He attended Boston College High School, an all-male Jesuit secondary school.

== Football career ==
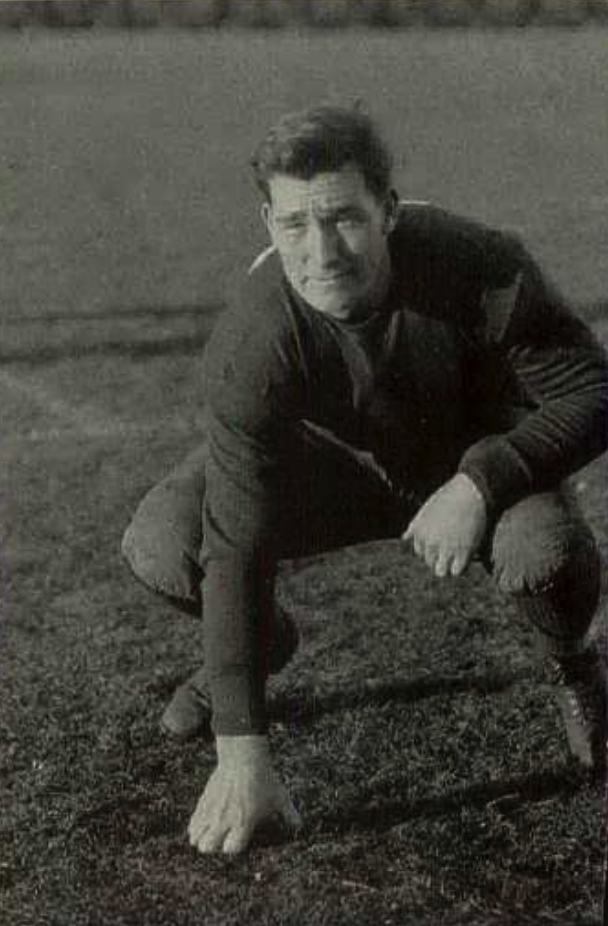
Moran at Holy Cross in 1934

=== Holy Cross ===
Moran entered the College of the Holy Cross in 1931 and played college football there. He was a three-year starter for the team; during those three years, it had a 21–6–2 record. Moran earned All East and All American honors. He graduated in 1935 and was inducted into the Holy Cross Athletic Hall of Fame in 1982.

=== South Carolina ===
On September 2, 1943, Moran was hired to serve as the head coach of the South Carolina Gamecocks football program. The position opened up when his predecessor, Rex Enright, resigned in order to accept a Navy commission. During his one season with the Gamecocks, the team won five games and lost two.

=== Niagara ===
Moran was the head football coach at Niagara University from 1946 to 1946. His team employed a T formation offense and compiled a record of 10–15–2 in three seasons. Moran resigned from his post at Niagara in February 1949 to become line coach at his alma mater, Holy Cross.

== Later life and family ==
Moran married the former Dorothy Dwyer; the couple had seven children. His eldest son, James P. Moran Jr., born in 1945, represented the 8th congressional district of Virginia from 1991 to 2015. His youngest son, Brian J. Moran, born in 1959, was a member of the Virginia House of Delegates from 1996 until 2008 and was a candidate for Governor of Virginia in the 2009 elections, losing in the Democratic primary.

Outside of his football career, Moran worked as a sales representative and probation officer. He died in 1983.

== Head coaching record ==
Year	Team	Overall	Conference	Standing	Bowl/playoffs
South Carolina Gamecocks (Southern Conference) (1943)
1943	South Carolina	5–2	2–1	3rd	
South Carolina:		5–2	2–1		
Niagara Purple Eagles (Western New York Little Three Conference) (1946–1948)
1946	Niagara	6–2	0–2	3rd	
1947	Niagara	2–7–1	0–2	3rd	
1948	Niagara	2–6–1	0–2	3rd	
Niagara:		10–15–2	0–6		
Total:		15–17–2			
