= Russ Carrick =

American football player and coach (1889–1955)

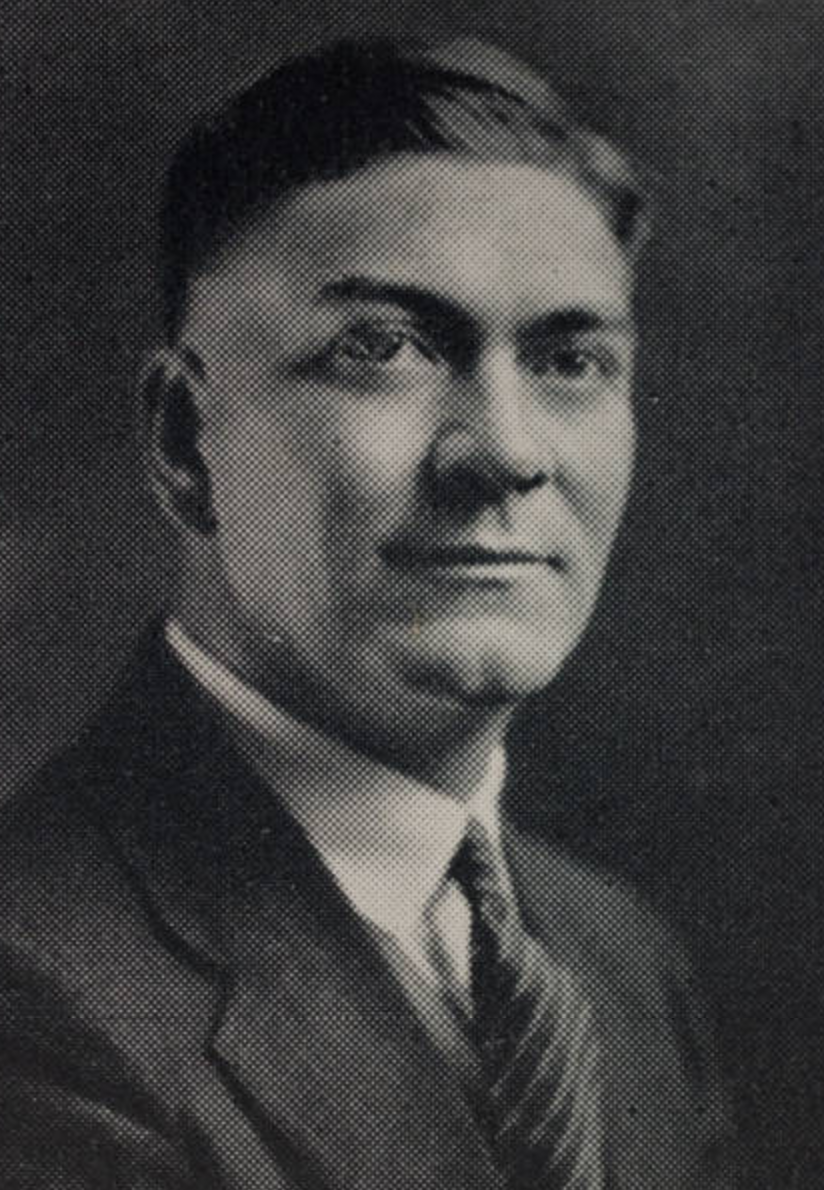

Biographical details
- Born: August 6, 1889; Buffalo, New York, U.S.
- Died: September 13, 1955 (aged 66); Buffalo, New York, U.S.

Playing career
- 1910–1911: Colgate
- Position: End

Coaching career (HC unless noted)
- 1914–?: Lafayette HS (NY)
- 1924–1928: Buffalo

Head coaching record
- Overall: 5–31–2 (college)

Caleb Russell Carrick (August 6, 1889 – September 13, 1955) was an American football player and coach. He served as the head football coach at the University of Buffalo from 1924 to 1928, compiling a record of 5–31–2.

A native of Buffalo, New York, Carrick attended Buffalo's Lafayette High School. He played college football as an end at Colgate University. After graduarting from Colgate in 1914, Carrick coached football at Lafayette High School. He later worked as an insurance officer in Buffalo and New York City. Carrick died on September 13, 1955, at Buffalo General Hospital in Buffalo.

== Head coaching record ==
=== College ===
Year	Team	Overall	Conference	Standing	Bowl/playoffs
Buffalo Bisons (Independent) (1924–1925)
1924	Buffalo	1–7			
1925	Buffalo	3–4–1			
Buffalo Bisons (New York State Conference) (1926–1928)
1926	Buffalo	0–8	0–5	9th	
1927	Buffalo	0–6–1	0–5–1		
1928	Buffalo	1–6	0–5	8th	
Buffalo:		5–31–2	0–15–1		
Total:		5–31–2			
