= 1946 Western New York Little Three Conference football season =

- Sport: Football
- Number of teams: 3
- Champion: St. Bonaventure

Football seasons
- ← 1945 1947 →

1946 Western New York Little Three Conference football standings
	Conf.					Overall
Team	W		L		T	W		L		T
St. Bonaventure $	6	–	2	–	0	2	–	0	–	0
Canisius	4	–	3	–	1	1	–	1	–	0
Niagara	6	–	2	–	0	0	–	2	–	0
$ – Conference champion

The 1946 Western New York Little Three Conference football season was the season of college football played by the three member schools of the Western New York Little Three Conference (Little Three) as part of the 1946 college football season.

The St. Bonaventure Bonnies won the Little Three championship with a 6–2 record and outscored opponents by a total of 179 to 69.

== Conference overview ==
Conf. rank	Team	Head coach	Conf. record	Overall record	Points scored	Points against
1	St. Bonaventure	Hugh Devore	2–0	6–1	154	43
2	Canisius	Earl Brown	1–1	4–3–1	148	58
3	Niagara	James Moran Sr.	0–2	6–2	151	55

== Teams ==
=== St. Bonaventure ===
1946 St. Bonaventure Bonnies football

Little Three champion

Tobacco Bowl, L 25–26 vs. Muhlenberg
- Conference: Western New York Little Three Conference
- Record: 6–2 (2–0 Little Three)
- Head coach: Hugh Devore (1st season)
- Home stadium: Forness Stadium

The 1946 St. Bonaventure Bonnies football team, sometimes referred to as the St. Bonaventure Brown Indians, represented St. Bonaventure University. The team compiled a 6–1 record in the regular season, lost to Muhlenberg in the inaugural Tobacco Bowl, and outscored all opponents by a total of 179 to 69. The 1946 season marked St. Bonaventure's return to intercollegiate football after a three-year hiatus during World War II.

The team was led by first-year head coach Hugh Devore. Devore led the 1945 Notre Dame Fighting Irish football team to a 7–2–1 record before moving on to St. Bonaventure.

St. Bonaventure was ranked at No. 88 in the final Litkenhous Difference by Score System rankings for 1946.

The team played home games at the newly-constructed Forness Stadium in Olean, New York. The dedication of the new stadium was held on September 28 during a game against Youngstown.

Two St. Bonaventure players were selected in the 1947 NFL draft held on December 16, 1946. They were back Hugo Marcolini (16th round, 137th pick, by the Boston Yanks) and Steve Cipot (23rd round, 206th pick, by the Detroit Lions).

Date	Opponent	Site	Result	Attendance	Source
September 28	Youngstown*	Forness Stadium; Olean, NY	L 14–20		
October 5	at Scranton*	Scranton Baseball Stadium; Scranton, PA	W 33–7		
October 13	at Niagara	Buffalo, NY	W 29–7		
October 26	Saint Vincent*	Forness Stadium; Olean, NY	W 26–0	8,000	
November 3	at Canisius	Buffalo, NY	W 13–0	35,089	
November 9	Bowling Green*	Forness Stadium; Olean, NY	W 13–9		
November 16	at Merchant Marine*	Kings Point, NY	W 26–0		
December 14	vs. Muhlenberg*	Stoll Field; Lexington, KY (Tobacco Bowl)	L 25–26	3,000	
*Non-conference game

=== Canisius ===
1946 Canisius Golden Griffins football
- Conference: Western New York Little Three Conference
- Record: 4–3–1 (1–1 Little Three)
- Head coach: Earl Brown (1st season)

The 1946 Canisius Golden Griffins football team represented Canisius College in Buffalo, New York. In their first year under head coach Earl Brown, the Golden Griffins compiled a 4–3–1 record, finished in second place in the Little Three, and outscored opponents by a total of 148 to 58.

Date	Opponent	Site	Result	Attendance	Source
September 20	Western Ontario	Buffalo, NY	W 34–3		
September 28	at Brown	Brown Stadium; Providence, RI	L 7–14	12,716	
	St. Mary's		W 31–0		
	Alliance		W 42–0		
	Niagara		W 14–2		
October 25	Bowling Green	Civic Stadium; Buffalo, NY	L 7–13		
November 3	St. Bonaventure	Buffalo, NY	L 0–13	35,089	
	Scranton		T 13–13		

=== Niagara ===
1946 Niagara Purple Eagles football
- Conference: Western New York Little Three Conference
- Record: 6–2 (0–2 Little Three)
- Head coach: James Moran Sr. (1st season)

The 1946 Niagara Purple Eagles football team represented Niagara University in Lewiston in Niagara County, New York. In their first year under head coach James Moran Sr., the Purple Eagles compiled a 6–2 record, finished in third place in the Little Three, and outscored opponents by a total of 151 to 55.

Date	Opponent	Site	Result	Attendance	Source
	Valparaiso		W 31–0		
	Ithaca		W 41–0		
October 13	St. Bonaventure	Buffalo, NY	L 7–29		
	Canisius		L 2–14		
	John Carroll*		W 14–6		
	Waynesburg		W 19–6		
	Hobart		W 25–0		
	Scranton		W 12–0		
*Non-conference game
