= William Brooks =

William or Will Brooks may refer to:

== Law and politics ==
- William Cunliffe Brooks (1819–1900), British lawyer and politician
- William Brooks (Australian politician) (1858–1937), New South Wales politician
- William Frederick Brooks (1863–1928), American businessman and politician

== Science and medicine ==
- William Edwin Brooks (1828–1899), Irish civil engineer and ornithologist
- William Robert Brooks (1844–1921), American astronomer
- William Keith Brooks (1848–1908), American zoologist
- William P. Brooks (1851–1938), American agricultural scientist
- William A. Brooks (1864–1921), American surgeon

== Sports ==
- William Brooks (footballer) (born 1873), English footballer
- Bud Brooks (William Brooks, 1930–2005), American football player
- Bucky Brooks (William Eldridge Brooks, Jr., born 1971), American football player and sportswriter
- Will Brooks (born 1986), American mixed martial artist
- Will Brooks (American football) (born 2001), American football safety
- Bill Brooks (coach, born 1922) (William Jasper Brooks, 1922–2010), American baseball and basketball coach
- Bill Brooks (American football coach) (William Townsend Brooks, 1945–2007), American football coach
- Billy Brooks (William McKinley Brooks III, born 1953), American football player
- Bill Brooks (wide receiver) (William T. Brooks Jr., born 1964), American football wide receiver
- Billy Brooks (footballer) (William Brooks, born 2004), Irish footballer

== Other people ==
- William Brooks of Blackburn (1762–1846), British businessman and cotton supplier
- William T. H. Brooks (1821–1870), Union Army general during the American Civil War
- William L. Brooks (1832–1874), American western outlaw
- William Brooks, 2nd Baron Crawshaw (1853–1929), English nobleman
- William Collin Brooks (1893–1959), British journalist, writer and broadcaster

== Other uses ==
- Smith Observatory and Dr. William R. Brooks House, historic home and observatory in Geneva, New York, U.S.
- Brooks Farm, also known as the William Brooks Farm, historic farmsite in Troy, Michigan, U.S.

== See also ==
- Bill Brooks (disambiguation)
- William Brookes (disambiguation)
- William Brooke (disambiguation)
