= C. F. Collins =

American football coach

Biographical details
- Born: September 13, 1885; Sizerville, Pennsylvania, U.S.
- Died: September 7, 1914 (aged 28); Norwich, Pennsylvania, U.S.

Coaching career (HC unless noted)
- 1907: St. Bonaventure

Charles Francis Collins (September 13, 1885 – September 7, 1914) was an American college football coach. He served as the head football coach at St. Bonaventure University in Allegany, New York.
