= 1951 St. Bonaventure Bonnies football team =

American college football season

1951 St. Bonaventure Bonnies football
- Conference: Independent
- Record: 5–4
- Head coach: Joe Bach (2nd season)
- Home stadium: Forness Stadium

The 1951 St. Bonaventure Brown Indians football team was an American football team that represented St. Bonaventure University during the 1951 college football season. In its second season under head coach Joe Bach, the team compiled a 5–4 record and outscored opponents by a total of 218 to 175. The team played its home games at Forness Stadium in Olean, New York.

Quarterback Ted Marchibroda led the team on offense. In nine games, Marchibroda completed 72 of 170 passes for 1,146 yards and 12 touchdowns. Halfback Jerry Hanifin led the team's rushing attack. Among its more notable contests was the October 27 game against the Louisville Cardinals, which marked the debut of Johnny Unitas.

In December 1951, one month after the season ended, coach Bach left the team to become head coach of the Pittsburgh Steelers.

In February 1952, St. Bonaventure announced that it was suspending competition in intercollegiate football, after the administration had said early in 1951 that it would "make every effort to carry on" despite financial problems and rival schools already dropping the sport. The school's president, Rev. Juvenal Lalor, stated that the decision was prompted by "ever increasing costs in every department and steadily declining income." The decision was part of a trend among Catholic universities in the post-war years to terminate their football programs. The trend included Portland (1949), Saint Louis (1949), Duquesne (1950), Georgetown (1950), (Note: Georgetown would resurrect its football program in 1964.) Saint Mary's (1950), (Note: Saint Mary's did make a comeback to football at "College Division" (ancestor of NCAA Division II and III) level between 1959 and 1992, and would play as an independent in NCAA division I-AA (ancestor of today's Football Championship Subdivision) between 1993 and 2003, before dropping football again after 2003.) Mount St. Mary's (1950), Niagara (1950), Loyola of Los Angeles (1951), San Francisco (1951), (Note: San Francisco did make a comeback to football at "College Division" level between 1959 and 1982, but has not fielded a varsity football team since 1983.) and Santa Clara (1952). (Note: Santa Clara did make a comeback to football at "College Division" level between 1959 and 1992, but has not fielded a varsity football team since 1993.)

== Schedule ==
Date	Opponent	Site	Result	Attendance	Source
September 16	Saint Francis (PA)	Forness Stadium; Olean, NY	W 65–6	4,000	
September 23	Xavier*	Forness Stadium; Olean, NY	L 6–40	9,500	
September 30	at Dayton*	Dayton, OH	L 14–35		
October 13	at John Carroll*	Cleveland, OH	W 20–13		
October 21	vs. Quantico Marines	Civic Stadium; Buffalo, NY	L 14–21	9,908	
October 27	Louisville	Forness Stadium; Olean, NY	W 22–21	6,500	
November 3	Youngstown	Forness Stadium; Olean, NY	W 39–6		
November 10	at Camp Lejeune	Jacksonville, NC	L 10–20	7,000	
November 18	Saint Vincent*	Bearcat Stadium; Latrobe, PA	W 28–13	1,500	
*Non-conference game
