= 1923 Niagara vs. Colgate football game =

Niagara vs. Colgate Players refuse to tackle
Niagara Purple Eagles	Colgate
(1–0)	(2–0)
0	55
Head coach: Pete Dwyer	Head coach: Dick Harlow
	1	2	3	4	Total
Niagara	0	0	0	0	0
Colgate	28	7	7	13	55
- Date: October 6, 1923
- Season: 1923
- Stadium: Whitnall Field
- Location: Hamilton, New York

The 1923 Niagara vs. Colgate football game was a college football game between the Niagara Purple Eagles and the Colgate Maroon played on October 6, 1923. The game was played at Whitnall Field in Hamilton Village, New York. The game is known for the Niagara team refusing to tackle their opponents during play and intentionally allowing them to score multiple times.

Coach Pete Dwyer of Niagara wanted to play four quarters of eight minutes in length rather than the standard 15-minute quarters, an agreement reached between the schools at an earlier date. Opposing coach Dick Harlow wanted nothing to do with the rule change and insisted on the standard 15 minutes. In protest, the players of Niagara refused to tackle their opponents. Dwyer told his team "I will dismiss from the squad any man who makes a tackle. I refuse to ruin you as a football team by playing 60 minutes against a team like that, even if they score 1,000 points." Colgate scored three touchdowns in the first two minutes before Harlow agreed to the 8 minute quarters and resumed the game.

Colgate's star halfback, Ed Tryon, scored a team record seven touchdowns in the game. His 42 total points also remain a Colgate record for a single game.
