= 1927 Canisius football team =

American college football season

1927 Canisius football

Little Three champion
- Conference: Western New York Little Three Conference
- Record: 7–1 (1–0 Little Three)
- Head coach: Luke Urban (7th season)

The 1927 Canisius football team was an American football team that represented Canisius College in the Western New York Little Three Conference (Little Three) during the 1927 college football season. Canisius compiled a 7–1 record, shut out five of eight opponents, won the Little Three championship, and outscored all opponents by a total of 173 to 42. Luke Urban was the head coach for the seventh year.

== Schedule ==
Date	Opponent	Site	Result	Attendance	Source
October 1	Waynesburg*	Buffalo, NY	W 7–6		
October 8	Washington College*	Buffalo, NY	W 49–0		
October 15	Coast Guard*		W 46–0		
October 22	Bethany (WV)*	Buffalo, NY	W 26–6		
October 29	Marshall*	Buffalo, NY	W 19–0		
November 11	at St. Thomas (PA)*	Catholic Club Field; Scranton, PA	W 12–0		
November 19	at Villanova*	Villanova Stadium; Villanova, PA	L 7–30	10,000	
November 26	St. Bonaventure	Buffalo, NY	W 7–0		
*Non-conference game
