= Worcester Oval =

American athletic grounds in Worcester, Massachusetts

- Interactive map of Worcester Oval
- Location: Anna Street and Coburn Avenue; Worcester, Massachusetts, U.S.
- Coordinates: 42°15′57″N 71°45′28″W
- Owner: Bigelow family (1891–1925); Roman Catholic Diocese of Springfield (1925–1950); Roman Catholic Diocese of Worcester (1950–1953); Xaverian Brothers (1953–1968)
- Capacity: 2,000

Construction
- Opened: 1891
- Renovated: 1925
- Closed: 1961
- Demolished: 1968
- Cost: $15,000

Tenants
- Holy Cross Crusaders (NCAA) 1892–1904; Worcester (New England League) 1894, 1898; Worcester Farmers/Quakers/Hustlers (Eastern League) 1899–1902; Worcester Reds (Connecticut League) 1904; Saint John's High School 1925–1961

The Worcester Oval was an American athletic grounds in Worcester, Massachusetts. Constructed for track and field, the venue hosted myriad other events, including college football and minor league baseball.

== History ==
=== Opening ===
On May 21, 1890, the Worcester Athletic Club was formed. The association consisted of about 250 members and elected Samuel Winslow as its first president. The Worcester Oval was constructed for the club at a cost of $15,000 (equivalent to $537,500 in 2025). It featured an oval cinder track that was a quarter-mile long and 15 feet wide with a 120-foot straightaway in front of the grandstand, as well as baseball diamonds and tennis courts. Its grandstand could hold 2,000 people and also housed the facility's locker rooms. The grounds opened on June 13, 1891, with 800 spectators attending the New England Association of the Amateur Athletic Union's first championship track and field meet.

=== Track and field ===
On October 10, 1891 the Worcester Athletic Club hosted a large open handicap meet that saw athletes from the Manhattan Athletic Club, Boston Athletic Association, and New York Athletic Club compete. On September 1, 1892, the Worcester Athletic Club hosted its largest event to date when roughly 1,500 spectators came out for the club's track meet. On July 4, 1895, 4,000 people turned out for the annual Worcester-Suffolk games, which was headlined by a two-mile match race between Thomas Conneff and George Orton that was won by Conneff, and a mile-long match race in which New England's outdoor champion Jimmy McLaughlin defeated the region's indoor champion Jerry Delaney.

In 1893, the New England Intercollegiate Athletic Association selected the Worcester Oval as the site for its annual meet. The meet, held on May 24, 1893, saw athletes from Dartmouth, Brown, Bowdoin, Amherst, Trinity, Worcester Polytechnic, Williams, Wesleyan, and Vermont compete in fifteen events. Dartmouth won five of the events, finished second in four, and third in two others to win the overall championship. The Massachusetts Institute of Technology won the 1894 meet in its first year of competition. At the 1898 meet, Jesse Lyman Hurlbut Jr. of Wesleyan broke the pole vaulting word's record by clearing 11 feet, 6.5 inches. In 1906, the meet was moved to Technology Field in Brookline, Massachusetts. It was held the Worcester Oval for a final time in 1907, but was returned to Technology Field in 1908. The NEIAA considered returning to the Worcester Oval in 1911 due to poor attendance and poor accessibility to street car lines at Technology Field, but the venue was not available. Pratt Field in Springfield, Massachusetts was instead chosen to host the meet.

On August 20, 1897, at the Memorial Hospital Athletic Games, Bernard Wefers broke the world record in the 110 metres hurdles. The following day, George B. Tincler broke an American record by completing a mile in 4:15:20 in a match race against Tommy Conneff. The record would stand until 1913, when it was broken by John Paul Jones. Tincler and Conneff faced off in a rematch the following month, which Tincler won despite giving Conneff a 25-yard head start.

In 1898, the New England Interscholastic Athletic Association moved its high school championship from Holmes Field in Cambridge, Massachusetts to the Worcester Oval. Worcester Academy won the first meet held at the oval, with Worcester High School finishing second. In 1900, the games were moved to Soldier's Field in Cambridge due to lack of participation from schools outside of Worcester.

On July 14, 1900, P. H. Fadgen defeated world record holder Piper Donovan in a 100-yard dash match race.

=== Holy Cross ===
In 1892, the Holy Cross Crusaders baseball team began playing at the Worcester Oval. The oval hosted the college's field day in 1896 and 1898. From 1897 to 1904, the Holy Cross Crusaders football team played many of its games at the Worcester Oval. In 1900, Holy Cross hosted its rival Boston College in an athletic meet at the Worcester Oval. It was the first meet of its kind between the schools in many years.

=== Baseball ===
In 1894, the Worcester club of the New England League played its games at the Worcester Oval. On October 7, 1897, the Boston Beaneaters and Baltimore Orioles played an exhibition game as part of a two-day barnstorming trip. In 1898, Charles F. Rice moved the New Bedford Whalers of the New England League to the Worcester Oval. From 1899 to 1902, the oval was the home field of the Worcester club of the Eastern League. On August 2, 1900, the Worcester and Hartford police departments played a baseball game at the Worcester Oval. In 1904, the Norwich club of the Connecticut League was purchased by Malachi Kittridge and relocated to Worcester Oval. The team played 20 games at the Worcester Oval before moving back to Norwich. Minor league baseball ceased at the Worcester Oval following the construction of Boulevard Park in Worcester in 1906.

=== Worcester Polytechnic Institute ===
In 1893, Worcester Polytechnic Institute's football team (WPI) played Trinity to a 16–16 tie in a game at the Worcester Oval. On October 22, 1910, WPI defeated Rensselaer Polytechnic Institute (RPI) 8–0 at the oval.

On May 14, 1910, WPI defeated Holy Cross and RPI in a three-team meet. WPI hosted another triangular meet the following year, this time between WPI, Brown, and Trinity that was won by Brown.

=== Other events ===
The Worcester Athletic Club joined the National Lawn Tennis Association in 1892 and hosted its first tennis tournament at the Oval that June. Tracey Hoppin of Harvard defeated H. G. Bixby of Nashua, New Hampshire to win the tournament.

On September 8, 1899, cyclist Major Taylor won a half-mile open race with Nat Butler coming in a close second. He also defeated James J. Casey in a five-mile pursuit race.

In 1906, the Worcester Automobile Club hosted its Gymkhana event at the Worcester Oval.

In 1909, the Worcester Academy, coached by Frank Cavanaugh, defeated Williston Academy at the Worcester Oval to claim the prep school football championship.

== Saint John's High School and closure ==
The Worcester Oval closed in 1915 and remained dormant until 1925, when it was purchased by Bishop Thomas Michael O'Leary for use as an athletic field for Saint John's High School. In 1962, Saint John's moved from Worcester to Shrewsbury, Massachusetts. The St. George Orthodox Cathedral was built on the site in 1971.
