= Bill Brooks =

Bill or Billy Brooks may refer to:

- Bill Brooks (coach, born 1922) (1922–2010), American baseball and basketball coach
- Bill Brooks (American football coach) (1945–2007), American football coach
- Billy Brooks (born 1953), American football player
- Bill Brooks (wide receiver) (born 1964), American football wide receiver
- Billy Brooks (footballer) (born 2004), Irish footballer
- Billy Lewis Brooks (1943–2023), American jazz percussionist and flautist

== See also ==
- William Brooks (disambiguation)
- Bill Brookes, rugby league footballer of the 1900s
- Brooks Field (Wilmington), UNC Wilmington baseball stadium, officially the Bill Brooks Field
