= William Brooke =

William Brooke may refer to:

- William Brooke, 10th Baron Cobham (1527–1597), English peer and MP for Hythe and Rochester
- William Brooke (1565–1597), English MP for Rochester and Kent. Son of above. Killed in duel.
- William Brooke (MP, died 1643) (1598–1643), English soldier and politician
- William Henry Brooke (1772–1860), English artist
- Willie Brooke (1895–1939), trade union administrator and politician
- Will Brooke, Chief of Staff to Senator Burns
- Will Brooke (businessman) (born 1957), Alabama businessman and political candidate

== See also ==
- William Brooks (disambiguation)
- William Brooke O'Shaughnessy (1808–1889), Irish physician
- William Broke, English academic administrator
