= William Joy (American football) =

American football player and coach (1888–1969)

Biographical details
- Born: c. 1888; Boston, Massachusetts, U.S.
- Died: September 13, 1969 (aged 81); Milton, Massachusetts, U.S.

Playing career
- 1909–1911: Holy Cross
- Position: End

Coaching career (HC unless noted)
- 1912–1913: Boston College
- 1914–1917: Hyde Park HS (MA)
- 1921–1926: Boston College (assistant)
- 1927–1932: Fordham (assistant)
- 1933–1938: Canisius

Head coaching record
- Overall: 32–24–5 (college)

Accomplishments and honors

Championships
- 2 Western New York Little Three Conference (1934, 1936)

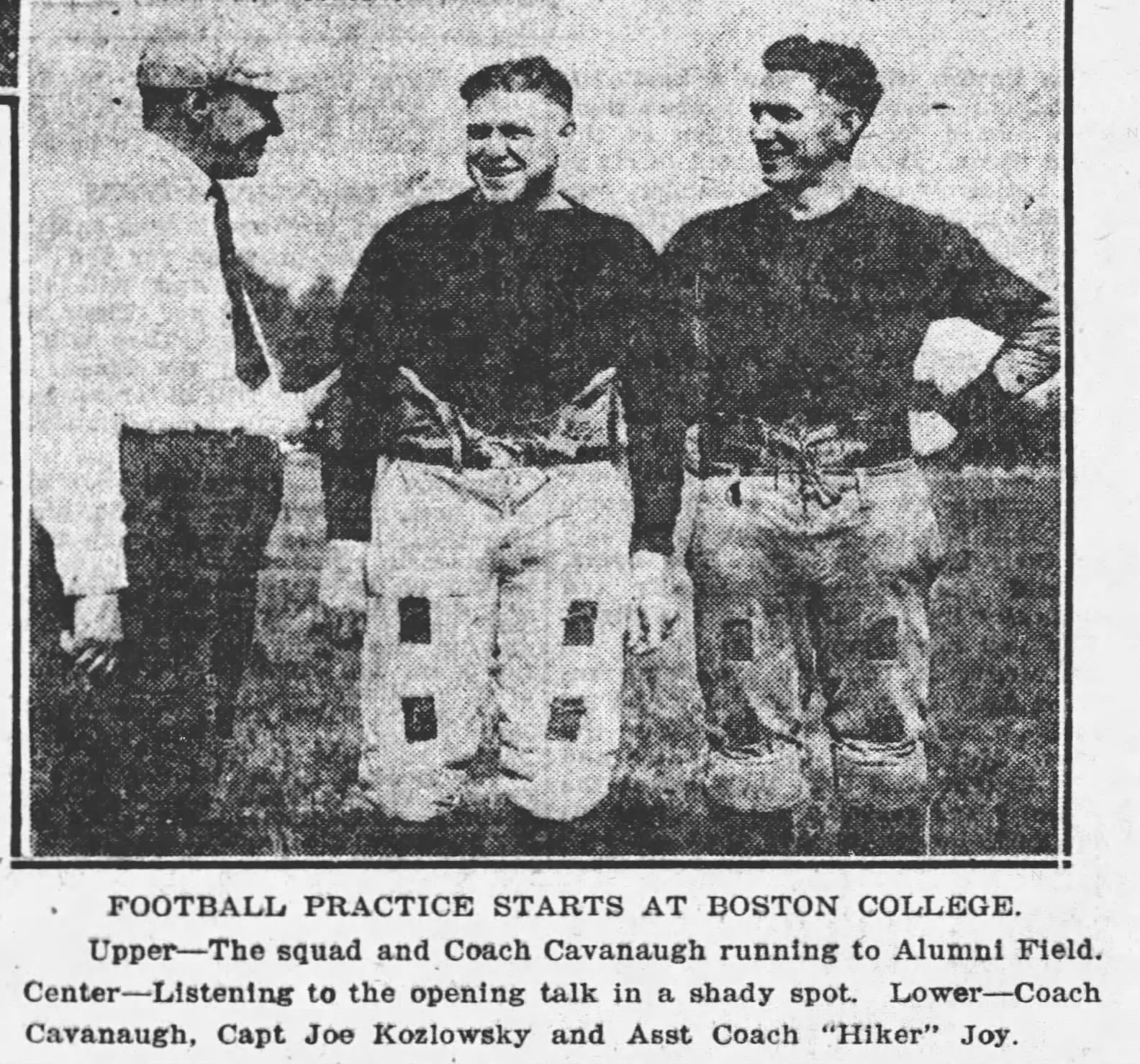

William Patrick "Hiker" Joy (c. 1888 – September 13, 1969) was an American football player and coach. He served as the head football coach at Boston College from 1912 to 1913 and at Canisius College from 1933 to 1938, compiling a career college football head coaching record of 32–24–5.

== Early life ==
Joy was born in Boston and attended South Boston High School. He was a member of the school's football, track, and basketball teams. He went on to attend the College of the Holy Cross, where he was a member of the member of the varsity relay team for four years and was captain of the Holy Cross Crusaders football and basketball teams during his senior year.

== Coaching career ==
Joy was hired as Boston College's head coach months after graduating college. In his second season as head coach, he led BC to their first winning season of the 20th century. On December 14, 1914, Joy was named faculty coach at Hyde Park High School in Hyde Park, Massachusetts. He left Hyde Park following the outbreak of World War I to join the United States Army Air Service. After the war, Joy scouted for the Princeton Tigers football team. He returned to Boston College in 1921 as an assistant to Frank Cavanaugh. When Cavanaugh left BC in 1927, Joy followed him to Fordham where he remained as an assistant until 1932. From 1933 to 1938, Joy was the head coach at Canisius College.

== Later life ==
In 1939, Joy retired from sports and returned to Massachusetts, where he worked as an insurance broker and was a trustee of the Boston Elevated Railway. Joy was appointed to the Boston Elevated Railway trusteeship by Governor Charles F. Hurley, who had played football at Boston College while Joy was an assistant coach there. In 1943, RKO Radio Pictures hired Joy as a technical advisor for football sequences in The Iron Major, a biographical film about Frank Cavanaugh. Joy died on September 13, 1969, at his home in Milton, Massachusetts. He was 81 years old.

== Head coaching record ==
=== College ===
Year	Team	Overall	Conference	Standing	Bowl/playoffs
Boston College (Independent) (1912–1913)
1912	Boston College	2–4–1			
1913	Boston College	4–3–1			
Boston College:		6–7–2			
Canisius Griffins / Golden Griffins (Western New York Little Three Conference) (1933–1938)
1933	Canisius	6–1–1	0–1–1	3rd	
1934	Canisius	4–2	2–0	1st	
1935	Canisius	3–3–1	1–1	2nd	
1936	Canisius	7–1	2–0	1st	
1937	Canisius	4–4–1	1–1		
1938	Canisius	2–6	1–1		
Canisius:		26–17–3	7–4–1		
Total:		32–24–5			
National championship Conference title Conference division title or championship game berth
