= 1946 Western Ontario Mustangs football team =

College football season

1946 Western Ontario Mustangs football
- Conference: Intercollegiate Union
- Record: 7–1 (6–0 Intercollegiate Union)
- Head coach: John P. Metras

The 1946 Western Ontario Mustangs football team represented the University of Western Ontario in the Intercollegiate Union during the 1946 season. Led by head coach John P. Metras, the Mustangs compiled a 7–1 record and outscored opponent by a total of 214 to 64.

Prior to the season, the Mustangs had been undefeated in university football since 1938. The undefeated streak ended with the opening game against Canisius.

== Schedule ==
Date	Opponent	Site	Result	Attendance	Source
September 20	at Canisius*	Buffalo, NY	L 3–34		
September 28	Oshawa*	Little Memorial Stadium; London, Ontario	W 91–0		
October 5	Toronto	Little Memorial Stadium; London, Ontario	W 20–7	10,000	
October 12	at Queen's	Kingston, Ontario	W 8–0		
October 19	McGill	Little Memorial Stadium; London, Ontario	W 18–2		
October 26	at McGill	Molson Stadium; Montreal	W 12–7	14,500	
November 2	at Toronto	Toronto	W 15–6		
November 9	Queen's	Little Memorial Stadium; London, Ontario	W 47–8		
*Non-conference game
