= Joe Bach =

American football player and coach (1901–1966)

- Bach in 1934

Biographical details
- Born: January 17, 1901; Tower, Minnesota, U.S.
- Died: October 24, 1966 (aged 65); Pittsburgh, Pennsylvania, U.S.

Playing career
- 1921: Carleton
- 1923–1924: Notre Dame
- Position: Tackle

Coaching career (HC unless noted)
- 1925–1928: Syracuse (assistant)
- 1929–1933: Duquesne (assistant)
- 1934: Duquesne
- 1935–1936: Pittsburgh Pirates
- 1937–1941: Niagara
- 1942: Fort Knox
- 1943–1947: Detroit Lions (assistant)
- 1948: Boston Yanks (assistant)
- 1949: New York Bulldogs (line)
- 1950–1951: St. Bonaventure
- 1952–1953: Pittsburgh Steelers

Head coaching record
- Overall: 45–28–4 (college); 21–27 (NFL)

Accomplishments and honors

Championships
- 4 Western New York Little Three (1937–1938, 1940–1941)

Joseph Anthony Bach (January 17, 1901 – October 24, 1966) was one of Notre Dame's famed "Seven Mules" and later the head coach for the NFL's Pittsburgh Pirates (1935–36) and later the renamed Pittsburgh Steelers (1952–53).

== Early life ==
Bach was born in Tower, Minnesota on January 17, 1901. His father was an originally from Styria, Slovenia before migrating to the United States in 1900 with his wife, Marie Novak.

As a young man, Bach grew up at 327 Elm Street in Tower. Bach engaged in various athletic activities during his youth. After the death of his father when he was six years old, he experienced disciplinary issues that led to a brief stay at the Minnesota Training School in Red Wing. He later redirected his focus toward athletics. At Chisholm High School, he declared himself captain of the newly formed swimming team, played as a running back on the football team. He was also a standout basketball player, during the 1918–1919 season, he scored 15 field goals in a 60–5 victory over Biwabik, contributing to the team's District title win.

== College career ==
After his graduation in 1919, Bach enrolled at the University of Notre Dame. While there, he continue to pursue athletics. As a senior, he was a lineman on the 1924 national title team — the first Irish team to win a championship, and had a pivotal role in Notre Dame's first Rose Bowl trip in January 1925. Famous for the Four Horsemen backfield, the line that blocked for them was known as "The Seven Mules."

== Coaching career ==
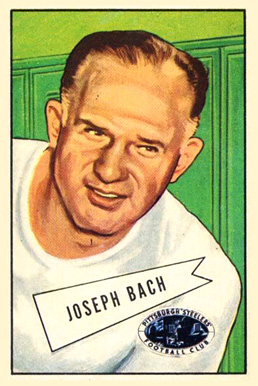
Bach on a 1952 Bowman football card.

Bach became the Pirates coach in 1935 directing the young franchise to their best record yet at 4 wins and 8 losses followed by the 1936 campaign in which he coached the Pirates to their first ever non-losing season at 6 wins and 6 losses. He left the team following 1936 to go back into college football.

Bach spent the 1950 and 1951 seasons as head coach of the St. Bonaventure Brown Indians football team, where Silas Rooney, Steelers owner Art Rooney's brother, was serving as athletic director; St. Bonaventure University ceased sponsoring football after the 1951 season.

In 1953, Bach returned as the head coach for the Steelers and installed the T-formation. Pittsburgh had been the last franchise to operate the single wing. The Steelers finished with 5 wins and 7 losses in 1952, and with 6 wins and 6 losses in 1953. Following three home defeats to begin the pre-season in 1954,

Bach resigned during training camp in late August. He was succeeded by line coach Walt Kiesling, a previous head coach with the team.

== Later life ==
Bach later worked as a state labor mediator and continued as a scout for the Steelers and was an active member of its alumni association.

Minutes after the conclusion of a banquet luncheon in his honor on October 24, 1966, Bach collapsed and died from a sudden heart attack.

== Head coaching record ==
=== College ===
| Year | Team | Overall | Conference | Standing | Bowl/playoffs |
|---|---|---|---|---|---|
Duquesne Dukes (Independent) (1934)
| 1934 | Duquesne | 8–2 | | | |
| Duquesne: | | 8–2 | | | |
Niagara Purple Eagles (Western New York Little Three Conference) (1937–1941)
| 1937 | Niagara | 6–2 | 1–1 | T–1st | |
| 1938 | Niagara | 7–2 | 2–0 | 1st | |
| 1939 | Niagara | 2–4–2 | 0–1–1 | T–2nd | |
| 1940 | Niagara | 6–1–1 | 2–0 | 1st | |
| 1941 | Niagara | 2–5–1 | 1–1 | T–1st | |
| Niagara: | | 23–14–4 | 6–3–1 | | |
Fort Knox Armoraiders (Independent) (1942)
| 1942 | Fort Knox | 2–6 | | | |
| Fort Knox: | | 2–6 | | | |
St. Bonaventure Bonnies (Independent) (1950–1951)
| 1950 | St. Bonaventure | 7–2 | | | |
| 1951 | St. Bonaventure | 5–4 | | | |
| St. Bonaventure: | | 12–6 | | | |
| Total: | | 45–28–4 | | | |
National championship Conference title Conference division title or championship game berth
