= William Brookes =

William Brookes may refer to:

- William Penny Brookes (1809–1895), English surgeon
- William Brookes (New South Wales politician), member of the New South Wales Legislative Assembly
- William Brookes (Queensland politician) (1825–1898), member of the Queensland Legislative Assembly
- William Brookes (miner) (1834–1910), Australian gold miner, pastoralist and paper manufacturer
- Bill Brookes (c. 1882–1947), English rugby league player

== See also ==
- William Brookes School, Much Wenlock, Shropshire, England
- William Brooks (disambiguation)
