= Matt Conte =

American football player and coach (1926–2012)

Biographical details
- Born: October 5, 1926; Scranton, Pennsylvania, U.S.
- Died: March 17, 2012 (aged 85); Glendale, Arizona, U.S.

Playing career
- 1947–1950: St. Bonaventure

Coaching career (HC unless noted)
- 1968–1970: St. Bonaventure
- 1981: Gerard Catholic HS (AZ)

Matt Armondo Conte (October 5, 1926 – March 17, 2012) was an American football player and coach. He served as the head football coach at St. Bonaventure University in Allegany, New York from 1968 to 1970.
