= Eddie Tryon =

American football player (1900–1982)

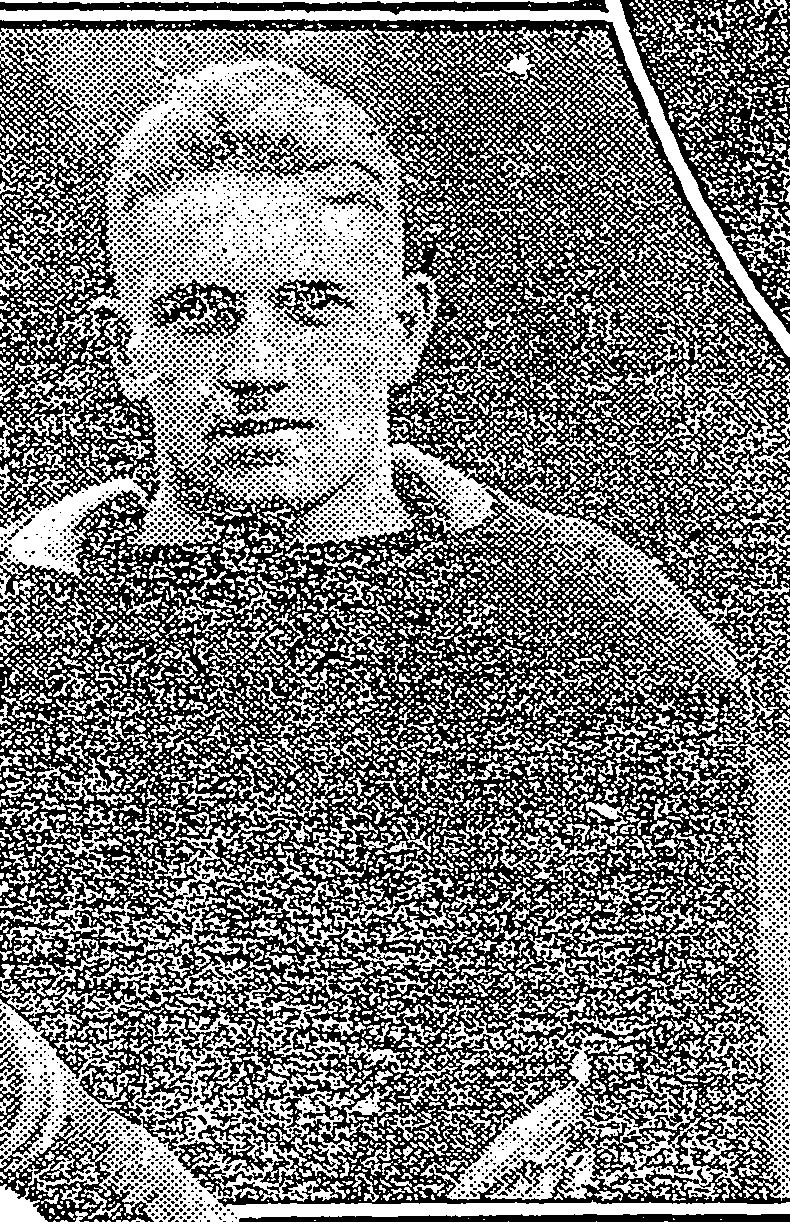

No. 19
- Position: Halfback

Personal information
- Born: July 25, 1900; Medford, Massachusetts, U.S.
- Died: May 1, 1982 (aged 81); St. Petersburg, Florida, U.S.
- Listed height: 5 ft 8 in (1.73 m)
- Listed weight: 180 lb (82 kg)

Career information
- High school: Medford
- College: Colgate

Career history
- New York Yankees (AFL I/NFL) (1926-1927)

Awards and highlights
- First-team All-American (1925); Second-team All-American (1923); First-team All-Eastern (1925)

Career statistics
- Games played: 14
- Stats at Pro Football Reference
- College Football Hall of Fame

Joseph Edward Tryon (July 25, 1900 – May 1, 1982) was an American football player and coach. He was elected to the College Football Hall of Fame in 1963.

== Biography ==
Tryon played the halfback position at Colgate University from 1922 to 1925. As a senior in 1925, Tryon led Colgate to an undefeated 7-0-2 record and scored 111 points (15 touchdowns and 21 extra points). Tryon still holds the Colgate record for most touchdowns (7) and most points scored in a game (42); a feat he accomplished in a 1923 game against Niagara. He was selected by Athlete and Sportsman magazine and the New York Sun as a first-team player on their 1925 College Football All-America Teams. In the following two years, he played in the AFL I then the National Football League for the New York Yankees at the tailback position. In the AFL's only season, Eddie Tryon led the league in points with 72. In his only NFL season, Tryon scored 44 points and was selected as a second-team All-NFL player by the Green Bay Press-Gazette.

== Hobart ==
Tryon was the head football coach at Hobart and William Smith Colleges from 1946 to 1962, compiling a record of 65–52–7.
