= Dan DeSantis =

American football player (1918–2004)

Profile
- Position: Halfback

Personal information
- Born: September 21, 1918; Niagara Falls, New York, U.S.
- Died: December 28, 2004 (aged 86); Lockport, New York, U.S.
- Listed height: 6 ft 0 in (1.83 m)
- Listed weight: 180 lb (82 kg)

Career information
- College: Niagara

Career history
- Philadelphia Eagles (1941)

Career statistics
- Games: 11
- Rushing attempts: 45
- Rushing yards: 125
- Stats at Pro Football Reference

Daniel J. DeSantis (September 21, 1918 – December 28, 2004) was an American football running back in the National Football League for the Philadelphia Eagles and in the Canadian Football League for the Hamilton Tiger-Cats. He was also a lieutenant colonel in the United States Air Force.

== Career ==
DeSantis was a prominent athlete known both locally and nationally. While in high school, he earned all city honors in both football and basketball at the former Trott Vocational High School. At Niagara University, he played football as a halfback and was named to the all-star team of the Little Three Conference, the All East Squad and also earned All American honorable mention in 1940. He also played American Legion, Muny League, and Industrial League baseball as well. DeSantis went on to play professional football with the Philadelphia Eagles from 1941 until 1946 and would later become the first NFL player to play in the Canadian Football League when he joined the Hamilton Tiger-Cats in 1947.

== Personal life ==
DeSantis was born in Niagara Falls, New York. He graduated from Niagara Falls High School in 1937. He graduated from Niagara University with a bachelor's degree in accounting in 1941. He served in the United States Army during the second World War as a captain with the 4032nd Army Air Force Base Unit, from March 16, 1942 until his honorable discharge on April 1, 1946. He later actively served as major with the U.S. Air Force during the Korean War, from April 16, 1951 until his honorable discharge on September 15, 1952. After that, he continued serving in the U.S. Air Force Reserves until his honorable discharge as a lieutenant colonel on July 7, 1969. For twenty-five years, he was employed as a traffic coordinator at Kimberly Clark in Niagara Falls, New York.
