= Luke Urban =

American athlete and coach (1898–1980)

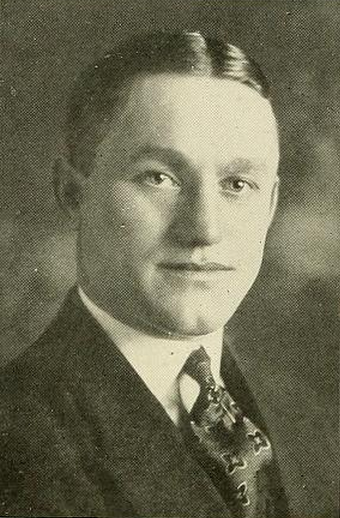
- Urban pictured in Sub Turri 1921, Boston College yearbook

Biographical details
- Born: March 22, 1898; Fall River, Massachusetts, U.S.
- Died: December 7, 1980 (aged 82); Somerset, Massachusetts, U.S.

Playing career

Football
- 1916–1917: Boston College
- 1919–1920: Boston College
- 1921–1923: Buffalo All-Americans/Bisons

Basketball
- c. 1920: Boston College

Baseball
- c. 1920: Boston College
- 1922–1923: Buffalo Bisons
- 1924–1925: Columbus Senators
- 1926–1927: Toledo Mud Hens
- 1927–1928: Boston Braves
- 1928–1929: Buffalo Bisons
- 1931: Springfield Ponies

Ice hockey
- c. 1920: Boston College
- Positions: End (football); Catcher (baseball)

Coaching career (HC unless noted)

Football
- 1921–1930: Canisius

Basketball
- 1918–1921: Boston College
- 1921–1924: Canisius
- 1925–1931: Canisius
- 1940–1960: Durfee HS (MA)

Baseball
- 1948–1950: Fall River Indians

Head coaching record
- Overall: 46–27–7 (college football); 84–57 (college basketball); 247–91 (high school basketball)

Accomplishments and honors

Championships
- Basketball; 4 Eastern Massachusetts Basketball (1947, 1948, 1952, 1956); 2 New England Basketball (1948, 1956)

Awards
- Football; Consensus All-American (1920); All-APFA (1920); 2× All-NFL (1922–1923); Boston College Eagles Jersey retired

Luke Urban
- Catcher
- Born: March 22, 1898; Fall River, Massachusetts
- Died: December 7, 1980 (aged 82); Somerset, Massachusetts
- Batted: Right Threw: Right

MLB debut
- July 19, 1927, for the Boston Braves

Last MLB appearance
- June 21, 1928, for the Boston Braves

MLB statistics
- Batting average: .273
- Hits: 35
- RBIs: 12
- Stats at Baseball Reference

Teams
- Boston Braves (1927–1928)

Louis John "Luke" Urban (March 22, 1898 – December 7, 1980) was an American multi-sport athlete and coach. He played four seasons of professional football in the National Football League and two years of Major League Baseball with the Boston Braves. Urban was also a college football coach, a college and high school basketball coach, and a minor league baseball manager.

== Playing career ==
=== College ===
Urban played football, basketball, baseball and ice hockey for the Boston College Eagles. He was a captain for the football, basketball and baseball teams. He was a member of the 1920 College Football All-America Team.

=== Football ===
Urban played end for the Buffalo All-Americans from 1921 to 1924. He was named to the Buffalo Evening News All-APFA Team in 1921, George Halas' All-NFL Team in 1922, and the Collyers Eye Magazine and Canton Daily News All-NFL Team in 1923.

=== Baseball ===
Urban signed with the New York Yankees and played for their minor league teams in Buffalo and Columbus. He made the Major Leagues in 1927 with the Boston Braves. He appeared in 35 games for the Braves that season. Urban refused to report to spring training in 1928 as part of a contract holdout. He eventually reported to camp late. On June 22, 1928, he was traded with Jimmy Cooney and Johnny Werts for Bonnie Hollingsworth. He played for Buffalo from 1928 to 1930 and the Springfield Ponies in 1931, and the Hartford Senators from 1931 to 1932.

=== Basketball ===
Urban played basketball for Worcester Five of the Inter-State Basketball League in 1921.

== Coaching career ==
Urban served as Boston College's head basketball coach during his sophomore, junior and senior seasons.

Following his graduation, Urban was offered the position of head football coach at Creighton University, but turned down the offer in order to play professional football. From 1921 to 1930, he was the head basketball and football coach at Canisius College. His football teams had a record of 46–27–7 record, with of his eight clubs having a record of .500 or better. He was the school's winningest football coach until he was passed by Tom Hersey in 1990.

Urban was the head basketball coach at Durfee High School in Fall River, Massachusetts from 1940 to 1960. He had a 247–91 record with the Hilltoppers and won two New England championships.

Urban was the manager of the Fall River Indians of the New England League from 1948 to 1950.

== Honors ==
Urban was inducted into the MBCA Hall of Fame in 1965, the Boston College Varsity Club Athletic Hall of Fame in 1970 and the Canisius College Athletics Hall of Fame in 1976. Durfee High's gymnasium was named the Luke Urban Field House in honor of Urban.

== Head coaching record ==
=== College football ===
Year	Team	Overall	Conference	Standing	Bowl/playoffs
Canisius Golden Griffins (Independent) (1921–1925)
1921	Canisius	4–3–2			
1922	Canisius	5–2–1			
1923	Canisius	8–1			
1924	Canisius	4–3			
1925	Canisius	4–4			
Canisius Golden Griffins (Western New York Little Three Conference) (1926–1930)
1926	Canisius	2–5–1			
1927	Canisius	7–1			
1928	Canisius	5–1–1			
1929	Canisius	3–4–1			
1930	Canisius	4–3–1			
Canisius:		46–27–7			
Total:		46–27–7			

=== College basketball ===
Record table
Season	Team	Overall	Conference	Standing	Postseason
Boston College Eagles () (1918–1921)
1918–19	Boston College	4–1			
1919–20	Boston College	5–3			
1920–21	Boston College	7–6			
Boston College:		16–10			
Canisius Golden Griffins () (1921–1924)
1921–22	Canisius	6–4			
1922–23	Canisius	10–4			
1923–24	Canisius	8–1			
Canisius Golden Griffins () (1925–1931)
1925–26	Canisius	5–8			
1926–27	Canisius	9–5			
1927–28	Canisius	8–5			
1928–29	Canisius	7–5			
1929–30	Canisius	5–12			
1930–31	Canisius	10–5			
Canisius:		68–47			
Total:		84–57			
