= Tom Hersey =

American football coach

Playing career
- 1959: Cornell
- 1960–1962: Buffalo

Coaching career (HC unless noted)
- 1977–1981: Canisius (assistant)
- 1982–1991: Canisius

Head coaching record
- Overall: 69–22–2

Accomplishments and honors

Awards
- Canisius College Athletics Hall of Fame inductee (2004)

Tom Hersey is an American football coach who served as head football coach at Canisius College.

Hersey played freshman football at Cornell University, before transferring to the University at Buffalo and playing for the Buffalo Bulls football team. Hersey served as the head football coach at Canisius College from 1982 to 1991. He is Canisius football's all-time winningest coach, passing Luke Urban with a record of 69–22–2.

== Head coaching record ==
Year	Team	Overall	Conference	Standing	Bowl/playoffs
Canisius Golden Griffins (NCAA Division III Independent) (1982–1991)
1982	Canisius	6–3			
1983	Canisius	9-1			
1984	Canisius	8-2			
1985	Canisius	7–2			
1986	Canisius	7-3			
1987	Canisius	6–3–1			
1988	Canisius	6–3			
1989	Canisius	5–4			
1990	Canisius	8-2			
1991	Canisius	5-4			
Canisius:		69–22–2			
Total:		69–22–2			
