= Kid McLaughlin =

American baseball player (1888–1934)

- Center fielder
- Born: April 12, 1888; Randolph, New York, U.S.
- Died: November 17, 1934 (aged 46); Allegany, New York, U.S.
- Batted: Left Threw: Right

MLB debut
- June 30, 1914, for the Cincinnati Reds

Last MLB appearance
- July 12, 1914, for the Cincinnati Reds

MLB statistics
- Games played: 3
- At-bats: 2
- Runs scored: 1
- Stats at Baseball Reference

Teams
- Cincinnati Reds (1914)

James Anson "Kid" McLaughlin (April 12, 1888 – July 12, 1934) was a center fielder in Major League Baseball. Nicknamed "Sunshine", he played for the Cincinnati Reds in 1914.

He was also the head football and baseball coach for St. Bonaventure University.
