= Hugh Devore =

American football player and coach (1910–1992)

Biographical details
- Born: November 25, 1910; Newark, New Jersey, U.S.
- Died: December 8, 1992 (aged 82); Edmond, Oklahoma, U.S.

Playing career
- 1931–1933: Notre Dame
- Position: End

Coaching career (HC unless noted)
- 1934: Notre Dame (freshmen)
- 1935–1938: Fordham (line)
- 1938–1941: Providence
- 1942: Holy Cross (assistant)
- 1943–1944: Notre Dame (line)
- 1945: Notre Dame
- 1946–1949: St. Bonaventure
- 1950–1952: NYU
- 1953: Green Bay Packers (assistant)
- 1954–1955: Dayton
- 1956–1957: Philadelphia Eagles
- 1958–1962: Notre Dame (freshmen)
- 1963: Notre Dame
- 1966–1970: Houston Oilers (assistant)

Administrative career (AD unless noted)
- 1945: Notre Dame
- 1964–1966: Notre Dame (assistant AD)

Head coaching record
- Overall: 58–65–8 (college); 7–18–1 (NFL)

Accomplishments and honors

Championships
- 2 Western New York Little Three (1946, 1949)

Awards
- Third-team All-American (1933)

Hugh John Devore (November 25, 1910 – December 8, 1992) was an American football player and coach. He served as the head football coach at Providence College (1938–1941), the University of Notre Dame (1945 and 1963), St. Bonaventure University (1946–1949), New York University,(1950–1952), and the University of Dayton (1954–1955), compiling a career college football coaching record of 58–65–8. Devore was also the head coach for Philadelphia Eagles of the National Football League (NFL), tallying a mark of 7–18–1. He played college football at Notre Dame as an end from 1931 to 1933.

== Early life and playing career ==
Devore was born and raised in Newark, New Jersey, and was a three-sport star at the city's St. Benedict's Prep. He was then recruited by the legendary Knute Rockne to play at Notre Dame. While playing on the freshman squad in 1930, Devore caught Rockne's eye during an intrasquad scrimmage when he stopped All-America quarterback Frank Carideo with a crushing tackle. Unfortunately, Devore never had the opportunity to play for Rockne in an official game after the coach was killed in a plane crash on March 31, 1931.

During his three years as a member of the Fighting Irish varsity, Devore played at end under Hunk Anderson, serving as co-captain during his senior year in 1933.

== Coaching career ==
Upon graduating from Notre Dame, Devore stayed at his alma mater the following year as freshman football coach, then followed fellow Irish alum Jim Crowley as line coach at Fordham University in 1935.

=== Providence, Holy Cross ===
Following three seasons in that role, made famous by his coaching Fordham's iconic "Seven Blocks of Granite", a unit that included future Pro Football Hall of Fame coach Vince Lombardi he accepted his first head coaching position when he was hired at Providence College on January 20, 1938, and served as head coach of the Friars through the 1941 season and compiled a record of 12–19–2. After finishing his fourth season with the Friars, Devore then took an assistant coaching position with the College of the Holy Cross on January 11, 1942. His one year at the school was marked by his outstanding scouting report of rival Boston College, leading to a stunning 55–12 upset of the Eagles in the season finale. In a strange twist of fate, Devore probably saved the lives of most or all of the BC players. The overconfident BC team had made reservations at Boston's Cocoanut Grove nightclub to celebrate their victory but cancelled. That night Cocoanut Grove burned down with the loss of 492 lives.

=== Return to Notre Dame ===
Devore then returned to his alma mater as ends coach the following year. When Irish head coach Frank Leahy entered the U.S. Navy in early 1944, Edward McKeever was named interim head coach and guided the Irish to an 8–2 record. However, when McKeever accepted the head coaching slot at Cornell University, Devore took his place on March 6, 1945. Notre Dame started that season in strong fashion with five straight wins and was ranked second in the nation, but a 48–0 thrashing by a potent Army squad ended hopes of a national title, with the Irish closing out the year with a 7–2–1 mark.

=== St. Bonaventure ===
Upon Leahy's return, Devore was under consideration for the head coaching position at the University of Arkansas, but instead signed to lead St. Bonaventure College on February 13, 1946. In his first three years, Devore led his teams to a 19–5–1 record, including a 7–1–1 mark in 1948, an effort that earned him a new three-year contract. Yet after one 6–4 season, Devore announced his resignation on February 2, 1950, to accept the head coaching position at New York University, citing the proximity to his New Jersey roots.

=== NYU ===
Devore was the 24th and last head football coach at the New York University (NYU). His coaching record at NYU was 4–17–2.

Devore had entered the job in hopes of improving the fortunes of the once-powerful program which had struggled after years of neglect and strict academic standards that had led to a severe downturn. The effort went for naught when after three years of trying, the school announced on March 10, 1953, that it was dropping its football program after 80 seasons, leaving Devore and his staff looking for work.

=== Green Bay Packers, Dayton ===
Less than a month later, Devore found employment at the professional level for the first time as an assistant with the NFL's Green Bay Packers. That role lasted only one season, with Devore and Ray McLean serving as co-coaches for the team's final two games. Devore then returned to the colleges as head coach at the University of Dayton on January 6, 1954. After two seasons with the Flyers in which he compiled an 8–11–1 record (one of his players was future Notre Dame head coach Gerry Faust), homesickness pangs once again led him to accept the position of head coach of the NFL Eagles on January 9, 1956. The move, prompted by the strong urgings of league commissioner Bert Bell, engendered some controversy after Devore had first turned the position down because of his new four-year contract with Dayton.

=== Philadelphia Eagles ===
Despite adding assistants such as former New York Giants head coach Steve Owen, Devore struggled during his two seasons in the City of Brotherly Love, compiling a mark of 7–16–1. The poor record led to Devore's firing on January 11, 1958, but the mentor quickly found work again at Notre Dame as freshman coach and assistant athletic director.

=== Second return to Notre Dame ===
The following year, after having recommended his former Fordham player Vince Lombardi for the Packers' head coaching position, Devore was retained as freshman coach by new head coach Joe Kuharich after Terry Brennan was dismissed along with his entire staff. Then when Kuharich resigned during spring practice in March 1963, Devore was once again named interim head coach at the school. In a complete reversal of his earlier stint, Devore's one season at the helm saw Notre Dame hit rock bottom with a 2–7 record (the scheduled game at Iowa was canceled due to the assassination of John F. Kennedy). One of the few bright spots was a midseason 17–14 upset of the University of Southern California, while the season finale against Syracuse University saw Devore adorn his team in bright green jerseys, a sharp contrast to the school's traditional blue and gold. The green jerseys did not return until Dan Devine broke them out for the 1977 matchup with USC.

Despite the 2–7 docket in 1963, the beloved, personable Devore, affectionately known as "Hughie", boosted the morale of the squad that had been left devoid of emotion under Kuharich. He knew all along that he was merely a stopgap measure while the search for a permanent replacement was being conducted and maintained, "I'll do whatever Notre Dame feels is best for me." The following year, he was presented with a game ball after Notre Dame's victory over Stanford, and new coach Ara Parseghian praised Devore for making his job that much easier.

The arrival of Ara Parseghian brought an exciting new era to the Golden Dome, including a near-national championship during his first season in 1964. Devore served as assistant athletic director during each of Parseghian's first two years, but on February 9, 1966, he was hired as an assistant coach for the American Football League's Houston Oilers under Wally Lemm.

== Later life and family ==
After five years in that capacity, Devore then went to work as promotions director for the Houston Sports Association, dealing primarily with bringing in events for the city's Astrodome. He continued working until retiring at the age of 75 in 1986.

Health issues led Devore to move in with his daughter, Noreen, in August 1992, and four months later, he died, nearly two weeks after his 82nd birthday. His death was overshadowed in the Notre Dame community by the passing of former Irish athletic director Moose Krause, who died in his sleep three days later.

Devore was married to the former Madeline Foster on January 15, 1938, who preceded him in death. They had seven children. Devore's grandsons, Charlie and Russ Haas, were professional wrestlers who worked for WWE.

== Head coaching record ==
=== College ===
Year	Team	Overall	Conference	Standing	Bowl/playoffs	AP^{#}
Providence Friars (Independent) (1938–1941)
1938	Providence	3–5				
1939	Providence	3–5				
1940	Providence	3–6				
1941	Providence	3–3–2				
Providence:		12–19–2				
Notre Dame Fighting Irish (Independent) (1945)
1945	Notre Dame	7–2–1				9
St. Bonaventure Bonnies (Western New York Little Three Conference) (1946–1949)
1946	St. Bonaventure	6–2	2–0	1st		
1947	St. Bonaventure	6–3				
1948	St. Bonaventure	7–1–1				
1949	St. Bonaventure	6–3	2–1	T–1st		
St. Bonaventure:		25–9–1				
NYU Violets (Independent) (1950–1952)
1950	NYU	1–5–1				
1951	NYU	1–7				
1952	NYU	2–5–1				
NYU:		4–17–2				
Dayton Flyers (Independent) (1954–1955)
1954	Dayton	5–5				
1955	Dayton	3–6–1				
Dayton:		8–11–1				
Notre Dame Fighting Irish (NCAA University Division independent) (1963)
1963	Notre Dame	2–7				
Notre Dame:		9–9–1				
Total:		58–65–8				
National championship Conference title Conference division title or championship game berth
^{#}Rankings from final AP Poll.

== See also ==
- List of college football head coaches with non-consecutive tenure
