= Jerry Delaney =

American football and track and field coach (b. 1873)

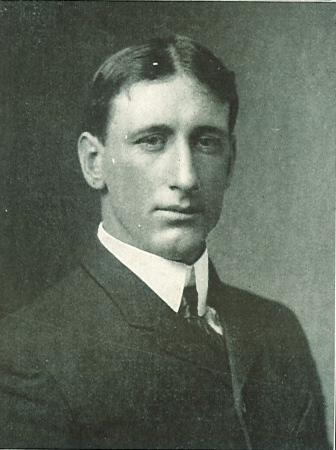
- Delaney from the 1906 Hawkeye

Biographical details
- Born: February 22, 1873; Worcester, Massachusetts, U.S.

Playing career

Football
- ?: Georgetown
- Position: End

Coaching career (HC unless noted)

Football
- 1903–1904: St. Bonaventure

Track and field
- 1901: Colgate
- 1904: Northwestern
- 1905: Iowa
- 1910: Iowa

Administrative career (AD unless noted)
- 1905: Iowa

Head coaching record
- Overall: 7–4 (football)

Jeremiah Daniel Delaney (February 22, 1873 – after 1940) was an American college football and track and field coach, athletics administrator, and sportswriter.

== Early life and playing career ==
A native of Worcester, Massachusetts, Delaney attended Georgetown University, where he ran track, played as an end on the Georgetown football team, and played as an outfielder on the Georgetown baseball team.

== Coaching career ==
Delaney was the sports editor of the Worcester Telegram. In 1901, he was hired as the track coach at Colgate University. Delaney served as the head football coach at St. Bonaventure University in Allegany, New York for two seasons, from 1903 and 1904, compiling a record of 7–4. In 1904, he succeeded Horace Butterworth as track coach at Northwestern University. The following year, Delaney went to the University of Iowa as athletic director and track coach.

== Family ==
Delaney was the brother of Martin Delaney, who also coached football and track.

== Head coaching record ==
=== Football ===
Year	Team	Overall	Conference	Standing	Bowl/playoffs
St. Bonaventure Brown and White (Independent) (1905–1906)
1903	St. Bonaventure	5–1			
1904	St. Bonaventure	2–3			
St. Bonaventure:		7–4			
Total:		7–4			
