= Norwich Township, Pennsylvania =

Township in Pennsylvania, US

Coordinates: 41°45′30″N 78°19′59″W

- Township
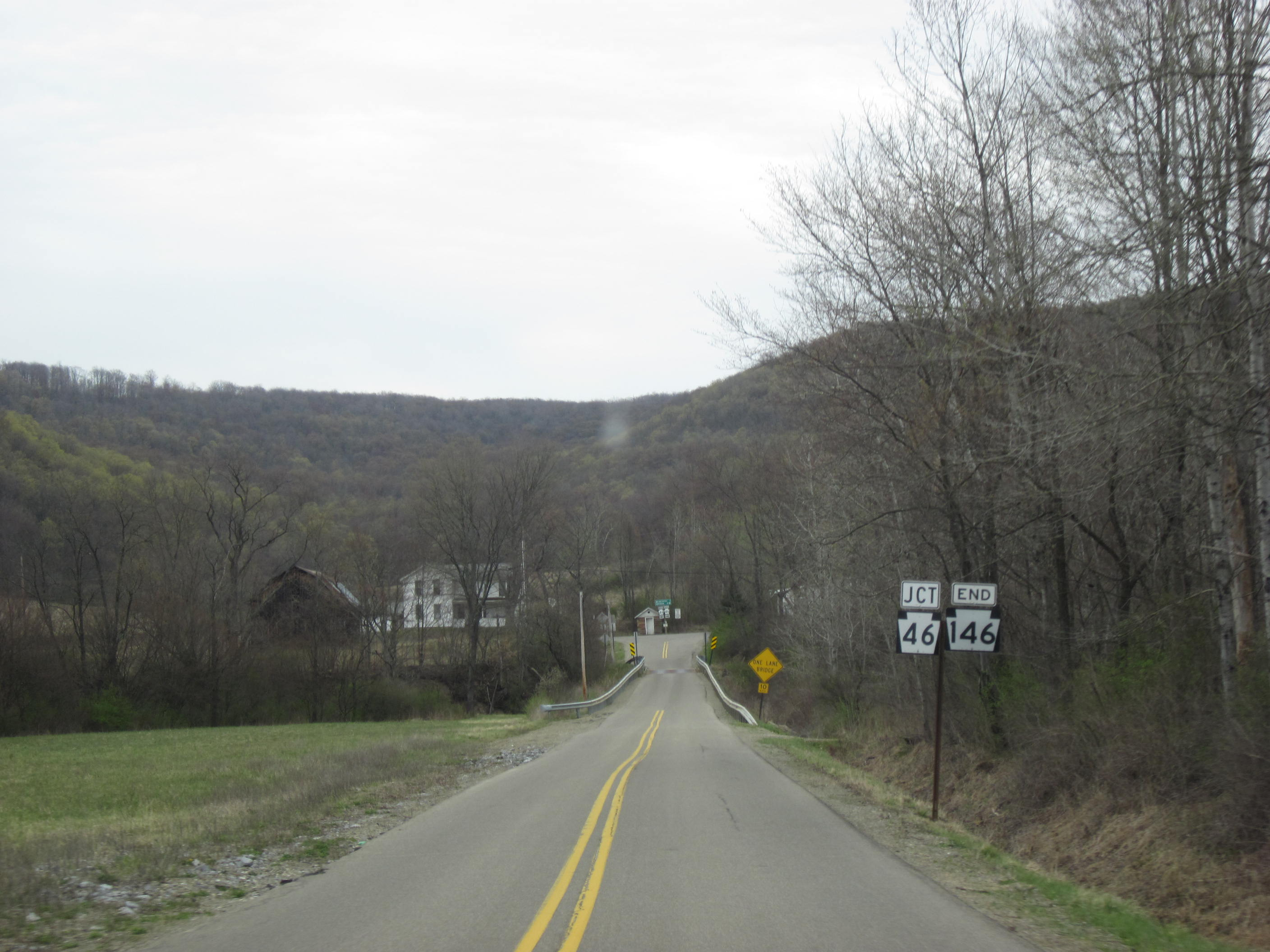
- Eastbound PA 146 in Norwich Township

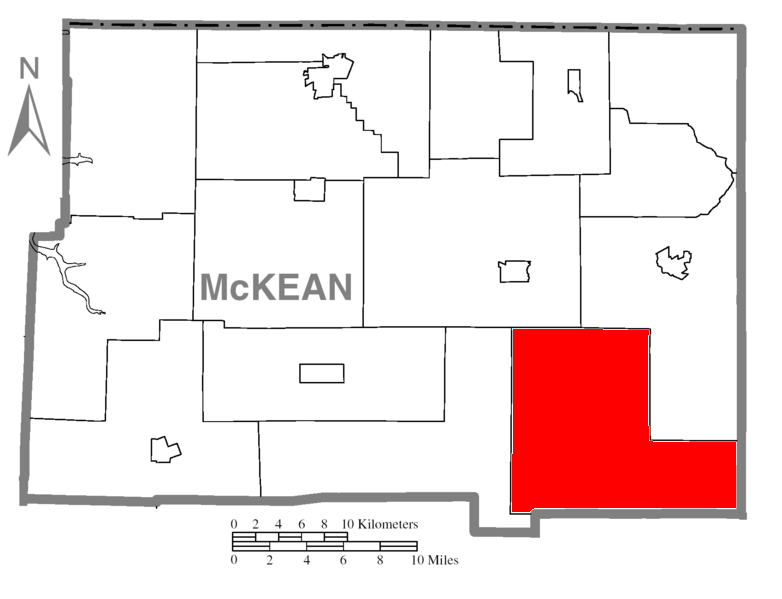
- Map of McKean County, Pennsylvania highlighting Norwich Township

- Map of McKean County, Pennsylvania
- Country: United States
- State: Pennsylvania
- County: McKean
- Settled: 1815
- Incorporated: 1835

Area
  - Total: 95.53 sq mi (247.43 km^{2})
  - Land: 95.33 sq mi (246.90 km^{2})
  - Water: 0.20 sq mi (0.53 km^{2})

Population (2020)
  - Total: 505 ▼
  - Estimate (2022): 493
  - Density: 5.9/sq mi (2.26/km^{2})
- Time zone: UTC-5 (Eastern (EST))
  - Summer (DST): UTC-4 (EDT)
- Area code: 814
- FIPS code: 42-083-55632

Norwich Township is a township in McKean County, Pennsylvania, United States. The population was 505 at the time of the 2020 census.

== Geography ==
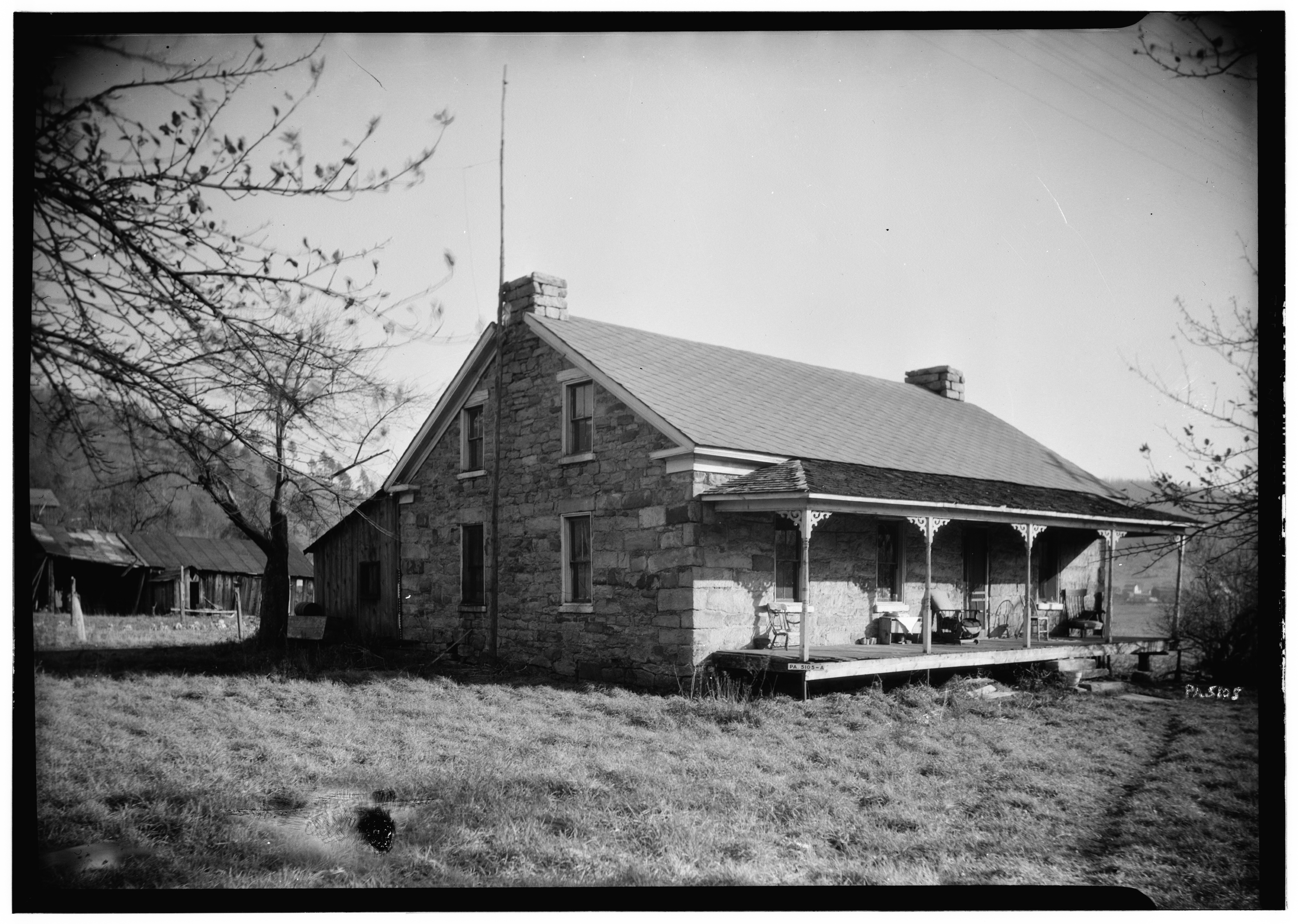
Marsh Stone House in Norwich Township

According to the United States Census Bureau, the township has a total area of 95.6 square miles (247.7 km^{2}), all of it land.

== Demographics ==
Historical population
Census	Pop.	Note	%±
2000	633		—
2010	583		−7.9%
2020	505		−13.4%
2022 (est.)	493		−2.4%
U.S. Decennial Census

As of the census of 2000, there were 633 people, 248 households, and 168 families residing in the township.

The population density was 6.6 people per square mile (2.6/km^{2}). There were 587 housing units at an average density of 6.1/sq mi (2.4/km^{2}).

The racial makeup of the township was 98.89% White, 0.95% Pacific Islander, and 0.16% from two or more races. Hispanic or Latino of any race were 0.95% of the population.

There were 248 households, out of which 33.5% had children under the age of 18 living with them, 51.6% were married couples living together, 9.7% had a female householder with no husband present, and 31.9% were non-families. 25.8% of all households were made up of individuals, and 12.5% had someone living alone who was 65 years of age or older.

The average household size was 2.55 and the average family size was 3.07.

In the township the population was spread out, with 26.9% under the age of 18, 6.8% from 18 to 24, 27.2% from 25 to 44, 24.5% from 45 to 64, and 14.7% who were 65 years of age or older. The median age was 39 years.

For every 100 females, there were 108.9 males. For every 100 females age 18 and over, there were 108.6 males.

The median income for a household in the township was $35,208, and the median income for a family was $37,750. Males had a median income of $28,611 compared with that of $21,719 for females.

The per capita income for the township was $14,879.

Roughly 2.3% of families and 7.0% of the population were below the poverty line, including 7.7% of those under age 18 and 3.3% of those age 65 or over.
