= Forness Stadium =

Former stadium in Saint Bonaventure, New York

- Owner: St. Bonaventure University
- Capacity: 12,000

Construction
- Built: 1946
- Opened: 1946
- Demolished: 1959

Forness Stadium was a stadium in Saint Bonaventure, New York. It opened in 1946 and was home to the St. Bonaventure University football team from 1946 to 1951.

The stadium was built in 1946 on New York State Route 17 (now Route 417) at the campus entrance west of Olean in a period of 77 days, largely built from stands transplanted to Olean from the Canisius Golden Griffins' football stadium after Canisius took up residence at Civic Stadium, where Saint Bonaventure had hoped to play marquee matchups if the football program's post-World War II revival was a success. It seated 12,000 persons and was named for former Olean mayor Fred Forness, who campaigned for the stadium. The construction of the stadium helped persuade Notre Dame football coach Hugh Devore to become St. Bonaventure's football coach starting with the 1946 season.

The stadium was dedicated on September 28, 1946, during a game against Youngstown. Youngstown won the game by a 20–14 score.

The final game in the stadium was also played against Youngstown, on November 3, 1951. St. Bonaventure won the final game by a 39–6 score. In February 1952, St. Bonaventure announced that it was suspending competition in intercollegiate football.

The stadium remained vacant for several years after the football program was suspended. The Pittsburgh Steelers used Forness for training camp for a period in the early 1950s. One sports writer described the stadium during this period as "lying there ever since, unburied, like Ebbetts Field, or Leadville or the old Slave Market in St. Augustine." In 1959 and 1960, the school dismantled the stadium in 1959. Portions of the bleachers went to Allegheny High School and Mount Morris. Other portions were sold at auction. Among the proposals to replace it was a new basketball arena, which eventually became the Reilly Center.
