= Bill Brooks (American football coach) =

American football player and coach (1945–2007)

Biographical details
- Born: February 27, 1945; Woodbury, New Jersey, U.S.
- Died: October 27, 2007 (aged 62); Greensboro, North Carolina, U.S.

Playing career
- 1963–1966: Gettysburg

Coaching career (HC unless noted)
- 1967–1969: Syracuse (GA)
- 1970–1971: Okinawa Service League
- 1972–1973: Staunton Military Academy (VA)
- 1974: Canisius (OC)
- 1975–1981: Canisius

William "Bill" Townsend Brooks (February 27, 1945 – October 27, 2007) was an entrepreneur, speaker, author, and American football player and coach.

Bill served as the head football coach at Canisius College from 1975 to 1981. He was a standout player at Gettysburg College in Gettysburg, Pennsylvania .

Bill founded The Brooks Group in 1977 in Greensboro, North Carolina. It was at the Brooks Group where he developed the IMPACT Selling® training program, which has since become the main service of the company.

== Career ==
After his professional career as a football coach, Bill Brooks transitioned into sales, where he eventually became a well-known sales trainer, speaker, and entrepreneur.

Brooks often stated that he had “raised himself from failure to success in sales.” Early in his sales career, he was fired from his first commission-only sales position. Determined to improve, he developed a practical and experience-driven approach to selling that emphasized real-world application over abstract theory.

In 1977, Brooks founded The Brooks Group in Greensboro, North Carolina. Through the company, he developed the IMPACT Selling® training system, a structured six-step sales methodology designed to help sales professionals build trust, identify customer needs, communicate value, present solutions, and close sales effectively.

Over the course of his career, Brooks authored more than 20 books on sales and sales management, including several bestsellers, and produced numerous audio training programs. He became widely recognized for his direct and practical teaching style, combining strategic sales concepts with hands-on experience.

Beyond his work as a sales consultant and entrepreneur, Brooks viewed himself primarily as a coach and mentor. He focused on helping sales professionals develop expertise, confidence, and the ability to teach others through their own experience and insights.

== Sales Hall of Fame Inductee ==
In 2011, Bill was inducted into the first-ever class of the Sales Hall of Fame for his contributions to professional selling, including his innovative approach to the sales process.

Other inductees included Tony Alessandra, Jeffrey Gitomer, Gerhard Gschwandtner, Earl Nightingale, Neil Rackham, Linda Richardson, Keith Rosen, Brian Tracy, and Zig Ziglar
