= New York State Conference =

- Founded: 1926
- Folded: 1934
- Sports fielded: College football, Men's basketball

The New York State Conference was an intercollegiate athletic conference that existed from 1926 to 1934. Originally known as "The Little Ten", the league had members in Upstate New York.

== Members ==
Institution	Location	Founded	Nickname	Joined	Left	Current conference
Alfred University	Alfred, New York	1836	Saxons	1926		Empire 8 (D-III)
University of Buffalo	Buffalo, New York	1846	Bulls	1926		MAC (D-I)
Canisius University	Buffalo, New York	1870	Golden Griffins			MAAC (D-I)
Clarkson University	Potsdam, New York	1896	Golden Knights	1926		Liberty League (D-III)
Hamilton College	Clinton, New York	1793	Continentals	1926	1934	NESCAC (D-III)
Hobart College	Geneva, New York	1822	Statesmen	1926	1934	Liberty League (D-III)
Niagara University	Lewiston, New York	1856	Purple Eagles	1926		MAAC (D-I)
University of Rochester	Rochester, New York	1850	Yellowjackets	1926	1934	UAA & Liberty League (D-III)
St. Bonaventure University	Allegany, New York	1858	Bonnies	1926		Atlantic 10 (D-I)
St. Lawrence University	Canton, New York	1856	Saints	1926		Liberty League (D-III)

== Football champions ==
- 1926 – Niagara
- 1927 – Niagara
- 1928 – Niagara
- 1929 – Niagara
- 1930 – Niagara
- 1931 – St. Lawrence
- 1932 – Clarkson
- 1933 – Unknown
- 1934 – Clarkson

== See also ==
- List of defunct college football conferences
