= Clarkson Golden Knights =

- University: Clarkson University
- Nickname: Golden Knights
- Association: Division III
- Conference: Liberty League, ECAC Hockey
- Athletic director: Laurel Kane
- Location: Potsdam, New York
- Varsity teams: 20
- Arena: Alumni Gymnasium
- Ice hockey arena: Cheel Arena
- Baseball stadium: Jack Phillips Stadium
- Colors: Green and gold
- Website: www.clarksonathletics.com
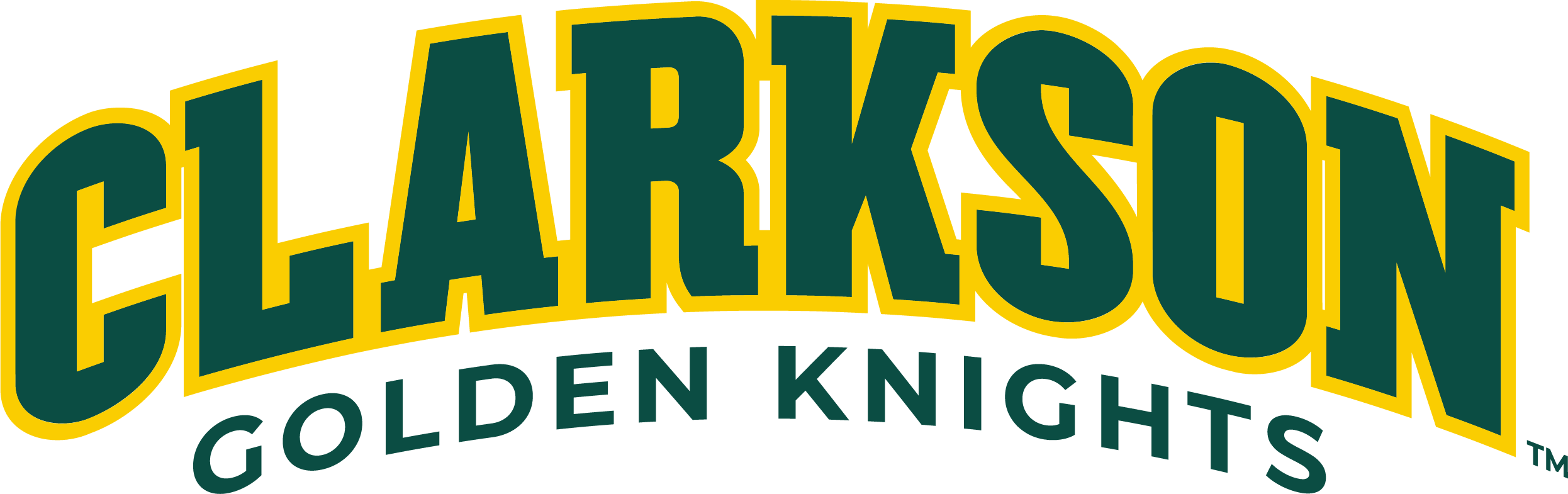

The Clarkson Golden Knights are composed of 20 teams representing Clarkson University in intercollegiate athletics, including men and women's alpine skiing, basketball, cross country, ice hockey, lacrosse, Nordic skiing, soccer, and swimming. Men's sports include baseball and golf. Women's sports include softball and volleyball. The Golden Knights compete in the NCAA Division III and are members of the Liberty League for all sports except ice hockey, which competes in NCAA Division I, as a member of ECAC Hockey.

== History ==
While Clarkson is an NCAA Division III school, both the men's and women's ice hockey teams compete in Division I, with both teams playing in the ECAC. The men's team is a traditional power in the ECAC. They have won 6 ECAC Tournament Championships, most recently in 2019. Clarkson's most recent NCAA tournament was as the number three seed in the 2008 NCAA East regional, where they knocked off St. Cloud State 2–1 to advance to the second round. The Golden Knights were then defeated by national number one seed, Michigan, 2–0.

The women's team is far younger, beginning play in 2003, than the men's team, although they too have become an ECAC power. The team has appeared in every tournament since entering the ECAC in 2004 and have appeared in three NCAA tournaments, most recently winning the 2018 edition, the third NCAA title won by the school, the third NCAA ice hockey title won by a school in St. Lawrence County, and the third Division I NCAA championship won by a school from the North Country.

== Sponsored sports ==
Other Division III varsity teams compete in the Liberty League conference and include baseball, men's and women's basketball, men's and women's cross country, men's golf, men's and women's lacrosse, men's and women's soccer, softball, men's and women's swimming, and women's volleyball.

The men and women's alpine skiing and Nordic skiing teams compete in the MacConnell Division of the Eastern Collegiate Ski Conference (ECSC), within the United States Collegiate Ski and Snowboard Association (USCSA). They are top contenders almost every year within their division and even conference, and have consistently qualified for the annual USCSA National Championships numerous times.

Men's sports	Women's sports
Alpine skiing	Alpine skiing
Baseball	Basketball
Basketball	Cross country
Cross Country	Ice hockey
Golf	Lacrosse
Ice hockey	Nordic skiing
Lacrosse	Soccer
Nordic Skiing	Softball
Soccer	Swimming & diving
Swimming & diving	Volleyball

== Club sports ==
Other non-varsity clubs include men's and women's ice hockey, men's lacrosse, men's and women's rugby union, men's soccer, men's bowling, combined men's and women's crew, and ultimate frisbee. Clarkson's combined men's and women's club racquetball team won the Division II title at the USRA National Tournament in 2005. In 2010, the school started a club football team.

== Facilities ==
Cheel Arena opened on October 26, 1991, is the 3,000-seat multi-purpose University's arena. It is named after Helen Snell Cheel, a long-time benefactor of Clarkson University, who provided a major gift towards the project.

Cheel Arena is home to the Clarkson Golden Knights men's and women's hockey programs, which play at the NCAA Division I level. Ice is maintained throughout a large portion of the year for campus and community usage ranging from intramural hockey and broomball, Section X High School Championships, and figure skating. When the ice is removed, the facility is used for Clarkson's graduation and other local events. Cheel Arena typically hosts a concert every April featuring several music and comedy acts, presented by Clarkson Union Board.

== Mascot ==
"The Golden Knight" is the university's hockey mascot, which can be seen at hockey games waving the Clarkson flag.
