= Niagara Purple Eagles football =

- First season: 1895; 131 years ago
- Last season: 1950; 76 years ago
- Location: Lewiston, New York
- NCAA division: University division
- Conference: Independent
- Colors: Purple and white
- All-time record: 181–205–31 (.471)

Conference championships
- 4
- Rivalries: Canisius Golden Griffins; St. Bonaventure Brown Indians

The Niagara Purple Eagles football program were the intercollegiate American football team for Niagara University located in Lewiston, New York. The school's first football team was fielded in 1895. Niagara participated in football from 1895 to 1950, compiling an all-time record of 181–205–31. The football program was discontinued at the conclusion of the 1950 season.

== Notable former players ==
Notable alumni include:

- Dan DeSantis: Halfback, Philadelphia Eagles 1941
- Al Gutknecht: Guard, Brooklyn Dodgers 1943, Cleveland Rams 1944
- John Tosi: Offensive lineman, Pittsburgh Pirates 1939, Brooklyn Dodgers 1939, Philadelphia Eagles 1944

== Championships ==
=== Conference championships ===
Conference affiliations:

- 1895–1925, Independent
- 1926–49, Western New York Little Three Conference
- 1950, Independent

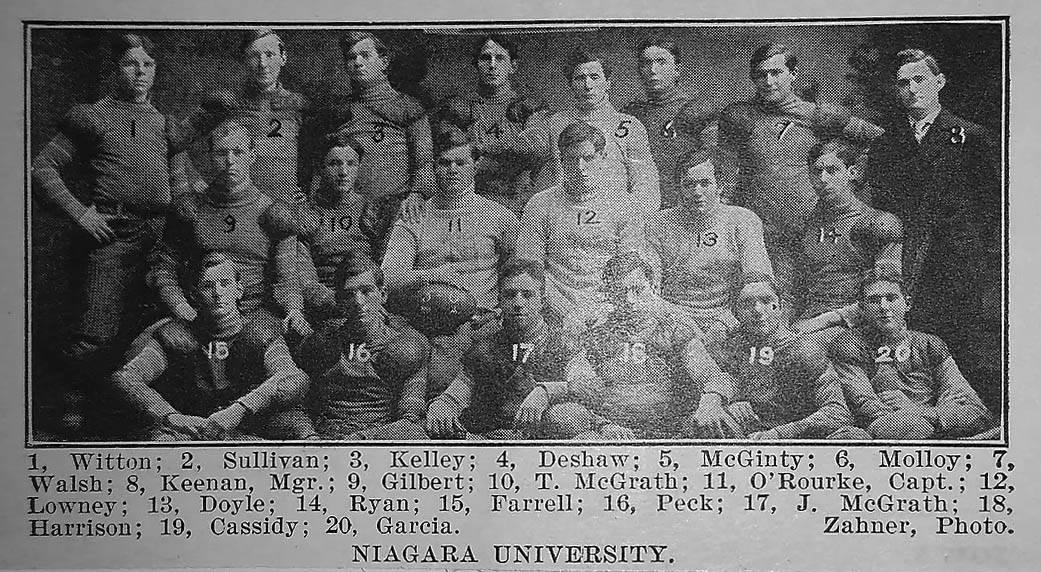
Niagara team of 1905

Year	Conference	Coach	Overall record	Conference record
1926	Western New York Little Three Conference	Pete Dwyer	4–3–1	2–0–0
1932	Western New York Little Three Conference	Shel Hecker	5–3–0	2–0–0
1938	Western New York Little Three Conference	Joe Bach	7–2–0	2–0–0
1940	Western New York Little Three Conference	Joe Bach	6–1–1	2–0–0
Total conference championships			4	
