= St. Bonaventure Brown Indians football =

- First season: 1895; 131 years ago
- Last season: 1951; 75 years ago
- Location: St. Bonaventure, New York
- Stadium: Forness Stadium
- NCAA division: University division
- Conference: Independent
- Colors: Brown and white
- All-time record: 161–157–26 (.506)
- Bowl record: 0–0 (–)

National championships
- Claimed: 0

Conference championships
- 6

Division championships
- 0
- Rivalries: Canisius Golden Griffins; Niagara Purple Eagles
- Website: GoBonnies.com

The St. Bonaventure University football program, commonly known as the Brown and White until 1931 and thereafter as the Brown Indians throughout the rest of the team's existence, was the intercollegiate American football team for St. Bonaventure University located in St. Bonaventure, New York. The team competed as an independent. The school's first football team was fielded in 1895. St. Bonaventure participated in football from 1895 to 1951, compiling an all-time record of 161–157–26. The football program was discontinued at the conclusion of the 1951 season.

A second St. Bonaventure football team played three seasons from 1968 to 1970; this squad played only at the club team level and not as a varsity squad. St. Bonaventure changed its athletics moniker from "Brown Indians" to "Bonnies" in 1992, several decades after the football team played its last game.

== History ==
For most of St. Bonaventure's history as an athletic school, football largely served as a secondary sport, with the squad's football players playing multiple other sports, including the team's basketball squad; the head coaches were also usually shared between sports. St. Bonaventure suspended its football program during World War II.

In 1946, under the directorship of Anselm Krieger, St. Bonaventure made a major expansion of its football program to accommodate an influx of students following the war, and constructed Forness Stadium on the campus's eastern edge in an effort to establish the Brown Indians as a major football school. The team enjoyed substantial success in the six years of post-war football under former Notre Dame coach Hugh Devore and, after Devore left in 1950, former and future Pittsburgh Steelers head coach Joe Bach (Steelers owner Art Rooney and Krieger's successor as Bona athletic director, Silas Rooney, were brothers). Despite the on-field success and frequent sellouts of the 12,000-seat stadium, St. Bonaventure opted not to continue sponsoring football after the 1951 season, citing high expenses and the shutdown of the schools' biggest rival football programs at Niagara and Canisius. Rooney would instead bring the Steelers to St. Bonaventure to use the stadium for training camp (the Steelers would also hire Bach as their head coach at the same time) for the next several years until the stadium was dismantled.

An attempt to launch a club football squad at St. Bonaventure in the late 1960s failed after three seasons due to lack of community interest.

== Notable former players ==
Notable alumni include:

- Jack Butler: Hall of Fame cornerback for the Pittsburgh Steelers, 1951–59
- Ted Marchibroda: Later NFL coach for the Indianapolis Colts (1992–95) and Baltimore Ravens (1996-98)
- Steve Hrycyszyn: (1937-1939) Later played for the Buffalo Tigers (1940) and Buffalo Indians (1941)

== Championships ==
=== Conference championships ===
Conference affiliations:

- 1895–1925, independent
- 1926–1949, Western New York Little Three Conference
- 1950–1951, independent

Year	Conference	Coach	Overall record	Conference record
1931	Western New York Little Three Conference	Mike Reilly	4–2–2	1–0–1
1933	Western New York Little Three Conference	Mike Reilly	4–2–2	1–0–1
1935	Western New York Little Three Conference	Mike Reilly	6–2–1	2–0
1941	Western New York Little Three Conference (co-championship)	Mike Reilly	3–5	1–1
1946	Western New York Little Three Conference	Hugh Devore	6–2	2–0
1949	Western New York Little Three Conference (co-championship)	Hugh Devore	6–3	2–1
Total conference championships			6

== See also ==
- St. Bonaventure Bonnies, for information on all St. Bonaventure University sports
- Rooney family
