= Western New York Little Three Conference =

Defunct athletic conference

- Conference: NCAA
- Founded: 1946
- Folded: 1958
- No. of teams: 3

Locations
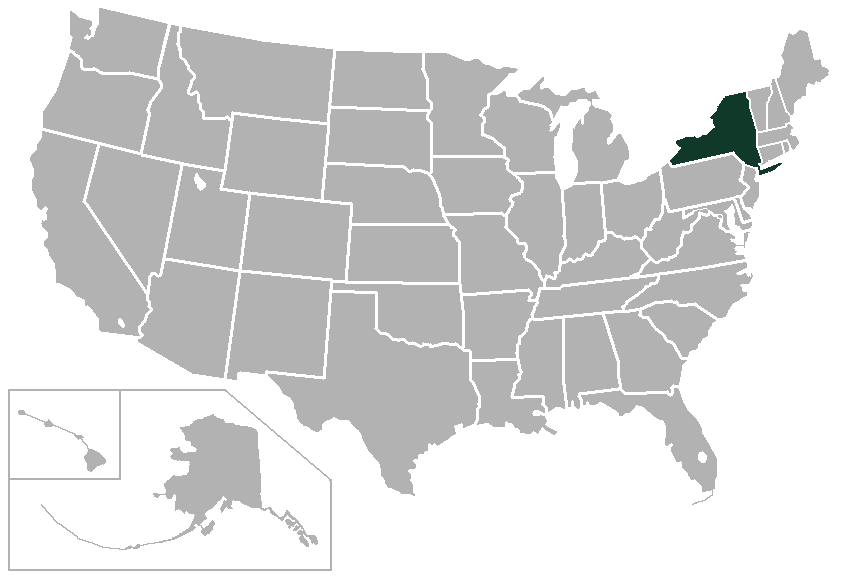

Locations in New York

The Western New York Little Three Conference was an athletic conference that existed from 1946 to 1958. Its three member schools, Canisius College, Niagara University, and St. Bonaventure University, are Roman Catholic institutions located in Western New York.

Although the conference itself no longer exists, the three schools remain rivals and retain the use of the "Little Three" moniker when playing each other, especially in basketball. Niagara and Canisius are now in the Metro Atlantic Athletic Conference and St. Bonaventure resides in the Atlantic 10 Conference. The three schools also maintain a rivalry with the public University at Buffalo (of the Mid-American Conference), the only other Division I college in the region; the four-way rivalry by extension is known as the "Big 4," and all four teams have regularly scheduled each other as part of their non-conference schedules since UB returned to Division I in 1993.

== Membership ==
- Canisius College (1946–1958), Jesuit school based in Buffalo, New York
- Niagara University (1946–1958), Vincentian school based in Lewiston, New York
- St. Bonaventure University (1946–1958), Franciscan school located near Olean, New York

== Champions ==
=== Men's basketball ===
- 1947 Canisius
- 1948 Niagara
- 1949 Niagara
- 1950 Canisius/Niagara/St. Bonaventure
- 1951 St. Bonaventure
- 1952 DNP
- 1953 Niagara
- 1954 Niagara
- 1955 Niagara
- 1956 Canisius
- 1957 Canisius/St. Bonaventure
- 1958 St. Bonaventure

=== Football ===
- 1926 Niagara (2–0)
- 1931 St. Bonaventure (1–0–1)
- 1932 Niagara (2–0)
- 1933 St. Bonaventure (1–0–1)
- 1934 Canisius (2–0)
- 1935 St. Bonaventure (2–0)
- 1936 Canisius (2–0)
- 1938 Niagara (2–0)
- 1939 Canisius (2–0)
- 1940 Niagara (2–0)
- 1941 Canisius/St. Bonaventure (1–1)
- 1946 St. Bonaventure (2–0)
- 1947 Canisius (2–0)
- 1948 Canisius (2–0)
- 1949 Canisius/St. Bonaventure (2–1)

Canisius suspended its football team after the 1949 season, Niagara did the same in 1950, and St. Bonaventure also did so in 1951. Canisius and Niagara reinstated their varsity football programs after the conference dissolved, then dissolved them permanently in 1987 and 2002, respectively.

== See also ==
- List of defunct college football conferences
