= List of St. Bonaventure University alumni =

This list of St. Bonaventure University alumni includes notable former students of St. Bonaventure University.

== Academics ==
- Marion Beiter, 1948, mathematician and chairwoman of the mathematics department of Rosary Hill College
- John R. Broderick, president of Old Dominion University
- Cara Cilano, chair professor of English at Michigan State University
- Charles J. Dougherty, 1971, president of Duquesne University
- William Fulton, mayor of Ventura, California, planning director for the City of San Diego, and head of the Kinder Institute for Urban Research at Rice University
- Edward Goljan, professor of pathology at Oklahoma State University College of Osteopathic Medicine
- John Robert Greene, 1977, 1978 (g), author and professor emeritus, history and humanities, Cazenovia College
- James L. Hayes, dean of the School of Business Administration at Duquesne University
- Daniel Horan, Catholic priest, theologian, and director of the Center for Spirituality and professor of philosophy, Religious Studies, and Theology at Saint Mary's College
- Robert Kochersberger, 1972, associate professor of English at North Carolina State University
- Charles Kupchella, 1968 PhD, president of the University of North Dakota
- Michael Lynch, population geneticist and academic at Indiana University
- James Post, professor at Boston University
- Irena Scott, physiologist, professor, and author
- Max Wickert, poet, translator, and professor of English Emeritus at the University at Buffalo

== Art and architecture ==
- Anthony Bannon, 1964, former director of George Eastman House and director of Burchfield-Penney Art Center
- Cajetan J. B. Baumann, 1941, Franciscan friar, architect

== Business ==
- Ed Bastian, 1979, chief executive officer of Delta Air Lines
- Deb Henretta, 1983, global president of e-commerce for Procter & Gamble
- Jim Meyer, chief financial officer at Thermo Fisher Scientific
- Carl Paladino, chairman of Ellicott Development Co.

== Clergy ==
- John Boland, Roman Catholic priest involved in unionization and other social justice issues in Buffalo, New York
- Stanislaus Joseph Brzana, prelate of the Catholic Church who served as the tenth bishop of the Diocese of Ogdensburg, New York
- Joseph W. Estabrook, prelate of the Roman Catholic Church who served as an auxiliary bishop of the Archdiocese for the Military Services and also Titular Bishop of Flenucleta
- John Mark Gannon, 1899, Catholic Titular Archbishop of Tacarata, Bishop of Erie, and Titular Bishop of Nilopolis
- Richard Thomas Guilfoyle, prelate of the Roman Catholic Church who served as the third bishop of the Diocese of Altoona, Pennsylvania
- Daniel W. Herzog, 1964, Episcopal Bishop Emeritus of Albany
- Louis Iasiello, 1972, Catholic priest who served as the 23rd Chief of Chaplains of the United States Navy
- Mychal Judge, Franciscan friar and Catholic priest who served as a chaplain to the New York City Fire Department
- William John Kenny, prelate of the Roman Catholic Church and bishop of the Diocese of St. Augustine in Florida
- John J. McMahon, prelate of the Roman Catholic Church and bishop of the Diocese of Trenton in New Jersey
- Sixtus O'Connor, priest and served as pastor during the Nuremberg Trials to Catholic prison inmates
- Paschal Robinson, 1896, titular archbishop of Tyana, the first apostolic nuncio to Ireland, and professor of Medieval History at The Catholic University of America
- Francis Joseph Tief, 1905, prelate of the Catholic Church and bishop of the Diocese of Concordia in Kansas
- Thomas Walsh, prelate of the Catholic Church and the first archbishop of the Archdiocese of Newark

== Entertainment ==
- Neil Cavuto, 1980, news anchor for Fox News and Fox Business
- Victoria Corderi, 1979, correspondent for Dateline NBC, recipient of three national news Emmys, a George Foster Peabody Award for Excellence in Journalism, and the Edward R. Murrow Award
- Francis Cullinan, stage director of opera, musical theater, dramas, comedies and cabaret shows
- Brent Hanks, 2007, sports commentator and professional poker player
- Fred McCarthy, cartoonist and creator of the Brother Juniper single-panel comic strip
- Adrian Wojnarowski, 1991, Senior NBA Insider at ESPN, and three-time National Sports Media Association Sportswriter of the Year

== Law ==
- Richard Arcara, 1962, senior United States district judge of the United States District Court for the Western District of New York
- Peter Campbell Brown, 1951, assistant United States attorney for the Eastern District of New York, city commissioner of Investigations, and corporation counsel
- Morgan J. Burke Jr., non-degreed, attorney and judge
- J. Daniel Mahoney, 1952, United States circuit judge of the United States Court of Appeals for the Second Circuit
- Mark Tuohey, 1969, attorney and director of the mayor of Washington D.C.'s Office of Legal Counsel

== Literature and journalism ==
- Dan Barry 1980, reporter for The New York Times who won the Pulitzer Prize in 1994 for investigative reporting
- Janet Bodnar, 1971, editor of Kiplinger's Personal Finance and journalist with The Washington Post
- Kathleen Brady, 1968, author and journalist
- Charlene Costanzo, inspirational author and speaker
- John Curran, journalist and news correspondent with the Associated Press
- William C. Davis Jr., 1941, writer and editor on ballistics for American Rifleman magazine
- JG Faherty, 1984, author who writes in the horror, science fiction, and dark fantasy genres
- Charles J. Hanley 1968, reporter for the Associated Press who won the Pulitzer Prize in 2000 for investigative reporting
- Dan Herbeck, 1978, journalist and investigative reporter at The Buffalo News
- Patricia Kennealy-Morrison, author, journalist, editor
- Leah McGrath Goodman, 1998, writer and editor for The Wall Street Journal, Dow Jones Newswires, and Barron's
- Greg Mitchell, 1970, author, editor, and Goldsmith Book Prize recipient
- Mike Vaccaro, 1989, lead sports columnist for The New York Post
- Vincent Virga, 1964, novelist and editor

== Medicine and science ==
- Kevin O'Connor, physician and retired U.S. Army colonel serving as the physician to the president

== Military ==
- Patrick Frank, 1989, United States Army lieutenant general

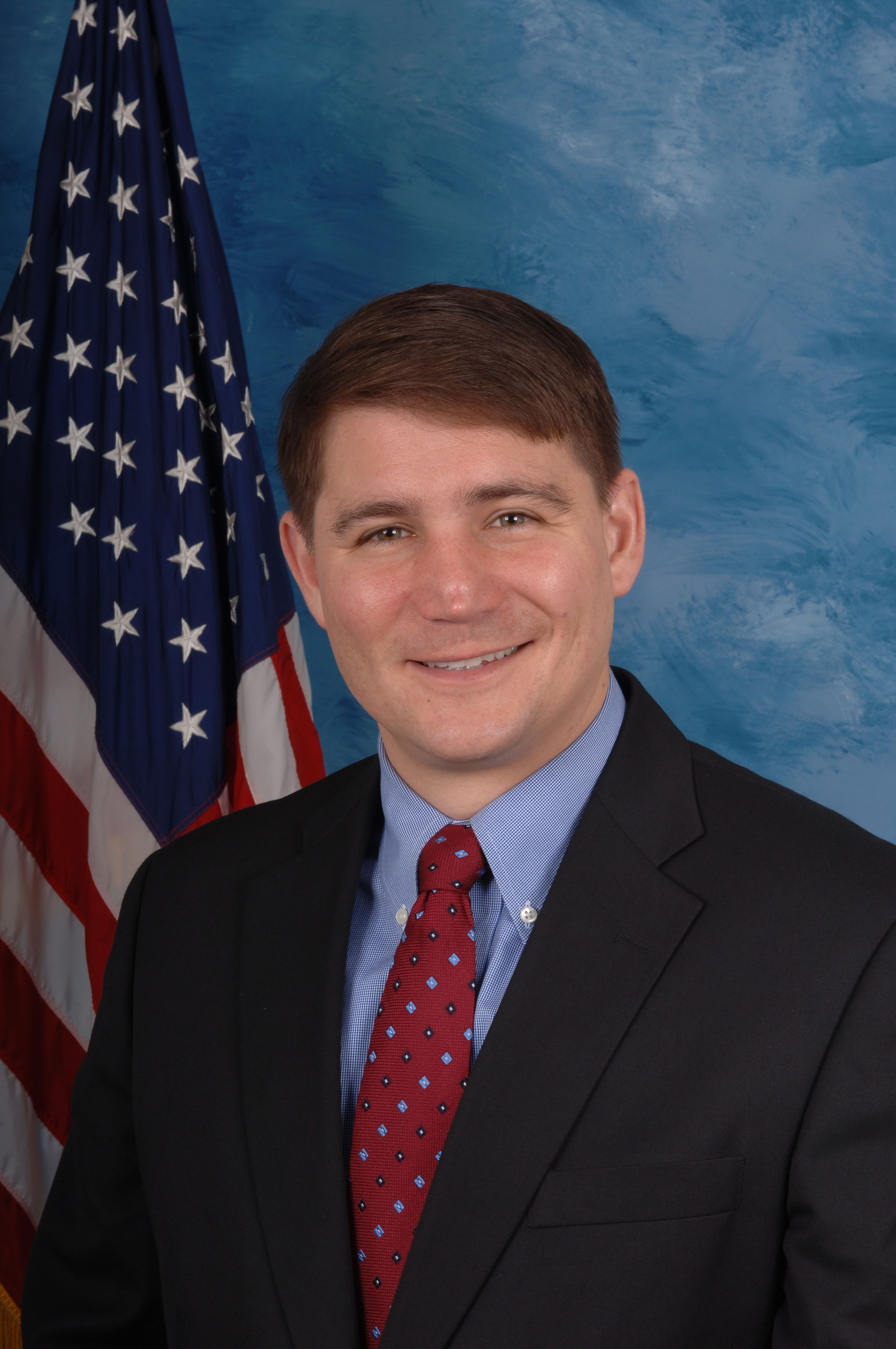
John Boccieri

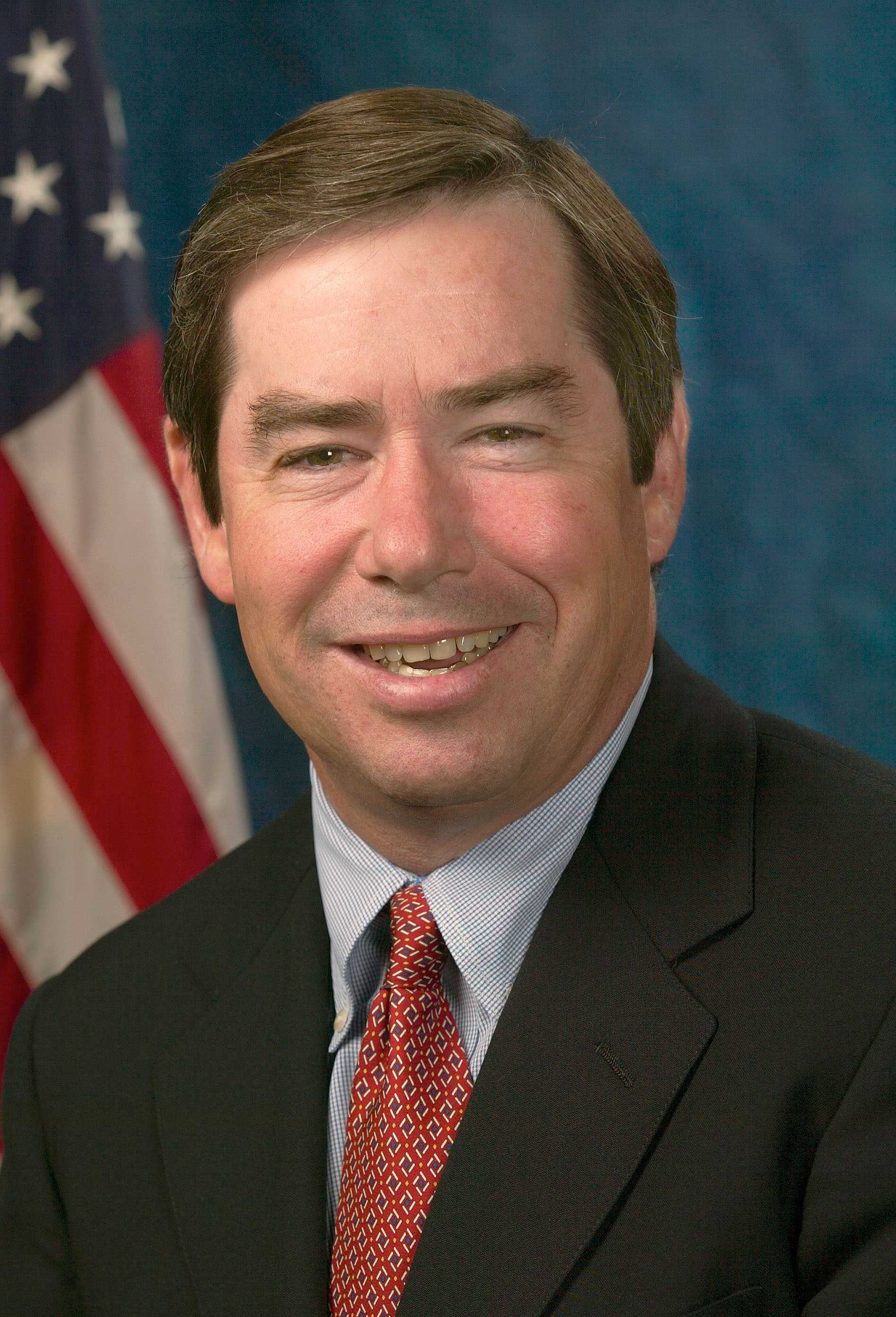
James T. Walsh

== Politics ==
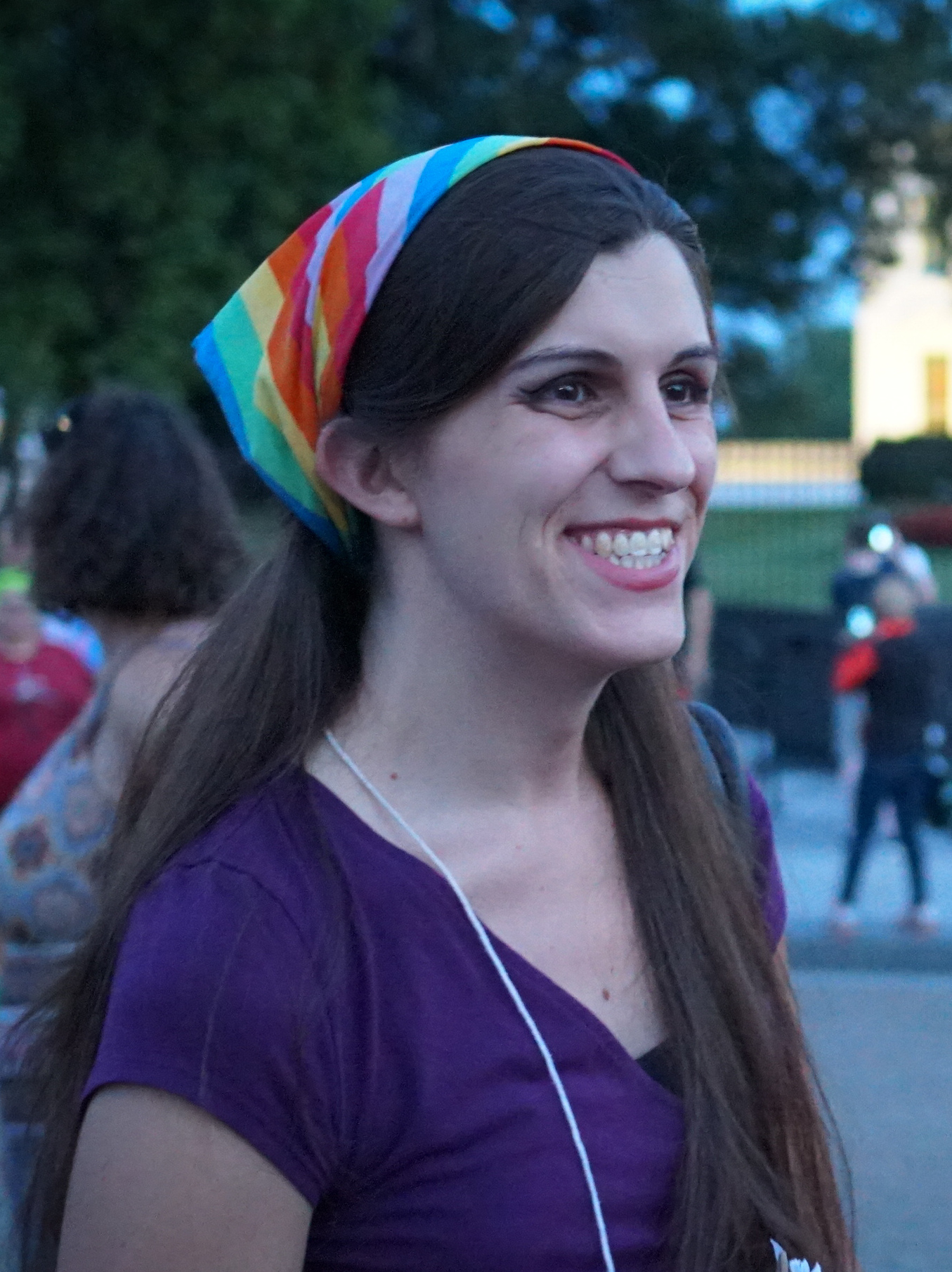
State Sen. Danica Roem

- Fred M. Ahern, New York State Assembly
- Frank E. Baldwin, Pennsylvania State Senate and Pennsylvania auditor general
- John Boccieri,1992, U.S. House of Representatives, Ohio State Senate, and the Ohio House of Representatives
- Erik Bohen, New York State Assembly
- Jeffrey M. Conrad, Buffalo Common Council
- James J. Howard,1952, U.S. House of Representatives
- Peter J. Larkin, Massachusetts House of Representatives
- James Libby, Maine Senate
- John G. A. O'Neil, New York State Assembly
- Phil Palmesano, 1991, New York State Assembly
- Danica Roem, Virginia House of Delegates and Virginia State Senate
- Patrick J. Ryan, 1884, New York State Assembly and municipal court judge
- Thomas P. Ryan Jr., mayor of Rochester, New York
- Rudolph G. Tenerowicz, non-degreed, U.S. House of Representatives
- Daniel B. Walsh, New York State Assembly
- James T. Walsh, 1970, U.S. House of Representatives
- William F. Walsh, 1934, U.S. House of Representatives
- Catharine Young, New York state senator
- John Zajac Jr., Connecticut House of Representatives and the Connecticut State Senate

== Sports ==
=== Baseball ===
- John Burke, professional baseball player
- George Daly, professional baseball player
- Connor Grey, professional baseball player with the New York Mets
- Bud Heine, professional baseball player
- Hughie Jennings, professional baseball player, coach and manager
- Frank Loftus, professional baseball player
- Greg Mamula, college baseball coach
- Jim McCloskey, professional baseball player
- Danny McDevitt, professional baseball player
- John McGraw, Major League baseball manager
- Kid McLaughlin, professional baseball player
- Paul Owens, professional baseball player and general manager
- B. J. Salerno, college baseball coach
- George Susce, professional baseball player

=== Basketball ===
- Jaylen Adams, professional basketball player
- Jalen Adaway, professional basketball player
- Ogo Adegboye, professional basketball player
- Miles Aiken, professional basketball player
- Jim Baron, college basketball coach
- Earl Belcher, professional basketball player
- J. R. Bremer, professional basketball player
- Izaiah Brockington, professional basketball player
- George Carter, professional basketball player
- Norman Clarke, professional basketball player
- Demitrius Conger, professional basketball player
- Abdoul Karim Coulibaly, college basketball player and member of the Mali national basketball team
- Freddie Crawford, professional basketball player
- Chuck Daly, professional basketball coach
- Fred Diute, professional basketball player
- Eddie Donovan, professional basketball player, coach, and general manage
- Terrence Durham, 1999, professional basketball player
- Mike Gansey, professional basketball player and general manager for the Cleveland Cavaliers
- Glenn Hagan, 1978, professional basketball player
- Essie Hollis, professional basketball player
- Jaren Holmes, college basketball player
- Mark Jones, professional basketball player
- Bill Kenville, professional basketball player
- Ed Klimkowski, professional basketball player and coach
- Charlon Kloof, professional basketball player
- Bob Lanier, professional basketball player and inductee in the Naismith Memorial Basketball Hall of Fame
- Rob Lanier, college basketball coach
- Michael Lee, professional basketball player
- Kyle Lofton, professional basketball player
- Whitey Martin, professional basketball player
- Brendan McCann, professional basketball player
- Matt Mobley, professional basketball player
- Barry Mungar, professional basketball player
- Ken Murray, professional basketball player
- Youssou Ndoye, professional basketball player
- Andrew Nicholson, professional basketball player
- Osun Osunniyi, professional basketball player
- Peter van Paassen, professional basketball player
- Marcus Posley, professional basketball player
- Patricio Prato, professional basketball player
- Mike Reilly, head football and head basketball coach at St. Bonaventure University
- Tyler Relph, college basketball player and trainer
- Robert Sassone, 1953, college basketball coach
- Jim Satalin, college basketball coach and the current radio play-by-play announcer
- Marquise Simmons, professional basketball player
- Sam Stith, professional basketball player
- Tom Stith, professional basketball player
- David Vanterpool, professional basketball player and coach
- Larry Weise, head basketball coach at St. Bonaventure University
- Dominick Welch, professional basketball player
- Bill Whitmore, college basketball coach
- Tim Winn, professional basketball player
- Matthew Wright, professional basketball player

=== Football ===
- Jack Butler, professional football player and NFL Hall of Fame
- Matt Conte, college football coach
- Johnny Gildea, professional football player with the Pittsburgh Steelers and the New York Giants
- Hank Goodman, professional football player with the Detroit Lions
- George Hays, professional football player
- Al Kaporch, professional football player with the Detroit Lions
- George Kenneally, professional football player
- Frank LoVuolo, professional football player with the New York Giants.
- Ted Marchibroda, professional football player and coach
- Hugo Marcolini, professional football player with the Brooklyn Dodgers
- George Nicksich, professional football player with the Pittsburgh Steelers
- Mike Reilly, head football and head, basketball coach at St. Bonaventure University
- Drip Wilson, professional football player with the Cleveland Indians
- Stan Zajdel, professional football player and college football coach

=== Golf ===
- Sam Urzetta, professional golfer

=== Lacrosee ===
- Brett Dobson, professional Lacrosse Player

=== Swimming ===
- Ayse Diker, Olympic swimmer

=== Wrestling ===
- Ed Don George, wrestler who participated in the 1928 Amsterdam Olympics and two-time AWA World Heavyweight Champion

=== Rugby ===
- Kyle Ciquera, professional rugby player

== Other ==
- Charles J. Ducey, deputy Supreme Knight of the Knights of Columbus
- Joseph Scott, 1914 LL.D, attorney and vice-president of the Panama–California Exposition
- Denise Doring VanBuren, 1983, 45th president of the Daughters of the American Revolution
