= Isaiah Washington (basketball) =

American basketball player (born 1998)

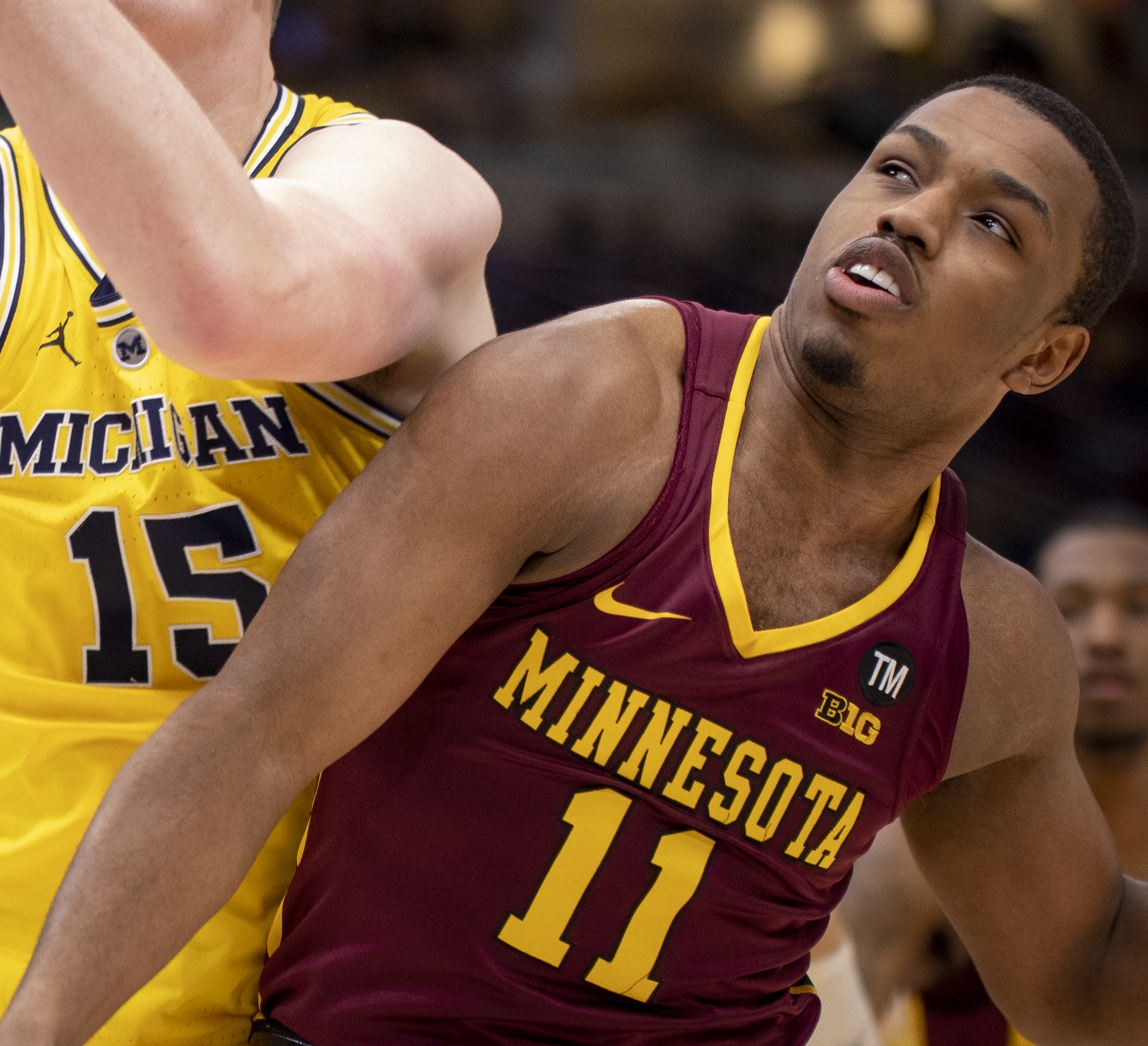
- Washington with the Minnesota Golden Gophers in 2019

Personal information
- Born: July 20, 1998 (age 28) Manhattan, New York, U.S.
- Listed height: 6 ft 1 in (1.85 m)
- Listed weight: 194 lb (88 kg)

Career information
- High school: St. Raymond (The Bronx, New York)
- College: Minnesota (2017–2019); Iona (2019–2020); Long Beach State (2020–2021)
- NBA draft: 2021: undrafted
- Playing career: 2021–present
- Position: Point guard

Career history
- 2021–2022: Lovćen 1947
- 2022–2023: Spišskí Rytieri
- 2023: Skyliners Frankfurt
- 2023–2024: Würzburg Baskets
- 2024–2025: SLUC Nancy Basket
- 2025: CS Antonine
- 2025–2026: Nizhny Novgorod
- 2026: Zaragoza

Career highlights
- Mr. New York Basketball (2017)

Isaiah Washington (born July 20, 1998) is an American professional basketball player who last played for Basket Zaragoza of the Liga ACB. He played for St. Raymond High School for Boys in The Bronx, where he was named Mr. New York Basketball in 2017. Washington co-founded and popularized Jelly Fam, a social media movement that emphasizes creative finger roll layups. He played college basketball for the Minnesota Golden Gophers, Iona Gaels, and Long Beach State.

== Early life ==
Washington was born and raised in Harlem, a neighborhood in the New York City borough of Manhattan. He grew up playing basketball at Dunlevy Milbank Children's Center in Harlem. In junior high school, Washington and his friend, Ja'Quaye James, along with Jahvon Quinerly, began calling themselves "Jelly Fam." The phrase became popular among basketball players through social media and was centered around fancy finger roll layups called "jelly." Washington trademarked the name.

== High school career ==
Washington played basketball for St. Raymond High School for Boys in The Bronx, a borough of New York City. On August 26, he shared most valuable player (MVP) honors at the Elite 24 All-American Game after scoring 36 points. As a senior, he averaged 26 points and six assists per game. Washington scored a season-high 54 points in a 91–83 loss to Cardinal Hayes High School. He finished his career as St. Raymond's all-time leading scorer with 1,410 points, surpassing Darryl Bryant, and was named Mr. New York Basketball, becoming the fourth point guard to ever win the award.

=== Recruiting ===
Washington was a consensus four-star recruit and the highest rated New York point guard in the 2017 class. He committed to play college basketball for Minnesota over offers from several other NCAA Division I programs.

College recruiting
Name	Hometown	School	Height	Weight	Commit date
Isaiah Washington; PG	Harlem, NY	St. Raymond (NY)	6 ft 1 in (1.85 m)	160 lb (73 kg)	Sep 11, 2016
Isaiah Washington; PG	Recruit ratings: Rivals: 247Sports: ESPN: (85)				
Overall recruit ranking: Rivals: 62 247Sports: 65 ESPN: 68
Note: In many cases, Scout, Rivals, 247Sports, On3, and ESPN may conflict in their listings of height and weight.; In these cases, the average was taken. ESPN grades are on a 100-point scale.; Sources: "Minnesota 2017 Basketball Commitments". Rivals.; "2017 Minnesota Golden Gophers Recruiting Class". ESPN.; "2017 Team Ranking". Rivals.

== College career ==
On November 10, 2017, Washington made his collegiate debut, recording four points and five assists on 1-of-9 shooting for Minnesota in a 92–77 victory over USC Upstate. On February 3, 2018, he scored a career-high 26 points in a 76–73 overtime loss to Michigan. It was the highest-scoring performance by a Minnesota freshman in Big Ten Conference play since Kris Humphries in 2004. He was subsequently named Big Ten freshman of the week. As a freshman, Washington played 32 games and averaged 8.7 points, 2.6 rebounds and 2.3 assists per game, shooting 36.6 percent from the field. On December 11, 2018, during his sophomore season, he posted his first double-double, with 14 points and a career-high 13 assists in an 80–71 win over North Florida. Washington averaged 4.3 points and 2.8 assists on 31.1 percent shooting as a sophomore and received less playing time due to the emergence of Gabe Kalscheur.

For his junior season, he transferred to Iona, moving closer to his hometown of Harlem to spend time with his ailing grandmother, and was granted immediate eligibility by the NCAA. In his first eight games, Washington averaged 7.8 points per game and shot 28 percent on three-pointers, but he grew more comfortable with his teammates and improved his statistics as the season progressed. On January 26, 2020, he tallied 25 points and 10 rebounds in a 94–88 loss to Monmouth. On February 27, Washington posted the third triple-double in Iona history with 14 points, 11 assists, and 10 rebounds in an 86–65 win over Canisius. Washington averaged 11.4 points, 5.1 rebounds, and 4.0 assists per game. On May 21, 2020, he entered the transfer portal as part of a mutual agreement with new head coach Rick Pitino and his staff.

On June 15, 2020, Washington announced that he was transferring to Long Beach State. As a senior, he averaged 13.7 points and 4.9 rebounds per game.

== Professional career ==
After going undrafted in the 2021 NBA draft, Washington signed with Lovćen 1947 of the ABA League Second Division and the Prva A Liga.

On August 12, 2022, Washington signed with Spišskí Rytieri of the Slovak Basketball League.

On January 8, 2023, Washington signed with Skyliners Frankfurt of the Basketball Bundesliga.

On June 8, 2024, he signed with SLUC Nancy Basket of the LNB Pro A.

In 2025, Washington played for CS Antonine of the Lebanese Basketball League and Nizhny Novgorod of the VTB United League.

On January 27, 2026, Washington signed with Basket Zaragoza of the Liga ACB and EuroCup. Zaragoza announced it was parting ways with Washington on May 18, 2026.

== Career statistics ==
Legend
GP	Games played	GS	Games started	MPG	Minutes per game
FG%	Field goal percentage	3P%	3-point field goal percentage	FT%	Free throw percentage
RPG	Rebounds per game	APG	Assists per game	SPG	Steals per game
BPG	Blocks per game	PPG	Points per game	**Bold**	Career high

=== College ===
Year	Team	GP	GS	MPG	FG%	3P%	FT%	RPG	APG	SPG	BPG	PPG
2017–18	Minnesota	**32**	4	20.0	.366	.241	.765	2.6	2.3	.6	.1	8.7
2018–19	Minnesota	28	0	16.1	.311	.213	.704	1.6	2.8	.5	.1	4.3
2019–20	Iona	28	**23**	33.3	.406	**.331**	**.803**	**5.1**	4.0	**1.7**	**.3**	11.4
2020–21	Long Beach	16	16	**33.5**	**.434**	.302	.773	4.9	**4.8**	1.1	.1	**13.7**
Career		104	43	24.6	.373	.282	.770	3.4	3.3	1.0	.1	9.0
