= Gaywyck =

1980 gothic novel

- Author: Vincent Virga
- Language: English
- Publication date: 1980

Gaywyck is a 1980 Gothic romance novel by Vincent Virga that was marketed as the first gay Gothic novel.

== Plot ==
Set in 1899, Gaywyck follows seventeen-year-old Robert Whyte who moves from rural upstate New York to Gaywyck, the Long Island mansion of Donough Gaylord, a wealthy man with a mysterious and tragic past.

== Background ==
Virga started writing Gaywyck in 1975 after becoming frustrated with the portrayal of gay men only as villains in recent Gothic fiction. His intention was to write a classic Gothic novel with the only difference being that the protagonist was a man instead of a woman. The completed manuscript was rejected 15 times before being accepted for publication by Avon. In November 1979, New York magazine included a brief note about its upcoming publication, calling it "history's first homosexual gothic."

== Reception ==
The novel received generally positive reviews. John Allec wrote in The Body Politic: "Gaywyck manages to exploit the appeal of this very familiar genre and, without ever stooping to camp or to parody, give us a tale which is both intrinsically gay and compulsively readable." Duncan Mitchel in Gay Community News called it "a novel about gay men which is fun to read... It even has a reasonably credible happy ending. That alone is enough to make me wish Gaywyck had been around when I was in high school." Peter Burton in Gay News described it as "over-the-top outrageous camp... An unmissable treat for anyone wanting light relief from the gloom of the real world." Richard Labonté wrote for the Ottawa Citizen that it was "adroit enough to appease the gothic fan and crafted enough to entice any reader, gay or not, who appreciates a sly parody," and Roger Austen in The Advocate termed it "an extraordinary tour de force." In a less effusive review, Terry Sanderson wrote in 1987, "There is a bewildering array of quite superfluous secondary plots and characters and attempts to capture the language of the time make the prose a little overripe. ...Gaywyck is easy to send up, but for all that it has a certain charm." A Library Journal review was even harsher, dismissing it as "Laden with excessive exposition and gratuitous description" and "dull and slow-moving."

Gaywyck was notable enough to receive mention in several nonfiction books soon after its publication. Michele Slung's chapter on the Gothic in Whodunit? A Guide to Crime, Suspense, and Spy Fiction (1982) described it as one of the most interesting gothics of the past decade and a notable example of the genre written by a male author. Two "how to write romance" books from the 1980s cited Gaywyck as an example of a successful gothic gay romance; Marilyn Lowery called it "a fine example of what a Gothic should be," and Kathryn Falk wrote (in a book first published in 1983), "The mass-readership response was quite positive. The book has been used in some writing courses, which discussed its literary value and power to evoke the turn of the century. (Virga's detailed research is quite thorough and exemplary.)"

Gaywyck's first printing of 45,000 sold out and earned it a second printing of 55,000. In 1984, it was one of the books seized in the Operation Tiger raid on Gay's the Word bookshop. In 2021, writer Greg Herren listed it as one of his favorite Gothic novels.

== Publication history ==
First published by Avon, the book was reissued by Gay Men's Press in 1987. In 2001 it was republished by Alyson Books, and in 2009 by BookSurge Publishing. In 2025 it was republished by ReQueered Tales.

== Social significance ==
Gaywyck was such a phenomenon that many publications have inaccurately cited it as the first gay romance novel, both shortly after its publication and years later. It is in fact not even the first gay Gothic novel, as the 1969 Gay Nights at Maldelangue by Peter Tuesday Hughes has since been identified as an earlier example. This does not diminish Gaywyck's legacy, however. Justin Tate writes:

For queer readership [...] Gaywyck was deeply meaningful. Virga learned privately that his novel was a favorite of Truman Capote, who ‘read it aloud every Christmas’. Then, as the 1980s progressed and gay men were slaughtered by a new virus colloquially known as ‘gay cancer’, it was Gaywyck which many clutched in their dying hands for comfort. Though the novel was a mass-market paperback from a minor publisher, its mainstream appeal and unashamed cover art made it a symbol: someday – maybe someday soon – gay love will be seen as legitimate.

In The Gothic Romance Wave: A Critical History of the Mass Market Novels, 1960-1993 (2018), Lori A. Paige notes that paperback gothic novels were waning in popularity at the time that Gaywyck was published, but that Gaywyck "forge[d] a new path for diverse popular fiction."
