= Mr. New York Basketball =

Prestigious basketball award in the US State of New York

Mr. New York Basketball is an award presented to a senior high school basketball player living in the state of New York. It is awarded by the Basketball Coaches Association of New York, and is considered to be very prestigious.

== Award winners ==
Year	Player	High School	College	NBA/ABA Draft
2026	Jasiah Jervis	Archbishop Stepinac High School	Michigan State	
2025	Kiyan Anthony	Long Island Lutheran	Syracuse	
2024	Boogie Fland	Archbishop Stepinac High School	Arkansas, transferred to Florida	
2023	Brandon Gardner	Christ the King	USC, transferred to Arizona State, then to Sacramento State	
2022	Jaquan Sanders	Our Saviour Lutheran School	Seton Hall, transferred to Hofstra, then to Florida A&M	
2021	Jordan Riley	Brentwood High School	Georgetown, transferred to Temple, then to East Carolina	
2020	R. J. Davis	Archbishop Stepinac High School	North Carolina	
2019	Joseph Girard III	Glens Falls High School	Syracuse, transferred to Clemson	
2018	Savion Lewis	Half Hollow Hills East	Quinnipiac	
2017	Isaiah Washington	St. Raymond	Minnesota, transferred to Iona, then to Long Beach State	
2016	Kevin Huerter	Shenendehowa	Maryland	2018 NBA draft: 1st Rd, 19th overall by the Atlanta Hawks
2015	Matt Ryan	Iona Prep	Notre Dame transferred to Vanderbilt, graduate transferred to Tennessee–Chattanooga	2020 NBA draft: Undrafted, signed two-way contract with the Boston Celtics in 2022
2014	Isaiah Whitehead	Abraham Lincoln	Seton Hall	2016 NBA draft: 2nd Rnd, 42nd Overall by the Utah Jazz traded to the Brooklyn Nets
2013	Jon Severe	Christ the King	Fordham transferred to Iona	
2012	DaJuan Coleman	Jamesville-Dewitt	Syracuse	
2011 (tie)	Jabarie Hinds	Mount Vernon	West Virginia transferred to UMass	
2011 (tie)	Achraf Yacoubou	Long Island Lutheran	Villanova	
2010	Tobias Harris	Half Hollow Hills West	Tennessee	2011 NBA draft: 1st Rnd, 19th Overall by the Charlotte Bobcats traded to the Milwaukee Bucks
2009 (tie)	Brandon Triche	Jamesville-Dewitt	Syracuse	
2009 (tie)	Lance Stephenson	Abraham Lincoln	Cincinnati	2010 NBA draft: 2nd Rnd, 40th Overall by the Indiana Pacers
2008	Sylven Landesberg	Holy Cross	Virginia	
2007	Jonny Flynn	Niagara Falls	Syracuse	2009 NBA draft: 1st Rnd, 6th overall by the Minnesota Timberwolves
2006	Jonathan Mitchell	Mount Vernon	Florida transferred to Rutgers	
2005	Greg Paulus	Christian Brothers Academy (Syracuse)	Duke transferred to Syracuse to play football	
2004	Sebastian Telfair	Abraham Lincoln	No College	2004 NBA draft: 1st Rnd, 13th Overall by the Portland Trail Blazers
2003	Tyler Relph	McQuaid Jesuit (Rochester)	West Virginia transferred to St. Bonaventure	
2002	Jason Fraser	Amityville	Villanova	
2001	Julius Hodge	St. Raymond	North Carolina State	2005 NBA draft: 1st Rnd, 20th Overall by the Denver Nuggets
2000	Peter Mulligan	St. Raymond	Manhattan	
1999	Leonard Stokes	Turner Carroll (Buffalo)	Cincinnati	
1998	Anthony Glover	Rice	St. John's	
1997	Elton Brand	Peekskill	Duke	1999 NBA draft 1st Rnd, 1st overall pick by the Chicago Bulls
1996	Willie Dersch	Holy Cross	Virginia	
1995	Stephon Marbury	Abraham Lincoln	Georgia Tech	1996 NBA draft: 1st Rnd, 4th overall by the Milwaukee Bucks traded to Minnesota Timberwolves
1994	Felipe López	Rice	St. John's	1998 NBA draft: 1st Rnd, 20th overall by the San Antonio Spurs traded to Vancouver Grizzlies
1993	Danya Abrams	Hackley	Boston College	
1992	John Wallace	Greece Athena	Syracuse	1996 NBA draft 1st Rnd, 18th Overall by the New York Knicks
1991	Terrence Rencher	St. Raymond	Texas	1995 NBA draft 2nd Rnd, 32nd Overall by the Washington Bullets traded to Miami Heat
1990	Jamal Mashburn	Cardinal Hayes	Kentucky	1993 NBA draft: 1st Rnd, 4th overall by the Dallas Mavericks
1989	Kenny Anderson	Archbishop Molloy	Georgia Tech	1991 NBA draft: 1st Rnd, 2nd overall by the New Jersey Nets
1988	Malik Sealy	St. Nicholas of Tolentine	St. John's	1992 NBA draft 1st Rnd, 14th overall by the Indiana Pacers
1987 (tie)	Greg Koubek	Shenendehowa	Duke	
1987 (tie)	King Rice	Binghamton	North Carolina	
1986	Keith Robinson	Grover Cleveland	Notre Dame	

=== Awards by school ===
School	Number of Awards	Years
Abraham Lincoln	4	1995, 2004, 2009, 2014
St. Raymond	4	1991, 2000, 2001, 2017
Archbishop Stepinac High School	3	2020, 2024, 2026
Shenendehowa	2	1987, 2016
Holy Cross	2	1996, 2008
Long Island Lutheran	2	2011, 2025
Rice	2	1994, 1998
Mount Vernon	2	2006, 2011
Jamesville-Dewitt	2	2009, 2012
Christ the King	2	2013, 2023
Our Saviour Lutheran School	1	2022
Brentwood High School	1	2021
Glens Falls High School	1	2019
Half Hollow Hills East	1	2018
Iona Prep	1	2015
Half Hollow Hills West	1	2010
Niagara Falls	1	2007
Christian Brothers Academy (Syracuse)	1	2005
McQuaid Jesuit (Rochester)	1	2003
Amityville	1	2002
Turner Carroll (Buffalo)	1	1999
Peekskill	1	1997
Hackley	1	1993
Greece Athena	1	1992
Cardinal Hayes	1	1990
Archbishop Molloy	1	1989
St. Nicholas of Tolentine	1	1988
Binghamton	1	1987
Grover Cleveland	1	1986

=== Most winners by college ===
Number	Program	Years
6	Syracuse	1992, 2007, 2009, 2012, 2019, 2025
3	Duke	1987, 1997, 2005
3	St. John's	1988, 1994, 1998
2	Seton Hall	2014, 2022
2	West Virginia	2003, 2011
2	Villanova	2002, 2011
2	Cincinnati	1999, 2009
2	Virginia	1996, 2008
2	Georgia Tech	1989, 1995
2	North Carolina	1987, 2020
2	Notre Dame	1986, 2015

== See also ==
- Miss New York Basketball
