= Jahvon Quinerly =

American basketball player (born 1998)

No. 11 – Shanghai Blackbird
- Position: Point guard
- League: National Basketball League

Personal information
- Born: November 25, 1998 (age 27) Hackensack, New Jersey, U.S.
- Listed height: 6 ft 1 in (1.85 m)
- Listed weight: 175 lb (79 kg)

Career information
- High school: Hudson Catholic (Jersey City, New Jersey)
- College: Villanova (2018–2019); Alabama (2020–2023); Memphis (2023–2024)
- NBA draft: 2024: undrafted
- Playing career: 2025–present

Career history
- 2025–present: Shanghai Blackbird

Career highlights
- SEC tournament MVP (2021); McDonald's All-American (2018)

Jahvon Quinerly (born November 25, 1998) is an American professional basketball player for the Shanghai Blackbird of the National Basketball League (NBL). He played college basketball for the Memphis Tigers, Villanova Wildcats and Alabama Crimson Tide.

== High school career ==
Quinerly attended Hudson Catholic Regional High School in Jersey City, New Jersey, where he was a consensus five-star recruit. In his final two seasons, he earned back-to-back Gatorade New Jersey Boys Basketball Player of the Year honors. He was named to the West roster for the 2018 McDonald's All-American Boys Game, playing against high school teammate Louis King.

=== Recruiting ===
On August 8, 2017, Quinerly committed to play college basketball for Arizona, but he reopened his recruitment in October after federal documents suggested that he had taken a $15,000 bribe from the team's assistant coach Emanuel Richardson, who had been arrested during the 2017–18 NCAA basketball corruption scandal. On February 14, 2018, despite strong recruitment efforts from Oklahoma, he committed to Villanova.

College recruiting
Name	Hometown	School	Height	Weight	Commit date
Jahvon Quinerly; PG	Hackensack, NJ	Hudson Catholic (NJ)	6 ft 1 in (1.85 m)	160 lb (73 kg)	Feb 14, 2018
Jahvon Quinerly; PG	Recruit ratings: Rivals: 247Sports: ESPN: (90)				
Overall recruit ranking: Rivals: 31 247Sports: 28 ESPN: 26
Note: In many cases, Scout, Rivals, 247Sports, On3, and ESPN may conflict in their listings of height and weight.; In these cases, the average was taken. ESPN grades are on a 100-point scale.; Sources: "Villanova 2018 Basketball Commitments". Rivals.; "2018 Villanova Wildcats Recruiting Class". ESPN.; "2018 Team Ranking". Rivals.

== College career ==
=== Villanova ===
Entering Quinerly's freshman season, Villanova lost several key players to the NBA draft after winning the 2018 NCAA tournament. Quinerly was the program's top recruit in the 2018 class and was expected to replace Jalen Brunson, the reigning national player of the year. In his debut on November 6, 2018, Quinerly recorded three points and three assists, shooting 1-of-4 from the field, in 17 minutes versus Morgan State. On December 12, after receiving under 10 minutes of playing time in addition to not playing for six straight games, he posted an Instagram story that read Villanova was his "2nd choice for a reason." Quinerly soon deleted the post before posting random pictures and soon deleting his account. The incident drew speculation that he was attempting to pretend that his account had been hacked. On December 13, he apologized for his controversial post. Through 25 games, Quinerly averaged 3.2 points in 9.1 minutes per game. On April 3, 2019, he announced that he would transfer from Villanova.

=== Alabama ===
On June 2, 2019, Quinerly committed to Alabama after also considering Pittsburgh. He sat out for his next year due to transfer rules. In his debut on November 25, 2020, Quinerly posted 18 points, one rebound and three assists in an 81–57 win against Jacksonville State. He was named SEC tournament MVP after leading Alabama to the title. On March 22, 2021, Quinerly recorded 14 points, 11 assists and five rebounds in a 96–77 win over Maryland in the second round of the NCAA tournament. He suffered a knee injury in an NCAA tournament loss to Notre Dame as a junior. Quinerly averaged 14.3 points, 4.3 assists and 3.1 rebounds per game. On June 25, 2023, Quinerly announced he would enter the transfer portal and, as a graduate transfer, would be eligible to play for a new team immediately.

=== Memphis ===
On July 13, 2023, Quinerly committed to Memphis and Coach Penny Hardaway.

== Career statistics ==
Legend
GP	Games played	GS	Games started	MPG	Minutes per game
FG%	Field goal percentage	3P%	3-point field goal percentage	FT%	Free throw percentage
RPG	Rebounds per game	APG	Assists per game	SPG	Steals per game
BPG	Blocks per game	PPG	Points per game	**Bold**	Career high

=== College ===
Year	Team	GP	GS	MPG	FG%	3P%	FT%	RPG	APG	SPG	BPG	PPG
2018–19	Villanova	25	0	9.1	.337	.250	.733	.8	.9	.2	.0	3.2
2019–20	Alabama	Redshirt										
2020–21	Alabama	30	7	25.0	**.478**	**.433**	.689	2.2	3.2	.6	.0	12.9
2021–22	Alabama	33	27	**30.0**	.411	.281	.740	**3.0**	**4.2**	.6	**.2**	**13.8**
2022–23	Alabama	**35**	6	21.1	.402	.357	**.820**	1.9	3.6	.7	.0	8.7
2023–24	Memphis	32	**31**	32.9	.405	.345	.792	3.3	4.9	**1.3**	.1	13.5
Career		155	71	24.3	.418	.339	.758	2.3	3.5	.7	.1	10.7

== Personal life ==
Quinerly is a member of the basketball collective "Jelly Fam" centered around flashy finger roll layups, which he helped create with prominent high school player Isaiah Washington. His younger brother, Jaden, was a walk-on basketball player at Alabama.
