= Cilano =

Cilano may refer to:

- Cosmo A. Cilano, American politician
- Cara Cilano, American professor and author
