= James McCourt (writer) =

American writer (born 1941)

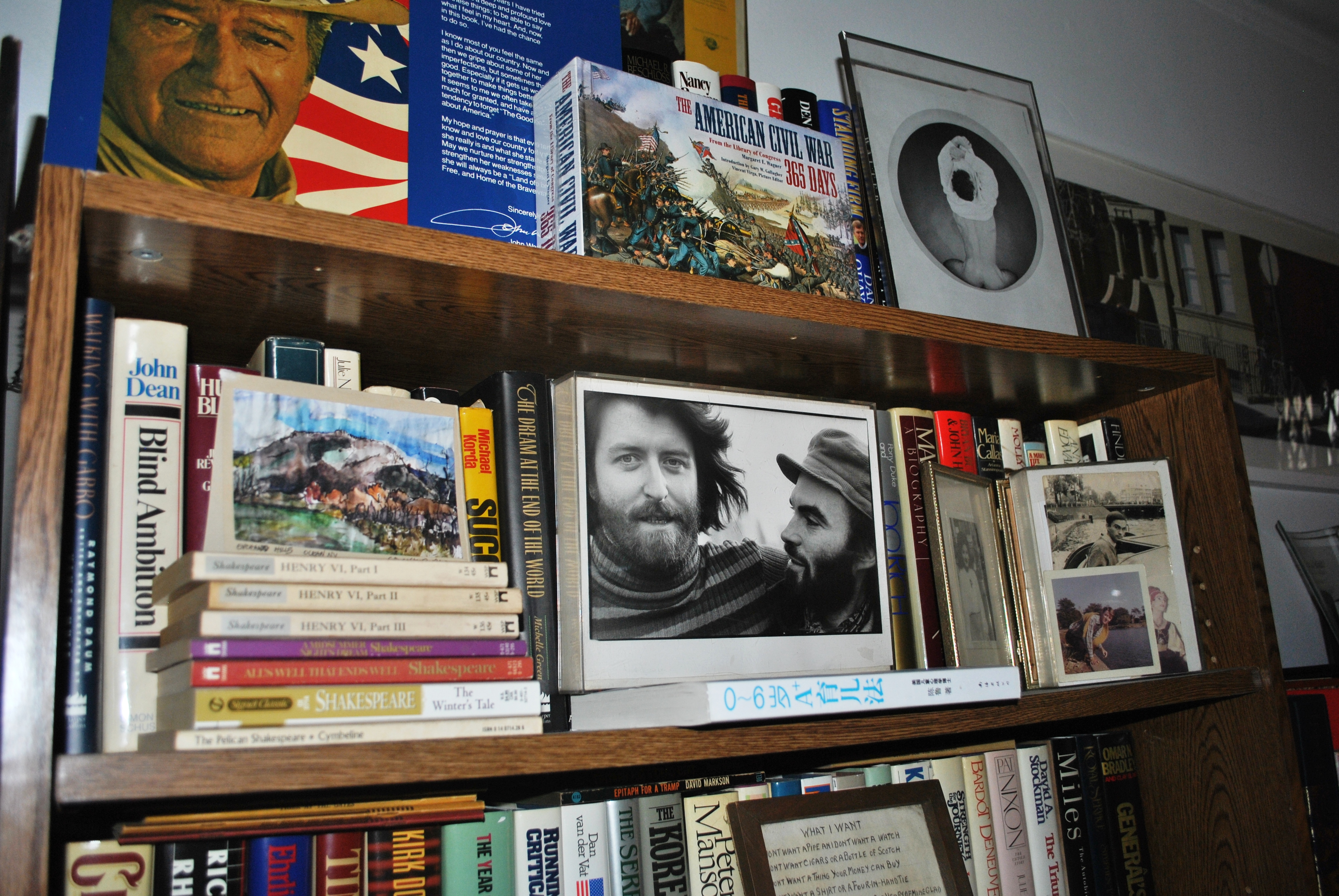
- "The central photo was taken by Laura Rubin a long time ago, and the ones on the far right were taken even longer ago: Jimmy McCourt in Central Park the summer before we met at Yale in '64 and me getting on a boat in Amsterdam in '65." Vincent Virga
- Born: July 4, 1941 (age 85)
- Education: Yale School of Drama
- Occupations: Writer; novelist
- Partner: Vincent Virga

James McCourt (born July 4, 1941) is an American writer, known for his "extended fictions" featuring an overlapping, recurring cast of often camp and bizarre characters. His notable works include his debut fiction Mawrdew Czgowchwz (1975), Kaye Wayfaring in "Avenged": Four Stories (1984) and nonfiction Queer Street (2003).

== Work ==
McCourt was raised in Jackson Heights, Queens. McCourt has been with his life partner, novelist Vincent Virga, since 1964 after they met at Yale University as graduate students in the Yale School of Drama.

McCourt is best known for his extravagant debut Mawrdew Czgowchwz (1975), about a fictional opera diva. Regarding his first book, he once told the New York Times Book Review: "Nowhere on the book does it say it's a novel. In a novel, something is wrapped up, it finishes. But my stories just stop. Sure, Mawrdew Czgowchwz is an extended fiction, but it never wraps up." McCourt went on: "A novel is something I don't get around to doing or don't want to do. I'm writing about this extended tribe of people, instead of writing about a family as J.D. Salinger does." His Now Voyagers (2007) is the first in a series of projected sequels to Mawrdew Czgowchwz.

McCourt has garnered praise from critics Susan Sontag and Harold Bloom and has been championed by author Dennis Cooper. Sontag directed McCourt's Mawrdew Czgowchwz to her publisher's attention, while Bloom named a later work, Time Remaining, to his influential Western Canon.

McCourt's and Virga's papers are held at Yale's Beinecke Rare Book & Manuscript Library.

== Bibliography ==
Fiction

- Mawrdew Czgowchwz (Farrar, Straus & Giroux, 1975)
- Kaye Wayfaring in "Avenged" (stories) (Viking, 1984)
- Time Remaining (stories) (Knopf, 1993)
- Delancey's Way (Knopf, 2000)
- Wayfaring at Waverly in Silverlake (stories) (Knopf, 2002)
- Now Voyagers, Book One: The Night Sea Journey (Turtle Point Press, 2007)

Nonfiction

- Queer Street: Rise and Fall of an American Culture, 1947–1985 (W. W. Norton, 2003)
- Lasting City: The Anatomy of Nostalgia (Liveright Publishing Corporation, 2013)

Shorter writings

- "Jameson, Wake." Boss no. 5 (1979): 56–63.
- "Strange Attraction: Exaltation and Calculation in the Poetry of James Schuyler." Review of Contemporary Fiction 8.3 (Fall 1988): 131–37.
- "Summer Buses, Summer Fugues." In Summer, ed. Alice Gordon and Vincent Virga. Reading, MA: Addison-Wesley Publishing Company, 1990, pp. 229–38. [short fiction set in California in the 1950s]
- “Come Back, Harry Fannin!” Review of Contemporary Fiction 10.2 (Summer 1990): 184–86. [on David Markson's early novels]
- "Duet with a Diva: Opera Rhapsodist James McCourt Talks with Legendary Victoria de los Ángeles, Who Is Celebrating Her 50th Year Onstage." Los Angeles Times, 6 November 1994.
- “Introduction.” Severo Sarduy, “Cobra” and “Maitreya.” Normal: Dalkey Archive Press, 1995, pp. xi-xviii.
- “Not Some Brainless Beauty” [book review of Faye Dunaway's Looking for Gatsby]. New York Times Book Review, 10 December 1995, p. 39.
- “Prima Donna” [book review of Kim Chernin's Cecilia Bartoli]. New York Times Book Review, 16 March 1997, p. 16.
- "Gass's Hamlet." In Into "The Tunnel": Readings of Gass's Novel. Edited by Steven G. Kellman and Irving Malin. Newark: University of Delaware Press, 1998, 21–29.
- "Mae West." Yale Review 87.3 (July 1999): 45–55.
- “The Actors Who Reflect the Stars.” New York Times, 23 March 2003, sec. 4, p. 13. [On best-supporting actor award]
- "Riding Shotgun with the Almighty." Los Angeles Times Book Review, 2 October 2005. [book review of Dennis Cooper's God Jr.]
- "Afterword." In James Schuyler. What's for Dinner? NY: New York Review Books, 2006, pp. 199–211.
- "Observations and Riffs on Forcing Nature." In George Haas, Forcing Nature: Trees in Los Angeles. Piedmont, NH: Bunker Hill Publishing, 2006, pp. 7–9.
- "Fiction in Review." Yale Review 94.3 (July 2006): 155–68. [on Truman Capote]
- "Theater in Review." Yale Review 95.4 (October 2007): 175–84. [on Hedda Gabler]
- "The Canticle of Skoozle." Triple Canopy no. 14 (13 September 2011).
- [On semicolons]. Apology no. 1 (Winter 2013): 133–35.
- “Vissi d’Arte (The Memoirs of Morgana Neri, As Confided to ‘Oroviso’).” Pleasure: A Journal of the Arts, September 2015, pp. 37-58.
