= Layup =

Type of shot in basketball

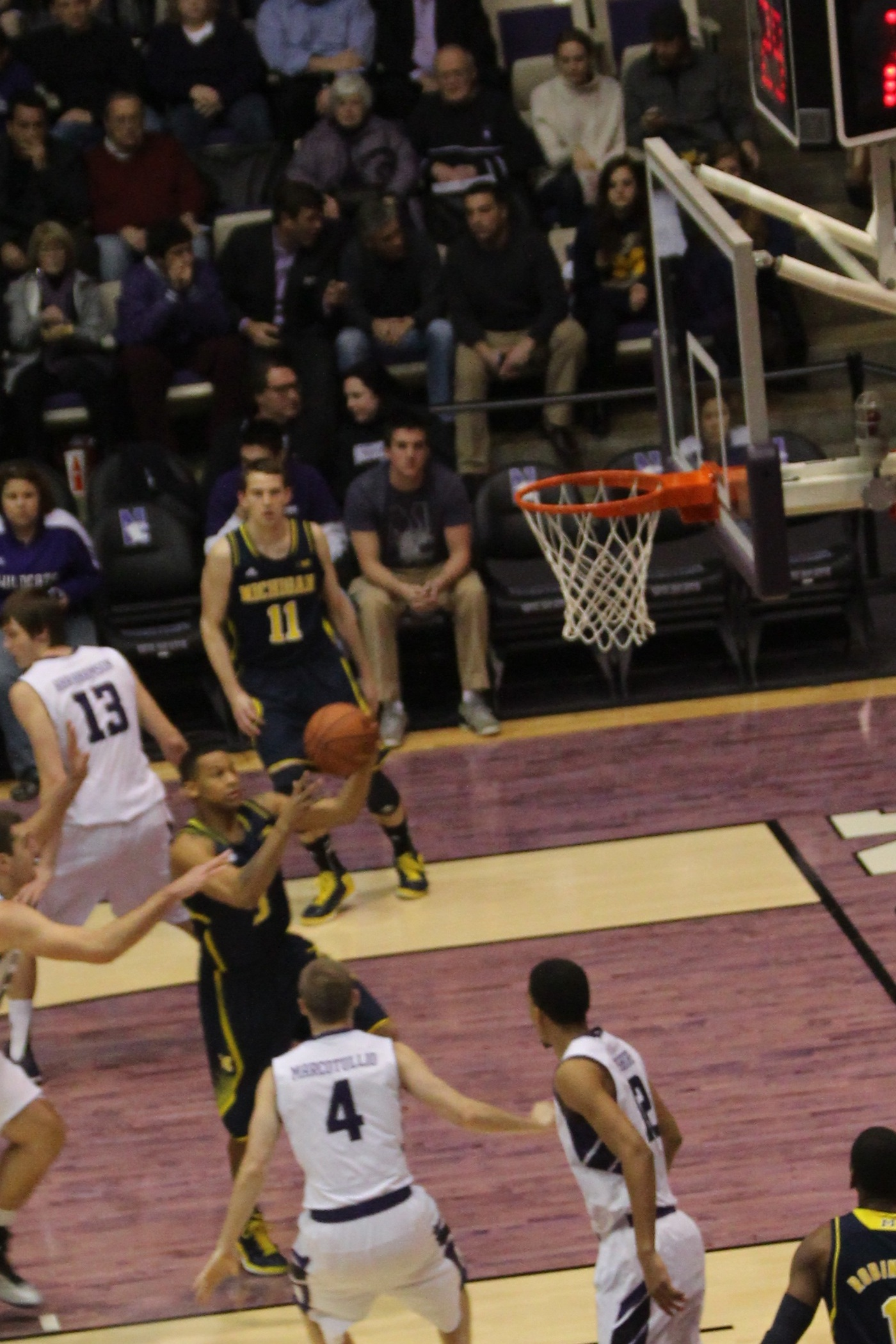
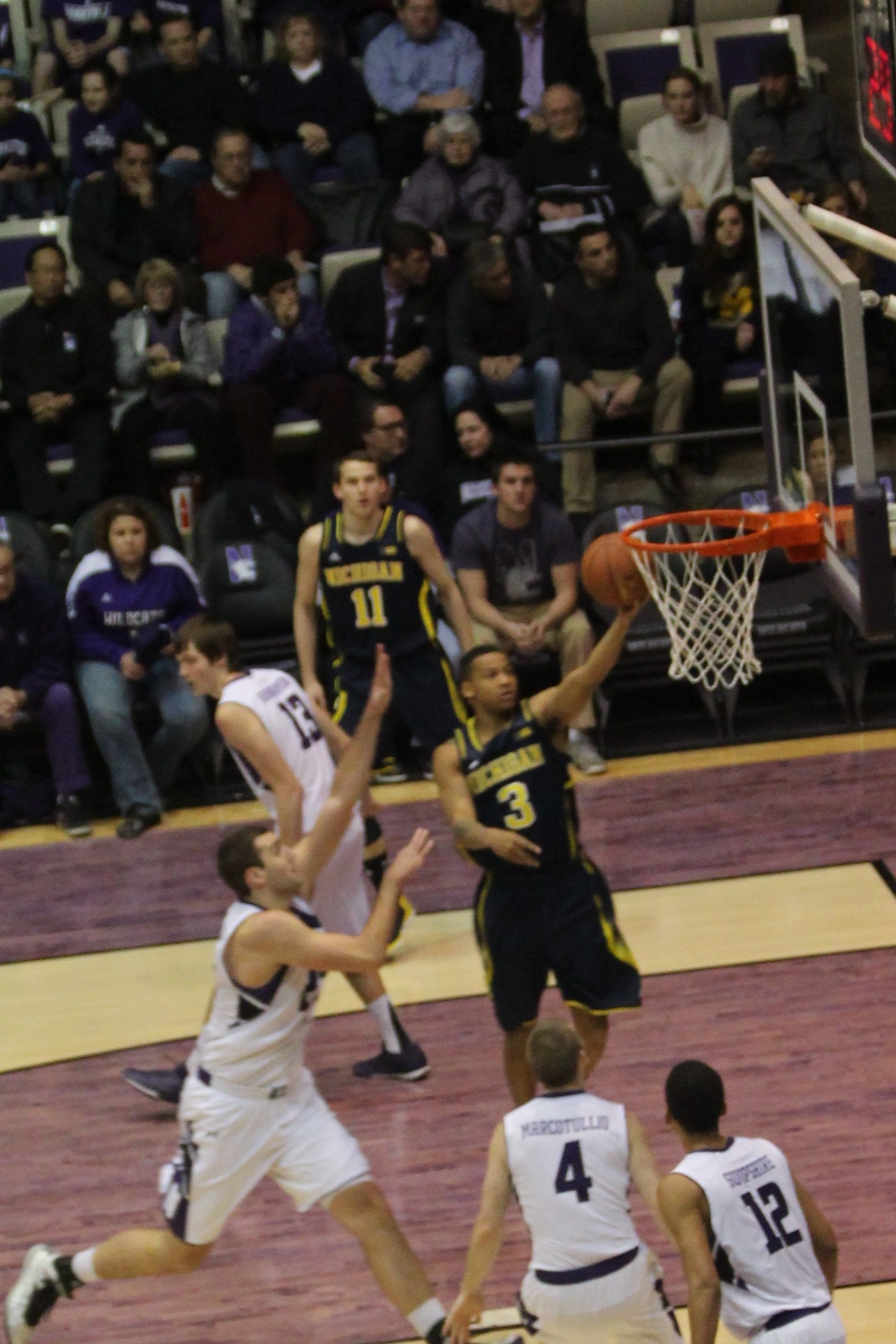
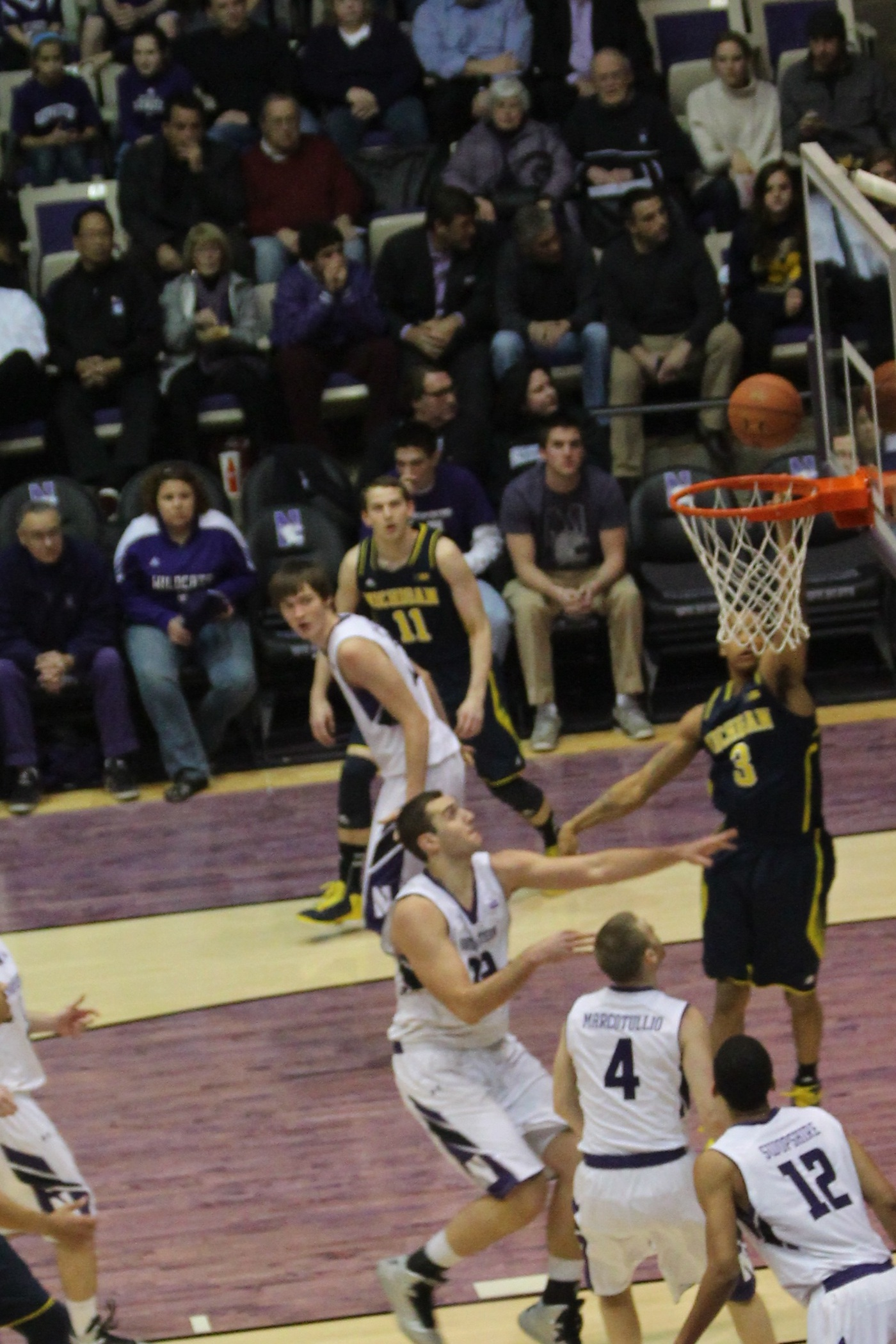
A layup by Trey Burke for the Michigan Wolverines in the 2012–13 Big Ten Conference men's basketball season opener on January 3 against Northwestern

A layup or lay in basketball is a two-point shot attempt made by leaping from below, "laying" the ball up near the basket, and using one hand to bounce it off the backboard and into the basket. The motion and one-handed reach distinguish it from a jump shot. The layup is considered the most basic shot in basketball. When doing a layup, the player lifts the outside foot, or the foot away from the basket.

An undefended layup is usually a high percentage shot. The main obstacle is getting near the rim and avoiding blocks by taller defenders who usually stand near the basket. Common layup strategies are to create spaces, release the ball from a different spot, or use alternate hands. A player able to reach over the rim might choose to perform a more spectacular and higher percentage slam dunk (dropping or throwing the ball from above the rim) instead.

== Versions ==
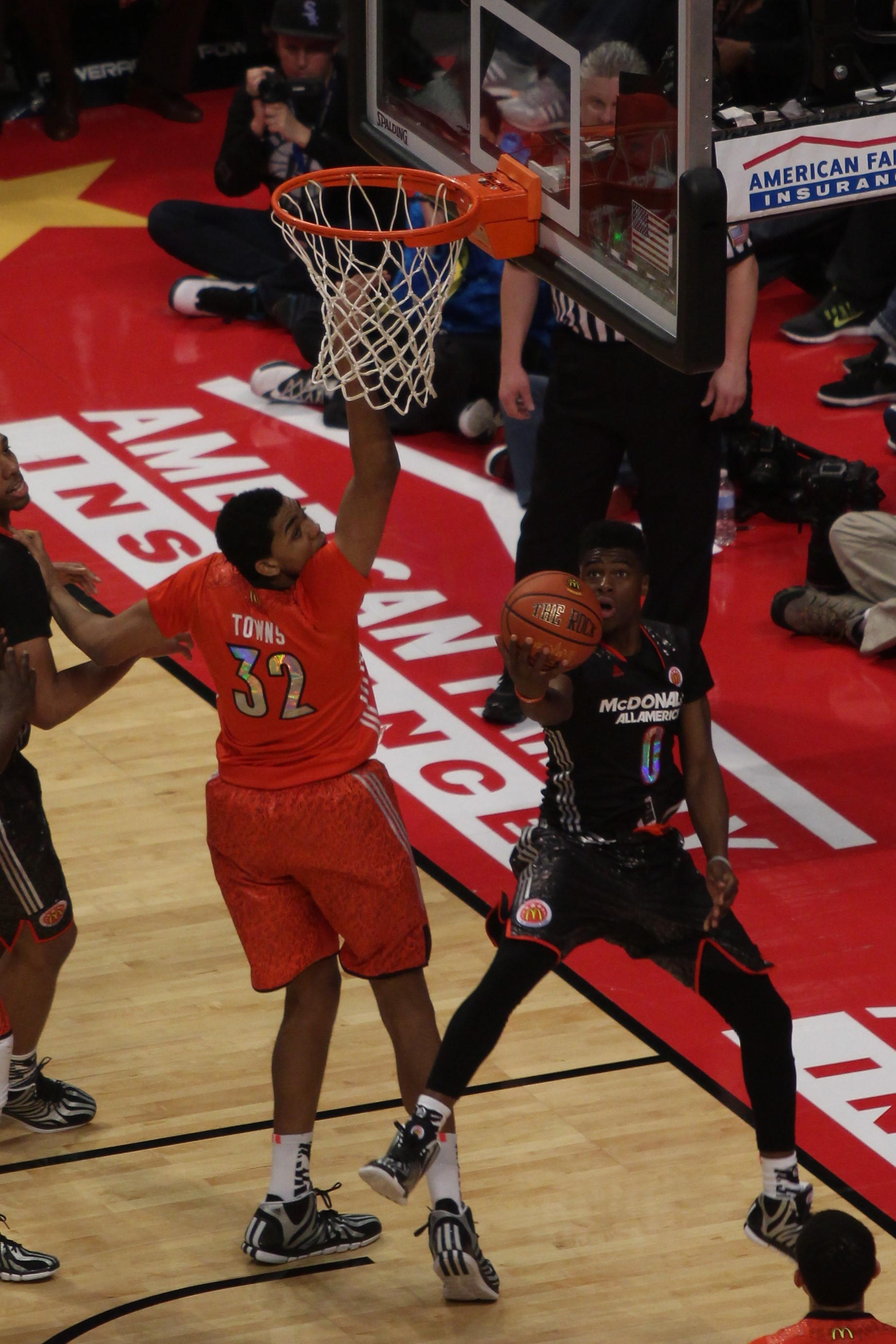
Emmanuel Mudiay does a reverse layup in the 2014 McDonald's All-American Boys Game

As the game has evolved through the years, so has the layup. Several different versions of the layup are around today. Layups can be broadly categorized into two types: the underarm and the overarm. The underarm layup involves using most of the wrist and the fingers to 'lay' the ball into the net or off the board. This layup is more commonly known as the finger roll. Wilt Chamberlain was one of the early practitioners of a showy finger-roll layup. Notable past NBA players who rely heavily on the underarm finger roll are Mike Bibby and Allen Iverson.

Finger rolls today have many forms, including the "Around the World" which involves a complete circle around the player before the layup and a variety of faking in the approach to the rim. A classic example is a play by Jason Williams during his time with Sacramento, in which Williams brought the ball behind his back with his right hand, in a fake of a back pass, and then brought it front again with the same hand for the finish (reminiscent of Bob Cousy, who pioneered the move).

The other layup is the overhand shot, similar to a jump shot but from a considerably close range. Overhand layups nearly always involve the action of the backboard. Players like Scottie Pippen and Karl Malone have used this move to great effect.

The Reverse Layup is a type of layup often used to evade a block. It is distinguished by the fact that the ball is tossed backwards, with the shooter facing away from the basket. It is often employed during a baseline drive, where the attacking player starts on one side of the basket and finishes on the other, or when a defender commits to defending one side of the rim to cut off a conventional layup. Occasionally a player will stay on the same side of the rim, back to the basket, and shoot a reverse layup; this tactic was sometimes used by Michael Jordan in order to score with his back to the basket against taller defenders.

It is common for players to create room for a layup by making use of the allotted two steps before the layup attempt. Variations and improvisations exist, yet the most common form is the Euro-Step. So-called as it was introduced to the NBA by European players, it has been adopted mainly by guards and forwards as it relies heavily on agility and footwork to avoid larger defenders, although bigger players such as Joel Embiid have been seen making use of the move. The Euro-Step itself involves picking up one's dribble while dribbling, taking one step in one direction, then quickly taking a step in the other direction to avoid the defender to create room for a layup attempt. To make use of the move efficiently, it is best to dribble in aggressively then take two broad steps in different directions while simultaneously bringing the ball over one's head in the direction one is stepping for maximum evasion and protection while potentially drawing a foul.

== Gallery ==
Sam Van Rossom layups in a Valencia Basket match.

== See also ==
- NBA records
