= Reilly Center =

Multi-purpose arena in St. Bonaventure, New York

- The RC
- Interactive map of Reilly Center
- Former names: University Center (1966-1974)
- Location: St. Bonaventure, New York
- Coordinates: 42.079428°N 78.484998°W
- Owner: St. Bonaventure University
- Operator: St. Bonaventure University
- Capacity: 5,480
- Surface: Hardwood

Construction
- Opened: 1966

Tenant
- St. Bonaventure Bonnies (NCAA Sports)

Reilly Center, previously known as University Center, is a 5,480-seat multi-purpose arena, in St. Bonaventure, New York, near Olean, New York. It is home to the St. Bonaventure University Bonnies men's and women's basketball teams. The arena opened in 1966 and is named for Mike Reilly, who coached both varsity football and basketball at the university.

In 2007, the playing surface was named "Bob Lanier Court" in honor of former Bonnies and NBA great Bob Lanier, who led the Bonnies to the Final Four in 1970.

It is the third-largest basketball arena in Western New York (behind the over 18,000 seats in KeyBank Center and the 6,100 seats in Broadview Arena at the University at Buffalo North Campus) and has the highest seating capacity of any sports venue in Cattaraugus County and the western Southern Tier.

In 2001, the facility was named one of the five toughest places to play in college basketball by ESPN's Jay Bilas.

== See also ==
- List of NCAA Division I basketball arenas
