= Julius Hodge =

American and Antiguan basketball player (born 1983)

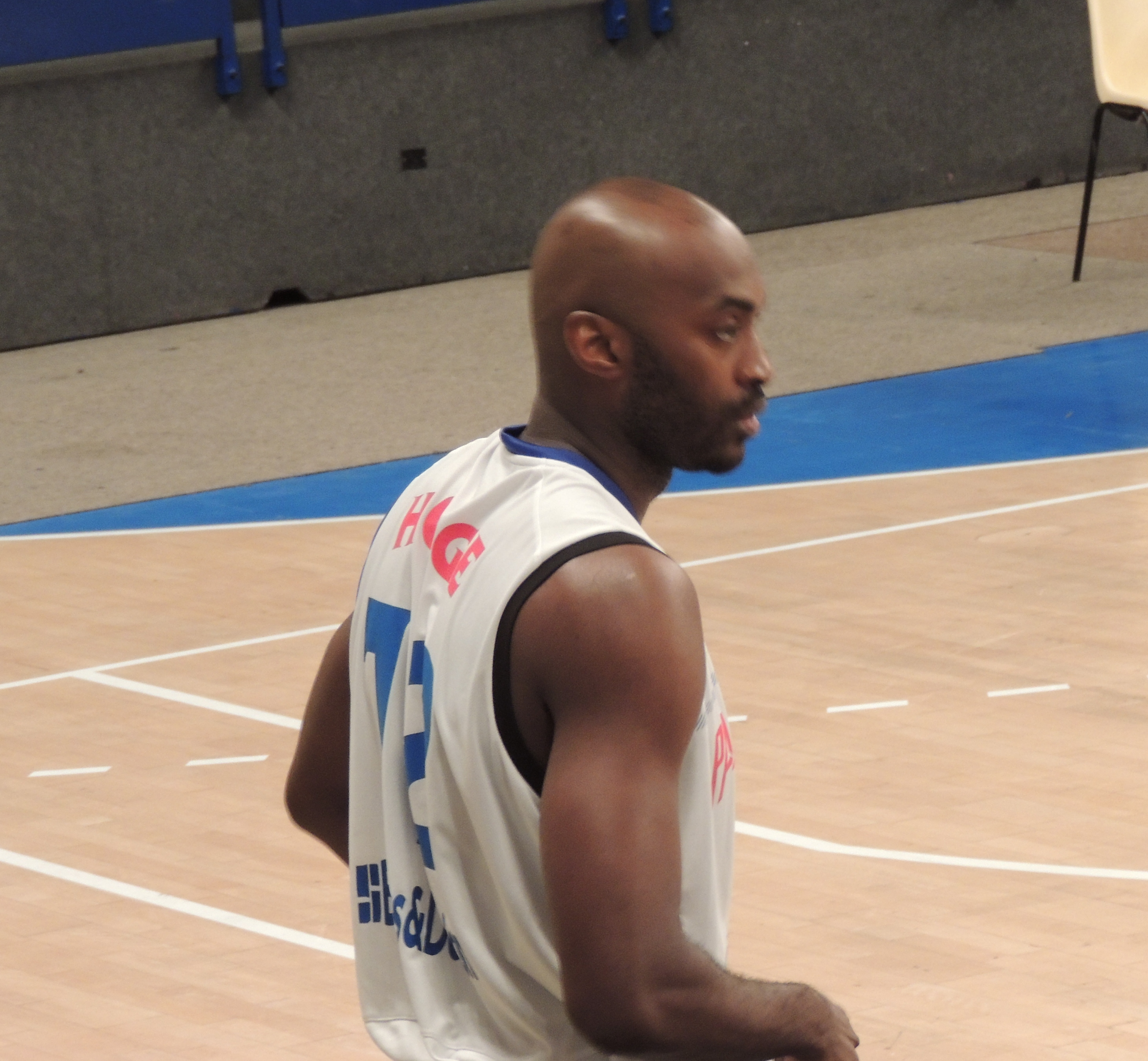
- Hodge with Paris-Levallois in 2012

Lincoln Lions
- Title: Head coach
- League: Central Intercollegiate Athletic Association

Personal information
- Born: November 18, 1983 (age 43) Harlem, New York, U.S.
- Listed height: 6 ft 7 in (2.01 m)
- Listed weight: 210 lb (95 kg)

Career information
- High school: St. Raymond (Bronx, New York)
- College: NC State (2001–2005)
- NBA draft: 2005: 1st round, 20th overall pick
- Drafted by: Denver Nuggets
- Playing career: 2005–2015
- Position: Small forward / shooting guard
- Number: 32, 24
- Coaching career: 2015–present

Career history

Playing
- 2005–2007: Denver Nuggets
- 2006: →Austin Toros
- 2006–2007: →Colorado 14ers
- 2007: Milwaukee Bucks
- 2007: Albuquerque Thunderbirds
- 2007: Cimberio Varese
- 2007: Legea Scafati
- 2007–2009: Adelaide 36ers
- 2009–2010: Melbourne Tigers
- 2010: Trotamundos de Carabobo
- 2010: Guangzhou Free Man
- 2010–2011: Petrochimi Bandar Imam
- 2011: BK Minsk-2006
- 2011: Jiangsu Tongxi
- 2011–2012: Saigon Heat
- 2012: Caciques de Humacao
- 2012: Marinos de Anzoátegui
- 2012: Vaqueros de Bayamón
- 2012–2013: Paris-Levallois
- 2013: Saint John Mill Rats
- 2014: Champville SC
- 2014: Cheshire Phoenix

Coaching
- 2015–2016: Buffalo (dir. player personnel)
- 2016–2018: Santa Clara (assistant)
- 2018–2021: San Jose State (assistant)
- 2021–2024: Little Rock (assistant)
- 2024–present: Lincoln (PA)

Career highlights
- 2× All-NBL Third Team (2008, 2010); Consensus second-team All-American (2004); ACC Player of the Year (2004); 2× First-team All-ACC (2003, 2004); No. 24 jersey honored by NC State Wolfpack; McDonald's All-American (2001); Second-team Parade All-American (2001); Mr. New York Basketball (2001)
- Stats at NBA.com
- Stats at Basketball Reference

Julius Melvin Hodge (born November 18, 1983) is an American and Antiguan basketball coach and former professional player who is the head coach for the Lincoln Lions men's basketball team. Originally from Harlem, New York, Hodge played college basketball for the NC State Wolfpack and was selected 20th overall in the 2005 NBA draft by the Denver Nuggets. The ACC Player of the Year during the 2003–04 season, Hodge finished his college career by leading State to the Sweet 16.

== Early life ==
Julius Hodge was born in the Manhattan neighborhood of Harlem and raised across the Harlem River from Yankee Stadium. His mother, Mary Hodge, worked two jobs, including as a teacher's aide, to support Julius and his two siblings.

Hodge became smitten with basketball when he was five years old after his father took him to a New York Knicks game against the Los Angeles Lakers at Madison Square Garden where Magic Johnson smiled at him in the crowd. Hodge's father was deported to Antigua and Barbuda when Hodge was nine years old and Hodge has not seen him since. Hodge's older brother, Steven, was his strongest male role model and played basketball in the NJCAA at Sullivan County Community College and later in NCAA Division II at Long Island University – Southampton. Steven made the decision to name his younger brother after all-time basketball great Julius Erving.

== High school career ==
As a senior at St. Raymond High School for Boys, operated by the De La Salle Christian Brothers, in the Bronx, New York, Hodge was part of the 2001 McDonald's All-American Team and the First-team Parade All-American, New York State Mr. Basketball, New York Daily News Player of the Year, New York All-Metro Squad, and Sports Illustrated's Old Spice Athlete of the Month. He scored a total of 684 points his senior season, setting the school record at St. Raymond High School, and left rated as the best shooting guard by ESPN and fifth-best nationally. He averaged 24.5 points, 5 assists and 4 steals per game. Hodge surprised basketball fans by choosing to attend North Carolina State University over Syracuse University.

== College career ==
As a freshman with the NC State Wolfpack, he was the leading freshman scorer in the ACC, averaging 10.7 points per game. He was named to second-team All-ACC Tournament team, after averaging 12.3 points. He earned the Lorenzo Charles Offensive Rebounding Award for 2002, Dick Vitale's "Diaper Dandy" and ranked 20th in the ACC in rebounding. He scored a double-double in his first collegiate game and his first ACC game. He was the only Pack player with multiple double-doubles for the 2001–2002 season.

For the 2002–03 campaign, Hodge was selected as a First Team All-ACC player. He recorded four career-highs during the three-day run to the finals of the ACC tournament. He recorded his seventh double-double during the final game of the tournament and ranked seventh in free throw percentage for the season. During this season he recorded the first-ever triple-double in Wolfpack history, and was named ACC Player of the Week after leading the Pack to back-to-back victories against Duke and North Carolina. He was one of 17 finalists to make the U.S. squad for the 2003 Pan American Games and Dick Vitale named Hodge to his "All-Rolls Royce Team." He was one of the 50 preseason candidates for the Wooden Award.

During the 2005 NCAA tournament, Hodge hit a game winning shot against UConn after Charlie Villanueva had tied the score.

After concluding his senior season and entering the NBA draft, Hodge remained at NC State to finish his degree in communications.

== Professional career ==
=== NBA ===
Hodge was chosen in the first round (20th overall) of the 2005 NBA Draft by the Denver Nuggets. He appeared in 14 games for the Nuggets in the 2005–06 season while averaging only 0.9 points in 2.4 minutes.

On January 5, 2007, Hodge started in his first career NBA game, against the Los Angeles Lakers. Six days later he was traded to the Milwaukee Bucks along with Earl Boykins for Steve Blake. On February 7 of that year, Hodge was waived by the Bucks. Later that year, he played for the 2007 Seattle SuperSonics summer league team.

=== Italy ===
On August 10, 2007, Hodge signed with Italian Serie A team Cimberio Varese. Midway through the season, he transferred to fellow Serie A team Legea Scafati. In Italy, Hodge had trouble getting his clubs to fulfill his salary obligations.

=== Adelaide 36ers ===
==== 2007–08 season ====
On December 21, 2007, Hodge signed with the Adelaide 36ers in the Australian NBL as their second import to replace the outgoing Mike Chappell. He finished his contract with Italian Serie A team Legea Scafati and arrived in Adelaide on December 23 after making trips to his hometown New York. He made his debut for the 36ers against the South Dragons helping them to a victory. On January 29, Hodge was rewarded with the league's player of the week for round 19 after averaging 27 points, 4 rebounds and 4.5 assists in the two games the 36ers played, which included a dominant performance of 39 points, 10 rebounds and 5 assists against the Cairns Taipans. On February 2, Hodge became the first 36er since Robert Rose in 1994 to record a triple double (24 points, 12 rebounds, 13 assists). A few days after, on February 5, Hodge won his second and back-to-back player of the week for Round 20 after averaging 31 points, 10.5 rebounds and 9.5 assists, which also included a performance of 37 points, 9 rebounds, and 6 assists in the 36ers lost to the Gold Coast Blaze. On February 12, Hodge won his third consecutive player of the week for round 21 by having another dominant performance of 31 points, 14 rebounds and 9 assists in the 36ers win against the Cairns Taipans. Hodge became just the second player to win the award three times (Chris Anstey is the other player to do so), and the first player to win it three times consecutively during the season. Despite only playing half of the season in the league, Hodge was rewarded with the All NBL Third Team for his efforts with the 36ers. Hodge then bid for his return to the NBA by trying out with the New Jersey Nets, but could not make the regular season roster despite signing a 2-year non-guaranteed contract.

==== 2008–09 season ====
On November 15, 2008, Hodge re-signed with the Adelaide 36ers replacing outgoing import Mark Tyndale. In the first week of his return to the NBL, Hodge won another NBL Player of the Week award for round 10, averaging 26.5 points per game, 10.5 rebounds, 6 assists, and 1 steal, despite the 36ers losing the two games he played in. This included a dominant performance of 27 points, 8 rebounds, and 8 assists against the South Dragons, and the praise of opposition coach Brian Goorjian, who coached the Australian Boomers in the 2008 Beijing Olympics, saying that he was "possibly the best player in the league." On December 30, 2008, Hodge won his second NBL Player of the Week award of the season for round 15, after having scored 31 points (while shooting 13 of 19 from the field at a 68% clip) and pulling 8 rebounds to lead the 36ers in a crucial road victory over the Melbourne Tigers.

In 2011, it was revealed Hodge's recruitment had been paid for out of the $27 million Christopher Wayne Fuss had embezzled from Flinders University. On July 8, 2011, Fuss received nine years jail for the theft.

=== Melbourne Tigers ===
In the summer of 2009, Hodge attended a Chicago Bulls mini-camp but did not make the team's roster. In November 2009, Hodge signed with the Melbourne Tigers to help bolster an injury-plagued roster missing Chris Anstey. In his November 14, 2009 debut, Hodge scored 22 points and tallied 9 rebounds and 7 assists, but it wasn't enough as the Townsville Crocodiles won 98–91.

Hodge returned to Adelaide as a member of the Melbourne Tigers in December 2009. He was booed every time he touched the ball and after the win Hodge stamped on Brett Maher's signature on center court. He had to receive a police escort off the court and out of the building.

=== Trotamundos de Carabobo ===
Hodge returned to the Americas in 2010 after signing a contract with Trotamundos de Carabobo of Venezuela's Liga Profesional de Baloncesto.

=== Guangzhou Free Man ===
After a brief stint in Venezuela, Hodge was signed in the summer of 2010 by Guangzhou Free Man of China's National Basketball League. He scored 16 points in his debut against Shenyang.

=== Petrochimi Bandar Imam ===
Later in 2010, Hodge received a substantial offer from Petrochimi Bandar Imam BC of the Iranian Basketball Super League. Although impressed by the quality of basketball in Iran, Hodge was not comfortable with the environment. On March 3, 2011, Hodge and the club agreed to terminate his contract because they were unable to pay him the full amount.

=== Tsmoki-Minsk ===
Hodge's first new team of 2011 was BC Tsmoki-Minsk, a Belarusian Premier League team in Minsk. Due to a struggling economy, the club was slow to make payments and Hodge ultimately exercised an option to exit his contract early.

=== Jiangsu Tongxi ===
Hodge returned to China in 2011, this time playing for the Jiangsu Tongxi. In seven games with Jiangsu, he averaged 25.6 points per game and was named the All-Chinese NBL Import Player of the Year.

=== Saigon Heat ===
In December 2011, Hodge signed with Vietnam's Saigon Heat of the ASEAN Basketball League. On February 20, 2012, the Heat released him. Hodge described playing in Vietnam as an "adventure" where he had the unique experience of playing alongside teammates who worked 9–5 jobs.

=== Paris-Levallois ===
In November 2012, Hodge was added to the roster of Paris-Levallois Basket in France's LNB Pro A. In Paris, he was teammates with Sean May and Jawad Williams, both of whom were Hodge's conference rivals in college and his teenage friends from the youth basketball circuit.

=== Saint John Mill Rats ===
The Saint John Mill Rats of the National Basketball League of Canada announced the signing of Hodge on February 4, 2013. Hodge became just the ninth former NBA player to ever play in the league. The club bought out his contract with Paris-Levallois Basket later that month on February 25.

== National team ==
In 2011, Hodge played for the Antigua and Barbuda national basketball team in the Caribbean Basketball Confederation Championship.

== Post-playing career ==
On May 18, 2015, Buffalo Bulls head coach Nate Oats announced that Hodge would serve as the Director of Player Development for the State University of New York at Buffalo.

On March 29, 2016, Hodge joined his former college coach Herb Sendek as an assistant coach at Santa Clara University.

On April 26, 2018, Hodge joined the staff of Jean Prioleau at San Jose State as an assistant coach.

In July 2021, Hodge became an assistant coach at Little Rock.

== Personal life ==
After visiting a nightclub on April 8, 2006, Hodge was on Interstate 76 in North Denver around 2:00 a.m. when another vehicle pulled alongside his and fired several shots. Hodge was told he came within 5 minutes of bleeding to death. The case has yet to be solved.

During each offseason of his overseas playing career, Hodge returned to live in Raleigh, North Carolina where he played during his college career. As of 2013, Hodge is married with two children. He describes himself as a "movie buff."
