= John Luddy Burke =

United States Navy officer, business executive and American football player

- Born: August 22, 1909; Waterbury, Connecticut, U.S.
- Died: September 5, 2003 (aged 94); Waterbury, Connecticut, U.S.
- Education: Manhattan College
- Occupations: Business executive Naval officer
- Spouse: Ann Gertrude Rock (m. 1943; died 1990)
- Relatives: Morgan J. Burke Jr. (brother)
- Military career
- Branch: United States Navy
- Years: 1943–1945
- Rank: Lieutenant commander
- Battles: World War II; Battle of Saipan; Battle of Hollandia; Battle of Leyte; Invasion of Lingayen Gulf

John Luddy Burke (August 22, 1909 – September 5, 2003) was a United States Navy officer and business executive. He played semi-professional American football for several years.

John Luddy Burke was born on August 22, 1909, in Waterbury, Connecticut. His eldest brother was Morgan J. Burke Jr., a New York judge and attorney.

Burke attended Manhattan College in New York City, during which time he was considered an "excellent football player". The lettermen of Manhattan College elected him captain of the college team in a unanimous vote in 1930. He played semi-professional football for many teams in the Waterbury area. The New York Times considered him a "splendid tackler and receiver of passes".

Burke joined the United States Navy following the Attack on Pearl Harbor. He served in the Asiatic-Pacific Theater between 1943 and 1945 on the Fletcher-class destroyer USS Conner. Gaining the rank of Lieutenant Commander, he took part in the Philippines campaign (1944–1945) and the battles of Saipan, Hollandia, Leyte, and Lingayen Gulf. He led several boat parties from the USS Conner with Japanese prisoners from the Pacific.

In 1946, Burke ran unsuccessfully as a candidate for the Connecticut House of Representatives representing Waterbury.

Burke then entered the Outdoor Advertising Industry. He rose to become president of Big D Outdoor Advertising and, in 1960, was elected executive vice president of Packer Outdoor Advertising and vice president of the Harry H. Packer Company and the Outdoor Investment Company.

== Personal life ==
On January 22, 1943, Burke married Ann Gertrude Rock, with whom he had one son.
