= Mawrdew Czgowchwz =

1975 debut novel by James McCourt

- First edition
- Author: James McCourt
- Language: English
- Publisher: Farrar, Straus & Giroux
- Publication date: 1975
- ISBN: 0-374-20461-6 (first edition)
- Dewey Decimal: 813.54
- LC Class: PZ4.M13154 Maw

Mawrdew Czgowchwz is the debut novel of American writer James McCourt first published in 1975 by Farrar, Straus & Giroux. After falling out of print it was reprinted in a slightly revised form in 2002 by NYRB Classics.

The novel follows the cult around an opera singer called Mawrdew Czgowchwz, pronounced Mardu Gorgeous. Mawrdew was loosely based on real life opera singer Miliza Korjus.

McCourt continued to write various works about Mawrdew Czgowchwz after publication of his novel. In 1983 a story featuring the character entitled Mawrdew Czgowchwz in Dublin was published in the Summer issue of The Paris Review. In 2007 he published a sequel to the novel entitled Now Voyager.
