= Morgan J. Burke Jr. =

American judge and attorney (1906–1967)

Morgan J. Burke Jr. OMRI
- Born: December 24, 1906; Waterbury, Connecticut, United States
- Died: December 21, 1967 (aged 60); New York City, United States
- Education: St. Bonaventure University; Manhattan College; Fordham University School of Law
- Occupations: Judge; attorney; author
- Spouse: Fanny Thoms (m. 1933)
- Children: 2
- Relatives: John Luddy Burke (brother)
- Awards: Order of Merit of the Italian Republic (OMRI)

Morgan Joseph Burke Jr. OMRI (December 24, 1906 – December 21, 1967) was an American judge and attorney.

== Early life ==
Morgan Joseph Burke was born on December 24, 1906, in Waterbury, Connecticut. He had a younger brother, John Luddy Burke, a United States Navy officer and business executive.

Burke received his education in New York City. He attended St. Bonaventure University from 1924 to 1925, followed by Manhattan College, where he played for the Manhattan Jaspers, graduating then in 1927 and proceeding to Fordham University School of Law, which he attended from 1928 to 1932.

== Career ==
Burke was a partner of Dorsey, Burke and Griffin, a "very respected" admiralty-law firm which practiced at 44 Wall Street, New York.

In 1951, Burke co-authored a book, Overseas Tankship Corp v. Keen U.S. Supreme Court Transcript of Record with Supporting Pleadings, which contained "the world's most comprehensive collection of records and briefs brought before the nation's highest court by leading legal practitioners."

On August 28, 1959, Burke was made a Knight of the Order of Merit of the Italian Republic in appreciation of his services to the Italian government. In particular, he was regarded as having settled the claims against the liner SS Andrea Doria as the Italian Line's chief lawyer. Andrea Doria received extensive media coverage in 1956 when she collided with the passenger liner Stockholm.

Burke was a municipal judge in Larchmont, New York, al judge.

From 1961, Burke was a member of the American Judicature Society.

== Personal life ==
Burke lived most of his adult life in Larchmont, New York. He died on December 21, 1967, in New York City from injuries incurred in a horse jumping accident.

== Personal life ==
Burke married Fanny Thoms in 1933. The two announced their engagement in July of that year. They had two daughters, Sandra and Susan.
