= St. Raymond High School for Boys =

Location
- 2151 St. Raymond Avenue; Parkchester, Bronx, New York 10462; United States; 40°50′16″N 73°51′14″W

Information
- Type: Private, all-male
- Religious affiliation: Roman Catholic
- Patron saint: St. Raymond Nonnatus
- Established: 1960 (66 years ago)
- Founder: John Corrigan
- Principal: Judith Carew
- Pastor: James Cruz
- Grades: 9–12
- Colors: Blue and orange
- Sports: Baseball, basketball, bowling, golf, lacrosse, soccer
- Team name: Ravens
- Accreditation: Middle States Association of Colleges and Schools
- Newspaper: The Raven Record
- Website: straymondhighschool.org

St. Raymond High School for Boys is an American parochial high school, located in the Parkchester section of the Bronx, New York.

Affiliated with the Catholic schools of the Roman Catholic Archdiocese of New York, it is accredited by the Board of Regents of the University of the State of New York, the Middle States Association of Colleges and Schools, and the Brothers of the Christian Schools.

The school is a recipient of a Blue Ribbon School of Excellence Award (1994–1996), and holds memberships with the National Catholic Educational Association and the Catholic Administrators Association of New York State.

The school's mascot is the Raven.

== Notable alumni ==
- Darryl Bryant – professional basketball player
- Mark Gjonaj – member of the New York City Council
- Julius Hodge – professional basketball player
- Allan Ray – professional basketball player
- Kareem Reid – professional basketball player
- Terrence Rencher – professional basketball player
- Isaiah Washington (basketball) - professional basketball player
