= Mike Reilly (coach) =

American athlete and coach (1899–1971)

Biographical details
- Born: May 7, 1899
- Died: December 31, 1971 (aged 72)

Playing career

Football
- 1921–1924: St. Bonaventure

Basketball
- 1921–1925: St. Bonaventure

Coaching career (HC unless noted)

Football
- 1930–1942: St. Bonaventure

Basketball
- 1928–1943: St. Bonaventure

Baseball
- 1931–1932: St. Bonaventure

Administrative career (AD unless noted)
- 1930–1943: St. Bonaventure

Head coaching record
- Overall: 43–43–10 (football); 132–76 (basketball)

Carroll "Mike" Reilly (May 7, 1899 – December 31, 1971) was an American football, basketball, and baseball player and coach. He served as the head football (1930–1942), basketball (1928–1943) and baseball (1931–1932) coach at St. Bonaventure University in Allegany, New York. The home basketball arena at St. Bonaventure, the Reilly Center, is named in his honor.
