= Charlene Costanzo =

American author and inspirational speaker

- Born: Charlene Ann Gorda; March 30, 1949 (age 77); Elizabeth, New Jersey, United States
- Education: St. Bonaventure University; University of Santa Monica
- Occupations: Author, speaker, and experiential workshop facilitator
- Spouse(s): Frank Costanzo (1969–present; 2 children)
- Writing career
- Genres: Non-fiction, life lessons, inspiration, spirituality, parenting self-help books
- Website: www.charlenecostanzo.com

Charlene Costanzo is a motivational author and speaker. She also facilitates experiential workshops. She is known as the author of The Twelve Gifts collection of books.

== Early life ==
Costanzo was born in Elizabeth, New Jersey in 1949 and grew up in Linden, New Jersey with her parents and brother. She earned a B.A. in Philosophy from St. Bonaventure University and an M.A. in Spiritual Psychology from the University of Santa Monica.

== Career ==
Costanzo says that helping children of all ages to build inner strength and self-worth is the primary intention of her work.

Costanzo began writing The Twelve Gifts collection of books in 1987 with The Twelve Gifts of Birth as a fable with life lessons for her teenage daughters. In 1999, she published the book and discussed its message in hospitals, churches, prisons, and schools throughout the United States in what she called the Polished Stone Tour.

During that one-year book tour to launch The Twelve Gifts of Birth, Charlene and her husband lived in a motor home in 48 of the 50 states. At the end of that tour, Costanzo sold rights for the independently-published book to HarperCollins.

Costanzo's second, book, The Twelve Gifts for Healing was written while she was in treatment for advanced Non-Hodgkin's lymphoma in 2001. Her third book, The Twelve Gifts in Marriage was published in 2005. In 2011 Costanzo published The Thirteenth Gift, a novella. In 2012 she published Touchstones: Stories for Living The Twelve Gifts, a narrative of stories that demonstrate the gifts at work in everyday life.

Costanzo won the Glyph Best Book Award for The Twelve Gifts of Birth; the Glyph Best Inspirational/Spiritual Book for The Twelve Gifts of Birth; the Glyph Best Gift Book for The Twelve Gifts of Birth; the ForeWord Magazine Bronze Award for The Twelve Gifts of Birth; MIPA awards for The Twelve Gifts of Birth in three categories; a Gold IPPY Award for The Thirteenth Gift; a Silver IPPY for Touchstones: Stories for Living The Twelve Gifts, and the SCOTTY for outstanding literary achievement for The Twelve Gifts of Birth.

== Personal life ==
Costanzo has been married to Frank T. Costanzo since 1969 and has two children. She and her husband live in Florida.
