= Robert Kochersberger =

Robert C. Kochersberger Jr. (born 25 April 1950) (also published as Bob Kochersberger) is an American writer and associate professor of English at North Carolina State University in Raleigh, North Carolina, where he has taught since 1986. He received his BA in journalism from St. Bonaventure University in 1972, MS from Syracuse University in 1979, and PhD from the University of Tennessee in 1986. Kochersberger is an expert on the muckraking journalism era and has published extensively on Ida Tarbell. He routinely contributes to the News & Observer.

== Career ==
Robert Kochersberger has written and lectured extensively on the muckraking era in journalism, focusing on Ida Tarbell. Having grown up in Chautauqua County, New York, where Tarbell’s journalism career began, Kochersberger held a particular interest in her. In 1994, he published More Than A Muckraker: Ida Tarbell’s Lifetime in Journalism. The book was re-issued in paperback in 1996. His research led to his being chosen by the U.S. Postal Service to assist in the design of the Ida Tarbell stamp, released in 2002.

Kochersberger has been awarded three traditional Fulbright scholarships and two Fulbright Senior Specialist grants intended for U.S. professionals to travel overseas to assist in curriculum development in their field. In 1991, he worked at the University of Ljubljana in then-Yugoslavia (now Slovenia) advising in journalism and communications as a Fulbright Senior Scholar. In 1993 he consulted with Al Ahram newspaper in Cairo, and in 2002, he advised at Thammasat University in Bangkok as a Fulbright Senior Specialist. In 2003, he returned to the University of Ljubljana again as a Senior Scholar. And in the spring 2016 semester he had another Fulbright senior scholar grant at the University of Constantine the Philosopher in Nitra, Slovakia.

Kochersberger worked as a reporter throughout the 1970s in southwest New York, first at The Post-Journal in Jamestown then at The Daily Press in Binghamton. At that point, Kochersberger turned to teaching, ultimately joining NC State’s English department in 1986. He has led various committees and programs within the department, and currently heads the journalism program.

== Publications ==
In addition to his years as a reporter, Kochersberger has published in academic journals and regularly contributes to Raleigh’s News & Observer. His subject matter ranges from aviation to gun control to fracking. In April 2014, Kochersberger was a contestant on "Jeopardy!".

Kochersberger is an avid aviation fan, and has been a certified private pilot since 1999. As a child, he often visited the Buffalo airport in New York to watch airplanes on the runway. In 1975, while reporting in Binghamton, Kochersberger was able to participate in a local air show with a Navy Blue Angel for an article. Weeks later, he was able to wing walk on a Stearman biplane, once again for an article. Years later, he recalled the experience: “I could not believe the force of the wind and cursed for the duration of the flight, maybe 10 minutes, but got a great story in that day’s newspaper.”

In 2005, Kochersberger’s son committed robberies around Raleigh, which was reported on by The News & Observer. The journalist who reported on the crimes included Kochersberger and his wife’s names, careers, and places of employment in the report. Kochersberger, himself a journalist by trade, felt the tables turned and explored that idea in his article, “My Son’s Crime,” which was published in the Columbia Journalism Review.

On 5 July 2007, Kochersberger’s son, Charlie, took his own life after years of addiction and mental illness. Charlie’s death has influenced much of Kochersberger’s writing since then.

In 2012, Kochersberger was working on a memoir about his relationship with his son, titled “Sorry to Freak You Out.”
