= B. J. Salerno =

Current position
- Title: Pitching coach
- Team: St. Bonaventure
- Conference: Atlantic 10

Playing career
- 2006–2009: St. Bonaventure
- Position: Catcher

Coaching career (HC unless noted)
- 2013: Jamestown CC (H/C/OF)
- 2014–2021: St. Bonaventure (P/C/RC)
- 2022: St. Bonaventure (Interim)
- 2023–present: St. Bonaventure (P)

Head coaching record
- Overall: 5–39
- Tournaments: NCAA: 0–0

Brandon J. Salerno is a baseball coach and former catcher, who is the current pitching coach for the St. Bonaventure Bonnies. He played college baseball at St. Bonaventure from 2006 to 2009 for head coach Larry Sudbrook. He served as the head coach of the St. Bonaventure Bonnies (2022).

== Playing career ==
Salerno went to Warren Area High School in Warren, Pennsylvania, where he played catcher.

Salerno attended the St. Bonaventure University in St. Bonaventure, New York. He was a member of the St. Bonaventure baseball team.

== Coaching career ==
Salerno joined the coaching staff at Jamestown Community College. The following season, Salerno joined his alma mater, St. Bonaventure, as pitching and catching coach.

On October 12, 2021, Salerno was named the interim head baseball coach of the Bonnies, effective January 1, 2022, when Sudbrook would officially retire. Salerno was not retained as head coach after posting a 5–39 record in 2022. New head coach Jason Rathbun retained Salerno as the team's pitching coach.

== Head coaching record ==
Record table
Season	Team	Overall	Conference	Standing	Postseason
St. Bonaventure Bonnies (Atlantic 10 Conference) (2022)
2022	St. Bonaventure	5–39	3–21	12th	
St. Bonaventure:		5–39	3–21		
Total:		5–39			
National champion Postseason invitational champion Conference regular season champion Conference regular season and conference tournament champion Division regular season champion Division regular season and conference tournament champion Conference tournament champion
