= Tyler Relph =

American basketball trainer

Personal information
- Born: 15 June 1984 (age 42)
- Listed height: 6 ft 0 in (1.83 m)
- Listed weight: 185 lb (84 kg)

Career information
- High school: McQuaid Jesuit (Rochester, New York)
- College: West Virginia (2003–2004); St. Bonaventure (2005–2008)
- NBA draft: 2008: undrafted
- Position: Point guard
- Number: 10

Career highlights
- Mr. New York Basketball (2003)

Tyler Relph (born 15 June 1984) is an American basketball trainer and former player. He played college basketball for West Virginia University and St. Bonaventure University. He attended McQuaid Jesuit High School in Rochester, New York, where he was named Mr. New York Basketball after his senior year.

== High school career ==
Relph attended McQuaid Jesuit High School in Rochester, New York. During his senior season, he was named Mr. Basketball in New York after he averaged 22.1 points per game and led McQuaid to a 27-1 record and the state championship. He was named the tournament most valuable player after scoring 15 points in the championship clinching game. In 2016, he was inducted into the Section V Basketball Hall of Fame.

== College career ==
After graduating from high school in 2003, Relph received several NCAA Division I scholarship offers but eventually chose West Virginia University over Clemson and Rhode Island. During the season, he averaged 5.0 points in and 1.5 assists in 17.7 minutes per game. Unhappy with the teams playing style under coach John Beilein, he transferred to St. Bonaventure University after the season. He sat out his first season under NCAA transfer guidelines. In April 2005, he was suspended indefinitely after being charged with drunken driving. He was reinstated three months later. He went on to play 76 games for St. Bonaventure, including 53 starts, where he averaged 9.9 points and 3.9 assists per game. During his senior season, he averaged 11.9 points and 3.9 assists per game, and led the nation in free throw percent, making 93.8% of his attempts.

== Training ==
Shortly after his college career ended, Relph suffered a knee injury that sidelined him for 18 months. While recuperating, he worked on St. Bonaventure's staff under head coach Mark Schmidt as the Director of Player Personnel and Managers. After his experience on the coaching staff, he decided to abandon his playing career and become a basketball skills trainer. He would go on to work with players such as Amare Stoudemire, Julius Randle and Marcus Smart.
