= Darryl Bryant =

American basketball player

Free agent
- Position: Point guard / shooting guard

Personal information
- Born: April 25, 1990 (age 36) Brooklyn, New York, U.S.
- Listed height: 6 ft 1.5 in (1.87 m)
- Listed weight: 204 lb (93 kg)

Career information
- High school: St. Raymond (Brooklyn, New York)
- College: West Virginia (2008–2012)
- NBA draft: 2012: undrafted
- Playing career: 2012–present

Career history
- 2013–2014: Panthers Fürstenfeld
- 2014–2015: Kolín
- 2015–2016: Mens Sana 1871
- 2016: PAOK
- 2017: Szolnoki Olaj
- 2017: Kataja
- 2017–2018: Al Shamal
- 2018–2019: Levski Sofia
- 2019: BC Rustavi
- 2019: Goes Montevideo

Career highlights
- Bulgarian League champion (2018); Korisliiga champion (2017); Czech League scoring champion (2015); Third-team All-Big East (2012)

Darryl Bryant (born April 25, 1990) known also as Truck Bryant is an American professional basketball player. Standing at 1.87 m (6 ft 2 in), he plays at the shooting guard position. After playing four years of college basketball at West Virginia University, with the West Virginia Mountaineers, Bryant entered the 2012 NBA draft, but was not selected in the draft's two rounds.

== High school career ==
Bryant played high school basketball at St. Raymond High School for Boys in Bronx, New York.

== College career ==
Bryant played college basketball at West Virginia University, with the West Virginia Mountaineers, from 2008 to 2012. Under coach Bob Huggins, Bryant was one of the most stable players of the team during his time at West Virginia. At his senior year, Bryant went to average 19.4 points, 2.7 assists and 3 rebounds per game.

== Professional career ==
After going undrafted at the 2012 NBA draft, Bryant began his pro career in Austria, playing in the Austrian league with Panthers Fürstenfeld in 2013. He then played in Czech Republic, with the Czech League club BC Kolín. The following year, he played in Italy for Mens Sana 1871 averaging 17.5 points, 3.1 rebounds and 3.7 assists per game.

On July 26, 2016, Bryant moved to Greece, where he joined the Greek League club PAOK. In late December 2016, he left PAOK. On January 9, 2017, he signed with Hungarian club Szolnoki Olaj. He left Szolnok after appearing in four games. On February 27, 2017, he signed with Kataja Basket Club.

On February 22, 2018, Bryant signed with Levski Lukoil of the Bulgarian NBL.

In December 2018, Bryant moved to Rustavi in Georgian Basketball Super League but left the club after only five games. In January 2019, he signed with Goes Montevideo in Liga Uruguaya de Basketball.
