= Finger roll =

Basketball technique

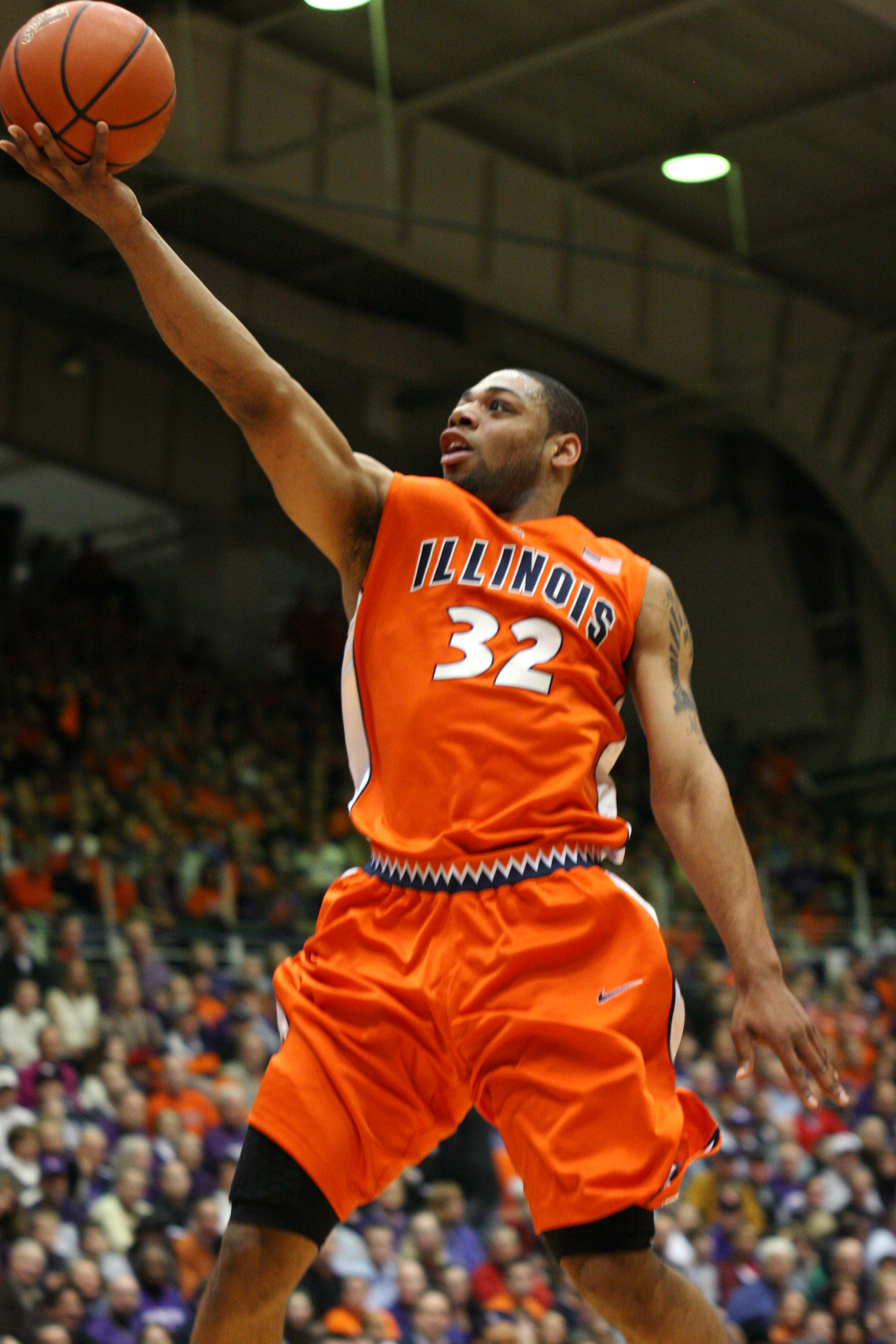
Demetri McCamey for the 2009–10 Illinois Fighting Illini

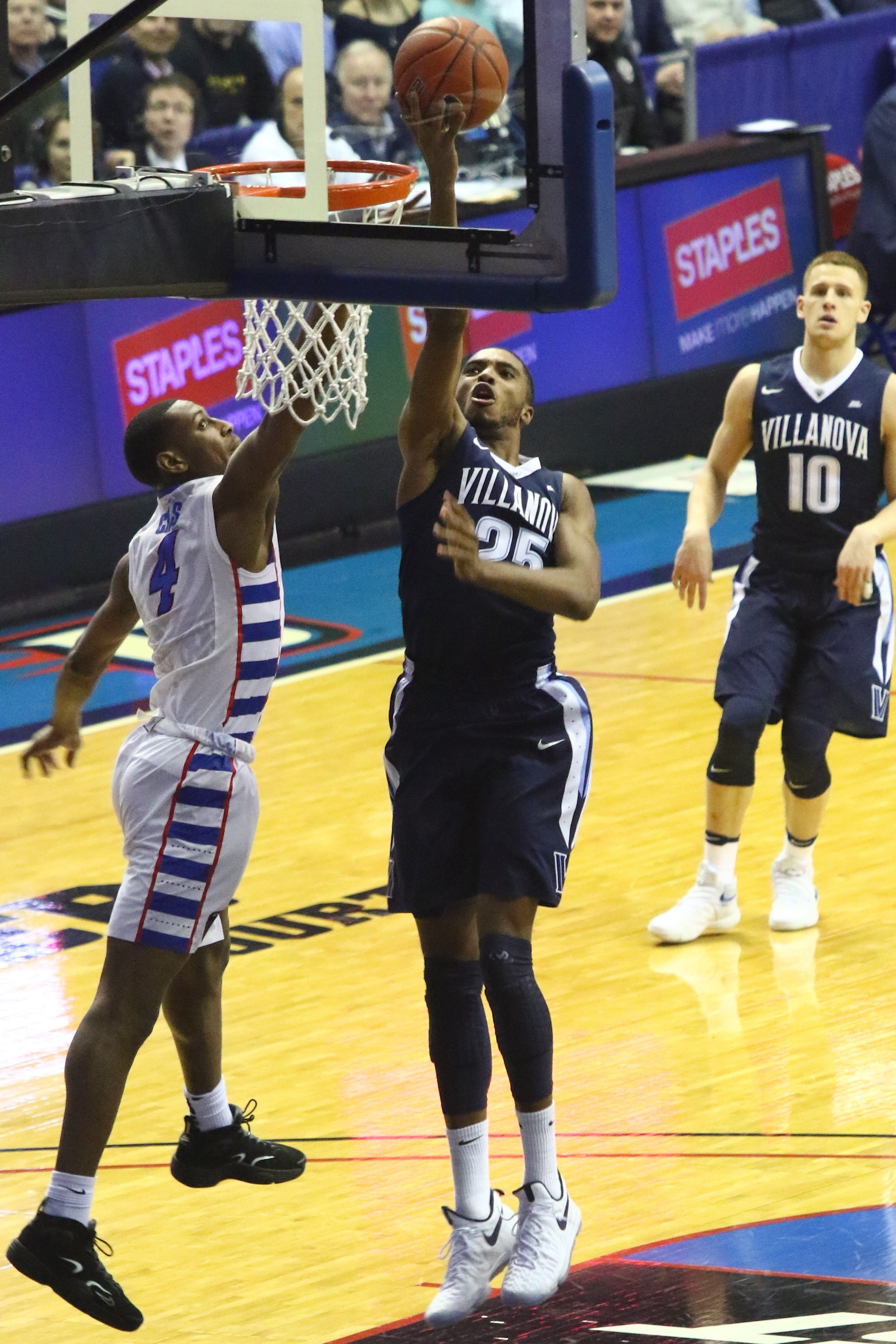
Mikal Bridges for the 2016–17 Villanova Wildcats

The finger roll is a specialized type of basketball layup shot where the ball is rolled off the tips of the player's fingers. The advantage of the finger roll is that the ball can travel high in the air over a defender that might otherwise block a regular jump shot or dunk, while the spin applied by the rolling over the fingers will carry the ball to the basket off the backboard. The shot was pioneered by center Wilt Chamberlain in the 1960s.

The finger roll is notorious for being very difficult to master, and few players use it as their primary shot. Another disadvantage is that the shot is one-handed, and therefore harder to protect the ball while executing. One famous exception was San Antonio Spurs forward George Gervin, who turned the shot into a nearly unstoppable weapon when he led the National Basketball Association (NBA) in scoring between 1978 and 1980.

Although the finger roll is a very challenging shot, it still has a high percentage of making the basket. Once there is opening down the lane for a layup, the finger roll is the most convenient due to distance away from the rim. If there is no defender guarding and trying to block the shot then it is hard to miss. The layup can help improve one's game because it can make it harder for defenders to defend by not knowing whether the offense is going for a finger roll or another layup.
