= Cara Cilano =

American professor

Cara Cilano is an American literary scholar and professor. She is the chair professor of English at Michigan State University. Cilano is also a published author of articles and books, being largely collected by libraries worldwide. She previously held the Fulbright Visiting Professor at University of Graz.

== Bibliography ==
- National identities in Pakistan: the 1971 war in contemporary Pakistani fiction (2011)
- Contemporary Pakistani Fiction in English: Idea, Nation, State (2013)
- Post-9/11 Espionage Fiction in the US and Pakistan (2014)
