= Vincent Virga =

American writer

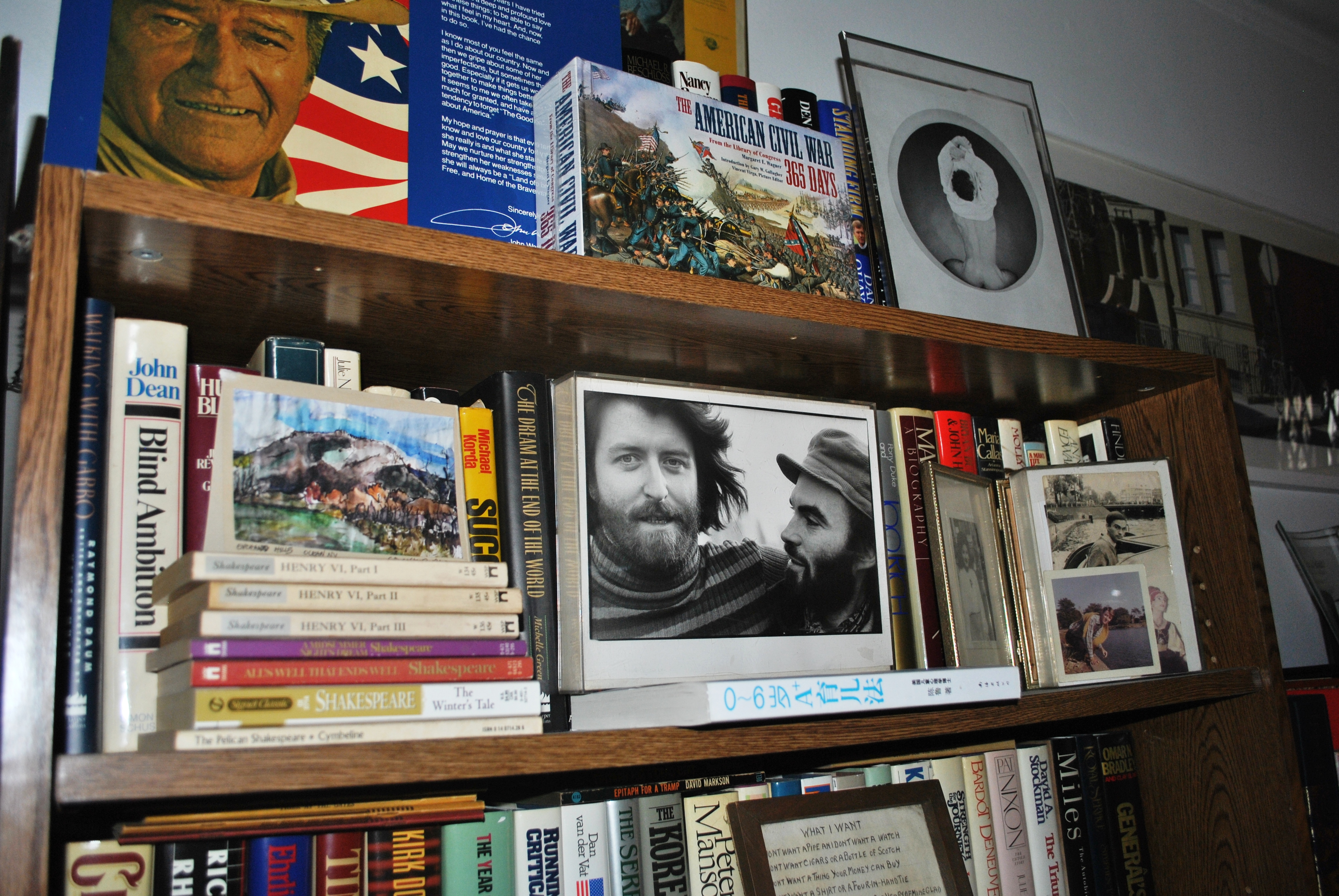
- "The central photo was taken by Laura Rubin a long time ago, and the ones on the far right were taken even longer ago: Jimmy McCourt in Central Park the summer before we met at Yale in '64 and me getting on a boat in Amsterdam in '65." Vincent Virga
- Born: September 28, 1942 (age 84); New York City, U.S.
- Education: St. Bonaventure University (BA); Yale School of Drama
- Occupations: Editor; writer
- Partner: James McCourt

Vincent Virga (born September 28, 1942) is a gay American-born editor and writer. He is the author of the novels Gaywyck (1980), A Comfortable Corner (1982), and Vadriel Vail (2001). His life partner since 1964 is fellow writer James McCourt. McCourt's and Virga's papers are held at Yale's Beinecke Rare Book & Manuscript Library.

== Life ==
Vincent Virga was born and grew up in New York City. In 1952 the family moved to Lindenhurst, New York.

Virga attended St. Bonaventure University, (B.A., 1964) and Yale University (1964–1965). In 1964 at Yale he met fellow student James McCourt, who was to become his life partner. They were both enrolled in the acting program at Yale School of Drama, but Virga was not happy with the teaching at Yale, and therefore he and McCourt left to explore the theater scene in London. They lived in London from 1964 to 1967 and again from 1969 to 1971, both doing odd-jobs. Virga first job was as a typesetter at The New York Review of Books.

Virga and McCourt moved to New York City in the 1970s, where they currently live, in the same apartment they have rented since that time. They also spend time in Washington, D.C. (for Virga's work at the Library of Congress), and Ireland (where Virga has the role of United States Representative of the Jackie Clarke Collection in Ballina, County Mayo).

Vincent Virga was a friend of Susan Sontag (whom he met while working as a typesetter at The New York Review of Books) and poet James Schuyler. Cartographia: Mapping Civilizations (2007) is dedicated to Sontag, McCourt and Victoria de los Angeles, a friend of both McCourt and Virga.

== Work ==
Vincent Virga's first novel, Gaywyck (1980), was also the first gay gothic romance ever published. Vadriel Vail (2001, nominated 14th Lambda Literary Awards) and Children of Paradise (2010) are the second and third books in the series of Gaywyck. A Comfortable Corner (1982) is a contemporary novel dealing with the issue of alcoholism in the gay community.

Virga is also an expert on cartography, and has a close collaboration with the Library of Congress. His researches on cartography have been published by the Library of Congress since the beginning of the 2000s.

Other than publishing his own work, since 1973 Virga is a photo editor and consultant for other authors. He has researched the picture sections of more than 150 books, including the biography of John Wayne, Jane Fonda, Arianna Huffington Stassinopoulos, Hillary Clinton, and Bill Clinton.

== Bibliography ==
Fiction

- Gaywyck (1980)
- A Comfortable Corner (1982)
- Theatricals (1987)
- Vadriel Vail--Gaywyck II (2001)
- Early Ripe (2003)
- Herald Angel (2006)
- Children of Paradise--Gaywyck III (2010)
- Three (2015)
- Nightsong (2017)

Nonfiction

- Deals (1981), with Cheryl Moch
- Summer (1990), with Alice Gordon
- Eisenhower (1991), with Michael Beschloss
- The Eighties (1992), with foreword by Richard Rhodes
- Eyes of the Nation: A Visual History of the United States (1997), with The Library of Congress and Alan Brinkley
- The American Civil War: 365 Days (2005), with Margaret Wagner and The Library of Congress, Introduction by Gary Gallagher
- Cartographia: Mapping Civilizations (2007), with The Library of Congress and Introduction by Ronald E. Grim
- Historic Maps and Views of New York (2008)
- Connecticut: Mapping the Nutmeg State through History (2009), with Diana Ross McCain
- Colorado: Mapping the Centennial State through History (2009), with Stephen Grace
- California: Mapping the Golden State through History (2009), with Ray Jones
- Texas: Mapping the Lone Star State through History (2010), with Don Blevins
- Massachusetts: Mapping the Bay State through History (2010), with Dan Spinella
- Illinois: Mapping the Prairie State through History (2010), with Scotti Cohn
- Florida: Mapping the Sunshine State through History (2010), with E. Lynne Wright
- Virginia: Mapping the Old Dominion State through History (2011), with Emilee Hines
- Mapping Ireland (2012), with Sinead McCoole
- Civil War Sketch Book: Drawings From The Battlefront (2012), with Harry Katz, Preface by Alan Brinkley

Photo editing (not inclusive list)

- Allen, Margaret. Selling Dreams: Inside the Beauty Business
- Ambrose, Stephen. Nixon: Ruin and Recovery, 1963-1990
- Andersen, Christopher. The Serpent's Tooth: A Family Story of Greed, Vengeance, and Multiple Murder
- Balinger, Bill. The Lost City of Stone: The Story of Nan Madol, The Atlantis of the Pacific
- Barrett, Wayne. Trump: The Greatest Show on Earth
- Barrett, Wayne. Trump: The Deals and the Downfall
- Barry, Stephen. Royal Service: My Twelve Years as Valet to Prince Charles
- Bass, Jack. Unlikely Heroes: The Implementation of the Brown Decision in the South by Southern Federal Judges
- Bender, Marilyn & Selig Altshul. The Chosen Instrument: Pan Am, Juan Trippe, The Rise and Fall of an American Entrepreneur
- Bernstein, Leonard. Findings: Fifty Years of Meditations on Music
- Beschloss, Michael. The Crisis Years: Kennedy and Khrushchev, 1960-1963
- Biddle, Wayne. Barons of the Sky: From Early Flight to Strategic Warfare
- Birmingham, Stephen. California Rich
- Birmingham, Stephen. The Grandes Dames: From the Gilded Age to Modern Times
- Bradley, Omar. A General's Life
- Brill, Stephen. The Teamsters
- Brynner, Rock. Yul: The Man Who Would Be King
- Burrough, Bryan & John Helyar. Barbarians at the Gate: The Fall of RJR Nabisco
- Califano Jr., Joseph A. Governing America, A Memoir
- Caute, David. The Year of the Barricades: A Journey Through 1968
- Chaney, Lindsay & Cieply Chaney. The Hearsts
- Chesler, Phyllis. About Men
- Clarke, Gerald. Capote, A Biography
- Clinton, Bill. My Life
- Clinton, Hillary Rodham. Living History, An Autobiography
- Clinton, Hillary Rodham. It Takes a Village (Tenth Anniversary Edition)
- Cohen, William & George Mitchell. Men of Zeal: The Candid Inside Story of the Iran-Contra Hearings
- Cohen, Marcia. The Sisterhood; The Inside Story of the Women's Movement
- Colby, William. Honorable Men: My Life in the CIA
- Collins, Joan. Past Imperfect: An Autobiography
- Cooke, Hope. Time Change, An Autobiography
- Cronkite, Walter. A Reporter's Life
- Davidson, Frank. Macro: Big is Beautiful
- Davis, Miles & Quincy Troupe. Miles: The Autobiography
- Dean, John. Blind Ambition
- Delderfield, R. F. Napoleon in Love
- Donahue, Phil. Donaghue: My Own Story
- Douglas, Kirk. The Ragman's Son, An Autobiography
- Dryer, Peter. Martyrs and Fanatics: South Africa and Human Destinies
- Dubinsky, David. A Reporter's Memoir
- Duke, Pony & Jason Thomas. Too Rich: The Family Secrets of Doris Duke
- Dunne, Gerald. Hugo Black and the Judicial Revolution
- Durant, Will & Ariel. Will and Ariel Durant: A Dual Autobiography
- Edwards, Anne. Vivien Leigh, A Biography
- Edwards, Anne. Sonya: The Life of Countess Tolstoy
- Ehrlichman, John. Witness to Power
- Eisenhower, Julie Nixon. Special People
- Eisenhower, Julie Nixon. Pat Nixon: The Untold Story
- Fairchild, John. Chic Savages
- Falwell, Jerry. Strength for the Journey
- Farnan, Dorothy. Auden in Love
- Flamini, Roland. Ava: A Biography of Ava Gardner
- Flippo, Chet. Your Cheatin' Heart: A Biography of Hank Williams
- Flexner, Stuart. Listening to America
- Follett, Ken. On Wings of Eagles
- Fonda, Jane. Jane Fonda's Workout Book
- Fonda, Jane. Jane Fonda's New Workout Book
- Fonda, Jane. Women Coming of Age
- Ford, Daniel. Cult of the Atom
- Fried, Stephen. Thing of Beauty: The Tragedy of Supermodel Gia
- Friedrich, Otto. Clover: The Tragic Love Story of Clover and Henry Adams
- Gaylin, Willard. The Killing of Bonnie Garland
- Givner, Joan. Katherine Anne Porter: A Life
- Gorgakas, Dan. The Methuselah Factor
- Green, Michelle. The Dream at the End of the World: Paul Bowles and the Literary Renegades in Tangier
- Gretsky, Wayne & Rick Reilly. Gretsky: An Autobiography
- Griffin, Merv. Merv: Making the Good Life Last
- Gronowicz, Antoni. Garbo: Her Story
- Grunwald, Lisa & Stephen Adler. American Women's Letters
- Grunwald, Lisa & Stephen Adler. Letters of the Century
- Harman, Nicholas. Dunkirk, The Necessary Myth
- Harris, Jay. TV Guide; The First 2 Years
- Hastings, Max. The Korean War
- Heilbrun, Carolyn. Education of a Woman: The Life of Gloria Steinem
- Houseman, John. Final Dress, An Autobiography
- Houseman, John. Front and Center, An Autobiography
- Houseman, John, Run-Through, An Autobiography
- Hovig, Thomas. The Search for Tutankhamun
- Judis, John. William F. Buckley, Jr., A Biography
- Judson, Horace. The Eighth Day of Creation
- Kaplan, Justin. Walt Whitman: A Life
- Kelley, Kitty. Elizabeth Taylor: The Last Star
- Kelley, Kitty. Nancy Reagan: The Unauthorized Biography
- Kelley, Kitty. The Royals: The British Royal Family
- Kennedy, Edward. Our Day and Celebration
- Kinney, Jean. An American Journey: The Short Life of Willy Wolfe
- Koch, Ed. Mayor
- Koch, Ed. Politics
- Korda, Michael. Success: How Every Man and Woman Can Achieve It
- Languth, A.J. Saki: A Life of Hector Hugh Munro
- Laqueur, William. Breaking The Silence: The Germans who Exposed The Final Solution
- Leamer, Barbara. Polanski: The Filmmaker As Voyeur, A Biography
- Leamer, Laurence. Ascent: The Physical and Spiritual Quest of Legendary Mountaineer Willi Unsoeld
- Leamer, Laurence. Make Believe: The Story of Nancy and Ronald Reagan
- Lessard, Suzannah. The Architect Of Desire: Beauty and Danger in the Stanford White Family
- Lindsey, Robert. The Falcon and the Snowman
- Lindsey, Robert. A Gathering Of Saints: A True Story of Money, Murder, and Deceit
- Long, Jeff. Outlaw: The True Story of Claude Dallas
- Manso, Peter. Mailer: His Life and Times
- Matthews, Christopher. Bobby Kennedy: A Raging Spirit
- Matthews, Christopher. Jack Kennedy: Elusive Hero
- McCourt, James. Queer Street
- Merman, Ethel. Merman
- Michaud, Stephen & Hugh Aynsworth. The Only Living Witness: The True Story of Serial Sex Killer Ted Bundy
- Milford, Nancy. Savage Beauty: The Life of Edna St. Vincent Millay
- Millett, Kate. The Basement: Meditations on a Human Sacrifice
- Moore, Honor. The White Blackbird: A Life of the Painter Margarett Sargent by Her Granddaughter
- Morgan, Kay Summersby. Past Forgetting: My Love Affair with Dwight D. Eisenhower
- Morgan, Ted. Maugham, A Biography
- Morgan, Ted. Churchill: Young Man in a Hurry, 1874-1915
- Morrisroe, Patricia. Mapplethorpe, A Biography
- Munro, Eleanor. American Women Artists
- Murphy, Patrick. Commissioner
- Muse, Vance. Garbo Walking
- Neff, Donald. Warriors at Suez
- Newfield, Jack & Wayne Barrett. City For Sale: Ed Koch and the Betrayal of New York
- North, Oliver. Under Fire: An American Story
- Olivier, Laurence. Laurence Olivier: Confessions of an Actor
- Olivier, Laurence. Laurence Olivier: On Acting
- O'Neill, William. A Better World: Stalinism and the American Intellectuals
- Oppenheimer, Jerry. State of a Union: Inside the Complex Marriage of Bill and Hillary Clinton
- Oppenheimer, Jerry. Seinfeld: The Making of an American Icon
- Pakula, Hannah. The Last Romantic: A Biography of Marie Queen of Roumania
- Pearl, Minnie. Minnie Pearl, An Autobiography
- Persico, Joseph. The Imperial Rockefeller
- Picon, Molly. Molly by Molly
- Quayle, Dan. Standing Firm: A Vice-Presidential Memoir
- Reston Jr., James. The Lone Star: The Life of John Connally
- Rhodes, Richard. The Making of the Atomic Bomb
- Robinson, Archie. George Meany and His Times
- Robinson, Roxana. Georgia O'keeffe: A Life
- Rollins, Ed, & Tom DeFrank. Bare Knuckles and Back Rooms: My Life in American Politics
- Rooney, Andy. A Few Minutes with Andy Rooney
- Root, Waverly. Food: An Authoritative and Visual History and Dictionary of the Foods of the World
- Schickel, Richard. D.W. Griffith: An American Life
- Sculley, John. Odyssey: Pepsi to Apple
- Sharon, Ariel. Warrior, An Autobiography
- Shawcross, William. Sideshow: Kissinger, Nixon, and the Destruction of Cambodia
- Sheehy, Gail. The Man who Changed the World: The Lives of Mikhail Gorbachev
- Siegel, Richard. The Jewish Almanac
- Smith, Richard Norton. Thomas E. Dewey and His Times
- Stassinopoulos, Arianna. Maria Callas: The Woman Behind the Legend
- Stassinopoulos, Arianna Huffington. Picasso: Creator and Destroyer
- Stewart, James B. Den of Thieves
- Stockman, David. The Triumph of Politics: Why the Reagan Revolution Failed
- Thomas, Bob. Joan Crawford, A Biography
- Thomas, Evan. The Man to See: Edward Bennett Williams
- Tyler, Patrick. Running Critical: The Silent War, Rickover, and General Dynamics
- Vadim, Roger. Bardot, Deneuve, Fonda: My Life with the Three Most Beautiful Women in the World
- Van der Vat, Dan. The Pacific Campaign
- Viorst, Milton. Fire in the Streets: America in the 1960s
- Wagner-Martin, Linda. Sylvia Plath, A Biography
- Wallachinsky, David & Amy Wallace. The Book Of Lists
- Wallachinsky, David & Amy Wallace. The People's Almanac 2
- Watt, Richard. Bitter Glory: History of Poland
- Wayne, John. America, Why I Love Her
- Westin, Av. Newswatch
- Wilkins, Roger. A Man's Life, An Autobiography
- Winters, Shelley. Shelley II
- Wolfe, Linda. Wasted: The Preppie Murder
- Wolfe, Linda. Double Life
- Wyden, Peter. Bay Of Pigs
- Wynette, Tammy. Stand by your Man, An Autobiography
