= Frijoles Creek =

Stream in northern New Mexico, US

Coordinates: 35°45′14″N 106°15′18″W

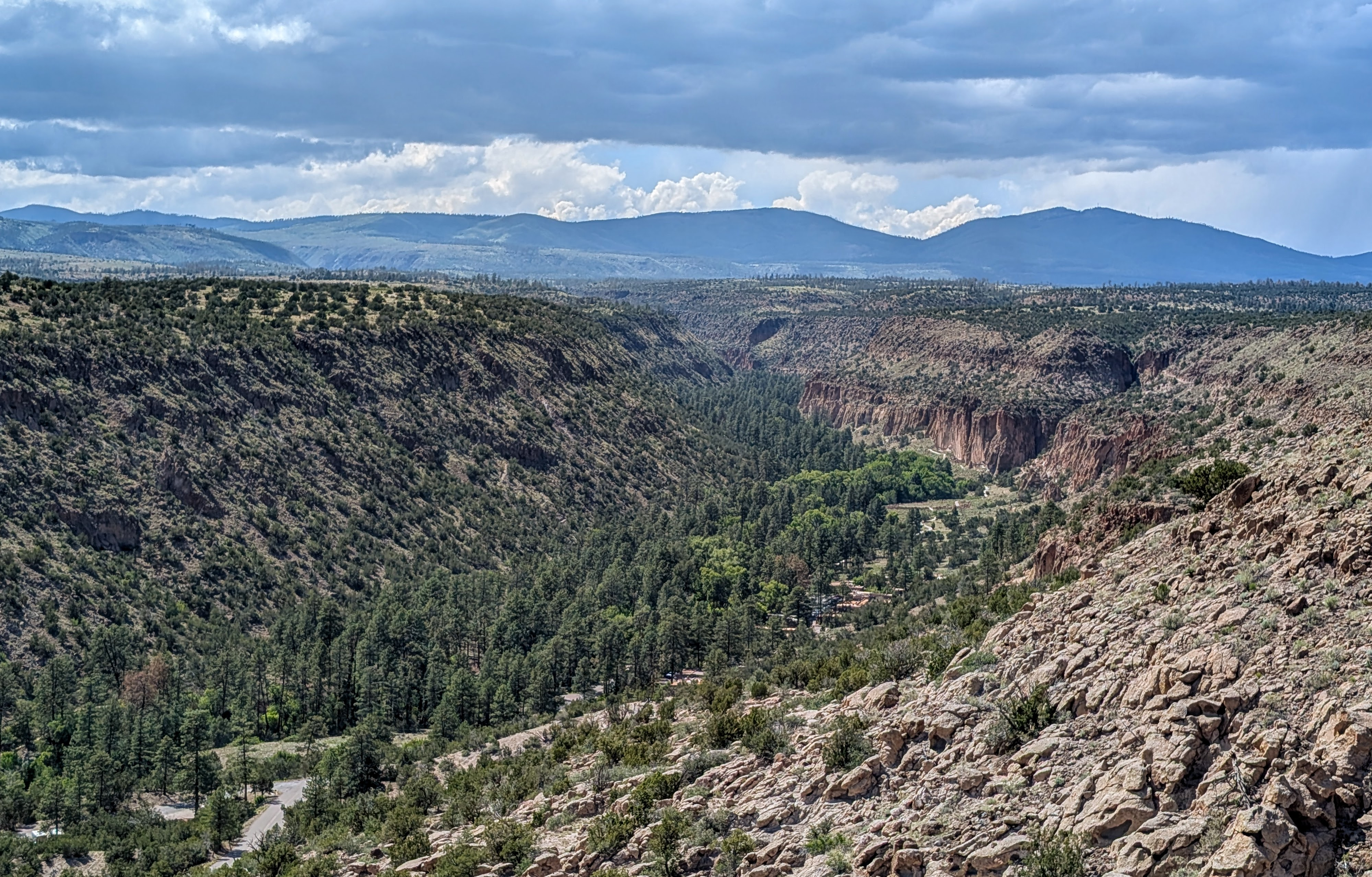
Frijoles Canyon from the Bandelier National Monument Entrance Road scenic overlook

Frijoles Creek, or Rito de los Frijoles, (Eastern Keres: Tyóʼonye Kʼáǐhʼya, Tewa: Puwhigeˀin Tsʼêe) is a 14-mile stream in the Pajarito Plateau of New Mexico. It flows from the slopes of the 10,207-foot (3,111 m) Cerro Grande Peak, through Frijoles Canyon in the Bandelier National Monument, to the Rio Grande at about 5,600 feet (1,700 m). Tyuonyi is in the canyon.
