= 1948 Bowling Green Falcons football team =

American college football season

1948 Bowling Green Falcons football
- Conference: Independent
- Record: 8–0–1
- Head coach: Robert Whittaker (8th season)
- Captain: Vern Dunham
- Home stadium: University Stadium

1948 Midwestern non-major college football independents records
	Conf.			Overall
Team	W	L	T	W		L		T
Michigan Tech		–		7	–	0	–	0
Bowling Green		–		8	–	0	–	1
Washington University		–		9	–	1	–	0
John Carroll		–		7	–	1	–	2
Ashland		–		6	–	1	–	2
Ball State		–		6	–	2	–	0
Dayton		–		7	–	2	–	1
Baldwin–Wallace		–		5	–	2	–	2
Indiana State		–		4	–	4	–	0
Wabash		–		4	–	4	–	0
Wayne		–		4	–	4	–	0
Valparaiso		–		4	–	5	–	0
Toledo		–		5	–	6	–	0
Michigan State Normal		–		3	–	5	–	0
Xavier		–		4	–	6	–	0
Central Michigan		–		3	–	6	–	0

The 1948 Bowling Green Falcons football team, sometimes known as the Beegees, was an American football team that represented Bowling Green State College (later renamed Bowling Green State University) as an independent during the 1948 college football season. In their eighth season under head coach Robert Whittaker, the Falcons compiled an 8–0–1 record and outscored opponents by a total of 230 to 100. Vern Dunham was the team captain.

In the final Litkenhous Difference by Score System ratings for 1948, Bowling Green was ranked at No. 100.

The team compiled its home games at University Stadium in Bowling Green, Ohio.

The school registered a record-breaking enrollment of 4,525 students at the beginning of the 1948-49 school year.

== Schedule ==
Date	Opponent	Site	Result	Attendance	Source
September 25	at Ohio	Peden Stadium; Athens, OH	W 13–7		
October 2	at Central Michigan	Alumni Field; Mount Pleasant, MI	W 13–12		
October 9	at Toledo	Glass Bowl; Toledo, MI (rivalry)	W 21–6		
October 16	Morris Harvey	University Stadium; Bowling Green, OH	W 48–6		
October 23	Baldwin-Wallace^{†}	University Stadium; Bowling Green, OH	W 33–28	7,205	
October 30	at Findlay	Donnell Stadium; Findlay, OH	W 28–7		
November 6	at Kent State	Kent, OH (rivalry)	W 23–14		
November 13	Morningside	University Stadium; Bowling Green, OH	W 38–7		
November 20	John Carroll	University Stadium; Bowling Green, OH	T 13–13		
^{†}Homecoming
