= 1948 Ohio Bobcats football team =

American college football season

1948 Ohio Bobcats football
- Conference: Mid-American Conference
- Record: 3–6 (2–3 MAC)
- Head coach: Harold Wise (2nd season)
- Home stadium: Peden Stadium

1948 Mid-American Conference football standings
	Conf.					Overall
Team	W		L		T	W		L		T
Miami (OH) $	4	–	0	–	0	7	–	1	–	1
Western Michigan	3	–	1	–	0	6	–	3	–	0
Cincinnati	3	–	1	–	0	3	–	6	–	1
Ohio	2	–	3	–	0	3	–	6	–	0
Western Reserve	1	–	4	–	0	1	–	8	–	1
Butler	0	–	4	–	0	3	–	5	–	0
$ – Conference champion

The 1948 Ohio Bobcats football team was an American football team that represented Ohio University in the Mid-American Conference (MAC) during the 1948 college football season. In their second and final season under head coach Harold Wise, the Bobcats compiled a 3–6 record (2–3 against MAC opponents), finished in fourth place in the MAC, and were outscored by all opponents by a combined total of 179 to 98. Three Ohio players received All-MAC honors: end John Marco (first team); halfback Jim McKenna (second team); and offensive guard Milt Taylor (second team). They played their home games in Peden Stadium in Athens, Ohio.

Ohio was ranked at No. 170 in the final Litkenhous Difference by Score System ratings for 1948.

== Schedule ==
Date	Time	Opponent	Site	Result	Attendance	Source
September 25		Toledo*	Peden Stadium; Athens, OH	L 7–13		
October 2		at Washington and Lee*	Victory Stadium; Roanoke, VA	L 0–13		
October 9		at Cincinnati	Nippert Stadium; Cincinnati, OH	L 13–18		
October 16		Western Reserve	Peden Stadium; Athens, OH	W 37–7		
October 23		Miami (OH)	Peden Stadium; Athens, OH (rivalry)	L 0–21	12,000	
October 30		Duquesne*	Peden Stadium; Athens, OH	W 14–13		
November 6		at West Virginia*	Mountaineer Field; Morgantown, WV	L 6–48	5,000	
November 13	2:30 p.m.	at Butler	Butler Bowl; Indianapolis, IN	W 14–6	5,000	
November 20		Western Michigan	Peden Stadium; Athens, OH	L 7–40		
*Non-conference game; All times are in Eastern time
