= 1948 Southern Illinois Maroons football team =

American college football season

1948 Southern Illinois Maroons football
- Conference: Illinois Intercollegiate Athletic Conference
- Record: 2–6 (0–4 IIAC)
- Head coach: Glenn Martin (9th season)
- Home stadium: McAndrew Stadium

1948 Illinois Intercollegiate Athletic Conference football standings
	Conf.					Overall
Team	W		L		T	W		L		T
Eastern Illinois $	4	–	0	–	0	7	–	3	–	0
Illinois State Normal	3	–	1	–	0	7	–	2	–	0
Northern Illinois State	2	–	2	–	0	6	–	4	–	0
Western Illinois	1	–	3	–	0	4	–	4	–	0
Southern Illinois	0	–	4	–	0	2	–	6	–	0
$ – Conference champion

The 1948 Southern Illinois Maroons football team was an American football team that represented Southern Illinois University (now known as Southern Illinois University Carbondale) in the Illinois Intercollegiate Athletic Conference (IIAC) during the 1948 college football season. Under ninth-year head coach Glenn Martin, the team compiled a 2–6 record. The team played its home games at McAndrew Stadium in Carbondale, Illinois.

== Schedule ==
Date	Opponent	Site	Result	Attendance	Source
September 25	at Wayne*	University of Detroit Stadium; Detroit, MI	L 0–26	8,000	
October 2	Southeast Missouri State*	McAndrew Stadium; Carbondale, IL	W 25–13		
October 9	Indiana State*	McAndrew Stadium; Carbondale, IL	W 20–6		
October 16	Western Illinois	McAndrew Stadium; Carbondale, IL	L 7–13		
October 23	at Northern Illinois State	Glidden Field; DeKalb, IL	L 7–25		
October 30	Arkansas State	McAndrew Stadium; Carbondale, IL	L 21–27		
November 6	Illinois State Normal	McAndrew Stadium; Carbondale, IL	L 0–48		
November 13	at Eastern Illinois	Charleston, IL	L 0–38		
*Non-conference game
