= 1948 Cincinnati Bearcats football team =

American college football season

1948 Cincinnati Bearcats football
- Conference: Mid-American Conference
- Record: 3–6–1 (3–1–0 MAC)
- Head coach: Ray Nolting (4th season)
- Captain: Roger Stephens
- Home stadium: Nippert Stadium

1948 Mid-American Conference football standings
	Conf.					Overall
Team	W		L		T	W		L		T
Miami (OH) $	4	–	0	–	0	7	–	1	–	1
Western Michigan	3	–	1	–	0	6	–	3	–	0
Cincinnati	3	–	1	–	0	3	–	6	–	1
Ohio	2	–	3	–	0	3	–	6	–	0
Western Reserve	1	–	4	–	0	1	–	8	–	1
Butler	0	–	4	–	0	3	–	5	–	0
$ – Conference champion

The 1948 Cincinnati Bearcats football team was an American football team that represented the University of Cincinnati as a member of the Mid-American Conference (MAC) during the 1948 college football season. The Bearcats were led by head coach Ray Nolting and compiled a 3–6–1 record.

Cincinnati was ranked at No. 113 in the final Litkenhous Difference by Score System ratings for 1948.

== Schedule ==
Date	Time	Opponent	Site	Result	Attendance	Source
September 25		Hardin–Simmons*	Nippert Stadium; Cincinnati, OH	T 7–7	22,000	
October 2		Xavier*	Nippert Stadium; Cincinnati, OH (rivalry)	L 7–13	28,000	
October 9		Ohio	Nippert Stadium; Cincinnati, OH	W 18–13		
October 16		at Mississippi State*	Scott Field; Starkville, MS	L 0–27	10,000	
October 23	3:00 p.m.	at Butler	Butler Bowl; Indianapolis, IN	W 16–7	12,000	
October 30		Kentucky*	Nippert Stadium; Cincinnati, OH	L 7–28	24,000	
November 5		at Miami (FL)*	Burdine Stadium; Miami, FL	L 6–36	31,561	
November 13		Western Reserve^{†}	Nippert Stadium; Cincinnati, OH	W 26–13		
November 20		Tulane*	Nippert Stadium; Cincinnati, OH	L 0–6	12,000	
November 25		Miami (OH)	Nippert Stadium; Cincinnati, OH (Victory Bell)	L 19–43	30,000	
*Non-conference game; ^{†}Homecoming; All times are in Eastern time
