= 1948 Ball State Cardinals football team =

American college football season

1948 Ball State Cardinals football
- Conference: Independent
- Record: 6–2
- Head coach: John Magnabosco (13th season)
- Home stadium: Ball State Field

1948 Midwestern non-major college football independents records
| | Conf. | | | Overall |
| Team | W | L | T | W | | L | | T |
|---|---|---|---|---|---|---|---|---|
| Michigan Tech | | – | | 7 | – | 0 | – | 0 |
| Bowling Green | | – | | 8 | – | 0 | – | 1 |
| Washington University | | – | | 9 | – | 1 | – | 0 |
| John Carroll | | – | | 7 | – | 1 | – | 2 |
| Ashland | | – | | 6 | – | 1 | – | 2 |
| Ball State | | – | | 6 | – | 2 | – | 0 |
| Dayton | | – | | 7 | – | 2 | – | 1 |
| Baldwin–Wallace | | – | | 5 | – | 2 | – | 2 |
| Indiana State | | – | | 4 | – | 4 | – | 0 |
| Wabash | | – | | 4 | – | 4 | – | 0 |
| Wayne | | – | | 4 | – | 4 | – | 0 |
| Valparaiso | | – | | 4 | – | 5 | – | 0 |
| Toledo | | – | | 5 | – | 6 | – | 0 |
| Michigan State Normal | | – | | 3 | – | 5 | – | 0 |
| Xavier | | – | | 4 | – | 6 | – | 0 |
| Central Michigan | | – | | 3 | – | 6 | – | 0 |

The 1948 Ball State Cardinals football team was an American football team that represented Ball State Teachers College (later renamed Ball State University) as an independent during the 1948 college football season. In their 13th season under head coach John Magnabosco, the Cardinals compiled a 6–2 record and outscored opponents by a total of 155 to 73.

== Schedule ==
| Date | Opponent | Site | Result | Attendance | Source |
|---|---|---|---|---|---|
| September 25 | at Saint Joseph's (IN) | Rensselaer, IN | L 0–33 | | |
| October 2 | at Eastern Illinois | Charleston, IL | L 0–12 | | |
| October 9 | Huntington | Ball State Field; Muncie, IN | W 53–0 | | |
| October 16 | Michigan State Normal^{†} | Ball State Field; Muncie, IN | W 23–14 | 6,000 | |
| October 20 | Anderson (IN) | Ball State Field; Muncie, IN | W 14–7 | | |
| October 30 | at Valparaiso | Valparaiso, IN | W 20–0 | | |
| November 6 | Manchester | Ball State Field; Muncie, IN | W 35–0 | 4,000 | |
| November 13 | at Indiana State | Memorial Stadium; Terre Haute, IN (Blue Key Victory Bell) | W 10–7 | 500 | |
^{†}Homecoming
