= 1948 Northern Illinois State Huskies football team =

American college football season

1948 Northern Illinois State Huskies football
- Conference: Illinois Intercollegiate Athletic Conference
- Record: 6–4 (2–2 IIAC)
- Head coach: Chick Evans (20th season)
- Captain: Robert Walker
- Home stadium: Glidden Field

1948 Illinois Intercollegiate Athletic Conference football standings
| | Conf. | | | | | Overall |
| Team | W | | L | | T | W | | L | | T |
|---|---|---|---|---|---|---|---|---|---|---|
| Eastern Illinois $ | 4 | – | 0 | – | 0 | 7 | – | 3 | – | 0 |
| Illinois State Normal | 3 | – | 1 | – | 0 | 7 | – | 2 | – | 0 |
| Northern Illinois State | 2 | – | 2 | – | 0 | 6 | – | 4 | – | 0 |
| Western Illinois | 1 | – | 3 | – | 0 | 4 | – | 4 | – | 0 |
| Southern Illinois | 0 | – | 4 | – | 0 | 2 | – | 6 | – | 0 |
$ – Conference champion

The 1948 Northern Illinois State Huskies football team represented Northern Illinois State Teachers College—now known as Northern Illinois University—as a member of the Illinois Intercollegiate Athletic Conference (IIAC) during the 1948 college football season. Led by 20th-year head coach Chick Evans, the Huskies compiled an overall record of 6–4 with a mark of 2–2 in conference play, placing third in the IIAC.

Northern Illinois was ranked at No. 243 in the final Litkenhous Difference by Score System ratings for 1948.

The team played home games at the 5,500-seat Glidden Field, located on the east end of campus, in DeKalb, Illinois.

== Schedule ==
| Date | Opponent | Site | Result | Attendance | Source |
|---|---|---|---|---|---|
| September 17 | Aurora Clippers* | Glidden Field; DeKalb, IL | W 25–12 | | |
| September 24 | at Washburn* | Moore Bowl; Topeka, KS | W 30–26 | | |
| October 1 | St. Ambrose* | Glidden Field; DeKalb, IL | L 13–16 | | |
| October 9 | Illinois State Normal^{†} | Glidden Field; DeKalb, IL | L 12–14 | 7,000 | |
| October 16 | at Eastern Illinois | Charleston, IL | L 6–15 | | |
| October 23 | Southern Illinois | Glidden Field; DeKalb, IL | W 25–7 | | |
| October 29 | at Michigan State Normal* | Ypsilanti, MI | W 10–7 | | |
| November 5 | at Western Illinois | Macomb, IL | W 18–0 | | |
| November 13 | Stevens Point State* | Glidden Field; DeKalb, IL | W 28–13 | | |
| November 19 | at Eastern Kentucky* | Hanger Field; Richmond KY | L 7–32 | | |
*Non-conference game; ^{†}Homecoming
