= 1948 Eastern Illinois Panthers football team =

American college football season

1948 Eastern Illinois Panthers football

IIAC champion

Corn Bowl, L 0–6 vs. Illinois Wesleyan
- Conference: Illinois Intercollegiate Athletic Conference
- Record: 7–3 (4–0 IIAC)
- Head coach: Maynard O'Brien (3rd season)

1948 Illinois Intercollegiate Athletic Conference football standings
| | Conf. | | | | | Overall |
| Team | W | | L | | T | W | | L | | T |
|---|---|---|---|---|---|---|---|---|---|---|
| Eastern Illinois $ | 4 | – | 0 | – | 0 | 7 | – | 3 | – | 0 |
| Illinois State Normal | 3 | – | 1 | – | 0 | 7 | – | 2 | – | 0 |
| Northern Illinois State | 2 | – | 2 | – | 0 | 6 | – | 4 | – | 0 |
| Western Illinois | 1 | – | 3 | – | 0 | 4 | – | 4 | – | 0 |
| Southern Illinois | 0 | – | 4 | – | 0 | 2 | – | 6 | – | 0 |
$ – Conference champion

The 1948 Eastern Illinois Panthers football team represented Eastern Illinois State College—now known as Eastern Illinois University—as a member of the Illinois Intercollegiate Athletic Conference (IIAC) during the 1948 college football season. Led by third-year head coach Maynard O'Brien, the Panthers finished the season with a 7–3 record overall and a 4–0 mark in conference play, winning the IIAC. They were invited to the postseason Corn Bowl, where they lost to Illinois Wesleyan, 6–0.

Eastern Illinois was ranked at No. 187 in the final Litkenhous Difference by Score System ratings for 1948.

== Schedule ==
| Date | Opponent | Site | Result | Attendance | Source |
|---|---|---|---|---|---|
| September 18 | St. Joseph's (IN)* | Charleston, IL | W 19–6 | | |
| September 24 | at Eastern Kentucky* | Richmond, KY | L 14–25 | | |
| October 2 | Ball State* | Charleston, IL | W 12–0 | | |
| October 9 | at Western Illinois | Morgan Field; Macomb, IL | W 7–0 | | |
| October 16 | Northern Illinois State | Charleston, IL | W 15–6 | | |
| October 23 | at Illinois State Normal | McCormick Field; Normal, IL (rivalry) | W 13–7 | 6,000 | |
| October 30 | Indiana State* | Charleston, IL | L 20–21 | | |
| November 6 | Millikin* | Charleston, IL | W 27–7 | | |
| November 13 | Southern Illinois | Charleston, IL | W 38–0 | | |
| November 25 | vs. Illinois Wesleyan* | Wesleyan Field; Bloomington, IL (Corn Bowl) | L 0–6 | 8,500 | |
*Non-conference game
