= 1948 John Carroll Blue Streaks football team =

American college football season

1948 John Carroll Blue Streaks football

Great Lakes Bowl, W 14–13 vs. Canisius
- Conference: Independent
- Record: 7–1–2
- Head coach: Herb Eisele (2nd season)

1948 Midwestern non-major college football independents records
	Conf.			Overall
Team	W	L	T	W		L		T
Michigan Tech		–		7	–	0	–	0
Bowling Green		–		8	–	0	–	1
Washington University		–		9	–	1	–	0
John Carroll		–		7	–	1	–	2
Ashland		–		6	–	1	–	2
Ball State		–		6	–	2	–	0
Dayton		–		7	–	2	–	1
Baldwin–Wallace		–		5	–	2	–	2
Indiana State		–		4	–	4	–	0
Wabash		–		4	–	4	–	0
Wayne		–		4	–	4	–	0
Valparaiso		–		4	–	5	–	0
Toledo		–		5	–	6	–	0
Michigan State Normal		–		3	–	5	–	0
Xavier		–		4	–	6	–	0
Central Michigan		–		3	–	6	–	0

The 1948 John Carroll Blue Streaks football team was an American football team that represented John Carroll University as an independent during the 1948 college football season. The team compiled a 7–1–2 record, including a victory over Canisius in the Great Lakes Bowl. Herb "Skeeter" Eisele was the team's head coach for the second year.

John Carroll was ranked at No. 86 in the final Litkenhous Difference by Score System ratings for 1948.

Sophomore Don Shula played at the halfback position. Shula later spent more than 40 years in the National Football League as a player and coach and was inducted into the Pro Football Hall of Fame. John Carroll's football stadium is named Don Shula Stadium in his honor.

== Schedule ==
Date	Opponent	Site	Result	Attendance	Source
September 24	Dayton	Municipal Stadium; Cleveland, OH	L 18–26	12,274	
October 2	at Toledo	Glass Bowl; Toledo, OH	W 46–20	10,000	
October 9	Youngstown	Cleveland, OH	W 13–6		
October 16	at Baldwin–Wallace	Berea, OH	T 19–19	9,000	
October 23	Niagara	Cleveland, OH	W 47–14	6,700	
October 29	Case Tech	Cleveland, OH	W 33–13		
November 6	at Marshall	Huntington, WV	W 20–6	8,000	
November 13	Xavier	Cleveland, OH	W 13–7	8,000	
November 20	at Bowling Green	Bowling Green, OH	T 13–13		
December 5	Canisius	Municipal Stadium; Cleveland, OH (Great Lakes Bowl)	W 14–13	17,964	
