= 1948 Butler Bulldogs football team =

American college football season

1948 Butler Bulldogs football
- Conference: Mid-American Conference
- Record: 3–5 (0–4 MAC)
- Head coach: Tony Hinkle (11th season)
- Home stadium: Butler Bowl

1948 Mid-American Conference football standings
	Conf.					Overall
Team	W		L		T	W		L		T
Miami (OH) $	4	–	0	–	0	7	–	1	–	1
Western Michigan	3	–	1	–	0	6	–	3	–	0
Cincinnati	3	–	1	–	0	3	–	6	–	1
Ohio	2	–	3	–	0	3	–	6	–	0
Western Reserve	1	–	4	–	0	1	–	8	–	1
Butler	0	–	4	–	0	3	–	5	–	0
$ – Conference champion

The 1948 Butler Bulldogs football team represented Butler University as a member of the Mid-American Conference (MAC) during the 1948 college football season. Led by 11th-year head coach Tony Hinkle, the Bulldogs compiled an overall record of 3–5 with a mark of 0–4 in conference play, placing last out of six teams in the MAC. Butler played home games at the Butler Bowl in Indianapolis.

== Schedule ==
Date	Time	Opponent	Site	Result	Attendance	Source
September 25		Indiana Central*	Butler Bowl; Indianapolis, IN	W 68–7	7,500	
October 2	2:00 p.m.	at Evansville*	Reitz Bowl; Evansville, IN	W 14–13	7,000	
October 9		at Western Reserve	League Park; Cleveland, OH	L 0–6		
October 16	2:00 p.m.	Washington University*^{†}	Butler Bowl; Indianapolis, IN	L 0–7	8,000	
October 23	2:00 p.m.	Cincinnati	Butler Bowl; Indianapolis, IN	L 7–16	12,000	
October 30		Wabash*	Butler Bowl; Indianapolis, IN	W 20–7	12,000	
November 6		at Western Michigan	Waldo Stadium; Kalamazoo, MI	L 7–20	8,000	
November 13	1:30 p.m.	Ohio	Butler Bowl; Indianapolis, IN	L 6–14	5,000	
*Non-conference game; ^{†}Homecoming; All times are in Central time
