= Herb Eisele =

American football coach and administrator (1904–1985)

Biographical details
- Born: July 15, 1904; Pennsylvania, U.S.
- Died: September 12, 1985 (aged 81); Ripon, Wisconsin, U.S.

Playing career
- 1922–1925: Dayton
- Position: End

Coaching career (HC unless noted)
- ?–1946: Cathedral Latin (OH)
- 1947–1958: John Carroll

Head coaching record
- Overall: 60–36–5 (college)
- Bowls: 1–0

Accomplishments and honors

Championships
- 1 PAC (1957)

Herbert Charles "Skeeter" Eisele (July 15, 1904 – September 12, 1985) was an American football coach and college athletics administrator. He served as the head football coach at John Carroll University in University Heights, Ohio from 1947 to 1958, compiling a record of 60–36–5.

During his time at John Carroll, he coached future Pro Football Hall of Fame coach Don Shula and future National Football League (NFL) player and assistant coach Carl Taseff.

Eisele was born on July 15, 1904, in Pennsylvania. He graduated from Cathedral Latin School in Cleveland, Ohio in 1922. He then attended the University of Dayton, where he played college football. Eisele later earned a master's degree from Western Reserve University. He died on September 12, 1985, at Ripon Memorial Hospital in Ripon, Wisconsin.

== Head coaching record ==
Year	Team	Overall	Conference	Standing	Bowl/playoffs
John Carroll Blue Streaks (Ohio Athletic Conference) (1947)
1947	John Carroll	6–3	5–1	4th	
John Carroll Blue Streaks (Independent) (1949–1954)
1948	John Carroll	7–1–2			W Great Lakes
1949	John Carroll	6–3			
1950	John Carroll	8–2			
1951	John Carroll	3–6			
1952	John Carroll	4–5			
1953	John Carroll	7–2			
1954	John Carroll	3–5			
John Carroll Blue Streaks (Presidents' Athletic Conference) (1955–1958)
1955	John Carroll	3–3–1	2–2–1	2nd	
1956	John Carroll	4–1–2	2–0–1	2nd	
1957	John Carroll	6–1	3–0	1st	
1958	John Carroll	3–4	3–4	5th	
John Carroll:		60–36–5	15–7–2		
Total:		60–36–5			
National championship Conference title Conference division title or championship game berth
