= 1948 Dayton Flyers football team =

American college football season

1948 Dayton Flyers football
- Conference: Independent
- Record: 7–2–1
- Head coach: Joe Gavin (2nd season)
- Home stadium: University of Dayton Stadium

1948 Midwestern non-major college football independents records
	Conf.			Overall
Team	W	L	T	W		L		T
Michigan Tech		–		7	–	0	–	0
Bowling Green		–		8	–	0	–	1
Washington University		–		9	–	1	–	0
John Carroll		–		7	–	1	–	2
Ashland		–		6	–	1	–	2
Ball State		–		6	–	2	–	0
Dayton		–		7	–	2	–	1
Baldwin–Wallace		–		5	–	2	–	2
Indiana State		–		4	–	4	–	0
Wabash		–		4	–	4	–	0
Wayne		–		4	–	4	–	0
Valparaiso		–		4	–	5	–	0
Toledo		–		5	–	6	–	0
Michigan State Normal		–		3	–	5	–	0
Xavier		–		4	–	6	–	0
Central Michigan		–		3	–	6	–	0

The 1948 Dayton Flyers football team was an American football team that represented the University of Dayton as an independent during the 1948 college football season. In their second season under head coach Joe Gavin, the Flyers compiled a 7–2–1 record.

Dayton was ranked at No. 71 in the final Litkenhous Difference by Score System ratings for 1948.

== Schedule ==
Date	Time	Opponent	Site	Result	Attendance	Source
September 24		at John Carroll	Municipal Stadium; Cleveland, OH	W 26–18	12,274	
October 3		at St. Bonaventure	Forness Stadium; Olean, NY	L 6–7	10,000	
October 9		Marshall	UD Stadium; Dayton, OH	W 33–0		
October 16		at Toledo	Glass Bowl; Toledo, OH	W 20–0		
October 24	2:15 p.m.	Saint Louis	UD Stadium; Dayton, OH	W 41–0	11,000	
October 31		at Xavier	Xavier Stadium; Cincinnati, OH	W 7–0	15,000	
November 6		Miami (OH)	UD Stadium; Dayton, OH	W 7–0	> 13,000	
November 13		Oklahoma City	UD Stadium; Dayton, OH	T 13–13		
November 20		Iowa State Teachers	UD Stadium; Dayton, OH	W 33–7		
November 25		at Chattanooga	Chamberlain Field; Chattanooga, TN	L 6–21		
All times are in Eastern time
