= Helmuth Naumer =

- Born: 1907; Reutlingen, Germany
- Died: 16 June 1990 (aged 82); Santa Fe, New Mexico, U.S.
- Education: Frank Wiggins Trade School; Otis Art Institute
- Known for: Painting

Helmuth Naumer Sr. (born 1907 in Reutlingen, Germany; died 16 June 1990) was an American artist. He painted subjects throughout the United States and around the world, but is best known for his works depicting landscapes of New Mexico.

== Early life and education ==
Naumer studied art in Germany and moved to the United States in 1926. He attended the Frank Wiggins Trade School and the Otis Art Institute in Los Angeles and then joined the Merchant Marine. After six years at sea, Naumer moved to Santa Fe, New Mexico in 1932. There, he began to work in pastels.

== Career ==
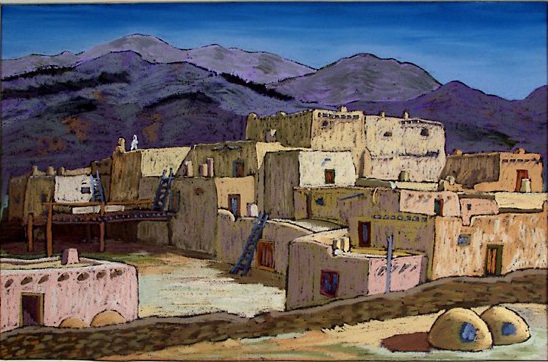
Taos Pueblo (1935-36)

In 1933, during the Great Depression, the Civilian Conservation Corps constructed various park buildings in Frijoles Canyon in Bandelier National Monument including a visitor centre as part of the federal Works Progress Administration's employment program. Naumer together with Pablita Velarde and E. J. Austin were commissioned by the National Park Service to create works for the newly built visitor centre exhibits. Naumer created a series of paintings showing scenes in Bandelier National Monument and nearby pueblos. He produced fourteen pastel artworks from 1935 to 1936 for Bandelier National Monument, works of art which remain in the Bandelier museum collections.

In the 1940s, Naumer settled on an artists' community called San Sebastian Ranch in the Santa Fe area on land purchased by Harper Henry from the painter Fremont Ellis. Other artists included Tom Lea, Pansy Stockton. The actress Greer Garson, who had a home nearby in Pecos, bought many of Naumer's pastels.

Although Naumer also worked in oils and watercolors, pastels were his preferred medium. He believed they allowed him to capture "the fleeting effects of the sky and water and our own New Mexico landscapes with fast changing colors sweeping rapidly across it, for there are hundreds of different colors and shades, so one loses no time in mixing colors as in oil."

Naumer's pastels often use a dark background, which give the drawings an appearance of glowing, bringing out the vivid colors of the local landscapes and sky.

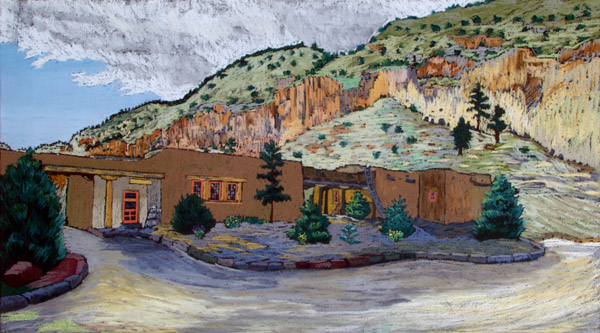
Administration Building, Frijoles Canyon (1935-36)

Naumer was a professional artist recognized as one of the major painters of the Santa Fe school. Describing his work in a 1959 pamphlet, he said "though born in Europe and having lived in many places in the world, coming to the Southwest was like coming home. Here I found peace and beauty and these I try to paint." His work is held in such museums as the New Mexico Museum of Art and the Panhandle-Plains Historical Museum.

In 1983, Naumer lent various papers for microfilming as part of the Archives of American Art's Texas project.

== Personal life ==
He died of cancer on 16 June 1990 in Santa Fe, New Mexico. Naumer's daughter, Carola Naumer, is professor of art history at Truckee Meadows Community College. Naumer's son served as the cultural affairs director of the New Mexico Department of Cultural Affairs from 1987 to 1994.

== Legacy ==
On June 2, 2016, Naumer was honored by the United States Postal Service when his painting "Administration Building, Frijoles Canyon" at Bandelier National Monument was used as a "Forever" Postage Stamp. The stamp appears in a commemorative collectible panel of 16 stamps representing various National Parks for the 100th anniversary of the National Park Service. A first day issuance ceremony was held in New York City at the World Stamp Show that day and another public ceremony was held at Bandelier National Monument in New Mexico with Naumer family members in attendance.

The Gerald Peters Art Gallery in Santa Fe, New Mexico represents the Naumer family with many selections of Helmuth Naumer's artwork.
