= Harold E. Wise =

American football coach (1903–1969)

Harold Wise
Biographical details
- Born: 1903
- Died: February 27, 1969 (aged 65); Columbus, Ohio, U.S.
- Education: Ohio (1928)

Playing career

Football
- c. 1925: Ohio

Basketball
- c. 1925: Ohio

Baseball
- c. 1925: Ohio

Coaching career (HC unless noted)

Football
- ?: Ashtabula HS (OH)
- 1929–1937: Columbus West HS (OH)
- 1938–1942: Ohio (assistant)
- 1947–1948: Ohio

Head coaching record
- Overall: 6–11–1 (college football)

Harold E. Wise (1903 – February 27, 1969) was an American football coach. He served as the head football coach at Ohio University in Athens, Ohio from 1947 to 1948, compiling a record of 6–11–1.

Wise was a 1928 graduate of Ohio University and was an associate director of the school's alumni board. A native of Wheeling, West Virginia, Wise later worked for Columbia Gas of Ohio. He died on February 27, 1969, at his home in Columbus, Ohio.

== Head coaching record ==
=== College football ===
| Year | Team | Overall | Conference | Standing | Bowl/playoffs |
|---|---|---|---|---|---|
Ohio Bobcats (Mid-American Conference) (1947–1948)
| 1947 | Ohio | 3–5–1 | 1–3 | T–3rd | |
| 1948 | Ohio | 3–6 | 2–3 | 4th | |
| Ohio: | | 6–11–1 | 3–6 | | |
| Total: | | 6–11–1 | | | |
