= 1948 Washington University Bears football team =

American college football season

1948 Washington University Bears football
- Conference: Independent
- Record: 9–1
- Head coach: Weeb Ewbank (2nd season)
- Home stadium: Francis Field

1948 Midwestern non-major college football independents records
	Conf.			Overall
Team	W	L	T	W		L		T
Michigan Tech		–		7	–	0	–	0
Bowling Green		–		8	–	0	–	1
Washington University		–		9	–	1	–	0
John Carroll		–		7	–	1	–	2
Ashland		–		6	–	1	–	2
Ball State		–		6	–	2	–	0
Dayton		–		7	–	2	–	1
Baldwin–Wallace		–		5	–	2	–	2
Indiana State		–		4	–	4	–	0
Wabash		–		4	–	4	–	0
Wayne		–		4	–	4	–	0
Valparaiso		–		4	–	5	–	0
Toledo		–		5	–	6	–	0
Michigan State Normal		–		3	–	5	–	0
Xavier		–		4	–	6	–	0
Central Michigan		–		3	–	6	–	0

The 1948 Washington University Bears football team represented Washington University in St. Louis as an independent during the 1948 college football season. Led by Weeb Ewbank in his second and final season as head coach, the Bears compiled a record of 9–1. Washington University played home games at Francis Field in St. Louis.

== Schedule ==
Date	Time	Opponent	Site	Result	Attendance	Source
September 25	2:00 p.m.	Missouri Mines	Francis Field; St. Louis, MO	W 19–7	9,100	
October 2	2:00 p.m.	Carnegie Tech	Francis Field; St. Louis, MO	W 14–6	6,800	
October 9	2:00 p.m.	Washburn	Francis Field; St. Louis, MO	W 20–0	5,600	
October 16	2:00 p.m.	at Butler	Butler Bowl; Indianapolis, IN	W 7–0	8,000	
October 23		at Colorado College	Washburn Field; Colorado Springs, CO	W 40–7	2,000	
October 30	2:00 p.m.	Oberlin	Francis Field; St. Louis, MO	W 33–20	4,200	
November 6	2:00 p.m.	at Grinnell	Grinnell, IA	W 47–0	2,000	
November 13	2:00 p.m.	Western Michigan^{†}	Francis Field; St. Louis, MO	L 6–19	10,250	
November 20	2:00 p.m.	at Sewanee	Hardee Field; Sewanee, TN	W 27–6		
November 27	2:00 p.m.	Louisville	Francis Field; St. Louis, MO	W 27–12	5,400	
^{†}Homecoming; All times are in Central time
