= 1948 Michigan State Normal Hurons football team =

American college football season

1948 Michigan State Normal Hurons football
- Conference: Independent
- Record: 3–5
- Head coach: Elton Rynearson (26th season)
- Captain: Claire E. Ebersole
- Home stadium: Briggs Field

1948 Midwestern non-major college football independents records
	Conf.			Overall
Team	W	L	T	W		L		T
Michigan Tech		–		7	–	0	–	0
Bowling Green		–		8	–	0	–	1
Washington University		–		9	–	1	–	0
John Carroll		–		7	–	1	–	2
Ashland		–		6	–	1	–	2
Ball State		–		6	–	2	–	0
Dayton		–		7	–	2	–	1
Baldwin–Wallace		–		5	–	2	–	2
Indiana State		–		4	–	4	–	0
Wabash		–		4	–	4	–	0
Wayne		–		4	–	4	–	0
Valparaiso		–		4	–	5	–	0
Toledo		–		5	–	6	–	0
Michigan State Normal		–		3	–	5	–	0
Xavier		–		4	–	6	–	0
Central Michigan		–		3	–	6	–	0

The 1948 Michigan State Normal Hurons football team represented Michigan State Normal College (later renamed Eastern Michigan University) as an independent during the 1948 college football season. In their 26th and final season under head coach Elton Rynearson, the Hurons compiled a 3–5 record and were outscored by their opponents, 114 to 66. Claire E. Ebersole was the team captain.

Rynearson retired as head football coach after the 1948 season after 26 years in that position. He remained the school's athletic director. In his 26 years as head football coach, Rynearson compiled a record of 114–58–15 (.648), and his teams outscored their opponents, 2,574 to 1,415.

== Schedule ==
Date	Opponent	Site	Result	Attendance	Source
September 24	at Hope	Holland, MI	L 0–14		
October 2	at Illinois State Normal	McCormick Field; Normal, IL	L 7–40		
October 9	Northern Michigan	Briggs Field; Ypsilanti, MI	W 6–0		
October 16	at Ball State	Muncie, IN	L 14–23	6,000	
October 23	at Eastern Kentucky	Richmond, KY	L 0–20		
October 29	Northern Illinois State	Briggs Field; Ypsilanti, MI	L 7–10		
November 6	Central Michigan ^{†}	Briggs Field; Ypsilanti, MI (rivalry)	W 6–0		
November 12	Valparaiso	Briggs Field; Ypsilanti, MI	W 26–7		
^{†}Homecoming
