= 1948 St. Bonaventure Bonnies football team =

American college football season

1948 St. Bonaventure Bonnies football
- Conference: Western New York Little Three Conference
- Record: 7–1–1 (1–1 Little Three)
- Head coach: Hugh Devore (3rd season)
- Home stadium: Forness Stadium

The 1948 St. Bonaventure Bonnies football team, sometimes also referred to as the St. Bonaventure Brown Indians, was an American football team that represented St. Bonaventure University during the 1948 college football season. In its third season under head coach Hugh Devore, the team compiled a 7–1–1 record and outscored opponents by a total of 130 to 59.

St. Bonaventure was ranked at No. 76 in the final Litkenhous Difference by Score System ratings for 1948.

The team played its home games at Forness Stadium in Olean, New York.

== Schedule ==
Date	Time	Opponent	Site	Result	Attendance	Source
October 3		Dayton*	Forness Stadium; Olean, NY	W 7–6	10,000	
October 9		at Boston College*	Braves Field; Boston, MA	T 7–7	16,000	
October 16		at Wayne*	University of Detroit Stadium; Detroit, MI	W 13–0	9,000	
October 23		William & Mary*	Forness Stadium; Olean, NY	W 7–6	11,500	
October 30	9:15 p.m.	at Saint Louis*	Edward J. Walsh Memorial Stadium; St. Louis, MO	W 21–0	6,193	
November 7		at Canisius	Civic Stadium; Buffalo, NY	L 6–14	32,000	
November 14		at Niagara	Buffalo, NY	W 21–0		
November 21		at Saint Vincent*	Latrobe, PA	W 28–12	11,000	
November 25		San Francisco*	Forness Stadium; Olean, NY	W 20–14	9,000	
*Non-conference game; All times are in Eastern time
