= 1948 Western Reserve Red Cats football team =

American college football season

1948 Western Reserve Red Cats football
- Conference: Mid-American Conference
- Record: 1–8–1 (1–4 MAC)
- Head coach: Mike Scarry (1st season)
- Home stadium: League Park

1948 Mid-American Conference football standings
	Conf.					Overall
Team	W		L		T	W		L		T
Miami (OH) $	4	–	0	–	0	7	–	1	–	1
Western Michigan	3	–	1	–	0	6	–	3	–	0
Cincinnati	3	–	1	–	0	3	–	6	–	1
Ohio	2	–	3	–	0	3	–	6	–	0
Western Reserve	1	–	4	–	0	1	–	8	–	1
Butler	0	–	4	–	0	3	–	5	–	0
$ – Conference champion

The 1948 Western Reserve Red Cats football team represented the Western Reserve University in the American city of Cleveland, Ohio, now known as Case Western Reserve University, during the 1948 college football season. The Red Cats were a member of the Mid-American Conference (MAC).

The team was coached by Mike Scarry, a former Cleveland Browns player who played under and learned his coaching style from Paul Brown. Assistant coaches were Dick Luther and Lou Zontini.

On October 23, Western Reserve battled Kent State to a 14–14 tie, which was broadcast on television in the Cleveland-Akron area, making it Ohio’s first intercollegiate televised football game.

Western Reserve lost to rival Case Tech for the first time since 1927, ending a 17-game Red Cats win streak.

Western Reserve was ranked at No. 220 in the final Litkenhous Difference by Score System ratings for 1948.

== Schedule ==
Date	Opponent	Site	Result	Attendance	Source
September 25	at Western Michigan	Waldo Stadium; Kalamazoo, MI	L 0–26		
October 2	Miami (OH)	League Park; Cleveland, OH	L 0–49		
October 9	Butler	League Park; Cleveland, OH	W 6–0		
October 16	at Ohio	Peden Stadium; Athens, OH	L 7–37		
October 23	Kent State*	League Park; Cleveland, OH	T 14–14		
October 30	Pittsburgh*	League Park; Cleveland, OH	L 0–20	12,000	
November 6	at Brown*	Brown Stadium; Providence, RI	L 0–36		
November 13	at Cincinnati	Nippert Stadium; Cincinnati, OH	L 13–26		
November 20	at West Virginia*	Mountaineer Field; Morgantown, WV	L 0–20	10,000	
November 25	Case Tech*	League Park; Cleveland, OH	L 7–15	14,000	
*Non-conference game
