= 1948 Central Michigan Chippewas football team =

American college football season

1948 Central Michigan Chippewas football
- Conference: Independent
- Record: 3–6
- Head coach: Lyle Bennett (2nd season)
- Home stadium: Alumni Field

1948 Midwestern non-major college football independents records
	Conf.			Overall
Team	W	L	T	W		L		T
Michigan Tech		–		7	–	0	–	0
Bowling Green		–		8	–	0	–	1
Washington University		–		9	–	1	–	0
John Carroll		–		7	–	1	–	2
Ashland		–		6	–	1	–	2
Ball State		–		6	–	2	–	0
Dayton		–		7	–	2	–	1
Baldwin–Wallace		–		5	–	2	–	2
Indiana State		–		4	–	4	–	0
Wabash		–		4	–	4	–	0
Wayne		–		4	–	4	–	0
Valparaiso		–		4	–	5	–	0
Toledo		–		5	–	6	–	0
Michigan State Normal		–		3	–	5	–	0
Xavier		–		4	–	6	–	0
Central Michigan		–		3	–	6	–	0

The 1948 Central Michigan Chippewas football team represented Central Michigan College of Education, later renamed Central Michigan University, as an independent during the 1948 college football season. In their second season under head coach Lyle Bennett, the Chippewas compiled a 3–6 record and were outscored by their opponents by a combined total of 139 to 127.

Art Teixera ranked first in the country with an average of 44.5 yards on 42 punts. Isham Williams passed for 576 yards.

== Schedule ==
Date	Opponent	Site	Result	Attendance	Source
September 21	Ferris Institute	Alumni Field; Mount Pleasant, MI	W 27–6		
October 2	at Bowling Green	Bowling Green, OH	L 12–13		
October 9	at Western Michigan	Waldo Stadium; Kalamazoo, MI (rivalry)	L 0–7		
October 14	Northern Michigan	Marquette, MI	W 46–14		
October 16	Kent State	Alumni Field; Mount Pleasant, MI	L 0–28		
October 23	Youngstown	Youngstown, OH	L 9–32		
October 30	Wayne^{†}	Alumni Field; Mount Pleasant, MI	L 12–27		
November 6	at Michigan State Normal	Briggs Field; Ypsilanti, MI (rivalry)	L 0–6	4,000	
November 13	Milwaukee State	Alumni Field; Mount Pleasant, MI	W 21–6		
^{†}Homecoming
