= 1948 Canisius Golden Griffins football team =

American college football season

1948 Canisius Golden Griffins football

Little Three champion

Great Lakes Bowl, L 13–14 vs. John Carroll
- Conference: Western New York Little Three Conference
- Record: 7–2–1 (2–0 Little Three)
- Head coach: James B. Wilson (5th season)
- Home stadium: Civic Stadium

The 1948 Canisius Golden Griffins football team was an American football team that represented Canisius College in the Western New York Little Three Conference (Little Three) during the 1948 college football season. Canisius compiled a 7–2–1 record, won the Little Three championship, lost to John Carroll in the Great Lakes Bowl, and outscored all opponents by a total of 242 to 109.

Canisius was ranked at No. 91 in the final Litkenhous Difference by Score System ratings for 1948.

James B. Wilson was hired in March 1948 as the team's head football coach. He had previously served as the school's head football coach from 1939 until 1942 when the school discontinued football for the duration of World War II.

Three Canisius players were selected by the United Press as first-team players on the All-Upstate New York football team: tackle George Eberle; guard George Kuhrt; and halfback Howie Willis.

== Schedule ==
| Date | Opponent | Site | Result | Attendance | Source |
|---|---|---|---|---|---|
| September 19 | Saint Francis (PA)* | Civic Stadium; Buffalo, NY | W 61–0 | 9,098 | |
| September 25 | at Youngstown* | Youngstown, OH | L 21–33 | 14,000 | |
| October 3 | at Saint Vincent* | Bearcat Stadium; Latrobe, PA | W 19–0 | 5,000 | |
| October 9 | Fordham* | Civic Stadium; Buffalo, NY | W 30–21 | 5,000 | |
| October 19 | Niagara | Civic Stadium; Buffalo, NY | W 19–0 | 6,274 | |
| October 24 | Scranton* | Civic Stadium; Buffalo, NY | W 32–7 | | |
| November 7 | St. Bonaventure | Civic Stadium; Buffalo, NY | W 14–6 | 32,451 | |
| November 13 | at Toledo* | Glass Bowl; Toledo, OH | W 26–21 | | |
| November 25 | at Marshall* | Fairfield Stadium; Huntington, WV | T 7–7 | 7,500 | |
| December 5 | at John Carroll* | Municipal Stadium; Cleveland, OH (Great Lakes Bowl) | L 13–14 | 17,964 | |
*Non-conference game
