= 1948 Xavier Musketeers football team =

American college football season

1948 Xavier Musketeers football
- Conference: Independent
- Record: 4–6
- Head coach: Ed Kluska (2nd season)
- Home stadium: Xavier Stadium

1948 Midwestern non-major college football independents records
	Conf.			Overall
Team	W	L	T	W		L		T
Michigan Tech		–		7	–	0	–	0
Bowling Green		–		8	–	0	–	1
Washington University		–		9	–	1	–	0
John Carroll		–		7	–	1	–	2
Ashland		–		6	–	1	–	2
Ball State		–		6	–	2	–	0
Dayton		–		7	–	2	–	1
Baldwin–Wallace		–		5	–	2	–	2
Indiana State		–		4	–	4	–	0
Wabash		–		4	–	4	–	0
Wayne		–		4	–	4	–	0
Valparaiso		–		4	–	5	–	0
Toledo		–		5	–	6	–	0
Michigan State Normal		–		3	–	5	–	0
Xavier		–		4	–	6	–	0
Central Michigan		–		3	–	6	–	0

The 1948 Xavier Musketeers football team was an American football team that represented Xavier University as an independent during the 1948 college football season. In their second year under head coach Ed Kluska, the Musketeers compiled a 4–6 record.

== Schedule ==
Date	Opponent	Site	Result	Attendance	Source
September 18	Eastern Kentucky	Xavier Stadium; Cincinnati, OH	W 31–0		
September 25	at Kentucky	McLean Stadium; Lexington, KY	L 7–48		
October 2	at Cincinnati	Nippert Stadium; Cincinnati, OH (rivalry)	W 13–7	28,000	
October 8	Louisville	Xavier Stadium; Cincinnati, OH	W 47–26	8,000	
October 16	at Miami (OH)	Miami Field; Oxford, OH	L 0–9	13,000	
October 23	at Western Michigan	Waldo Stadium; Kalamazoo, MI	W 33–20	5,500	
October 31	Dayton	Xavier Stadium; Cincinnati, OH	L 0–7	15,000	
November 6	Quantico Marines	Xavier Stadium; Cincinnati, OH	L 51–26	8,000	
November 13	at John Carroll	Shaw Stadium; East Cleveland, OH	L 7–13	8,500	
November 20	Marshall	Xavier Stadium; Cincinnati, OH	L 20–26	7,500	
