= 1948 Illinois State Normal Redbirds football team =

American college football season

1948 Illinois State Normal Redbirds football
- Conference: Illinois Intercollegiate Athletic Conference
- Record: 7–2 (3–1 IIAC)
- Head coach: Edwin Struck (4th season)
- MVP: John Dal Santo
- Captain: Bill Brady
- Home stadium: McCormick Field

1948 Illinois Intercollegiate Athletic Conference football standings
	Conf.					Overall
Team	W		L		T	W		L		T
Eastern Illinois $	4	–	0	–	0	7	–	3	–	0
Illinois State Normal	3	–	1	–	0	7	–	2	–	0
Northern Illinois State	2	–	2	–	0	6	–	4	–	0
Western Illinois	1	–	3	–	0	4	–	4	–	0
Southern Illinois	0	–	4	–	0	2	–	6	–	0
$ – Conference champion

The 1948 Illinois State Normal Redbirds football team represented Illinois State Normal University—now known as Illinois State University—as a member of the Illinois Intercollegiate Athletic Conference (IIAC) during the 1948 college football season. The team was led by fourth-year head coach Edwin Struck and played its home games at McCormick Field. The Redbirds finished the season with a 7–2 overall record and a 3–1 record in conference play, placing second in the IIAC. Fullback John Dal Santo was named the team's most valuable player.

== Schedule ==
Date	Opponent	Site	Result	Attendance	Source
September 25	at Indiana State*	Terre Haute, IN	L 7–9		
October 2	Michigan State Normal*	McCormick Field; Normal, IL	W 40–7		
October 9	at Northern Illinois State	Glidden Field; DeKalb, IL	W 14–12	7,000	
October 16	at Valparaiso*	Brown Field; Valparaiso, IN	W 16–14		
October 23	Eastern Illinois^{†}	McCormick Field; Normal, IL (rivalry)	L 7–13	6,000	
October 30	St. Norbert*	McCormick Field; Normal, IL	W 16–14		
November 6	at Southern Illinois	McAndrew Stadium; Carbondale, IL	W 48–0		
November 13	Western Illinois	McCormick Field; Normal, IL	W 40–0		
November 20	Illinois Wesleyan*	McCormick Field; Normal, IL	W 32–6		
*Non-conference game; ^{†}Homecoming
