= 1948 Western Michigan Broncos football team =

American college football season

1948 Western Michigan Broncos football
- Conference: Mid-American Conference
- Record: 6–3 (3–1 MAC)
- Head coach: John Gill (7th season)
- MVP: Hilton Foster
- Captains: Art Gillespie; Emerson Grossman
- Home stadium: Waldo Stadium

1948 Mid-American Conference football standings
	Conf.					Overall
Team	W		L		T	W		L		T
Miami (OH) $	4	–	0	–	0	7	–	1	–	1
Western Michigan	3	–	1	–	0	6	–	3	–	0
Cincinnati	3	–	1	–	0	3	–	6	–	1
Ohio	2	–	3	–	0	3	–	6	–	0
Western Reserve	1	–	4	–	0	1	–	8	–	1
Butler	0	–	4	–	0	3	–	5	–	0
$ – Conference champion

The 1948 Western Michigan Broncos football team represented Michigan College of Education (later renamed Western Michigan University) in the Mid-American Conference (MAC) during the 1948 college football season. In their seventh season under head coach John Gill, the Broncos compiled a 6–3 record (3–1 against MAC opponents), finished in second place in the MAC, and outscored their opponents, 199 to 106. The team played its home games at Waldo Stadium in Kalamazoo, Michigan.

Fullback Art Gillespie and guard Emerson Grossman were the team captains. Quarterback Hilton Foster received the team's most outstanding player award.

Western Michigan was ranked at No. 105 in the final Litkenhous Difference by Score System ratings for 1948.

== Schedule ==
Date	Time	Opponent	Site	Result	Attendance	Source
September 25		Western Reserve	Waldo Stadium; Kalamazoo, MI	W 26–0		
October 2		at Beloit*	Beloit, WI	W 33–0		
October 9		Central Michigan*	Waldo Stadium; Kalamazoo, MI (rivalry)	W 7–0		
October 16		at Iowa State Teachers*	O. R. Latham Field; Cedar Falls, IA	L 6–13	5,500	
October 23		Xavier*	Waldo Stadium; Kalamazoo, MI	L 20–39	5,500	
October 30		at Miami (OH)	Miami Field; Oxford, OH	L 28–34	12,252	
November 6		Butler^{†}	Waldo Stadium; Kalamazoo, MI	W 20–7	8,000	
November 13	3:00 p.m.	at Washington University*	Francis Field; St. Louis, MO	W 19–6	10,250	
November 20		at Ohio	Peden Stadium; Athens, OH	W 40–7		
*Non-conference game; ^{†}Homecoming; All times are in Eastern time
