= 1948 Miami Redskins football team =

American college football season

1948 Miami Redskins football

MAC champion
- Conference: Mid-American Conference
- Record: 7–1–1 (4–0 MAC)
- Head coach: George Blackburn (1st season)
- Captain: Paul Shoults
- Home stadium: Miami Field

1948 Mid-American Conference football standings
	Conf.					Overall
Team	W		L		T	W		L		T
Miami (OH) $	4	–	0	–	0	7	–	1	–	1
Western Michigan	3	–	1	–	0	6	–	3	–	0
Cincinnati	3	–	1	–	0	3	–	6	–	1
Ohio	2	–	3	–	0	3	–	6	–	0
Western Reserve	1	–	4	–	0	1	–	8	–	1
Butler	0	–	4	–	0	3	–	5	–	0
$ – Conference champion

The 1948 Miami Redskins football team was an American football team that represented Miami University in the Mid-American Conference (MAC) during the 1948 college football season. In its first and only season under head coach George Blackburn, Miami compiled a 7–1–1 record (4–0 against MAC opponents), won the MAC championship, and outscored all opponents by a combined total of 249 to 90.

Paul Shoults was the team captain. The team's statistical leaders included Paul Shoults with 624 rushing yards, Mel Olix with 939 passing yards, and Hal Paul with 238 receiving yards.

Four Miami players received first-team honors on the 1948 All-Mid-American Conference football team selected by the Associated Press. They were backs Mel Olix and Paul Shoults, end Richard Urich, and tackle John Weaver. Four others received second-team honors: back Sam Wippel, end Harold Paul, and tackles Ernest Plant and William McCormick.

Miami was ranked at No. 57 in the final Litkenhous Difference by Score System ratings for 1948.

== Schedule ==
Date	Opponent	Site	Result	Attendance	Source
September 18	Marshall*	Miami Field; Oxford, OH	W 38–6	10,000	
September 25	at Virginia*	Scott Stadium; Charlottesville, VA	T 14–14	15,000	
October 2	at Western Reserve	League Park; Cleveland, OH	W 49–0		
October 16	Xavier*	Miami Field; Oxford, OH	W 9–0	> 13,000	
October 23	at Ohio	Peden Stadium; Athens, OH (rivalry)	W 21–0	12,000	
October 30	Western Michigan^{†}	Miami Field; Oxford, OH	W 34–28	12,252	
November 6	at Dayton*	UD Stadium; Dayton, OH	L 0–7	> 13,000	
November 13	Wichita*	Miami Field; Oxford, OH	W 41–16	9,000	
November 25	at Cincinnati*	Nippert Stadium; Cincinnati, OH (rivalry)	W 43–19	30,000	
*Non-conference game; ^{†}Homecoming
