= Lyle Bennett =

American football and track coach

Biographical details
- Born: June 23, 1903
- Died: March 24, 2005 (aged 101); Mount Pleasant, Michigan, U.S.

Playing career

Football
- 1925–1926: Central Michigan

Baseball
- 1926–1927: Central Michigan

Coaching career (HC unless noted)

Football
- 1947–1949: Central Michigan

Track
- 1947–1970: Central Michigan

Head coaching record
- Overall: 8–15–1 (football)

Lyle Bennett (June 23, 1903 – March 24, 2005) was an American football and track coach. He served as the head football coach at Central Michigan University program from 1947 to 1949, compiling a record of 8–15–1. Bennett was also the head track coach at Central Michigan from 1947 to 1970. He attended Central Michigan where he played football and baseball, and ran track. He also coached at Reed City High School, Rockford High School, and Hastings High School, all in Michigan. The outdoor track at Central Michigan University is named for Bennett.

== Head coaching record ==
=== Football ===
Year	Team	Overall	Conference	Standing	Bowl/playoffs
Central Michigan Chippewas (Independent) (1947–1949)
1947	Central Michigan	2–5–1			
1948	Central Michigan	3–6			
1949	Central Michigan	3–4			
Central Michigan:		8–15–1			
Total:		8–15–1			
