= 1948 Toledo Rockets football team =

American college football season

1948 Toledo Rockets football

Glass Bowl, W 27–14 vs. Oklahoma City
- Conference: Independent
- Record: 5–6
- Head coach: Skip Stahley (1st season)
- Captains: Mardo Hamilton; Mike Carman
- Home stadium: Glass Bowl

1948 Midwestern non-major college football independents records
	Conf.			Overall
Team	W	L	T	W		L		T
Michigan Tech		–		7	–	0	–	0
Bowling Green		–		8	–	0	–	1
Washington University		–		9	–	1	–	0
John Carroll		–		7	–	1	–	2
Ashland		–		6	–	1	–	2
Ball State		–		6	–	2	–	0
Dayton		–		7	–	2	–	1
Baldwin–Wallace		–		5	–	2	–	2
Indiana State		–		4	–	4	–	0
Wabash		–		4	–	4	–	0
Wayne		–		4	–	4	–	0
Valparaiso		–		4	–	5	–	0
Toledo		–		5	–	6	–	0
Michigan State Normal		–		3	–	5	–	0
Xavier		–		4	–	6	–	0
Central Michigan		–		3	–	6	–	0

The 1948 Toledo Rockets football team was an American football team that represented Toledo University during the 1948 college football season. In their first season under head coach Skip Stahley, the Rockets compiled a 5–6 record, were outscored by their opponents by a combined total of 225 to 206, and defeated Oklahoma City, 27–14, in the third postseason Glass Bowl game.

On October 2, 1948, Chuck Hardy set a Toledo school record that still stands with a 100-yard kickoff return against John Carroll. On October 9, 1948, the Rockets renewed the Bowling Green–Toledo football rivalry after a 13-year hiatus. Toledo lost to Bowling Green, 21-6, in the 1948 game. During the 1948 season, a Toledo football game was televised for the first time on WSPD-TV13 (later WTVG). The 1948 team captains were Mardo Hamilton and Mike Carman. Lee Pete earned most valuable player honors in the Glass Bowl contest after completing 22 of 27 passes for three touchdowns.

Toledo was ranked at No. 139 in the final Litkenhous Difference by Score System ratings for 1948.

== Schedule ==
Date	Opponent	Site	Result	Attendance	Source
September 18	Bates	Glass Bowl; Toledo, OH	W 42–0		
September 24	at Detroit	University of Detroit Stadium; Detroit, MI	L 0–36	20,741	
October 2	John Carroll	Glass Bowl; Toledo, OH	L 20–46		
October 9	Bowling Green	Glass Bowl; Toledo, OH (rivalry)	L 6–21		
October 16	Dayton	Glass Bowl; Toledo, OH	L 0–20		
October 23	at Springfield	Springfield, MA	W 21–14		
October 30	Baldwin–Wallace	Glass Bowl; Toledo, OH	L 14–20		
November 6	Wayne	Glass Bowl; Toledo, OH	W 27–14		
November 13	Canisius	Glass Bowl; Toledo, OH	L 21–26		
November 20	at New Hampshire	Lewis Field; Durham, NH	W 28–14		
December 4	Oklahoma City	Glass Bowl; Toledo, OH (Glass Bowl)	W 27–14		
