= Cerro Grande (New Mexico) =

Summit in New Mexico

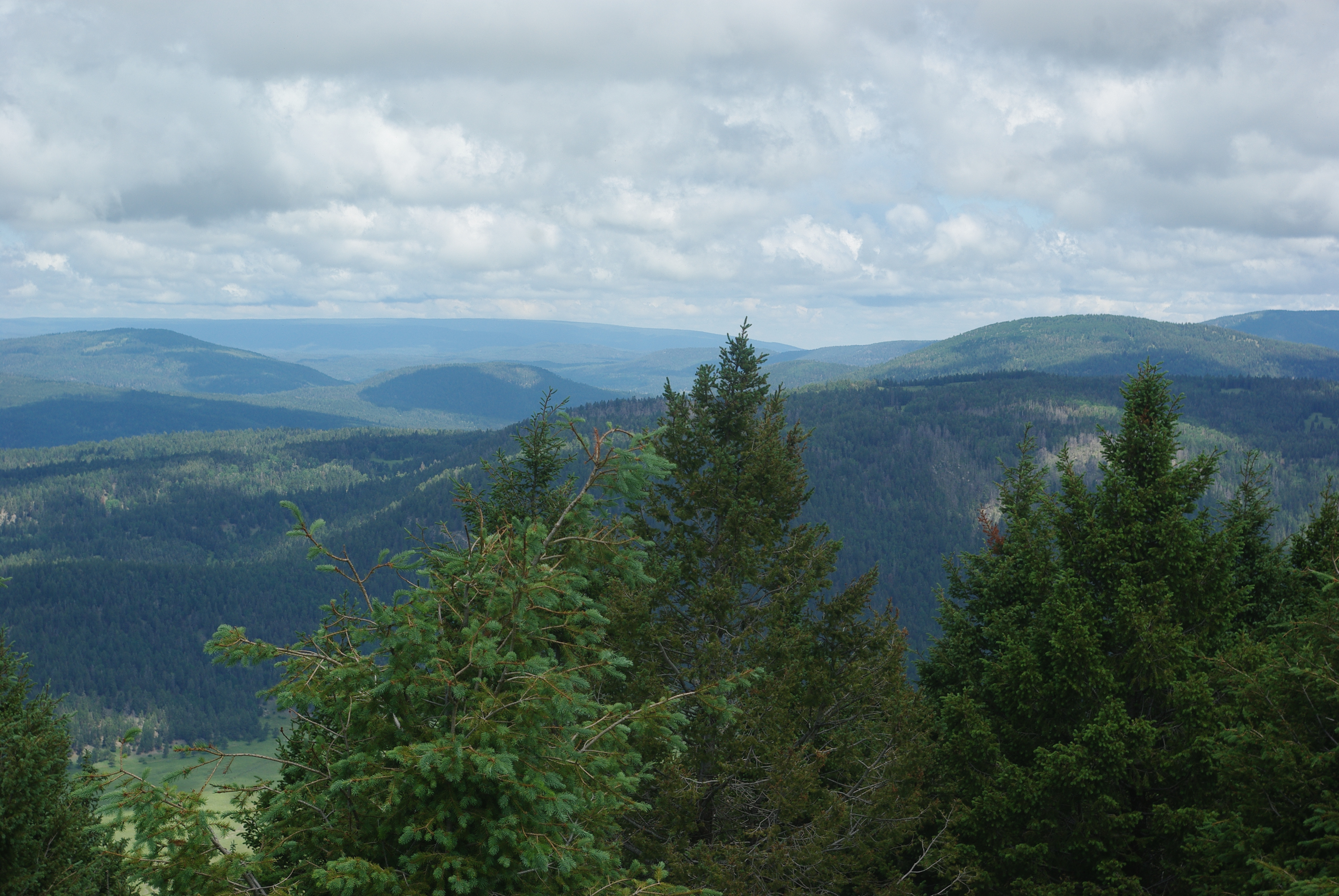
- View from the summit looking west toward the Valles Caldera (visible at lower left) before the Las Conchas Fire.

Highest point
- Elevation: 10,207 ft (3,111 m) NAVD 88
- Prominence: 660 ft (200 m)
- Coordinates: 35°52′10″N 106°24′46″W

Geography
- Location within New Mexico
- Location: Sandoval County, New Mexico
- Parent range: Jemez Mountains
- Topo map: Bland

Climbing
- Easiest route: Trail hike

Cerro Grande is a 10,207-foot (3,111 m) summit on the rim of the Valles Caldera not far north of New Mexico State Road 4, the main highway through Los Alamos County. Like many mountains in the Jemez, Cerro Grande was mainly covered with coniferous forest, composed largely of ponderosa pine and aspen trees, with a characteristic rincon (meadow) on its slopes on and south of the summit.

In May 2000, a prescribed burn on Cerro Grande got out of control and became the Cerro Grande Fire, a forest fire that burned 48,000 acres (190 km²) and destroyed hundreds of homes. Much of the forest on Cerro Grande itself was not damaged badly or at all. However, the whole mountain burned severely in the Las Conchas Fire of 2011.

The summit can be reached by a short hike [2.3 miles (3.7 km) each way, with an elevation change of 1,200 feet (370 m)] from a trailhead along State Road 4. From the summit, one can see into Valle Grande to the west and into upper Frijoles Canyon to the south.
