= Jim Cullivan =

American football player and coach (1921–2024)

Biographical details
- Born: June 10, 1921; Paris, Tennessee, U.S.
- Died: September 17, 2024 (aged 103); Paris, Tennessee, U.S.

Playing career
- 1942, 1946–1948: Murray State
- Position: Left guard

Coaching career (HC unless noted)
- 1949–1950: Fulton HS (KY) (assistant)
- 1951–1955: Murray State (assistant)
- 1956–1959: Murray State
- 1961–1963: Eastern Kentucky (DC)
- 1964–1965: Appalachian State (backfield)
- 1966–1968: Grove HS (TN) (HC/DC)
- 1969–1970: Henry County HS (TN)
- 1973–1977: North Stanley HS (NC)
- 1978: Guilford (DL)
- 1979: Cawood HS (KY) (assistant)
- 1980–1988: Cawood HS (KY)
- 1989–?: Tennessee Wesleyan (assistant)
- c. 1990: UPFL team

Head coaching record
- Overall: 12–26–1 (college)

Owen James Cullivan Jr. (June 10, 1921 – September 17, 2024) was an American football coach. He served as the head football coach at Murray State University from 1956 to 1959, compiling a record of 12–26–1, and had a coaching career that spanned over 40 years. He played college football for Murray State, and was on their 1948 championship team.

== Early life and education ==
Cullivan was born on June 10, 1921, and grew up in Paris, Tennessee. He attended Grove High School there, playing on their championship football team in 1940. In 1942, and from 1946 to 1948, he played college football for Murray State, and was left guard for their 1948 conference championship team. He missed seasons between 1943 and 1945 due to serving in the United States Army in World War II.

== Coaching career ==
After graduating college with a bachelor's and master's degree, Cullivan started a coaching career, being named assistant at Fulton High School in Kentucky in 1949. After two years there, he returned to his alma mater Murray State as an assistant coach. When head coach Fred Faurot resigned in 1956, Cullivan was named the replacement. He finished his first season as head with a 6–4 record, with three of the four losses coming by one point.

His team compiled a 3–5–1 record in 1957, a 3–7 record in 1958, and a winless 0–10 in the following, leading to his firing in January 1960.

After leaving Murray State, Cullivan took a year off from coaching to work on a doctorate from Indiana University Bloomington. In 1961, he was hired by Eastern Kentucky State College (now Eastern Kentucky University) as defensive coordinator. He resigned in 1964 to join Appalachian State University. He served as backfield coach for two years, and was associate professor of health and physical education.

After two seasons with Appalachian State, he was signed by Grove High School in 1966 as defensive coordinator and head coach. While there, he coached his three sons, Jim, Bill, and Pat. When the school closed in 1969, he moved to its successor, Henry County High School, where he served for the next two years as their first football coach.

He retired after 1970, and sat out the next two years. He returned in 1973 as coach of North Stanley High School in North Carolina, saying, "I sat out (of coaching) two years, but I got restless. Raising cattle didn't work out." He left after five years, returning to college coaching with the Guilford Quakers as defensive line coach in 1978. He moved back to the high school level in 1979, joining Cawood High School in Kentucky as an assistant. He was promoted to head coach in 1980, and posted a 65–21 football record in nine seasons. He helped them achieve two undefeated years and seven playoff berths. In 1985, he was awarded The Courier-Journal's annual Coach of the Year award.

Cullivan left the school in 1989 to become an assistant coach for Tennessee Wesleyan. After a stint with them, he had a short stay with a team in the United Professional Football League (UPFL) before retiring.

== Later life and death ==
Cullivan turned 100 on June 10, 2021, and died on September 17, 2024, at the age of 103.

== Head coaching record ==
=== College ===
Year	Team	Overall	Conference	Standing	Bowl/playoffs
Murray State Thoroughbreds (Ohio Valley Conference) (1956–1959)
1956	Murray State	6–4	4–1	2nd	
1957	Murray State	3–5–1	1–3–1	5th	
1958	Murray State	3–7	2–4	6th	
1959	Murray State	0–10	0–6	7th	
Murray State:		12–26–1	6–14–1		
Total:		12–26–1			
