= 1936 Kirksville Bulldogs football team =

College football season

1936 Kirksville Bulldogs football

MIAA champion
- Conference: Missouri Intercollegiate Athletic Association
- Record: 7–0 (4–0 MIAA)
- Head coach: Fred Faurot (9th season)
- Home stadium: Stokes Stadium

1936 Missouri Intercollegiate Athletic Association football standings
	Conf.					Overall
Team	W		L		T	W		L		T
Kirksville $	5	–	0	–	0	7	–	0	–	0
Warrensburg	4	–	1	–	0	6	–	2	–	0
Cape Girardeau	3	–	2	–	0	4	–	5	–	0
Maryville (MO)	1	–	3	–	1	4	–	4	–	1
Rolla	0	–	3	–	2	1	–	4	–	2
Springfield (MO)	0	–	4	–	1	1	–	5	–	2
$ – Conference champion

The 1936 Kirksville Bulldogs football team represented the Kirksville State Teachers College (also known as Northeast Missouri State Teachers College, later renamed as Truman State University) as a member of the Missouri Intercollegiate Athletic Association (MIAA) during the 1936 college football season. In their second year under head coach Fred Faurot, the Bulldogs compiled a 7–0 record (4–0 against conference opponents), won the MIAA championship, and outscored opponents by a total of 79 to 29. It was Kirksville's fifth consecutive MIAA championship. The team had not lost a game against an MIAA opponent since 1931.

Between 1933 and 1936, Kirksville lost only one game and had four perfect seasons in five years: 1932 (8–0), 1933 (9–0), 1934 (8–0), and 1936 (7–0).

The team played its home games at Stokes Stadium in Kirksville, Missouri.

== Schedule ==
Date	Opponent	Site	Result	Attendance	Source
October 2	Missouri "B" team	Stokes Stadium; Kirksville, MO	W 13–8	2,500	
October 9	at Pittsburg Teachers*	Pittsburg, KS	W 14–0	2,000	
October 16	Springfield (MO)^{†}	Stokes Stadium; Kirksville, MO	W 13–2	3,000	
October 23	at Cape Girardeau	Cape Girardeau, MO	W 6–0		
October 30	Rolla*	Stokes Stadium; Kirksville, MO	W 13–12		
November 6	Maryville (MO)	Stokes Stadium; Kirksville, MO	W 7–0		
November 13	at Warrensburg	Warrensburg, MO	W 13–7	4,000	
*Non-conference game; ^{†}Homecoming
