= 1948 Marshall Thundering Herd football team =

American college football season

1948 Marshall Thundering Herd football
- Conference: Ohio Valley Conference
- Record: 2–7–1 (1–2 OVC)
- Head coach: Cam Henderson (11th season)
- Captains: Claude Miller; Chuck Fieldson
- Home stadium: Fairfield Stadium

1948 Ohio Valley Conference football standings
	Conf.					Overall
Team	W		L		T	W		L		T
Murray State +	3	–	1	–	0	9	–	1	–	1
Evansville +	3	–	1	–	0	6	–	3	–	0
Eastern Kentucky	2	–	2	–	0	8	–	3	–	0
Louisville	1	–	1	–	0	5	–	5	–	0
Western Kentucky	2	–	3	–	0	5	–	4	–	0
Morehead State	0	–	3	–	0	3	–	5	–	0
+ – Conference co-champions

1948 Southern non-major college football independents records
	Conf.			Overall
Team	W	L	T	W		L		T
Maryland State		–		7	–	1	–	0
Sewanee		–		6	–	1	–	1
Grambling		–		8	–	2	–	0
East Tennessee State		–		6	–	2	–	1
Delaware		–		5	–	3	–	0
Memphis State		–		6	–	5	–	0
Tennessee Tech		–		5	–	6	–	0
Oklahoma City		–		4	–	5	–	1
Marshall		–		2	–	7	–	1
Tampa		–		2	–	6	–	0
Texas State		–		0	–	8	–	1
CCUNC		–		0	–	5	–	0

The 1948 Marshall Thundering Herd football team was an American football team that represented Marshall University in the Ohio Valley Conference (OVC) during the 1948 college football season. In its 11th season under head coach Cam Henderson, the team compiled a 2–7–1 record and was outscored by a total of 243 to 71. Claude Miller and Chuck Fieldson were the team captains.

Marshall was ranked at No. 176 in the final Litkenhous Difference by Score System ratings for 1948.

== Schedule ==
Date	Opponent	Site	Result	Attendance	Source
September 18	at Miami (OH)	Miami Field; Oxford, OH	L 6–38	10,000	
September 25	Morehead State	Fairfield Stadium; Huntington, WV	W 19–7		
October 2	Eastern Kentucky	Fairfield Stadium; Huntington, WV	L 7–20		
October 9	at Dayton	UD Stadium; Dayton, OH	L 0–33		
October 15	at Murray State	Murray, KY	L 0–27		
October 30	at Bradley	Peoria Stadium; Peoria, IL	L 6–15		
November 6	John Carroll^{†}	Fairfield Stadium; Huntington, WV	L 0–20		
November 13	at Vanderbilt	Dudley Field; Nashville, TN	L 0–56	16,000	
November 20	at Xavier	Xavier Stadium; Cincinnati, OH	W 26–20	7,500	
November 25	Canisius	Fairfield Stadium; Huntington, WV	T 7–7	7,500	
^{†}Homecoming
