= Tsoutsouvas =

Tsoutsouvas is a surname. Notable people with the surname include:

- Lou Tsoutsouvas (1915–2001), American football player and coach
- Sam Tsoutsouvas, American actor and lyricist
- Sam Tsoutsouvas (1917–1989), American football player
