= 1948 Delaware Fightin' Blue Hens football team =

American college football season

1948 Delaware Fightin' Blue Hens football
- Conference: Independent
- Record: 5–3
- Head coach: William D. Murray (6th season)
- Captains: Robert Campbell; Eugene Carrell
- Home stadium: Wilmington Park

1948 Southern non-major college football independents records
	Conf.			Overall
Team	W	L	T	W		L		T
Maryland State		–		7	–	1	–	0
Sewanee		–		6	–	1	–	1
Grambling		–		8	–	2	–	0
East Tennessee State		–		6	–	2	–	1
Delaware		–		5	–	3	–	0
Memphis State		–		6	–	5	–	0
Tennessee Tech		–		5	–	6	–	0
Oklahoma City		–		4	–	5	–	1
Marshall		–		2	–	7	–	1
Tampa		–		2	–	6	–	0
Texas State		–		0	–	8	–	1
CCUNC		–		0	–	5	–	0

The 1948 Delaware Fightin' Blue Hens football team was an American football team that represented the University of Delaware as an independent during the 1948 college football season. In its sixth season under head coach William D. Murray, the team compiled a 5–3 record and outscored opponents by a total of 107 to 95. Robert Campbell and Eugene Carrell were the team captains.

Delaware was ranked at No. 143 in the final Litkenhous Difference by Score System ratings for 1948.

The team played its home games at Wilmington Park in Wilmington, Delaware.

== Schedule ==
Date	Opponent	Site	Result	Attendance	Source
September 25	Pennsylvania Military	Wilmington Park; Wilmington, DE	L 7–13	13,000	
October 2	Maryland	Wilmington Park; Wilmington, DE	L 0–21	14,000	
October 9	West Chester	Wilmington Park; Wilmington, DE (rivalry)	W 19–0	9,500	
October 15	Bucknell	Wilmington Park; Wilmington, DE	W 7–0	8,500	
October 30	Muhlenberg	Wilmington Park; Wilmington, DE	W 13–0	8,100	
November 6	at Gettysburg	Musselman Stadium; Gettysburg, PA	W 33–27	3,000	
November 13	at Rollins	Greater Orlando Stadium; Orlando, FL	W 14–13		
November 20	Washington and Lee	Wilmington Park; Wilmington, DE	L 14–21	7,500	
