= Dick Boyle (American football) =

American football player and coach

Playing career

Football
- 1929–1930: Saint Mary's
- Position: Halfback

Coaching career (HC unless noted)

Football
- 1939–1941: San Francisco State
- 1946–1949: San Francisco State

Baseball
- 1950–1958: San Francisco State

Head coaching record
- Overall: 18–30–4 (football)
- Bowls: 0–1

Accomplishments and honors

Awards
- Third-team All-American (1929)

Richard Boyle was an American football player and coach. He served as the head football coach (1939–1941, 1946–1949) and head baseball coach (1950–1958) at San Francisco State University.

Boyle played college football at Saint Mary's College of California, where he was instrumental in the 1930 Saint Mary's Gaels football team's upset of Eastern powerhouse Fordham.

== Head coaching record ==
=== Football ===
Year	Team	Overall	Conference	Standing	Bowl/playoffs
San Francisco State Staters/Gaters (Independent) (1939–1941)
1939	San Francisco State	2–4–2			
1940	San Francisco State	3–5			
1941	San Francisco State	2–4–1			
San Francisco State Gators (Far Western Conference) (1946–1949)
1946	San Francisco State	3–3	0–0	NA	
1947	San Francisco State	2–5	1–3	T–4th	
1948	San Francisco State	3–5	2–2	3rd	L Fruit
1949	San Francisco State	3–4–1	1–2–1	T–3rd	
San Francisco State:		18–30–4	4–7–1		
Total:					
