= 1955 Texas A&I Javelinas football team =

American college football season

1955 Texas A&I Javelinas football
- Conference: Lone Star Conference
- Record: 4–6 (2–4 LSC)
- Head coach: Gil Steinke (2nd season)
- Captains: Steve Curry; Johnny McCampbell
- Home stadium: Javelina Stadium

1955 Lone Star Conference football standings
	Conf.					Overall
Team	W		L		T	W		L		T
Sam Houston State +	5	–	1	–	0	6	–	1	–	2
Southwest Texas State +	5	–	1	–	0	6	–	1	–	2
East Texas State +	5	–	1	–	0	5	–	4	–	1
Stephen F. Austin	2	–	4	–	0	5	–	4	–	0
Lamar Tech	2	–	4	–	0	4	–	6	–	0
Texas A&I	2	–	4	–	0	4	–	6	–	0
Sul Ross	0	–	6	–	0	2	–	8	–	0
+ – Conference co-champions

The 1955 Texas A&I Javelinas football team represented the Texas College of Arts and Industries—now known as Texas A&M University–Kingsville—as a member of the Lone Star Conference (LSC) during the 1955 college football season. Led by second-year head coach Gil Steinke, the Javelinas compiled an overall record of 4–6 with a mark of 2–4 in conference play, placing in a three-way tie for third in the LSC.

== Schedule ==
Date	Time	Opponent	Site	Result	Attendance	Source
September 10		vs. National University of Mexico*	Sams Stadium; Brownsville, TX	W 13–7	3,595	
September 17		at Howard Payne*	Brownwood, TX	L 20–21		
September 24	8:00 p.m.	Texas Lutheran*	Javelina Stadium; Kingsville, TX	W 33–13	5,000	
October 1	8:00 p.m.	Trinity (TX)*	Javelina Stadium; Kingsville, TX	L 0–34		
October 8		at Southwest Texas State	Evans Field; San Marcos, TX	L 21–26	5,500	
October 15		Sam Houston State	Javelina Stadium; Kingsville, TX	L 25–36		
October 22		Sul Ross^{†}	Javelina Stadium; Kingsville, TX	W 26–7		
October 29		at Stephen F. Austin	Nacogdoches, TX	W 13–12		
November 5		East Texas State	Memorial Stadium; Commerce, TX	L 7–14	8,000	
November 12		Lamar Tech	Javelina Stadium; Kingsville, TX	L 9–20		
*Non-conference game; ^{†}Homecoming; All times are in Central time
