= 1955 Southwestern Louisiana Bulldogs football team =

American college football season

1955 Southwestern Louisiana Bulldogs football
- Conference: Gulf States Conference
- Record: 5–4 (3–3 GSC)
- Head coach: Raymond Didier (5th season)
- Home stadium: McNaspy Stadium

1955 Gulf States Conference football standings
	Conf.					Overall
Team	W		L		T	W		L		T
Louisiana Tech $	6	–	0	–	0	9	–	1	–	0
McNeese State	5	–	1	–	0	7	–	1	–	1
Southeastern Louisiana	4	–	2	–	0	5	–	5	–	0
Southwestern Louisiana	3	–	3	–	0	5	–	4	–	0
Northwestern State	2	–	4	–	0	4	–	5	–	0
Northeast Louisiana State	1	–	5	–	0	4	–	6	–	0
Louisiana College	0	–	6	–	0	2	–	8	–	0
$ – Conference champion

The 1955 Southwestern Louisiana Bulldogs football team was an American football team that represented the Southwestern Louisiana Institute of Liberal and Technical Learning (now known as the University of Louisiana at Lafayette) in the Gulf States Conference during the 1955 college football season. In their fifth year under head coach Raymond Didier, the team compiled a 5–4 record.

== Schedule ==
Date	Time	Opponent	Site	Result	Attendance	Source
September 17		at Lamar Tech*	Greenie Stadium; Beaumont, TX (rivalry)	L 6–19	5,000	
September 24		at Southeastern Louisiana	Strawberry Stadium; Hammond, LA (rivalry)	L 0–20		
October 1	8:00 p.m.	East Texas State*	McNaspy Stadium; Lafayette, LA	W 20–15		
October 8		at Northeast Louisiana State	Brown Stadium; Monroe, LA (rivalry)	W 26–6		
October 15		Corpus Christi*	McNaspy Stadium; Lafayette, LA	W 49–12		
October 29		at Louisiana Tech	Tech Stadium; Ruston, LA (rivalry)	L 14–28	6,000	
November 5		Louisiana College	McNaspy Stadium; Lafayette, LA	W 21–14		
November 12		Northwestern State	McNaspy Stadium; Lafayette, LA	W 27–13		
November 19		McNeese State	McNaspy Stadium; Lafayette, LA (rivalry)	L 7–12		
*Non-conference game
