= 1948 CCUNC Owls football team =

American college football season

1948 CCUNC Owls football
- Conference: Independent
- Record: 0–5
- Head coach: Carroll Blackwell (1st season)
- Home stadium: American Legion Memorial Stadium

1948 Southern non-major college football independents records
	Conf.			Overall
Team	W	L	T	W		L		T
Maryland State		–		7	–	1	–	0
Sewanee		–		6	–	1	–	1
Grambling		–		8	–	2	–	0
East Tennessee State		–		6	–	2	–	1
Delaware		–		5	–	3	–	0
Memphis State		–		6	–	5	–	0
Tennessee Tech		–		5	–	6	–	0
Oklahoma City		–		4	–	5	–	1
Marshall		–		2	–	7	–	1
Tampa		–		2	–	6	–	0
Texas State		–		0	–	8	–	1
CCUNC		–		0	–	5	–	0

The 1948 CCUNC Owls football team was an American football team that represented the Charlotte Center of the University of North Carolina or CCUNC (now known as the University of North Carolina at Charlotte) as an independent during the 1948 college football season. In their first season under head coach Carroll Blackwell, the team compiled a 0–5 record. The CCUNC program was disbanded prior to the 1949 season as there were not enough players to field the team. Football was reinstated for the 2013 season as the Charlotte 49ers.

== Schedule ==
Date	Opponent	Site	Result	Source
September 17	at Albemarle H.S.	Albemarle H.S. Stadium; Albemarle, NC	L 0–8	
September 25	at Appalachian State JV	College Field; Boone, NC	L 0–20	
October 7	Lenoir–Rhyne JV	American Legion Memorial Stadium; Charlotte, NC	L 12–25	
October 15	at Wofford JV	Snyder Field; Spartanburg, SC	L 0–38	
October 27	Catawba JV	Richard Field; Charlotte, NC	L 2–27	
