= Paul Pierce (American football) =

American football player and coach (1914–2004)

Biographical details
- Born: December 29, 1914; Hill, New Mexico, U.S.
- Died: March 31, 2004 (aged 89); Austin, Texas, U.S

Playing career
- 1932–1933: Schreiner
- 1934–1935: Sul Ross

Coaching career (HC unless noted)
- 1945: Bainbridge
- 1946–1951: Sul Ross
- 1952–1967: Sam Houston State
- 1976–1977: Sul Ross

Administrative career (AD unless noted)
- 1952–1969: Sam Houston State

Head coaching record
- Overall: 148–85–9
- Bowls: 3–1–2
- Tournaments: 1–0–1 (NAIA playoffs)

Accomplishments and honors

Championships
- 1 NAIA (1964); 5 LSC (1950, 1955–1956, 1961, 1964)

Awards
- Knute Rockne Little All-American Coach of the Year (1965)

Paul Edward "Red" Pierce (December 29, 1914 – March 31, 2004) was an American college football player and coach. He served two stints as head football coach at Sul Ross State University, from 1946 to 1951 and again from to 1976 to 1977, and one stint at Sam Houston State University, from 1952 to 1967, amassing a career college football head coaching record of 143–81–9. His 1964 Sam Houston State Bearkats football team shared the NAIA Football National Championship after tying the Concordia Cobbers in the title game.

== Early years ==
A native of Hill, New Mexico, Pierce grew up in Fort Stockton, Texas, graduating from high school there in 1932. He went on to attend Schreiner Institute (now Schreiner University) in Kerrville, Texas, where he earned his associate of arts degree while playing football, basketball and track. Pierce continued his collegiate career at Sul Ross State Teachers College (now Sul Ross State University) in Alpine, Texas. He participated in varsity football and basketball, and graduated two years later with his Bachelor of Science degree in chemistry. He earned his Ed.D. degree from the University of Houston in 1961.

During World War II, Pierce served as a gunnery officer in the US Navy, and became the head football coach at the United States Naval Training Center Bainbridge in Port Deposit, Maryland near the conclusion of the war.

== Coaching career ==
In 1946 Pierce was hired at his alma mater Sul Ross State to rebuild a football program that was discontinued during the war. He guided the Lobos to 18 consecutive wins, four conference championships and two bowl games, including the 1949 Tangerine Bowl in Orlando, Florida.

In 1952, Pierce became the head football coach, head track coach and athletic director at Sam Houston State. His teams at SHSU tied for four conference championships and played in five bowl games. His 1964 Bearcat team tied Concordia College for a National Association of Intercollegiate Athletics co-championship. In 1965, he was named the Knute Rockne Little All-American Coach of the Year.

He returned to Sul Ross in 1968 as a professor of health and education and chairman of the physical education department. Although better known for his football teams, he had an outstanding record at Sul Ross as the women's volleyball coach. From 1971 to 1975, he directed them to the national tournament three times, won the national championship and placed fifth in the nation twice.

== Head coaching record ==
Year	Team	Overall	Conference	Standing	Bowl/playoffs
Bainbridge Commodores (Independent) (1945)
1945	Bainbridge	5–4			
Bainbridge:		5–4			
Sul Ross Lobos (New Mexico Intercollegiate Conference) (1946–1949)
1946	Sul Ross	5–5			
1947	Sul Ross	7–3	5–0	1st	
1948	Sul Ross	10–0–1	5–0	1st	T Tangerine
1949	Sul Ross	7–3	5–0	1st	
Sul Ross Lobos (Lone Star Conference) (1950–1951)
1950	Sul Ross	8–2–1	3–0–1	1st	
1951	Sul Ross	3–7	1–4	6th	
Sam Houston State Bearkats (Lone Star Conference) (1952–1967)
1952	Sam Houston State	6–4	2–3	T–3rd	W Shrimp
1953	Sam Houston State	9–1	4–1	2nd	W Refrigerator
1954	Sam Houston State	6–4	3–3	T–3rd	
1955	Sam Houston State	6–1–2	5–1	T–1st	
1956	Sam Houston State	10–0	6–0	1st	W Refrigerator
1957	Sam Houston State	3–5–1	3–3–1	4th	
1958	Sam Houston State	7–3	5–2	T–2nd	L Christmas Festival
1959	Sam Houston State	5–5	3–4	T–5th	
1960	Sam Houston State	3–6	2–5	6th	
1961	Sam Houston State	8–1	7–0	1st	
1962	Sam Houston State	5–3–1	4–2–1	3rd	
1963	Sam Houston State	4–3–1	2–3–1	5th	
1964	Sam Houston State	9–1–1	5–1	1st	T NAIA Championship
1965	Sam Houston State	4–6	1–5	6th	
1966	Sam Houston State	6–3–1	4–2–1	T–2nd	
1967	Sam Houston State	3–6	1–6	7th	
Sam Houston State:		94–52–7	57–41–4		
Sul Ross Lobos (Texas Intercollegiate Athletic Association) (1976–1977)
1976	Sul Ross	7–2	3–1	2nd	
1977	Sul Ross	2–7	0–4	5th	
Sul Ross:		49–29–2			
Total:		148–85–9			
National championship Conference title Conference division title or championship game berth
