= 1955 Sam Houston State Bearkats football team =

American college football season

1955 Sam Houston State Bearkats football

LSC co-champion
- Conference: Lone Star Conference
- Record: 6–1–2 (5–1 LSC)
- Head coach: Paul Pierce (4th season)
- Home stadium: Pritchett Field

1955 Lone Star Conference football standings
	Conf.					Overall
Team	W		L		T	W		L		T
Sam Houston State +	5	–	1	–	0	6	–	1	–	2
Southwest Texas State +	5	–	1	–	0	6	–	1	–	2
East Texas State +	5	–	1	–	0	5	–	4	–	1
Stephen F. Austin	2	–	4	–	0	5	–	4	–	0
Lamar Tech	2	–	4	–	0	4	–	6	–	0
Texas A&I	2	–	4	–	0	4	–	6	–	0
Sul Ross	0	–	6	–	0	2	–	8	–	0
+ – Conference co-champions

The 1955 Sam Houston State Bearkats football team was an American football team that represented Sam Houston State Teachers College—now known as Sam Houston State University–as a member of the Lone Star Conference (LSC) during the 1955 college football season. Led by fourth-year head coach Paul Pierce, the Bearkats compiled an overall record of 6–1–2 with a mark of 5–1 in conference play, sharing the LSC title with East Texas State and Southwest Texas State.

== Schedule ==
Date	Opponent	Site	Result	Attendance	Source
September 17	at McNeese State*	Lake Charles, LA	T 26–26		
September 24	Howard Payne*	Pritchett Field; Huntsville, TX	T 14–14		
October 1	at Texas Lutheran*	Seguin, TX	W 26–7		
October 8	Sul Ross	Pritchett Field; Huntsville, TX	W 47–7		
October 15	at Texas A&I	Javelina Stadium; Kingsville, TX	W 36–25		
October 22	Lamar Tech	Pritchett Field; Huntsville, TX	W 46–13		
October 29	East Texas State^{†}	Pritchett Field; Huntsville, TX	L 0–14	7,000	
November 12	at Southwest Texas State	San Marcos, TX	W 16–14	4,700	
November 19	at Stephen F. Austin	Nacogdoches, TX (rivalry)	W 27–6		
*Non-conference game; ^{†}Homecoming
