= 1948 Maryland State Raiders football team =

American college football season

1948 Maryland State Raiders football
- Conference: Independent
- Record: 7–1
- Head coach: Vernon McCain (1st season)

1948 Southern non-major college football independents records
	Conf.			Overall
Team	W	L	T	W		L		T
Maryland State		–		7	–	1	–	0
Sewanee		–		6	–	1	–	1
Grambling		–		8	–	2	–	0
East Tennessee State		–		6	–	2	–	1
Delaware		–		5	–	3	–	0
Memphis State		–		6	–	5	–	0
Tennessee Tech		–		5	–	6	–	0
Oklahoma City		–		4	–	5	–	1
Marshall		–		2	–	7	–	1
Tampa		–		2	–	6	–	0
Texas State		–		0	–	8	–	1
CCUNC		–		0	–	5	–	0

The 1948 Maryland State Raiders football team was an American football team that represented Maryland State College (now known as University of Maryland Eastern Shore) during the 1948 college football season. In its first season under head coach Vernon McCain, the team compiled an 7–1 record. The team played three games against interracial teams, defeating teams from Albright, Glassboro State, and Bridgeport.

Key players included freshman halfback Sylvester Polk. Polk scored five touchdowns on seven running attempts against Morris College and ranked among the nation's scoring leaders in 1947.

The 1948 season was the school's first under the common name Maryland State College. It was officially known as the University of Maryland's College for Negroes at Princess Anne and had previously been known as Maryland's Agricultural and Mechanical College for Negroes, though it had been commonly referred to as Princess Anne College. In 1948, the school's president, Dr. J. T. Williams, discarded the "Princess Anne College" name because "people thought it might be a girl's finishing school . . . it embarrassed the football team."

== Schedule ==
Date	Opponent	Site	Result	Attendance	Source
September 18	at Virginia Union	Richmond, VA	L 0–24		
September 25	Morris	Princess Anne, MD	W 57–0		
October 9	South Carolina State	Princess Anne, MD	W 14–6		
October 16	at Albright	Reading, PA	W 25–0		
October 23	at Glassboro State	College Field; Glassboro, NJ	W 25–0		
October 30	Cheyney	Princess Anne, MD	W 25–0		
November 13	at Bridgeport	Candlelite Field; Bridgeport, CT	W 26–13	5,000	
November 25	at Fayetteville State	Fayetteville, NC	W 33–0		
