= 1955 East Texas State Lions football team =

American college football season

1955 East Texas State Lions football

LSC co-champion
- Conference: Lone Star Conference
- Record: 5–4–1 (5–1 LSC)
- Head coach: Jules V. Sikes (2nd season)
- Home stadium: Memorial Stadium

1955 Lone Star Conference football standings
	Conf.					Overall
Team	W		L		T	W		L		T
Sam Houston State +	5	–	1	–	0	6	–	1	–	2
Southwest Texas State +	5	–	1	–	0	6	–	1	–	2
East Texas State +	5	–	1	–	0	5	–	4	–	1
Stephen F. Austin	2	–	4	–	0	5	–	4	–	0
Lamar Tech	2	–	4	–	0	4	–	6	–	0
Texas A&I	2	–	4	–	0	4	–	6	–	0
Sul Ross	0	–	6	–	0	2	–	8	–	0
+ – Conference co-champions

The 1955 East Texas State Lions football team was an American football team that represented East Texas State Teachers College—now known as East Texas A&M University–as a member of the Lone Star Conference (LSC) during the 1955 college football season. Led by second-year head coach Jules V. Sikes, the Lions compiled an overall record of 5–4 with a mark of 5–1 in conference play, sharing the LSC title with Sam Houston State and Southwest Texas State.

== Schedule ==
Date	Time	Opponent	Site	Result	Attendance	Source
September 24	8:00 p.m.	Abilene Christian*	Memorial Stadium; Commerce, TX	T 7–7	6,000	
October 1	8:00 p.m.	at Southwestern Louisiana*	McNaspy Stadium; Lafayette, LA	L 15–20		
October 8		at Trinity (TX)*	San Antonio, TX	L 20–35		
October 15		Lamar Tech	Memorial Stadium; Commerce, TX	W 33–7		
October 22		Austin*	Memorial Stadium; Commerce, TX	L 7–12		
October 29		at Sam Houston State	Pritchett Field; Huntsville, TX	W 14–0	7,000	
November 5		Texas A&I^{†}	Memorial Stadium; Commerce, TX	W 14–7	8,000	
November 12		Stephen F. Austin	Memorial Stadium; Commerce, TX	W 33–14		
November 19		at Southwest Texas State	Evans Field; San Marcos, TX	L 7–27	5,500	
November 24		at Sul Ross	Alpine, TX	W 14–0		
*Non-conference game; ^{†}Homecoming; All times are in Central time
