= 1948 Humboldt State Lumberjacks football team =

American college football season

1948 Humboldt State Lumberjacks football
- Conference: Far Western Conference
- Record: 6–3 (1–3 FWC)
- Head coach: Lou Tsoutsouvas (1st season)
- Home stadium: Redwood Bowl

1948 Far Western Conference football standings
	Conf.					Overall
Team	W		L		T	W		L		T
Chico State +	3	–	1	–	0	5	–	3	–	0
Southern Oregon +	3	–	1	–	0	5	–	5	–	0
San Francisco State	2	–	2	–	0	3	–	5	–	0
Humboldt State	1	–	3	–	0	6	–	3	–	0
Cal Aggies	1	–	3	–	0	2	–	6	–	0
+ – Conference co-champions

The 1948 Humboldt State Lumberjacks football team represented Humboldt State College—now known as California State Polytechnic University, Humboldt—as a member of the Far Western Conference (FWC) during the 1948 college football season. Led by Lou Tsoutsouvas in his first and only season as head coach, the Lumberjacks compiled an overall record of 6–3 with a mark of 1–3 in conference play, tying for fourth place in the FWC, and outscored their opponents 145 to 48 for the season. The team played home games at the Redwood Bowl in Arcata, California.

== Schedule ==
Date	Opponent	Site	Result	Source
September 19	Fairfield*	Redwood Bowl; Arcata, CA	W 34–0	
September 25	La Verne*	Redwood Bowl; Arcata, CA	W 27–0	
October 2	Southern Oregon	Redwood Bowl; Arcata, CA	W 6–0	
October 8	at San Francisco State	Cox Stadium; San Francisco, CA	L 7–13	
October 15	Portland State*	Redwood Bowl; Arcata, CA	W 13–7	
October 23	at Cal Aggies	A Street field; Davis, CA	L 7–15	
October 29	Cal Poly San Dimas*	Redwood Bowl; Arcata, CA	W 26–6	
November 6	Chico State	Redwood Bowl; Arcata, CA	L 0–7	
November 11	Oregon College*	Redwood Bowl; Arcata, CA	W 25–0	
*Non-conference game
