= 1948 Chico State Wildcats football team =

American college football season

1948 Chico State Wildcats football

FWC co-champion
- Conference: Far Western Conference
- Record: 5–3 (3–1 FWC)
- Head coach: Roy Bohler (7th season)
- Home stadium: Chico High School Stadium

1948 Far Western Conference football standings
	Conf.					Overall
Team	W		L		T	W		L		T
Chico State +	3	–	1	–	0	5	–	3	–	0
Southern Oregon +	3	–	1	–	0	5	–	5	–	0
San Francisco State	2	–	2	–	0	3	–	5	–	0
Humboldt State	1	–	3	–	0	6	–	3	–	0
Cal Aggies	1	–	3	–	0	2	–	6	–	0
+ – Conference co-champions

The 1948 Chico State Wildcats football team represented Chico State College—now known as California State University, Chico—as a member of the Far Western Conference (FWC) during the 1948 college football season. Led by seventh-year head coach Roy Bohler, Chico State compiled an overall record of 5–3 with a mark of 3–1 in conference play, sharing the FWC title with Southern Oregon. The team outscored its opponents 101 to 79 for the season. The Wildcats played home games at Chico High School Stadium in Chico, California.

== Schedule ==
Date	Opponent	Site	Result	Source
September 25	Naval Air Station Alameda (Note: Naval Air Station Alameda was a Naval Air Station from 1940 to 1997. For many years they fielded a team that played against colleges and other military teams.)*	Chico High School Stadium; Chico, CA	L 0–7	
October 1	at Oregon College*	McArthur Field; Monmouth, OR	W 20–7	
October 9	Saint Martin's*	Chico High School Stadium; Chico, CA	W 28–0	
October 16	Cal Aggies	Chico High School Stadium; Chico, CA	W 19–7	
October 22	at San Francisco State	Cox Stadium; San Francisco, CA	W 6–0	
October 30	Southern Oregon	Chico High School Stadium; Chico, CA	L 7–32	
November 6	at Humboldt State	Redwood Bowl; Arcata, CA	W 7–0	
November 13	at California JV (Note: The University of California JV team was commonly known as the "Cal Ramblers".)*	California Memorial Stadium; Berkeley, CA	L 14–26	
*Non-conference game
