= 1948 Sul Ross Lobos football team =

American college football season

1948 Sul Ross Lobos football

NMC champion

Tangerine Bowl, T 21–21 vs. Murray State
- Conference: New Mexico Conference
- Record: 10–0–1 (5–0 NMC)
- Head coach: Paul Pierce (3rd season)
- Home stadium: Jackson Field

1948 New Mexico Conference football standings
	Conf.					Overall
Team	W		L		T	W		L		T
Sul Ross $	5	–	0	–	0	10	–	0	–	1
Adams State	3	–	1	–	0	6	–	2	–	0
Eastern New Mexico	5	–	2	–	0	6	–	3	–	0
New Mexico Highlands	2	–	3	–	1	?	–	?	–	?
New Mexico Teachers	2	–	3	–	1	3	–	4	–	1
New Mexico Military	2	–	3	–	0	4	–	5	–	0
Panhandle A&M	1	–	5	–	1	1	–	7	–	1
St. Michael's (NM)	0	–	3	–	1	0	–	5	–	1
$ – Conference champion

The 1948 Sul Ross Lobos football team represented Sul Ross State University during the 1948 college football season. In their third season under head coach Paul Pierce, the Lobos compiled a 10–0–1 record, won the New Mexico Conference (NMC) with a 5–0 record against conference opponents, and outscored their opponents by a total of 452 to 133. Sul Ross was invited to the 1949 Tangerine Bowl, where they tied 9–1 Murray State.

Sul Ross was ranked at No. 120 in the final Litkenhous Difference by Score System ratings for 1948.

== Schedule ==
Date	Opponent	Site	Result	Attendance	Source
September 18	at Sam Houston State*	Pritchett Field; Huntsville, TX	W 20–19		
September 24	at Daniel Baker*	Brownwood, TX	W 34–6		
October 2	Eastern New Mexico	Jackson Field; Alpine, TX	W 52–0	3,000	
October 8	at Panhandle A&M	Goodwell, OK	W 44–6		
October 16	New Mexico State*	Jackson Field; Alpine, TX	W 47–12		
October 23	Corpus Christi*	Jackson Field; Alpine, TX	W 21–14		
October 30	at Texas A&I*	Javelina Field; Kingsville, TX	W 33–19	9,000	
November 6	at Adams State	Alamosa, CO	W 34–24		
November 13	New Mexico Teachers	Jackson Field; Alpine, TX	W 69–6		
November 20	St. Michael's (NM)	Jackson Field; Alpine, TX	W 77–6	3,500	
January 1, 1949	vs. Murray State*	Tangerine Bowl; Orlando, FL (Tangerine Bowl)	T 21–21	9,000	
*Non-conference game

== Game summaries ==
=== Vs. Murray State (Tangerine Bowl) ===
Murray State Racers vs. Sul Ross Lobos (1949 Tangerine Bowl) – Game summary

Quarter	1	2	3	4	Total
Thoroughbreds	0	7	0	14	21
Lobos	7	14	0	0	21

at Tangerine Bowl, Orlando, Florida

- Date: January 1, 1949
- Game attendance: 9,000

Game information
First quarter
- SRS – Ted Scown 1-yard run (Frank Barton kick). Lobos 7–0.

Second quarter

- SRS – Ted Scown 13-yard run (Frank Barton kick). Lobos 14–0.
- SRS – Ted Scown 29-yard pass from Charles Laffoon (Frank Barton kick). Lobos 21–0.
- MS – Joe Bronson 85-yard kickoff return (Bob Sanders kick). Lobos 21–7.

Third quarter

- No scoring plays

Fourth quarter

- MS – Dale McDaniels 7-yard run (Bob Sanders kick). Lobos 21–14.
- MS – Dale McDaniels 36-yard run (Bob Sanders kick). Tied 21–21.
