= 1955 Louisiana Tech Bulldogs football team =

American college football season

1955 Louisiana Tech Bulldogs football

GSC champion
- Conference: Gulf States Conference
- Record: 9–1 (6–0 GSC)
- Head coach: Joe Aillet (15th season)
- Captains: Charles Anderson; Russell Rainbolt
- Home stadium: Tech Stadium

1955 Gulf States Conference football standings
	Conf.					Overall
Team	W		L		T	W		L		T
Louisiana Tech $	6	–	0	–	0	9	–	1	–	0
McNeese State	5	–	1	–	0	7	–	1	–	1
Southeastern Louisiana	4	–	2	–	0	5	–	5	–	0
Southwestern Louisiana	3	–	3	–	0	5	–	4	–	0
Northwestern State	2	–	4	–	0	4	–	5	–	0
Northeast Louisiana State	1	–	5	–	0	4	–	6	–	0
Louisiana College	0	–	6	–	0	2	–	8	–	0
$ – Conference champion

The 1955 Louisiana Tech Bulldogs football team was an American football team that represented the Louisiana Polytechnic Institute (now known as Louisiana Tech University) as a member of the Gulf States Conference during the 1955 college football season. In their fifteenth year under head coach Joe Aillet, the team compiled a 9–1 record and finished as Gulf States Conference champion.

== Schedule ==
Date	Opponent	Site	Result	Attendance	Source
September 17	at Louisiana College	Alumni Stadium; Pineville, LA	W 40–7	5,500	
September 24	Mississippi Southern*	Tech Stadium; Ruston, LA (rivalry)	L 6–7	7,500	
October 1	Abilene Christian*	Tech Stadium; Ruston, LA	W 21–7		
October 8	at McNeese State	Lake Charles H.S. Stadium; Lake Charles, LA	W 14–0		
October 15	at Howard Payne*	Lion Stadium; Brownwood, TX	W 26–7		
October 22	vs. Northwestern State	State Fair Stadium; Shreveport, LA (rivalry)	W 21–20		
October 29	Southwestern Louisiana^{†}	Tech Stadium; Ruston, LA (rivalry)	W 28–14	6,000	
November 5	at Southeastern Louisiana	Strawberry Stadium; Hammond, LA	W 21–0		
November 12	Austin*	Tech Stadium; Ruston, LA	W 40–21		
November 19	Northeast Louisiana State	Tech Stadium; Ruston, LA (rivalry)	W 34–14		
*Non-conference game; ^{†}Homecoming
