= 1948 Wiley Wildcats football team =

American college football season

1948 Wiley Wildcats football
- Conference: Southwestern Athletic Conference
- Record: 0–9–1 (0–6–1 SWAC)
- Head coach: L. A. "King" Carter (1st season)
- Home stadium: Wiley Field

1948 Southwestern Athletic Conference football standings
| | Conf. | | | | | Overall |
| Team | W | | L | | T | W | | L | | T |
|---|---|---|---|---|---|---|---|---|---|---|
| No. 1 Southern $ | 7 | – | 0 | – | 0 | 12 | – | 0 | – | 0 |
| No. 7 Texas College | 5 | – | 2 | – | 0 | 8 | – | 3 | – | 0 |
| Langston | 5 | – | 2 | – | 0 | 7 | – | 3 | – | 0 |
| Prairie View A&M | 4 | – | 2 | – | 1 | 6 | – | 4 | – | 1 |
| Samuel Huston | 3 | – | 4 | – | 0 | 5 | – | 5 | – | 0 |
| Arkansas AM&N | 2 | – | 5 | – | 0 | 4 | – | 5 | – | 1 |
| Bishop | 1 | – | 5 | – | 1 | 2 | – | 7 | – | 1 |
| Wiley | 0 | – | 7 | – | 0 | 0 | – | 9 | – | 1 |
$ – Conference champion; Rankings from The Pittsburgh Courier

The 1948 Wiley Wildcats football team represented Wiley College as a member of the Southwestern Athletic Conference (SWAC) during the 1948 college football season. Led by first-year head coach L. A. "King" Carter, the Wildcats compiled an overall record of 0–9–1, with a conference record of 0–6–1, and finished eighth in the SWAC.

== Schedule ==
| Date | Opponent | Site | Result | Attendance | Source |
|---|---|---|---|---|---|
| September 18 | Texas State* | Wiley Field; Marshall, TX | T 6–6 | | |
| September 25 | at Grambling* | Tiger Stadium; Grambling, LA | L 0–38 | 4,000 | |
| October 2 | Arkansas AM&N | Wiley Field; Marshall, TX | L 0–19 | | |
| October 18 | vs. Prairie View A&M | Cotton Bowl; Dallas, TX | L 0–18 | 20,000 | |
| October 23 | at Lane* | Rothrock Field; Jackson, TN | L 6–32 | | |
| November 6 | at Langston | Anderson Field; Langston, OK | L 0–40 | 2,000 | |
| November 13 | Southern | Wiley Field; Marshall, TX | L 0–19 | | |
| November 20 | Samuel Huston | Wiley Field; Marshall, TX | L 12–25 | | |
| November 25 | at Texas College | Steer Stadium; Tyler, TX | L 0–19 | | |
| December 4 | at Bishop | Tiger Stadium; Marshall, TX | L 13–22 | | |
*Non-conference game
