= 1955 McNeese State Cowboys football team =

American college football season

1955 McNeese State Cowboys football
- Conference: Gulf States Conference
- Record: 7–1–1 (5–1 GSC)
- Head coach: John Gregory (1st season)
- Home stadium: Wildcat Stadium

1955 Gulf States Conference football standings
| | Conf. | | | | | Overall |
| Team | W | | L | | T | W | | L | | T |
|---|---|---|---|---|---|---|---|---|---|---|
| Louisiana Tech $ | 6 | – | 0 | – | 0 | 9 | – | 1 | – | 0 |
| McNeese State | 5 | – | 1 | – | 0 | 7 | – | 1 | – | 1 |
| Southeastern Louisiana | 4 | – | 2 | – | 0 | 5 | – | 5 | – | 0 |
| Southwestern Louisiana | 3 | – | 3 | – | 0 | 5 | – | 4 | – | 0 |
| Northwestern State | 2 | – | 4 | – | 0 | 4 | – | 5 | – | 0 |
| Northeast Louisiana State | 1 | – | 5 | – | 0 | 4 | – | 6 | – | 0 |
| Louisiana College | 0 | – | 6 | – | 0 | 2 | – | 8 | – | 0 |
$ – Conference champion

The 1955 McNeese State Cowboys football team was an American football team that represented the McNeese State College—now known as McNeese State University–as a member of the Gulf States Conference (GSC) during the 1955 college football season. Led by first-year head coach John Gregory, the Cowboys compiled and overall record of 7–1–1 with a mark of 5–1 in conference play, placing second in the GSC.

== Schedule ==
| Date | Opponent | Site | Result | Source |
|---|---|---|---|---|
| September 17 | Sam Houston State* | Wildcat Stadium; Lake Charles, LA | T 26–26 | |
| October 1 | Northwestern State | Wildcat Stadium; Lake Charles, LA (rivalry) | W 14–6 | |
| October 8 | Louisiana Tech | Wildcat Stadium; Lake Charles, LA | L 0–14 | |
| October 15 | at Louisiana College | Alumni Field; Pineville, LA | W 26–0 | |
| October 22 | at Northeast Louisiana State | Brown Stadium; Monroe, LA | W 35–0 | |
| October 29 | Lamar Tech* | Wildcat Stadium; Lake Charles, LA (rivalry) | W 17–2 | |
| November 5 | at Texas Lutheran* | Seguin, TX | W 31–0 | |
| November 12 | Southeastern Louisiana | Wildcat Stadium; Lake Charles, LA | W 10–7 | |
| November 19 | at Southwestern Louisiana | McNaspy Stadium; Lafayette, LA (rivalry) | W 12–7 | |
*Non-conference game
