= 1948 Memphis State Tigers football team =

American college football season

1948 Memphis State Tigers football
- Conference: Independent
- Record: 6–5
- Head coach: Ralph Hatley (2nd season)
- Home stadium: Crump Stadium

1948 Southern non-major college football independents records
	Conf.			Overall
Team	W	L	T	W		L		T
Maryland State		–		7	–	1	–	0
Sewanee		–		6	–	1	–	1
Grambling		–		8	–	2	–	0
East Tennessee State		–		6	–	2	–	1
Delaware		–		5	–	3	–	0
Memphis State		–		6	–	5	–	0
Tennessee Tech		–		5	–	6	–	0
Oklahoma City		–		4	–	5	–	1
Marshall		–		2	–	7	–	1
Tampa		–		2	–	6	–	0
Texas State		–		0	–	8	–	1
CCUNC		–		0	–	5	–	0

The 1948 Memphis State Tigers football team was an American football team that represented Memphis State College (now known as the University of Memphis) as an independent during the 1948 college football season. In their second season under head coach Ralph Hatley, Memphis State compiled a 6–5 record.

Memphis State was ranked at No. 184 in the final Litkenhous Difference by Score System ratings for 1948.

== Schedule ==
Date	Time	Opponent	Site	Result	Attendance	Source
September 18		at Missouri Mines	Rolla, MO	L 0–6		
September 25		Louisville	Crump Stadium; Memphis, TN (rivalry)	W 13–7		
October 1		Murray State	Crump Stadium; Memphis, TN	L 14–26		
October 9		Tampa	Crump Stadium; Memphis, TN	W 43–16		
October 16		at Pensacola NAS	Pensacola, FL	L 21–27		
October 23		at Athens State	Athens, AL	W 45–0		
October 30		Union (TN)	Crump Stadium; Memphis, TN	W 21–0		
November 6	8:00 p.m.	Middle Tennessee	Crump Stadium; Memphis, TN	W 13–0	2,694	
November 11		Memphis NAS	Crump Stadium; Memphis, TN	L 0–14		
November 19		Arkansas State	Crump Stadium; Memphis, TN (Paint Bucket Bowl)	W 34–13		
November 25		at Louisiana Tech	Tech Stadium; Ruston, LA	L 14–20	4,000	
All times are in Central time
