= 1948 Middle Tennessee Blue Raiders football team =

American college football season

1948 Middle Tennessee Blue Raiders football
- Conference: Volunteer State Athletic Conference
- Record: 5–5 (2–2 VSAC)
- Head coach: Charles M. Murphy (2nd season)
- Captains: A. Varallo; William "Big Bill" Nisbett
- Home stadium: Horace Jones Field

1948 Volunteer State Athletic Conference football standings
	Conf.					Overall
Team	W		L		T	W		L		T
Austin Peay +	2	–	0	–	0	8	–	2	–	0
Tennessee Tech +	2	–	0	–	0	5	–	6	–	0
Milligan	1	–	0	–	0	9	–	1	–	1
Middle Tennessee	2	–	2	–	0	5	–	5	–	0
Union (TN)	1	–	3	–	0	3	–	7	–	0
Cumberland (TN)	0	–	3	–	0	3	–	6	–	0
+ – Conference co-champions

The 1948 Middle Tennessee Blue Raiders football team represented the Middle Tennessee State College—now known as Middle Tennessee State University—as a member of the Volunteer State Athletic Conference (VSAC) during the 1948 college football season. Led by second-year head coach Charles M. Murphy, the Blue Raiders compiled a record an overall record of 5–5 with a mark of 2–2 in conference play, placing fourth in the VSAC. The team's captains were A. Varallo and B. Nesbitt.

== Schedule ==
Date	Time	Opponent	Site	Result	Attendance	Source
September 24		Southeast Missouri State*	Horace Jones Field; Murfreesboro, TN	W 20–7	2,500	
October 2	7:00 p.m.	at Maryville (TN)*	Maryville, TN	W 13–12		
October 7		at Union (TN)	Rothrock Field; Jackson, TN	W 13–9		
October 15	8:00 p.m.	Arkansas State*	Horace Jones Field; Murfreesboro, TN	W 14–7		
October 21		Milligan	Horace Jones Field; Murfreesboro, TN	L 0–7		
October 28	7:00 p.m.	at East Tennessee State*	State College Stadium; Johnson City, TN	L 0–2	3,000	
November 6	8:00 p.m.	at Memphis State*	Crump Stadium; Memphis, TN	L 0–13	2,694	
November 11		Murray State*^{†}	Horace Jones Field; Murfreesboro, TN	L 12–26		
November 18		Cumberland (TN)	Horace Jones Field; Murfreesboro, TN	W 13–0		
November 25		at Tennessee Tech	Overhill Field; Cookeville, TN	L 7–32	7,000	
*Non-conference game; ^{†}Homecoming; All times are in Central time
