= 1948 San Francisco State Gators football team =

American college football season

1948 San Francisco State Gators football

Fruit Bowl, L 0–30 vs. Southern
- Conference: Far Western Conference
- Record: 3–5 (2–2 FWC)
- Head coach: Dick Boyle (6th season)
- Home stadium: Cox Stadium

1948 Far Western Conference football standings
| | Conf. | | | | | Overall |
| Team | W | | L | | T | W | | L | | T |
|---|---|---|---|---|---|---|---|---|---|---|
| Chico State + | 3 | – | 1 | – | 0 | 5 | – | 3 | – | 0 |
| Southern Oregon + | 3 | – | 1 | – | 0 | 5 | – | 5 | – | 0 |
| San Francisco State | 2 | – | 2 | – | 0 | 3 | – | 5 | – | 0 |
| Humboldt State | 1 | – | 3 | – | 0 | 6 | – | 3 | – | 0 |
| Cal Aggies | 1 | – | 3 | – | 0 | 2 | – | 6 | – | 0 |
+ – Conference co-champions

The 1948 San Francisco State Gators football team represented San Francisco State College—now known as San Francisco State University—as a member of the Far Western Conference (FWC) during the 1948 college football season. Led by sixth-year head coach Dick Boyle, San Francisco State compiled an overall record of 3–5 with a mark of 2–2 in conference play, placing third in the FWC. For the season the team was outscored by its opponents 137 to 63. The Gators played home games at Cox Stadium in San Francisco.

At the end of the season, the Gators were invited to participate in the second annual Fruit Bowl. Held on December 5, it was the first interracial bowl game played in the United States. San Francisco State lost to Southwestern Athletic Conference (SWAC) champion Southern by a score of 30–0.

== Schedule ==
| Date | Opponent | Site | Result | Attendance | Source |
|---|---|---|---|---|---|
| October 1 | Whittier* | Cox Stadium; San Francisco, CA | W 18–7 | | |
| October 8 | Humboldt State | Cox Stadium; San Francisco, CA | W 13–7 | | |
| October 16 | at Southern Oregon | Walter E. Phillips Field?; Ashland, OR | L 7–26 | | |
| October 22 | Chico State | Cox Stadium; San Francisco, CA | L 0–6 | | |
| October 30 | at Cal Aggies^{†} | A Street field; Davis, CA | W 25–0 | 4,000 | |
| November 5 | Cal Poly* | Cox Stadium; San Francisco, CA | L 0–40 | | |
| November 13 | Occidental* | Cox Stadium; San Francisco, CA | L 0–21 | | |
| December 5 | vs. Southern* | Kezar Stadium; San Francisco, CA (Fruit Bowl) | L 0–30 | 5,000 | |
*Non-conference game; ^{†}Homecoming
