= 1948 Grambling Tigers football team =

American college football season

1948 Grambling Tigers football
- Conference: Independent
- Record: 8–2
- Head coach: Eddie Robinson (6th season)
- Home stadium: Tiger Stadium

1948 Southern non-major college football independents records
	Conf.			Overall
Team	W	L	T	W		L		T
Maryland State		–		7	–	1	–	0
Sewanee		–		6	–	1	–	1
Grambling		–		8	–	2	–	0
East Tennessee State		–		6	–	2	–	1
Delaware		–		5	–	3	–	0
Memphis State		–		6	–	5	–	0
Tennessee Tech		–		5	–	6	–	0
Oklahoma City		–		4	–	5	–	1
Marshall		–		2	–	7	–	1
Tampa		–		2	–	6	–	0
Texas State		–		0	–	8	–	1
CCUNC		–		0	–	5	–	0

The 1948 Grambling Tigers football team represented Grambling College (now known as Grambling State University) as an independent during the 1948 college football season. Led by sixth-year head coach Eddie Robinson, the Tigers compiled an overall record of 8–2.

== Schedule ==
Date	Opponent	Site	Result	Attendance	Source
September 25	Wiley	Tiger Stadium; Grambling, LA	W 38–0	4,000	
October 2	at Southern	University Stadium; Baton Rouge, LA (rivalry)	L 0–18	11,000	
October 9	Texas State	Tiger Stadium; Grambling, LA	W 61–0		
October 16	at Wilberforce	Wilberforce, OH	L 0–7	3,600	
October 23	at Bishop	Marshall, TX	W 25–14	4,000	
October 29	vs. Tillotson	Greenie Stadium; Beaumont, TX	W 25–7		
November 13	Prairie View A&M	Tiger Stadium; Grambling, LA	W 34–12	4,000	
November 20	vs. Florida N&I	Dorsey Park; Miami, FL	W 41–7	2,000	
November 27	at Bethune–Cookman	Memorial Stadium; Daytona Beach, FL	W 33–6		
December 4	vs. Texas College	Tech Stadium; Ruston, LA	W 26–20	8,500	
