= 1948 Arkansas State Indians football team =

American college football season

1948 Arkansas State Indians football
- Conference: Arkansas Intercollegiate Conference
- Record: 4–4–1 ( AIC)
- Head coach: Forrest England (3rd season)
- Captain: Harry Larche
- Home stadium: Kays Stadium

The 1948 Arkansas State Indians football team represented Arkansas State College—now known as Arkansas State University—as a member of the Arkansas Intercollegiate Conference (AIC) during the 1948 college football season. Led by third-year head coach Forrest England, the Indians compiled an overall record of 4–4–1.

== Schedule ==
Date	Opponent	Site	Result	Source
September 25	Mississippi College	Kays Stadium; Jonesboro, AR	W 14–0	
October 4	Western Kentucky	Kays Stadium; Jonesboro, AR	W 13–12	
October 9	at Kansas State	Memorial Stadium; Manhattan, KS	L 6–37	
October 15	at Middle Tennessee	Horace Jones Field; Murfreesboro, TN	L 7–14	
October 23	Delta State	Kays Stadium; Jonesboro, AR	T 13–13	
October 30	at Southern Illinois	McAndrew Stadium; Carbondale, IL	W 27–21	
November 6	Henderson State	Kays Stadium; Jonesboro, AR	W 34–14	
November 13	at Northwestern State	Demon Field; Natchitoches, LA	L 6–41	
November 19	at Memphis State	Crump Stadium; Memphis, TN (rivalry)	L 13–34	
