= 1948 Southern Jaguars football team =

American college football season

1948 Southern Jaguars football

Black college national co-champion SWAC champion

Fruit Bowl, W 30–3 vs. San Francisco State
- Conference: Southwestern Athletic Conference
- Record: 12–0 (7–0 SWAC)
- Head coach: Ace Mumford (13th season)
- Home stadium: University Stadium

1948 Southwestern Athletic Conference football standings
	Conf.					Overall
Team	W		L		T	W		L		T
No. 1 Southern $	7	–	0	–	0	12	–	0	–	0
No. 7 Texas College	5	–	2	–	0	8	–	3	–	0
Langston	5	–	2	–	0	7	–	3	–	0
Prairie View A&M	4	–	2	–	1	6	–	4	–	1
Samuel Huston	3	–	4	–	0	5	–	5	–	0
Arkansas AM&N	2	–	5	–	0	4	–	5	–	1
Bishop	1	–	5	–	1	2	–	7	–	1
Wiley	0	–	7	–	0	0	–	9	–	1
$ – Conference champion; Rankings from The Pittsburgh Courier

The 1948 Southern Jaguars football team was an American football team that represented Southern University in the 1948 college football season. In their 13th season under head coach Ace Mumford, the Jaguars compiled a 12–0 record, won the SWAC championship, shut out eight of 12 opponents, and outscored all opponents by a total of 395 to 33. The team played its home games at University Stadium in Baton Rouge, Louisiana. The team was recognized as the black college national champion.

== Schedule ==
Date	Opponent	Site	Result	Attendance	Source
September 25	at Texas State*	Buffalo Stadium; Houston, TX	W 38–0	3,000	
October 2	Grambling*	University Stadium; Baton Rouge, LA (rivalry)	W 18–0	11,000	
October 9	Samuel Huston	University Stadium; Baton Rouge, LA	W 41–0	5,000	
October 16	at Arkansas AM&N	Athletic Field; Pine Bluff, AR	W 27–6		
October 23	Langston	University Stadium; Baton Rouge, LA	W 46–0		
October 30	at Texas College	Rose Stadium; Tyler, TX	W 15–3	6,000	
November 6	Bishop^{†}	University Stadium; Baton Rouge, LA	W 45–0		
November 13	at Wiley	Wiley Field; Marshall, TX	W 19–0		
November 20	Florida A&M*	University Stadium; Baton Rouge, LA	W 37–12	7,000	
November 27	at Prairie View A&M	Prairie View, TX	W 19–0		
December 5	vs. San Francisco State*	Kezar Stadium; San Francisco, CA (Fruit Bowl)	W 30–0	5,000	
December 11	Xavier (LA)*	University Stadium; Baton Rouge, LA	W 60–12		
*Non-conference game; ^{†}Homecoming
