= Truman Bulldogs football =

Football program representing Truman State University

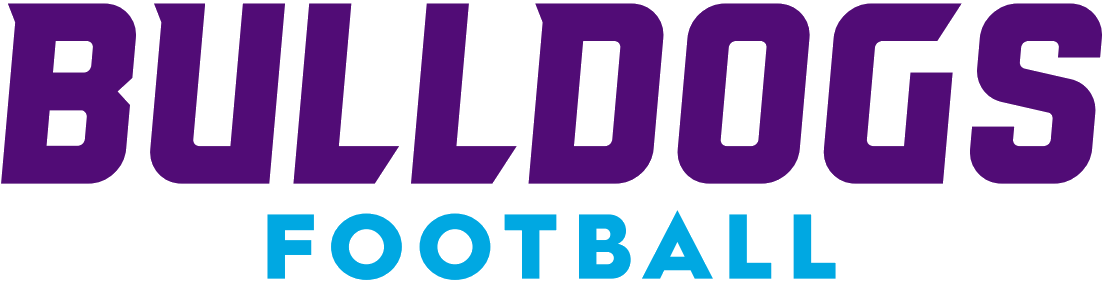
- First season: 1900; 126 years ago
- Athletic director: Jerry Wollmering
- Head coach: Kellen Nesbitt (interim); 1st season, 0–0 (–)
- Location: Kirksville, Missouri
- Stadium: Stokes Stadium (capacity: 4,000)
- NCAA division: Division II
- Conference: Great Lakes Valley Conference
- Colors: Purple and white
- All-time record: 551–393–34 (.581)
- Bowl record: 5–0–0 (1.000)

Conference championships
- 28
- Website: trumanbulldogs.com/football

The Truman Bulldogs football program represents Truman State University in college football and competes in the Division II level of the National Collegiate Athletic Association (NCAA). In 2013, Truman became a member of the Great Lakes Valley Conference and has remained in the league. Prior to this, Truman was in the Mid-America Intercollegiate Athletics Association from 1924 to 2012. TSU's home games are played at Stokes Stadium in Kirksville, Missouri.

== History ==
Truman's football program dates back to 1900 when the program went 3–2–1. Since their inaugural season, the Bulldogs have claimed 27 conference championships.

College Football Hall of Fame inductee Don Faurot was the head coach from 1926 to 1934. He led the team to a 27-game winning streak that included three consecutive perfect seasons in 1932, 1933, and 1934. The 1936 team compiled another perfect season under the leadership of Faurot's brother, Fred Faurot. The program has not compiled another perfect season since 1936.

== Conference affiliations ==
- Mid-America Intercollegiate Athletics Association (1924–2012)
- Great Lakes Valley Conference (2013–present)

== Stadium ==
The Bulldogs have played their home games at Stokes Stadium since 1930. Stokes Stadium was named for a former physics professor. The current capacity of the stadium is at 4,000.

== Championships ==
=== Conference championship seasons ===
Year	Conference	Coach	Overall record	Conference record
1924	Missouri Intercollegiate Athletic Association	H. L. McWilliams	4–3–2	2–0–2
1927	Missouri Intercollegiate Athletic Association	Don Faurot	8–1–0	4–0–0
1928†	Missouri Intercollegiate Athletic Association	Don Faurot	7–2–1	3–0–1
1929	Missouri Intercollegiate Athletic Association	Don Faurot	5–3–1	3–0–0
1930	Missouri Intercollegiate Athletic Association	Don Faurot	5–5–0	3–0–0
1932	Missouri Intercollegiate Athletic Association	Don Faurot	8–0–0	4–0–0
1933	Missouri Intercollegiate Athletic Association	Don Faurot	9–0–0	4–0–0
1934	Missouri Intercollegiate Athletic Association	Don Faurot	8–0–0	4–0–0
1935	Missouri Intercollegiate Athletic Association	Fred Faurot	7–2–0	5–0–0
1936	Missouri Intercollegiate Athletic Association	Fred Faurot	7–0–0	5–0–0
1951†	Missouri Intercollegiate Athletic Association	Maurice Wade	7–1–1	4–0–1
1952†	Missouri Intercollegiate Athletic Association	Maurice Wade	7–1–0	4–1–0
1953	Missouri Intercollegiate Athletic Association	Maurice Wade	6–2–0	5–0–0
1954	Missouri Intercollegiate Athletic Association	Maurice Wade	7–1–0	5–0–0
1960	Missouri Intercollegiate Athletic Association	Maurice Wade	8–1–0	5–0–0
1961	Missouri Intercollegiate Athletic Association	Maurice Wade	9–1–0	5–0–0
1964	Missouri Intercollegiate Athletic Association	Maurice Wade	7–2–0	5–0–0
1965	Missouri Intercollegiate Athletic Association	Maurice Wade	8–2–0	5–0–0
1969†	Missouri Intercollegiate Athletic Association	Russ Sloan	6–2–1	4–1–0
1970†	Missouri Intercollegiate Athletic Association	Russ Sloan	7–2–0	5–1–0
1971	Missouri Intercollegiate Athletic Association	Russ Sloan	9–1–0	6–0–0
1976†	Missouri Intercollegiate Athletic Association	Ron Taylor	5–3–1	4–1–1
1981	Missouri Intercollegiate Athletic Association	Bruce Craddock	6–4–0	4–1–0
1982	Missouri Intercollegiate Athletic Association	Bruce Craddock	9–2–0	5–0–0
1985	Missouri Intercollegiate Athletic Association	Jack Ball	8–3–0	5–0–0
1988†	Missouri Intercollegiate Athletic Association	Jack Ball	7–3–0	5–1–0
2016†	Great Lakes Valley Conference	Gregg Nesbitt	8–3	7–1
2026	Great Lakes Valley Conference	Kellen Nesbitt	7-4-0	7-1
Total Conference Championships:			27 (26, MIAA, 1 GLVC)	
† Denotes co-champions

== Postseason ==
=== Bowl games ===
#	Season	Game	Result	Opponent	Stadium	Location
1	1961	Mineral Water Bowl	W 22–8	Parsons	Roosevelt Stadium	Excelsior Springs, Missouri
2	2019	America's Crossroads Bowl	W 21–7	Ohio Dominican	Brickyard Stadium	Hobart, Indiana
3	2021	America's Crossroads Bowl	W 34–17	Hillsdale	Brickyard Stadium	Hobart, Indiana
4	2022	America's Crossroads Bowl	W 28–27	Tiffin	Brickyard Stadium	Hobart, Indiana
5	2024	America's Crossroads Bowl	W 29–10	Tiffin	Brickyard Stadium	Hobart, Indiana

=== NCAA Division II playoffs ===
The Bulldogs have made six appearances in the NCAA Division II playoffs, with a combined record of 0–5.

Year	Round	Opponent	Result
1982	First Round	Jacksonville State	L, 21–34
1990	First Round	Pittsburg State	L, 3–59
1992	First Round	North Dakota State	L, 7–42
1994	First Round	North Dakota	L, 6–18
2025	First Round	Indianapolis	L, 14–57
2026	First Round	Ferris State	TBP

== See also ==
- Truman Bulldogs
