= 1948 Prairie View A&M Panthers football team =

American college football season

1948 Prairie View A&M Panthers football

Prairie View Bowl, L 0–6 vs. Wilberforce State
- Conference: Southwestern Athletic Conference
- Record: 6–4–1 (4–2–1 SWAC)
- Head coach: Fred T. Long (1st season)
- Home stadium: Blackshear Field

1948 Southwestern Athletic Conference football standings
	Conf.					Overall
Team	W		L		T	W		L		T
No. 1 Southern $	7	–	0	–	0	12	–	0	–	0
No. 7 Texas College	5	–	2	–	0	8	–	3	–	0
Langston	5	–	2	–	0	7	–	3	–	0
Prairie View A&M	4	–	2	–	1	6	–	4	–	1
Samuel Huston	3	–	4	–	0	5	–	5	–	0
Arkansas AM&N	2	–	5	–	0	4	–	5	–	1
Bishop	1	–	5	–	1	2	–	7	–	1
Wiley	0	–	7	–	0	0	–	9	–	1
$ – Conference champion; Rankings from The Pittsburgh Courier

The 1948 Prairie View A&M Panthers football team was an American football team that represented Prairie View A&M College of Texas (now known as Prairie View A&M University) as a member of the Southwestern Athletic Conference (SWAC) during the 1948 college football season. In their first season under head coach Fred T. Long, the Panthers compiled an overall record of 6–4–1, with a mark of 4–2–1 in conference play, and finished fourth in the SWAC.

== Schedule ==
Date	Opponent	Site	Result	Attendance	Source
September 25	at Samuel Huston	Anderson High School Stadium; Austin, TX	W 26–6	3,000	
October 2	Bishop	Blackshear Field; Prairie View, TX	T 0–0		
October 9	at Tillotson*	Austin, TX	W 15–0		
October 18	vs. Wiley	Cotton Bowl; Dallas, TX	W 18–0	20,000	
October 23	Arkansas AM&N	Blackshear Field; Prairie View, TX	W 15–6		
October 29	at Texas State*	Buffalo Stadium; Houston, TX (rivalry)	W 21–0		
November 6	Texas College^{†}	Blackshear Field; Prairie View, TX	W 20–6	5,000	
November 13	at Grambling*	Tiger Stadium; Grambling, LA	L 12–34	4,000	
November 20	at Langston*	Anderson Field; Langston, OK	L 0–13	4,000	
November 6	Southern	Blackshear Field; Prairie View, TX	L 0–19		
January 1	vs. Wilberforce State*	Buffalo Stadium; Houston, TX (Prairie View Bowl)	L 0–6	8,358	
*Non-conference game; ^{†}Homecoming
