= 1955 Stephen F. Austin Lumberjacks football team =

American college football season

1955 Stephen F. Austin Lumberjacks football
- Conference: Lone Star Conference
- Record: 5–4 (2–4 LSC)
- Head coach: Ted Jefferies (9th season)

1955 Lone Star Conference football standings
	Conf.					Overall
Team	W		L		T	W		L		T
Sam Houston State +	5	–	1	–	0	6	–	1	–	2
Southwest Texas State +	5	–	1	–	0	6	–	1	–	2
East Texas State +	5	–	1	–	0	5	–	4	–	1
Stephen F. Austin	2	–	4	–	0	5	–	4	–	0
Lamar Tech	2	–	4	–	0	4	–	6	–	0
Texas A&I	2	–	4	–	0	4	–	6	–	0
Sul Ross	0	–	6	–	0	2	–	8	–	0
+ – Conference co-champions

The 1955 Stephen F. Austin Lumberjacks football team was an American football team that represented Stephen F. Austin State College—now known as Stephen F. Austin State University—as a member of the Lone Star Conference (LSC) during the 1955 college football season. Led by Ted Jefferies in his ninth and final season as head coach, the Lumberjacks compiled an overall record of 5–4 with a mark of 2–4 in conference play, tying for fourth place in the LSC.

== Schedule ==
Date	Time	Opponent	Site	Result	Attendance	Source
September 24		Northeast Louisiana State*	Nacogdoches, TX	W 15–6		
October 1	8:15 p.m.	at Austin*	Bearcat Stadium; Sherman, TX	W 14–6		
October 8		at Lamar Tech	Greenie Stadium; Beaumont, TX	W 20–8		
October 15		at Texas Lutheran*	Seguin, TX	W 64–0		
October 22		Southwest Texas State	Nacogdoches, TX	L 20–26	7,000	
October 29		Texas A&I	Nacogdoches, TX	L 12–13		
November 5		at Sul Ross	Alpine, TX	W 13–0		
November 12		at East Texas State	Memorial Stadium; Commerce, TX	L 14–33		
November 19		Sam Houston State	Nacogdoches, TX (rivalry)	L 6–27		
*Non-conference game
