= 1948 Texas State Tigers football team =

American college football season

1948 Texas State Tigers football
- Conference: Independent
- Record: 0–8–1
- Head coach: Eolus Von Rettig (3rd season)
- Home stadium: Buffalo Stadium

1948 Southern non-major college football independents records
	Conf.			Overall
Team	W	L	T	W		L		T
Maryland State		–		7	–	1	–	0
Sewanee		–		6	–	1	–	1
Grambling		–		8	–	2	–	0
East Tennessee State		–		6	–	2	–	1
Delaware		–		5	–	3	–	0
Memphis State		–		6	–	5	–	0
Tennessee Tech		–		5	–	6	–	0
Oklahoma City		–		4	–	5	–	1
Marshall		–		2	–	7	–	1
Tampa		–		2	–	6	–	0
Texas State		–		0	–	8	–	1
CCUNC		–		0	–	5	–	0

The 1948 Texas State Tigers football team was an American football team that represented Texas State University for Negroes (now known as Texas Southern University) as an independent during the 1948 college football season. Led by third-year head coach Eolus Von Rettig, the Tigers compiled an overall record of 0–8–1.

== Schedule ==
Date	Opponent	Site	Result	Attendance	Source
September 18	at Wiley	Wildcat Stadium; Marshall, TX	T 6–6		
September 25	Southern	Buffalo Stadium; Houston, TX	L 0–38	3,000	
October 9	at Grambling	Tiger Stadium; Grambling, LA	L 0–61		
October 23	Samuel Huston	Buffalo Stadium; Houston, TX	L 14–25		
October 29	Prairie View A&M	Buffalo Stadium; Houston, TX (rivalry)	L 0–21		
November 6	Tillotson		L 0–27		
November 13	at Xavier (LA)	Xavier Stadium; New Orleans, LA	L 12–20		
November 20	at Texas College	Steer Stadium; Tyler, TX	L 0–21		
November 27	Langston	Buffalo Stadium; Houston, TX	L 0–40		
