= 1949 Tangerine Bowl =

American college football game

Murray State Thoroughbreds	Sul Ross Lobos
(9–1)	(10–0)
Ohio Valley Conference	New Mexico Intercollegiate Conference
21	21
Head coach: Fred Faurot	Head coach: Paul Pierce
	1	2	3	4	Total
Murray State	0	7	0	14	21
Sul Ross	7	14	0	0	21
- Date: January 1, 1949
- Season: 1948
- Stadium: Tangerine Bowl
- Location: Orlando, Florida
- MVP: Dale McDaniel, Murray State; Ted Scown, Sul Ross
- Attendance: 9,000

The 1949 Tangerine Bowl was an American college football bowl game played after the 1948 season, on January 1, 1949, at the Tangerine Bowl stadium in Orlando, Florida. The game was the third annual Tangerine Bowl, now known as the Citrus Bowl, and saw Murray State tie Sul Ross, 21–21. The game was the Tangerine Bowl's first tie; there would not be another tie until the 1954 Tangerine Bowl. This game was also the highest scoring tie in Tangerine Bowl history, throughout all name changes. This game was the first Tangerine Bowl where MVP honors were awarded; they were given to halfbacks Dale McDaniel of Murray State and Ted Scown of Sul Ross State.

== Game summary ==
The first quarter saw only seven points scored, as Ted Scown from Sul Ross found the end zone from 1 yard out. The second quarter featured half of the game's scoring; Sul Ross increased its lead with a 13-yard touchdown run followed by a 29-yard touchdown reception, both of these scores also being made by Scown. Murray State then fought back with an 85-yard kickoff return by Joe Bronson for a touchdown, and the game went to halftime 21–7. The third quarter was scoreless. In the fourth quarter, Dale McDaniels of Murray State scored two rushing touchdowns, one from 7 yards and the other from 36 yards. The game ended with the Lobos and Racers tied at 21.

== Scoring summary ==
Scoring summary

Quarter	Time	Drive			Team	Scoring information	Score	
Quarter	Time	Plays	Yards	TOP	Team	Scoring information	MS	SRS
1		3	1		SRS	Ted Scown 1-yard touchdown run, Frank Barton kick good	0	7
2					SRS	Ted Scown 13-yard touchdown run, Frank Barton kick good	0	14
2					SRS	Ted Scown 29-yard touchdown reception from Charles Laffoon, Frank Barton kick good	0	21
2					MS	Joe Bronson 85-yard kickoff return, Bob Sanders kick good	7	14
4			29		MS	Dale McDaniels 7-yard touchdown run, Bob Sanders kick good	14	21
4			45		MS	Dale McDaniels 36-yard touchdown run, Bob Sanders kick good	21	21
"TOP" = time of possession. For other American football terms, see Glossary of American football.							21	21
