= 1955 Lamar Tech Cardinals football team =

American college football season

1955 Lamar Tech Cardinals football
- Conference: Lone Star Conference
- Record: 4–6 (2–4 LSC)
- Head coach: James B. Higgins (3rd season)
- Home stadium: Greenie Stadium

1955 Lone Star Conference football standings
	Conf.					Overall
Team	W		L		T	W		L		T
Sam Houston State +	5	–	1	–	0	6	–	1	–	2
Southwest Texas State +	5	–	1	–	0	6	–	1	–	2
East Texas State +	5	–	1	–	0	5	–	4	–	1
Stephen F. Austin	2	–	4	–	0	5	–	4	–	0
Lamar Tech	2	–	4	–	0	4	–	6	–	0
Texas A&I	2	–	4	–	0	4	–	6	–	0
Sul Ross	0	–	6	–	0	2	–	8	–	0
+ – Conference co-champions

The 1955 Lamar Tech Cardinals football team was an American football team that represented Lamar State College of Technology—now known Lamar University–as a member of the Lone Star Conference (LSC) during the 1955 college football season. Led by third-year head coach James B. Higgins, the Cardinals compiled an overall record of 4–6 with a mark of 2–4 in conference play, tying for fourth place in the LSC.

== Schedule ==
Date	Opponent	Site	Result	Attendance	Source
September 17	Southwestern Louisiana*	Greenie Stadium; Beaumont, TX (rivalry)	W 19–6	5,000	
September 24	at Northwestern State*	Demon Stadium; Natchitoches, LA	L 6–7		
October 1	Corpus Christi*	Greenie Stadium; Beaumont, TX	W 29–2		
October 8	Stephen F. Austin	Greenie Stadium; Beaumont, TX	L 8–20		
October 15	at East Texas State	Memorial Stadium; Commerce, TX	L 7–33		
October 22	at Sam Houston State	Pritchett Field; Huntsville, TX	L 13–46		
October 29	at McNeese State*	Lake Charles, LA (rivalry)	L 2–17		
November 5	Southwest Texas State	Greenie Stadium; Beaumont, TX	L 7–14		
November 12	at Texas A&I	Javelina Stadium; Kingsville, TX	W 20–9		
November 19	Sul Ross^{†}	Greenie Stadium; Beaumont, TX	W 26–13		
*Non-conference game; ^{†}Homecoming
