= 1955 Southwest Texas State Bobcats football team =

American college football season

1955 Southwest Texas State Bobcats football

LSC co-champion
- Conference: Lone Star Conference
- Record: 6–1–2 (5–1 LSC)
- Head coach: R. W. Parker (2nd season)
- Captain: Johnny Faseler
- Home stadium: Evans Field

1955 Lone Star Conference football standings
| | Conf. | | | | | Overall |
| Team | W | | L | | T | W | | L | | T |
|---|---|---|---|---|---|---|---|---|---|---|
| Sam Houston State + | 5 | – | 1 | – | 0 | 6 | – | 1 | – | 2 |
| Southwest Texas State + | 5 | – | 1 | – | 0 | 6 | – | 1 | – | 2 |
| East Texas State + | 5 | – | 1 | – | 0 | 5 | – | 4 | – | 1 |
| Stephen F. Austin | 2 | – | 4 | – | 0 | 5 | – | 4 | – | 0 |
| Lamar Tech | 2 | – | 4 | – | 0 | 4 | – | 6 | – | 0 |
| Texas A&I | 2 | – | 4 | – | 0 | 4 | – | 6 | – | 0 |
| Sul Ross | 0 | – | 6 | – | 0 | 2 | – | 8 | – | 0 |
+ – Conference co-champions

The 1955 Southwest Texas State Bobcats football team was an American football team that represented Southwest Texas State Teachers College—now known as Texas State University–as a member of the Lone Star Conference (LSC) during the 1955 college football season. Led by second-year head coach R. W. Parker, the Bobcats compiled an overall record of 6–1–2 and a mark of 5–1 in conference play, sharing the LSC title with Sam Houston State and East Texas State. The team's captain was Johnny Faseler.

== Schedule ==
| Date | Opponent | Site | Result | Attendance | Source |
|---|---|---|---|---|---|
| September 17 | at Texas Lutheran* | Seguin, TX | W 47–6 | | |
| October 1 | Howard Payne* | Evans Field; San Marcos, TX | T 7–7 | 4,000 | |
| October 8 | Texas A&I | Evans Field; San Marcos, TX | W 26–21 | 5,500 | |
| October 15 | at Sul Ross | Jackson Field; Alpine, TX | W 53–0 | | |
| October 22 | at Stephen F. Austin | Nacogdoches, TX | W 26–20 | 7,000 | |
| October 29 | Abilene Christian* | Evans Field; San Marcos, TX | T 19–19 | | |
| November 5 | at Lamar Tech | Greenie Stadium; Beaumont, TX | W 14–7 | | |
| November 12 | Sam Houston State | Evans Field; San Marcos, TX (rivalry) | L 14–16 | 4,700 | |
| November 19 | East Texas State^{†} | Evans Field; San Marcos, TX | W 27–7 | 5,500 | |
*Non-conference game; ^{†}Homecoming
