= 1955 Northeast Louisiana State Indians football team =

American college football season

1955 Northeast Louisiana State Indians football
- Conference: Gulf States Conference
- Record: 4–6 (1–5 GSC)
- Head coach: Devone Payne (2nd season)
- Home stadium: Brown Stadium

1955 Gulf States Conference football standings
	Conf.					Overall
Team	W		L		T	W		L		T
Louisiana Tech $	6	–	0	–	0	9	–	1	–	0
McNeese State	5	–	1	–	0	7	–	1	–	1
Southeastern Louisiana	4	–	2	–	0	5	–	5	–	0
Southwestern Louisiana	3	–	3	–	0	5	–	4	–	0
Northwestern State	2	–	4	–	0	4	–	5	–	0
Northeast Louisiana State	1	–	5	–	0	4	–	6	–	0
Louisiana College	0	–	6	–	0	2	–	8	–	0
$ – Conference champion

The 1955 Northeast Louisiana State Indians football team was an American football team that represented Northeast Louisiana State College (now known as the University of Louisiana at Monroe) in the Gulf States Conference during the 1955 college football season. In their second year under head coach Devone Payne, the team compiled a 4–6 record.

== Schedule ==
Date	Opponent	Site	Result	Source
September 17	Southeastern Louisiana	Brown Stadium; Monroe, LA	L 0–40	
September 24	at Stephen F. Austin*	Memorial Stadium; Nacogdoches, TX	L 6–15	
October 1	Delta State*	Brown Stadium; Monroe, LA	W 7–0	
October 8	Southwestern Louisiana	Brown Stadium; Monroe, LA (rivalry)	L 6–26	
October 15	Western Kentucky*	Brown Stadium; Monroe, LA	W 21–9	
October 22	McNeese State	Brown Stadium; Monroe, LA	L 0–35	
October 29	Livingston State*	Brown Stadium; Monroe, LA	W 25–12	
November 5	at Northwestern State	Demon Stadium; Natchitoches, LA (rivalry)	L 7–28	
November 12	Louisiana College	Brown Stadium; Monroe, LA	W 14–7	
November 19	at Louisiana Tech	Tech Stadium; Ruston, LA (rivalry)	L 14–34	
*Non-conference game
