= Fred Faurot =

American football player and coach (1909–2000)

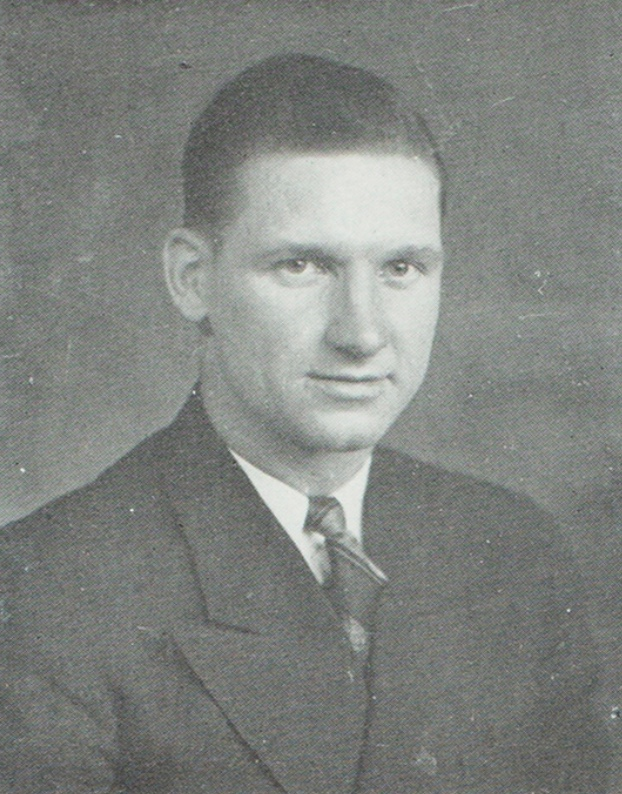
- Faurot from the 1936 Echo

Biographical details
- Born: March 18, 1909; Mountain Grove, Missouri, U.S.
- Died: December 12, 2000 (aged 91); Columbia, Missouri, U.S.

Playing career
- 1930, 1932: Missouri

Coaching career (HC unless noted)
- 1934: Chillicothe HS (MO)
- 1935–1937: Kirksville
- 1938–1941: Parsons
- 1946: Central (MO)
- 1948–1955: Murray State

Head coaching record
- Overall: 78–52–10 (college)
- Bowls: 0–0–1

Accomplishments and honors

Championships
- 2 MIAA (1935–1936); 3 OVC (1948, 1950–1951)

Frederick Winslow "Fritz" Faurot Jr. (March 18, 1909 – December 12, 2000) was an American football player and coach. He then served as the head football coach at Northeast Missouri State Teachers College—commonly known at the time as Kirksville State Teachers College and now known as Truman State University—from 1935 to 1937, Parsons College from 1938 to 1941, Central College—now known as Central Methodist University—in 1946, and Murray State University from 1948 to 1955, compiling a career college football coach record of 78–52–10. Faurot played college football at the University of Missouri, lettering in 1930 and 1932. He served as a lieutenant commander in the United States Navy, as an instructor in the physical training program, during World War II. He was the brother of College Football Hall of Fame coach, Don Faurot.

== Head coaching record ==
Year	Team	Overall	Conference	Standing	Bowl/playoffs
Kirksville Bulldogs (Missouri Intercollegiate Athletic Association) (1935–1937)
1935	Kirksville	7–1	5–0	1st	
1936	Kirksville	7–0	5–0	1st	
1937	Kirksville	1–4–2	1–2–2	4th	
Kirksville:		15–5–2	11–2–2		
Parsons Wildcats (Iowa Conference) (1938–1941)
1938	Parsons	2–4–2	2–3–1	8th	
1939	Parsons	5–3–1	3–2–1	T–5th	
1940	Parsons	4–4–1	3–3–1	T–6th	
1941	Parsons	5–4	4–3	5th	
Parsons:		16–15–4	12–11–3		
Central Eagles (Missouri College Athletic Union) (1946)
1946	Central	4–3–1	2–1–1	2nd	
Central:		4–3–1	2–1–1		
Murray State Thoroughbreds (Ohio Valley Conference) (1948–1955)
1948	Murray State	9–1–1	3–1	T–1st	T Tangerine
1949	Murray State	1–7–1	1–6	7th	
1950	Murray State	7–2–1	5–0–1	1st	
1951	Murray State	8–1	5–1	1st	
1952	Murray State	4–4	3–2	3rd	
1953	Murray State	3–6	1–4	5th	
1954	Murray State	5–4	3–2	T–2nd	
1955	Murray State	6–4	2–3	4th	
Murray State:		43–29–3	23–19–1		
Total:		78–52–10			
National championship Conference title Conference division title or championship game berth
