= 1948 East Tennessee State Buccaneers football team =

American college football season

1948 East Tennessee State Buccaneers football
- Conference: Independent
- Record: 6–2–1
- Head coach: Loyd Roberts (2nd season)
- Home stadium: State College Stadium, Memorial Stadium

1948 Southern non-major college football independents records
	Conf.			Overall
Team	W	L	T	W		L		T
Maryland State		–		7	–	1	–	0
Sewanee		–		6	–	1	–	1
Grambling		–		8	–	2	–	0
East Tennessee State		–		6	–	2	–	1
Delaware		–		5	–	3	–	0
Memphis State		–		6	–	5	–	0
Tennessee Tech		–		5	–	6	–	0
Oklahoma City		–		4	–	5	–	1
Marshall		–		2	–	7	–	1
Tampa		–		2	–	6	–	0
Texas State		–		0	–	8	–	1
CCUNC		–		0	–	5	–	0

The 1948 East Tennessee State Buccaneers football team was an American football team that represented East Tennessee State College (ETSC)—now known as East Tennessee State University—as an independent during the 1948 college football season. Led by second-year head coach Loyd Roberts, the Buccaneers compiled a record of 6–2–1.

The team received an increased budget of $8,050. Roberts hired Madison Brooks as line coach (and also as assistant director of athletics and head basketball coach) and Julian Doss Crocker as backfield coach and track mentor.

== Schedule ==
Date	Time	Opponent	Site	Result	Attendance	Source
September 25		at Tennessee Wesleyan	Athens, TN	W 20–18		
October 1	8:00 p.m.	at Erskine	McCants Stadium; Anderson, SC	L 8–13	2,500	
October 9		at Western Carolina	Cullowhee, NC	L 12–32	3,500	
October 16	8:00 p.m.	Maryville (TN)^{†}	State College Stadium; Johnson City, TN	W 20–0	3,250	
October 23		at Carson–Newman	Jefferson, TN	W 7–6	6,000	
October 28	8:00 p.m.	Middle Tennessee	State College Stadium; Johnson City, TN	W 2–0	3,000	
November 6	8:00 p.m.	Emory and Henry	State College Stadium; Johnson City, TN	W 15–6	4,000	
November 13	8:00 p.m.	at Tusculum	Burley Stadium; Greeneville, TN	W 14–0		
November 20	8:00 p.m.	Milligan	Memorial Stadium; Johnson City, TN	T 0–0	10,000	
^{†}Homecoming; All times are in Eastern time
