= 1948 Cal Aggies football team =

American college football season

1948 Cal Aggies football
- Conference: Far Western Conference
- Record: 5–4 (1–3 FWC)
- Head coach: Vern Hickey (9th season)
- Captain: Evert Schlinger
- Home stadium: A Street field

1948 Far Western Conference football standings
	Conf.					Overall
Team	W		L		T	W		L		T
Chico State +	3	–	1	–	0	5	–	3	–	0
Southern Oregon +	3	–	1	–	0	5	–	5	–	0
San Francisco State	2	–	2	–	0	3	–	5	–	0
Humboldt State	1	–	3	–	0	6	–	3	–	0
Cal Aggies	1	–	3	–	0	2	–	6	–	0
+ – Conference co-champions

The 1948 Cal Aggies football team represented the College of Agriculture at Davis—now known as the University of California, Davis—as a member of the Far Western Conference (FWC) during the 1948 college football season. Led by Vern Hickey in his ninth and final season as head coach, the Aggies compiled an overall record of 5–4 with a mark of 1–3 in conference play, tying for fourth place in the FWC. The team was outscored by its opponents 175 to 98 for the season. The Cal Aggies played home games at A Street field on campus in Davis, California.

In nine years under Hickey, the Cal Aggies compiled an overall record of 23–42–8, for a winning percentage of .370. The Aggies shared one conference title under Hickey, 1947.

== Schedule ==
Date	Opponent	Site	Result	Source
September 25	Fairfield-Suisun AAF (Note: Travis Air Force Base was known as Fairfield-Suisun Army Air Force Base from 1947 to 1951.)*	A Street field; Davis, CA	W 37–6	
October 2	Occidental*	A Street field; Davis, CA	L 0–28	
October 9	at Southern Oregon	Walter E. Phillips Field?; Ashland, OR	L 26–49	
October 16	at Chico State	Chico High School Stadium; Chico, CA	L 7–19	
October 23	Humboldt State	A Street field; Davis, CA	W 15–7	
October 30	San Francisco State	A Street field; Davis, CA	L 0–25	
November 6	vs. Santa Barbara (Note: The game against Santa Barbara was part of an "All-UC Doubleheader" that was held annually from 1948 to 1963. The other game of the double-header was California vs. UCLA. The games were always held at the home stadium of either Cal or UCLA.)*	California Memorial Stadium; Berkeley, CA	L 6–27	
November 13	at Whittier*	Hadley Field; Whittier, CA	L 7–14	
*Non-conference game
