= Fulton High School (Kentucky) =

Coordinates: 36.51°N 88.89°W

Location
- 700 Stephen Beale Drive; Fulton, (Fulton County), Kentucky 42041; United States

Information
- Type: Public high school
- School district: Fulton Public Schools
- Principal: Heath Cartwright
- Staff: 31.43 (FTE)
- Enrollment: 324 (2022-23)
- Student to teacher ratio: 10.31
- Colors: Blue and white
- Nickname: Bulldogs

Fulton High School is an independent high school in the Fulton Independent School district. It is located in Fulton, Kentucky, United States. The principal is Heath Cartright.
