= 1948 Tampa Spartans football team =

American college football season

1948 Tampa Spartans football
- Conference: Dixie Conference
- Record: 2–6 (1–1 Dixie)
- Head coach: Mike Gaddis (1st season)
- Home stadium: Phillips Field

1948 Dixie Conference football standings
	Conf.					Overall
Team	W		L		T	W		L		T
Florida State $	4	–	0	–	0	7	–	1	–	0
Mississippi College	2	–	1	–	0	4	–	5	–	0
Tampa	1	–	1	–	0	2	–	6	–	0
Stetson	1	–	3	–	0	2	–	7	–	0
Millsaps	0	–	3	–	0	2	–	3	–	1
$ – Conference champion

The 1948 Tampa Spartans football team represented the University of Tampa as a member of the Dixie Conference during the 1948 college football season. Led by Mike Gaddis in his first season as head coach, the Spartans compiled an overall record of 2–6 with a mark of 1–1 in conference play, and finished third in the Dixie Conference. The team played home games at Phillips Field in Tampa, Florida.

== Schedule ==
Date	Opponent	Site	Result	Attendance	Source
September 25	at Milligan*	Memorial Stadium; Johnson City, TN	L 13–20		
October 9	at Memphis State*	Crump Stadium; Memphis, TN	L 16–43		
October 22	Stetson	Phillips Field; Tampa, FL	W 24–13	6,500	
October 30	at Pensacola NAS*	NAS Gridiron; Pensacola, FL	L 32–37		
November 7	Heroico Colegio Militar*	Phillips Field; Tampa, FL	W 77–0	6,000	
November 19	Rollins*	Phillips Field; Tampa, FL	L 6–35		
November 25	at Erskine*	Memorial Stadium; Anderson, SC	L 0–34	3,000	
December 4	at Florida State	Centennial Field; Tallahassee, FL	L 12–33	7,000	
*Non-conference game
