= 1933 Kirksville Bulldogs football team =

College football season

1933 Kirksville Bulldogs football

MIAA champion
- Conference: Missouri Intercollegiate Athletic Association
- Record: 9–0 (4–0 MIAA)
- Head coach: Don Faurot (8th season)
- Home stadium: Stokes Stadium

1933 Missouri Intercollegiate Athletic Association football standings
| | Conf. | | | | | Overall |
| Team | W | | L | | T | W | | L | | T |
|---|---|---|---|---|---|---|---|---|---|---|
| Kirksville $ | 4 | – | 0 | – | 0 | 9 | – | 0 | – | 0 |
| Warrensburg | 3 | – | 1 | – | 0 | 6 | – | 3 | – | 0 |
| Cape Girardeau | 2 | – | 2 | – | 0 | 5 | – | 3 | – | 1 |
| Maryville (MO) | 1 | – | 3 | – | 0 | 1 | – | 8 | – | 0 |
| Springfield (MO) | 0 | – | 4 | – | 0 | 2 | – | 5 | – | 0 |
$ – Conference champion

The 1933 Kirksville Bulldogs football team represented the Kirksville State Teachers College (also known as Northeast Missouri State Teachers College, later renamed as Truman State University) as a member of the Missouri Intercollegiate Athletic Association (MIAA) during the 1933 college football season. In their eighth year under head coach Don Faurot, the Bulldogs compiled a 9–0 record (4–0 against conference opponents), won the MIAA championship, shut out five of nine opponents, and outscored all opponents by a total of 212 to 26.

The 1933 season was part of a 27-game winning streak that included three consecutive perfect seasons in 1932, 1933, and 1934.

The team played its home games at Stokes Stadium in Kirksville, Missouri.

== Schedule ==
| Date | Opponent | Site | Result | Attendance | Source |
|---|---|---|---|---|---|
| September 29 | Chillicothe* | Stokes Stadium; Kirksville, MO | W 19–0 | | |
| October 7 | at Missouri* | Memorial Stadium; Columbia, MO | W 26–6 | | |
| October 13 | Cape Girardeau | Stokes Stadium; Kirksville, MO | W 20–6 | | |
| October 20 | at Springfield (MO) | Springfield, MO | W 32–0 | | |
| October 27 | Warrensburg | Stokes Stadium; Kirksville, MO | W 33–7 | | |
| November 3 | Penn (IA)* | Stokes Stadium; Kirksville, MO | W 39–7 | | |
| November 11 | at Maryville | Maryville, MO | W 18–0 | | |
| November 17 | at Rolla* | Rolla, MO | W 18–0 | | |
| November 24 | at Pittsburg Teachers* | Pittsburg, KS | W 7–0 | | |
*Non-conference game
