= Lou Tsoutsouvas =

American football player and coach (1915–2001)

Biographical details
- Born: July 4, 1915; Fresno, California, U.S.
- Died: July 17, 2001 (aged 86); Santa Paula, California, U.S.

Playing career
- 1934–1937: Stanford
- 1938: Pittsburgh Steelers
- Position: Center

Coaching career (HC unless noted)
- 1941–1947: Ventura
- 1948: Humboldt State

Baseball
- 1949: Humboldt State

Head coaching record
- Overall: 6–3 (college); 14–13–1 (junior college)

Louis Samuel Tsoutsouvas (July 4, 1915 – July 17, 2001) was an American football player and coach. He served as the head football coach at Humboldt State College—now known as Humboldt State University—in 1948, compiling a record of 6–3. Tsoutsouvas was also the head football coach at Ventura College in Ventura, California from 1941 to 1947, amassing a record of 14–13–1.

== Head coaching record ==
Year	Team	Overall	Conference	Standing	Bowl/playoffs
Humboldt State Lumberjacks (Far Western Conference) (1948)
1948	Humboldt State	6–3	1–3	T–4th	
Humboldt State:		6–3	1–3		
Total:		6–3			

=== Junior college football ===
Year	Team	Overall	Conference	Standing	Bowl/playoffs
Ventura Pirates (Metropolitan Conference) (1941–1946)
1941	Ventura	6–4	4–2	2nd	
1942	No team—World War II				
1943	No team—World War II				
1944	No team—World War II				
1945	No team—World War II				
1946	Ventura	4–5–1	1–5–1	T–6th	
Ventura Pirates () (1947)
1947	Ventura	4–4			
Ventura:		14–13–1			
Total:		14–13–1			
