= Don Faurot =

American football and basketball player, coach and administrator

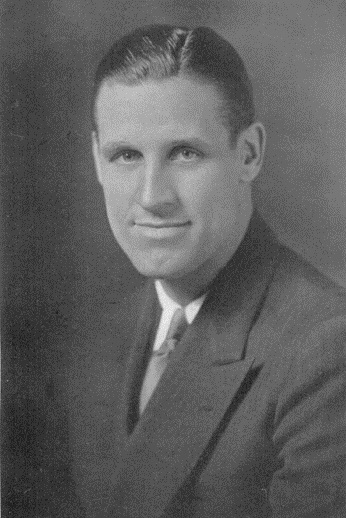
- Faurot from The Savitar, 1936

Biographical details
- Born: June 23, 1902; Mountain Grove, Missouri, U.S.
- Died: October 19, 1995 (aged 93); Columbia, Missouri, U.S.

Playing career

Football
- 1922–1924: Missouri
- Position: Halfback

Coaching career (HC unless noted)

Football
- 1926–1934: Kirksville
- 1935–1942: Missouri
- 1943: Iowa Pre-Flight
- 1944: Jacksonville NAS
- 1946–1956: Missouri

Basketball
- 1925–1934: Kirksville State

Administrative career (AD unless noted)
- 1935–1942: Missouri
- 1946–1967: Missouri

Head coaching record
- Overall: 177–96–13 (football); 92–74 (basketball)
- Bowls: 0–4

Accomplishments and honors

Championships
- Football; 7 MIAA (1927–1930, 1932–1934); 3 Big 6 (1939, 1941–1942) Basketball; 1 MIAA (1927)

Awards
- Amos Alonzo Stagg Award (1964)
- College Football Hall of Fame; Inducted in 1961 (profile)

Donald Burrows Faurot (June 23, 1902 – October 19, 1995) was an American football and basketball player, coach, and college athletics administrator best known for his eight-decade association with the University of Missouri. He served as the head football coach at Northeast Missouri State Teachers College—commonly known at the time as Kirksville State Teachers College and now known as Truman State University—from 1926 to 1934 and at Missouri from 1935 to 1942 and again from 1946 to 1956. During World War II, Faurot coached the Iowa Pre-Flight Seahawks in 1943 and the football team at Naval Air Station Jacksonville in 1944. He was also the head basketball coach at Kirksville State from 1925 to 1934, tallying a mark of 92–74. Faurot was the athletic director at Missouri from 1935 to 1942 and again from 1946 to 1967. He lettered in three sports at Missouri in the early 1920s: in football, as a halfback, basketball and baseball.

Faurot is credited with inventing the split-T formation. He was inducted into the College Football Hall of Fame as a coach in 1961. The playing surface at Missouri's Memorial Stadium was named Faurot Field in his honor in 1972.

== Early life and playing career ==
Faurot was born in Mountain Grove, Missouri, on June 23, 1902, to parents Frederick W. Faurot and Charlotte Burrows Faurot. He lost two fingers on his right hand in a boyhood farming accident, yet still became an accomplished multi-sport athlete.

Faurot's association with the University of Missouri started when he was a young boy who would sneak into Rollins Field to watch the Tigers play and practice. He was the eldest of four brothers to win a football letter at Missouri. Faurot was a three-sport letterman from 1922 to 1924. A lightweight 145-pound fullback in football, he also captained the basketball team and was an infielder in baseball. He was a member of FarmHouse fraternity while attending the University of Missouri.

== Coaching career ==
=== Kirksville State ===
After college, Faurot was appointed head coach at Kirksville State Teachers College (now Truman State University), where he spent nine years, from 1926 through 1934, with a record of 63 wins, 13 losses and 3 ties. From 1932 to 1934, his teams had a 26–0 record, the best small-college record in the country. During the run the team was the MIAA champion in 1927, 1928, 1929, 1930, 1932, 1933 and 1934. He also coached the basketball team to the 1927 MIAA championship. In 1933, he led KSTC to a 26–6 win against Missouri in Columbia. This win, along with his MIAA conference titles in 1933 and 1934 led to the offering of the head coaching position at Missouri following the 1934 season.

=== Missouri ===
Even while coaching at Kirksville State, Faurot remained close to Mizzou. As a graduate student in agriculture in 1926, Faurot helped lay the sod for Missouri's new Memorial Stadium in 1926. In 1935, Faurot returned to his alma mater as head coach and athletic director, titles he retained until 1956 except for three years of service in the United States Navy during World War II. At Missouri, he took over a team that had won only two games in three years and with the athletic program over $500,000 in debt.

His major contributions were two-fold: retiring the $500,000 debt through scheduling Ohio State over 9 of 11 years (losing all of them) and to football through his innovation of the Split-T offense at Mizzou in 1941. In the post-World War II era, many coaches adopted the Faurot formation—most notably, Bud Wilkinson and Jim Tatum, who learned the offense first-hand while serving as his assistant coaches with the Iowa Pre-Flight Seahawks during World War II. More than 60 years later, it is still in vogue today at all levels of football. Several of football's most notable formations—the Wishbone, Wingbone, Veer or I-attack and others—utilize Faurot's option play as their basic concept.

In 19 years as the Tiger football coach, Faurot's record was 101 wins, 79 losses and 10 ties, a record that remained unmatched until coach Gary Pinkel passed him in 2013. His 1939 team, featuring All-American Paul Christman, won Faurot's first Big Six Conference title and a bid to the Orange Bowl. His 1941 team also won the Big 6 title after a 45–6 drubbing of Kansas, and played in the Sugar Bowl. After a last-second win against arch-rival Kansas in 1956, he stepped down as head coach to concentrate on his duties as athletic director. Under him, the Tigers won three conference titles and went to four bowl games. When he retired as athletic director in 1967, the program was in the black and Memorial Stadium's capacity had doubled to more than 50,000 through five different expansions.

== Honors ==
Faurot is a member of the National Football Foundation's College Football Hall of Fame, the Missouri Sports Hall of Fame, the University of Missouri Intercollegiate Athletics Hall of Fame, the Orange Bowl Hall of Honor, the Blue-Gray Game Hall of Fame, past president of the American Football Coaches Association, and recipient of the Amos Alonzo Stagg Award for his distinguished service in the advancement of the best interests of football.

In 1972, the playing surface at Memorial Stadium was officially named Faurot Field in his honor.

Though he stepped down as athletic director in 1967, Faurot never really found a way to retire. He maintained an office at the Tom Taylor Building where he spent several hours nearly every day, and was a regular attendee at football practice until shortly before his death. In 1995, he placed the final square of sod as MU successfully converted Faurot Field back to natural grass. Through 1994, Faurot was active as a talent procurer and coach for the annual Blue–Gray Football Classic in Montgomery, Alabama. He was secretary of the Missouri Sports Hall of Fame for many years, and was also the executive secretary of the Missouri Senior Golf Association. He spent a term after his retirement as assistant director in charge of special events for the MU Alumni Association.

He died October 19, 1995, in Columbia, the week of the MU Homecoming. He was 93 years old. Apart from his stint in Kirksville and his wartime service, he spent all of his adult life associated with MU in some capacity.

== Head coaching record ==
=== Football ===
Year	Team	Overall	Conference	Standing	Bowl/playoffs	AP^{#}
Kirksville Bulldogs (Missouri Intercollegiate Athletic Association) (1926–1934)
1926	Kirksville	7–1	3–1	2nd		
1927	Kirksville	8–1	4–0	1st		
1928	Kirksville	7–2–1	3–0–1	T–1st		
1929	Kirksville	5–3–1	2–0–1	1st		
1930	Kirksville	5–5	3–0	1st		
1931	Kirksville	6–1–1	2–1–1	T–2nd		
1932	Kirksville	8–0	4–0	1st		
1933	Kirksville	9–0	4–0	1st		
1934	Kirksville	8–0	4–0	1st		
Kirksville:		63–13–3	29–2–3			
Missouri Tigers (Big Six Conference) (1935–1942)
1935	Missouri	3–3–3	0–2–3	6th		
1936	Missouri	6–2–1	3–1–1	2nd		
1937	Missouri	3–6–1	2–2–1	4th		
1938	Missouri	6–3	2–3	3rd		
1939	Missouri	8–2	5–0	1st	L Orange	6
1940	Missouri	6–3	3–2	3rd		
1941	Missouri	8–2	5–0	1st	L Sugar	7
1942	Missouri	8–3–1	4–0–1	1st		
Iowa Pre-Flight Seahawks (Independent) (1943)
1943	Iowa Pre-Flight	9–1				2
Iowa Pre-Flight:		9–1				
Jacksonville Naval Air Station Fliers (Independent) (1944)
1944	Jacksonville NAS	4–3				
Jacksonville NAS:		4–3				
Missouri Tigers (Big Six/Seven Conference) (1946–1956)
1946	Missouri	5–4–1	3–2	3rd		
1947	Missouri	6–4	3–2	3rd		
1948	Missouri	8–3	5–1	2nd	L Gator	
1949	Missouri	7–4	5–1	2nd	L Gator	20
1950	Missouri	4–5–1	3–2–1	3rd		
1951	Missouri	2–8	1–5	6th		
1952	Missouri	5–5	5–1	2nd		
1953	Missouri	6–4	4–2	T–2nd		
1954	Missouri	4–5–1	3–2–1	T–3rd		
1955	Missouri	1–9	1–5	7th		
1956	Missouri	4–5–1	3–2–1	3rd		
Missouri:		101–79–10	61–34–9			
Total:		177–96–13				
National championship Conference title Conference division title or championship game berth
^{#}Rankings from final AP Poll.

== See also ==
- List of presidents of the American Football Coaches Association
