= 1932 Kirksville Bulldogs football team =

College football season

1932 Kirksville Bulldogs football

MIAA champion
- Conference: Missouri Intercollegiate Athletic Association
- Record: 8–0 (4–0 MIAA)
- Head coach: Don Faurot (7th season)
- Home stadium: Stokes Stadium

1932 Missouri Intercollegiate Athletic Association football standings
	Conf.					Overall
Team	W		L		T	W		L		T
Kirksville $	4	–	0	–	0	8	–	0	–	0
Springfield (MO)	2	–	1	–	1	3	–	2	–	2
Maryville (MO)	2	–	2	–	0	4	–	4	–	1
Warrensburg	1	–	2	–	1	4	–	3	–	1
Cape Girardeau	0	–	4	–	0	2	–	6	–	1
$ – Conference champion

The 1932 Kirksville Bulldogs football team represented the Kirksville State Teachers College (also known as Northeast Missouri State Teachers College, later renamed as Truman State University) as a member of the Missouri Intercollegiate Athletic Association (MIAA) during the 1932 college football season. In their seventh year under head coach Don Faurot, the Bulldogs compiled an 8–0 record (4–0 against conference opponents), won the MIAA championship, shut out six of eight opponents, and outscored all opponents by a total of 132 to 14. The 1932 season was part of a 27-game winning streak that included three consecutive perfect seasons in 1932, 1933, and 1934.

Five Kirksville players were selected as first-team players on the 1932 MIAA all-star team selected by the conference coaches. The first-team honorees were Doyle at left end, Barton at left tackle, Curtright at left guard, Embree at quarterback, and Rhode at left halfback. Barton and Curtright were the only two unanimous choices. Four others were named to the second team: Scholle at center; Robinson at right guard; Hudson at right end; and Wade at right halfback.

The team played its home games at Stokes Stadium in Kirksville, Missouri.

== Schedule ==
Date	Opponent	Site	Result	Attendance	Source
September 30	at Chillicothe*	Chillicothe, MO	W 24–0		
October 7	Parsons*	Stokes Stadium; Kirksville, MO	W 19–0	2,000	
October 14	Springfield	Stokes Stadium; Kirksville, MO	W 31–7	3,000	
October 21	Rolla*	Stokes Stadium; Kirksville, MO	W 12–7	2,800	
October 28	Missouri "B" team*	Stokes Stadium; Kirksville, MO	W 20–0		
November 4	at Warrensburg	Warrensburg, MO	W 7–0		
November 11	Maryville	Stokes Stadium; Kirksville, MO	W 6–0		
November 18	at Cape Girardeau	Cape Girardeau, MO	W 13–0		
*Non-conference game
