= Fruit Bowl =

The Fruit Bowl was a postseason college football bowl game held in December at Kezar Stadium in San Francisco. The game was held three times, from 1947 to 1949. The first two games featured college teams and the last involved club teams.

The games were important due to the inclusion of schools that are considered historically black colleges and universities (HBCUs) in both the 1947 and 1948 games. The 1947 game featured two such schools, Wilberforce and Prairie View A&M. This was the first meeting of HBCUs in San Francisco. The 1948 game was the first inter-racial bowl game played in the United States—it featured Southern and San Francisco State.

== Game results (college games only) ==
Date	Winner		Loser		Ref
December 14, 1947	Wilberforce State	26	Prairie View A&M	0	
December 5, 1948	Southern	30	San Francisco State	0	

== See also ==
- List of college bowl games
