= 1948 Louisville Cardinals football team =

American college football season

1948 Louisville Cardinals football
- Conference: Ohio Valley Conference
- Record: 5–5 (1–1 OVC)
- Head coach: Frank Camp (3rd season)
- Home stadium: Parkway Field

1948 Ohio Valley Conference football standings
	Conf.					Overall
Team	W		L		T	W		L		T
Murray State +	3	–	1	–	0	9	–	1	–	1
Evansville +	3	–	1	–	0	6	–	3	–	0
Eastern Kentucky	2	–	2	–	0	8	–	3	–	0
Louisville	1	–	1	–	0	5	–	5	–	0
Western Kentucky	2	–	3	–	0	5	–	4	–	0
Morehead State	0	–	3	–	0	3	–	5	–	0
+ – Conference co-champions

The 1948 Louisville Cardinals football team was an American football team that represented the University of Louisville as a member of the Ohio Valley Conference (OVC) during the 1948 college football season. In their third season under head coach Frank Camp, the Cardinals compiled a 5–5 record.

Louisville was ranked at No. 180 in the final Litkenhous Difference by Score System ratings for 1948.

== Schedule ==
Date	Time	Opponent	Site	Result	Attendance	Source
September 25		at Memphis State*	Crump Stadium; Memphis, TN (rivalry)	L 7–13		
October 2		Saint Joseph's (IN)*	Parkway Field; Louisville, KY	W 20–0		
October 8		at Xavier*	Xavier Stadium; Cincinnati, OH	L 26–47	8,000	
October 16		at Akron*	Akron, OH	W 13–0		
October 23		Western Kentucky	Parkway Field; Louisville, KY	W 19–6		
October 30		Buffalo*^{†}	Parkway Field; Louisville, KY	L 19–48		
November 6		Catawba*	Parkway Field; Louisville, KY	W 33–21		
November 13		at Evansville	Evansville, IN	L 6–18		
November 20		Bradley*	Parkway Field; Louisville, KY	W 31–14		
November 27	2:00 p.m.	at Washington University*	Francis Field; St. Louis, MO	L 12–27	5,400	
*Non-conference game; ^{†}Homecoming; All times are in Central time; Source:
