= 1934 Kirksville Bulldogs football team =

College football season

1934 Kirksville Bulldogs football

MIAA champion
- Conference: Missouri Intercollegiate Athletic Association
- Record: 8–0 (4–0 MIAA)
- Head coach: Don Faurot (9th season)
- Home stadium: Stokes Stadium

1934 Missouri Intercollegiate Athletic Association football standings
| | Conf. | | | | | Overall |
| Team | W | | L | | T | W | | L | | T |
|---|---|---|---|---|---|---|---|---|---|---|
| Kirksville $ | 4 | – | 0 | – | 0 | 8 | – | 0 | – | 0 |
| Cape Girardeau | 3 | – | 1 | – | 0 | 8 | – | 1 | – | 0 |
| Maryville (MO) | 2 | – | 2 | – | 0 | 4 | – | 5 | – | 0 |
| Springfield (MO) | 1 | – | 3 | – | 0 | 1 | – | 5 | – | 1 |
| Warrensburg | 0 | – | 4 | – | 0 | 4 | – | 4 | – | 1 |
$ – Conference champion

The 1934 Kirksville Bulldogs football team represented the Kirksville State Teachers College (also known as Northeast Missouri State Teachers College, later renamed as Truman State University) as a member of the Missouri Intercollegiate Athletic Association (MIAA) during the 1934 college football season. In their ninth and final year under head coach Don Faurot, the Bulldogs compiled an 8–0 record (4–0 against conference opponents), won the MIAA championship, shut out six of eight opponents, and outscored all opponents by a total of 180 to 13.

The 1934 season was part of a 27-game winning streak that included three consecutive perfect seasons in 1932, 1933, and 1934. It was also Kirksville's seventh conference championship in nine years. Co-captain Arnold Embree was the team's leading scorer.

The team played its home games at Stokes Stadium in Kirksville, Missouri.

== Schedule ==
| Date | Opponent | Site | Result | Attendance | Source |
|---|---|---|---|---|---|
| September 28 | at Simpson* | Indianola, IA | W 7–0 | | |
| October 5 | Rolla* | Stokes Stadium; Kirksville, MO | W 19–0 | | |
| October 12 | Pittsburg Teachers* | Stokes Stadium; Kirksville, MO | W 13–7 | 3,200 | |
| October 19 | Springfield (MO) | Stokes Stadium; Kirksville, MO | W 52–0 | | |
| October 26 | at Warrensburg | Warrensburg, MO | W 24–6 | | |
| November 9 | Maryville (MO)^{†} | Stokes Stadium; Kirksville, MO | W 33–0 | | |
| November 16 | at Saint Louis* | Walsh Stadium; St. Louis, MO | W 19–0 | 10,000 | |
| November 23 | at Cape Girardeau | Houck Stadium; Cape Girardeau, MO | W 13–0 | 6,000 | |
*Non-conference game; ^{†}Homecoming
