= E.W. Grove Henry County High School =

- U.S. National Register of Historic Places
- Location within Tennessee Location within the United States
- Location: Grove Boulevard, Paris, Tennessee
- Coordinates: 36°17′34″N 88°19′45″W
- Built: 1906
- Architect: Reuben Harrison Hunt
- Architectural style: Romanesque, Classical Revival
- NRHP reference No.: 80003835
- Added to NRHP: November 25, 1980

The E.W. Grove Henry County High School building, also known as Grove Tower, is a historic building located on Grove Boulevard in Paris, Henry County, Tennessee. It is a "two story and basement building of gray pressed brick," the first of a few buildings comprising the Grove School campus. Grove High School was the first privately endowed public high school in Tennessee, opening in 1906. It was closed after graduating the class of 1969 and replaced by Henry County High School. The building was added to the National Register of Historic Places in 1980.

== Endowment and building ==
Edwin Wiley Grove, a former resident and businessman of Paris, Tennessee and formulator of Grove's Tasteless Chill Tonic, first offered to endow a public high school there on April 9, 1902. This offer stipulated that the county "establish and arrange for its maintenance." The Henry County Quarterly Court rejected this offer, citing the prevalence of smallpox in the county over the previous three years but "recognizing in it a high and philanthropic motive."

A second offer was made by Grove on July 3, 1905. Its terms stated that if the county and city would appropriate a sum of not less than $40,000 for the purposes of purchasing grounds, Grove would endow the school in the amount of $50,000 for the perpetual maintenance and operation. A board of trustees was further specified to handle the endowment. The court voted of 23 to 4 in favor of this offer.

Grove personally chose the site of the school on what was then known as Jernigan Heights, previously known as McCampbell's Hill, the highest point in west Tennessee. T. P. Jernigan, the land owner, donated the 17 and one half acres chosen. The county acquired further land adjoining the site at a cost of $4,650. The cornerstone was ceremoniously laid by the Paris Masonic Lodge on June 26, 1906. A bottle of Grove's Tasteless Chill Tonic was placed in inside.

Classes began in September 1906 in the library and council room of Paris City Hall until Christmas when Grove Tower building was finished.

Total expenditure in building the school was $46,400 paid in part by Henry county, the city of Paris and contributions from citizens. The building was designed by architect Reuben Harrison Hunt at a cost of $841.77. Joseph Tremby contracted for construction of the building, for which he was paid $28,946.89 and S. J. Veltman contracted for heating, plumbing and sewage for which he was paid $3,179.40, $1,459.60 and $525 respectively. Property for the school was a mix of donation and purchase at a cost of $4,650.00.

== History ==
Grove High School's first football team, the Chill Tonics, were coached by co-principal Dr. Clovis Chappell. Their uniforms were provided by E. W. Grove and Barton Field was donated by Col. O. C. Barton.

The first graduates of Grove High School were Louise Johnsonius and Fern Madole. They were awarded their diplomas on a Sunday night in 1908 at a tent revival held in Paris by Rev. Lynn Broughton.

By 1910, the school was reported to have 150 pupils. About $15,000 had been raised by that time with the interest of building a dormitory for girls. Cavitt Hall, a two-story and basement dormitory was completed by the summer of 1910 with contributions from E. W. Grove, Col. and Mrs. O. C. Barton, J. C. Rainey, A. H. Lankford and other citizens of Henry County. It was named for the family of Mrs. Barton. In 1924, it was converted to a home economics department and the basement continued to be used as a cafeteria until 1949.

In 1912, E. W. Grove began sending a regular payment of $150 to the principal with instructions that it be used to purchase fruit for the students. When the principal instead used it to improve the road leading up to the school, Grove stopped the payment.

Dudley M. Clements, a popular Grove teacher and County Demonstration Agent for Henry County, established the nation's first vocational agricultural program in 1917 under the Smith-Hughes Act. In 1919, he was appointed State Superintendent of Vocational Agriculture.

When Grove died in January 1927, his estate settled with the school's board of trust to make a final payment of $81,000 and terminate any regular monies paid as part of his original endowment.

Edwin Wiley Grove, Jr. took great interest in the school where his father left off. In 1931, he expressed the desire to memorialize his father by erecting several new buildings for manual training and commercial departments. His stipulation was that the county maintain the school as a "first class grade school." The county court minutes addressing this proposal estimate maintenance between $3,000 and $4,000 per year and, despite the bad economic condition of the county at the time, the proposal was accepted. Grove made other contributions for the beautification of the campus and for the endeavors of the Parent Teacher Association. After the death of E. W. Grove, Jr. in May 1934, a building was completed in 1937 designed as a gymnasium with rooms for manual training and commercial shops. Funds and labor were furnished by the Federal Emergency Administration of Public Works.

The estate of E. W. Grove, Jr. paid $10,000 to the Henry County Board of Education in 1940 for the benefit of Grove High School. Of this, $4,000 was used to repair Cavitt Hall after it burned on January 27, 1943, and the remaining funds were used to install lights and hardwood floors in the Grove Tower building.

Weston Hall was completed in 1949 after the Tennessee State Board of Education issued an emergency warning that building facilities at Grove High School were inadequate for the enrollment. It was named for A. S. Weston, a teacher who served for 26 years at Grove High School before his death in 1946.

At Barton Field, a stadium was built in 1948 and a field house was built in 1954.

A new wing on the west side of Weston Hall was built in 1958 to house Grove Junior High School. Grades seven through nine were held there until 1979 when Grove Middle School took on grades seven and eight.

In 1969, the last class was graduated at E. W. Grove High School. It was replaced, along with a handful of other rural high schools in Henry County, by Henry County High School. Grove Junior High School remained on the campus.

After years of deterioration, Cavitt Hall was demolished in 1985. The Grove Tower building was saved from demolition in 1986 and became the home of the Henry County Board of Education. It had been vacant since 1983.

E. W. Grove School became the first stand-alone ninth grade school in the country in 1996.

A Centennial celebration was held on June 24, 2006, including a re-enactment of the cornerstone placement, speeches and a wreath-laying ceremony at the grave of E. W. Grove, Sr. In attendance was James Grove Jr., great-grandson of E. W. Grove.
