= 1948 Western Kentucky Hilltoppers football team =

American college football season

1948 Western Kentucky Hilltoppers football
- Conference: Ohio Valley Conference
- Record: 5–4 (2–3 OVC)
- Head coach: Jack Clayton (1st season)

1948 Ohio Valley Conference football standings
	Conf.					Overall
Team	W		L		T	W		L		T
Murray State +	3	–	1	–	0	9	–	1	–	1
Evansville +	3	–	1	–	0	6	–	3	–	0
Eastern Kentucky	2	–	2	–	0	8	–	3	–	0
Louisville	1	–	1	–	0	5	–	5	–	0
Western Kentucky	2	–	3	–	0	5	–	4	–	0
Morehead State	0	–	3	–	0	3	–	5	–	0
+ – Conference co-champions

The 1948 Western Kentucky Hilltoppers football team represented Western Kentucky State College (now known as Western Kentucky University) as a member of the Ohio Valley Conference (OVC) during the 1948 college football season. Led by first-year head coach Jack Clayton, the Hilltoppers compiled an overall record of 5–4 with a mark of 2–3 in conference play, placing fifth in the OVC.

Western Kentucky was ranked at No. 230 in the final Litkenhous Difference by Score System ratings for 1948.

== Schedule ==
Date	Opponent	Site	Result	Attendance	Source
September 25	at Evansville	Bosse Stadium; Evansville, IN	L 6–12		
October 4	at Arkansas State*	Kays Stadium; Jonesboro, AR	L 12–13		
October 9	at Morehead State	Morehead, KY	W 19–14		
October 16	Union (TN)*	Bowling Green, KY	W 20–7		
October 23	at Louisville	Parkway Field; Louisville, KY	L 6–20		
October 30	Georgetown (KY)*	Bowling Green, KY	W 33–0		
November 6	Louisiana College*	Bowling Green, KY	W 35–18		
November 13	Eastern Kentucky^{†}	Bowling Green, KY (rivalry)	W 14–13		
November 25	Murray State	Bowling Green, KY (rivalry)	L 7–34		
*Non-conference game; ^{†}Homecoming
