= 1948 Murray State Thoroughbreds football team =

American college football season

1948 Murray State Thoroughbreds football

OVC co-champion

Tangerine Bowl, T 21–21 vs. Sul Ross
- Conference: Ohio Valley Conference
- Record: 9–1–1 (3–1 OVC)
- Head coach: Fred Faurot (1st season)

1948 Ohio Valley Conference football standings
	Conf.					Overall
Team	W		L		T	W		L		T
Murray State +	3	–	1	–	0	9	–	1	–	1
Evansville +	3	–	1	–	0	6	–	3	–	0
Eastern Kentucky	2	–	2	–	0	8	–	3	–	0
Louisville	1	–	1	–	0	5	–	5	–	0
Western Kentucky	2	–	3	–	0	5	–	4	–	0
Morehead State	0	–	3	–	0	3	–	5	–	0
+ – Conference co-champions

The 1948 Murray State Thoroughbreds football team represented Murray State College—now known as Murray State University—as a member of the newly formed Ohio Valley Conference (OVC) during the 1948 college football season. In their first season under head coach Fred Faurot, the Thoroughbreds compiled an overall record of 9–1–1 record with a 3–1 mark against conference opponents, sharing the OVC title with Evansville, and outscored their opponents by a total of 290 to 87. Murray State was invited to the 1949 Tangerine Bowl, where they tied undefeated Sul Ross.

Murray State was ranked at No. 107 in the final Litkenhous Difference by Score System ratings for 1948.

== Schedule ==
Date	Opponent	Site	Result	Attendance	Source
September 24	Culver–Stockton*	Murray, KY	W 40–13		
October 1	at Memphis State*	Crump Stadium; Memphis, TN	W 26–14		
October 9	at Eastern Kentucky	Richmond, KY	L 0–6		
October 15	Marshall*	Murray, KY	W 27–0		
October 22	at Southeast Missouri State*	Cape Girardeau, MO	W 40–0		
October 30	Tennessee Tech*	Murray, KY	W 34–6		
November 5	Morehead State	Murray, KY	W 33–0		
November 11	at Middle Tennessee*	Murfreesboro, TN	W 26–13		
November 19	Evansville	Murray, KY	W 9–7		
November 25	at Western Kentucky	Bowling Green, KY (rivalry)	W 34–7		
January 1, 1949	vs. Sul Ross*	Tangerine Bowl; Orlando, FL (Tangerine Bowl)	T 21–21	8,000	
*Non-conference game
