= List of SMU Mustangs football seasons =

The SMU Mustangs are an intercollegiate football team representing Southern Methodist University (SMU) in the Division I Football Bowl Subdivision (FBS) of the National Collegiate Athletic Association (NCAA). Since the 2013 college football season, the Mustangs compete in the American Athletic Conference but starting in 2024 now compete in the Atlantic Coast Conference. SMU began playing football in 1915 and has played their home games since 1999 at Gerald J. Ford Stadium on the SMU campus in University Park, Texas, an enclave of Dallas.

== Seasons ==
Year	Coach	Overall	Conference	Standing	Bowl/playoffs	Coaches^{#}	AP^{°}
Ray Morrison (Texas Intercollegiate Athletic Association) (1915–1916)
1915	SMU	2–5					
1916	SMU	0–8–2					
J. Burton Rix (Texas Intercollegiate Athletic Association) (1917)
1917	SMU	3–2–3					
J. Burton Rix (Southwest Conference) (1918–1921)
1918	SMU	4–2	1–2	5th			
1919	SMU	5–4–1	0–2–1	6th			
1920	SMU	3–5–2	0–4–1	6th			
1921	SMU (Note: Rix served as SMU's head coach for the first two games of the season before resigning. Bill Cunningham led the team as interim head coach for the final six games. The Mustangs compiled an overall record of 1–6–1 with marks of 0–4 in Southwest Conference play and 1–3–1 against Texas Intercollegiate Athletic Association opponents, placing seventh in both conferences.)	1–6–1	0–4	7th			
Ray Morrison & Ewing Y. Freeland (Southwest Conference) (1922–1923)
1922	SMU	6–3–1	2–2	T–3rd			
1923	SMU	9–0	5–0	1st			
Ray Morrison (Southwest Conference) (1924–1934)
1924	SMU	5–1–4	2–0–4	2nd	L Dixie Classic		
1925	SMU	5–2–2	1–1–2	4th			
1926	SMU	8–0–1	5–0	1st			
1927	SMU	7–2	4–1	2nd			
1928	SMU	6–3–1	2–2–1	5th			
1929	SMU	6–0–4	3–0–2	2nd			
1930	SMU	6–3–1	2–2–1	T–4th			
1931	SMU	9–1–1	5–0–1	1st			
1932	SMU	3–7–2	1–4–1	T–5th			
1933	SMU	4–7–1	2–4	6th			
1934	SMU	8–2–2	3–2–1	3rd			
Matty Bell (Southwest Conference) (1935–1941)
1935	SMU	12–1	6–0	1st	L Rose		
1936	SMU	5–4–1	2–3–1	5th			
1937	SMU	5–6	2–4	6th			
1938	SMU	6–4	4–2	2nd			
1939	SMU	6–3–1	4–2	T–2nd			
1940	SMU	8–1–1	5–1	T–1st			16
1941	SMU	5–5	2–4	5th			
Jimmy Stewart (Southwest Conference) (1942–1944)
1942	SMU	3–6–2	1–4–1	6th			
1943	SMU	2–7	2–3	T–3rd			
1944	SMU	5–5	2–3	T–4th			
Matty Bell (Southwest Conference) (1945–1949)
1945	SMU	5–6	4–2	2nd			
1946	SMU	4–5–1	2–4	T–5th			
1947	SMU	9–0–2	5–0–1	1st	T Cotton		3
1948	SMU	9–1–1	5–0–1	1st	W Cotton		10
1949	SMU	5–4–1	2–3–1	5th			
Rusty Russell (Southwest Conference) (1950–1952)
1950	SMU	6–4	2–4	T–5th			
1951	SMU	3–6–1	1–4–1	7th			
1952	SMU	4–5–1	3–2–1	3rd			
Woody Woodard (Southwest Conference) (1953–1956)
1953	SMU	5–5	3–3	4th			
1954	SMU	6–3–1	4–1–1	2nd		17	
1955	SMU	4–6	2–4	T–5th			
1956	SMU	4–6	2–4	5th			
Bill Meek (Southwest Conference) (1957–1961)
1957	SMU	4–5–1	3–3	4th			
1958	SMU	6–4	4–2	T–2nd			
1959	SMU	5–4–1	2–3–1	4th			
1960	SMU	0–9–1	0–6–1	8th			
1961	SMU	2–7–1	1–5–1	8th			
Hayden Fry (Southwest Conference) (1962–1972)
1962	SMU	2–8	2–5	7th			
1963	SMU	4–7	2–5	T–6th	L Sun		
1964	SMU	1–9	0–7	8th			
1965	SMU	4–5–1	3–4	T–4th			
1966	SMU	8–3	6–1	1st	L Cotton	9	10
1967	SMU	3–7	3–4	6th			
1968	SMU	8–3	5–2	3rd	W Astro-Bluebonnet	16	14
1969	SMU	3–7	3–4	5th			
1970	SMU	5–6	3–4	T–4th			
1971	SMU	4–7	3–4	5th			
1972	SMU	7–4	4–3	T–2nd			
Dave Smith (Southwest Conference) (1973–1975)
1973	SMU	6–4–1	3–3–1	T–4th			
1974	SMU	6–4–1	3–3–1	T–4th			
1975	SMU	4–7	2–5	T–5th			
Ron Meyer (Southwest Conference) (1976–1981)
1976	SMU	3–8	2–6	T–7th			
1977	SMU	4–7	3–5	T–6th			
1978	SMU	4–6–1	3–5	T–6th			
1979	SMU	5–6	3–5	6th			
1980	SMU	8–4	5–3	T–2nd	L Holiday	20	20
1981	SMU	10–1	7–1	1st	Ineligible (Note: The Mustangs had been put on probation by the NCAA for recruiting violations and were banned from participating in any bowl game in 1981. Because its rules prevent schools under probation from being considered, the Mustangs were not ranked in the Coaches Poll at all during the season. At season's end, the Mustangs were recognized as one of five co-national champions by the National Championship Foundation (NCF).)		5
Bobby Collins (Southwest Conference) (1982–1986)
1982	SMU	11–0–1	7–0–1	1st	W Cotton	2	2
1983	SMU	10–2	7–1	2nd	L Sun	11	12
1984	SMU	10–2	6–2	T–1st	W Aloha	8	8
1985	SMU	6–5	5–3	5th			
1986	SMU	6–5	5–3	T–4th			
1987	(Note: Southern Methodist University football scandal led to the death penalty for 1987 and 1988 seasons in which SMU was barred from fielding teams.)						
1988							
Forrest Gregg (Southwest Conference) (1989–1990)
1989	SMU	2–9	0–8	9th			
1990	SMU	1–10	0–8	9th			
Tom Rossley (Southwest Conference) (1991–1995)
1991	SMU	1–10	0–8	9th			
1992	SMU	5–6	2–5	T–6th			
1993	SMU	2–7–2	1–5–1	T–7th			
1994	SMU	1–9–1	0–6–1	8th			
1995	SMU	1–10	0–7	8th			
Tom Rossley (Western Athletic Conference) (1996)
1996	SMU	5–6	4–4	4th (Mountain)			
Mike Cavan (Western Athletic Conference) (1997–2001)
1997	SMU	6–5	5–3	T–2nd (Mountain)			
1998	SMU	5–7 (Note: Due to NCAA sanctions, SMU had 4 regular season wins and 6 regular season losses vacated for the 1998 season. SMU's pre-sanctions record was 5–7 (4–4 WAC). The "official" record now is 1–1 (0-1 WAC).)	4–4	T–5th (Mountain)			
1999	SMU	4–6	3–3	5th			
2000	SMU	3–9	2–6	T–6th			
2001	SMU	4–7	4–3	5th			
Phil Bennett (Western Athletic Conference) (2002–2004)
2002	SMU	3–9	3–5	T–6th			
2003	SMU	0–12	0–8	10th			
2004	SMU	3–8	3–5	T–6th			
Phil Bennett (Conference USA) (2005–2007)
2005	SMU	5–6	4–4	T–3rd (West)			
2006	SMU	6–6	4–4	4th (West)			
2007	SMU	1–11	0–8	6th (West)			
June Jones (Conference USA) (2008–2012)
2008	SMU	1–11	0–8	6th (West)			
2009	SMU	8–5	6–2	T–1st (West)	W Hawaii		
2010	SMU	7–7	6–2	T–1st (West)	L Armed Forces		
2011	SMU	8–5	5–3	3rd (West)	W BBVA Compass		
2012	SMU	7–6	5–3	2nd (West)	W Hawaii		
June Jones (American Athletic Conference) (2013–2014)
2013	SMU	5–7	4–4	5th			
2014	SMU (Note: Resigned on September 8, 2014. Defensive coordinator Tom Mason served as interim head coach for the final 10 games of the season.)	1–11	1–7	11th			
Chad Morris (American Athletic Conference) (2015–2017)
2015	SMU	2–10	1–7	T–5th (West)			
2016	SMU	5–7	3–5	5th (West)			
2017	SMU (Note: Morris served as SMU's head coach for the 2017 regular season before resigning to take the head coaching job at the University of Arkansas. Sonny Dykes coached the Mustangs in the 2017 Frisco Bowl. SMU finished the season with an overall record of 7–6.)	7–6	4–4	T–3rd (West)	L Frisco		
Sonny Dykes (American Athletic Conference) (2017–2021)
2018	SMU	5–7	4–4	4th (West)			
2019	SMU	10–3	6–2	3rd (West)	L Boca Raton		
2020	SMU	7–3	4–3	5th	CX Frisco (Note: The 2020 Frisco Bowl was cancelled due to COVID-19 issues and ruled a no contest.)		
2021	SMU	8–4	4–4	6th	CX Fenway (Note: Dykes served as SMU's head coach for the 2021 regular season, before leaving to take the head coaching job at Texas Christian University. Jim Leavitt was appointed interim head coach for the 2021 Fenway Bowl, however, the game was cancelled.)		
Rhett Lashlee (American Athletic Conference) (2022–2024)
2022	SMU	7–6	5–3	T–4th	L New Mexico		
2023	SMU	11–3	8–0	1st	L Fenway	24	22
Rhett Lashlee (Atlantic Coast Conference) (2024–present)
2024	SMU	11–3	8–0	1st	L CFP First Round^{†}	11	12
2025	SMU	9–4	6–2		W Holiday		
2026	SMU						
Total:		555–572–54					
National championship Conference title Conference division title or championship game berth
^{†}Indicates Bowl Coalition, Bowl Alliance, BCS, or CFP / New Years' Six bowl.; ^{#}Rankings from final Coaches Poll.
