= List of SMU Mustangs bowl games =

The SMU Mustangs college football team competes in the National Collegiate Athletic Association (NCAA) Division I Football Bowl Subdivision, representing Southern Methodist University in the West Division of the American Athletic Conference. Since the team's inaugural season in 1915, SMU has appeared in 17 post-season bowl games.

In the 17 bowl appearances, SMU has accumulated a record of 7 wins, 9 losses, and 1 tie.

After finishing the 2020 regular season with a 7–3 record, the Mustangs accepted a bid to play in the Frisco Bowl, where they were due to face the UTSA Roadrunners. On December 14, the Mustangs withdrew from the game, due to COVID-19 issues; the bowl was subsequently canceled.

After finishing the 2021 regular season with an 8–4 record, the Mustangs accepted a bid to play in the Fenway Bowl, where they were due to face the Virginia Cavaliers. On December 26, the Cavaliers withdrew from the game, due to COVID-19 issues; the bowl was subsequently canceled.

== Bowl appearances ==
Season	Year	Bowl Game	Opponent	W/L	PF	PA
1924	1925	Dixie Classic	West Virginia Wesleyan	L	7	9
1935	1936	Rose Bowl	Stanford	L	0	7
1947	1948	Cotton Bowl Classic	Penn State	T	13	13
1948	1949	Cotton Bowl Classic	Oregon	W	21	13
1963	1963	Sun Bowl	Oregon	L	14	21
1966	1966	Cotton Bowl Classic	Georgia	L	9	24
1968	1968	Bluebonnet Bowl	Oklahoma	W	28	27
1980	1980	Holiday Bowl	BYU	L	45	46
1982	1983	Cotton Bowl Classic	Pittsburgh	W	7	3
1983	1983	Sun Bowl	Alabama	L	7	28
1984	1984	Aloha Bowl	Notre Dame	W	27	20
2009	2009	Hawaiʻi Bowl	Nevada	W	45	10
2010	2010	Armed Forces Bowl	Army	L	14	16
2011	2012	BBVA Compass Bowl	Pittsburgh	W	28	6
2012	2012	Hawaiʻi Bowl	Fresno State	W	43	10
2017	2017	Frisco Bowl	Louisiana Tech	L	10	51
2019	2019	Boca Raton Bowl	Florida Atlantic	L	28	52
2020	2020	~~Frisco Bowl~~	~~UTSA~~	Canceled		
2021	2021	~~Fenway Bowl~~	~~UVA~~	Canceled		
2022	2022	New Mexico Bowl	BYU	L	23	24
2023	2023	Fenway Bowl	Boston College	L	14	23
2025	2025	Holiday Bowl	Arizona	W	24	19
