= SMU Mustangs football scandal =

Cheating by the SMU Mustangs football program

The Southern Methodist University football scandal occurred in 1987 when the SMU Mustangs football program at Southern Methodist University (SMU) was investigated and penalized by the National Collegiate Athletic Association (NCAA) for massive violations of rules and regulations over a period of several years between the late 1970s and mid-1980s. The most serious violation was the maintenance of a large slush fund used for "under the table" payments to players and their families to entice them to come to SMU to play from the early 1970s onward.

In early 1987, the NCAA investigated SMU's football program for these and other violations, and imposed what is referred to as the "death penalty"—banning a team from competition for a year or more. While it was not the only SWC school to be sanctioned—at one point, five of the conference's nine member schools were on some form of probation—SMU's violations were considered to be particularly egregious. The severity of the sanctions the NCAA imposed in this case, while based on the number and seriousness of SMU's infractions, especially took into account the school's blatant disregard for previous efforts at enforcement; the university had been under nearly constant NCAA scrutiny for over a decade.

The NCAA canceled SMU's 1987 season, the first time it had canceled a member's entire football season. The university opted to sit out the 1988 season as well due to concerns it would be unable to field a competitive team. The two-year hiatus had long-term effects on the program and ultimately led to the dissolution of the Southwest Conference.

== Background ==
SMU, located in suburban Dallas, Texas, was the second-smallest school in the Southwest Conference (SWC) (only Rice was smaller) and one of the smallest in Division I-A, with a total enrollment of just over 9,000 students in 1986. From the 1950s onward, the team had found it difficult to compete against SWC schools that were double its size or more. As the 1980 season began, SMU had had only nine winning seasons since 1951, including the last five in a row.

As they increased their efforts to keep up with the bigger schools, SMU's coaches and athletic staff began using recruiting methods that strayed very close to the ethical line, and in some cases went over it. Schools in the NCAA were prohibited from paying a player to join or play for their team, and all players were required to remain bona fide students at their institutions. According to ESPN's 2010 documentary film Pony Excess, much of the cheating took place with the full knowledge of school administrators.

These practices landed SMU on probation five times between 1974 and 1985. By 1987, it had been on probation seven times overall—more than any other school in Division I-A.

== The scandal ==
=== Beginnings under Ron Meyer ===
In the winter of 1975, SMU hired Ron Meyer, an up-and-coming football coach who had previous success with the UNLV Rebels. In the late 1970s, attention around SMU football grew, and in the 1978 offseason the university launched a media campaign which caused its average home attendance to double from 26,000 to 52,000. Even as attendance grew, however, SMU's win‍–‍loss record was not significantly improving; through Meyer's first four years there, the team's record was 16‍–‍27 and they had not had a winning season. Reasoning that the team still lacked talent and size, he turned more of his attention to recruiting the biggest and best new players he could get. His first major find had been running back Emanuel Tolbert from Little Rock Central High School. While trying to keep his dealings quiet, Meyer began persuading more and more big, talented players to commit to SMU. Former Mustangs quarterback Lance McIlhenny later referred to Meyer as the greatest salesman he had ever met.

Meyer's recruiting strategy was very aggressive, pursuing the best football players from across Texas and beyond, but his methods were not always ethical; he and his staff were paying recruits. According to Steve Endicott, the first payments came at Kashmere High School: "[...] It was Ron, Myself, Rob [Robin Buddecke, Endicott's assistant], and maybe another coach... I can't pin it down; it was maybe twenty or fifty bucks or something like that we gave". The Kashmere football players called the SMU recruiters "Santa Claus". The payments of $20 or $50 grew into $500, and escalated to the point that Buddecke was said to have handed out 100-dollar bills to recruits when meeting them at airports.

For years after this, new recruits—and existing players as well—continued to receive payments and gifts from SMU boosters. One such player was running back Reggie Dupard, who was selected in the first round of the 1986 NFL draft; he admitted to receiving sums of money and a car from a booster while playing at the school. In a 2022 interview, McIlhenny said that he had once confronted his coach about other players receiving envelopes of cash, and the next day discovered US$700 (equivalent to $2,335 in 2025) in his locker.

Meyer's recruiting strategies began to reflect on the scoreboard in 1980, when the Mustangs qualified for their first bowl game since 1968 with a high-powered running offense led by running backs Craig James and Eric Dickerson, the latter of whom had allegedly received a new gold Pontiac Trans Am as part of his initial recruitment to Texas A&M before flipping his commitment to SMU. (Note: The vehicle had actually been arranged for by boosters seeking to influence Dickerson to attend Texas A&M, to which he briefly committed before flipping to SMU.) Facing BYU in the 1980 Holiday Bowl, SMU fell 46‍–‍45 despite having led by three touchdowns late in the fourth quarter.

When the NCAA became aware of the payments, SMU was placed on probation and excluded from bowl games and television for a year; under these conditions, the team won the SWC championship and was ranked fifth in the AP final poll. Meyer resigned following the season to become head coach of the NFL's New England Patriots.

=== Escalation under Bobby Collins ===
Meyer's successor, Bobby Collins, continued making under-the-table payments to players despite probation, and the 1982 Mustangs finished unbeaten and won the 1983 Cotton Bowl Classic on their way to a #2 finish in the final polls. Only a tie against Arkansas denied them a share of the national championship. Collins led SMU to bowl appearances in his next two seasons, a loss in the 1983 Sun Bowl and a win in the 1984 Aloha Bowl; the Mustangs won a share of the SWC championship in the latter year, to earn their third conference championship in four years.

SMU's next probation came as the result of an investigation into the recruiting practices of several assistant coaches and boosters. Offensive lineman Sean Stopperich, who was part of the 1983 recruiting class and who had given an oral commitment to the Pittsburgh Panthers, told NCAA investigators that SMU boosters and assistant coaches had given him and his family several thousand dollars to renege on his Pittsburgh commitment and sign with the Mustangs instead.

The NCAA came down significantly harder on SMU than it had in the past. The school was not allowed to grant any new football scholarships for the 1985 season, and limited to fifteen for 1986. The Mustangs were also barred from postseason play for two seasons and banned from live television for 1986.

The Mustangs' on-field performance almost immediately suffered. Entering 1985 as the third-ranked team by the AP, SMU fell to No. 16 in the poll following a surprising blowout loss to unranked Arizona, and then fell out of the rankings altogether the next week after losing to conference rival Baylor. Losses to Arkansas, Texas A&M and Oklahoma followed, with the team finishing 6‍–‍5 for the year. The team failed to improve in 1986; a 5‍–‍1 start was followed by a three-game losing streak, and SMU again finished at 6‍–‍5 despite breaking into the top 20 of the AP at midseason and getting as high as #18. Their losses included a shutout against Arizona State, giving up 61 points against Notre Dame, and a second shutout in the season finale against Arkansas.

=== Repeat Violator rule ===
In 1985, after SMU was sanctioned again, the NCAA called an emergency meeting in New Orleans to deal with the rash of cheating that had been uncovered in the late 1970s and early 1980s. At that meeting, the NCAA Council implemented several new rules to combat the problem. Among the decisions made at that meeting was one that reinforced the NCAA's power to shut down athletic programs found guilty of egregious violations—a power popularly known as the "death penalty". The new bylaw, called the "Repeat Violator rule", stated that if a school had been found guilty of two major violations within five years, it could be barred for up to two years from competing in the sport involved in the second violation. The NCAA had only canceled a team's season twice in its history—Kentucky men's basketball in 1952‍–‍53 and Southwestern Louisiana men's basketball from 1973 to 1975. Though the "death penalty" had always been an option available to the NCAA, the new rule clarified its use and in some cases changed the way it would be applied. Once a school qualified as a repeat violator, the NCAA could no longer postpone judgment; it had to either hand down the penalty or explain why it was choosing not to do so.

Six schools on the council voted against adding the Repeat Violator rule. SMU was one of them; two of their SWC brethren, Texas and Houston, joined in dissenting. Both of those schools had also recently been under NCAA investigation for improper practices, with Texas having been cited for recruiting violations in 1982 and being caught for the same thing again in 1986. Houston was paying players as well, which led to the forced retirement of longtime coach Bill Yeoman at the end of the 1986 season, and later to stiff penalties.

=== David Stanley comes forward ===
In June 1986, John Sparks, a producer at Dallas–Fort Worth ABC affiliate WFAA-TV, received a tip from former SMU athletic department employee Teresa Hawthorne about further wrongdoing at the school. Sparks, along with WFAA's sports director Dale Hansen, decided to follow up on the tip, which led them to another member of the 1983 recruiting class.

David Stanley was a Parade High School All-American from the Houston suburb of Angleton. He had been heavily recruited by both Texas and Texas Tech after his senior season, but SMU was his initial preference. He chose SMU after a Texas assistant allegedly had a fight with his father, Harley, over the telephone, while he also claimed Texas Tech made him a $50,000 cash offer that he rejected. These claims were denied by both Texas and Texas Tech.

However, just before signing his letter of intent to join the Mustangs, Stanley was contacted by SMU assistant coach Bootsie Larsen, who offered Stanley $25,000 in cash to sign the letter, which Stanley accepted. From the fall of 1983, when he enrolled, until August of 1985, when Larsen was fired, Stanley said that he was paid $750 per month by the school during the semesters where he attended the school.

Stanley’s time at SMU was marred by injury issues, substance abuse, and disciplinary problems. In fact, his problems began before he even enrolled at the school; he had a physical altercation with Eric Dickerson, who was in his rookie season in the NFL, at a dinner held at Campisi's Egyptian Restaurant with some of his fellow recruits. Dickerson became furious at Stanley after he repeatedly made fun of Dickerson's height (although at six feet, three inches, Dickerson had a two-inch height advantage on Stanley), and eventually threatened to assault him while reminding him that as a high school student, he had no room to be talking about a professional athlete like he was. He urged the coaches not to sign Stanley, calling him "bad news", but Dickerson's effort was in vain. After he had signed, Stanley found himself unable to crack the starting defensive lineup, and his frequent injury issues exacerbated his already existent issues with illicit substances. Stanley was kicked off the team in 1985 and SMU rescinded his scholarship shortly thereafter, forcing him to drop out of the university when the fall semester ended in December 1985.

In an interview with Sparks and Hansen, Stanley described how the payoffs had worked. Larsen would pay him $400 up front in cash on the first of every month during the school year, with the other $350 in cash being sent to his home. Once Larsen was fired, Stanley said that Henry Lee Parker, the administrative assistant to athletic director Bob Hitch and recruiting coordinator for the football team, picked up the payments and continued to make them until Stanley left school. Stanley's mother, Dawn Stanley, even produced an envelope addressed to her, which carried a postmark of October 4, 1985.

Any local news outlet investigating SMU faced considerable risk, as the school's alumni had long dominated Dallas' business and social scene. For example, the Dallas Times Herald suffered serious losses in advertising revenue when it was the one to break the Stopperich story. At that time, the Times Herald was already struggling to compete with its rival paper The Dallas Morning News, and although the paper was eventually vindicated when SMU was placed on probation, the lost revenue never returned. It was eventually bought up by A. H. Belo, the owner of the Morning News and WFAA, and shut down in December 1991.

Had SMU's alumni chosen to retaliate in the same manner as they had with the Times Herald, Belo risked losing twice as much advertising revenue, if not more, due to owning both a newspaper and a television station. Sparks and Hansen were well aware of this. However, they pressed on, as they had concrete evidence of further wrongdoing. David and Dawn Stanley both were asked to submit to polygraph tests, which they passed.

=== SMU caught lying ===
On October 27, Hansen met with Collins, SMU athletic director Bob Hitch, and administrative assistant Henry Lee Parker. He confronted the three men with the accusations laid out by the Stanley family. Hitch, Collins, and Parker denied everything, as Hansen had expected. Hitch even went as far as to criticize Hansen and Sparks for meeting with Stanley and Hawthorne, claiming that Hawthorne was looking for revenge for being terminated from her position and that Stanley was just a bitter person who was looking to blame someone for his situation.

What the three men did not know was that Hansen had two of the envelopes sent to the Stanley home in his possession, including the one with the October 4, 1985 postmark. This particular envelope was addressed to "Mrs. Harley Stanley", with the address printed by hand, and had Parker's initials, HLP, written in similar print on the upper left corner. If Dawn Stanley was telling the truth, that would mean that not only had the school paid her son, it had done so after the most recent probation had gone into effect; thus, the Mustangs football team would be subjected to the harshest punishment under the Repeat Violator Rule.

During his initial questioning, Hansen asked Parker if he had ever sent mail to the Stanley family. When Parker said he had not, Hansen handed the two envelopes to him. After pointing specifically to the second one, which was the envelope with Parker's initials on it, Hansen asked if the envelopes had been sent by him or through the SMU office, to which Parker responded with a "yes". A moment later, Parker decided to take a second look and put on a pair of reading glasses. He then changed his answer, pointing out the letters were printed by hand onto the envelope and had not come from him directly, reasoning "[...] 'cause I don't write that way".

Hansen later said this was the moment where he knew Parker was lying. Since all Hansen had had to go on was the word of Stanley and his mother, he could not have known for sure if there really had been money in the envelope. Hansen had not mentioned money when he produced the envelopes, only asking whether mail had been sent to the Stanley family. When Parker said he had not sent anything and then backtracked when confronted with evidence, Hansen was sure Parker was hiding something. Hansen later admitted that if Parker had simply lied about the contents of the envelopes, Hansen's investigation would have been stopped cold. Years after the incident, Hansen said "that was the defining moment. All [Parker] had to say was, 'I am glad you asked, I sent him an insurance form', and we would've had to start all over, because every dot that we connected started from the premise that we know he sent something".

After this and the results of the polygraph tests, Hansen procured one final damning piece of evidence; he had Parker submit a sample of his handwriting for analysis. The expert Hansen consulted with confirmed that the submitted sample and the writing on the envelope came from the same person, and was willing to testify under oath that they matched.

On November 12, 1986, Hansen's report was aired as part of a 40-minute post-news special on WFAA. The report revealed that Stanley had already spoken to the NCAA, and that an NCAA investigation was under way. Two days later, the Morning News revealed that starting tight end Albert Reese was living rent-free in a Dallas apartment paid for by George Owen, one of the boosters who had already been banned from the athletic program for his role in the events leading up to the 1985 probation. Reese was suspended for the last two games of the season pending an investigation.

=== Professors' petition ===
On November 19, 1986, two hundred SMU professors submitted a petition to the school's board of governors, calling for the end of "quasi-professional athletics" at the school, including the elimination of all athletic scholarships. Board chairman Bill Clements, who had been re-elected as Texas governor two weeks earlier, announced that the school would tighten its admissions standards for all athletes, and that they would drop the football program entirely if necessary to restore the school's integrity.

=== Slush fund revealed ===
NCAA investigations revealed that in 1985 and 1986, thirteen players had been paid a total of $61,000 from a slush fund provided by a booster. Payments ranged from $50 to $725 per month and had started a month after SMU had been handed its latest probation. The Times Herald later identified the booster as Dallas real-estate developer Sherwood Blount Jr., who had played for the Mustangs from 1969 to 1971 (though according to Parker, other boosters were almost certainly involved in it as well). Blount Jr. had served as agent for SMU running back Craig James when the latter entered the NFL, while James also worked at Blount's Dallas real estate office in the offseason.

The players had received a total of $47,000 during the 1985‍–‍86 school year. Eight of those players were paid an additional $14,000 from September to December 1986. The payments were made with the full knowledge and approval of athletic department staff, and there was a plan to discontinue the slush fund when all thirteen players still benefiting from it had left SMU. According to the Morning News, Hitch knew about the existence of a slush fund as early as 1981, and was involved in the decision to continue the payments even after SMU was placed on probation in 1985. The Morning News said Collins also knew that certain players were being paid, but did not know who they were.

Six weeks after the professors' petition, Clements admitted that he had learned about the slush fund in 1984. An investigation by the SMU Board of Governors revealed players had been paid to play since the Ron Meyer era of the mid-1970s. According to Clements, the board secretly agreed to phase out the fund by the end of the 1986 season (rather than ending it sooner) because the members felt duty-bound to honor commitments to players who had already been promised payments. A 1987 investigation by the College of Bishops of the United Methodist Church revealed that Clements had met with Hitch in 1985, and the two agreed that despite the probation, the payments had to continue because the football program had "a payroll to meet".

At least two NFL players were identified as receiving payments—New England Patriots running back Reggie Dupard and Tampa Bay Buccaneers cornerback Rod Jones. A third player, wide receiver Ron Morris, was selected by the Chicago Bears in the second round of the 1987 NFL draft. By the end of the 1986 season, according to the Times Herald, only three of the thirteen players still had college eligibility remaining.

=== SMU bribes Hitch, Collins, and Parker ===
Soon after the scandal became public, SMU president L. Donald Shields resigned for health reasons; Hitch and Collins followed suit a few days later. According to a later United Methodist Church investigation, SMU paid Hitch, Collins and Parker $850,000 (in aggregate, it appears) to maintain their silence on the matter.

== SMU's "death penalty" ==
The nature of the violations led to speculation about the possibility of SMU receiving the NCAA "death penalty". The revelations about SMU's conduct had come at a time of general concern over the integrity of US college sports.

On February 6, 1987, SMU's faculty athletics representative, religious studies professor Lonnie Kliever, delivered a report to the NCAA recommending that the school's probation be extended by four years, until 1990, during which SMU would be allowed to hire only six assistant coaches, and only four of them would be allowed to participate in off-campus recruiting. It also recommended that SMU's ban from bowl games and live television be extended until 1989, and that two non-conference games be dropped from its schedule in each of the two years following imposition of the penalty. Assistant executive director of enforcement and compliance David Berst and the rest of the enforcement staff were so impressed by SMU's cooperation that they recommended that the infractions committee accept SMU's proposed penalties mainly unchanged; the only modification they suggested was removing the team from all non-conference play for two years, rather than from only some non-conference games.

It soon became apparent, however, that the infractions committee was not satisfied with the proposed punishments of SMU, even though both the enforcement staff and SMU had agreed on the proposed sanctions. Kliever and Berst were subjected to stern questioning, and the committee stayed in session longer than usual. On February 20, Berst told Kliever that SMU would indeed get a "death penalty." Ultimately, the committee voted unanimously to cancel SMU's entire 1987 football season and all four of its scheduled home games in 1988.

The committee praised SMU for cooperating with the investigation, saying that Kliever's efforts "went far beyond what could fairly be expected of a single faculty athletics representative". It also praised SMU's stated intent to operate within the rules when it returned to the field. This cooperation saved SMU from the full death penalty, which would have forced SMU to shut down its football program until 1989 and forfeit its right to vote at NCAA conventions until 1990. However, the committee said that it felt compelled to impose the death penalty in order to "eliminate a program that was built on a legacy of wrongdoing, deceit and rule violations". SMU's compliance record, the committee said, was "nothing short of abysmal", and the school had made no effort to reform itself over the past decade. The committee also found that SMU had gained a "great competitive advantage" over its opponents as a result of its cheating, and the death penalty was a way of rectifying this advantage.

Berst said years later that in the committee's view, the Mustang football program was so riddled with corruption that "there simply didn't seem to be any options left". Several members of the committee that imposed the sanctions later said that when the NCAA first enacted the "repeat violator" rules, it never anticipated that a situation meriting a death penalty would happen. However, they said their investigation of SMU revealed a program completely out of control. The director of enforcement for the NCAA at the time was Dan Beebe.

=== Penalties ===
The following penalties were imposed on SMU:

- The 1987 season was canceled; only conditioning drills were permitted during the 1987 calendar year.
- All home games in 1988 were canceled. SMU was allowed to play their seven regularly scheduled away games so that other institutions would not be financially affected.
- The team's pre-existing probation was extended until 1990. Its pre-existing ban from bowl games and live television was extended to 1989.
- SMU lost 55 new scholarship positions over four years.
- SMU was required to ensure that it had no more dealings with George Owen and eight other boosters previously banned from contact with the program, or else face further punishment.
- The team was allowed to hire only five full-time assistant coaches, instead of the usual nine.
- No off-campus recruiting was permitted until August 1988, and no paid visits could be made to campus by potential recruits until the start of the 1988‍–‍89 school year.

=== No football in 1988 ===
As a result of the death penalty, a full release was granted to every player on the team, allowing them to transfer to another school without losing any eligibility. Most players immediately announced they were considering going elsewhere. As soon as the NCAA announced its decision, hundreds of recruiters from around 80 universities—including powerhouses such as Oklahoma, Penn State (then the reigning national champions), and Alabama—traveled to SMU in hopes of persuading players to transfer to their schools.

Combined with the year-plus ban on off-campus recruiting, this led to speculation that SMU's football team would not be ready to play in 1988. Indeed, as early as February 27—two days after the sanctions were announced—school officials expressed doubt that SMU would have enough players to field a viable team in 1988. That day, acting athletic director Dudley Parker said that the football team would not return in 1988 "unless we can really have a team" rather than merely "a bunch of youngsters (who) aren't capable of competing".

On April 11, 1987, SMU formally canceled its 1988 football season. Acting president William Stallcup said that under the circumstances, SMU could not possibly field a competitive team in 1988. The only way SMU could have returned that year, Stallcup said, was with "walk-ons and only a handful of scholarship athletes and continuing players". Under these circumstances, Stallcup and other officials felt the players would have faced "an undue risk of serious injury". By this time, more than half of the Mustangs' scholarship players had transferred to other schools. Also, according to SWC Commissioner Fred Jacoby, there would not have been nearly enough time to find a coach, and the school still did not have a permanent replacement for Hitch.

== Aftermath at SMU ==
=== Effects on individuals ===
==== Bill Clements ====
Bill Clements apologized for his role in continuing the payments in March 1987. He said that the board had "reluctantly and uncomfortably" decided to continue the payments, feeling it had to honor previous commitments. However, he said, in hindsight "we should have stopped [the payments] immediately" rather than merely phase them out. He faced calls for his impeachment as state governor as a result of admitting his role in the payments; two state legislators argued that he would have never been elected had he honestly addressed his role in the scandal. Though he was not impeached, the scandal effectively ended Clements' political career; he did not run for re-election in 1990. He died in 2011 at the age of 94.

==== Bobby Collins ====
Bobby Collins received no personal sanctions from the NCAA for his role in the scandal, though the final report criticized him for not providing a convincing explanation for why players were still being paid after the school assured the NCAA that the payments had stopped. Nonetheless, his reputation was ruined. Though he was a finalist for a coaching position at Mississippi State in 1990 (which eventually went to Jackie Sherrill), he never coached at the collegiate level again. Collins died at the age of 88 in 2021.

==== William Stevens ====
William Stevens was involved in paying four players, as well as the Naughty Nine scandal in which nine SMU boosters were banned from further involvement with the team.

==== Sean Stopperich ====
Stopperich had nagging injuries carrying over from his high school days. He left SMU in 1985 and returned home to Pittsburgh. When the University of Pittsburgh would not offer him another scholarship, he enrolled at Temple University, where he pursued an ill-fated comeback. He was in a car accident in 1986, and the injuries he sustained put an end to his football career. In 1995, he was found dead in his Pittsburgh apartment from a cocaine overdose at the age of 29.

==== David Stanley ====
Stanley entered drug rehab while still attending SMU. He would eventually attempt to play professionally in the Canadian Football League; he made the roster for the Winnipeg Blue Bombers in 1988 and was cut after three games. Stanley was unable to fully overcome his substance abuse issues and died in his sleep in 2005 at age 41.

==== Naughty Nine ====
The "naughty nine" were a group of SMU boosters who the NCAA banned from giving any further financial aid to the university after they continued to provide secret payments (to slush funds or to individual players) despite knowing the team was on probation. One of those boosters was known to be Dallas developer George Owen, who was outright banned from the NCAA. It was initially said that the other names would never be revealed, but they were soon identified: John Appleton, Sherwood Blount, Ken Andrews, Ronnie Horowitz, Jack Ryan, Reid Ryan, William Stevens, and George Wilmont.

=== Short-term effects on SMU football ===
SMU returned to football in 1989 under coach Forrest Gregg, a former Hall of Fame lineman with the NFL's Green Bay Packers who had been a star at SMU in the early 1950s. Gregg had also been the head coach for three NFL teams prior to his arrival as coach at SMU: the Cleveland Browns from 1975 to 1977, the Cincinnati Bengals (whom he led to the Super Bowl game in his second season), from 1980 to 1983, and the Packers from 1984 to 1987. He was hired in the spring of 1988 and inherited a team made up mostly of freshmen and walk-ons. Gregg's new charges were mostly undersized and underweight; he was taller and heavier than all but a few of the players on the 70-man squad. The new squad was particularly short on offensive linemen; Gregg had to have several prospective wide receivers bulk up and move to the line. By nearly all accounts, it would have been unthinkable for SMU to have allowed such a roster to play a competitive schedule in 1988, though the NCAA had previously given its permission.

Games were moved to Ownby Stadium, a 23,000-seat on-campus facility built in 1926. It had to be heavily renovated to meet Division I-A standards; SMU had not played there regularly since 1947, and had not played any games on campus at all since 1948. The Mustangs played there until 1994, when they moved back to the Cotton Bowl, the scene of SMU's first glory era in the 1940s and 1950s. Since 2000, the Mustangs have played at Gerald J. Ford Stadium, which occupies Ownby Stadium's former physical footprint.

The 1989 Mustangs were younger, smaller, and less experienced than their opponents; one team captain later stated that he doubted whether some had even played high school football. The team unexpectedly won two games, including a late comeback victory on September 16, 1989 over Connecticut, 31‍–‍30—that game is now remembered by fans as "The Miracle on Mockingbird"—but bore almost no resemblance to their slush-fund-supported predecessors, which had been consistently ranked and had contended for the national championship as recently as 1982.

During this season the Mustangs were defeated 95‍–‍21 by Houston, the second-worst loss in school history. Eventual Heisman Trophy winner Andre Ware threw six touchdown passes against SMU in the first half, and David Klingler added four more in the second half even though the game was already far out of reach. Gregg was so disgusted with the way Houston had played that he refused to shake coach Jack Pardee's hand after the game.

Not long after that the team was, the Associated Press later reported, "scared, almost terrified" to leave the locker room to play number-one-ranked Notre Dame on November 11, 1989. The Mustangs lost the game 59‍–‍6; defensive coordinator Dale Lindsey said Notre Dame so badly outmatched SMU that "they could have beat us 156‍–‍0", and praised Notre Dame coach Lou Holtz, who ordered the Irish to take multiple intentional delay of game penalties near the goal line to avoid scoring more touchdowns.

Thirteen SMU players needed knee surgery after the 1989 season, compared to the usual three or four. Gregg, who left coaching to become SMU's athletic director in 1991, said years later, "I never coached a group of kids that had more courage. They thought that they could play with anyone. They were quality people. It was one of the most pleasurable experiences in my football life. Period."

=== Long-term consequences ===
Next to the cancellation of two seasons, the most severe sanction in the long term was the loss of 55 scholarships over four years. As a result, the Mustangs did not have a full complement of scholarships until 1992, and it was another year before they fielded a team entirely made up of players unaffected by the scandal. Additionally, in response to the scandal, SMU officials had significantly increased admissions standards for all prospective athletes. This effectively removed the school from contention for the blue-chip players they had attracted in their first 72 years of play, especially in the 1980s.

The SWC suffered greatly as a result of the scandal. It already had a dubious reputation from the number of NCAA violations at its member schools (at one point, only three of its nine members—Arkansas, Baylor, and Rice—were not on probation), and the discovery of SMU's persistent cheating was a blow from which the conference never recovered. Arkansas left the conference after the 1991 athletic season to join the Southeastern Conference (SEC), leaving only Texas-based schools in the SWC.

Three years later, a series of moves began that resulted in the SWC itself dissolving. In March 1994, the Big Eight Conference announced it was looking to expand its membership and looked to the SWC for candidates. SMU was not one of them; the Big Eight invited Texas, Texas A&M, Baylor, and Texas Tech to merge into what would become the Big 12 Conference in 1996. Instead, the Mustangs were invited to the Western Athletic Conference along with Rice and Texas Christian University as part of that conference's own major expansion. The collapse of the SWC likely ruined any chance that SMU might quickly recover from the death penalty. Later, SMU moved with Rice and fellow Texas WAC member UTEP to Conference USA (CUSA), where the school was reunited with its former conference rival Houston (which had become a charter member of CUSA after the SWC disbanded).

In 2013, SMU joined the American Athletic Conference. Even though the school had an undergraduate enrollment of about 6,000 students, one of the smallest in the Division I Football Bowl Subdivision (FBS) (ahead of only Tulsa, Rice, and the three service academies), they continued to compete in that division. (Note: Although SMU's total enrollment is just under 11,000, roughly 4,700 of those are graduate students. With very few exceptions, only undergraduate students can participate in NCAA-sponsored sports.) On July 1, 2024, along with California and Stanford from the Pac-12, SMU joined the Atlantic Coast Conference.

Prior to joining CUSA, SMU had had only one winning season since returning from the death penalty, in 1997. In 2009, the Mustangs made their first bowl appearance since 1984, a 45‍–‍10 victory over Nevada in the Hawaiʻi Bowl. They succeeded in winning the CUSA West Division in 2010, giving them their first shot at winning a conference since 1984, but lost in the Conference USA Championship to UCF, 17‍–‍7. They did, however, receive a second consecutive bowl bid. SMU was invited to participate in that year's Armed Forces Bowl to face Army in what amounted to another home game for SMU: because of construction at the game's primary site, Amon G. Carter Stadium in Fort Worth, the game was held at SMU's Gerald J. Ford Stadium. Despite playing this game on home turf, they lost 16‍–‍14. In 2011, the Mustangs were invited to the BBVA Compass Bowl in Birmingham, Alabama—the first time they had made three consecutive bowl appearances since the slush fund years of the early 1980s. The game was played on January 7, 2012, the first January bowl game for SMU since their appearance in the Cotton Bowl in 1983. By coincidence, they played Pittsburgh, the team they had defeated in that Cotton Bowl game, in the BBVA Compass Bowl, and defeated them 28‍–‍6 for their second bowl win in three seasons. SMU moved to the American Athletic Conference in 2013. The Mustangs, however, did not appear again in national rankings until they entered the AP Poll at No. 24 on September 29, 2019, and did not win a conference title until 2023, their last season in the American Athletic Conference. After the 2023 season, SMU, along with Cal and Stanford, were invited to join the Atlantic Coastal Conference as part of expansion of the conference. In their first season as an ACC member, SMU played in the ACC Title Game, becoming the first team in the championship game era to play in its conference title game in its first season in a power 4 conference, but lost to Clemson 34-31. However, SMU did clinch its first ever spot in the College Football Playoff, clinching the 11th seed in the new 12-team format. They faced off against 6th-seeded Penn State at Beaver Stadium in the first round. SMU was defeated by the Nittany Lions 38-10.

Since resuming play in 1989, SMU has played a total of 393 regular-season games, with an overall record of 143‍–‍247‍–‍3 (.367), including a record of 6‍–‍54‍–‍1 (.100) against top-25 ranked opponents. The Mustangs have gone 3‍–‍95‍–‍0 (.031) on the road against teams that went on to finish their seasons with a winning record. SMU has played 62 games in which they scored 7 points or less, while playing 16 games in which they surrendered 7 points or less. SMU's record against teams that ended their seasons with a winning record for the year is 24‍–‍160‍–‍1 (0.130). The Mustangs have played twenty-seven games against Top 15 opponents, with a record of 1‍–‍25‍–‍1.

== Effects on the NCAA ==
The far-reaching effect of imposing the "death penalty" on SMU has reportedly made the NCAA reluctant to issue another one. Since 1987, 31 schools have each committed two major violations within a five-year period, thus making them eligible for it. In that time, however, the NCAA has seriously considered shutting down a Division I team only three times—Kentucky men's basketball in 1989, Penn State football in 2012, and Texas Southern University football and men's basketball in 2012. It has handed down a "death penalty" only twice since 1987, both to smaller schools—Division II Morehouse College men's soccer in 2003 and Division III MacMurray College men's tennis in 2005.

In 2002, John Lombardi, then-president of the University of Florida, expressed the sentiment of many college officials when he said:

SMU taught the committee that the death penalty is too much like the nuclear bomb. It's like what happened after we dropped the (atom) bomb in World War II. The results were so catastrophic that now we'll do anything to avoid dropping another one.

Despite the NCAA's apparent wariness about imposing such an extreme sanction, it has indicated that the SMU case is its standard for doing so. For instance, in its investigation of Baylor basketball, the NCAA deemed Baylor's violations to be as serious as those SMU had engaged in almost 20 years earlier. However, it praised Baylor for taking swift corrective action, including forcing the resignation of coach Dave Bliss. According to the NCAA's committee, Baylor's actions stood in marked contrast to SMU's; as mentioned above, SMU officials knew serious violations were occurring and participated in the decisions to continue them. Bliss was a coach at SMU at the same time as the football scandal. Baylor did receive what amounted to a half-season death penalty—the cancellation of its non-conference games for the 2005‍–‍06 season.

Further supporting the idea that such a penalty is still a possibility, the NCAA handed down a "death penalty" to Morehouse in 2003 for what it deemed "a complete failure" to comply with NCAA rules and regulations, even though it was Morehouse's first major case of infractions. In the Penn State case, the NCAA said that the death penalty was primarily reserved for repeat violators that neither cooperated with the NCAA nor made any effort to implement corrective measures.

== Misconduct in SMU football after 1987 ==
=== Steve Malin academic fraud ===
In November 1999, twelve years after SMU's death penalty, The Dallas Morning News reported on possible academic fraud involving SMU football. Former SMU player Corlin Donaldson alleged that defensive line coach Steve Malin paid another person $100 to take Donaldson's ACT exam in 1998 so that Donaldson's score would appear high enough to qualify for SMU. Malin, who had been suspended since August, was fired on December 8, 1999.

On December 13, 2000, the NCAA placed SMU on two years' probation for Malin's fraud, as well as vacating the results of ten games of SMU's 1998 season in which Donaldson had played, which reduced SMU's record to 1‍–‍1 for the year. (SMU's 2005 media guide indicates that the NCAA vacated the first ten games of the 1998 season.) The NCAA's infractions committee "concluded that the assistant football coach [Malin] initially suggested that the prospective student-athlete [Donaldson] should participate in academic fraud, actively assisted in the initial fraudulent ACT, had actual knowledge of the fraud in the second ACT and finally, had reason to know that the prospect, after enrolling at the university and becoming a student-athlete, was ineligible to compete by reason of the academic fraud".

=== More recruiting violations ===
During the fraud investigation, the NCAA also discovered violations regarding recruiting and tryouts dating back to 1995, and mandated the extension of several self-imposed sanctions SMU had made on coaches' recruiting and official campus visits by high school recruits.

== In popular culture ==
The 1991 film Necessary Roughness focused on a university football team in a predicament very similar to the one SMU faced four years earlier. The team was forced to start the season with an almost entirely new team after the previous staff and all but one player were banned due to violations similar to the ones found at SMU. Necessary Roughness was filmed at the University of North Texas in Denton, 40 miles from SMU's campus.

=== Pony Excess ===
As noted above, ESPN's 30 for 30 documentary series profiled the SMU football scandal in one of its productions. Pony Excess (styled with dollar signs replacing the last two letters) was the thirtieth and last of the original series, airing on December 11, 2010. The documentary was narrated by Patrick Duffy, who at the time was known for starring in the television series Dallas, and was directed by Thaddeus Matula, an SMU alumnus whose father was a staff member at SMU during the scandal. The program also included interviews with several former SMU boosters, the lead NCAA investigator on the case Dan Beebe, and hall of fame coaches Lou Holtz and Grant Teaff who had competed against SMU during the 1980s in the Southwest Conference at Arkansas and Baylor, respectively. Other notable interviews included SMU president R. Gerald Turner, broadcaster Brent Musburger, and longtime Dallas Cowboys director of player personnel Gil Brandt.

Many media personalities with connections to Dallas, SMU, or both were interviewed for the film. These included:

- Former WFAA-TV sports anchor and CBS Sports college football voice Verne Lundquist, who also called Dallas Cowboys games on the radio for many years and grew up in Texas watching Doak Walker play at SMU
- Brad Sham, radio voice of the Cowboys and longtime broadcaster of the Cotton Bowl on radio who was the sports director for KRLD-AM at the time of the scandal
- WFAA-TV sports director Dale Hansen, whose investigation into the David Stanley matter led to the penalties handed down in 1987
- Dallas Mavericks voice Chuck Cooperstein, who hosted a show on KRLD at the time
- Fox Sports’ Skip Bayless, who wrote for both Dallas papers during this time covering SMU and who was working for ESPN at the time of the film’s premiere
- Richard Justice, senior writer for MLB.com who also covered SMU football for the Times Herald during his brief period there in the early 1980s
- Randy Galloway, Dallas radio personality who spent many years as a reporter for the Morning News covering various sports including football
- Norm Hitzges, longtime Dallas sports radio host

In addition to the media personalities, head coaches Ron Meyer, Forrest Gregg and June Jones, assistants Steve Endicott and Robin Buddecke, and former players Eric Dickerson, Craig James, David Richards, Bobby Leach, Lance McIlhenny, Harvey Armstrong, and Rod Jones among others were also interviewed for the program. Dawn Stanley also appeared, as did Vinita Lee Piper, David Stanley's fiancée at the time of his death. The film portrayed David Stanley as a loose cannon and showed some instances where he committed personal fouls for late hits. Dickerson, in particular, was harshly critical of Stanley.

It was noted in Morning News reporter Barry Horn's review of Pony Excess that director Thaddeus Matula, himself an SMU alumnus, tried to contact both former coach Bobby Collins and booster Sherwood Blount for interviews but both refused to speak to Matula. This did not stop Matula from featuring them in the film.

== See also ==
- Death penalty (NCAA)
- Penn State child sex abuse scandal
- University of Southern California athletics scandal
- Binghamton University basketball scandal
