= 1982 All-Southwest Conference football team =

American college football all-star team

The 1982 All-Southwest Conference football team consists of American football players chosen by various organizations for All-Southwest Conference teams for the 1982 NCAA Division I-A football season. The selectors for the 1982 season included the Associated Press (AP).

== Offensive selections ==
=== Quarterbacks ===
- Lance McIlhenny, SMU (AP-1)
- Robert Brewer, Texas (AP-2)

=== Running backs ===
- Eric Dickerson, SMU (AP-1)
- Craig James, SMU (AP-1)
- Gary Anderson, Arkansas (AP-2)
- Darryl Clark, Texas (AP-2)

=== Tight ends ===
- Deron Miller, Rice (AP-1)
- Rickey Bolden, SMU (AP-2)

=== Wide receivers ===
- Gerald McNeil, Baylor (AP-1)
- Herkie Walls, Texas (AP-1)
- David Roberson, Houston (AP-2)
- Stanley Washington, TCU (AP-2)

=== Centers ===
- Jay Bequette, Arkansas (AP-1)
- Randy Grimes, Baylor (AP-2)

=== Guards ===
- Joe Beard, SMU (AP-1)
- Steve Korte, Arkansas (AP-1)
- Mark Kirchner, Baylor (AP-2)
- Doug Dawson, Texas (AP-2)

=== Tackles ===
- Alfred Mohammed, Arkansas (AP-1)
- Bryan Millard, Texas (AP-1)
- Maceo Fifer, Baylor (AP-2)
- Doug Dawson, Texas (AP-2)

== Defensive selections ==
=== Defensive lineman ===
- Gabriel Rivera, Texas Tech (AP-1)
- Billy Ray Smith Jr., Arkansas (AP-1)
- Charles Benson, Baylor (AP-1)
- Kiki DeAyala, Texas (AP-1)
- Richard Richardson, Arkansas (AP-1)
- Kevin Chaney, SMU (AP-2)
- Earl Buckingham, Arkansas (AP-2)
- Russell Washington, SMU (AP-2)
- Clenzie Pierson, Rice (AP-2)
- Pat Coryat, Baylor (AP-2)

=== Linebackers ===
- Gary Moten, SMU (AP-1)
- Weedy Harris, Houston (AP-1)
- Darrell Patterson, TCU (AP-2)
- Bert Zinamon, Arkansas (AP-2)
- Stan Williams, Texas Tech (AP-2)
- Bobby Strogen, Texas A&M (AP-2)

=== Secondary ===
- Danny Walters, Arkansas (AP-1)
- Russell Carter, SMU (AP-1)
- Blane Smith, SMU (AP-1)
- Wes Hopkins, SMU (AP-1)
- Vic Vines, Baylor (AP-2)
- Calvin Eason, Houston (AP-2)
- Mossy Cade, Texas (AP-2)
- Domingo Bryant, Texas A&M (AP-2)

== Special teams ==
=== Place-kickers ===
- Ricky Gann, Texas Tech (AP-1)
- David Hardy, Texas A&M (AP-2)

=== Punters ===
- Craig James, SMU (AP-1)
- Ron Stowe, Baylor (AP-2)

== Miscellaneous ==
- Offensive Player of the Year: Eric Dickerson, SMU (AP)
- Defensive Player of the Year: Gabriel Rivera, Texas Tech (AP)
- Coach of the Year: Bobby Collins, SMU (AP)

== Key ==
AP = Associated Press
