= SMU Mustangs football =

SMU college football team

2026 SMU Mustangs football team
- First season: 1915; 111 years ago
- Athletic director: Damon Evans
- Head coach: Rhett Lashlee; 4th season, 45–19 (.703)
- Location: University Park, Texas
- Stadium: Gerald J. Ford Stadium (capacity: 36,742)
- NCAA division: Division I FBS
- Conference: ACC
- Colors: Red and blue
- All-time record: 563–578–54 (.494)
- CFP record: 0–1 (.000)
- Bowl record: 8–11–1 (.425)

National championships
- Claimed: 1935, 1981, 1982

College Football Playoff appearances
- 2024

Conference championships
- SWC: 1923, 1926, 1931, 1935, 1940, 1947, 1948, 1966, 1981, 1982, 1984 AAC: 2023

Division championships
- C-USA West: 2009, 2010
- Heisman winners: Doak Walker – 1948
- Consensus All-Americans: 17
- Rivalries: TCU (rivalry; dormant); Rice (rivalry; dormant); North Texas (rivalry; dormant); Navy (rivalry; dormant); Houston (rivalry; dormant)

Uniforms
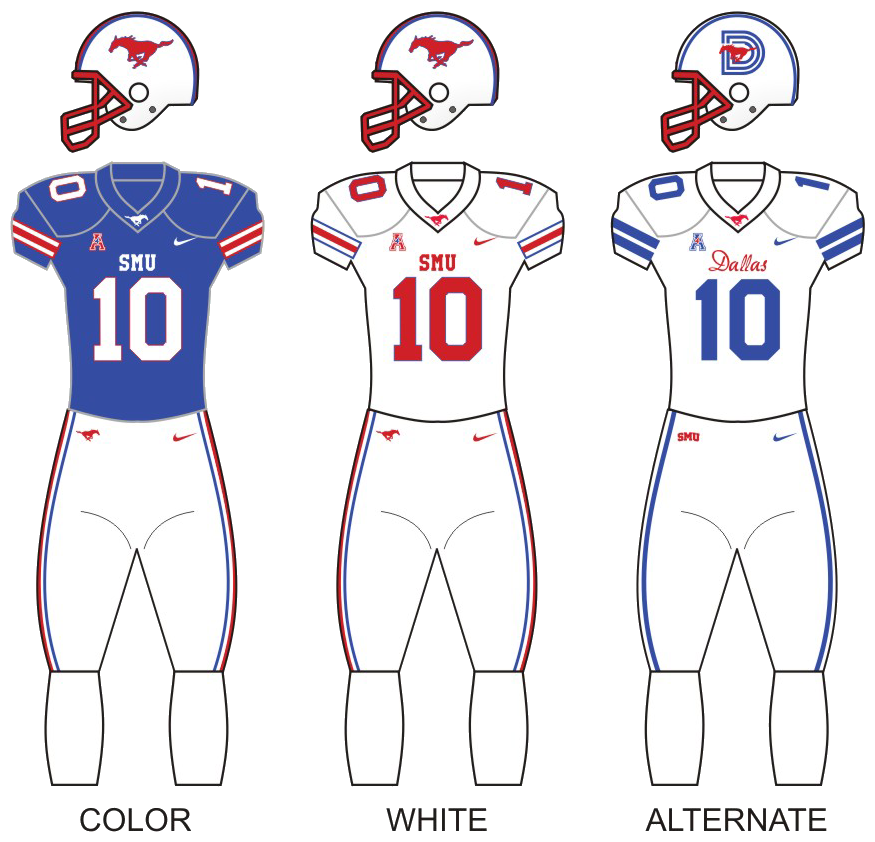
- Fight song: Pony Battle Cry
- Mascot: Peruna
- Marching band: Mustang Band
- Outfitter: Nike
- Website: smumustangs.com

The SMU Mustangs football team is a college football team representing Southern Methodist University (SMU) in University Park, Dallas County, Texas. The Mustangs compete in the NCAA Football Bowl Subdivision (FBS) as a member of the Atlantic Coast Conference (ACC). SMU joined the ACC in July 2024 after eleven years as a member of the American Athletic Conference (AAC).

== History ==
=== Early history (1915–1917) ===
In June 1915, Ray Morrison took on multiple roles at SMU as the coach for football, baseball, basketball, and track, while also serving as a math instructor. The football team was initially a member of the Texas Intercollegiate Athletic Association (TIAA) and played at Armstrong Field. Due to TIAA rules prohibiting graduate and transfer students from playing, the first season consisted solely of freshmen. During this time, the football team was known as "the Parsons" due to the large number of theology students on the team.

SMU's first game was a 43–0 loss against future rival Texas Christian University (TCU) on October 9, 1915. SMU won their first game on October 14, 1915, with a 13–2 victory over Hendrix College. SMU finished its inaugural season with a 2–5 record. After winning two games in two seasons, Morrison left SMU for service in the United States Army upon the United States’ entry into World War I.

On October 17, 1917, the school mascot, the "Mustangs", was selected. For the 1917 season, Morrison was replaced by J. Burton Rix, who led the Mustangs to a 3–2–3 record in their final season in the TIAA.

=== Joining the Southwest Conference (1918–1921) ===
In 1918, the Mustangs joined the Southwest Conference alongside Baylor University, Rice University, the University of Texas, Texas A&M University, the University of Arkansas, and Oklahoma A&M University. The Mustangs’ first season in the conference ended with a 4–2 record. Rix continued to coach the team in the 1921 season, but after two games, Rix resigned, and E. William Cunningham took over as interim head coach for the remainder of the season. The team went on to finish with a 1–6–1 record.

=== The return of Morrison (1922–1934) ===
In 1922, Morrison returned to SMU in 1920 to work in the physical education department before co-coaching the team starting in 1922 with former Vanderbilt teammate Ewing Y. Freeland. For the 1922 and 1923 seasons, Morrison focused on the backfield and ends while Freeland focused on the linemen. The team became known as the "Aerial Circus" by sportswriters due to the team's use of passing on first and second downs, instead of as a last resort play. At the time, most teams utilized the forward pass five to six times in one game, while SMU did so between 30 and 40 times.

In the 1922 season, the Mustangs compiled a 6–3–1 record. End Gene Bedford and back Logan Stollenwerck were named first-team All-Southwest Conference, becoming the first SMU football players to receive that honor. Bedford was the first player to play in the National Football League, for the Rochester Jeffersons. In the 1923 season, the SMU Mustangs achieved a perfect 9–0 record, winning its first conference football title in school history. After this season, Freeland left the SMU football team, later becoming head coach for the Texas Technological College football team, leaving Morrison as the sole head coach for SMU. SMU played in its first bowl game in the 1924 season at the Dixie Classic against West Virginia Wesleyan College but lost that game 7–9.

By 1926, the team began playing its home games at Ownby Stadium. In its first game at Ownby Stadium, the Mustangs defeated North Texas State Teachers College 42–0, led by quarterback Gerald Mann. The first Homecoming game was also played in 1926, resulting in a 14–13 victory over TCU.

The team continued to have winning seasons until the 1932 season. The Mustangs won their second conference title in 1926, compiling an 8–0–1 record, and a third conference title in 1931, compiling a 9–0–1 record. In 1928, guard Choc Sanders became SMU's first All-American, as well as the first All-American from the Southwest Conference. After a winning 1934 season, Morrison left SMU to take over at his alma mater, Vanderbilt, after the retirement of Dan McGugin.

Morrison had an 82–31–20 (.692) record during his second stint at SMU.

=== National Champions (1935–1941) ===
Morrison was replaced by Matty Bell in 1935. In his first season, Bell led the Mustangs to a 12–1 record. During this season, the Mustangs were crowned national champions by Frank Dickinson and Deke Houlgate, the namesakes for two of seven different systems used to choose a national champion at the time. For a chance to play in the Rose Bowl against the Stanford Indians football team for the unofficial national championship, SMU faced off against TCU, who featured two time All-American quarterback Sammy Baugh.

The Mustangs had three more winning seasons from 1936 to 1939. SMU failed to win the Southwest Conference title in 1940, losing out to the Texas A&M Aggies who beat the Mustangs head to head. After a 5–5 season in 1941, Bell left SMU to serve in the United States Navy during World War II.

=== World War 2 (1942–1944) ===
With Bell in the Navy, Jimmy Stewart took his place as head coach. In his three seasons as head coach, Stewart compiled an overall record of 10–18–2. Bell returned as head coach for the 1945 season.

=== Doak Walker era (1945–1949) ===
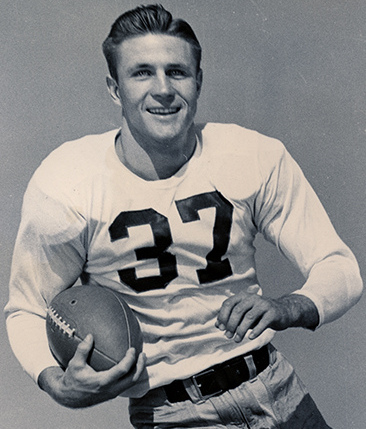
Heisman winner Doak Walker of SMU 1948.

Upon Bell's return as SMU's head coach, the team also gained halfback and placekicker Doak Walker. Walker won All-Southwest Conference honors his freshman year in 1945 and played in the East-West Shrine Game in San Francisco. Walker did not play in the 1946 season due to serving in the United States Army, yet re-enrolled at SMU and rejoined the football team for the 1947 season.

The Mustangs posted a 9–0–2 record in 1947, winning their sixth Southwest Conference title. In the same season, the team played against the Penn State Nittany Lions in the Cotton Bowl Classic, resulting in a 13–13 tie. Walker threw a 53-yard touchdown pass and scored on a two-yard run in this game. Walker earned the Maxwell Award during this season.

During the 1948 season, the Mustangs won their seventh conference title, posting a 9–1–1 record. The team played in the Cotton Bowl Classic once more, defeating the Oregon Ducks, who were led by quarterback Norm Van Brocklin, 21–13, making it their first victory in a bowl game in school history. Doak Walker, winning All-American honors, also won the Heisman Trophy, the only Mustang ever to do so. Additionally, the Mustangs permanently moved their home games to the Cotton Bowl after this season. They had only played a limited number of games at Ownby Stadium since the 1930s. In their final game at Ownby, the Mustangs defeated Texas Tech 41–6. Due to Doak Walker's popularity and gate draw—also as an allusion to 1923 Yankee Stadium's "House that Ruth Built″ moniker—the Cotton Bowl became colloquially known as "The House that Doak Built".

The 1949 season was both Doak Walker's and coach Matty Bell's last as part of SMU's football team. The team posted a 5–4–1 record. Walker won All-American honors a third time, the most for any football player in SMU's history. Bell continued to serve SMU as the athletic director; Walker played in the NFL for the Detroit Lions. Over the course of his career at SMU, Walker rushed for 1,954 yards, passed for 1,638 yards, scored 288 points, punted for a 39.4 average and kicked field goals and extra points. He is also the Mustangs' all-time leader in punt return yards with 750—that was during an "era" of NCAA single-platoon substitution rules. Bell left the head coaching position at SMU with a 79–40–8 record, including three Southwest Conference titles, a bowl game victory, and a national championship.

=== Russell, Woodard, and Meek eras (1950–1961) ===
Bell was replaced by Rusty Russell in 1950. Russell previously served as quarterbacks and running backs coach from 1945 to 1949, and is credited with luring Walker away from the University of Texas. In three seasons as head coach, Russell compiled a 13–15–2 record. After a strong first season, in which the Mustangs were ranked number one in the nation, the team suffered two losing seasons. Facing increasing scrutiny, Russell resigned as head coach after the 1952 season.

Kyle Rote, who filled Walker's place on the team, led the Southwest Conference with 777 yards rushing in 1949, and was named an All-American following the 1950 season. Quarterback Fred Benners led the Mustangs to perhaps their greatest win of the decade when he completed 22 of 42 passes for 336 yards to beat Notre Dame, 27–20, in Notre Dame, Indiana on October 13, 1951. Benners connected on TD passes of 57, 37, 31 and four yards to four different receivers as the Mustangs beat the Fighting Irish in what was one of the highlights in a 3–6–1 season. Furthermore, Forrest Gregg became part of the team in 1952, and became a two-time All-Southwest Conference player by 1955, later moving on to the NFL. Moreover, in 1952, David Powell became SMU's first Academic All-American winner.

Woody Woodard took Russell's place as head coach in 1953. Woodard compiled a 19–20–1 record in his four seasons as head coach for SMU, resigning after two consecutive losing seasons. During the 1954 season, wide receiver Raymond Berry was elected as a co-captain, despite only catching 11 passes for 144 yards, winning All-Southwest Conference and Academic All-American honors, and later played in the NFL for the Baltimore Colts.

Woodard was replaced by Bill Meek in 1957, who was coming off a Missouri Valley Conference title-winning season with the Houston Cougars. In five seasons with SMU, Meek compiled a 17–29–4 record. During Meek's time as head coach, quarterback Don Meredith earned All-American honors in 1958 and 1959, his .610 career completion percentage the best in SMU history, along with a tremendous running ability that increased the pressure on opposing defenses. The 1960 season, though, proved particularly bad for the Mustangs, as they went 0–9–1, losing every game by more than 10 points with the exception of a game against Texas A&M in which neither team scored.

=== Hayden Fry era (1962–1972) ===
In 1962, Hayden Fry became SMU's eighth head coach. The Mustangs hosted the fourth-ranked Navy Midshipmen (including quarterback Roger Staubach) on October 11, 1963, at the Cotton Bowl. SMU, en route to a 4–7 season, was considered an underdog against the Midshipmen. Little-known sophomore John Roderick rushed for 146 yards on 11 carries and scored on touchdown runs of 45 yards and two yards for the Mustangs. The SMU defense, led by Bob Oyler, Martin Cude, Bill Harlan, Harold Magers, and Doug January, sent Staubach to the bench twice with a dislocated left shoulder. Trailing 28–26 with 2:52 remaining in the game, SMU had a chance to pull off an upset. Quarterback Danny Thomas threw to Billy Gannon, who ran to the Navy 46. On the next play, Roderick took a pitchout 23 yards to the 23. After a pass interference penalty against Navy put the ball on the one-yard line, Gannon plowed over the right tackle for the winning touchdown with 2:05 left. The SMU defense held off Staubach's effort to rally his team for one last score, as the Mustangs pulled off the 32–28 upset. Despite a losing record in 1963, the Mustangs played in their first Sun Bowl since 1948 against the Oregon Ducks, losing 14–21.

When Fry took the job at SMU, he was promised that he would be allowed to recruit Black athletes. Jerry LeVias became the first Black player signed to a football scholarship in the Southwest Conference, and played his first game for SMU in 1966, one week after John Hill Westbrook of Baylor became the first Black player to play for a conference team. Fry faced backlash for recruiting a Black player, receiving hate mail and threatening phone calls. However, he stated that his treatment was minor compared to the more severe harassment LeVias faced.

During the 1966 season, Hayden Fry lifted SMU back to national prominence; SMU was ranked ninth in the nation and won its first conference championship in 18 years, its seventh overall. Fry also won Conference Coach of the Year. SMU lost in the Cotton Bowl to the Georgia Bulldogs 9–24. John LaGrone, who earned conference honors from 1964 to 1966, was the first Mustang player to be selected as both an All-American and Academic All-American when he was honored following the 1966 season.

During the 1968 season, combined with quarterback Chuck Hixson, LeVias helped lead the Mustangs to a 28–27 win over Oklahoma in the 1968 Astro-Bluebonnet Bowl, giving SMU its first bowl victory since the 1949 Cotton Bowl. SMU and Oklahoma combined to score 35 points in the fourth quarter. SMU stopped Oklahoma short of a potential game-winning two-point conversion with 1:16 left to play. LeVias was selected as an all-conference player as a senior for the third time.

Fry's Mustangs had a 12–20 record over the next three years, from 1969 to 1971. That led to uncertainty about his leadership, and rumors began to swirl after the Mustangs started the 1972 season with a 4–4 record. The three-game winning streak that followed was not enough to save Fry's job. After a 7–4 season in 1972, Fry was fired, which robbed the Mustangs of a bowl berth. In his 11 seasons at SMU, Fry compiled a 49–66–1 (.422) record.

=== Dave Smith era (1973–1975) ===
After Fry's departure, Dave Smith, a former assistant coach under Fry, took his place as head coach. Coming off a 7–4 season with Oklahoma State, Smith had two consecutive 6–4–1 seasons with SMU, with his final season resulting in a 4–7 record. In three seasons with SMU, Smith compiled a 16–15–2 (.485) record. Smith was replaced by Ron Meyer in 1976.

=== Ron Meyer-Bobby Collins era (1976–1986) ===
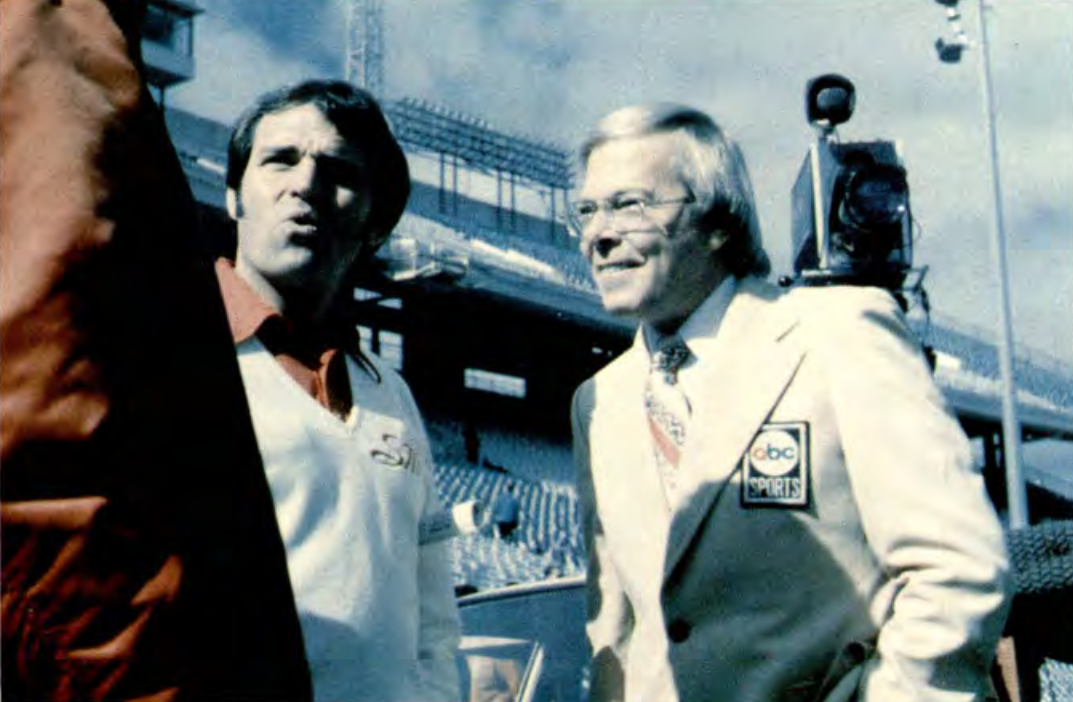
Ron Meyer on the left talking to media before game.

Coach Ron Meyer joined SMU in 1976 after a successful tenure at UNLV. Coach Meyer was notable for his recruiting tactics, including visits each year to the homes of 70 or more of the top recruits per year. His most notable recruits were future NFL running backs Eric Dickerson and Craig James before the 1979 season, as both their high school teams went 15–0 and won state championships. Combined with blue chip running back Charles Waggoner, the three backs were nicknamed the "Pony Express" running attack and shredded opposing defenses in the option offense led by quarterback Lance McIlhenny. In 1981, the Mustangs' performance earned them recognition by the National Championship Foundation as one of its five co-national champions. The final Associated Press poll ranked SMU No. 5, placing Clemson at No. 1. The team was not ranked in the coaches poll at all due to a rule forbidding teams on probation from consideration.

Coach Meyer left to become the head coach of the New England Patriots in 1982, and SMU hired Coach Bobby Collins, then head coach at the University of Southern Mississippi. Dickerson finished 3rd in the Heisman Trophy voting in 1982, and the team claimed a share of its second consecutive national championship, being selected by Bill Schroeder of the Helms Athletic Foundation as his last-ever selection, in addition to consensus-champion Penn State; the Mustangs finished second in both the AP and coaches polls.

SMU posted a 49–9–1 (.831) record from 1980 to 1984, which was the highest win percentage (.831) in Division I-A over that span.

=== "Death Penalty" and decades of rebuilding (1987–2007) ===
In 1987, SMU became the first and only football program in collegiate athletic history to receive the "death penalty" for repeated serious violations of NCAA rules. The NCAA forced SMU to cancel its football program for the 1987 season because the university had been paying some of the players—approximately $61,000 was paid from 1985 until 1986. It later emerged that SMU had been keeping a slush fund to pay players since as early as the mid-1970s and that athletic officials had known about it as early as 1981.

SMU was eligible for the "death penalty" because it had already violated recruiting rules, and had been placed on probation in 1985. Since many potential student-athletes came from lower socio-economic backgrounds, boosters had been inducing them to sign with SMU by offering them payments and expense coverage. Several key boosters and SMU officials deemed it unethical to discontinue payments once initiated, as some boosters had contractually agreed to fund certain athletes for their entire tenure at SMU. There was also the potential of disgruntled football players "blowing the whistle" on SMU should the payments be discontinued. When the sanctions were handed down, SMU had three players – all seniors close to graduation – receiving payments. Not long afterward, SMU announced that football was canceled for the 1988 season as well after school officials received indications that there would be too few experienced players at the school to field a viable team, as most of the team had left the university and transferred to other institutions. Forrest Gregg, an SMU alumnus who had been the head coach of the Green Bay Packers, Cleveland Browns, as well as the Cincinnati Bengals who he coached to a Super Bowl appearance, was hired in 1988 to help rebuild the team. When Gregg arrived, he was presented with an undersized and underweight lineup that was particularly short on offensive linemen. Nearly all observers agreed it would have been unthinkable for SMU to play the 1988 season under those conditions.

The Mustangs struggled for 20 years to recover from the effects of the penalty and the scandal. Gregg compiled a 3–19 (.136) record in his two seasons. He moved on to be SMU's athletic director from 1990 through 1994.

Following the collapse of the Southwest Conference after the 1995 season, SMU joined the Western Athletic Conference (WAC) in 1996, where they remained through 2004. SMU moved to Conference USA in 2005. The Mustangs had three more head coaches, and only one winning season, through the completion of the 2007 season.

=== C-USA era (2008–2014) ===
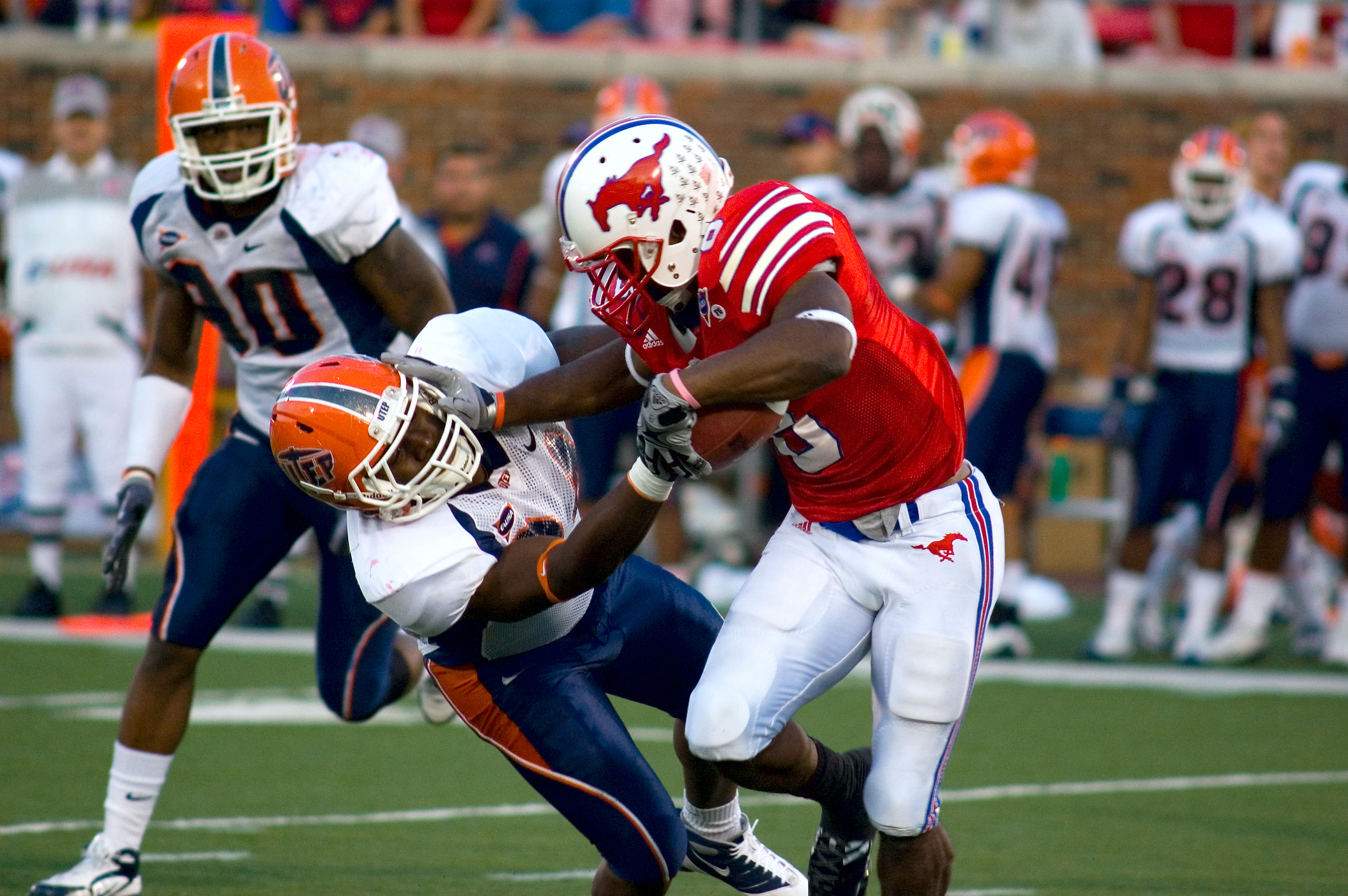
SMU in action versus UTEP in a 2009 contest.

In 2008, SMU hired Steve Orsini away from the University of Central Florida (UCF) to be SMU's athletic director. Orsini then hired June Jones from the University of Hawai'i as head football coach – the team's fifth coach since 1989. In Jones' first season at SMU, they had a 1–11 record. In 2009, Coach Jones' second season at SMU, the Mustangs made a turnaround, with a regular season record of 7–5. Despite finishing unranked in the 2009 NCAA Division I FBS football rankings, SMU was invited to its first bowl game in 25 years, and defeated the unranked Nevada Wolf Pack with a final score of 45–10 in the 2009 Hawai'i Bowl, the team's first bowl win since 1984.

In 2010, the Mustangs again compiled a regular season record of 7–5, with a 6–2 in-conference record to earn their first chance at winning a conference title in 26 years, securing a berth in the Conference USA Championship game. SMU lost the conference title game, 17–7, against UCF. Once again unranked in the 2010 NCAA Division I FBS football rankings, SMU was invited to its second consecutive bowl game, the 2010 Armed Forces Bowl, where it lost against the unranked Army Black Knights.

Following Texas A&M's move to the SEC in August and September 2011, SMU made it known that they would like to replace Texas A&M in the Big 12. SMU's interest in the Big 12 was never reciprocated, and the Big 12 instead added TCU and West Virginia University.

SMU went on to win back-to-back bowl games in the 2012 BBVA Compass Bowl (for the 2011 season) and 2012 Hawaii Bowl. SMU ended the Jones era in 2014 the way it began: with a 1–11 season. The Mustangs won the last game of the season against the University of Connecticut on December 6, 2014.

June Jones' record at SMU was 36–43 (.456) and in that timespan, SMU was invited to four bowl games, in which they went 3–1. Jones was replaced by Chad Morris in 2015.

=== Chad Morris (2015–2017) ===
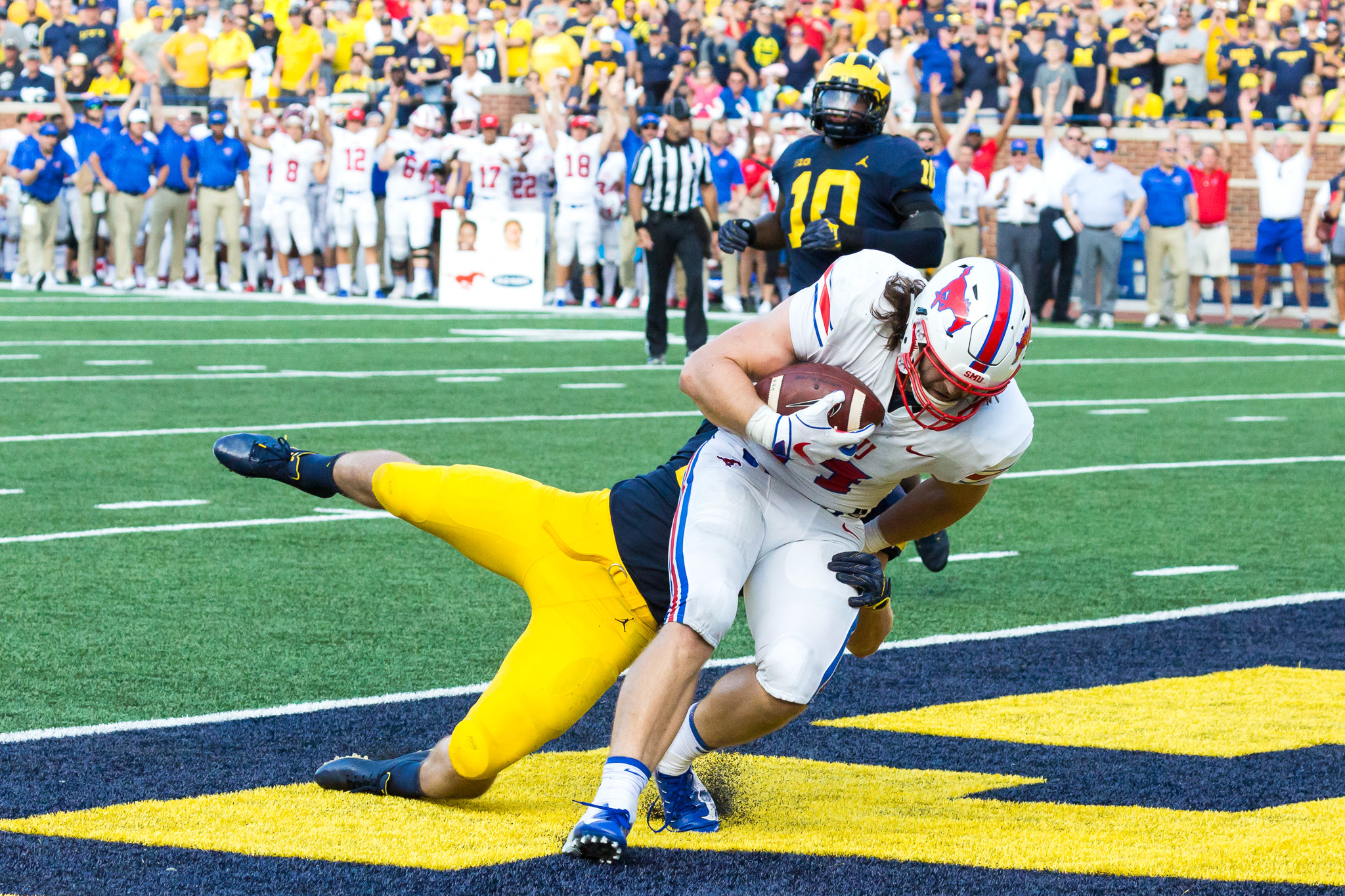
A Mustangs player scores a touchdown against Michigan in 2018.

SMU hired former Clemson offensive coordinator Chad Morris as head coach and announced his hiring on December 1, 2014. His first season resulted in a 2–10 record, a slight improvement from the 2014 season. SMU continued to improve in Morris' second season, finishing 5–7. In his 3rd season, Morris was able to lead the Mustangs to bowl eligibility and a 7–5 record in 2017. However, Morris accepted the head coaching position at Arkansas in the weeks prior to the bowl game, and SMU was forced to move quickly to hire a new football coach in light of the approaching bowl game. Chad Morris had a 12–22 (.353) record while at SMU.

=== Sonny Dykes (2017–2021) ===
Sonny Dykes was hired as the new football coach of SMU on December 11, 2017. The Mustangs were defeated by Louisiana Tech 51–10 in the DXL Frisco Bowl.

In the 2019 season, the Mustangs got off to an 8–0 start. On September 21, they defeated cross-town rival TCU. On September 29, the Mustangs were ranked in the AP top 25 for the first time since October 25, 1986.

Sonny Dykes went 30–17 (.638) while at SMU, and was invited to four bowl games, with 2 being cancelled.

=== Rhett Lashlee (2021–present) ===
Rhett Lashlee returned to SMU as the head football coach on November 29, 2021. Lashlee previously served as offensive coordinator for the Mustangs, including during the record-setting 2019 season. In 2024, the Mustangs would finish the regular season 11–1 (8–0 Conference), earning them a spot in the ACC Championship Game, where they lost 34–31 to Clemson. They would then play in the newly expanded 12-team College Football Playoff for the first time ever in 2024, where they lost in the first round to Penn State, 38–10. Applications to SMU were up 56% in 2025 over 2024, coming on the heels of the school joining the ACC and the football team earning a berth in the College Football Playoff after the 2024 season.

== Conference affiliations ==
ACC logo in SMU colors.

Years listed here are football seasons. Conference changes take effect in the summer after a school's last football season in a conference.

- Texas Intercollegiate Athletic Association (1915–1917)
- Southwest Conference (1918–1995)
- Western Athletic Conference (1996–2004)
- Conference USA (2005–2012)
- American Athletic Conference (2013–2023)
- Atlantic Coast Conference (2024–present)

== Championships ==
=== National championships ===
SMU has won three National Championships from NCAA-designated major selectors. SMU claims all three Championships.

Year	Coach	Selector	Record	Bowl	Opponent	Result	Final AP	Final Coaches
1935	Matty Bell	Berryman (QPRS), Dickinson System, Houlgate System, Sagarin Ratings, Sagarin (ELO-Chess)	12–1	Rose Bowl	Stanford	L 0–7	–	–
1981	Ron Meyer	National Championship Foundation	10–1	–	–	–	No. 5	–
1982	Bobby Collins	Helms Athletic Foundation	11–0–1	Cotton Bowl	Pittsburgh	W 7–3	No. 2	No. 2

=== Conference championships ===
SMU has claimed twelve conference championships, winning ten outright and two being shared.

Year	Conference	Coach	Record	Conference Record
1923	Southwest Conference	Ray Morrison	9–0	5–0
1926	Southwest Conference	Ray Morrison	8–0–1	5–0
1931	Southwest Conference	Ray Morrison	9–1–1	5–0–1
1935	Southwest Conference	Matty Bell	12–1	6–0
1940†	Southwest Conference	Matty Bell	8–1–1	5–1
1947	Southwest Conference	Matty Bell	9–0–2	5–0–1
1948	Southwest Conference	Matty Bell	9–1–1	5–0–1
1966	Southwest Conference	Hayden Fry	8–3	6–1
1981	Southwest Conference	Ron Meyer	10–1	7–1
1982	Southwest Conference	Bobby Collins	11–0–1	7–0–1
1984†	Southwest Conference	Bobby Collins	10–2	6–2
2023	American Athletic Conference	Rhett Lashlee	11–3	8–0

† Co-champions

=== Division championships ===
SMU has claimed two division championships.

Year	Division	Coach	Opponent	CG result
2009†	Conference USA – West	June Jones	N/A lost tie-breaker to Houston	
2010†	Conference USA – West	June Jones	UCF	L 7–17

† Co-champions

== Bowl games ==
SMU has participated in 21 bowl games. The Mustangs have a record of 8–12–1 in these games.Two bowl games were cancelled.

Season	Coach	Bowl	Opponent	Result
1924	Ray Morrison	Dixie Classic	West Virginia Wesleyan	L 7–9
1935	Matty Bell	Rose Bowl	Stanford	L 0–7
1947	Matty Bell	Cotton Bowl Classic	Penn State	T 13–13
1948	Matty Bell	Cotton Bowl Classic	Oregon	W 21–13
1963	Hayden Fry	Sun Bowl	Oregon	L 14–21
1966	Hayden Fry	Cotton Bowl Classic	Georgia	L 9–24
1968	Hayden Fry	Astro-Bluebonnet Bowl	Oklahoma	W 28–27
1980	Ron Meyer	Holiday Bowl	BYU	L 45–46
1982	Bobby Collins	Cotton Bowl Classic	Pittsburgh	W 7–3
1983	Bobby Collins	Sun Bowl	Alabama	L 7–28
1984	Bobby Collins	Aloha Bowl	Notre Dame	W 27–20
2009	June Jones	Hawaiʻi Bowl	Nevada	W 45–10
2010	June Jones	Armed Forces Bowl	Army	L 14–16
2011	June Jones	BBVA Compass Bowl	Pittsburgh	W 28–6
2012	June Jones	Hawaiʻi Bowl	Fresno State	W 43–10
2017	Sonny Dykes	Frisco Bowl	Louisiana Tech	L 10–51
2019	Sonny Dykes	Boca Raton Bowl	Florida Atlantic	L 28–52
2020	Sonny Dykes	Frisco Bowl	UTSA	Canceled
2021	Sonny Dykes	Fenway Bowl	Virginia	Canceled
2022	Rhett Lashlee	New Mexico Bowl	BYU	L 23–24
2023	Rhett Lashlee	Fenway Bowl	Boston College	L 14–23
2024	Rhett Lashlee	CFP First Round †	Penn State	L 10–38
2025	Rhett Lashlee	Holiday Bowl	Arizona	W 24–19

† CFP game

=== Playoffs ===
SMU was selected as the 11th seed in the College Football Playoff following the 2024 season, where they lost in the first round to the 6th seed, Penn State.

Year	Seed	Opponent	Round	Result
2024	11	No. 6 Penn State	First Round	L 10–38

== Head coaches ==
List of SMU head coaches.

Coach	Tenure	Record	Winning %
Ray Morrison	1915–1916	2–13–2	.176
J. Burton Rix	1917–1921	16–19–7	.464
Ray Morrison	1922–1934	82–31–20	.692
Matty Bell	1935–1941, 1945–1949	79–40–8	.654
Jimmy Stewart	1942–1944	10–18–2	.367
Rusty Russell	1950–1952	13–15–2	.467
Woody Woodard	1953–1956	19–20–1	.488
Bill Meek	1957–1961	17–29–4	.380
Hayden Fry	1962–1972	49–66–1	.427
Dave Smith	1973–1975	16–15–2	.515
Ron Meyer	1976–1981	34–32–1	.515
Bobby Collins	1982–1986	43–14–1	.750
Forrest Gregg	1989–1990	3–19	.136
Tom Rossley	1991–1996	15–48–3	.250
Mike Cavan	1997–2001	22–34	.393
Phil Bennett	2002–2007	18–52	.257
June Jones	2008–2014	36–43	.456
Tom Mason (Interim)	2014	1–9	.100
Chad Morris	2015–2017	14–22	.389
Sonny Dykes	2017–2021	30–17	.638
Rhett Lashlee	2022–present	44–18	.710

== Rivalries ==
=== TCU ===
The respective campuses are located 40 miles apart in the Dallas-Fort Worth metroplex. The SMU-TCU rivalries go for all sports as well as recruiting students from the DFW area, as SMU and TCU are the two top schools in the region in academics and sports. The teams have played all but seven years since their first meeting in 1915. They did not face each other in 1919, 1920, 1925, 1987, 1988, 2006, or 2020.

TCU and SMU fans began the tradition back in 1946. During pre-game festivities, an SMU fan was frying frog legs as a joke before the game. A TCU fan, seeing this desecration of the "frog", went over and told him that eating the frog legs was going well beyond the rivalry and that they should let the game decide who would get the skillet and the frog legs. TCU won the game, and the skillet and frog legs went to TCU. The tradition eventually spilled over into the actual game, and the Iron Skillet is now passed to the winner.

SMU and TCU have agreed to play each season through 2025 on an alternating home-and-home format; however, citing a desire to schedule as many out-of-conference games in Fort Worth as possible, TCU has decided to end the rivalry after the 2025 game.

In 2025, TCU won the most recent and currently the final matchup, 35–24, and thus holds the Iron Skillet.

TCU leads the series 54–43–7 through the 2025 season.

=== Rice ===
The Rice-SMU rivalry is a secondary one for both SMU (after TCU) and Rice (after Houston). However, it is a storied one, since SMU is located inside the city of Dallas, and Rice is located in Houston, two of Texas's largest metropolitan areas. Notably, SMU and Rice are two of the smaller universities in NCAA Division I FBS. Adding fuel to the fire is the fact that Rice and SMU are consistently ranked as some of the best private universities in Texas.

In 1918 both schools joined the Southwest Conference, and from 1926 they played every year except for 1987 and 1988, after the NCAA gave SMU's football program the "death penalty" following a cheating scandal. They played in the same conference until 2013, beginning with the Southwest (1918–1996), then the Western Athletic Conference (1996–2005) and Conference USA (2005–2012). In that time, they had met 90 times, with SMU leading 48–41–1.

In 1998 a traveling trophy, the "Mayor's Cup", was introduced to the series, and had been awarded to the winner each year through 2012. SMU left Conference USA for The American for the 2013 season, and no games were played after the 2012 meeting until Rice joined the American Athletic Conference in 2023. However, with SMU joining the Atlantic Coast Conference in 2024, the rivalry has become dormant again.

SMU won the 2023 game and thus currently holds the Mayor's Cup.

SMU leads the series 49–41–1 through the 2023 season.

=== North Texas ===
Nicknamed the "Safeway Bowl", the rivalry between SMU and North Texas is the most one-sided rivalry for the Mustangs. Its name is derived from a challenge from then North Texas head coach Matt Simon issued in 1994 after a two-year break in the series, stating "I'd like to play because I think we could beat them, and my players feel the same way. If they'd like to play on a Safeway parking lot ... just give us a date and time." While North Texas views SMU as its primary rival, SMU has historically placed greater emphasis on its rivalry with TCU. SMU and North Texas are located about 40 miles apart in the Dallas-Fort Worth Metroplex.

The schools have played on and off 42 times dating back to 1922 with three major hiatuses, from 1943 to 1973, from 1993 to 2005, and from 2008 to 2013.

North Texas joined the American Athletic Conference in 2023, making this a conference game for the first time. However, with SMU joining the Atlantic Coast Conference in 2024, the rivalry has become dormant again.

SMU leads the series 36–6–1 through the 2023 season.

=== Navy ===
SMU and Navy have played each other 25 times, with Navy leading the series 13–12. In 2009, the athletic departments of the United States Naval Academy and Southern Methodist University created the Gansz Trophy in honor of Frank Gansz who played linebacker at the Naval Academy from 1957 through 1959, was on the Navy coaching staff from 1969 through 1972, and the coaching staff at SMU for the 2008 season before his spring 2009 death. The traveling trophy series has been a useful one for both schools because they both recruit students, even non-student athletes, heavily from each other's region.

Navy joined the American Athletic Conference in 2015 which allowed for the rivalry to become a yearly conference game. However, with SMU joining the Atlantic Coast Conference in 2024, the rivalry has become dormant.

SMU won the 2023 game and thus currently holds the Gansz Trophy.

Navy leads the series 13–12 through the 2023 season.

=== All-time record vs. frequent opponents ===
Opponent	Meetings	Won	Lost	Tied
TCU	103	43	53	7
Rice	91	49	41	1
Baylor	82	36	39	7
Texas A&M	81	29	45	7
Texas	73	22	47	4
Arkansas	73	31	37	5
Texas Tech	49	16	33	0
North Texas	43	36	6	1
Houston	37	14	22	1
Tulane	30	16	14	0
Tulsa	30	17	13	0
Navy	25	12	13	0
California	4	3	1	0
Stanford	3	2	1	0

== Appearances in the final Associated Press Poll ==
SMU has made 198 appearances in the Associated Press poll over 103 seasons. SMU has been ranked in the top 10 for 63 weeks.

== Home fields ==
- Armstrong Field (1915–1925)
- Ownby Stadium (1926–1948, 1989–1994)
- Cotton Bowl (1932–1978, 1995–1999)
- Texas Stadium (1979–1986)
- Gerald J. Ford Stadium (2000–present)

== Individual achievements ==
Heisman Trophy

- Doak Walker 1948

Maxwell Award

- Doak Walker 1947

Sammy Baugh Trophy

- Chuck Hixson 1968

College Football Hall of Fame Inductees

Name	Position	Tenure at SMU	Year Inducted
Ray Morrison	Coach	1915–1916, 1922–1934	1954
Gerald "Little Red Arrow" Mann	QB	1925–1927	1969
Bobby Wilson	HB	1933–1935	1973
"Moanin'" Matty Bell	Coach	1935–1941, 1945–1949	1955
Doak "The Doaker" Walker	HB	1945, 1947–1949	1959
Kyle "The Mighty Mustang" Rote	HB	1948–1950	1964
"Dandy" Don Meredith	QB	1957–1959	1982
Hayden Fry	Coach	1962–1972	2003
Jerry LeVias	WR	1966–1968	2003
Eric Dickerson	RB	1979–1982	2020

All-Americans

Name	Position	Year
Choc Sanders	G	1928
Marion Hammon	T	1929
Speedy Mason	HB	1931
Clyde Carter	T	1934
Harry Shuford; Bobby Wilson	FB; HB	1934
Harry Shuford; Bobby Wilson; Truman "Big Dog" Spain; J.C. "Iron Man" Wetsel	FB; HB; T G	1935
Kelly Simpson	End	1941
Tom Dean	T	1945
Doak "The Doaker" Walker	HB	1947
Doak Walker	HB	1948
Doak Walker	HB	1949
Kyle "The Mighty Mustang" Rote	HB	1950
Dick Hightower	C	1951
Don "Dandy Don" Meredith	QB	1958
Don Meredith	QB	1959
John LaGrone	G	1966
Jerry LeVias	WR	1968
Robert Popelka	DE	1972
Louie Kelcher; Oscar Roan	G TE	1974
Emanuel Tolbert	WR	1978
John Simmons	DB	1980
Harvey Armstrong	DT	1981
Eric Dickerson	RB	1982
Russell Carter	DB	1983
Reggie Dupard	RB	1985
John Stewert	K	1993
DeMyron Martin	RB	2006

== Honored jerseys ==
The Mustangs has honored six jerseys.

SMU Mustangs honored jerseys
No.	Player	Pos.	Tenure
17	Don Meredith	QB	1957–1959
19	Eric Dickerson	RB	1979–1982
37	Doak Walker	HB/K	1945, 1947–1949
73	Forrest Gregg	OT/DT	1952–1955
80	Lamar Hunt	SE	1952–1955
87	Raymond Berry	E	1951–1954

== Pro Football Hall of Fame inductees ==
Name	Position	Team(s)	Years in NFL	Year Inducted
Lamar Hunt	League founder, owner	Dallas Texans; Kansas City Chiefs	1960–1962; 1963–2006	1972
Raymond Berry	End	Baltimore Colts	1955–1967	1973
Forrest Gregg	T	Green Bay Packers; Dallas Cowboys	1956, 1958–1970; 1971	1977
Doak Walker	HB	Detroit Lions	1950–1955	1986
Eric Dickerson	RB	Los Angeles Rams; Indianapolis Colts; Los Angeles Raiders; Atlanta Falcons	1983–1987; 1987–1991; 1992; 1993	1999

== Future opponents ==
=== Conference opponents ===
On October 30, 2023, the Atlantic Coast Conference (ACC) announced the future conference schedules for SMU for the 2024 season to 2030. The 17-team ACC will play an eight-game conference schedule with just one division, with four non-conference contests. All 17 teams will play each other at least twice in 7 years, once at home and once on the road. The new scheduling includes SMU having two protected games each year with California and Stanford, with the remaining 14 teams rotating each year. On September 22, 2025, the ACC announced its teams would play a nine-game conference schedule beginning in 2026. On December 16, 2025, the ACC unveiled its 2026 football league opponents, with SMU one of 12 teams that will be playing a nine-game conference schedule.

2026	2027	2028	2029	2030
Boston College	Clemson	California	Clemson	California
California	Georgia Tech	Florida State	Georgia Tech	Duke
Virginia	Stanford	Louisville	NC State	Miami
Virginia Tech	Virginia Tech	North Carolina	Stanford	Syracuse
Wake Forest	at California	at Georgia Tech	at Boston College	at Georgia Tech
at Florida State	at Pittsburgh	at NC State	at California	at North Carolina
at Louisville	at Virginia	at Stanford	at Miami	at Pittsburgh
at Stanford	at Wake Forest	at Virginia Tech	at Syracuse	at Stanford
at Syracuse				

=== Non-conference opponents ===
Announced opponents as of January 3, 2026.

2026	2027	2028	2029	2030	2031
UC Davis	Oklahoma (at Arlington)	at LSU	LSU (at Arlington)	at Colorado	Colorado
Missouri State		Nevada			at BYU
at Notre Dame					
