= Wes Hopkins =

American football player (1961–2018)

No. 48
- Position: Safety

Personal information
- Born: September 26, 1961; Birmingham, Alabama, U.S.
- Died: September 28, 2018 (aged 57); Birmingham, Alabama, U.S.
- Listed height: 6 ft 1 in (1.85 m)
- Listed weight: 213 lb (97 kg)

Career information
- High school: John Carroll Catholic (Birmingham, Alabama)
- College: SMU
- NFL draft: 1983: 2nd round, 35th overall pick

Career history
- Philadelphia Eagles (1983–1993)

Awards and highlights
- First-team All-Pro (1985); Pro Bowl (1985); First-team All-SWC (1982)

Career NFL statistics
- Sacks: 12
- Fumble recoveries: 16
- Interceptions: 30
- Defensive touchdowns: 1
- Stats at Pro Football Reference

Wesley Carl Hopkins (September 26, 1961 – September 28, 2018) was an American professional football player who played as a safety for the Philadelphia Eagles during his entire 11-year National Football League career from 1983 through 1993. A walk-on for the Southern Methodist football team, he was first noticed by coaches and teammates during a team practice after he made a ferocious tackle on his college teammate and future Pro Football Hall of Fame running back Eric Dickerson. Hopkins was named to the All-Conference selection in each of his last two seasons at SMU.

== NFL career ==
Hopkins was drafted by the Eagles in the second round (35th pick overall) of the 1983 NFL draft and started 14 games at free safety as a rookie. In 1985, he had a career-high 6 interceptions (including one for a touchdown) was voted Most Valuable Player on the Eagles defense and was selected to the Pro Bowl. In 1988, he was voted the Eagles Ed Block Courage Award winner. As part of the Eagles vaunted "Gang Green" defense, the safety tandem of Hopkins and strong safety Andre Waters lasted from 1986 to 1993. With Buddy Ryan as head coach from 1986 to 1990, the tandem were considered one of the hardest hitting and most feared safety duos in the NFL. Hopkins retired after the 1993 season and finished his career with 30 interceptions, 12 sacks and 1 touchdown.

== Death ==
Hopkins died on September 28, 2018, at age 57. He reportedly had been in failing health for a couple of months. Former teammate Harvey Armstrong said he is fairly certain that Hopkins was suffering from chronic traumatic encephalopathy (CTE), a degenerative brain disease that has been found in more than 100 former NFL players whose families donated their brains for research. "He just went into a shell, much like Andre (Waters) did," Armstrong said. "You could see some of the things he was dealing with. The depression and the anxiety and the other things that CTE causes."
