= Rice–SMU football rivalry =

American college football rivalry

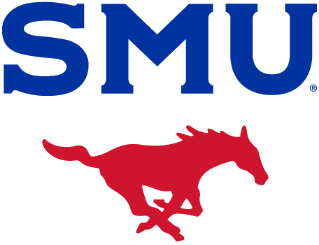
- Rice Owls SMU Mustangs
- First meeting: November 17, 1916; Rice 146, SMU 3
- Latest meeting: November 4, 2023; SMU 36, Rice 31
- Next meeting: TBD
- Trophy: Mayor's Cup

Statistics
- Total meetings: 91
- All-time series: SMU leads, 49–41–1
- Trophy series: Rice leads, 9–7
- Largest victory: Rice, 146–3 (1916); SMU, 58–0 (1978)
- Longest win streak: SMU, 10 (1977–1986)
- Current win streak: SMU, 1 (2023–present)

Locations of Rice and SMU

The Rice–SMU football rivalry is an American college football rivalry between the Rice University Owls and Southern Methodist University Mustangs. The game was first played in 1916, and since 1998 the winner was awarded the Mayor's Cup. SMU leads the series 49–41–1.

== History ==
The football squads of Rice University and Southern Methodist University, two of the smallest schools in NCAA Division I FBS, first played in 1916, with Rice winning 146–3. In 1918, both schools joined the Southwest Conference, and from 1926 they played every year except for 1987 and 1988, after the NCAA gave SMU's football program the "death penalty" following a cheating scandal. They played in the same conference until 2012, beginning with the Southwest (1918–1995), then the Western Athletic Conference (1996–2005) and Conference USA (2005–2012). The two teams have met 91 times, with SMU leading 49–41–1.

== Mayor's Cup ==
In 1998 a traveling trophy, the "Mayor's Cup", was introduced to the series, and has been awarded to the winner each year. SMU currently holds the trophy after the 2023 game, but Rice leads the trophy series 9–7. However, SMU and Rice did not play each other from 2013-2022 as SMU left Conference USA for the American Athletic Conference for the 2013 season. On June 15, 2022, Rice announced they would be officially joining the American for the 2023 season, renewing the series. On November 9, 2022, the American announced the football scheduling model for the 2023–26 seasons, with Rice–SMU scheduled to meet in 2023, 2024, and 2026.

However, on September 1, 2023, SMU accepted an invitation to join the Atlantic Coast Conference starting in 2024, which once again puts the future of the Mayor's Cup in doubt.

== Game results ==
Rice victories	SMU victories	Tie games

No.	Date	Location	Winner	Score
1	November 17, 1916	Rice Field	Rice	146–3
2	November 30, 1918	Rice Field	Rice	13–0
3	November 8, 1919	Rice Field	Rice	21–14
4	November 6, 1920	Armstrong Field	Rice	10–0
5	November 5, 1921	Rice Field	Rice	7–0
6	November 6, 1926	Ownby Stadium	SMU	20–0
7	October 14, 1927	Rice Field	SMU	34–6
8	October 20, 1928	Ownby Stadium	SMU	53–13
9	November 23, 1929	Ownby Stadium	SMU	34–0
10	November 22, 1930	Rice Field	SMU	32–0
11	October 17, 1931	Rice Field	SMU	21–12
12	October 8, 1932	Ownby Stadium	Rice	13–0
13	October 14, 1933	Rice Field	SMU	13–7
14	October 13, 1934	Rice Field	Rice	9–0
15	October 19, 1935	Ownby Stadium	SMU	10–0
16	December 5, 1936	Rice Field	SMU	9–0
17	December 4, 1937	Ownby Stadium	Rice	15–7
18	December 3, 1938	Rice Field	Rice	25–14
19	December 9, 1939	Ownby Stadium	SMU	13–6
20	December 7, 1940	Rice Field	#16 SMU	7–6
21	December 6, 1941	Ownby Stadium	Rice	6–0
22	December 5, 1942	Rice Field	Rice	13–7
23	October 16, 1943	Ownby Stadium	SMU	12–0
24	October 21, 1944	Rice Field	Rice	21–10
25	October 20, 1945	Ownby Stadium	SMU	21–18
26	October 19, 1946	Rice Field	#16 Rice	21–7
27	October 18, 1947	Ownby Stadium	SMU	14–0
28	October 16, 1948	Rice Field	#14 SMU	33–7
29	October 15, 1949	Cotton Bowl	Rice	41–27
30	October 21, 1950	Rice Stadium	#3 SMU	42–21
31	October 20, 1951	Cotton Bowl	Rice	28–7
32	October 18, 1952	Rice Stadium	SMU	21–14
33	October 17, 1953	Cotton Bowl	SMU	12–7
34	October 16, 1954	Rice Stadium	SMU	20–6
35	October 15, 1955	Cotton Bowl	SMU	20–0
36	October 20, 1956	Rice Stadium	SMU	14–13
37	October 19, 1957	Cotton Bowl	#19 Rice	27–21
38	October 18, 1958	Cotton Bowl	Rice	13–7
39	October 17, 1959	Rice Stadium	Tie	13–13
40	October 15, 1960	Cotton Bowl	Rice	47–0
41	October 21, 1961	Rice Stadium	Rice	10–0
42	October 20, 1962	Cotton Bowl	SMU	15–7
43	October 19, 1963	Rice Stadium	Rice	13–7
44	October 17, 1964	Cotton Bowl	Rice	7–6
45	October 16, 1965	Rice Stadium	SMU	17–14
46	October 15, 1966	Cotton Bowl	SMU	28–24

No.	Date	Location	Winner	Score
47	October 21, 1967	Rice Stadium	Rice	14–10
48	October 19, 1968	Cotton Bowl	SMU	32–24
49	October 18, 1969	Rice Stadium	SMU	34–14
50	October 17, 1970	Cotton Bowl	SMU	10–0
51	October 16, 1971	Rice Stadium	SMU	16–0
52	October 21, 1972	Cotton Bowl	SMU	29–14
53	October 20, 1973	Rice Stadium	SMU	27–16
54	October 19, 1974	Cotton Bowl	SMU	19–14
55	October 18, 1975	Rice Stadium	Rice	28–17
56	November 6, 1976	Rice Stadium	Rice	41–34
57	November 5, 1977	Cotton Bowl	SMU	41–24
58	November 11, 1978	Rice Stadium	SMU	58–0
59	September 8, 1979	Texas Stadium	SMU	35–17
60	November 8, 1980	Rice Stadium	#18 SMU	34–14
61	November 7, 1981	Texas Stadium	#10 SMU	33–12
62	November 6, 1982	Rice Stadium	#2 SMU	41–14
63	November 5, 1983	Texas Stadium	#8 SMU	20–6
64	November 10, 1984	Rice Stadium	#17 SMU	31–17
65	November 9, 1985	Texas Stadium	SMU	40–15
66	September 13, 1986	Rice Stadium	SMU	45–3
67	September 2, 1989	Ownby Stadium	Rice	35–6
68	November 10, 1990	Rice Stadium	Rice	30–28
69	November 9, 1991	Ownby Stadium	Rice	31–10
70	October 10, 1992	Rice Stadium	Rice	28–13
71	November 6, 1993	Ownby Stadium	Rice	31–24
72	November 5, 1994	Rice Stadium	Rice	17–10
73	October 28, 1995	Cotton Bowl	Rice	34–24
74	October 19, 1996	Rice Stadium	Rice	35–17
75	November 1, 1997	Cotton Bowl	SMU	24–6
76	September 9, 1998	Rice Stadium	Rice	23–17^{OT}
77	October 30, 1999	Cotton Bowl	SMU	27–2
78	November 4, 2000	Rice Stadium	Rice	43–14
79	November 24, 2001	Gerald J. Ford Stadium	SMU	37–20
80	October 26, 2002	Rice Stadium	Rice	27–15
81	November 15, 2003	Gerald J. Ford Stadium	Rice	41–20
82	October 9, 2004	Rice Stadium	Rice	44–10
83	November 5, 2005	Gerald J. Ford Stadium	SMU	27–7
84	November 25, 2006	Rice Stadium	Rice	31–27
85	November 10, 2007	Gerald J. Ford Stadium	Rice	43–42
86	August 29, 2008	Rice Stadium	Rice	56–27
87	November 7, 2009	Gerald J. Ford Stadium	SMU	31–28
88	October 2, 2010	Rice Stadium	SMU	42–31
89	November 26, 2011	Gerald J. Ford Stadium	SMU	27–24
90	November 17, 2012	Rice Stadium	Rice	36–14
91	November 4, 2023	Rice Stadium	SMU	36–31
Series: SMU leads 49–41–1

== See also ==
- List of NCAA college football rivalry games
