= Jimmy Stewart (American football) =

Playing career

Football
- 1921–1923: SMU

Basketball
- 1921–1922: SMU
- 1923–1924: SMU

Coaching career (HC unless noted)

Football
- 1942–1944: SMU

Basketball
- 1942–1944: SMU

Administrative career (AD unless noted)
- 1935–1945: SMU
- 1945–1950: SWC (exec. sec.)

Head coaching record
- Overall: 10–18–2 (football); 18–17 (basketball)

James Henry Stewart was an American football and basketball coach and college athletics administrator. He served as interim head football coach at Southern Methodist University (SMU) from 1942 to 1944 while Matty Bell served in the United States Navy during World War II. Stewart's record in those three seasons was 10–18–2. From 1945 to 1950 he served as Executive Secretary of the Southwest Conference (SWC).

== Head coaching record ==
=== Football ===
Year	Team	Overall	Conference	Standing
SMU Mustangs (Southwest Conference) (1942–1944)
1942	SMU	3–6–2	1–4–1	6th
1943	SMU	2–7	2–3	T–3rd
1944	SMU	5–5	2–3	T–4th
SMU:		10–18–2	5–10–1	
Total:		10–18–2		
