= 1968 Astro-Bluebonnet Bowl =

SMU Mustangs	Oklahoma Sooners
(7–3)	(7–3)
28	27
Head coach: Hayden Fry	Head coach: Chuck Fairbanks
AP / Coaches; 20 / 16	AP / Coaches; 10 / 10
	1	2	3	4	Total
SMU	0	0	6	22	28
Oklahoma	7	0	7	13	27
- Date: December 31, 1968
- Season: 1968
- Stadium: Astrodome
- Location: Houston, Texas
- Referee: Carl Landiss (SWC; split crew: SWC, Big Eight)
- Attendance: 53,543

United States TV coverage
- Network: ABC

The 1968 Astro-Bluebonnet Bowl was the first Bluebonnet Bowl that had "Astro" in the title, which would stay that way until 1984. It had what was at the time the largest crowd to see a game indoors, played by the SMU Mustangs of the Southwest Conference and the Oklahoma Sooners of the Big Eight Conference. The game was a low-scoring affair until the fourth quarter, which had 35 combined points and most notably ended on a missed conversion.

== Background ==
The only three losses SMU had were against ranked opponents (losing to #11 Ohio State, #11 Texas, and #10 Arkansas), though they did beat #19 Texas Tech while finishing 3rd in the SWC. This was SMU's third bowl game in five years. Oklahoma had started ranked #5 before a loss to #3 Notre Dame. A 2–3 start was followed by five straight victories, including victories over #3 Kansas and #6 Missouri. The Sooners finished tied for the Big 8 title with Kansas. This was Oklahoma's fourth bowl game of the decade.

== Game summary ==
Oklahoma struck first with Bob Warmack's eight-yard touchdown run. The game stood like that until the third quarter, when Mike Richardson scored on a one-yard run for SMU, but the extra point missed, trailing 7–6. A blow for OU occurred in the second quarter when QB Bob Warmack went down with a torn ACL. The rarely used backup, Mickey Ripley, came in to lead the Sooners for the remainder of the game, proving largely ineffective until the action-packed fourth quarter. Steve Owens threw a touchdown pass to Johnny Barr making the lead 14–6 for Oklahoma going into the fourth.

When Sooner defensive sparkplug Steve Zabel also went down with an injury in the third quarter, Chuck Hixson finally had some breathing room and was able to generate some offense for SMU as he threw a touchdown pass to Jerry LeVias. Hixson then threw a successful conversion pass to Clements to tie the game. Later in the quarter, Richardson scored his second touchdown, giving SMU a 21–14 lead, with 7:35 to go in the game. Oklahoma tied the game with a Ripley touchdown pass to Bo Denton. But later in the quarter while trying to take the lead back, Ripley's pass was intercepted by SMU linebacker Bruce Portillo, putting SMU in scoring position. Hixson threw another touchdown, this time to Ken Fleming to make it 28–21 with three minutes to go. With 1:16 left, Barr scored on a touchdown throw by Ripley, making it 28–27. But when Ripley tried to give the Sooners the win, he was stopped short.

The Sooners were not ready to give up just yet, however. They managed to recover the ensuing onside kick, and Ripley was able to move them down into field goal range. The massive Astrodome Jumbotron (early version) flashed the words "This is tense!" as the teams lined up for the deciding attempt. As time expired, the kick by Bruce Derr went wide left, and the Mustangs emerged with the victory.

== Aftermath ==
This was SMU's last bowl appearance for 12 years. Hayden Fry's next bowl game as a coach was the 1982 Rose Bowl following his third season with the Iowa Hawkeyes.

In contrast, Oklahoma reached seven bowl games in the following decade. The Sooners returned to the Astro-Bluebonnet Bowl two years later, playing Alabama to a 24–24 tie.

== Statistics ==
Statistics	SMU	Oklahoma
First downs	22	23
Yards rushing	72	176
Yards passing	281	294
Total offense - Yards	353	470
Punts-Average	7-41.0	6-38.2
Fumbles-Lost	2-2	1-1
Interceptions	3	2
Penalties-Yards	3-34	6-55

Rushing SMU - Richardson 18 rushes for 76 yards. Oklahoma - Owens 36 rushes for 113 yards.

Passing SMU - Hixson: 22 of 43 for 281 yards. Oklahoma - Warmack: 11 of 26 for 146 yards. Oklahoma - Ripley and Owens combined: 7–9 for 148 yards.

Receiving SMU - LeVias: 8 catches for 112 yards and one touchdown Oklahoma - Barr: 8 catches for 138 yards and two touchdowns
