= Lance McIlhenny =

American football quarterback

No. 11 – SMU Mustangs
- Position: Quarterback

Personal information
- Listed height: 5 ft 8 in (1.73 m)
- Listed weight: 190 lb (86 kg)

Career information
- High school: Highland Park (TX)
- College: SMU (1980–1983)

Awards and highlights
- 3× First-team All-SWC (1981, 1982, 1983)

Lance McIlhenny is a former American college football player who was a quarterback for Southern Methodist University. He led the SMU Mustangs to two Southwest Conference championships.

== Biography ==
McIlhenny is considered to be one of the greatest option quarterbacks in NCAA Division I-A history. As a freshman, he did not begin the 1980 season as the starter at quarterback, but was promoted during the seventh game against the University of Texas. Future NFL running backs Eric Dickerson and Craig James, combined with blue chip running back Charles Waggoner, were nicknamed the "Pony Express" for their running attack; with McIlhenny leading the offense.

In 1982, he led the Southwest Conference in passing efficiency with a 133 rating. Slocum told Sherrington, McIlhenny “understood option football. ... He had two great running backs at SMU, but he’s the one who made it all go”.

In the 1983 Cotton Bowl, number-four-ranked SMU and McIlhenny (a senior), played against the number-six-ranked University of Pittsburgh and Dan Marino in his final game. SMU won, 7-3.

McIlhenny is the winningest quarterback in school and Southwest Conference history, finishing with a career record of 34-5-1. He played a key role in the Mustangs two SWC Championships (1981, 1982).

As Kevin Sherrington, sports writer for The Dallas Morning News observed in a January 2015 analysis of the 1982 Mustangs, "Lance McIlhenny had more than a little to do with the success. He became SMU’s starting quarterback midway through his freshman year. Not because he was big or fast or could throw a pass through your earhole. What he was, was a mechanic. Nobody south of the Red River ran the option better. He learned it at the foot of Frank Bevers at Highland Park, where R.C. Slocum, then a Texas A&M assistant, recruited him for the Aggies."

In 2013, he was inducted into the SMU Athletics Hall of Fame.

== Personal life ==
His father Don McIlhenny played in the National Football League.

After college, McIlhenny opted not to continue a career in professional sports. He told UPI in 1982, "I really don't think I would want to stay in the game as a coach. ... Oh, maybe I might coach my kids or be a YMCA coach. But football takes a lot out of you. It is a grind. I get too wrapped up in it. My mom will be the first to tell you that". He worked for several commercial real estate firms in the Dallas area, including Jones Lang LaSalle, The Staubach Company, CASE Commercial Real Estate, Cresa Partners and CBRE, where he was a first vice president.
