= Bobby Collins (American football coach) =

American football player and coach (1933–2021)

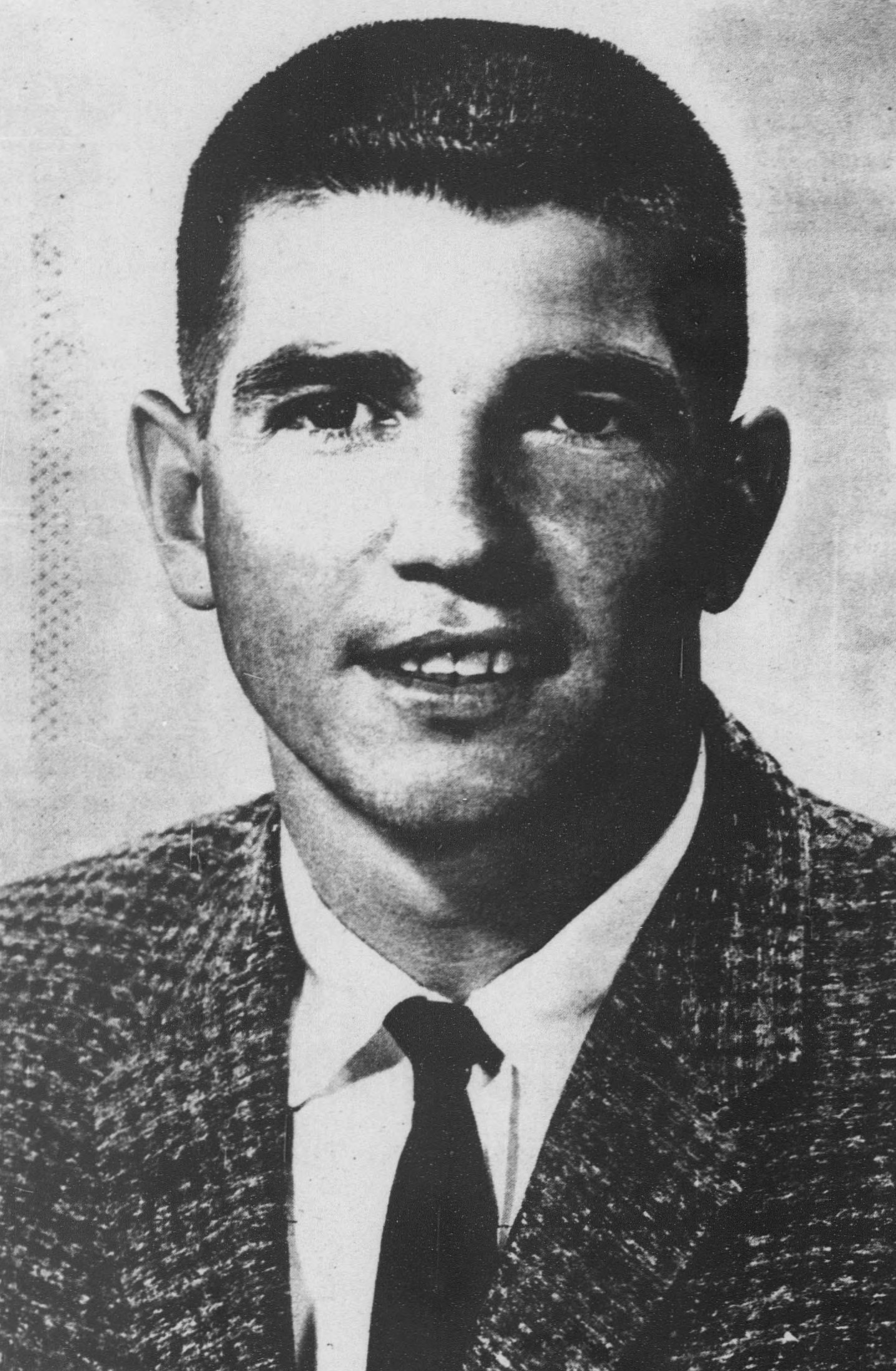
- Collins, circa 1967

Biographical details
- Born: October 25, 1933; Laurel, Mississippi, U.S.
- Died: November 15, 2021 (aged 88); Hattiesburg, Mississippi, U.S.

Playing career
- 1951–1954: Mississippi State
- Position: Quarterback

Coaching career (HC unless noted)
- 1955: Mississippi State (GA)
- 1956: Colorado State (backfield)
- 1957–1958: Mississippi State (freshmen)
- 1959–1960: Mississippi State (offensive backfield)
- 1961–1963: George Washington (backfield)
- 1964–1966: Virginia Tech (DC)
- 1967–1974: North Carolina (OC)
- 1975–1981: Southern Miss
- 1982–1986: SMU

Head coaching record
- Overall: 91–44–3
- Bowls: 3–2

Accomplishments and honors

Championships
- 2 SWC (1982, 1984)

Awards
- SWC Coach of the Year (1982)

Thurmon Lavelle "Bobby" Collins Jr. (October 25, 1933 – November 15, 2021) was an American college football coach. He served as head coach at the University of Southern Mississippi and Southern Methodist University. While at SMU, Collins saw the school's football program brought down by severe NCAA sanctions that led to the "death penalty" being applied to the program, including the cancellation of the entire 1987 season and being limited to only seven road games in 1988. However, the school opted to sit out the 1988 season as well after virtually all of the team's experienced players went elsewhere.

He was born in Laurel, Mississippi. From 1975 to 1981, Collins coached at Southern Miss, and compiled a 48–30–2 record. In 1982, he was hired by SMU, signing a five-year deal with more than $100,000 annual salary. While at SMU, Collins compiled a 43–14–1 record. His only losing season as a coach came in 1976, when he went 3–8 at Southern Miss. From 1982 to 1984, he put together the best stretch in SMU's history, going 31–4–1.

After the 1986 season, Collins, athletic director Bob Hitch and recruiting coordinator Henry Lee Parker were interviewed by WFAA-TV's Dale Hansen regarding allegations that players were being paid. Collins denied any knowledge of the affair. It later emerged that Collins knew that players were being paid, though he didn't know who they were. Collins resigned shortly after WFAA aired a special report breaking the scandal, and was later given $850,000 in severance pay in return for keeping quiet about the payments.

Collins was not sanctioned by the NCAA for any role in the events leading up to the "death penalty", though the final report criticized him for not providing a convincing explanation for why players were still being paid after the school assured the NCAA that the payments had stopped. Nonetheless, his reputation was ruined. While he was a finalist for the open head coach's job at Mississippi State in 1990 (which eventually went to Jackie Sherrill), he never returned to the collegiate ranks in any capacity since leaving SMU. He spent his remaining years raising charity for Southern Miss. On November 15, 2021, Collins died at the age of 88.

== Head coaching record ==
Year	Team	Overall	Conference	Standing	Bowl/playoffs	Coaches^{#}	AP^{°}
Southern Miss Golden Eagles (NCAA Division I / I-A independent) (1975–1981)
1975	Southern Miss	8–3					
1976	Southern Miss	3–8					
1977	Southern Miss	6–6					
1978	Southern Miss	7–4					
1979	Southern Miss	6–4–1					
1980	Southern Miss	9–3			W Independence		
1981	Southern Miss	9–2–1			L Tangerine	19	
Southern Miss:		48–30–2					
SMU Mustangs (Southwest Conference) (1982–1986)
1982	SMU	11–0–1	7–0–1	1st	W Cotton	2	2
1983	SMU	10–2	7–1	2nd	L Sun	11	12
1984	SMU	10–2	6–2	T–1st	W Aloha	8	8
1985	SMU	6–5	5–3	5th			
1986	SMU	6–5	5–3	T–4th			
SMU:		43–14–1	30–9–1				
Total:		91–44–3					
National championship Conference title Conference division title or championship game berth
^{#}Rankings from final Coaches Poll.; ^{°}Rankings from final AP Poll.
