= 1983 Cotton Bowl Classic =

- 47th Cotton Bowl Classic
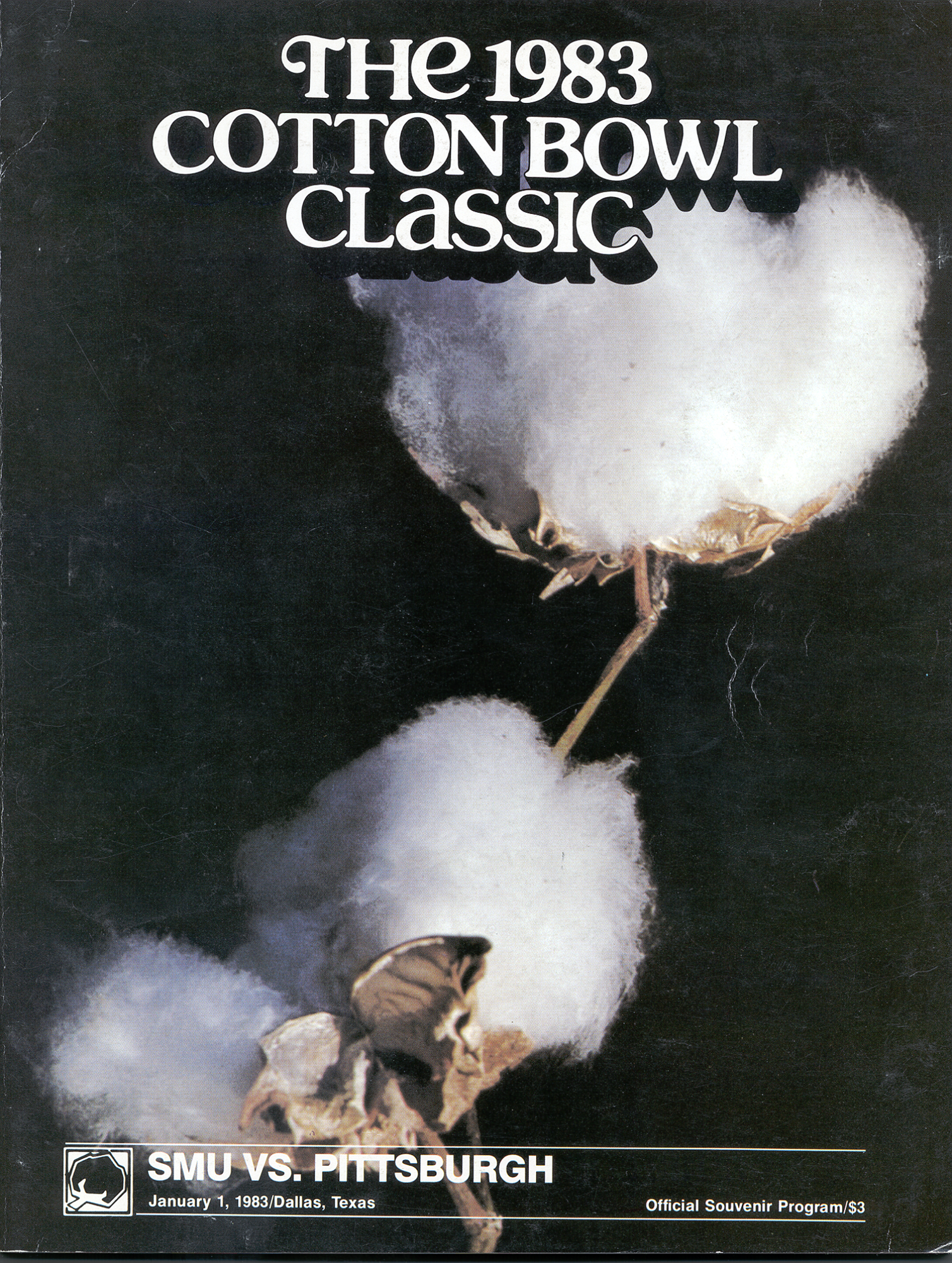
Pittsburgh Panthers	SMU Mustangs
(9–2)	(10–0–1)
Independent	SWC
3	7
Head coach: Foge Fazio	Head coach: Bobby Collins
AP / Coaches; 6 / 6	AP / Coaches; 4 / 4
	1	2	3	4	Total
Pittsburgh	0	0	3	0	3
SMU	0	0	0	7	7
- Date: January 1, 1983
- Season: 1982
- Stadium: Cotton Bowl
- Location: Dallas, Texas
- MVP: Wes Hopkins (SMU SS); Lance McIlhenny (SMU QB)
- Favorite: Pittsburgh by 2½ points
- Referee: Jimmy Harper (SEC)
- Attendance: 60,359

United States TV coverage
- Network: CBS
- Announcers: Lindsey Nelson, Pat Haden, and Pat O'Brien

The Cotton Bowl in Dallas, Texas, hosted the Cotton Bowl Classic.

The 1983 Cotton Bowl Classic was the 47th edition of the college football bowl game, played at the Cotton Bowl in Dallas, Texas, on Saturday, January 1. Part of the 1982–83 bowl game season, it matched the fourth-ranked SMU Mustangs of the Southwest Conference (SWC) and the #6 Pittsburgh Panthers, an independent. A slight underdog, SMU rallied in the fourth quarter to win, 7–3.

The game featured SMU running back Eric Dickerson, Pittsburgh tackle Jim Covert and Pittsburgh quarterback Dan Marino; all three were first round picks in the 1983 NFL draft and are members of the Pro Football Hall of Fame.

Despite the two teams combining for 622 yards, only ten points were scored in the game as there were four turnovers, and the final one decided the game.

== Teams ==
=== Pittsburgh ===
The Panthers won their first seven games and attained the #1 ranking, but lost at home to Notre Dame, and later fell at rival Penn State, the eventual national champion. Through 2026, this is their only appearance in the Cotton Bowl.

=== SMU ===
The Mustangs opened with ten wins, then tied Arkansas. This was SMU's fourth Cotton Bowl, their first in sixteen years, and remains the program's most recent major bowl appearance.

== Game summary ==
Televised by CBS, the game kicked off shortly after 12:30 p.m. CST, as did the Fiesta Bowl on NBC. Temperatures in Dallas were around freezing (32 °F (0 °C)), with light rain and sleet.

The Panthers drove to the SMU 1-yard line on the game's opening series, but Panther halfback Joe McCall fumbled, and Mustang safety Wes Hopkins fell on the loose ball at the 2-yard line. SMU and Pittsburgh did not score in the half, the first scoreless first half in the Cotton Bowl in 22 years.

On their first possession of the third quarter, the Panthers scored first when Eric Schubert booted a 43-yard field goal. SMU went on an 80-yard drive, capped by quarterback Lance McIlhenny's nine-yard touchdown run early in the fourth quarter, which was the only touchdown of the day.

Dan Marino then engineered a drive which put the Panthers in scoring position at the SMU 7-yard line. On third-and goal and under pressure, Marino threw a pass, but it was tipped by Hopkins and intercepted in the end zone by Blane Smith, helping to clinch the victory for SMU, who finished without a loss for the season.

=== Scoring ===
First quarter

No scoring

Second quarter

No scoring

Third quarter

- Pittsburgh - Eric Schubert 43-yard field goal

Fourth quarter

- SMU - Lance McIlhenny 9-yard run (Jeff Harrell kick)

== Statistics ==
Statistics	SMU	Pittsburgh
First downs	22	17
Yards rushing	60–153	29–104
Yards passing	101	181
Passing	5–9–0	19–37–1
Total Offense	69–254	66–285
Punts–Average	4–38.0	3–44.7
Fumbles–Lost	4–2	1–1
Turnovers	2	2
Penalties–Yards	2–30	8–74
Time of possession	32:48	27:12

Game leaders

- Rushing: SMU - Dickerson 27-124; Pittsburgh - Thomas 19-69
- Passing: SMU - McIlhenny 5-8-101; Pittsburgh - Marino 19-37-181
- Receiving: SMU - James 3-39; Pittsburgh - McCall 5-58, Thomas 5-38

== Aftermath ==
SMU climbed to second in the final AP poll and Pittsburgh fell to tenth.
