= 1983 Sun Bowl =

American college football game

- 50th Sun Bowl
Alabama Crimson Tide	SMU Mustangs
(7–4)	(10–1)
SEC	SWC
28	7
Head coach: Ray Perkins	Head coach: Bobby Collins
	AP / Coaches; 6 / 6
	1	2	3	4	Total
Alabama	14	14	0	0	28
SMU	0	0	7	0	7
- Date: December 24, 1983
- Season: 1983
- Stadium: Sun Bowl
- Location: El Paso, Texas
- MVP: Walter Lewis, Alabama QB
- Referee: John McClintock (Big Eight)
- Attendance: 41,412

United States TV coverage
- Network: CBS
- Announcers: Gary Bender and Pat Haden

The 1983 Sun Bowl, part of the 1983 bowl game season, took place on December 24, 1983, at the Sun Bowl in El Paso, Texas, United States. The competing teams were the Alabama Crimson Tide, representing the Southeastern Conference (SEC), and the SMU Mustangs of the Southwest Conference (SWC). Alabama was victorious in by a final score of 28–7. This was the 50th edition of the Sun Bowl (49th playing between college teams).

== Teams ==
=== Alabama ===
The 1983 Alabama squad finished the regular season with a 7–4 record and losses against Penn State, Tennessee, Boston College and Auburn. Following their loss against Boston College, university officials announced they accepted an invitation to play in the Sun Bowl. The appearance marked the first for Alabama in the Sun Bowl, and their 27th overall bowl game appearance.

=== SMU ===
The 1983 SMU squad finished the regular season with a record of 10–1 and as SWC runner-up with their only loss coming against Texas. The appearance in the Sun Bowl marked the second for SMU in the game, and their 10th overall bowl game appearance.

== Game summary ==
Coming into the 50th annual Sun Bowl, the Mustangs were heavily favored over the Crimson Tide. At #6, SMU was the highest ranked team in Sun Bowl history. Alabama dominated play in the first half and took a 28–0 lead into halftime. The Crimson Tide scored touchdowns in the first quarter on a pair of Ricky Moore runs from one and eleven yards respectively. In the second quarter, Bama scored touchdowns on a one-yard Walter Lewis run and on a 19-yard Lewis pass to Joey Jones. In the second half, both defenses were dominant with the only points coming on a 15-yard Lance McIlhenny touchdown pass to Marquis Pleasant in the third to bring the final score to its 28–7 margin. Entering the game, the Mustangs had only allowed four rushing touchdowns all season only to see the Tide score three on the ground in the first half and outgain the Mustangs in total offense 303 to 105 yards. For his performance, Alabama quarterback Walter Lewis was named the Sun Bowl MVP.

== Scoring summary ==
Scoring summary

Quarter	Time	Drive			Team	Scoring information	Score	
Quarter	Time	Plays	Yards	TOP	Team	Scoring information	Alabama	SMU
1	7:33		7 plays, 59 yards	2:17	Alabama	Ricky Moore 1-yard touchdown run, Van Tiffin kick good	7	0
1	2:18		3 plays, 51 yards	1:04	Alabama	Ricky Moore 11-yard touchdown run, Van Tiffin kick good	14	0
2	13:38		15 plays, 91 yards	6:22	Alabama	Walter Lewis 1-yard touchdown run, Van Tiffin kick good	21	0
2	1:09		3 plays, 62 yards	:28	Alabama	Joey Jones 19-yard touchdown reception from Walter Lewis, Van Tiffin kick good	28	0
3	11:29		3 plays, 78 yards	:20	SMU	Marquis Pleasant 15-yard touchdown reception from Lance McIlhenny, Jeff Harrell kick good	28	7
"TOP" = time of possession. For other American football terms, see Glossary of American football.							28	7
