= 2012 BBVA Compass Bowl =

SMU Mustangs	Pittsburgh Panthers
(7–5)	(6–6)
C-USA	Big East
28	6
Head coach: June Jones	Head coach: Keith Patterson (interim)
	1	2	3	4	Total
SMU	21	0	7	0	28
Pittsburgh	0	3	3	0	6
- Date: January 7, 2012
- Season: 2011
- Stadium: Legion Field
- Location: Birmingham, Alabama
- MVP: Darius Johnson (SMU)
- Favorite: Pittsburgh by 5
- Referee: Dan Romeo (Big 12)
- Attendance: 29,726
- Payout: US$1 million (SEC); $900,000 (Big East)

United States TV coverage
- Network: ESPN
- Announcers: Mike Gleason (Play-by-Play); John Congemi (Analyst); Eamon McAnaney (Sidelines)
- Nielsen ratings: 1.49

The 2012 BBVA Compass Bowl, the sixth edition of the game, was a post-season American college football bowl game, held on January 7, 2012, at Legion Field in Birmingham, Alabama, as part of the 2011–12 NCAA Bowl season. The game, which was telecast at 12:00 p.m. CT on ESPN, featured the SMU Mustangs of Conference USA versus the Pittsburgh Panthers of the Big East Conference. This was Pittsburgh's second consecutive appearance in the game, and just as in the previous contest the Panthers were led by an interim head coach, Keith Patterson, after Todd Graham resigned on December 13, 2011.

== Teams ==
Pittsburgh and SMU met for the first time in 29 years in this BBVA Compass Bowl, which normally pairs a Big East conference team against a team from the Southeastern Conference. The SEC conference did not have enough bowl-eligible teams this season and the SMU football team was selected by the organizers to play in the bowl. Pittsburgh and SMU had met five times previously, the last time at the 1983 Cotton Bowl on New Year's Day, when the Mustangs won 7–3.
