= 2010 Armed Forces Bowl =

American college football game

2010 Bell Helicopter Armed Forces Bowl
Army Black Knights	SMU Mustangs
(6–6)	(7–6)
Independent	C-USA
16	14
Head coach: Rich Ellerson	Head coach: June Jones
	1	2	3	4	Total
Army	13	3	0	0	16
SMU	0	0	7	7	14
- Date: December 30, 2010
- Season: 2010
- Stadium: Gerald J. Ford Stadium
- Location: University Park, Texas
- MVP: LB Stephen Anderson, Army
- Favorite: SMU by 7
- Referee: Clair Gausman (WAC)
- Attendance: 36,742 stadium record
- Payout: US$750,000 per team

United States TV coverage
- Network: ESPN
- Announcers: Beth Mowins, Ray Bentley, and Jon Berger
- Nielsen ratings: 1.3

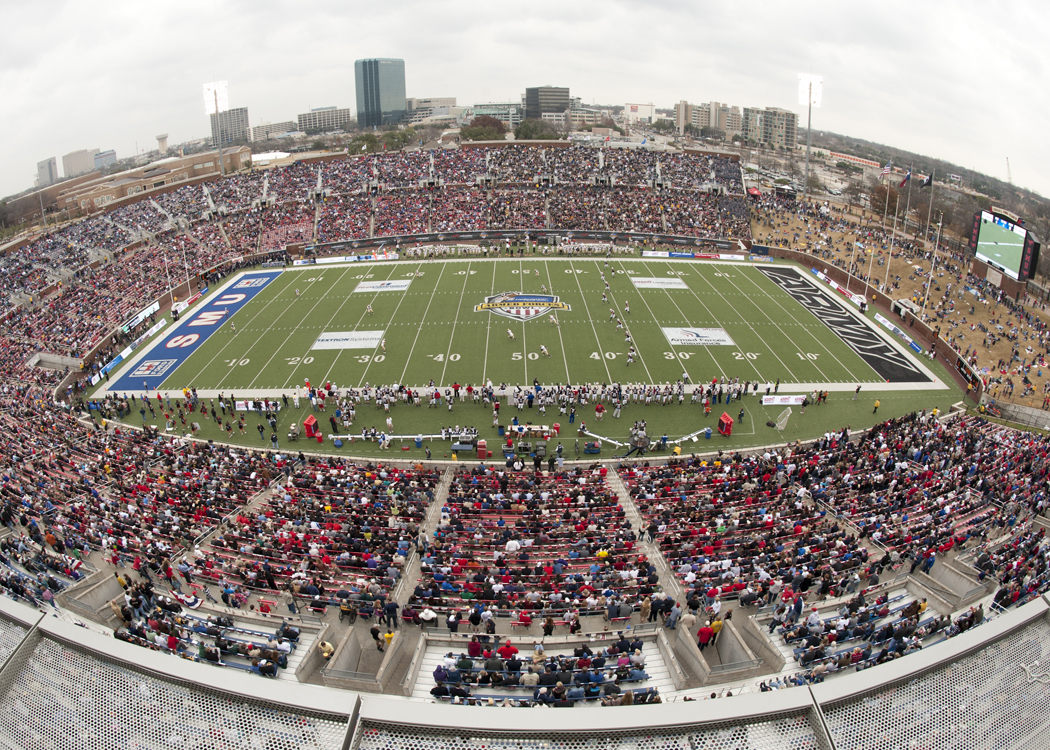
Stadium during the game

The 2010 Armed Forces Bowl was the eighth edition of the college football bowl game, and the first of two editions to be played at Gerald J. Ford Stadium on the campus of Southern Methodist University (SMU) in the Dallas enclave of University Park, Texas. From the bowl's inception as the Fort Worth Bowl in 2003, it had been held at Amon G. Carter Stadium on the campus of Texas Christian University, but a renovation project that began immediately after the 2010 regular season led to a temporary move to the SMU campus. The event returned to TCU in 2012.

The game started at 12:00 p.m. US EST on Thursday, December 30, 2010. The game was telecast on ESPN and matched the SMU Mustangs from Conference USA, playing on their home field, with the Army Black Knights.

Army's appearance in the 2010 edition of the game marked the fourth consecutive year that a service academy played in the bowl. Air Force competed in the contest in 2007, 2008, and 2009.

== Teams ==
=== Army Black Knights ===
Army officially accepted an invitation to the bowl on November 30, 2010. The Black Knights had a contingency agreement with the AF Bowl to compete in the game if Conference USA or the Mountain West Conference could not fill their bowl obligation. Since TCU was invited to a BCS Bowl and the Mountain West only had 4 other bowl eligible teams to fill 5 bowl games, the spot opened up for Army to be invited. For Army, this was their first bowl appearance since 1996 when they played in the Independence Bowl against Auburn. The 2010 game was the first time Army played in the Armed Forces Bowl.

=== SMU Mustangs ===
SMU made their second straight bowl appearance after not appearing in a bowl game since 1984, before the program was devastated by scandal. The Mustangs entered the game with a 7–6 record and were co-champions of Conference USA's West Division. SMU defeated Nevada in last season's Hawaiʻi Bowl by a score of 45–10. This was SMU's first appearance in the Armed Forces Bowl. The game was played at the Mustangs' home stadium after the contest was moved to Gerald Ford Stadium due to construction on TCU's Amon G. Carter Stadium.

== Game summary ==
=== Scoring ===
Scoring Play	Score
1st quarter
ARMY - Josh McNary 55 yard fumble recovery (Alex Carlton kick), 13:33	ARMY 7–0
ARMY - Malcolm Brown 13 yard run (Alex Carlton kick blocked), 5:26	ARMY 13–0
2nd quarter
ARMY - Alex Carlton 44 yard kick, 2:39	ARMY 16–0
3rd quarter
SMU - Kyle Padron 8 yard pass to Aldrick Robinson (Matt Szymanski kick), 2:56	ARMY 16–7
4th quarter
SMU - Kyle Padron 28 yard pass to Darius Johnson (Matt Szymanski kick), 9:20	ARMY 16–14

=== Statistics ===
Statistics	Army	SMU
First downs	16	21
Total offense, plays-yards	57-229	60-413
Rushes-yards (net)	50-199	26-111
Passes, Comp-Att-Yds	2-7-30	23-34-302
Fumbles-Interceptions	0-0	1-2
Time of Possession	29:19	30:41

== Game notes ==
Although both Army and SMU have been members of Conference USA, the teams have only played each other two previous times. This is mainly because their tenures in the Conference have not overlapped. Army was a member of the conference from 1997 to 2004 while SMU is a current member who started conference membership in 2005. Army has won the previous two meetings with the Black Knights winning a 14–13 decision at West Point in 1928 and picking up a 24–6 win at SMU in 1967.
