= List of NCAA Division I FBS football bowl records =

This article lists the all-time win/loss NCAA Division I FBS sanctioned bowl game records for all NCAA college football teams.

Win–loss records are current as of the 2025–26 bowl season. The columns for "last bowl season" and "last bowl game" have been updated to reflect 2025–26 bowl appearances for all games played through January 19, 2026.

== Records ==
=== Current FBS programs ===
University	Wins	Losses	Ties	Bowl Games Played	Winning Percentage	Last Bowl Season	Last Bowl Game	Last Bowl Win	CFP Playoff Appearances	Last AP Championship	References
Air Force	16	13	1	30	.534	2023	2023 Armed Forces Bowl	2023			(Note: Mirage Bowl not an NCAA sanctioned Div-I/FBS bowl game.)
Akron	1	2	0	3	.333	2017	2017 Boca Raton Bowl	2015			(Note: Grantland Rice Bowl not an NCAA sanctioned Div-I/FBS bowl game.) (Note: Knute Rockne Bowl not an NCAA sanctioned Div-I/FBS bowl game.) (Note: Pioneer Bowl not an NCAA sanctioned Div-I/FBS bowl game.)
Alabama	46	30	3	78	.601	2025	2026 Rose Bowl	2025	8	2020 (12)	(Note: Alabama won the 2006 Cotton Bowl Classic against Texas Tech but that win was later vacated by the NCAA.)
Appalachian State	7	2	0	9	.778	2025	2025 Birmingham Bowl	2023			
Arizona	10	12	1	23	.457	2025	2026 Holiday Bowl (January)	2023			(Note: Coca-Cola Classic not an NCAA sanctioned Div-I/FBS bowl game.)
Arizona State	15	19	1	35	.443	2025	2025 Sun Bowl	2019	1		
Arkansas	18	24	3	45	.433	2024	2024 Liberty Bowl	2024			
Arkansas State	6	7	0	13	.462	2025	2025 Xbox Bowl	2025			(Note: Refrigerator Bowl not an NCAA sanctioned Div-I/FBS bowl game.) (Note: Tangerine Bowl not an NCAA sanctioned Div-I/FBS bowl game before 1968.) (Note: Pecan Bowl not an NCAA sanctioned Div-I/FBS bowl game.) (Note: Diamond Bowl not an NCAA sanctioned Div-I/FBS bowl game.)
Army	9	3	0	12	.750	2025	2025 Fenway Bowl	2025		1945 (2)	(Note: Emerald Isle Classic not an NCAA sanctioned Div-I/FBS bowl game.)
Auburn	24	21	2	47	.532	2023	2023 Music City Bowl	2018		2010 (2)	
Ball State	1	8	0	9	.111	2021	2021 Camellia Bowl	2020			
Baylor	14	14	0	28	.500	2024	2024 Texas Bowl	2021			
Boise State	13	10	0	23	.591	2025	2025 LA Bowl	2022	1		(Note: Camellia Bowl not an NCAA sanctioned Div-I/FBS bowl game.)
Boston College	15	14	0	29	.517	2024	2024 Pinstripe Bowl	2023			
Bowling Green	5	10	0	15	.333	2024	2024 68 Ventures Bowl	2014			
Buffalo	4	3	0	7	.571	2024	2025 Bahamas Bowl	2024			
BYU	19	22	1	42	.464	2025	2025 Pop-Tarts Bowl	2025		1984 (1)	
California	12	14	1	27	.463	2025	2025 Hawaii Bowl	2019			(Note: New Year's Classic not an NCAA sanctioned Div-I/FBS bowl game.)
Central Michigan	4	10	0	14	.286	2025	2025 GameAbove Sports Bowl	2021			
Charlotte	0	1	0	1	.000	2019	2019 Bahamas Bowl				
Cincinnati	9	13	0	22	.409	2025	2026 Liberty Bowl	2019	1		(Note: Glass Bowl not an NCAA sanctioned Div-I/FBS bowl game.)
Clemson	27	25	0	52	.519	2025	2025 Pinstripe Bowl	2023	7	2018 (3)	
Coastal Carolina	2	4	0	6	.333	2025	2025 Independence Bowl	2023			
Colorado	12	19	0	31	.387	2024	2024 Alamo Bowl	2004		1990 (1)	
Colorado State	6	12	0	18	.333	2024	2024 Arizona Bowl	2013			
Connecticut	4	5	0	9	.444	2025	2025 Fenway Bowl	2024			
Delaware	1	0	0	1	1.000	2025	2025 68 Ventures Bowl	2025			
Duke	9	9	0	18	.500	2025	2025 Sun Bowl	2025			
East Carolina	9	9	0	18	.500	2025	2025 Military Bowl	2025			(Note: Lions Bowl not an NCAA sanctioned Div-I/FBS bowl game.) (Note: Elks Bowl not an NCAA sanctioned Div-I/FBS bowl game.) (Note: Eastern Bowl not an NCAA sanctioned Div-I/FBS bowl game.)
Eastern Michigan	2	5	0	7	.286	2023	2023 68 Ventures Bowl	2022			
Florida	26	24	0	50	.520	2024	2024 Gasparilla Bowl	2024		2008 (3)	
Florida Atlantic	4	1	0	5	.800	2020	2020 Montgomery Bowl	2019			
FIU	2	4	0	6	.333	2025	2025 First Responder Bowl (December)	2018			
Florida State	29	18	2	49	.612	2023	2023 Orange Bowl	2022	1	2013 (3)	(Note: Florida State won the 2006 Emerald Bowl but that win was later vacated by the NCAA.) (Note: Cigar Bowl not an NCAA sanctioned Div-I/FBS bowl game.)
Fresno State	16	14	0	30	.533	2025	2025 Arizona Bowl	2025			(Note: Charity Bowl not an NCAA sanctioned Div-I/FBS bowl game.) (Note: Aloha Bowl not an NCAA sanctioned Div-I/FBS bowl game.) (Note: Pineapple Bowl not an NCAA sanctioned Div-I/FBS bowl game.) (Note: Mercy Bowl not an NCAA sanctioned Div-I/FBS bowl game.)
Georgia	38	23	3	64	.617	2025	2026 Sugar Bowl	2023	5	2022 (3)	
Georgia Southern	4	4	0	8	.500	2025	2025 Birmingham Bowl	2025			
Georgia State	4	2	0	6	.667	2023	2023 Famous Idaho Potato Bowl	2023			
Georgia Tech	26	22	0	48	.542	2025	2025 Pop-Tarts Bowl	2023			
Hawaii	9	6	0	15	.600	2025	2025 Hawaii Bowl	2025			(Note: Poi Bowl not an NCAA sanctioned Div-I/FBS bowl game.)
Houston	14	16	1	31	.468	2025	2025 Texas Bowl	2025			
Illinois	10	12	0	22	.455	2025	2025 Music City Bowl	2025			
Indiana	6	11	0	17	.353	2025	2026 CFP National Championship	2025	2	2025 (1)	
Iowa	19	18	1	37	.513	2025	2025 ReliaQuest Bowl	2025			
Iowa State	6	12	0	18	.333	2024	2024 Pop-Tarts Bowl	2024			
Jacksonville State	2	1	0	3	.667	2025	2025 Salute to Veterans Bowl	2025			(Note: Paper Bowl not an NCAA sanctioned Div-I/FBS bowl game.)
James Madison	1	2	0	3	.333	2025	2025 CFP First Round	2024	1		
Kansas	7	7	0	14	.500	2023	2023 Guaranteed Rate Bowl	2023			
Kansas State	12	14	0	26	.462	2024	2024 Rate Bowl	2024			
Kennesaw State	0	1	0	1	.000	2025	2025 Myrtle Beach Bowl				
Kent State	1	3	0	4	.250	2021	2021 Famous Idaho Potato Bowl	2019			
Kentucky	12	11	0	23	.522	2023	2023 Gator Bowl	2021			
Liberty	3	3	0	6	.500	2024	2025 Bahamas Bowl	2021			
LSU	31	25	1	57	.553	2025	2025 Texas Bowl	2024	1	2019 (3)	
Louisiana Tech	9	5	1	15	.633	2025	2025 Independence Bowl	2025			
Louisiana	5	6	0	11	.455	2025	2025 68 Ventures Bowl	2021			(Note: Oil Bowl not an NCAA sanctioned Div-I/FBS bowl game.) (Note: 2 Louisiana bowl wins from 2011 to 2013 were vacated by the NCAA.)
Louisiana–Monroe	0	1	0	1	.000	2012	2012 Independence Bowl				
Louisville	14	13	1	28	.518	2025	2025 Boca Raton Bowl	2025			
Marshall	13	6	0	19	.684	2023	2023 Frisco Bowl	2022			
Maryland	14	14	2	30	.500	2023	2023 Music City Bowl	2023		1953 (1)	
UMass	0	0	0	0	–						
Memphis	8	9	0	17	.500	2025	2025 Gasparilla Bowl	2024			(Note: Burley Bowl not an NCAA sanctioned Div-I/FBS bowl game.)
Miami (Florida)	22	26	0	48	.458	2025	2026 CFP National Championship	2025	1	2001 (5)	(Note: Palm Festival not an NCAA sanctioned Div-I/FBS bowl game.)
Miami (Ohio)	9	8	0	17	.529	2025	2025 Arizona Bowl	2024			
Michigan	24	30	0	54	.444	2025	2025 Citrus Bowl	2024	3	2023 (3)	
Michigan State	14	16	0	30	.467	2021	2021 Peach Bowl (December)	2021	1	1952 (1)	
Middle Tennessee	4	6	0	10	.400	2022	2022 Hawaii Bowl	2022			
Minnesota	14	12	0	26	.538	2025	2025 Rate Bowl	2025		1960 (4)	
Mississippi State	15	12	0	27	.556	2025	2026 Duke's Mayo Bowl	2022			
Missouri	17	21	0	38	.447	2025	2025 Gator Bowl (December)	2024			
Missouri State	0	1	0	1	.000	2025	2025 Xbox Bowl				
Navy	14	11	1	26	.558	2025	2026 Liberty Bowl	2025			
Nebraska	27	28	0	55	.491	2025	2025 Las Vegas Bowl	2024		1995 (4)	
Nevada	7	12	0	19	.368	2021	2021 Quick Lane Bowl	2020			
New Mexico	4	9	1	14	.321	2025	2025 Rate Bowl	2016			
New Mexico State	4	1	1	6	.750	2023	2023 New Mexico Bowl	2022			
North Carolina	15	24	0	39	.385	2024	2024 Fenway Bowl	2019			
North Carolina State	18	18	1	37	.500	2025	2025 Gasparilla Bowl	2025			
North Dakota State	0	0	0	0	–						
North Texas	3	12	0	15	.200	2025	2025 New Mexico Bowl	2025			(Note: Optimist Bowl not an NCAA sanctioned Div-I/FBS bowl game.)
Northern Illinois	6	10	0	16	.375	2024	2024 Famous Idaho Potato Bowl	2024			(Note: Turkey Bowl not an NCAA sanctioned Div-I/FBS bowl game.) (Note: Hoosier Bowl not an NCAA sanctioned Div-I/FBS bowl game.) (Note: Mineral Water Bowl not an NCAA sanctioned Div-I/FBS bowl game.)
Northwestern	8	10	0	18	.444	2025	2025 GameAbove Sports Bowl	2025			
Notre Dame	23	22	0	45	.511	2024	2025 CFP National Championship	2024	3	1988 (8)	
Ohio	9	8	0	17	.529	2025	2025 Frisco Bowl	2025			
Ohio State	30	30	0	60	.500	2025	2025 Cotton Bowl Classic (December)	2024	7	2024 (6)	(Note: Ohio State won the 2011 Sugar Bowl but that win was later vacated by the NCAA.)
Oklahoma	31	27	1	59	.534	2025	2025 CFP First Round	2021	5	2000 (7)	
Oklahoma State	22	12	0	34	.647	2023	2023 Texas Bowl	2023			
Old Dominion	2	2	0	4	.500	2025	2025 Cure Bowl	2025			
Ole Miss	28	16	0	44	.636	2025	2026 Fiesta Bowl	2025	1		
Oregon	19	22	0	41	.463	2025	2026 Peach Bowl	2025	3		
Oregon State	10	8	0	18	.556	2023	2023 Sun Bowl	2022			
Penn State	34	21	2	57	.614	2025	2025 Pinstripe Bowl	2025	1	1986 (2)	(Note: 6 Penn State bowl wins from 1998 to 2011 were vacated by the NCAA.) (Note: 6 Penn State bowl wins from 1998 to 2011 were reinstated by the NCAA.)
Pittsburgh	15	24	0	39	.385	2025	2025 Military Bowl	2022		1976 (2)	
Purdue	11	10	0	21	.524	2022	2023 Citrus Bowl	2021			
Rice	7	7	0	14	.500	2025	2026 Armed Forces Bowl	2014			
Rutgers	7	5	0	12	.583	2024	2024 Rate Bowl	2023			
Sacramento State	0	0	0	0	–						
Sam Houston	1	0	0	1	1.000	2024	2024 New Orleans Bowl	2024			
San Diego State	7	11	0	18	.389	2025	2025 New Mexico Bowl	2021			
San Jose State	7	7	0	14	.500	2024	2024 Hawaii Bowl	2015			
SMU	8	12	1	21	.405	2025	2026 Holiday Bowl (January)	2025	1		
South Alabama	2	3	0	5	.400	2024	2024 Salute to Veterans Bowl	2024			
South Carolina	10	16	0	26	.385	2024	2024 Citrus Bowl (December)	2021			
South Florida	8	5	0	13	.615	2025	2025 Cure Bowl	2024			
Southern Miss	13	13	0	26	.500	2025	2025 New Orleans Bowl	2022			(Note: Doll and Toy Charity Game not an NCAA sanctioned Div-I/FBS bowl game.)
Stanford	15	14	1	30	.517	2018	2018 Sun Bowl	2018			
Syracuse	17	11	1	29	.603	2024	2024 Holiday Bowl	2024		1959 (1)	
TCU	20	17	1	38	.539	2025	2025 Alamo Bowl	2025	1	1938 (2)	
Temple	3	6	0	9	.333	2019	2019 Military Bowl	2017			
Tennessee	31	27	0	58	.534	2025	2025 Music City Bowl	2023	1	1998 (2)	
Texas	34	27	2	63	.556	2025	2025 Citrus Bowl	2025	2	2005 (3)	
Texas A&M	20	25	0	45	.444	2025	2025 CFP First Round	2020	1	1939 (1)	
Texas State	3	0	0	3	1.000	2025	2026 Armed Forces Bowl	2025			
Texas Tech	17	25	1	43	.407	2025	2026 Orange Bowl	2023	1		
Toledo	12	11	0	23	.522	2025	2025 Boca Raton Bowl	2024			
Troy	6	5	0	11	.545	2025	2025 Salute to Veterans Bowl	2022			(Note: NAIA Championship Game not an NCAA sanctioned Div-I/FBS bowl game.) (Note: Palm Bowl not an NCAA sanctioned Div-I/FBS bowl game.)
Tulane	7	11	0	18	.389	2025	2025 CFP First Round	2022	1		
Tulsa	11	12	0	23	.478	2021	2021 Myrtle Beach Bowl	2021			
UAB	3	3	0	6	.500	2022	2022 Bahamas Bowl	2022			
UCF	6	9	0	15	.429	2023	2023 Gasparilla Bowl	2021			
UCLA	17	20	1	38	.461	2023	2023 LA Bowl	2023			
UNLV	3	5	0	8	.375	2025	2025 Frisco Bowl	2024			
USC	36	21	0	57	.632	2025	2025 Alamo Bowl	2024		2004 (5)	(Note: USC won the 2005 Orange Bowl but that win was later vacated by the NCAA.)
Utah	18	10	0	28	.643	2025	2025 Las Vegas Bowl	2025			
Utah State	6	11	0	17	.353	2025	2025 Famous Idaho Potato Bowl	2021			(Note: Grape Bowl not an NCAA sanctioned Div-I/FBS bowl game.)
UTEP	5	10	0	15	.333	2021	2021 New Mexico Bowl	1967			
UTSA	3	4	0	7	.429	2025	2025 First Responder Bowl (December)	2025			
Vanderbilt	5	5	1	11	.500	2025	2025 ReliaQuest Bowl	2024			
Virginia	9	13	0	22	.409	2025	2025 Gator Bowl (December)	2025			
Virginia Tech	14	22	0	36	.389	2024	2025 Duke's Mayo Bowl	2023			
Wake Forest	12	6	0	18	.667	2025	2026 Duke's Mayo Bowl	2025			
Washington	21	22	1	44	.489	2025	2025 LA Bowl	2025	2		
Washington State	9	11	0	20	.450	2025	2025 Famous Idaho Potato Bowl	2025			
West Virginia	17	24	0	41	.415	2024	2024 Frisco Bowl	2023			
Western Kentucky	8	4	0	12	.667	2025	2025 New Orleans Bowl	2025			
Western Michigan	3	10	0	13	.231	2025	2025 Myrtle Beach Bowl	2025			
Wisconsin	19	16	0	35	.543	2023	2024 ReliaQuest Bowl (January)	2022			
Wyoming	10	9	0	19	.500	2023	2023 Arizona Bowl	2023			

=== Former FBS programs ===
University	Wins	Losses	Ties	Bowl Games Played	Winning Percentage	Last Bowl Season	Last Bowl Game	Last Bowl Win	Last AP Championship	References
Idaho ^{[FCS]}	3	0	0	3	1.000	2016	2016 Famous Idaho Potato Bowl	2016		

== See also ==
- List of NCAA Division I FBS football programs
- List of NCAA Division I FCS playoff appearances by team
- List of NCAA Division II Football Championship appearances by team
- List of NCAA Division III Football Championship appearances by team

== Notes ==
=== Program changes ===
- ^{FCS} Program has since joined FCS.
