= Maryland–West Virginia football rivalry =

American college football rivalry

- Maryland Terrapins West Virginia Mountaineers
- First meeting: October 18, 1919; West Virginia, 27–0
- Latest meeting: September 4, 2021; Maryland, 30–24
- Next meeting: TBD

Statistics
- Total meetings: 53
- All-time series: West Virginia leads, 28–23–2 (.528)
- Largest victory: Maryland: 54–7 (1951); West Virginia: 45–6 (2015)
- Longest win streak: West Virginia, 7 (2004–2012)
- Current win streak: Maryland, 1 (2021–present)

Locations of Maryland and West Virginia

The Maryland–West Virginia football rivalry is an American college football rivalry between the Maryland Terrapins and West Virginia Mountaineers. The two schools are strong rivals due to several factors, including similar recruiting areas and the relatively short distance between each other, approximately 210 miles (340 km) apart. The two teams first played in 1919 and the series ran uninterrupted from 1980 to 2007. West Virginia leads the series 28–23–2. The two teams met for the Gator Bowl for a rematch at the end of the 2003 season. Until the series first lapsed in 2007, the game was the longest continuously running non-conference game for both schools. The two teams would again play every year from 2010 to 2015, but only once (2021) in a decade since.

== Background ==
The rivalry is arguably more competitive than Maryland's other two historically important games: Virginia and Penn State. For West Virginia, it may not be as emotional as the Backyard Brawl, but it is still an important game. Due to the game traditionally being played early in the season, both teams have historically viewed the game as a good measuring stick for the rest of the season.

ESPN personality and former Maryland assistant coach, Lee Corso said, that during the 1960s, the rivalry "was really competitive because of the fact that they would sometimes come to Maryland and recruit our players, and we would try to go to West Virginia and recruit some of them ... That adds to the rivalry."

This practice of poaching the opponent's areas of interest remains to this day. In recent history, Terps fullback Cory Jackson was a Morgantown native, while former quarterback Scott McBrien transferred from West Virginia after frustration over not starting. In McBrien's last college game, the 2004 Gator Bowl, he passed for a school bowl record 381 yards and three touchdowns during a 41–7 thrashing of the Mountaineers. Conversely, Heisman finalist Steve Slaton was originally offered a scholarship to Maryland but chose West Virginia when the offer was ultimately revoked. In the 2007 game Slaton exacted his revenge, running for 137 yards and three touchdowns against the Terps. Likewise, fullback Owen Schmitt from northern Virginia originally wished to play for Maryland, but when the school was uninterested, he walked onto the Mountaineers, from where he was since drafted into the NFL. Schmitt had his "coming out" party in WVU's 31–19 triumph over the Terrapins in 2005, gaining 80 yards on just six carries and contributing substantially to two Mountaineer touchdown drives which broke the game open early in the fourth quarter.

There was a two-year hiatus during the 2008 and 2009 seasons, in which Maryland played California and West Virginia played Colorado. The schools agreed to resume the series, scheduling games for each year from 2010 to 2013. West Virginia won the first game after the hiatus, 31–17 in Morgantown. On September 13, 2010, the two schools announced a deal to extend the series through 2017. The 2013 game, designated a Maryland home game, was played at M&T Bank Stadium in Baltimore. Maryland dominated with a 37–0 shutout victory, the first since 1999. The following season, in 2014, West Virginia and Maryland combined for over 1,000 yards of total offense as the Mountaineers beat the Terrapins 40–37 on a last-second Josh Lambert field goal. West Virginia hosted Maryland in 2015 and beat the Terrapins 45–6. The two teams were supposed to play in Morgantown in 2020 but the game was canceled due to the COVID-19 pandemic.

In 2021, a bolstered and rejuvenated Maryland team fared much better in its first game against WVU in 6 years, forcing 4 turnovers and holding off West Virginia 30-24.[10]

== Notable games ==
=== 1949 ===
#15 Maryland 47, West Virginia 7

In the first game with one of the two ranked, #15 Maryland routed West Virginia 47–7. In the first half, head coach Jim Tatum guided the Terrapins to a 21–0 lead, and kept the Mountaineers offense from advancing past midfield all but once. In the third quarter, Maryland scored three touchdowns in quick succession. Six Maryland players scored, including two different centers, and back Ed Modzelewski twice. With the win, Maryland improved to 8–1 to help its case for an eventual berth in the 1950 Gator Bowl. The Terrapins extended their season scoring total to 233 points, the most in school history.

=== 1951 ===
#5 Maryland 54, West Virginia 7

In Maryland's season finale before an already-secured berth in the 1952 Sugar Bowl, at halftime Maryland led 35–7. In the second half, coach Tatum fielded mostly reserve players to prevent running up the score. Back Ed Modzelewski had 14 carries for 131 yards and two touchdowns, which outgained the combined mark for the opposing team for the sixth time of the season. The Maryland defense stifled the West Virginia ground attack, which rushed only eight times for a net loss of 21 yards. The win preserved Maryland's perfect record, which made it the first undefeated Terrapins team in 57 years.

=== 1977 ===
West Virginia 24, #11 Maryland 16

West Virginia snapped #11 Maryland's 15-game regular season winning streak, and ended their hopes for a second undefeated season. The Mountaineers dominated the first half behind an efficient effort by quarterback Dan Kendra who completed six consecutive passes and led the team to a 24–0 halftime advantage. The third touchdown came on a 54-yard Kendra pass to wide receiver Cedric Thomas, who was open because of blown coverage by cornerback Jonathan Claiborne, Maryland coach Jerry Claiborne's son. The West Virginia defense stifled Maryland's comeback bid in the final minutes with a stop on the two-yard line.

=== 1982 ===
#17 West Virginia 19, Maryland 18

In a clash of eventual AP top twenty-finishing teams, the Mountaineers outlasted the Terrapins in a nail-biter when Maryland's all-or-nothing bid for a game-winning two-point conversion attempt failed late in the game. Jeff Hostetler and Boomer Esiason each threw TD passes for their respective teams, and WVU kicker Paul Woodside boomed four field goals, three over forty yards. Mountaineer coach Don Nehlen later cited the victory as being more important than his team's stunning upset of traditional power Oklahoma the previous weekend.

=== 1983 ===
#20 West Virginia 31, #17 Maryland 21

West Virginia quarterback Jeff Hostetler threw interceptions which resulted in Maryland taking an early 10–0 lead. A touchdown by Mountaineers running back Ron Wolfley and field goal by kicker Paul Woodside tied it before halftime. In the second half, Hostetler threw a 42-yard touchdown pass to tight end Rob Bennett to make it 24–10, which put the game out of reach. With the loss, Maryland was dropped from the Associated Press Top-20 Poll.

=== 1988 ===
#12 West Virginia 55, Maryland 24

The highest-scoring game of the series began with Maryland running back Mike Beasley rushing for two touchdowns in the first four minutes. The Terrapins scored the first by capitalizing on Anthony Browns' fumble on the first play of the game on the West Virginia 11-yard line. The Mountaineers then rallied to score 17 unanswered points in the first half, and their defense limited the Terrapins to just five first downs in the remainder of the opening half. In the second half, West Virginia expanded its lead to a rout, and beat Maryland for the first time since 1983.

=== 2004 Gator Bowl ===
#23 Maryland 41, #20 West Virginia 7

At the end of the 2003 season, #20 West Virginia and #23 Maryland met at a bowl game for the first time. Terrapins quarterback Scott McBrien, who had transferred from West Virginia, ran for one and threw three touchdowns. Explosive specialist and wide receiver Steve Suter returned a WV punt 76 yards for a touchdown, and all-time ACC scoring leader Nick Novak hit two field goals. In what was a rematch from an earlier regular season game that the Terrapins won 34–7, the result was even more lopsided as Maryland won 41–7.

== Game results ==
Maryland victories	West Virginia victories	Tie games

No.	Date	Location	Winner	Score
1	October 18, 1919	Morgantown, WV	West Virginia	27–0
2	October 16, 1943	Morgantown, WV	West Virginia	6–2
3	October 14, 1944	College Park, MD	Tie	6–6
4	October 27, 1945	Morgantown, WV	Tie	13–13
5	November 1, 1947	College Park, MD	Maryland	27–0
6	November 27, 1948	Morgantown, WV	West Virginia	16–14
7	November 24, 1949	College Park, MD	Maryland	47–7
8	November 18, 1950	Morgantown, WV	Maryland	41–0
9	November 24, 1951	College Park, MD	#4 Maryland	54–7
10	September 19, 1959	College Park, MD	Maryland	27–7
11	September 17, 1960	Morgantown, WV	Maryland	31–8
12	October 15, 1966	College Park, MD	Maryland	28–9
13	September 20, 1969	Morgantown, WV	West Virginia	31–7
14	November 28, 1970	College Park, MD	West Virginia	20–10
15	September 15, 1973	College Park, MD	West Virginia	20–13
16	September 18, 1976	Morgantown, WV	Maryland	24–3
17	September 17, 1977	College Park, MD	West Virginia	24–16
18	September 20, 1980	Morgantown, WV	Maryland	14–11
19	September 19, 1981	College Park, MD	West Virginia	17–13
20	September 18, 1982	Morgantown, WV	#17 West Virginia	19–18
21	September 17, 1983	College Park, MD	#20 West Virginia	31–21
22	September 22, 1984	Morgantown, WV	Maryland	20–17
23	September 21, 1985	College Park, MD	Maryland	28–0
24	September 20, 1986	Morgantown, WV	Maryland	24–3
25	September 19, 1987	College Park, MD	Maryland	25–20
26	September 17, 1988	Morgantown, WV	West Virginia	55–24
27	September 9, 1989	College Park, MD	#17 West Virginia	14–10

No.	Date	Location	Winner	Score
28	September 8, 1990	Morgantown, WV	Maryland	14–10
29	September 21, 1991	College Park, MD	West Virginia	37–7
30	September 19, 1992	Morgantown, WV	West Virginia	34–33
31	September 18, 1993	College Park, MD	West Virginia	42–37
32	September 17, 1994	Morgantown, WV	Maryland	24–13
33	September 16, 1995	College Park, MD	Maryland	31–17
34	September 28, 1996	Morgantown, WV	#23 West Virginia	13–0
35	October 11, 1997	College Park, MD	West Virginia	31–14
36	September 19, 1998	Morgantown, WV	#19 West Virginia	42–20
37	September 18, 1999	College Park, MD	Maryland	33–0
38	September 16, 2000	Morgantown, WV	West Virginia	30–17
39	September 29, 2001	College Park, MD	Maryland	32–20
40	October 5, 2002	Morgantown, WV	Maryland	48–17
41	September 20, 2003	College Park, MD	Maryland	34–7
42	January 1, 2004	Jacksonville, FL	#23 Maryland	41–7
43	September 18, 2004	Morgantown, WV	#8 West Virginia	19–16
44	September 17, 2005	College Park, MD	West Virginia	31–19
45	September 14, 2006	Morgantown, WV	#5 West Virginia	45–24
46	September 13, 2007	College Park, MD	#4 West Virginia	31–14
47	September 18, 2010	Morgantown, WV	#21 West Virginia	31–17
48	September 17, 2011	College Park, MD	#18 West Virginia	37–31
49	September 22, 2012	Morgantown, WV	#8 West Virginia	31–21
50	September 21, 2013	Baltimore, MD	Maryland	37–0
51	September 13, 2014	College Park, MD	West Virginia	40–37
52	September 26, 2015	Morgantown, WV	West Virginia	45–6
53	September 4, 2021	College Park, MD	Maryland	30–24
Series: West Virginia leads 28–23–2

== See also ==
- List of NCAA college football rivalry games
