= List of Maryland Terrapins bowl games =

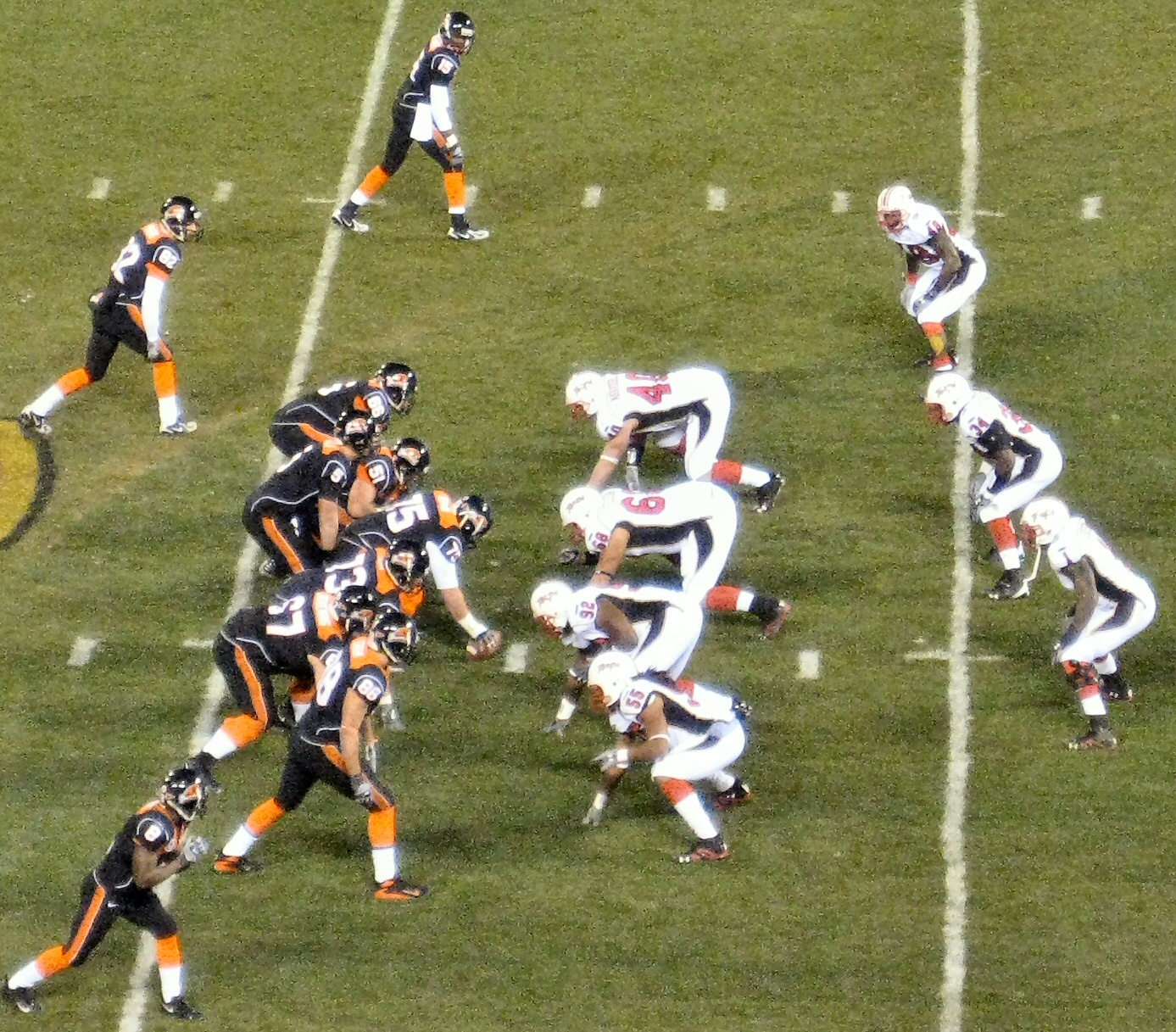
On defense during the 2007 Emerald Bowl

The Maryland Terrapins college football team competes as part of the NCAA Division I Football Bowl Subdivision (FBS), representing the University of Maryland, College Park in the Eastern Division of the Big Ten Conference. Since the establishment of the team in 1892, Maryland has appeared in 30 bowl games. Included in these games are three appearances in the Orange Bowl, one in the Sugar Bowl and one Bowl Championship Series (BCS) game appearance in the 2002 Orange Bowl. The latest bowl occurred on December 30, 2023, when Maryland beat the Auburn Tigers 31–13 in the Music City Bowl. The win brought the Terrapins overall bowl record to 15–14–2.

== Key ==
General
†	Bowl game record attendance
‡	Former bowl game record attendance

Results
W	Win
L	Loss
T	Tie

== Bowl games ==
List of bowl games showing bowl played in, score, date, season, opponent, stadium, location, attendance and head coach (Note: Statistics correct as of 2016–17 NCAA football bowl games.)
#	Bowl	Score (Note: Results are sortable first by whether the result was a Maryland win, loss or tie and then second by the margin of victory.)	Date	Season (Note: Links to the season article for the Maryland team that competed in the bowl for that year.)	Opponent (Note: Links to the season article for the opponent that Maryland competed against in the bowl for that year when available or to their general page when unavailable.)	Stadium	Location	Attendance	Head coach
1	Gator Bowl	T 20–20	January 1, 1948	1947	Georgia Bulldogs	Gator Bowl Stadium	Jacksonville	16,666^{‡}	Jim Tatum
2	Gator Bowl	W 20–7	January 2, 1950	1949	Missouri Tigers	Gator Bowl Stadium	Jacksonville	18,409	Jim Tatum
3	Sugar Bowl	W 28–13	January 1, 1952	1951	Tennessee Volunteers	Tulane Stadium	New Orleans	82,000	Jim Tatum
4	Orange Bowl	L 7–0	January 1, 1954	1953	Oklahoma Sooners	Orange Bowl	Miami	68,640^{‡}	Jim Tatum
5	Orange Bowl	L 20–6	January 2, 1956	1955	Oklahoma Sooners	Orange Bowl	Miami	76,561^{‡}	Jim Tatum
6	Peach Bowl	L 17–16	December 28, 1973	1973	Georgia Bulldogs	Atlanta Stadium	Atlanta	38,107	Jerry Claiborne
7	Liberty Bowl	L 7–3	December 16, 1974	1974	Tennessee Volunteers	Memphis Memorial Stadium	Memphis	51,284	Jerry Claiborne
8	Gator Bowl	W 13–0	December 29, 1975	1975	Florida Gators	Gator Bowl Stadium	Jacksonville	64,012	Jerry Claiborne
9	Cotton Bowl Classic	L 30–21	January 1, 1977	1976	Houston Cougars	Cotton Bowl	Dallas	54,500	Jerry Claiborne
10	Hall of Fame Classic	W 17–7	December 22, 1977	1977	Minnesota Golden Gophers	Legion Field	Birmingham	47,000	Jerry Claiborne
11	Sun Bowl	L 42–0	December 23, 1978	1978	Texas Longhorns	Sun Bowl	El Paso	33,122	Jerry Claiborne
12	Tangerine Bowl	L 35–20	December 20, 1980	1980	Florida Gators	Orlando Stadium	Orlando	52,541	Jerry Claiborne
13	Aloha Bowl	L 21–20	December 25, 1982	1982	Washington Huskies	Aloha Stadium	Honolulu	30,055^{‡}	Bobby Ross
14	Florida Citrus Bowl	L 30–23	December 17, 1983	1983	Tennessee Volunteers	Florida Citrus Bowl	Orlando	50,183	Bobby Ross
15	Sun Bowl	W 28–27	December 24, 1984	1984	Tennessee Volunteers	Sun Bowl	El Paso	50,126^{‡}	Bobby Ross
16	Cherry Bowl	W 35–18	December 21, 1985	1985	Syracuse Orangemen	Pontiac Silverdome	Pontiac	51,858	Bobby Ross
17	Independence Bowl	T 34–34	December 15, 1990	1990	Louisiana Tech Bulldogs	Independence Stadium	Shreveport	48,325	Joe Krivak
18	Orange Bowl	L 56–23	January 2, 2002	2001	Florida Gators	Pro Player Stadium	Miami Gardens	73,640	Ralph Friedgen
19	Peach Bowl	W 30–3	December 31, 2002	2002	Tennessee Volunteers	Georgia Dome	Atlanta	68,330	Ralph Friedgen
20	Gator Bowl	W 41–7	January 1, 2004	2003	West Virginia Mountaineers	Alltel Stadium	Jacksonville	78,892	Ralph Friedgen
21	Champs Sports Bowl	W 24–7	December 29, 2006	2006	Purdue Boilermakers	Florida Citrus Bowl	Orlando	40,168	Ralph Friedgen
22	Emerald Bowl	L 21–14	December 28, 2007	2007	Oregon State Beavers	AT&T Park	San Francisco	32,517	Ralph Friedgen
23	Humanitarian Bowl	W 42–35	December 30, 2008	2008	Nevada Wolf Pack	Bronco Stadium	Boise	26,781	Ralph Friedgen
24	Military Bowl	W 51–20	December 29, 2010	2010	East Carolina Pirates	RFK Stadium	Washington, D.C.	38,062^{†}	Ralph Friedgen
25	Military Bowl	L 31–20	December 27, 2013	2013	Marshall Thundering Herd	Navy–Marine Corps Memorial Stadium	Annapolis	30,163	Randy Edsall
26	Foster Farms Bowl	L 45–21	December 30, 2014	2014	Stanford Cardinal	Levi's Stadium	Santa Clara	34,780	Randy Edsall
27	Quick Lane Bowl	L 30-36	December 26, 2016	2016	Boston College Eagles	Ford Field	Detroit	19,117	D. J. Durkin
28	Pinstripe Bowl	W 54–10	December 29, 2021	2021	Virginia Tech	Yankee Stadium	The Bronx	29,693	Mike Locksley
29	Duke’s Mayo Bowl	W 16–12	December 30, 2022	2022	NC State Wolfpack	Bank of America Stadium	Charlotte	37,228	Mike Locksley
30	Music City Bowl	W 31–13	December 30, 2023	2023	Auburn Tigers	Nissan Stadium	Nashville	50,088	Mike Locksley
