= List of Kansas State Wildcats bowl games =

The Kansas State Wildcats football team competes as part of the NCAA Division I Football Bowl Subdivision (FBS), representing the Kansas State University in the Big 12 Conference. Since the establishment of the team in 1896, Kansas State has played in 25 bowl games. This total includes seven appearances in the current "New Year's Six" major bowl games (the Rose, Sugar, Fiesta, Orange, Cotton, and Peach Bowl). The team played in two Fiesta Bowls during the Bowl Championship Series (BCS) era, one Fiesta Bowl during the Bowl Alliance era, and three Cotton Bowl appearances prior to it being included in the College Football Playoff.

Kansas State's first bowl game was in 1982, under coach Jim Dickey. The team was defeated by the Wisconsin Badgers in the 1982 Independence Bowl.

== Bowl games ==
List of bowl games showing bowl played in, score, date, season, opponent, stadium, location, attendance and head coach (Note: Statistics correct as of 2017-18 NCAA football bowl games.)
| # | Bowl | Score (Note: Results are sortable first by whether the result was a Kansas State win, loss or tie and then second by the margin of victory.) | Date | Season (Note: Links to the season article for the Kansas State team that competed in the bowl for that year.) | Opponent (Note: Links to the season article for the opponent that Kansas State competed against in the bowl for that year when available or to their general page when unavailable.) | Opp. Conference | Stadium | Location | Attendance | Head coach |
|---|---|---|---|---|---|---|---|---|---|---|
| 1 | Independence Bowl | L 3–14 | December 11, 1982 | 1982 | Wisconsin Badgers | Big Ten | Independence Stadium | Shreveport, Louisiana | 49,523 | Jim Dickey |
| 2 | Copper Bowl | W 52–17 | December 29, 1993 | 1993 | Wyoming Cowboys | WAC | Arizona Stadium | Tucson, Arizona | 49,075 | Bill Snyder |
| 3 | Aloha Bowl | L 7–12 | December 25, 1994 | 1994 | Boston College Eagles | Big East | Aloha Stadium | Honolulu, HI | 44,862 | Bill Snyder |
| 4 | Holiday Bowl | W 54–21 | December 29, 1995 | 1995 | Colorado State Rams | WAC | Jack Murphy Stadium | San Diego | 51,051 | Bill Snyder |
| 5 | Cotton Bowl | L 15–19 | January 1, 1997 | 1996 | BYU Cougars | WAC | Cotton Bowl | Dallas | 71,928 | Bill Snyder |
| 6 | Fiesta Bowl | W 35–18 | December 31, 1997 | 1997 | Syracuse Orangemen | Big East | Sun Devil Stadium | Tempe, Arizona | 69,367 | Bill Snyder |
| 7 | Alamo Bowl | L 34–37 | December 29, 1998 | 1998 | Purdue Boilermakers | Big Ten | Alamodome | San Antonio | 60,780 | Bill Snyder |
| 8 | Holiday Bowl | W 24–20 | December 29, 1999 | 1999 | Washington Huskies | Pac-10 | Qualcomm Stadium | San Diego | 57,118 | Bill Snyder |
| 9 | Cotton Bowl | W 35–21 | January 1, 2001 | 2000 | Tennessee Volunteers | SEC | Cotton Bowl | Dallas | 63,465 | Bill Snyder |
| 10 | Insight.com Bowl | L 3–26 | December 29, 2001 | 2001 | Syracuse Orangemen | Big East | Bank One Ballpark | Phoenix, Arizona | 40,028 | Bill Snyder |
| 11 | Holiday Bowl | W 34–27 | December 27, 2002 | 2002 | Arizona State Sun Devils | Pac–10 | Qualcomm Stadium | San Diego | 58,717 | Bill Snyder |
| 12 | Fiesta Bowl | L 28–35 | January 2, 2004 | 2003 | Ohio State Buckeyes | Big Ten | Sun Devil Stadium | Tempe, Arizona | 73,425 | Bill Snyder |
| 13 | Texas Bowl | L 10–37 | December 28, 2006 | 2006 | Rutgers Scarlet Knights | Big East | Reliant Stadium | Houston | 52,210 | Ron Prince |
| 14 | Pinstripe Bowl | L 34–36 | December 30, 2010 | 2010 | Syracuse Orangemen | Big East | Yankee Stadium | New York City | 38,274 | Bill Snyder |
| 15 | Cotton Bowl | L 16–29 | January 6, 2012 | 2011 | Arkansas Razorbacks | SEC | Cowboys Stadium | Arlington, Texas | 80,956 | Bill Snyder |
| 16 | Fiesta Bowl | L 17–35 | January 3, 2013 | 2012 | Oregon Ducks | Pac–12 | University of Phoenix Stadium | Glendale, Arizona | 70,242 | Bill Snyder |
| 17 | Buffalo Wild Wings Bowl | W 31–14 | December 28, 2013 | 2013 | Michigan Wolverines | Big Ten | Sun Devil Stadium | Tempe, Arizona | 53,284 | Bill Snyder |
| 18 | Alamo Bowl | L 35–40 | January 2, 2015 | 2014 | UCLA Bruins | Pac–12 | Alamodome | San Antonio | 60,517 | Bill Snyder |
| 19 | Liberty Bowl | L 23–45 | January 2, 2016 | 2015 | Arkansas Razorbacks | SEC | Liberty Bowl Memorial Stadium | Memphis, Tennessee | 61,136 | Bill Snyder |
| 20 | Texas Bowl | W 33–28 | December 28, 2016 | 2016 | Texas A&M Aggies | SEC | NRG Stadium | Houston, Texas | 68,412 | Bill Snyder |
| 21 | Cactus Bowl | W 35–17 | December 26, 2017 | 2017 | UCLA Bruins | Pac-12 | Chase Field | Phoenix, Arizona | 32,859 | Bill Snyder |
| 22 | Liberty Bowl | L 17–20 | December 31, 2019 | 2019 | Navy Midshipmen | AAC | Liberty Bowl Memorial Stadium | Memphis, Tennessee | 50,515 | Chris Klieman |
| 23 | Texas Bowl | W 42–20 | January 4, 2022 | 2021 | LSU Tigers | SEC | NRG Stadium | Houston, Texas | 52,207 | Chris Klieman |
| 24 | Sugar Bowl | L 20–45 | December 31, 2022 | 2022 | Alabama Crimson Tide | SEC | Caesars Superdome | New Orleans, Louisiana | 60,437 | Chris Klieman |
| 25 | Pop-Tarts Bowl | W 28–19 | December 28, 2023 | 2023 | NC State Wolfpack | ACC | Camping World Stadium | Orlando, Florida | 31,111 | Chris Klieman |
| 26 | Rate Bowl | W 44–41 | December 26, 2024 | 2024 | Rutgers Scarlet Knights | Big Ten | Chase Field | Phoenix, Arizona | 21,659 | Chris Klieman |

Overall Bowl Record: 12-14

Table reference

== College Division/Other Bowl Games ==
As a supplement to the list, the following games were regular season games that some have considered special and may be confused as a bowl. These games are not considered "bowl games" but are included here as a reference.

- 1992 Coca-Cola Classic vs. Nebraska Cornhuskers (L 38–24)
- 2000 Eddie Robinson Classic vs. Iowa Hawkeyes (W 27–7)
- 2003 BCA Classic vs. California Golden Bears (W 42–28)
- 2021 Allstate Kickoff Classic vs. Stanford Cardinal (W 24–7)
- 2025 Aer Lingus College Football Classic vs. Iowa State Cyclones (L 24-21)
