= List of West Virginia Mountaineers bowl games =

Darryl Talley and Oliver Luck celebrate WVU's 1981 Peach Bowl victory

The West Virginia Mountaineers college football team competes as part of the NCAA Division I Football Bowl Subdivision (FBS), representing the West Virginia University in the Big 12 Conference (Big 12). Since the establishment of the team in 1891, West Virginia University has appeared in 41 bowl games. Included in these games are four appearances in the Peach Bowl, three appearances in the Sugar Bowl, two in the Fiesta Bowl and one in the Orange Bowl. Throughout the history of the program, eleven separate coaches have led the Mountaineers to bowl games with Don Nehlen having the most appearances (13). West Virginia's overall bowl record is 17–24.

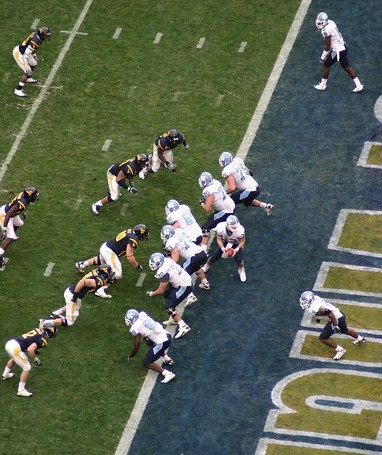
The 2008 Meineke Car Care Bowl between WVU and North Carolina

== Key ==
General
†	Bowl game record attendance
‡	Former bowl game record attendance
*	Interim Head Coach

Results
W	Win
L	Loss

== Bowl games ==
List of bowl games showing bowl played in, score, date, season, opponent, stadium, location, attendance, head coach and MVP (Note: Statistics correct as of 2011–12 NCAA football bowl games.)
#	Bowl	Score (Note: Results are sortable first by whether the result was a West Virginia win, loss or tie and then second by the margin of victory.)	Date	Season (Note: Links to the season article for the West Virginia team that competed in the bowl for that year.)	Opponent (Note: Links to the season article for the opponent that West Virginia competed against in the bowl for that year when available or to their general page when unavailable.)	Stadium	Location	Attendance	Head coach	MVP
1	San Diego East-West Christmas Classic	W 21–13	December 25, 1922	1922	Gonzaga Bulldogs	Balboa Stadium	San Diego	N/A	Clarence Spears	–
2	Sun Bowl	W 7–6	January 1, 1938	1937	Texas Tech Red Raiders	Kidd Field	El Paso	12,000^{‡}	Marshall Glenn	–
3	Sun Bowl	W 21–12	January 1, 1949	1948	Texas Mines Miners	Kidd Field	El Paso	13,000	Dudley DeGroot	–
4	Sugar Bowl	L 19–42	January 1, 1954	1953	No. 8 Georgia Tech Yellow Jackets	Tulane Stadium	New Orleans	76,000	Art Lewis	–
5	Liberty Bowl	L 6–32	December 19, 1964	1964	Utah Utes	Boardwalk Hall	Atlantic City	6,059^{‡}	Gene Corum	–
6	Peach Bowl	W 14–3	December 30, 1969	1969	South Carolina Gamecocks	Grant Field	Atlanta	48,452^{‡}	Jim Carlen	Eddie Williams (FB)
7	Peach Bowl	L 13–49	December 29, 1972	1972	NC State Wolfpack	Atlanta Stadium	Atlanta	52,671^{‡}	Bobby Bowden	–
8	Peach Bowl	W 13–10	December 31, 1975	1975	NC State Wolfpack	Atlanta Stadium	Atlanta	45,134	Bobby Bowden	Ray Marshall (LB)
9	Peach Bowl	W 26–6	December 31, 1981	1981	Florida Gators	Atlanta–Fulton County Stadium	Atlanta	37,582	Don Nehlen	Mickey Walczack (RB), Don Stemple (DB)
10	Gator Bowl	L 12–31	December 30, 1982	1982	Florida State Seminoles	Gator Bowl	Jacksonville	80,913^{‡}	Don Nehlen	Paul Woodside (K)
11	Hall of Fame Classic Bowl	W 20–16	December 22, 1983	1983	Kentucky Wildcats	Legion Field	Birmingham	42,000	Don Nehlen	Jeff Hostetler (QB)
12	Bluebonnet Bowl	W 31–14	December 31, 1984	1984	TCU Horned Frogs	Astrodome	Houston	43,260	Don Nehlen	Willie Drewrey (WR)
13	Sun Bowl	L 33–35	December 25, 1987	1987	No. 11 Oklahoma State Cowboys	Sun Bowl	El Paso	43,240	Don Nehlen	–
14	Fiesta Bowl	L 21–34	January 2, 1989	1988	No. 1 Notre Dame Fighting Irish	Sun Devil Stadium	Tempe	74,911^{‡}	Don Nehlen	–
15	Gator Bowl	L 7–27	December 30, 1989	1989	No. 14 Clemson Tigers	Gator Bowl	Jacksonville	82,911^{‡}	Don Nehlen	Mike Fox (LB)
16	Sugar Bowl	L 7–41	January 1, 1994	1993	No. 8 Florida Gators	Louisiana Superdome	New Orleans	75,437	Don Nehlen	–
17	Carquest Bowl (Note: The Champs Sports Bowl has been known as: the Blockbuster Bowl (1990–1993); Carquest Bowl (1994–1997); Micron PC Bowl (1998); MicronPC.com Bowl (1999–2000); Visit Florida Tangerine Bowl (2001); Mazda Tangerine Bowl (2002–2003); Champs Sports Bowl (since 2004).)	L 21–24	January 2, 1995	1994	South Carolina Gamecocks	Joe Robbie Stadium (Note: Originally called Joe Robbie Stadium, in 1996 it was renamed Pro Player Stadium after naming rights were sold, and it retained the Pro Player moniker through the 2005 season. Today it is known as Sun Life Stadium.)	Miami Gardens	50,833	Don Nehlen	–
18	Gator Bowl	L 13–20	January 1, 1997	1996	No. 12 North Carolina Tar Heels	Alltel Stadium (Note: Originally called Alltel Stadium (1997–2006) and Jacksonville Municipal Stadium (1995–1996, 2007–2009), in 2010 it was renamed EverBank Field.)	Jacksonville	52,103	Don Nehlen	David Saunders (WR)
19	Carquest Bowl	L 30–35	December 29, 1997	1997	Georgia Tech Yellow Jackets	Pro Player Stadium	Miami Gardens	28,262	Don Nehlen	–
20	Insight.com Bowl	L 31–34	December 26, 1998	1998	No. 23 Missouri Tigers	Arizona Stadium	Tucson	36,147	Don Nehlen	Marc Bulger (QB)
21	Music City Bowl	W 49–38	December 28, 2000	2000	Ole Miss Rebels	Adelphia Coliseum	Nashville	47,119	Don Nehlen	Brad Lewis (QB)
22	Continental Tire Bowl (Note: The Belk Bowl has been known as: the Continental Tire Bowl (2002–2004) and the Meineke Car Care Bowl (2005–2010).)	L 22–48	December 28, 2002	2002	Virginia Cavaliers	Ericsson Stadium (Note: Originally called Ericsson Stadium, in 2004 it was renamed Bank of America Stadium.)	Charlotte	73,535^{‡}	Rich Rodriguez	–
23	Gator Bowl	L 7–41	January 1, 2004	2003	No. 23 Maryland Terrapins	Alltel Stadium	Jacksonville	78,892	Rich Rodriguez	Brian King (DB)
24	Gator Bowl	L 18–30	January 1, 2005	2004	No. 17 Florida State Seminoles	Alltel Stadium	Jacksonville	70,112	Rich Rodriguez	Kay-Jay Harris (RB)
25	Sugar Bowl (Note: The 2006 Sugar Bowl was played at the Georgia Dome in Atlanta due to lingering effects of Hurricane Katrina in New Orleans and the Louisiana Superdome.)	W 38–35	January 2, 2006	2005	No. 8 Georgia Bulldogs	Georgia Dome	Atlanta	74,458	Rich Rodriguez	Steve Slaton (RB)
26	Gator Bowl	W 38–35	January 1, 2007	2006	Georgia Tech Yellow Jackets	Jacksonville Municipal Stadium	Jacksonville	67,704	Rich Rodriguez	Pat White (QB)
27	Fiesta Bowl	W 48–28	January 2, 2008	2007	No. 3 Oklahoma Sooners	University of Phoenix Stadium	Glendale	70,016	Bill Stewart*	Pat White (QB), Reed Williams (LB)
28	Meineke Car Care Bowl	W 31–30	December 27, 2008	2008	North Carolina Tar Heels	Bank of America Stadium	Charlotte	73,712^{†}	Bill Stewart	Pat White (QB)
29	Gator Bowl	L 21–33	January 1, 2010	2009	Florida State Seminoles	Jacksonville Municipal Stadium	Jacksonville	84,129^{†}	Bill Stewart	Noel Devine (RB)
30	Champs Sports Bowl	L 7–23	December 28, 2010	2010	NC State Wolfpack	Florida Citrus Bowl	Orlando	48,962	Bill Stewart	–
31	Orange Bowl	W 70–33	January 4, 2012	2011	No. 14 Clemson Tigers	Sun Life Stadium	Miami Gardens	67,563	Dana Holgorsen	Geno Smith (QB)
32	Pinstripe Bowl	L 14–38	December 29, 2012	2012	Syracuse Orange	Yankee Stadium	Bronx	39,098^{‡}	Dana Holgorsen	–
33	Liberty Bowl	L 37–45	December 29, 2014	2014	Texas A&M Aggies	Liberty Bowl Stadium	Memphis	51,282	Dana Holgorsen	–
34	Cactus Bowl	W 43–42	January 2, 2016	2015	Arizona State Sun Devils	Chase Field	Phoenix	39,321	Dana Holgorsen	Skyler Howard (QB), Shaq Petteway (LB)
35	Russell Athletic Bowl	L 14–31	December 28, 2016	2016	Miami Hurricanes	Camping World Stadium	Orlando	48,625	Dana Holgorsen	–
36	Heart of Dallas Bowl	L 14–30	December 26, 2017	2017	Utah Utes	Cotton Bowl	Dallas	20,507	Dana Holgorsen	–
37	Camping World Bowl	L 18–34	December 28, 2018	2018	No. 17 Syracuse Orange	Camping World Stadium	Orlando	41,125	Dana Holgorsen	–
38	Liberty Bowl	W 24–21	December 31, 2020	2020	Army Black Knights	Liberty Bowl Memorial Stadium	Memphis	8,187	Neal Brown	T. J. Simmons (WR)
39	Guaranteed Rate Bowl	L 6–18	December 28, 2021	2021	Minnesota Golden Gophers	Chase Field	Phoenix	21,220	Neal Brown	–
40	Duke's Mayo Bowl	W 30–10	December 27, 2023	2023	North Carolina Tar Heels	Bank of America Stadium	Charlotte	42,925	Neal Brown	Garrett Greene (QB)
41	Frisco Bowl	L 37–42	December 17, 2024	2024	Memphis Tigers	Toyota Stadium	Frisco	12,022	Chad Scott	–
