= List of UMass Minutemen bowl games =

The UMass Minutemen college football team competes as part of the National Collegiate Athletic Association (NCAA) Division I Football Bowl Subdivision (FBS), representing the University of Massachusetts Amherst as an Independent. UMass began play in 1879 and have since appeared in two major bowl games. As they spent most of their existence since the late 1970s as a Football Championship Subdivision program, they participated in the DI-AA/FCS playoffs rather than postseason bowl games. In 2013, the team once again became eligible for bowl games upon the completion of their transition to FBS.

== Bowl games ==
#	Bowl	Score	Date	Season	Opponent	Stadium	Location	Attendance	Head coach
1	Tangerine Bowl	L 14–13	December 12, 1964	1964	East Carolina	Tangerine Bowl	Orlando	8,000	Vic Fusia
2	Boardwalk Bowl	W 35–14	December 9, 1972	1972	UC Davis	Atlantic City Convention Center	Atlantic City	2,857	Dick MacPherson
