= List of San Jose State Spartans bowl games =

The San Jose State Spartans college football team competes as part of the National Collegiate Athletic Association (NCAA) Division I Football Bowl Subdivision (FBS), representing the San Jose State University in the Mountain West Conference. Since the establishment of the team in 1898, San Jose State has appeared in 14 bowl games, including four appearances in the California Bowl. Their latest bowl appearance was the 2024 Hawaii Bowl, where San Jose State lost to the South Florida Bulls, 39–41 in five overtime periods, to give the Spartans an overall bowl record of 7–7.

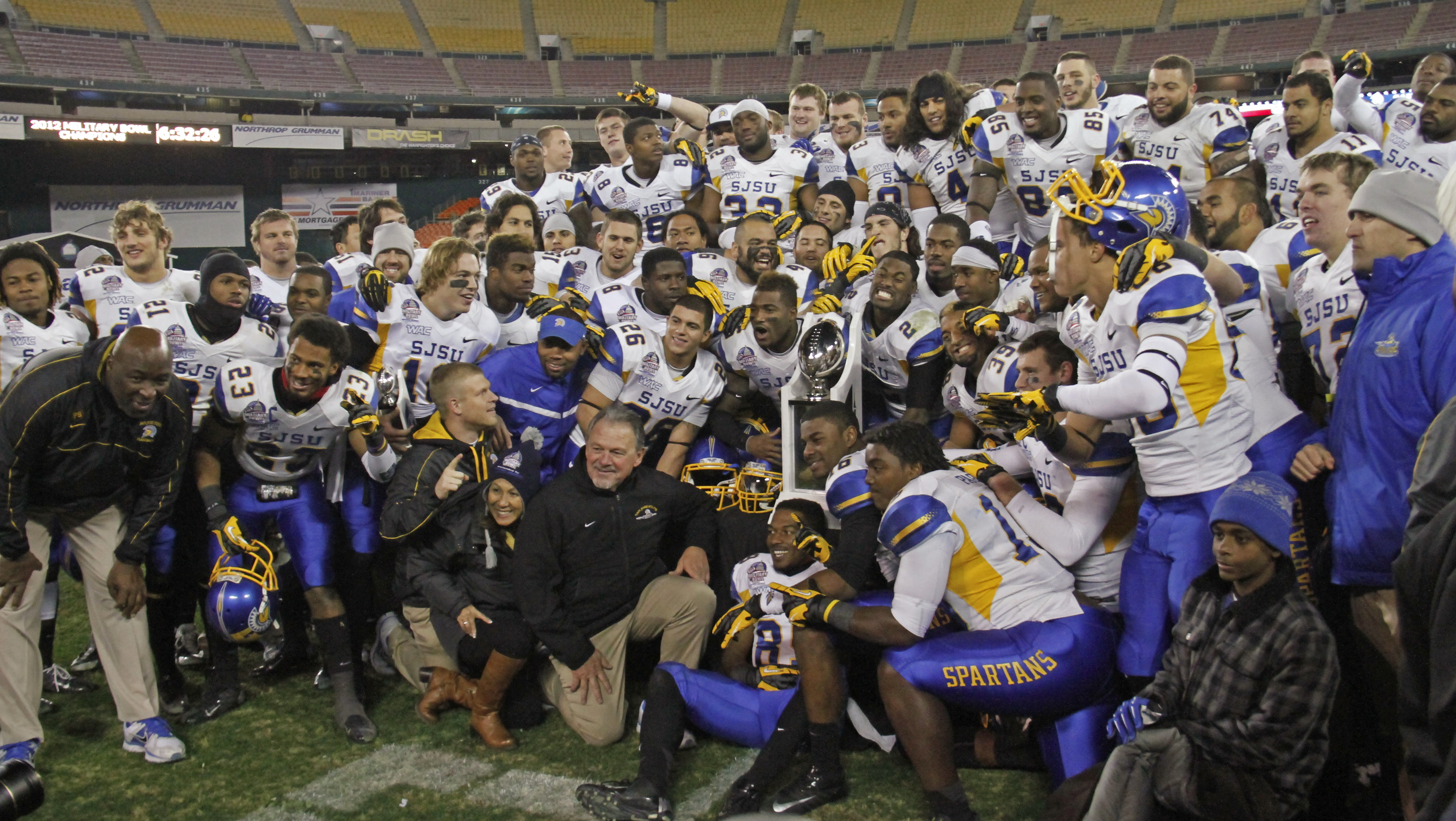
The Spartans pose with the trophy at the 2012 Military Bowl

== Key ==
General
†	Bowl game record attendance
‡	Former bowl game record attendance

Results
W	Win
L	Loss

== Bowl games ==
List of bowl games showing bowl played in, score, date, season, opponent, stadium, location, attendance and head coach
#	Bowl	Score	Date	Season	Opponent	Stadium	Location	Attendance	Head coach
1	Raisin Bowl	W 20–0	January 1, 1947	1946	Utah State Aggies	Ratcliffe Stadium	Fresno, CA	13,000^{†}	Bill Hubbard
2	Raisin Bowl	W 20–13	December 31, 1949	1949	Texas Tech Red Raiders	Ratcliffe Stadium	Fresno, CA	9,000	Bill Hubbard
3	Pasadena Bowl	L 9–28	December 18, 1971	1971	Memphis State Tigers	Rose Bowl	Pasadena, CA	15,244	Dewey King
4	California Bowl	L 25–27	December 19, 1981	1981	Toledo Rockets	Bulldog Stadium	Fresno, CA	15,565^{‡}	Jack Elway
5	California Bowl	W 37–7	December 13, 1986	1986	Miami Redskins	Bulldog Stadium	Fresno, CA	10,743	Claude Gilbert
6	California Bowl	L 27–30	December 12, 1987	1987	Eastern Michigan Hurons	Bulldog Stadium	Fresno, CA	24,000	Claude Gilbert
7	California Bowl	W 48–24	December 8, 1990	1990	Central Michigan Chippewas	Bulldog Stadium	Fresno, CA	25,431	Terry Shea
8	New Mexico Bowl	W 20–12	December 23, 2006	2006	New Mexico Lobos	University Stadium	Albuquerque, NM	34,111^{†}	Dick Tomey
9	Military Bowl	W 29–20	December 27, 2012	2012	Bowling Green Falcons	Robert F. Kennedy Memorial Stadium	Washington, D.C.	17,835	Mike MacIntyre
10	Cure Bowl	W 27–16	December 19, 2015	2015	Georgia State Panthers	Orlando Citrus Bowl	Orlando, FL	18,536^{‡}	Ron Caragher
11	Arizona Bowl	L 13–34	December 31, 2020	2020	Ball State Cardinals	Arizona Stadium	Tucson, AZ	0	Brent Brennan
12	Famous Idaho Potato Bowl	L 27–41	December 20, 2022	2022	Eastern Michigan Eagles	Albertsons Stadium	Boise, ID	10,122	Brent Brennan
13	Hawaii Bowl	L 14–24	December 23, 2023	2023	Coastal Carolina Chanticleers	Clarence T. C. Ching Athletics Complex	Honolulu, HI	7,089	Brent Brennan
14	Hawaii Bowl	L 39–41^{(5OT)}	December 24, 2024	2024	South Florida Bulls	Clarence T. C. Ching Athletics Complex	Honolulu, HI	6,720	Ken Niumatalolo
