= Steve Suter =

American gridiron football player (born 1982)

No. 34
- Positions: Wide receiver, return specialist

Personal information
- Born: June 26, 1982 (age 44); Manchester, Maryland, U.S.
- Listed height: 5 ft 9 in (1.75 m)
- Listed weight: 194 lb (88 kg)

Career information
- College: Maryland

Career history
- 2005: Hamilton Tiger-Cats

Awards and highlights
- 2002 All-American second-team; 2× First-team All-ACC (2002, 2003); Iron Terp (school weight-lifting award); Records: NCAA: single-season kick returns (78); NCAA: single-season punt returns (56)^{†}; NCAA: single-season punt return touchdowns (4, tied)^{‡}; ACC: career punt return touchdowns (6); ACC: career punt return yards (1,271); ACC: single-season punt returns (56); ACC: single-season punt return touchdowns (4); ACC: single-season punt return yards (771); †: Broken in 2002 by Wes Welker, Texas Tech ‡: Broken in 2004 by Chad Owens, Hawaii Sources

Steve Suter (born June 26, 1982) is an American former football player. He played as a wide receiver and return specialist for the Maryland Terrapins and also briefly played Canadian football for the Hamilton Tiger-Cats. He gained fame for his explosive returning ability and elusiveness. Despite Suter's career being plagued and finally cut short by injuries, he set multiple NCAA, conference, and school records.

== Early life ==
Steve Suter was born in Manchester, Maryland, the son of George and Lynn Suter. He attended North Carroll High School in Hampstead, Maryland, where he rushed for over 4,000 career yards. During his senior year in 1999, he rushed for 1,748 yards (1.6 km) and 19 touchdowns. He was ranked #8 in the state of Maryland for rushing and named as a USA Today honorable mention All-American, Prepstar all-region, first-team all-state, and Baltimore Sun All-Metro player.

== College career ==
Suter spent his freshman year in 2000 on redshirt status. In 2001, he saw minor action in the first four games before breaking an index finger.

In 2002, Suter played in all 14 games as a first-string slot receiver and started in the 2003 Peach Bowl as an X-receiver. Suter returned four punts for touchdowns: against Akron (81 yards (ca. 74 m)), West Virginia (80 yards (ca. 73 m)), Duke (63 yards (ca. 58 m)), and North Carolina (77 yards (ca. 70 m)). He was twice selected as the ACC Specialist of the Week for his performances at Duke and North Carolina. On his second career carry, he scored on a 61-yard run against N.C. State and was named as the ACC Offensive Back of the Week. Against Eastern Michigan, Suter's career-first touchdown reception was from Scott McBrien for 91 yards (ca. 83 m), which was one yard shy of the school record 92-yard reception set by Ed Bolton and Stan Lavine in 1949. During the Peach Bowl against Tennessee, he made his first career start as a receiver and returned a punt and shook four tackles to pick up 79-yards.

Suter set the NCAA records for single-season punt returns with 56, kick returns with 78, punt return yards with 778, and tied the NCAA record for punt return touchdowns. The Sporting News and CNN Sports Illustrated named him to the All-American second-team, and the conference named him to the All-ACC first-team as a return specialist.

In 2003, Suter started in 10 games and played in two more, much of the time battling a lateral meniscus tear in his left knee. He returned two punts for touchdowns: against The Citadel he broke two tackles for a 75-yard score, and in the 2004 Gator Bowl he ran 77-yards for a touchdown against West Virginia. During that game, he also earned the number-one spot on the ESPN SportsCenter "Play of the Day" feature, for a diving reception in which he tipped the ball before pulling it in as he fell to the ground in a tangle with cornerback Lance Frazier. Suter was again named to the All-ACC first-team as a specialist in 2003. Suter also set records in the weight room: he broke the school's all-time wide receiver highs for strength index (768), squat (580-lb), clean (352-lb), and vertical jump (42-in).

Suter had a solid, though not extraordinary, 2004 season during a down year for the Terps. He accumulated 270 receiving, 163 return, and 31 rushing yards. His drop-off in performance can be attributed to his knee injury in particular, which reduced his quickness. He broke the ACC record for career punt return yards with 1,271.

During his college career, Suter accumulated 10 touchdowns, six of which were on punt returns. He was one punt return touchdown shy of making the all-time NCAA record a four-way tie. He also suffered several injuries which required five surgeries, four of which were on his knees. Suter never fair caught a ball, and said in 2002, "I don't see the need for fair catches ... If someone is in my face, I'll catch it and fall forward for 2 yards (1.83 m), and we've got 2 yards (1.83 m) we didn't have if I had fair-caught it."

=== Statistics ===
Maryland		Receiving					Rushing					Returning
Season	Games	Rec	Yds	Avg	Lg	TD	Att	Yds	Avg	Lg	TD	Punt	Yds	Lg	TD	Kick	Yds	Lg	TD
2001	4											1	3	3	0	0	0	0	0
2002	14	17	303	17.8	91	2	5	82	16.4	64	1	56	771	81	4	22	546	58	0
2003	12	29	471	16.2	45	1	7	58	8.3	24	0	37	334	76	2	15	351	67	0
2004	9	23	270	11.7	43	0	5	31	6.2	15	0	27	163	36	0	15	362	52	0
Career	39	69	1,044	15.1	91	3	17	171	10.1	64	1	121	1,271	81	6	52	1,259	67	0

== Professional career ==
Undersized even for college football, Suter was passed over in the 2005 NFL draft. He attended the Washington Redskins try-outs before signing as a free-agent for the Hamilton Tiger-Cats of the Canadian Football League on 16 May 2005.

With the Tiger-Cats, Suter saw action in just two games. While in the CFL, he returned four kick-offs for 112 yards, four punts for 16 yards, and a missed field goal attempt for 20 yards. He injured his shoulder during the season-opener against the Montreal Alouettes and subsequently missed the next five games. In his second game, he broke his collar bone against the Winnipeg Blue Bombers. After the 2006 training camp, he was released from the team due to his injuries.

== Coaching career ==
After the end of his playing career, Suter returned home and took a job at the Scott McBrien Passing Academy in Rockville, Maryland. At the training camp, he is a wide receivers coach for youth and high school players. There, he works alongside former Maryland teammates Scott McBrien and Scooter Monroe. The eponymous football camp was founded by former quarterback McBrien who stated, "A lot of kids who aren't necessarily that big [in size] or well known don't get looks from college coaches ... Lots of these kids have the talent to be very successful at the college level and we're trying to promote that ... We're trying to help kids in Steve [Suter]'s position."
