= List of Wisconsin Badgers bowl games =

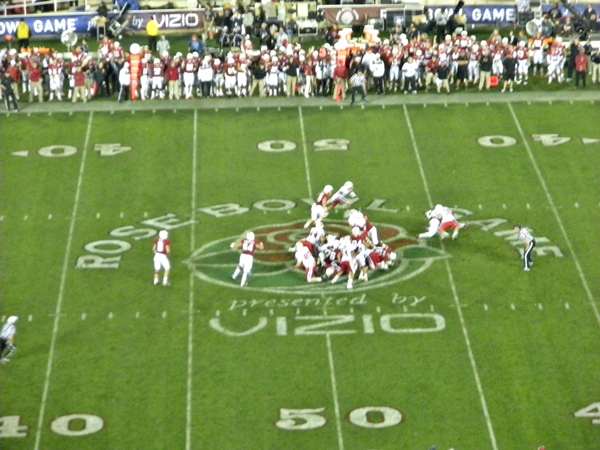
50-yard line action during the 2013 Rose Bowl against Stanford

The Wisconsin Badgers college football team competes as part of the NCAA Division I Football Bowl Subdivision (FBS), representing the University of Wisconsin–Madison in the West Division of the Big Ten Conference.

Since the establishment of the team in 1889, Wisconsin has appeared in 35 bowl games. Included in these games are ten appearances in the Rose Bowl Game with only three victories, five Bowl Championship Series (BCS) game appearances, and three New Years Six Bowls in the Cotton Bowl, Rose Bowl and Orange Bowl. They have appeared in bowl games 28 of the last 30 seasons, including a streak of 22 consecutive bowl appearances that ended with the 2024 season under coach Luke Fickell. Through the history of the program, seven separate coaches have led the Badgers to bowl games, with Barry Alvarez having the most appearances at thirteen.

== Bowl games ==
Results
W	Win
L	Loss

List of bowl games showing bowl played in, score, date, season, opponent, stadium, location, attendance and head coach
#	Bowl	Score (Note: Results are sortable first by whether the result was a Wisconsin win, loss or tie and then second by the margin of victory.)	Date	Season (Note: Links to the season article for the Wisconsin team that competed in the bowl for that year.)	Opponent (Note: Links to the season article for the opponent that Wisconsin competed against in the bowl for that year when available or to their general page when unavailable.)	Stadium	Location	Attendance	Head coach
1	Rose Bowl	L 7–0	January 1, 1953	1952	USC Trojans	Rose Bowl	Pasadena	101,500	Ivy Williamson
2	Rose Bowl	L 44–8	January 1, 1960	1959	Washington Huskies	Rose Bowl	Pasadena	100,809	Milt Bruhn
3	Rose Bowl	L 42–37	January 1, 1963	1962	USC Trojans	Rose Bowl	Pasadena	98,698	Milt Bruhn
4	Garden State Bowl	L 28–21	December 13, 1981	1981	Tennessee Volunteers	Giants Stadium	East Rutherford	38,782	Dave McClain
5	Independence Bowl	W 14–3	December 11, 1982	1982	Kansas State Wildcats	Independence Stadium	Shreveport	49,503	Dave McClain
6	Hall of Fame Classic Bowl	L 20–19	December 29, 1984	1984	Kentucky Wildcats	Legion Field	Birmingham	47,300	Dave McClain
7	Rose Bowl	W 21–16	January 1, 1994	1993	UCLA Bruins	Rose Bowl	Pasadena	101,237	Barry Alvarez
8	Hall of Fame Bowl	W 34–20	January 2, 1995	1994	Duke Blue Devils	Tampa Stadium	Tampa	61,384	Barry Alvarez
9	Copper Bowl	W 38–10	December 27, 1996	1996	Utah Utes	Arizona Stadium	Tucson	42,122	Barry Alvarez
10	Outback Bowl	L 33–6	January 1, 1998	1997	Georgia Bulldogs	Houlihan's Stadium (Note: Originally called Tampa Stadium, it was renamed Houlihan's Stadium in 1996.)	Tampa	53,161	Barry Alvarez
11	Rose Bowl	W 38–31	January 1, 1999	1998	UCLA Bruins	Rose Bowl	Pasadena	93,872	Barry Alvarez
12	Rose Bowl	W 17–9	January 1, 2000	1999	Stanford Cardinal	Rose Bowl	Pasadena	93,731	Barry Alvarez
13	Sun Bowl	W 21–20	December 29, 2000	2000	UCLA Bruins	Sun Bowl	El Paso	49,093	Barry Alvarez
14	Alamo Bowl	W 31–28 ^{OT}	December 28, 2002	2002	Colorado Buffaloes	Alamodome	San Antonio	50,690	Barry Alvarez
15	Music City Bowl	L 28–14	December 31, 2003	2003	Auburn Tigers	The Coliseum (Note: Venue currently known as Nissan Stadium.)	Nashville	55,109	Barry Alvarez
16	Outback Bowl	L 24–21	January 1, 2005	2004	Georgia Bulldogs	Raymond James Stadium	Tampa	62,414	Barry Alvarez
17	Capital One Bowl	W 24–10	January 2, 2006	2005	Auburn Tigers	Florida Citrus Bowl (Note: Venue currently known as Camping World Stadium.)	Orlando	57,221	Barry Alvarez
18	Capital One Bowl	W 17–14	January 1, 2007	2006	Arkansas Razorbacks	Florida Citrus Bowl	Orlando	60,774	Bret Bielema
19	Outback Bowl	L 21–17	January 1, 2008	2007	Tennessee Volunteers	Raymond James Stadium	Tampa	60,121	Bret Bielema
20	Champs Sports Bowl	L 42–13	December 27, 2008	2008	Florida State Seminoles	Florida Citrus Bowl	Orlando	52,692	Bret Bielema
21	Champs Sports Bowl	W 20–14	December 29, 2009	2009	Miami Hurricanes	Florida Citrus Bowl	Orlando	56,747	Bret Bielema
22	Rose Bowl	L 21–19	January 1, 2011	2010	TCU Horned Frogs	Rose Bowl	Pasadena	94,118	Bret Bielema
23	Rose Bowl	L 45–38	January 2, 2012	2011	Oregon Ducks	Rose Bowl	Pasadena	91,245	Bret Bielema
24	Rose Bowl	L 20–14	January 1, 2013	2012	Stanford Cardinal	Rose Bowl	Pasadena	93,359	Barry Alvarez (interim)
25	Capital One Bowl	L 34–24	January 1, 2014	2013	South Carolina Gamecocks	Florida Citrus Bowl Stadium	Orlando	56,629	Gary Andersen
26	Outback Bowl	W 34–31 ^{OT}	January 1, 2015	2014	Auburn Tigers	Raymond James Stadium	Tampa	44,023	Barry Alvarez (interim)
27	Holiday Bowl	W 23–21	December 30, 2015	2015	USC Trojans	Qualcomm Stadium (Note: Venue last known as SDCCU Stadium.)	San Diego	48,329	Paul Chryst
28	Cotton Bowl	W 24–16	January 2, 2017	2016	Western Michigan Broncos	AT&T Stadium	Arlington	59,615	Paul Chryst
29	Orange Bowl	W 34–24	December 30, 2017	2017	Miami Hurricanes	Hard Rock Stadium	Miami Gardens	65,032	Paul Chryst
30	Pinstripe Bowl	W 35–3	December 27, 2018	2018	Miami Hurricanes	Yankee Stadium	The Bronx	37,821	Paul Chryst
31	Rose Bowl	L 28–27	January 1, 2020	2019	Oregon Ducks	Rose Bowl	Pasadena	90,462	Paul Chryst
32	Duke's Mayo Bowl	W 42–28	December 30, 2020	2020	Wake Forest Demon Deacons	Bank of America Stadium	Charlotte	1,500	Paul Chryst
33	Las Vegas Bowl	W 20–13	December 30, 2021	2021	Arizona State Sun Devils	Allegiant Stadium	Las Vegas	32,515	Paul Chryst
34	Guaranteed Rate Bowl	W 24–17	December 27, 2022	2022	Oklahoma State Cowboys	Chase Field	Phoenix	23,187	Luke Fickell
35	ReliaQuest Bowl	L 35–31	January 1, 2024	2023	LSU Tigers	Raymond James Stadium	Tampa	31,424	Luke Fickell

== Bowl record ==
The table below lists the bowls in which the Badgers have made multiple appearances.

Team	Times played	Record	Most Recent Appearance
Rose Bowl	10	3–7	2020
ReliaQuest Bowl / Outback Bowl / Hall of Fame Bowl	6	2–4	2024
Citrus Bowl	5	3–2	2014

== Bowl opponent frequency ==
Team	Times played	Record
Auburn	3	2-1
Miami (FL)	3	3-0
UCLA	3	3-0
USC	3	1-2
Georgia	2	0-2
Oregon	2	0-2
Stanford	2	1-1
Tennessee	2	0-2
Arizona State	1	1-0
Arkansas	1	1-0
Colorado	1	1-0
Duke	1	1-0
Florida State	1	0-1
Kansas State	1	1-0
Kentucky	1	0-1
Oklahoma State	1	1-0
South Carolina	1	0-1
Texas Christian	1	0-1
Utah	1	1-0
Wake Forest	1	1-0
Washington	1	0-1
Western Michigan	1	1-0
LSU	1	0-1
