= Scott McBrien =

American gridiron football player (born 1980)

No. 7
- Position: Quarterback

Personal information
- Born: February 14, 1980 (age 46); Rockville, Maryland, U.S.
- Listed height: 6 ft 1 in (1.85 m)
- Listed weight: 182 lb (83 kg)

Career information
- College: Maryland (2001–2003); West Virginia (2000)

Career history
- 2004–2005: Green Bay Packers
- 2005: Rhein Fire
- 2006–2007: Montreal Alouettes

Awards and highlights
- 2002 Peach Bowl MVP; 2004 Gator Bowl MVP; 2003 NCAA 25th-leading pass efficiency; 2003 ACC 2nd-leading pass efficiency

Scott McBrien (born February 14, 1980) is an American former football quarterback. He played football for several professional and college teams, most notably, the Green Bay Packers in the NFL, and the Maryland Terrapins at the University of Maryland. He is currently a color commentator for Big Ten Network football games.

== Early life ==
McBrien was born in Rockville, Maryland to Ernie and Kathleen McBrien. He attended DeMatha Catholic High School in Hyattsville, Maryland. As a senior in 1999, he helped engineer a 13–0 season and a 13th-place USA Today national ranking. That year, he completed 90 out of 131 passes for 1,878 yards and 25 touchdowns without any interceptions. During his high school career, McBrien earned two Washington Post All-Met and two PG Journal all-county honors. In 1999, he was named the Prince George's County Most Valuable Player.

== College career ==
McBrien initially attended college at West Virginia University. In 2000, he played in 10 games, including one start, for the Mountaineers. He completed 42 out of 99 passes for 755 yards, including three touchdowns and three interceptions. In the Backyard Brawl against Pittsburgh, he netted 257 yards and two touchdowns. McBrien replaced Brad Lewis for the final three quarters of the Notre Dame game and threw for 252 yards and a touchdown.

In 2001, after transferring to the University of Maryland, he was required by NCAA rules to sit out for his sophomore season.

In 2002, McBrien started in all 14 games for the Maryland Terrapins. In the season-opener against Akron, he made his first career rushing touchdown and scored again with an eight-yard toss to Derrick Fenner. Against Eastern Michigan, he managed a career-high 300 passing yards for three touchdowns, including a school second-longest touchdown pass to Steve Suter for 91 yards. At his former alma mater, West Virginia, McBrien led the Terps to a 48–17 win highlighted by a 45-yard play action pass to Jafar Williams. At Duke, he rushed for a touchdown and threw a 69-yard pass to Latrez Harrison for a touchdown. McBrien averaged 31.7 yards per completion at North Carolina including an 80-yard touchdown throw to Scooter Monroe. Against #14 N.C. State, he set up the game-winning Nick Novak field goal with a 36-yard completion to Steve Suter. At Clemson, McBrien tied two of his career highs with three touchdown passes and three interceptions. In the 2003 Peach Bowl against Tennessee, he was named the Outstanding Offensive Player of the Game, and ran seven times for 36 yards and two touchdowns. During the season, he placed fifth-best in school history in pass efficiency (141.3) and passing yards (2,497). For the season, McBrien ranked second in the ACC and 12th in the NCAA in pass efficiency.

In 2003, McBrien again led the Terrapins to a win over his former school, West Virginia, 34–7. Against Clemson, he threw for three touchdowns and no interceptions, including a season-long pass to Derrick Fenner for 69 yards and a score. In the North Carolina game, McBrien's career-high four touchdown passes tied for number-six the school single-game record. In what was Maryland's fourth-straight cliffhanger victory over a Philip Rivers-led N.C. State, McBrien guided the Terps to 16 points with 7:00 remaining on the clock. McBrien was also under center for #13 Maryland's shocking 20–13 loss to Northern Illinois to start the season. Maryland finished the regular season with a 9–3 record and secure a spot in the 2004 Gator Bowl to once again face West Virginia. McBrien led Maryland in his third victory over his former alma mater in a 41–7 romp, where he threw for three touchdowns and no interceptions and rushed for another touchdown. He set his career-high with 351 passing yards and was named the 2004 Gator Bowl Most Valuable Player. With 19 passing touchdowns in the 2003 season, McBrien earned the number-three spot in the school record book.

He earned a bachelor's degree from the University of Maryland in criminology and criminal justice.

=== Statistics ===
Maryland		Passing									Rushing
Season	GP	Comp	Att	%	Yds	Avg	TDs	Long	Int	Rating	Att	Yards	Avg	Long	TDs
2002	14	162	284	57.0	2,497	8.8	15	91	10	141.28	88	284	3.2	54	7
2003	13	173	314	55.1	2,672	8.5	19	69	6	142.73	82	259	3.2	43	6
Career	27	335	598	56.0	5,169	8.6	34	91	16	141.5	170	543	3.2	54	13

== Professional career ==
In 2004, McBrien signed as an undrafted free agent with the Green Bay Packers, where he saw action in the pre-season as a back-up behind Brett Favre. Green Bay released McBrien in September 2004, only to re-sign and allocate him to the NFL Europe's Rhein Fire in January 2005, in order to gain experience. After throwing for 13 touchdowns and 12 interceptions with the Fire, McBrien was subsequently released by the Packers.

In 2006, McBrien was signed as a free agent by the Montreal Alouettes of the Canadian Football League (CFL). He played with the Alouettes for two seasons.

== Coaching career ==
After the end of his playing career, McBrien returned to the United States and founded the Scott McBrien Passing Academy in Rockville, Maryland. At the training camp, he is a quarterbacks coach for youth and high school players. There, he works alongside former Maryland teammates Steve Suter and Scooter Monroe.

== Broadcasting career ==
In 2013, McBrien returned to the University of Maryland to become a sideline reporter for Maryland Terrapins football games. He joined Johnny Holliday and Tim Strachan to form the broadcasting team for Maryland football. In 2014 McBrien was hired to provide color commentary for Big Ten Network football games.
