= List of San Diego State Aztecs bowl games =

The San Diego State Aztecs college football team competes in the National Collegiate Athletic Association (NCAA) Division I Football Bowl Subdivision, representing San Diego State University in the Mountain West Conference. Since the team's inaugural season in 1921, San Diego State has appeared in 20 post-season bowl games.

== Bowl appearances ==
Date	Bowl	Opponent	Result
January 1, 1948	Harbor Bowl	Hardin–Simmons	L 0–53
January 1, 1952	Pineapple Bowl	Hawaii	W 34– 13
December 10, 1966	Camellia Bowl	Montana State	W 28–7
December 9, 1967	Camellia Bowl	San Francisco State	W 27–6
December 6, 1969	Pasadena Bowl	Boston University	W 28–7
December 30, 1986	Holiday Bowl	No. 16 Iowa	L 38–39
December 30, 1991	Freedom Bowl	No. 23 Tulsa	L 17–28
December 19, 1998	Las Vegas Bowl	North Carolina	L 13–20
December 23, 2010	Poinsettia Bowl	Navy	W 35–14
December 17, 2011	New Orleans Bowl	Louisiana–Lafayette	L 30–32
December 20, 2012	Poinsettia Bowl	BYU	L 6–23
December 21, 2013	Famous Idaho Potato Bowl	Buffalo	W 49–24
December 23, 2014	Poinsettia Bowl	Navy	L 16–17
December 23, 2015	Hawaii Bowl	Cincinnati	W 42–7
December 17, 2016	Las Vegas Bowl	Houston	W 34–10
December 23, 2017	Armed Forces Bowl	Army	L 35–42
December 19, 2018	Frisco Bowl	Ohio	L 0–27
December 21, 2019	New Mexico Bowl	Central Michigan	W 48–11
December 21, 2021	Frisco Bowl	UTSA	W 38–24
December 24, 2022	Hawaii Bowl	Middle Tennessee	L 23-25
Total	20 bowl games	10–10	543–429

Ranking taken from the AP Poll
