= List of Wyoming Cowboys bowl games =

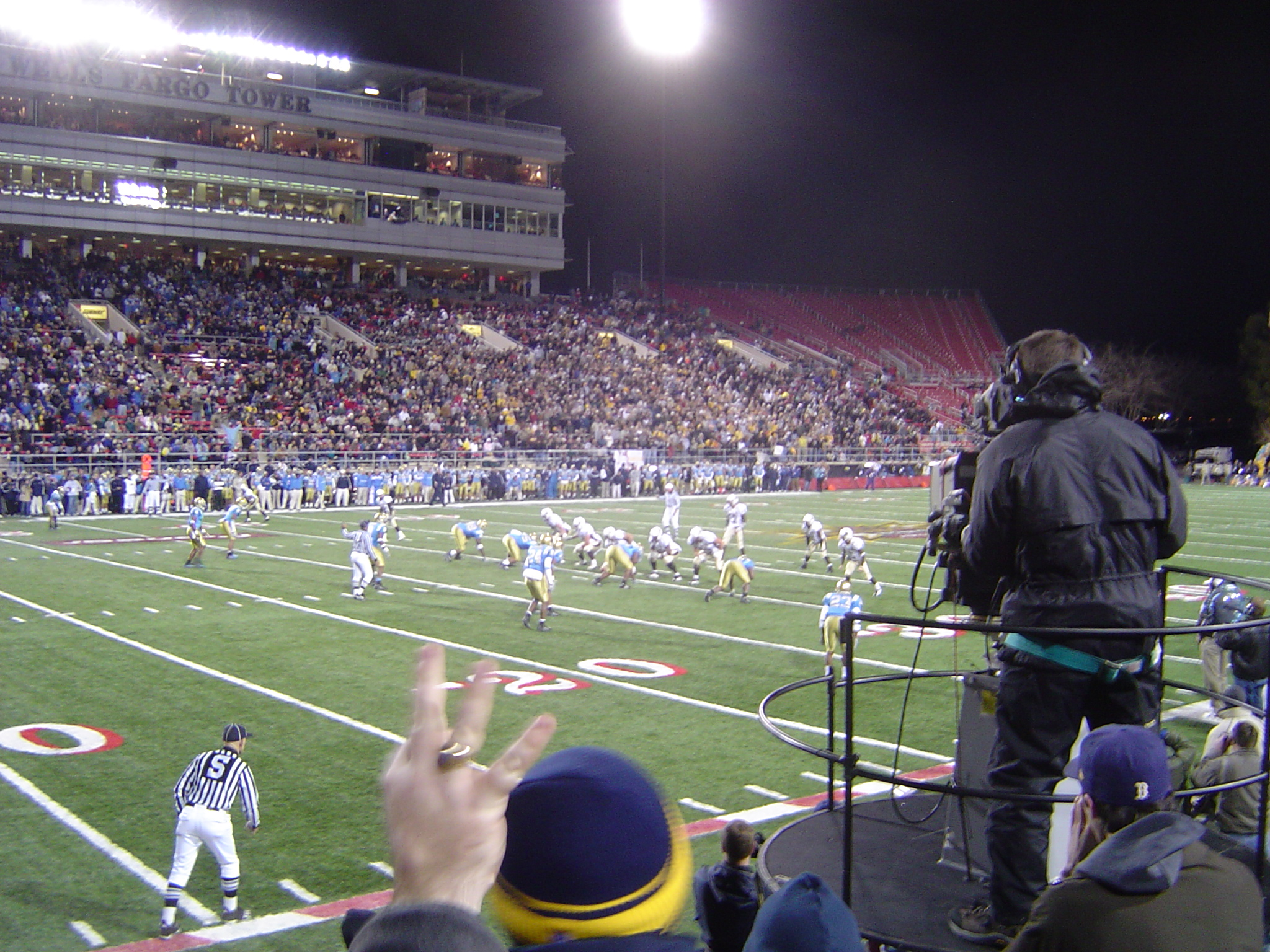
Wyoming defeated UCLA in the 2004 Las Vegas Bowl to end their six bowl game losing streak.

The Wyoming Cowboys college football team competes as part of the NCAA Division I Football Bowl Subdivision (FBS), representing the University of Wyoming in the Mountain West Conference (MW). Since the establishment of the team in 1892, Wyoming has appeared in 19 bowl games. The latest bowl appearance was on December 30, 2023, when Wyoming won against to Toledo University in the Barstool Sports Arizona Bowl. Barstool's founder, Dave Portnoy, and Pardon My Take's Dan Katz were the announcers for the event. The win brought the Cowboys' overall bowl record to ten wins and nine losses (10–9).

== Key ==
General
†	Bowl game record attendance
‡	Former bowl game record attendance

Results
W	Win
L	Loss

== Bowl games ==
List of bowl games showing bowl played in, score, date, season, opponent, stadium, location, attendance and head coach (Note: Statistics correct as of 2022–23 NCAA football bowl games.)
#	Bowl	Score (Note: Results are sortable first by whether the result was a Wyoming win, loss or tie and then second by the margin of victory.)	Date	Season (Note: Links to the season article for the Wyoming team that competed in the bowl for that year.)	Opponent (Note: Links to the season article for the opponent that Wyoming competed against in the bowl for that year when available or to their general page when unavailable.)	Stadium	Location	Attendance	Head coach
1	Gator Bowl	W 20–7	January 1, 1951	1950	Washington & Lee	Gator Bowl	Jacksonville	19,834	Bowden Wyatt
2	Sun Bowl	W 21–14	January 2, 1956	1955	Texas Tech	Kidd Field	El Paso	14,500	Phil Dickens
3	Sun Bowl	W 14–6	December 31, 1958	1958	Hardin–Simmons	Kidd Field	El Paso	13,000	Bob Devaney
4	Sun Bowl	W 28–20	December 24, 1966	1966	Florida State	Sun Bowl	El Paso	24,381	Lloyd Eaton
5	Sugar Bowl	L 20–13	January 1, 1968	1967	LSU	Tulane Stadium	New Orleans	78,963	Lloyd Eaton
6	Fiesta Bowl	L 41–7	December 25, 1976	1976	Oklahoma	Sun Devil Stadium	Tempe	48,174	Fred Akers
7	Holiday Bowl	L 20–19	December 30, 1987	1987	Iowa	Jack Murphy Stadium	San Diego	61,892^{‡}	Paul Roach
8	Holiday Bowl	L 62–14	December 30, 1988	1988	Oklahoma State	Jack Murphy Stadium	San Diego	60,718	Paul Roach
9	Copper Bowl	L 17–15	December 31, 1990	1990	California	Arizona Stadium	Tucson	36,340	Paul Roach
10	Copper Bowl	L 52–17	December 29, 1993	1993	Kansas State	Arizona Stadium	Tucson	49,075^{‡}	Joe Tiller
11	Las Vegas Bowl	W 24–21	December 23, 2004	2004	UCLA	Sam Boyd Stadium	Whitney	29,062	Joe Glenn
12	New Mexico Bowl	W 35–28 ^{2OT}	December 19, 2009	2009	Fresno State	University Stadium	Albuquerque	24,898	Dave Christensen
13	New Mexico Bowl	L 37–15	December 17, 2011	2011	Temple	University Stadium	Albuquerque	25,762	Dave Christensen
14	Poinsettia Bowl	L 24–21	December 21, 2016	2016	BYU	Qualcomm Stadium	San Diego	28,114	Craig Bohl
15	Famous Idaho Potato Bowl	W 37–14	December 22, 2017	2017	Central Michigan	Albertsons Stadium	Boise	16,512	Craig Bohl
16	Arizona Bowl	W 38–17	December 31, 2019	2019	Georgia State	Arizona Stadium	Tucson	36,892	Craig Bohl
17	Famous Idaho Potato Bowl	W 52–38	December 21, 2021	2021	Kent State	Albertsons Stadium	Boise	10,217	Craig Bohl
18	Arizona Bowl	L 27–30^{OT}	December 30, 2022	2022	Ohio	Arizona Stadium	Tucson	27,691	Craig Bohl
19	Arizona Bowl	W 16–15	December 30, 2023	2023	Toledo	Arizona Stadium	Tucson	30,428	Craig Bohl
