= List of Arizona State Sun Devils bowl games =

The Arizona State Sun Devils college football team competes as part of the National Collegiate Athletic Association (NCAA) Division I Football Bowl Subdivision (FBS), representing the Arizona State University in the Big 12 Conference (Big 12). Since the establishment of the team in 1897, Arizona State has appeared in 33 bowl games.

== Bowl games ==
Date	Season	Bowl	W/L	Opponent	PF	PA	Head Coach
January 1, 1940	1939	Sun Bowl	T	Catholic	0	0	Dixie Howell
January 2, 1941	1940	Sun Bowl	L	Western Reserve	13	26	Dixie Howell
January 2, 1950	1949	Salad Bowl	L	Xavier	21	33	Ed Doherty
January 1, 1951	1950	Salad Bowl	L	Miami (OH)	21	34	Ed Doherty
December 30, 1970	1970	Peach Bowl	W	North Carolina	48	26	Frank Kush
December 27, 1971	1971	Fiesta Bowl	W	Florida State	45	38	Frank Kush
December 23, 1972	1972	Fiesta Bowl	W	Missouri	49	35	Frank Kush
December 21, 1973	1973	Fiesta Bowl	W	Pittsburgh	28	7	Frank Kush
December 26, 1975	1975	Fiesta Bowl	W	Nebraska	17	14	Frank Kush
December 25, 1977	1977	Fiesta Bowl	L	Penn State	30	42	Frank Kush
December 16, 1978	1978	Garden State Bowl	W	Rutgers	34	18	Frank Kush
January 1, 1983	1982	Fiesta Bowl	W	Oklahoma	32	21	Darryl Rogers
December 22, 1985	1985	Holiday Bowl	L	Arkansas	17	18	John Cooper
January 1, 1987	1986	Rose Bowl	W	Michigan	22	15	John Cooper
December 30, 1987	1987	Freedom Bowl	W	Air Force	33	28	John Cooper
January 1, 1997	1996	Rose Bowl	L	Ohio State	17	20	Bruce Snyder
December 31, 1997	1997	Sun Bowl	W	Iowa	17	7	Bruce Snyder
December 25, 1999	1999	Aloha Bowl	L	Wake Forest	3	23	Bruce Snyder
December 25, 2000	2000	Aloha Bowl	L	Boston College	17	31	Bruce Snyder
December 27, 2002	2002	Holiday Bowl	L	Kansas State	27	34	Dirk Koetter
December 31, 2004	2004	Sun Bowl	W	Purdue	27	23	Dirk Koetter
December 27, 2005	2005	Insight Bowl	W	Rutgers	45	40	Dirk Koetter
December 24, 2006	2006	Hawaiʻi Bowl	L	Hawaiʻi	24	41	Dirk Koetter
December 27, 2007	2007	Holiday Bowl	L	Texas	34	52	Dennis Erickson
December 22, 2011	2011	Maaco Bowl Las Vegas	L	Boise State	24	56	Dennis Erickson
December 29, 2012	2012	Kraft Fight Hunger Bowl	W	Navy	62	28	Todd Graham
December 30, 2013	2013	Holiday Bowl	L	Texas Tech	23	37	Todd Graham
December 27, 2014	2014	Sun Bowl	W	Duke	36	31	Todd Graham
January 2, 2016	2015	Cactus Bowl	L	West Virginia	42	43	Todd Graham
December 29, 2017	2017	Sun Bowl	L	NC State	31	52	Todd Graham
December 15, 2018	2018	Las Vegas Bowl	L	Fresno State	20	31	Herm Edwards
December 31, 2019	2019	Sun Bowl	W	Florida State	20	14	Herm Edwards
December 30, 2021	2021	Las Vegas Bowl	L	Wisconsin	13	20	Herm Edwards
January 1, 2025	2024	Peach Bowl	L	Texas	31	39-2OT	Kenny Dillingham
December 31, 2025	2025	Sun Bowl	L	Duke	39	42	Kenny Dillingham
		Total	15–19–1	Opponent	962	1019	

=== Bowl Appearances ===
Bowl Appearances
Bowl Game	Appearances	Record
Sun Bowl	8	4-3-1
Fiesta Bowl	6	5-1
Holiday Bowl	4	0-4
Las Vegas Bowl	3	0-3
Salad Bowl	2	0-2
Rose Bowl	2	1-1
Aloha Bowl	2	0-2
Cactus Bowl	2	1-1
Peach Bowl	2	1-1
Garden State Bowl	1	1-0
Freedom Bowl	1	1-0
Hawaii Bowl	1	0-1
Kraft Fight Hunger Bowl	1	1-0

=== Bowl Opponent Frequency ===
Team	Times played	Record
Florida State	2	2-0
Rutgers	2	2-0
Duke	2	1-1
Texas	2	0-2
Catholic	1	0-0-1
Western Reserve	1	0-1
Xavier	1	0-1
Miami (OH)	1	0-1
North Carolina	1	1-0
Missouri	1	1-0
Pittsburgh	1	1-0
Nebraska	1	1-0
Penn State	1	0-1
Oklahoma	1	1-0
Arkansas	1	0-1
Michigan	1	1-0
Air Force	1	1-0
Ohio State	1	0-1
Iowa	1	1-0
Wake Forest	1	0-1
Boston College	1	0-1
Kansas State	1	0-1
Purdue	1	1-0
Hawaii	1	0-1
Boise State	1	0-1
Navy	1	1-0
Texas Tech	1	0-1
West Virginia	1	0-1
NC State	1	0-1
Fresno State	1	0-1
Wisconsin	1	0-1
