= List of Boise State Broncos bowl games =

The Boise State Broncos college football team competes as part of the National Collegiate Athletic Association (NCAA) Division I Football Bowl Subdivision (FBS), representing Boise State University as members of the Mountain West Conference. Since the establishment of the team in 1932 (although joined Division I in 1971 and FBS in 1996), Boise State has appeared in 23 bowl games. The Broncos have appeared in nine different bowl games, with multiple appearances in the Maaco Bowl Las Vegas/Las Vegas Bowl (5), the Humanitarian/MPC Computers Bowl (4), the Fiesta Bowl (4) (which was part of the Bowl Championship Series (BCS) and now part of the New Year's Six), the Hawaii Bowl (2), and the Poinsettia Bowl (2). Boise State was the only school from a non automatic qualifying conference to receive an at-large bid into a BCS game during the 2009 NCAA Division I FBS football season. They went to the 2010 Fiesta Bowl that season (all other appearances by non-AQ schools were actually automatic bids under BCS rules). Their 2018 bowl appearance, the 2018 First Responder Bowl, was canceled due to inclement weather with 5:08 left in the first quarter and ruled a no contest. Boise State's record is 13–9 in 23 bowl games.

== Key ==
Results
W	Win
L	Loss

== Bowl games ==
#	Bowl	Score	Date	Season	Opponent	Stadium	Location	Attendance	Head coach
1	Humanitarian Bowl	W 34–31	December 30, 1999	1999	Louisville	Bronco Stadium	Boise	29,283	Dirk Koetter
2	Humanitarian Bowl	W 38–23	December 28, 2000	2000	UTEP	Bronco Stadium	Boise	26,203	Dirk Koetter
3	Humanitarian Bowl	W 34–16	December 31, 2002	2002	Iowa State	Bronco Stadium	Boise	30,446	Dan Hawkins
4	Fort Worth Bowl	W 34–31	December 23, 2003	2003	TCU	Amon G. Carter Stadium	Fort Worth	38,028	Dan Hawkins
5	Liberty Bowl	L 40–44	December 31, 2004	2004	Louisville	Liberty Bowl Memorial Stadium	Memphis	58,355	Dan Hawkins
6	MPC Computers Bowl	L 21–27	December 28, 2005	2005	Boston College	Bronco Stadium	Boise	30,493	Dan Hawkins
7	Fiesta Bowl	W 43–42 ^{OT}	January 1, 2007	2006	Oklahoma	University of Phoenix Stadium	Glendale	73,719	Chris Petersen
8	Hawaii Bowl	L 38–41	December 23, 2007	2007	East Carolina	Aloha Stadium	Honolulu	30,467	Chris Petersen
9	Poinsettia Bowl	L 16–17	December 23, 2008	2008	TCU	Qualcomm Stadium	San Diego	34,628	Chris Petersen
10	Fiesta Bowl	W 17–10	January 4, 2010	2009	TCU	University of Phoenix Stadium	Glendale	73,227	Chris Petersen
11	Maaco Bowl Las Vegas	W 26–3	December 22, 2010	2010	Utah	Sam Boyd Stadium	Whitney	41,923	Chris Petersen
12	Maaco Bowl Las Vegas	W 56–24	December 22, 2011	2011	Arizona State	Sam Boyd Stadium	Whitney	35,720	Chris Petersen
13	Maaco Bowl Las Vegas	W 28–26	December 22, 2012	2012	Washington	Sam Boyd Stadium	Whitney	33,217	Chris Petersen
14	Hawaii Bowl	L 23–38	December 24, 2013	2013	Oregon State	Aloha Stadium	Honolulu	29,106	Bob Gregory (interim)
15	Fiesta Bowl	W 38–30	December 31, 2014	2014	Arizona	University of Phoenix Stadium	Glendale	66,896	Bryan Harsin
16	Poinsettia Bowl	W 55–7	December 23, 2015	2015	Northern Illinois	Qualcomm Stadium	San Diego	21,501	Bryan Harsin
17	Cactus Bowl	L 12–31	December 27, 2016	2016	Baylor	Chase Field	Phoenix	33,328	Bryan Harsin
18	Las Vegas Bowl	W 38–28	December 16, 2017	2017	Oregon	Sam Boyd Stadium	Whitney	36,432	Bryan Harsin
19	First Responder Bowl	No contest	December 26, 2018	2018	Boston College	Cotton Bowl	Dallas		Bryan Harsin
20	Las Vegas Bowl	L 7–38	December 21, 2019	2019	Washington	Sam Boyd Stadium	Whitney	34,197	Bryan Harsin
21	Frisco Bowl	W 35–32	December 17, 2022	2022	North Texas	Toyota Stadium	Frisco	12,211	Andy Avalos
22	LA Bowl	L 22-35	December 16, 2023	2023	UCLA	SoFi Stadium	Inglewood	32,780	Spencer Danielson
23	Fiesta Bowl	L 14-31	December 31, 2024	2024	Penn State	State Farm Stadium	Glendale	63,854	Spencer Danielson
24	LA Bowl	L 10-38	December 13, 2025	2025	Washington	SoFi Stadium	Inglewood		Spencer Danielson
