= List of Syracuse Orange bowl games =

The Syracuse Orange football team competes as part of the NCAA Division I Football Bowl Subdivision (FBS), representing Syracuse University in the Atlantic Division of the Atlantic Coast Conference (ACC). Since the establishment of the team in 1890, Syracuse has appeared in 28 bowl games. Included in these games are 7 combined appearances in the traditional "big four" bowl games (the Rose, Sugar, Cotton, and Orange) and 1 Bowl Championship Series (BCS) game appearances. The latest bowl appearance for Syracuse was a win against Washington State in the 2024 Holiday Bowl. This took Syracuse's all-time bowl record to 17 wins, 11 losses and one tie (17–11–1).

In addition to the bowls listed below, Syracuse also declined an invitation to the 1915 Rose Bowl due to an earlier trip to the West Coast.

== Bowl games ==
List of bowl games showing bowl played in, score, date, season, opponent, stadium, location, attendance and head coach
#	Bowl	Score	Date	Season	Opponent	Stadium	Location	Attendance	Head coach
1	Orange Bowl	L 6–61	January 1, 1953	1952	Alabama	Orange Bowl	Miami, Florida	66,280	Ben Schwartzwalder
2	Cotton Bowl Classic	L 27–28	January 1, 1957	1956	TCU	Cotton Bowl	Dallas, Texas	61,500	Ben Schwartzwalder
3	Orange Bowl	L 6–21	January 1, 1959	1958	Oklahoma	Orange Bowl	Miami, Florida	75,281	Ben Schwartzwalder
4	Cotton Bowl Classic	W 23–14	January 1, 1960	1959	Texas	Cotton Bowl	Dallas, Texas	75,500	Ben Schwartzwalder
5	Liberty Bowl	W 15–14	December 16, 1961	1961	Miami	Philadelphia Municipal Stadium (Note: The stadium's name was changed to John F. Kennedy Stadium in 1964, shortly after the President's assassination. This name was retained until the stadium was demolished in 1992.)	Philadelphia, Pennsylvania	15,712	Ben Schwartzwalder
6	Sugar Bowl	L 10–13	January 1, 1965	1964	LSU	Tulane Stadium	New Orleans, Louisiana	65,000	Ben Schwartzwalder
7	Gator Bowl	L 12–18	December 31, 1966	1966	Tennessee	Gator Bowl Stadium	Jacksonville, Florida	60,312	Ben Schwartzwalder
8	Independence Bowl	W 31–7	December 15, 1979	1979	McNeese State	Independence Stadium	Shreveport, Louisiana	27,234	Frank Maloney
9	Cherry Bowl	L 18–35	December 21, 1985	1985	Maryland	Pontiac Silverdome	Pontiac, Michigan	51,858	Dick MacPherson
10	Sugar Bowl	T 16–16	January 1, 1988	1987	Auburn	Louisiana Superdome (Note: Now known as Mercedes-Benz Superdome.)	New Orleans, Louisiana	75,495	Dick MacPherson
11	Hall of Fame Bowl	W 23–10	January 1, 1989	1988	LSU	Tampa Stadium	Tampa, Florida	51,112	Dick MacPherson
12	Peach Bowl	W 19–18	December 30, 1989	1989	Georgia	Atlanta–Fulton County Stadium	Atlanta, Georgia	44,991	Dick MacPherson
13	Aloha Bowl	W 28–0	December 25, 1990	1990	Arizona	Aloha Stadium	Honolulu, Hawaii	14,185	Dick MacPherson
14	Hall of Fame Bowl	W 24–17	January 1, 1992	1991	Ohio State	Tampa Stadium	Tampa, Florida	57,789	Paul Pasqualoni
15	Fiesta Bowl	W 26–22	January 1, 1993	1992	Colorado	Sun Devil Stadium (Note: Now known as Mountain America Stadium.)	Tempe, Arizona	70,224	Paul Pasqualoni
16	Gator Bowl	W 41–0	January 1, 1996	1995	Clemson	Jacksonville Municipal Stadium (Note: Now known as TIAA Bank Field.)	Jacksonville, Florida	45,202	Paul Pasqualoni
17	Liberty Bowl	W 30–17	December 27, 1996	1996	Houston	Liberty Bowl Memorial Stadium (Note: Now known as Simmons Bank Liberty Stadium.)	Memphis, Tennessee	49,163	Paul Pasqualoni
18	Fiesta Bowl	L 18–35	December 31, 1997	1997	Kansas State	Sun Devil Stadium (Note: Now known as Mountain America Stadium.)	Tempe, Arizona	69,367	Paul Pasqualoni
19	Orange Bowl	L 10–31	January 2, 1999	1998	Florida	Orange Bowl	Miami, Florida	67,919	Paul Pasqualoni
20	Music City Bowl	W 20–13	December 29, 1999	1999	Kentucky	Adelphia Coliseum (Note: Now known as Nissan Stadium.)	Nashville, Tennessee	59,221	Paul Pasqualoni
21	Insight.com Bowl	W 26–3	December 29, 2001	2001	Kansas State	Bank One Ballpark (Note: Now known as Chase Field.)	Phoenix, Arizona	40,028	Paul Pasqualoni
22	Champs Sports Bowl	L 14–51	December 21, 2004	2004	Georgia Tech	Citrus Bowl (Note: Now known as Camping World Stadium.)	Orlando, Florida	28,237	Paul Pasqualoni
23	Pinstripe Bowl	W 36–34	December 30, 2010	2010	Kansas State	Yankee Stadium	New York City, New York	38,274	Doug Marrone
24	Pinstripe Bowl	W 38–14	December 29, 2012	2012	West Virginia	Yankee Stadium	New York City, New York	39,098	Doug Marrone
25	Texas Bowl	W 21–17	December 27, 2013	2013	Minnesota	Reliant Stadium (Note: Now known as NRG Stadium.)	Houston, Texas	32,327	Scott Shafer
26	Camping World Bowl	W 34–18	December 28, 2018	2018	West Virginia	Camping World Stadium	Orlando, Florida	41,125	Dino Babers
27	Pinstripe Bowl	L 20–28	December 29, 2022	2022	Minnesota	Yankee Stadium	New York City, New York	31,131	Dino Babers
28	Boca Raton Bowl	L 0–45	December 21, 2023	2023	South Florida	FAU Stadium	Boca Raton, Florida	20,711	Nunzio Campanile (interim)
29	Holiday Bowl	W 52–35	December 27, 2024	2024	Washington State	Snapdragon Stadium	San Diego, California	23,920	Fran Brown
