= List of Houston Cougars bowl games =

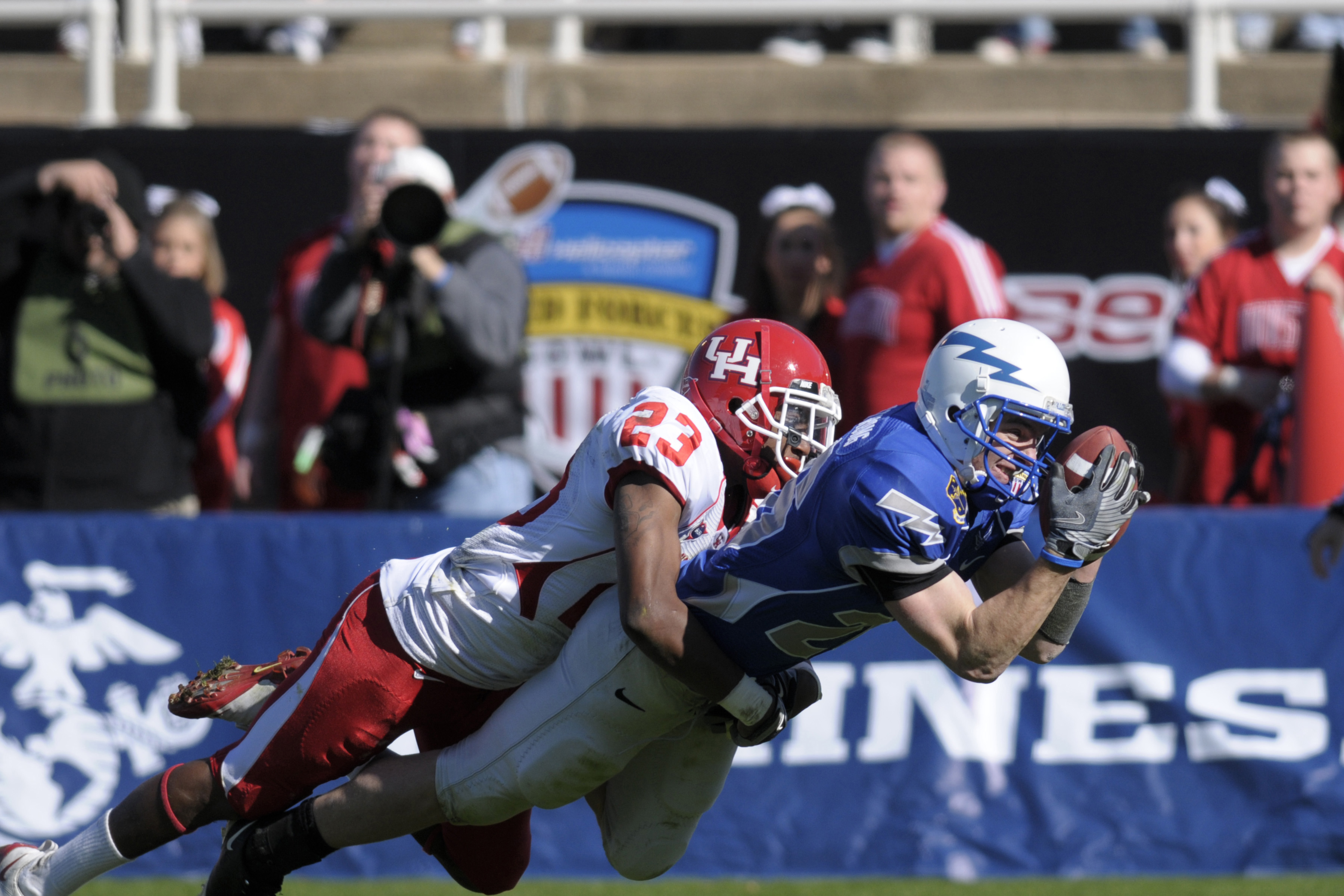
Houston defeated Air Force in the 2008 Armed Forces Bowl, to end their eight bowl game losing streak.

The Houston Cougars college football team competes as part of the NCAA Division I Football Bowl Subdivision (FBS), representing the University of Houston in the Big 12 Conference. Since the establishment of the team in 1946, Houston has appeared in 31 bowl games. The latest bowl occurred on December 27, 2025, when Houston defeated LSU in the 2025 Texas Bowl, which brought the Cougars' overall bowl record to fourteen wins, sixteen losses, and one tie (14–16–1).

== Key ==
General
†	Bowl game record attendance
‡	Former bowl game record attendance

Results
W	Win
L	Loss
T	Tie

== Bowl games ==
List of bowl games showing bowl played in, score, date, season, opponent, stadium, location, attendance and head coach (Note: Statistics correct as of 2025–26 NCAA football bowl games.)
#	Bowl	Score (Note: Results are sortable first by whether the result was a Houston win, loss or tie and then second by the margin of victory.)	Date	Season (Note: Links to the season article for the Houston team that competed in the bowl for that year.)	Opponent (Note: Links to the season article for the opponent that Houston competed against in the bowl for that year when available or to their general page when unavailable.)	Stadium	Location	Attendance	Head coach
1	Salad Bowl	W 26–21	January 1, 1952	1951	Dayton Flyers	Montgomery Stadium	Phoenix	17,000	Clyde Lee
2	Tangerine Bowl	W 49–21	December 22, 1962	1962	Miami Redskins	Tangerine Bowl	Orlando	7,500	Bill Yeoman
3	Astro-Bluebonnet Bowl	W 37–7	December 31, 1969	1969	Auburn Tigers	Astrodome	Houston	55,203	Bill Yeoman
4	Astro-Bluebonnet Bowl	L 17–29	December 31, 1971	1971	Colorado Buffaloes	Astrodome	Houston	54,720	Bill Yeoman
5	Astro-Bluebonnet Bowl	W 47–7	December 29, 1973	1973	Tulane Green Wave	Astrodome	Houston	44,358	Bill Yeoman
6	Astro-Bluebonnet Bowl	T 31–31	December 23, 1974	1974	NC State Wolfpack	Astrodome	Houston	35,122	Bill Yeoman
7	Cotton Bowl Classic	W 30–21	January 1, 1977	1976	Maryland Terrapins	Cotton Bowl	Dallas	54,500	Bill Yeoman
8	Cotton Bowl Classic	L 34–35	January 1, 1979	1978	Notre Dame Fighting Irish	Cotton Bowl	Dallas	76,601^{‡}	Bill Yeoman
9	Cotton Bowl Classic	W 17–14	January 1, 1980	1979	Nebraska Cornhuskers	Cotton Bowl	Dallas	72,032	Bill Yeoman
10	Garden State Bowl	W 35–0	December 14, 1980	1980	Navy Midshipmen	Giants Stadium	East Rutherford	41,417	Bill Yeoman
11	Sun Bowl	L 14–40	December 26, 1981	1981	Oklahoma Sooners	Sun Bowl Stadium	El Paso	33,816	Bill Yeoman
12	Cotton Bowl Classic	L 28–45	January 1, 1985	1984	Boston College Eagles	Cotton Bowl	Dallas	56,522	Bill Yeoman
13	Aloha Bowl	L 22–24	December 25, 1988	1988	Washington State Cougars	Aloha Stadium	Honolulu	35,132	Jack Pardee
14	Liberty Bowl	L 17–30	December 27, 1996	1996	Syracuse Orangemen	Liberty Bowl Memorial Stadium	Memphis	49,163	Kim Helton
15	Hawaiʻi Bowl	L 48–54	December 25, 2003	2003	Hawaii Warriors	Aloha Stadium	Honolulu	29,005	Art Briles
16	Fort Worth Bowl	L 13–42	December 23, 2005	2005	Kansas Jayhawks	Amon G. Carter Stadium	Fort Worth	33,505	Art Briles
17	Liberty Bowl	L 36–44	December 29, 2006	2006	South Carolina Gamecocks	Liberty Bowl Memorial Stadium	Memphis	56,103	Art Briles
18	Texas Bowl	L 13–20	December 28, 2007	2007	TCU Horned Frogs	Reliant Stadium	Houston	62,097^{‡}	Chris Thurmond (Note: Chris Thurmond served as interim head coach for the 2007 Texas Bowl after Art Briles resigned his position to take the head coach position with the Baylor Bears.)
19	Armed Forces Bowl	W 34–28	December 31, 2008	2008	Air Force Falcons	Amon G. Carter Stadium	Fort Worth	41,127	Kevin Sumlin
20	Armed Forces Bowl	L 20–47	December 31, 2009	2009	Air Force Falcons	Amon G. Carter Stadium	Fort Worth	41,414	Kevin Sumlin
21	TicketCity Bowl	W 30–14	January 2, 2012	2011	Penn State Nittany Lions	Cotton Bowl	Dallas	46,817	Tony Levine
22	BBVA Compass Bowl	L 24–41	January 4, 2014	2013	Vanderbilt Commodores	Legion Field	Birmingham	42,717	Tony Levine
23	Armed Forces Bowl	W 35–34	January 2, 2015	2014	Pittsburgh Panthers	Amon G. Carter Stadium	Fort Worth	37,888	David Gibbs (Note: David Gibbs served as interim head coach for the 2015 Armed Forces Bowl after Tony Levine was fired from his position as head coach.)
24	Peach Bowl	W 38–24	December 31, 2015	2015	Florida State Seminoles	Georgia Dome	Atlanta	71,007	Tom Herman
25	Las Vegas Bowl	L 10–34	December 17, 2016	2016	San Diego State Aztecs	Sam Boyd Stadium	Las Vegas	29,286	Major Applewhite
26	Hawaiʻi Bowl	L 27–33	December 24, 2017	2017	Fresno State Bulldogs	Aloha Stadium	Honolulu	20,546	Major Applewhite
27	Armed Forces Bowl	L 14–70	December 22, 2018	2018	Army Black Knights	Amon G. Carter Stadium	Fort Worth	44,738	Major Applewhite
28	New Mexico Bowl	L 14–28	December 24, 2020	2020	Hawaii Rainbow Warriors	Toyota Stadium	Frisco	2,060	Dana Holgorsen
29	Birmingham Bowl	W 17–13	December 28, 2021	2021	Auburn Tigers	Protective Stadium	Birmingham	47,100	Dana Holgorsen
30	Independence Bowl	W 23–16	December 23, 2022	2022	Louisiana Ragin' Cajuns	Independence Stadium	Shreveport	23,410	Dana Holgorsen
31	Texas Bowl	W 38–35	December 27, 2025	2025	LSU Tigers	NRG Stadium	Houston	63,867	Willie Fritz
