= List of Wake Forest Demon Deacons bowl games =

The Wake Forest Demon Deacons college football team competes as part of the NCAA Division I Football Bowl Subdivision (FBS), representing the Wake Forest University in the Atlantic Division of the Atlantic Coast Conference (ACC). Since the establishment of the team in 1888, Wake Forest has appeared in 17 bowl games. The latest bowl occurred on December 23, 2022, with Wake Forest defeating Missouri in the 2022 Gasparilla Bowl. The Demon Deacons' overall bowl record is eleven wins and six losses.

== Key ==
General
†	Bowl game record attendance
‡	Former bowl game record attendance

Results
W	Win
L	Loss

== Bowl games ==
List of bowl games showing bowl played in, score, date, season, opponent, stadium, location, attendance and head coach (Note: Statistics correct as of 2011–12 NCAA football bowl games.)
#	Bowl	Score (Note: Results are sortable first by whether the result was a Wake Forest win, loss or tie and then second by the margin of victory.)	Date	Season (Note: Links to the season article for the Wake Forest team that competed in the bowl for that year.)	Opponent (Note: Links to the season article for the opponent that Wake Forest competed against in the bowl for that year when available or to their general page when unavailable.)	Stadium	Location	Attendance	Head coach
1	Gator Bowl	W 26–14	January 2, 1946	1945	South Carolina Gamecocks	Gator Bowl	Jacksonville	7,362^{‡}	Peahead Walker
2	Dixie Bowl	L 7–20	January 1, 1949	1948	Baylor Bears	Legion Field	Birmingham	20,000	Peahead Walker
3	Tangerine Bowl	L 10–34	December 22, 1979	1979	LSU Tigers	Orlando Stadium	Orlando	38,666	John Mackovic
4	Independence Bowl	W 39–35	December 31, 1992	1992	Oregon Ducks	Independence Stadium	Shreveport	31,337	Bill Dooley
5	Aloha Bowl	W 23–3	December 25, 1999	1999	Arizona State Sun Devils	Aloha Stadium	Honolulu	40,974	Jim Caldwell
6	Seattle Bowl	W 38–17	December 30, 2002	2002	Oregon Ducks	Seahawks Stadium	Seattle	38,241	Jim Grobe
7	Orange Bowl	L 13–24	January 2, 2007	2006	Louisville Cardinals	Dolphin Stadium	Miami Gardens	74,470	Jim Grobe
8	Meineke Car Care Bowl	W 24–10	December 29, 2007	2007	Connecticut Huskies	Bank of America Stadium	Charlotte	53,126	Jim Grobe
9	EagleBank Bowl	W 29–19	December 20, 2008	2008	Navy Midshipmen	RFK Stadium	Washington	28,777^{‡}	Jim Grobe
10	Music City Bowl	L 17–23	December 30, 2011	2011	Mississippi State Bulldogs	LP Field	Nashville	55,208	Jim Grobe
11	Military Bowl	W 34–26	December 27, 2016	2016	Temple Owls	Navy–Marine Corps Memorial Stadium	Annapolis	26,656	Dave Clawson
12	Belk Bowl	W 55–52	December 29, 2017	2017	Texas A&M Aggies	Bank of America Stadium	Charlotte	32,784	Dave Clawson
13	Birmingham Bowl	W 37–34	December 22, 2018	2018	Memphis Tigers	Legion Field	Birmingham	25,717	Dave Clawson
14	Pinstripe Bowl	L 21–27	December 27, 2019	2019	Michigan State Spartans	Yankee Stadium	The Bronx	36,895	Dave Clawson
15	Duke's Mayo Bowl	L 28–42	December 30, 2020	2020	Wisconsin Badgers	Bank of America Stadium	Charlotte	1,500	Dave Clawson
16	Gator Bowl	W 38–10	December 31, 2021	2021	Rutgers Scarlet Knights	TIAA Bank Stadium	Jacksonville	28,508	Dave Clawson
17	Gasparilla Bowl	W 27–17	December 23, 2022	2022	Missouri Tigers	Raymond James Stadium	Tampa	34,370	Dave Clawson
18	Duke's Mayo Bowl	W 43–29	January 2, 2026	2025	Mississippi State Bulldogs	Bank of America Stadium	Charlotte	29,328	Jake Dickert
