= List of Kentucky Wildcats bowl games =

This is a list of Kentucky Wildcats football bowl games. The Kentucky Wildcats are the men's and women's intercollegiate athletic squads of the University of Kentucky (UK), a founding member of the Southeastern Conference. Kentucky has been to 23 bowl games, 13 of which occurred in the five consecutive seasons from 2006 to 2010 and the eight consecutive seasons from 2016 to 2023. Their record in bowl games is 11–12.The list shows the bowl played in, score, date, season, opponent, stadium, location, attendance and head coach.

== Key ==
General
†	Bowl game record attendance
‡	Former bowl game record attendance

Results
W	Win
L	Loss
T	Tie

== Bowl games ==
List of bowl games showing bowl played in, score, date, season, opponent, stadium, location, attendance and head coach
#	Bowl	Score	Date	Season	Opponent	Stadium	Location	Attendance	Head coach
1	Great Lakes Bowl	W 20–19	December 6, 1947	1947	Villanova	Cleveland Stadium	Cleveland	14,908	Bear Bryant
2	Orange Bowl	L 13–21	January 2, 1950	1949	Santa Clara	Miami Orange Bowl	Miami	64,816	Bear Bryant
3	Sugar Bowl	W 13–7	January 1, 1951	1950	Oklahoma	Tulane Stadium	New Orleans	82,000	Bear Bryant
4	Cotton Bowl	W 20–7	January 1, 1952	1951	Texas Christian	Cotton Bowl	Dallas	75,349	Bear Bryant
5	Peach Bowl	W 21–0	December 31, 1976	1976	North Carolina	Atlanta–Fulton County Stadium	Atlanta	54,132	Fran Curci
6	Hall of Fame Classic	L 16–20	December 22, 1983	1983	West Virginia	Legion Field	Birmingham	42,000	Jerry Claiborne
7	Hall of Fame Classic	W 20–19	December 29, 1984	1984	Wisconsin	Legion Field	Birmingham	47,300	Jerry Claiborne
8	Peach Bowl	L 13–14	December 31, 1993	1993	Clemson	Georgia Dome	Atlanta	64,416	Bill Curry
9	Outback Bowl	L 14–26	January 1, 1999	1998	Penn State	Raymond James Stadium	Tampa	66,005	Hal Mumme
10	Music City Bowl	L 13–20	December 29, 1999	1999	Syracuse	Adelphia Coliseum (Note: Now known as Nissan Stadium.)	Nashville	59,221	Hal Mumme
11	Music City Bowl	W 28–20	December 29, 2006	2006	Clemson	LP Field	Nashville	68,024	Rich Brooks
12	Music City Bowl	W 35–28	December 31, 2007	2007	Florida State	LP Field	Nashville	68,661	Rich Brooks
13	Liberty Bowl	W 25–19	January 2, 2009	2008	East Carolina	Liberty Bowl Memorial Stadium	Memphis	56,125	Rich Brooks
14	Music City Bowl	L 13–21	December 27, 2009	2009	Clemson	LP Field	Nashville	57,280	Rich Brooks
15	BBVA Compass Bowl	L 10–27	January 8, 2011	2010	Pittsburgh	Legion Field	Birmingham	41,207	Joker Phillips
16	TaxSlayer Bowl	L 18–33	December 31, 2016	2016	Georgia Tech	EverBank Field (Note: Now known as TIAA Bank Field.)	Jacksonville	43,102	Mark Stoops
17	Music City Bowl	L 23–24	December 29, 2017	2017	Northwestern	Nissan Stadium	Nashville	48,675	Mark Stoops
18	Citrus Bowl	W 27–24	January 1, 2019	2018	Penn State	Camping World Stadium	Orlando	59,167	Mark Stoops
19	Belk Bowl	W 37–30	December 31, 2019	2019	Virginia Tech	Bank of America Stadium	Charlotte	44,138	Mark Stoops
20	Gator Bowl	W 23–21	January 2, 2021	2020	NC State	TIAA Bank Field	Jacksonville	10,442	Mark Stoops
21	Citrus Bowl	W* 20–17	January 1, 2022	2021	Iowa	Camping World Stadium	Orlando	50,769	Mark Stoops
22	Music City Bowl	L 0–21	December 31, 2022	2022	Iowa	Nissan Stadium	Nashville	42,312	Mark Stoops
23	Gator Bowl	L 35–38	December 29, 2023	2023	Clemson	EverBank Stadium	Jacksonville	40,132	Mark Stoops

- Kentucky vacated all 2021 wins in August 2024.
