= 2004 Gator Bowl =

2004 Toyota Gator Bowl
- 59th Gator Bowl
Maryland Terrapins	West Virginia Mountaineers
(9–3)	(8–4)
ACC	Big East
41	7
Head coach: Ralph Friedgen	Head coach: Rich Rodriguez
AP / Coaches / BCS; 23 / 24 / 23	AP / Coaches / BCS; 20 / 23 / NR
	1	2	3	4	Total
Maryland	10	14	10	7	41
West Virginia	0	0	7	0	7
- Date: January 1, 2004
- Season: 2003
- Stadium: Alltel Stadium
- Location: Jacksonville, Florida
- MVP: Scott McBrien (UMD), Brian King (WVU)
- Favorite: Maryland -4.5
- Referee: Rogers Redding (SEC)
- Attendance: 78,892

United States TV coverage
- Network: NBC
- Announcers: Tom Hammond, Pat Haden, Lewis Johnson

The 2004 Gator Bowl was a post-season American college football bowl game between the Maryland Terrapins and the West Virginia Mountaineers. The 59th edition of the Gator Bowl, it was played at Alltel Stadium in Jacksonville, Florida, on January 1, 2004. The game was the final contest of the 2003 NCAA Division I-A football season for both teams, and ended in a 41–7 victory for Maryland.

The Maryland Terrapins (more often, simply 'Terps') earned a bid to the Gator Bowl following a 9–3 record during the 2003 regular season. It was Ralph Friedgen's third season as Maryland head coach and third consecutive bowl game, making him just the second Maryland head coach to do so in his first three seasons—the other being Bobby Ross. At the conclusion of this game, Friedgen also became the first Atlantic Coast Conference coach to ever win at least ten games in his first three seasons. Going into the game, Maryland's 30-win three seasons was the best three-year total in school history.

The West Virginia Mountaineers had finished the regular season with a record of 8–4, which already included a defeat at the hands of Maryland. Like Friedgen, it was Rich Rodriguez's third year as head coach of his program. West Virginia entered the game on a seven-game winning streak, as co-champions of the Big East conference.

The game took place in front of a crowd of 78,892 fans. The Terps got off to a quick lead, and never relented. Early in the third quarter, Maryland led 31-0 before West Virginia scored its only points. Oddly enough, the game was a bowl rematch of a regular season game which had similarly lop-sided results: Maryland had won that contest too, 34-7. It marked the fourth Terps' win over the Mountaineers in three years, by an average score of 35-13.

== Team selection ==
=== Maryland ===
The 2003 season was Ralph Friedgen's third as head coach at Maryland. He had already compiled an impressive record in his first two years, elevating Terrapins football back to the national stage for the first time since Bobby Ross left the program in the wake of the Len Bias tragedy. His first year as head coach in 2001, Friedgen had led the Terrapins to a 10-2 record and the BCS Orange Bowl, for the team's first winning season in five years and the first bowl game in eleven years.

=== West Virginia ===
West Virginia's 2003 season started off badly, with a 1-4 record including losses to Wisconsin, Cincinnati, Maryland, and fellow Big East foe Miami. However, the Mountaineers recovered to win their next seven games and secure a conference co-championship with Miami. With it they also received a bowl bid to travel to Jacksonville to face the Terps in a post-season rematch.

== Game summary ==
=== First quarter ===
The game started with a West Virginia kick off into the Maryland endzone where Steve Suter returned it for 23 yards. Quarterback Scott McBrien led the Terps on a drive with Bruce Perry carrying 22 yards and a pass to Steve Suter for 16 and Jo Jo Walker for 29 yards. The Mountaineers held fast at their own 10-yard line and forced a field goal attempt. Nick Novak made good a 27-yard kick for the first points in the game.

In the next two series, West Virginia and Maryland exchanged punts. Mountaineer running back Kay-Jay Harris then fumbled the ball which was recovered by Shawne Merriman for the Terps. Maryland suffered two fumbles, by running back Bruce Perry and Scott McBrien, but recovered both. They again tried for a field goal, but Nick Novak missed the 51-yard attempt.

West Virginia took over on downs on their 34-yard line and rushed three times for 16 yards before quarterback Rasheed Marshall fumbled and Maryland linebacker Andrew Henley recovered it at midfield.

On their next possession, the Terps pushed to the Mountaineer 31-yard line before Scott McBrien completed a pass to Jafar Williams for a 31-yard touchdown.

=== Second quarter ===
The Terps kicked off to start to 2nd quarter, and with a touchback, West Virginia took over on their 20-yard line. After a three-and-out series, they brought on their special teams unit. Steve Suter received the punt on the Maryland 24 and ran it 76 yards for a touchdown.

West Virginia took over and made a first-down, but was forced to punt again. Scott McBrien then led the Terps on an 81-yard drive capped by a 22-yard touchdown pass again to Jafar Williams.

The Mountaineers were forced three-and-out and punted once more. Maryland drove down to the West Virginia 18, but a 35-yard field goal attempt by Nick Novak was again missed. Likewise, West Virginia pushed to the Maryland 24, before missing a 41-yard field goal of their own to end the half.

=== Third quarter ===
After Grant Wiley returned the kick 28 yards for the Mountaineers, they were once again held three-and-out and forced to punt. After driving to mid-field, Scott McBrien launched a 43-yard pass to Steve Suter. Despite good coverage from cornerback Lance Frazier, Suter was able to tip the ball with one hand and catch it in mid-air as he was diving to the ground in a tangle with Frazier. This set up a two-yard rush by McBrien for a touchdown, and Maryland expanded its lead to 31-0.

West Virginia received the kick and Adam Jones made a short return for six yards. Rasheed Marshall held onto the ball and rushed for another six yards. Kay-Jay Harris then broke free for a 29-yard run. The Mountaineers picked up another eight yards with a pass to Chris Henry. This set up a 15-yard run up the middle by quarterback Marshall for what would be West Virginia's only points of the game.

Maryland responded with another drive, including a 28-yard pass to the right to Josh Allen and a 43-yard pass up the middle to Dan Melendez. After another short run and short pass, Maryland settle for a 24-yard field goal by Novak.

=== Fourth quarter ===
The teams traded punts, and then the Mountaineers punted once more. A 73-yard drive was then capped with a 14-yard pass to Jo Jo Walker for another touchdown, and the final points of the game. The next Mountaineers' possession was ended with a sack of second-string quarterback Charles Hales and a turnover on downs. Maryland took over on the West Virginia 38, and pushed to the 6-yard line before the game ended on 4th and 1.

== Statistical summary ==
Statistical comparison
	MD	WV
1st downs	26	9
Total yards	522	241
Passing yards	381	86
Rushing yards	141	155
Penalties	6–45	6–40
Turnovers	0	2
Time of possession	38:59	21:01

== Postgame effects ==
The New York Times computer ranking system rated the Maryland Terrapins as the number-three team in the nation, after split-national champions USC and LSU. The rating put the Terps considerably ahead of number-four Ohio State, number-five Miami, and number-six Georgia.

The Associated Press poll placed Maryland as #17 and the ESPN/USA Today Coaches' poll ranked them as #20 in the nation.

Terps' head coach Ralph Friedgen was picked as a coach of the Kai team for the Hula Bowl opposite Ohio State head coach Jim Tressel. Maryland players Lamar Bryant (OG), Eric Dumas (OL), Dennard Wilson (S), and Jeff Dugan (TE) were selected to play for the Kai squad. Scott Smith (DE) was selected for the Las Vegas All-American Classic, while Madieu Williams (FS) played in the Senior Bowl. Bruce Perry (TB), Scott McBrien (QB), and Leon Joe (LB) played in the Gridiron Classic.

== See also ==
- List of college football post-season games that were rematches of regular season games
- Maryland–West Virginia football rivalry
