= 2024 Rate Bowl =

Postseason college football bowl game

- 35th Rate Bowl
Rutgers Scarlet Knights	Kansas State Wildcats
(7–5)	(8–4)
Big Ten	Big 12
41	44
Head coach: Greg Schiano	Head coach: Chris Klieman
	1	2	3	4	Total
Rutgers	7	20	7	7	41
Kansas State	3	14	12	15	44
- Date: December 26, 2024
- Season: 2024
- Stadium: Chase Field
- Location: Phoenix, Arizona
- MVP: Offense: Dylan Edwards (RB, Kansas State); Defense: Austin Moore (LB, Kansas State)
- Referee: Nate Black (ACC)
- Attendance: 21,659

United States TV coverage
- Network: ESPN; ESPN Radio
- Announcers: Wes Durham (play-by-play), Tom Luginbill (analyst), and Dana Boyle (sideline) (ESPN); Jorge Sedano (play-by-play) and Taylor McHargue (analyst) (ESPN Radio)

The 2024 Rate Bowl was a college football bowl game played on December 26, 2024, at Chase Field in Phoenix, Arizona. The 35th annual Rate Bowl game featured Rutgers and Kansas State. The game began at approximately 3:30 p.m. MST and aired on ESPN. The game was one of the 2024–25 bowl games concluding the 2024 FBS football season. The game's title sponsor was residential mortgage company Rate, formerly known as Guaranteed Rate.

== Teams ==
Consistent with conference tie-ins, the game features teams from the Big 12 Conference and Big Ten Conference. This will be the second meeting between the Scarlet Knights and the Wildcats, with Rutgers winning their prior meeting in the 2006 Texas Bowl.

=== Rutgers Scarlet Knights ===
Rutgers compiled a regular-season record of 7–5 (4–5 in Big Ten play). The Scarlet Knights opened the season with four consecutive wins, lost their next four games, then finished with three wins in their final four games. Rutgers faced one ranked team during the season, losing to Illinois.

=== Kansas State Wildcats ===
Kansas State posted an 8–4 record (5–4 in Big 12 play) during the regular season. The Wildcats were ranked as high as 13th and had a 7–1 record after eight games, then lost three of their final four games to fall out of the rankings. Kansas State faced three ranked teams, defeating Arizona and Oklahoma State while losing to Iowa State.

== Game summary ==
2024 Rate Bowl

Quarter	1	2	3	4	Total
Rutgers	7	20	7	7	41
Kansas State	3	14	12	15	44

at Chase Field • Phoenix, Arizona

- Date: Thursday, December 26, 2024
- Game time: 3:40 p.m. MST
- Game weather: Indoor
- Game attendance: 21,659
- Referee: Nate Black
- TV announcers (ESPN): Wes Durham (play-by-play), Tom Luginbill (analyst), and Dana Boyle (sideline)
- Box score

Game information

First Quarter

- (11:21) KSU – Chris Tennant 29 yard field goal (Drive: 9 plays, 69 yards, 3:02; Kansas State 3–0)
- (4:15) RUTG – Antwan Raymond 2 yard rush, Jai Patel kick (Drive: 13 plays, 75 yards, 7:06; Rutgers 7–3)

Second Quarter

- (14:56) KSU – Avery Johnson 2 yard rush, Chris Tennant kick (Drive: 9 plays, 75 yards, 4:19; Kansas State 10–7)
- (12:55) RUTG – Jai Patel 31 yard field goal (Drive: 6 plays, 62 yards, 2:01; Tied 10–10)
- (9:31) RUTG – Ja'shon Benjamin 3 yard rush, Jai Patel kick (Drive: 4 plays, 75 yards, 1:58; Rutgers 17–10)
- (6:44) KSU – Dylan Edwards 26 yard pass from Avery Johnson, Chris Tennant kick (Drive: 6 plays, 75 yards, 2:47; Tied 17–17)
- (4:45) RUTG – Antwan Raymond 24 yard rush, Jai Patel kick (Drive: 6 plays, 75 yards, 1:59; Rutgers 24–17)
- (1:04) RUTG – Jai Patel 48 yard field goal (Drive: 7 plays, 28 yards, 1:36; Rutgers 27–17)

Third Quarter

- (8:57) RUTG – Ja'shon Benjamin 7 yard pass from Athan Kaliakmanis, Jai Patel kick (Drive: 10 plays, 64 yards, 4:22; Rutgers 34–17)
- (5:45) KSU – Dylan Edwards 65 yard rush, two-point pass conversion failed (Drive: 1 plays, 65 yards, 0:11; Rutgers 34–23)
- (3:39) KSU – Garrett Oakley 13 yard pass from Avery Johnson, two-point pass conversion failed (Drive: 4 plays, 42 yards, 1:16; Rutgers 34–29)

Fourth Quarter

- (14:02) RUTG – Antwan Raymond 1 yard rush, Jai Patel kick (Drive: 5 plays, 18 yards, 2:03; Rutgers 41–29)
- (7:03) KSU – Joe Jackson 9 yard pass from Avery Johnson, Chris Tennant kick (Drive: 14 plays, 85 yards, 6:53; Rutgers 41–36)
- (4:15) KSU – Dylan Edwards 36 yard rush, Garrett Oakley pass from Avery Johnson for two-point conversion (Drive: 3 plays, 60 yards, 1:13; Kansas State 44–41)

=== Statistics ===
Statistics	RUT	KSU
First downs	18	23
Plays–yards	68–401	70–546
Rushes–yards	36–164	40–351
Passing yards	237	195
Passing: comp–att–int	14–32–1	15–30–1
Time of possession	28:55	29:05

Team	Category	Player	Statistics
Rutgers	Passing	Athan Kaliakmanis	14/32, 237 yards, 1 TD, 1 INT
Rutgers	Rushing	Antwan Raymond	18 carries, 113 yards, 3 TD
Rutgers	Receiving	Ian Strong	5 receptions, 105 yards
Kansas State	Passing	Avery Johnson	15/30, 195 yards, 3 TD, 1 INT
Kansas State	Rushing	Dylan Edwards	18 carries, 196 yards, 2 TD
Kansas State	Receiving	Jayce Brown	5 receptions, 60 yards
