= Rose Bowl Game =

Annual American college gridiron football postseason game

Coordinates: 34.161°N 118.168°W

- Rose Bowl Game presented by Prudential
- The Granddaddy of Them All
- Stadium: Rose Bowl
- Location: Pasadena, California
- Previous stadiums: Tournament Park (1902, 1916–1922)
- Temporary venue: Duke Stadium, Durham, North Carolina (1942) (Note: The 1942 game was played in Duke Stadium in Durham, North Carolina, because of a restriction on crowds allowed on the West Coast after the attack on Pearl Harbor.); AT&T Stadium, Arlington, Texas (2021) (Note: The 2021 game was moved to Arlington, Texas, shortly after event organizers were unable to receive an exception from the state of California to allow fan attendance during the COVID-19 pandemic.)
- Operated: 1902, 1916–present
- Championship affiliation: CFP (2014–present); BCS (1998–2013)
- Previous conference tie-ins: Pac-12 (1917–2023); Big Ten (1947–2026)
- Payout: US$35 million/conference (As of 2016)
- Website: rosebowlgame.com

Sponsors
- Pasadena Tournament of Roses Association (1902, 1916–1998); AT&T (1999–2002); Sony/PlayStation 2 (2003); Citi (2004–2010); Vizio (2011–2014); Northwestern Mutual (2015–2020); Capital One (2021–2022); Prudential Financial (2023–present)

Former names
- Tournament East–West football game (1902, 1916–1922); Rose Bowl (1923–1998); Rose Bowl presented by AT&T (1999–2002); Rose Bowl presented by PlayStation 2 (2003); Rose Bowl presented by Citi (2004–2010); Rose Bowl presented by Vizio (2011–2014); Rose Bowl Game presented by Northwestern Mutual (2015–2020); Rose Bowl Game presented by Capital One (2021); Rose Bowl Game presented by Capital One Venture X (2022)

2026 matchup
- Alabama vs. Indiana (Indiana 38–3)

The Rose Bowl Game is an annual American college football bowl game, traditionally played on January 1 (New Year's Day) at the Rose Bowl in Pasadena, California. When New Year's Day falls on a Sunday, the game is played on Monday, January 2.

Nicknamed "The Granddaddy of Them All" by broadcaster Keith Jackson, it was the first postseason football game ever established. The Rose Bowl Game was first played in 1902 as the Tournament East–West football game, and has been played annually since 1916. Since 1945, it has been the highest attended college football bowl game. The game is a part of the Pasadena Tournament of Roses Association's "America's New Year Celebration", which also includes the historic Rose Parade. Winners of the game receive the Leishman Trophy, named for former Tournament of Roses presidents, William L. Leishman and Lathrop K. Leishman who played an important part in the history of this game.

Starting in 1917, the Rose Bowl Game selected a team from the predecessor of the Pac-12 Conference each year along with a team from the eastern half of the country. In 1947, the Rose Bowl Game began its traditional matchup of the conference champions from the Big Ten Conference and the predecessor of the Pac-12 Conference, which continued to 2023, with some exceptions.

In 1998, the Rose Bowl Game joined with several other bowls to create the Bowl Championship Series to produce an undisputed national champion in college football. This marked the first time the Rose Bowl agreed to release the Big Ten or Pac-12 champion to play in a national championship game if they were ranked #1 or #2. The Rose Bowl Game served as the national championship game in 2002 and 2006. The Rose Bowl stadium and the Pasadena Tournament of Roses Association hosted the BCS National Championship Game in 2010 and 2014, in addition to the regular Rose Bowl Game.

In 2014, the Rose Bowl, along with the other "New Year's Six" bowls, became a part of the College Football Playoff. As part of the four team playoff from 2014 to 2023, the Rose Bowl served as a semifinal game in 2015, 2018, and 2021. When not serving as a semifinal, the Rose Bowl featured the best available teams from the Big Ten and Pac-12 conferences.

With the expansion of the College Football Playoff to twelve teams in the 2024–25 season, the Rose Bowl will serve as a quarterfinal each year. The Rose Bowl is the only CFP bowl to not be in the rotation for hosting a semifinal, allowing it to maintain its traditional New Year's Day slot. Beginning with the 2027 edition, the Rose Bowl Game no longer has a conference tie-in.

== History ==
Originally titled the "Tournament East–West football game", the first Rose Bowl was played on January 1, 1902, starting the tradition of New Year's Day bowl games. The football game was added in 1902 to help fund the cost of the Rose Parade. The inaugural game featured Fielding H. Yost's dominating 1901 Michigan team, representing the East, which crushed a previously 3–1–2 team from Stanford University, representing the West, by a score of 49–0 after Stanford quit in the third quarter. Michigan finished the season 11–0 and was crowned the national champion. Yost had been Stanford's coach the previous year. The game was so lopsided that for the next thirteen years, the Tournament of Roses officials ran chariot races, ostrich races, and other various events instead of football. But, on New Year's Day 1916, football returned to stay as the State College of Washington (now Washington State University) defeated Brown University in the first of what was thereafter an annual tradition.

=== Tournament Park and Rose Bowl stadium ===
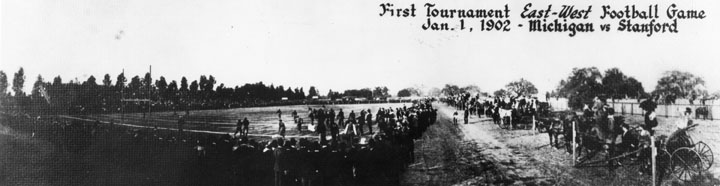
The very first Rose Bowl Game at Tournament park in 1902: Michigan v Stanford

Before the Rose Bowl was built, games were played in Pasadena's Tournament Park, approximately three miles (5 km) southeast of the current Rose Bowl stadium, near the campus of Caltech. Tournament Park was found to be unsuitable for the increasingly large crowds gathering to watch the game and a new, permanent home for the game was commissioned.

The Rose Bowl stadium, designed after the Yale Bowl in New Haven, hosted its first "Rose Bowl" game on January 1, 1923. The name of the stadium was alternatively "Tournament of Roses Stadium" or "Tournament of Roses Bowl", until the name "Rose Bowl" was settled on before the 1923 game.

The stadium seating has been reconfigured several times since its original construction in 1922. For many years, the Rose Bowl stadium had the largest football stadium capacity in the United States, eventually being surpassed by Michigan Stadium in 1998. The maximum stated seating capacity was 104,594 from 1972 to 1997. Capacity was lowered after the 1998 game; the 2006 game, which was also the BCS championship game, attracted a crowd of 93,986; and there were 94,118 spectators at the 2011 game between TCU and Wisconsin. As of 2012, the Rose Bowl is number seven on the list of American football stadiums by capacity with a current official seating capacity of 92,542 and is still the largest stadium that hosts post-season bowl games. The Rose Bowl is also the only CFP bowl game that is held in a non-NFL stadium.

=== Team selection 1916–1946 ===
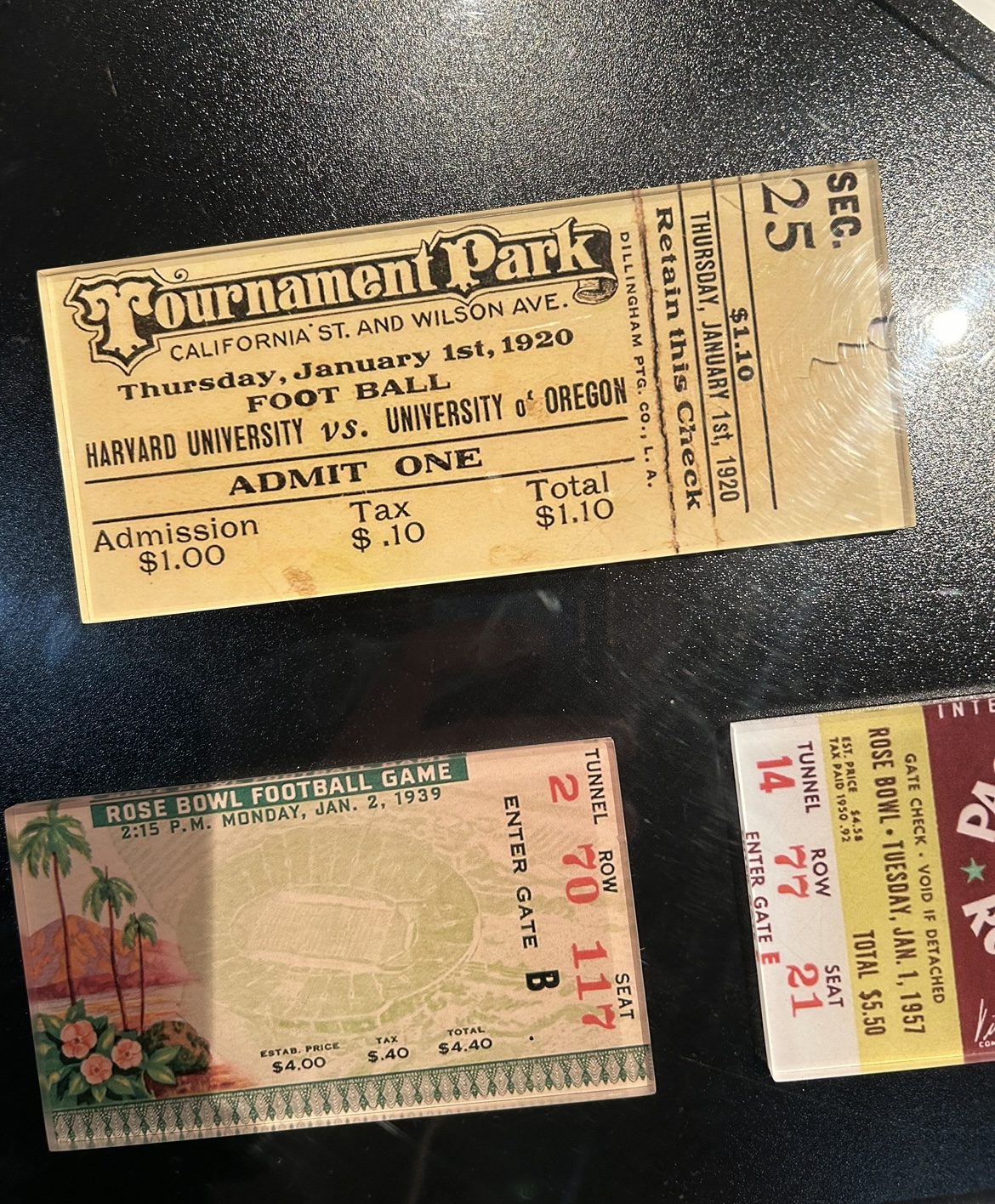
Tickets from the 1920 and 1939 Rose Bowl games, displayed at Rose Bowl's original locker room, which is now converted into a museum

In the game's early years, except during World War I, the Rose Bowl always pitted a team—not necessarily the conference champion—from the Pacific Coast Conference (PCC), the predecessor of the current Pac-12 Conference, against an opponent from the Eastern U.S. During the last two years of World War I, teams from military bases met in the Rose Bowl. During its history, a number of notable matchups have been made with the top football teams and top coaches of the time. These include the 1925 game, with Knute Rockne's Notre Dame and their Four Horsemen against "Pop" Warner's Stanford; the 1926 edition was the Alabama Crimson Tide's win over Washington, and 1940 featured Howard Jones' USC Trojans against Bob Neyland's Tennessee Volunteers. During this period, there were ten games in which undefeated teams were matched.

=== World War II – 1942 venue change to Durham, North Carolina ===
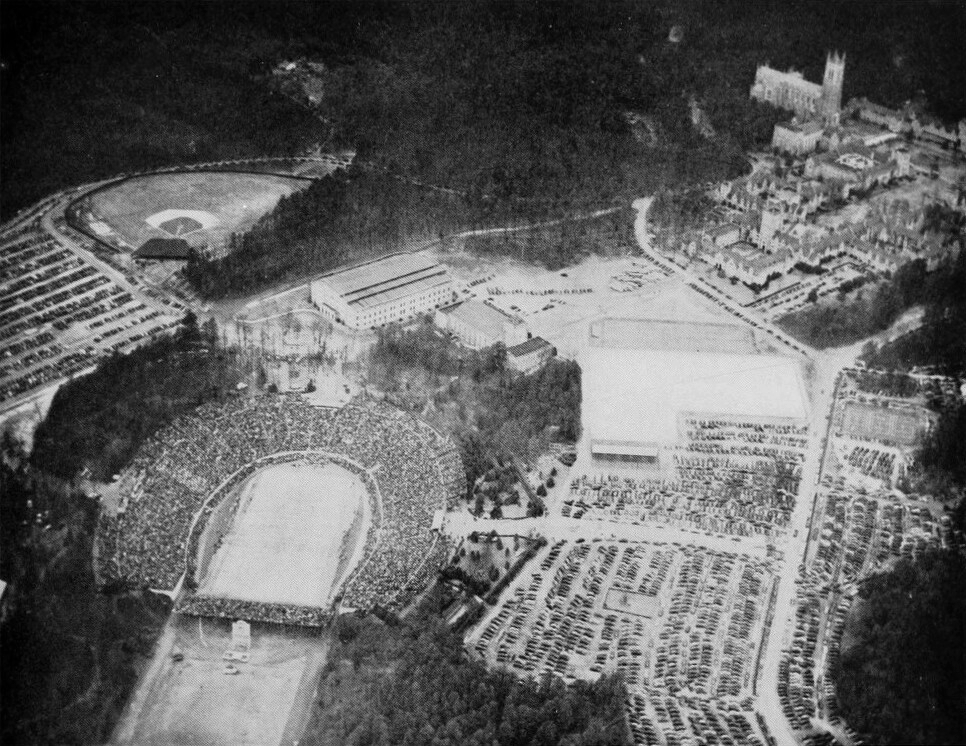
A packed Duke Stadium during the 1942 Rose Bowl

After the Japanese attack on Pearl Harbor on December 7, 1941, and a series of attacks on West Coast shipping beginning on December 18, there were concerns about a possible Japanese attack on the West Coast. The Rose Parade, with a million watchers, and the Rose Bowl, with 90,000 spectators, were presumed to be ideal targets for the Japanese. Lieutenant General John L. DeWitt recommended that the Rose Parade and Rose Bowl festivities be cancelled. The Rose Bowl committee originally planned to cancel the game. On December 16, Duke University invited the game and Oregon State to Duke's home stadium in Durham, North Carolina. After the 1942 Allied victory in the Battle of Midway and the end of the Japanese offensives in the Pacific Theater during 1942, it was deemed that a large portion of the West Coast was no longer vulnerable to attack, and the Rose Bowl Game continued on in the Rose Bowl stadium. The Tournament of Roses parade itself still was not held in 1943 because of the war.

=== Big Nine–PCC agreement ===
During World War II, many college football schools had dropped some conference opponents and instead played football against local military base teams. Many colleges could not even field teams because of the draft and manpower requirements. After the war was over, demobilization and the G.I. Bill enabled returning servicemen to attend college. The 1946 season was the first true post-war college football season with travel restrictions lifted and civilian college opponents returning to schedules.

The Big Nine and PCC were of the same accord when it came to treating players as amateurs, as compared to the semi-professional status that the Southern Universities proposed. Also, the Big Nine and PCC both had the same attitudes towards desegregation and allowing African-Americans to play football. Many other universities were still segregated. None of the Southeastern Conference schools had an African American athlete until 1966. The Cotton Bowl, Orange Bowl, and Sugar Bowl would not be integrated until 1948, 1955, and 1956 respectively.

The Big Nine agreed in 1946, after eight years of negotiating over payments, rules, and ticket allocations, to a five-year exclusive deal with the Rose Bowl to send the conference champion to meet the PCC champion. UCLA, USC, Minnesota and Illinois all voted against it. The 1947 Rose Bowl, with UCLA meeting Illinois, was the first game under this agreement.

=== Big Ten–AAWU/Pac-8/10/12 agreement ===
When the PCC dissolved prior to the 1959 season following a pay-for-play scandal in 1958, there was no official agreement in force. The Tournament of Roses selected from the former members of PCC and invited Washington, the first champion of the newly formed Athletic Association of Western Universities (AAWU), to play Big Ten champion Wisconsin in the 1960 Rose Bowl. The Big Ten authorized its members to accept any Rose Bowl invitation at their discretion.

The AAWU signed an agreement with the Rose Bowl that remained in force from the 1961 Rose Bowl until the advent of the BCS era in 1998. In 1962, after Minnesota changed its vote against pursuing a new agreement (resolving a 5–5 voting deadlock which had prevented any new negotiations for years), a Big Ten agreement was finalized, which went into effect with the 1963 Rose Bowl and lasted until the BCS era.

While the Big Ten supplied the "East" representative and the PCC, AAWU, or Pac-8/10 supplied the "West" representative from the 1947 Rose Bowl to the BCS era, an "exclusive" Rose Bowl agreement did not exist throughout this period. In particular, the Big Ten was not part of any agreement for at least the 1961 and 1962 games. In particular, the 1961 Big Ten champion Ohio State, declined the invitation to play in the 1962 game without penalty.

The AAWU used "Big Five", "Big Six", and "Pacific-8" as unofficial nicknames (each reflecting the number of conference members). It officially adopted the "Pacific-8" name for the 1968 season. The name changed to "Pacific-10" with the arrival of Arizona and Arizona State in 1978, its last official name change prior to the formation of the BCS in 1998. The Big Ten Conference retained the same name throughout this period, even though it had eleven members by the start of the BCS era because of the addition of Penn State in 1990.

Both conferences had a "no repeat" rule in force for a number of years. Under this rule, any team that had appeared in the Rose Bowl game the previous season could not go, even if they were the conference champion. The notable exception was Minnesota playing in the 1961 and 1962 games during the period when the conference agreements were in a state of flux. Second-ranked Ohio State did not participate because its faculty council voted it down, allowing Minnesota to return. The PCC's rule went into effect following California's third straight defeat in 1951 and ended with conference's disbandment in the summer of 1959; it affected the 1955 and 1958 games. The Big Ten abolished their rule in 1972; it had recently affected the 1966 game. Southern California played in four consecutive Rose Bowl games from 1967 to 1970; Ohio State played in four straight from 1973 to 1976.

Both conferences also had "exclusive agreements" with the Rose Bowl game, in the sense that member schools were not allowed to play in any other bowl game. Both conferences abolished this rule before the 1975 NCAA Division I football season. As a result, Michigan and USC were allowed to play in the 1976 Orange Bowl and the 1975 Liberty Bowl, respectively.

=== Bowl Championship Series ===
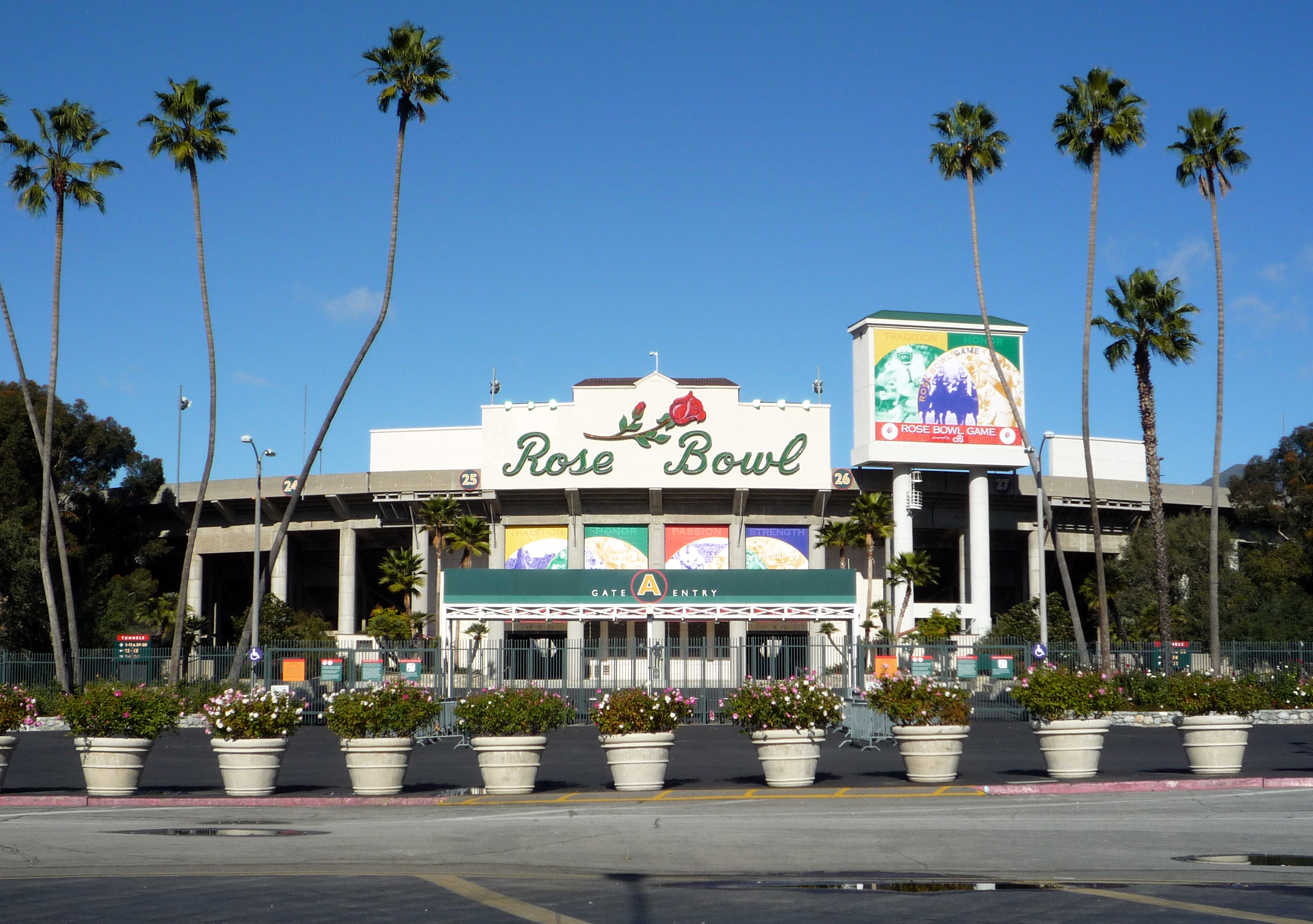
The Rose Bowl with the banners for the Rose Bowl Game (the right scoreboard had been removed during the 2011 renovation)

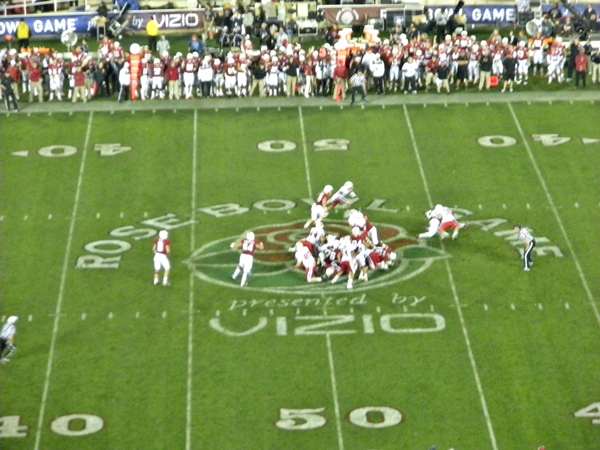
Stanford defeated Wisconsin 20–14 in the 2013 Rose Bowl on January 1, 2013

As of the 1998 season, with the creation of the Bowl Championship Series (BCS), team selection for the Rose Bowl was tied to the other three BCS bowls, although in any given year the Rose Bowl still attempted, if possible, to maintain the traditional Pac-10 (Pac-12 after the addition of Utah and Colorado in 2011) versus Big Ten format (though if the champion from either or both conference was ranked BCS #1 or #2, they were allowed into the national championship game and were replaced by another team, typically from the same conference as the team being replaced). Twice in this era, the Rose Bowl had served as the BCS championship game.

The 2002 game served as the BCS championship game between the BCS No. 1–ranked Miami, then a member of the Big East Conference, and the BCS No. 2–ranked Nebraska, then a member of the Big 12 Conference. The Nebraska selection as the BCS No. 2 team was controversial because Oregon was ranked No. 2 in both the AP and Coaches Polls, while Nebraska was ranked No. 4 in both polls and did not play in its conference championship game (No. 3 Colorado, who would play Oregon in that year's Fiesta Bowl, did and won the Big 12's automatic bid to the BCS). This prevented a West Coast team playing in the Rose Bowl for the first time, and it also marked the first matchup since 1946 not to feature the traditional pairing of Pac-10 vs. Big Ten teams.

The 2006 Rose Bowl game featured offensive powerhouses Texas, riding a 19-game winning streak, and USC, which entered the game with a 34-game winning streak and two Heisman Trophy winners. Texas won 41–38. The game had a television viewership of 35.6 million, the highest for college football contest since the 1987 Fiesta Bowl between Penn State and Miami.

On two other occasions during the BCS era, Rose Bowl participation had expanded beyond the Big Ten and Pac-10. The 2003 Rose Bowl couldn't select Big Ten co-champion and automatic qualifier Ohio State, who finished No. 2 in the BCS and thus received a bid to the Fiesta Bowl to play for the national championship. The Rose Bowl was poised to select Big Ten co-champion Iowa as an at-large in order to preserve the traditional Big Ten/Pac-10 match up. However, the Orange Bowl, which selected ahead of the Rose Bowl that year, chose the Hawkeyes. As a result, the Rose Bowl featured the first appearance by Oklahoma, who faced Pac-10 Champion Washington State. The 2005 game featured Texas of the Big 12 Conference, selected, amid some controversy, over California of the Pac-10, marking the second time a West Coast team did not make the Rose Bowl. The controversy was the result of the BCS computer rankings which elevated Texas over California. Texas went on to defeat Michigan in the 2005 game, featuring a four-touchdown performance by Vince Young, foreshadowing his 467-yard performance a year later in the 2006 defeat of USC that won the National Title for Texas.

The 2004 game is also noteworthy. In this game, USC defeated Michigan, 28–14, thus earning the top ranking in the AP Poll and a share of the national championship with BCS champion LSU. USC, despite being No. 1 in the AP poll, did not qualify for the BCS championship game because of their standing in the BCS system.

The second BCS-era Rose Bowl arrangement ran from 2004 through 2014. The Big Ten and Pac-12 (the new name of the Pac-10) retained their bids, but a provision was inserted mandating that the first time that either conference could not fill their bid (because a school from the Big Ten or Pac-12 qualifies for the BCS National Championship Game), and if a non-BCS conference school qualified, the Rose Bowl was required to take that school. As a result, Texas Christian University (TCU) became the first team from a non-automatic qualifying conference to play in the Rose Bowl in the BCS era. The 2010 TCU Horned Frogs finished their second consecutive regular season at 12–0, were back-to-back champions of the Mountain West Conference, and ranked No. 3 in the final BCS Poll. TCU defeated No. 5 Wisconsin 21–19 in the 2011 Rose Bowl. TCU's appearance satisfied the 'first time' clause of the agreement.

The 100th Rose Bowl Game featured a traditional pairing of Big Ten champion versus Pac-12 champion, with Michigan State playing against Stanford on January 1, 2014. Michigan State won the game, 24–20.

The Bowl Championship Series format ended with the 2014 BCS National Championship Game, played at the Rose Bowl Stadium on January 6.

=== College Football Playoff ===
The BCS was replaced by the College Football Playoff (CFP) in 2014, seeding four teams into two national semifinal games, leading to a championship game. As part of the arrangement, the Rose Bowl game was selected as a semifinal playoff game every three years. In years when the Rose Bowl is not part of the playoff, it takes the Pac-12 and Big Ten champions, unless one or both teams qualify for the playoff, in which case they are replaced by an alternate team from the same conference.

The first game under the new arrangement was played on January 1, 2015, and was known as the College Football Playoff semifinal at the Rose Bowl Game presented by Northwestern Mutual. It featured the Oregon Ducks of the Pac-12 Conference and the Florida State Seminoles, the first Atlantic Coast Conference (ACC) team to participate in the Rose Bowl. Oregon defeated Florida State, 59–20, ending the Seminoles' 29-game winning streak, which dated back to the end of the 2012 season. As a result, Oregon advanced to the 2015 CFP National Championship played on January 12. The 59 points were a new Rose Bowl Game scoring record for a team.

The 2016 Rose Bowl featured Pac-12 champions Stanford against Big Ten West Division champions Iowa. Stanford defeated Iowa, 45–16, scoring 35 points in the first half, the most points ever scored in the first half of a Rose Bowl. The 2017 Rose Bowl featured Penn State of the Big Ten and USC of the Pac-12. Penn State set a record for the most points score by a losing team in a Rose Bowl, as USC won, 52–49.

In the 2018 Rose Bowl, the Georgia Bulldogs (12–1) defeated the Oklahoma Sooners (12–1), 54–48, in double overtime in a semifinal playoff game to advance to the 2018 CFP National Championship game. It was the first Rose Bowl game to go into overtime. The 2024 Rose Bowl, also a semifinal playoff game, became the second Rose Bowl game requiring overtime, as Michigan (13–0) defeated Alabama (12–1), 27–20.

==== COVID-19 – 2021 venue change to Arlington, Texas ====
In early December 2020, it was announced that the 2021 Rose Bowl, a CFP semifinal game, would be contested behind closed doors without fans, due to California Governor Gavin Newsom's orders in response to the COVID-19 pandemic in California. This was met with criticism, including from Notre Dame head coach Brian Kelly, who wanted players' families to be allowed to attend. On December 19, it was reported that a request by the Tournament of Roses to the State of California, requesting a special exemption to allow some fans to attend, was denied. Later that day, the CFP announced that the semifinal game would be moved from Pasadena to AT&T Stadium in Arlington, Texas. It was not immediately clear if the game would still be called the Rose Bowl. A press release from the Pasadena Tournament of Roses stated:

"It is not yet determined if the CFP semifinal in Dallas will be called the CFP Semifinal at the Rose Bowl Game presented by Capital One. The name is a part of the Master License Agreement and is co-owned by the Pasadena Tournament of Roses and the City of Pasadena."

On December 30, the City of Pasadena and the Tournament of Roses announced that the game in Arlington could use the Rose Bowl name. The only prior instance of the game being played outside of Pasadena was the 1942 edition.

=== College Football Playoff Quarterfinal ===
In 2024, the College Football Playoff expanded to twelve teams. As a result of CFP quarterfinal games being played on or around New Year's Day and semifinal games now being played at least one week later, the Rose Bowl Game became a permanent quarterfinal to maintain its traditional spot on New Year's Day. The Rose Bowl is the only CFP bowl to not be in the rotation to host a semifinal. Starting in 2026, the top three seeds will select their quarterfinal bowl.

== Conference tie-ins ==
From 1947 to 2024, the Rose Bowl Game traditionally hosted conference champions from the Big Ten and Pac-12, or the champions of their predecessors. Starting in 2002, the Rose Bowl Game occasionally deviated from its traditional matchups for use in "national championship" systems. In 2002 and 2006 (the games following the 2001 and 2005 seasons), under the Bowl Championship Series (BCS) system, the Rose Bowl was designated as its championship game, and hosted the top two teams determined by the BCS system. In 2010, TCU of the Mountain West was selected to fill Oregon's spot in the Bowl, to maintain the traditional "East v. West" matchup. As of the 2014 season, the Rose Bowl became part of the College Football Playoff (CFP) as one of the New Year's Six bowls—the top six major bowl games in the national championship system—hosting one of the semifinal games every three years. During non-CFP years, the Rose Bowl reverted to its traditional Pac-12/Big Ten matchup, unless the champions from those conferences were selected to play in the CFP.

With the expansion of the College Football Playoff, the top-ranked team from the Big Ten was placed in the Rose Bowl Game in 2025 and 2026, and the 2025 game featured two Big Ten teams. Starting in 2026, the top three seeds will select their quarterfinal bowl, removing the conference tie-ins after 80 seasons.

== Sponsorship and broadcasting rights ==
=== Sponsorship ===
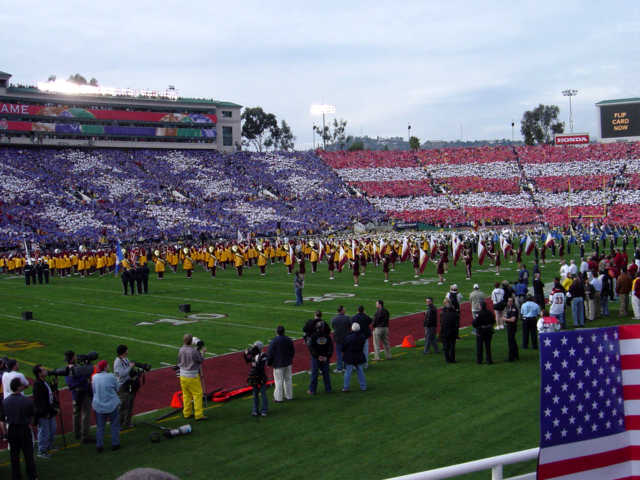
Large card stunt in 2004

For many years the Rose Bowl eschewed sponsorship, but in 1999, it became "The Rose Bowl Game presented by AT&T." Unlike the other bowl games, the sponsor was not added to the title of the game, but instead as a presenter. In 2002 it was branded The Rose Bowl Game presented by PlayStation 2. From 2003 to 2010, after the agreement with Sony expired, the game was presented by Citi.

In June 2010, Citi decided to end sponsorship of the Rose Bowl games, including the National Championship game. In October 2010, HDTV maker Vizio signed a 4-year contract to be the official sponsor of the Rose Bowl games through 2014. After Vizio declined to renew sponsorship in 2014, financial services giant Northwestern Mutual became the new presenting sponsor. From 2015 to 2020, the game was sponsored by Northwestern Mutual and officially known as the Rose Bowl Game presented by Northwestern Mutual.

The 2021 edition, sponsored by Capital One, was officially known as the Rose Bowl Game presented by Capital One. As the sponsor of the 2021 Orange Bowl, Capital One became the first company to sponsor two New Year's Six bowls. Capital One continued their sponsorship of the game, with the 2022 edition officially being named the Rose Bowl Game presented by Capital One Venture X after the company's travel rewards credit card.

Prudential Financial became the new sponsor of the Rose Bowl in 2023 and will continue until the 2026 game.

=== Broadcasters ===
The Rose Bowl was first televised in 1947 on W6XYZ, an experimental station in Los Angeles that would eventually become KTLA. The 1952 game was the first nationally televised bowl game and the first nationally televised college game of any sport. From 1952 to 1988, the Rose Bowl was televised by NBC at 2 p.m. PST, and in most years was the only New Year's Day bowl airing at that time. The 1956 Rose Bowl has the highest TV rating of all college bowl games, watched by 41.1% of all people in the US with TV sets. The 1962 game was the first college football game broadcast in color. Television ratings for the Rose Bowl declined as the number of bowl games increased. The other bowl games also provided more compelling match-ups, with higher-ranked teams. In 1988, NBC gave up the broadcast rights, as the television share dropped in 1987 below 20.

From 1989 to 2010, the game was broadcast on ABC. The first 9-year contract in 1988 started at about $11 million, which is what NBC had been paying.

The 2005 edition was the first broadcast in high definition. Beginning in 2007, Fox had the broadcast rights to the other Bowl Championship Series games, but the Rose Bowl, which negotiated its own television contract independent of the BCS, had agreed to keep the game on ABC. Beginning with the 2010 season, ESPN (majority-owned by ABC's parent company, The Walt Disney Company) now broadcasts all the BCS/CFP games, including the Rose Bowl game. The game is also broadcast nationally by ESPN Radio and by ESPN International for Latin America. In 2013, ESPN Deportes provided the first Spanish language telecast in the U.S. of the Rose Bowl Game. ESPN's contract was extended on June 28, 2012, to 2026, for a reported $80 million per year. In 2024, ESPN renewed all rights to the College Football Playoff through 2032, as part of a contract collectively valued at $1.3 billion per .

The Rose Bowl has traditionally had a 2 p.m. PT (5 p.m. ET) kickoff; the visual of the afternoon sun setting on the San Gabriel Mountains has been recognized as an important part of the tradition of the game. Due to its hosting of the 2002 BCS National Championship, the 2002 Rose Bowl was rescheduled for prime time on the east coast with a 5 p.m. PT (8 p.m. ET) kickoff. In 2026, the game was moved to 1 p.m. PT (4 p.m. ET) to avoid impacting the start time of the Sugar Bowl; the change was expected to persist for future games. The Rose Bowl has not yet been given a time slot for 2027.

== Game results ==
Winners appear in boldface while italics denote a tie game.

All rankings are taken from the AP poll (inaugurated in 1936, prior to the 1937 Rose Bowl) before each game was played.

No.	Date played	West / Pac-12		East / Big Ten		Attendance	Notes
1	January 1, 1902	Stanford	0	**Michigan**	**49**	8,000	notes
2	January 1, 1916	**Washington State**	**14**	Brown	0	7,000	notes
3	January 1, 1917	**Oregon**	**14**	Penn	0	26,000	notes
4	January 1, 1918 (Note: During World War I, military teams played)	**Mare Island – USMC**	**19**	Camp Lewis – US Army	7	25,000	notes
5	January 1, 1919	Mare Island – USMC	0	**Great Lakes – US Navy**	**17**	25,000	notes
6	January 1, 1920	Oregon	6	**Harvard**	**7**	30,000	notes
7	January 1, 1921	**California**	**28**	Ohio State	0	42,000	notes
8	January 2, 1922	California	0	Washington & Jefferson	0	40,000	notes
9	January 1, 1923	**USC**	**14**	Penn State	3	43,000	notes
10	January 1, 1924	Washington	14	Navy	14	40,000	notes
11	January 1, 1925	Stanford	10	**Notre Dame**	**27**	53,000	notes
12	January 1, 1926	Washington	19	**Alabama**	**20**	50,000	notes
13	January 1, 1927	Stanford	7	Alabama	7	57,417	notes
14	January 2, 1928	**Stanford**	**7**	Pittsburgh	6	65,000	notes
15	January 1, 1929	California	7	**Georgia Tech**	**8**	66,604	notes
16	January 1, 1930	**USC**	**47**	Pittsburgh	14	72,000	notes
17	January 1, 1931	Washington State	0	**Alabama**	**24**	60,000	notes
18	January 1, 1932	**USC**	**21**	Tulane	12	75,562	notes
19	January 2, 1933	**USC**	**35**	Pittsburgh	0	78,874	notes
20	January 1, 1934	Stanford	0	**Columbia**	**7**	35,000	notes
21	January 1, 1935	Stanford	13	**Alabama**	**29**	84,474	notes
22	January 1, 1936	**Stanford**	**7**	SMU	0	84,474	notes
23	January 1, 1937	#5 Washington	0	**#3 Pittsburgh**	**21**	87,196	notes
24	January 1, 1938	**#2 California**	**13**	#4 Alabama	0	90,000	notes
25	January 2, 1939	**#7 USC**	**7**	#3 Duke	3	89,452	notes
26	January 1, 1940	**#3 USC**	**14**	#2 Tennessee	0	92,200	notes
27	January 1, 1941	**#2 Stanford**	**21**	#7 Nebraska	13	91,500	notes
28	January 1, 1942	**#12 Oregon State**	**20**	#2 Duke	16	56,000	notes
29	January 1, 1943	#13 UCLA	0	**#2 Georgia**	**9**	93,000	notes
30	January 1, 1944	**USC**	**29**	#12 Washington	0	68,000	notes
31	January 1, 1945	**#7 USC**	**25**	#12 Tennessee	0	91,000	notes
32	January 1, 1946	#11 USC	14	**#3 Alabama**	**34**	93,000	notes
33	January 1, 1947	#4 UCLA	14	**#5 Illinois**	**45**	90,000	notes
34	January 1, 1948	#8 USC	0	**#2 Michigan**	**49**	93,000	notes
35	January 1, 1949	#4 California	14	**#7 Northwestern**	**20**	93,000	notes
36	January 2, 1950	#3 California	14	**#6 Ohio State**	**17**	100,963	notes
37	January 1, 1951	#5 California	6	**#9 Michigan**	**14**	98,939	notes
38	January 1, 1952	#7 Stanford	7	**#4 Illinois**	**40**	96,825	notes
39	January 1, 1953	**#5 USC**	**7**	#11 Wisconsin	0	101,500	notes
40	January 1, 1954	#5 UCLA	20	**#3 Michigan State**	**28**	101,000	notes
41	January 1, 1955	#17 USC	7	**#1 Ohio State**	**20**	89,191	notes
42	January 2, 1956	#4 UCLA	14	**#2 Michigan State**	**17**	100,809	notes
43	January 1, 1957	#10 Oregon State	19	**#3 Iowa**	**35**	97,126	notes
44	January 1, 1958	Oregon	7	**#2 Ohio State**	**10**	98,202	notes
45	January 1, 1959	#16 California	12	**#2 Iowa**	**38**	98,297	notes
46	January 1, 1960	**#8 Washington**	**44**	#6 Wisconsin	8	100,809	notes
47	January 2, 1961	**#6 Washington**	**17**	#1 Minnesota	7	97,314	notes
48	January 1, 1962	#16 UCLA	3	**#6 Minnesota**	**21**	98,214	notes
49	January 1, 1963	**#1 USC**	**42**	#2 Wisconsin	37	98,698	notes
50	January 1, 1964	Washington	7	**#3 Illinois**	**17**	96,957	notes
51	January 1, 1965	#8 Oregon State	7	**#4 Michigan**	**34**	100,423	notes
52	January 1, 1966	**#5 UCLA**	**14**	#1 Michigan State	12	100,087	notes
53	January 2, 1967	USC	13	**#7 Purdue**	**14**	100,807	notes
54	January 1, 1968	**#1 USC**	**14**	#4 Indiana	3	102,946	notes
55	January 1, 1969	#2 USC	16	**#1 Ohio State**	**27**	102,063	notes
56	January 1, 1970	**#5 USC**	**10**	#7 Michigan	3	103,878	notes
57	January 1, 1971	**#12 Stanford**	**27**	#2 Ohio State	17	103,839	notes
58	January 1, 1972	**#16 Stanford**	**13**	#4 Michigan	12	103,154	notes
59	January 1, 1973	**#1 USC**	**42**	#3 Ohio State	17	106,869	notes
60	January 1, 1974	#7 USC	21	**#4 Ohio State**	**42**	105,267	notes
61	January 1, 1975	**#5 USC**	**18**	#3 Ohio State	17	106,721	notes
62	January 1, 1976	**#11 UCLA**	**23**	#1 Ohio State	10	105,464	notes
63	January 1, 1977	**#3 USC**	**14**	#2 Michigan	6	106,182	notes
64	January 2, 1978	**#13 Washington**	**27**	#4 Michigan	20	105,312	notes
65	January 1, 1979	**#3 USC**	**17**	#5 Michigan	10	105,629	notes
66	January 1, 1980	**#3 USC**	**17**	#1 Ohio State	16	105,526	notes
67	January 1, 1981	#16 Washington	6	**#5 Michigan**	**23**	104,863	notes
68	January 1, 1982	**#12 Washington**	**28**	#13 Iowa	0	105,611	notes
69	January 1, 1983	**#5 UCLA**	**24**	#19 Michigan	14	104,991	notes
70	January 2, 1984	**UCLA**	**45**	#4 Illinois	9	103,217	notes
71	January 1, 1985	**#18 USC**	**20**	#6 Ohio State	17	102,594	notes
72	January 1, 1986	**#13 UCLA**	**45**	#4 Iowa	28	103,292	notes
73	January 1, 1987	**#7 Arizona State**	**22**	#4 Michigan	15	103,168	notes
74	January 1, 1988	#16 USC	17	**#8 Michigan State**	**20**	103,847	notes
75	January 2, 1989	#5 USC	14	**#11 Michigan**	**22**	101,688	notes
76	January 1, 1990	**#12 USC**	**17**	#3 Michigan	10	103,450	notes
77	January 1, 1991	**#8 Washington**	**46**	#17 Iowa	34	101,273	notes
78	January 1, 1992	**#2 Washington**	**34**	#4 Michigan	14	103,566	notes
79	January 1, 1993	#9 Washington	31	**#7 Michigan**	**38**	94,236	notes
80	January 1, 1994	#14 UCLA	16	**#9 Wisconsin**	**21**	101,237	notes
81	January 2, 1995	#12 Oregon	20	**#2 Penn State**	**38**	102,247	notes
82	January 1, 1996	**#17 USC**	**41**	#3 Northwestern	32	100,102	notes
83	January 1, 1997	#2 Arizona State	17	**#4 Ohio State**	**20**	100,635	notes
84	January 1, 1998	#8 Washington State	16	**#1 Michigan**	**21**	101,219	notes
85	January 1, 1999	#6 UCLA	31	**#9 Wisconsin**	**38**	93,872	notes
86	January 1, 2000	#22 Stanford	9	**#4 Wisconsin**	**17**	93,731	notes
87	January 1, 2001	**#4 Washington**	**34**	#14 Purdue	24	94,392	notes
88	January 3, 2002^{BCS}	#4 Nebraska	14	**#1 Miami (FL)**	**37**	93,781	notes
89	January 1, 2003	#7 Washington State	14	**#8 Oklahoma**	**34**	86,848	notes
90	January 1, 2004	**#1 USC**	**28**	#4 Michigan	14	93,849	notes
91	January 1, 2005	**#6 Texas**	**38**	#13 Michigan	37	93,468	notes
92	January 4, 2006^{BCS}	#1 USC	38	**#2 Texas**	**41**	93,986	notes
93	January 1, 2007	**#8 USC**	**32**	#3 Michigan	18	93,852	notes
94	January 1, 2008	**#6 USC**	**49**	#13 Illinois	17	93,923	notes
95	January 1, 2009	**#5 USC**	**38**	#6 Penn State	24	93,293	notes
96	January 1, 2010	#7 Oregon	17	**#8 Ohio State**	**26**	93,963	notes
97	January 1, 2011	**#3 TCU**	**21**	#4 Wisconsin	19	94,118	notes
98	January 2, 2012	**#6 Oregon**	**45**	#9 Wisconsin	38	91,245	notes
99	January 1, 2013	**#8 Stanford**	**20**	#23 Wisconsin	14	93,359	notes
100	January 1, 2014	#5 Stanford	20	**#4 Michigan State**	**24**	95,173	notes
101	January 1, 2015^{SF}	**#3 Oregon**	**59**	#2 Florida State	20	91,322	notes
102	January 1, 2016	**#5 Stanford**	**45**	#6 Iowa	16	94,268	notes
103	January 2, 2017	**#9 USC**	**52**	#5 Penn State	49	95,128	notes
104	January 1, 2018^{SF}	#2 Oklahoma	48 (2OT)	**#3 Georgia**	**54**	92,844	notes
105	January 1, 2019	#9 Washington	23	**#5 Ohio State**	**28**	91,853	notes
106	January 1, 2020	**#7 Oregon**	**28**	#11 Wisconsin	27	90,462	notes
107	January 1, 2021^{SF}	**#1 Alabama**	**31**	#4 Notre Dame	14	18,373	notes
108	January 1, 2022	#10 Utah	45	**#7 Ohio State**	**48**	87,842	notes
109	January 2, 2023	#7 Utah	21	**#9 Penn State**	**35**	94,873	notes
110	January 1, 2024^{SF}	#5 Alabama	20 (OT)	**#1 Michigan**	**27**	96,371	notes
111	January 1, 2025^{QF}	#1 Oregon	21	**#6 Ohio State**	**41**	90,732	notes
112	January 1, 2026^{QF}	#11 Alabama	3	**#1 Indiana**	**38**	90,278	notes

^BCS Denotes BCS National Championship Game
^QF Denotes College Football Playoff quarterfinal game
^SF Denotes College Football Playoff semifinal game

=== Appearances and win–loss records ===
The below tables list results by teams competing as members of the Big Ten Conference, Pac-12 Conference, and all other participants. Included in Pac-12 results are teams who competed as a member of the Pacific Coast Conference, Pacific-8 Conference, or Pacific-10 Conference—predecessors of the Pac-12. One team, Oregon, has appearances both as a member of the Pac-12 (or its predecessors) and as a member of the Big Ten.

Updated through the January 2026 edition (112 games, 224 total appearances).

Big Ten and Pac-12 teams
Team	Conf.	Games	W	L	T	Latest
USC	Pac	34	25	9	–	2017
Ohio State	B1G	17	10	7	–	2025
Michigan	B1G	21	9	12	–	2024
Washington	Pac	15	7	7	1	2019
Stanford†	Pac	14	7	6	1	2016
UCLA	Pac	12	5	7	–	1999
Wisconsin	B1G	10	3	7	–	2020
Oregon	Pac	8	4	4	–	2020
Oregon	B1G	1	0	1	–	2025
California	Pac	8	2	5	1	1959
Iowa	B1G	6	2	4	–	2016
Michigan State	B1G	5	4	1	–	2014
Illinois	B1G	5	3	2	–	2008
Penn State†	B1G	4	2	2	–	2023
Oregon State	Pac	3	1	2	–	1965
Washington State†	Pac	3	0	3	–	2003
Arizona State	Pac	2	1	1	–	1997
Minnesota	B1G	2	1	1	–	1962
Northwestern	B1G	2	1	1	–	1996
Purdue	B1G	2	1	1	–	2001
Utah	Pac	2	0	2	–	2023
Indiana	B1G	2	1	1	–	2026
Big Ten Conference	B1G	77	37	40	0	2026
Pac-12 Conference	Pac	101	52	46	3	2023

Other teams
Team	Games	W	L	T	Latest
Alabama	9	5	3	1	2026
Military teams	4	2	2	–	1919
Pittsburgh	4	1	3	–	1937
Texas	2	2	0	–	2006
Georgia	2	2	0	–	2018
Notre Dame	2	1	1	–	2021
Oklahoma	2	1	1	–	2018
Duke	2	0	2	–	1942
Nebraska†	2	0	2	–	2002
Tennessee	2	0	2	–	1945
Columbia	1	1	0	–	1934
Georgia Tech	1	1	0	–	1929
Harvard	1	1	0	–	1920
Miami (FL)	1	1	0	–	2002
TCU	1	1	0	–	2011
Washington State†	1	1	0	–	1916
Navy	1	0	0	1	1924
Washington & Jefferson	1	0	0	1	1922
Stanford†	1	0	1	–	1902
Brown	1	0	1	–	1916
Florida State	1	0	1	–	2015
Penn State†	1	0	1	–	1923
Penn	1	0	1	–	1917
SMU	1	0	1	–	1936
Tulane	1	0	1	–	1932
Other teams	46	20	23	3	2026

† Some teams who are members of the Pac-12 and Big Ten made appearances while not members; thus, the following results are included in the "Other teams" table:

- Penn State's January 1923 loss predates their joining of the Big Ten
- Nebraska's January 1941 and January 2002 losses predates their joining of the Big Ten
- Stanford's January 1902 loss predates formation of the Pacific Coast Conference, predecessor of the Pac-12
- Washington State's January 1916 win predates formation of the Pacific Coast Conference, predecessor of the Pac-12

Current Big Ten teams Maryland and Rutgers have never appeared in the Rose Bowl. Nebraska has appeared twice but never as a member of the Big Ten. In 2024, as part of a dissolution of the Pac-12, the Big Ten gained four teams that have represented the Pac-12 and its predecessors in the Rose Bowl numerous times: Oregon, UCLA, USC, and Washington. Oregon subsequently appeared in the 2025 game, a CFP quarterfinal, facing Ohio State in an all-Big Ten matchup.

=== Frequent participants ===
If there are any Big Ten teams that shoot for a national championship, they're damn fools ... You play to win the Big Ten championship, and if you win it and go to the Rose Bowl and win it, then you've had a great season.

— Bo Schembechler of Michigan, July 1989

Among Pac-8/10/12 and Big Ten schools, the record for longest drought since a team's last Rose Bowl appearance is held by California (1959), followed by Minnesota (1962), and Oregon State (1965).

Among Pac-8/10/12 and Big Ten schools who have played in at least one Rose Bowl, the record for the longest period since a win is held by Nebraska, who has never won, followed by Washington State (1916), Cal (1939), Oregon State (1942), Northwestern (1949), and Iowa (1959). As of 2016, head coaches Howard Jones (5–0) and John Robinson (4–0) lead the list of undefeated Rose Bowl records.

Archie Griffin of Ohio State and Brian Cushing of USC are the only players to ever start in four Rose Bowl games. Head coach Woody Hayes led Ohio State to the Rose Bowl from 1973 to 1976, while USC head coach Pete Carroll led the Trojans to the Rose Bowl from 2006 to 2009.

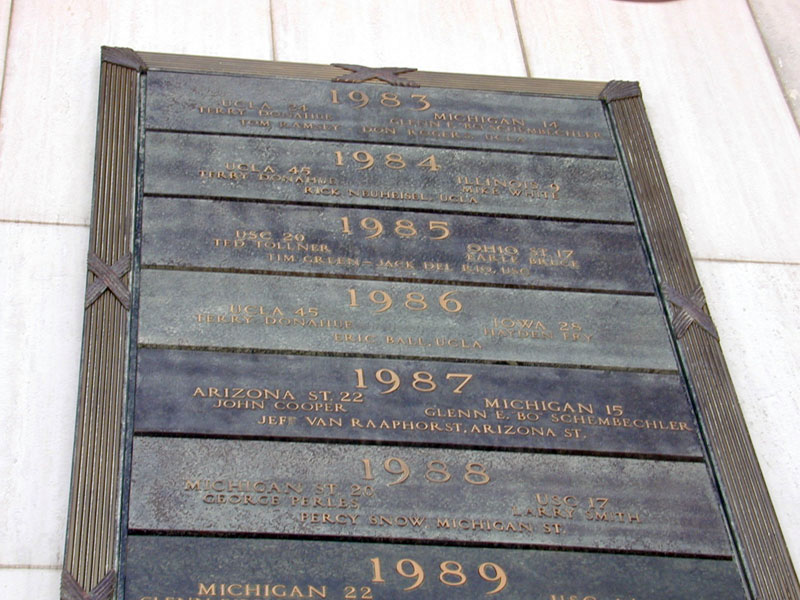
Rose Bowl records at the Hall of Champions

The current members of the Pac-12 or the Big Ten to have not appeared in the Rose Bowl are Maryland and Rutgers, who both joined the Big Ten in 2014. Former Pac-12 members Arizona (who joined the then-Pac-10 in 1978) and Colorado (who joined the Pac-12 in 2011) have never appeared in the Rose Bowl, both having left the Pac-12 in 2024. Former Pac-12 member California appeared in the Rose Bowl only as a member of a predecessor league to the Pac-12. Similar to Cal, Nebraska played in the 1941 and 2002 games, but was not a member of the Big Ten Conference at these times. Idaho and Montana, who were members of the Pacific Coast Conference from 1922 until 1958 and 1950 respectively, never finished near the top in the PCC football standings. Former Big Ten member Chicago withdrew from the league prior to the bowl arrangement being set.

USC has played the most Big Ten schools in the Rose Bowl. As of 2024, the only Big Ten opponents remaining for the Trojans are Iowa, Minnesota, and the schools that have never represented the conference in the Rose Bowl: Maryland, Nebraska, Rutgers, Oregon, UCLA, and Washington. Ohio State and Michigan are tied for playing the most current or former Pac-12 schools in the Rose Bowl. The Buckeyes have not played Oregon State or Washington State in the game, while Michigan has never played Oregon or Utah. Neither team has faced Arizona or Colorado, as these teams have never appeared in the game.

==== Common matchups ====
The most frequent Rose Bowl matchup is USC–Michigan, occurring for the eighth time in 2007, with USC holding a 6–2 advantage (including rare meetings outside the Rose Bowl, USC leads this series 6–5). The next most frequent matchup is USC–Ohio State, occurring for the seventh time in 1985, with USC holding a 4–3 advantage.

Matchups that have occurred more than once:

# of Times	West / Pac-12	East / Big Ten	Record	Years played
8	USC	Michigan	USC, 6–2	1948, 1970, 1977, 1979, 1989, 1990, 2004, 2007
7	USC	Ohio State	USC, 4–3	1955, 1969, 1973, 1974, 1975, 1980, 1985
4	Washington	Michigan	Tied, 2–2	1978, 1981, 1992, 1993
3	Oregon	Ohio State	Ohio State, 3–0	1958, 2010, 2025
3	USC	Penn State	USC, 3–0	1923, 2009, 2017
3	UCLA	Michigan State	Michigan State, 2–1	1954, 1956, 1966
2	Stanford	Michigan	Tied, 1–1	1902, 1972
2	California	Ohio State	Tied, 1–1	1921, 1950
2	Stanford	Alabama	Alabama, 1–0–1	1927, 1935
2	USC	Pittsburgh	USC, 2–0	1930, 1933
2	USC	Tennessee	USC, 2–0	1940, 1945
2	UCLA	Illinois	Tied, 1–1	1947, 1984
2	USC	Wisconsin	USC, 2–0	1953, 1963
2	Washington	Iowa	Washington, 2–0	1982, 1991
2	UCLA	Wisconsin	Wisconsin, 2–0	1994, 1999
2	Stanford	Wisconsin	Tied, 1–1	2000, 2013
2	Oregon	Wisconsin	Oregon, 2–0	2012, 2020

=== Top-ranked teams ===
No. 1 ranked teams at the end of the regular season that have played in the Rose Bowl game are listed below:

- 1955: No. 1 Ohio State defeated No. 17 USC, 20–7
- 1961: No. 6 Washington defeated No. 1 Minnesota, 17–7
- 1963: No. 1 USC defeated No. 2 Wisconsin, 42–37
- 1966: No. 5 UCLA defeated No. 1 Michigan State, 14–12
- 1968: No. 1 USC defeated No. 4 Indiana, 14–3
- 1969: No. 1 Ohio State defeated No. 2 USC, 27–16
- 1973: No. 1 USC defeated No. 3 Ohio State, 42-17
- 1976: No. 11 UCLA defeated No. 1 Ohio State, 23-10
- 1980: No. 3 USC defeated No. 1 Ohio State, 17–16
- 1998: No. 1 Michigan defeated No. 8 Washington State, 21–16
- 2002 (BCS National Championship Game): No. 1 Miami defeated No. 4 Nebraska, 37–14
- 2004: No. 1 USC defeated No. 4 Michigan, 28–14
- 2006 (BCS National Championship Game): No. 2 Texas defeated No. 1 USC, 41–38
- 2021 (CFP Semifinal Game): No. 1 Alabama defeated No. 4 Notre Dame, 31–14
- 2024 (CFP Semifinal Game): No. 1 Michigan defeated No. 4 Alabama, 27–20 (OT)
- 2025 (CFP Quarterfinal Game): No. 6 Ohio State defeated No. 1 Oregon 41–21
- 2026 (CFP Quarterfinal Game): No. 1 Indiana defeated No. 11 Alabama 38–3

=== Twice in a season ===
Six post-season rematches of regular-season games have taken place in the Rose Bowl. In three of those instances, the same team won both the regular season game and the Rose Bowl Game. UCLA won three of those six Rose Bowl games, including two o three instances in which a different team lost the regular season game but won the Rose Bowl Game.

- **1956** Iowa 14, Oregon State 13
  - 1957 Rose Bowl rematch: Iowa 35, Oregon State 19
- **1965** Michigan State 13, UCLA 3
  - 1966 Rose Bowl rematch: UCLA 14, Michigan State 12
- **1975** Ohio State 41, UCLA 20
  - 1976 Rose Bowl rematch: UCLA 23, Ohio State 10
- **1982** UCLA 31, Michigan 27
  - 1983 Rose Bowl rematch: UCLA 24, Michigan 14
- **1987** Michigan State 27, USC 13
  - 1988 Rose Bowl rematch: Michigan State 20, USC 17
- **2024** Oregon 32, Ohio State 31
  - 2025 Rose Bowl rematch: Ohio State 41, Oregon 21

== Game arrangements ==
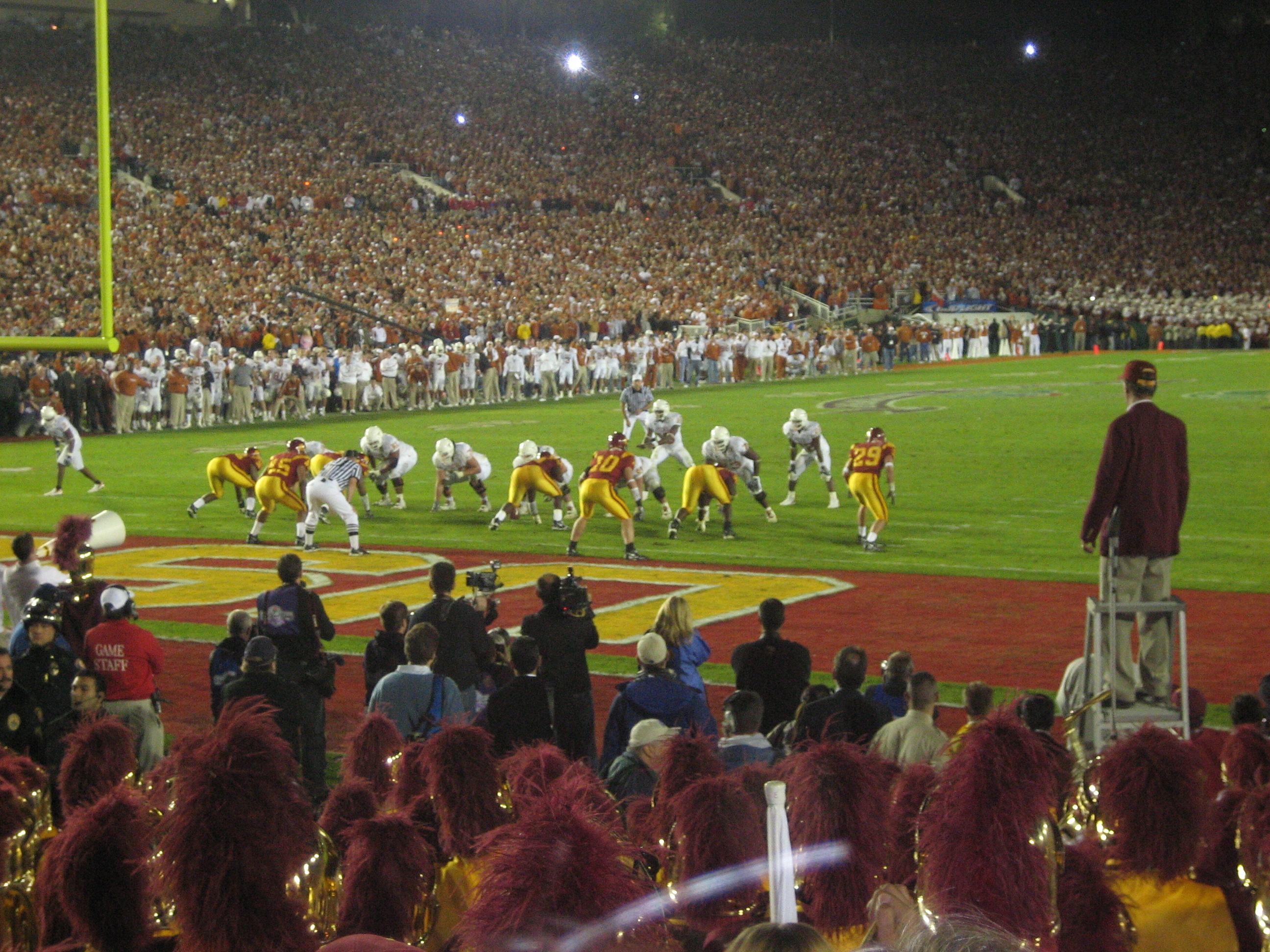
2006 Rose Bowl: Texas defeated Southern California 41–38 on January 4, 2006

Beginning with the 1947 Rose Bowl, the Pacific Coast representative was the home team, and the Big Nine representative was the visitor. This arrangement would alternate each year. The stadium seating started with the Big Nine representatives in the end zone, but eventually was set with the Big Ten fans and team on the West (press box) side, and Pacific-10 fans and team on the East side. The home team wears their darkest home jerseys, and the visiting team wears the white visiting jerseys. There have been exceptions to the uniform arrangement: UCLA wore their home jerseys, light blue, in the 1962, 1966, and 1976 Rose Bowl games, with the Big Ten opponent also wearing their home uniforms.

From 1947 through 2001, the Big Ten team was the home team in even-numbered years (concluding seasons that took place in odd-numbered years), and the Pac-10 team was the home team in odd-numbered years (concluding seasons that took place in even-numbered years). In 2003, Washington State was the home team but faced a non-Big Ten or Pac-10 school (Oklahoma of the Big 12) due to BCS selections that season. In 2005, Michigan served as the home team as a result of playing a Big 12 school, Texas, rather than a Pac-10 opponent.

Beginning with the 2002 Rose Bowl, Nebraska was home, with team and fans on the East sideline. From 2006 through 2013, the home team had been the team with the highest BCS season ending ranking. For the 2005 Rose Bowl, the Michigan team was on the East sideline; Texas was the visiting team and was on the West sideline. For the 2006 Rose Bowl, USC was the home team and Texas was the visiting team on the West sideline. Traditionally, the Big Ten (or its BCS replacement) is on the West side (press box) and the Pac-12 team is on the East side.

During the BCS era, the institution with the higher BCS ranking performed the national anthem, and performed first at halftime. With the exception of BCS championship years, the National Anthem was performed by the band. In BCS Championship years, a performer was invited to sing the Anthem, the last being LeAnn Rimes in 2006. The Rose Bowl does not have other performers (including notable recording artists) during the halftime show besides the school marching bands. As part of the television contract, a portion of each band's halftime performance is shown on television. Each school and each conference are allocated television spots to advertise. For the 100th game on January 1, 2014, Merry Clayton, Lisa Fischer, Judith Hill and Darlene Love sang the national anthem in honor of the song's 200th anniversary. This was the first time in Rose Bowl history that the anthem was performed by singers rather than by a marching band. Today, the institution with the higher ranking by the CFP selection committee performs the national anthem and performs first at halftime.

The coin toss was traditionally presented by the grand marshal of the Rose Parade or the president of the Pasadena Tournament of Roses Association (if the grand marshal was unable to attend the game).

== Player of the Game award ==
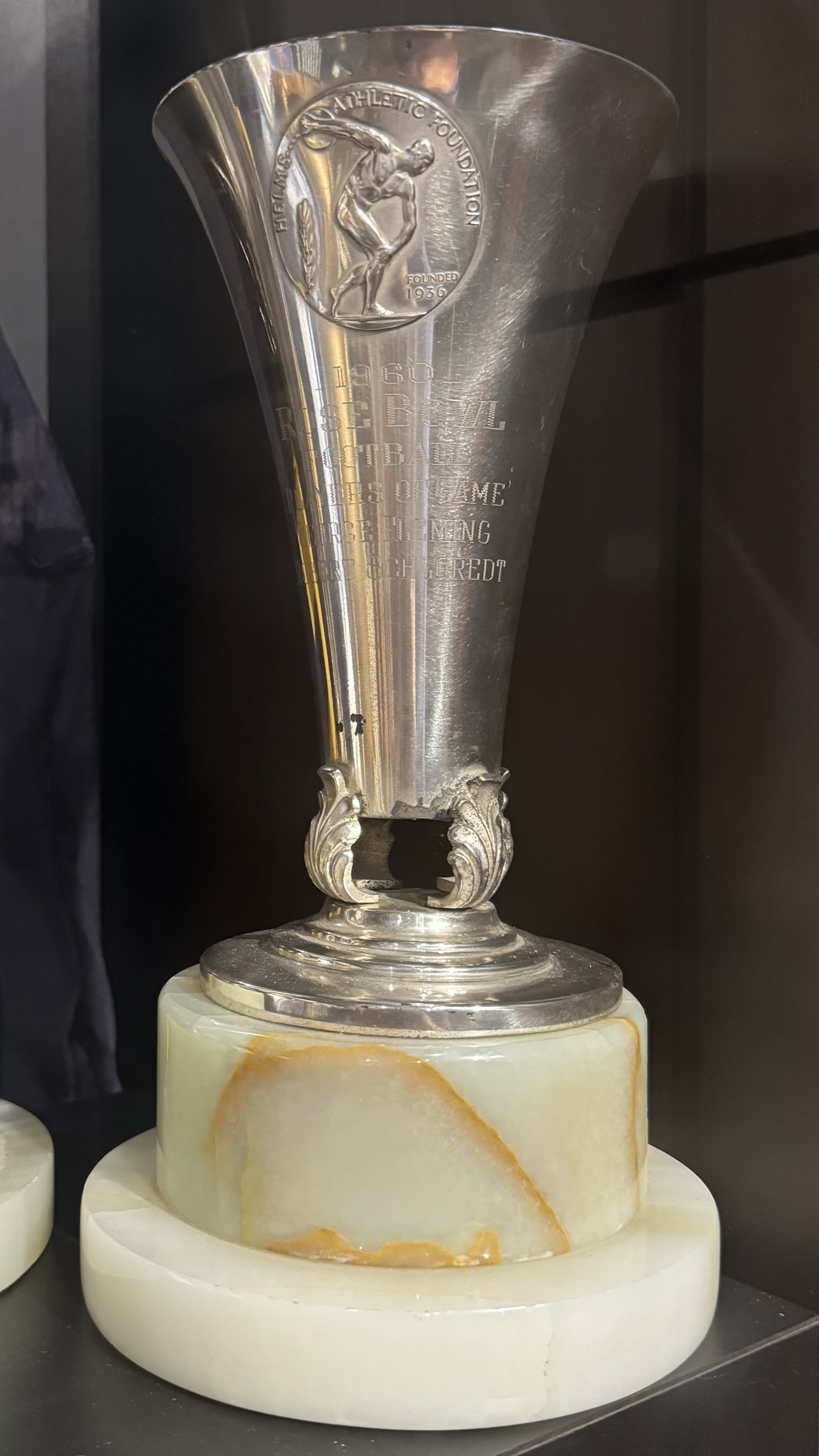
1960 Rose Bowl Player of the Game trophy, presented by the Helms Athletic Foundation

The Rose Bowl's most valuable player is presented the Player of the Game award. The Helms Athletic Foundation created the honor, which was first awarded in the 1940s. Helms executive director Bill Schroeder polled a Helms Hall Board composed of sportswriters to make the selection. The modern award selection continues to be made in collaboration with the national media covering the game.

Player of the Game honors were also awarded retroactively back to the 1902 Rose Bowl.

Occasionally, the award has been shared by two players. Four players have been named the Player of the Game of more than one Rose Bowl: Bob Schloredt, Washington (1960, 1961), Charles White, USC (1979, 1980), Ron Dayne, Wisconsin (1999, 2000), and Vince Young, Texas (2005, 2006).

=== Player of the Game awards, 1902, 1916–2004 ===
Game	Player of the Game	Team	Position
1902	Neil Snow	Michigan	FB
1916	Carl Dietz	Washington State	FB
1917	John Beckett	Oregon	T
1918	Hollis Huntington	Mare Island	FB
1919	George Halas	Great Lakes	E
1920	Edward Casey	Harvard	HB
1921	Harold Muller	California	E
1922	Russell Stein	Washington & Jefferson	T
1923	Leo Calland	USC	G
1924	Ira McKee	Navy	QB
1925	Elmer Layden	Notre Dame	FB
1925	Ernie Nevers	Stanford	FB
1926	Johnny Mack Brown	Alabama	HB
1926	George "Wildcat" Wilson	Washington	HB
1927	Fred Pickhard	Alabama	T
1928	Clifford "Biff" Hoffman	Stanford	FB
1929	Benjamin Lom	California	HB
1930	Russ Saunders	USC	QB
1931	John "Monk" Campbell	Alabama	QB
1932	Erny Pinckert	USC	HB
1933	Homer Griffith	USC	QB
1934	Cliff Montgomery	Columbia	QB
1935	Millard "Dixie" Howell	Alabama	HB
1936	James "Monk" Moscrip	Stanford	E
1936	Keith Topping	Stanford	E
1937	Bill Daddio	Pittsburgh	E
1938	Victor Bottari	California	HB
1939	Doyle Nave	USC	QB
1939	Al Krueger	USC	E
1940	Ambrose Schindler	USC	QB
1941	Peter Kmetovic	Stanford	HB
1942	Donald Durdan	Oregon State	HB
1943	Charles Trippi	Georgia	HB
1944	Norman Verry	USC	G
1945	Jim Hardy	USC	QB
1946	Harry Gilmer	Alabama	HB
1947	Claude "Buddy" Young	Illinois	HB
1947	Julius Rykovich	Illinois	HB
1948	Bob Chappuis	Michigan	HB
1949	Frank Aschenbrenner	Northwestern	HB
1950	Fred "Curly" Morrison	Ohio State	FB
1951	Don Dufek	Michigan	FB
1952	William Tate	Illinois	HB
1953	Rudy Bukich	USC	QB
1954	Billy Wells	Michigan State	HB
1955	Dave Leggett	Ohio State	QB
1956	Walter Kowalczyk	Michigan State	HB
1957	Kenneth Ploen	Iowa	QB
1958	Jack Crabtree	Oregon	QB
1959	Bob Jeter	Iowa	HB
1960	Bob Schloredt	Washington	QB
1960	George Fleming	Washington	HB
1961	Bob Schloredt	Washington	QB
1962	Sandy Stephens	Minnesota	QB
1963	Pete Beathard	USC	QB
1963	Ron Vander Kelen	Wisconsin	QB
1964	Jim Grabowski	Illinois	FB
1965	Mel Anthony	Michigan	FB
1966	Bob Stiles	UCLA	DB
1967	John Charles	Purdue	DB
1968	O. J. Simpson	USC	TB
1969	Rex Kern	Ohio State	QB
1970	Bob Chandler	USC	FL
1971	Jim Plunkett	Stanford	QB
1972	Don Bunce	Stanford	QB
1973	Sam Cunningham	USC	FB
1974	Cornelius Greene	Ohio State	QB
1975	Pat Haden	USC	QB
1975	John McKay Jr.	USC	SE
1976	John Sciarra	UCLA	QB
1977	Vince Evans	USC	QB
1978	Warren Moon	Washington	QB
1979	Charles White	USC	TB
1979	Rick Leach	Michigan	QB
1980	Charles White	USC	TB
1981	Butch Woolfolk	Michigan	RB
1982	Jacque Robinson	Washington	RB
1983	Don Rogers	UCLA	FS
1983	Tom Ramsey	UCLA	QB
1984	Rick Neuheisel	UCLA	QB
1985	Tim Green	USC	QB
1985	Jack Del Rio	USC	LB
1986	Eric Ball	UCLA	TB
1987	Jeff Van Raaphorst	Arizona State	QB
1988	Percy Snow	Michigan State	LB
1989	Leroy Hoard	Michigan	FB
1990	Ricky Ervins	USC	TB
1991	Mark Brunell	Washington	QB
1992	Steve Emtman	Washington	DT
1992	Billy Joe Hobert	Washington	QB
1993	Tyrone Wheatley	Michigan	RB
1994	Brent Moss	Wisconsin	RB
1995	Danny O'Neil	Oregon	QB
1995	Ki-Jana Carter	Penn State	RB
1996	Keyshawn Johnson	USC	WR
1997	Joe Germaine	Ohio State	QB
1998	Brian Griese	Michigan	QB
1999	Ron Dayne	Wisconsin	RB
2000	Ron Dayne	Wisconsin	RB
2001	Marques Tuiasosopo	Washington	QB
2002	Ken Dorsey	Miami	QB
2002	Andre Johnson	Miami	WR
2003	Nate Hybl	Oklahoma	QB
2004	Matt Leinart	USC	QB

=== Player of the Game awards, 2005–present ===
Beginning with the 2005 Rose Bowl, Player of the Game awards have been given to both an offensive and defensive player.

Game	PotG — Offense	Team	Position	PotG — Defense	Team	Position
2005	Vince Young	Texas	QB	LaMarr Woodley	Michigan	LB
2006	Vince Young	Texas	QB	Michael Huff	Texas	S
2007	Dwayne Jarrett	USC	WR	Brian Cushing	USC	OLB
2008	John David Booty	USC	QB	Rey Maualuga	USC	LB
2009	Mark Sanchez	USC	QB	Kaluka Maiava	USC	LB
2010	Terrelle Pryor	Ohio State	QB	Kenny Rowe	Oregon	DE
2011	Andy Dalton	TCU	QB	Tank Carder	TCU	LB
2012	Lavasier Tuinei	Oregon	WR	Kiko Alonso	Oregon	LB
2013	Stepfan Taylor	Stanford	RB	Usua Amanam	Stanford	DB
2014	Connor Cook	Michigan State	QB	Kyler Elsworth	Michigan State	LB
2015	Marcus Mariota	Oregon	QB	Tony Washington	Oregon	LB
2016	Christian McCaffrey	Stanford	RB	Aziz Shittu	Stanford	DE
2017	Sam Darnold	USC	QB	Stevie Tu'ikolovatu	USC	DT
2018	Sony Michel	Georgia	RB	Roquan Smith	Georgia	LB
2019	Dwayne Haskins	Ohio State	QB	Brendon White	Ohio State	S
2020	Justin Herbert	Oregon	QB	Brady Breeze	Oregon	S
2021	DeVonta Smith	Alabama	WR	Patrick Surtain II	Alabama	CB
2022	Jaxon Smith-Njigba	Ohio State	WR	Tommy Eichenberg	Ohio State	LB
2023	Sean Clifford	Penn State	QB	Ji'Ayir Brown	Penn State	S
2024	J. J. McCarthy	Michigan	QB	Mason Graham	Michigan	DT
2025	Jeremiah Smith	Ohio State	WR	Cody Simon	Ohio State	LB
2026	Pat Coogan	Indiana	C	D'Angelo Ponds	Indiana	CB

== Game records ==
Team	Performance vs. opponent	Year
Most points scored	59, Oregon vs. Florida State (20)	2015
Most points scored (losing team)	49, Penn State vs. USC (52)	2017
Most points scored (both teams)	102, Georgia (54) vs. Oklahoma (48)	2018
Most points scored in a half	41 (second half), Oregon vs. Florida State	2015
Most points scored in a half (both teams)	56, shared by: (first half), Oregon vs. Wisconsin (first half), Utah vs. Ohio State	2012; 2022
Fewest points allowed	0, Washington vs. Iowa (tied with 17 others)	1982
Largest margin of victory	49, shared by: Michigan (49) vs. Stanford (0); Michigan (49) vs. USC (0)	1902; 1948
First downs	33, USC vs Penn State	2017
Rushing yards	503, Michigan vs. Stanford	1902
Passing yards	573, Ohio State vs. Utah	2022
Total yards	683, Ohio State vs. Utah	2022
Individual	Performance, team vs. opponent	Year
Total offense	583, C. J. Stroud, Ohio State vs Utah	2022
Touchdowns	6, C. J. Stroud, Ohio State vs Utah	2022
Rushing yards	247, Charles White, USC vs. Ohio State (39 attempts, 1 TD)	1980
Rushing TDs	5, Neil Snow, Michigan vs. Stanford	1902
Passing yards	573, C. J. Stroud, Ohio State vs Utah (37-46-1, 6 TD)	2022
Passing TDs	6, C. J. Stroud, Ohio State vs Utah	2022
Receptions	15, Jaxon Smith-Njigba, Ohio State vs Utah	2022
Receiving yards	347, Jaxon Smith-Njigba, Ohio State vs Utah	2022
Receiving TDs	3, Marvin Harrison Jr., Ohio State vs Utah (tied with 3 others)	2022
All-purpose Yards	368, Christian McCaffrey, Stanford vs. Iowa	2016
Tackles	17, John Boyett, Oregon vs. Wisconsin (tied with 1 other)	2012
Sacks	3, Kenny Rowe, Oregon vs. Ohio State (tied with 3 others)	2010
Interceptions	3, Bill Paulman, Stanford vs. SMU (tied with 1 other)	1936
Long plays	Performance, team vs. opponent	Year
Touchdown run	91, De'Anthony Thomas, Oregon vs. Wisconsin	2012
Touchdown pass	88, Sean Clifford to KeAndre Lambert-Smith, Penn State vs. Utah	2023
Kickoff return	103, Al Hoisch, UCLA vs. Illinois (TD)	1947
Punt return	86, Aramis Dandoy, USC vs. Ohio State (TD)	1955
Interception return	78, Elmer Layden, Notre Dame vs. Stanford (TD)	1925
Fumble return	58, Tony Washington, Oregon vs. Florida State (TD)	2015
Punt	73, Don Bracken, Michigan vs. Washington	1981
Field goal	55, Rodrigo Blankenship, Georgia vs. Oklahoma	2018

Note: When there is a tie, the most recent one will be listed.

== Rose Bowl Hall of Fame ==
Inductees (by year)

- 1989 – C.W. "Bump" Elliott, Michigan; W.W. "Woody" Hayes, Ohio State; Howard Jones, USC; Jim Plunkett, Stanford
- 1990 – Archie Griffin, Ohio State; Bob Reynolds, Stanford; Neil Snow, Michigan; Wallace Wade, Brown, Alabama, & Duke; Charles White, USC
- 1991 – Rex Kern, Ohio State; John McKay, USC; Ernie Nevers, Stanford; Roy Riegels, California; Bob Schloredt, Washington; John Sciarra, UCLA; Russell Stein, Washington & Jefferson; Charley Trippi, Georgia; Ron Vander Kelen, Wisconsin; George Wilson, Washington
- 1992 – Frank Albert, Stanford; Bob Chappuis, Michigan; Sam Cunningham, USC; Bill Daddio, Pittsburgh; Bob Griese, Purdue; Hollis Huntington, Oregon & Mare Island Marines; Shy Huntington, Oregon; Elmer Layden, Notre Dame; Jim Owens, Washington
- 1993 – Frank Aschenbrenner, Northwestern; Dixie Howell, Alabama; Don Hutson, Alabama; Curly Morrison, Ohio State; Brick Muller, California; Julius Rykovich, Illinois; Bo Schembechler, Michigan; O. J. Simpson, USC; Bob Stiles, UCLA; Buddy Young, Illinois
- 1994 – Vic Bottari, California; Jim Hardy, USC; Don James, Washington; Bob Jeter, Iowa; Lay Leishman, Tournament of Roses; Pat Richter, Wisconsin; Henry Russell "Red" Sanders, UCLA
- 1995 – Gary Beban, UCLA; Dick Butkus, Illinois; Harry Gilmer, Alabama; Pat Haden, USC; Al Krueger, USC; Doyle Nave, USC; Ted Shipkey, Stanford
- 1996 – Eric Ball, UCLA; Pete Beathard, USC; John Ferraro, USC; Stan Hahn, Tournament of Roses; John Ralston, Stanford; Bill Tate, Illinois
- 1997 – Terry Donahue, UCLA; Jim Grabowski, Illinois; Warren Moon, Washington; Erny Pinckert, USC; Ken Ploen, Iowa; Sandy Stephens, Minnesota
- 1998 – Jack Crabtree, Oregon; Don Durdan, Oregon State; J.K. McKay, USC; Rick Neuheisel, UCLA; Bill Nicholas, Tournament of Roses; Butch Woolfolk, Michigan
- 1999 – Al Hoisch, UCLA; Keith Jackson, ABC Sports; Dave Kaiser, Michigan State
- 2000 – Johnny Mack Brown, Alabama; Marv Goux, USC
- 2001 – No inductees
- 2002 – Ambrose "Amblin' Amby" Schindler, USC; Mel Anthony, Michigan
- 2003 – Harriman Cronk, Tournament of Roses; Danny O'Neil, Oregon; John Robinson, USC
- 2004 – Alan Ameche, Wisconsin; Rudy Bukich, USC; Wayne Duke, Big Ten; Jim Stivers, Tournament of Roses
- 2005 – Richard N. Frank, Lawry's Restaurants (Beef Bowl); Curt Gowdy, Sports Broadcaster
- 2006 – Steve Emtman, Washington; Rube Samuelsen, Sports Journalist; Jeff Van Raaphorst, Arizona State
- 2007 – Pete Johnson, Ohio State; Tom Ramsey, UCLA; Dennis Swanson, Television Executive
- 2008 – Keyshawn Johnson, USC; Virgil "Virg" Lubberden, USC (administrator); Chuck Ortmann, Michigan
- 2009 – Barry Alvarez, Wisconsin; Tom Hansen, Pacific-10 Conference; John Hicks, Ohio State
- 2010 – Brad Budde, USC; Hayden Fry, Iowa; Leroy Keyes, Purdue
- 2011 – Ron Dayne, Wisconsin; Dick Enberg, NBC; George Fleming, Washington
- 2012 – John Cooper, Arizona State and Ohio State; Brian Griese, Michigan; and Ron Yary, USC
- 2013 – Lloyd Carr, Michigan; Orlando Pace, Ohio State; Lynn Swann, USC
- 2014 – Knute Rockne, Notre Dame; Dick Vermeil, UCLA and Ki-Jana Carter, Penn State
- 2015 – Mark Brunell, Washington; Jim Muldoon (Pac-10); Fritz Pollard, Brown; and Tyrone Wheatley, Michigan
- 2016 – Bobby Bell, Minnesota; Ricky Ervins, USC; Tommy Prothro, UCLA and Art Spander, UCLA
- 2017 – Mack Brown, Texas; Cade McNown, UCLA; Charles Woodson, Michigan; and Dr. Charles West, Washington & Jefferson
- 2018 – George Halas, Great Lakes Navy; Randall McDaniel, Arizona State; Pop Warner, Stanford; Vince Young, Texas
- 2019 – Eddie Casey, Harvard; Cornelius Greene, Ohio State; Matt Leinart, USC; Jacque Robinson, University of Washington
- 2020 – None
- 2021 – Anthony Davis, USC; Jim Delany, Big Ten Conference; Ron Simpkins, Michigan
- 2022 – Hugo Bezdek, Oregon and Penn State; Darryl Dunn, Rose Bowl Stadium; Vince Evans, USC; Lorenzo White, Michigan State
- 2023 – Cliff Montgomery, Columbia; Kirk Herbstreit, ESPN and Ohio State; Lincoln Kennedy, Washington.
- 2024 – Reggie Bush, USC; Mark Dantonio, Michigan State; LaMichael James, Oregon
- 2025 – Montee Ball, (Wisconsin) and Bob Stoops (Oklahoma)
- 2026 – Don Bunce, Bob Chandler, Les Richter and Frank Sinkwich

== All-Century Class ==
The Rose Bowl Game All-Century Class was announced on December 28, 2013.

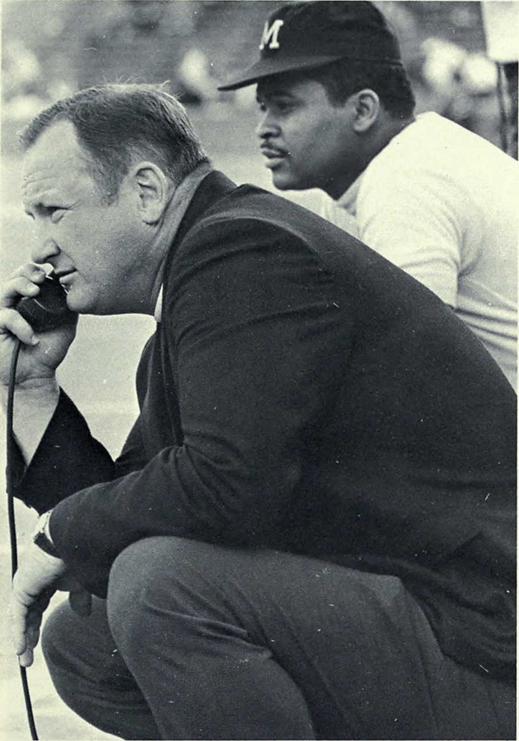
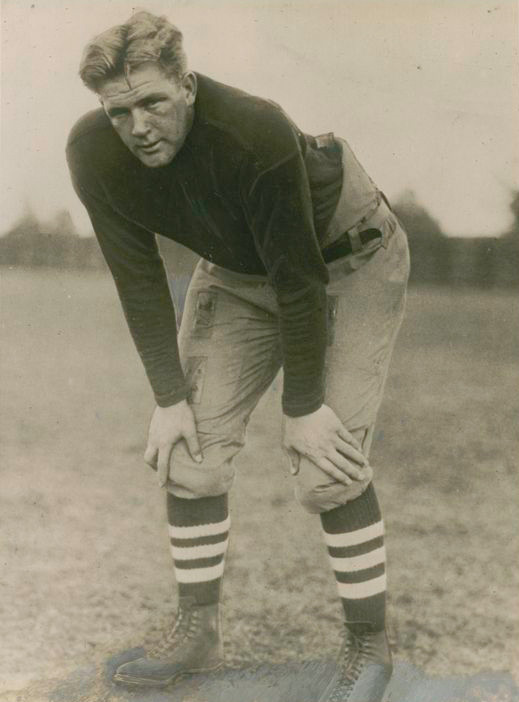
Bo Schembechler (left) and Ernie Nevers

They are:

- 1900s–1910s: George Halas (Great Lakes Navy)
- 1920s: Ernie Nevers (Stanford)
- 1930s: Don Hutson (Alabama) and Howard Jones (USC)
- 1940s: Charley Trippi (Georgia)
- 1950s: Woody Hayes (Ohio State)
- 1960s: John McKay (USC)
- 1970s: Archie Griffin (Ohio State)
- 1980s: Bo Schembechler (Michigan)
- 1990s: Ron Dayne (Wisconsin)
- 2000s: Vince Young (Texas)
- 2010s: Montee Ball (Wisconsin)

In addition to being named as All-Century representatives for their respective decades, John McKay and Archie Griffin were named the 100th Rose Bowl Game All-Century Coach and Player respectively.

The finalists:

- 1900–1919: Paddy Driscoll (Great Lakes Navy, 1919), Neil Snow (Michigan, 1902) and George Halas (Great Lakes Navy, 1919)
- 1920–1929: Ernie Nevers (Stanford, 1925), Elmer Layden (Notre Dame, 1925) and Johnny Mack Brown (Alabama, 1926)
- 1930–1939: Millard "Dixie" Howell (Alabama, 1935), Don Hutson (Alabama, 1935) and Howard Jones (USC, 1930, 1932–33, 1939–40)
- 1940–1949: Bob Chappuis (Michigan, 1948), Harry Gilmer (Alabama, 1946) and Charley Trippi (Georgia, 1943)
- 1950–1959: Alan Ameche (Wisconsin, 1953), Bob Jeter (Iowa, 1959) and Woody Hayes (Ohio State, 1954, 1957, 1968, 1970, 1972–1975)
- 1960–1969: Ron Vander Kelen (Wisconsin, 1963), O. J. Simpson (USC, 1968–69) and John McKay (USC, 1963, 1967–70, 1973–1975)
- 1970–1979: Jim Plunkett (Stanford, 1971), Charles White (USC, 1979–1980) and Archie Griffin (Ohio State, 1973–1976)
- 1980–1989: Don James (Washington, 1978, 1981–82, 1991–93), John Robinson (USC, 1977, 1979–80, 1996) and Bo Schembechler (Michigan, 1970, 1972, 1977–79, 1981, 1983, 1987, 1989–90)
- 1990–1999: Barry Alvarez (Wisconsin, 1994, 1999, 2000 and 2013), Keyshawn Johnson (USC, 1996) and Ron Dayne (Wisconsin, 1999 and 2000)
- 2000–2009: Matt Leinart (USC, 2004 and 2006), Vince Young (Texas, 2005–06) and Brian Cushing (USC, 2006–09)
- 2010–2012: Terrelle Pryor (Ohio State, 2010), Tank Carder (TCU, 2011) and Montee Ball (Wisconsin, 2011–13)

== Notes ==
=== Books ===
- America's New Year Celebration. The Rose Parade & Rose Bowl Game. Albion Publishing Group, Santa Barbara, California. 1999.
- Samuelsen, Rube. The Rose Bowl Game. Doubleday Company and Inc. 1951.
- Big Ten Conference football media guide. (PDF copy available at http://bigten.cstv.com.)
- Pacific-10 Conference football media guide. (PDF copy available at http://www.pac-10.org.)
- Malcolm, Moran, and Keith Jackson (foreword). The Rose Bowl: 100th: The History of the Granddaddy of Them All. Whitman Publishing, LLC, January 6, 2013. ISBN 9780794837938.

== See also ==
- Great Rose Bowl Hoax
- List of college bowl games

== Bibliography ==
- Gruver, Edward (2002), Nitschke. Lanham:Taylor Trade Publishing. ISBN 1-58979-127-4
