= List of Washington State Cougars bowl games =

The Washington State Cougars college football team competes as part of the NCAA Division I Football Bowl Subdivision (FBS), representing Washington State University in the Pac-12 Conference. Since the establishment of the team in 1888, Washington State has appeared in 21 bowl games. Included in these games are four appearances in the Rose Bowl Game and one Bowl Championship Series (BCS) game appearances, in the 2003 Rose Bowl.

== Key ==
General
†	Bowl game record attendance
‡	Former bowl game record attendance

Results
W	Win
L	Loss

== Bowl games ==
List of bowl games showing bowl played in, score, date, season, opponent, stadium, location, attendance and head coach (Note: Statistics correct as of 2015–16 NCAA football bowl games.)
#	Bowl	Score (Note: Results are sortable first by whether the result was a Washington State win, loss or tie and then second by the margin of victory.)	Date	Season (Note: Links to the season article for the Washington State team that competed in the bowl for that year.)	Opponent (Note: Links to the season article for the opponent that Washington State competed against in the bowl for that year when available or to their general page when unavailable.)	Stadium	Location	Attendance	Head coach
1	Rose Bowl	W 14–0	January 1, 1916	1915	Brown Bears	Tournament Park	Pasadena	7,000	William Henry Dietz
2	Rose Bowl	L 24–0	January 1, 1931	1930	Alabama Crimson Tide	Rose Bowl	Pasadena	60,000	Babe Hollingbery
3	Evergreen Bowl	L 7-0	December 6, 1941	1941	Texas A & M Aggies	Stadium High School	Tacoma	30,000	Babe Hollingbery
4	Holiday Bowl	L 38–36	December 30, 1981	1981	BYU Cougars	Jack Murphy Stadium (Note: Originally called Jack Murphy Stadium from 1980 to 1997, in 1998 it was renamed Qualcomm Stadium.)	San Diego	52,419	Jim Walden
5	Aloha Bowl	W 24–22	December 25, 1988	1988	Houston Cougars	Aloha Stadium	Honolulu	35,132	Dennis Erickson
6	Copper Bowl	W 31–28	December 29, 1992	1992	Utah Utes	Arizona Stadium	Tucson	40,876^{‡}	Mike Price
7	Alamo Bowl	W 10–3	December 31, 1994	1994	Baylor Bears	Alamodome	San Antonio	44,106	Mike Price
8	Rose Bowl	L 21–16	January 1, 1998	1997	Michigan Wolverines	Rose Bowl	Pasadena	100,635	Mike Price
9	Sun Bowl	W 33–27	December 31, 2001	2001	Purdue Boilermakers	Sun Bowl	El Paso	47,812	Mike Price
10	Rose Bowl	L 34–14	January 1, 2003	2002	Oklahoma Sooners	Rose Bowl	Pasadena	86,848	Mike Price
11	Holiday Bowl	W 28–20	December 30, 2003	2003	Texas Longhorns	Qualcomm Stadium	San Diego	61,102	Bill Doba
12	New Mexico Bowl	L 48–45	December 21, 2013	2013	Colorado State Rams	University Stadium	Albuquerque	27,104	Mike Leach
13	Sun Bowl	W 20–14	December 26, 2015	2015	Miami Hurricanes	Sun Bowl Stadium	El Paso	41,180	Mike Leach
14	Holiday Bowl	L 17–12	December 27, 2016	2016	Minnesota Golden Gophers	Qualcomm Stadium	San Diego	48,704	Mike Leach
15	Holiday Bowl	L 42–17	December 28, 2017	2017	Michigan State Spartans	SDCCU Stadium	San Diego	47,092	Mike Leach
16	Alamo Bowl	W 28–26	December 28, 2018	2018	Iowa State Cyclones	Alamodome	San Antonio	60,675	Mike Leach
17	Cheez-It Bowl	L 21–31	December 27, 2019	2019	Air Force Falcons	Chase Field	Phoenix	34,105	Mike Leach
18	Sun Bowl	L 21–24	December 31, 2021	2021	Central Michigan Chippewas	Sun Bowl Stadium	El Paso	34,540	Jake Dickert
19	LA Bowl	L 6–29	December 17, 2022	2022	Fresno State Bulldogs	SoFi Stadium	Inglewood	32,405	Jake Dickert
20	Holiday Bowl	L 35–52	December 27, 2024	2024	Syracuse Orange	Snapdragon Stadium	San Diego	23,920	Pete Kaligis
21	Famous Idaho Potato Bowl	W 34–21	December 22, 2025	2025	Utah State Aggies	Albertsons Stadium	Boise	17,031	Jesse Bobbit
