= List of Texas Longhorns bowl games =

The Texas Longhorns football team competes as part of the NCAA Division I Football Bowl Subdivision (FBS), representing the University of Texas in the Southeastern Conference. Since the establishment of the team in 1893, Texas has appeared in 63 bowl games with a record of 34–27–2. Included in these games are two BCS National Championship Game appearances. Texas has also participated in 22 Cotton Bowls, two Rose Bowls, five Sugar Bowls, two Orange Bowls, two Fiesta Bowls, and one Peach Bowl. In 2025, Texas became the first team to win all 6 of the New Year's Six bowls.

== Key ==
General
†	Bowl game record attendance
‡	Former bowl game record attendance
*	Denotes national championship game
§	Denotes College Football Playoff game

Results
W	Win
L	Loss
T	Tie

== Bowl games ==
#	Bowl	Score	Date	Season	Opponent	Stadium	Location	Attendance	Head coach
1	Cotton Bowl	W 14–7	January 1, 1943	1942	Georgia Tech Yellow Jackets	Cotton Bowl	Dallas, TX	36,620	Dana X. Bible
2	Cotton Bowl	T 7–7	January 1, 1944	1943	Randolph Field Ramblers	Cotton Bowl	Dallas, TX	15,000	Dana X. Bible
3	Cotton Bowl	W 40–27	January 1, 1946	1945	Missouri Tigers	Cotton Bowl	Dallas, TX	46,000	Dana X. Bible
4	Sugar Bowl	W 27–7	January 1, 1948	1947	Alabama Crimson Tide	Tulane Stadium	New Orleans, LA	73,000	Blair Cherry
5	Orange Bowl	W 41–28	January 1, 1949	1948	Georgia Bulldogs	Burdine Stadium	Miami, FL	60,523	Blair Cherry
6	Cotton Bowl	L 14–20	January 1, 1951	1950	Tennessee Volunteers	Cotton Bowl	Dallas, TX	75,500	Blair Cherry
7	Cotton Bowl	W 16–0	January 1, 1953	1952	Tennessee Volunteers	Cotton Bowl	Dallas, TX	75,500	Ed Price
8	Sugar Bowl	L 7–39	January 1, 1958	1957	Ole Miss Rebels	Tulane Stadium	New Orleans, LA	N/A	Darrell Royal
9	Cotton Bowl	L 14–23	January 1, 1960	1959	Syracuse Orange	Cotton Bowl	Dallas, TX	75,504	Darrell Royal
10	Bluebonnet Bowl	T 3–3	December 17, 1960	1960	Alabama Crimson Tide	Rice Stadium	Houston, TX	68,000	Darrell Royal
11	Cotton Bowl	W 12–7	January 1, 1962	1961	Ole Miss Rebels	Cotton Bowl	Dallas, TX	75,504	Darrell Royal
12	Cotton Bowl	L 0–13	January 1, 1963	1962	LSU Tigers	Cotton Bowl	Dallas, TX	75,504	Darrell Royal
13	Cotton Bowl*	W 28–6	January 1, 1964	1963	Navy Midshipmen	Cotton Bowl	Dallas, TX	75,504	Darrell Royal
14	Orange Bowl	W 21–17	January 1, 1965	1964	Alabama Crimson Tide	Orange Bowl	Miami, FL	72,880	Darrell Royal
15	Bluebonnet Bowl	W 19–0	December 17, 1966	1966	Ole Miss Rebels	Rice Stadium	Houston, TX	67,000	Darrell Royal
16	Cotton Bowl	W 36–13	January 1, 1969	1968	Tennessee Volunteers	Cotton Bowl	Dallas, TX	70,000	Darrell Royal
17	Cotton Bowl*	W 21–17	January 1, 1970	1969	Notre Dame Fighting Irish	Cotton Bowl	Dallas, TX	71,938	Darrell Royal
18	Cotton Bowl*	L 11–24	January 1, 1971	1970	Notre Dame Fighting Irish	Cotton Bowl	Dallas, TX	72,000	Darrell Royal
19	Cotton Bowl	L 6–30	January 1, 1972	1971	Penn State Nittany Lions	Cotton Bowl	Dallas, TX	70,000	Darrell Royal
20	Cotton Bowl	W 17–13	January 1, 1973	1972	Alabama Crimson Tide	Cotton Bowl	Dallas, TX	72,000	Darrell Royal
21	Cotton Bowl	L 3–19	January 1, 1974	1973	Nebraska Cornhuskers	Cotton Bowl	Dallas, TX	68,500	Darrell Royal
22	Gator Bowl	L 3–27	December 30, 1974	1974	Auburn Tigers	Gator Bowl Stadium	Jacksonville, FL	63,811	Darrell Royal
23	Astro-Bluebonnet Bowl	W 38–21	December 27, 1975	1975	Colorado Buffaloes	Astrodome	Houston, TX	52,748	Darrell Royal
24	Cotton Bowl	L 10–38	January 2, 1978	1977	Notre Dame Fighting Irish	Cotton Bowl	Dallas, TX	76,701	Fred Akers
25	Sun Bowl	W 42–0	December 23, 1978	1978	Maryland Terrapins	Sun Bowl	El Paso, TX	32,000	Fred Akers
26	Sun Bowl	L 7–14	December 22, 1979	1979	Washington Huskies	Sun Bowl	El Paso, TX	33,412	Fred Akers
27	Astro-Bluebonnet Bowl	L 7–16	December 31, 1980	1980	North Carolina Tar Heels	Astrodome	Houston, TX	36,667	Fred Akers
28	Cotton Bowl	W 14–12	January 1, 1982	1981	Alabama Crimson Tide	Cotton Bowl	Dallas, TX	73,243	Fred Akers
29	Sun Bowl	L 10–26	December 25, 1982	1982	North Carolina Tar Heels	Sun Bowl	El Paso, TX	31,359	Fred Akers
30	Cotton Bowl	L 9–10	January 2, 1984	1983	Georgia Bulldogs	Cotton Bowl	Dallas, TX	67,891	Fred Akers
31	Freedom Bowl	L 17–55	December 26, 1984	1984	Iowa Hawkeyes	Anaheim Stadium	Anaheim, CA	24,093	Fred Akers
32	Bluebonnet Bowl	L 16–24	December 31, 1985	1985	Air Force Falcons	Rice Stadium	Houston, TX	42,000	Fred Akers
33	Bluebonnet Bowl	W 32–27	December 31, 1987	1987	Pittsburgh Panthers	Astrodome	Houston, TX	33,122	David McWilliams
34	Cotton Bowl	L 3–46	January 1, 1991	1990	Miami Hurricanes	Cotton Bowl	Dallas, TX	73,521	David McWilliams
35	Sun Bowl	W 35–31	December 29, 1994	1994	North Carolina Tar Heels	Sun Bowl	El Paso, TX	50,612	John Mackovic
36	Sugar Bowl	L 10–28	December 31, 1995	1995	Virginia Tech Hokies	Louisiana Superdome	New Orleans, LA	70,283	John Mackovic
37	Fiesta Bowl	L 15–38	January 1, 1997	1996	Penn State Nittany Lions	Sun Devil Stadium	Tempe, AZ	65,106	John Mackovic
38	Cotton Bowl	W 38–11	January 1, 1999	1998	Mississippi State Bulldogs	Cotton Bowl	Dallas, TX	72,611	Mack Brown
39	Cotton Bowl	L 6–27	January 1, 2000	1999	Arkansas Razorbacks	Cotton Bowl	Dallas, TX	72,723	Mack Brown
40	Holiday Bowl	L 30–35	December 29, 2000	2000	Oregon Ducks	Qualcomm Stadium	San Diego, CA	63,278	Mack Brown
41	Holiday Bowl	W 47–43	December 28, 2001	2001	Washington Huskies	Qualcomm Stadium	San Diego, CA	60,548	Mack Brown
42	Cotton Bowl	W 35–20	January 1, 2003	2002	LSU Tigers	Cotton Bowl	Dallas, TX	N/A	Mack Brown
43	Holiday Bowl	L 20–28	December 30, 2003	2003	Washington State	Qualcomm Stadium	San Diego, CA	61,102	Mack Brown
44	Rose Bowl	W 38–37	January 1, 2005	2004	Michigan	Rose Bowl	Pasadena, CA	93,467	Mack Brown
45	Rose Bowl*	W 41–38	January 4, 2006	2005	USC	Rose Bowl	Pasadena, CA	93,988	Mack Brown
46	Alamo Bowl	W 26–24	December 30, 2006	2006	Iowa	Alamodome	San Antonio, TX	65,875	Mack Brown
47	Holiday Bowl	W 52–34	December 27, 2007	2007	Arizona State	Qualcomm Stadium	San Diego, CA	64,020	Mack Brown
48	Fiesta Bowl	W 24–21	January 5, 2009	2008	Ohio State	University of Phoenix Stadium	Glendale, AZ	72,047	Mack Brown
49	BCS National Championship Game*	L 21–37	January 7, 2010	2009	Alabama	Rose Bowl	Pasadena, CA	94,906	Mack Brown
50	Holiday Bowl	W 21–10	December 28, 2011	2011	California	Qualcomm Stadium	San Diego, CA	56,313	Mack Brown
51	Alamo Bowl	W 31–27	December 29, 2012	2012	Oregon State	Alamodome	San Antonio, TX	65,277	Mack Brown
52	Alamo Bowl	L 7–30	December 30, 2013	2013	Oregon	Alamodome	San Antonio, TX	65,918	Mack Brown
53	Texas Bowl	L 7–31	December 29, 2014	2014	Arkansas	NRG Stadium	Houston, TX	71,115	Charlie Strong
54	Texas Bowl	W 33–16	December 27, 2017	2017	Missouri	NRG Stadium	Houston, TX	67,820	Tom Herman
55	Sugar Bowl	W 28–21	January 1, 2019	2018	Georgia	Mercedes-Benz Superdome	New Orleans, LA	71,449	Tom Herman
56	Alamo Bowl	W 38–10	December 31, 2019	2019	Utah	Alamodome	San Antonio, TX	60,147	Tom Herman
57	Alamo Bowl	W 55–23	December 29, 2020	2020	Colorado	Alamodome	San Antonio, TX	10,822	Tom Herman
58	Alamo Bowl	L 20–27	December 29, 2022	2022	Washington	Alamodome	San Antonio, TX	62,730	Steve Sarkisian
59	Sugar Bowl§	L 31–37	January 1, 2024	2023	Washington	Caesars Superdome	New Orleans, LA	68,791	Steve Sarkisian
60	CFP (First Round)§	W 38–24	December 21, 2024	2024	Clemson	Darrell K Royal–Texas Memorial Stadium	Austin, TX	101,150	Steve Sarkisian
61	Peach Bowl§	W 39–31	January 1, 2025	2024	Arizona State	Mercedes-Benz Stadium	Atlanta, GA	71,105	Steve Sarkisian
62	Cotton Bowl§	L 14–28	January 10, 2025	2024	Ohio State	AT&T Stadium	Arlington, TX	74,527	Steve Sarkisian
63	Citrus Bowl	W 41–27	December 31, 2025	2025	Michigan	Camping World Stadium	Orlando, FL	47,316	Steve Sarkisian
