= List of Penn State Nittany Lions bowl games =

The Penn State Nittany Lions football have competed in 56 bowl games compiling a record of 33–21–2 (.607). The Nittany Lions hold a 18–8–1 (.685) record in the major bowls (Rose, Orange, Sugar, Fiesta, Peach, and Cotton).

Coach Joe Paterno was responsible for most of these bids and victories, compiling more wins, 24, and appearances, 37, than any other coach in college football history, with a bowl record of 24–12–1 (.662). Paterno also had a record of 13–4–0 (.765) in "major" bowls. Paterno is one of only two coaches in history to have competed in and won all five major bowls with the other being Bob Stoops at Oklahoma.

== Key ==
Results
W	Win
L	Loss
T	Tie

== Bowl games ==
List of bowl games showing bowl played in, score, date, season, opponent, stadium, location, attendance and head coach (Note: Statistics correct as of 2022–23 NCAA football bowl games.)
#	Bowl	Score (Note: Results are sortable first by whether the result was a Penn State win, loss or tie and then second by the margin of victory.)	Date	Season (Note: Links to the season article for the Penn State team that competed in the bowl for that year.)	Opponent (Note: Links to the season article for the opponent that Penn State competed against in the bowl for that year when available or to their general page when unavailable.)	Stadium	Location	Attendance	Head coach
1	Rose Bowl	L 14–3	January 1, 1923	1922	USC Trojans	Rose Bowl	Pasadena	43,000	Hugo Bezdek
2	Cotton Bowl Classic	T 13–13	January 1, 1948	1947	SMU Mustangs	Cotton Bowl	Dallas	47,000	Bob Higgins
3	Liberty Bowl	W 7–0	December 19, 1959	1959	Alabama Crimson Tide	Philadelphia Municipal Stadium	Philadelphia	36,211	Rip Engle
4	Liberty Bowl	W 41–12	December 20, 1960	1960	Oregon Ducks	Philadelphia Municipal Stadium	Philadelphia	16,624	Rip Engle
5	Gator Bowl	W 30–15	December 30, 1961	1961	Georgia Tech Yellowjackets	Gator Bowl Stadium	Jacksonville	50,202	Rip Engle
6	Gator Bowl	L 17–7	December 29, 1962	1962	Florida Gators	Gator Bowl Stadium	Jacksonville	50,026	Rip Engle
7	Gator Bowl	T 17–17	December 30, 1967	1967	Florida State Seminoles	Gator Bowl Stadium	Jacksonville	68,019	Joe Paterno
8	Orange Bowl	W 15–14	January 1, 1969	1968	Kansas Jayhawks	Orange Bowl	Miami	77,719	Joe Paterno
9	Orange Bowl	W 10–3	January 1, 1970	1969	Missouri Tigers	Orange Bowl	Miami	77,282	Joe Paterno
10	Cotton Bowl Classic	W 30–6	January 1, 1972	1971	Texas Longhorns	Cotton Bowl	Dallas	70,000	Joe Paterno
11	Sugar Bowl	L 14–0	December 31, 1972	1972	Oklahoma Sooners	Tulane Stadium	New Orleans	80,123	Joe Paterno
12	Orange Bowl	W 16–9	January 1, 1974	1973	LSU Tigers	Orange Bowl	Miami	60,477	Joe Paterno
13	Cotton Bowl Classic	W 41–20	January 1, 1975	1974	Baylor Bears	Cotton Bowl	Dallas	68,500	Joe Paterno
14	Sugar Bowl	L 13–6	December 31, 1975	1975	Alabama Crimson Tide	Louisiana Superdome	New Orleans	75,212	Joe Paterno
15	Gator Bowl	L 20–9	December 27, 1976	1976	Notre Dame Fighting Irish	Gator Bowl Stadium	Jacksonville	67,827	Joe Paterno
16	Fiesta Bowl	W 42–30	December 25, 1977	1977	Arizona State Sun Devils	Sun Devil Stadium	Tempe	57,727	Joe Paterno
17	Sugar Bowl	L 14–7	January 1, 1979	1978	Alabama Crimson Tide	Louisiana Superdome	New Orleans	76,824	Joe Paterno
18	Liberty Bowl	W 9–6	December 22, 1979	1979	Tulane Green Wave	Liberty Bowl	Memphis	50,021	Joe Paterno
19	Fiesta Bowl	W 31–19	December 26, 1980	1980	Ohio State Buckeyes	Sun Devil Stadium	Tempe	66,738	Joe Paterno
20	Fiesta Bowl	W 26–10	January 1, 1982	1981	USC Trojans	Sun Devil Stadium	Tempe	71,053	Joe Paterno
21	Sugar Bowl	W 27–23	January 1, 1983	1982	Georgia Bulldogs	Louisiana Superdome	New Orleans	78,127	Joe Paterno
22	Aloha Bowl	W 13–10	December 26, 1983	1983	Washington Huskies	Aloha Stadium	Honolulu	37,212	Joe Paterno
23	Orange Bowl	L 25–10	January 1, 1986	1985	Oklahoma Sooners	Orange Bowl	Miami	74,178	Joe Paterno
24	Fiesta Bowl	W 14–10	January 2, 1987	1986	Miami Hurricanes	Sun Devil Stadium	Tempe	73,098	Joe Paterno
25	Florida Citrus Bowl	L 35–10	January 1, 1988	1987	Clemson Tigers	Florida Citrus Bowl	Orlando	53,152	Joe Paterno
26	Holiday Bowl	W 50–39	December 30, 1989	1989	BYU Cougars	Jack Murphy Stadium	San Diego	61,113	Joe Paterno
27	Blockbuster Bowl	L 24–17	December 28, 1990	1990	Florida State Seminoles	Joe Robbie Stadium	Miami Gardens	74,021	Joe Paterno
28	Fiesta Bowl	W 42–17	January 1, 1992	1991	Tennessee Volunteers	Sun Devil Stadium	Tempe	71,133	Joe Paterno
29	Blockbuster Bowl	L 24–3	January 1, 1993	1992	Stanford Cardinal	Joe Robbie Stadium	Miami Gardens	45,554	Joe Paterno
30	Florida Citrus Bowl	W 31–13	January 1, 1994	1993	Tennessee Volunteers	Florida Citrus Bowl	Orlando	72,456	Joe Paterno
31	Rose Bowl	W 38–20	January 2, 1995	1994	Oregon Ducks	Rose Bowl	Pasadena	102,247	Joe Paterno
32	Outback Bowl	W 43–14	January 1, 1996	1995	Auburn Tigers	Tampa Stadium	Tampa	65,313	Joe Paterno
33	Fiesta Bowl	W 38–15	January 1, 1997	1996	Texas Longhorns	Sun Devil Stadium	Tempe	65,106	Joe Paterno
34	Florida Citrus Bowl	L 21–6	January 1, 1998	1997	Florida Gators	Florida Citrus Bowl	Orlando	72,940	Joe Paterno
35	Outback Bowl	W 26–14	January 1, 1999	1998	Kentucky Wildcats	Raymond James Stadium	Tampa	66,005	Joe Paterno
36	Alamo Bowl	W 24–0	December 28, 1999	1999	Texas A&M Aggies	Alamodome	San Antonio	65,380	Joe Paterno
37	Capital One Bowl	L 13–9	January 1, 2003	2002	Auburn Tigers	Florida Citrus Bowl	Orlando	66,334	Joe Paterno
38	Orange Bowl	W 26–23 3OT	January 3, 2006	2005	Florida State Seminoles	Dolphins Stadium	Miami Gardens	77,912	Joe Paterno
39	Outback Bowl	W 20–10	January 1, 2007	2006	Tennessee Volunteers	Raymond James Stadium	Tampa	65,601	Joe Paterno
40	Alamo Bowl	W 24–17	December 28, 2007	2007	Texas A&M Aggies	Alamodome	San Antonio	66,166	Joe Paterno
41	Rose Bowl	L 38–24	January 1, 2009	2008	USC Trojans	Rose Bowl	Pasadena	93,293	Joe Paterno
42	Capital One Bowl	W 19–17	January 1, 2010	2009	LSU Tigers	Florida Citrus Bowl	Orlando	63,025	Joe Paterno
43	Outback Bowl	L 37–24	January 1, 2011	2010	Florida Gators	Raymond James Stadium	Tampa	60,574	Joe Paterno
44	TicketCity Bowl	L 30–14	January 2, 2012	2011	Houston Cougars	Cotton Bowl	Dallas	46,817	Tom Bradley (interim)
45	Pinstripe Bowl	W 31–30 OT	December 27, 2014	2014	Boston College Eagles	Yankee Stadium	Bronx	49,012	James Franklin
46	TaxSlayer Bowl	L 24–17	January 2, 2016	2015	Georgia Bulldogs	EverBank Field	Jacksonville	58,212	James Franklin
47	Rose Bowl	L 49–52	January 2, 2017	2016	USC Trojans	Rose Bowl	Pasadena	95,128	James Franklin
48	Fiesta Bowl	W 35–28	December 30, 2017	2017	Washington Huskies	University of Phoenix Stadium	Glendale	61,842	James Franklin
49	Citrus Bowl	L 24–27	January 1, 2019	2018	Kentucky Wildcats	Camping World Stadium	Orlando	59,167	James Franklin
50	Cotton Bowl Classic	W 53–39	December 28, 2019	2019	Memphis Tigers	AT&T Stadium	Arlington	54,828	James Franklin
51	Outback Bowl	L 10–24	January 1, 2022	2021	Arkansas Razorbacks	Raymond James Stadium	Tampa	46,577	James Franklin
52	Rose Bowl	W 35–21	January 2, 2023	2022	Utah Utes	Rose Bowl	Pasadena	94,873	James Franklin
53	Peach Bowl	L 25–38	December 30, 2023	2023	Ole Miss Rebels	Mercedes-Benz Stadium	Atlanta	71,230	James Franklin
54	Fiesta Bowl	W 31–14	December 31, 2024	2024	Boise State Broncos	State Farm Stadium	Glendale	63,854	James Franklin
55	Orange Bowl	L 24–27	January 9, 2025	2024	Notre Dame Fighting Irish	Hard Rock Stadium	Miami Gardens	66,881	James Franklin
56	Pinstripe Bowl	W 22–10	December 27, 2025	2025	Clemson Tigers	Yankee Stadium	Bronx	41,101	Terry Smith (interim)
