= Nate Hybl =

American football player (born 1979)

No. 18
- Position: Quarterback

Personal information
- Born: June 19, 1979 (age 47); Hazlehurst, Georgia, U.S.
- Listed height: 6 ft 4 in (1.93 m)
- Listed weight: 222 lb (101 kg)

Career information
- College: Georgia; Oklahoma
- NFL draft: 2003: undrafted

Career history
- Cleveland Browns (2003–2004); → Scottish Claymores (2004); Jacksonville Jaguars (2005)*
- * Offseason or practice squad member only

Awards and highlights
- BCS national champion (2000)

Nate Hybl (born June 19, 1979) is an American former professional football player who was a quarterback in the National Football League (NFL). He played college football for the Oklahoma Sooners as their starting quarterback in 2001 and 2002. He subsequently spent time in the NFL with the Cleveland Browns and Jacksonville Jaguars. During his time with the Browns, he was allocated for development in NFL Europe. Hybl is the founder of gusto! in Atlanta.

== Early life ==
Nathan Thomas Hybl was born on June 19, 1979, in Hazlehurst, Georgia. He attended Jeff Davis High School in Hazlehurst, Georgia and was a standout in football and golf.

== College career ==
Hybl began his college career at Georgia and red-shirted as a freshman in 1998. After the 1998 season he transferred to Oklahoma, and sat out for the 1999 season. Hybl started for the Oklahoma Sooners in 2001 and 2002. During his career he won a Big 12 Conference championship and was 2–0 in bowl games as a starter. He was the MVP of the 2003 Rose Bowl.

== Professional career ==
After going undrafted in the 2003 NFL draft, Hybl signed with the Cleveland Browns on May 2, 2003. He was released on August 25, signed to the practice squad on September 1, and promoted to the active roster on September 27, 2003. However, Hybl did not play in any games during the 2003 season. On March 3, 2004, he was allocated to NFL Europe to play for the Scottish Claymores. He played in nine games, starting seven, for the Claymores during the 2004 NFL Europe season, completing 76 of 131 passes (58.0%) for 654 yards, two touchdowns, and three interceptions. Hybl was released by the Browns on August 30, 2004, but later signed to the practice squad on November 30, 2004. He was released again on December 14, 2004.

Hybl signed with the Jacksonville Jaguars on March 4, 2005. He was released on August 27, and later signed to the practice squad on November 29, 2005. He became a free agent after the 2005 season.
