= 2003 Rose Bowl =

American college football game

2003 Rose Bowl presented by PlayStation 2
- 89th Rose Bowl Game
Oklahoma Sooners	Washington State Cougars
(11–2)	(10–2)
Big 12	Pac-10
34	14
Head coach: Bob Stoops	Head coach: Mike Price
AP / Coaches / BCS; 8 / 8 / 7	AP / Coaches / BCS; 7 / 7 / 6
	1	2	3	4	Total
Oklahoma	3	14	3	14	34
Washington State	0	0	0	14	14
- Date: January 1, 2003
- Season: 2002
- Stadium: Rose Bowl
- Location: Pasadena, California
- MVP: Nate Hybl – QB, Oklahoma
- Favorite: Oklahoma by 6
- National anthem: Washington State University Cougar Marching Band
- Referee: Steve Shaw (SEC)
- Halftime show: Pride of Oklahoma Marching Band; Washington State University Cougar Marching Band
- Attendance: 86,848
- Payout: US$11-13 million

United States TV coverage
- Network: ABC
- Announcers: Brent Musburger (play-by-play); Gary Danielson (analyst); Jack Arute (sideline)

The 2003 Rose Bowl was a college football bowl game played on January 1, 2003. It was the 89th Rose Bowl game. It was a match-up between the Oklahoma Sooners and the Washington State Cougars. Oklahoma led 27–0 in the fourth quarter and won, 34–14. Sooner quarterback Nate Hybl was named the Player Of The Game.

== Pre-Game Activities ==
The Pasadena Tournament of Roses chooses their co-Grand Marshals of the 114th annual Rose Parade, they are: Actor/Comedian Bill Cosby, Art Linkletter and Fred Rogers from Mister Rogers' Neighborhood on PBS.

On Tuesday, October 22, 2002 - Tournament of Roses President Gary L. Thomas selects 17-year-old Alexandra Wucetich, a senior at San Marino High School & a resident of San Marino, California to become the 85th Rose Queen to reign over the 114th Tournament of Roses Parade and the 89th Rose Bowl Game.

Members of the court are: Princesses Anjali Agrawal, Arcadia, La Salle High School; Heather Bell, Pasadena, John Muir High School; Katherine Berber, San Marino, Flintridge Sacred Heart Academy; Glynn Joseph, Altadena, Flintridge Sacred Heart Academy; Megan Maclennan, Pasadena, Polytechnic School; and Danielle Yamamoto, La Canada Flintridge, La Canada High School.

== Teams ==
Prior to the BCS, this pairing never would have occurred. Oklahoma came into the game Big 12 Champions, while Washington State came in co-champions of the Pac-10. The Rose Bowl normally features the champions of the Big Ten and the Pac-10. However, because the Big Ten co-champion, the Ohio State Buckeyes, had finished second in the BCS, they were set to play in the Fiesta Bowl for the national championship against the Miami Hurricanes. Earlier in the season, Ohio State had defeated Washington State 25–7.

The Orange Bowl had the next pick after the Fiesta Bowl pairing, and #3 (#5 BCS) Iowa was chosen. The Rose Bowl had the next BCS selection. The next, best available team to choose was #8 (#7 BCS) Oklahoma, who won the Big 12 Championship Game, to play Pac-10 winner Washington State. When it came time for the Orange Bowl and Sugar Bowl to make a second pick, both wanted the fifth-ranked USC Trojans. However, a BCS rule stated that if two bowls want the same team, the bowl with the higher payoff has the option. The Orange Bowl immediately extended an at-large bid to the Trojans and paired them with at-large number 3 Iowa in a Big Ten/Pac-10 "Rose Bowl" matchup in the Orange Bowl. Rose Bowl committee executive director Mitch Dorger was not pleased with the results. This left the Sugar Bowl with #14 BCS Florida State, the winner of the Atlantic Coast Conference. Notre Dame at 10–2 and #9 in the BCS standings was invited to the Gator Bowl. Kansas State at #8 also was left out.

=== Oklahoma Sooners ===
The Sooners won the Big 12 South and defeated Colorado in the Big 12 Championship Game. Kansas State, although ranked higher in the AP poll, lost to Colorado in the Big 12 North, and could not play in the championship game.

== Game summary ==
2003 Rose Bowl

Quarter	1	2	3	4	Total
No. 8 Oklahoma	3	14	3	14	34
No. 7 Washington State	0	0	0	14	14

at Rose Bowl • Pasadena, California

- Date: January 1, 2003
- Game time: 4:30 p.m. EST (1:30 p.m. PST)
- Game attendance: 86,848
- Referee: Steve Shaw (SEC)
- TV announcers (ABC): Brent Musburger (play-by-play) and Gary Danielson (analyst)
- ESPN game summary

Game information

First quarter

- OU - 12:13 DiCarlo 45-yard field goal OU 3 WSU 0

Second quarter

- OU - 1:51 Savage 12-yard pass from Hybl (DiCarlo kick) OU 10 WSU 0
- OU - 1:09 Perkins 51-yard punt return (DiCarlo kick) OU 17 WSU 0

Third quarter

- OU - 8:06 DiCarlo 30-yard field goal OU 20 WSU 0

Fourth quarter

- OU - 8:02 Fagan 9-yard pass from Hybl (DiCarlo kick) OU 27 WSU 0
- WSU - 6:08 Riley 37-yard pass from Gesser (Dunning kick) OU 27 WSU 7
- OU - 1:29 Griffin 19-yard run (DiCarlo kick) OU 34 WSU 7
- WSU - 1:15 Moore 89-yard kickoff return (Dunning kick) OU 34 WSU 14

=== Statistics ===
Statistics	OKLA	WSU
First downs	19	11
Plays–yards		
Rushes–yards	46-146	21-4
Passing yards	240	239
Passing: comp–att–int	19-29-0	17-34-1
Time of possession	37:14	22:46

Team	Category	Player	Statistics
OKLA	Passing	Nate Hybl	19-29, 240 yards, 2 TDs
OKLA	Rushing	Quentin Griffin	30 car, 144 yards, 1 TD
OKLA	Receiving	Will Peoples	3 rec, 80 yards
WSU	Passing	Jason Gesser	17-34, 239 yards, 1 TD, 2 INTs
WSU	Rushing	Jermaine Greene	8 car, 45 yards
WSU	Receiving	Jerome Riley	9 rec, 139 yards, 1 TD

== Aftermath ==
This game drew one of the lowest attendance numbers in the modern history of the Rose Bowl. It was the first time that the stadium held less than the nominal capacity for the Rose Bowl game since before the 1947 Rose Bowl and the agreement between the Pacific Coast and Big Ten conferences. The 1944 game had the third smallest crowd played in the Rose Bowl stadium at 68,000. The 1931 edition had the second smallest crowd at 60,000. The smallest crowd at the Rose Bowl stadium was the 1934 Rose Bowl at 35,000. Former University of Michigan coach Bo Schembechler remarked, "Didn't watch it," when asked what he thought of this game and also about the Nebraska-Miami Rose Bowl the previous year

During the early 2010s cycle of conference realignment, the Pac-10 eyed six Big 12 members as possible additions to the conference, including Oklahoma. However, the only Big 12 school that joined the Pac-10 (now the Pac-12) was Colorado, which returned to the Big 12 in 2024 after failing to win the Pac-12 in its 13 seasons there (2011-23).
