= List of Hardin–Simmons Cowboys in the NFL draft =

This is a list of Hardin–Simmons Cowboys football players in the NFL draft.

== Key ==
B	Back	K	Kicker	NT	Nose tackle
C	Center	LB	Linebacker	FB	Fullback
DB	Defensive back	P	Punter	HB	Halfback
DE	Defensive end	QB	Quarterback	WR	Wide receiver
DT	Defensive tackle	RB	Running back	G	Guard
E	End	T	Offensive tackle	TE	Tight end

= Pro Bowler
= Hall of Famer

== Selections ==
Year	Round	Pick	Overall	Player	Team	Position
1938	7	5	55	Ed Cherry	Chicago Cardinals	B
1940	1	7	7	Clyde "Bulldog" Turner	Chicago Bears	C
1940	15	5	135	Owen Goodnight	Cleveland Rams	B
1941	19	8	178	Dave Parker	Brooklyn Dodgers	E
1941	20	1	181	L. B. Russell	Philadelphia Eagles	B
1942	6	5	45	Murray Evans	Detroit Lions	B
1942	6	10	50	H.C. Burrus	Chicago Bears	E
1943	16	9	149	Buddy Tomlinson	Chicago Bears	T
1943	19	8	178	Hal Prescott	Green Bay Packers	E
1943	23	8	218	Earl Bennett	Green Bay Packers	G
1945	11	9	107	Rudy Mobley	Philadelphia Eagles	B
1947	14	6	121	Al Johnson	Philadelphia Eagles	B
1947	15	7	132	Joe Cook	Philadelphia Eagles	B
1948	26	5	240	Leon Cooper	Los Angeles Rams	T
1949	20	9	200	Earl Rowan	Chicago Cardinals	T
1950	4	13	53	Bob McChesney	Philadelphia Eagles	E
1950	15	3	238	Earl Rowan	Green Bay Packers	T
1950	27	9	348	Wilton "Hook" Davis	Chicago Bears	T
1950	28	2	354	Ed Petty	New York Bulldogs	C
1951	30	6	357	John "Model-T" Ford	Philadelphia Eagles	QB
1952	21	2	243	Wade Musgrove	Chicago Cardinals	G
1952	21	8	249	Gene Offield	San Francisco 49ers	C
1952	26	6	307	Dunny Goode	Washington Redskins	B
1954	10	5	114	D. C. Andrews	Chicago Bears	E
1954	15	11	180	Chet Lyssy	Cleveland Browns	B
1956	7	5	78	John Waedekin	Philadelphia Eagles	T
1957	22	9	262	Don Sizemore	Chicago Cardinals	B
1957	23	5	270	Connie Baird	Baltimore Colts	E
1957	28	5	330	Gene Cockrell	Cleveland Browns	T
1958	13	5	150	Ken "Model A" Ford	Washington Redskins	QB
1958	28	5	330	Joe Biggs	Washington Redskins	G
1959	12	3	135	Ted Edmondson	Chicago Cardinals	E
1959	13	7	151	Dewey Bohling	Pittsburgh Steelers	B
1959	17	2	194	Pete Hart	Chicago Cardinals	B
1959	22	7	259	Burley Polk	Pittsburgh Steelers	T
1964	3	2	30	Pat Batten	Detroit Lions	HB
