= 1949 Dixie Bowl =

Baylor Bears	Wake Forest Demon Deacons
(5–3–2)	(6–3)
20	7
Head coach: Bob Woodruff	Head coach: Peahead Walker
	AP 20
	1	2	3	4	Total
Baylor	6	14	0	0	20
Wake Forest	0	0	7	0	7
- Date: January 1, 1949
- Season: 1948
- Stadium: Legion Field
- Location: Birmingham, Alabama
- Referee: Jimmie C. Higgins (SWC; split crew: SWC, Southern)
- Attendance: 20,000

The 1949 Dixie Bowl, part of the 1948 bowl game season, took place on January 1, 1949, at Legion Field in Birmingham, Alabama. The competing teams were the Wake Forest Demon Deacons, representing the Southern Conference (SoCon), and the Baylor Bears, representing the Southwest Conference (SWC). Baylor was victorious in by a final score of 20–7.

== Teams ==
=== Baylor ===
The 1948 Baylor squad finished the regular season 5–3–2 with losses against Texas, Tulane and SMU and ties against Mississippi State and Rice. Following their tie against Rice, Dixie Bowl officials extended the Bears an invitation to play in the 1949 edition of the game, which Baylor accepted. The Dixie Bowl appearance marked the first ever postseason bowl game for Baylor.

=== Wake Forest ===
The 1948 Wake Forest squad finished the regular season 6–3 with losses against Boston College, North Carolina and Clemson. Following their victory over Duke, Dixie Bowl officials extended the Demon Deacons an invitation to play in the 1949 edition of the game, which Wake accepted. The appearance marked the first for Wake in the Dixie Bowl and their second overall bowl appearance.

== Game summary ==
Baylor opened the scoring in the first quarter after George Sims intercepted a Wake pass and returned it 52 yards to the Demon Deacons eight-yard line. Sammie Pierce scored from one yard out a few plays later and after Hank Dickerson missed the extra point, the Bears took a 6–0 lead. Baylor extended their lead to 20–0 at halftime after Jerry Mangrum scored from one-yard out and Harold Riley connected with Ray Painter for a 12-yard touchdown reception. Early in the third, Wake scored their only points of the game on a three-yard Mike Sprock run to make the final score 20–7.

Scoring summary

Quarter	Time	Drive			Team	Scoring information	Score	
Quarter	Time	Plays	Yards	TOP	Team	Scoring information	Baylor	Wake Forest
1			8 yards		Baylor	Sammie Pierce 1-yard touchdown run, Hank Dickerson kick no good	6	0
2			58 yards		Baylor	Jerry Mangrum 1-yard touchdown run, Hank Dickerson kick good	13	0
2			68 yards		Baylor	Harold Riley 12-yard touchdown reception from Ray Painter, Hank Dickerson kick good	20	0
3			3 plays, 13 yards		Wake Forest	Mike Sprock 3-yard touchdown run, kick good	20	7
"TOP" = time of possession. For other American football terms, see Glossary of American football.							20	7
