= 2024 American Athletic Conference women's volleyball tournament =

2024 American Athletic Conference Women's Volleyball Tournament
- Classification: Division I
- Teams: 8
- Site: Charles Koch Arena; Wichita, Kansas
- Champions: Wichita State (1 title)
- Winning coach: Kat Hollowell (1 title)
- MVP: Morgan Stout (Wichita State)
- Television: ESPN+
- American Athletic Conference Women's Volleyball Tournaments

2024 American Athletic Conference women's volleyball standings
	Conf.				Overall
Team	W		L	PCT	W		L	PCT
South Florida	14	–	2	.875	19	–	10	.655
Rice	13	–	3	.813	19	–	8	.704
East Carolina	11	–	5	.688	18	–	9	.667
Wichita State†	10	–	6	.625	18	–	13	.581
Tulsa	10	–	6	.625	18	–	11	.621
Florida Atlantic	8	–	8	.500	18	–	13	.581
North Texas	7	–	9	.438	10	–	18	.357
UAB	6	–	10	.375	11	–	17	.393
Memphis	6	–	10	.375	12	–	16	.429
Tulane	6	–	10	.375	14	–	14	.500
Temple	6	–	10	.375	14	–	16	.467
UTSA	5	–	11	.313	11	–	18	.379
Charlotte	2	–	14	.125	5	–	24	.172
† 2024 ACC tournament winner

The 2024 American Athletic Conference women's volleyball tournament is the third postseason women's volleyball tournament for the American Athletic Conference, and first since 2020–2021 season, during the 2024 NCAA Division I women's volleyball season. It was held November 22 through November 24, 2024 at the Charles Koch Arena in Witchita, Kansas. The winner received the conference's automatic bid to the 2024 NCAA Women's Volleyball Tournament.

== Seeds ==
The top eight teams will be eligible for the postseason, which consists of three round, single elimination style bracket. Teams were seeded by record within the conference, with a tiebreaker system to seed teams with identical conference records. (see Tie-Breaking Policies on page 7)

Seed	School	Conference	Tiebreaker
1	South Florida	14-2	–
2	Rice	13-3	–
3	East Carolina	11–5	–
4	Wichita State	10–6	2–0 record against Tulsa
5	Tulsa	10–6	0–2 record against Wichita State
6	Florida Atlantic	8–8	-
7	North Texas	7–9	-
8	UAB	6–10	(see Tie Break)

== Tie Break ==
UAB, Memphis, Tulane and Temple all finished with a 6–10 record and a tied 8th place. The tie goes to UAB, here's a breakdown.

Seed	School	head to head among tied teams	detail
8	UAB	3–2	(1–1 against Memphis) (1–1 against Tulane) (1–0 against Temple)
-	Memphis	2-2	(1–1 against UAB) (0–1 against Tulane) (1–0 against Temple)
-	Tulane	2–2	(1–1 against UAB) (1–0 against Memphis) (0–1 against Temple)
-	Temple	1-2	(0–1 against UAB) (1–0 against Memphis) (0–1 against Tulane)

If head to head record in insufficient to break the tie, the following stats will be used:
2. Number of sets won between all the tied teams
3. Number of points scored between all the tied teams
4. Number of sets won in all Conference matches
5. Number of points scored in all Conference matches
6. Coin toss conducted by the Conference administrator

== Schedule and results ==
All the matches are televised on ESPN+.

Time	Matchup	Score	Attendance
Quarterfinals – Friday, November 22
11:00 am	No. 3 East Carolina vs. No. 6 Florida Atlantic	2-3 (22–25,27-25,25-21,12-25,14-16)	440
1:30 pm (delay start at 2:30)	No. 2 Rice vs. No. 7 North Texas	3-1 (25–18, 22–25, 25–17, 25–19)	154
5:00 pm	No. 1 South Florida vs. No. 8 UAB	3-1 (25–13, 25–23, 13–25, 25–22)	790
7:30 pm	No. 4 Wichita State vs. No. 5 Tulsa	3-0 (25–20, 25–22, 25–22)	1001
Semifinals – Saturday, November 23
11:00 am	No. 2 Rice vs. No. 6 Florida Atlantic	2-3 (25–23,25-14,22-25,20-25,10-15)	258
2:00 pm	No. 1 South Florida vs. No. 4 Wichita State	3-0 (21–25,24-26,22-25)	1,245
Championship – Sunday, November 24
12:00 pm	No. 4 Wichita State vs. No. 6 Florida Atlantic	3-0 (25–22, 25–19, 25–19)	1,439
Game times are CT. Rankings denote tournament seeding.

== Bracket ==
Quarterfinals; Wednesday, November 22
3	East Carolina	2
6	Florida Atlantic	3
2	Rice	3
5	North Texas	1
1	South Florida	3
8	UAB	1
4	Wichita State	3
5	Tulsa	0

Semifinals; Friday, November 23
6	Florida Atlantic	3
2	Rice	2
1	South Florida	0
4	Wichita State	3

Championship; Saturday, November 24
6	Florida Atlantic	0
4	Wichita State	3

== All Tournament Team ==
Player	Grade	Position	School
Valeria Rosado	Senior	Outside Hitter/Right-side	Florida Atlantic
Katelynn Robine	Senior	Outside Hitter/Right-side	Florida Atlantic
Alyssa Gonzales	Redshirt-Freshman	Outside Hitter	Wichita State
Morgan Stout^	Redshirt-Senior	Middle Blocker	Wichita State
Izzi Strand	5th year	Setter	Wichita State
Nia McCardell	5th year	Libero	Rice
Caroline Dykes	Senior	Setter	South Florida

^Most Outstanding Player of the tournament
