= Bob Woodruff (American football) =

American player, coach, and administrator (1916–2001)

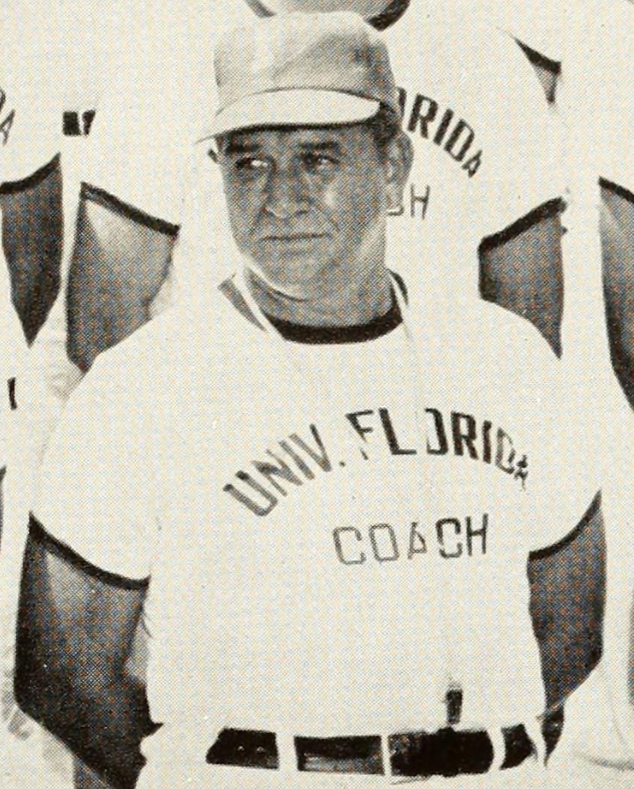
- Woodruff, c. 1956

Biographical details
- Born: March 14, 1916; Athens, Georgia, U.S.
- Died: November 1, 2001 (aged 85); Knoxville, Tennessee, U.S.

Playing career
- 1936–1938: Tennessee
- Position: Tackle

Coaching career (HC unless noted)
- 1939–1941: Tennessee (assistant)
- 1944–1945: Army (assistant)
- 1946: Georgia Tech (assistant)
- 1947–1949: Baylor
- 1950–1959: Florida
- 1961–1962: Tennessee (assistant)

Administrative career (AD unless noted)
- 1950–1959: Florida
- 1963–1985: Tennessee

Head coaching record
- Overall: 72–52–8
- Bowls: 2–1

Accomplishments and honors

Awards
- University of Florida Athletic Hall of Fame

George Robert Woodruff (March 14, 1916 – November 1, 2001) was an American college football player, coach, and sports administrator. Woodruff was a native of Georgia and an alumnus of the University of Tennessee, where he played college football. He was best known as the head coach of the Baylor University and University of Florida football teams, and later, as the athletic director at the University of Tennessee.

== Early life and education ==
Woodruff was born in Athens, Georgia, in 1916, and attended high school in Savannah, Georgia. After high school, he enrolled at the University of Tennessee in Knoxville, where he played tackle for the Tennessee Volunteers football team under head coach Robert Neyland. Woodruff graduated from Tennessee in 1939.

== Coaching career ==
=== Tennessee, Army and Georgia Tech assistant coach ===
Woodruff stayed in Knoxville after he graduated from the University of Tennessee, working as an assistant coach under Neyland during the 1939, 1940 and 1941 football seasons. During World War II, he was an officer in U.S. Army Corps of Engineers, and served as an assistant football coach under Earl Blaik at West Point in 1944 and 1945. He was discharged from the Army as a major in 1946, and accepted an assistant coaching position under Bobby Dodd at Georgia Tech. The 1939 and 1940 Volunteers teams had ranked among the top five in the final Associated Press (AP) football poll; the AP declared the Cadets national champions in 1944 and 1945. Woodruff gained the experience of being a part of three great college coaching staffs.

=== Baylor Bears head coach ===
Woodruff became the head football coach at Baylor University in Waco, Texas in 1947. He coached the Baylor Bears football team for three seasons from 1947 through 1949, compiling a 19–10–2 record. His 1948 Bears posted a 6–3–2 record and finished with a 20–7 win over Wake Forest in the Dixie Bowl. Woodruff coached his 1949 Bears to a final AP Poll top-20 ranking and an 8–2 record, but the Bears did not receive a bowl bid. In early December 1949, Woodruff became embroiled in a dispute with the Baylor athletic director, Ralph Wolf, which became public when both Woodruff and Wolf resigned their positions within twenty-four hours on December 9 and 10. Although the subject of their dispute was never publicly disclosed, the university announced that Woodruff had withdrawn his resignation and would keep his position on December 14, but Woodruff resigned a second time on January 6, 1950 to become the head football coach and athletic director at the University of Florida.

=== Florida Gators head coach ===
After the 1949 season, Woodruff replaced Raymond Wolf as the head football coach at the University of Florida in Gainesville, Florida. In order to induce Woodruff to coach the Florida Gators football team, the Florida Board of Control offered him a seven-year guaranteed contract at $17,000 per year. Woodruff's annual salary was $5,000 more than that of University of Florida President J. Hillis Miller. He was only 34 years old.

Woodruff's coaching philosophy reflected that of his mentor, Tennessee Volunteers coach Robert Neyland, who emphasized defense and the kicking game. Ironically, his first Gators team in 1950 had a stellar offense and a weak defensive squad. The Gators offense was led by quarterback Haywood Sullivan, the first sophomore in Southeastern Conference (SEC) history to throw for more than 1,000 yards in a season, under Woodruff's offensive coordinator, Frank Broyles. Florida managed to upset the thirteenth-ranked Vanderbilt Commodores in Nashville, Tennessee, propelling the Gators into the top twenty teams of the Associated Press (AP) Poll for the first time. With the addition of Rick Casares to the backfield, Woodruff's 1951 Gators scored a 30–21 upset of the heavily favored Alabama Crimson Tide in their homecoming game in Tuscaloosa, Alabama.

The 1952 Gators were Woodruff's most successful team, and the 1952 season included some of his most inspired coaching. After quarterback Haywood Sullivan left school early to accept a professional baseball contract with Boston Red Sox, Woodruff experimented with fullback Rick Casares at quarterback, but after three games it was apparent that Casares was not the solution. Woodruff's unconventional replacement, defensive back Doug Dickey, turned out to be exactly what the Gators needed at quarterback—a talented athlete and savvy game manager. Woodruff led his 1952 Gators team to the program's first top-twenty finish in the AP Poll, their first NCAA-sanctioned bowl game, the Gator Bowl, and a 14–13 bowl win over the Tulsa Golden Hurricane. At the conclusion of the 1952 season, senior defensive tackle Charlie LaPradd became the Gators' third first-team All-American.

Although Woodruff was a talented administrator, he sometimes had difficulty expressing himself verbally. He would often stop mid-sentence to collect his thoughts, which Charlie LaPradd once described as "With [Woodruff's] long periods of silence, he would make you wonder if he was thirty minutes ahead of you or thirty minutes behind." Team manager Hill Brannon remembered one of Woodruff's many Yogi Berra-esque pre-game exhortations as "Remember, the team that makes the fewest mistakes, makes the fewest mistakes." In a moment of self-deprecating humor, Woodruff once described himself as "the oratorical equivalent of a blocked punt."

Woodruff also developed a reputation for identifying and fostering talented young assistant coaches. His Gators assistants included Frank Broyles, future head football coach of the Arkansas Razorbacks; Hank Foldberg, future head coach of the Texas A&M Aggies; Dale Hall, future head coach of the Army Black Knights; John Sauer, future head coach of The Citadel Bulldogs; John Rauch, future head coach of the Buffalo Bills and Oakland Raiders; and Tonto Coleman, former head coach of the Abilene Christian Wildcats and future commissioner of the Southeastern Conference. His Gators players included Doug Dickey, the future head coach of the Tennessee Volunteers and Florida Gators.

In the competitive SEC of the 1950s, Woodruff's Gators would not win more than six games again in a season, but they were ranked in the top twenty teams of the final AP Poll in each of 1957, 1958 and 1959. Woodruff coached the Florida Gators football team for ten seasons from 1950 through 1959, finishing with a 53–42–6 record. During his tenure, Woodruff's Gators scored notable upsets, suffered close losses, received their first two NCAA-sanctioned bowl game invitations and their first four final AP poll rankings, but Woodruff's greatest legacy in Gainesville may have been rebuilding the Gators into a team that was consistently competitive against the other major football programs of the SEC, and thereby laying the groundwork for the future successes of Ray Graves' 1960s Florida Gators teams that followed.

Woodruff was inducted into the University of Florida Athletic Hall of Fame as an "honorary letter winner" in 1983.

== Athletic director ==
During his time as the Gators football coach, Woodruff also worked as Florida's athletic director. From 1963 to 1985, Woodruff served as the athletic director at his alma mater, the University of Tennessee. As Tennessee athletic director, Woodruff oversaw the rise of the Volunteers' athletic program as a nationally recognized power and was responsible for the renovation, expansion and construction of the university's state-of-the-art athletic facilities. Between 1963 and 1985, the Volunteers won national championships in cross country, swimming and diving, and track and field, and participated in fifteen football bowl games, eight NCAA men's basketball tournaments and four NIT basketball tournaments. Woodruff also served on the U.S. Olympic Committee for the 1972 Olympic Games in Munich, Germany. When he retired in 1985, he was succeeded as Tennessee athletic director by another former Gators football coach and his former Gators quarterback, Doug Dickey.

== Death ==
Woodruff died in Knoxville on November 1, 2001; he was 85 years old. He was survived by his second wife, Gertrude "Trudy" Handly Woodruff, three sons, a daughter, a stepson, and four grandchildren. His first wife, Margaret Artley Woodruff, died in 1977.

== Head coaching record ==
Year	Team	Overall	Conference	Standing	Bowl/playoffs	Coaches^{#}	AP^{°}
Baylor Bears (Southwestern Conference) (1947–1949)
1947	Baylor	5–5	1–5	7th			
1948	Baylor	6–3–2	3–2–1	T–3rd	W Dixie		
1949	Baylor	8–2	4–2	2nd			20
Baylor:		19–10–2	8–9–1				
Florida Gators (Southeastern Conference) (1950–1959)
1950	Florida	5–5	2–4	10th			
1951	Florida	5–5	2–4	T–9th			
1952	Florida	8–3	3–3	6th	W Gator		15
1953	Florida	3–5–2	1–3–2	9th			
1954	Florida	5–5	5–2	T–3rd			
1955	Florida	4–6	3–5	10th			
1956	Florida	6–3–1	5–2	3rd			
1957	Florida	6–2–1	4–2–1	T–3rd			17
1958	Florida	6–4–1	2–3–1	6th	L Gator	15	14
1959	Florida	5–4–1	2–4	9th			19
Florida:		53–42–6	29–32–4				
Total:		72–52–8					
^{#}Rankings from final Coaches Poll.; ^{°}Rankings from final AP Poll.

== See also ==
- List of University of Florida Athletic Hall of Fame members
- List of University of Tennessee people
