= 1948 Nebraska Cornhuskers football team =

American college football season

1948 Nebraska Cornhuskers football
- Program for Nov. 27 game at OSC
- Conference: Big Seven Conference
- Record: 2–8 (2–4 Big 7)
- Head coach: George Clark (2nd season)
- Offensive scheme: T formation
- Home stadium: Memorial Stadium

1948 Big Seven Conference football standings
| | Conf. | | | | | Overall |
| Team | W | | L | | T | W | | L | | T |
|---|---|---|---|---|---|---|---|---|---|---|
| No. 5 Oklahoma $ | 5 | – | 0 | – | 0 | 10 | – | 1 | – | 0 |
| Missouri | 5 | – | 1 | – | 0 | 8 | – | 3 | – | 0 |
| Kansas | 4 | – | 2 | – | 0 | 7 | – | 3 | – | 0 |
| Colorado | 2 | – | 3 | – | 0 | 3 | – | 6 | – | 0 |
| Iowa State | 2 | – | 4 | – | 0 | 4 | – | 6 | – | 0 |
| Nebraska | 2 | – | 4 | – | 0 | 2 | – | 8 | – | 0 |
| Kansas State | 0 | – | 6 | – | 0 | 1 | – | 9 | – | 0 |
$ – Conference champion; Rankings from AP Poll

The 1948 Nebraska Cornhuskers football team was the representative of the University of Nebraska and member of the Big 7 Conference in the 1948 college football season. The team was coached by George Clark.

Nebraska was ranked at No. 87 in the final Litkenhous Difference by Score System ratings for 1948.

The team played its home games at Memorial Stadium in Lincoln, Nebraska.

== Before the season ==
Nebraska athletic director and one-time head football coach Adolph J. Lewandowski brought back the coach he initially chose as his own replacement for 1945, George Clark, who had departed Nebraska after just that one season. With the unsuccessful tenure of previous head coach Bernie Masterson ended, Lewandowski was able to turn to the last, most recent coach that had provided a glimmer of hope to the Cornhuskers in nearly a decade. So it was that after seven straight losing seasons, the coaching staff once again suffered a shakeup in hopes of ending the downward spiral of Nebraska football as the Cornhuskers entered their first-ever 10-game season.

The 1948 season was the first to see Colorado's athletic teams participate in conference play, as the Big 6 Conference subsequently became known as the Big 7 Conference. Nebraska and Colorado were set to meet again on the field for the first time since 1907, now as part of regular season conference play.

== Schedule ==
| Date | Time | Opponent | Site | Result | Attendance |
|---|---|---|---|---|---|
| September 25 | 2:00 pm | Iowa State | Memorial Stadium; Lincoln, NE (rivalry) | W 19–15 | 34,514 |
| October 2 | 2:00 pm | at Minnesota* | Memorial Stadium; Minneapolis, MN (rivalry) | L 13–39 | 57,206 |
| October 9 | 3:30 pm | at Colorado | Folsom Field; Boulder, CO (rivalry) | L 6–19 | 19,516 |
| October 16 | 2:00 pm | No. 2 Notre Dame* | Memorial Stadium; Lincoln, NE (rivalry) | L 13–44 | 37,400 |
| October 23 | 2:00 pm | at Kansas | Memorial Stadium; Lawrence, KS (rivalry) | L 7–27 | 36,500 |
| October 30 | 2:00 pm | UCLA*^{†} | Memorial Stadium; Lincoln, NE | L 15–27 | 36,000 |
| November 6 | 2:00 pm | Kansas State | Memorial Stadium; Lincoln, NE (rivalry) | W 32–0 | 36,000 |
| November 13 | 2:30 pm | at No. 9 Oklahoma | Oklahoma Memorial Stadium; Norman, OK (rivalry) | L 14–41 | 28,000 |
| November 20 | 2:00 pm | Missouri | Memorial Stadium; Lincoln, NE (rivalry) | L 6–33 | 21,000 |
| November 27 | 4:00 pm | at Oregon State* | Multnomah Stadium; Portland, OR | L 12–28 | 13,000 |
*Non-conference game; ^{†}Homecoming; Rankings from AP Poll released prior to the game

== Roster ==
Official Roster
| 20 Ackerman, Robert HB; 13 Bauer, Arthur G; 25 Bloom, Don HB; 11 Bostwick, George E; 62 Cochrane, Alex E; 28 Collopy, Frank FB; 12 Costello, Robert QB; 21 Damkroger, Ralph E; 29 DiBiase, Michael G; 33 Dorn, Harold HB; 33 Ferguson, Gerald HB; 14 Fischer, Cletus QB; 15 Fischer, Kenneth HB; 34 Fletcher, Howard E; 38 Godfrey, James T; 49 Goeglein, Richard T; 40 Golan, Fred T; 39 Harkrader, James G; 43 Hawkins, Fred G; 51 Hazen, Jack E; 63 Hutton, Richard HB; 44 Lee, Kirk HB; 27 Lipps, Robert G | 45 Magsamen, Raymond E; 43 McGill, Joe C; 10 Means, Arden G; 50 Meyer, Frank HB; 42 Moomey, William HB; 32 Moore, Gerald FB; 23 Mueller, William HB; Mullen, Robert C; 52 Myers, James FB; 61 Novak, Tom C; 53 Pizinger, Warren G; 57 Reese, Herbert T; 54 Sailors, Don E; 18 Salestrom, Darwin G; 55 Schneider, Don FB; 36 Schneider, Robert E; 24 Sedlacek, John T; 16 Spellman, Walt C; 60 Story, Charles HB; Strasheim, Don HB; 64 Toogood, Charles T; 41 Wiegand, Delbert QB; 46 Young, Philip FB |

== Coaching staff ==
| Name | Title | First year in this position | Years at Nebraska | Alma mater |
|---|---|---|---|---|
| George Clark | Head coach | 1948 | 1945, 1948 | Illinois |
| L. F. "Pop" Klein | Assistant coach | 1945 | 1945–1958 | |
| Ray Prochaska | End Coach | 1946 | 1946–1948, 1950–1954 | Nebraska |
| Tony Blazine | Line Coach | 1947 | 1947–1948 | |
| Dougal Russell | Backfield Coach | 1947 | 1947–1948 | Kansas State |
| Ike Hanscomb | Freshman Coach | 1948 | 1948–1953 | |
| H. H. Miller | | 1948 | 1948 | |

== Game summaries ==
=== Iowa State ===
| Team | 1 | 2 | Total |
|---|---|---|---|
| • Nebraska | | | 19 |
| Iowa State | | | 15 |

- Date: September 25
- Location: Memorial Stadium • Lincoln, Nebraska
- Game attendance: 34,514

The Cornhuskers opened the season and welcomed Coach Clark back with a win, the third straight over the Cyclones. The home opening victory snapped Nebraska's six-season opening game losing streak, and the Cornhuskers improved over Iowa State to 33–8–1.

=== Minnesota ===
| Team | 1 | 2 | Total |
|---|---|---|---|
| Nebraska | | | 13 |
| • Minnesota | | | 39 |

- Date: October 2
- Location: Memorial Stadium • Minneapolis
- Game attendance: 57,206

Unsurprisingly, given Minnesota's historical dominance over Nebraska, even as the Cornhuskers continued to seek stability, the Golden Gophers had little trouble with Nebraska in Minneapolis. Minnesota had now defeated the Cornhuskers in nine straight games, and continued to pull away in the series, 24–4–2.

=== Colorado ===
| Team | 1 | 2 | Total |
|---|---|---|---|
| Nebraska | | | 6 |
| • Colorado | | | 19 |

- Date: October 9
- Location: Folsom Field • Boulder, Colorado

Although Nebraska and Colorado had met on the field six times before, this was the first since a 22–8 Nebraska victory from 1907, and the first time the teams had met as conference foes. The Buffaloes sent Nebraska back to Lincoln with a 6–19 loss, but still lagged in the series at 2–5.

=== Notre Dame ===
| Team | 1 | 2 | Total |
|---|---|---|---|
| • #2 Notre Dame | | | 44 |
| Nebraska | | | 13 |

- Date: October 16
- Location: Memorial Stadium • Lincoln, Nebraska
- Game attendance: 37,400

When Notre Dame arrived in Lincoln, they brought with them a #2 AP Poll ranking and were probably not seriously worried about getting a fight from the Cornhuskers. Nebraska avoided the shutout, but allowed the Fighting Irish 44 points to take home a convincing win and improve over the Cornhuskers to 7–5–1. Notre Dame went on to finish the season undefeated at 9–0 and still at #2.

=== Kansas ===
| Team | 1 | 2 | Total |
|---|---|---|---|
| Nebraska | | | 7 |
| • Kansas | | | 27 |

- Date: October 23
- Location: Memorial Stadium • Lawrence, Kansas
- Game attendance: 36,500

Nebraska dropped a second straight game to Kansas for the first time since 1909, as the Cornhuskers continued to struggle for success. Although Nebraska still held a dominating 40–11–3 series lead over the Jayhawks, losses over the last several seasons were piling up everywhere.

=== UCLA ===
| Team | 1 | 2 | Total |
|---|---|---|---|
| • UCLA | | | 27 |
| Nebraska | | | 15 |

- Date: October 30
- Location: Memorial Stadium • Lincoln, Nebraska
- Game attendance: 36,000

After one year off, Nebraska and UCLA met again for their second-ever meeting, this time in Lincoln. The Bruins had been ranked #4 last time, as the Cornhuskers had been sent home smarting from a shutout loss 0–18. This time, UCLA came to Lincoln unranked, but the outcome was unchanged. Nebraska dropped another homecoming game, the fifth straight loss of the season, and fell to 0–2 against UCLA.

=== Kansas State ===
| Team | 1 | 2 | Total |
|---|---|---|---|
| Kansas State | | | 0 |
| • Nebraska | | | 32 |

- Date: November 6
- Location: Memorial Stadium • Lincoln, Nebraska
- Game attendance: 36,000

If there was any consolation to the Cornhuskers that things could be worse, it was the Kansas State Wildcats that continued to bring the good news. Amidst a record string of consecutive losing seasons, the Cornhuskers handed Kansas State a shutout. The 32–0 defeat of the Wildcats was Nebraska's sixth-straight victory over the team from Manhattan, and the Cornhuskers improved to 26–4–2 in the series.

=== Oklahoma ===
| Team | 1 | 2 | Total |
|---|---|---|---|
| Nebraska | | | 14 |
| • #9 Oklahoma | | | 41 |

- Date: November 13
- Location: Oklahoma Memorial Stadium • Norman, Oklahoma
- Game attendance: 28,000

By the time the Cornhuskers arrived in Norman to face the #9 Sooners, there wasn't much to fight for. With only two conference wins so far, any chance of a league title was out of sight. Oklahoma rolled over Nebraska without much effort, but the 14–41 loss showed that the Cornhuskers were not completely out of the game. This was the sixth straight defeat of Nebraska in the series, and their all-time lead of 16–8–3 over the Sooners continued to shrink.

=== Missouri ===
| Team | 1 | 2 | Total |
|---|---|---|---|
| • Missouri | | | 33 |
| Nebraska | | | 6 |

- Date: November 20
- Location: Memorial Stadium • Lincoln, Nebraska
- Game attendance: 21,000

In front of a crowd reduced by over a third from the last home game, Nebraska fell to Missouri to close out the 1948 home season. It was their fourth straight loss to the Tigers in a row, but Missouri still had some distance to cover to catch up in the series, as they still trailed the Cornhuskers 14–24–3.

=== Oregon State ===
| Team | 1 | 2 | Total |
|---|---|---|---|
| Nebraska | | | 12 |
| • Oregon State | | | 28 |

- Date: November 27
- Location: Multnomah Stadium • Portland, Oregon
- Game attendance: 13,000

The Cornhuskers brought the 1948 season to a close with a long road trip to Portland to face Oregon State. Nebraska historically dominated the Beavers, but had lost a decision against them in the last meeting of the squads last year. This year would come to the same result, as the Cornhuskers fell once again and allowed Oregon State to narrow the series to 2–5.

== After the season ==
Coach Clark's return did not bring about the hoped-for results, though one year is hard to judge by. His return to program was cut short after this season, but he still holds the distinction of being the only Nebraska head football coach to serve at different times. Combined with his 1945 performance, his Nebraska career total was a disappointing 6–13–0 (.316), while his conference record stood at 4–7–0 (.374). With eight straight losing seasons now strung together, the Cornhusker football program fell to 120–37–11 (.747) against conference foes, and to 316–148–31 overall (.670). Once again Nebraska sought a head football coach, who would be the fifth over the previous nine years.
