= 1949 Gator Bowl =

American college football game

Missouri Tigers	Clemson Tigers
(8–2)	(10–0)
Big Seven	SoCon
23	24
Head coach: Don Faurot	Head coach: Frank Howard
	AP 11
	1	2	3	4	Total
Missouri	0	14	2	7	23
Clemson	14	0	7	3	24
- Date: January 1, 1949
- Season: 1948
- Stadium: Gator Bowl Stadium
- Location: Jacksonville, Florida
- MVP: HB Bobby Gage (Clemson)
- Referee: Louis House (Big Seven; split crew: Big Seven, Southern)
- Attendance: 35,273

The 1949 Gator Bowl was a college football post-season bowl game that featured the Missouri Tigers and the Clemson Tigers.

== Background ==
Missouri went 8-2, an improvement of two games from last season, with a five-game winning streak occurring after a 21-7 loss to Ohio State. They finished 5-1 in the Big Seven Conference, losing to Oklahoma 41-7.

Meanwhile, in 1947, Clemson had gone 4-5, though they won their last three games to finish with a second straight losing season. In 1948, however, they got off to a hot start, routing Presbyterian and NC State with 59 points and allowing none. They rose to #14 by week 4, as they ran the table and finished the regular season 10-0, with a perfect 5-0 record in the Southern Conference. This was their first conference title since 1940. Going into this game, the Tigers had won 13 straight games as they went to their first bowl game in nine years.

== Game summary ==
- Clemson - Fred Cone, 1 yard touchdown run (Jack Miller kick)
- Clemson - Fred Cone, 1 yard touchdown run (Miller kick)
- Missouri - Harold Entsminger, 23 yard touchdown run (Dawson kick)
- Missouri - Harold Entsminger, 1 yard touchdown run (Dawson kick)
- Clemson - John Poulos 9 yard touchdown pass from Bobby Gage (Miller kick)
- Missouri - Safety
- Clemson - Miller, 32 yard field goal
- Missouri - Kenneth Bounds, 20 yard touchdown pass from Braznell (Dawson kick)

Missouri had 16 first downs to Clemson's 19, while rushing for 225 yards on 52 carries to Clemson's 186 yards on 42 carries. Missouri passed for 73 yards while Clemson passed for 112. Both teams had 298 yards. Missouri had 3 punts and a 31.0 yard average while Clemson punted once for 35 yards. Missouri lost the ball twice on fumbles while Clemson had one interception. Missouri had four penalties for 42 yards and Clemson had 2 penalties for 10 yards.

For Clemson, Gage went 10-of-23 for 112 yards and one touchdown, while rushing for 25 yards on 15 carries. Fred Cone rushed for 72 yards on 14 carries for two touchdowns. Harold Entsminger rushed for 77 yards on 17 carries and two touchdowns for Missouri

The attendance for the game was 35,273.

== Aftermath ==
The following year, Missouri went 7-4, while Clemson went 4-4-2. Missouri went to the Gator Bowl the following year, but lose again. Clemson did not go to another Gator Bowl until 1952.
