= 1948 Kansas Jayhawks football team =

American college football season

1948 Kansas Jayhawks football
- Conference: Big Seven Conference
- Record: 7–3 (4–2 Big 7)
- Head coach: Jules V. Sikes (1st season)
- Captains: Hugh Johnson; Frank Pattee
- Home stadium: Memorial Stadium

1948 Big Seven Conference football standings
	Conf.					Overall
Team	W		L		T	W		L		T
No. 5 Oklahoma $	5	–	0	–	0	10	–	1	–	0
Missouri	5	–	1	–	0	8	–	3	–	0
Kansas	4	–	2	–	0	7	–	3	–	0
Colorado	2	–	3	–	0	3	–	6	–	0
Iowa State	2	–	4	–	0	4	–	6	–	0
Nebraska	2	–	4	–	0	2	–	8	–	0
Kansas State	0	–	6	–	0	1	–	9	–	0
$ – Conference champion; Rankings from AP Poll

The 1948 Kansas Jayhawks football team represented the University of Kansas in the Big Seven Conference during the 1948 college football season. In their first season under head coach Jules V. Sikes, the Jayhawks compiled a 7–3 record (4–2 against conference opponents), finished third in the Big Seven Conference, and outscored all opponents by a combined total of 199 to 137.

Kansas was ranked at No. 47 in the final Litkenhous Difference by Score System ratings for 1948. They played their home games at Memorial Stadium in Lawrence, Kansas.

On October 9, 1948, the Jayhawks played the 500th game in program history, a 20-7 victory over Iowa State. The team won seven of its first eight games but finished the season with back-to-back losses to Oklahoma and Missouri.

Notable players on the 1948 squad included fullback Forrest Griffith, quarterback Dick Gilman, end Bryan Sperry, tackle Mike McCormack, and guard Dick Tomlinson. Griffith was the team's leading rusher with 368 yards on 96 carries; he was also the leading scorer with 37 points scored on six touchdowns and an extra point. Gilman was the leading passer with 44 completions on 129 attempts for 945 passing yards, 14 interceptions and 14 touchdown passes.

== Schedule ==
Date	Opponent	Site	Result	Attendance	Source
September 18	TCU*	Memorial Stadium; Lawrence, KS	L 13–14	26,000	
September 24	at Denver*	Hilltop Stadium; Denver, CO	W 40–0	25,070	
October 2	Colorado	Memorial Stadium; Lawrence, KS	W 40–7	21,000	
October 9	at Iowa State	Clyde Williams Field; Ames, IA	W 20–7	11,959	
October 15	at George Washington*	Griffith Stadium; Washington, DC	W 12–0	13,814	
October 23	Nebraska^{†}	Memorial Stadium; Lawrence, KS (rivalry)	W 27–7	36,500	
October 30	Oklahoma A&M*	Memorial Stadium; Lawrence, KS	W 13–7	23,957	
November 13	at Kansas State	Memorial Stadium; Manhattan, KS (rivalry)	W 20–14	18,000	
November 20	No. 8 Oklahoma	Memorial Stadium; Lawrence, KS	L 7–60	39,000	
November 25	at Missouri	Memorial Stadium; Columbia, MO (rivalry)	L 7–21	32,000	
*Non-conference game; ^{†}Homecoming; Rankings from AP Poll released prior to the game

== After the season ==
=== NFL draft ===
The following Jayhawks were selected in the 1949 NFL draft following the season.

Round	Pick	Player	Position	NFL club
22	219	Dick Bertuzzi	Back	Chicago Bears
23	228	Frank Pattee	Back	Washington Redskins
