= Wichita State Shockers =

Intercollegiate sports teams of Wichita State University

- University: Wichita State University
- Nickname: Shockers
- NCAA: Division I
- Conference: The American (primary); CUSA (bowling)
- Athletic director: Kevin Saal
- Location: Wichita, Kansas
- Varsity teams: 16
- Football stadium: Crossland Stadium
- Basketball arena: Charles Koch Arena
- Baseball stadium: Eck Stadium
- Softball stadium: Wilkins Stadium
- Colors: Black and yellow
- Mascot: WuShock
- Website: goshockers.com

Team NCAA championships
- 1

Individual and relay NCAA champions
- 3

The Wichita State Shockers are the athletic teams that represent Wichita State University, located in Wichita, Kansas, in intercollegiate sports as a member of the NCAA Division I ranks, primarily competing in the American Conference (American) (Note: The conference was known as the American Athletic Conference until July 2025.) since the 2017–18 academic year. The Shockers previously competed in the D-I Missouri Valley Conference (MVC) from 1945–46 to 2016–17; as an Independent from 1940–41 to 1944–45; in the Central Intercollegiate Athletic Conference (CIC) from 1923–24 to 1939–40; and in the Kansas Collegiate Athletic Conference (KIAC) of the National Association of Intercollegiate Athletics (NAIA) from 1902–03 to 1922–23. As of the 2020s conference realignment, Wichita State is one of two full members of the American (along with Temple) to have never been a full member of Conference USA, although it became a single-sport member of that conference for bowling in 2024. From Wichita State's arrival in the American until Grand Canyon joined the Mountain West Conference in 2025, it was the only non-football-sponsoring institution to be a member of an FBS conference.

== History ==
The name for WSU's athletic teams is the Shockers and, collectively, students are also referred to as being "Shockers". The name reflects the university's heritage. Early students at what was then Fairmount College earned money by shocking, or harvesting, wheat in nearby fields. Early football games were played on a stubbled wheat field. Pep club members were known as Wheaties. Tradition has it that in 1904, football manager and student R.J. Kirk came up with the nickname Wheatshockers. Although the Wheatshockers name was never officially adopted by the university, it caught on among the fan base. Newspaper writers also liked it because it was easily shortened to "Shockers" in headlines, and the shorter name was officially adopted by around the time Fairmount became the Municipal University of Wichita in 1926.

Until 1948, the university used a nameless shock of wheat as its symbol. In 1948, junior Wilbur Elsea won the Kappa Pi honorary society's competition to design a mascot typifying the spirit of the school. Elsea, who had been a marine during World War II, decided that "the school needed a mascot who gave a tough impression, with a serious, no-nonsense scowl." Once Elsea's mascot was adopted, all that was needed was a name. The Oct. 7, 1948, issue of The Sunflower, the student newspaper, ran an advertisement urging students to submit names for the school's new mascot. It was freshman Jack Kersting who suggested the winning name, "WuShock."

In 1998, WuShock, also referred to as "Wu", marked his 50th birthday by undergoing a redesign and getting a pumped-up physique and revved-up attitude. The mascot's costume has changed over the years, as well. With the redesign, a new costume was introduced in fall 1998. In fall 1999, the head of the new costume underwent another redesign after a number of supporters suggested the mascot needed a more intimidating look. In 2006 it was decided to once again update the Wu costume. The general consensus was that many wanted the costume to more accurately reflect the depiction of WU in the school's logo. Many officials feel that a more professional and intimidating mascot on the field will certainly bolster WSU's image.

== Conference affiliations ==
American logo in Wichita State's colors

NCAA

- Missouri Valley Conference (1949–2017)
- American Conference (2017–present)

== Varsity sports ==
WSU competes in 16 intercollegiate athletic teams: Men's sports include baseball, basketball, cross country, golf, tennis and track & field (indoor and outdoor); while women's sports include basketball, bowling, cross country, golf, softball, tennis, track & field (indoor and outdoor) and volleyball. Also, it offers club sports such as crew, bowling, shooting sports, and other intramural sports. The most recently added varsity sport is women's bowling, which was elevated to full varsity status in 2024–25 and joined Conference USA at that time.

Men's sports	Women's sports
Baseball	Basketball
Basketball	Bowling
Cross country	Cross country
Golf	Golf
Tennis	Softball
Track and field^{†}	Tennis
	Track and field^{†}
	Volleyball
† – Track and field includes both indoor and outdoor

=== Football ===
Wichita State University fielded a football team for 90 years before it was cut in 1986 due to poor attendance, financial red ink, NCAA recruiting violations, and the state of disrepair of Crossland Stadium. This followed the Missouri Valley Conference ending its sponsorship of football in 1985, which left only Wichita and Tulsa remaining at the Division I-A level (now known as FBS), as the rest of the schools either dropped to Division I-AA (now FCS) or Division II. The program saw a great deal of success in its early years, but after moving up to the University Division and joining the Missouri Valley Conference in 1947, the program became known as one of the worst in the nation, with only 3 of the 15 coaches they had over that period posting winning records. Nevertheless, Wichita managed to play in three bowl games. On Jan. 1, 1948, they lost in the Raisin Bowl to Pacific. In December 1948, Wichita played in the Camellia Bowl, where they fell to Hardin–Simmons. They did not participate in another bowl game until 1961, when they lost to Villanova in the Sun Bowl. Wichita State also won four Missouri Valley Conference football titles, in 1954, 1960, 1961, and 1963.

==== Football team plane crash ====
On October 2, 1970, the first, or "gold" plane (the twin plane to the second, or black, plane) carrying players and staff of the WSU football team took off from a Colorado airport after refueling, bound for Logan, Utah for a game against Utah State University. It flew into a mountain valley too narrow to enable it to turn back and smashed into a mountainside, killing 31 of the 40 players, administrators and fans near a ski resort 40 miles (64 km) away from Denver.

==== Bowl games ====
Season	Bowl	Champion		Runner-up	
1947	Raisin Bowl	Pacific	26	Wichita	14
1948	Camellia Bowl	Hardin–Simmons	49	Wichita	12
1961	Sun Bowl	Villanova	17	Wichita State	9

==== Notable players ====
Legendary NFL coach Bill Parcells was a linebacker at WSU in 1962 and 1963 before serving as a graduate assistant in 1964. Wichita State University was also the first Division I-A school to hire a black head coach in college football, Willie Jeffries in 1979. In 1978 place kicker Joe Williams tied University of Arkansas All-American kicker Steve Little and University of Texas kicker Russell Erxleben for the longest kick in NCAA history after kicking a 67-yard field goal. That record still stands today. Defensive end Jumpy Geathers was the last WSU football player to play in the NFL and also had the longest NFL career. His career spanned from 1984 to 1996, playing for the New Orleans Saints, Washington Redskins, Atlanta Falcons, and Denver Broncos. He also won Super Bowl XXVI with the Redskins.

==== Experimental game ====
See 1905 Washburn vs. Fairmount football game

On December 25, 1905, Washburn University played Fairmount College (former name of WSU) in an experimental game testing a rule forcing the offense to earn a first down in three plays instead of four. The experiment was considered a failure.

=== Basketball ===
==== Men's ====
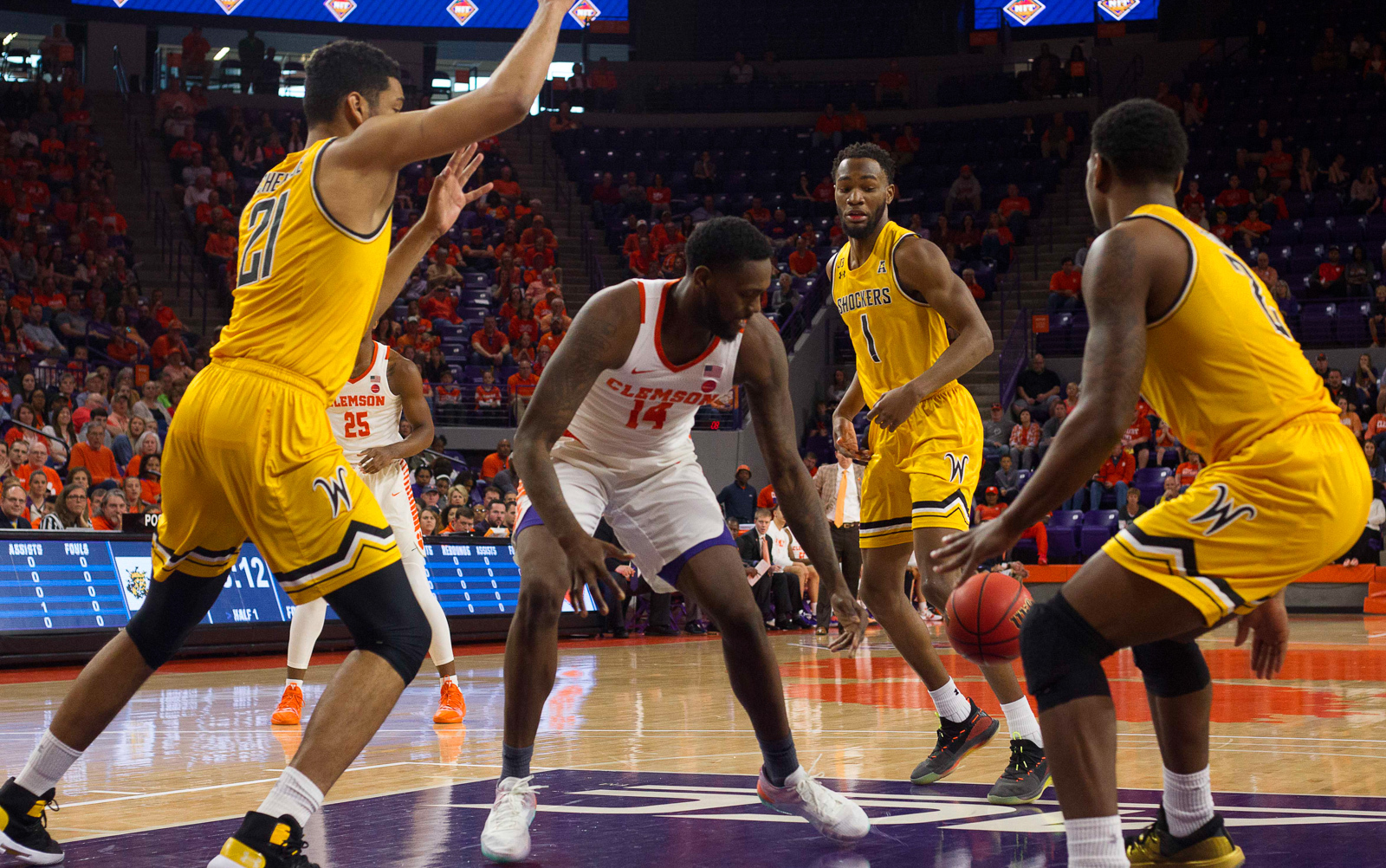
Shockers men's basketball defenders surround a Clemson Tigers men's basketball player during a game in 2019

The Shockers men's basketball team is coached by Paul Mills and competes in the American Conference after 72 seasons in the Missouri Valley Conference. The men's basketball team reached the Final Four in 1965 and 2013, the "elite eight" in 1981, the "sweet sixteen" in 2006 and 2015, as well as winning the 2011 NIT title, the first non-conference tournament, post-season championship in the program's history. In 2013–14, the Shockers become the first NCAA Division I men's team to enter the NCAA tournament unbeaten in over 20 years. Current Houston Rockets point guard Fred VanVleet was a backup at that position for the 2013 Final Four team, and started for the next season's team that finished the regular season unbeaten.

==== Women's ====
The Shockers women's basketball team is currently coached by Keitha Adams. In 2013, the Shockers qualified for their first NCAA tournament in team history after winning the Missouri Valley Conference tournament title. They repeated the feat in 2014 and 2015, winning a record 29 games in the latter.

=== Baseball ===
The men's baseball team is college baseball's highest winning team for the past 31 years, with numerous conference championships and NCAA tournament appearances. The baseball team won the national championship in 1989, and was runner-up in 1982, 1991, and 1993.

=== Men's golf ===
The men's golf team has won 21 Missouri Valley Conference Championships: 1946, 1977–79, 1984, 1986, 1999–2001, 2003–2004, 2006, 2008–15, 2017.

== NCAA infractions ==
The NCAA has cited Wichita State University with 8 NCAA rules infractions. Following the 1983 infractions decision, WSU was the most penalized school in NCAA history. This is no longer the case as SMU holds that dubious distinction with 10 major infractions.

This list was taken from The Wichita Eagle and The Hour.

- Oct. 25, 1955 – Football program reprimanded for paying costs for a recruit's visit.
- Jan. 6, 1958 – Football program placed on probation for one year for excessive aid to players via external slush fund during the 1954–56 seasons.
- Oct. 21, 1963 – Basketball program reprimanded for paying transportation for a scout.
- April 30, 1968 – Football program placed on probation for two years, postseason ban for two years, and a TV ban for three years for improper recruiting, improper aid, improper out-of-season practice, and poor ethics.
- Sept. 16, 1974 – Basketball program placed on probation for one year, postseason ban for one year, and a TV ban for two years when a team official changes a transcript for a recruit. (The Missouri Valley Conference also gave the basketball program probation for two years in Dec. 1973 for the same violations.)
- Jan. 11, 1982 – Basketball program placed on probation for three years, postseason ban for two years, reduction of scholarships for two years for 44 violations (32 under Harry Miller, 12 under Gene Smithson).
- Jan. 5, 1983 – Football program placed on probation for two years, postseason ban for one year, and TV ban for two years for paying meals and transportation for recruit, and unethical conduct.
- Jan. 29, 2015 – Baseball program placed on probation for one year and vacation of victories for extra benefits to athletes, failure of administration to monitor the baseball program, and recruiting inducements. Over a two-year span, 21 players purchased non-baseball apparel using an impermissible 50-percent discount from the team's apparel manufacturer.
