= 1949 Orange Bowl =

American college football game

- 15th Orange Bowl
- Burdine Stadium in Miami, Florida, hosted the Orange Bowl.
Texas Longhorns	Georgia Bulldogs
(6–3–1)	(9–1)
SWC	SEC
41	28
Head coach: Blair Cherry	Head coach: Wally Butts
	AP 8
	1	2	3	4	Total
Texas	13	7	7	14	41
Georgia	7	7	7	7	28
- Date: January 1, 1949
- Season: 1948
- Stadium: Burdine Stadium
- Location: Miami, Florida
- Referee: Ray McCulloch (SWC; split crew: SWC, SEC)
- Attendance: 60,523

The 1949 Orange Bowl was a college football postseason bowl game between the Texas Longhorns and the Georgia Bulldogs.

== Background ==
After a loss early in the season to North Carolina, the Bulldogs won eight straight games en route to a Southeastern Conference championship (fifth overall) and their first Orange Bowl bid since 1942. The Longhorns finished 2nd in the Southwest Conference to SMU (who went to play in the Cotton Bowl Classic), but were invited to play in the Orange Bowl for the first time in school history.

== Game summary ==
- Georgia: Al Bodine 71-yard interception return (Geri kick)
- Texas: Ray Borneman 4-yard run (Clay kick)
- Texas: Tom Landry 14-yard run (kick failed)
- Georgia: Joe Geri 1-yard run (Geri kick)
- Texas: Perry Samuels 21-yard run (Clay kick)
- Texas: Ben Proctor 24-yard pass from Campbell (Clay kick)
- Georgia: Geri 6-yard run (Geri kick)
- Georgia: Bob Walston 37-yard pass from Rauch (Geri kick)
- Texas: Randall Clay 2-yard run (Clay kick)
- Texas: Clay 4-yard run (Clay kick)

Tom Landry rushed for 117 yards in his final game before departing for the AAFC. Johnny Rauch threw 11-of-17 passes for 161 yards and a touchdown in a losing effort.

== Aftermath ==
The Bulldogs returned to the Orange Bowl in 1960 while the Longhorns returned in 1965.

== Statistics ==
Statistics	Texas	Georgia
First downs	19	9
Rushing yards	332	56
Passing yards	70	161
Total yards	402	217
Interceptions	2	2
Punts–average	5–40.0	5–41.0
Fumbles–lost	2–1	1–1
Penalties–yards	5–55	6–50
