= 1948 Colorado Buffaloes football team =

American college football season

1948 Colorado Buffaloes football
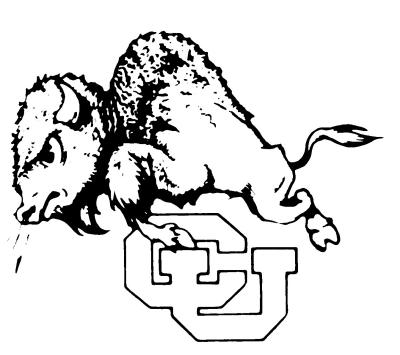
- Conference: Big Seven Conference
- Record: 3–6 (2–3 Big 7)
- Head coach: Dallas Ward (1st season)
- Captain: Bob Spicer
- Home stadium: Folsom Field

1948 Big Seven Conference football standings
	Conf.					Overall
Team	W		L		T	W		L		T
No. 5 Oklahoma $	5	–	0	–	0	10	–	1	–	0
Missouri	5	–	1	–	0	8	–	3	–	0
Kansas	4	–	2	–	0	7	–	3	–	0
Colorado	2	–	3	–	0	3	–	6	–	0
Iowa State	2	–	4	–	0	4	–	6	–	0
Nebraska	2	–	4	–	0	2	–	8	–	0
Kansas State	0	–	6	–	0	1	–	9	–	0
$ – Conference champion; Rankings from AP Poll

The 1948 Colorado Buffaloes football team was an American football team that represented the University of Colorado as a member of the Big Seven Conference during the 1948 college football season. Led by first-year head coach Dallas Ward, the Buffaloes compiled an overall record of 3–6 with a mark of 2–3 in conference play, placing fourth in the Big 7.

Colorado was ranked at No. 82 in the final Litkenhous Difference by Score System ratings for 1948.

== Schedule ==
Date	Opponent	Site	Result	Attendance	Source
September 25	New Mexico*	Folsom Field; Boulder, CO	L 6–9	16,000–16,125	
October 2	at Kansas	Memorial Stadium; Lawrence, KS	L 7–40	21,000	
October 9	Nebraska	Folsom Field; Boulder, CO (rivalry)	W 19–6	19,516	
October 16	at Iowa State	Clyde Williams Field; Ames, IA	L 7–18	14,530	
October 23	Kansas State^{†}	Folsom Field; Boulder, CO (rivalry)	W 51–7	19,518	
October 30	at Utah*	Ute Stadium; Salt Lake City, UT (rivalry)	L 12–14	17,003	
November 6	Utah State*	Folsom Field; Boulder, CO	W 28–14	10,322–15,000	
November 13	at No. 20 at Missouri	Memorial Stadium; Columbia, MO	L 13–27	22,500	
November 20	Colorado A&M	Folsom Field; Boulder, CO (rivalry)	L 25–29	13,998–18,000	
*Non-conference game; ^{†}Homecoming; Rankings from AP Poll released prior to the game
