= 1948 Saint Louis Billikens football team =

American college football season

1948 Saint Louis Billikens football
- Conference: Missouri Valley Conference
- Record: 4–7 (0–2 MVC)
- Head coach: Joe Maniaci (1st season)
- Home stadium: Edward J. Walsh Memorial Stadium

1948 Missouri Valley Conference football standings
	Conf.					Overall
Team	W		L		T	W		L		T
Oklahoma A&M $	2	–	0	–	0	6	–	4	–	0
Wichita	2	–	1	–	1	5	–	4	–	1
Drake	1	–	1	–	0	7	–	3	–	0
Tulsa	0	–	1	–	1	0	–	9	–	1
Saint Louis	0	–	2	–	0	4	–	7	–	0
$ – Conference champion

The 1948 Saint Louis Billikens football team was an American football team that represented Saint Louis University as a member of the Missouri Valley Conference (MVC) during the 1948 college football season. In its first season under head coach Joe Maniaci, the team compiled a 4–7 record (0–2 against MVC opponents), finished in last place in the conference, and was outscored by a total of 258 to 139.

Saint Louis was ranked at No. 171 in the final Litkenhous Difference by Score System ratings for 1948.

The team played its home games at Edward J. Walsh Memorial Stadium in St. Louis.

== Schedule ==
Date	Time	Opponent	Site	TV	Result	Attendance	Source
September 17	8:15 p.m.	Dubuque*	Edward J. Walsh Memorial Stadium; St. Louis, MO	KSD-TV	W 26–6	8,103	
September 24	8:15 p.m.	at Drake	Drake Stadium; Des Moines, IA		L 0–14	10,000	
October 1	8:15 p.m.	Missouri*	Edward J. Walsh Memorial Stadium; St. Louis, MO		L 7–60	14,832	
October 9		at Marquette*	Marquette Stadium; Milwaukee, MI		L 7–47	11,000	
October 15	8:15 p.m.	Rockhurst*	Edward J. Walsh Memorial Stadium; St. Louis, MO		W 31–7	7,318	
October 24	1:15 p.m.	at Dayton*	UD Stadium; Dayton, OH		L 0–41	11,000	
October 30	8:15 p.m.	St. Bonaventure*^{†}	Edward J. Walsh Memorial Stadium; St. Louis, MO		L 0–21	6,193	
November 6	2:00 p.m.	at Wichita	Veterans Field; Wichita, KS		L 14–21	9,000	
November 14	2:00 p.m.	Detroit*	Edward J. Walsh Memorial Stadium; St. Louis, MO		L 14–27	6,387	
November 20	2:00 p.m.	Missouri Mines*	Edward J. Walsh Memorial Stadium; St. Louis, MO		W 19–7	6,134	
November 25	2:00 p.m.	Kansas State*	Edward J. Walsh Memorial Stadium; St. Louis, MO		W 21–7	8,237	
*Non-conference game; ^{†}Homecoming; All times are in Central time
