= 1948 TCU Horned Frogs football team =

American college football season

1948 TCU Horned Frogs football
- Conference: Southwest Conference
- Record: 4–5–1 (1–4–1 SWC)
- Head coach: Dutch Meyer (15th season)
- Offensive scheme: Meyer spread
- Captains: Pete Stout; George Brown (co-captain)
- Home stadium: Amon G. Carter Stadium

1948 Southwest Conference football standings
	Conf.					Overall
Team	W		L		T	W		L		T
No. 10 SMU $	5	–	0	–	1	9	–	1	–	1
Texas	4	–	1	–	1	7	–	3	–	1
Baylor	3	–	2	–	1	6	–	3	–	2
Rice	3	–	2	–	1	5	–	4	–	1
Arkansas	2	–	4	–	0	5	–	5	–	0
TCU	1	–	4	–	1	4	–	5	–	1
Texas A&M	0	–	5	–	1	0	–	9	–	1
$ – Conference champion; Rankings from AP Poll

The 1948 TCU Horned Frogs football team represented Texas Christian University (TCU) as a member of the Southwest Conference (SWC) during the 1948 college football season. Led by 15th-year head coach Dutch Meyer, the Horned Frogs compiled an overall record of 4–5–1 with a mark of 1–4–1 in conference play, placing sixth in the SWC. TCU played home games at Amon G. Carter Stadium, is located on the university's campus in Fort Worth, Texas. Pete Stout, a 1947 All-Southwest Conference football team selection at fullback, was elected captain of the team. George Brown, a tackle from North Side High School in Fort Worth, was elected co-captain.

TCU was ranked at No. 40 in the final Litkenhous Difference by Score System ratings for 1948.

== Schedule ==
Date	Opponent	Site	Result	Attendance	Source
September 18	at Kansas*	Memorial Stadium; Lawrence, KS	W 14–13	26,000	
September 25	at Oklahoma A&M*	Lewis Field; Stillwater, OK	W 21–14	24,000	
October 2	Arkansas	Amon G. Carter Stadium; Fort Worth, TX	L 14–27	25,000	
October 9	at No. 17 Indiana*	Memorial Stadium; Bloomington, IN	W 7–6	28,000	
October 16	at Texas A&M	Kyle Field; College Station, TX (rivalry)	W 27–14	20,000	
October 23	No. 18 Oklahoma*	Amon G. Carter Stadium; Fort Worth, TX	L 18–21	20,000	
October 30	No. 20 Baylor	Amon G. Carter Stadium; Fort Worth, TX (rivalry)	L 3–6	25,000	
November 13	Texas	Amon G. Carter Stadium; Fort Worth, TX (rivalry)	L 7–14	32,000	
November 20	at Rice	Rice Field; Houston, TX	L 7–21	25,000	
November 27	at No. 8 SMU	Cotton Bowl; Dallas, TX (rivalry)	T 7–7	67,431	
*Non-conference game; Rankings from AP Poll released prior to the game
