= 1948 Kansas State Wildcats football team =

American college football season

1948 Kansas State Wildcats football
- Conference: Big Seven Conference
- Record: 1–9 (0–6 Big 7)
- Head coach: Ralph Graham (1st season)
- Home stadium: Memorial Stadium

1948 Big Seven Conference football standings
	Conf.					Overall
Team	W		L		T	W		L		T
No. 5 Oklahoma $	5	–	0	–	0	10	–	1	–	0
Missouri	5	–	1	–	0	8	–	3	–	0
Kansas	4	–	2	–	0	7	–	3	–	0
Colorado	2	–	3	–	0	3	–	6	–	0
Iowa State	2	–	4	–	0	4	–	6	–	0
Nebraska	2	–	4	–	0	2	–	8	–	0
Kansas State	0	–	6	–	0	1	–	9	–	0
$ – Conference champion; Rankings from AP Poll

The 1948 Kansas State Wildcats football team represented Kansas State University in the 1948 college football season. Ralph Graham served his first year as the team's head coach. The Wildcats played their home games in Memorial Stadium. The Wildcats finished the season with a 1–9 record with a 0–6 record in conference play. They finished in last place in the Big Seven Conference. The Wildcats scored 78 points and gave up 323 points.

The victory against Arkansas State ended an NCAA-record 28-game losing streak.

Kansas State was ranked at No. 181 in the final Litkenhous Difference by Score System ratings for 1948.

== Schedule ==
Date	Time	Opponent	Site	Result	Attendance	Source
September 25		at Illinois*	Memorial Stadium; Champaign, IL	L 0–40	29,593	
October 2		Iowa State	Memorial Stadium; Manhattan, KS (rivalry)	L 0–20	14,777	
October 9		Arkansas State*	Memorial Stadium; Manhattan, KS	W 37–6	12,000	
October 16		at No. 20 Oklahoma	Oklahoma Memorial Stadium; Norman, OK	L 0–42	26,000	
October 23		at Colorado	Folsom Field; Boulder, CO (rivalry)	L 7–51	19,518	
October 30		No. 8 Missouri^{†}	Memorial Stadium; Manhattan, KS	L 7–49	15,000	
November 6		at Nebraska	Memorial Stadium; Lincoln, NE (rivalry)	L 0–32	36,000	
November 13		Kansas	Memorial Stadium; Manhattan, KS (rivalry)	L 14–20	18,000	
November 20		at Oklahoma A&M*	Lewis Field; Stillwater, OK	L 6–42	12,000	
November 25	2:00 p.m.	at Saint Louis*	Edward J. Walsh Memorial Stadium; St. Louis, MO	L 7–21	8,237	
*Non-conference game; ^{†}Homecoming; Rankings from AP Poll released prior to the game; All times are in Central time
