= 1948 Arkansas Razorbacks football team =

American college football season

1948 Arkansas Razorbacks football
- Conference: Southwest Conference
- Record: 5–5 (2–4 SWC)
- Head coach: John Barnhill (3rd season)
- Captain: Clyde Scott
- Home stadium: Razorback Stadium; War Memorial Stadium

1948 Southwest Conference football standings
| | Conf. | | | | | Overall |
| Team | W | | L | | T | W | | L | | T |
|---|---|---|---|---|---|---|---|---|---|---|
| No. 10 SMU $ | 5 | – | 0 | – | 1 | 9 | – | 1 | – | 1 |
| Texas | 4 | – | 1 | – | 1 | 7 | – | 3 | – | 1 |
| Baylor | 3 | – | 2 | – | 1 | 6 | – | 3 | – | 2 |
| Rice | 3 | – | 2 | – | 1 | 5 | – | 4 | – | 1 |
| Arkansas | 2 | – | 4 | – | 0 | 5 | – | 5 | – | 0 |
| TCU | 1 | – | 4 | – | 1 | 4 | – | 5 | – | 1 |
| Texas A&M | 0 | – | 5 | – | 1 | 0 | – | 9 | – | 1 |
$ – Conference champion; Rankings from AP Poll

The 1948 Arkansas Razorbacks football team represented the University of Arkansas in the Southwest Conference (SWC) during the 1948 college football season. In their third year under head coach John Barnhill, the Razorbacks compiled a 5–5 record (2–4 against SWC opponents), finished in fifth place in the SWC, and outscored their opponents by a combined total of 227 to 136.

For the first time since 1932, the Razorbacks did not travel to Skelly Stadium, and instead played Tulsa in the new War Memorial Stadium in Little Rock. Arkansas running back Clyde Scott was named a consensus All-American and led the team with 670 rushing yards on 95 carries (7.1 yards per carry). Gordon Long lead the Razorbacks in passing, completing 32 of 56 passes for 449 yards. Ross Pritchard led the team in receiving with 17 catches for 311 yards.

Arkansas was ranked at No. 36 in the final Litkenhous Difference by Score System ratings for 1948.

== Schedule ==
| Date | Opponent | Rank | Site | Result | Attendance | Source |
|---|---|---|---|---|---|---|
| September 18 | Abilene Christian* | No. 13 | War Memorial Stadium; Little Rock, AR (dedication) | W 40–6 | 28,000 | |
| September 25 | East Texas State* | No. 13 | Razorback Stadium; Fayetteville, AR | W 46–7 | 10,000 | |
| October 2 | at TCU | No. 13 | Amon G. Carter Stadium; Fort Worth, TX | W 27–14 | 25,000 | |
| October 9 | Baylor | No. 13 | Razorback Stadium; Fayetteville, AR | L 7–23 | 16,000 | |
| October 16 | at Texas | | Memorial Stadium; Austin, TX (rivalry) | L 6–14 | 46,000 | |
| October 30 | at Texas A&M | | Kyle Field; College Station, TX (rivalry) | W 28–6 | 16,000 | |
| November 6 | Rice | | War Memorial Stadium; Little Rock, AR | L 6–25 | 34,700 | |
| November 13 | No. 7 SMU^{†} | | Razorback Stadium; Fayetteville, AR | L 12–14 | 23,000 | |
| November 20 | Tulsa* | | War Memorial Stadium; Little Rock, AR | W 55–18 | 18,000 | |
| November 27 | No. 20 William & Mary* | | War Memorial Stadium; Little Rock, AR | L 0–9 | 26,000 | |
*Non-conference game; ^{†}Homecoming; Rankings from AP Poll released prior to the game

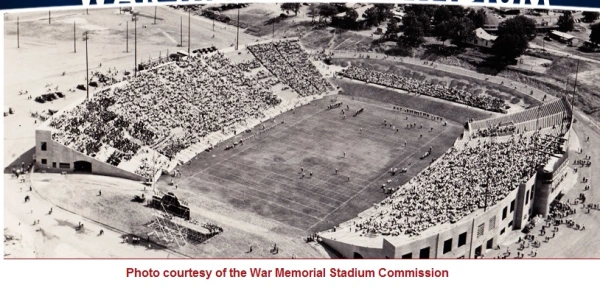
War Memorial Stadium Dedication Game

== Rankings ==
Ranking movements Legend: ██ Increase in ranking ██ Decrease in ranking — = Not ranked т = Tied with team above or below
| | Week | | | | | | | | |
| Poll | 1 | 2 | 3 | 4 | 5 | 6 | 7 | 8 | Final |
|---|---|---|---|---|---|---|---|---|---|
| AP | 13т | — | — | — | — | — | — | — | — |
