= 1948 Iowa State Cyclones football team =

American college football season

1948 Iowa State Cyclones football
- Conference: Big Seven Conference
- Record: 4–6 (2–4 Big 7)
- Head coach: Abe Stuber (2nd season)
- Captain: Ray Klootwyk
- Home stadium: Clyde Williams Field

1948 Big Seven Conference football standings
	Conf.					Overall
Team	W		L		T	W		L		T
No. 5 Oklahoma $	5	–	0	–	0	10	–	1	–	0
Missouri	5	–	1	–	0	8	–	3	–	0
Kansas	4	–	2	–	0	7	–	3	–	0
Colorado	2	–	3	–	0	3	–	6	–	0
Iowa State	2	–	4	–	0	4	–	6	–	0
Nebraska	2	–	4	–	0	2	–	8	–	0
Kansas State	0	–	6	–	0	1	–	9	–	0
$ – Conference champion; Rankings from AP Poll

The 1948 Iowa State Cyclones football team represented Iowa State College of Agricultural and Mechanic Arts (later renamed Iowa State University) in the Big Seven Conference during the 1948 college football season. In their second year under head coach Abe Stuber, the Cyclones compiled a 4–6 record (2–4 against conference opponents), tied for fifth place in the conference, and were outscored by opponents by a combined total of 197 to 116.

Iowa State was ranked at No. 79 in the final Litkenhous Difference by Score System ratings for 1948.

They played their home games at Clyde Williams Field in Ames, Iowa.

The team's statistical leaders included fullback Bill Chauncey with 428 rushing yards, quarterback Don Ferguson with 367 passing yards, left end Dean Laun with 225 receiving yards, and right halfback Bob Angle with 18 points (three touchdowns). Dean Laun was the only Iowa State player to be selected as a first-team all-conference player.

The team's regular starting lineup consisted of left end Dean Laun, left tackle Tom Southard, left guard Joe Brubaker, center Rod Rust, right guard Billy Myers, right tackle George Friedl, right end Dean Norman, quarterback Don Ferguson, left halfback Webb Halbert, right halfback Bob Angle, and fullback Bill Chauncey. Ray Klootwyk was the team captain.

== Schedule ==
Date	Time	Opponent	Site	Result	Attendance	Source
September 18	2:00 pm	Iowa State Teachers*	Clyde Williams Field; Ames, IA	W 27–7	10,867	
September 25	2:00 pm	at Nebraska	Memorial Stadium; Lincoln, NE (rivalry)	L 15–19	34,514	
October 2	2:00 pm	at Kansas State	Memorial Stadium; Manhattan, KS (rivalry)	W 20–0	14,777	
October 9	2:00 pm	Kansas	Clyde Williams Field; Ames, IA	L 7–20	11,959	
October 16	2:00 pm	Colorado^{†}	Clyde Williams Field; Ames, IA	W 18–7	14,530	
October 23	2:00 pm	at No. 9 Missouri	Memorial Stadium; Columbia, MO (rivalry)	L 7–49	22,032	
October 30	2:00 pm	No. 16 Oklahoma	Clyde Williams Field; Ames, IA	L 6–33	9,985	
November 6	2:00 pm	Drake*	Clyde Williams Field; Ames, IA	W 2–0	12,826	
November 13	2:00 pm	No. 12 Michigan State*	Clyde Williams Field; Ames, IA	L 7–48	7,847	
November 20	9:00 pm	at Arizona*	Arizona Stadium; Tucson, AZ	L 7–14	13,771	
*Non-conference game; ^{†}Homecoming; Rankings from AP Poll released prior to the game; All times are in Central time
