= Dixie Bowl =

Defunct American college football bowl game

Dixie Bowl (defunct)
- Stadium: Legion Field
- Location: Birmingham, Alabama
- Operated: 1948–1949

The Dixie Bowl was a post-season college football bowl game held New Year's Day at Legion Field in Birmingham, Alabama. The game was only held twice, following the 1947 and 1948 seasons, after which it was discontinued.

Both games featured teams from the Southern Conference and the Southwest Conference (SWC), with the SWC representative winning both.

== Game results ==
Date	Winner		Loser		Attendance	Reference
January 1, 1948	Arkansas	21	#14 William & Mary	19	20,000	
January 1, 1949	Baylor	20	#20 Wake Forest	7	21,000	

== Game summaries ==
=== 1948 Dixie Bowl ===
	1	2	3	4	Total
Razorbacks	0	14	0	7	21
#14 Indians	7	6	6	0	19

Arkansas and No. 14 William & Mary squared off in the inaugural Dixie Bowl on January 1, 1948. The game was played in front of 22,000 at Legion Field in Birmingham, Alabama. Arkansas took a 14–13 lead into halftime. The Tribe scored six in the third quarter to take a 19–14 lead. Arkansas would score the game-winning touchdown on a 7-yard run to win the game 21–19.

=== 1949 Dixie Bowl ===
	1	2	3	4	Total
Bears	6	14	0	0	20
#20 Demon Deacons	0	0	7	0	7

The second (and final) Dixie Bowl was between the Baylor Bears and the No. 20 Wake Forest Demon Deacons in front of 20,000 in Birmingham. Baylor opened the scoring in the first quarter with a 1-yard run, but missed the extra point attempt, giving them a 6–0 lead. A 1-yard run and a 12-yard pass in the second quarter made it 20–0 at halftime. Baylor's defense allowed one touchdown in the third quarter to win the game 20–7. The game was a bit lopsided despite Wake Forest winning the yardage battle 277–212.

== See also ==
- List of college bowl games
