= 1948 Tulsa Golden Hurricane football team =

American college football season

1948 Tulsa Golden Hurricane football
- Conference: Missouri Valley Conference
- Record: 0–9–1 (0–1–1 MVC)
- Head coach: Buddy Brothers (3rd season)
- Home stadium: Skelly Field

1948 Missouri Valley Conference football standings
| | Conf. | | | | | Overall |
| Team | W | | L | | T | W | | L | | T |
|---|---|---|---|---|---|---|---|---|---|---|
| Oklahoma A&M $ | 2 | – | 0 | – | 0 | 6 | – | 4 | – | 0 |
| Wichita | 2 | – | 1 | – | 1 | 5 | – | 4 | – | 1 |
| Drake | 1 | – | 1 | – | 0 | 7 | – | 3 | – | 0 |
| Tulsa | 0 | – | 1 | – | 1 | 0 | – | 9 | – | 1 |
| Saint Louis | 0 | – | 2 | – | 0 | 4 | – | 7 | – | 0 |
$ – Conference champion

The 1948 Tulsa Golden Hurricane football team represented the University of Tulsa during the 1948 college football season. In their third year under head coach Buddy Brothers, the Golden Hurricane compiled a 0–9–1 record, 0–1–1 against conference opponents, and finished in fourth place in the Missouri Valley Conference.

Tulsa was ranked at No. 150 in the final Litkenhous Difference by Score System ratings for 1948.

== Schedule ==
| Date | Opponent | Site | Result | Attendance | Source |
|---|---|---|---|---|---|
| September 25 | at Baylor* | Municipal Stadium; Waco, TX | L 19–42 | 12,000–14,000 | |
| October 2 | at Florida* | Florida Field; Gainesville, FL | L 14–28 | 15,000 | |
| October 9 | Texas Tech* | Skelly Field; Tulsa, OK | L 20–41 | 11,226–11,277 | |
| October 16 | Georgetown* | Skelly Field; Tulsa, OK | L 7–13 | 7,206 | |
| October 23 | No. 15 Nevada* | Skelly Field; Tulsa, OK | L 14–65 | 13,000 | |
| October 30 | at Wichita | Veterans Field; Wichita, KS | T 14–14 | 12,500 | |
| November 6 | Oklahoma A&M | Skelly Field; Tulsa, OK (rivalry) | L 0–19 | 14,660 | |
| November 13 | South Carolina*^{†} | Skelly Field; Tulsa, OK | L 7–27 | 9,200 | |
| November 20 | at Arkansas* | War Memorial Stadium; Little Rock, AR | L 18–55 | 18,000 | |
| November 27 | Detroit | Skelly Field; Tulsa, OK | L 22–26 | 3,406 | |
*Non-conference game; ^{†}Homecoming; Rankings from AP Poll released prior to the game

== After the season ==
=== 1949 NFL draft ===
The following Golden Hurricane players were selected in the 1949 NFL draft following the season.

| Round | Pick | Player | Position | NFL club |
|---|---|---|---|---|
| 12 | 116 | Jim Finks | Quarterback | Pittsburgh Steelers |
| 13 | 127 | Paul Barry | Gridiron | Los Angeles Rams |
| 24 | 234 | Jimmy Ford | Back | Green Bay Packers |
