= 1948 Texas Longhorns football team =

American college football season

1948 Texas Longhorns football

Orange Bowl champion

Orange Bowl, W 41–28 vs. Georgia
- Conference: Southwest Conference
- Record: 7–3–1 (4–1–1 SWC)
- Head coach: Blair Cherry (2nd season)
- Home stadium: Memorial Stadium

1948 Southwest Conference football standings
	Conf.					Overall
Team	W		L		T	W		L		T
No. 10 SMU $	5	–	0	–	1	9	–	1	–	1
Texas	4	–	1	–	1	7	–	3	–	1
Baylor	3	–	2	–	1	6	–	3	–	2
Rice	3	–	2	–	1	5	–	4	–	1
Arkansas	2	–	4	–	0	5	–	5	–	0
TCU	1	–	4	–	1	4	–	5	–	1
Texas A&M	0	–	5	–	1	0	–	9	–	1
$ – Conference champion; Rankings from AP Poll

The 1948 Texas Longhorns football team was an American football team that represented the University of Texas (now known as the University of Texas at Austin) as a member of the Southwest Conference (SWC) during the 1948 college football season. In their second year under head coach Blair Cherry, the Longhorns compiled an overall record of 7–3–1, with a mark of 4–1–1 in conference play, and finished second in the SWC. Texas concluded their season with a victory over Georgia in the Orange Bowl.

After the season, Tom Landry signed with the New York Yanks of the All-America Football Conference. Texas was ranked at No. 20 in the final Litkenhous Difference by Score System ratings for 1948.

== Schedule ==
Date	Time	Opponent	Rank	Site	Result	Attendance	Source
September 18	2:00 p.m.	LSU*		Memorial Stadium; Austin, TX	W 33–0	47,500	
September 25	2:30 p.m.	at North Carolina*		Kenan Memorial Stadium; Chapel Hill, NC	L 7–34	43,500	
October 2	2:00 p.m.	New Mexico*		Memorial Stadium; Austin, TX	W 47–0	31,000	
October 9		vs. Oklahoma*	No. 16	Cotton Bowl; Dallas, TX (rivalry)	L 14–20	67,435	
October 16	2:00 p.m.	Arkansas		Memorial Stadium; Austin, TX (rivalry)	W 14–6	46,000	
October 23	2:30 p.m.	at Rice		Rice Field; Houston, TX (rivalry)	W 20–7	30,000	
October 30	2:00 p.m.	No. 11 SMU	No. 20	Memorial Stadium; Austin, TX	L 6–21	68,750	
November 6	2:30 p.m.	at Baylor		Municipal Stadium; Waco, TX (rivalry)	W 13–10	20,000	
November 13	2:00 p.m.	at TCU		Amon G. Carter Stadium; Fort Worth, TX (rivalry)	W 14–7	32,000	
November 25	2:00 p.m.	Texas A&M		Memorial Stadium; Austin, TX (rivalry)	T 14–14	68,000	
January 1, 1949		vs. No. 8 Georgia*		Burdine Stadium; Miami, FL (Orange Bowl)	W 41–28	60,523	
*Non-conference game; Rankings from AP Poll released prior to the game; All times are in Central time

== Rankings ==
Ranking movements Legend: ██ Increase in ranking ██ Decrease in ranking — = Not ranked т = Tied with team above or below
	Week								
Poll	1	2	3	4	5	6	7	8	Final
AP	16	—	—	20т	—	—	—	—	—
