= 1948 Oklahoma A&M Cowboys football team =

American college football season

1948 Oklahoma A&M Cowboys football

MVC champion

Delta Bowl, L 0–20 vs. William & Mary
- Conference: Missouri Valley Conference
- Record: 6–4 (2–0 MVC)
- Head coach: Jim Lookabaugh (10th season)
- Home stadium: Lewis Field

1948 Missouri Valley Conference football standings
	Conf.					Overall
Team	W		L		T	W		L		T
Oklahoma A&M $	2	–	0	–	0	6	–	4	–	0
Wichita	2	–	1	–	1	5	–	4	–	1
Drake	1	–	1	–	0	7	–	3	–	0
Tulsa	0	–	1	–	1	0	–	9	–	1
Saint Louis	0	–	2	–	0	4	–	7	–	0
$ – Conference champion

The 1948 Oklahoma A&M Cowboys football team represented Oklahoma Agricultural and Mechanical College (later renamed Oklahoma State University–Stillwater) in the Missouri Valley Conference during the 1948 college football season. In their 10th year under head coach Jim Lookabaugh, the Cowboys compiled a 6–4 record (2–0 against conference opponents), won the Missouri Valley championship, lost to William & Mary in the 1949 Delta Bowl, and outscored opponents by a combined total of 219 to 127.

The team's statistical leaders included halfback Bob Meinert with 571 rushing yards, Jack Hartman with 469 passing yards and 31 points scored, and Bill Long with 234 receiving yards.

Six Oklahoma A&M players received first-team All-Missouri Valley Conference honors in 1948: tackle Charles Shaw, guards Wayne Burrow and D. Meisenheimer, end Bill Long, and backs Bill Grimes and Bob Meinert.

Oklahoma A&M was ranked at No. 50 in the final Litkenhous Difference by Score System ratings for 1948.

The team played its home games at Lewis Field in Stillwater, Oklahoma.

== Schedule ==
Date	Opponent	Site	Result	Attendance	Source
September 18	at Wichita	Veterans Field; Wichita, KS	W 27–14		
September 25	TCU*	Lewis Field; Stillwater, OK	L 14–21		
October 2	Denver*	Lewis Field; Stillwater, OK	W 27–7	14,200	
October 16	at San Francisco*	Kezar Stadium; San Francisco, CA	W 27–20	20,000	
October 23	Temple*^{†}	Lewis Field; Stillwater, OK	W 41–7		
October 30	at Kansas*	Memorial Stadium; Lawrence, KS	L 7–13	23,957	
November 6	at Tulsa	Skelly Stadium; Tulsa, OK (rivalry)	W 19–0		
November 20	Kansas State*	Lewis Field; Stillwater, OK	W 42–6		
November 27	No. 6 Oklahoma*	Lewis Field; Stillwater, OK (Bedlam Series)	L 15–19		
January 1, 1949	vs. No. 17 William & Mary*	Crump Stadium; Memphis, TN (Delta Bowl)	L 0–20	15,069	
*Non-conference game; ^{†}Homecoming; Rankings from AP Poll released prior to the game

== After the season ==
The 1949 NFL draft was held on December 21, 1948. The following Cowboys were selected.

Round	Pick	Player	Position	NFL team
2	20	Billy Grimes	Back	Chicago Bears
5	45	Bill Long	End	Pittsburgh Steelers
5	46	J. D. Cheek	Guard	New York Giants
6	52	Bob Meinert	Back	Detroit Lions
