= 1948 Oklahoma Sooners football team =

American college football season

1948 Oklahoma Sooners football

National Champion (HAF, CFRA) Big 7 champion Sugar Bowl champion

Sugar Bowl, W 14–6 vs. North Carolina
- Conference: Big Seven Conference

Ranking
- AP: No. 5
- Record: 10–1 (5–0 Big 7)
- Head coach: Bud Wilkinson (2nd season)
- Captains: Homer Paine; Wade Walker
- Home stadium: Memorial Stadium

1948 Big Seven Conference football standings
	Conf.					Overall
Team	W		L		T	W		L		T
No. 5 Oklahoma $	5	–	0	–	0	10	–	1	–	0
Missouri	5	–	1	–	0	8	–	3	–	0
Kansas	4	–	2	–	0	7	–	3	–	0
Colorado	2	–	3	–	0	3	–	6	–	0
Iowa State	2	–	4	–	0	4	–	6	–	0
Nebraska	2	–	4	–	0	2	–	8	–	0
Kansas State	0	–	6	–	0	1	–	9	–	0
$ – Conference champion; Rankings from AP Poll

The 1948 Oklahoma Sooners football team represented the University of Oklahoma in the 1948 college football season. In their second year under head coach Bud Wilkinson, the Sooners compiled a 10–1 record (5–0 against conference opponents), won the Big Seven Conference championship, and outscored their opponents by a combined total of 350 to 121.

Two Sooners received All-America honors in 1948, Buddy Burris, and Jack Mitchell. Six Sooners received all-conference honors: Burris (guard), Mitchell (back), Owens (end), Paine (tackle), Thomas (back), and Walker (tackle).

== Schedule ==
Date	Opponent	Rank	Site	Result	Attendance	Source
September 25	at Santa Clara*		Kezar Stadium; San Francisco, CA	L 17–20	5,000	
October 2	Texas A&M*		Memorial Stadium; Norman, OK	W 42–14	27,000	
October 9	vs. Texas*		Cotton Bowl; Dallas, TX (rivalry)	W 20–14	67,435	
October 16	Kansas State	No. 20	Memorial Stadium; Norman, OK	W 42–0	26,000	
October 23	at TCU*	No. 18	Amon G. Carter Stadium; Fort Worth, TX	W 21–18	20,000	
October 30	at Iowa State	No. 16	Clyde Williams Stadium; Ames, IA	W 33–6	9,985	
November 6	No. 9 Missouri	No. 15	Memorial Stadium; Norman, OK (rivalry)	W 41–7	39,297	
November 13	Nebraska	No. 9	Memorial Stadium; Norman, OK (rivalry)	W 41–14	28,000	
November 20	at Kansas	No. 8	Memorial Stadium; Lawrence, KS	W 60–7	39,000	
November 27	at Oklahoma A&M*	No. 6	Lewis Field; Stillwater, OK (Bedlam)	W 19–15	30,000	
January 1, 1949	vs. No. 3 North Carolina*	No. 5	Tulane Stadium; New Orleans, LA (Sugar Bowl)	W 14–6	80,383	
*Non-conference game; Rankings from AP Poll released prior to the game

== Rankings ==
Ranking movements Legend: ██ Increase in ranking ██ Decrease in ranking — = Not ranked ( ) = First-place votes
	Week								
Poll	1	2	3	4	5	6	7	8	Final
AP	—	20	18	16 (1)	15 (2)	9 (5)	8 (5)	6 (13)	5 (30)

== Roster ==
- Claude Arnold
- Jack Mitchell
- QB Darrell Royal, Jr.

== NFL draft ==
Two Sooners were selected in the 1949 NFL draft, held in December 1948.

Round	Pick	Player	Position	NFL team
7	62	Myrl Greathouse	Back	Chicago Cardinals
23	225	Jim Owens	End	Pittsburgh Steelers

- Owens played another season for Oklahoma in 1949.
