= 1948 Wichita Shockers football team =

American college football season

1948 Wichita Shockers football

Camellia Bowl, L 12–49 vs. Hardin–Simmons
- Conference: Missouri Valley Conference
- Record: 5–4–1 (2–1–1 MVC)
- Head coach: Jim Trimble (1st season)
- Home stadium: Veterans Field

1948 Missouri Valley Conference football standings
	Conf.					Overall
Team	W		L		T	W		L		T
Oklahoma A&M $	2	–	0	–	0	6	–	4	–	0
Wichita	2	–	1	–	1	5	–	4	–	1
Drake	1	–	1	–	0	7	–	3	–	0
Tulsa	0	–	1	–	1	0	–	9	–	1
Saint Louis	0	–	2	–	0	4	–	7	–	0
$ – Conference champion

The 1948 Wichita Shockers football team, sometimes known as the Wheatshockers, was an American football team that represented Wichita University (now known as Wichita State University) as a member of the Missouri Valley Conference during the 1948 college football season. In its first season under head coach Jim Trimble, the team compiled a 5–4–1 record (2–1–1 against conference opponents), finished second out of five teams in the MVC, lost to Hardin–Simmons in the Camellia Bowl, and was outscored by a total of 234 to 196.

Wichita was ranked at No. 101 in the final Litkenhous Difference by Score System ratings for 1948. The team played its home games at Veterans Field, now known as Cessna Stadium.

== Schedule ==
Date	Time	Opponent	Site	Result	Attendance	Source
September 18		Oklahoma A&M	Veterans Field; Wichita, KS	L 14–27		
October 2		at Bradley*	Peoria, IL	W 27–7		
October 8		at Drake	Drake Stadium; Des Moines, IA	W 21–20		
October 16		Utah State*	Veterans Field; Wichita, KS	W 20–7	9,000	
October 30		Tulsa	Veterans Field; Wichita, KS	T 14–14	12,500	
November 6	2:00 p.m.	Saint Louis^{†}	Veterans Field; Wichita, KS	W 21–14	9,000	
November 13		at Miami (OH)*	Miami Field; Oxford, OH	L 16–41	9,000	
November 20		Southwestern (KS)*	Veterans Field; Wichita, KS	W 39–13		
November 25		Nevada*	Veterans Field; Wichita, KS	L 12–42		
December 30		vs. Hardin–Simmons*	McNaspy Stadium; Lafayette, LA (Camellia Bowl)	L 12–49	< 5,000	
*Non-conference game; ^{†}Homecoming; All times are in Central time
