= 1948 Texas A&M Aggies football team =

American college football season

1948 Texas A&M Aggies football
- Conference: Southwest Conference
- Record: 0–9–1 (0–5–1 SWC)
- Head coach: Harry Stiteler (1st season)
- Home stadium: Kyle Field

1948 Southwest Conference football standings
	Conf.					Overall
Team	W		L		T	W		L		T
No. 10 SMU $	5	–	0	–	1	9	–	1	–	1
Texas	4	–	1	–	1	7	–	3	–	1
Baylor	3	–	2	–	1	6	–	3	–	2
Rice	3	–	2	–	1	5	–	4	–	1
Arkansas	2	–	4	–	0	5	–	5	–	0
TCU	1	–	4	–	1	4	–	5	–	1
Texas A&M	0	–	5	–	1	0	–	9	–	1
$ – Conference champion; Rankings from AP Poll

The 1948 Texas A&M Aggies football team represented the Agricultural and Mechanical College of Texas—now known as Texas A&M University—in the Southwest Conference (SWC) during the 1948 college football season. In its first season under head coach Harry Stiteler, the team compiled an overall record of 0–9–1, with a mark of 0–5–1 in conference play, and finished seventh in the SWC.

Texas A&M was ranked at No. 70 in the final Litkenhous Difference by Score System ratings for 1948.

== Schedule ==
Date	Opponent	Site	Result	Attendance	Source
September 18	at Villanova*	Franklin Field; Philadelphia, PA	L 14–34	35,000	
September 25	vs. Texas Tech*	Alamo Stadium; San Antonio, TX (rivalry)	L 14–20	20,860	
October 2	at Oklahoma*	Oklahoma Memorial Stadium; Norman, OK	L 14–42	27,000	
October 9	at LSU*	Tiger Stadium; Baton Rouge, LA (rivalry)	L 13–14	35,000	
October 16	TCU	Kyle Field; College Station, TX (rivalry)	L 14–27	20,000	
October 23	at Baylor	Municipal Stadium; Waco, TX (rivalry)	L 14–20	20,000	
October 30	Arkansas	Kyle Field; College Station, TX (rivalry)	L 6–28	16,000	
November 6	at No. 8 SMU	Cotton Bowl; Dallas, TX	L 14–20	53,000	
November 13	Rice	Kyle Field; College Station, TX	L 6–28	25,000	
November 25	at Texas	Memorial Stadium; Austin, TX (rivalry)	T 14–14	68,000	
*Non-conference game; Rankings from AP Poll released prior to the game
