= 1948 Missouri Tigers football team =

American college football season

1948 Missouri Tigers football

Gator Bowl, L 23–24 vs. Clemson
- Conference: Big Seven Conference
- Record: 8–3 (5–1 Big 7)
- Head coach: Don Faurot (11th season)
- Home stadium: Memorial Stadium

1948 Big Seven Conference football standings
	Conf.					Overall
Team	W		L		T	W		L		T
No. 5 Oklahoma $	5	–	0	–	0	10	–	1	–	0
Missouri	5	–	1	–	0	8	–	3	–	0
Kansas	4	–	2	–	0	7	–	3	–	0
Colorado	2	–	3	–	0	3	–	6	–	0
Iowa State	2	–	4	–	0	4	–	6	–	0
Nebraska	2	–	4	–	0	2	–	8	–	0
Kansas State	0	–	6	–	0	1	–	9	–	0
$ – Conference champion; Rankings from AP Poll

The 1948 Missouri Tigers football team was an American football team that represented the University of Missouri in the Big Seven Conference (Big 7) during the 1948 college football season. The team compiled an 8–3 record (5–1 against Big 7 opponents), finished in second place in the Big 7, lost to Clemson in the 1949 Gator Bowl, and outscored all opponents by a combined total of 331 to 161. Don Faurot was the head coach for the 11th of 19 seasons.

The team's statistical leaders included Dick Braznell with 484 rushing yards, Bus Entsminger with 633 passing yards, 1,084 yards of total offense, and 54 points scored, and Mel Sheehan with 346 receiving yards.

Though unranked in the final AP Poll, Missouri was ranked at No. 17 in the final Litkenhous Difference by Score System ratings for 1948.

The team played its home games at Memorial Stadium in Columbia, Missouri.

== Schedule ==
Date	Time	Opponent	Rank	Site	Result	Attendance	Source
September 25		at Ohio State*		Ohio Stadium; Columbus, OH	L 7–21	57,042	
October 1	8:15 p.m.	at Saint Louis*		Edward J. Walsh Memorial Stadium; St. Louis, MO	W 60–7	14,832	
October 9		No. 4 SMU		Memorial Stadium; Columbia, MO	W 20–14	30,892	
October 16		at Navy	No. 12	Municipal Stadium; Baltimore, MD	W 35–14		
October 23		Iowa State	No. 9	Memorial Stadium; Columbia, MO (rivalry)	W 49–7	22,032	
October 30		at Kansas State	No. 8	Memorial Stadium; Manhattan, KS	W 49–7	15,000	
November 6		at No. 15 Oklahoma	No. 9	Memorial Stadium; Norman, OK (rivalry)	L 7–41		
November 13		Colorado	No. 20	Memorial Stadium; Columbia, MO	W 27–13	22,500	
November 20		at Nebraska		Memorial Stadium; Lincoln, NE (rivalry)	W 33–6	21,000	
November 25		Kansas		Memorial Stadium; Columbia, MO (rivalry)	W 21–7	32,000	
January 1, 1949		vs. No. 11 Clemson*		Gator Bowl Stadium; Jacksonville, FL (Gator Bowl)	L 23–24	35,273	
*Non-conference game; Rankings from AP Poll released prior to the game; All times are in Central time

== Rankings ==
Ranking movements Legend: ██ Increase in ranking ██ Decrease in ranking — = Not ranked ( ) = First-place votes
	Week								
Poll	1	2	3	4	5	6	7	8	Final
AP	—	12 (1)	9 (2)	8 (1)	9 (4)	20	—	—	—
