= 1948 SMU Mustangs football team =

American college football season

1948 SMU Mustangs football

SWC champion

Cotton Bowl Classic, W 21–13 vs. Oregon
- Conference: Southwest Conference

Ranking
- AP: No. 10
- Record: 9–1–1 (5–0–1 SWC)
- Head coach: Matty Bell (11th season)
- Captains: Joe Ethridge; Floyd Lewis
- Home stadium: Ownby Stadium, Cotton Bowl

1948 Southwest Conference football standings
	Conf.					Overall
Team	W		L		T	W		L		T
No. 10 SMU $	5	–	0	–	1	9	–	1	–	1
Texas	4	–	1	–	1	7	–	3	–	1
Baylor	3	–	2	–	1	6	–	3	–	2
Rice	3	–	2	–	1	5	–	4	–	1
Arkansas	2	–	4	–	0	5	–	5	–	0
TCU	1	–	4	–	1	4	–	5	–	1
Texas A&M	0	–	5	–	1	0	–	9	–	1
$ – Conference champion; Rankings from AP Poll

The 1948 SMU Mustangs football team represented the Southern Methodist University (SMU) as a member of the during Southwest Conference during the 1948 college football season. Led by 11th-year head coach Matty Bell, the Mustangs compiled an overall record of 9–1–1 with a mark of 5–0–1 in conference play, winning the SWC title. SMU was invited to the Cotton Bowl Classic, where they defeated Oregon. Junior Doak Walker was awarded the Heisman Trophy. Walker established several other SWC records that still stand.

== Schedule ==
Date	Opponent	Rank	Site	Result	Attendance	Source
September 25	at Pittsburgh*		Pitt Stadium; Pittsburgh, PA	W 33–14	31,469	
October 2	Texas Tech*		Ownby Stadium; University Park, TX	W 41–6	23,000	
October 9	at Missouri*	No. 4	Memorial Stadium; Columbia, MO	L 14–20	30,892	
October 16	at Rice	No. 14	Rice Field; Houston, TX (rivalry)	W 33–7	32,600	
October 23	Santa Clara*	No. 11	Cotton Bowl; Dallas, TX	W 33–0	50,000	
October 30	at No. 20 Texas	No. 11	Memorial Stadium; Austin, TX	W 21–6	68,750	
November 6	Texas A&M	No. 8	Cotton Bowl; Dallas, TX	W 20–14	53,000	
November 13	at Arkansas	No. 7	Razorback Stadium; Fayetteville, AR	W 14–12	23,000	
November 20	Baylor	No. 10	Cotton Bowl; Dallas, TX	W 13–6	58,000	
November 27	TCU	No. 8	Cotton Bowl; Dallas, TX (rivalry)	T 7–7	67,431	
January 1	vs. No. 9 Oregon*	No. 10	Cotton Bowl; Dallas, TX (Cotton Bowl Classic)	W 21–13	69,000	
*Non-conference game; Rankings from AP Poll released prior to the game

== Rankings ==
Ranking movements Legend: ██ Increase in ranking ██ Decrease in ranking ( ) = First-place votes
	Week								
Poll	1	2	3	4	5	6	7	8	Final
AP	4 (13)	14	11	11	8 (1)	7	10	8	10

== Awards and honors ==
- Doak Walker, Heisman Trophy, All-America selection

== Team players drafted into the NFL ==
Player	Position	Round	Pick	NFL club
Doak Walker	Halfback	1	3	New York Bulldogs
Paul Page	Halfback	1	4	New York Giants
Dick McKissack	Back	2	21	Chicago Cardinals
Joe Ethridge	Tight end	6	54	Green Bay Packers
Dave Moon	Back	14	136	Pittsburgh Steelers
Floyd Lewis	Guard	18	174	Green Bay Packers
Bob Folsom	End	19	183	Green Bay Packers
