= 1948 Baylor Bears football team =

American college football season

1948 Baylor Bears football

Dixie Bowl champion

Dixie Bowl, W 20–7 vs. Wake Forest
- Conference: Southwest Conference
- Record: 6–3–2 (3–2–1 SWC)
- Head coach: Bob Woodruff (2nd season)
- Captains: Robert "Buddy" Tinsley; Bentley M. Jones
- Home stadium: Municipal Stadium

1948 Southwest Conference football standings
	Conf.					Overall
Team	W		L		T	W		L		T
No. 10 SMU $	5	–	0	–	1	9	–	1	–	1
Texas	4	–	1	–	1	7	–	3	–	1
Baylor	3	–	2	–	1	6	–	3	–	2
Rice	3	–	2	–	1	5	–	4	–	1
Arkansas	2	–	4	–	0	5	–	5	–	0
TCU	1	–	4	–	1	4	–	5	–	1
Texas A&M	0	–	5	–	1	0	–	9	–	1
$ – Conference champion; Rankings from AP Poll

The 1948 Baylor Bears football team represented Baylor University in the Southwest Conference (SWC) during the 1948 college football season. In their second season under head coach Bob Woodruff, the Bears compiled a 6–3–2 record (3–2–1 against conference opponents), tied for third place in the conference, and outscored opponents by a combined total of 167 to 125.

Baylor was ranked at No. 33 in the final Litkenhous Difference by Score System ratings for 1948.

They played their home games at Municipal Stadium in Waco, Texas. Robert "Buddy" Tinsley and Bentley M. Jones were the team captains.

== Schedule ==
Date	Opponent	Rank	Site	Result	Attendance	Source
September 25	Tulsa*		Municipal Stadium; Waco, TX	W 42–19	12,000–14,000	
October 2	at Mississippi State*		Crump Stadium; Memphis, TN	T 7–7	23,802	
October 9	at No. 13 Arkansas		Razorback Stadium; Fayetteville, AR	W 23–7	16,000	
October 16	Texas Tech*	No. 19	Municipal Stadium; Waco, TX (rivalry)	W 13–0	9,000	
October 23	Texas A&M^{†}		Municipal Stadium; Waco, TX (rivalry)	W 20–14	20,000	
October 30	at TCU	No. 20	Amon G. Carter Stadium; Fort Worth, TX (rivalry)	W 6–3	25,000	
November 6	Texas		Municipal Stadium; Waco, TX (rivalry)	L 10–13	20,000	
November 13	at Tulane*		Tulane Stadium; New Orleans, LA	L 13–35	45,000	
November 20	at No. 10 SMU		Cotton Bowl; Dallas, TX	L 6–13	58,000	
November 27	Rice		Municipal Stadium; Waco, TX	T 7–7	22,000	
January 1, 1949	vs. No. 20 Wake Forest*		Legion Field; Birmingham, AL (Dixie Bowl)	W 20–7	20,000	
*Non-conference game; ^{†}Homecoming; Rankings from AP Poll released prior to the game

== Rankings ==
Ranking movements Legend: ██ Increase in ranking ██ Decrease in ranking — = Not ranked т = Tied with team above or below
	Week								
Poll	1	2	3	4	5	6	7	8	Final
AP	—	19	—	20т	—	—	—	—	—
