= John Ford (quarterback) =

American football quarterback

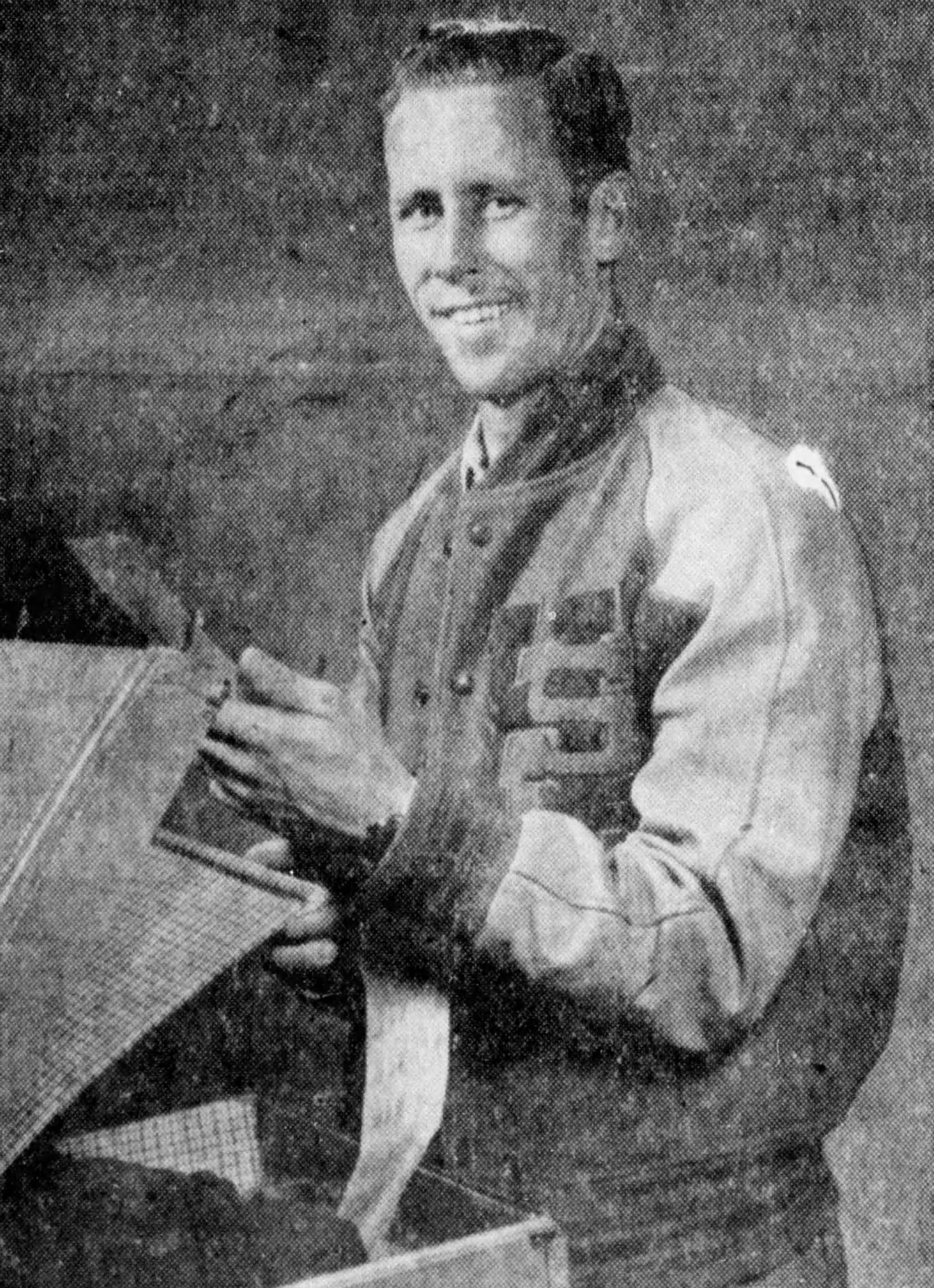
- John Ford, 1950

Profile
- Position: Quarterback

Personal information
- Born: Breckenridge, Texas, U.S.

Career information
- College: Hardin–Simmons (1948–1950)

John "Model T" Ford is an American former college football player and coach. He played quarterback for the Hardin–Simmons Cowboys from 1948 to 1950. He led the Cowboys to victories in two bowl games and set a national single-season record with 26 touchdown passes in 1949. He later worked for over 30 years as a coach, including stints as the backfield coach for the Arizona Wildcats.

== Football playing career ==
Ford played quarterback for the Hardin–Simmons Cowboys from 1948 to 1950. As a sophomore, Ford led the 1948 Hardin–Simmons Cowboys football team to a 6–2–3 record, including victories in both the Shrine Bowl and the Camellia Bowl. As a junior in 1949, he twice threw five touchdown passes in a game (against Trinity (TX) and Loyola (CA)) and set a new national record with 26 touchdown passes in 11 games. As a senior in 1950, Ford ranked second in the nation in passing yards (1,777 yards) and fifth in total offense (1,720 yards). He was selected three times as the All-Border Conference quarterback. During his four years at Hardin-Simmons, Ford completed 313 of 552 pases for 4,186 yards and accounted for 366 points on 58 touchdown passes and three rushing touchdowns.

Ford signed a contract with the Philadelphia Eagles in March 1951, but he was considered too small and was released.

== Football coaching career ==
Ford instead accepted a coaching position at Rotan High School in Rotan, Texas, in the fall of 1951. In July 1953, he was named backfield coach at the University of Arizona. He continued in coaching for over 30 years, including a position with Rio Hondo Junior College in Whittier, California.

== Later years and family ==
Ford was inducted into the Hardin-Simmons Hall of Fame in 1984.

Ford's brother, Ken "Model A" Ford, also played quarterback at Hardin–Simmons.
