= Camellia Bowl (1948) =

1948 college football game in Louisiana, US

- Bowl game
Wichita Shockers	Hardin–Simmons Cowboys
(5–3–1)	(4–4–2)
Missouri Valley Conference	Border Conference
Head coach: Jim Trimble	Head coach: Warren Woodson
- Date: December 30, 1948
- Season: 1948
- Stadium: McNaspy Stadium
- Location: Lafayette, Louisiana
- Referee: Kermit Laabs
- Attendance: 5,000

The Camellia Bowl was a post-season major college football bowl game played at McNaspy Stadium in Lafayette, Louisiana, on December 30, 1948, between the Hardin–Simmons Cowboys and the Wichita Shockers (now known as Wichita State).

== Background ==
The Border Conference's Cowboys, led by quarterback Johnny Ford and wide receiver Bob McChesney, were playing in their third bowl game of 1948 (a tie to Pacific 35–35 in the Grape Bowl on December 11, and a defeat of Ouachita College 40–12 in the Shrine Bowl a week later). Wichita was in second place in the Missouri Valley Conference, playing in their first bowl game.

== Game summary ==
The Hardin-Simmons Cowboys outrushed and simply overmanned the Shockers, beating them soundly, 49–12. McChesney scored four touchdowns on passes from Ford. The bowl was never played again due to the low attendance.

== See also ==
- List of college bowl games
