= Ken Ford (American football) =

American football player (1935–2019)

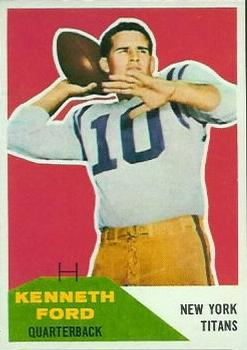
- 1960 Fleer trading card

Profile
- Position: Quarterback

Personal information
- Born: December 31, 1935; Mineral Wells, Texas, U.S.
- Died: March 9, 2019 (aged 83)
- Listed height: 6 ft 3 in (1.91 m)
- Listed weight: 185 lb (84 kg)

Career information
- High school: Breckenridge (Breckenridge, Texas)
- College: Hardin–Simmons (1954–1957)
- NFL draft: 1958: 13th round, 150th overall pick

Career history
- Toronto Argonauts (1958); New York Giants (1958)*; New York Titans (1960)*
- * Offseason or practice squad member only

Awards and highlights
- NCAA passing touchdowns co-leader (1957); First-team All-Border Conference (1957)

Kenneth Carrol "Model A" Ford (December 31, 1935 – March 9, 2019) was an American football quarterback. He played college football at Hardin–Simmons University, where he led the nation in several passing categories his senior year in 1957. He was selected by the Washington Redskins in the 13th round of the 1958 NFL draft. He spent time in the NFL, Canadian Football League (CFL), and American Football League (AFL) but did not play in any regular season games.

== Early life ==
Kenneth Carrol Ford was born in Mineral Wells, Texas, on December 31, 1935. He played high school football at Breckenridge High School in Breckenridge, Texas as a quarterback. He helped Breckenridge win the state title in 1951 and 1952.

== College career ==
Ford played college football for the Hardin–Simmons Cowboys of Hardin–Simmons University. He was a four-year varsity starter from 1954 to 1957. He finished fifth in the country in passing yards as a freshman in 1954, completing 78 of 146 passes (53.4%) for 948 yards, seven touchdowns, and nine interceptions. Ford ranked sixth in the nation in completions with 73 as a sophomore in 1955, earning honorable mention All-Border Conference honors. He split time with quarterback Gene Saur in 1956, completing 50 of 105 passes (47.6%) for 490 yards, no touchdowns, and 13 interceptions.

As a senior in 1957, Ford completed 115 of 205 passes (56.1%) for 1,254 yards, 14 touchdowns, and 11 interceptions while also rushing for four touchdowns, garnering first-team All-Border Conference recognition. He led the country in completions, attempts, and total touchdowns (18) while tying for the NCAA lead in touchdown passes. His completion percentage was also the second best in the country. He was named Hardin–Simmons University's most outstanding athlete in 1957.

Ford finished his college career with totals of 296 completions on 591 passing attempts for 3,546 yards and 29 touchdowns. (Note: Counting his completion totals by season actually adds up to 316.) Ford's 296 completions beat the mark set by his brother, John "Model T" Ford, who played at Hardin–Simmons in the late 1940s. After his college career, Ken was invited to the Blue–Gray Football Classic and North–South Shrine Game. In the 1957 Blue–Gray game, Ford completed nine of 23 passes for 185 yards and one touchdown, leading the South to a 21–20 victory while earning game MVP honors. Losing North head coach Murray Warmath said Ford "is absolutely the greatest college passer I ever saw." Ford graduated from college in 1957.

== Professional career ==
On January 10, 1958, it was reported that Ford had signed with the Toronto Argonauts of the Interprovincial Rugby Football Union. On January 28, 1958, he was selected by the Washington Redskins in the 13th round, with the 150th overall pick, of the 1958 NFL draft. He did not play in any games while with the Argonauts and was released on August 27, 1958, after the second game of the 1958 CFL season.

On September 14, 1958, it was reported Ford was headed to Tucson, Arizona, to play for the Tucson Cowboys of the Western Professional Football League. However, a few days later, the New York Giants purchased his NFL rights from the Redskins. Ford spent the 1958 NFL season on New York's taxi squad. He simulated Detroit Lions quarterback Tobin Rote in practice prior to the Week 11 game against the Lions. The Giants later advanced to the 1958 NFL Championship Game, where they lost to the Baltimore Colts in overtime by a score of 23–17. Ford did not re-sign with the Giants in 1959, instead choosing to go into business in Texas.

Ford signed with the New York Titans of the new American Football League for the 1960 season. His college head coach Sammy Baugh was the head coach for the Titans. Ford was the starting quarterback for the team's third preseason game on August 21 against the Dallas Texans. On August 23, 1960, Titans owner Harry Wismer released Ford without Baugh's consent.

== Personal life ==
Ford married Myrna Loy Petty on September 14, 1958, in Las Vegas, Nevada. He coached high school football at several schools in Texas. In 1968, he moved to Graham, Texas, where he lived for the remainder of his life. Ford graduated from Tarleton State University with a master's degree. He was then the principal at Shawnee Elementary School in Texas and Graham High School, retiring in 1993.

Ford was inducted into the Hardin–Simmons Athletic Hall of Fame in 1995 and the Big Country Athletic Hall of Fame in 2012. He died on March 9, 2019, at the age of 83. He was buried at Pioneer Cemetery in Graham.

== See also ==
- List of NCAA major college football yearly passing leaders
