= 1948 Rice Owls football team =

American college football season

1948 Rice Owls football
- Conference: Southwest Conference
- Record: 5–4–1 (3–2–1 SWC)
- Head coach: Jess Neely (9th season)
- Home stadium: Rice Field

1948 Southwest Conference football standings
	Conf.					Overall
Team	W		L		T	W		L		T
No. 10 SMU $	5	–	0	–	1	9	–	1	–	1
Texas	4	–	1	–	1	7	–	3	–	1
Baylor	3	–	2	–	1	6	–	3	–	2
Rice	3	–	2	–	1	5	–	4	–	1
Arkansas	2	–	4	–	0	5	–	5	–	0
TCU	1	–	4	–	1	4	–	5	–	1
Texas A&M	0	–	5	–	1	0	–	9	–	1
$ – Conference champion; Rankings from AP Poll

The 1948 Rice Owls football team represented Rice Institute during the 1948 college football season. The Owls were led by ninth-year head coach Jess Neely and played their home games at Rice Field in Houston, Texas. Rice competed as a member of the Southwest Conference, finishing tied for third.

Rice was ranked at No. 38 in the final Litkenhous Difference by Score System ratings for 1948.

== Schedule ==
Date	Opponent	Site	Result	Attendance	Source
September 25	Sam Houston State*	Rice Field; Houston, TX	W 46–0	22,000	
October 2	LSU*	Rice Field; Houston, TX	L 13–26	29,000	
October 9	at USC*	Los Angeles Memorial Coliseum; Los Angeles, CA	L 0–7	49,531	
October 16	No. 14 SMU	Rice Field; Houston, TX (rivalry)	L 7–33	32,600	
October 23	Texas	Rice Field; Houston, TX (rivalry)	L 7–20	30,000	
October 30	at Texas Tech*	Jones Stadium; Lubbock, TX	W 14–7	19,000	
November 6	at Arkansas	War Memorial Stadium; Little Rock, AR	W 25–6	34,700	
November 13	at Texas A&M	Kyle Field; College Station, TX	W 28–6	25,000	
November 20	TCU^{†}	Rice Field; Houston, TX	W 21–7	25,000	
November 27	at Baylor	Municipal Stadium; Waco, TX	T 7–7	22,000	
*Non-conference game; ^{†}Homecoming; Rankings from AP Poll released prior to the game
